= 2008 Italian Grand Prix =

Formula One motor race held in 2008

Coordinates: 45°36′56″N 9°16′52″E

Race 14 of 18 in the 2008 Formula One World Championship
← Previous race	Next race →

Race details
- Date: 14 September 2008
- Official name: Formula 1 Gran Premio Santander D'Italia 2008
- Location: Autodromo Nazionale di Monza, Monza, Italy
- Course: Permanent racing facility
- Course length: 5.793 km (3.6 miles)
- Distance: 53 laps, 306.720 km (190.58 miles)
- Weather: Heavy rain, dry towards the end

Pole position
Driver	(Germany) Sebastian Vettel	Toro Rosso-Ferrari
- Time: 1:37.555

Fastest lap
Driver	(Finland) Kimi Räikkönen	Ferrari
- Time: 1:28.047 on lap 53

Podium
First	(Germany) Sebastian Vettel	Toro Rosso-Ferrari
Second	(Finland) Heikki Kovalainen	McLaren-Mercedes
Third	(Poland) Robert Kubica	BMW Sauber

The 2008 Italian Grand Prix (formally the Formula 1 Gran Premio Santander D'Italia 2008) was a Formula One motor race held on 14 September 2008 at the Autodromo Nazionale di Monza, Monza, Italy. It was the 14th race of the 2008 Formula One World Championship. Future four-time World Champion Sebastian Vettel for the Toro Rosso team took a maiden victory, winning the 53-lap race from a maiden pole position. Heikki Kovalainen finished second in a McLaren, and Robert Kubica third in a BMW Sauber.

Vettel began the race, started under the safety car, ahead of Kovalainen in second. Red Bull's Mark Webber started from third. Rain early in the race allowed Vettel to establish a solid lead over Kovalainen, which he extended as the track dried. Kubica and Fernando Alonso finished in the top four after starting from 11th and eighth, respectively. McLaren driver and Drivers' Championship leader Lewis Hamilton was able to move through the field after qualifying in 15th, finishing in seventh, one place behind rival Felipe Massa, of Ferrari.

Vettel's victory made him the youngest driver to win a Formula One race, at 21 years 73 days in addition to giving Toro Rosso (which was formerly Minardi team) its maiden Formula One win despite using a 2007-spec engine, and also became the first German driver to win a race since Michael Schumacher at the 2006 Chinese Grand Prix. Vettel's record was broken by Max Verstappen aged 18 years and 228 days at the 2016 Spanish Grand Prix. Massa scored one point more than Hamilton, narrowing the McLaren driver's lead in the Championship once more with four races remaining. However, Kovalainen's second-placed finish put McLaren closer to catching Ferrari in the Constructors' Championship.

== Background ==
Heading into the 14th race of the season, McLaren driver Lewis Hamilton led the Drivers' Championship with 76 points; Ferrari driver Felipe Massa was second on 74 points, two points behind Hamilton. Behind Hamilton and Massa in the Drivers' Championship, Robert Kubica was third on 58 points in a BMW Sauber, and Massa's Ferrari teammate Kimi Räikkönen fourth on 57 points. Kubica's teammate Nick Heidfeld was fifth on 49 points. In the Constructors' Championship, Ferrari were leading on 131 points and McLaren were second on 119 points, 12 points behind. BMW Sauber were third with 107 points. In the battle for fourth-place Toyota had 41 points, ahead of Renault with 36 points.

After the previous race, Hamilton was penalised for cutting a chicane and gaining an advantage over Räikkönen in the closing laps. This meant that Hamilton was demoted from first to third position, giving victory to Massa. While McLaren had lodged an appeal against the decision, the result would not be heard until September 23. Reflecting on the controversy, Norbert Haug, Vice President of Mercedes-Benz Motorsport, said:

Our disappointment was big, when the stewards took away victory from him [Hamilton] and the team. However, we are fighters. If we would have needed a better motivation for the last five races of the season we have it now. When we went to the airport last Sunday evening, Lewis said to me - preferably we now want to win all remaining races, don't we? I have no objection.

Following the rain-soaked Belgian Grand Prix, Massa expressed his hope that the Italian Grand Prix would be held on a dry track, saying "it would be nice not to have the rain here and not have any opportunity to have a consistent race." The close nature of the Championship meant that Ferrari's home race had the potential to be a turning point in the season. Testing at the Monza circuit in early September had indicated that the performance gap between McLaren and Ferrari had narrowed. Despite this, Ferrari were hoping that their straight-line speed would be better suited to Monza's long straights. Ferrari confirmed on September 12 that Räikkönen would continue to drive for the team until at least 2010, ending media speculation that he could be about to retire.

== Practice ==
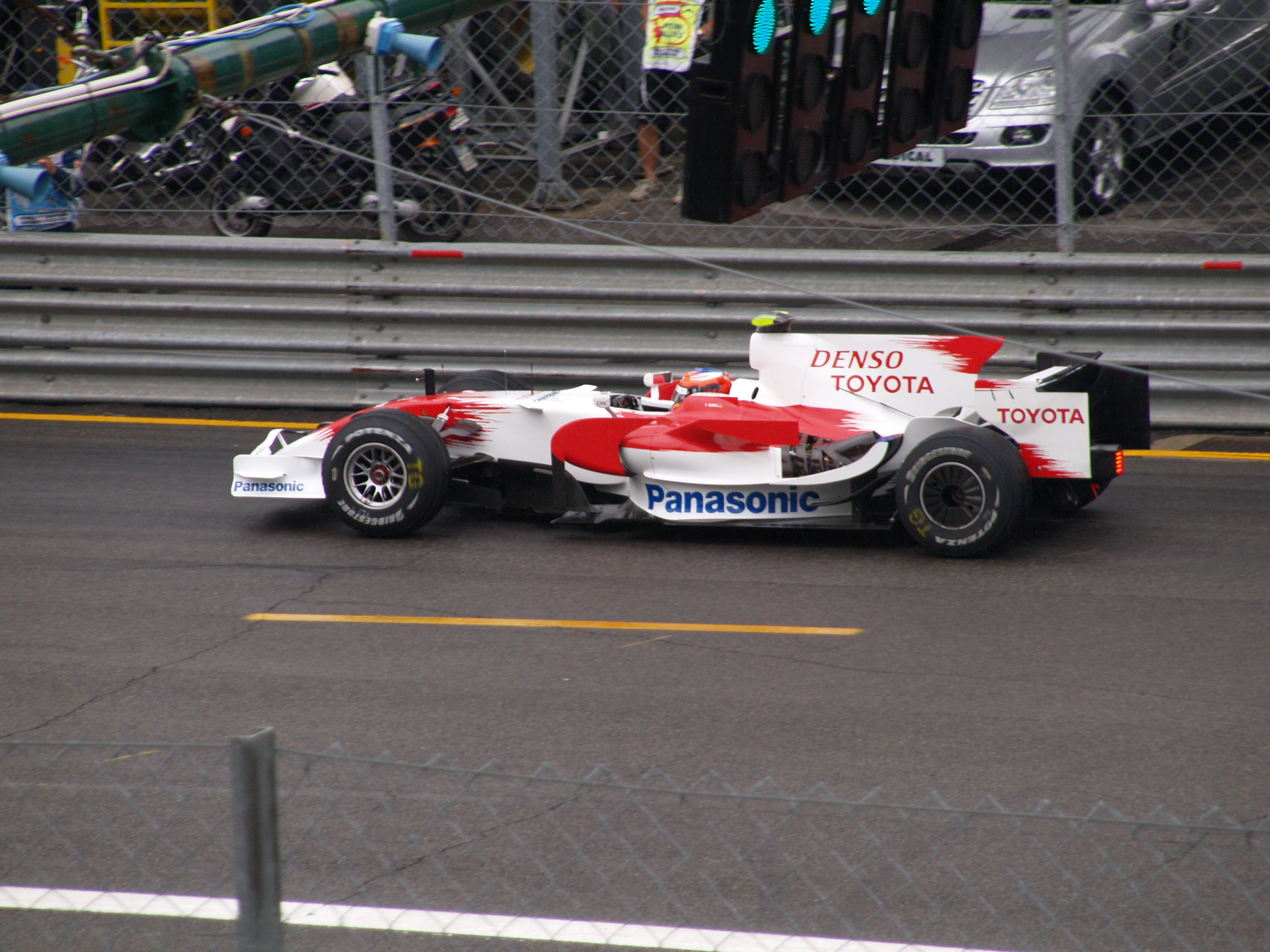
Timo Glock was fastest in the third session of practice

Three practice sessions were held before the race: the first was held on Friday morning and the second on Friday afternoon. Both sessions lasted 90 minutes. The third session was held on Saturday morning and lasted an hour. All three sessions were affected by rain, with only the second giving teams any chance to run dry-weather tyres. Adrian Sutil was quickest with a time of 1:32.842 in the first session, more than half a second quicker than the next fastest drivers Rubens Barrichello and Giancarlo Fisichella. Timo Glock was the next quickest, almost four seconds behind Sutil. Conditions were so poor that six drivers, including both McLarens, failed to set times. The session was stopped four minutes early, though by that time no cars had entered the track for at least ten minutes. The track dried out in the second session; Räikkönen adapted best to the changed conditions with a lap of 1:23.861, significantly quicker than his morning time. Kubica was the next fastest, with his BMW teammate Heidfeld in third. Hamilton, Nico Rosberg and Massa rounded out the top six. Glock was fastest in the final session with a time of 1:35.464, followed by Sebastian Vettel, Rosberg, Jarno Trulli, Kazuki Nakajima and Heidfeld. Hamilton only completed eight laps, and finished last with a time almost 11 seconds behind Glock.

== Qualifying ==
The qualifying session on Saturday afternoon was split into three parts. The first part ran for 20 minutes and eliminated the cars from qualifying that finished the session 16th or lower. The second part of qualifying lasted 15 minutes and eliminated cars that finished in positions 11 to 15. The final part of qualifying determined the positions from first to tenth, and decided pole position. Cars which competed in the final session of qualifying were not allowed to refuel before the race, and as such carried more fuel than in the previous sessions.

It was a joint decision to go out on wet-weather tyres at the start of [the second session] - partly mine and partly my engineers'. We thought it was the right way to go at the time because it was getting dryer but the grip-level was poor so I came in and switched to extremes ... It's the first time this has happened to me in Formula 1, so I can't really complain.

— Lewis Hamilton, speaking after qualifying.

Vettel became the youngest driver in the history of Formula One to take pole position, with a time of 1:37.555 in very wet conditions. He was joined on the front row of the grid by Kovalainen. Mark Webber qualified third after his final lap pushed Sébastien Bourdais into fourth position. Massa took sixth position behind Rosberg. Trulli, Fernando Alonso, Glock and Heidfeld rounded out the top ten. Kubica qualified 11th, blaming late rain in the second qualifying session for his position. Fisichella qualified 12th to give Force India its best grid position of the season. Both Räikkönen and Hamilton blamed a late entry into the second session for their poor qualifying times, which saw them eliminated in 14th and 15th positions, respectively. Hamilton originally ran on the standard wet-weather tyres, and by the time he had changed to extreme wet-weather tyres the rain had intensified. This was McLaren's only result outside the top ten in qualifying all season and the first time in Hamilton's career that he had failed to progress into the final qualifying session.

=== Qualifying classification ===
Pos	No	Driver	Constructor	Part 1	Part 2	Part 3	Grid
1	15	(Germany) Sebastian Vettel	Toro Rosso-Ferrari	1:35.464	1:35.837	1:37.555	1
2	23	(Finland) Heikki Kovalainen	McLaren-Mercedes	1:35.214	1:35.843	1:37.631	2
3	10	(Australia) Mark Webber	Red Bull-Renault	1:36.001	1:36.306	1:38.117	3
4	14	(France) Sébastien Bourdais	Toro Rosso-Ferrari	1:35.543	1:36.175	1:38.445	4
5	7	(Germany) Nico Rosberg	Williams-Toyota	1:35.485	1:35.898	1:38.767	5
6	2	(Brazil) Felipe Massa	Ferrari	1:35.536	1:36.676	1:38.894	6
7	11	(Italy) Jarno Trulli	Toyota	1:35.906	1:36.008	1:39.152	7
8	5	(Spain) Fernando Alonso	Renault	1:36.297	1:36.518	1:39.751	8
9	12	(Germany) Timo Glock	Toyota	1:35.737	1:36.525	1:39.787	9
10	3	(Germany) Nick Heidfeld	BMW Sauber	1:35.709	1:36.626	1:39.906	10
11	4	(Poland) Robert Kubica	BMW Sauber	1:35.553	1:36.697		11
12	21	(Italy) Giancarlo Fisichella	Force India-Ferrari	1:36.280	1:36.698		12
13	9	(United Kingdom) David Coulthard	Red Bull-Renault	1:36.485	1:37.284		13
14	1	(Finland) Kimi Räikkönen	Ferrari	1:35.965	1:37.522		14
15	22	(United Kingdom) Lewis Hamilton	McLaren-Mercedes	1:35.394	1:39.265		15
16	17	(Brazil) Rubens Barrichello	Honda	1:36.510			16
17	6	(Brazil) Nelson Piquet Jr.	Renault	1:36.630			17
18	8	(Japan) Kazuki Nakajima	Williams-Toyota	1:36.653			18
19	16	(United Kingdom) Jenson Button	Honda	1:37.006			19
20	20	(Germany) Adrian Sutil	Force India-Ferrari	1:37.417			20

== Race ==
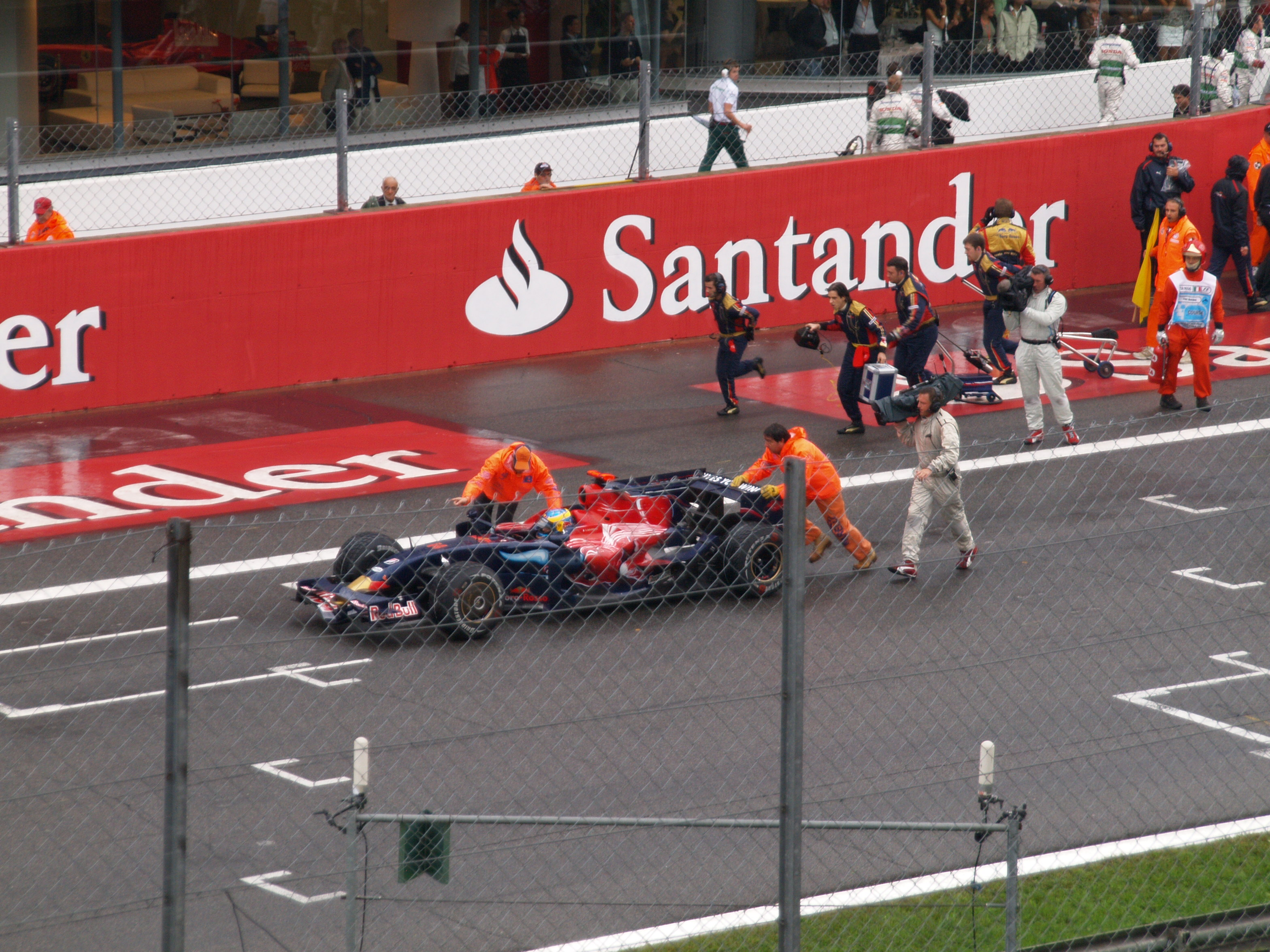
Sébastien Bourdais stalls on the grid

Heavy rain prior to the race made the track very slippery, with more rain expected throughout the day. The air temperature at the track was 14 °C (57 °F). Jenson Button and Kazuki Nakajima started the race from the pit-lane, their teams choosing to make adjustments from qualifying to the set-ups of their cars. All cars were using extreme wet-weather tyres. The race began at 14:00 local time (UTC+1) behind the safety car because of the rain, meaning that there would be a rolling start. Bourdais' car stalled on the grid, and was pushed back to the pits. By the time his team restarted the car, he was in last position and one lap down.

The safety car pulled into the pit-lane at the end of the second lap. Vettel retained his lead into the first corner, followed by Kovalainen, Webber, Rosberg and Massa. Kubica passed Heidfeld at the first chicane; Glock passed Alonso later in the lap. Vettel immediately opened a lead of two seconds over Kovalainen; the McLaren driver experienced visibility problems as a result of the spray off the back of the Toro Rosso. Alonso regained seventh from Glock when he passed him at the first chicane on lap four as the track began to dry. Räikkönen and Hamilton passed Coulthard on the same lap to take 12th and 13th positions, respectively. The next lap, Hamilton attempted to pass Räikkönen at the third corner, but overshot, cutting the chicane. Emerging ahead of the Ferrari, he gave the place back, returning the advantage and avoiding a penalty. Glock spun on lap seven, losing one place to Kubica.

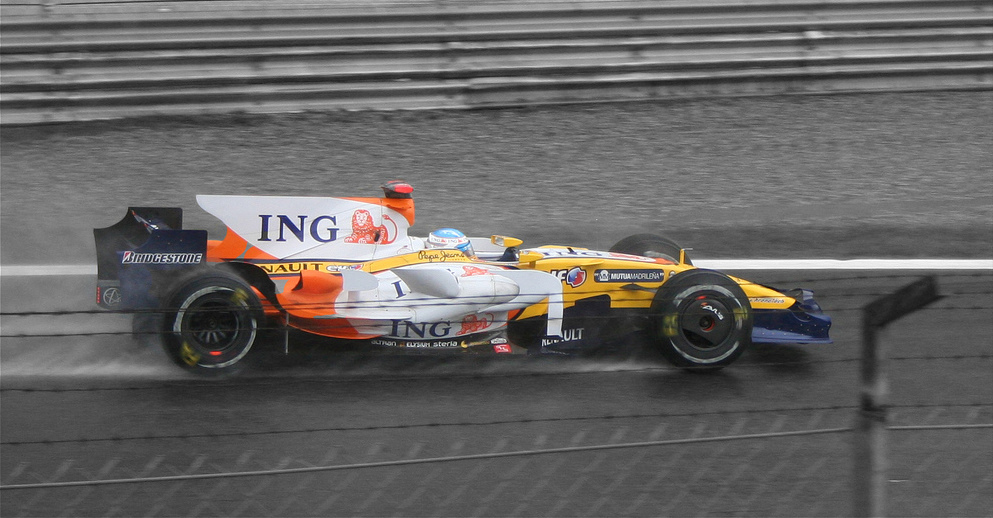
Fernando Alonso used a one-stop strategy to secure fourth position

Vettel continued to open his lead on Kovalainen; by lap eight it stood at 6.3 seconds. Both Räikkönen and Hamilton passed Fisichella in separate manoeuvres over the next two laps. Hamilton took 11th position from Räikkönen on lap 11, outbraking the Ferrari at turn four. Fisichella collided with Coulthard two laps later. As a result of the contact, the Force India's front wing broke loose and lodged under the car. Consequently, Fisichella lost control at turn nine, spinning into the gravel trap and retiring. Massa overtook Rosberg for fourth on the same lap, beginning a close fight where both drivers repeatedly exchanged positions over the next three laps. Massa eventually consolidated fourth position on lap 15. Hamilton passed Heidfeld, Glock, Kubica and Alonso in separate manoeuvres, to sit in seventh by lap 19.

Vettel pitted from first position on lap 18. Kovalainen, Webber and Massa pitted four laps later. Light rain began to fall on lap 26, though only lasted five minutes. Glock, Trulli, Räikkönen and Hamilton completed their first pit stops over the following laps. Coulthard was the first driver to try intermediate wet-weather tyres when he pitted on lap 28. He lost grip in the wet and went straight through the first chicane. Alonso, Heidfeld, Kubica and Piquet took their only pit stops for the race soon after, all changing to intermediate tyres. By lap 36 the majority of the field were running on intermediate tyres. Webber was passed at turn eight by Massa on lap 35. The Australian spun after the corner, though managed to retain seventh position. A lap later, however, Hamilton outbraked Webber at turn three and demoted the Red Bull driver to eighth.

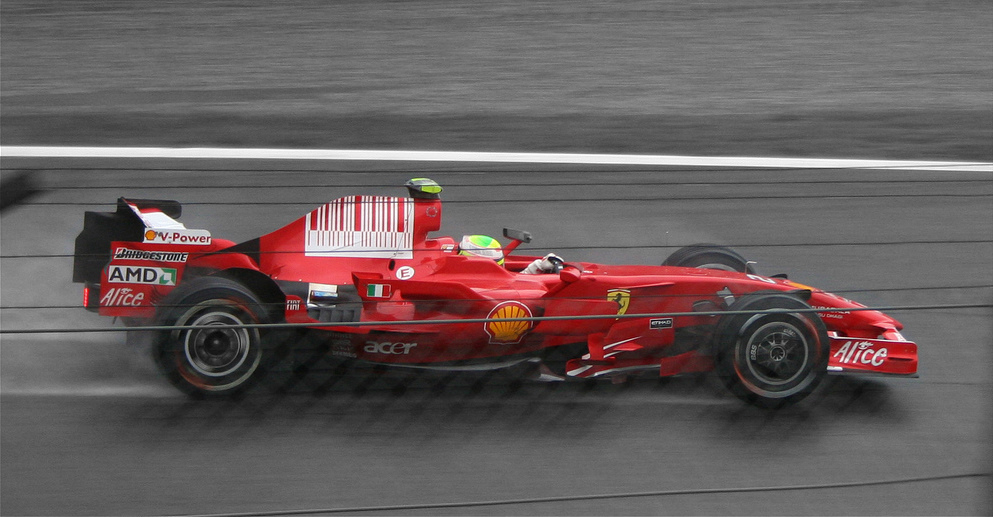
Felipe Massa narrowed his gap to Lewis Hamilton in the Drivers' Championship

Hamilton began lapping fastest, recording a 1:32.869 on lap 38, more than a second faster than first-placed Vettel. Lap 45 saw three drivers set consecutive new fastest laps; Kubica's 1:32.366 was beaten by Webber with a 1:32.014s. They were then superseded by Räikkönen, who set a 1:31.691. On lap 49 Webber attempted to pass Hamilton at the first chicane, but the two cars touched wheels. Webber was forced down the escape road, and when he emerged in front of Hamilton, he returned the position. Räikkönen continued to move through the field; he passed Coulthard and Piquet in separate manoeuvres to take ninth position. Nakajima attempted to pass Coulthard into turn nine, but succeeded only in turning into the Red Bull RB4, sending it into the gravel trap. Coulthard pitted for a new front wing, which dropped him to 17th. Vettel crossed the finish line on lap 53 by 12.5 seconds over Kovalainen, becoming the youngest driver in Formula One history to win a Grand Prix. The one-stop strategies used by Kubica and Alonso paid off as they finished in third and fourth, respectively. Heidfeld, Massa, Hamilton and Webber rounded out the top eight. Räikkönen finished in ninth position, setting the fastest laptime of 1:28.047 on the final lap.

=== Post-race ===
A fantastic race, a fantastic weekend with pole as well and a fantastic strategy this afternoon. As for the podium ceremony it was unbelievable and this is the best day of my life. I will never forget these feelings. It is so unbelievable. It is better than I had ever expected ... A perfect weekend.

— Sebastian Vettel, speaking after the race.

The top three finishers appeared on the podium and in the subsequent press conference. Vettel acknowledged the support of his team, saying the set-up of the car perfectly suited the way the race developed. Other drivers congratulated Vettel; Hamilton said that "with all that pressure it is easier to make mistakes, and he obviously didn't, so congratulations to him. He did a good job." The Grand Prix also marked the first win by Toro Rosso, the first non-Ferrari Italian-based team to win since 1957. Many of the Toro Rosso team had been there when the outfit competed as Minardi, a team that rarely scored points, let alone won a race, but were always very popular, adding an emotional aspect to the victory. Ferrari team principal Stefano Domenicali paid tribute to the team, who use Ferrari engines, saying "They deserve it, they are close to us, and we are happy to work with them because we are giving them our engine."

Kovalainen expressed his disappointment in finishing second, saying:

Clearly not possible to win today. Sebastian and Toro Rosso have been strong all weekend. I had a little bit of a problem earlier on in the race, in the first couple of stints, especially with the extreme wet tyre and some problems also to warm up my brakes, so I was just struggling to find more time and trying to go faster. We kept pushing and towards the end it got a little bit better but I think it was the maximum we could do today. We picked up some good points and we can look forward to the next grand prix.

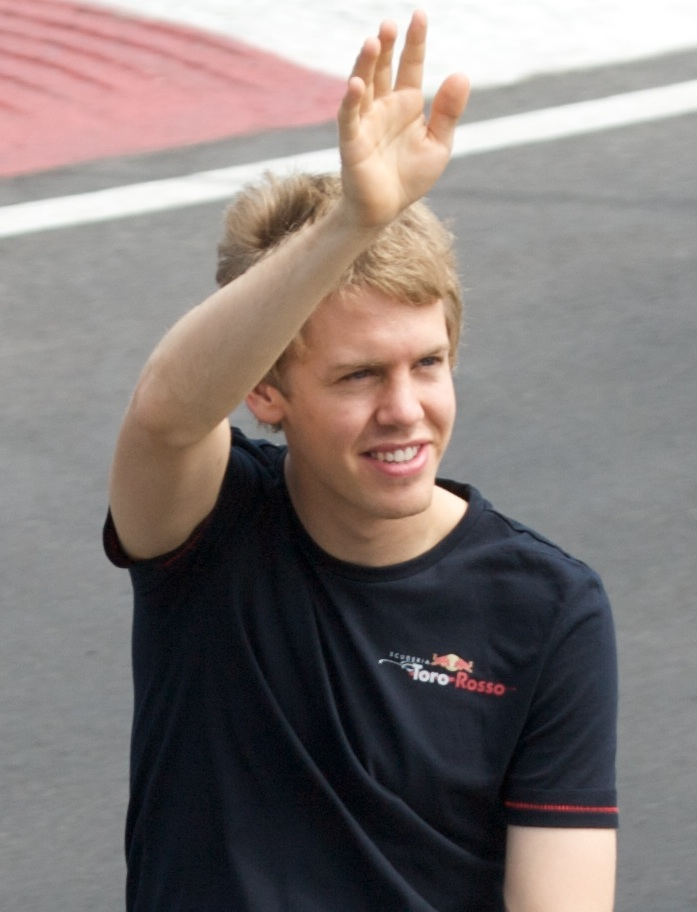
Sebastian Vettel pictured in that years' Canadian Grand Prix

Hamilton was satisfied with his performance in the race, saying "today was all about damage control: I came away with some points and kept my lead in the world Drivers' Championship." Massa said that he had hoped to do better, but added "I've managed to make up a point on my nearest rival so this is absolutely not a negative result." Massa took three points from the race, compared to Hamilton's two, and narrowed the gap in the Drivers' Championship to one point with four races remaining. Kovalainen's second-placed finish closed the gap in the Constructors' Championship between Ferrari and McLaren from twelve to five points.

Third-placed Kubica said that his strategy allowed him to capitalise on the changing track conditions, as his only stop seemed the best time to change to intermediate tyres. The Polish driver said that racing in Italy was particularly special for him, having lived in the country for five years: "That is why we divided the helmet into two pieces. One was Italian colours, one was Polish colours." Alonso, who used a similar strategy, said "the result today is very good because Monza was supposed to be the race that we were looking forward to the least." Toyota's failure to score at the race meant that they were tied with Renault on 41 points.

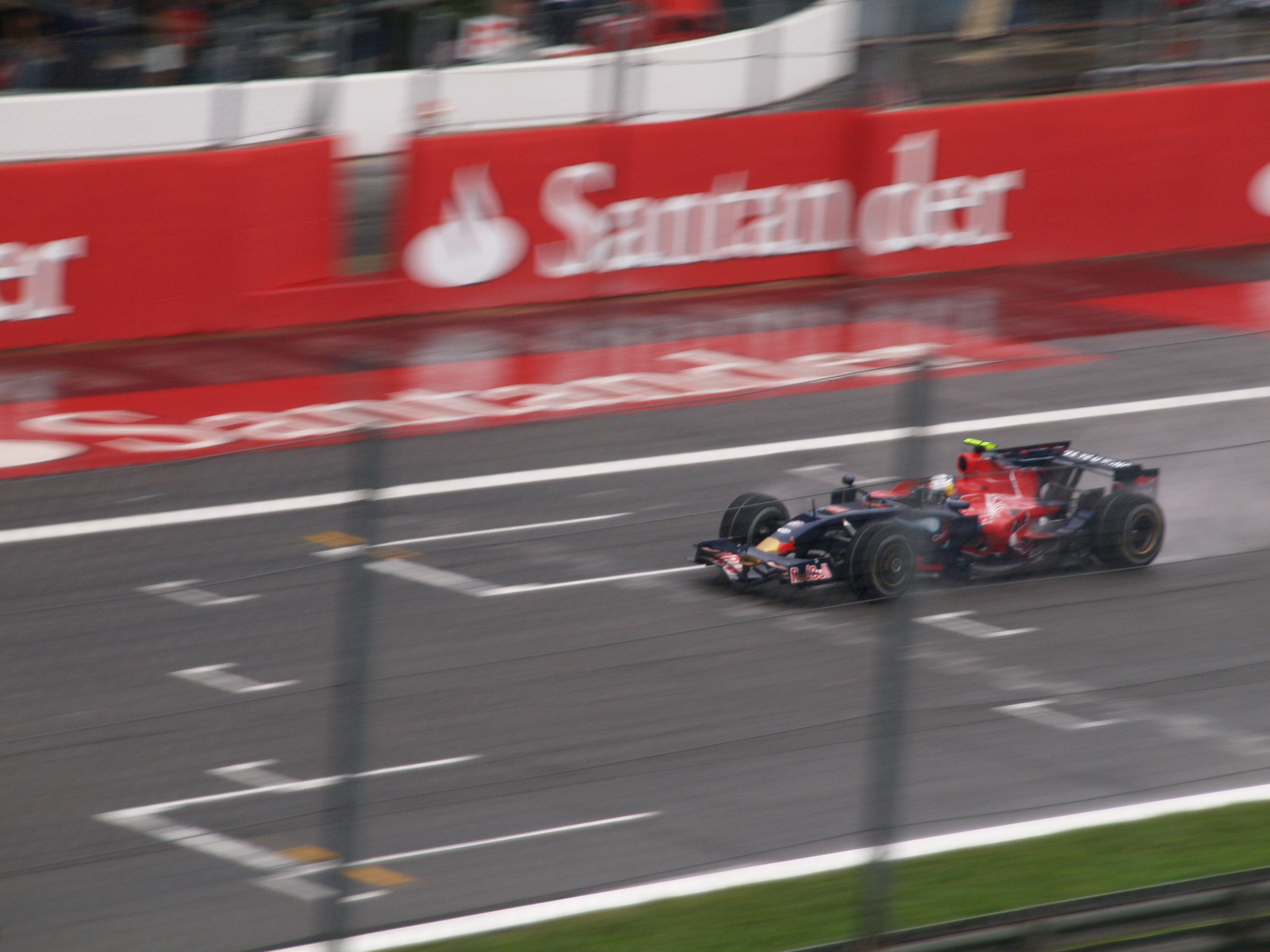
Vettel became the youngest F1 race winner, breaking the record Fernando Alonso set at the 2003 Hungarian Grand Prix. Vettel's record was broken when Max Verstappen won the 2016 Spanish Grand Prix.

=== Race classification ===
Pos	No	Driver	Constructor	Laps	Time/Retired	Grid	Points
1	15	(Germany) Sebastian Vettel	Toro Rosso-Ferrari	53	1:26:47.494	1	10
2	23	(Finland) Heikki Kovalainen	McLaren-Mercedes	53	+12.512	2	8
3	4	(Poland) Robert Kubica	BMW Sauber	53	+20.471	11	6
4	5	(Spain) Fernando Alonso	Renault	53	+23.903	8	5
5	3	(Germany) Nick Heidfeld	BMW Sauber	53	+27.748	10	4
6	2	(Brazil) Felipe Massa	Ferrari	53	+28.816	6	3
7	22	(United Kingdom) Lewis Hamilton	McLaren-Mercedes	53	+29.912	15	2
8	10	(Australia) Mark Webber	Red Bull-Renault	53	+32.048	3	1
9	1	(Finland) Kimi Räikkönen	Ferrari	53	+39.468	14	
10	6	(Brazil) Nelson Piquet Jr.	Renault	53	+54.445	17	
11	12	(Germany) Timo Glock	Toyota	53	+58.888	9	
12	8	(Japan) Kazuki Nakajima	Williams-Toyota	53	+1:02.015	PL^{1}	
13	11	(Italy) Jarno Trulli	Toyota	53	+1:05.954	7	
14	7	(Germany) Nico Rosberg	Williams-Toyota	53	+1:08.635	5	
15	16	(United Kingdom) Jenson Button	Honda	53	+1:13.370	PL^{1}	
16	9	(United Kingdom) David Coulthard	Red Bull-Renault	52	+1 Lap	13	
17	17	(Brazil) Rubens Barrichello	Honda	52	+1 Lap	16	
18	14	(France) Sébastien Bourdais	Toro Rosso-Ferrari	52	+1 Lap	PL^{1}	
19	20	(Germany) Adrian Sutil	Force India-Ferrari	51	+2 Laps	20	
Ret	21	(Italy) Giancarlo Fisichella	Force India-Ferrari	11	Accident	12	

Notes

- ^1 – Sébastien Bourdais, Kazuki Nakajima and Jenson Button started from the pitlane.

== Championship standings after the race ==
Drivers' Championship standings

Pos.	Driver	Points
1	(United Kingdom) Lewis Hamilton*	78
2	(Brazil) Felipe Massa*	77
3	(Poland) Robert Kubica*	64
4	(Finland) Kimi Räikkönen*	57
5	(Germany) Nick Heidfeld*	53

Constructors' Championship standings

Pos.	Constructor	Points
1	(Italy) Ferrari*	134
2	(United Kingdom) McLaren-Mercedes*	129
3	(Germany) BMW Sauber*	117
4	(Japan) Toyota	41
5	(France) Renault	41

- Note: Only the top five positions are included for both sets of standings.
- Bold text and an asterisk indicates competitors who still had a theoretical chance of becoming World Champion.

== See also ==
- 2008 Monza GP2 Series round

Previous race: 2008 Belgian Grand Prix	FIA Formula One World Championship; 2008 season	Next race: 2008 Singapore Grand Prix
Previous race: 2007 Italian Grand Prix	Italian Grand Prix	Next race: 2009 Italian Grand Prix
