= Timo Glock =

German racing driver (born 1982)

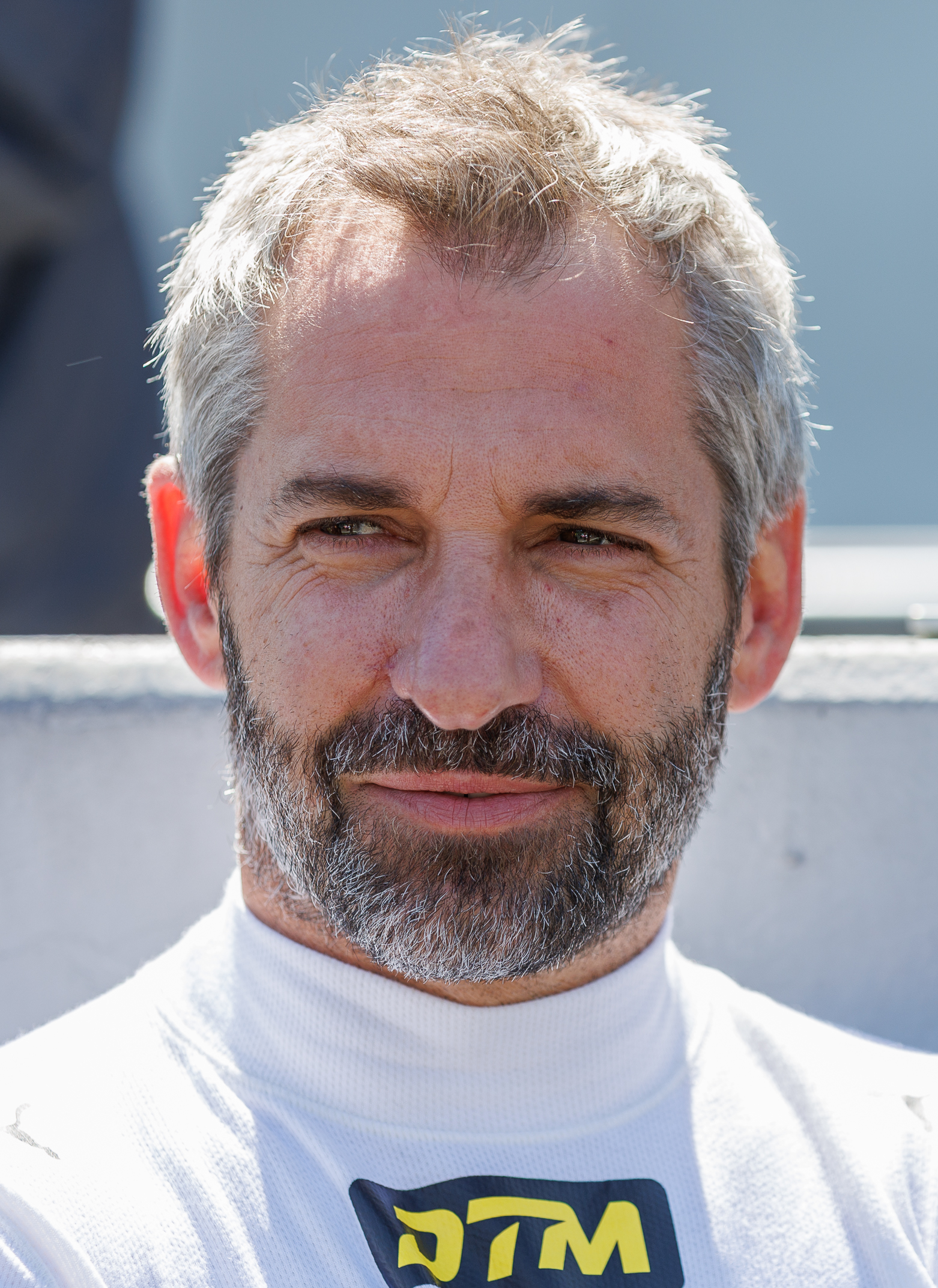
- Glock in 2025
- Born: 18 March 1982 (age 44); Lindenfels, Hesse, West Germany
- Spouse: Isabell Reis (m. 2015)
- Children: 1

Formula One World Championship career
- Nationality: (Germany) German
- Active years: 2004, 2008–2012
- Team(s): Jordan, Toyota, Virgin, Marussia
- Entries: 95 (91 starts)
- Championships: 0
- Wins: 0
- Podiums: 3
- Career points: 51
- Pole positions: 0
- Fastest laps: 1
- First entry: 2004 Canadian Grand Prix
- Last entry: 2012 Brazilian Grand Prix

DTM career
- Categorisation: FIA Platinum
- Years active: 2013–2022, 2025
- Teams: MTEK, RMG, RMR, ROWE, Ceccato, Dörr
- Engine: BMW, McLaren
- Starts: 180
- Championships: 0
- Wins: 5
- Podiums: 15
- Poles: 6
- Fastest laps: 6
- Best finish: 5th in 2018, 2020

Champ Car career
- Years active: 2005
- Team: Rocketsports
- Best finish: 8th (2005)
- First race: 2005 Toyota Grand Prix of Long Beach (Long Beach)
- Last race: 2005 Gran Premio Telmex/Tecate (Mexico City)
Wins	Podiums	Poles
0	1	0

Previous series
- 2006–2007; 2003; 2002; 2001; 2000: GP2 Series; F3 Euro Series; German F3; Formula BMW ADAC; ADAC Formula Junior

Championship titles
- 2007; 2001; 2000: GP2 Series; Formula BMW ADAC; ADAC Formula Junior

Timo Glock (German: [ˈtiːmo ɡlɔk]; born 18 March 1982) is a German racing driver, who competes in the Deutsche Tourenwagen Masters for Dörr Motorsport. Glock competed in Formula One between 2004 and 2012.

Glock raced briefly for Jordan in 2004 before exiting F1. He was then crowned GP2 Series champion in 2007 and graduated back to F1 with Toyota, finishing 10th in the World Drivers' Championship in both 2008 and 2009 with three podiums. After three seasons with Virgin and Marussia, Glock left Formula One and became a factory driver for BMW in the Deutsche Tourenwagen Masters, winning five races between 2013 and 2021. Glock returned to the DTM in 2025 with McLaren.

== Early career ==
Born in Lindenfels, West Germany, Glock began his motorsport career in 1998 at the age of 15. He won several karting championships as well as the BMW ADAC Formula Junior Cup in 2000 and the Formula BMW ADAC Championship in 2001. In his first German Formula Three Championship season in 2002, he finished third in the standings en route to rookie of the year honours. In 2003, he competed in the Formula Three Euroseries, winning three races and scoring three other podium finishes, which were enough to place him in fifth position in the Championship.

== Formula One ==
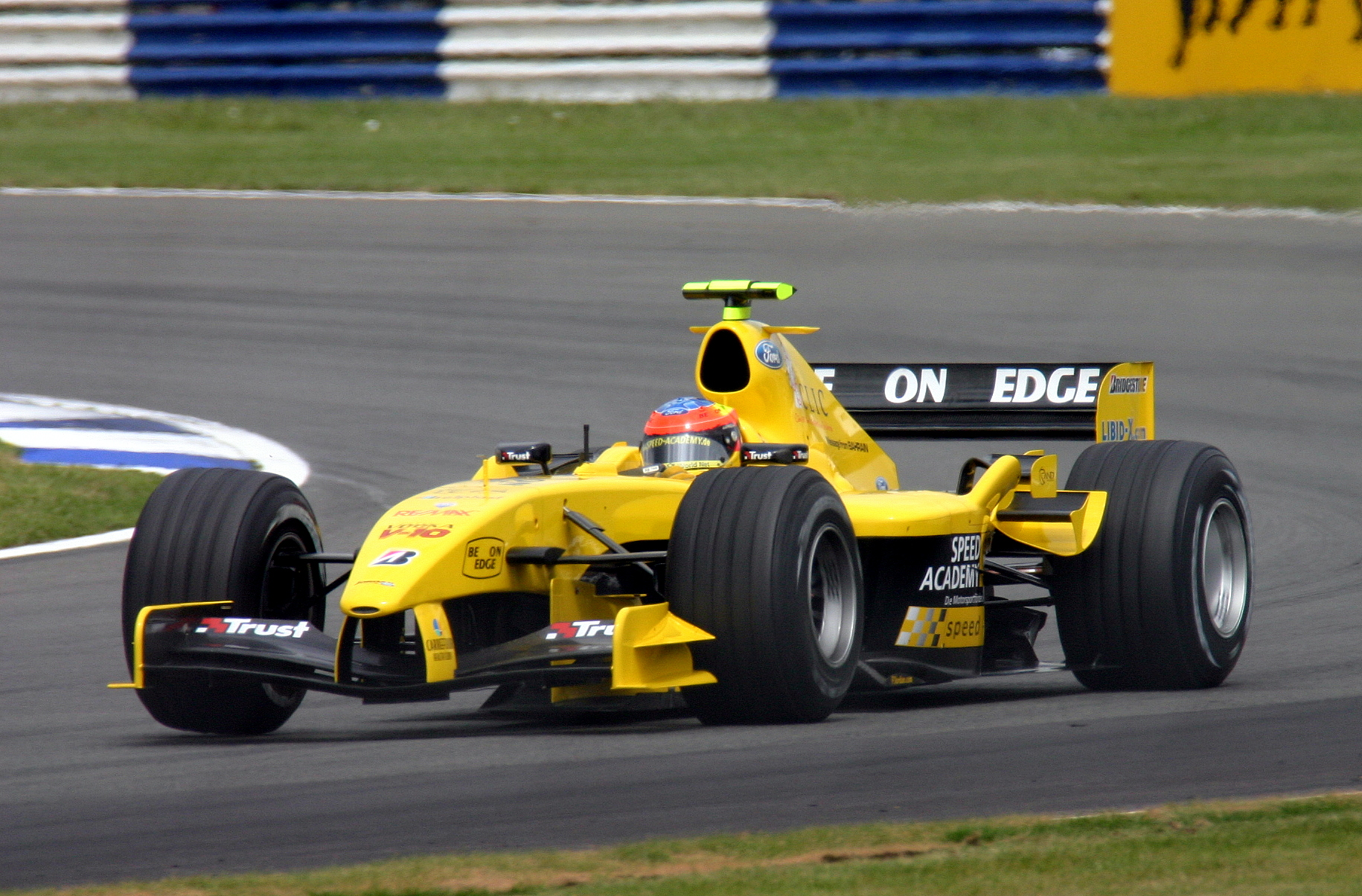
Glock driving for Jordan during free practice for the 2004 British Grand Prix.

=== Jordan (2004) ===
Glock was signed as Jordan Grand Prix's test driver for the 2004 Formula One season and made his Formula One debut at the Canadian Grand Prix replacing Giorgio Pantano, who had a contract dispute with Jordan. He finished 11th, but inherited seventh following the disqualification of the Williams and Toyota cars and thus scored two points on his debut.

Glock finished the season with Jordan, taking over from Pantano for the last three races. Glock's sponsorship with Deutsche Post helped bring back the colours of DHL to Jordan.

== Champ Car ==
=== 2005 ===
In 2005, Glock shifted his career to the United States, racing in the Champ Car World Series with Paul Gentilozzi's Rocketsports team. His best finish was second place at the Circuit Gilles Villeneuve at the Molson Indy Montreal in Canada, where he was defeated by Oriol Servià. In the closing laps of the race Glock twice retained the lead over Servia by missing the track's final chicane. As the rules require drivers who gain or retain a position by driving off the racing surface to give way, Glock was asked to move over by Champ Car officials, and let Servia take the lead. Glock obliged midway through the final lap, giving him enough time to try to take the lead back, but to no avail. Glock finished eighth in the final season points standings and won the Champ Car World Series' Rookie of the Year award.

== GP2 ==
=== 2006–2007 ===
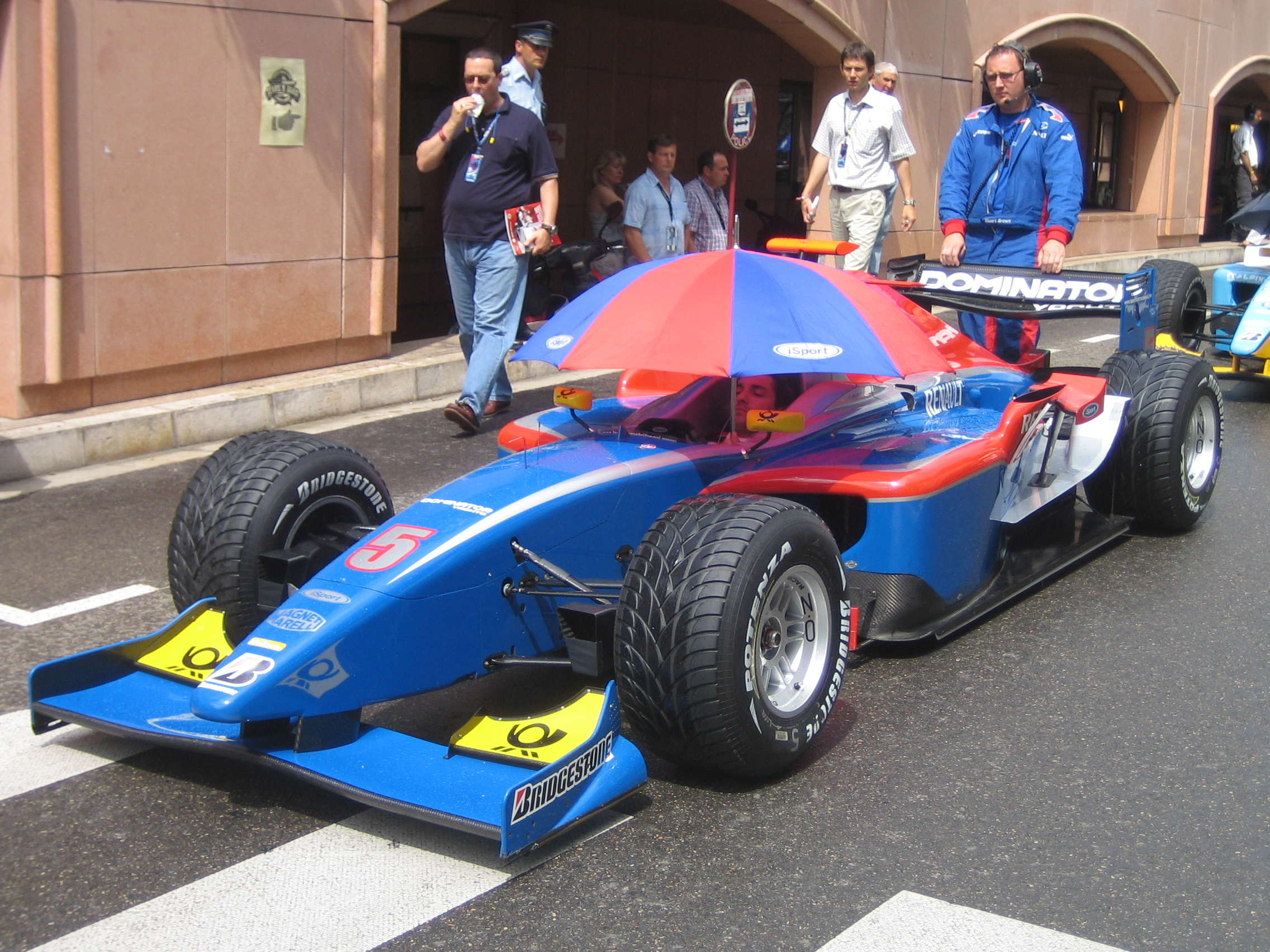
Glock in the cockpit of his GP2 car during the 2007 Monaco Grand Prix weekend

In 2006, Glock raced in Europe in the GP2 Series, the level immediately below Formula One. He started with the midfield BCN Competicion team, gaining average results. In mid-season, however, he moved to the front-running iSport team and after a string of improved results finished fourth in the drivers' standings, also winning an award for "most improved driver" in the series. In 2006 he tested an F1 car again for BMW Sauber, which led to him being signed in December as the team's second test driver for 2007.

Glock was also re-signed for 2007 by iSport and won one feature race and four sprint races on his way to the championship. Following the serious crash of regular Formula One BMW driver Robert Kubica in Canada, it was speculated that Glock might take over the drive. However, the team instead chose its lead test driver Sebastian Vettel. Vettel's drive as a fill-in helped him get a full-time racing seat with the Toro Rosso team later in the season, starting at the Hungarian Grand Prix, and Glock was then promoted to the main test and reserve driver for BMW.

== Return to Formula One ==
=== Toyota (2008–2009) ===
==== 2008 season ====
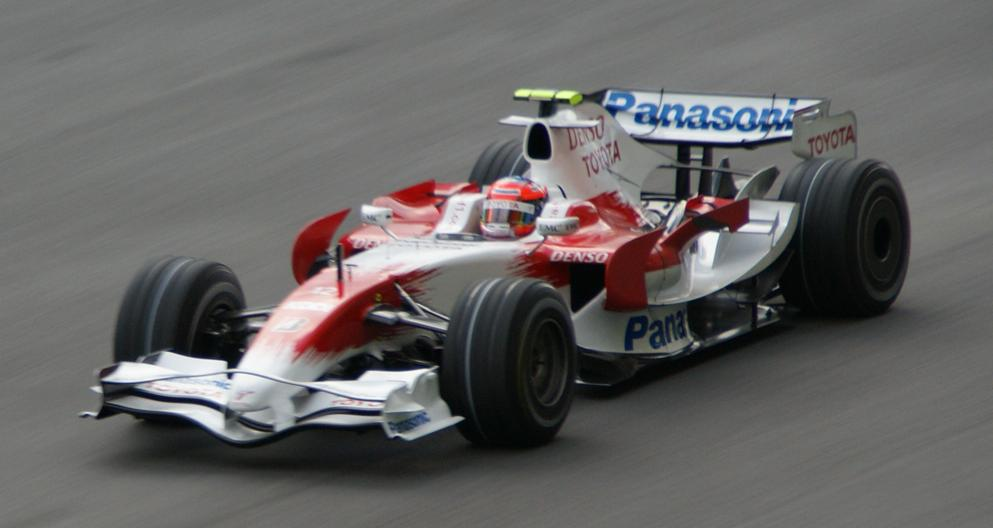
Glock driving for Toyota F1 at the 2008 Malaysian Grand Prix

After winning the GP2 Series in 2007, Glock was connected to several F1 teams. He signed a contract with Toyota F1, though still under a test driver contract with BMW, which led to the dispute being brought before the Contract Recognition Board. In November, the CRB ruled that Glock was free to race for Toyota in 2008 and shortly afterwards Glock signed a three-year contract to replace Ralf Schumacher at Toyota. He scored his first points of 2008 in the Canadian Grand Prix, finishing fourth ahead of Felipe Massa's Ferrari. Glock qualified a career-best fifth at the Hungarian Grand Prix, and finished the race in second place. At the Singapore Grand Prix, Glock finished fourth, one of his best of the season.

==== Infamous season finale moment ====
In the final race of the 2008 season, the Brazilian Grand Prix, Glock was seventh with a few laps to go when rain started covering the track. Glock remained on the track with dry-weather tyres, while most of the other drivers, including championship contender Lewis Hamilton, opted to pit for wet tyres. The decision to stay out moved Glock up the order, ahead of Hamilton on track. Starting the final lap, Glock was fourth but was struggling on his dry-weather tyres as the rain intensified. He was passed by Toro Rosso's Sebastian Vettel and McLaren's Lewis Hamilton in the final corners. Hamilton regained fifth place to win the 2008 Drivers' Championship and eclipsed rival Felipe Massa by one point, while Glock trailed behind in sixth. The incident led to significant backlash from many Brazilian fans who were in support of Massa, insinuating Glock was at fault for Hamilton's win. Glock revealed years later that he and the Toyota team members had a police escort them off the country to protect him from further abuse. During live ITV coverage of the race, commentator Martin Brundle shouted "Is that Glock going slowly?" during Hamilton's overtake on him, which would become an internet meme.

Glock finished the 2008 championship in tenth position, with 25 points, behind teammate Jarno Trulli.

==== 2009 season ====
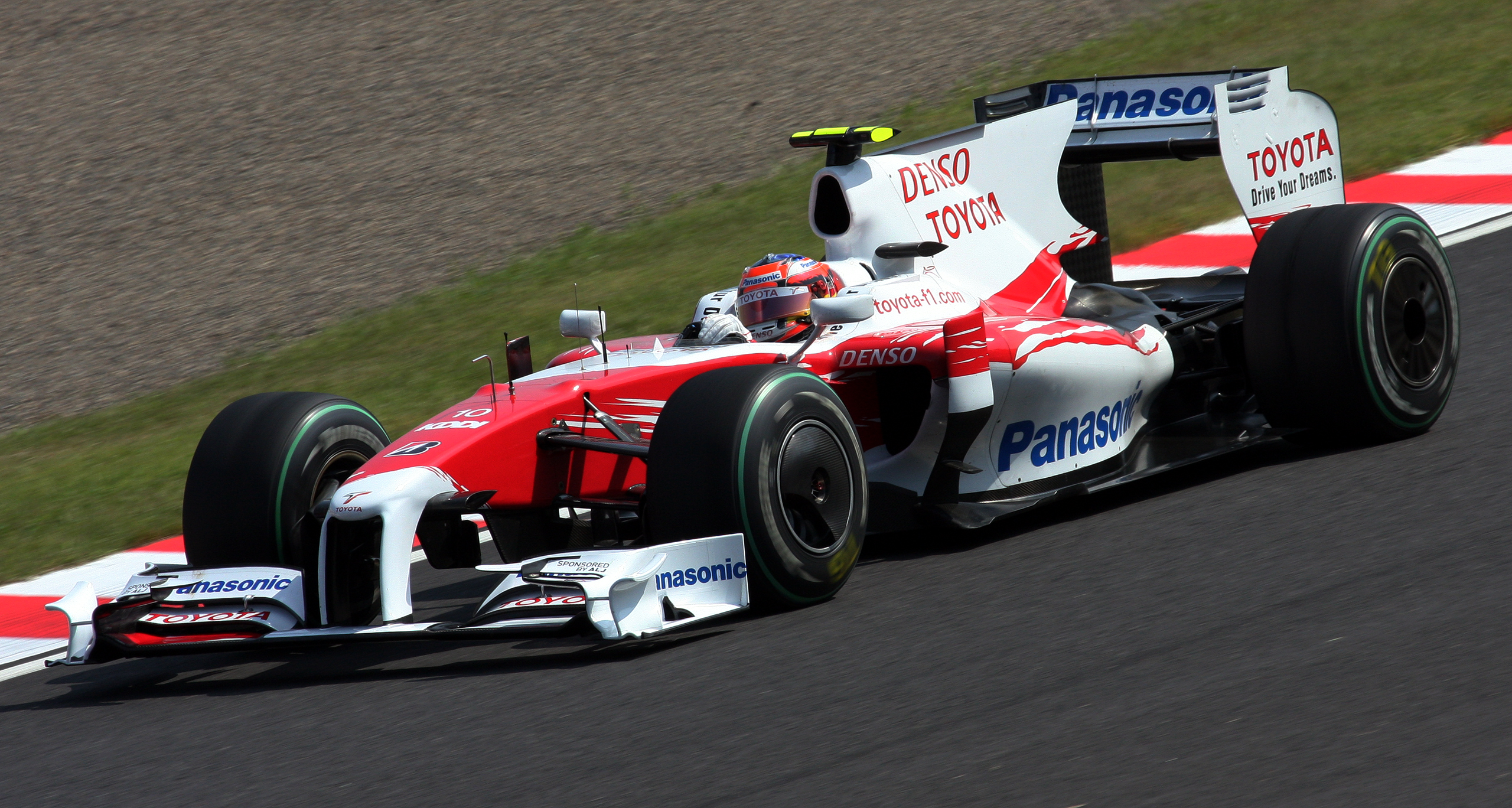
Glock during practice for the 2009 Japanese Grand Prix, which he missed after sustaining an injury during qualifying

After being in the top-ten in all three practice sessions in Australia, Glock qualified sixth on the grid. However, the rear wing of his (and teammate Trulli's) Toyota was deemed to be too flexible and thus illegal, and his time was cleared and he started 19th. During the race, he worked his way through the pack to finish in fifth place. However, after the race, Lewis Hamilton was disqualified and stripped of his fourth-place finish, and Glock was promoted to fourth. A week later in Malaysia, he qualified fifth, but started third after penalties to both Sebastian Vettel and Rubens Barrichello. At the start of the race, Glock slipped to eighth, but an inspired tyre choice as the rain started, coupled with precise driving, saw Glock finish in third when the race was ended early on lap 32.

Consecutive seventh places for Glock in the rain in China, and in the dry in Bahrain had given him a total of 12 points for the season, although these finishes came in contrasting ways. In China, he qualified 14th, not making it out of Qualifying 2, whilst in Bahrain he qualified second, led the race in the first stint, but he had a poor second stint on hard tyres which forced him to battle his way back to seventh by the end of the race. Glock earned his second podium of the season when he finished second behind Lewis Hamilton at the Singapore Grand Prix after qualifying in sixth. The race began well when Glock passed Alonso and was given a place by Mark Webber who was forced to let Alonso overtake. Late in the race Glock seemed set for third place until Nico Rosberg crossed the white line exiting the pits, earning him a drive through penalty and allowing Glock to easily take second place.

In qualifying for the 2009 Japanese Grand Prix, Glock crashed heavily at the last corner and was airlifted to hospital with a leg injury. As he was not fit to race, Jarno Trulli was the only driver representing Toyota. On 11 October 2009, Toyota confirmed that its test driver Kamui Kobayashi would make his race debut in the Brazilian Grand Prix, as Glock had suffered further complications from his accident, resulting in a cracked vertebra and he would not be guaranteed to be fit in time to race in Brazil and Abu Dhabi. Toyota pulled out of F1 at the end of 2009, leaving an uncertain future for Glock.

=== Virgin (2010–2011) ===
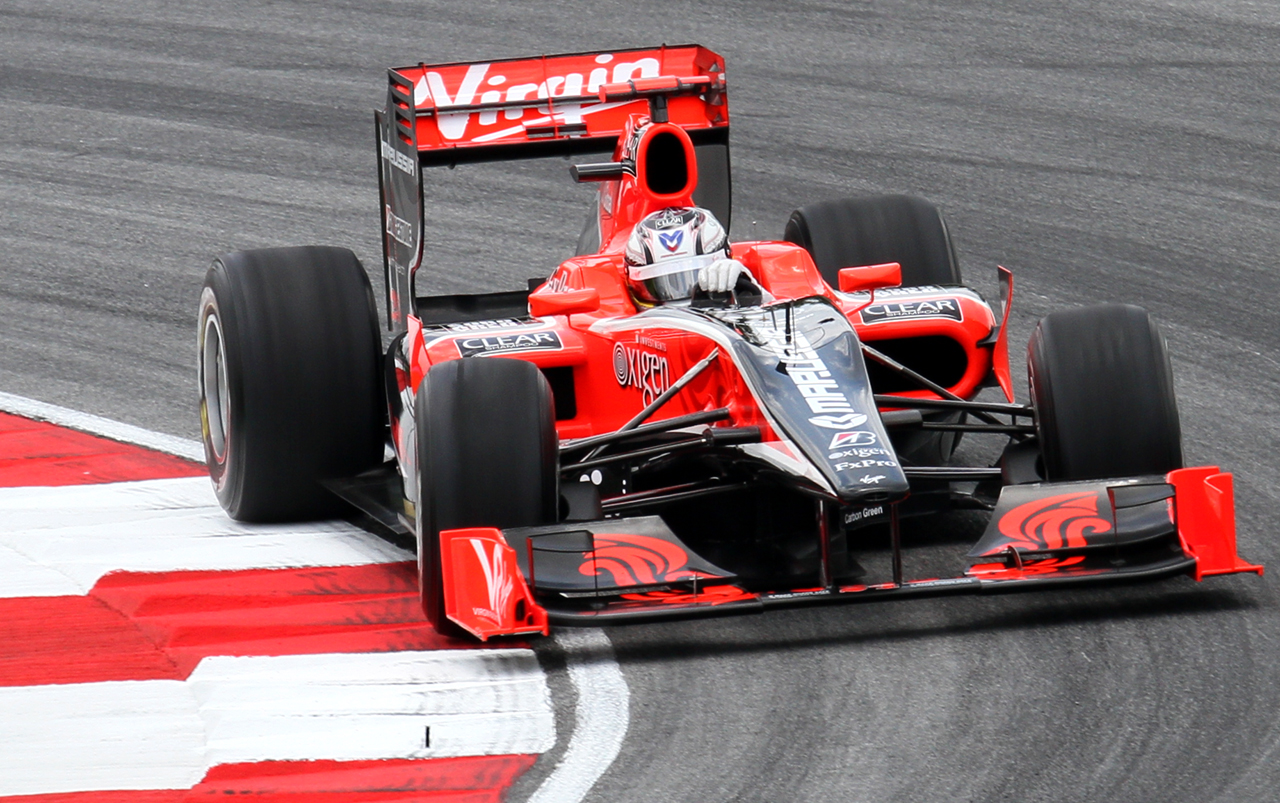
Glock driving for Virgin Racing at the 2010 Malaysian Grand Prix

Glock's future for a time appeared uncertain, but on 17 November new team Manor Grand Prix announced that he had signed for them and would be their lead driver for the 2010 and 2011 seasons. It seemed as though Glock would partner Polish driver Robert Kubica at Renault, but following Renault's decision to announce whether it will take part in Formula 1 for 2010, Glock chose an option where he will be guaranteed a drive although the car might be less competitive. Manor became Virgin Racing in November 2009 and that Glock's former GP2 rival Lucas di Grassi would become his teammate. Glock started the 2010 season with three successive retirements in Bahrain, Australia and Malaysia. In addition, he failed to start the Chinese Grand Prix due to engine failure; This was despite good qualifying performances which saw him out-qualify all of the new teams' drivers in Bahrain and regularly start higher than his teammate Di Grassi. The Spanish Grand Prix was where he recorded his first finish for the team, and his first finish of the season with 18th place. Glock's best result of the season saw him finish in 14th in Japan, the team's best result of the year.

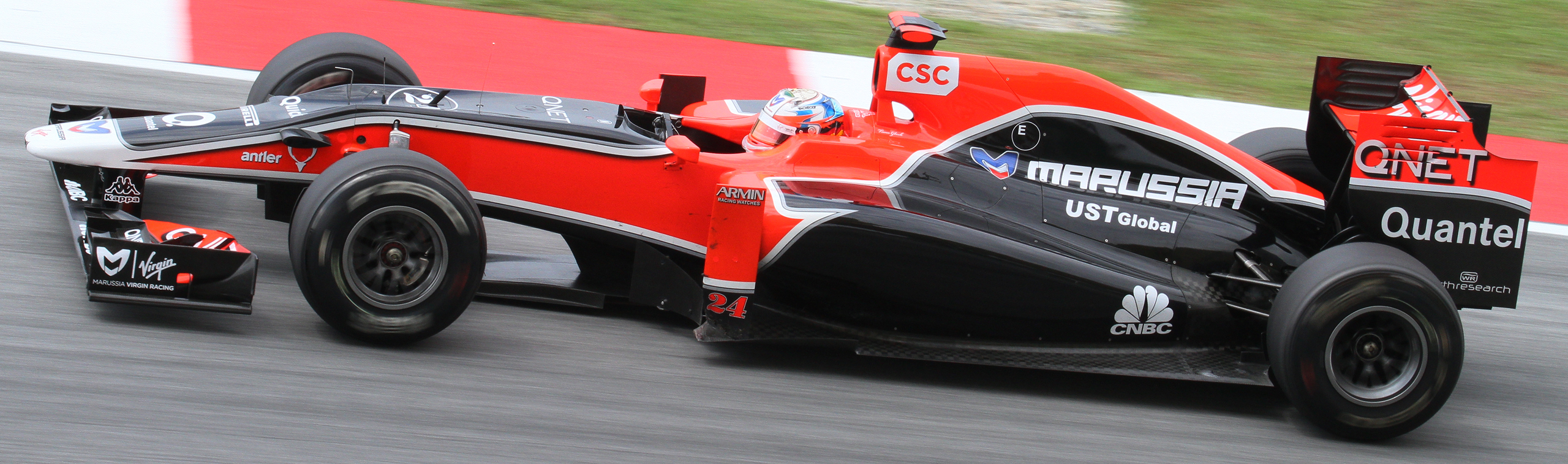
Timo Glock at the 2011 Malaysian Grand Prix

In 2011, Jérôme d'Ambrosio joined Glock at the team, where he failed to start the Turkish Grand Prix.

On 24 July 2011, it was announced that Glock had signed a three-year extension to his current contract, committing him to Virgin until 2014.

=== Marussia (2012) ===
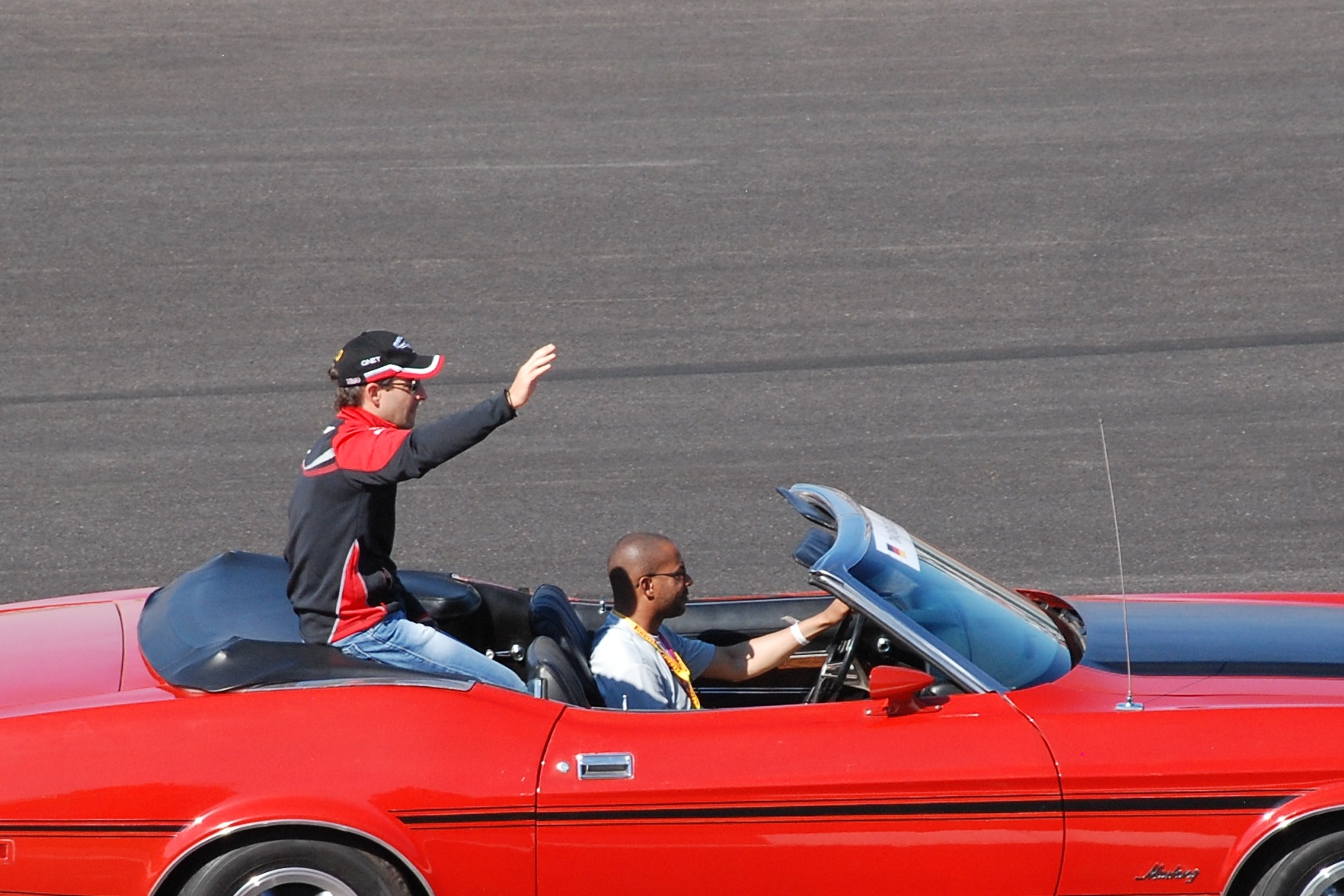
Glock at the 2012 US Grand Prix

The team was renamed as Marussia F1 for the 2012 season and he would partner his third teammate in his three years at the team, French rookie Charles Pic. Marussia were forced to pull out of pre-season testing after failing a crash test for rear impact but eventually they passed allowing Glock to compete in the opening race. Glock started the 2012 season strongly by finishing 14th in Australia which equaled his highest ever finish with the Virgin/Marussia team. Glock came 17th in Malaysia, and then scored two consecutive 19th-place finishes in China and Bahrain. Furthermore, he finished 18th in the Spanish Grand Prix, before he achieved 14th again in Monaco and retired from the Canadian Grand Prix race with a brake malfunction.

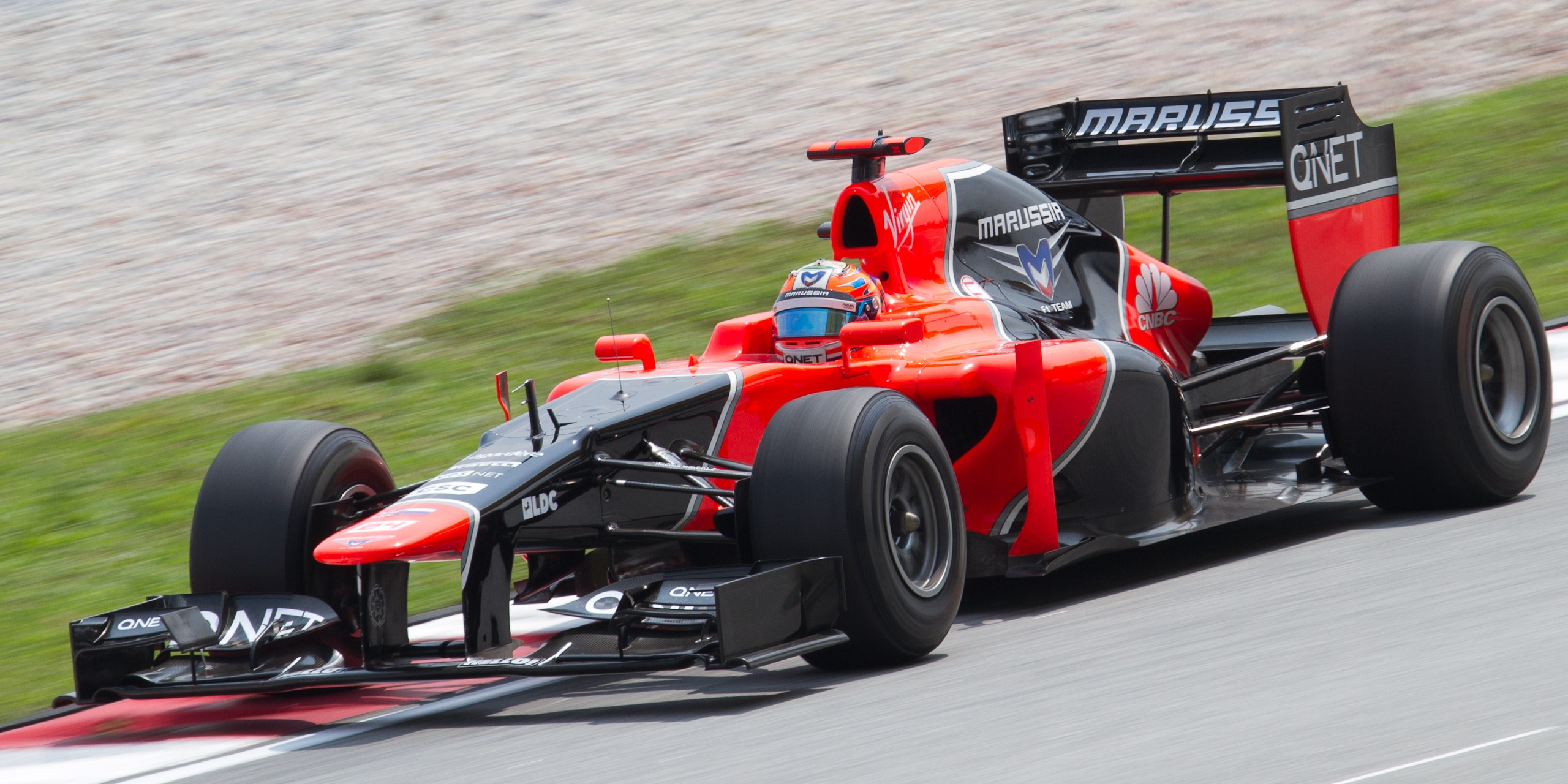
Glock driving at the 2012 Malaysian Grand Prix

Glock withdrew from the European Grand Prix after contracting a stomach bug. However, he was fit in time for the British Grand Prix where he finished 18th, and he followed that up with 22nd at his home Grand Prix. It was reported at the Hungarian Grand Prix that a feud was brewing between Glock and his teammate after Pic blocked him during qualifying. Glock finished the race 21st after battling with Michael Schumacher and Pedro de la Rosa. Glock finished 15th at Spa after a collision with Pastor Maldonado. He suffered no damage and finished ahead of his teammate as they battled in the final stages of the race while also getting lapped by other cars. At Monza, he finished 17th after sustaining front wing damage after colliding with Vitaly Petrov in the second corner of lap 1.

However, at Singapore, Glock produced his best result for Marussia, finishing in 12th place after a faultless performance. This crucially pushed Marussia into 10th place in the Constructors' Championship, due to a better non-points finishing record. In Japan Glock was up to 11th by the second lap after two first corner incidents, however he finished 16th. In Korea he finished 18th, and in India he came 20th after another battle with Michael Schumacher. He encountered Schumacher again in Abu Dhabi and let him pass to overtake Heikki Kovalainen who was in the crucial 12th place needed to demote Marussia to 11th in the Constructors' Championship. In São Paulo, he was running strongly and ahead of the Caterhams until he was hit by Jean-Éric Vergne. He claimed this 'destroyed his race' with Petrov ultimately passing Charles Pic to take tenth spot for Caterham in the championship. Glock finished the season 20th in the Drivers' Championship; his best yet for the Virgin/Marussia team.

For the 2013 season, Glock was due to remain with Marussia and partner Max Chilton who would have been his fourth teammate in four years at the team, however on 21 January 2013 it was confirmed that Glock had left Marussia by mutual consent. Glock was supposed to be replaced by Luiz Razia, but due to funding issues Razia's contract was terminated prior to the start of the season. He would ultimately be replaced by Jules Bianchi.

== DTM ==
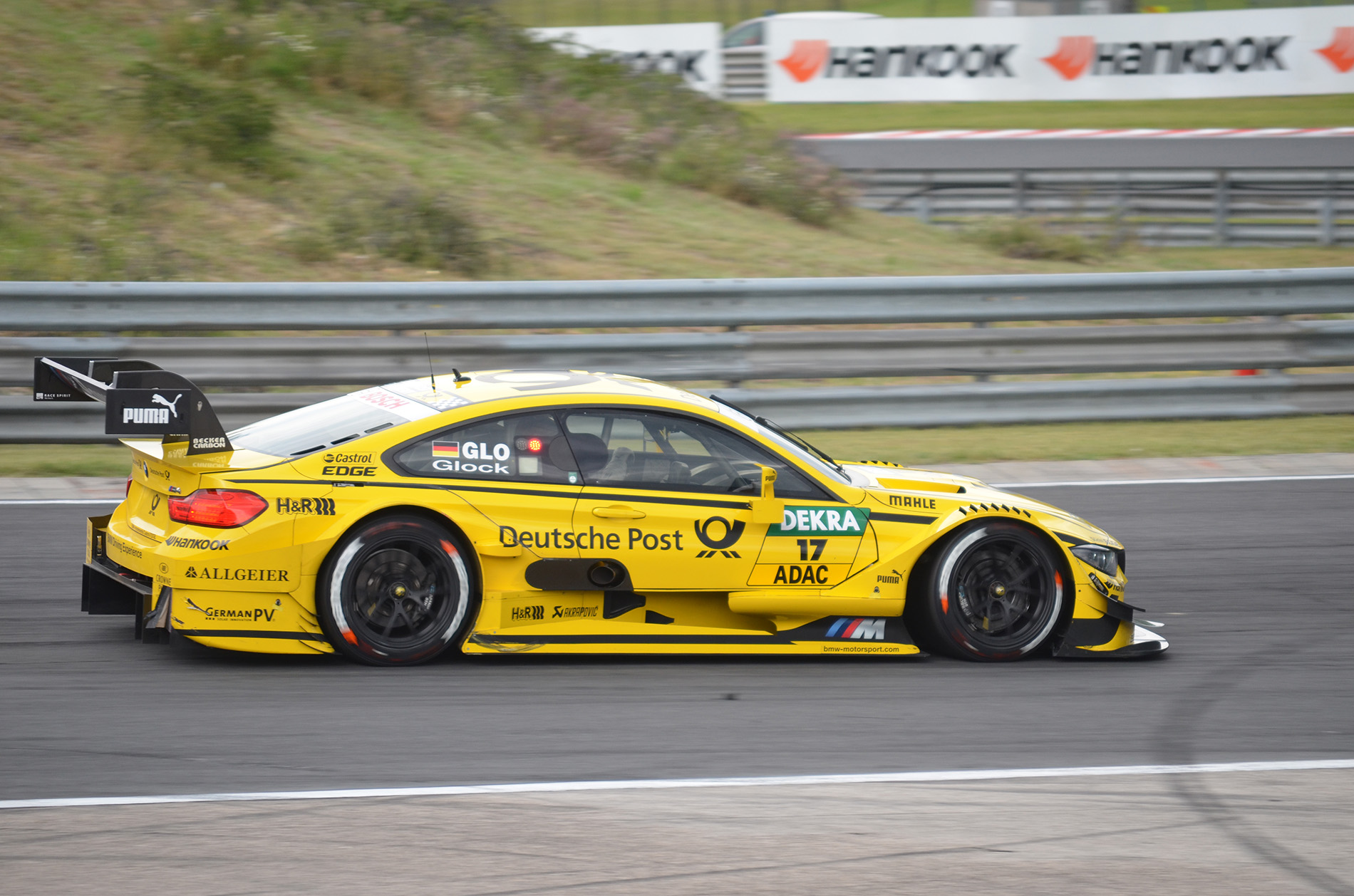
Glock at the 2014 Hungarian DTM race

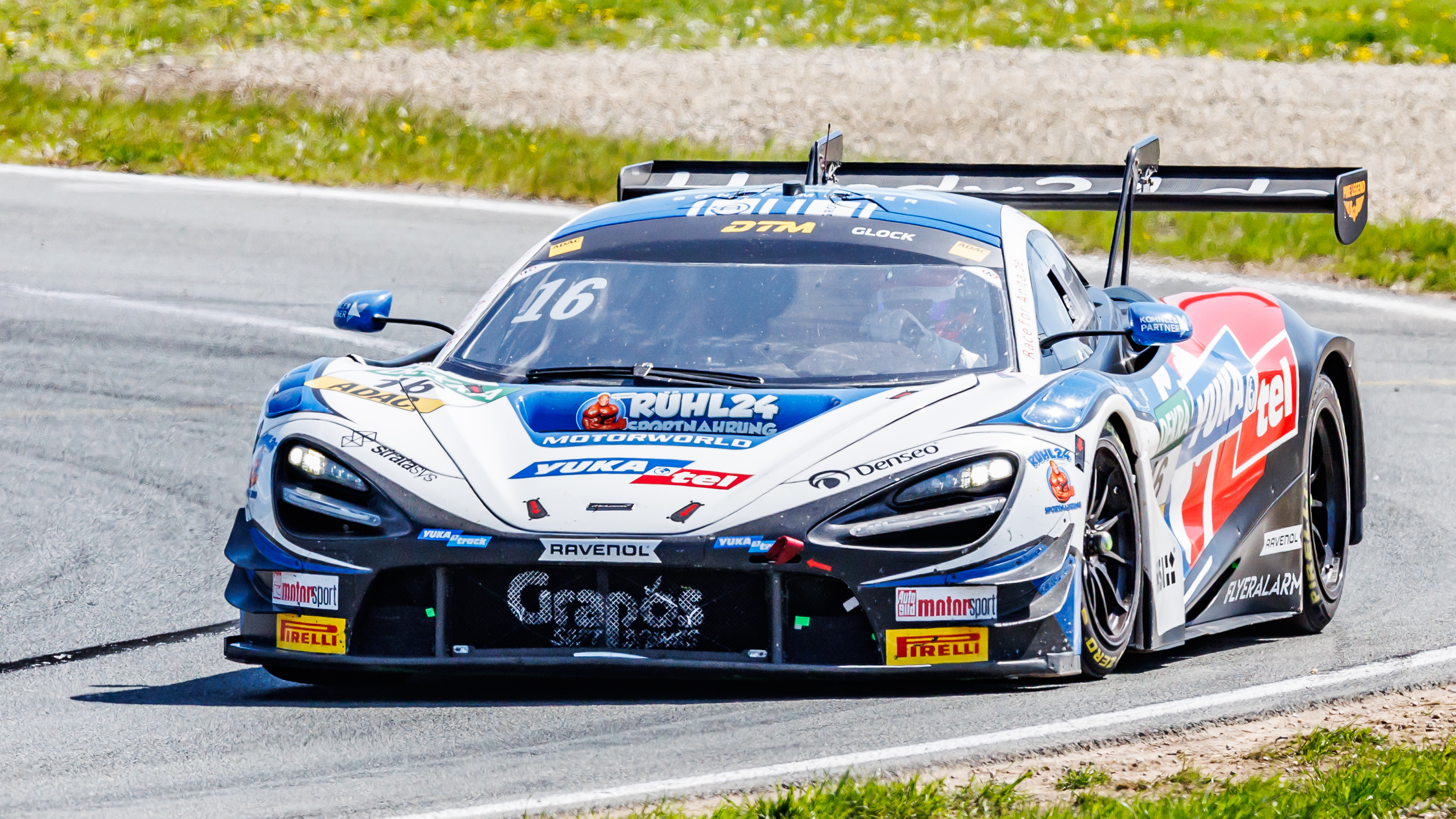
Glock at Motorsport Arena Oschersleben in 2025

Glock switched to the DTM in 2013, signing for BMW. In his third race he scored his first points and podium with third place. He would not score any more points until the final race of the season at Hockenheim, where he won his first DTM race of his career.

== Porsche Supercup ==
In 2004, Glock made his Porsche Supercup debut for the Porsche AG Team for a one-off start at the Nürburgring finishing sixth in Race 1 and seventh in Race 2.

In 2023, Glock returned as a guest driver for Porsche Motorsport in the number No. 911 at the Hungaroring and Monza, finishing his first race in 19 years in 15th, scoring a point but was not eligible due to being a guest driver, and in Monza finishing ninth. He returned in 2024, once again for Dr.Ing h.c. F. Porsche AG in the No. 911, this time driving in the round at the Red Bull Ring, finishing 18th.

== Broadcasting career ==
Glock joined the German television broadcaster RTL as a pundit on its coverage of Formula One from 2018 to 2020. Since 2021, he has worked as an analyst for the pay-TV broadcaster Sky Sport after the broadcaster obtained exclusive broadcasting rights for Formula One in Germany.

== Personal life ==
Glock lives in Switzerland with his wife, German model Isabell Reis. She travels the world with him during the season. Glock and Reis are neighbours and close friends with former Lotus, McLaren, Renault and Caterham F1 driver Heikki Kovalainen and his British wife Catherine Hyde.

== Racing record ==
=== Career summary ===
Season	Series	Team	Races	Wins	Poles	F/Laps	Podiums	Points	Position
2000	ADAC Formula Junior Cup		19	11	6	N/A	15	285.5	**1st**
2001	Formula BMW ADAC	BMW Formel ADAC Rookie Team	20	8	3	N/A	13	268	**1st**
2002	German Formula 3 Championship	Opel Team KMS	18	3	2	3	6	52	**3rd**
2003	Formula 3 Euro Series	Opel Team KMS	20	3	0	1	6	55	5th
2003	Masters of Formula 3	Opel Team KMS	1	0	0	0	0	0	30th
2004	Porsche Supercup	Porsche AG VIP Team	1	0	0	N/A	0	0	NC^{†}
2004	Formula One	Jordan Ford	4	0	0	0	0	2	19th
2005	Champ Car World Series	Rocketsports Racing	13	0	0	1	1	202	8th
2006	GP2 Series	BCN Competición	9	0	0	0	0	60	4th
2006	GP2 Series	iSport International	11	2	0	1	5	60	4th
2007	GP2 Series	iSport International	20	5	4	4	10	88	**1st**
2007	Formula One	BMW Sauber F1 Team	Test driver						
2008	Formula One	Panasonic Toyota Racing	18	0	0	0	1	25	10th
2009	Formula One	Panasonic Toyota Racing	14	0	0	1	2	24	10th
2010	Formula One	Virgin Racing	19	0	0	0	0	0	25th
2011	Formula One	Marussia Virgin Racing	19	0	0	0	0	0	25th
2012	Formula One	Marussia F1 Team	20	0	0	0	0	0	20th
2013	Deutsche Tourenwagen Masters	BMW Team MTEK	10	1	0	0	2	40	9th
2014	Deutsche Tourenwagen Masters	BMW Team MTEK	10	0	0	0	1	33	16th
2015	Deutsche Tourenwagen Masters	BMW Team MTEK	18	1	1	2	1	56	15th
2015	Blancpain Endurance Series	ROAL Motorsport	2	0	0	0	0	4	38th
2016	Deutsche Tourenwagen Masters	BMW Team RMG	18	1	0	0	1	84	10th
2017	Deutsche Tourenwagen Masters	BMW Team RMG	18	1	3	0	4	133	7th
2017	Intercontinental GT Challenge	Team Castrol Vodafone	1	0	0	0	0	0	NC
2018	Deutsche Tourenwagen Masters	BMW Team RMR	20	1	0	1	5	144	5th
2019	Deutsche Tourenwagen Masters	BMW Team RMR	18	0	0	1	0	58	12th
2020	Deutsche Tourenwagen Masters	BMW Team RMG	18	0	1	0	1	120	5th
2021	Deutsche Tourenwagen Masters	ROWE Racing	16	0	0	0	0	9	17th
2021	GT World Challenge Europe Endurance Cup	Walkenhorst Motorsport	3	0	0	0	0	9	22nd
2021	IMSA SportsCar Championship – GTLM	BMW Team RLL	1	0	0	0	0	286	14th
2022	Stock Car Brasil	Lubrax Podium	0	0	0	0	0	0	NC†
2022	Italian GT Championship – GT3 Sprint	Ceccato Motors	8	1	3	4	5	78	**2nd**
2022	Deutsche Tourenwagen Masters	Ceccato Motors	2	0	0	0	0	0	NC†
2023	Porsche Supercup	Porsche Motorsport	2	0	0	0	0	0	NC†
2024	Nürburgring Langstrecken-Serie – BMW M240i								
2024	Nürburgring Langstrecken-Serie – SP9	Falken Motorsports							
2024	Porsche Supercup	Porsche Motorsport	1	0	0	0	0	0	NC†
2024	Ferrari Challenge Europe – Trofeo Pirelli (Pro)	Autohaus Ulrich	4	0	0	1	3	43	7th
2024	24 Hours of Nürburgring – SP8T	Cerny Motorsport							
2025	Deutsche Tourenwagen Masters	Dörr Motorsport	16	0	0	1	0	22	22nd
2026	Deutsche Tourenwagen Masters	Dörr Motorsport	16	0	0	1	0	30	19th
2026	Nürburgring Langstrecken-Serie – SP9	Dörr Motorsport							

^{†} As Glock was a guest driver he was ineligible to score points.
^{*} Season still in progress.

=== Complete German Formula Three Championship/Formula Three Euro Series results ===
(key) (Races in bold indicate pole position) (Races in italics indicate fastest lap)

Year	Entrant	Chassis	Engine	1	2	3	4	5	6	7	8	9	10	11	12	13	14	15	16	17	18	19	20	DC	Pts
2002	Opel Team KMS	Dallara F302	Opel	HOC; 1; 17	**HOC**; **2**; 6	NÜR; 1 C	NÜR; 2 C	SAC; 1 Ret	SAC; 2; 1	NOR; 1 Ret	NOR; 2; 9	LAU; 1; 3	LAU; 2; 4	HOC; 1; 7	HOC; 2; 19	NÜR; 1; 1	NÜR; 2; 2	A1R; 1 Ret	A1R; 2; 1	ZAN; 1 Ret	ZAN; 2; 11	HOC; 1; 2	**HOC**; **2**; 4	3rd	52
2003	Opel Team KMS	Dallara F303	Spiess-Opel	HOC; 1; 6	HOC; 2; 7	ADR; 1; 1	ADR; 2; 13	PAU; 1; 3	PAU; 2 Ret	NOR; 1; 2	NOR; 2; 3	LMS; 1; 18	LMS; 2; 25	NÜR; 1; 14	NÜR; 2; 12	A1R; 1; 12	A1R; 2; 9	ZAN; 1; 15	ZAN; 2; 14	HOC; 1; 1	HOC; 2; 22	MAG; 1; 13	MAG; 2; 1	5th	55

=== Complete Porsche Supercup results ===
(key) (Races in bold indicate pole position) (Races in italics indicate fastest lap)

Year	Team	1	2	3	4	5	6	7	8	9	10	11	12	DC	Points
2004	Porsche AG	IMO	CAT	MON	NÜR; 7	USA	USA	MAG	SIL	HOC	HUN	SPA	MNZ	NC‡	0‡
2023	Porsche Motorsport	MON	RBR	SIL	HUN; 15	SPA	ZND	ZND	MNZ; 11					NC‡	0‡
2024	Porsche Motorsport	IMO	MON	RBR; 18	SIL	HUN	SPA	ZND	MNZ					NC‡	0‡

‡ As Glock was a guest driver, he was ineligible for points.

=== Complete Formula One results ===
(key) (Races in bold indicate pole position) (Races in italics indicate fastest lap)

Year	Entrant	Chassis	Engine	1	2	3	4	5	6	7	8	9	10	11	12	13	14	15	16	17	18	19	20	WDC	Points
2004	Jordan Ford	Jordan EJ14	Ford RS2 3.0 V10	AUS; TD	MAL; TD	BHR; TD	SMR; TD	ESP; TD	MON; TD	EUR; TD	CAN; 7	USA; TD	FRA; TD	GBR; TD	GER; TD	HUN; TD	BEL; TD	ITA; TD	CHN; 15	JPN; 15	BRA; 15			19th	2
2008	Panasonic Toyota Racing	Toyota TF108	Toyota RVX-08 2.4 V8	AUS; Ret	MAL; Ret	BHR; 9	ESP; 11	TUR; 13	MON; 12	CAN; 4	FRA; 11	GBR; 12	GER; Ret	HUN; 2	EUR; 7	BEL; 9	ITA; 11	SIN; 4	JPN; Ret	CHN; 7	BRA; 6			10th	25
2009	Panasonic Toyota Racing	Toyota TF109	Toyota RVX-09 2.4 V8	AUS; 4	MAL; 3^{‡}	CHN; 7	BHR; 7	ESP; 10	MON; 10	TUR; 8	GBR; 9	GER; 9	HUN; 6	EUR; 14	BEL; 10	ITA; 11	SIN; 2	JPN; DNS	BRA	ABU				10th	24
2010	Virgin Racing	Virgin VR-01	Cosworth CA2010 2.4 V8	BHR; Ret	AUS; Ret	MAL; Ret	CHN; DNS	ESP; 18	MON; Ret	TUR; 18	CAN; Ret	EUR; 19	GBR; 18	GER; 18	HUN; 16	BEL; 18	ITA; 17	SIN; Ret	JPN; 14	KOR; Ret	BRA; 20	ABU; Ret		25th	0
2011	Marussia Virgin Racing	Virgin MVR-02	Cosworth CA2011 2.4 V8	AUS; NC	MAL; 16	CHN; 21	TUR; DNS	ESP; 19	MON; Ret	CAN; 15	EUR; 21	GBR; 16	GER; 17	HUN; 17	BEL; 18	ITA; 15	SIN; Ret	JPN; 20	KOR; 18	IND; Ret	ABU; 19	BRA; Ret		25th	0
2012	Marussia F1 Team	Marussia MR01	Cosworth CA2012 2.4 V8	AUS; 14	MAL; 17	CHN; 19	BHR; 19	ESP; 18	MON; 14	CAN; Ret	EUR; DNS	GBR; 18	GER; 22	HUN; 21	BEL; 15	ITA; 17	SIN; 12	JPN; 16	KOR; 18	IND; 20	ABU; 14	USA; 19	BRA; 16	20th	0

^{‡} Half points were awarded at the 2009 Malaysian Grand Prix as less than 75% of the race distance was completed.

=== Complete Champ Car Series results ===
(key) (Races in bold indicate pole position) (Races in italics indicate fastest lap)

Year	Team	No.	1	2	3	4	5	6	7	8	9	10	11	12	13	Rank	Points	Ref
2005	Rocketsports	8	LBH; 6	MTY; 11	MIL; 9	POR; 10	CLE; 10	TOR; 7	EDM; 13	SJO; 6	DEN; 13	MTL; 2	LVG; 8	SRF; 6	MXC; 5	**8th**	**202**	

=== Complete GP2 Series results ===
(key) (Races in bold indicate pole position) (Races in italics indicate fastest lap)

Year	Entrant	1	2	3	4	5	6	7	8	9	10	11	12	13	14	15	16	17	18	19	20	21	DC	Points
2006	BCN Competición	VAL; FEA; 16	VAL; SPR; 8	IMO; FEA; 7	IMO; SPR; 4	NÜR; FEA; 17	NÜR; SPR; Ret	CAT; FEA; 11	CAT; SPR; 10	MON; FEA; Ret													4th	58
2006	iSport International										SIL; FEA; 2	SIL; SPR; 6	MAG; FEA; 1	MAG; SPR; 4	HOC; FEA; 3	HOC; SPR; 1	HUN; FEA; 2	HUN; SPR; 5	IST; FEA; 4	IST; SPR; 4	MNZ; FEA; Ret	MNZ; SPR; DNS	4th	58
2007	iSport International	BHR; FEA; 2	BHR; SPR; 2	**CAT**; **FEA**; 2	CAT; SPR; 1	MON; FEA; 3	**MAG**; **FEA**; Ret	MAG; SPR; Ret	SIL; FEA; Ret	SIL; SPR; Ret	**NÜR**; **FEA**; 1	NÜR; SPR; 5	**HUN**; **FEA**; 10	HUN; SPR; Ret	IST; FEA; 4	IST; SPR; 1	MNZ; FEA; 3	MNZ; SPR; 1	SPA; FEA; 17	SPA; SPR; DNS	VAL; FEA; 7	VAL; SPR; 1	1st	88

=== Complete Deutsche Tourenwagen Masters results ===
(key) (Races in bold indicate pole position) (Races in italics indicate fastest lap)

Year	Team	Car	1	2	3	4	5	6	7	8	9	10	11	12	13	14	15	16	17	18	19	20	Pos	Points
2013	BMW Team MTEK	BMW M3 DTM	HOC; Ret	BRH; 13	SPL; 3	LAU; 14	NOR; 13	MSC; 16	NÜR; 18	OSC; 15	ZAN; 18	HOC; 1											9th	40
2014	BMW Team MTEK	BMW M4 DTM	HOC; 5	OSC; Ret	HUN; 19	NOR; 16	MSC; 6	SPL; 3	NÜR; 17	LAU; Ret	ZAN; 12	HOC; 11											16th	33
2015	BMW Team MTEK	BMW M4 DTM	HOC; 1; 8	HOC; 2; 10	LAU; 1; 18	LAU; 2; 12	NOR; 1; 13	NOR; 2 Ret	ZAN; 1; 6	ZAN; 2; 4	SPL; 1; 19	SPL; 2; 14	MSC; 1 Ret	MSC; 2; 17	**OSC**; **1**; 1	OSC; 2; 7	NÜR; 1; 13	NÜR; 2; 20	HOC; 1; 18†	HOC; 2; 21			15th	56
2016	BMW Team RMG	BMW M4 DTM	HOC; 1 Ret	HOC; 2 DSQ	SPL; 1; 4	SPL; 2; 1	LAU; 1; 12	LAU; 2; 10	NOR; 1; 21	NOR; 2; 9	ZAN; 1; 21	ZAN; 2; 6	MSC; 1; 11	MSC; 2; 24†	NÜR; 1; 5	NÜR; 2; 14	HUN; 1; 13	HUN; 2; 5	HOC; 1; 7	HOC; 2; 4			10th	84
2017	BMW Team RMG	BMW M4 DTM	HOC; 1; 2	**HOC**; **2**; 8	LAU; 1; 11	LAU; 2; 15	HUN; 1; 2	HUN; 2; 7	NOR; 1; 5	NOR; 2; 10	MSC; 1; 5	MSC; 2; 13	**ZAN**; **1**; 1	ZAN; 2; 7	NÜR; 1; 12	NÜR; 2; 8	SPL; 1; 10	SPL; 2; 7	**HOC**; **1**; 3	HOC; 2; 12			7th	133
2018	BMW Team RMR	BMW M4 DTM	HOC; 1; 3	**HOC**; **2**; 1	LAU; 1; 2	LAU; 2; 5	HUN; 1; 14	HUN; 2; 2	NOR; 1; 10	NOR; 2; 10	ZAN; 1; 6	ZAN; 2; 10	BRH; 1; 13	BRH; 2; 11	MIS; 1; 7	MIS; 2; 15	NÜR; 1; 4	NÜR; 2; 16	SPL; 1 Ret	SPL; 2; 7	HOC; 1; 3	HOC; 2; 10	5th	144
2019	BMW Team RMR	BMW M4 Turbo DTM	HOC; 1; 4	HOC; 2; 6	ZOL; 1; 13	ZOL; 2; 14	MIS; 1; 10	MIS; 2 Ret	NOR; 1 Ret	NOR; 2; 9	ASS; 1; 5	ASS; 2; 14	BRH; 1; 13	BRH; 2; 12	LAU; 1 Ret	LAU; 2; 15†	NÜR; 1; 9	NÜR; 2; 9	HOC; 1; 6	HOC; 2; 4			12th	58
2020	BMW Team RMG	BMW M4 Turbo DTM	SPA; 1; 8	SPA; 2; 13	LAU; 1; 5	LAU; 2; 6	LAU; 1; 4	LAU; 2; 2	ASS; 1; 9	ASS; 2; 6	NÜR; 1; 7	NÜR; 2; 14	NÜR; 1; 10	NÜR; 2; 8	ZOL; 1; 4	**ZOL**; **2**; 4	ZOL; 1; 9	ZOL; 2; 4	HOC; 1; 14†	HOC; 2; 8			5th	120
2021	ROWE Racing	BMW M6 GT3	MNZ; 1; 16	MNZ; 2 Ret	LAU; 1; 11	LAU; 2; 13	ZOL; 1; 11	ZOL; 2; 17	NÜR; 1; 19	NÜR; 2; 7	RBR; 1; 10	RBR; 2; 10	ASS; 1 Ret	ASS; 2; 14	HOC; 1; 10	HOC; 2; 14	NOR; 1 Ret	NOR; 2; 11					17th	9
2022	Ceccato Motors	BMW M4 GT3	ALG; 1	ALG; 2	LAU; 1	LAU; 2	IMO; 1 Ret	IMO; 2; 11	NOR; 1	NOR; 2	NÜR; 1	NÜR; 2	SPA; 1	SPA; 2	RBR; 1	RBR; 2	HOC; 1	HOC; 2					NC‡	0‡
2025	Dörr Motorsport	McLaren 720S GT3 Evo	OSC; 1; 20	OSC; 2 Ret	LAU; 1; 17	LAU; 2; 10	ZAN; 1 Ret	ZAN; 2 DSQ	NOR; 1; 19	NOR; 2 Ret	NÜR; 1; 10	NÜR; 2 Ret	SAC; 1; 13	SAC; 2 Ret	RBR; 1; 22	RBR; 2; 14	HOC; 1 Ret	HOC; 2; 11					22nd	22
2026	Dörr Motorsport	McLaren 720S GT3 Evo	RBR; 1; 6	RBR; 2; 15	ZAN; 1 Ret	ZAN; 2; 14	LAU; 1 Ret	LAU; 2 Ret	NOR; 1 Ret	NOR; 2 Ret	OSC; 1; 8	OSC; 2; 16	NÜR; 1 Ret	NÜR; 2; 8	SAC; 1 Ret	SAC; 2; 15	HOC; 1 Ret	HOC; 2; 16					19th	30

^{†} Driver retired, but was classified as they completed 75% of the winner's race distance. ^{‡} Driver was a guest driver ineligible for points.

=== Complete Bathurst 12 Hour results ===
Year	Car#	Team	Co-Drivers	Car	Class	Laps	Pos.	Class Pos.
2017	7	(Germany) BMW Team SRM	(Australia) Russell Ingall (Australia) Tony Longhurst (Australia) Mark Skaife	BMW M6 GT3	APP	134	DNF	DNF
2018	100	(Germany) BMW Team SRM	(New Zealand) Steven Richards (Austria) Philipp Eng	BMW M6 GT3	APP	270	9th	6th

=== Complete IMSA SportsCar Championship results ===
(key) (Races in bold indicate pole position; races in italics indicate fastest lap)

Year	Entrant	Class	Make	Engine	1	2	3	4	5	6	7	8	9	10	11	Rank	Points
2021	BMW Team RLL	GTLM	BMW M8 GTE	BMW S63 4.0 L Turbo V8	DAY; 5	SEB	DET	WGL	WGL	LIM	ELK	LGA	LBH	VIR	PET	14th	286

=== Stock Car Brasil results ===
Year	Team	Car	1	2	3	4	5	6	7	8	9	10	11	12	13	14	15	16	17	18	19	20	21	22	23	Rank	Points
2022	Lubrax Podium	Chevrolet Cruze	INT; 1 DNS	GOI; 1	GOI; 2	VCA; 1	VCA; 2	RIO; 1	RIO; 2	BRA; 1	BRA; 2	BRA; 1	BRA; 2	INT; 1	INT; 2	SCZ; 1	SCZ; 2	VCA; 1	VCA; 2	GOI; 1	GOI; 2	GOI; 1	GOI; 2	BRA; 1	BRA; 2	NC†	0†

^{†} As Glock was a guest driver, he was ineligible to score points.

== Sources ==
- Formula One World Championship results are derived from "The Official Formula 1 website". Archived from the original on 19 February 2015.

Sporting positions
Preceded by Hannes Lachinger	Formula BMW ADAC; Champion; 2001	Succeeded by Nico Rosberg
Preceded by A. J. Allmendinger	Champ Car Rookie of the Year; 2005	Succeeded by Will Power
Preceded by Lewis Hamilton	GP2 Series; Champion; 2007	Succeeded by Giorgio Pantano
