= 2008 Belgian Grand Prix =

Coordinates: 50°26′14″N 5°58′17″E

Race 13 of 18 in the 2008 Formula One World Championship
← Previous race	Next race →
- Circuit de Spa-Francorchamps

Race details
- Date: 7 September 2008
- Official name: 2008 Formula 1 ING Belgian Grand Prix
- Location: Circuit de Spa-Francorchamps, Francorchamps, Wallonia, Belgium
- Course: Permanent racing facility
- Course length: 7.004 km (4.352 miles)
- Distance: 44 laps, 308.052 km (191.415 miles)
- Weather: Cloudy, rain in last 3 laps

Pole position
Driver	(United Kingdom) Lewis Hamilton	McLaren-Mercedes
- Time: 1:47.338

Fastest lap
Driver	(Finland) Kimi Räikkönen	Ferrari
- Time: 1:47.930 on lap 24

Podium
First	(Brazil) Felipe Massa	Ferrari
Second	(Germany) Nick Heidfeld	BMW Sauber
Third	(United Kingdom) Lewis Hamilton^{1}	McLaren-Mercedes
- Lap leaders: Lewis Hamilton penalised post-race, losing victory.

The 2008 Belgian Grand Prix (officially the 2008 Formula 1 ING Belgian Grand Prix) was a Formula One motor race held on 7 September 2008 at the Circuit de Spa-Francorchamps near the village of Francorchamps, Wallonia, Belgium. It was the 13th race of the 2008 Formula One World Championship. Felipe Massa for the Ferrari team won the 44-lap race, after the initial winner, McLaren driver Lewis Hamilton, was penalised for cutting a chicane and gaining an advantage over Ferrari's Kimi Räikkönen.

Hamilton started from pole position alongside title rival Massa. Hamilton's McLaren teammate Heikki Kovalainen started from third next to the 2007 winner Kimi Räikkönen. Following a spin by Hamilton on the second lap, Räikkönen led most of the race, until rain fell on lap 41 and Hamilton performed the penalised pass. Räikkönen crashed on the following lap as the rain became heavier. Massa finished second on the road after Hamilton, followed by Nick Heidfeld of BMW Sauber.

Hamilton received a 25-second penalty, which demoted him to third place and advanced Massa and Heidfeld to first and second positions. McLaren appealed the decision at the Fédération Internationale de l'Automobile (FIA) International Court of Appeal. Their case, however, was declared inadmissible, with the Court ruling that 25-second penalties cannot be challenged. The penalty prompted global press discussion, primarily from the United Kingdom and Italy, with several former drivers questioning the decision. Massa's retroactive victory, with Hamilton, demoted to third, narrowed the gap in the Championship from six points to just two.

== Background ==
Heading into the 13th race of the season, McLaren driver Lewis Hamilton was leading the Drivers' Championship with 70 points; Ferrari driver Felipe Massa was in second place with 64 points. With 57 points, Ferrari's Kimi Räikkönen was third, followed by Robert Kubica with 55 points. In the Constructors' Championship, Ferrari led 121 points to McLaren's 113.

Following the European Grand Prix on 24 August, mid-season testing took place at Italy's Autodromo Nazionale Monza. Ferrari concentrated on their aerodynamic set-up during tests on Monza's long straights. Massa set the quickest times on the first day, ahead of McLaren driver Heikki Kovalainen. BMW Sauber's Nick Heidfeld was quickest on the second day. Massa spun off into the gravel at the Ascari chicane, bringing a brief halt to testing. Hamilton was fastest on the third day. Kubica lost control of his car and drove off the track, limiting BMW's testing time as minor repairs were performed on the underside of his car.

== Practice ==
Three practice sessions were held before the Sunday race – two on Friday, and one on Saturday. The Friday morning and afternoon sessions each lasted 90 minutes; the third session, on Saturday morning, lasted for an hour. The first session was held on a dry track under cloudy skies; Massa was fastest with a time of 1:47.284, just quicker than his Ferrari teammate Räikkönen. The McLarens of Hamilton and Kovalainen, Alonso, Webber, Bourdais and Vettel completed the top eight. Light rain during the second session grew momentarily heavier halfway through, forcing the teams to switch to their wet set-ups. Hamilton led for most of the running, before Alonso, Massa and Kovalainen set faster times late in the session on a drying track. Räikkönen, Piquet, Coulthard, Bourdais and Webber all had off-track excursions with little damage done; a Fisichella spin at Stavelot forced the session to be halted for ten minutes while the debris was removed and water was cleared from the track. Conditions had not improved by the following morning for the start of the final period of practice, but a drying track late in the session allowed Heidfeld to record the best time, a 1:47.876, ahead of Kovalainen, Alonso, Hamilton, Massa, Vettel and Räikkönen.

== Qualifying ==
Saturday afternoon's qualifying session was divided into three parts. In the first 20-minute period, cars finishing 16th or lower were eliminated. The second qualifying period lasted for 15 minutes, at the end of which the fastest ten cars went into the final period, to determine their grid positions for the race. Cars failing to make the final period were allowed to be refuelled before the race but those competing in it were not, and so carried more fuel than they had done in the earlier qualifying sessions.

I did a great lap, but it was not enough to be on pole position. Today, we lacked a bit of speed compared to our main rivals but the race is very long and, over a distance, we know we can be very competitive and therefore we are capable of fighting for the win ... Then, we will have to see what the various strategy choices are and obviously, how the weather evolves. If it was to rain, the race could be turned into a lottery.

— Felipe Massa, following the third qualifying session.

Hamilton clinched his fifth pole position of the season with a time of 1:47.338, ahead of Felipe Massa, who qualified second 0.34 seconds behind his McLaren rival. A mistake-free run allowed Kovalainen to take third place on the grid, alongside Räikkönen in fourth. Heidfeld took fifth, ahead of Alonso, Webber and Kubica. Bourdais – after setting the quickest time in the first session – took ninth, one place ahead of his Toro Rosso teammate Vettel. Toyota driver Jarno Trulli qualified 11th after he experienced problems generating heat into his tyres; his teammate Timo Glock experienced similar problems and lined up from 13th behind Piquet. Coulthard and Rosberg took the next two grid spots, ahead of the Honda pair of Rubens Barrichello and Jenson Button, who both believed they had maximised the performance of their cars. Force India driver Adrian Sutil, Williams driver Kazuki Nakajima and Fisichella took the final three positions.

=== Qualifying classification ===
Pos	No	Driver	Constructor	Part 1	Part 2	Part 3	Grid
1	22	(United Kingdom) Lewis Hamilton	McLaren-Mercedes	1:46.887	1:46.088	1:47.338	1
2	2	(Brazil) Felipe Massa	Ferrari	1:46.873	1:46.391	1:47.678	2
3	23	(Finland) Heikki Kovalainen	McLaren-Mercedes	1:46.812	1:46.037	1:47.815	3
4	1	(Finland) Kimi Räikkönen	Ferrari	1:46.960	1:46.298	1:47.992	4
5	3	(Germany) Nick Heidfeld	BMW Sauber	1:47.419	1:46.311	1:48.315	5
6	5	(Spain) Fernando Alonso	Renault	1:47.154	1:46.491	1:48.504	6
7	10	(Australia) Mark Webber	Red Bull-Renault	1:47.270	1:46.814	1:48.736	7
8	4	(Poland) Robert Kubica	BMW Sauber	1:47.093	1:46.494	1:48.763	8
9	14	(France) Sébastien Bourdais	Toro Rosso-Ferrari	1:46.777	1:46.544	1:48.951	9
10	15	(Germany) Sebastian Vettel	Toro Rosso-Ferrari	1:47.152	1:46.804	1:50.319	10
11	11	(Italy) Jarno Trulli	Toyota	1:47.400	1:46.949		11
12	6	(Brazil) Nelson Piquet Jr.	Renault	1:47.052	1:46.965		12
13	12	(Germany) Timo Glock	Toyota	1:47.359	1:46.995		13
14	9	(United Kingdom) David Coulthard	Red Bull-Renault	1:47.132	1:47.018		14
15	7	(Germany) Nico Rosberg	Williams-Toyota	1:47.503	1:47.429		15
16	17	(Brazil) Rubens Barrichello	Honda	1:48.153			16
17	16	(United Kingdom) Jenson Button	Honda	1:48.211			17
18	20	(Germany) Adrian Sutil	Force India-Ferrari	1:48.226			18
19	8	(Japan) Kazuki Nakajima	Williams-Toyota	1:48.268			19
20	21	(Italy) Giancarlo Fisichella	Force India-Ferrari	1:48.447			20

== Race ==
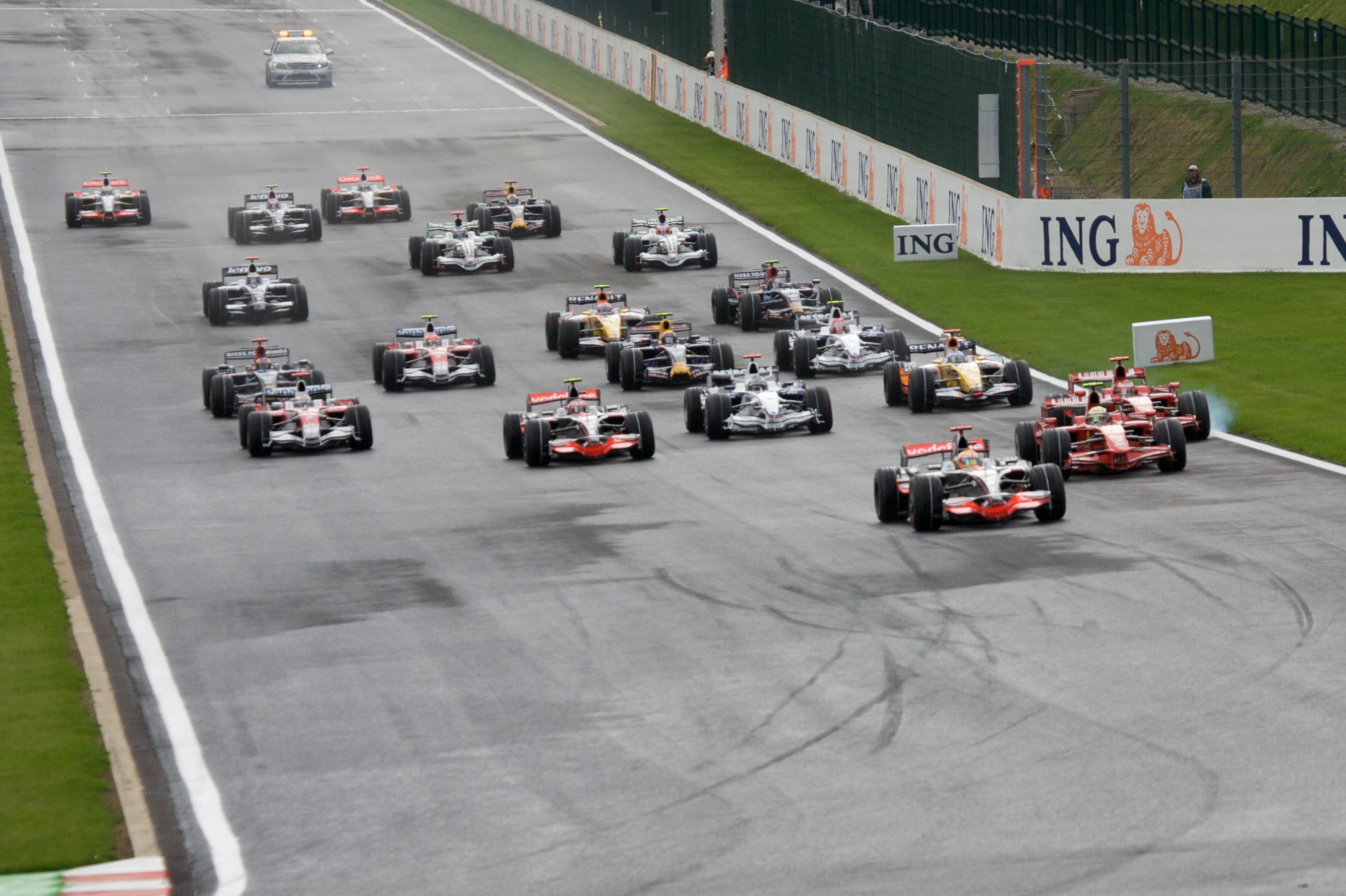
The start of the race, with Lewis Hamilton maintaining his pole position advantage into La Source

Nelson Piquet was the only driver not to start with the softer compound dry-weather tyres on a track which was still drying from morning rain, with the Brazilian opting for the harder tyre available. There was a strong chance of showers predicted during the race. Several cars were slow away on the slippery track, most notably Kovalainen. The main beneficiaries off the line were Piquet and Trulli, who each gained five places. Trulli was hit from behind at the first corner by Bourdais, who also had a quick start. The Toyota suffered diffuser and gearbox damage from the incident, spinning later in the lap. Kovalainen and Heidfeld also collided at the start. This allowed Alonso to gain several places. Sebastian Vettel locked his brakes and ran wide, losing two places. Fisichella collided with Nakajima on the first lap and had to pit to fix a broken front wing and punctures. Hamilton led from Räikkönen who managed to pass his Ferrari teammate Felipe Massa on the Kemmel straight.

On the second lap, Hamilton spun at La Source and lost his lead to Räikkönen on the next straight. Glock lost several places over the first few laps due to a lack of grip from his tyres. On lap ten, Heikki Kovalainen attempted to pass Webber at the Bus Stop chicane, but hit Webber on the side, causing the Australian to spin. Although the McLaren driver later dismissed the contact as "a racing accident", he was given a drive-through penalty, which he took on lap 14, dropping him to 15th place.

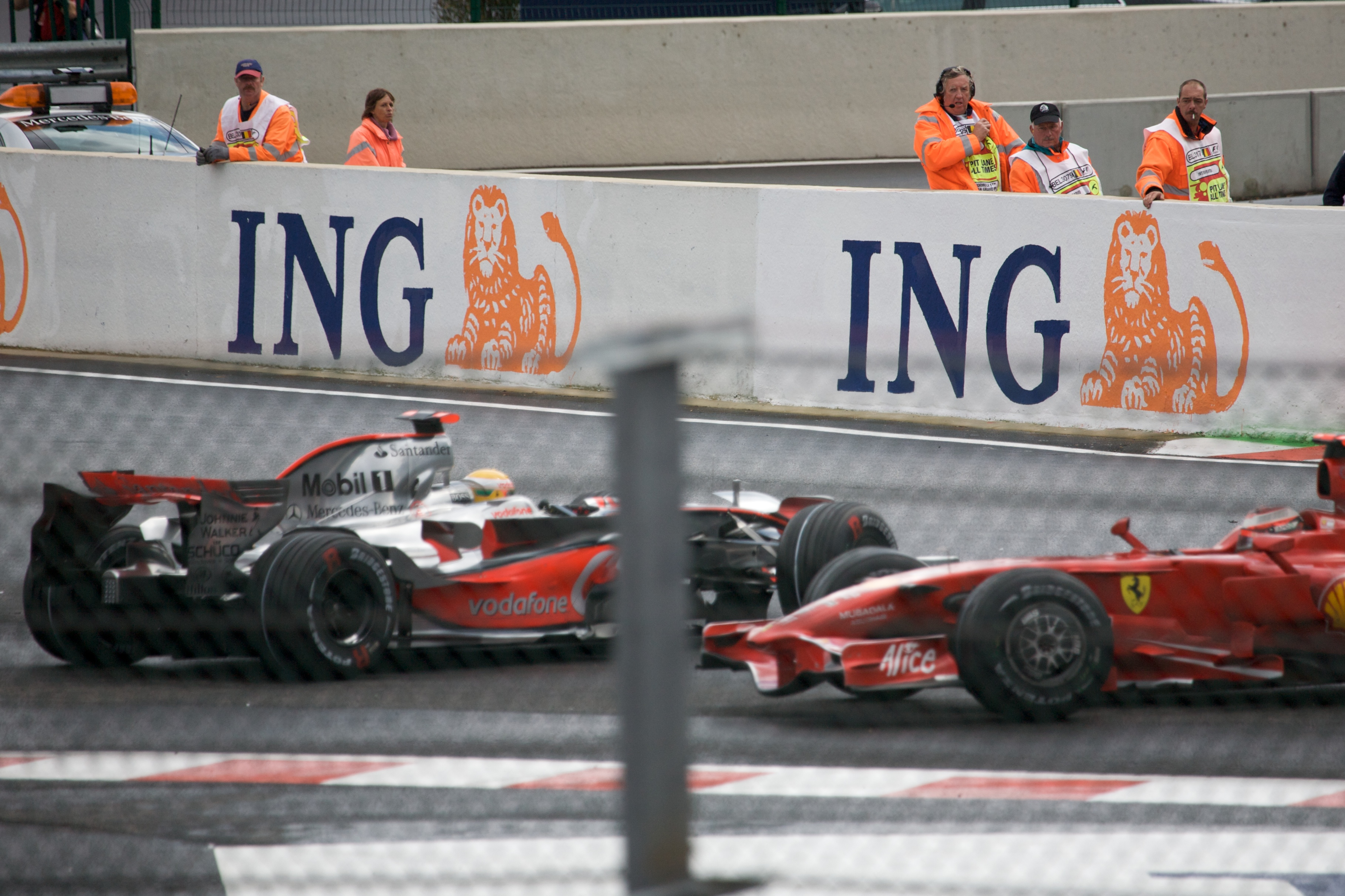
Hamilton spins on the second lap of the race, allowing Kimi Räikkönen to pass him for the lead.

By the ten-lap mark, Räikkönen had opened a three-second lead over Hamilton. Hamilton was the first of the leaders to pit, on lap 11, followed by Räikkönen a lap later. Massa and Alonso pitted on lap 13, with Heidfeld a lap after them. Heidfeld's BMW teammate Robert Kubica pitted on lap 15, along with Bourdais. Räikkönen maintained his lead over Hamilton after the round of pit stops, followed by Massa, Alonso and Bourdais.

Piquet retired on lap 13, after spinning off and colliding with a wall. Following the race, the Renault driver blamed damp patches on the track for the incident, adding that "It's a shame because I'm sure we could have done something today." On lap 17, Rubens Barrichello retired with a gearbox problem, suffering from a failing sixth gear and engine over-revving.

The first nine runners continued in the same order until Räikkönen and Hamilton both took their second pit stops on lap 25, with Alonso pitting on lap 27, Massa on lap 28, and Heidfeld on lap 31. Bourdais and Kubica pitted on laps 32 and 33, respectively.

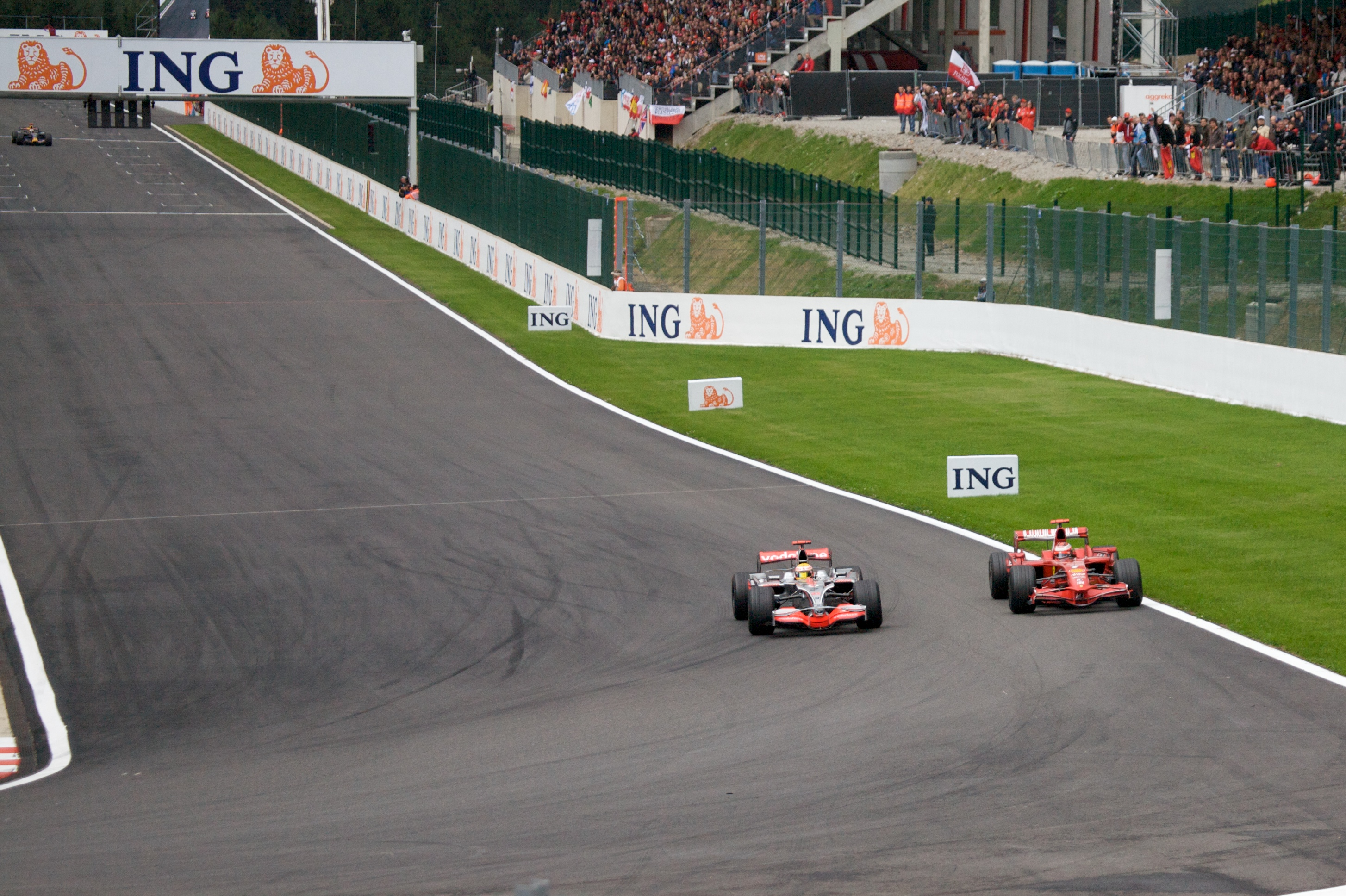
Hamilton passes Räikkönen in the closing stages, having let him back past after cutting the previous corner.

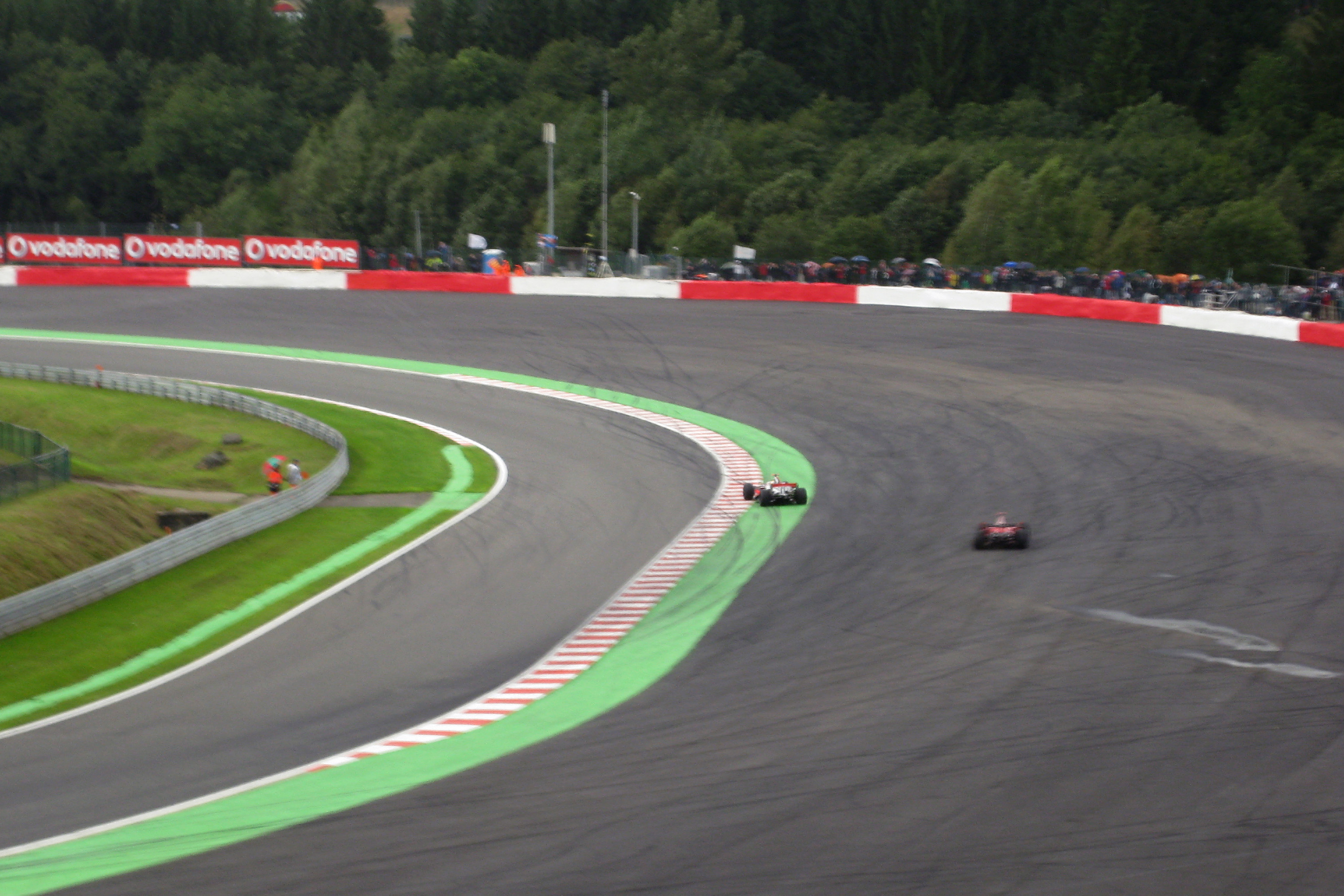
Both drivers go off at Pouhon as rain falls down.

Following the second round of pit stops, Räikkönen was five seconds ahead of Hamilton, but Hamilton began to close in on Räikkönen during the last stint as a result of the tyres better suiting his McLaren Mercedes. Heavy rain began to fall on lap 41. Hamilton closed the gap on Räikkönen to under a second, still six seconds ahead of Massa. Hamilton attempted to pass Räikkönen at the Bus Stop chicane, but was forced off and had to cut across the chicane to avoid a collision. Consequently, Hamilton led out of the chicane but allowed Räikkönen to re-pass him halfway down the straight. Hamilton then passed him again at the La Source hairpin under braking. Räikkönen tried to double-back on Hamilton to regain the position but the line was defended, resulting in Räikkönen touching his front wing on Hamilton's rear tyre. The rain started coming down more heavily and Nico Rosberg spun at Fagnes corner, rejoining in front of the two frontrunners and causing Hamilton to run onto the grass. At the next corner, Räikkönen spun and gave the lead back to Hamilton. Räikkönen then lost control of his Ferrari through the Blanchimont corner and collided with the barrier, ending his race.

Hamilton was first to finish the race, having cautiously driven his car to the line in very wet conditions, followed by Massa and Heidfeld. Heidfeld rose from ninth position during the final laps due to the superior grip of the intermediate tyres put on during a pit stop two laps prior to the end of the race. Fernando Alonso and Timo Glock similarly benefited from intermediate tyres, Alonso finishing fourth and Glock eighth, having passed Webber on the final corner. Conversely, Toro Rosso drivers Bourdais and Vettel, who were third and fourth with one lap to go, were pushed down to seventh and fifth positions due to the lack of grip of their dry-weather tyres.

=== Post-race ===
Timo Glock was handed a 25-second penalty for overtaking Mark Webber under yellow flags during the final lap of the race. The penalty pushed Glock from eighth to ninth place.

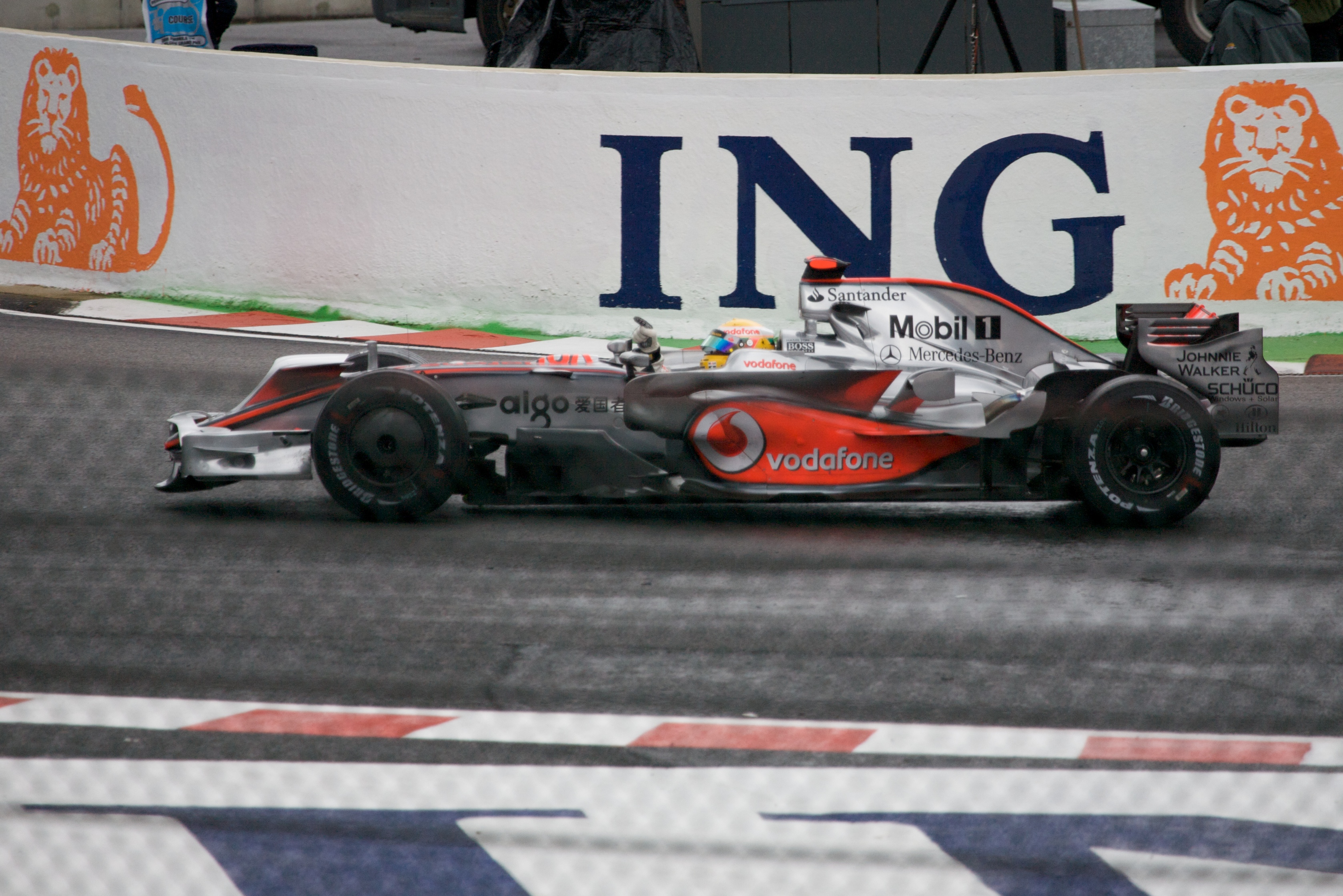
Hamilton celebrates his on-track victory. It was to be short-lived.

Hamilton appeared on the podium and subsequent press conference in the winner's position. When questioned on the incident at the press conference, Hamilton defended his actions:

[Räikkönen] pushed me to the point where I would either have been on the kerb and crashed into him or have to go on the escape route, so I went on the escape route. I understood I had to let him past, so I did. I got in his tow and he was ducking and diving left and right and I did the same and managed to get back to the inside of him. But then he hit me at the apex of the corner but I think I was pretty much gone from there.

— Lewis Hamilton,

Two hours after the race, the FIA stewards for the race issued a statement announcing that Hamilton was guilty of contravening Article 30.3 (a) of the 2008 FIA Formula One Sporting Regulations and Appendix L, Chapter 4, Article 2 (g) of the International Sporting Code, which both state that cutting a chicane and gaining an advantage is subject to a drive-through penalty. As the race had finished, a 25-second penalty was added to Hamilton's time instead. As a result of this penalty, Massa was promoted to winner of the Grand Prix, and Hamilton was dropped down to third position.

On 9 September, McLaren lodged an official complaint with the FIA about the incident. In the appeal hearing on 22 September, McLaren alleged that they had twice been advised by race director Charlie Whiting that Hamilton had correctly returned the position to Räikkönen. Furthermore, they presented telemetry evidence suggesting that Hamilton had not only crossed the finish line after Räikkönen, but that he was travelling 6.7 km/h (4.2 mph) slower at the time. McLaren's lawyer Mark Phillips QC attempted to convince the court that since the penalty was in the form of time added on, the case was valid. They presented the previous case of Vitantonio Liuzzi at the 2007 Japanese Grand Prix, specifically the FIA's claim that the presiding chief steward at the race, Tony Scott Andrews, had admitted fault in awarding the penalty to Liuzzi. Andrews denied the FIA's allegation. McLaren went on to use the case as a precedent for the Spa incident. The Court stated that this analogy was invalid, since in Liuzzi's case the admissibility of his appeal was not contested.

On 23 September, the Court of Appeal issued its decision, ruling that the appeal was inadmissible.

== Reaction ==
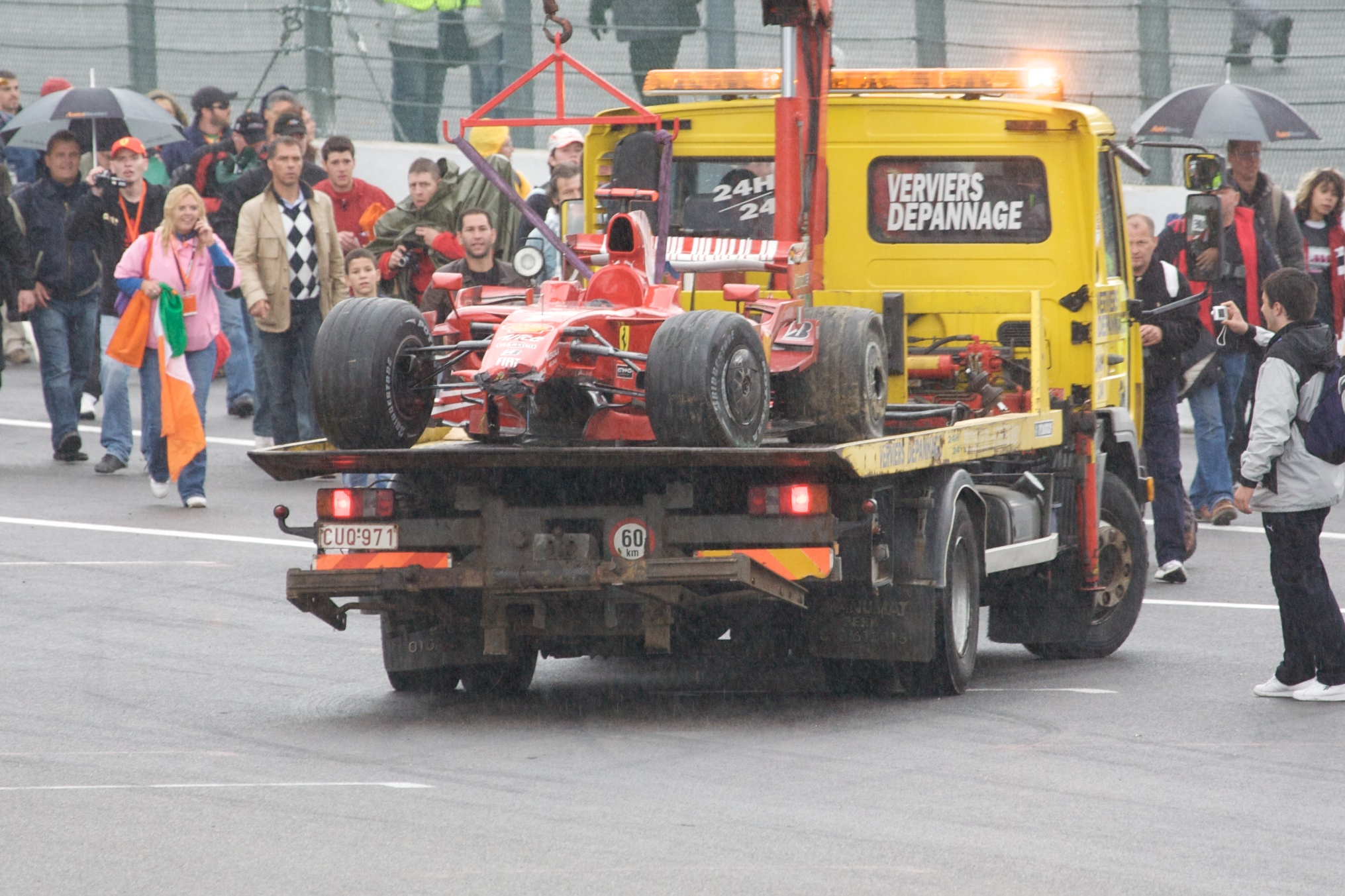
Räikkönen's damaged Ferrari F2008 is brought back to the pits after the Finn crashed with two laps to go.

From the position where [Hamilton] was, because he cut the chicane, he was [able to pass into turn one]. But if he had would have been behind me through the chicane then it may have been a different story.

— Kimi Räikkönen

Some Formula One drivers focussed more on Hamilton gaining an advantage, rather than a penalty of 25 seconds over-punishing him for the fact that Räikkönen later crashed out having already re-passed Hamilton. Sébastien Bourdais of Toro Rosso said that "the penalty is really rough but in the end it's up to you to give the position back (which he did) or not. Pretty straightforward". The view was reiterated by his fellow drivers Nico Rosberg and Jarno Trulli. Trulli believed that "Hamilton got an advantage by cutting the chicane", saying, "Had he stayed on the road, he wouldn't have had the speed to overtake the Ferrari. In the same way at Monza someone could cut the first chicane, catch a rival's draft, and overtake him under braking at Roggia".

Former world champion Niki Lauda said that he did "not understand this completely wrong decision", adding "It's unbelievable how the best driver in yesterday's race makes no mistakes and only gets six points". He called for the formation of permanent race stewards, instead of the temporary steward system currently in place. He called it "the worst judgement in the history of F1", saying, "It's absolutely unacceptable when three [stewards] influence the championship like this". Three-time world champion Jackie Stewart said that "F1 attracts the largest capital investment in sport, but it's being overseen by people who are not doing it full-time and we get inconsistent decisions".

The original penalty received mixed reactions in the world press. Byron Young in Britain's Daily Mirror said that it was the stewards' decision "that mars sport and turns fans away, that ruins the efforts of even the best competitors, taints the day and leaves fans wondering what exactly they are 'fans' of". The Finnish daily newspaper Helsingin Sanomat noted that though the Grand Prix had "crushed" Räikkönen's championship dreams, Hamilton had adhered "with the rules of racing" in giving the position back. The newspaper put Räikkönen's disappointment down to his crash, rather than the chicane incident. In Italy, La Gazzetta dello Sport declared that the decision was justified, stating that Hamilton "should have waited at least another turn rather than attacking so soon".

The incident and subsequent court hearing led to a clarification by the FIA, saying that drivers must wait one further corner after cutting a chicane before attempting another overtaking manoeuvre. Formula One driver and a director of the Grand Prix Drivers' Association Mark Webber said that the clarification had made the issue much clearer:

Lewis would probably never ever have had a crack at Kimi around the outside at the first part of the Bus Stop without knowing he had the option of going onto the asphalt part. I think we've got to get on top of the chicanes going forward, and we're not too far away from that at the moment, where drivers know that if you gain a position or gain an advantage, you have to give it back a bit more.

— Mark Webber,

=== Race classification ===
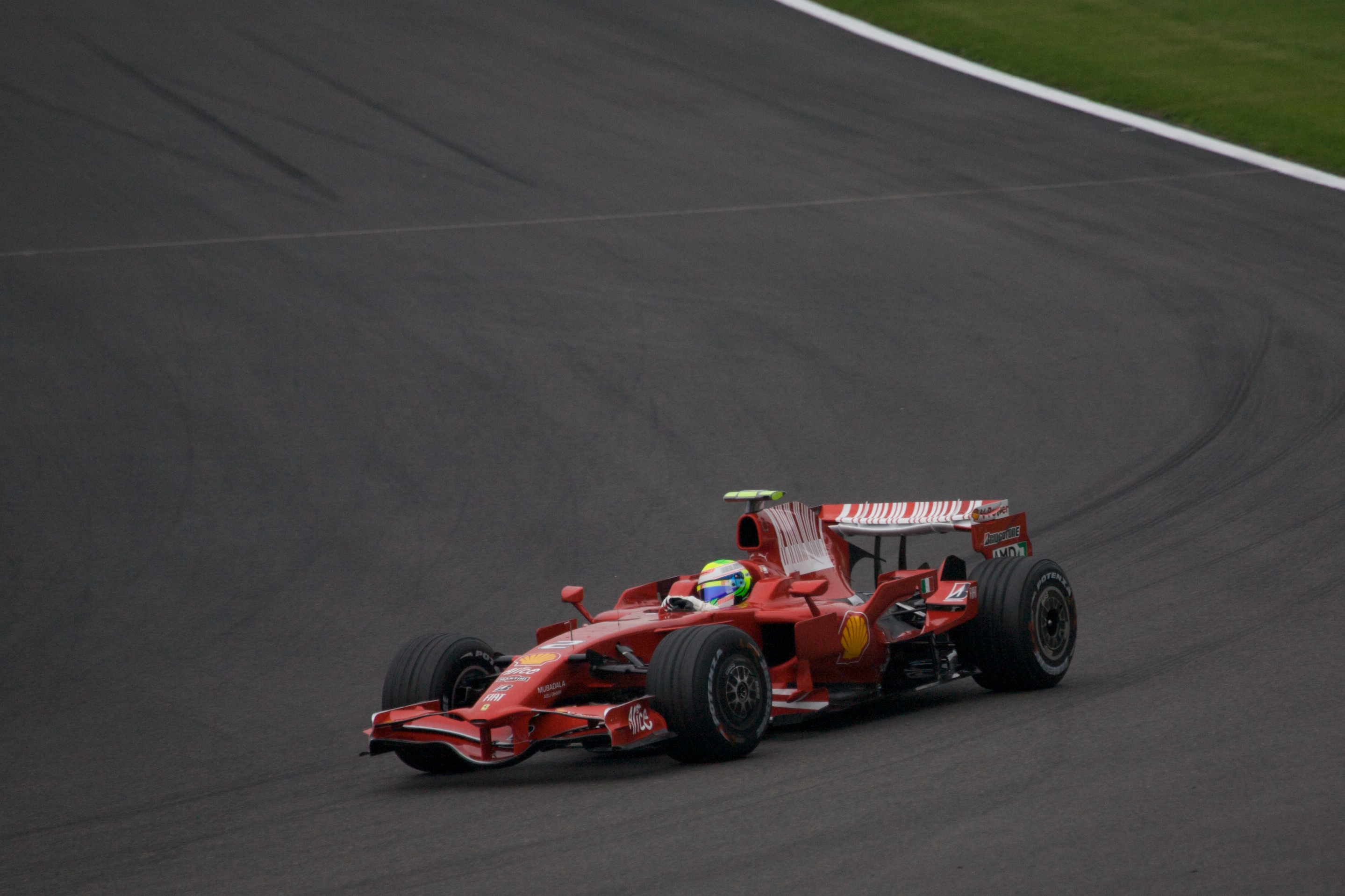
Felipe Massa inherited the race victory after Hamilton's penalty.

Pos	No	Driver	Constructor	Laps	Time/Retired	Grid	Points
1	2	(Brazil) Felipe Massa	Ferrari	44	1:22:59.394	2	10
2	3	(Germany) Nick Heidfeld	BMW Sauber	44	+9.383	5	8
3	22	(United Kingdom) Lewis Hamilton	McLaren-Mercedes	44	+10.539^{1}	1	6
4	5	(Spain) Fernando Alonso	Renault	44	+14.478	6	5
5	15	(Germany) Sebastian Vettel	Toro Rosso-Ferrari	44	+14.576	10	4
6	4	(Poland) Robert Kubica	BMW Sauber	44	+15.037	8	3
7	14	(France) Sébastien Bourdais	Toro Rosso-Ferrari	44	+16.735	9	2
8	10	(Australia) Mark Webber	Red Bull-Renault	44	+42.776	7	1
9	12	(Germany) Timo Glock	Toyota	44	+1:07.045^{2}	13	
10^{3}	23	(Finland) Heikki Kovalainen	McLaren-Mercedes	43	Gearbox	3	
11	9	(United Kingdom) David Coulthard	Red Bull-Renault	43	+1 Lap	14	
12	7	(Germany) Nico Rosberg	Williams-Toyota	43	+1 Lap	15	
13	20	(Germany) Adrian Sutil	Force India-Ferrari	43	+1 Lap	18	
14	8	(Japan) Kazuki Nakajima	Williams-Toyota	43	+1 Lap	19	
15	16	(United Kingdom) Jenson Button	Honda	43	+1 Lap	17	
16	11	(Italy) Jarno Trulli	Toyota	43	+1 Lap	11	
17	21	(Italy) Giancarlo Fisichella	Force India-Ferrari	43	+1 Lap	20	
18^{3}	1	(Finland) Kimi Räikkönen	Ferrari	42	Accident/Spun off	4	
Ret	17	(Brazil) Rubens Barrichello	Honda	19	Gearbox	16	
Ret	6	(Brazil) Nelson Piquet Jr.	Renault	13	Accident	12	

Notes

- ^1 – Lewis Hamilton finished first, but was given a 25-second penalty for cutting a chicane and gaining an advantage after giving back the position in an inconvenient manner.
- ^2 – Timo Glock finished eighth, but was given a 25-second penalty for overtaking Mark Webber under yellow flags.
- ^3 – Heikki Kovalainen and Kimi Räikkönen were classified because they completed over 90% of the race distance.

== Championship standings after the race ==
Drivers' Championship standings

	Pos.	Driver	Points
	1	(United Kingdom) Lewis Hamilton*	76
	2	(Brazil) Felipe Massa*	74
1	3	(Poland) Robert Kubica*	58
1	4	(Finland) Kimi Räikkönen*	57
1	5	(Germany) Nick Heidfeld*	49

Constructors' Championship standings

Pos.	Constructor	Points
1	(Italy) Ferrari*	131
2	(United Kingdom) McLaren-Mercedes*	119
3	(Germany) BMW Sauber*	107
4	(Japan) Toyota	41
5	(France) Renault	36

- Note: Only the top five positions are included for both sets of standings.
- Bold text and an asterisk indicates competitors who still had a theoretical chance of becoming World Champion.

== See also ==
- 2008 Spa-Francorchamps GP2 Series round

== Notes ==
Previous race: 2008 European Grand Prix	FIA Formula One World Championship; 2008 season	Next race: 2008 Italian Grand Prix
Previous race: 2007 Belgian Grand Prix	Belgian Grand Prix	Next race: 2009 Belgian Grand Prix
