= 2019 Lausitzring DTM round =

(Germany) 2019 DTM Lausitz round
Event Information
- Round 7 of 9 in the 2019 Deutsche Tourenwagen Masters
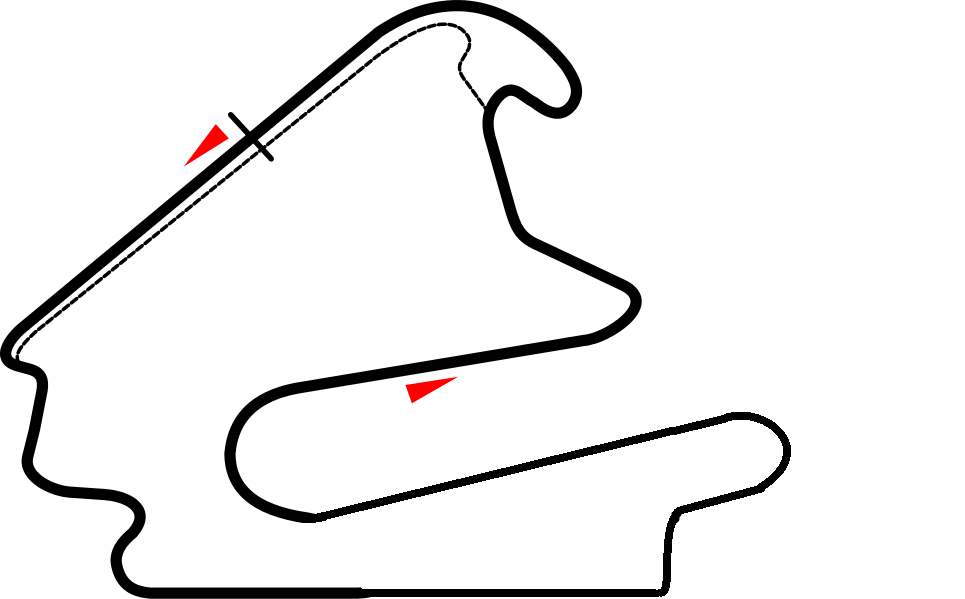
- Date: 24–25 August 2019 Deutsche Tourenwagen Masters
- Location: Klettwitz, Germany
- Venue: Lausitzring
- Weather: Saturday: Fine; Sunday: Fine

Results
Race 1
Distance	34 laps	147.730 km
Pole position	(Germany) René Rast; Audi Sport Team Rosberg	1:35.241
Winner	(Switzerland) Nico Müller; Audi Sport Team Abt	56:53.891
Race 2
Distance	34 laps	147.730 km
Pole position	(United Kingdom) Jamie Green; Audi Sport Team Rosberg	1:35.397
Winner	(Germany) René Rast; Audi Sport Team Rosberg	56:59.382

The 2019 DTM Lausitz round was a motor racing event for the Deutsche Tourenwagen Masters (DTM) held between 24 and 25 August 2019. The event, part of the 33rd season of the DTM, was held at the Lausitzring in Germany.

Race 2 of the weekend marked the 500th race in the history of the DTM. Audi secured the manufacturers' championship with two events remaining.

== Results ==
=== Race 1 ===
==== Qualifying ====
Pos.	No.	Driver	Team	Car	Time	Gap	Grid	Pts
1	33	(Germany) René Rast	Audi Sport Team Rosberg	Audi RS5 Turbo DTM	1:35.241		1	3
2	53	(United Kingdom) Jamie Green	Audi Sport Team Rosberg	Audi RS5 Turbo DTM	1:35.286	+0.045	2	2
3	51	(Switzerland) Nico Müller	Audi Sport Team Abt	Audi RS5 Turbo DTM	1:35.438	+0.197	3	1
4	4	(Netherlands) Robin Frijns	Audi Sport Team Abt	Audi RS5 Turbo DTM	1:35.537	+0.296	4	
5	11	(Germany) Marco Wittmann	BMW Team RMG	BMW M4 Turbo DTM	1:35.581	+0.340	5	
6	99	(Germany) Mike Rockenfeller	Audi Sport Team Phoenix	Audi RS5 Turbo DTM	1:35.595	+0.354	6	
7	21	(Brazil) Pietro Fittipaldi	Audi Sport Team WRT	Audi RS5 Turbo DTM	1:35.736	+0.495	7	
8	25	(Austria) Philipp Eng	BMW Team RMR	BMW M4 Turbo DTM	1:35.760	+0.519	8	
9	16	(Germany) Timo Glock	BMW Team RMR	BMW M4 Turbo DTM	1:35.926	+0.685	9	
10	47	(Sweden) Joel Eriksson	BMW Team RBM	BMW M4 Turbo DTM	1:35.970	+0.729	10	
11	28	(France) Loïc Duval	Audi Sport Team Phoenix	Audi RS5 Turbo DTM	1:36.001	+0.760	11	
12	7	(Canada) Bruno Spengler	BMW Team RMG	BMW M4 Turbo DTM	1:36.052	+0.811	12	
13	76	(United Kingdom) Jake Dennis	R-Motorsport	Aston Martin Vantage DTM	1:36.134	+0.893	13	
14	31	(South Africa) Sheldon van der Linde	BMW Team RBM	BMW M4 Turbo DTM	1:36.198	+0.957	14	
15	3	(United Kingdom) Paul di Resta	R-Motorsport	Aston Martin Vantage DTM	1:36.524	+1.283	15	
NC	23	(Spain) Daniel Juncadella	R-Motorsport	Aston Martin Vantage DTM	No time		16	
NC	27	(South Africa) Jonathan Aberdein	Audi Sport Team WRT	Audi RS5 Turbo DTM	No time		17	
NC	62	(Austria) Ferdinand von Habsburg	R-Motorsport	Aston Martin Vantage DTM	No time		18	

==== Race ====
Pos	No.	Driver	Team	Car	Laps	Time / Retired	Grid	Pts
1	51	(Switzerland) Nico Müller	Audi Sport Team Abt	Audi RS5 Turbo DTM	34	56:53.891	3	25
2	4	(Netherlands) Robin Frijns	Audi Sport Team Abt	Audi RS5 Turbo DTM	34	+2.496	4	18
3	99	(Germany) Mike Rockenfeller	Audi Sport Team Phoenix	Audi RS5 Turbo DTM	34	+3.206	6	15
4	11	(Germany) Marco Wittmann	BMW Team RMG	BMW M4 Turbo DTM	34	+5.807	5	12
5	25	(Austria) Philipp Eng	BMW Team RMR	BMW M4 Turbo DTM	34	+13.477	8	10
6	28	(France) Loïc Duval	Audi Sport Team Phoenix	Audi RS5 Turbo DTM	34	+14.742	11	8
7	21	(Brazil) Pietro Fittipaldi	Audi Sport Team WRT	Audi RS5 Turbo DTM	34	+16.859	7	6
8	47	(Sweden) Joel Eriksson	BMW Team RBM	BMW M4 Turbo DTM	34	+17.532	10	4
9	7	(Canada) Bruno Spengler	BMW Team RMG	BMW M4 Turbo DTM	34	+21.472	12	2
10	53	(United Kingdom) Jamie Green	Audi Sport Team Rosberg	Audi RS5 Turbo DTM	34	+24.318	2	1
11	76	(United Kingdom) Jake Dennis	R-Motorsport	Aston Martin Vantage DTM	34	+34.098	13	
12	23	(Spain) Daniel Juncadella	R-Motorsport	Aston Martin Vantage DTM	34	+34.511	16	
13	3	(United Kingdom) Paul di Resta	R-Motorsport	Aston Martin Vantage DTM	34	+43.357	15	
14	27	(South Africa) Jonathan Aberdein	Audi Sport Team WRT	Audi RS5 Turbo DTM	34	+45.084	17	
15	62	(Austria) Ferdinand von Habsburg	R-Motorsport	Aston Martin Vantage DTM	34	+51.948	18	
16	31	(South Africa) Sheldon van der Linde	BMW Team RBM	BMW M4 Turbo DTM	34	+1:01.608	14	
Ret	16	(Germany) Timo Glock	BMW Team RMR	BMW M4 Turbo DTM	17	Mechanical	9	
Ret	33	(Germany) René Rast	Audi Sport Team Rosberg	Audi RS5 Turbo DTM	8	Mechanical	1	
Fastest lap set by Robin Frijns: 1:38.176

=== Race 2 ===
==== Qualifying ====
Pos.	No.	Driver	Team	Car	Time	Gap	Grid	Pts
1	53	(United Kingdom) Jamie Green	Audi Sport Team Rosberg	Audi RS5 Turbo DTM	1:35.397		1	3
2	27	(South Africa) Jonathan Aberdein	Audi Sport Team WRT	Audi RS5 Turbo DTM	1:35.498	+0.101	2	2
3	51	(Switzerland) Nico Müller	Audi Sport Team Abt	Audi RS5 Turbo DTM	1:35.548	+0.151	3	1
4	33	(Germany) René Rast	Audi Sport Team Rosberg	Audi RS5 Turbo DTM	1:35.609	+0.212	4	
5	4	(Netherlands) Robin Frijns	Audi Sport Team Abt	Audi RS5 Turbo DTM	1:35.628	+0.231	5	
6	11	(Germany) Marco Wittmann	BMW Team RMG	BMW M4 Turbo DTM	1:35.647	+0.250	6	
7	28	(France) Loïc Duval	Audi Sport Team Phoenix	Audi RS5 Turbo DTM	1:35.677	+0.280	7	
8	21	(Brazil) Pietro Fittipaldi	Audi Sport Team WRT	Audi RS5 Turbo DTM	1:35.747	+0.350	8	
9	16	(Germany) Timo Glock	BMW Team RMR	BMW M4 Turbo DTM	1:35.843	+0.446	9	
10	99	(Germany) Mike Rockenfeller	Audi Sport Team Phoenix	Audi RS5 Turbo DTM	1:35.891	+0.494	10	
11	31	(South Africa) Sheldon van der Linde	BMW Team RBM	BMW M4 Turbo DTM	1:35.907	+0.510	11	
12	47	(Sweden) Joel Eriksson	BMW Team RBM	BMW M4 Turbo DTM	1:36.035	+0.638	12	
13	7	(Canada) Bruno Spengler	BMW Team RMG	BMW M4 Turbo DTM	1:36.327	+0.930	13	
14	3	(United Kingdom) Paul di Resta	R-Motorsport	Aston Martin Vantage DTM	1:36.555	+1.158	14	
15	76	(United Kingdom) Jake Dennis	R-Motorsport	Aston Martin Vantage DTM	1:36.667	+1.270	15	
16	62	(Austria) Ferdinand von Habsburg	R-Motorsport	Aston Martin Vantage DTM	1:37.112	+1.715	16	
17	23	(Spain) Daniel Juncadella	R-Motorsport	Aston Martin Vantage DTM	1:37.130	+1.733	17	
NC	25	(Austria) Philipp Eng	BMW Team RMR	BMW M4 Turbo DTM	No time		18	

==== Race ====
Pos	No.	Driver	Team	Car	Laps	Time / Retired	Grid	Pts
1	33	(Germany) René Rast	Audi Sport Team Rosberg	Audi RS5 Turbo DTM	34	56:59.382	4	25
2	51	(Switzerland) Nico Müller	Audi Sport Team Abt	Audi RS5 Turbo DTM	34	+5.187	3	18
3	99	(Germany) Mike Rockenfeller	Audi Sport Team Phoenix	Audi RS5 Turbo DTM	34	+8.953	10	15
4	53	(United Kingdom) Jamie Green	Audi Sport Team Rosberg	Audi RS5 Turbo DTM	34	+9.618	1	12
5	4	(Netherlands) Robin Frijns	Audi Sport Team Abt	Audi RS5 Turbo DTM	34	+11.341	5	10
6	11	(Germany) Marco Wittmann	BMW Team RMG	BMW M4 Turbo DTM	34	+12.982	6	8
7	27	(South Africa) Jonathan Aberdein	Audi Sport Team WRT	Audi RS5 Turbo DTM	34	+13.752	2	6
8	28	(France) Loïc Duval	Audi Sport Team Phoenix	Audi RS5 Turbo DTM	34	+14.071	7	4
9	21	(Brazil) Pietro Fittipaldi	Audi Sport Team WRT	Audi RS5 Turbo DTM	34	+21.130	8	2
10	25	(Austria) Philipp Eng	BMW Team RMR	BMW M4 Turbo DTM	34	+23.105	18	1
11	31	(South Africa) Sheldon van der Linde	BMW Team RBM	BMW M4 Turbo DTM	34	+23.568	11	
12	23	(Spain) Daniel Juncadella	R-Motorsport	Aston Martin Vantage DTM	34	+24.077	17	
13	47	(Sweden) Joel Eriksson	BMW Team RBM	BMW M4 Turbo DTM	34	+43.396	12	
14	7	(Canada) Bruno Spengler	BMW Team RMG	BMW M4 Turbo DTM	34	+54.611	13	
15	16	(Germany) Timo Glock	BMW Team RMR	BMW M4 Turbo DTM	25	+9 laps	9	
Ret	3	(United Kingdom) Paul di Resta	R-Motorsport	Aston Martin Vantage DTM	20	Crash damage	14	
Ret	62	(Austria) Ferdinand von Habsburg	R-Motorsport	Aston Martin Vantage DTM	8	Mechanical	16	
Ret	76	(United Kingdom) Jake Dennis	R-Motorsport	Aston Martin Vantage DTM	2	Mechanical	15	
Fastest lap set by Philipp Eng: 1:37.897

== Championship standings ==
Drivers Championship

Pos	Driver	Pts	Gap
1	(Germany) René Rast	234	
2	(Switzerland) Nico Müller	214	-20
3	(Germany) Marco Wittmann	167	-67
4	(Austria) Philipp Eng	140	-94
5	(Germany) Mike Rockenfeller	138	-96

Teams Championship

	Pos	Team	Pts	Gap
1	1	(Germany) Audi Sport Team Abt (4, 51)	335	
1	2	(Germany) Audi Sport Team Rosberg (33, 53)	310	-25
	3	(Germany) BMW Team RMG (7, 11)	246	-89
	4	(Germany) Audi Sport Team Phoenix (28, 99)	239	-96
	5	(Belgium) BMW Team RMR (16, 25)	173	-162

Manufacturers Championship

Pos	Drivers	Pts	Gap
1	(Germany) Audi	872	
2	(Germany) BMW	463	-409
3	(United Kingdom) Aston Martin	44	-828

- Note: Only the top five positions are included for three sets of standings.

Previous race: 2019 Brands Hatch DTM round	Deutsche Tourenwagen Masters; 2019 season	Next race: 2019 Nürburgring DTM round
