= 2019 Misano DTM round =

(Italy) 2019 DTM Misano round
Event Information
- Round 3 of 9 in the 2019 Deutsche Tourenwagen Masters
- Date: 8–9 June 2019 Deutsche Tourenwagen Masters
- Location: Misano Adriatico, Italy
- Venue: Misano World Circuit Marco Simoncelli
- Weather: Saturday: Sunny; Sunday: Sunny

Results
Race 1
Distance	39 laps	164.814 km
Pole position	(Germany) René Rast; Audi Sport Team Rosberg	1:25.294
Winner	(Germany) Marco Wittmann; BMW Team RMG	1:00:42.631
Race 2
Distance	38 laps	160.588 km
Pole position	(Germany) René Rast; Audi Sport Team Rosberg	1:25.384
Winner	(Switzerland) Nico Müller; Audi Sport Team Abt	57:37.468

The 2019 DTM Misano round is a motor racing event for the Deutsche Tourenwagen Masters held between 8 and 9 June 2019. The event, part of the 33rd season of the DTM, was held at the Misano World Circuit Marco Simoncelli in Italy.

== Background ==
Jamie Green was forced to sit out the event with appendicitis, and would be replaced with Audi Sport Team WRT driver Pietro Fittipaldi. Fittipaldi's seat was taken by 2017 and 2018 MotoGP runner-up Andrea Dovizioso, marking the Italian's debut in auto racing.

== Results ==
=== Race 1 ===
==== Qualifying ====
Pos.	No.	Driver	Team	Car	Time	Gap	Grid	Pts
1	33	(Germany) René Rast	Audi Sport Team Rosberg	Audi RS5 Turbo DTM	1:25.294		1	3
2	27	(South Africa) Jonathan Aberdein	Audi Sport Team WRT	Audi RS5 Turbo DTM	1:25.362	+0.068	2	2
3	28	(France) Loïc Duval	Audi Sport Team Phoenix	Audi RS5 Turbo DTM	1:25.543	+0.249	3	1
4	4	(Netherlands) Robin Frijns	Audi Sport Team Abt	Audi RS5 Turbo DTM	1:25.680	+0.386	4	
5	31	(South Africa) Sheldon van der Linde	BMW Team RBM	BMW M4 Turbo DTM	1:25.840	+0.546	5	
6	7	(Canada) Bruno Spengler	BMW Team RMG	BMW M4 Turbo DTM	1:25.900	+0.606	6	
7	25	(Austria) Philipp Eng	BMW Team RMR	BMW M4 Turbo DTM	1:25.943	+0.649	7	
8	51	(Switzerland) Nico Müller	Audi Sport Team Abt	Audi RS5 Turbo DTM	1:25.978	+0.684	8	
9	99	(Germany) Mike Rockenfeller	Audi Sport Team Phoenix	Audi RS5 Turbo DTM	1:26.032	+0.738	9	
10	16	(Germany) Timo Glock	BMW Team RMR	BMW M4 Turbo DTM	1:26.153	+0.859	10	
11	21	(Brazil) Pietro Fittipaldi	Audi Sport Team Rosberg	Audi RS5 Turbo DTM	1:26.583	+1.289	11	
12	47	(Sweden) Joel Eriksson	BMW Team RBM	BMW M4 Turbo DTM	1:26.832	+1.538	12	
13	76	(United Kingdom) Jake Dennis	R-Motorsport	Aston Martin Vantage DTM	1:26.841	+1.547	13	
14	23	(Spain) Daniel Juncadella	R-Motorsport	Aston Martin Vantage DTM	1:26.887	+1.593	14	
15	34	(Italy) Andrea Dovizioso	Audi Sport Team WRT	Audi RS5 Turbo DTM	1:27.037	+1.743	15	
16	62	(Austria) Ferdinand von Habsburg	R-Motorsport	Aston Martin Vantage DTM	1:27.191	+1.897	16	
17	3	(United Kingdom) Paul di Resta	R-Motorsport	Aston Martin Vantage DTM	1:27.772	+2.478	17	
NC	11	(Germany) Marco Wittmann	BMW Team RMG	BMW M4 Turbo DTM	No time		18	

==== Race ====
Pos	No.	Driver	Team	Car	Laps	Time / Retired	Grid	Pts
1	11	(Germany) Marco Wittmann	BMW Team RMG	BMW M4 Turbo DTM	39	1:00:42.631	18	25
2	33	(Germany) René Rast	Audi Sport Team Rosberg	Audi RS5 Turbo DTM	39	+8.238	1	18
3	28	(France) Loïc Duval	Audi Sport Team Phoenix	Audi RS5 Turbo DTM	39	+17.686	3	15
4	7	(Canada) Bruno Spengler	BMW Team RMG	BMW M4 Turbo DTM	39	+22.853	6	12
5	51	(Switzerland) Nico Müller	Audi Sport Team Abt	Audi RS5 Turbo DTM	39	+28.503	8	10
6	99	(Germany) Mike Rockenfeller	Audi Sport Team Phoenix	Audi RS5 Turbo DTM	39	+32.467	9	8
7	25	(Austria) Philipp Eng	BMW Team RMR	BMW M4 Turbo DTM	39	+44.922	7	6
8	27	(South Africa) Jonathan Aberdein	Audi Sport Team WRT	Audi RS5 Turbo DTM	39	+47.238	2	4
9	31	(South Africa) Sheldon van der Linde	BMW Team RBM	BMW M4 Turbo DTM	39	+48.347	5	2
10	16	(Germany) Timo Glock	BMW Team RMR	BMW M4 Turbo DTM	39	+48.429	10	1
11	21	(Brazil) Pietro Fittipaldi	Audi Sport Team Rosberg	Audi RS5 Turbo DTM	39	+50.043	11	
12	34	(Italy) Andrea Dovizioso	Audi Sport Team WRT	Audi RS5 Turbo DTM	39	+57.138	15	
13	23	(Spain) Daniel Juncadella	R-Motorsport	Aston Martin Vantage DTM	39	+58.948	14	
14	62	(Austria) Ferdinand von Habsburg	R-Motorsport	Aston Martin Vantage DTM	39	+1:01.928	16	
15	76	(United Kingdom) Jake Dennis	R-Motorsport	Aston Martin Vantage DTM	39	+1:08.229	13	
16	3	(United Kingdom) Paul di Resta	R-Motorsport	Aston Martin Vantage DTM	31	+8 Laps	17	
Ret	4	(Netherlands) Robin Frijns	Audi Sport Team Abt	Audi RS5 Turbo DTM	16	Mechanical	4	
Ret	47	(Sweden) Joel Eriksson	BMW Team RBM	BMW M4 Turbo DTM	2	Mechanical	12	
Fastest lap set by Philipp Eng: 1:27.991

=== Race 2 ===
==== Qualifying ====
Pos.	No.	Driver	Team	Car	Time	Gap	Grid	Pts
1	33	(Germany) René Rast	Audi Sport Team Rosberg	Audi RS5 Turbo DTM	1:25.384		1	3
2	4	(Netherlands) Robin Frijns	Audi Sport Team Abt	Audi RS5 Turbo DTM	1:25.454	+0.070	2	2
3	27	(South Africa) Jonathan Aberdein	Audi Sport Team WRT	Audi RS5 Turbo DTM	1:25.584	+0.200	3	1
4	51	(Switzerland) Nico Müller	Audi Sport Team Abt	Audi RS5 Turbo DTM	1:25.632	+0.248	4	
5	21	(Brazil) Pietro Fittipaldi	Audi Sport Team Rosberg	Audi RS5 Turbo DTM	1:25.659	+0.275	5	
6	11	(Germany) Marco Wittmann	BMW Team RMG	BMW M4 Turbo DTM	1:25.764	+0.380	6	
7	28	(France) Loïc Duval	Audi Sport Team Phoenix	Audi RS5 Turbo DTM	1:25.767	+0.383	7	
8	47	(Sweden) Joel Eriksson	BMW Team RBM	BMW M4 Turbo DTM	1:25.803	+0.419	8	
9	25	(Austria) Philipp Eng	BMW Team RMR	BMW M4 Turbo DTM	1:25.805	+0.421	9	
10	16	(Germany) Timo Glock	BMW Team RMR	BMW M4 Turbo DTM	1:25.814	+0.430	10	
11	31	(South Africa) Sheldon van der Linde	BMW Team RBM	BMW M4 Turbo DTM	1:25.981	+0.597	11	
12	99	(Germany) Mike Rockenfeller	Audi Sport Team Phoenix	Audi RS5 Turbo DTM	1:26.005	+0.621	12	
13	7	(Canada) Bruno Spengler	BMW Team RMG	BMW M4 Turbo DTM	1:26.458	+1.074	13	
14	34	(Italy) Andrea Dovizioso	Audi Sport Team WRT	Audi RS5 Turbo DTM	1:26.703	+1.319	14	
15	76	(United Kingdom) Jake Dennis	R-Motorsport	Aston Martin Vantage DTM	1:26.831	+1.447	15	
16	23	(Spain) Daniel Juncadella	R-Motorsport	Aston Martin Vantage DTM	1:27.009	+1.625	16	
17	3	(United Kingdom) Paul di Resta	R-Motorsport	Aston Martin Vantage DTM	1:27.198	+1.814	17	
18	62	(Austria) Ferdinand Habsburg	R-Motorsport	Aston Martin Vantage DTM	1:27.325	+1.941	18	

==== Race ====
Pos	No.	Driver	Team	Car	Laps	Time / Retired	Grid	Pts
1	51	(Switzerland) Nico Müller	Audi Sport Team Abt	Audi RS5 Turbo DTM	38	57:37.468	4	25
2	25	(Austria) Philipp Eng	BMW Team RMR	BMW M4 Turbo DTM	38	+7.628	9	18
3	33	(Germany) René Rast	Audi Sport Team Rosberg	Audi RS5 Turbo DTM	38	+16.804	1	15
4	4	(Netherlands) Robin Frijns	Audi Sport Team Abt	Audi RS5 Turbo DTM	38	+20.072	2	12
5	21	(Brazil) Pietro Fittipaldi	Audi Sport Team Rosberg	Audi RS5 Turbo DTM	38	+20.430	5	10
6	47	(Sweden) Joel Eriksson	BMW Team RBM	BMW M4 Turbo DTM	38	+23.645	9	8
7	27	(South Africa) Jonathan Aberdein	Audi Sport Team WRT	Audi RS5 Turbo DTM	38	+24.813	3	6
8	7	(Canada) Bruno Spengler	BMW Team RMG	BMW M4 Turbo DTM	38	+28.460	13	4
9	31	(South Africa) Sheldon van der Linde	BMW Team RBM	Audi RS5 Turbo DTM	38	+29.003	11	2
10	99	(Germany) Mike Rockenfeller	Audi Sport Team Phoenix	Audi RS5 Turbo DTM	38	+47.798	12	1
11	28	(France) Loïc Duval	Audi Sport Team Phoenix	Audi RS5 Turbo DTM	38	+47.902	17	
12	62	(Austria) Ferdinand von Habsburg	R-Motorsport	Aston Martin Vantage DTM	38	+48.678	18	
13	76	(United Kingdom) Jake Dennis	R-Motorsport	Aston Martin Vantage DTM	38	+51.588	15	
14	23	(Spain) Daniel Juncadella	R-Motorsport	Aston Martin Vantage DTM	38	+1:14.053	16	
15	34	(Italy) Andrea Dovizioso	Audi Sport Team WRT	Audi RS5 Turbo DTM	38	+1:16.392	14	
Ret	16	(Germany) Timo Glock	BMW Team RMR	BMW M4 Turbo DTM	8	Mechanical	10	
Ret	3	(United Kingdom) Paul di Resta	R-Motorsport	Aston Martin Vantage DTM	6	Mechanical	17	
Ret	11	(Germany) Marco Wittmann	BMW Team RMG	BMW M4 Turbo DTM	1	Crash	6	
Fastest lap set by Robin Frijns: 1:27.291

== Championship standings ==
Drivers Championship

	Pos	Driver	Pts	Gap
1	1	(Germany) René Rast	93	
1	2	(Austria) Philipp Eng	83	-10
2	3	(Switzerland) Nico Müller	76	-17
1	4	(Germany) Marco Wittmann	68	-25
1	5	(Germany) Mike Rockenfeller	51	-42

Teams Championship

	Pos	Team	Pts	Gap
	1	(Germany) Audi Sport Team Rosberg (21, 33)	128	
1	2	(Germany) Audi Sport Team Abt (4, 51)	121	-7
1	3	(Germany) BMW Team RMG (7, 11)	108	-20
3	4	(Belgium) BMW Team RMR (16, 25)	104	-24
	5	(Germany) Audi Sport Team Phoenix (28, 99)	89	-39

Manufacturers Championship

Pos	Drivers	Pts	Gap
1	(Germany) Audi	340	
2	(Germany) BMW	263	-77
3	(United Kingdom) Aston Martin	23	-317

- Note: Only the top five positions are included for three sets of standings.

== See also ==
- 2019 W Series Misano round

Previous race: 2019 Zolder DTM round	Deutsche Tourenwagen Masters; 2019 season	Next race: 2019 Norisring Nürnberg 200 Speedweekend
