= 2019 Deutsche Tourenwagen Masters =

2019 touring car series in Germany

Champions
- Drivers' Champion: René Rast
- Teams' Champion: Team Rosberg
- Manufacturers' Championship: Audi

Seasons
- ← 2018 2020 →

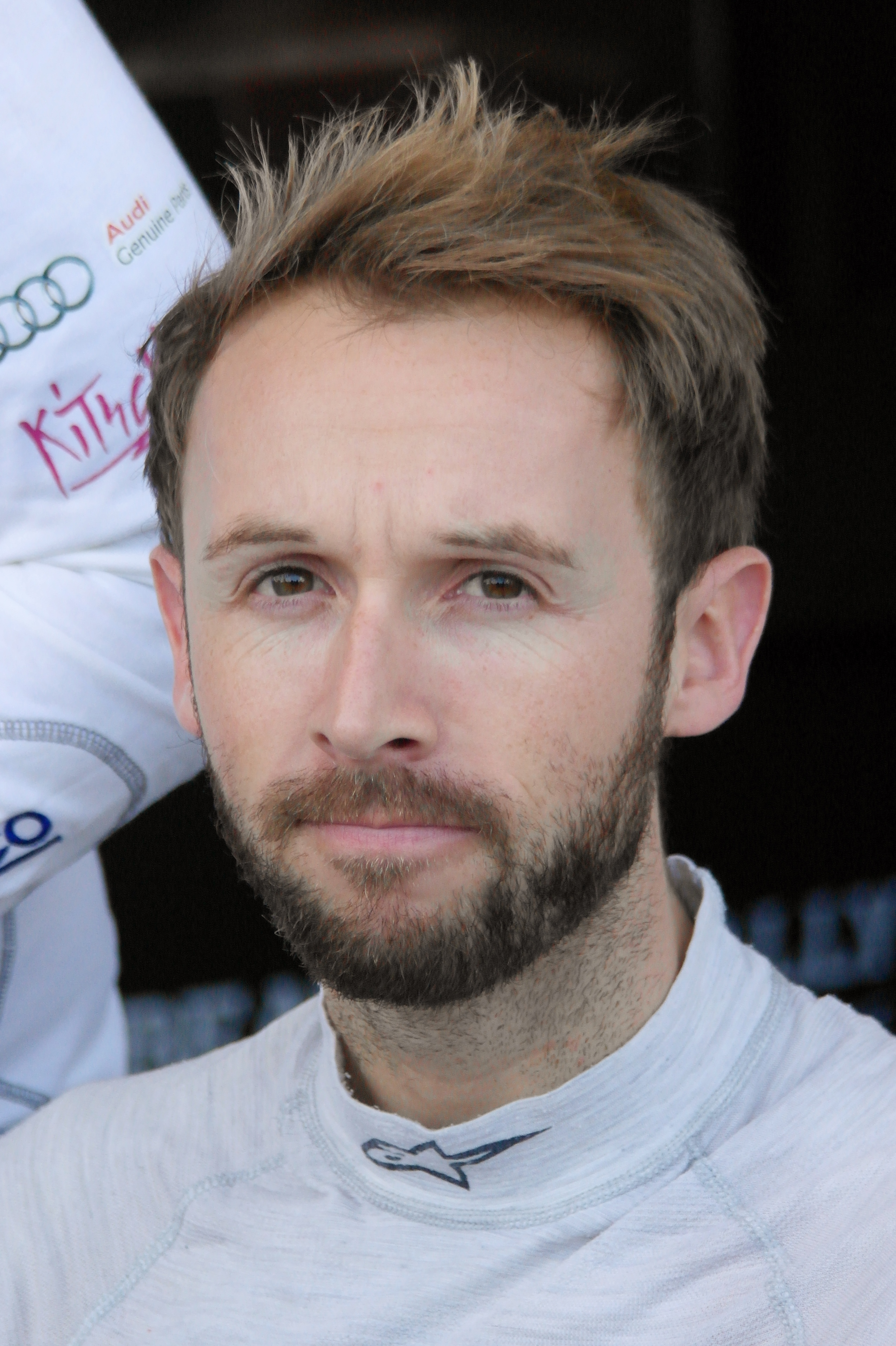
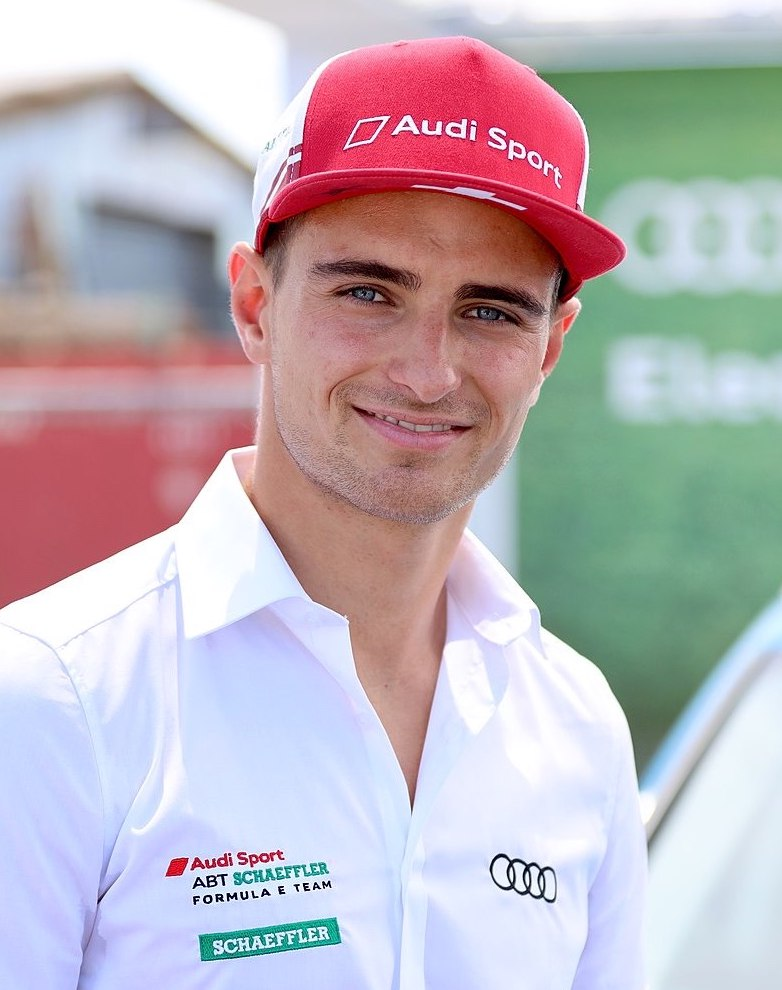
René Rast (left) won his second Drivers' Championship while Nico Müller (right) finished second in the championship.

The 2019 DTM was the thirty-third season of premier German touring car championship, first season under "Class 1" regulations era and also twentieth season under the moniker of DTM since the series' resumption in 2000. Mercedes-AMG withdrew from the championship after the 2018 season to focus on their Formula E entry. British sports car manufacturer Aston Martin replaced Mercedes-Benz, which marked the first non-German entry in 23 years when Italian car manufacturer Alfa Romeo last entered the series under the International Touring Car Series name in 1996. Defending champion Gary Paffett did not return to defend his title, as he moved to Formula E.

The 2019 season oversaw the championship introduce revolutionary regulations known as "Class 1", the biggest change to the sport in recent history. These regulations will be shared between the DTM and the Japanese Super GT series' GT500 class from 2020, allowing entries to compete in both championships. The 2019 championship saw the running of the 500th DTM race, which was held as the second race at Lausitzring.

Audi clinched the manufacturers' championship title for the seventh time, with four races to spare. René Rast clinched his second DTM driver's title in the Nürburgring round.

== Rule changes ==
=== Technical regulations ===
==== Engine formula ====
- The 2019 season saw the introduction of a brand-new prototype road car-based fuel-efficient engine configuration, with turbocharged engines returned to the sport for the first time since 1989. The new engines were 2.0 litres (122 cubic inches) inline-4 cylinder format single-turbocharged engines, tuned to produce approximately 610 horsepower (450 kilowatts) and limited to 9,500 rpm as it was announced on 20 January 2016 and thus the new engine formula will be known as "Class 1" that based on Nippon Race Engine (NRE) as it used by Japanese Super GT and Super Formula; Garrett Advancing Motion would provide the TR35R turbochargers for all DTM cars from 2019 onwards that same specification as GT500 class in Super GT. Individual engine units under the 2019 specifications had to last for at least 6,000 km (3,728 miles) before being replaced, in comparison to the pre-2019 engines, which were required to last for 10,000 km (6,214 miles). Engine unit changes during a race weekend result in a 10-place grid penalty for the requisite driver. All engines would remain to run on Aral Ultimate 102 RON unleaded fuel. The traditional 4.0 litres (244 cubic inches) naturally-aspirated V8 engines that were used since 2000 were permanently retired. The all-new engine configuration also incorporates the IndyCar-style push-to-pass overtake assist system in a bid to improve the racing spectacle; the push-to-pass system will produce around 30 hp (22 kW) and will be used by the driver up to 12 times in a race.

==== Aerodynamics and other components ====
- The single-plane element rear wing returns for the first time since 2016 but would be wider. As a result, the Drag Reduction Systems (DRS) used for assisting overtaking maneuvers will be revised, with use now within three seconds of a driver in front.
- The minimum weight of the cars was decreased from 1,115 to 1,070 kg (2,458 to 2,359 lb) (including driver and fuel respectively) to account for the decreased weight of the engine and other components.
- Launch control was outlawed, while the traditional interior rear view mirror was replaced by a rear-view camera. Meanwhile all electronic devices were upgraded due to new Class 1 regulations including all-new Bosch DDU 10 color display dash, Bosch MS 7.4 engine management system, Bosch PBX 190 power management systems and also Tyre Pressure Management Systems (TPMS).

=== Sporting regulations ===
- The two races per round format was retained, but the fixed lap distance format (last used in 2014) was initially brought back, replacing the timed race format (55 minutes plus 1 lap most recently) that had been used for the previous 4 years; there was a caveat in the case of a safety car period, the race could be extended by up to 3 laps. However after the opening round of the season, the previous timed race format was reinstated with the addition of the race-extending safety car rule.

== Teams and drivers ==
The following manufacturers, teams and drivers competed in the 2019 DTM, including the non championship round in Japan.

Manufacturer	Car	Engine	Team	No.	Driver name	Tyre	Rounds
Aston Martin	Aston Martin Vantage DTM 2019	HWA AFR Turbo 2.0 I-4t	(Switzerland) R-Motorsport (Note: For the teams' championship points Car no. 3 & 76 under the R-Motorsport I, and Car no. 23 & 62 under the R-Motorsport II)	3	(United Kingdom) Paul di Resta	H	All
Aston Martin	Aston Martin Vantage DTM 2019	HWA AFR Turbo 2.0 I-4t	(Switzerland) R-Motorsport	23	(Spain) Daniel Juncadella	H	All
Aston Martin	Aston Martin Vantage DTM 2019	HWA AFR Turbo 2.0 I-4t	(Switzerland) R-Motorsport	62	(Austria) Ferdinand von Habsburg	H	All
Aston Martin	Aston Martin Vantage DTM 2019	HWA AFR Turbo 2.0 I-4t	(Switzerland) R-Motorsport	76	(United Kingdom) Jake Dennis	H	All
Audi	Audi RS5 Turbo DTM 2019	Audi RC8 2.0 TFSI I-4t	(Germany) Audi Sport Team Abt Sportsline	4	(Netherlands) Robin Frijns	H	All
Audi	Audi RS5 Turbo DTM 2019	Audi RC8 2.0 TFSI I-4t	(Germany) Audi Sport Team Abt Sportsline	51	(Switzerland) Nico Müller	H	All
Audi	Audi RS5 Turbo DTM 2019	Audi RC8 2.0 TFSI I-4t	(Germany) Audi Sport Team Abt Sportsline	99	(Germany) Mike Rockenfeller	H	NC
Audi	Audi RS5 Turbo DTM 2019	Audi RC8 2.0 TFSI I-4t	(Belgium) Audi Sport Team WRT (Note: For the non championship round, car no. 21 entered as Audi Sport Team WRT Hitotsuyama) (Japan) Audi Sport Team WRT Hitotsuyama	21	(Brazil) Pietro Fittipaldi	H	1–2, 4–9
Audi	Audi RS5 Turbo DTM 2019	Audi RC8 2.0 TFSI I-4t	(Belgium) Audi Sport Team WRT (Japan) Audi Sport Team WRT Hitotsuyama	21	(France) Benoît Tréluyer	H	NC
Audi	Audi RS5 Turbo DTM 2019	Audi RC8 2.0 TFSI I-4t	(Belgium) Audi Sport Team WRT (Japan) Audi Sport Team WRT Hitotsuyama	27	(South Africa) Jonathan Aberdein	H	All
Audi	Audi RS5 Turbo DTM 2019	Audi RC8 2.0 TFSI I-4t	(Belgium) Audi Sport Team WRT (Japan) Audi Sport Team WRT Hitotsuyama	34	(Italy) Andrea Dovizioso	H	3
Audi	Audi RS5 Turbo DTM 2019	Audi RC8 2.0 TFSI I-4t	(Germany) Audi Sport Team Rosberg	21	(Brazil) Pietro Fittipaldi	H	3
Audi	Audi RS5 Turbo DTM 2019	Audi RC8 2.0 TFSI I-4t	(Germany) Audi Sport Team Rosberg	33	(Germany) René Rast	H	All, NC
Audi	Audi RS5 Turbo DTM 2019	Audi RC8 2.0 TFSI I-4t	(Germany) Audi Sport Team Rosberg	53	(United Kingdom) Jamie Green	H	1–2, 4–9
Audi	Audi RS5 Turbo DTM 2019	Audi RC8 2.0 TFSI I-4t	(Germany) Audi Sport Team Phoenix	28	(France) Loïc Duval	H	All, NC
Audi	Audi RS5 Turbo DTM 2019	Audi RC8 2.0 TFSI I-4t	(Germany) Audi Sport Team Phoenix	99	(Germany) Mike Rockenfeller	H	All
BMW	BMW M4 Turbo DTM 2019	BMW P48 Turbo I-4t	(Belgium) BMW Team RBM	00	(Japan) Kamui Kobayashi	H	NC
BMW	BMW M4 Turbo DTM 2019	BMW P48 Turbo I-4t	(Belgium) BMW Team RBM	4	(Italy) Alex Zanardi	H	NC
BMW	BMW M4 Turbo DTM 2019	BMW P48 Turbo I-4t	(Belgium) BMW Team RBM	11	(Germany) Marco Wittmann	H	NC
BMW	BMW M4 Turbo DTM 2019	BMW P48 Turbo I-4t	(Belgium) BMW Team RBM	31	(South Africa) Sheldon van der Linde	H	All
BMW	BMW M4 Turbo DTM 2019	BMW P48 Turbo I-4t	(Belgium) BMW Team RBM	47	(Sweden) Joel Eriksson	H	All
BMW	BMW M4 Turbo DTM 2019	BMW P48 Turbo I-4t	(Germany) BMW Team RMG	7	(Canada) Bruno Spengler	H	All
BMW	BMW M4 Turbo DTM 2019	BMW P48 Turbo I-4t	(Germany) BMW Team RMG	11	(Germany) Marco Wittmann	H	All
BMW	BMW M4 Turbo DTM 2019	BMW P48 Turbo I-4t	(Belgium) BMW Team RMR	16	(Germany) Timo Glock	H	All
BMW	BMW M4 Turbo DTM 2019	BMW P48 Turbo I-4t	(Belgium) BMW Team RMR	25	(Austria) Philipp Eng	H	All
Honda	Honda NSX-GT GT500	Honda HR-417E 2.0 L Turbo I4	(Japan) Team Kunimitsu	1	(United Kingdom) Jenson Button	H	9
Honda	Honda NSX-GT GT500	Honda HR-417E 2.0 L Turbo I4	(Japan) Team Kunimitsu	1	(Japan) Naoki Yamamoto	B	NC
Honda	Honda NSX-GT GT500	Honda HR-417E 2.0 L Turbo I4	(Japan) ARTA	8	(Japan) Takuya Izawa	B	NC1
Honda	Honda NSX-GT GT500	Honda HR-417E 2.0 L Turbo I4	(Japan) ARTA	8	(Japan) Tomoki Nojiri	B	NC2
Honda	Honda NSX-GT GT500	Honda HR-417E 2.0 L Turbo I4	(Japan) Team Mugen	16	(Japan) Daisuke Nakajima	Y	NC1
Honda	Honda NSX-GT GT500	Honda HR-417E 2.0 L Turbo I4	(Japan) Team Mugen	16	(Japan) Hideki Mutoh	Y	NC2
Honda	Honda NSX-GT GT500	Honda HR-417E 2.0 L Turbo I4	(Japan) Keihin Real Racing	17	(Japan) Koudai Tsukakoshi	B	NC
Honda	Honda NSX-GT GT500	Honda HR-417E 2.0 L Turbo I4	(Japan) Modulo Nakajima Racing	64	(Japan) Tadasuke Makino	D	NC1
Honda	Honda NSX-GT GT500	Honda HR-417E 2.0 L Turbo I4	(Japan) Modulo Nakajima Racing	64	(India) Narain Karthikeyan	D	NC2
Lexus	Lexus LC 500 GT500	Lexus RI4AG 2.0 L Turbo I4	(Japan) Lexus Team LeMans Wako's	6	(Japan) Kenta Yamashita	B	NC1
Lexus	Lexus LC 500 GT500	Lexus RI4AG 2.0 L Turbo I4	(Japan) Lexus Team LeMans Wako's	6	(Japan) Kazuya Oshima	B	NC2
Lexus	Lexus LC 500 GT500	Lexus RI4AG 2.0 L Turbo I4	(Japan) Lexus Team WedsSport Bandoh	19	(Japan) Sho Tsuboi	B	NC1
Lexus	Lexus LC 500 GT500	Lexus RI4AG 2.0 L Turbo I4	(Japan) Lexus Team WedsSport Bandoh	19	(Japan) Yuji Kunimoto	B	NC2
Lexus	Lexus LC 500 GT500	Lexus RI4AG 2.0 L Turbo I4	(Japan) Lexus Team au TOM'S	36	(Japan) Yuhi Sekiguchi	B	NC1
Lexus	Lexus LC 500 GT500	Lexus RI4AG 2.0 L Turbo I4	(Japan) Lexus Team au TOM'S	36	(Japan) Kazuki Nakajima	B	NC2
Lexus	Lexus LC 500 GT500	Lexus RI4AG 2.0 L Turbo I4	(Japan) Lexus Team KeePer TOM'S	37	(Japan) Ryo Hirakawa	H	9
Lexus	Lexus LC 500 GT500	Lexus RI4AG 2.0 L Turbo I4	(Japan) Lexus Team KeePer TOM'S	37	(New Zealand) Nick Cassidy	H	9
Lexus	Lexus LC 500 GT500	Lexus RI4AG 2.0 L Turbo I4	(Japan) Lexus Team KeePer TOM'S	37	(New Zealand) Nick Cassidy	B	NC1
Lexus	Lexus LC 500 GT500	Lexus RI4AG 2.0 L Turbo I4	(Japan) Lexus Team KeePer TOM'S	37	(Japan) Ryo Hirakawa	B	NC2
Lexus	Lexus LC 500 GT500	Lexus RI4AG 2.0 L Turbo I4	(Japan) Lexus Team ZENT Cerumo	38	(Japan) Yuji Tachikawa	B	NC1
Lexus	Lexus LC 500 GT500	Lexus RI4AG 2.0 L Turbo I4	(Japan) Lexus Team ZENT Cerumo	38	(Japan) Hiroaki Ishiura	B	NC2
Lexus	Lexus LC 500 GT500	Lexus RI4AG 2.0 L Turbo I4	(Japan) Lexus Team SARD	39	(Japan) Yuichi Nakayama	B	NC1
Lexus	Lexus LC 500 GT500	Lexus RI4AG 2.0 L Turbo I4	(Japan) Lexus Team SARD	39	(Finland) Heikki Kovalainen	B	NC2
Nissan	Nissan GT-R NISMO GT500	Nissan NR20A 2.0 L Turbo I4	(Japan) NDDP Racing with B-Max Racing	3	(France) Frederic Makowiecki	M	NC1
Nissan	Nissan GT-R NISMO GT500	Nissan NR20A 2.0 L Turbo I4	(Japan) NDDP Racing with B-Max Racing	3	(Japan) Kohei Hirate	M	NC2
Nissan	Nissan GT-R NISMO GT500	Nissan NR20A 2.0 L Turbo I4	(Japan) Team Impul	12	(United Kingdom) James Rossiter	B	NC1
Nissan	Nissan GT-R NISMO GT500	Nissan NR20A 2.0 L Turbo I4	(Japan) Team Impul	12	(Japan) Daiki Sasaki	B	NC2
Nissan	Nissan GT-R NISMO GT500	Nissan NR20A 2.0 L Turbo I4	(Japan) Nismo	23	(Italy) Ronnie Quintarelli	M	NC1
Nissan	Nissan GT-R NISMO GT500	Nissan NR20A 2.0 L Turbo I4	(Japan) Nismo	23	(Japan) Tsugio Matsuda	M	NC2
Nissan	Nissan GT-R NISMO GT500	Nissan NR20A 2.0 L Turbo I4	(Japan) Nismo	35	(Japan) Tsugio Matsuda	H	9
Nissan	Nissan GT-R NISMO GT500	Nissan NR20A 2.0 L Turbo I4	(Japan) Nismo	35	(Italy) Ronnie Quintarelli	H	9
Nissan	Nissan GT-R NISMO GT500	Nissan NR20A 2.0 L Turbo I4	(Japan) Kondo Racing	24	(United Kingdom) Jann Mardenborough	Y	NC1
Nissan	Nissan GT-R NISMO GT500	Nissan NR20A 2.0 L Turbo I4	(Japan) Kondo Racing	24	(Japan) Mitsunori Takaboshi	Y	NC2

=== Manufacturer and team changes ===
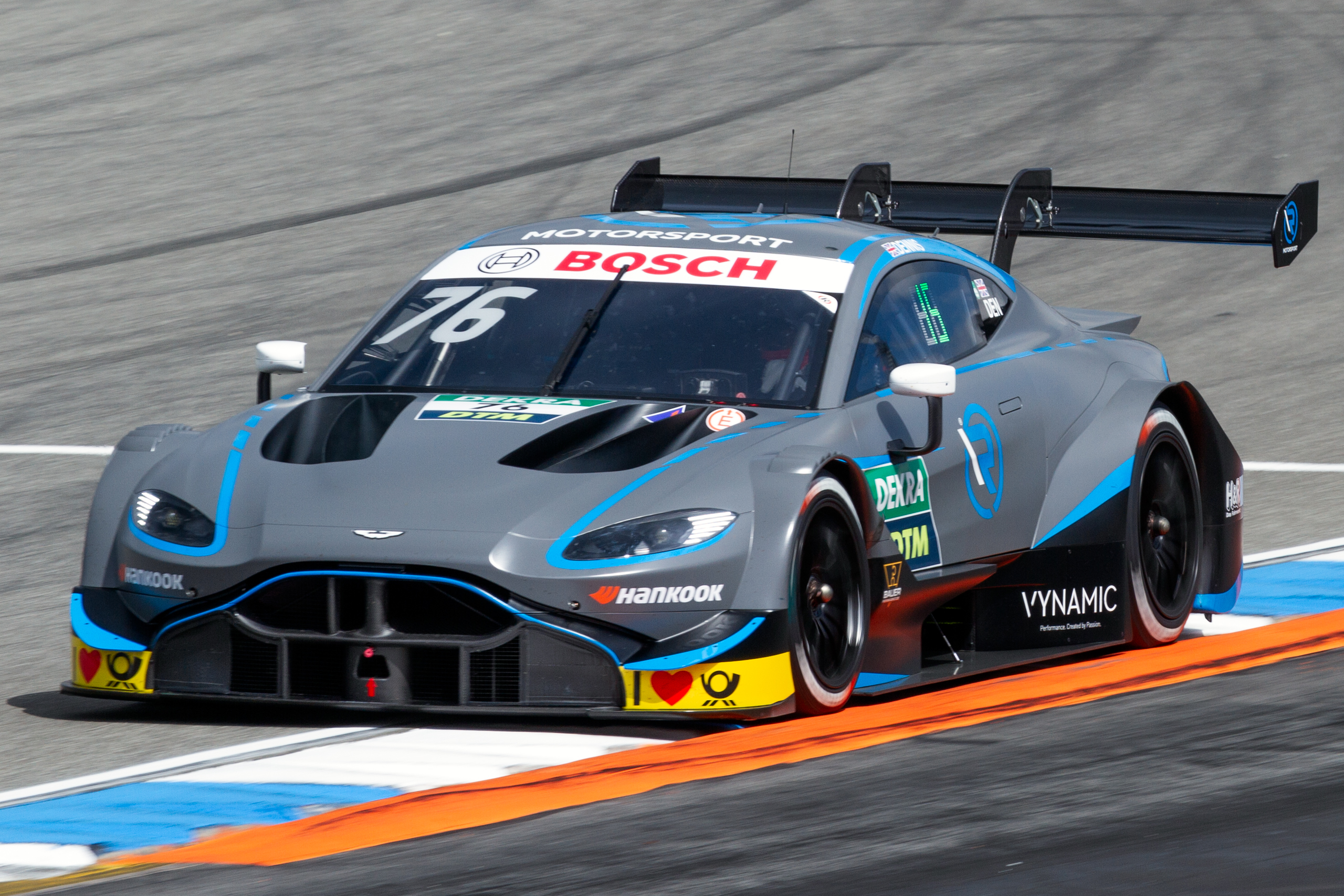
Jake Dennis driving the Aston Martin Vantage DTM during practice at the Hockenheimring.

- After 19 years utilised the Mugen Honda MF308-derived engine, the Audi RS5 Turbo DTM would use the in-house bespoke inline-four turbo engine.
- Aston Martin entered the championship, replacing Mercedes-Benz, with cars based on the Vantage. The entry is run by AF Racing AG and built by HWA.
- W Racing Team entered the championship as a customer team, fielding two Audi RS5 Turbo DTM machines. They were the first Audi Sport DTM independent customer team since Futurecom TME, that competed between 2006 and 2009.
- Super GT manufacturers Honda, Lexus and Nissan fielded one car each as wildcard entries at the Hockenheimring season finale, to mark the beginning of the shared "Class 1" regulations for DTM and Super GT GT500.

=== Driver changes ===
- Augusto Farfus left the series after seven years to join BRC Hyundai N Lukoil Racing Team in the World Touring Car Cup. He continued his association with BMW in the FIA World Endurance Championship. He was replaced by 2018 ADAC GT Masters runner-up Sheldon van der Linde.
- Reigning champion Gary Paffett left the series after sixteen years to compete with HWA Racelab in Formula E. Pascal Wehrlein (Mahindra Racing) and Edoardo Mortara (Venturi) also compete in Formula E.
- Following Mercedes' exit from the series, Lucas Auer joined Super Formula with the B-Max Racing with Motopark team.
- Ferdinand Habsburg and Jake Dennis made their DTM débuts with the R-Motorsport Aston Martin team.
- 2016–17 Formula 4 UAE Championship winner Jonathan Aberdein and 2017 World Series Formula V8 3.5 champion Pietro Fittipaldi made their DTM débuts with the W Racing Team.

==== Mid-season changes ====
- Ducati MotoGP rider Andrea Dovizioso was announced to be replacing Pietro Fittipaldi at Misano due to Fittipaldi having a Friday practice commitment for the Haas F1 Team at the concurrent Canadian Grand Prix. However, Fittipaldi was announced to be competing in the meeting after all – albeit for Audi Sport Team Rosberg – replacing Jamie Green, who was recovering from appendicitis.

== Calendar ==
A nine-round calendar was announced in October 2018.

Round	Circuit	Race 1	Race 2
1	Hockenheimring, Germany	4 May	5 May
2	Circuit Zolder, Belgium	18 May	19 May
3	Misano World Circuit Marco Simoncelli, Italy	8 June	9 June
4	Norisring, Germany	6 July	7 July
5	TT Circuit Assen, Netherlands	20 July	21 July
6	(United Kingdom) Brands Hatch, Great Britain	10 August	11 August
7	Lausitzring, Germany	24 August	25 August
8	Nürburgring, Germany	14 September	15 September
9	Hockenheimring, Germany	5 October	6 October
NC	Fuji Speedway, Japan	23 November	24 November

=== Calendar changes ===
- With the adoption of Class 1 regulations, the series will share two rounds with the Super GT championship. One is planned to be held in Europe and the other in Asia. A balance of performance formula will be applied to ensure parity between DTM cars and Super GT as Super GT will not adopt Class 1 regulations until 2020.
- The rounds at the Hungaroring, Red Bull Ring and Zandvoort were removed from the schedule. The series will instead make its debut at the TT Circuit Assen and return to Circuit Zolder for the first time since 2002. Meanwhile the Misano round will revert to a daytime start time instead of nighttime.
- A non-championship race will be held at Fuji as a supporting event of the Super GT x DTM Dream Race.

== Results and standings ==
=== Season summary ===
Round		Circuit	Pole position	Fastest lap	Winning driver	Winning team	Winning manufacturer	Report
1	R1	(Germany) Hockenheimring	(Germany) Marco Wittmann	(Germany) Timo Glock	(Germany) Marco Wittmann	BMW Team RMG	BMW	Report
1	R2	(Germany) Hockenheimring	(Austria) Philipp Eng	(Brazil) Pietro Fittipaldi	(Germany) René Rast	Audi Sport Team Rosberg	Audi	Report
2	R1	(Belgium) Circuit Zolder	(Germany) Marco Wittmann	(Netherlands) Robin Frijns	(Austria) Philipp Eng	BMW Team RMR	BMW	Report
2	R2	(Belgium) Circuit Zolder	(South Africa) Sheldon van der Linde	(Austria) Philipp Eng	(Germany) René Rast	Audi Sport Team Rosberg	Audi	Report
3	R1	(Italy) Misano World Circuit Marco Simoncelli	(Germany) René Rast	(Austria) Philipp Eng	(Germany) Marco Wittmann	BMW Team RMG	BMW	Report
3	R2	(Italy) Misano World Circuit Marco Simoncelli	(Germany) René Rast	(Netherlands) Robin Frijns	(Switzerland) Nico Müller	Audi Sport Team Abt Sportsline	Audi	Report
4	R1	(Germany) Norisring	(Switzerland) Nico Müller	(Switzerland) Nico Müller	(Germany) René Rast	Audi Sport Team Rosberg	Audi	Report
4	R2	(Germany) Norisring	(Germany) René Rast	(Switzerland) Nico Müller	(Canada) Bruno Spengler	BMW Team RMG	BMW	Report
5	R1	(Netherlands) TT Circuit Assen	(Germany) Marco Wittmann	(Switzerland) Nico Müller	(Germany) Marco Wittmann	BMW Team RMG	BMW	Report
5	R2	(Netherlands) TT Circuit Assen	(Germany) René Rast	(Austria) Philipp Eng	(Germany) Mike Rockenfeller	Audi Sport Team Phoenix	Audi	Report
6	R1	(United Kingdom) Brands Hatch	(Germany) Marco Wittmann	(Austria) Philipp Eng	(Germany) Marco Wittmann	BMW Team RMG	BMW	Report
6	R2	(United Kingdom) Brands Hatch	(Germany) René Rast	(Brazil) Pietro Fittipaldi	(Germany) René Rast	Audi Sport Team Rosberg	Audi	Report
7	R1	(Germany) Lausitzring	(Germany) René Rast	(Netherlands) Robin Frijns	(Switzerland) Nico Müller	Audi Sport Team Abt Sportsline	Audi	Report
7	R2	(Germany) Lausitzring	(United Kingdom) Jamie Green	(Austria) Philipp Eng	(Germany) René Rast	Audi Sport Team Rosberg	Audi	Report
8	R1	(Germany) Nürburgring	(Germany) René Rast	(Germany) René Rast	(Germany) René Rast	Audi Sport Team Rosberg	Audi	Report
8	R2	(Germany) Nürburgring	(United Kingdom) Jamie Green	(Germany) René Rast	(United Kingdom) Jamie Green	Audi Sport Team Rosberg	Audi	Report
9	R1	(Germany) Hockenheimring	(Germany) René Rast	(Switzerland) Nico Müller	(Germany) René Rast	Audi Sport Team Rosberg	Audi	Report
9	R2	(Germany) Hockenheimring	(Switzerland) Nico Müller (Note: Rockenfeller qualified on pole but received a 5-place grid penalty. Nico Müller started first.)	(Germany) Mike Rockenfeller	(Switzerland) Nico Müller	Audi Sport Team Abt Sportsline	Audi	Report
NC	R1	(Japan) Fuji Speedway	(New Zealand) Nick Cassidy	(Japan) Tadasuke Makino	(New Zealand) Nick Cassidy	Lexus Team KeePer TOM'S	Lexus	Report
NC	R2	(Japan) Fuji Speedway	(France) Loïc Duval (Note: Daisuke Nakajima qualified on pole but received a 5-place grid penalty for a chassis change. Loïc Duval started first.)	(India) Narain Karthikeyan	(India) Narain Karthikeyan	Modulo Nakajima Racing	Honda	Report

=== Scoring system ===
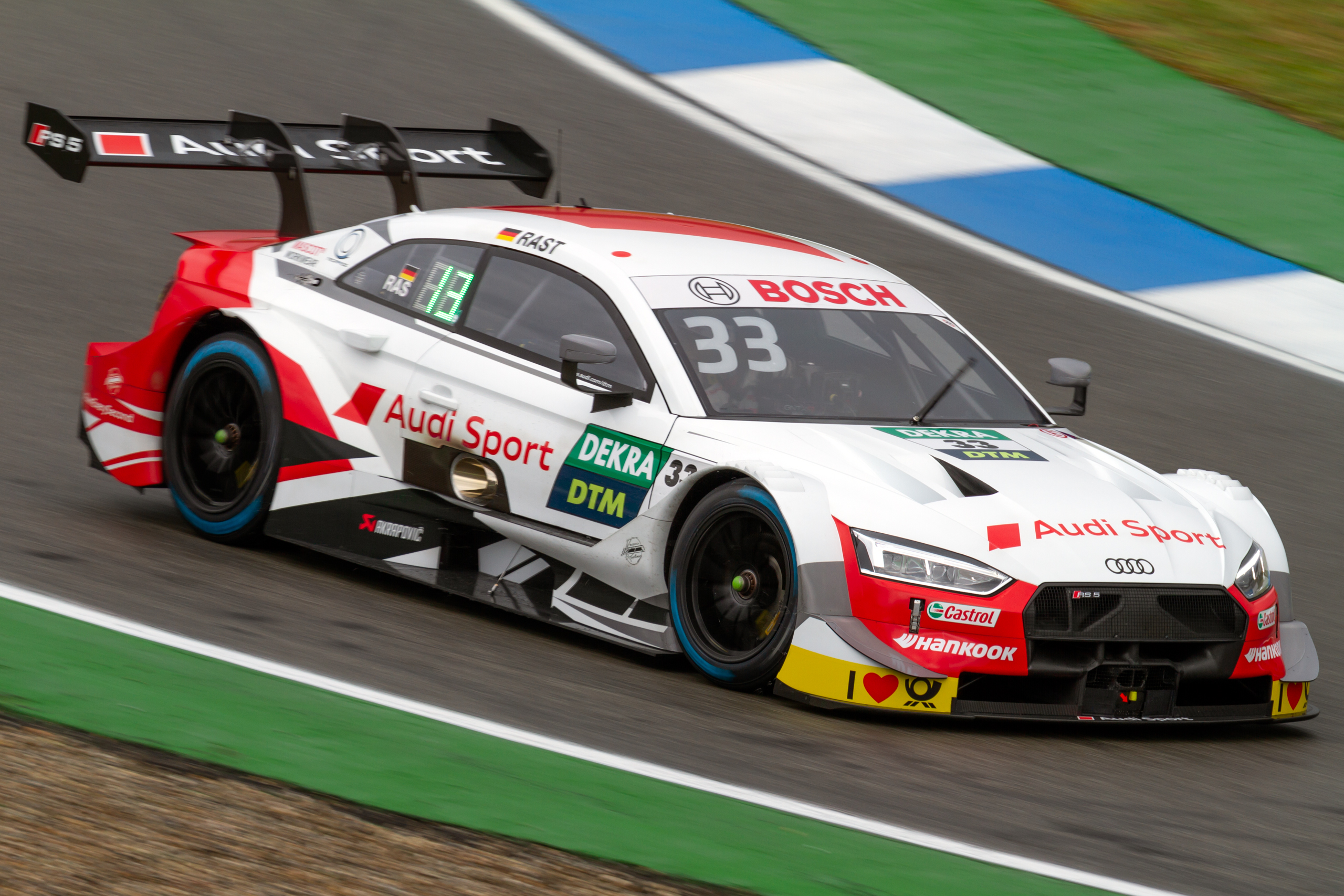
René Rast claimed his second championship.

Points were awarded to the top ten classified finishers as follows:

Race Position	**1st**	**2nd**	**3rd**	**4th**	**5th**	**6th**	**7th**	**8th**	**9th**	**10th**
Points	25	18	15	12	10	8	6	4	2	1

Additionally, the top three placed drivers in qualifying also received points:

Qualifying Position	**1st**	**2nd**	**3rd**
Points	3	2	1

=== Drivers' championship ===
Pos.	Driver	HOC (Germany)		ZOL (Belgium)		MIS (Italy)		NOR (Germany)		ASS (Netherlands)		BRH (United Kingdom)		LAU (Germany)		NÜR (Germany)		HOC (Germany)		FUJ (Japan)		Points
1	(Germany) René Rast	16†	1	NC^{2}	1^{2}	**2**^{1}	**3**^{1}	1^{3}	**7**^{1}	3^{2}	**5**^{1}	2^{2}	**1**^{1}	**Ret**^{1}	1	**1**^{1}	3^{2}	**1**^{1}	3	8	9	322
2	(Switzerland) Nico Müller	8	2	3	8	5	1	**2**^{1}	8^{2}	2	3	3	2	1^{3}	2^{3}	15^{3}	6	17	1^{2}			250
3	(Germany) Marco Wittmann	**1**^{1}	8^{2}	**7**^{1}	13	1	Ret	8	16†	**1**^{1}	2	**1**^{1}	10	4	6	3	Ret	2^{2}	12	18	2	202
4	(Germany) Mike Rockenfeller	2^{2}	Ret	5	4	6	10	Ret	3	9	1^{3}	7	6	3	3	Ret	7^{3}	3^{3}	**2**^{1}	13	7	182
5	(Netherlands) Robin Frijns	3	3^{3}	12	Ret	Ret	4^{2}	Ret	4	Ret	6	4	3^{3}	2	5	DSQ	2	4	7			157
6	(Austria) Philipp Eng	14	**4**^{1}	1	2^{3}	7	2	7	5	4	13	6	5	5	10	13	8	Ret	14			144
7	(France) Loïc Duval	5	Ret	4	11	3^{3}	11	4	6^{3}	8^{3}	11	5^{3}	4^{2}	6	8	5	4	5	10	Ret	**3**	134
8	(United Kingdom) Jamie Green	12	9	6	3			11	2	7	9	11	15	10^{2}	**4**^{1}	6	**1**^{1}	12	5			115
9	(Canada) Bruno Spengler	7	5	10^{3}	7	4	8	5^{2}	1	15	Ret	12	Ret	9	14	2^{2}	10	8	9			106
10	(South Africa) Jonathan Aberdein	15	14	NC	12	8^{2}	7^{3}	13	14	6	4^{2}	9	13	14	7^{2}	4	5	14	Ret			67
11	(Sweden) Joel Eriksson	13	10	2	10	Ret	6	3	13	16	16†	DNS	Ret	8	13	8	11	10	6			61
12	(Germany) Timo Glock	4	6	13	14	10	Ret	Ret	9	5	14	13	12	Ret	15†	9	9	6	4^{3}			58
13	(South Africa) Sheldon van der Linde	6	13	11	**5**^{1}	9	9	Ret	Ret	10	15	8	7	16	11	7	16	16	13			42
14	(Spain) Daniel Juncadella	9	16	Ret	Ret	13	14	6	10	Ret	7	10	8	12	12	10	12	Ret	Ret			23
15	(Brazil) Pietro Fittipaldi	10	15	14	9	11	5	Ret	15	11	10	DNS	16	7	9	14	13	15	15			22
16	(United Kingdom) Paul di Resta	Ret^{3}	7	8	DNS	16	Ret	12	Ret	14	8	14†	14	13	Ret	12	DNS	7	DNS			21
17	(United Kingdom) Jake Dennis	11	11	Ret	6	15	13	9	12	12	Ret	Ret	9	11	Ret	Ret	14	11	8			17
18	(Austria) Ferdinand von Habsburg	Ret	12	9	Ret	14	12	10	11	13	12	15†	11	15	Ret	11	15	DNS	11			3
19	(Italy) Andrea Dovizioso					12	15															0
Guest drivers ineligible to score points
—	(New Zealand) Nick Cassidy																		Ret	**1**		—
—	(India) Narain Karthikeyan																				1	—
—	(Japan) Koudai Tsukakoshi																			2	21	—
—	(Japan) Naoki Yamamoto																			3	4	—
—	(Japan) Kenta Yamashita																			4		—
—	(Japan) Kamui Kobayashi																			14	5	—
—	(Japan) Sho Tsuboi																			5		—
—	(France) Benoît Tréluyer																			6	10	—
–	(Japan) Daisuke Nakajima																				6	—
—	(Japan) Yuhi Sekiguchi																			7		—
—	(Japan) Ryō Hirakawa																	13			8	—
—	(United Kingdom) Jenson Button																	9	16			—
—	(Japan) Yuji Tachikawa																			9		—
—	(Japan) Hideki Mutoh																			10		—
—	(Japan) Tsugio Matsuda																	NC			11	—
—	(France) Frederic Makowiecki																			11		—
—	(Italy) Ronnie Quintarelli																		17	12		—
—	(Japan) Mitsunori Takaboshi																				12	—
—	(Italy) Alex Zanardi																			Ret	13	—
—	(Finland) Heikki Kovalainen																				14	—
—	(Japan) Takuya Izawa																			15		—
—	(Japan) Kazuya Oshima																				15	—
—	(Japan) Yuichi Nakayama																			16		—
—	(Japan) Yuji Kunimoto																				16	—
—	(United Kingdom) Jann Mardenborough																			17		—
—	(United Kingdom) James Rossiter																				17	—
—	(Japan) Kohei Hirate																				18	—
—	(Japan) Daiki Sasaki																			19		—
—	(Japan) Kazuki Nakajima																				19	—
—	(Japan) Hiroaki Ishiura																				20	—
—	(Japan) Tomoki Nojiri																				22	—
—	(Japan) Tadasuke Makino																			Ret		—
Pos.	Driver	HOC (Germany)		ZOL (Belgium)		MIS (Italy)		NOR (Germany)		ASS (Netherlands)		BRH (United Kingdom)		LAU (Germany)		NÜR (Germany)		HOC (Germany)		FUJ (Japan)		Points

Colour	Result
Gold	Winner
Silver	Second place
Bronze	Third place
Green	Points classification
Blue	Non-points classification
Blue	Non-classified finish (NC)
Purple	Retired, not classified (Ret)
Red	Did not qualify (DNQ)
Red	Did not pre-qualify (DNPQ)
Black	Disqualified (DSQ)
White	Did not start (DNS)
White	Withdrew (WD)
White	Race cancelled (C)
Blank	Did not practice (DNP)
Blank	Did not arrive (DNA)
Blank	Excluded (EX)

**Bold** – Pole
Italics – Fastest Lap
1 – 3 Points for Pole
2 – 2 Points for P2
3 – 1 Point for P3

- † — Driver retired, but was classified as they completed 75% of the winner's race distance.

=== Teams' championship ===
Pos.	Team	Car	HOC (Germany)		ZOL (Belgium)		MIS (Italy)		NOR (Germany)		ASS (Netherlands)		BRH (United Kingdom)		LAU (Germany)		NÜR (Germany)		HOC (Germany)		FUJ (Japan)		Points
1	Audi Sport Team Rosberg	21					11	5															447
1	Audi Sport Team Rosberg	33	16†	1	Ret^{2}	1^{2}	**2**^{1}	**3**^{1}	1^{3}	**7**^{1}	3^{2}	**5**^{1}	2^{2}	**1**^{1}	**Ret**^{1}	1	**1**^{1}	3^{2}	**1**^{1}	3	8	9	447
1	Audi Sport Team Rosberg	53	12	9	6	3			11	2	7	9	11	15	10^{2}	**4**^{1}	6	**1**^{1}	12	5			447
2	Audi Sport Team Abt Sportsline	4	3	3^{3}	12	Ret	Ret	4^{2}	Ret	4	Ret	6	4	3^{3}	2	5	DSQ	2	4	7			407
2	Audi Sport Team Abt Sportsline	51	8	2	3	8	5	1	**2**^{1}	8^{2}	2	3	3	2	1^{3}	2^{3}	15^{3}	6	17	1^{2}			407
2	Audi Sport Team Abt Sportsline	99																			13	7	407
3	Audi Sport Team Phoenix	28	5	Ret	4	11	3^{3}	11	4	6^{3}	8^{3}	11	5^{3}	4^{2}	6	8	5	4	5	10	Ret	3	316
3	Audi Sport Team Phoenix	99	2^{2}	Ret	5	4	6	10	Ret	3	9	1^{3}	7	6	3	3	Ret	7^{3}	3^{3}	**2**^{1}			316
4	BMW Team RMG	7	7	5	10^{3}	7	4	8	5^{2}	1	15	Ret	12	Ret	9	14	2^{2}	10	8	9			308
4	BMW Team RMG	11	**1**^{1}	8^{2}	**7**^{1}	13	1	Ret	8	16†	**1**^{1}	2	**1**^{1}	10	4	6	3	Ret	2^{2}	12			308
5	BMW Team RMR	16	4	6	13	14	10	Ret	Ret	9	5	14	13	12	Ret	15†	9	9	6	4^{3}			202
5	BMW Team RMR	25	14	**4**^{1}	1	2^{3}	7	2	7	5	4	13	6	5	5	10	13	8	Ret	14			202
6	BMW Team RBM	00																			14	5	103
6	BMW Team RBM	4																			Ret	13	103
6	BMW Team RBM	11																			18	12	103
6	BMW Team RBM	31	6	13	11	**5**^{1}	9	9	Ret	Ret	10	15	8	7	16	11	7	16	16	13			103
6	BMW Team RBM	47	13	10	2	10	Ret	6	3	13	16	16†	DNS	Ret	8	13	8	11	10	6			103
7	Audi Sport Team WRT	21	10	15	14	9			Ret	15	11	10	DNS	16	7	9	14	13	15	15			79
7	Audi Sport Team WRT	27	15	14	Ret	12	8^{2}	7^{3}	13	14	6	4^{2}	9	13	14	7^{2}	4	5	14	Ret			79
7	Audi Sport Team WRT	34					12	15															79
8	R-Motorsport I	3	Ret^{3}	7	8	DNS	16	Ret	12	Ret	14	8	14†	14	13	Ret	12	DNS	7	DNS			38
8	R-Motorsport I	76	11	11	Ret	6	15	13	9	12	12	Ret	Ret	9	11	Ret	Ret	14	11	8			38
9	R-Motorsport II	23	9	16†	Ret	Ret	13	14	6	10	Ret	7	10	8	12	12	10	12	Ret	Ret			26
9	R-Motorsport II	62	Ret	12	9	Ret	14	12	10	11	13	12	15†	11	15	Ret	11	15	DNS	11			26
Ineligible to score points
—	Lexus Team KeePer TOM'S	37																	13	Ret	1	8	—
—	Modulo Nakajima Racing	64																			Ret	1	—
—	Keihin Real Racing	17																			2	21	—
—	Team Kunimitsu	1																	9	16	3	4	—
—	Lexus Team LeMans Wako's	6																			4	15	—
—	Lexus Team WedsSport Bandoh	19																			5	16	—
—	Audi Sport Team WRT Hitotsuyama	21																			6	10	—
—	Team Mugen	16																			10	6	—
—	Lexus Team au TOM'S	36																			7	19	—
—	Lexus Team ZENT Cerumo	38																			9	20	—
—	Nismo	23																			12	11	—
—	Nismo	35																	NC	17			—
—	NDDP Racing with B-Max Racing	3																			11	18	—
—	Kondo Racing	24																			17	12	—
—	Lexus Team SARD	39																			16	14	—
—	ARTA	8																			15	22	—
—	Team Impul	12																			19	17	—
Pos.	Team	Car	HOC (Germany)		ZOL (Belgium)		MIS (Italy)		NOR (Germany)		ASS (Netherlands)		BRH (United Kingdom)		LAU (Germany)		NÜR (Germany)		HOC (Germany)		FUJ (Japan)		Points

=== Manufacturers' championship ===
Pos.	Manufacturer	HOC (Germany)		ZOL (Belgium)		MIS (Italy)		NOR (Germany)		ASS (Netherlands)		BRH (United Kingdom)		LAU (Germany)		NÜR (Germany)		HOC (Germany)		Points
1	Audi	49	61	47	58	57	68	58	59	50	68	58	76	72	90	59	76	66	73	1132
2	BMW	54	39	54	39	45	32	38	37	51	18	3	17	28	9	45	7	34	1	550
3	Aston Martin	3	6	6	0 (Note: In accordance with Article 28.5 of the DTM Sporting Regulations, Aston Martin did not accumulate the eight points earned by Jake Dennis towards the manufacturers' championship standings.)	0	0	11	1	0	10	1	6	0	0	1	0	0	4	49
Ineligible to score points
—	Honda																	2	0	—
—	Lexus																	0	0	—
—	Nissan																	0	0	—
Pos.	Manufacturer	HOC (Germany)		ZOL (Belgium)		MIS (Italy)		NOR (Germany)		ASS (Netherlands)		BRH (United Kingdom)		LAU (Germany)		NÜR (Germany)		HOC (Germany)		Points

== Bibliography ==
- Upietz, Tim (13 December 2019). DTM 2019: Das offizielle Jahrbuch. Duisburg: Gruppe C Motorsport Verlag. ISBN 978-3-948501-04-4.
