= 2019 Assen DTM round =

(Netherlands) 2019 DTM Assen round
Event Information
- Round 5 of 9 in the 2019 Deutsche Tourenwagen Masters
- Date: 20–21 July 2019 Deutsche Tourenwagen Masters
- Location: Assen, the Netherlands
- Venue: TT Circuit Assen
- Weather: Saturday: Rain; Sunday: Overcast

Results
Race 1
Distance	31 laps	141.205 km
Pole position	(Germany) Marco Wittmann; BMW Team RMG	1:25.434
Winner	(Germany) Marco Wittmann; BMW Team RMG	1:01:15.672
Race 2
Distance	37 laps	168.535 km
Pole position	(Germany) René Rast; Audi Sport Team Rosberg	1:24.849
Winner	(Germany) Mike Rockenfeller; Audi Sport Team Phoenix	56:44.559

The 2019 DTM Assen round was a motor racing event for the Deutsche Tourenwagen Masters held between 20 and 21 July 2019. The event, part of the 33rd season of the DTM, was held at the TT Circuit Assen in the Netherlands.

== Results ==
=== Race 1 ===
==== Qualifying ====
Pos.	No.	Driver	Team	Car	Time	Gap	Grid	Pts
1	11	(Germany) Marco Wittmann	BMW Team RMG	BMW M4 Turbo DTM	1:25.434		1	3
2	33	(Germany) René Rast	Audi Sport Team Rosberg	Audi RS5 Turbo DTM	1:25.592	+0.158	2	2
3	28	(France) Loïc Duval	Audi Sport Team Phoenix	Audi RS5 Turbo DTM	1:25.749	+0.315	3	1
4	21	(Brazil) Pietro Fittipaldi	Audi Sport Team WRT	Audi RS5 Turbo DTM	1:25.751	+0.317	4	
5	16	(Germany) Timo Glock	BMW Team RMR	BMW M4 Turbo DTM	1:25.853	+0.419	5	
6	51	(Switzerland) Nico Müller	Audi Sport Team Abt	Audi RS5 Turbo DTM	1:25.855	+0.421	6	
7	31	(South Africa) Sheldon van der Linde	BMW Team RBM	BMW M4 Turbo DTM	1:25.856	+0.422	7	
8	7	(Canada) Bruno Spengler	BMW Team RMG	BMW M4 Turbo DTM	1:26.004	+0.570	8	
9	25	(Austria) Philipp Eng	BMW Team RMR	BMW M4 Turbo DTM	1:26.056	+0.622	9	
10	47	(Sweden) Joel Eriksson	BMW Team RBM	BMW M4 Turbo DTM	1:26.210	+0.776	10	
11	27	(South Africa) Jonathan Aberdein	Audi Sport Team WRT	Audi RS5 Turbo DTM	1:26.387	+0.953	11	
12	53	(United Kingdom) Jamie Green	Audi Sport Team Rosberg	Audi RS5 Turbo DTM	1:26.479	+1.045	12	
13	99	(Germany) Mike Rockenfeller	Audi Sport Team Phoenix	Audi RS5 Turbo DTM	1:26.487	+1.053	13	
14	23	(Spain) Daniel Juncadella	R-Motorsport	Aston Martin Vantage DTM	1:26.657	+1.223	14	
15	3	(United Kingdom) Paul di Resta	R-Motorsport	Aston Martin Vantage DTM	1:26.907	+1.473	15	
16	62	(Austria) Ferdinand von Habsburg	R-Motorsport	Aston Martin Vantage DTM	1:27.218	+1.784	16	
17	76	(United Kingdom) Jake Dennis	R-Motorsport	Aston Martin Vantage DTM	1:27.241	+1.807	17	
NC	4	(Netherlands) Robin Frijns	Audi Sport Team Abt	Audi RS5 Turbo DTM	No time		18	

==== Race ====
Pos	No.	Driver	Team	Car	Laps	Time / Retired	Grid	Pts
1	11	(Germany) Marco Wittmann	BMW Team RMG	BMW M4 Turbo DTM	31	1:01:15.672	1	25
2	51	(Switzerland) Nico Müller	Audi Sport Team Abt	Audi RS5 Turbo DTM	31	+3.137	6	18
3	33	(Germany) René Rast	Audi Sport Team Rosberg	Audi RS5 Turbo DTM	31	+8.094	2	15
4	25	(Austria) Philipp Eng	BMW Team RMR	BMW M4 Turbo DTM	31	+25.313	9	12
5	16	(Germany) Timo Glock	BMW Team RMR	BMW M4 Turbo DTM	31	+25.534	5	10
6	27	(South Africa) Jonathan Aberdein	Audi Sport Team WRT	Audi RS5 Turbo DTM	31	+27.887	11	8
7	53	(United Kingdom) Jamie Green	Audi Sport Team Rosberg	Audi RS5 Turbo DTM	31	+36.078	12	6
8	28	(France) Loïc Duval	Audi Sport Team Phoenix	Audi RS5 Turbo DTM	31	+42.496	3	4
9	99	(Germany) Mike Rockenfeller	Audi Sport Team Phoenix	Audi RS5 Turbo DTM	31	+43.656	13	2
10	31	(South Africa) Sheldon van der Linde	BMW Team RBM	BMW M4 Turbo DTM	31	+44.184	7	1
11	21	(Brazil) Pietro Fittipaldi	Audi Sport Team WRT	Audi RS5 Turbo DTM	31	+45.162	4	
12	76	(United Kingdom) Jake Dennis	R-Motorsport	Aston Martin Vantage DTM	31	+45.869	17	
13	62	(Austria) Ferdinand von Habsburg	R-Motorsport	Aston Martin Vantage DTM	31	+48.094	16	
14	3	(United Kingdom) Paul di Resta	R-Motorsport	Aston Martin Vantage DTM	31	+48.917	15	
15	7	(Canada) Bruno Spengler	BMW Team RMG	BMW M4 Turbo DTM	31	+53.378	8	
16	47	(Sweden) Joel Eriksson	BMW Team RBM	BMW M4 Turbo DTM	31	+1:01.197	10	
Ret	4	(Netherlands) Robin Frijns	Audi Sport Team Abt	Audi RS5 Turbo DTM	21	Crash damage	18	
Ret	23	(Spain) Daniel Juncadella	R-Motorsport	Aston Martin Vantage DTM	3	Mechanical	14	
Fastest lap set by Nico Müller: 1:44.598

=== Race 2 ===
==== Qualifying ====
Pos.	No.	Driver	Team	Car	Time	Gap	Grid	Pts
1	33	(Germany) René Rast	Audi Sport Team Rosberg	Audi RS5 Turbo DTM	1:24.849		1	3
2	27	(South Africa) Jonathan Aberdein	Audi Sport Team WRT	Audi RS5 Turbo DTM	1:24.981	+0.132	2	2
3	99	(Germany) Mike Rockenfeller	Audi Sport Team Phoenix	Audi RS5 Turbo DTM	1:25.017	+0.168	3	1
4	51	(Switzerland) Nico Müller	Audi Sport Team Abt	Audi RS5 Turbo DTM	1:25.018	+0.169	4	
5	4	(Netherlands) Robin Frijns	Audi Sport Team Abt	Audi RS5 Turbo DTM	1:25.102	+0.253	5	
6	31	(South Africa) Sheldon van der Linde	BMW Team RBM	BMW M4 Turbo DTM	1:25.147	+0.298	6	
7	28	(France) Loïc Duval	Audi Sport Team Phoenix	Audi RS5 Turbo DTM	1:25.388	+0.539	7	
8	25	(Austria) Philipp Eng	BMW Team RMR	BMW M4 Turbo DTM	1:25.410	+0.561	8	
9	16	(Germany) Timo Glock	BMW Team RMR	BMW M4 Turbo DTM	1:25.468	+0.619	9	
10	21	(Brazil) Pietro Fittipaldi	Audi Sport Team WRT	Audi RS5 Turbo DTM	1:25.485	+0.636	10	
11	47	(Sweden) Joel Eriksson	BMW Team RBM	BMW M4 Turbo DTM	1:25.517	+0.668	11	
12	7	(Canada) Bruno Spengler	BMW Team RMG	BMW M4 Turbo DTM	1:25.750	+0.901	12	
13	53	(United Kingdom) Jamie Green	Audi Sport Team Rosberg	Audi RS5 Turbo DTM	1:25.854	+1.005	13	
14	23	(Spain) Daniel Juncadella	R-Motorsport	Aston Martin Vantage DTM	1:26.087	+1.238	14	
15	3	(United Kingdom) Paul di Resta	R-Motorsport	Aston Martin Vantage DTM	1:26.370	+1.521	15	
16	62	(Austria) Ferdinand von Habsburg	R-Motorsport	Aston Martin Vantage DTM	1:26.566	+1.717	16	
17	76	(United Kingdom) Jake Dennis	R-Motorsport	Aston Martin Vantage DTM	1:27.379	+2.530	17	
NC	11	(Germany) Marco Wittmann	BMW Team RMG	BMW M4 Turbo DTM	No time		18	

==== Race ====
Pos	No.	Driver	Team	Car	Laps	Time / Retired	Grid	Pts
1	99	(Germany) Mike Rockenfeller	Audi Sport Team Phoenix	Audi RS5 Turbo DTM	37	56:44.559	3	25
2	11	(Germany) Marco Wittmann	BMW Team RMG	BMW M4 Turbo DTM	37	+4.518	18	18
3	51	(Switzerland) Nico Müller	Audi Sport Team Abt	Audi RS5 Turbo DTM	37	+6.398	4	15
4	27	(South Africa) Jonathan Aberdein	Audi Sport Team WRT	Audi RS5 Turbo DTM	37	+17.000	2	12
5	33	(Germany) René Rast	Audi Sport Team Rosberg	Audi RS5 Turbo DTM	37	+19.348	1	10
6	4	(Netherlands) Robin Frijns	Audi Sport Team Abt	Audi RS5 Turbo DTM	37	+21.626	5	8
7	23	(Spain) Daniel Juncadella	R-Motorsport	Aston Martin Vantage DTM	37	+21.967	14	6
8	3	(United Kingdom) Paul di Resta	R-Motorsport	Aston Martin Vantage DTM	37	+22.554	15	4
9	53	(United Kingdom) Jamie Green	Audi Sport Team Rosberg	Audi RS5 Turbo DTM	37	+25.946	13	2
10	21	(Brazil) Pietro Fittipaldi	Audi Sport Team WRT	Audi RS5 Turbo DTM	37	+36.096	10	1
11	28	(France) Loïc Duval	Audi Sport Team Phoenix	Audi RS5 Turbo DTM	37	+36.492	7	
12	62	(Austria) Ferdinand von Habsburg	R-Motorsport	Aston Martin Vantage DTM	37	+41.444	16	
13	25	(Austria) Philipp Eng	BMW Team RMR	BMW M4 Turbo DTM	37	+47.996	8	
14	16	(Germany) Timo Glock	BMW Team RMR	BMW M4 Turbo DTM	37	+57.455	9	
15	31	(South Africa) Sheldon van der Linde	BMW Team RBM	BMW M4 Turbo DTM	37	+58.520	6	
16	47	(Sweden) Joel Eriksson	BMW Team RBM	BMW M4 Turbo DTM	29	+8 laps	11	
Ret	7	(Canada) Bruno Spengler	BMW Team RMG	BMW M4 Turbo DTM	19	Mechanical	12	
Ret	76	(United Kingdom) Jake Dennis	R-Motorsport	Aston Martin Vantage DTM	19	Mechanical	17	
Fastest lap set by Marco Wittmann: 1:28.227

== Championship standings ==
Drivers Championship

	Pos	Driver	Pts	Gap
	1	(Germany) René Rast	158	
	2	(Switzerland) Nico Müller	136	-22
2	3	(Germany) Marco Wittmann	118	-40
1	4	(Austria) Philipp Eng	111	-47
1	5	(Germany) Mike Rockenfeller	94	-64

Teams Championship

	Pos	Team	Pts	Gap
	1	(Germany) Audi Sport Team Rosberg (33, 53)	219	
	2	(Germany) Audi Sport Team Abt (4, 51)	201	-18
	3	(Germany) BMW Team RMG (7, 11)	195	-24
	4	(Germany) Audi Sport Team Phoenix (28, 99)	158	-61
1	5	(Belgium) BMW Team RMR (16, 25)	144	-75

Manufacturers Championship

Pos	Drivers	Pts	Gap
1	(Germany) Audi	576	
2	(Germany) BMW	406	-170
3	(United Kingdom) Aston Martin	45	-531

- Note: Only the top five positions are included for three sets of standings.

== See also ==
- 2019 W Series Assen round

Previous race: 2019 Norisring Nürnberg 200 Speedweekend	Deutsche Tourenwagen Masters; 2019 season	Next race: 2019 Brands Hatch DTM round
