= 2019 Nürburgring DTM round =

(Germany) 2019 DTM Nürburg round
Event Information
- Round 8 of 9 in the 2019 Deutsche Tourenwagen Masters
- Date: 14–15 September 2019 Deutsche Tourenwagen Masters
- Location: Nürburg, Germany
- Venue: Nürburgring
- Weather: Saturday: Fine; Sunday: Fine

Results
Race 1
Distance	41 laps	148.379 km
Pole position	(Germany) René Rast; Audi Sport Team Rosberg	1:19.642
Winner	(Germany) René Rast; Audi Sport Team Rosberg	57:29.693
Race 2
Distance	41 laps	148.379 km
Pole position	(United Kingdom) Jamie Green; Audi Sport Team Rosberg	1:20.032
Winner	(United Kingdom) Jamie Green; Audi Sport Team Rosberg	57:41.767

The 2019 DTM Nürburg round was a motor racing event for the Deutsche Tourenwagen Masters held between 14 and 15 September 2019. The event, part of the 33rd season of the DTM, was held at the Nürburgring in Germany.

René Rast secured his second drivers' championship following his third-place finish in the second race, with his closest rival Nico Müller exactly an event's worth of points behind. Given that Rast had an insurmountable number of wins, even if Müller had managed to close the gap he would still have lost the title on a count-back.

== Results ==
=== Race 1 ===
==== Qualifying ====
Pos.	No.	Driver	Team	Car	Time	Gap	Grid	Pts
1	33	(Germany) René Rast	Audi Sport Team Rosberg	Audi RS5 Turbo DTM	1:19.642		1	3
2	7	(Canada) Bruno Spengler	BMW Team RMG	BMW M4 Turbo DTM	1:19.822	+0.180	2	2
3	51	(Switzerland) Nico Müller	Audi Sport Team Abt	Audi RS5 Turbo DTM	1:19.908	+0.266	3	1
4	99	(Germany) Mike Rockenfeller	Audi Sport Team Phoenix	Audi RS5 Turbo DTM	1:19.914	+0.272	4	
5	27	(South Africa) Jonathan Aberdein	Audi Sport Team WRT	Audi RS5 Turbo DTM	1:19.943	+0.301	5	
6	31	(South Africa) Sheldon van der Linde	BMW Team RBM	BMW M4 Turbo DTM	1:20.108	+0.466	6	
7	16	(Germany) Timo Glock	BMW Team RMR	BMW M4 Turbo DTM	1:20.141	+0.499	7	
8	28	(France) Loïc Duval	Audi Sport Team Phoenix	Audi RS5 Turbo DTM	1:20.177	+0.535	8	
9	53	(United Kingdom) Jamie Green	Audi Sport Team Rosberg	Audi RS5 Turbo DTM	1:20.196	+0.554	9	
10	4	(Netherlands) Robin Frijns	Audi Sport Team Abt	Audi RS5 Turbo DTM	1:20.215	+0.573	10	
11	11	(Germany) Marco Wittmann	BMW Team RMG	BMW M4 Turbo DTM	1:20.468	+0.826	11	
12	21	(Brazil) Pietro Fittipaldi	Audi Sport Team WRT	Audi RS5 Turbo DTM	1:20.485	+0.843	15^{1}	
13	3	(United Kingdom) Paul di Resta	R-Motorsport	Aston Martin Vantage DTM	1:20.502	+0.860	12	
14	47	(Sweden) Joel Eriksson	BMW Team RBM	BMW M4 Turbo DTM	1:20.559	+0.917	13	
15	23	(Spain) Daniel Juncadella	R-Motorsport	Aston Martin Vantage DTM	1:20.750	+1.108	14	
16	62	(Austria) Ferdinand von Habsburg	R-Motorsport	Aston Martin Vantage DTM	1:25.139	+5.497	16	
DSQ	25	(Austria) Philipp Eng	BMW Team RMR	BMW M4 Turbo DTM	–		17	
DSQ	76	(United Kingdom) Jake Dennis	R-Motorsport	Aston Martin Vantage DTM	–		18	

- ^1 – Car #21 received a three-place grid penalty.

==== Race ====
Pos	No.	Driver	Team	Car	Laps	Time / Retired	Grid	Pts
1	33	(Germany) René Rast	Audi Sport Team Rosberg	Audi RS5 Turbo DTM	41	57:29.693	1	25
2	7	(Canada) Bruno Spengler	BMW Team RMG	BMW M4 Turbo DTM	41	+10.787	2	18
3	11	(Germany) Marco Wittmann	BMW Team RMG	BMW M4 Turbo DTM	41	+17.299	11	15
4	27	(South Africa) Jonathan Aberdein	Audi Sport Team WRT	Audi RS5 Turbo DTM	41	+24.537	5	12
5	28	(France) Loïc Duval	Audi Sport Team Phoenix	Audi RS5 Turbo DTM	41	+27.158	8	10
6	53	(United Kingdom) Jamie Green	Audi Sport Team Rosberg	Audi RS5 Turbo DTM	41	+27.338	9	8
7	31	(South Africa) Sheldon van der Linde	BMW Team RBM	BMW M4 Turbo DTM	41	+27.650	6	6
8	47	(Sweden) Joel Eriksson	BMW Team RBM	BMW M4 Turbo DTM	41	+27.880	13	4
9	16	(Germany) Timo Glock	BMW Team RMR	BMW M4 Turbo DTM	41	+30.924	7	2
10	23	(Spain) Daniel Juncadella	R-Motorsport	Aston Martin Vantage DTM	41	+32.590	14	1
11	62	(Austria) Ferdinand von Habsburg	R-Motorsport	Aston Martin Vantage DTM	41	+38.344	16	
12	3	(United Kingdom) Paul di Resta	R-Motorsport	Aston Martin Vantage DTM	41	+42.114	12	
13	25	(Austria) Philipp Eng	BMW Team RMR	BMW M4 Turbo DTM	41	+45.746	17	
14	21	(Brazil) Pietro Fittipaldi	Audi Sport Team WRT	Audi RS5 Turbo DTM	41	+1:04.566	15	
15	51	(Switzerland) Nico Müller	Audi Sport Team Abt	Audi RS5 Turbo DTM	41	+1:09.161	3	
DSQ	4	(Netherlands) Robin Frijns	Audi Sport Team Abt	Audi RS5 Turbo DTM	41	Disqualified	10	
Ret	99	(Germany) Mike Rockenfeller	Audi Sport Team Phoenix	Audi RS5 Turbo DTM	25	Mechanical	4	
Ret	76	(United Kingdom) Jake Dennis	R-Motorsport	Aston Martin Vantage DTM	25	Mechanical	18	
Fastest lap set by René Rast: 1:21.358

=== Race 2 ===
==== Qualifying ====
Pos.	No.	Driver	Team	Car	Time	Gap	Grid	Pts
1	53	(United Kingdom) Jamie Green	Audi Sport Team Rosberg	Audi RS5 Turbo DTM	1:20.032		1	3
2	33	(Germany) René Rast	Audi Sport Team Rosberg	Audi RS5 Turbo DTM	1:20.033	+0.001	2	2
3	99	(Germany) Mike Rockenfeller	Audi Sport Team Phoenix	Audi RS5 Turbo DTM	1:20.107	+0.075	3	1
4	4	(Netherlands) Robin Frijns	Audi Sport Team Abt	Audi RS5 Turbo DTM	1:20.122	+0.090	4	
5	27	(South Africa) Jonathan Aberdein	Audi Sport Team WRT	Audi RS5 Turbo DTM	1:20.171	+0.139	5	
6	28	(France) Loïc Duval	Audi Sport Team Phoenix	Audi RS5 Turbo DTM	1:20.220	+0.188	6	
7	16	(Germany) Timo Glock	BMW Team RMR	BMW M4 Turbo DTM	1:20.270	+0.238	7	
8	11	(Germany) Marco Wittmann	BMW Team RMG	BMW M4 Turbo DTM	1:20.312	+0.280	8	
9	7	(Canada) Bruno Spengler	BMW Team RMG	BMW M4 Turbo DTM	1:20.317	+0.285	9	
10	31	(South Africa) Sheldon van der Linde	BMW Team RBM	BMW M4 Turbo DTM	1:20.342	+0.310	10	
11	25	(Austria) Philipp Eng	BMW Team RMR	BMW M4 Turbo DTM	1:20.344	+0.312	11	
12	21	(Brazil) Pietro Fittipaldi	Audi Sport Team WRT	Audi RS5 Turbo DTM	1:20.445	+0.413	12	
13	47	(Sweden) Joel Eriksson	BMW Team RBM	BMW M4 Turbo DTM	1:20.489	+0.457	13	
14	51	(Switzerland) Nico Müller	Audi Sport Team Abt	Audi RS5 Turbo DTM	1:20.495	+0.463	14	
15	62	(Austria) Ferdinand von Habsburg	R-Motorsport	Aston Martin Vantage DTM	1:20.633	+0.601	15	
16	23	(Spain) Daniel Juncadella	R-Motorsport	Aston Martin Vantage DTM	1:20.946	+0.914	16	
17	76	(United Kingdom) Jake Dennis	R-Motorsport	Aston Martin Vantage DTM	1:21.061	+1.029	17	
NC	3	(United Kingdom) Paul di Resta	R-Motorsport	Aston Martin Vantage DTM	No time		18	

==== Race ====
Pos	No.	Driver	Team	Car	Laps	Time / Retired	Grid	Pts
1	53	(United Kingdom) Jamie Green	Audi Sport Team Rosberg	Audi RS5 Turbo DTM	41	57:41.767	1	25
2	4	(Netherlands) Robin Frijns	Audi Sport Team Abt	Audi RS5 Turbo DTM	41	+0.442	4	18
3	33	(Germany) René Rast	Audi Sport Team Rosberg	Audi RS5 Turbo DTM	41	+5.827	2	15
4	28	(France) Loïc Duval	Audi Sport Team Phoenix	Audi RS5 Turbo DTM	41	+10.813	6	12
5	27	(South Africa) Jonathan Aberdein	Audi Sport Team WRT	Audi RS5 Turbo DTM	41	+11.121	5	10
6	51	(Switzerland) Nico Müller	Audi Sport Team Abt	Audi RS5 Turbo DTM	41	+12.410	14	8
7	99	(Germany) Mike Rockenfeller	Audi Sport Team Phoenix	Audi RS5 Turbo DTM	41	+12.753	3	6
8	25	(Austria) Philipp Eng	BMW Team RMR	BMW M4 Turbo DTM	41	+19.886	11	4
9	16	(Germany) Timo Glock	BMW Team RMR	BMW M4 Turbo DTM	41	+27.159	7	2
10	7	(Canada) Bruno Spengler	BMW Team RMG	BMW M4 Turbo DTM	41	+27.675	9	1
11	47	(Sweden) Joel Eriksson	BMW Team RBM	BMW M4 Turbo DTM	41	+29.974	13	
12	23	(Spain) Daniel Juncadella	R-Motorsport	Aston Martin Vantage DTM	41	+30.660	16	
13	21	(Brazil) Pietro Fittipaldi	Audi Sport Team WRT	Audi RS5 Turbo DTM	41	+31.625	12	
14	76	(United Kingdom) Jake Dennis	R-Motorsport	Aston Martin Vantage DTM	41	+32.000	17	
15	62	(Austria) Ferdinand von Habsburg	R-Motorsport	Aston Martin Vantage DTM	41	+32.449	15	
16	31	(South Africa) Sheldon van der Linde	BMW Team RBM	BMW M4 Turbo DTM	41	+51.534	10	
Ret	11	(Germany) Marco Wittmann	BMW Team RMG	BMW M4 Turbo DTM	29	Mechanical	8	
DNS	3	(United Kingdom) Paul di Resta	R-Motorsport	Aston Martin Vantage DTM	0		18	
Fastest lap set by René Rast: 1:22.253

== Championship standings ==
Drivers Championship

	Pos	Driver	Pts	Gap
	1	(Germany) René Rast	279	
	2	(Switzerland) Nico Müller	223	-56
	3	(Germany) Marco Wittmann	182	-93
1	4	(Germany) Mike Rockenfeller	145	-134
1	5	(Austria) Philipp Eng	144	-135

Teams Championship

	Pos	Team	Pts	Gap
1	1	(Germany) Audi Sport Team Rosberg (33, 53)	394	
1	2	(Germany) Audi Sport Team Abt (4, 51)	362	-32
	3	(Germany) BMW Team RMG (7, 11)	282	-112
	4	(Germany) Audi Sport Team Phoenix (28, 99)	268	-126
	5	(Belgium) BMW Team RMR (16, 25)	181	-213

Manufacturers Championship

Pos	Drivers	Pts	Gap
1	(Germany) Audi	993	
2	(Germany) BMW	515	-478
3	(United Kingdom) Aston Martin	45	-948

- Note: Only the top five positions are included for three sets of standings.

Previous race: 2019 Lausitzring DTM round	Deutsche Tourenwagen Masters; 2019 season	Next race: 2019 DTM Hockenheim Final
