= 2019 Norisring Nürnberg 200 Speedweekend =

Motor racing event

(Germany) 2019 Norisring Nürnberg 200 Speedweekend
Event Information
- Round 4 of 9 in the 2019 Deutsche Tourenwagen Masters
- Date: 6–7 July 2019 Deutsche Tourenwagen Masters
- Location: Nuremberg, Germany
- Venue: Norisring
- Weather: Saturday: Sunny; Sunday: Overcast

Results
Race 1
Distance	69 laps	158.700 km
Pole position	(Switzerland) Nico Müller; Audi Sport Team Abt	46.337
Winner	(Germany) René Rast; Audi Sport Team Rosberg	57:31.554
Race 2
Distance	70 laps	161.000 km
Pole position	(Germany) René Rast; Audi Sport Team Rosberg	46.146
Winner	(Canada) Bruno Spengler; BMW Team RMG	56:15.610

The 2019 Norisring Nürnberg 200 Speedweekend (official name: ADAC Norisring Nürnberg 200 Speedweekend 2019) was a motor racing event for the Deutsche Tourenwagen Masters (DTM) held between 6 and 7 July 2019. The event, part of the 33rd season of the DTM and also 53rd annual running of Norisring Nürnberg 200 Speedweekend was held at the Norisring in Germany.

== Background ==
Jamie Green returned to the Audi Sport Team Rosberg seat having successfully undergone surgery to remove his appendix. His Misano replacement, Pietro Fittipaldi, subsequently returned to his regular seat at Audi Sport Team WRT.

== Results ==
=== Race 1 ===
==== Qualifying ====
Pos.	No.	Driver	Team	Car	Time	Gap	Grid	Pts
1	51	(Switzerland) Nico Müller	Audi Sport Team Abt	Audi RS5 Turbo DTM	46.337		1	3
2	25	(Austria) Philipp Eng	BMW Team RMR	BMW M4 Turbo DTM	46.412	+0.075	5^{1}	2
3	7	(Canada) Bruno Spengler	BMW Team RMG	BMW M4 Turbo DTM	46.492	+0.155	2	1
4	33	(Germany) René Rast	Audi Sport Team Rosberg	Audi RS5 Turbo DTM	46.524	+0.187	3	
5	47	(Sweden) Joel Eriksson	BMW Team RBM	BMW M4 Turbo DTM	46.527	+0.190	4	
6	11	(Germany) Marco Wittmann	BMW Team RMG	BMW M4 Turbo DTM	46.532	+0.195	6	
7	27	(South Africa) Jonathan Aberdein	Audi Sport Team WRT	Audi RS5 Turbo DTM	46.617	+0.280	7	
8	53	(United Kingdom) Jamie Green	Audi Sport Team Rosberg	Audi RS5 Turbo DTM	46.728	+0.391	8	
9	4	(Netherlands) Robin Frijns	Audi Sport Team Abt	Audi RS5 Turbo DTM	46.782	+0.445	9	
10	31	(South Africa) Sheldon van der Linde	BMW Team RBM	BMW M4 Turbo DTM	46.813	+0.476	10	
11	23	(Spain) Daniel Juncadella	R-Motorsport	Aston Martin Vantage DTM	46.893	+0.556	11	
12	16	(Germany) Timo Glock	BMW Team RMR	BMW M4 Turbo DTM	46.898	+0.561	12	
13	21	(Brazil) Pietro Fittipaldi	Audi Sport Team WRT	Audi RS5 Turbo DTM	47.029	+0.692	13	
14	3	(United Kingdom) Paul di Resta	R-Motorsport	Aston Martin Vantage DTM	47.125	+0.788	14	
15	62	(Austria) Ferdinand von Habsburg	R-Motorsport	Aston Martin Vantage DTM	47.221	+0.884	15	
16	76	(United Kingdom) Jake Dennis	R-Motorsport	Aston Martin Vantage DTM	47.276	+0.939	16	
NC	28	(France) Loïc Duval	Audi Sport Team Phoenix	Audi RS5 Turbo DTM	No time		17	
NC	99	(Germany) Mike Rockenfeller	Audi Sport Team Phoenix	Audi RS5 Turbo DTM	No time		18	

^1 – Car #25 was given a three-place grid penalty for blocking another car.

==== Race ====
Pos	No.	Driver	Team	Car	Laps	Time / Retired	Grid	Pts
1	33	(Germany) René Rast	Audi Sport Team Rosberg	Audi RS5 Turbo DTM	69	57:31.554	3	25
2	51	(Switzerland) Nico Müller	Audi Sport Team Abt	Audi RS5 Turbo DTM	69	+34.498	1	18
3	47	(Sweden) Joel Eriksson	BMW Team RBM	BMW M4 Turbo DTM	69	+34.692	4	15
4	28	(France) Loïc Duval	Audi Sport Team Phoenix	Audi RS5 Turbo DTM	69	+39.521	17	12
5	7	(Canada) Bruno Spengler	BMW Team RMG	BMW M4 Turbo DTM	69	+42.111	2	10
6	23	(Spain) Daniel Juncadella	R-Motorsport	Aston Martin Vantage DTM	69	+43.581	11	8
7	25	(Austria) Philipp Eng	BMW Team RMR	BMW M4 Turbo DTM	69	+45.357	5	6
8	11	(Germany) Marco Wittmann	BMW Team RMG	BMW M4 Turbo DTM	69	+48.526	6	4
9	76	(United Kingdom) Jake Dennis	R-Motorsport	Aston Martin Vantage DTM	68	+1 Lap	16	2
10	62	(Austria) Ferdinand von Habsburg	R-Motorsport	Aston Martin Vantage DTM	68	+1 Lap	15	1
11	53	(United Kingdom) Jamie Green	Audi Sport Team Rosberg	Audi RS5 Turbo DTM	68	+1 Lap	8	
12	3	(United Kingdom) Paul di Resta	R-Motorsport	Aston Martin Vantage DTM	67	+2 Laps	14	
13	27	(South Africa) Jonathan Aberdein	Audi Sport Team WRT	Audi RS5 Turbo DTM	66	+3 Laps	7	
Ret	31	(South Africa) Sheldon van der Linde	BMW Team RBM	BMW M4 Turbo DTM	31	Crash damage	10	
Ret	4	(Netherlands) Robin Frijns	Audi Sport Team Abt	Audi RS5 Turbo DTM	28	Mechanical	9	
Ret	99	(Germany) Mike Rockenfeller	Audi Sport Team Phoenix	Audi RS5 Turbo DTM	25	Mechanical	18	
Ret	16	(Germany) Timo Glock	BMW Team RMR	BMW M4 Turbo DTM	9	Crash	12	
Ret	21	(Brazil) Pietro Fittipaldi	Audi Sport Team WRT	Audi RS5 Turbo DTM	1	Crash	13	
Fastest lap set by Nico Müller: 47.391

=== Race 2 ===
==== Qualifying ====
Pos.	No.	Driver	Team	Car	Time	Gap	Grid	Pts
1	33	(Germany) René Rast	Audi Sport Team Rosberg	Audi RS5 Turbo DTM	46.146		1	3
2	53	(United Kingdom) Jamie Green	Audi Sport Team Rosberg	Audi RS5 Turbo DTM	46.153	+0.007	7^{1}	2
3	51	(Switzerland) Nico Müller	Audi Sport Team Abt	Audi RS5 Turbo DTM	46.153	+0.007	2	1
4	28	(France) Loïc Duval	Audi Sport Team Phoenix	Audi RS5 Turbo DTM	46.186	+0.040	3	
5	25	(Austria) Philipp Eng	BMW Team RMR	BMW M4 Turbo DTM	46.192	+0.046	4	
6	99	(Germany) Mike Rockenfeller	Audi Sport Team Phoenix	Audi RS5 Turbo DTM	46.257	+0.111	11^{1}	
7	7	(Canada) Bruno Spengler	BMW Team RMG	BMW M4 Turbo DTM	46.373	+0.227	5	
8	31	(South Africa) Sheldon van der Linde	BMW Team RBM	BMW M4 Turbo DTM	46.490	+0.344	6	
9	11	(Germany) Marco Wittmann	BMW Team RMG	BMW M4 Turbo DTM	46.514	+0.368	8	
10	27	(South Africa) Jonathan Aberdein	Audi Sport Team WRT	Audi RS5 Turbo DTM	46.564	+0.418	9	
11	4	(Netherlands) Robin Frijns	Audi Sport Team Abt	Audi RS5 Turbo DTM	46.591	+0.445	10	
12	47	(Sweden) Joel Eriksson	BMW Team RBM	BMW M4 Turbo DTM	46.604	+0.458	12	
13	23	(Spain) Daniel Juncadella	R-Motorsport	Aston Martin Vantage DTM	46.712	+0.566	13	
14	3	(United Kingdom) Paul di Resta	R-Motorsport	Aston Martin Vantage DTM	46.745	+0.599	14	
15	62	(Austria) Ferdinand von Habsburg	R-Motorsport	Aston Martin Vantage DTM	46.750	+0.604	15	
16	21	(Brazil) Pietro Fittipaldi	Audi Sport Team WRT	Audi RS5 Turbo DTM	46.777	+0.631	16	
17	76	(United Kingdom) Jake Dennis	R-Motorsport	Aston Martin Vantage DTM	46.950	+0.804	18^{1}	
18	16	(Germany) Timo Glock	BMW Team RMR	BMW M4 Turbo DTM	51.883	+5.737	17	

^1 – Cars #53, #76 and #99 were each given a five-place grid penalty for not respecting red flag procedure.

==== Race ====
Pos	No.	Driver	Team	Car	Laps	Time / Retired	Grid	Pts
1	7	(Canada) Bruno Spengler	BMW Team RMG	BMW M4 Turbo DTM	70	56:15.610	5	25
2	53	(United Kingdom) Jamie Green	Audi Sport Team Rosberg	Audi RS5 Turbo DTM	70	+5.765	7	18
3	99	(Germany) Mike Rockenfeller	Audi Sport Team Phoenix	Audi RS5 Turbo DTM	70	+6.833	11	15
4	4	(Netherlands) Robin Frijns	Audi Sport Team Abt	Audi RS5 Turbo DTM	70	+11.695	10	12
5	25	(Austria) Philipp Eng	BMW Team RMR	BMW M4 Turbo DTM	70	+16.365	4	10
6	28	(France) Loïc Duval	Audi Sport Team Phoenix	Audi RS5 Turbo DTM	70	+17.590	3	8
7	33	(Germany) René Rast	Audi Sport Team Rosberg	Audi RS5 Turbo DTM	70	+25.480	1	6
8	51	(Switzerland) Nico Müller	Audi Sport Team Abt	Audi RS5 Turbo DTM	70	+29.080	2	4
9	16	(Germany) Timo Glock	BMW Team RMR	BMW M4 Turbo DTM	70	+33.536	17	2
10	23	(Spain) Daniel Juncadella	R-Motorsport	Aston Martin Vantage DTM	70	+37.941	13	1
11	62	(Austria) Ferdinand von Habsburg	R-Motorsport	Aston Martin Vantage DTM	70	+39.516	15	
12	76	(United Kingdom) Jake Dennis	R-Motorsport	Aston Martin Vantage DTM	69	+1 Lap	18	
13	47	(Sweden) Joel Eriksson	BMW Team RBM	BMW M4 Turbo DTM	69	+1 Lap	12	
14	27	(South Africa) Jonathan Aberdein	Audi Sport Team WRT	Audi RS5 Turbo DTM	69	+1 Lap	9	
15	21	(Brazil) Pietro Fittipaldi	Audi Sport Team WRT	Audi RS5 Turbo DTM	68	+2 Laps	16	
16	11	(Germany) Marco Wittmann	BMW Team RMG	BMW M4 Turbo DTM	64	+6 Laps	8	
Ret	31	(South Africa) Sheldon van der Linde	BMW Team RBM	BMW M4 Turbo DTM	51	Mechanical	6	
Ret	3	(United Kingdom) Paul di Resta	R-Motorsport	Aston Martin Vantage DTM	44	Mechanical	14	
Fastest lap set by Nico Müller: 46.618

== Championship standings ==
Drivers Championship

	Pos	Driver	Pts	Gap
	1	(Germany) René Rast	127	
1	2	(Switzerland) Nico Müller	102	-25
1	3	(Austria) Philipp Eng	101	-26
3	4	(Canada) Bruno Spengler	76	-51
1	5	(Germany) Marco Wittmann	72	-55

Teams Championship

	Pos	Team	Pts	Gap
	1	(Germany) Audi Sport Team Rosberg (33, 53)	182	
	2	(Germany) Audi Sport Team Abt (4, 51)	159	-23
	3	(Germany) BMW Team RMG (7, 11)	148	-34
	4	(Belgium) BMW Team RMR (16, 25)	124	-58
1	4	(Germany) Audi Sport Team Phoenix (28, 99)	124	-58

Manufacturers Championship

Pos	Drivers	Pts	Gap
1	(Germany) Audi	467	
2	(Germany) BMW	338	-129
3	(United Kingdom) Aston Martin	27	-440

- Note: Only the top five positions are included for three sets of standings.

== See also ==
- 2019 W Series Nuremberg round

Previous race: 2019 Misano DTM round	Deutsche Tourenwagen Masters; 2019 season	Next race: 2019 Assen DTM round
