= 2019 2nd Hockenheim DTM round =

(Germany) 2019 DTM Hockenheim Final
Event Information
- Round 9 of 9 in the 2019 Deutsche Tourenwagen Masters
- Date: 5–6 October 2019 Deutsche Tourenwagen Masters
- Location: Hockenheim, Germany
- Venue: Hockenheimring
- Weather: Saturday: Overcast; Sunday: Rain

Results
Race 1
Distance	38 laps	173.812 km
Pole position	(Germany) René Rast; Audi Sport Team Rosberg	1:45.552
Winner	(Germany) René Rast; Audi Sport Team Rosberg	1:01:00.948
Race 2
Distance	27 laps	123.498 km
Pole position	(Switzerland) Nico Müller; Audi Sport Team Abt	1:50.813
Winner	(Switzerland) Nico Müller; Audi Sport Team Abt	1:04:45.023

The 2019 DTM Hockenheim Final is a motor racing event for the Deutsche Tourenwagen Masters held between 5 and 6 October 2019. The event, part of the 33rd season of the DTM, was held at the Hockenheimring in Germany.

== Background ==
The final round of the DTM for 2019 was a dead rubber as far as the drivers' and manufacturers' championships were concerned, having already been won by René Rast and Audi respectively. The teams' championship however was far from resolved, as 32 points separated Audi squads Team Rosberg and Abt Sportsline with a potential 96 on offer.

Three guest entries from the Super GT Series' GT500 class were accepted into the race ahead of the Japanese series' adoption of the Class One Touring Car regulations used by DTM for 2020. One entry from each of the series' three manufacturers – Honda, Lexus and Nissan – made the trip, and were accompanied by five drivers; former Formula One World Champion Jenson Button would contest both races for Honda, Nick Cassidy and Ryō Hirakawa would contest a race each for Lexus and the same approach was taken by Nissan for their entry, fielding Tsugio Matsuda and Ronnie Quintarelli.

== Results ==
=== Race 1 ===
==== Qualifying ====
Pos.	No.	Driver	Team	Car	Time	Gap	Grid	Pts
1	33	(Germany) René Rast	Audi Sport Team Rosberg	Audi RS5 Turbo DTM	1:45.552		1	3
2	11	(Germany) Marco Wittmann	BMW Team RMG	BMW M4 Turbo DTM	1:45.679	+0.127	2	2
3	99	(Germany) Mike Rockenfeller	Audi Sport Team Phoenix	Audi RS5 Turbo DTM	1:45.783	+0.231	3	1
4	27	(South Africa) Jonathan Aberdein	Audi Sport Team WRT	Audi RS5 Turbo DTM	1:45.928	+0.376	4	
5	28	(France) Loïc Duval	Audi Sport Team Phoenix	Audi RS5 Turbo DTM	1:45.939	+0.387	5	
6	1	(United Kingdom) Jenson Button	Team Kunimitsu	Honda NSX-GT	1:46.206	+0.654	6	
7	16	(Germany) Timo Glock	BMW Team RMR	BMW M4 Turbo DTM	1:46.315	+0.763	7	
8	4	(Netherlands) Robin Frijns	Audi Sport Team Abt	Audi RS5 Turbo DTM	1:46.351	+0.799	8	
9	31	(South Africa) Sheldon van der Linde	BMW Team RBM	BMW M4 Turbo DTM	1:46.383	+0.831	9	
10	47	(Sweden) Joel Eriksson	BMW Team RBM	BMW M4 Turbo DTM	1:46.628	+1.076	10	
11	51	(Switzerland) Nico Müller	Audi Sport Team Abt	Audi RS5 Turbo DTM	1:46.789	+1.237	11	
12	62	(Austria) Ferdinand von Habsburg	R-Motorsport	Aston Martin Vantage DTM	1:46.791	+1.239	12	
13	23	(Spain) Daniel Juncadella	R-Motorsport	Aston Martin Vantage DTM	1:46.986	+1.434	13	
14	76	(United Kingdom) Jake Dennis	R-Motorsport	Aston Martin Vantage DTM	1:46.988	+1.436	14	
15	7	(Canada) Bruno Spengler	BMW Team RMG	BMW M4 Turbo DTM	1:47.026	+1.474	15	
16	3	(United Kingdom) Paul di Resta	R-Motorsport	Aston Martin Vantage DTM	1:47.090	+1.538	16	
17	25	(Austria) Philipp Eng	BMW Team RMR	BMW M4 Turbo DTM	1:47.548	+1.996	17	
18	53	(United Kingdom) Jamie Green	Audi Sport Team Rosberg	Audi RS5 Turbo DTM	1:47.590	+2.038	18	
19	21	(Brazil) Pietro Fittipaldi	Audi Sport Team WRT	Audi RS5 Turbo DTM	1:47.792	+2.240	19	
20	37	(Japan) Ryō Hirakawa	Lexus Team KeePer TOM'S	Lexus LC500 GT500	1:49.181	+3.629	20	
21	35	(Japan) Tsugio Matsuda	Nismo	Nissan GT-R Nismo GT500	1:49.349	+3.797	21	

==== Race ====
Pos	No.	Driver	Team	Car	Laps	Time / Retired	Grid	Pts
1	33	(Germany) René Rast	Audi Sport Team Rosberg	Audi RS5 Turbo DTM	38	1:01:00.948	1	25
2	11	(Germany) Marco Wittmann	BMW Team RMG	BMW M4 Turbo DTM	38	+1.693	2	18
3	99	(Germany) Mike Rockenfeller	Audi Sport Team Phoenix	Audi RS5 Turbo DTM	38	+10.697	3	15
4	4	(Netherlands) Robin Frijns	Audi Sport Team Abt	Audi RS5 Turbo DTM	38	+17.795	8	12
5	28	(France) Loïc Duval	Audi Sport Team Phoenix	Audi RS5 Turbo DTM	38	+24.224	5	10
6	16	(Germany) Timo Glock	BMW Team RMR	BMW M4 Turbo DTM	38	+25.760	7	8
7	3	(United Kingdom) Paul di Resta	R-Motorsport	Aston Martin Vantage DTM	38	+26.439	16	6
8	7	(Canada) Bruno Spengler	BMW Team RMG	BMW M4 Turbo DTM	38	+27.270	15	4
9	1	(United Kingdom) Jenson Button	Team Kunimitsu	Honda NSX-GT	38	+31.492	6	(Note: Jenson Button and Team Kunimitsu were a guest entry and therefore ineligible for points.)
10	47	(Sweden) Joel Eriksson	BMW Team RBM	BMW M4 Turbo DTM	38	+31.868	10	2
11	76	(United Kingdom) Jake Dennis	R-Motorsport	Aston Martin Vantage DTM	38	+37.997	14	1
12	53	(United Kingdom) Jamie Green	Audi Sport Team Rosberg	Audi RS5 Turbo DTM	38	+38.442	18	
13	37	(Japan) Ryō Hirakawa	Lexus Team KeePer TOM'S	Lexus LC500 GT500	38	+40.958	20	
14	27	(South Africa) Jonathan Aberdein	Audi Sport Team WRT	Audi RS5 Turbo DTM	38	+46.931	4	
15	21	(Brazil) Pietro Fittipaldi	Audi Sport Team WRT	Audi RS5 Turbo DTM	38	+59.196	19	
16	31	(South Africa) Sheldon van der Linde	BMW Team RBM	BMW M4 Turbo DTM	38	+59.602	9	
17	51	(Switzerland) Nico Müller	Audi Sport Team Abt	Audi RS5 Turbo DTM	38	+1:01.596	11	
NC	35	(Japan) Tsugio Matsuda	Nismo	Nissan GT-R Nismo GT500	21	+17 Laps	21	
Ret	23	(Spain) Daniel Juncadella	R-Motorsport	Aston Martin Vantage DTM	20	Mechanical	13	
Ret	25	(Austria) Philipp Eng	BMW Team RMR	BMW M4 Turbo DTM	17	Mechanical	17	
DNS	62	(Austria) Ferdinand von Habsburg	R-Motorsport	Aston Martin Vantage DTM	0		12	
Fastest lap set by Nico Müller: 1:30.927

=== Race 2 ===
==== Qualifying ====
Pos.	No.	Driver	Team	Car	Time	Gap	Grid	Pts
1	99	(Germany) Mike Rockenfeller	Audi Sport Team Phoenix	Audi RS5 Turbo DTM	1:50.800		6^{1}	3
2	51	(Switzerland) Nico Müller	Audi Sport Team Abt	Audi RS5 Turbo DTM	1:50.813	+0.013	1	2
3	16	(Germany) Timo Glock	BMW Team RMR	BMW M4 Turbo DTM	1:51.260	+0.460	2	1
4	53	(United Kingdom) Jamie Green	Audi Sport Team Rosberg	Audi RS5 Turbo DTM	1:51.391	+0.591	3	
5	47	(Sweden) Joel Eriksson	BMW Team RBM	BMW M4 Turbo DTM	1:51.489	+0.689	4	
6	11	(Germany) Marco Wittmann	BMW Team RMG	BMW M4 Turbo DTM	1:51.788	+0.988	5	
7	25	(Austria) Philipp Eng	BMW Team RMR	BMW M4 Turbo DTM	1:51.807	+1.007	7	
8	33	(Germany) René Rast	Audi Sport Team Rosberg	Audi RS5 Turbo DTM	1:51.873	+1.073	8	
9	4	(Netherlands) Robin Frijns	Audi Sport Team Abt	Audi RS5 Turbo DTM	1:51.990	+1.190	9	
10	28	(France) Loïc Duval	Audi Sport Team Phoenix	Audi RS5 Turbo DTM	1:51.994	+1.194	10	
11	76	(United Kingdom) Jake Dennis	R-Motorsport	Aston Martin Vantage DTM	1:52.242	+1.442	11	
12	62	(Austria) Ferdinand von Habsburg	R-Motorsport	Aston Martin Vantage DTM	1:52.374	+1.574	12	
13	27	(South Africa) Jonathan Aberdein	Audi Sport Team WRT	Audi RS5 Turbo DTM	1:52.483	+1.683	13	
14	7	(Canada) Bruno Spengler	BMW Team RMG	BMW M4 Turbo DTM	1:52.491	+1.691	14	
15	31	(South Africa) Sheldon van der Linde	BMW Team RBM	BMW M4 Turbo DTM	1:52.511	+1.711	15	
16	37	(New Zealand) Nick Cassidy	Lexus Team KeePer TOM'S	Lexus LC500 GT500	1:52.527	+1.727	16	
17	3	(United Kingdom) Paul di Resta	R-Motorsport	Aston Martin Vantage DTM	1:52.534	+1.734	17	
18	23	(Spain) Daniel Juncadella	R-Motorsport	Aston Martin Vantage DTM	1:52.652	+1.852	18	
19	1	(United Kingdom) Jenson Button	Team Kunimitsu	Honda NSX-GT	1:52.787	+1.987	19	
20	35	(Italy) Ronnie Quintarelli	Nismo	Nissan GT-R Nismo GT500	1:53.875	+3.075	20	
NC	21	(Brazil) Pietro Fittipaldi	Audi Sport Team WRT	Audi RS5 Turbo DTM	No time		21	

- ^1 – Car #99 received a five-place grid penalty for continual track limits abuse.

==== Race ====
Pos	No.	Driver	Team	Car	Laps	Time / Retired	Grid	Pts
1	51	(Switzerland) Nico Müller	Audi Sport Team Abt	Audi RS5 Turbo DTM	27	1:04:45.023	1	25
2	99	(Germany) Mike Rockenfeller	Audi Sport Team Phoenix	Audi RS5 Turbo DTM	27	+3.835	6	18
3	33	(Germany) René Rast	Audi Sport Team Rosberg	Audi RS5 Turbo DTM	27	+8.403	8	15
4	16	(Germany) Timo Glock	BMW Team RMR	BMW M4 Turbo DTM	27	+11.849	2	12
5	53	(United Kingdom) Jamie Green	Audi Sport Team Rosberg	Audi RS5 Turbo DTM	27	+13.094	3	10
6	47	(Sweden) Joel Eriksson	BMW Team RBM	BMW M4 Turbo DTM	27	+16.248	4	8
7	4	(Netherlands) Robin Frijns	Audi Sport Team Abt	Audi RS5 Turbo DTM	27	+22.172	9	6
8	76	(United Kingdom) Jake Dennis	R-Motorsport	Aston Martin Vantage DTM	27	+36.954	11	4
9	7	(Canada) Bruno Spengler	BMW Team RMG	BMW M4 Turbo DTM	27	+51.319	14	2
10	28	(France) Loïc Duval	Audi Sport Team Phoenix	Audi RS5 Turbo DTM	27	+55.877	10	1
11	62	(Austria) Ferdinand von Habsburg	R-Motorsport	Aston Martin Vantage DTM	27	+58.838	12	
12	11	(Germany) Marco Wittmann	BMW Team RMG	BMW M4 Turbo DTM	27	+59.767	5	
13	31	(South Africa) Sheldon van der Linde	BMW Team RBM	BMW M4 Turbo DTM	27	+1:00.417	15	
14	25	(Austria) Philipp Eng	BMW Team RMR	BMW M4 Turbo DTM	27	+1:01.873	7	
15	21	(Brazil) Pietro Fittipaldi	Audi Sport Team WRT	Audi RS5 Turbo DTM	27	+1:30.051	21	
16	1	(United Kingdom) Jenson Button	Team Kunimitsu	Honda NSX-GT	27	+1:55.243	19	
17	35	(Italy) Ronnie Quintarelli	Nismo	Nissan GT-R Nismo GT500	26	+1 Lap	20	
Ret	27	(South Africa) Jonathan Aberdein	Audi Sport Team WRT	Audi RS5 Turbo DTM	14	Mechanical	13	
Ret	37	(New Zealand) Nick Cassidy	Lexus Team KeePer TOM'S	Lexus LC500 GT500	1	Accident	16	
Ret	23	(Spain) Daniel Juncadella	R-Motorsport	Aston Martin Vantage DTM	1	Fire	18	
DNS	3	(United Kingdom) Paul di Resta	R-Motorsport	Aston Martin Vantage DTM	0		17	
Fastest lap set by Mike Rockenfeller: 1:52.014

== Championship standings ==
Drivers Championship

	Pos	Driver	Pts	Gap
	1	(Germany) René Rast	322	
	2	(Switzerland) Nico Müller	250	-72
	3	(Germany) Marco Wittmann	202	-120
	4	(Germany) Mike Rockenfeller	182	-140
1	5	(Netherlands) Robin Frijns	157	-165

Teams Championship

	Pos	Team	Pts	Gap
	1	(Germany) Audi Sport Team Rosberg (33, 53)	447	
	2	(Germany) Audi Sport Team Abt (4, 51)	407	-40
1	3	(Germany) Audi Sport Team Phoenix (28, 99)	316	-131
1	4	(Germany) BMW Team RMG (7, 11)	308	-139
	5	(Belgium) BMW Team RMR (16, 25)	202	-245

Manufacturers Championship

Pos	Drivers	Pts	Gap
1	(Germany) Audi	1132	
2	(Germany) BMW	550	-582
3	(United Kingdom) Aston Martin	49	-1083

- Note: Only the top five positions are included for three sets of standings.

== Footnotes ==
Previous race: 2019 Nürburgring DTM round	Deutsche Tourenwagen Masters; 2019 season	Next race: Non-Championship: 2019 Super GT x DTM Dream Race; Championship: 2020 DTM Spa-Francorchamps round
