= 2019 Brands Hatch DTM round =

(United Kingdom) 2019 DTM Brands Hatch round
Event Information
- Round 6 of 9 in the 2019 Deutsche Tourenwagen Masters
- Date: 9–11 August 2019 Deutsche Tourenwagen Masters
- Location: West Kingsdown, England, United Kingdom
- Venue: Brands Hatch
- Weather: Saturday: Overcast; Sunday: Clear

Results
Race 1
Distance	42 laps	164.472 km
Pole position	(Germany) Marco Wittmann; BMW Team RMG	1:15.654
Winner	(Germany) Marco Wittmann; BMW Team RMG	56:39.275
Race 2
Distance	42 laps	164.472 km
Pole position	(Germany) René Rast; Audi Sport Team Rosberg	1:15.134
Winner	(Germany) René Rast; Audi Sport Team Rosberg	57:28.564

The 2019 DTM Brands Hatch round was a motor racing event for the Deutsche Tourenwagen Masters held between 9 and 11 August 2019. The event, part of the 33rd season of the DTM, was held at Brands Hatch in the United Kingdom.

== Results ==
=== Race 1 ===
==== Qualifying ====
Pos.	No.	Driver	Team	Car	Time	Gap	Grid	Pts
1	11	(Germany) Marco Wittmann	BMW Team RMG	BMW M4 Turbo DTM	1:15.654		1	3
2	33	(Germany) René Rast	Audi Sport Team Rosberg	Audi RS5 Turbo DTM	1:15.723	+0.069	2	2
3	28	(France) Loïc Duval	Audi Sport Team Phoenix	Audi RS5 Turbo DTM	1:16.012	+0.358	3	1
4	3	(United Kingdom) Paul di Resta	R-Motorsport	Aston Martin Vantage DTM	1:16.067	+0.413	4	
5	4	(Netherlands) Robin Frijns	Audi Sport Team Abt	Audi RS5 Turbo DTM	1:16.249	+0.595	5	
6	31	(South Africa) Sheldon van der Linde	BMW Team RBM	BMW M4 Turbo DTM	1:16.304	+0.650	6	
7	76	(United Kingdom) Jake Dennis	R-Motorsport	Aston Martin Vantage DTM	1:16.342	+0.688	7	
8	51	(Switzerland) Nico Müller	Audi Sport Team Abt	Audi RS5 Turbo DTM	1:16.365	+0.711	8	
9	16	(Germany) Timo Glock	BMW Team RMR	BMW M4 Turbo DTM	1:16.384	+0.730	9	
10	23	(Spain) Daniel Juncadella	R-Motorsport	Aston Martin Vantage DTM	1:16.533	+0.879	10	
11	25	(Austria) Philipp Eng	BMW Team RMR	BMW M4 Turbo DTM	1:16.541	+0.887	11	
12	99	(Germany) Mike Rockenfeller	Audi Sport Team Phoenix	Audi RS5 Turbo DTM	1:16.600	+0.946	12	
13	53	(United Kingdom) Jamie Green	Audi Sport Team Rosberg	Audi RS5 Turbo DTM	1:16.675	+1.021	13	
14	7	(Canada) Bruno Spengler	BMW Team RMG	BMW M4 Turbo DTM	1:17.087	+1.433	14	
15	62	(Austria) Ferdinand von Habsburg	R-Motorsport	Aston Martin Vantage DTM	1:17.510	+1.856	15	
16	21	(Brazil) Pietro Fittipaldi	Audi Sport Team WRT	Audi RS5 Turbo DTM	1:27.390	+11.736	WD^{1}	
NC	47	(Sweden) Joel Eriksson	BMW Team RBM	BMW M4 Turbo DTM	No time		16	
NC	27	(South Africa) Jonathan Aberdein	Audi Sport Team WRT	Audi RS5 Turbo DTM	No time		17	

- ^1 – Car #21 suffered terminal damage during qualifying and was withdrawn from the opening race

==== Race ====
Pos	No.	Driver	Team	Car	Laps	Time / Retired	Grid	Pts
1	11	(Germany) Marco Wittmann	BMW Team RMG	BMW M4 Turbo DTM	42	56:39.275	1	25
2	33	(Germany) René Rast	Audi Sport Team Rosberg	Audi RS5 Turbo DTM	42	+0.374	2	18
3	51	(Switzerland) Nico Müller	Audi Sport Team Abt	Audi RS5 Turbo DTM	42	+8.566	8	15
4	4	(Netherlands) Robin Frijns	Audi Sport Team Abt	Audi RS5 Turbo DTM	42	+15.646	5	12
5	28	(France) Loïc Duval	Audi Sport Team Phoenix	Audi RS5 Turbo DTM	42	+18.236	3	10
6	25	(Austria) Philipp Eng	BMW Team RMR	BMW M4 Turbo DTM	42	+18.813	11	8
7	99	(Germany) Mike Rockenfeller	Audi Sport Team Phoenix	Audi RS5 Turbo DTM	42	+20.056	12	6
8	31	(South Africa) Sheldon van der Linde	BMW Team RBM	BMW M4 Turbo DTM	42	+29.909	6	4
9	27	(South Africa) Jonathan Aberdein	Audi Sport Team WRT	Audi RS5 Turbo DTM	42	+37.087	17	2
10	23	(Spain) Daniel Juncadella	R-Motorsport	Aston Martin Vantage DTM	42	+37.385	10	1
11	53	(United Kingdom) Jamie Green	Audi Sport Team Rosberg	Audi RS5 Turbo DTM	42	+48.996	13	
12	7	(Canada) Bruno Spengler	BMW Team RMG	BMW M4 Turbo DTM	42	+52.465	14	
13	16	(Germany) Timo Glock	BMW Team RMR	BMW M4 Turbo DTM	42	+1:05.237	9	
14	3	(United Kingdom) Paul di Resta	R-Motorsport	Aston Martin Vantage DTM	39	+3 laps	4	
15	62	(Austria) Ferdinand von Habsburg	R-Motorsport	Aston Martin Vantage DTM	38	+4 laps	15	
Ret	76	(United Kingdom) Jake Dennis	R-Motorsport	Aston Martin Vantage DTM	1	Crash damage	7	
DNS	47	(Sweden) Joel Eriksson	BMW Team RBM	BMW M4 Turbo DTM	0	Mechanical	16	
DNS	21	(Brazil) Pietro Fittipaldi	Audi Sport Team WRT	Audi RS5 Turbo DTM		Withdrawn		
Fastest lap set by Philipp Eng: 1:17.862

=== Race 2 ===
==== Qualifying ====
Pos.	No.	Driver	Team	Car	Time	Gap	Grid	Pts
1	33	(Germany) René Rast	Audi Sport Team Rosberg	Audi RS5 Turbo DTM	1:15.134		1	3
2	28	(France) Loïc Duval	Audi Sport Team Phoenix	Audi RS5 Turbo DTM	1:15.432	+0.298	2	2
3	4	(Netherlands) Robin Frijns	Audi Sport Team Abt	Audi RS5 Turbo DTM	1:15.834	+0.700	3	1
4	53	(United Kingdom) Jamie Green	Audi Sport Team Rosberg	Audi RS5 Turbo DTM	1:15.919	+0.785	4	
5	99	(Germany) Mike Rockenfeller	Audi Sport Team Phoenix	Audi RS5 Turbo DTM	1:15.959	+0.825	5	
6	51	(Switzerland) Nico Müller	Audi Sport Team Abt	Audi RS5 Turbo DTM	1:15.968	+0.834	6	
7	21	(Brazil) Pietro Fittipaldi	Audi Sport Team WRT	Audi RS5 Turbo DTM	1:16.015	+0.881	7	
8	27	(South Africa) Jonathan Aberdein	Audi Sport Team WRT	Audi RS5 Turbo DTM	1:16.016	+0.882	8	
9	25	(Austria) Philipp Eng	BMW Team RMR	BMW M4 Turbo DTM	1:16.175	+1.041	9	
10	23	(Spain) Daniel Juncadella	R-Motorsport	Aston Martin Vantage DTM	1:16.257	+1.123	10	
11	16	(Germany) Timo Glock	BMW Team RMR	BMW M4 Turbo DTM	1:16.274	+1.140	11	
12	11	(Germany) Marco Wittmann	BMW Team RMG	BMW M4 Turbo DTM	1:16.296	+1.162	12	
13	31	(South Africa) Sheldon van der Linde	BMW Team RBM	BMW M4 Turbo DTM	1:16.396	+1.262	13	
14	47	(Sweden) Joel Eriksson	BMW Team RBM	BMW M4 Turbo DTM	1:16.425	+1.291	14	
15	3	(United Kingdom) Paul di Resta	R-Motorsport	Aston Martin Vantage DTM	1:16.710	+1.576	15	
16	7	(Canada) Bruno Spengler	BMW Team RMG	BMW M4 Turbo DTM	1:16.715	+1.581	16	
17	76	(United Kingdom) Jake Dennis	R-Motorsport	Aston Martin Vantage DTM	1:16.805	+1.671	17	
18	62	(Austria) Ferdinand von Habsburg	R-Motorsport	Aston Martin Vantage DTM	1:16.997	+1.863	18	

==== Race ====
Pos	No.	Driver	Team	Car	Laps	Time / Retired	Grid	Pts
1	33	(Germany) René Rast	Audi Sport Team Rosberg	Audi RS5 Turbo DTM	42	57:28.564	1	25
2	51	(Switzerland) Nico Müller	Audi Sport Team Abt	Audi RS5 Turbo DTM	42	+0.240	6	18
3	4	(Netherlands) Robin Frijns	Audi Sport Team Abt	Audi RS5 Turbo DTM	42	+0.598	3	15
4	28	(France) Loïc Duval	Audi Sport Team Phoenix	Audi RS5 Turbo DTM	42	+2.362	2	12
5	25	(Austria) Philipp Eng	BMW Team RMR	BMW M4 Turbo DTM	42	+2.889	9	10
6	99	(Germany) Mike Rockenfeller	Audi Sport Team Phoenix	Audi RS5 Turbo DTM	42	+3.523	5	8
7	31	(South Africa) Sheldon van der Linde	BMW Team RBM	BMW M4 Turbo DTM	42	+4.789	13	6
8	23	(Spain) Daniel Juncadella	R-Motorsport	Aston Martin Vantage DTM	42	+5.229	10	4
9	76	(United Kingdom) Jake Dennis	R-Motorsport	Aston Martin Vantage DTM	42	+6.193	17	2
10	11	(Germany) Marco Wittmann	BMW Team RMG	BMW M4 Turbo DTM	42	+7.837	12	1
11	62	(Austria) Ferdinand von Habsburg	R-Motorsport	Aston Martin Vantage DTM	42	+12.091	18	
12	16	(Germany) Timo Glock	BMW Team RMR	BMW M4 Turbo DTM	42	+20.594	11	
13	27	(South Africa) Jonathan Aberdein	Audi Sport Team WRT	Audi RS5 Turbo DTM	42	+27.882	8	
14	3	(United Kingdom) Paul di Resta	R-Motorsport	Aston Martin Vantage DTM	42	+35.392	17	
15	53	(United Kingdom) Jamie Green	Audi Sport Team Rosberg	Audi RS5 Turbo DTM	42	+51.851	4	
16	21	(Brazil) Pietro Fittipaldi	Audi Sport Team WRT	Audi RS5 Turbo DTM	42	+55.065	7	
Ret	7	(Canada) Bruno Spengler	BMW Team RMG	BMW M4 Turbo DTM	21	Mechanical	16	
Ret	47	(Sweden) Joel Eriksson	BMW Team RBM	BMW M4 Turbo DTM	20	Mechanical	14	
Fastest lap set by Timo Glock: 1:18.186

== Championship standings ==
Drivers Championship

Pos	Driver	Pts	Gap
1	(Germany) René Rast	206	
2	(Switzerland) Nico Müller	169	-37
3	(Germany) Marco Wittmann	147	-59
4	(Austria) Philipp Eng	129	-77
5	(Germany) Mike Rockenfeller	108	-98

Teams Championship

Pos	Team	Pts	Gap
1	(Germany) Audi Sport Team Rosberg (33, 53)	267	
2	(Germany) Audi Sport Team Abt (4, 51)	262	-5
3	(Germany) BMW Team RMG (7, 11)	224	-43
4	(Germany) Audi Sport Team Phoenix (28, 99)	197	-70
5	(Belgium) BMW Team RMR (16, 25)	162	-105

Manufacturers Championship

Pos	Drivers	Pts	Gap
1	(Germany) Audi	710	
2	(Germany) BMW	426	-284
3	(United Kingdom) Aston Martin	42	-668

- Note: Only the top five positions are included for three sets of standings.

== See also ==
- 2019 W Series Brands Hatch round

Previous race: 2019 Assen DTM round	Deutsche Tourenwagen Masters; 2019 season	Next race: 2019 Lausitz DTM round
