= Team RMG =

(Germany) BMW Team RMG
- Founded: 2010
- Founder(s): Stefan Reinhold
- Base: Andernach, Rhineland-Palatinate
- Former series: Deutsche Tourenwagen Masters
- Teams' Championships: 2 (2014 and 2016)
- Drivers' Championships: 2 (2014 and 2016)

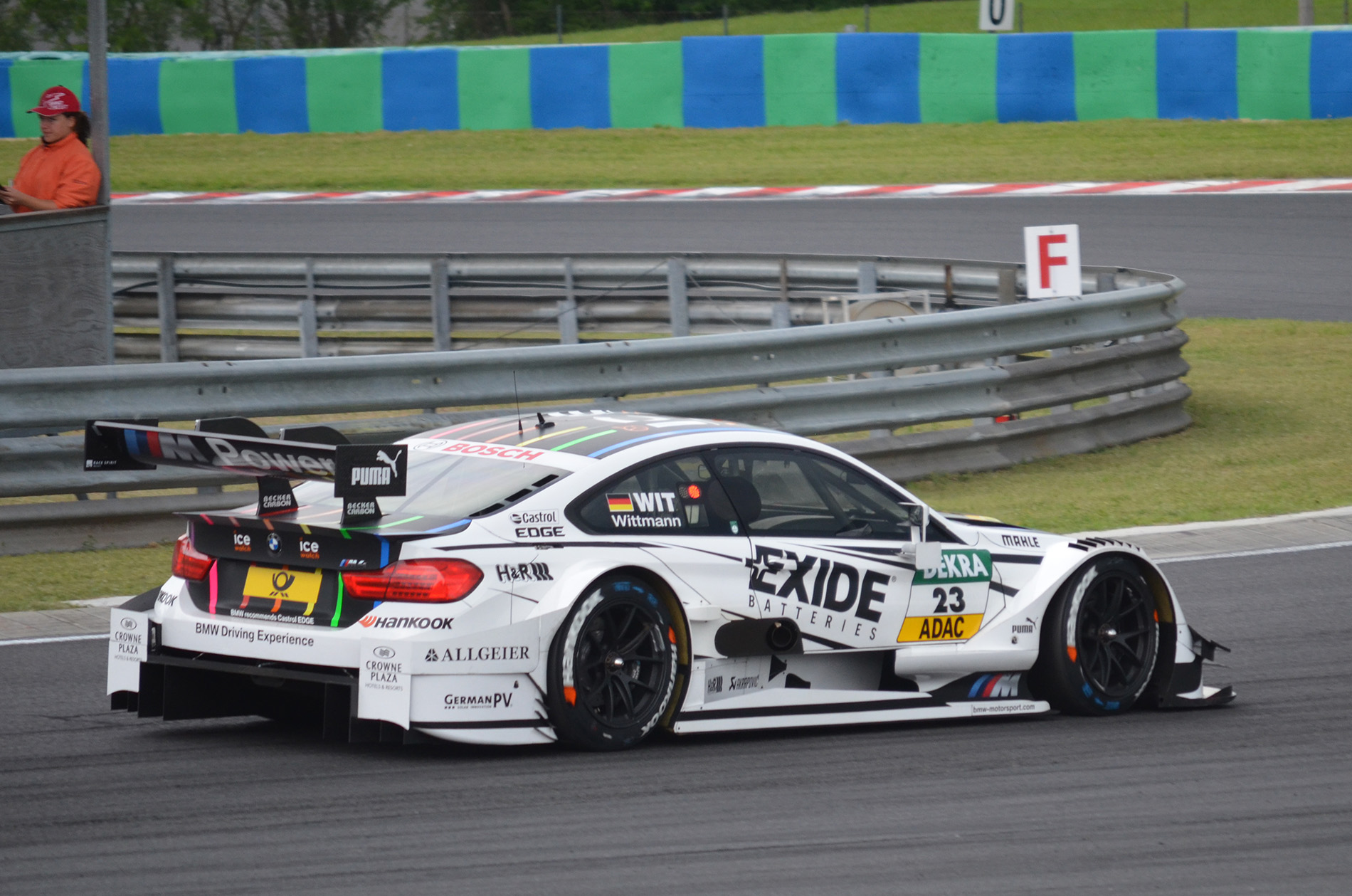
Marco Wittmann at the 2014 Hungarian DTM race

Team RMG better known as BMW Team RMG, is a German racing team founded in late 2010 by Stefan Reinhold, in order to race in the DTM in 2012, also coinciding with BMW return to the championship after 20 Years of absence from the championship, despite being a team build from the scratch, they signed 26 employees and many others for the 2012 season, with many previously worked for various racing teams, in 2012 the debut year of the team, Martin Tomczyk the reigning DTM champion from 2011 signed with BMW and he was placed in RMG, while Joey Hand the first American driver to race in a factory squad in the DTM and member from the BMW American Le Mans Series team, was also placed in the team.

The 2012 started strongly for the team with Tomczyk scoring podium finishes at the Red Bull Ring in Austria, at Norisring and in the Nürburgring, however he retired in the next three races and finished 14th in Hockenheimring, while Hand scored points in the Red Bull Ring and in the final race of the season in Hockenheimring ending the year with 6 points, while Tomczyk scored 69 points in the season, scoring three less from his championship year. (The DTM put in place a new points system in the 2012 season). For 2013 Tomczyk will continue with the team while Hand is now placed in BMW Team RBM, Former 3-time World Touring Car Championship champions driver Andy Priaulx has replaced Hand in Team RMG.

The team is based in Niederzissen, in former Zakspeed headquarters also near the Nürburgring.

On 8 August 2024, it was announced that Team RMG and BMW M Motorsport would part ways at the end of the 2024 season.

== Complete Deutsche Tourenwagen Masters results ==
(key)

Year	Entrant	Car	No	Driver	1	2	3	4	5	6	7	8	9	10	Pos	Points
2012	BMW Team RMG	BMW M3 DTM	1	(Germany) Martin Tomczyk	HOC; Ret	LAU; 7	BRH; 4	SPL; 2	NOR; 2	NÜR; 3	ZAN; Ret	OSC; Ret	VAL; Ret	HOC; 14	8th	69
2012	BMW Team RMG	BMW M3 DTM	2	(United States) Joey Hand	HOC; 13	LAU; 14	BRH; 13	SPL; 9	NOR; 14	NÜR; 18	ZAN; 14	OSC; 11	VAL; 15†	HOC; 8	20th	6
2013	BMW Team RMG	BMW M3 DTM	15	(Germany) Martin Tomczyk	HOC; 13	BRH; 14	SPL; Ret	LAU; 19	NOR; Ret	MSC; 17	NÜR; 5	OSC; 20†	ZAN; 11	HOC; 19	19th	10
2013	BMW Team RMG	BMW M3 DTM	16	(United Kingdom) Andy Priaulx	HOC; 17†	BRH; 19	SPL; 19	LAU; 22	NOR; 9	MSC; 20	NÜR; 16	OSC; 19	ZAN; 19	HOC; 6	20th	10
2014	BMW Team RMG	BMW M4 DTM	23	(Germany) Marco Wittmann	HOC; 1	OSC; 19	HUN; 1	NOR; 6	MSC; 4	SPL; 1	NÜR; 1	LAU; 6	ZAN; 2	HOC; 5	1st	156
2014	BMW Team RMG	BMW M4 DTM	23	(Belgium) Maxime Martin	HOC; 20	OSC; 14	HUN; 6	NOR; 17	MSC; 1	SPL; 15	NÜR; 7	LAU; 14	ZAN; 6	HOC; Ret	7th	47

* Season still in progress. ^{†} Driver did not finish, but completed 75% of the race distance.
