= 2014 Deutsche Tourenwagen Masters =

Touring car championship

Champions
- Drivers' Champion: Marco Wittmann
- Teams' Champion: Team RMG
- Manufacturers' Championship: Audi

Seasons
- ← 2013 2015 →

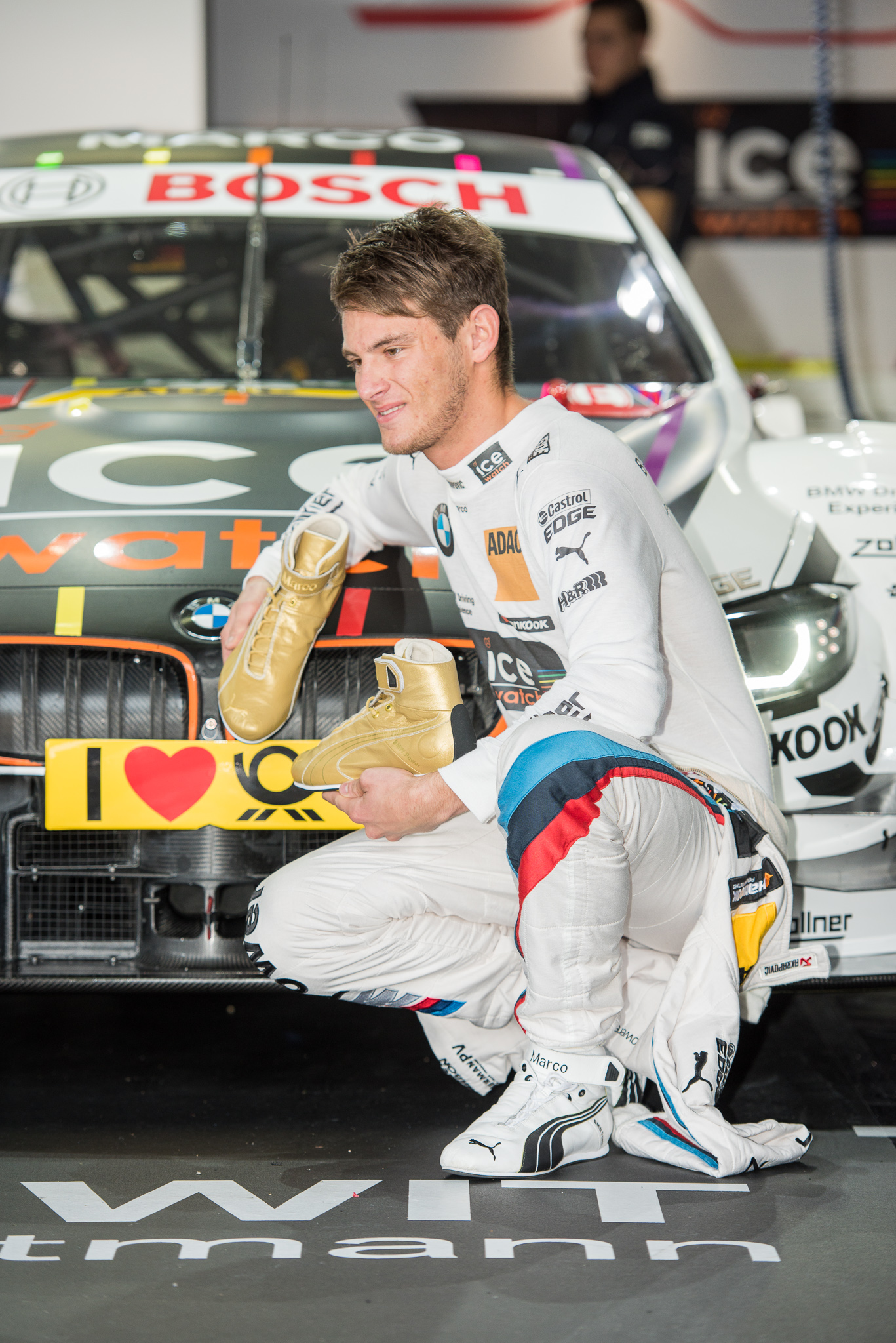
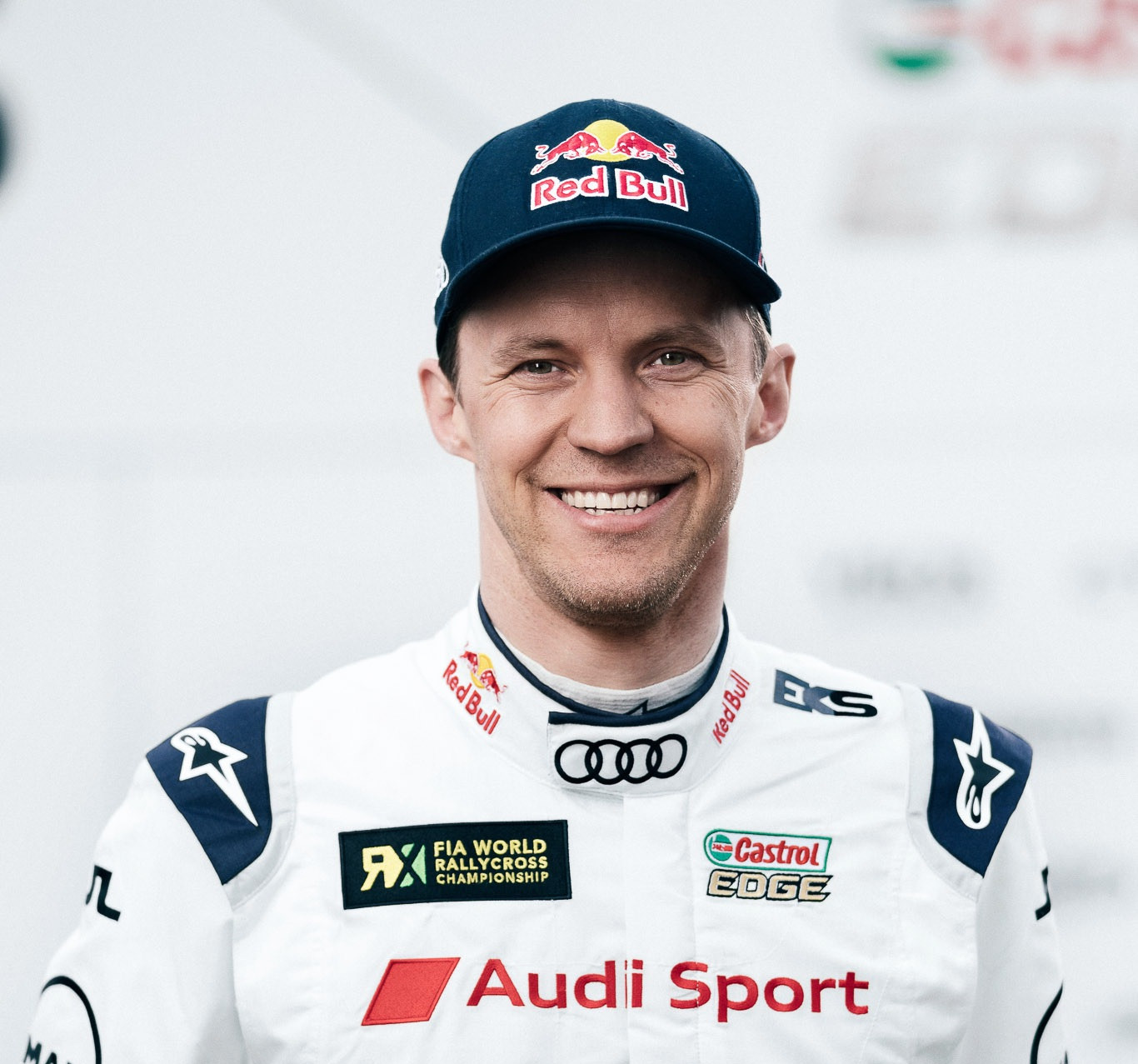
Marco Wittmann (left) won his first Drivers' Championship while Mattias Ekström (right) finished second in the championship.

The 2014 Deutsche Tourenwagen Masters was the twenty-eighth season of premier German touring car championship and also fifteenth season under the moniker of Deutsche Tourenwagen Masters since the series' resumption in 2000. The season started on 4 May at Hockenheim, and ended on 19 October at the same venue, after a total of ten rounds.

In his second season in the series, BMW Team RMG driver Marco Wittmann became champion after his consistent finishes throughout the season left him with a comfortable 50-point winning margin. Wittmann took his first series victory in the opening race at Hockenheim, and quickly added a second victory at the Hungaroring. He also won back-to-back races at the Red Bull Ring and the Nürburgring, before clinching the title at Lausitzring. Mattias Ekström finished the season as runner-up for Audi Sport Team Abt Sportsline, winning the season's final two races at Zandvoort and Hockenheim – Audi's only victories of the 2014 season. Another Audi driver clinched third in the championship, as defending champion Mike Rockenfeller finished in the position for Audi Sport Team Phoenix; he took three second places during the year, but went winless. Other drivers to take victories were Wittmann's team-mate Maxime Martin at Moscow Raceway, with HWA triumvirate Robert Wickens (Norisring), Christian Vietoris (Oschersleben) and Pascal Wehrlein (Lausitzring) taking victories for Mercedes; for Vietoris and Wehrlein, it was their first in the series.

It was also the last season of the single-legged race format before it was replaced by the two-legged DTM race format for the following season (with both races held on Saturday and Sunday).

== Calendar ==
A provisional ten-round calendar was announced on 16 October 2013.

In July, it was announced that the Chinese round – originally scheduled for 28 September on a temporary street circuit in Guangzhou – was cancelled, as the modifications necessary for erecting the circuit proved to be far more extensive than first planned. As a result, a replacement round was scheduled for the same weekend, held at Zandvoort in the Netherlands.

Round	Circuit	Date	Maps
1	(Germany) Hockenheimring, Baden-Württemberg	4 May	2014 Deutsche Tourenwagen Masters is located in Germany 2014 Deutsche Tourenwagen Masters is located in Netherlands 2014 Deutsche Tourenwagen Masters is located in Austria 2014 Deutsche Tourenwagen Masters is located in Hungary 2014 Deutsche Tourenwagen Masters is located in European Russia
2	(Germany) Motorsport Arena Oschersleben, Saxony-Anhalt	18 May	2014 Deutsche Tourenwagen Masters is located in Germany 2014 Deutsche Tourenwagen Masters is located in Netherlands 2014 Deutsche Tourenwagen Masters is located in Austria 2014 Deutsche Tourenwagen Masters is located in Hungary 2014 Deutsche Tourenwagen Masters is located in European Russia
3	(Hungary) Hungaroring, Mogyoród	1 June	2014 Deutsche Tourenwagen Masters is located in Germany 2014 Deutsche Tourenwagen Masters is located in Netherlands 2014 Deutsche Tourenwagen Masters is located in Austria 2014 Deutsche Tourenwagen Masters is located in Hungary 2014 Deutsche Tourenwagen Masters is located in European Russia
4	(Germany) Norisring, Nuremberg	29 June	2014 Deutsche Tourenwagen Masters is located in Germany 2014 Deutsche Tourenwagen Masters is located in Netherlands 2014 Deutsche Tourenwagen Masters is located in Austria 2014 Deutsche Tourenwagen Masters is located in Hungary 2014 Deutsche Tourenwagen Masters is located in European Russia
5	(Russia) Moscow Raceway, Volokolamsk	13 July	2014 Deutsche Tourenwagen Masters is located in Germany 2014 Deutsche Tourenwagen Masters is located in Netherlands 2014 Deutsche Tourenwagen Masters is located in Austria 2014 Deutsche Tourenwagen Masters is located in Hungary 2014 Deutsche Tourenwagen Masters is located in European Russia
6	(Austria) Red Bull Ring, Spielberg	3 August	2014 Deutsche Tourenwagen Masters is located in Germany 2014 Deutsche Tourenwagen Masters is located in Netherlands 2014 Deutsche Tourenwagen Masters is located in Austria 2014 Deutsche Tourenwagen Masters is located in Hungary 2014 Deutsche Tourenwagen Masters is located in European Russia
7	(Germany) Nürburgring, Rhineland-Palatinate	17 August	2014 Deutsche Tourenwagen Masters is located in Germany 2014 Deutsche Tourenwagen Masters is located in Netherlands 2014 Deutsche Tourenwagen Masters is located in Austria 2014 Deutsche Tourenwagen Masters is located in Hungary 2014 Deutsche Tourenwagen Masters is located in European Russia
8	(Germany) Lausitzring, Brandenburg	14 September	2014 Deutsche Tourenwagen Masters is located in Germany 2014 Deutsche Tourenwagen Masters is located in Netherlands 2014 Deutsche Tourenwagen Masters is located in Austria 2014 Deutsche Tourenwagen Masters is located in Hungary 2014 Deutsche Tourenwagen Masters is located in European Russia
9	(Netherlands) Circuit Park Zandvoort, North Holland	28 September	2014 Deutsche Tourenwagen Masters is located in Germany 2014 Deutsche Tourenwagen Masters is located in Netherlands 2014 Deutsche Tourenwagen Masters is located in Austria 2014 Deutsche Tourenwagen Masters is located in Hungary 2014 Deutsche Tourenwagen Masters is located in European Russia
10	(Germany) Hockenheimring, Baden-Württemberg	19 October	2014 Deutsche Tourenwagen Masters is located in Germany 2014 Deutsche Tourenwagen Masters is located in Netherlands 2014 Deutsche Tourenwagen Masters is located in Austria 2014 Deutsche Tourenwagen Masters is located in Hungary 2014 Deutsche Tourenwagen Masters is located in European Russia

== Teams and drivers ==
The following manufacturers, teams and drivers competed in the 2014 Deutsche Tourenwagen Masters. All teams competed with tyres supplied by Hankook.

Manufacturer	Car	Team	No.	Drivers	Rounds
Audi	Audi RS5 DTM	(Germany) Audi Sport Team Phoenix	1	(Germany) Mike Rockenfeller	All
Audi	Audi RS5 DTM	(Germany) Audi Sport Team Phoenix	2	(Germany) Timo Scheider	All
Audi	Audi RS5 DTM	(Germany) Audi Sport Team Abt Sportsline	7	(Sweden) Mattias Ekström	All
Audi	Audi RS5 DTM	(Germany) Audi Sport Team Abt Sportsline	8	(Spain) Miguel Molina	All
Audi	Audi RS5 DTM	(Germany) Audi Sport Team Abt	15	(Italy) Edoardo Mortara	All
Audi	Audi RS5 DTM	(Germany) Audi Sport Team Abt	16	(France) Adrien Tambay	All
Audi	Audi RS5 DTM	(Germany) Audi Sport Team Rosberg	21	(United Kingdom) Jamie Green	All
Audi	Audi RS5 DTM	(Germany) Audi Sport Team Rosberg	22	(Switzerland) Nico Müller	All
BMW	BMW M4 DTM	(Belgium) BMW Team RBM	3	(Brazil) Augusto Farfus	All
BMW	BMW M4 DTM	(Belgium) BMW Team RBM	4	(United States) Joey Hand	All
BMW	BMW M4 DTM	(Germany) BMW Team Schnitzer	9	(Canada) Bruno Spengler	All
BMW	BMW M4 DTM	(Germany) BMW Team Schnitzer	10	(Germany) Martin Tomczyk	All
BMW	BMW M4 DTM	(Germany) BMW Team MTEK	17	(Germany) Timo Glock	All
BMW	BMW M4 DTM	(Germany) BMW Team MTEK	18	(Portugal) António Félix da Costa	All
BMW	BMW M4 DTM	(Germany) BMW Team RMG	23	(Germany) Marco Wittmann	All
BMW	BMW M4 DTM	(Germany) BMW Team RMG	24	(Belgium) Maxime Martin	All
Mercedes-Benz	DTM AMG Mercedes C-Coupé	(Germany) HWA Team	5	(Germany) Christian Vietoris	All
Mercedes-Benz	DTM AMG Mercedes C-Coupé	(Germany) HWA Team	6	(United Kingdom) Paul di Resta	All
Mercedes-Benz	DTM AMG Mercedes C-Coupé	(Germany) HWA Team	11	(United Kingdom) Gary Paffett	All
Mercedes-Benz	DTM AMG Mercedes C-Coupé	(Germany) HWA Team	12	(Canada) Robert Wickens	All
Mercedes-Benz	DTM AMG Mercedes C-Coupé	(Germany) HWA Team	25	(Germany) Pascal Wehrlein	All
Mercedes-Benz	DTM AMG Mercedes C-Coupé	(Germany) Mücke Motorsport	19	(Spain) Daniel Juncadella	All
Mercedes-Benz	DTM AMG Mercedes C-Coupé	(Germany) Mücke Motorsport	20	(Russia) Vitaly Petrov	All

=== Driver changes ===
Entering DTM

- BMW test driver and Marc VDS Racing Team driver Maxime Martin was promoted to a race seat in BMW Team RMG for the 2014 season.
- Both António Félix da Costa and Nico Müller, who finished third and fifth in the 2013 Formula Renault 3.5 Series season, joined the DTM series, driving for BMW Team MTEK and Team Rosberg respectively.
- Former Renault and Caterham Formula One driver Vitaly Petrov entered the championship, driving a Mercedes-Benz.

Leaving DTM

- Filipe Albuquerque, who drove for Audi switched to the marque's LMP and GT programme.
- Andy Priaulx, who drove for BMW in 2012 and 2013, left the series and joined the United SportsCar Championship.
- Dirk Werner, who drove for BMW in 2012 and 2013, left the series and joined the BMW endurance programme, including competing at the 24 Hours Nürburgring.
- Roberto Merhi who drove for Mercedes in 2012 and 2013, left the series and joined Zeta Corse in the Formula Renault 3.5 Series. He remained a Mercedes test and reserve driver.

== Results and standings ==
=== Results summary ===
Round	Circuit	Date	Pole position	Fastest lap	Winning driver	Winning team	Winning manufacturer
1	(Germany) Hockenheimring, Baden-Württemberg	4 May	(France) Adrien Tambay	(Germany) Martin Tomczyk	(Germany) Marco Wittmann	BMW Team RMG	BMW
2	(Germany) Motorsport Arena Oschersleben, Saxony-Anhalt	18 May	(Germany) Marco Wittmann	(Spain) Miguel Molina	(Germany) Christian Vietoris	HWA Team	Mercedes-Benz
3	(Hungary) Hungaroring, Mogyoród	1 June	(Germany) Marco Wittmann	(Switzerland) Nico Müller	(Germany) Marco Wittmann	BMW Team RMG	BMW
4	(Germany) Norisring, Nuremberg	29 June	(Canada) Robert Wickens	(Sweden) Mattias Ekström	(Canada) Robert Wickens	HWA Team	Mercedes-Benz
5	(Russia) Moscow Raceway, Volokolamsk	13 July	(Belgium) Maxime Martin	(Spain) Miguel Molina	(Belgium) Maxime Martin	BMW Team RMG	BMW
6	(Austria) Red Bull Ring, Spielberg	3 August	(Canada) Robert Wickens	(Germany) Mike Rockenfeller	(Germany) Marco Wittmann	BMW Team RMG	BMW
7	(Germany) Nürburgring, Rhineland-Palatinate	17 August	(Germany) Marco Wittmann	(Germany) Marco Wittmann	(Germany) Marco Wittmann	BMW Team RMG	BMW
8	(Germany) Lausitzring, Brandenburg	14 September	(Germany) Pascal Wehrlein	(Germany) Timo Scheider	(Germany) Pascal Wehrlein	HWA Team	Mercedes-Benz
9	(Netherlands) Circuit Park Zandvoort, North Holland	28 September	(Germany) Mike Rockenfeller	(Germany) Marco Wittmann	(Sweden) Mattias Ekström	Audi Sport Team Abt Sportsline	Audi
10	(Germany) Hockenheimring, Baden-Württemberg	19 October	(Spain) Miguel Molina	(Germany) Marco Wittmann	(Sweden) Mattias Ekström	Audi Sport Team Abt Sportsline	Audi

=== Championship standings ===
Scoring system

Points were awarded to the top ten classified finishers as follows:

Position	**1st**	**2nd**	**3rd**	**4th**	**5th**	**6th**	**7th**	**8th**	**9th**	**10th**
Points	25	18	15	12	10	8	6	4	2	1

Drivers' championship

Pos.	Driver	HOC (Germany)	OSC (Germany)	HUN (Hungary)	NOR (Germany)	MSC (Russia)	RBR (Austria)	NÜR (Germany)	LAU (Germany)	ZAN (Netherlands)	HOC (Germany)	Points
1	(Germany) Marco Wittmann	1	**19**	**1**	6	4	1	**1**	6	2	5	156
2	(Sweden) Mattias Ekström	2	13	9	3	3	7	Ret	Ret	1	1	106
3	(Germany) Mike Rockenfeller	4	2	10	8	Ret	13	2	10	**15**	2	72
4	(Germany) Christian Vietoris	15	1	20†	21†	7	9	6	2	5	14	69
5	(Italy) Edoardo Mortara	22†	3	4	4	9	16	3	16	4	22†	68
6	(Germany) Martin Tomczyk	7	9	13	Ret	13	4	8	8	3	7	49
7	(Belgium) Maxime Martin	20	14	6	17	**1**	14	7	14	6	Ret	47
8	(Germany) Pascal Wehrlein	11	Ret	14	5	8	Ret	10	**1**	7	20†	46
9	(Germany) Timo Scheider	9	7	Ret	10	Ret	5	Ret	3	9	6	44
10	(United Kingdom) Jamie Green	Ret	18†	7	2	Ret	8	14	17†	14	3	43
11	(Canada) Bruno Spengler	6	12	3	11	2	10	12	15	16	12	42
12	(Canada) Robert Wickens	18	Ret	11	**1**	14	**DSQ**	9	5	8	17	41
13	(Brazil) Augusto Farfus	8	5	21†	14	10	2	Ret	7	Ret	16	39
14	(France) Adrien Tambay	**3**	10	5	9	Ret	6	11	18†	Ret	19†	36
15	(United Kingdom) Paul di Resta	14	4	18	15	Ret	18	4	Ret	Ret	4	36
16	(Germany) Timo Glock	5	Ret	19	16	6	3	16	Ret	12	11	33
17	(Spain) Miguel Molina	13	6	2	22†	12	11	Ret	9	18†	**8**	32
18	(Spain) Daniel Juncadella	19	Ret	16	13	15	15	5	4	17	21†	22
19	(Switzerland) Nico Müller	16	16	12	18	5	19	Ret	Ret	Ret	13	10
20	(United States) Joey Hand	10	15	15	7	17	12	17	11	10	15	8
21	(Portugal) António Félix da Costa	21†	11	8	20	11	Ret	13	Ret	13	9	6
22	(United Kingdom) Gary Paffett	12	8	Ret	12	16	17	15	13	19†	10	5
23	(Russia) Vitaly Petrov	17	17	17	19	18	20	18	12	11	18†	0
Pos.	Driver	HOC (Germany)	OSC (Germany)	HUN (Hungary)	NOR (Germany)	MSC (Russia)	RBR (Austria)	NÜR (Germany)	LAU (Germany)	ZAN (Netherlands)	HOC (Germany)	Points

Colour	Result
Gold	Winner
Silver	Second place
Bronze	Third place
Green	Points classification
Blue	Non-points classification
Blue	Non-classified finish (NC)
Purple	Retired, not classified (Ret)
Red	Did not qualify (DNQ)
Red	Did not pre-qualify (DNPQ)
Black	Disqualified (DSQ)
White	Did not start (DNS)
White	Withdrew (WD)
White	Race cancelled (C)
Blank	Did not practice (DNP)
Blank	Did not arrive (DNA)
Blank	Excluded (EX)

**Bold** – Pole
Italics – Fastest Lap

- † — Driver retired, but was classified as they completed 75% of the winner's race distance.

Teams' championship

Pos.	Team	No.	HOC (Germany)	OSC (Germany)	HUN (Hungary)	NOR (Germany)	MSC (Russia)	RBR (Austria)	NÜR (Germany)	LAU (Germany)	ZAN (Netherlands)	HOC (Germany)	Points
1	BMW Team RMG	23	1	**19**	**1**	6	4	1	**1**	6	2	5	203
1	BMW Team RMG	24	20	14	6	17	**1**	14	7	14	6	Ret	203
2	Audi Sport Team Abt Sportsline	7	2	13	9	3	3	7	Ret	Ret	1	1	138
2	Audi Sport Team Abt Sportsline	8	13	6	2	22†	12	11	Ret	9	18†	**8**	138
3	Audi Sport Team Phoenix	1	4	2	10	8	Ret	13	2	10	**15**	2	116
3	Audi Sport Team Phoenix	2	9	7	Ret	10	Ret	5	Ret	3	9	6	116
4	HWA Team	5	15	1	20†	21†	7	9	6	2	5	14	105
4	HWA Team	6	14	4	18	15	Ret	18	4	Ret	Ret	4	105
5	Audi Sport Team Abt	15	22†	3	4	4	9	16	3	16	4	22†	104
5	Audi Sport Team Abt	16	**3**	10	5	9	Ret	6	11	18†	Ret	19†	104
6	BMW Team Schnitzer	9	6	12	3	11	2	10	12	15	16	12	91
6	BMW Team Schnitzer	10	7	9	13	Ret	13	4	8	8	3	7	91
7	Audi Sport Team Rosberg	21	Ret	18†	7	2	Ret	8	14	17†	14	3	53
7	Audi Sport Team Rosberg	22	16	16	12	18	5	19	Ret	Ret	Ret	13	53
8	BMW Team RBM	3	8	5	21†	14	10	2	Ret	7	Ret	16	47
8	BMW Team RBM	4	10	15	15	7	17	12	17	11	10	15	47
9	HWA Team	25	11	Ret	14	5	8	Ret	10	**1**	7	20†	46
10	HWA Team	11	12	8	Ret	12	16	17	15	13	19†	10	46
10	HWA Team	12	18	Ret	11	**1**	14	**DSQ**	9	5	8	17	46
11	BMW Team MTEK	17	5	Ret	19	16	6	3	16	Ret	12	11	39
11	BMW Team MTEK	18	21†	11	8	20	11	Ret	13	Ret	13	9	39
12	Mücke Motorsport	19	19	Ret	16	13	15	15	5	4	17	21†	22
12	Mücke Motorsport	20	17	17	17	19	18	20	18	12	11	18†	22
Pos.	Team	No.	HOC (Germany)	OSC (Germany)	HUN (Hungary)	NOR (Germany)	MSC (Russia)	RBR (Austria)	NÜR (Germany)	LAU (Germany)	ZAN (Netherlands)	HOC (Germany)	Points

Colour	Result
Gold	Winner
Silver	Second place
Bronze	Third place
Green	Points classification
Blue	Non-points classification
Blue	Non-classified finish (NC)
Purple	Retired, not classified (Ret)
Red	Did not qualify (DNQ)
Red	Did not pre-qualify (DNPQ)
Black	Disqualified (DSQ)
White	Did not start (DNS)
White	Withdrew (WD)
White	Race cancelled (C)
Blank	Did not practice (DNP)
Blank	Did not arrive (DNA)
Blank	Excluded (EX)

**Bold** – Pole
Italics – Fastest Lap

Manufacturers' championship

Pos.	Manufacturer	HOC (Germany)	OSC (Germany)	HUN (Hungary)	NOR (Germany)	MSC (Russia)	RBR (Austria)	NÜR (Germany)	LAU (Germany)	ZAN (Netherlands)	HOC (Germany)	Points
1	Audi	47	48	49	52	27	28	33	18	39	70	411
2	BMW	54	12	52	14	64	71	35	18	42	18	380
3	Mercedes-Benz	0	41	0	35	10	2	33	65	20	13	219
Pos.	Manufacturer	HOC (Germany)	OSC (Germany)	HUN (Hungary)	NOR (Germany)	MSC (Russia)	RBR (Austria)	NÜR (Germany)	LAU (Germany)	ZAN (Netherlands)	HOC (Germany)	Points

== Bibliography ==
- Schröder, Torben (November 2014). DTM – das offizielle Jahrbuch 2014 (in German). Saint Vith: Adrenalin Verlag. ISBN 978-3-943861-35-8.
- Krone, Lars (November 2014). Tourenwagen Story 2014: Alle Serien, Alle Rennen, Alle Sieger (in German). Saint Vith: Adrenalin Verlag. ISBN 978-3-943861-27-3.
