= 2013 Deutsche Tourenwagen Masters =

Fourteenth season of the Deutsche Tourenwagen Masters

Champions
- Drivers' Champion: Mike Rockenfeller
- Teams' Champion: Phoenix Racing
- Manufacturers' Championship: BMW

Seasons
- ← 2012 2014 →

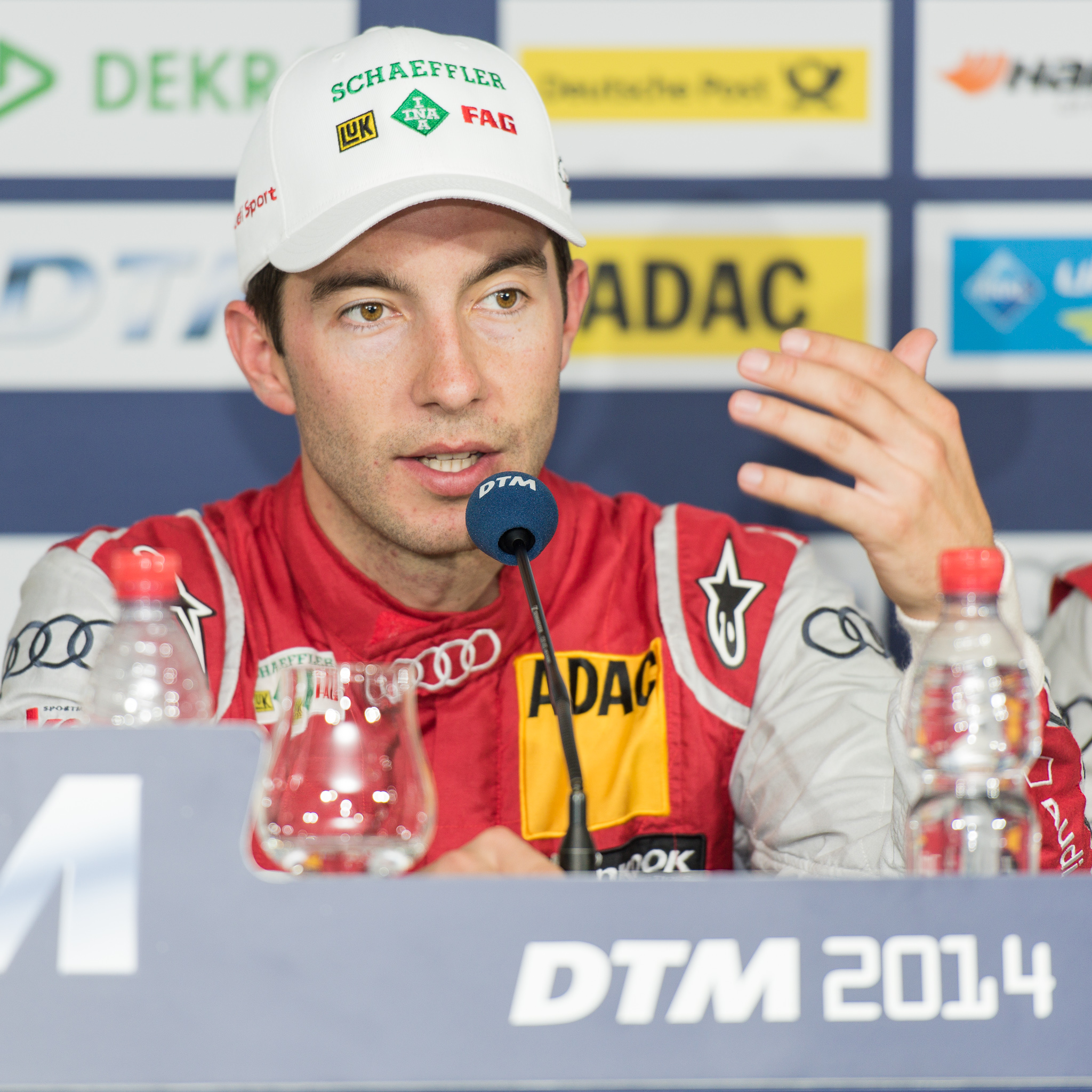
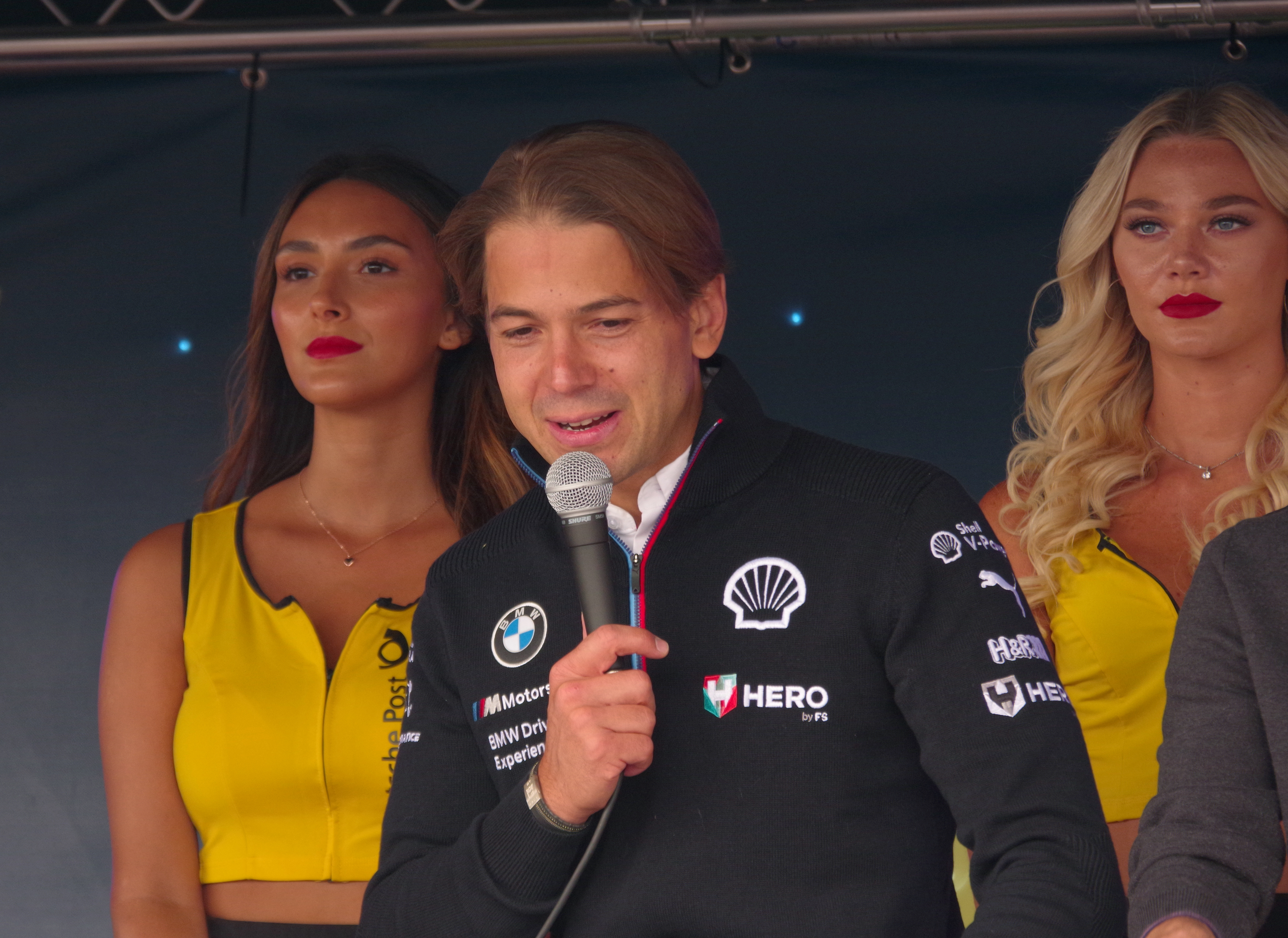
Mike Rockenfeller (left) won his first Drivers' Championship while Augusto Farfus (right) finished second in the championship.

The 2013 Deutsche Tourenwagen Masters was the twenty-seventh season of premier German touring car championship and also fourteenth season under the moniker of Deutsche Tourenwagen Masters since the series' resumption in 2000.

Bruno Spengler started the season as the defending drivers' champion. BMW was the defending manufacturers' champion, and BMW Team Schnitzer the defending teams' champion. Mike Rockenfeller clinched his first DTM title at the penultimate round of the season at Zandvoort, driving for Audi.

This was the first season since 2005 without any female DTM drivers after Susie Wolff and Rahel Frey left at the end of the 2012 season.

== Calendar ==
A provisional eleven-round calendar was announced on 23 October 2012, and the final schedule was published on 21 November 2012. A revised calendar was released by series organisers on 19 December 2012, with the Norisring round moved back by a week to avoid a clash with the German Grand Prix. To accommodate the change of date, the Zandvoort meeting was moved from July to September, and would become the penultimate event of the season, with the Oschersleben and second Hockenheim meetings also being held later than originally scheduled.

== Rule changes ==
=== Technical ===
- For the first time that all-DTM cars introduced the F1-style Drag Reduction Systems (DRS) to adjust the rear wing and assist overtaking with rear wing inclination angle to 15°.
- The minimum weight of the cars has been increased from 1,100 to 1,110 kg (2,425 to 2,447 lb) due to better aerodynamic reasons.
- The softer option tyre were introduced to improve spectacle and more degradable as well as pit stop window allocation tweaked.

=== Results summary ===
Round	Circuit	Date	Maps
1	(Germany) Hockenheimring, Baden-Württemberg	5 May	2013 Deutsche Tourenwagen Masters is located in Germany 2013 Deutsche Tourenwagen Masters is located in England 2013 Deutsche Tourenwagen Masters is located in Austria 2013 Deutsche Tourenwagen Masters is located in Netherlands 2013 Deutsche Tourenwagen Masters is located in European Russia
2	(United Kingdom) Brands Hatch, Kent	19 May	2013 Deutsche Tourenwagen Masters is located in Germany 2013 Deutsche Tourenwagen Masters is located in England 2013 Deutsche Tourenwagen Masters is located in Austria 2013 Deutsche Tourenwagen Masters is located in Netherlands 2013 Deutsche Tourenwagen Masters is located in European Russia
3	(Austria) Red Bull Ring, Spielberg	2 June	2013 Deutsche Tourenwagen Masters is located in Germany 2013 Deutsche Tourenwagen Masters is located in England 2013 Deutsche Tourenwagen Masters is located in Austria 2013 Deutsche Tourenwagen Masters is located in Netherlands 2013 Deutsche Tourenwagen Masters is located in European Russia
4	(Germany) Lausitzring, Brandenburg	16 June	2013 Deutsche Tourenwagen Masters is located in Germany 2013 Deutsche Tourenwagen Masters is located in England 2013 Deutsche Tourenwagen Masters is located in Austria 2013 Deutsche Tourenwagen Masters is located in Netherlands 2013 Deutsche Tourenwagen Masters is located in European Russia
5	(Germany) Norisring, Nuremberg	14 July	2013 Deutsche Tourenwagen Masters is located in Germany 2013 Deutsche Tourenwagen Masters is located in England 2013 Deutsche Tourenwagen Masters is located in Austria 2013 Deutsche Tourenwagen Masters is located in Netherlands 2013 Deutsche Tourenwagen Masters is located in European Russia
6	(Russia) Moscow Raceway, Volokolamsk	4 August	2013 Deutsche Tourenwagen Masters is located in Germany 2013 Deutsche Tourenwagen Masters is located in England 2013 Deutsche Tourenwagen Masters is located in Austria 2013 Deutsche Tourenwagen Masters is located in Netherlands 2013 Deutsche Tourenwagen Masters is located in European Russia
7	(Germany) Nürburgring, Rhineland-Palatinate	18 August	2013 Deutsche Tourenwagen Masters is located in Germany 2013 Deutsche Tourenwagen Masters is located in England 2013 Deutsche Tourenwagen Masters is located in Austria 2013 Deutsche Tourenwagen Masters is located in Netherlands 2013 Deutsche Tourenwagen Masters is located in European Russia
8	(Germany) Motorsport Arena Oschersleben, Saxony-Anhalt	15 September	2013 Deutsche Tourenwagen Masters is located in Germany 2013 Deutsche Tourenwagen Masters is located in England 2013 Deutsche Tourenwagen Masters is located in Austria 2013 Deutsche Tourenwagen Masters is located in Netherlands 2013 Deutsche Tourenwagen Masters is located in European Russia
9	(Netherlands) Circuit Park Zandvoort, North Holland	29 September	2013 Deutsche Tourenwagen Masters is located in Germany 2013 Deutsche Tourenwagen Masters is located in England 2013 Deutsche Tourenwagen Masters is located in Austria 2013 Deutsche Tourenwagen Masters is located in Netherlands 2013 Deutsche Tourenwagen Masters is located in European Russia
10	(Germany) Hockenheimring, Baden-Württemberg	20 October	2013 Deutsche Tourenwagen Masters is located in Germany 2013 Deutsche Tourenwagen Masters is located in England 2013 Deutsche Tourenwagen Masters is located in Austria 2013 Deutsche Tourenwagen Masters is located in Netherlands 2013 Deutsche Tourenwagen Masters is located in European Russia

=== Calendar changes ===
- The 2013 season saw the DTM series travel to Russia for the first time, with the inclusion of a round at the Moscow Raceway scheduled for August.
- The non-championship exhibition rounds held at the Munich Olympic Stadium in 2011 and 2012 was discontinued in 2013.
- The race at the Circuit Ricardo Tormo in Spain – which had been included on the DTM calendar in 2011 and 2012 – was discontinued.

== Teams and drivers ==
The following manufacturers, teams and drivers competed in the 2013 Deutsche Tourenwagen Masters. All teams competed with tyres supplied by Hankook.

Manufacturer	Car	Team	No.	Drivers	Rounds
BMW	BMW M3 DTM	(Germany) BMW Team Schnitzer	1	(Canada) Bruno Spengler	All
BMW	BMW M3 DTM	(Germany) BMW Team Schnitzer	2	(Germany) Dirk Werner	All
BMW	BMW M3 DTM	(Belgium) BMW Team RBM	7	(Brazil) Augusto Farfus	All
BMW	BMW M3 DTM	(Belgium) BMW Team RBM	8	(United States) Joey Hand	All
BMW	BMW M3 DTM	(Germany) BMW Team RMG	15	(Germany) Martin Tomczyk	All
BMW	BMW M3 DTM	(Germany) BMW Team RMG	16	(United Kingdom) Andy Priaulx	All
BMW	BMW M3 DTM	(Germany) BMW Team MTEK	21	(Germany) Marco Wittmann	All
BMW	BMW M3 DTM	(Germany) BMW Team MTEK	22	(Germany) Timo Glock	All
Mercedes-Benz	DTM AMG Mercedes C-Coupé	(Germany) HWA Team	3	(United Kingdom) Gary Paffett	All
Mercedes-Benz	DTM AMG Mercedes C-Coupé	(Germany) HWA Team	4	(Spain) Roberto Merhi	All
Mercedes-Benz	DTM AMG Mercedes C-Coupé	(Germany) HWA Team	9	(Germany) Christian Vietoris	All
Mercedes-Benz	DTM AMG Mercedes C-Coupé	(Germany) HWA Team	10	(Canada) Robert Wickens	All
Mercedes-Benz	DTM AMG Mercedes C-Coupé	(Germany) Mücke Motorsport	17	(Spain) Daniel Juncadella	All
Mercedes-Benz	DTM AMG Mercedes C-Coupé	(Germany) Mücke Motorsport	18	(Germany) Pascal Wehrlein	All
Audi	Audi RS5 DTM	(Germany) Team Rosberg	5	(Italy) Edoardo Mortara	All
Audi	Audi RS5 DTM	(Germany) Team Rosberg	6	(Portugal) Filipe Albuquerque	All
Audi	Audi RS5 DTM	(Germany) Abt Sportsline	11	(Sweden) Mattias Ekström	All
Audi	Audi RS5 DTM	(Germany) Abt Sportsline	12	(United Kingdom) Jamie Green	All
Audi	Audi RS5 DTM	(Germany) Phoenix Racing	19	(Germany) Mike Rockenfeller	All
Audi	Audi RS5 DTM	(Germany) Phoenix Racing	20	(Spain) Miguel Molina	All
Audi	Audi RS5 DTM	(Germany) Audi Sport Team Abt	23	(Germany) Timo Scheider	All
Audi	Audi RS5 DTM	(Germany) Audi Sport Team Abt	24	(France) Adrien Tambay	All

=== Team changes ===
- After competing with six cars in 2012, BMW increased its involvement in the series by expanding to eight cars. Team MTEK ran the new team for the marque.
- Mercedes-Benz initially submitted eight entries to the grid, but later scaled back their commitment to six cars after parting company with Persson Motorsport.

=== Driver changes ===
- David Coulthard left DTM after three seasons racing for Mercedes-Benz in order to continue his role as commentator of Formula One races for the BBC.
- Rahel Frey, who drove for Audi in 2011 and 2012, left the series and joined Audi's GT programme.
- Timo Glock left Formula One to join the DTM series, driving for BMW. Glock joined Team MTEK, BMW's fourth team.
- Jamie Green left Mercedes-Benz after eight seasons with the manufacturer to join Audi.
- Joey Hand and Andy Priaulx swapped seats, with Hand moving from Team RMG to join Team RBM, with Priaulx going in the opposite direction, moving from Team RBM to Team RMG.
- Formula 3 Euro Series front-runners Daniel Juncadella and Pascal Wehrlein joined the DTM series, driving for Mücke Motorsport.
- Having originally been announced as one of the six Mercedes drivers for the 2013 season, Ralf Schumacher announced his retirement from motor racing on 15 March 2013.
- BMW test driver Marco Wittmann was promoted to a race seat for the 2013 season, racing for Team MTEK.
- Susie Wolff ended her DTM career after seven seasons with Mercedes-Benz to focus solely on Williams F1 testing duties.

== Results and standings ==
=== Results summary ===
Round	Circuit	Date	Pole position	Fastest lap	Winning driver	Winning team	Winning manufacturer
1	(Germany) Hockenheimring, Baden-Württemberg	5 May	(Germany) Timo Scheider	(Brazil) Augusto Farfus	(Brazil) Augusto Farfus	BMW Team RBM	BMW
2	(United Kingdom) Brands Hatch, Kent	19 May	(Germany) Mike Rockenfeller	(United Kingdom) Gary Paffett	(Germany) Mike Rockenfeller	Phoenix Racing	Audi
3	(Austria) Red Bull Ring, Spielberg	2 June	(Canada) Bruno Spengler	(Germany) Marco Wittmann	(Canada) Bruno Spengler	BMW Team Schnitzer	BMW
4	(Germany) Lausitzring, Brandenburg	16 June	(Germany) Christian Vietoris	(Germany) Mike Rockenfeller	(United Kingdom) Gary Paffett	HWA Team	Mercedes-Benz
5	(Germany) Norisring, Nuremberg	14 July	(Canada) Robert Wickens	(Germany) Christian Vietoris	No winner (Note: Mattias Ekström was disqualified from the race after infringing parc ferme regulations. Following an appeal by Abt Sportsline to the Deutscher Motor Sport Bund, the disqualification was confirmed; however, drivers were not promoted in the race results, and as such, no driver was officially recognised as having finished in first place.)		
6	(Russia) Moscow Raceway, Volokolamsk	4 August	(Germany) Mike Rockenfeller	(France) Adrien Tambay	(Germany) Mike Rockenfeller	Phoenix Racing	Audi
7	(Germany) Nürburgring, Rhineland-Palatinate	18 August	(Brazil) Augusto Farfus	(Germany) Pascal Wehrlein	(Canada) Robert Wickens	HWA Team	Mercedes-Benz
8	(Germany) Motorsport Arena Oschersleben, Saxony-Anhalt	15 September	(United Kingdom) Jamie Green	(United States) Joey Hand	(Brazil) Augusto Farfus	BMW Team RBM	BMW
9	(Netherlands) Circuit Park Zandvoort, North Holland	29 September	(Germany) Marco Wittmann	(Germany) Marco Wittmann	(Brazil) Augusto Farfus	BMW Team RBM	BMW
10	(Germany) Hockenheimring, Baden-Württemberg	20 October	(Canada) Bruno Spengler	(Germany) Christian Vietoris	(Germany) Timo Glock	BMW Team MTEK	BMW

=== Championship standings ===
Scoring system

Points are awarded to the top ten classified finishers as follows:

Position	**1st**	**2nd**	**3rd**	**4th**	**5th**	**6th**	**7th**	**8th**	**9th**	**10th**
Points	25	18	15	12	10	8	6	4	2	1

Drivers' championship

Pos.	Driver	HOC (Germany)	BRH (United Kingdom)	RBR (Austria)	LAU (Germany)	NOR (Germany)	MSC (Russia)	NÜR (Germany)	OSC (Germany)	ZAN (Netherlands)	HOC (Germany)	Points
1	(Germany) Mike Rockenfeller	8	**1**	4	2	5	**1**	4	2	2	16	142
2	(Brazil) Augusto Farfus	1	Ret	6	12	16	3	**2**	1	1	11	116
3	(Canada) Bruno Spengler	5	2	**1**	7	6	19	14	21†	20	**3**	82
4	(Germany) Christian Vietoris	3	8	7	**3**	3	10	3	18	15	7	77
5	(Canada) Robert Wickens	Ret	3	12	4	**2**	12	1	22†	16	18	70
6	(United Kingdom) Gary Paffett	4	6	9	1	18†	5	17	6	9	9	69
7	(Sweden) Mattias Ekström	Ret	7	5	8	DSQ	2	13	7	4	4	68
8	(Germany) Marco Wittmann	9	4	2	21†	10	15	7	12	**5**	DSQ	49
9	(Germany) Timo Glock	Ret	13	3	14	13	16	18	15	18	1	40
10	(Germany) Timo Scheider	**6**	9	16	20	Ret	9	Ret	5	3	13	37
11	(United Kingdom) Jamie Green	14	15	18	5	19†	6	9	**3**	13	12	35
12	(United States) Joey Hand	7	5	Ret	15	8	7	Ret	16	7	20	32
13	(Germany) Dirk Werner	2	12	8	13	11	8	15	13	21†	8	30
14	(France) Adrien Tambay	Ret	18	11	11	15	4	6	9	6	14	30
15	(Spain) Roberto Merhi	10	16	20	10	7	14	19	14	Ret	2	26
16	(Spain) Daniel Juncadella	12	20	13	6	4	18	Ret	17	17	10	21
17	(Spain) Miguel Molina	15	11	14	16	14	Ret	8	8	10	5	19
18	(Portugal) Filipe Albuquerque	16	17	17	18	12	13	11	4	8	Ret	16
19	(Germany) Martin Tomczyk	13	14	Ret	19	Ret	17	5	20†	11	19	10
20	(United Kingdom) Andy Priaulx	17†	19	19	22	9	20	16	19	19	6	10
21	(Italy) Edoardo Mortara	Ret	21†	15	9	17†	Ret	12	10	14	15	3
22	(Germany) Pascal Wehrlein	11	10	10	17	20†	11	10	11	12	17	3
Pos.	Driver	HOC (Germany)	BRH (United Kingdom)	RBR (Austria)	LAU (Germany)	NOR (Germany)	MSC (Russia)	NÜR (Germany)	OSC (Germany)	ZAN (Netherlands)	HOC (Germany)	Points

Colour	Result
Gold	Winner
Silver	Second place
Bronze	Third place
Green	Points classification
Blue	Non-points classification
Blue	Non-classified finish (NC)
Purple	Retired, not classified (Ret)
Red	Did not qualify (DNQ)
Red	Did not pre-qualify (DNPQ)
Black	Disqualified (DSQ)
White	Did not start (DNS)
White	Withdrew (WD)
White	Race cancelled (C)
Blank	Did not practice (DNP)
Blank	Did not arrive (DNA)
Blank	Excluded (EX)

**Bold** – Pole
Italics – Fastest Lap

- † — Driver retired, but was classified as they completed 75% of the winner's race distance.

Teams' championship

Pos.	Team	No.	HOC (Germany)	BRH (United Kingdom)	RBR (Austria)	LAU (Germany)	NOR (Germany)	MSC (Russia)	NÜR (Germany)	OSC (Germany)	ZAN (Netherlands)	HOC (Germany)	Points
1	Audi Sport Team Phoenix	19	8	**1**	4	2	5	**1**	4	2	2	16	161
1	Audi Sport Team Phoenix	20	15	11	14	16	14	Ret	8	8	10	5	161
2	BMW Team RBM	7	1	Ret	6	12	16	3	**2**	1	1	11	148
2	BMW Team RBM	8	7	5	Ret	15	8	7	Ret	16	7	20	148
3	HWA Team	9	3	8	7	**3**	3	10	3	18	15	7	147
3	HWA Team	10	Ret	3	12	4	**2**	12	1	22†	16	18	147
4	BMW Team Schnitzer	1	5	2	**1**	7	6	19	14	21†	20	**3**	112
4	BMW Team Schnitzer	2	2	12	8	13	11	8	15	13	21†	8	112
5	Audi Sport Team Abt Sportsline	11	Ret	7	5	8	DSQ	2	13	7	4	4	103
5	Audi Sport Team Abt Sportsline	12	14	15	18	5	19†	6	9	**3**	13	12	103
6	HWA Team	3	4	6	9	1	18	5	17	6	9	9	95
6	HWA Team	4	10	16	20	10	7	14	19	14	Ret	2	95
7	BMW Team MTEK	21	9	4	2	21†	10	15	7	12	**5**	DSQ	89
7	BMW Team MTEK	22	Ret	13	3	14	13	16	18	15	18	1	89
8	Audi Sport Team Abt	23	6	9	16	20	Ret	9	Ret	5	3	13	67
8	Audi Sport Team Abt	24	Ret	18	11	11	15	4	6	9	6	14	67
9	Mücke Motorsport	17	12	20	13	6	4	18	Ret	17	17	10	24
9	Mücke Motorsport	18	11	10	10	17	20†	11	10	11	12	17	24
10	BMW Team RMG	15	13	14	Ret	19	Ret	17	5	20†	11	19	20
10	BMW Team RMG	16	17†	19	19	22†	9	20	16	19	19	6	20
11	Audi Sport Team Rosberg	5	Ret	21†	15	9	17	Ret	12	10	14	15	19
11	Audi Sport Team Rosberg	6	16	17	17	18	12	13	11	4	8	Ret	19
Pos.	Team	No.	HOC (Germany)	BRH (United Kingdom)	RBR (Austria)	LAU (Germany)	NOR (Germany)	MSC (Russia)	NÜR (Germany)	OSC (Germany)	ZAN (Netherlands)	HOC (Germany)	Points

Colour	Result
Gold	Winner
Silver	Second place
Bronze	Third place
Green	Points classification
Blue	Non-points classification
Blue	Non-classified finish (NC)
Purple	Retired, not classified (Ret)
Red	Did not qualify (DNQ)
Red	Did not pre-qualify (DNPQ)
Black	Disqualified (DSQ)
White	Did not start (DNS)
White	Withdrew (WD)
White	Race cancelled (C)
Blank	Did not practice (DNP)
Blank	Did not arrive (DNA)
Blank	Excluded (EX)

**Bold** – Pole
Italics – Fastest Lap

Manufacturers' championship

Pos.	Manufacturer	HOC (Germany)	BRH (United Kingdom)	RBR (Austria)	LAU (Germany)	NOR (Germany)	MSC (Russia)	NÜR (Germany)	OSC (Germany)	ZAN (Netherlands)	HOC (Germany)	Points
1	BMW	61	40	70	6	15	25	34	25	41	52	369
2	Audi	12	33	22	34	10	65	26	65	58	22	347
3	Mercedes-Benz	28	28	9	61	51	11	41	8	2	27	266
Pos.	Manufacturer	HOC (Germany)	BRH (United Kingdom)	RBR (Austria)	LAU (Germany)	NOR (Germany)	MSC (Russia)	NÜR (Germany)	OSC (Germany)	ZAN (Netherlands)	HOC (Germany)	Points

== Bibliography ==
- Schröder, Torben (November 2013). DTM – Das offizielle Jahrbuch 2013 (in German). Saint Vith: Adrenalin Verlag. ISBN 978-3-943861-16-7.
- Voigt, Thomas; Krone, Lars (December 2013). Tourenwagen Story 2013: Alle Serien, Alle Rennen, Alle Sieger (in German). Saint Vith: Adrenalin Verlag. ISBN 978-3-943861-17-4.
