= 2016 Deutsche Tourenwagen Masters =

German touring car championship season

Champions
- Drivers' Champion: Marco Wittmann
- Teams' Champion: Abt Sportsline
- Manufacturers' Championship: Audi

Seasons
- ← 2015 2017 →

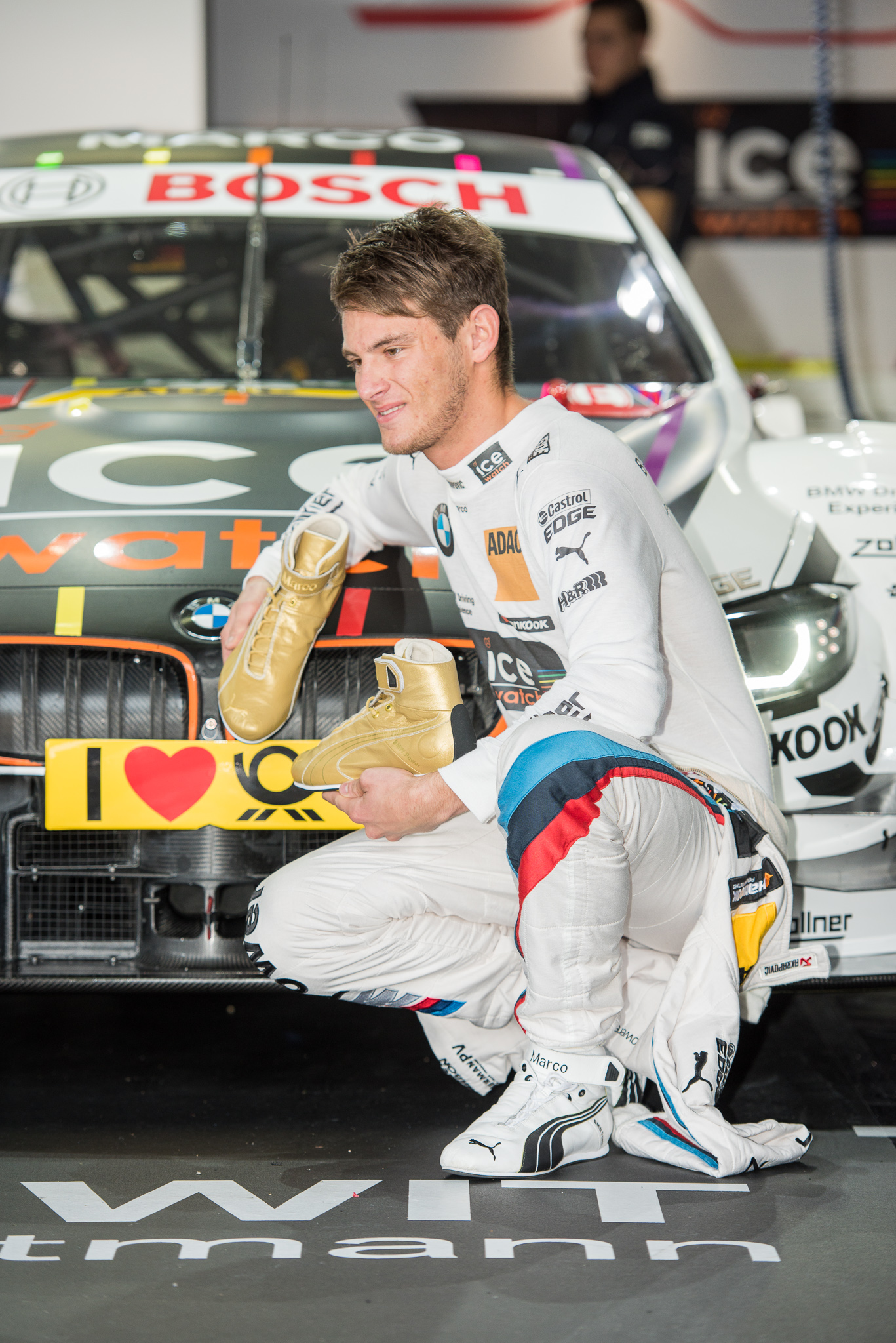
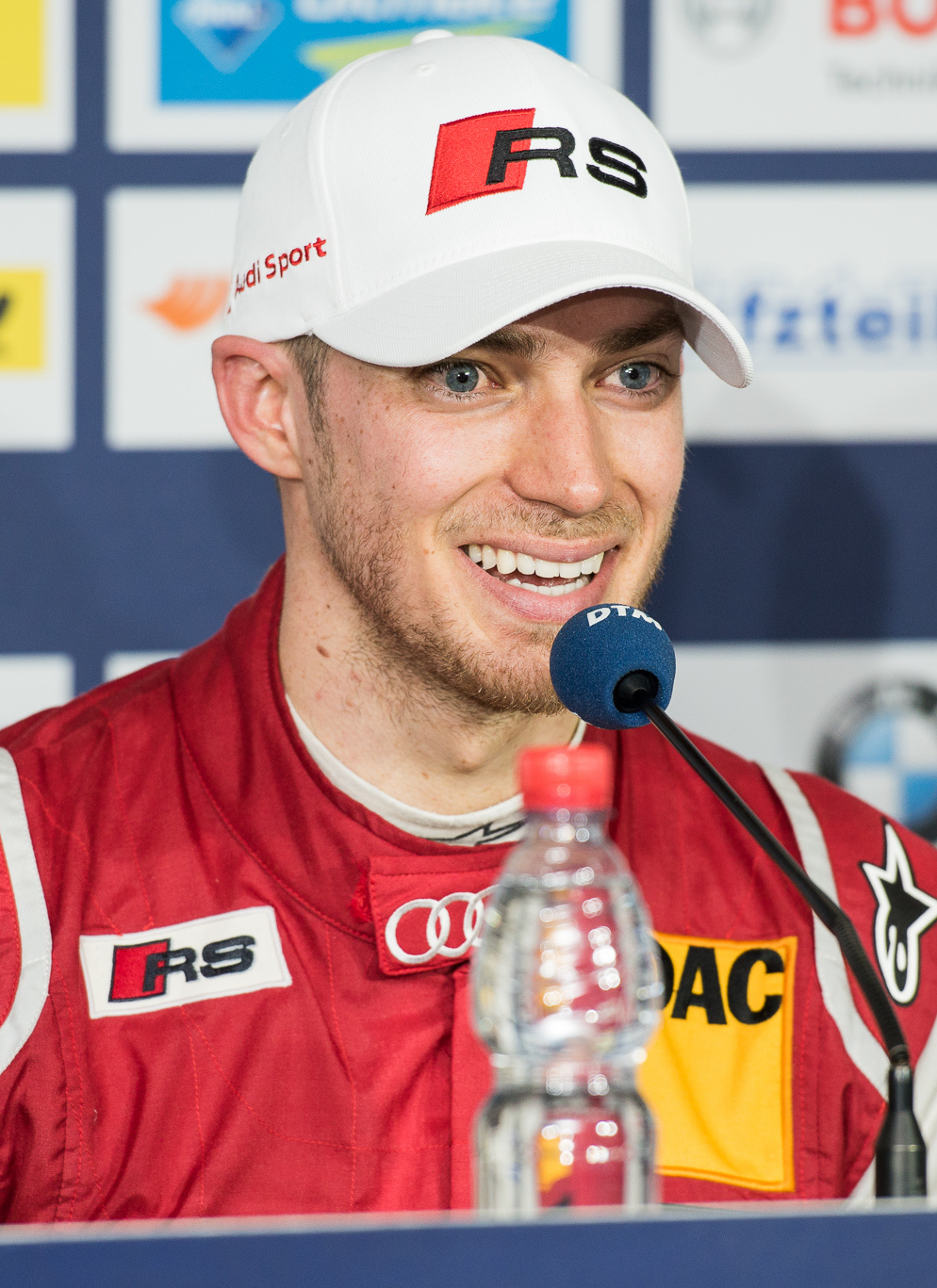
Marco Wittmann (left) won his second Drivers' Championship while Edoardo Mortara (right) finished second in the championship.

The 2016 Deutsche Tourenwagen Masters was the thirtieth season of premier German touring car championship and also seventeenth season under the moniker of Deutsche Tourenwagen Masters since the series' resumption in 2000. The season started on 7 May at Hockenheim, and ended on 16 October at the same venue. Marco Wittmann won his 2nd DTM championship after a total of nine events.

== Rule changes for 2016 ==
=== Technical ===
- The Balance of Performance DTM car weights were revised to improve racing spectacle.

== Teams and drivers ==
The following manufacturers, teams and drivers competed in the 2016 Deutsche Tourenwagen Masters. All teams competed with tyres supplied by Hankook.

| Manufacturer | Car | Team | No. | Drivers | Rounds |
|---|---|---|---|---|---|
| Mercedes-Benz | Mercedes-AMG C63 DTM | (France) Mercedes-AMG Team ART | 2 | (United Kingdom) Gary Paffett | All |
| Mercedes-Benz | Mercedes-AMG C63 DTM | (France) Mercedes-AMG Team ART | 34 | (France) Esteban Ocon | 1–5 |
| Mercedes-Benz | Mercedes-AMG C63 DTM | (France) Mercedes-AMG Team ART | 88 | (Sweden) Felix Rosenqvist | 6–9 |
| Mercedes-Benz | Mercedes-AMG C63 DTM | (Germany) Mercedes-AMG Team HWA II | 3 | (United Kingdom) Paul di Resta | All |
| Mercedes-Benz | Mercedes-AMG C63 DTM | (Germany) Mercedes-AMG Team HWA II | 84 | (Germany) Maximilian Götz | All |
| Mercedes-Benz | Mercedes-AMG C63 DTM | (Germany) Mercedes-AMG Team HWA I | 6 | (Canada) Robert Wickens | All |
| Mercedes-Benz | Mercedes-AMG C63 DTM | (Germany) Mercedes-AMG Team HWA I | 12 | (Spain) Daniel Juncadella | All |
| Mercedes-Benz | Mercedes-AMG C63 DTM | (Germany) Mercedes-AMG Team Mücke | 8 | (Germany) Christian Vietoris | All |
| Mercedes-Benz | Mercedes-AMG C63 DTM | (Germany) Mercedes-AMG Team Mücke | 22 | (Austria) Lucas Auer | All |
| Audi | Audi RS5 DTM | (Germany) Audi Sport Team Abt Sportsline | 5 | (Sweden) Mattias Ekström | 1–8 |
| Audi | Audi RS5 DTM | (Germany) Audi Sport Team Abt Sportsline | 48 | (Italy) Edoardo Mortara | All |
| Audi | Audi RS5 DTM | (Germany) Audi Sport Team Abt Sportsline | 99 | (Germany) Mike Rockenfeller | 9 |
| Audi | Audi RS5 DTM | (Germany) Audi Sport Team Phoenix | 10 | (Germany) Timo Scheider | All |
| Audi | Audi RS5 DTM | (Germany) Audi Sport Team Phoenix | 72 | (Germany) René Rast | 9 |
| Audi | Audi RS5 DTM | (Germany) Audi Sport Team Phoenix | 99 | (Germany) Mike Rockenfeller | 1–8 |
| Audi | Audi RS5 DTM | (Germany) Audi Sport Team Abt | 17 | (Spain) Miguel Molina | All |
| Audi | Audi RS5 DTM | (Germany) Audi Sport Team Abt | 51 | (Switzerland) Nico Müller | All |
| Audi | Audi RS5 DTM | (Germany) Audi Sport Team Rosberg | 27 | (France) Adrien Tambay | All |
| Audi | Audi RS5 DTM | (Germany) Audi Sport Team Rosberg | 53 | (United Kingdom) Jamie Green | All |
| Audi | Audi RS5 DTM | (Germany) Audi Sport Team Rosberg | 72 | (Germany) René Rast | 5 |
| BMW | BMW M4 DTM | (Germany) BMW Team MTEK | 7 | (Canada) Bruno Spengler | All |
| BMW | BMW M4 DTM | (Germany) BMW Team MTEK | 18 | (Brazil) Augusto Farfus | All |
| BMW | BMW M4 DTM | (Germany) BMW Team RMG | 11 | (Germany) Marco Wittmann | All |
| BMW | BMW M4 DTM | (Germany) BMW Team RMG | 16 | (Germany) Timo Glock | All |
| BMW | BMW M4 DTM | (Germany) BMW Team Schnitzer | 13 | (Portugal) António Félix da Costa | All |
| BMW | BMW M4 DTM | (Germany) BMW Team Schnitzer | 100 | (Germany) Martin Tomczyk | All |
| BMW | BMW M4 DTM | (Belgium) BMW Team RBM | 31 | (United Kingdom) Tom Blomqvist | All |
| BMW | BMW M4 DTM | (Belgium) BMW Team RBM | 36 | (Belgium) Maxime Martin | All |

=== Driver changes ===
Entering DTM

- 2015 GP3 Series champion and Mercedes DTM reserve driver Esteban Ocon made his DTM debut with Mercedes-Benz.

Leaving DTM

- 2015 DTM champion Pascal Wehrlein left the series to race in Formula One with Manor Racing.

Mid-season changes

- Adrien Tambay was injured in the first race of Round 5 with René Rast replacing him for race 2.
- After Round 5, Esteban Ocon left the DTM to race in Formula One with Manor Racing. He was replaced by 2015 European Formula 3 champion and Mercedes DTM reserve driver Felix Rosenqvist.
- René Rast replaced Mattias Ekström at Hockenheim for the final round. After that he and Mike Rockenfeller were swapped in the team.

== Calendar ==
The nine event calendar was announced on 30 November 2015. Oschersleben was officially removed from calendar.

| Round | | Circuit | Date | Pole position | Fastest lap | Winning driver | Winning team | Winning manufacturer |
|---|---|---|---|---|---|---|---|---|
| 1 | R1 | (Germany) Hockenheimring, Baden-Württemberg | 7 May | (Switzerland) Nico Müller | (Canada) Robert Wickens | (Italy) Edoardo Mortara | Audi Sport Team Abt Sportsline | Audi |
| 1 | R2 | (Germany) Hockenheimring, Baden-Württemberg | 8 May | (United Kingdom) Paul di Resta | (United Kingdom) Paul di Resta | (United Kingdom) Paul di Resta | Mercedes-Benz DTM Team HWA II | Mercedes-Benz |
| 2 | R1 | (Austria) Red Bull Ring, Spielberg | 21 May | (Germany) Marco Wittmann | (Sweden) Mattias Ekström | (Germany) Marco Wittmann | BMW Team RMG | BMW |
| 2 | R2 | (Austria) Red Bull Ring, Spielberg | 22 May | (United Kingdom) Jamie Green | (Canada) Robert Wickens | (Germany) Timo Glock | BMW Team RMG | BMW |
| 3 | R1 | (Germany) Lausitzring, Brandenburg | 4 June | (Spain) Miguel Molina | (Spain) Miguel Molina | (Spain) Miguel Molina | Audi Sport Team Abt | Audi |
| 3 | R2 | (Germany) Lausitzring, Brandenburg | 5 June | (Austria) Lucas Auer | (United Kingdom) Jamie Green | (Austria) Lucas Auer | Mercedes-Benz DTM Team Mücke | Mercedes-Benz |
| 4 | R1 | (Germany) Norisring, Nuremberg | 25 June | (Germany) Christian Vietoris | (Italy) Edoardo Mortara | (Italy) Edoardo Mortara | Audi Sport Team Abt Sportsline | Audi |
| 4 | R2 | (Germany) Norisring, Nuremberg | 26 June | (United Kingdom) Tom Blomqvist (Note: Originally scored by Mattias Ekström, the Swede had to serve a three-place grid penalty after causing a collision in the previous race.) | (United Kingdom) Tom Blomqvist | (Switzerland) Nico Müller | Audi Sport Team Abt | Audi |
| 5 | R1 | (Netherlands) Circuit Park Zandvoort, North Holland | 16 July | (Canada) Robert Wickens | (Canada) Robert Wickens | (Canada) Robert Wickens | Mercedes-Benz DTM Team HWA I | Mercedes-Benz |
| 5 | R2 | (Netherlands) Circuit Park Zandvoort, North Holland | 17 July | (United Kingdom) Jamie Green | (Spain) Daniel Juncadella | (United Kingdom) Jamie Green | Audi Sport Team Rosberg | Audi |
| 6 | R1 | (Russia) Moscow Raceway, Volokolamsk | 20 August | (United Kingdom) Gary Paffett | (Spain) Daniel Juncadella | (Canada) Robert Wickens | Mercedes-Benz DTM Team HWA I | Mercedes-Benz |
| 6 | R2 | (Russia) Moscow Raceway, Volokolamsk | 21 August | (Germany) Marco Wittmann | (Switzerland) Nico Müller | (Germany) Marco Wittmann | BMW Team RMG | BMW |
| 7 | R1 | (Germany) Nürburgring, Rhineland-Palatinate | 10 September | (Germany) Marco Wittmann (Note: Originally scored by Lucas Auer, the Austrian had to serve a five-place grid penalty after receiving his third warning of the season in the previous round.) | (United Kingdom) Jamie Green | (Germany) Marco Wittmann | BMW Team RMG | BMW |
| 7 | R2 | (Germany) Nürburgring, Rhineland-Palatinate | 11 September | (Austria) Lucas Auer | (Switzerland) Nico Müller | (Italy) Edoardo Mortara | Audi Sport Team Abt Sportsline | Audi |
| 8 | R1 | (Hungary) Hungaroring, Mogyoród | 24 September | (Italy) Edoardo Mortara | (Italy) Edoardo Mortara | (Italy) Edoardo Mortara | Audi Sport Team Abt Sportsline | Audi |
| 8 | R2 | (Hungary) Hungaroring, Mogyoród | 25 September | (Italy) Edoardo Mortara | (Sweden) Mattias Ekström | (Sweden) Mattias Ekström | Audi Sport Team Abt Sportsline | Audi |
| 9 | R1 | (Germany) Hockenheimring, Baden-Württemberg | 15 October | (Portugal) António Félix da Costa | (Portugal) António Félix da Costa | (Spain) Miguel Molina | Audi Sport Team Abt | Audi |
| 9 | R2 | (Germany) Hockenheimring, Baden-Württemberg | 16 October | (Portugal) António Félix da Costa | (Italy) Edoardo Mortara | (Italy) Edoardo Mortara | Audi Sport Team Abt Sportsline | Audi |

== Championship standings ==
Scoring system

Points were awarded to the top ten classified finishers as follows:

| Position | **1st** | **2nd** | **3rd** | **4th** | **5th** | **6th** | **7th** | **8th** |
| Points | 10 | 8 | 6 | 5 | 4 | 3 | 2 | 1 |

=== Drivers' championship ===
| Pos. | Driver | HOC (Germany) | | RBR (Austria) | | LAU (Germany) | | NOR (Germany) | | ZAN (Netherlands) | | MSC (Russia) | | NÜR (Germany) | | HUN (Hungary) | | HOC (Germany) | | Points |
|---|---|---|---|---|---|---|---|---|---|---|---|---|---|---|---|---|---|---|---|---|
| 1 | (Germany) Marco Wittmann | 16 | 8 | **1** | 7 | 4 | 6 | 4 | 6 | 2 | 4 | 19 | **1** | **1** | 3 | 7 | DSQ | 2 | 4 | 206 |
| 2 | (Italy) Edoardo Mortara | 1 | 11 | 3 | Ret | 8 | 12 | 1 | 8 | 17 | 3 | 8 | 6 | 4 | 1 | **1** | **19**† | 3 | 1 | 202 |
| 3 | (United Kingdom) Jamie Green | 15 | Ret | 14 | **3** | 2 | 4 | 2 | 17† | 5 | **1** | 7 | 22 | 3 | 16 | 2 | Ret | 8 | 8 | 145 |
| 4 | (Canada) Robert Wickens | 2 | 5 | 11 | 20 | 3 | 3 | Ret | 11 | **1** | 16 | 1 | 5 | 9 | 13 | 10 | 10 | 23† | 9 | 124 |
| 5 | (United Kingdom) Paul di Resta | 4 | **1** | 7 | 15 | 13 | 21† | 3 | 4 | 15 | 8 | 2 | 20 | 6 | Ret | Ret | 13 | 10 | 3 | 116 |
| 6 | (United Kingdom) Tom Blomqvist | 13 | 6 | 2 | 6 | 22 | 11 | 15 | **2** | 16 | 10 | 22 | 2 | 2 | 8 | 22 | 4 | 9 | 7 | 113 |
| 7 | (Sweden) Mattias Ekström | 9 | Ret | 16 | Ret | 6 | 2 | Ret | Ret | 7 | 7 | 5 | 9 | DSQ | 4 | 18 | Ret | | | 107 |
| 8 | (Belgium) Maxime Martin | 8 | 3 | 6 | 5 | 9 | 13 | 6 | 3 | 10 | Ret | 6 | 17 | 8 | 10 | 13 | 7 | 13 | 6 | 90 |
| 9 | (Switzerland) Nico Müller | **3** | 7 | 10 | Ret | 10 | 8 | 20 | 1 | 20 | 5 | 13 | 7 | 11 | 5 | 5 | Ret | 15 | 13 | 88 |
| 10 | (Germany) Timo Glock | Ret | DSQ | 4 | 1 | 12 | 10 | 21 | 9 | 21 | 6 | 11 | 24† | 5 | 14 | 13 | 5 | 7 | 5 | 84 |
| 11 | (United Kingdom) Gary Paffett | 11 | 4 | 18 | 13 | 14 | 5 | 14 | DSQ | 4 | 2 | **3** | 18 | 19 | 7 | 20 | 16 | 19 | 15 | 73 |
| 12 | (Austria) Lucas Auer | 17† | 15† | 21 | 16 | 7 | **1** | 13 | 5 | 12 | 9 | 18 | 10 | 7 | **2** | 15 | 15 | 18 | 16 | 68 |
| 13 | (Spain) Miguel Molina | 10 | Ret | 19 | 14 | **1** | 19 | 17 | 14 | 18 | Ret | 17 | 11 | 15 | 20 | 3 | 18 | 1 | 14 | 66 |
| 14 | (Germany) Christian Vietoris | 5 | 14 | Ret | 17 | 5 | 7 | **10** | 15 | 3 | 20† | 23 | 14 | 13 | 17 | 17 | 14 | 22 | 2 | 60 |
| 15 | (Canada) Bruno Spengler | 6 | Ret | 13 | 9 | 11 | 9 | 5 | 7 | 13 | 14 | 15 | 3 | 18 | 6 | 14 | 12 | 14 | 12 | 51 |
| 16 | (Brazil) Augusto Farfus | 14 | 2 | 9 | 4 | 21 | Ret | 11 | Ret | Ret | 13 | 14 | 4 | 22 | 21 | 19 | Ret | 11 | Ret | 44 |
| 17 | (Portugal) António Félix da Costa | 7 | Ret | 22 | 21 | 15 | 14 | 9 | DSQ | 6 | 17 | 20 | 19 | 20 | 19 | 16 | 3 | **4** | **Ret** | 43 |
| 18 | (France) Adrien Tambay | Ret | 13 | 8 | 11 | 20 | 20 | 7 | DSQ | Ret | | 12 | 8 | Ret | 15 | 6 | 2 | 12 | Ret | 40 |
| 19 | (Germany) Mike Rockenfeller | Ret | 10 | 12 | 8 | 19 | 17 | 18 | DSQ | 14 | 15 | 16 | 15 | 14 | 22 | 4 | 8 | 5 | 11 | 31 |
| 20 | (Germany) Maximilian Götz | Ret | 12 | 15 | 22 | 16 | Ret | 8 | 12 | Ret | Ret | 4 | 16 | 10 | 23 | 21 | 17 | 17 | 19 | 17 |
| 21 | (Germany) Martin Tomczyk | 12 | 9 | 5 | 19 | Ret | 18 | 12 | 10 | 19 | 11 | 21 | 23 | 16 | 12 | 23 | 9 | 20 | 10 | 16 |
| 22 | (Germany) Timo Scheider | Ret | Ret | 17 | 10 | 17 | 16 | 16 | 16 | 11 | Ret | 9 | 13 | 21 | 11 | 9 | 6 | 16 | 18 | 13 |
| 23 | (Germany) René Rast | | | | | | | | | | 19 | | | | | | | 6 | 17 | 8 |
| 24 | (Spain) Daniel Juncadella | Ret | 16† | Ret | 12 | 18 | Ret | 19 | DSQ | 8 | 12 | 24 | 12 | 17 | 9 | 11 | DSQ | 21 | Ret | 6 |
| 25 | (Sweden) Felix Rosenqvist | | | | | | | | | | | 10 | 21 | 12 | 18 | 8 | 11 | Ret | Ret | 5 |
| 26 | (France) Esteban Ocon | Ret | Ret | 20 | 18 | 23 | 15 | Ret | 13 | 9 | 18 | | | | | | | | | 2 |
| Pos. | Driver | HOC (Germany) | | RBR (Austria) | | LAU (Germany) | | NOR (Germany) | | ZAN (Netherlands) | | MSC (Russia) | | NÜR (Germany) | | HUN (Hungary) | | HOC (Germany) | | Points |

| Colour | Result |
|---|---|
| Gold | Winner |
| Silver | Second place |
| Bronze | Third place |
| Green | Points classification |
| Blue | Non-points classification |
| Blue | Non-classified finish (NC) |
| Purple | Retired, not classified (Ret) |
| Red | Did not qualify (DNQ) |
| Red | Did not pre-qualify (DNPQ) |
| Black | Disqualified (DSQ) |
| White | Did not start (DNS) |
| White | Withdrew (WD) |
| White | Race cancelled (C) |
| Blank | Did not practice (DNP) |
| Blank | Did not arrive (DNA) |
| Blank | Excluded (EX) |

**Bold** – Pole
Italics – Fastest Lap

- † — Driver retired, but was classified as they completed 75% of the winner's race distance.

=== Manufacturers' championship ===
| Pos. | Driver | HOC (Germany) | | RBR (Austria) | | LAU (Germany) | | NOR (Germany) | | ZAN (Netherlands) | | MSC (Russia) | | NÜR (Germany) | | HUN (Hungary) | | HOC (Germany) | | Points |
|---|---|---|---|---|---|---|---|---|---|---|---|---|---|---|---|---|---|---|---|---|
| 1 | Audi | 43 | 7 | 20 | 38 | 56 | 34 | 49 | 29 | 16 | 56 | 22 | 20 | 27 | 47 | 90 | 55 | 62 | 29 | 700 |
| 2 | BMW | 18 | 47 | 75 | 63 | 14 | 11 | 32 | 50 | 27 | 21 | 8 | 70 | 57 | 28 | 6 | 45 | 38 | 37 | 647 |
| 3 | Mercedes-Benz | 40 | 47 | 6 | 0 | 31 | 56 | 20 | 22 | 58 | 24 | 71 | 11 | 17 | 26 | 5 | 1 | 1 | 35 | 471 |
| Pos. | Driver | HOC (Germany) | | RBR (Austria) | | LAU (Germany) | | NOR (Germany) | | ZAN (Netherlands) | | MSC (Russia) | | NÜR (Germany) | | HUN (Hungary) | | HOC (Germany) | | Points |

=== Teams' championship ===
| Pos. | Team | Points |
|---|---|---|
| 1 | Audi Sport Team Abt Sportsline | 319 |
| 2 | BMW Team RMG | 290 |
| 3 | BMW Team RBM | 203 |
| 4 | Audi Sport Team Rosberg | 185 |
| 5 | Audi Sport Team Abt | 154 |
| 6 | Mercedes-Benz DTM Team HWA II | 133 |
| 7 | Mercedes-Benz DTM Team HWA I | 130 |
| 8 | Mercedes-Benz DTM Team Mücke | 128 |
| 9 | BMW Team MTEK | 95 |
| 10 | Mercedes-Benz DTM Team ART | 80 |
| 11 | BMW Team Schnitzer | 59 |
| 12 | Audi Sport Team Phoenix | 42 |

== Bibliography ==
- Upietz, Tim (1 December 2016). DTM 2016: Das offizielle Jahrbuch. Duisburg: Gruppe C Motorsport Verlag. ISBN 978-3-928540-87-2.
