= Martin Tomczyk =

German racing driver (born 1981)

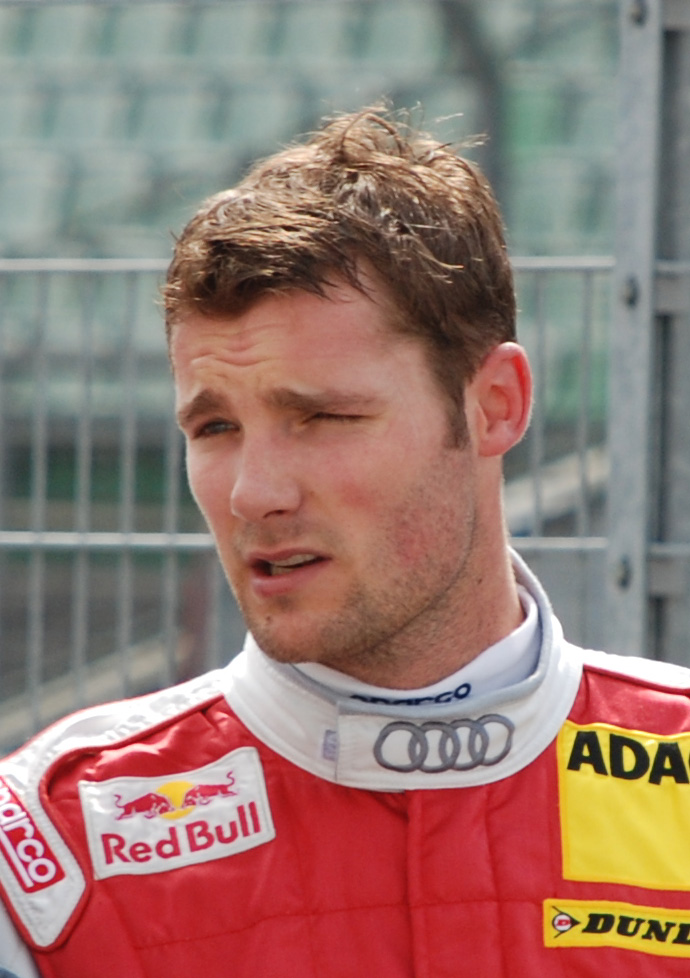
- Nationality: (Germany) German
- Born: 7 December 1981 (age 44) Rosenheim, West Germany

DTM
- Categorisation: FIA Platinum
- Years active: 2001–2016
- Former teams: BMW Team Schnitzer; BMW Team RMG; Audi Sport Team Phoenix; Abt Sportsline
- Starts: 195
- Championships: 1 (2011)
- Wins: 8
- Podiums: 31
- Poles: 8
- Fastest laps: 8

Previous series
- 2000 1999 1998: German Formula 3 Formula BMW ADAC; Formula BMW Junior

Championship titles
- 2011: DTM

Martin Tomczyk (born 7 December 1981) is a German former professional racing driver. He is now the motorsports director at ABT Sportsline.

Tomczyk was the DTM champion in 2011, third in 2007, fourth in 2006 and fifth in 2004, having won eight races.

== Racing career ==
After a karting career, Tomczyk raced in Formula BMW and Formula Three, where he finished 12th in 2000.

In 2001, Tomczyk moved up to the Deutsche Tourenwagen Masters. In 2000 his best result was a fourth place on the Nürburgring where he also took the fastest of the race. He took his first pole position in Hockenheim 2002 but he retired from the race. In 2004, he took his first podium in Estoril. During 2004, he also finished second in Zandvoort, Oschersleben and Hockenheim on his way to finish fifth in the championship. Tomczyk took his first win in Catalunya 2006 where he also took pole. In 2007, he took two wins to finish third that season.

Eleven years after his DTM debut, Tomczyk won the championship in 2011, driving for Team Phoenix, after nine races with three wins and a third-place finish in Valencia. In 2012, Tomczyk was signed as a BMW Team RBM driver, moving to Team RMG in 2013.

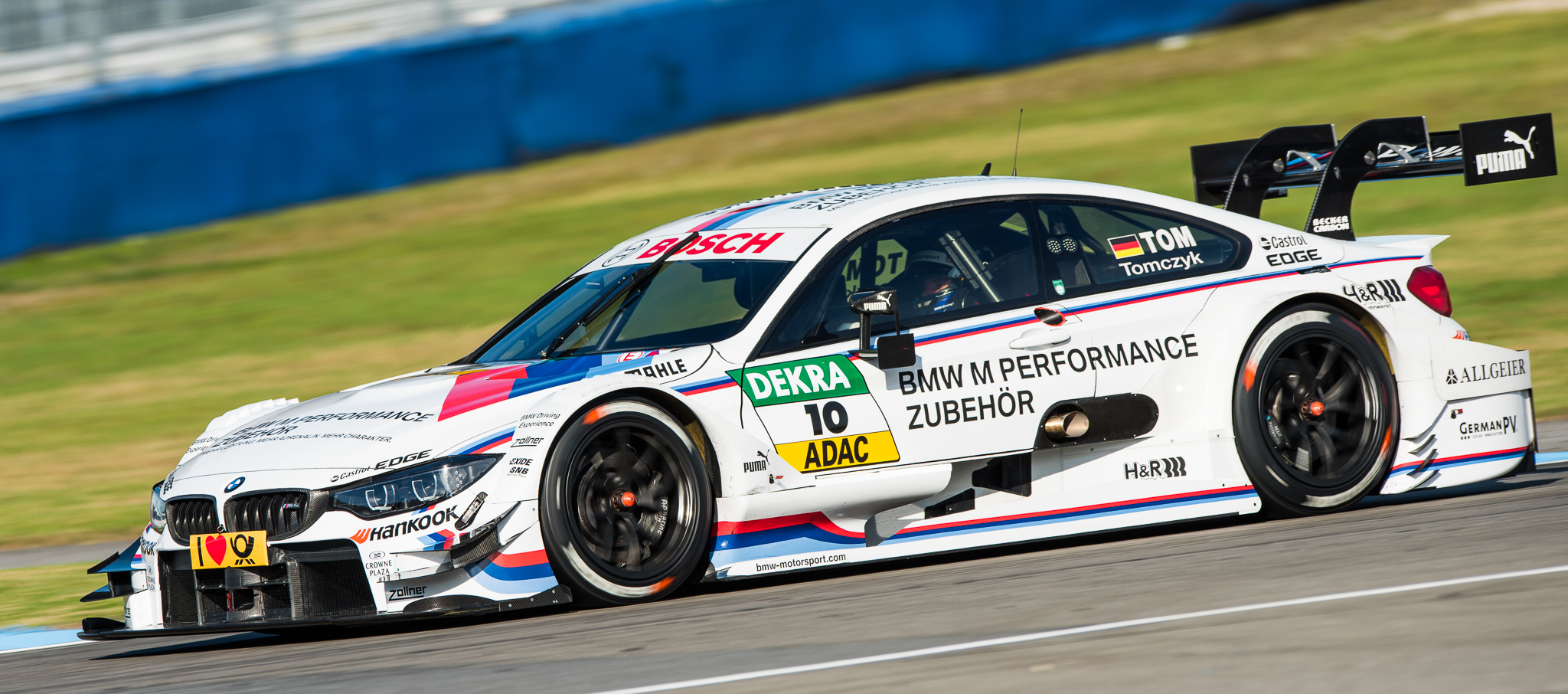
Martin Tomczyk, Deutsche Tourenwagen Masters 2014 - Hockenheimring

Tomczyk's father Hermann is president of the Deutscher Motor Sport Bund.

After BMW's DTM program was reduced in 2017, Tomczyk retired from the series and continued driving with the Bavarian manufacturer in the IMSA WeatherTech SportsCar Championship.

Following his retirement from full-time racing, Tomczyk became the series manager of the DTM Trophy. In 2023, he became the managing director of Abt Sportsline.

== Racing record ==
=== Career summary ===
| Season | Series | Team | Races | Wins | Poles | F/Laps | Podiums | Points | Position |
|---|---|---|---|---|---|---|---|---|---|
| 1998 | Formula BMW Junior | | ? | ? | ? | ? | ? | 224 | **2nd** |
| 1999 | Formula BMW ADAC | BMW Rookie Team | 16 | 0 | 0 | ? | 9 | 159 | 4th |
| 2000 | German Formula 3 Championship | Opel Team KMS | 18 | 0 | 0 | 0 | 0 | 49 | 12th |
| 2001 | Deutsche Tourenwagen Masters | Abt Sportsline Junior | 20 | 0 | 0 | 1 | 1 | 23 | 13th |
| 2002 | Deutsche Tourenwagen Masters | Abt Sportsline | 18 | 1 | 1 | 0 | 2 | 7 | 9th |
| 2003 | Deutsche Tourenwagen Masters | Abt Sportsline Junior | 9 | 0 | 0 | 0 | 0 | 1 | 16th |
| 2004 | Deutsche Tourenwagen Masters | Abt Sportsline | 10 | 0 | 2 | 0 | 4 | 39 | 5th |
| 2005 | Deutsche Tourenwagen Masters | Abt Sportsline | 11 | 0 | 0 | 1 | 0 | 10 | 13th |
| 2006 | Deutsche Tourenwagen Masters | Abt Sportsline | 10 | 1 | 1 | 0 | 3 | 42 | 4th |
| 2007 | Deutsche Tourenwagen Masters | Abt Sportsline | 10 | 2 | 2 | 2 | 4 | 40 | **3rd** |
| 2008 | Deutsche Tourenwagen Masters | Abt Sportsline | 11 | 0 | 0 | 1 | 1 | 32 | 7th |
| 2009 | Deutsche Tourenwagen Masters | Abt Sportsline | 10 | 1 | 1 | 0 | 4 | 35 | 6th |
| 2010 | Deutsche Tourenwagen Masters | Abt Sportsline | 11 | 0 | 0 | 0 | 0 | 20 | 8th |
| 2011 | Deutsche Tourenwagen Masters | Team Phoenix | 10 | 3 | 1 | 1 | 8 | 72 | **1st** |
| 2012 | Deutsche Tourenwagen Masters | BMW Team RMG | 10 | 0 | 0 | 1 | 3 | 69 | 8th |
| 2013 | Deutsche Tourenwagen Masters | BMW Team RMG | 10 | 0 | 0 | 0 | 0 | 10 | 19th |
| 2013 | 24 Hours of Nürburgring - SP9 | BMW Team Schubert | 1 | 0 | 0 | 0 | 0 | N/A | 6th |
| 2014 | Deutsche Tourenwagen Masters | BMW Team Schnitzer | 10 | 0 | 0 | 1 | 1 | 49 | 6th |
| 2014 | 24 Hours of Nürburgring - SP9 | BMW Sports Trophy Team Schubert | 1 | 0 | 0 | 0 | 0 | N/A | 6th |
| 2015 | Deutsche Tourenwagen Masters | BMW Team Schnitzer | 17 | 0 | 0 | 0 | 0 | 27 | 19th |
| 2015 | 24 Hours of Nürburgring - SP9 | BMW Sports Trophy Team Schubert | 1 | 0 | 0 | 0 | 0 | N/A | DNF |
| 2016 | Deutsche Tourenwagen Masters | BMW Team Schnitzer | 18 | 0 | 0 | 0 | 0 | 16 | 21st |
| 2016 | ADAC GT Masters | Schubert Motorsport | 4 | 0 | 0 | 0 | 0 | 14 | 35th |
| 2016 | 24 Hours of Nürburgring - SP9 | Schubert Motorsport | 1 | 0 | 0 | 0 | 0 | N/A | DNF |
| 2016 | Blancpain GT Series Endurance Cup | BMW Team Italia | 1 | 0 | 0 | 0 | 0 | 0 | NC |
| 2016 | Blancpain GT Series Endurance Cup | Rowe Racing | 1 | 0 | 0 | 0 | 0 | 0 | NC |
| 2017 | IMSA SportsCar Championship - GTLM | BMW Team RLL | 11 | 1 | 0 | 0 | 4 | 284 | 7th |
| 2017 | 24 Hours of Nürburgring - SP9 | BMW Team Schnitzer | 1 | 0 | 0 | 0 | 0 | N/A | 4th |
| 2018 | IMSA SportsCar Championship - GTD | Turner Motorsport | 1 | 0 | 0 | 0 | 0 | 17 | 58th |
| 2018 | 24 Hours of Le Mans - LMGTE Pro | BMW Team MTEK | 1 | 0 | 0 | 0 | 0 | N/A | 11th |
| 2018 | 24 Hours of Nürburgring - SP9 | Rowe Racing | 1 | 0 | 0 | 0 | 0 | N/A | DNF |
| 2018–19 | FIA World Endurance Championship - LMGTE Pro | BMW Team MTEK | 8 | 0 | 0 | 0 | 1 | 53 | 14th |
| 2019 | Intercontinental GT Challenge | BMW Team Schnitzer | 5 | 0 | 1 | 0 | 0 | 38 | 12th |
| 2019 | Blancpain GT Series Endurance Cup | BMW Team Schnitzer | 1 | 0 | 0 | 0 | 0 | 4 | 30th |
| 2019 | 24 Hours of Nürburgring - SP9 | BMW Team Schnitzer | 1 | 0 | 0 | 0 | 0 | N/A | DNF |
| 2019 | 24 Hours of Le Mans - LMGTE Pro | BMW Team MTEK | 1 | 0 | 0 | 0 | 0 | N/A | 13th |
| 2020 | Intercontinental GT Challenge | Walkenhorst Motorsport | 3 | 0 | 0 | 0 | 1 | 26 | 9th |
| 2020 | GT World Challenge Europe Endurance Cup | Walkenhorst Motorsport | 1 | 0 | 0 | 0 | 0 | 0 | NC |
| 2020 | 24 Hours of Nürburgring - SP9 | BMW Team Schnitzer | 1 | 0 | 0 | 0 | 1 | N/A | **3rd** |
| 2021 | GT World Challenge Europe Endurance Cup | Walkenhorst Motorsport | 5 | 0 | 0 | 0 | 0 | 9 | 22nd |
| 2021 | 24 Hours of Nürburgring - SP9 | Rowe Racing | 1 | 0 | 0 | 0 | 1 | N/A | **2nd** |
| 2023 | 24 Hours of Nürburgring - SP9 | Audi Sport Team Scherer PHX | 1 | 0 | 0 | 0 | 0 | N/A | 12th |

^{‡} Does not include non-championship races. ^{*} Season still in progress.

=== Complete Deutsche Tourenwagen Masters results ===
(key)

| Year | Team | Car | 1 | 2 | 3 | 4 | 5 | 6 | 7 | 8 | 9 | 10 | 11 | 12 | 13 | 14 | 15 | 16 | 17 | 18 | 19 | 20 | Pos. | Pts |
|---|---|---|---|---|---|---|---|---|---|---|---|---|---|---|---|---|---|---|---|---|---|---|---|---|
| 2001 | Abt Sportsline Junior | Abt-Audi TT-R | HOC; QR; 20 | HOC; CR; Ret | NÜR; QR; 2 | NÜR; CR; 4 | OSC; QR; 10 | OSC; CR; 20† | SAC; QR; 21 | SAC; CR; 7 | NOR; QR; 16 | NOR; CR; 10 | LAU; QR; Ret | LAU; CR; 6 | NÜR; QR; 9 | NÜR; CR; Ret | A1R; QR; 6 | A1R; CR; Ret | ZAN; QR; 16 | ZAN; CR; Ret | HOC; QR; Ret | HOC; CR; 16 | 13th | 23 |
| 2002 | Abt Sportsline | Abt-Audi TT-R | HOC; QR; 1 | **HOC**; **CR**; Ret | **ZOL**; **QR**; 21† | ZOL; CR; Ret | DON; QR; 2 | DON; CR; Ret | SAC; QR; 4 | SAC; CR; Ret | NOR; QR; DNS | NOR; CR; DNS | LAU; QR; 5 | LAU; CR; 9 | NÜR; QR; 10 | NÜR; CR; 5 | A1R; QR; 6 | A1R; CR; Ret | ZAN; QR; 11 | ZAN; CR; 18 | HOC; QR; Ret | HOC; CR; Ret | 11th | 7 |
| 2003 | Abt Sportsline Junior | Abt-Audi TT-R 2002 | HOC; 12 | ADR; Ret | NÜR; 18 | LAU; DNS | NOR; 18 | DON; Ret | NÜR; Ret | A1R; 8 | ZAN; Ret | HOC; 13 | | | | | | | | | | | 16th | 1 |
| 2004 | Abt Sportsline | Audi A4 DTM 2004 | HOC; 5 | EST; 3 | ADR; 8 | LAU; 14 | NOR; 5 | SHA^{1} Ret | NÜR; Ret | **OSC**; 2 | ZAN; 2 | BRN; Ret | **HOC**; 2 | | | | | | | | | | 5th | 39 |
| 2005 | Abt Sportsline | Audi A4 DTM 2005 | HOC; Ret | LAU; 12 | SPA; 6 | BRN; 14 | OSC; Ret | NOR; 5 | NÜR; 11 | ZAN; 6 | LAU; 10 | IST; 16† | HOC; Ret | | | | | | | | | | 13th | 10 |
| 2006 | Abt Sportsline | Audi A4 DTM 2006 | HOC; 7 | LAU; 8 | OSC; 6 | BRH; 4 | NOR; 16† | NÜR; 3 | ZAN; 3 | **CAT**; 1 | BUG; 4 | HOC; 5 | | | | | | | | | | | 4th | 42 |
| 2007 | Abt Sportsline | Audi A4 DTM 2007 | HOC; 2 | OSC; 5 | LAU; 9 | BRH; 2 | NOR; Ret | MUG; Ret | ZAN; 1 | **NÜR**; 1 | **CAT**; Ret | HOC; 9 | | | | | | | | | | | **3rd** | **40** |
| 2008 | Abt Sportsline | Audi A4 DTM 2008 | HOC; 5 | OSC; 2 | MUG; 17 | LAU; 4 | NOR; Ret | ZAN; 4 | NÜR; Ret | BRH; 5 | CAT; 4 | BUG; Ret | HOC; 8 | | | | | | | | | | 7th | 32 |
| 2009 | Abt Sportsline | Audi A4 DTM 2009 | HOC; Ret | LAU; Ret | NOR; 11 | ZAN; 4 | OSC; 3 | **NÜR**; 1 | BRH; 3 | CAT; 3 | DIJ; 7 | HOC; Ret | | | | | | | | | | | 6th | 35 |
| 2010 | Abt Sportsline | Audi A4 DTM 2009 | HOC; 17† | VAL; DSQ | LAU; 6 | NOR; 8 | NÜR; 13 | ZAN; 8 | BRH; 7 | OSC; 8 | HOC; 5 | ADR; 6 | SHA; 4 | | | | | | | | | | 8th | 20 |
| 2011 | Team Phoenix | Audi A4 DTM 2008 | HOC; 5 | ZAN; 3 | **SPL**; 1 | LAU; 1 | NOR; 3 | NÜR; 5 | BRH; 1 | OSC; 2 | VAL; 3 | HOC; 2 | | | | | | | | | | | **1st** | **72** |
| 2012 | BMW Team RMG | BMW M3 DTM | HOC; Ret | LAU; 7 | BRH; 4 | SPL; 2 | NOR; 2 | NÜR; 3 | ZAN; Ret | OSC; Ret | VAL; Ret | HOC; 14 | | | | | | | | | | | 8th | 69 |
| 2013 | BMW Team RMG | BMW M3 DTM | HOC; 13 | BRH; 14 | SPL; Ret | LAU; 19 | NOR; Ret | MSC; 17 | NÜR; 5 | OSC; 20† | ZAN; 11 | HOC; 19 | | | | | | | | | | | 19th | 10 |
| 2014 | BMW Team Schnitzer | BMW M4 DTM | HOC; 7 | OSC; 9 | HUN; 13 | NOR; Ret | MSC; 13 | SPL; 4 | NÜR; 8 | LAU; 8 | ZAN; 3 | HOC; 7 | | | | | | | | | | | 6th | 49 |
| 2015 | BMW Team Schnitzer | BMW M4 DTM | HOC; 1 Ret | HOC; 2; 4 | LAU; 1; 12 | LAU; 2; 11 | NOR; 1; 6 | NOR; 2; 11 | ZAN; 1 Ret | ZAN; 2 Ret | SPL; 1 Ret | SPL; 2; 12 | MSC; 1; 17 | MSC; 2 Ret | OSC; 1; 8 | OSC; 2; 20 | NÜR; 1 WD | NÜR; 2; 9 | HOC; 1; 15 | HOC; 2; 10 | | | 19th | 27 |
| 2016 | BMW Team Schnitzer | BMW M4 DTM | HOC; 1; 12 | HOC; 2; 9 | SPL; 1; 5 | SPL; 2; 19 | LAU; 1 Ret | LAU; 2; 18 | NOR; 1; 12 | NOR; 2; 10 | ZAN; 1; 19 | ZAN; 2; 11 | MSC; 1; 21 | MSC; 2; 23 | NÜR; 1; 16 | NÜR; 2; 12 | HUN; 1; 23 | HUN; 2; 9 | HOC; 1; 20 | HOC; 2; 10 | | | 21st | 16 |

^{†} Retired, but was classified as he completed 90% of the winner's race distance. ^{1} - A non-championship one-off race was held in 2004 at the streets of Shanghai, China.

=== Complete WeatherTech SportsCar Championship results ===
(key) (Races in bold indicate pole position) (Races in italics indicate fastest lap)

| Year | Entrant | Class | Car | Engine | 1 | 2 | 3 | 4 | 5 | 6 | 7 | 8 | 9 | 10 | 11 | Rank | Points | Ref |
|---|---|---|---|---|---|---|---|---|---|---|---|---|---|---|---|---|---|---|
| 2017 | BMW Team RLL | GTLM | BMW M6 GTLM | BMW 4.4 L Turbo V8 | DAY; 11 | SEB; 9 | LBH; 7 | COA; 3 | WGL; 8 | MOS; 2 | LIM; 3 | ELK; 7 | VIR; 9 | LGA; 1 | PET; 9 | 7th | 284 | |
| 2018 | Turner Motorsport | GTD | BMW M6 GT3 | BMW 4.4 L Turbo V8 | DAY; 14 | SEB | MDO | DET | WGL | MOS | LIM | ELK | VIR | LGA | PET | 58th | 17 | |

=== Complete FIA World Endurance Championship results ===
(key) (Races in bold indicate pole position; races in italics indicate fastest lap)

| Year | Entrant | Class | Chassis | Engine | 1 | 2 | 3 | 4 | 5 | 6 | 7 | 8 | Rank | Points |
|---|---|---|---|---|---|---|---|---|---|---|---|---|---|---|
| 2018–19 | BMW Team MTEK | LMGTE Pro | BMW M8 GTE | BMW S63 4.0 L Turbo V8 | SPA; 8 | LMS; 9 | SIL; 5 | FUJ; 7 | SHA; 8 | SEB; 2 | SPA; 9 | LMS; 15 | 14th | 53 |

=== Complete 24 Hours of Le Mans results ===
| Year | Team | Co-Drivers | Car | Class | Laps | Pos. | Class Pos. |
|---|---|---|---|---|---|---|---|
| 2018 | (Germany) BMW Team MTEK | (Netherlands) Nicky Catsburg (Austria) Philipp Eng | BMW M8 GTE | GTE; Pro | 332 | 33rd | 11th |
| 2019 | (Germany) BMW Team MTEK | (Netherlands) Nicky Catsburg (Austria) Philipp Eng | BMW M8 GTE | GTE; Pro | 309 | 47th | 13th |

Sporting positions
| Preceded by Paul di Resta | Deutsche Tourenwagen Masters; Champion; 2011 | Succeeded by Bruno Spengler |
