= Racing Bart Mampaey =

Racing team in Belgium

(Belgium) Racing Bart Mampaey
- Founded: 1994
- Folded: 2020
- Team principal(s): Bart Mampaey
- Former series: World Touring Car Championship, Deutsche Tourenwagen Masters
- Drivers' Championships: 2004 ETCC (Priaulx); 2005, 2006 and 2007 WTCC (Priaulx)

Racing Bart Mampaey (formerly Juma Racing) was a racing team based in Mechelen, Belgium. It managed the BMW Team RBM operation in the Deutsche Tourenwagen Masters. Previously the team had been racing in the European Touring Car Championship and World Touring Car Championship.

== History ==
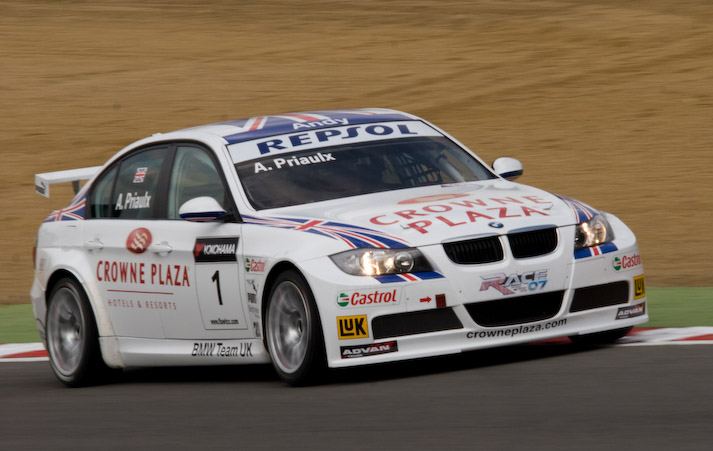
Andy Priaulx driving a BMW 320si for Racing Bart Mampaey at Brands Hatch in 2008

The team was formed as Juma Racing in 1974 by Julien Mampaey, the father of future team principal Bart Mampaey. Among their achievements were three wins with BMW in the Spa 24 Hours, in 1977, 1982 and 1983.

Bart Mampaey went on to create his own RBM team in 1994 which started competing in the BMW Compact Cup. They finished first and second in the Group N Spa 24 Hours in 1997, and ran the BMW Fina Bastos Team to overall victory in 1998, with Marc Duez, Eric van de Poele and Alain Cudini.

=== European Touring Car Championship ===
Team RBM started racing in the European Touring Car Championship in 2002, fielding a BMW 320i for Swede Fredrik Ekblom under the name BMW Team Belgium, who scored three podiums and finished sixth in the standings. Andy Priaulx joined the team for 2003 and the team claimed three race wins under the new banner of BMW Team UK. Priaulx went on to win the drivers title the following year, when it ran a second 320i for Kurt Mollekens under the BMW Team Belgium-Luxembourg banner.

=== World Touring Car Championship ===
The ETCC became the WTCC in 2005 and Priaulx became world champion, before successfully defending his crown again in 2006 and 2007. Occasionally the team has run a second car, once for Dutchman Duncan Huisman at Macau in 2005, for Dane Jan Magnussen at Macau in 2006 and for Swede Fredrik Ekblom at Anderstorp, Monza and Macau in 2007. In 2010, BMW scaled down to a two car effort, with Andy Priaulx and Augusto Farfus driving. At the end of 2010 BMW Motorsport stopped its WTCC commitment to focus on its DTM return.

RBM was responsible for the design, development and construction of 52 cars for the MINI Challenge, together with the production of numerous MINI Challenge kits for the Belgian, Luxembourg, German and other international MINI championships.

=== Deutsche Tourenwagen Masters ===
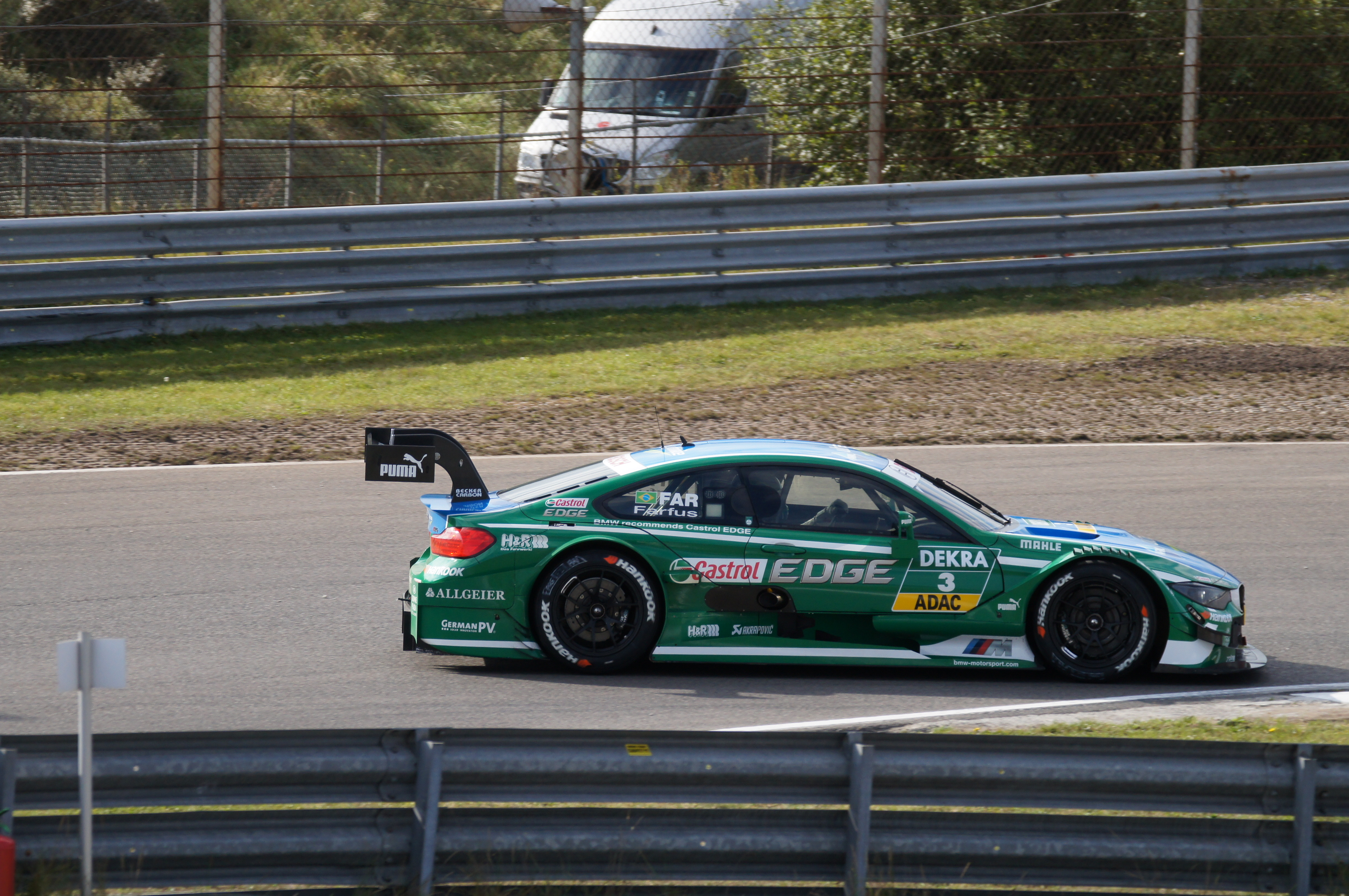
BMW M4 DTM, driven by Augusto Farfus at Zandvoort in 2014

At the end of 2010 BMW announced that it would return in the DTM for the 2012 season. RBM was part of the building and developing of the new BMW M3 DTM before running a pair of them in 2012. The two drivers for the season were Augusto Farfus and Andy Priaulx, who both had previously been driving for RBM in the WTCC. At the penultimate round of the season in Valencia Farfus scored the first win for the team. He finished seventh in the final drivers’ standings, as second of the BMW drivers, collecting the unofficial title of ‘Rookie of the Year’. During the 2013 season Farfus was able to collect three wins and 5 podiums which allowed him to finish second in the drivers’ standings. That season RBM also managed to finish runner-up in the teams’ classification.

From 2017 on BMW decided to reduce the number of cars it entered to 6 distributed over two teams. Therefore, both BMW Team RBM and BMW Team RMG entered a third car under the BMW Team RMR banner. Between 2014 and 2020 RBM scored seven more wins as well as several more podiums in the DTM.

After 2020, the DTM switched to GT3 regulations, and BMW withdrew its factory program from the category. Consequently, RBM ceased operations. Since then, Mampaey has focused on external motorsport consultancy.

== Results & achievements ==
=== Complete Deutsche Tourenwagen Masters results (except for 2020) ===
(key)

Year	Entrant	Car	No	Driver	1	2	3	4	5	6	7	8	9	10	11	12	13	14	15	16	17	18	19	20	Pos	Points
2012	BMW Team RBM	BMW M3 DTM	15	(United Kingdom) Andy Priaulx	HOC; 6	LAU; 17	BRH; Ret	SPL; Ret	NOR; 7	NÜR; 19	ZAN; 13	OSC; Ret	VAL; 8	HOC; 7											13th	24
2012	BMW Team RBM	BMW M3 DTM	16	(Brazil) Augusto Farfus	HOC; 15	LAU; 3	BRH; 11	SPL; 10	NOR; Ret	NÜR; 10	ZAN; 9	OSC; 5	VAL; 1	HOC; 3											7th	69
2013	BMW Team RBM	BMW M3 DTM	7	(Brazil) Augusto Farfus	HOC; 1	BRH; Ret	SPL; 6	LAU; 12	NOR; 16	MSC; 3	NÜR; 2	OSC; 1	ZAN; 1	HOC; 11											2nd	116
2013	BMW Team RBM	BMW M3 DTM	8	(United States) Joey Hand	HOC; 7	BRH; 5	SPL; Ret	LAU; 15	NOR; 8	MSC; 7	NÜR; Ret	OSC; 16	ZAN; 7	HOC; 20											12th	32
2014	BMW Team RBM	BMW M4 DTM	3	(Brazil) Augusto Farfus	HOC; 8	OSC; 5	HUN; 21†	NOR; 14	MSC; 10	SPL; 2	NÜR; Ret	LAU; 7	ZAN; Ret	HOC; 16											13th	39
2014	BMW Team RBM	BMW M4 DTM	4	(United States) Joey Hand	HOC; 10	OSC; 15	HUN; 15	NOR; 7	MSC; 17	SPL; 12	NÜR; 14	LAU; 11	ZAN; 10	HOC; 15											20th	8
2015	BMW Team RBM	BMW M4 DTM	18	(Brazil) Augusto Farfus	HOC; 1; 10	HOC; 2; 21	LAU; 1 Ret	LAU; 2 Ret	NOR; 1; 8	NOR; 2 Ret	ZAN; 1; 4	ZAN; 2; 2	SPL; 1; 6	SPL; 2; 18	MSC; 1; 15	MSC; 2; 11	OSC; 1; 4	OSC; 2; 2	NÜR; 1; 18	NÜR; 2; 8	HOC; 1 Ret	HOC; 2; 14			12th	77
2015	BMW Team RBM	BMW M4 DTM	31	(United Kingdom) Tom Blomqvist	HOC; 1 Ret	HOC; 2; 17	LAU; 1; 22	LAU; 2 Ret	NOR; 1 Ret	NOR; 2 DSQ	ZAN; 1; 7	ZAN; 2; 18	SPL; 1; 17	SPL; 2; 22†	MSC; 1; 8	MSC; 2; 12	OSC; 1; 7	OSC; 2; 1	NÜR; 1 Ret	NÜR; 2; 4	HOC; 1; 7	HOC; 2; 17			14th	59
2016	BMW Team RBM	BMW M4 DTM	31	(United Kingdom) Tom Blomqvist	HOC; 1; 13	HOC; 2; 6	SPL; 1; 2	SPL; 2; 6	LAU; 1; 22	LAU; 2; 11	NOR; 1; 15	NOR; 2; 2	ZAN; 1; 16	ZAN; 2; 10	MSC; 1; 22	MSC; 2; 2	NÜR; 1; 2	NÜR; 2; 8	HUN; 1; 22	HUN; 1; 4	HOC; 1; 9	HOC; 2; 7			6th	113
2016	BMW Team RBM	BMW M4 DTM	36	(Belgium) Maxime Martin	HOC; 1; 8	HOC; 2; 3	SPL; 1; 6	SPL; 2; 5	LAU; 1; 9	LAU; 2; 13	NOR; 1; 6	NOR; 2; 3	ZAN; 1; 10	ZAN; 2 Ret	MSC; 1; 6	MSC; 2; 17	NÜR; 1; 8	NÜR; 2; 10	HUN; 1; 13	HUN; 1; 7	HOC; 1; 13	HOC; 2; 6			8th	90
2017	BMW Team RBM	BMW M4 DTM	31	(United Kingdom) Tom Blomqvist	HOC; 1; 16	HOC; 2; 12	LAU; 1; 17	LAU; 2; 17^{2}	HUN; 1; 15†	HUN; 1; 13	NOR; 1; 6	NOR; 2; 9^{1}	MSC; 1 Ret	MSC; 2; 7	ZAN; 1 Ret	ZAN; 2; 13	NÜR; 1; 16	NÜR; 2; 10	SPL; 1; 16	SPL; 2; 13	HOC; 1; 15	HOC; 2 Ret^{1}			17th	25
2017	BMW Team RBM	BMW M4 DTM	36	(Belgium) Maxime Martin	HOC; 1; 11	HOC; 2 Ret	LAU; 1; 4^{3}	LAU; 2; 8	HUN; 1 Ret	HUN; 1; 3	NOR; 1; 2^{1}	NOR; 2; 1	MSC; 1; 16	MSC; 2 Ret	ZAN; 1; 3	ZAN; 2; 6^{3}	NÜR; 1; 17	NÜR; 2; 11	SPL; 1; 6	SPL; 2; 11	HOC; 1; 4^{2}	HOC; 2; 6			8th	132
2017	BMW Team RMR	BMW M4 DTM	7	(Canada) Bruno Spengler	HOC; 1; 12	HOC; 2; 9	LAU; 1; 14	LAU; 2; 16	HUN; 1; 3	HUN; 1; 14	NOR; 1; 1^{3}	NOR; 2; 12	MSC; 1; 12	MSC; 2; 3^{1}	ZAN; 1; 14	ZAN; 2; 10	NÜR; 1; 13	NÜR; 2; 4	SPL; 1; 12	SPL; 2; 16	HOC; 1; 10	HOC; 2; 14			13th	75
2018	BMW Team RBM	BMW M4 DTM	7	(Canada) Bruno Spengler	HOC; 1; 6	HOC; 2; 8	LAU; 1; 5^{3}	LAU; 2; 15	HUN; 1; 12	HUN; 1 DSQ	NOR; 1; 6	NOR; 2; 4	ZAN; 1; 12	ZAN; 2; 13	BRH; 1; 17	BRH; 2; 14	MIS; 1 Ret	MIS; 2; 11	NÜR; 1; 2^{3}	NÜR; 2; 4	SPL; 1 Ret	SPL; 2; 14	HOC; 1; 9	HOC; 2; 6	12th	85
2018	BMW Team RBM	BMW M4 DTM	47	(Sweden) Joel Eriksson	HOC; 1; 12	HOC; 2; 4^{3}	LAU; 1; 12	LAU; 2; 9	HUN; 1; 17	HUN; 1; 6	NOR; 1; 9	NOR; 2; 12	ZAN; 1; 9	ZAN; 2; 11	BRH; 1; 14	BRH; 2; 13	MIS; 1; 12	MIS; 2; 1	NÜR; 1; 12	NÜR; 2; 6	SPL; 1; 15	SPL; 2; 5	HOC; 1; 9	HOC; 2; 6	14th	72
2018	BMW Team RMR	BMW M4 DTM	25	(Austria) Philipp Eng	HOC; 1; 16	HOC; 2; 14	LAU; 1; 3^{2}	LAU; 2; 7^{1}	HUN; 1; 18	HUN; 1; 3	NOR; 1; 5^{2}	NOR; 2; 11	ZAN; 1; 14	ZAN; 2; 4^{2}	BRH; 1; 5	BRH; 2; 7	MIS; 1; 8	MIS; 2; 16	NÜR; 1; 16	NÜR; 2; 8^{3}	SPL; 1; 8	SPL; 2; 9	HOC; 1; 12	HOC; 2; 8	9th	102
2019	BMW Team RBM	BMW M4 Turbo DTM	31	(South Africa) Sheldon van der Linde	HOC; 1; 6	HOC; 2; 13	ZOL; 1; 11	ZOL; 1; 5^{1}	MIS; 1; 9	MIS; 2; 9	NOR; 1 Ret	NOR; 2 Ret	ASS; 1; 10	ASS; 2; 15	BRH; 1; 8	BRH; 2; 7	LAU; 1; 16	LAU; 2; 11	NÜR; 1; 7	NÜR; 2; 16	HOC; 1; 16	HOC; 2; 13			13th	42
2019	BMW Team RBM	BMW M4 Turbo DTM	47	(Sweden) Joel Eriksson	HOC; 1; 13	HOC; 2; 10	ZOL; 1; 2	ZOL; 1; 10	MIS; 1 Ret	MIS; 2; 6	NOR; 1; 3	NOR; 2; 13	ASS; 1; 16	ASS; 2; 16†	BRH; 1 DNS	BRH; 2 Ret	LAU; 1; 8	LAU; 2; 13	NÜR; 1; 8	NÜR; 2; 11	HOC; 1; 10	HOC; 2; 6			11th	61
2019	BMW Team RMR	BMW M4 Turbo DTM	25	(Austria) Philipp Eng	HOC; 1; 14	HOC; 2; 4^{1}	ZOL; 1; 1	ZOL; 1; 2^{3}	MIS; 1; 7	MIS; 2; 2	NOR; 1; 7	NOR; 2; 5	ASS; 1; 4	ASS; 2; 13	BRH; 1; 6	BRH; 2; 5	LAU; 1; 5	LAU; 2; 10	NÜR; 1; 13	NÜR; 2; 8	HOC; 1 Ret	HOC; 2; 14			6th	144

* Season still in progress. ^{†} Driver did not finish, but completed 75% of the race distance.
