= Team MTEK =

(Germany) BMW Team MTEK
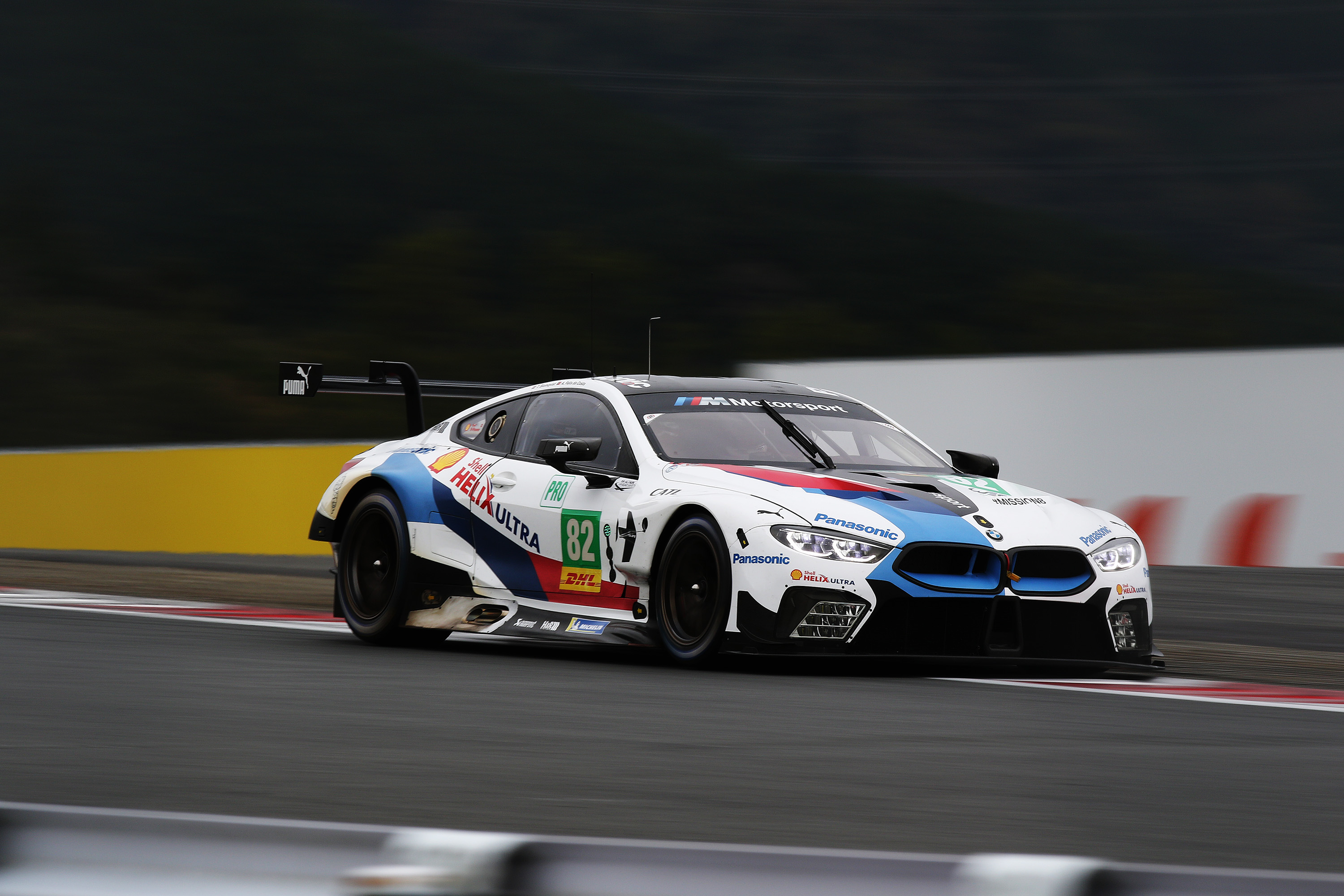
- Founded: 2012
- Base: Amsterdam, Netherlands
- Team principal(s): Ernest Knoors
- Former series: FIA World Endurance Championship; Deutsche Tourenwagen Masters

Team MTEK (commonly known as BMW Team MTEK) is a racing team located in Amsterdam, Netherlands.

== History ==
Team MTEK was founded in 2012 by Ernest Knoors. After a stint with the BMW Sauber squad Knoors, joined Scuderia Ferrari. With Ferrari the Dutchman was responsible for the customer engines supplied to Scuderia Toro Rosso, Sauber and other teams. He returned to BMW in 2012 forming Team MTEK, a BMW supported DTM entry. After BMW's return to DTM in 2012, Team MTEK joined in the 2013 season along with BMW factory supported entry's by Team RMG, Team RBM and Team Schnitzer.

=== 2013 season ===
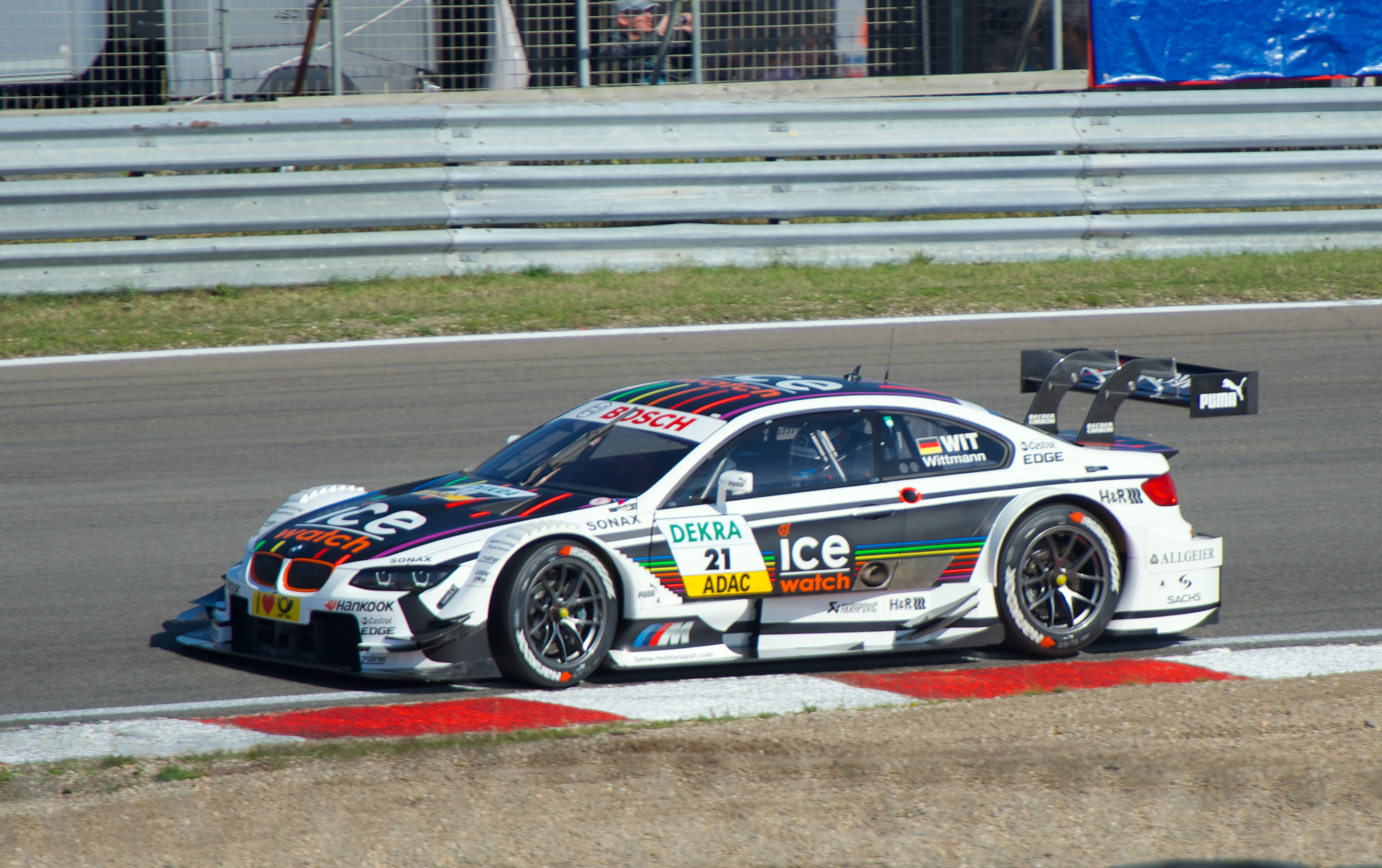
Marco Wittmann at Zandvoort in 2013

For its debut season the team started with two rookies to the series, Timo Glock and Marco Wittmann. Glock left Formula 1 in 2012 to join the DTM series in 2013. Wittmann was a former Formula 3 Euro Series race winner who converted to GT racing in 2012. In 2012 Wittmann ran the VLN championship in a BMW supported entry.

The teams first (double) podium came at the Red Bull Ring scoring a second (Wittmann) and third (Glock) finish. Glock also won the season finale at the Hockenheimring. Team MTEK finished seventh in the team championship, third out of four BMW teams.

=== 2014 season ===
For 2014 the team retained Glock but replaced Wittmann by António Félix da Costa. BMW replaced the BMW M3 DTM with the BMW M4 DTM. The team struggled with the new car. Glock's best result was a third place at the Red Bull Ring. Félix da Costa struggled scoring points in his rookie season, he did so on two occasions. The team finished eleventh in the team standings.

=== 2015 season ===
Bruno Spengler joined Team MTEK in 2015 coming over from Mercedes' HWA Team. The 2012 season champion scored six podium finishes ending fifth in the drivers' championship. Glock scored a sole win at Oschersleben. The team finished fourth in the team standings.

== Racing record ==
=== 24 Hours of Le Mans results ===
Year	Entrant	No.	Car	Drivers	Class	Laps	Pos.	Class Pos.
2018	(Germany) BMW Team MTEK	81	BMW M8 GTE	(Netherlands) Nicky Catsburg (Austria) Philipp Eng (Germany) Martin Tomczyk	LMGTE Pro	332	33rd	11th
2018	(Germany) BMW Team MTEK	82	BMW M8 GTE	(Brazil) Augusto Farfus (Portugal) António Félix da Costa (United Kingdom) Alexander Sims	LMGTE Pro	223	DNF	DNF
2019	(Germany) BMW Team MTEK	81	BMW M8 GTE	(Netherlands) Nicky Catsburg (Austria) Philipp Eng (Germany) Martin Tomczyk	LMGTE Pro	309	47th	13th
2019	(Germany) BMW Team MTEK	82	BMW M8 GTE	(Brazil) Augusto Farfus (Portugal) António Félix da Costa (Finland) Jesse Krohn	LMGTE Pro	335	30th	10th

== Gallery ==
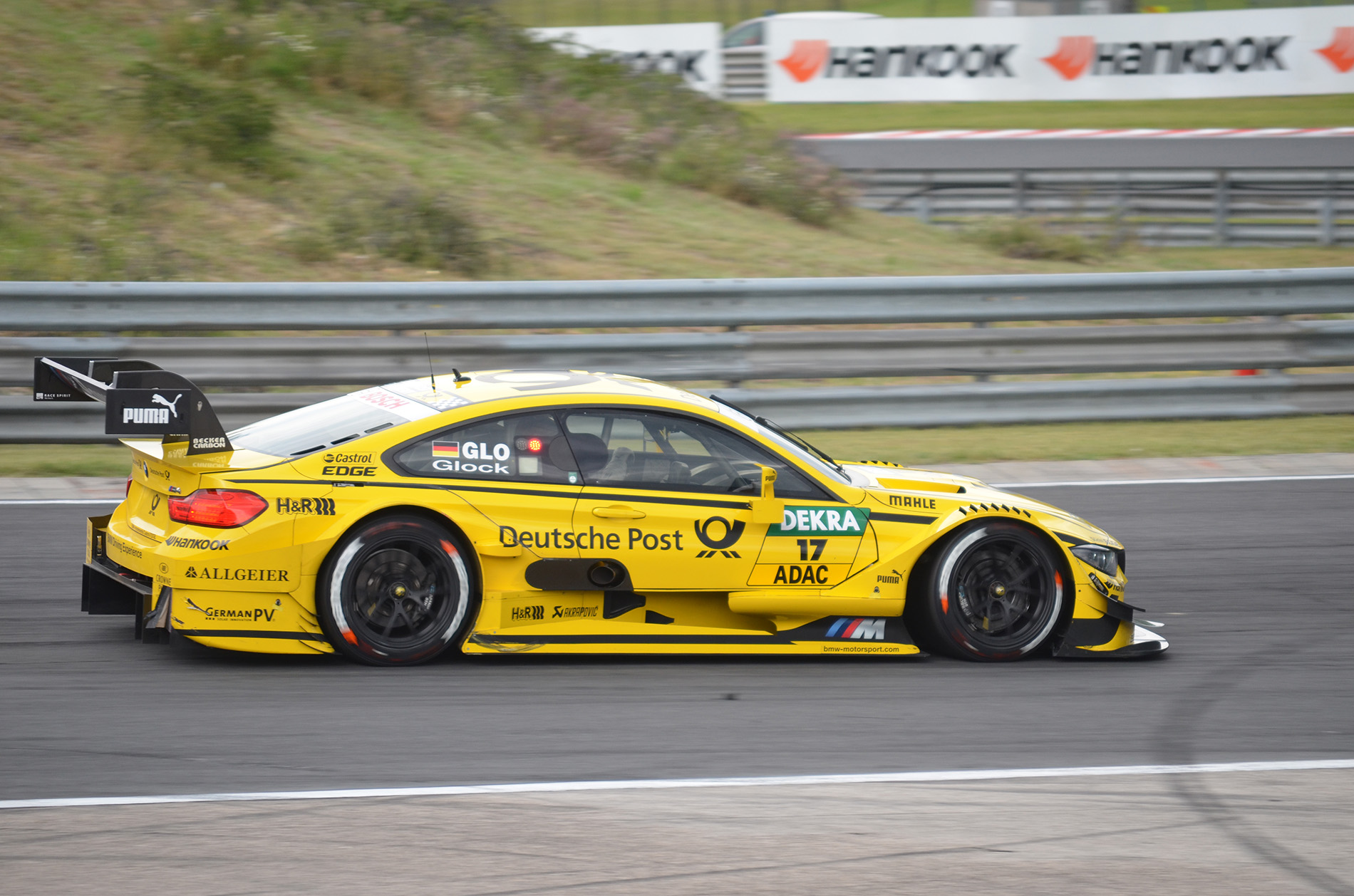
Timo Glock at the Hungaroring 2013

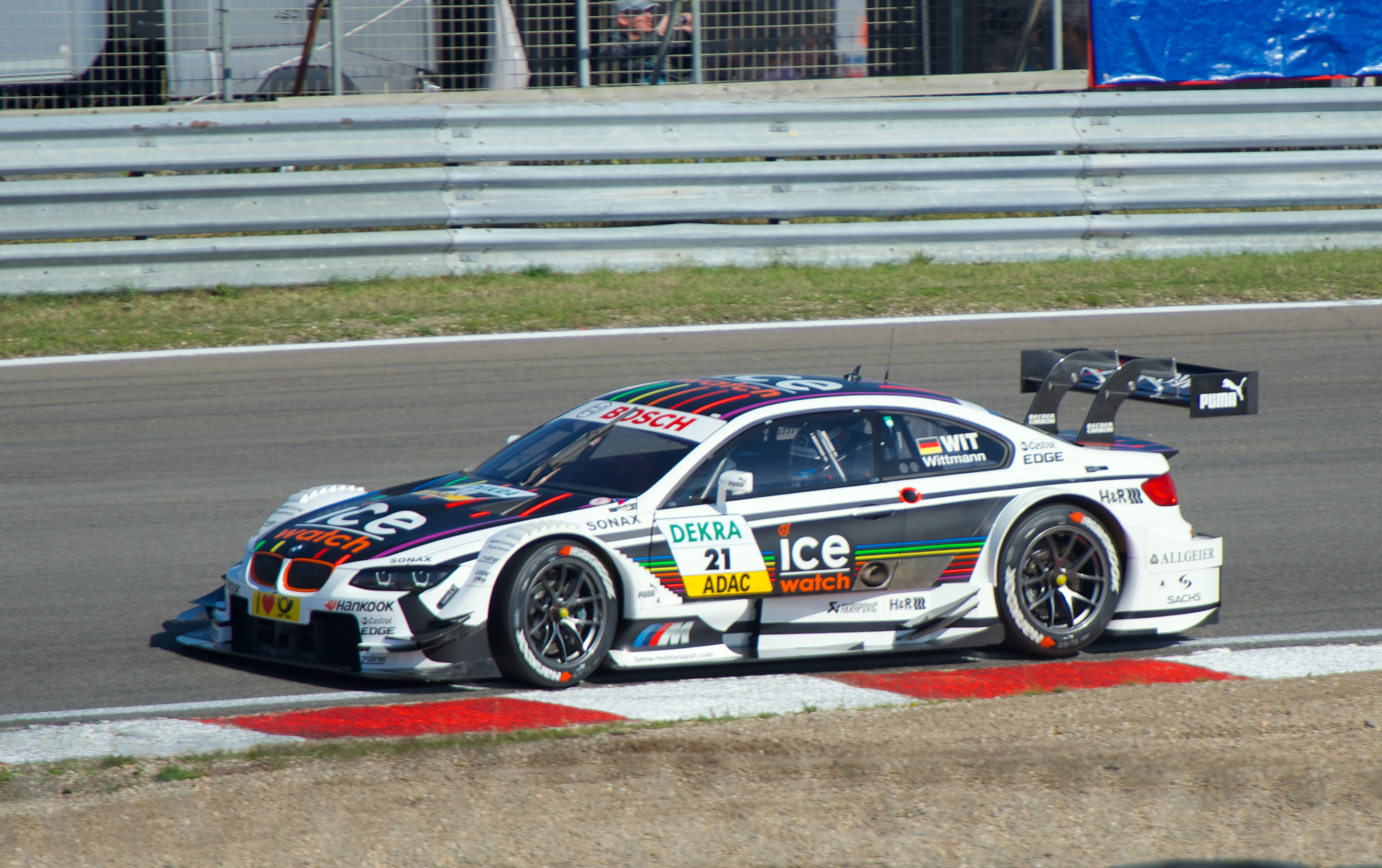
Marco Wittmann at Zandvoort 2013

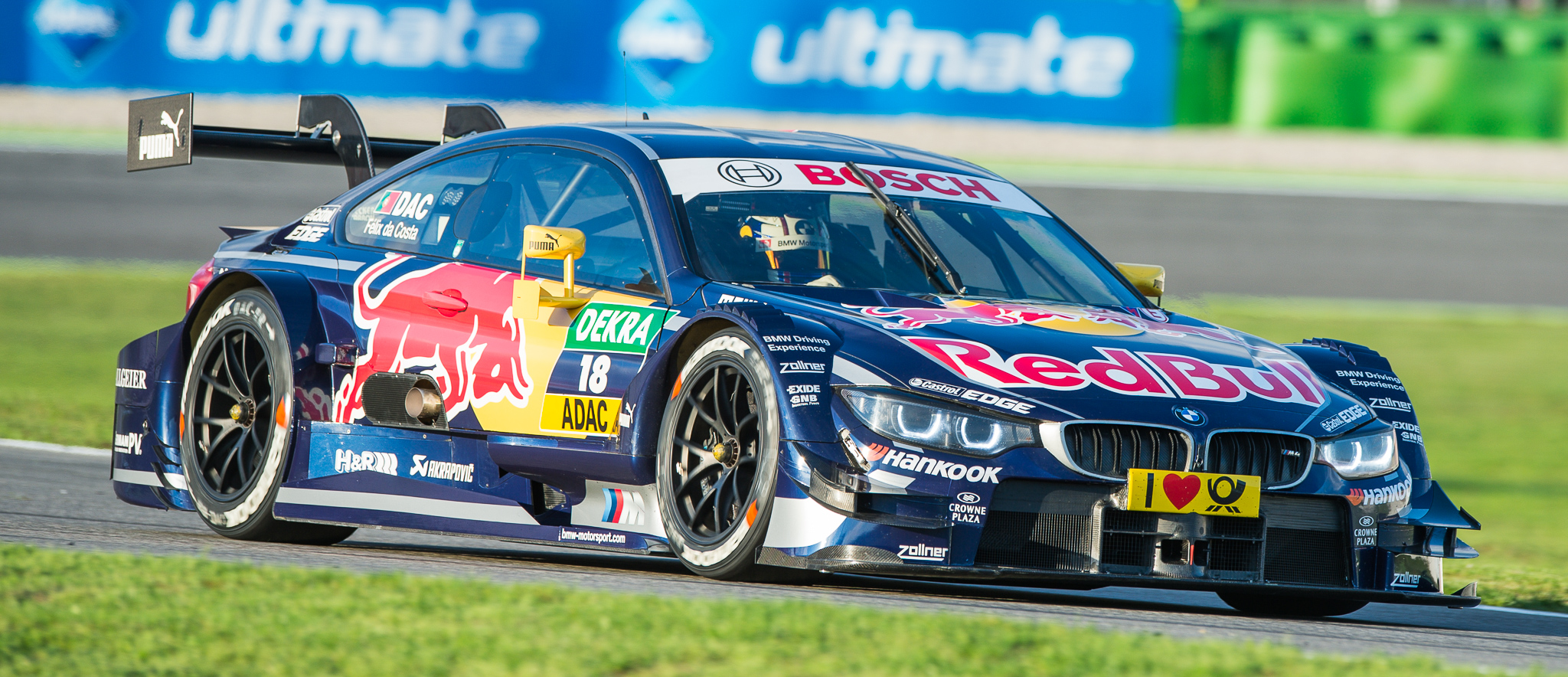
Antonio Félix da Costa at the Hockenheimring 2014

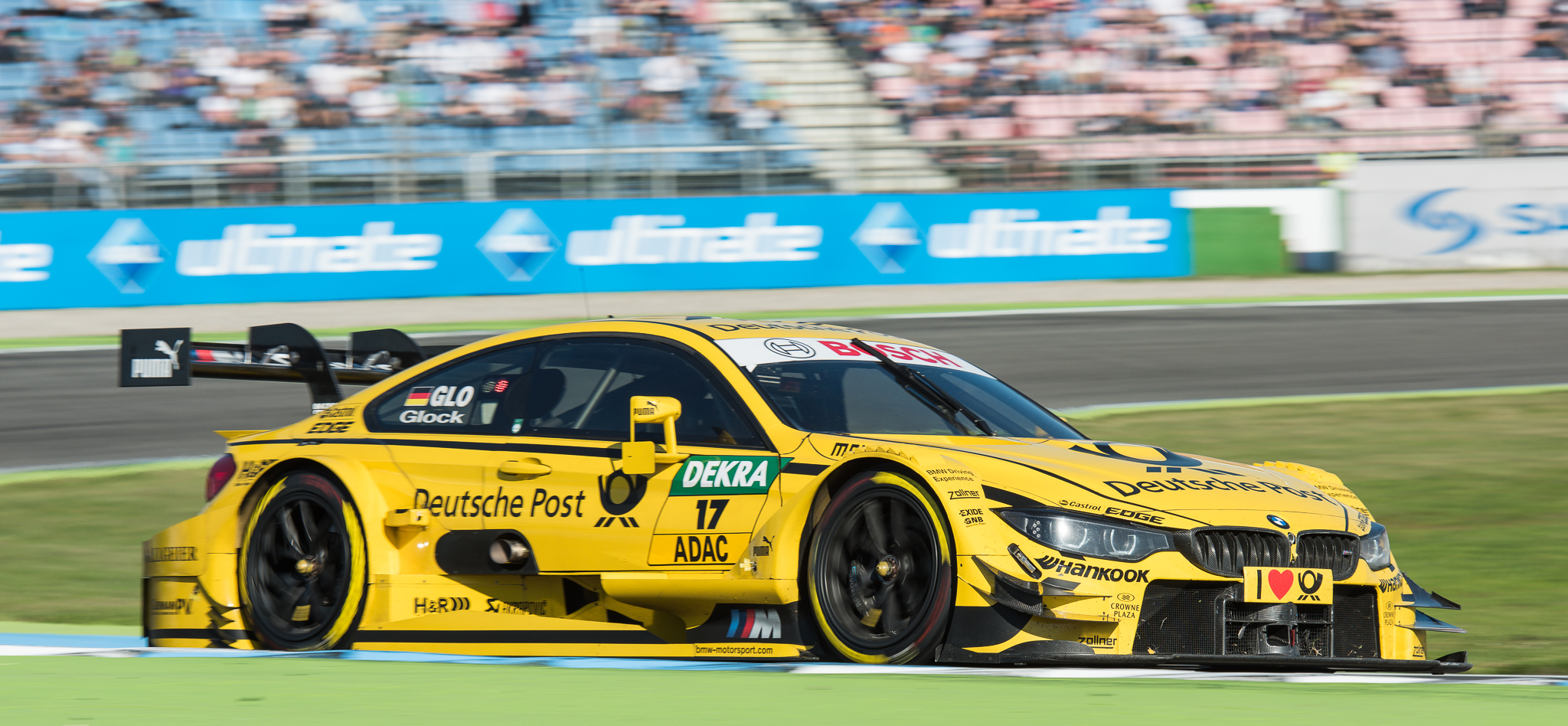
Timo Glock at the Hockenheimring 2014
