= 2019 Super GT x DTM Dream Race =

(Japan) Super GT x DTM Dream Race
Event Information
- Date: 22–24 November 2019
- Location: Oyama, Suntō District, Shizuoka Prefecture, Japan
- Venue: Fuji Speedway

Results
Race 1
Distance	34 laps	155.142 km
Pole position	(New Zealand) Nick Cassidy; TOM'S	1:41.827
Winner	(New Zealand) Nick Cassidy; TOM'S	57:45.326
Race 2
Distance	31 laps	141.453 km
Pole position	(Japan) Daisuke Nakajima^{A} Mugen Motorsports	1:46.696
Winner	(India) Narain Karthikeyan; Nakajima Racing	57:38.362

The 2019 Super GT x DTM Dream Race (commercially titled AUTOBACS 45th Anniversary presents SUPER GT x DTM Dream Race) was a motor racing event held on the weekend of 22–24 November 2019. The event was held at Fuji Speedway in Japan, and consisted of two 55-minute + 1 lap races.

== Background ==
The non-championship event was held by sister series Super GT and Deutsche Tourenwagen Masters, which collaborated on the second generation of Class One Touring Cars. As Super GT would debut the Class One cars in 2020, this was the final time the original GT500 cars were used.

Six DTM cars were freighted to Japan for the event – three Audis and three BMWs. Having struggled with costs and development in their debut DTM season, Aston Martin and R-Motorsport elected not to send any of their Vantages – Aston Martin later quit the DTM prior to the start of the 2020 season.

== Results ==
=== Qualifying 1 ===
Pos.	No.	Driver	Team	Car	Time
1	37	(New Zealand) Nick Cassidy	TOM'S	Lexus LC500 GT500	1:41.827
2	28	(France) Loïc Duval	Phoenix Racing	Audi RS5 Turbo DTM	+0.331
3	1	(Japan) Naoki Yamamoto	Team Kunimitsu	Honda NSX-GT	+0.388
4	23	(Italy) Ronnie Quintarelli	Nismo	Nissan GT-R Nismo GT500	+0.531
5	99	(Germany) Mike Rockenfeller	Abt Sportsline	Audi RS5 Turbo DTM	+0.700
6	17	(Japan) Koudai Tsukakoshi	REAL Racing	Honda NSX-GT	+0.782
7	24	(United Kingdom) Jann Mardenborough	Kondo Racing	Nissan GT-R Nismo GT500	+0.897
8	3	(France) Frédéric Makowiecki	B-Max Racing	Nissan GT-R Nismo GT500	+0.958
9	19	(Japan) Sho Tsuboi	Racing Project Bandoh	Lexus LC500 GT500	+0.983
10	36	(Japan) Yuhi Sekiguchi	SARD	Lexus LC500 GT500	+1.060
11	6	(Japan) Kenta Yamashita	Team LeMans	Lexus LC500 GT500	+1.100
12	12	(Japan) Daiki Sasaki	Team Impul	Nissan GT-R Nismo GT500	+1.237
13	8	(Japan) Takuya Izawa	ARTA	Honda NSX-GT	+1.294
14	33	(Germany) René Rast	Team Rosberg	Audi RS5 Turbo DTM	+1.560
15	38	(Japan) Yuji Tachikawa	Cerumo	Lexus LC500 GT500	+1.585
16	21	(France) Benoît Tréluyer	Team WRT	Audi RS5 Turbo DTM	+1.620
17	39	(Japan) Yuichi Nakayama	SARD	Lexus LC500 GT500	+1.756
18	00	(Japan) Kamui Kobayashi	Team RBM	BMW M4 Turbo DTM	+1.840
19	11	(Germany) Marco Wittmann	Team RBM	BMW M4 Turbo DTM	+1.880
20	64	(Japan) Tadasuke Makino	Nakajima Racing	Honda NSX-GT	+2.109
21	16	(Japan) Hideki Mutoh	Mugen Motorsports	Honda NSX-GT	+2.810
22	4	(Italy) Alex Zanardi	Team RBM	BMW M4 Turbo DTM	+3.384

=== Race 1 ===
Pos.	No.	Driver	Team	Car	Laps	Time/Retired
1	37	(New Zealand) Nick Cassidy	TOM'S	Lexus LC500 GT500	34	57:45.326
2	17	(Japan) Koudai Tsukakoshi	REAL Racing	Honda NSX-GT	34	+0.433
3	1	(Japan) Naoki Yamamoto	Team Kunimitsu	Honda NSX-GT	34	+5.862
4	6	(Japan) Kenta Yamashita	Team LeMans	Lexus LC500 GT500	34	+6.974
5	19	(Japan) Sho Tsuboi	Racing Project Bandoh	Lexus LC500 GT500	34	+9.966
6	21	(France) Benoît Tréluyer	Team WRT	Audi RS5 Turbo DTM	34	+11.242
7	36	(Japan) Yuhi Sekiguchi	SARD	Lexus LC500 GT500	34	+11.369
8	33	(Germany) René Rast	Team Rosberg	Audi RS5 Turbo DTM	34	+11.540
9	38	(Japan) Yuji Tachikawa	Cerumo	Lexus LC500 GT500	34	+13.421
10	16	(Japan) Hideki Mutoh	Mugen Motorsports	Honda NSX-GT	34	+13.426
11	3	(France) Frédéric Makowiecki	B-Max Racing	Nissan GT-R Nismo GT500	34	+15.648
12	23	(Italy) Ronnie Quintarelli	Nismo	Nissan GT-R Nismo GT500	34	+15.764
13	99	(Germany) Mike Rockenfeller	Abt Sportsline	Audi RS5 Turbo DTM	34	+18.790
14	00	(Japan) Kamui Kobayashi	Team RBM	BMW M4 Turbo DTM	34	+18.929
15	8	(Japan) Takuya Izawa	ARTA	Honda NSX-GT	34	+19.832
16	39	(Japan) Yuichi Nakayama	SARD	Lexus LC500 GT500	34	+20.524
17	24	(United Kingdom) Jann Mardenborough	Kondo Racing	Nissan GT-R Nismo GT500	34	+22.480
18	11	(Germany) Marco Wittmann	Team RBM	BMW M4 Turbo DTM	33	+1 lap
19	12	(Japan) Daiki Sasaki	Team Impul	Nissan GT-R Nismo GT500	27	Mechanical
20	64	(Japan) Tadasuke Makino	Nakajima Racing	Honda NSX-GT	24	Mechanical
21	4	(Italy) Alex Zanardi	Team RBM	BMW M4 Turbo DTM	16	Engine
DNS	28	(France) Loïc Duval	Phoenix Racing	Audi RS5 Turbo DTM		Crash on sighting lap

=== Qualifying 2 ===
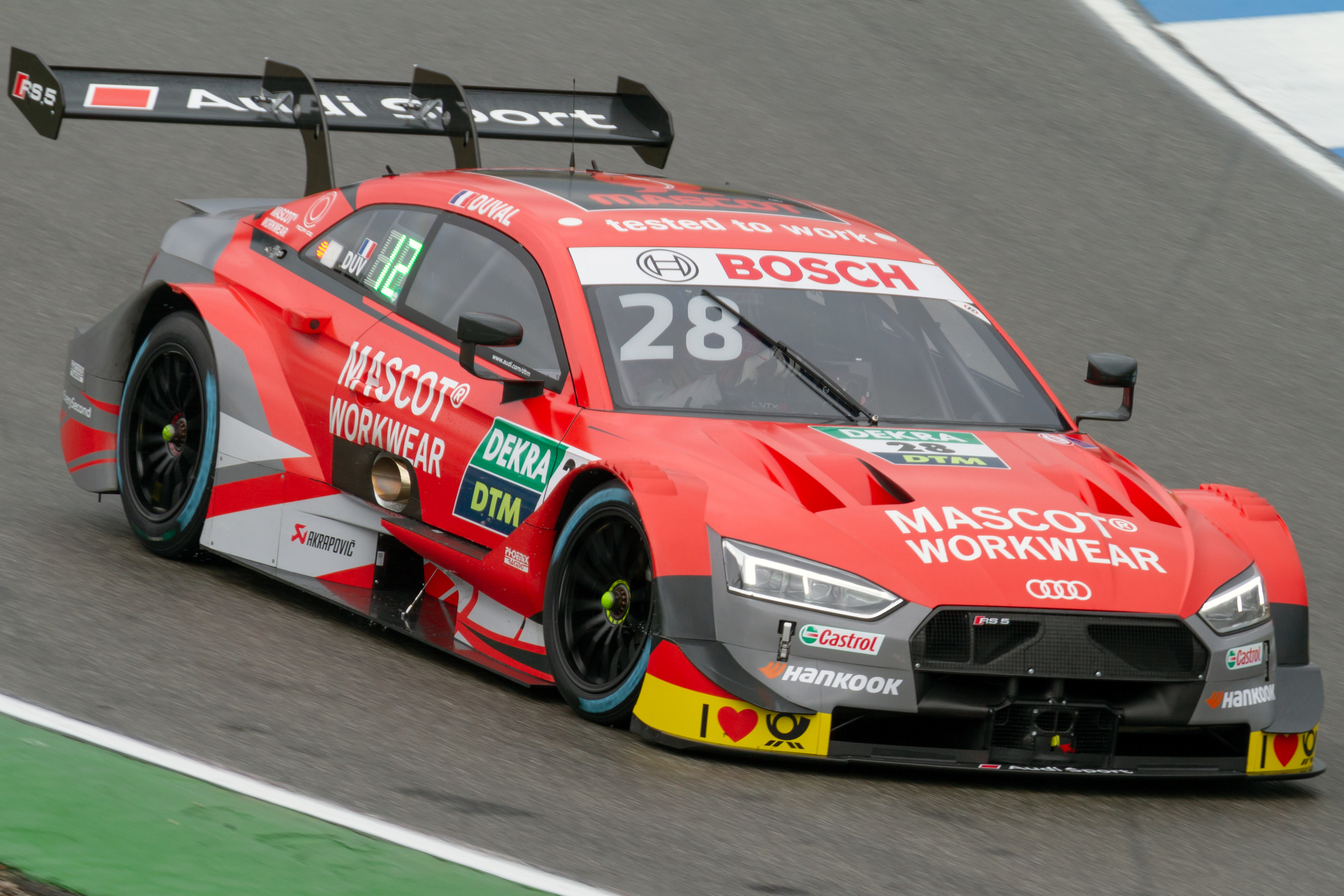
Loïc Duval was the fastest DTM runner in both qualifying sessions.

Pos.	No.	Driver	Team	Car	Time
1	16	(Japan) Daisuke Nakajima	Mugen Motorsports	Honda NSX-GT	1:46.696^{A}
2	28	(France) Loïc Duval	Phoenix Racing	Audi RS5 Turbo DTM	+0.244
3	64	(India) Narain Karthikeyan	Nakajima Racing	Honda NSX-GT	+0.338
4	1	(Japan) Naoki Yamamoto	Team Kunimitsu	Honda NSX-GT	+0.422
5	33	(Germany) René Rast	Team Rosberg	Audi RS5 Turbo DTM	+0.455
6	17	(Japan) Koudai Tsukakoshi	REAL Racing	Honda NSX-GT	+0.612
7	11	(Germany) Marco Wittmann	Team RBM	BMW M4 Turbo DTM	+0.631
8	99	(Germany) Mike Rockenfeller	Abt Sportsline	Audi RS5 Turbo DTM	+0.700
9	37	(Japan) Ryō Hirakawa	TOM'S	Lexus LC500 GT500	+0.788
10	38	(Japan) Hiroaki Ishiura	Cerumo	Lexus LC500 GT500	+1.068
11	36	(Japan) Kazuki Nakajima	SARD	Lexus LC500 GT500	+1.229
12	8	(Japan) Tomoki Nojiri	ARTA	Honda NSX-GT	+1.244
13	00	(Japan) Kamui Kobayashi	Team RBM	BMW M4 Turbo DTM	+1.312
14	19	(Japan) Yuji Kunimoto	Racing Project Bandoh	Lexus LC500 GT500	+1.355
15	21	(France) Benoît Tréluyer	Team WRT	Audi RS5 Turbo DTM	+1.406
16	39	(Finland) Heikki Kovalainen	SARD	Lexus LC500 GT500	+1.433
17	23	(Japan) Tsugio Matsuda	Nismo	Nissan GT-R Nismo GT500	+1.824
18	3	(Japan) Kohei Hirate	B-Max Racing	Nissan GT-R Nismo GT500	+2.093
19	12	(United Kingdom) James Rossiter	Team Impul	Nissan GT-R Nismo GT500	+2.370
20	6	(Japan) Kazuya Oshima	Team LeMans	Lexus LC500 GT500	+2.871
21	24	(Japan) Mitsunori Takaboshi	Kondo Racing	Nissan GT-R Nismo GT500	+3.251
22	4	(Italy) Alex Zanardi	Team RBM	BMW M4 Turbo DTM	+3.862

=== Race 2 ===
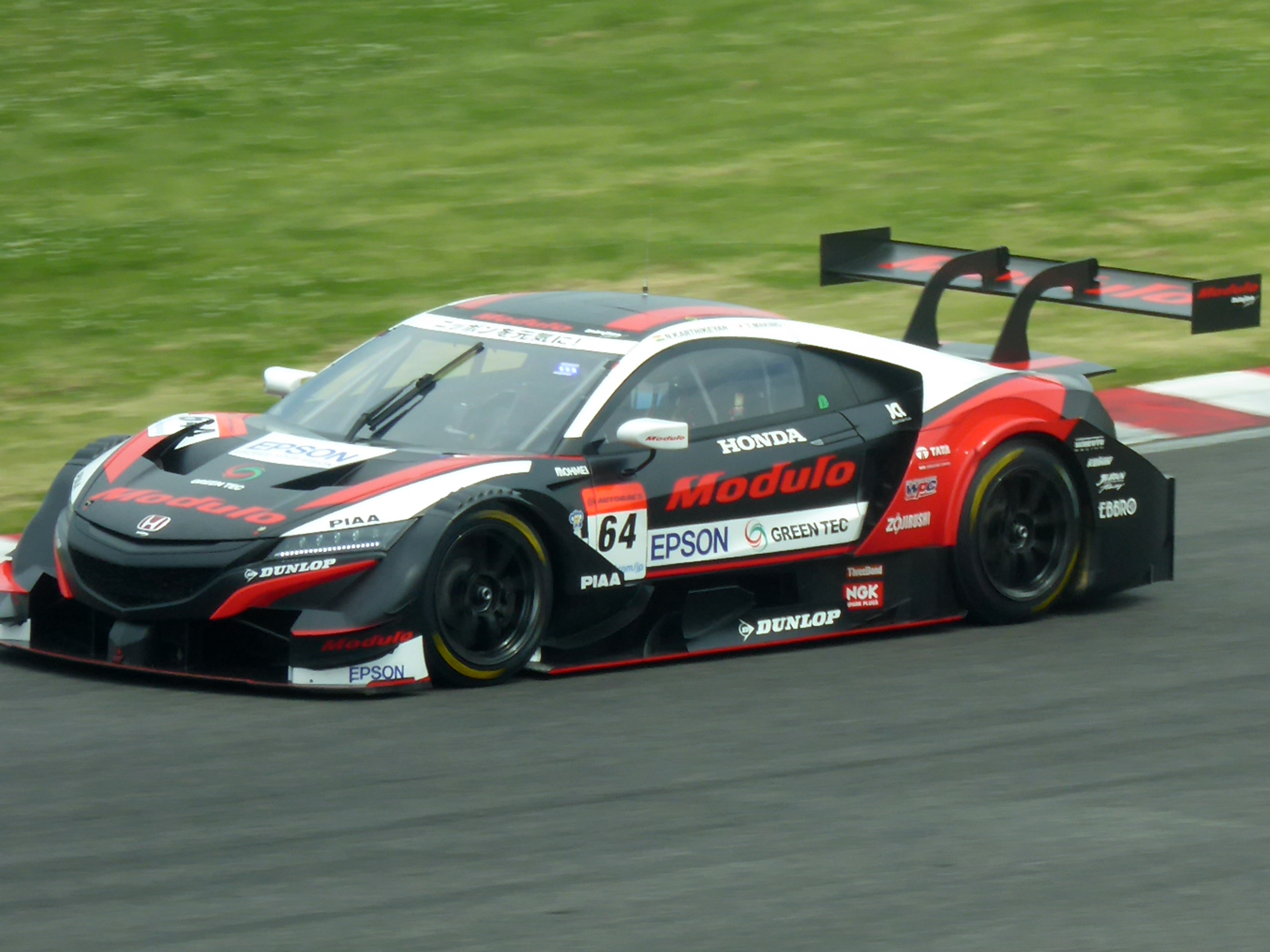
Narain Karthikeyan won Race 2.

Pos.	No.	Driver	Team	Car	Laps	Time/Retired
1	64	(India) Narain Karthikeyan	Nakajima Racing	Honda NSX-GT	31	57:38.362
2	11	(Germany) Marco Wittmann	Team RBM	BMW M4 Turbo DTM	31	+0.935
3	28	(France) Loïc Duval	Phoenix Racing	Audi RS5 Turbo DTM	31	+1.825
4	1	(Japan) Naoki Yamamoto	Team Kunimitsu	Honda NSX-GT	31	+3.412
5	00	(Japan) Kamui Kobayashi	Team RBM	BMW M4 Turbo DTM	31	+3.743
6	16	(Japan) Daisuke Nakajima	Mugen Motorsports	Honda NSX-GT	31	+4.356
7	99	(Germany) Mike Rockenfeller	Abt Sportsline	Audi RS5 Turbo DTM	31	+4.536
8	37	(Japan) Ryō Hirakawa	TOM'S	Lexus LC500 GT500	31	+4.681
9	33	(Germany) René Rast	Team Rosberg	Audi RS5 Turbo DTM	31	+5.624
10	21	(France) Benoît Tréluyer	Team WRT	Audi RS5 Turbo DTM	31	+7.226
11	23	(Japan) Tsugio Matsuda	Nismo	Nissan GT-R Nismo GT500	31	+7.542
12	24	(Japan) Mitsunori Takaboshi	Kondo Racing	Nissan GT-R Nismo GT500	31	+7.635
13	4	(Italy) Alex Zanardi	Team RBM	BMW M4 Turbo DTM	31	+7.680
14	39	(Finland) Heikki Kovalainen	SARD	Lexus LC500 GT500	31	+8.950
15	19	(Japan) Yuji Kunimoto	Racing Project Bandoh	Lexus LC500 GT500	31	+9.310
16	6	(Japan) Kazuya Oshima	Team LeMans	Lexus LC500 GT500	31	+9.311
17	12	(United Kingdom) James Rossiter	Team Impul	Nissan GT-R Nismo GT500	26	Crash damage
18	3	(Japan) Kohei Hirate	B-Max Racing	Nissan GT-R Nismo GT500	26	Crash damage
19	36	(Japan) Kazuki Nakajima	SARD	Lexus LC500 GT500	26	Crash damage
20	38	(Japan) Hiroaki Ishiura	Cerumo	Lexus LC500 GT500	26	Crash damage
21	17	(Japan) Koudai Tsukakoshi	REAL Racing	Honda NSX-GT	25	Crash damage
22	8	(Japan) Tomoki Nojiri	ARTA	Honda NSX-GT	25	Crash damage

== Notes ==
Daisuke Nakajima set the fastest time in Qualifying 2, but received a five-place grid penalty for Race 2 for changing chassis – Loïc Duval was promoted to pole position.

Previous race: 2019 DTM Hockenheim Final	Deutsche Tourenwagen Masters; 2019 season	Next race: 2020 DTM Spa-Francorchamps round
Previous race: 2019 Motegi GT 250km Race	Super GT; 2019 season	Next race: 2020 Fuji GT 300km Race
