= 2019 Zolder DTM round =

(Belgium) 2019 DTM Zolder round
Event Information
- Round 2 of 9 in the 2019 Deutsche Tourenwagen Masters
- Date: 18–19 May 2019 Deutsche Tourenwagen Masters
- Location: Heusden-Zolder, Belgium
- Venue: Circuit Zolder
- Weather: Saturday: Sunny; Sunday: Sunny

Results
Race 1
Distance	39 laps	156.390 km
Pole position	(Germany) Marco Wittmann; BMW Team RMG	1:21.307
Winner	(Austria) Philipp Eng; BMW Team RMR	59:34.758
Race 2
Distance	39 laps	156.390 km
Pole position	(South Africa) Sheldon van der Linde; BMW Team RBM	1:21.590
Winner	(Germany) René Rast; Audi Sport Team Rosberg	59:24.539

The 2019 DTM Zolder round is a motor racing event for the Deutsche Tourenwagen Masters held between 18 and 19 May 2019. The event, part of the 33rd season of the DTM, was held at the Circuit Zolder in Belgium.

== Results ==
=== Race 1 ===
==== Qualifying ====
Pos.	No.	Driver	Team	Car	Time	Gap	Grid	Pts
1	11	(Germany) Marco Wittmann	BMW Team RMG	BMW M4 Turbo DTM	1:21.307		1	3
2	33	(Germany) René Rast	Audi Sport Team Rosberg	Audi RS5 Turbo DTM	1:21.349	+0.042	2	2
3	7	(Canada) Bruno Spengler	BMW Team RMG	BMW M4 Turbo DTM	1:21.614	+0.307	3	1
4	31	(South Africa) Sheldon van der Linde	BMW Team RBM	BMW M4 Turbo DTM	1:21.744	+0.437	4	
5	4	(Netherlands) Robin Frijns	Audi Sport Team Abt	Audi RS5 Turbo DTM	1:21.911	+0.604	5	
6	16	(Germany) Timo Glock	BMW Team RMR	BMW M4 Turbo DTM	1:21.940	+0.633	6	
7	25	(Austria) Philipp Eng	BMW Team RMR	BMW M4 Turbo DTM	1:21.995	+0.688	7	
8	51	(Switzerland) Nico Müller	Audi Sport Team Abt	Audi RS5 Turbo DTM	1:22.079	+0.772	8	
9	47	(Sweden) Joel Eriksson	BMW Team RBM	BMW M4 Turbo DTM	1:22.082	+0.775	9	
10	53	(United Kingdom) Jamie Green	Audi Sport Team Rosberg	Audi RS5 Turbo DTM	1:22.143	+0.836	10	
11	21	(Brazil) Pietro Fittipaldi	Audi Sport Team WRT	Audi RS5 Turbo DTM	1:22.154	+0.847	11	
12	27	(South Africa) Jonathan Aberdein	Audi Sport Team WRT	Audi RS5 Turbo DTM	1:22.188	+0.881	12	
13	76	(United Kingdom) Jake Dennis	R-Motorsport	Aston Martin Vantage DTM	1:22.215	+0.908	13	
14	28	(France) Loïc Duval	Audi Sport Team Phoenix	Audi RS5 Turbo DTM	1:22.519	+1.212	14	
15	23	(Spain) Daniel Juncadella	R-Motorsport	Aston Martin Vantage DTM	1:22.675	+1.368	15	
16	99	(Germany) Mike Rockenfeller	Audi Sport Team Phoenix	Audi RS5 Turbo DTM	1:22.684	+1.377	18^{1}	
17	3	(United Kingdom) Paul di Resta	R-Motorsport	Aston Martin Vantage DTM	1:22.694	+1.387	16	
18	62	(Austria) Ferdinand von Habsburg	R-Motorsport	Aston Martin Vantage DTM	1:23.240	+1.933	17	

^1 – Car #99 sent to the rear of field having made illegal modifications under Parc Fermé conditions.

==== Race ====
Pos	No.	Driver	Team	Car	Laps	Time / Retired	Grid	Pts
1	25	(Austria) Philipp Eng	BMW Team RMR	BMW M4 Turbo DTM	39	59:34.758	7	25
2	47	(Sweden) Joel Eriksson	BMW Team RBM	BMW M4 Turbo DTM	39	+8.645	9	18
3	51	(Switzerland) Nico Müller	Audi Sport Team Abt	Audi RS5 Turbo DTM	39	+8.829	8	15
4	28	(France) Loïc Duval	Audi Sport Team Phoenix	Audi RS5 Turbo DTM	39	+18.159	14	12
5	99	(Germany) Mike Rockenfeller	Audi Sport Team Phoenix	Audi RS5 Turbo DTM	39	+24.502	18	10
6	53	(United Kingdom) Jamie Green	Audi Sport Team Rosberg	Audi RS5 Turbo DTM	39	+32.318	10	8
7	11	(Germany) Marco Wittmann	BMW Team RMG	BMW M4 Turbo DTM	39	+32.746	1	6
8	3	(United Kingdom) Paul di Resta	R-Motorsport	Aston Martin Vantage DTM	39	+35.875	16	4
9	62	(Austria) Ferdinand von Habsburg	R-Motorsport	Aston Martin Vantage DTM	39	+38.858	17	2
10	7	(Canada) Bruno Spengler	BMW Team RMG	BMW M4 Turbo DTM	39	+39.874	3	1
11	31	(South Africa) Sheldon van der Linde	BMW Team RBM	BMW M4 Turbo DTM	39	+40.571	4	
12	4	(Netherlands) Robin Frijns	Audi Sport Team Abt	Audi RS5 Turbo DTM	39	+42.721	5	
13	16	(Germany) Timo Glock	BMW Team RMR	BMW M4 Turbo DTM	39	+45.672	6	
14	21	(Brazil) Pietro Fittipaldi	Audi Sport Team WRT	Audi RS5 Turbo DTM	39	+1:09.779	11	
NC	27	(South Africa) Jonathan Aberdein	Audi Sport Team WRT	Audi RS5 Turbo DTM	27	+12 Laps^{1}	12	
NC	33	(Germany) René Rast	Audi Sport Team Rosberg	Audi RS5 Turbo DTM	27	+12 Laps^{1}	2	
Ret	23	(Spain) Daniel Juncadella	R-Motorsport	Aston Martin Vantage DTM	12	Mechanical	15	
Ret	76	(United Kingdom) Jake Dennis	R-Motorsport	Aston Martin Vantage DTM	12	Mechanical	13	
Fastest lap set by Robin Frijns: 1:23.751

^1 – Drivers did not complete 75% of the race distance, and therefore are not classified as finishers in the official results.

=== Race 2 ===
==== Qualifying ====
Pos.	No.	Driver	Team	Car	Time	Gap	Grid	Pts
1	31	(South Africa) Sheldon van der Linde	BMW Team RBM	BMW M4 Turbo DTM	1:21.590		1	3
2	33	(Germany) René Rast	Audi Sport Team Rosberg	Audi RS5 Turbo DTM	1:21.596	+0.006	2	2
3	25	(Austria) Philipp Eng	BMW Team RMR	BMW M4 Turbo DTM	1:21.714	+0.124	3	1
4	4	(Netherlands) Robin Frijns	Audi Sport Team Abt	Audi RS5 Turbo DTM	1:21.733	+0.143	4	
5	16	(Germany) Timo Glock	BMW Team RMR	BMW M4 Turbo DTM	1:21.803	+0.213	5	
6	99	(Germany) Mike Rockenfeller	Audi Sport Team Phoenix	Audi RS5 Turbo DTM	1:22.133	+0.543	6	
7	11	(Germany) Marco Wittmann	BMW Team RMG	BMW M4 Turbo DTM	1:22.142	+0.552	7	
8	27	(South Africa) Jonathan Aberdein	Audi Sport Team WRT	Audi RS5 Turbo DTM	1:22.246	+0.656	8	
9	53	(United Kingdom) Jamie Green	Audi Sport Team Rosberg	Audi RS5 Turbo DTM	1:22.255	+0.665	9	
10	47	(Sweden) Joel Eriksson	BMW Team RBM	BMW M4 Turbo DTM	1:22.291	+0.701	10	
11	28	(France) Loïc Duval	Audi Sport Team Phoenix	Audi RS5 Turbo DTM	1:22.426	+0.836	11	
12	51	(Switzerland) Nico Müller	Audi Sport Team Abt	Audi RS5 Turbo DTM	1:22.433	+0.843	12	
13	76	(United Kingdom) Jake Dennis	R-Motorsport	Aston Martin Vantage DTM	1:22.563	+0.973	13	
14	21	(Brazil) Pietro Fittipaldi	Audi Sport Team WRT	Audi RS5 Turbo DTM	1:22.582	+0.992	14	
15	7	(Canada) Bruno Spengler	BMW Team RMG	BMW M4 Turbo DTM	1:22.613	+1.023	15	
16	23	(Spain) Daniel Juncadella	R-Motorsport	Aston Martin Vantage DTM	1:23.103	+1.513	16	
17	62	(Austria) Ferdinand von Habsburg	R-Motorsport	Aston Martin Vantage DTM	1:23.703	+2.113	17	
18	3	(United Kingdom) Paul di Resta	R-Motorsport	Aston Martin Vantage DTM	1:24.088	+2.498	18	

==== Race ====
Pos	No.	Driver	Team	Car	Laps	Time / Retired	Grid	Pts
1	33	(Germany) René Rast	Audi Sport Team Rosberg	Audi RS5 Turbo DTM	39	59:24.539	2	25
2	25	(Austria) Philipp Eng	BMW Team RMR	BMW M4 Turbo DTM	39	+9.845	3	18
3	53	(United Kingdom) Jamie Green	Audi Sport Team Rosberg	Audi RS5 Turbo DTM	39	+11.791	9	15
4	99	(Germany) Mike Rockenfeller	Audi Sport Team Phoenix	Audi RS5 Turbo DTM	39	+12.601	6	12
5	31	(South Africa) Sheldon van der Linde	BMW Team RBM	BMW M4 Turbo DTM	39	+13.195	1	10
6	76	(United Kingdom) Jake Dennis	R-Motorsport	Aston Martin Vantage DTM	39	+19.825	13	8
7	7	(Canada) Bruno Spengler	BMW Team RMG	BMW M4 Turbo DTM	39	+20.468	15	6
8	51	(Switzerland) Nico Müller	Audi Sport Team Abt	Audi RS5 Turbo DTM	39	+21.563	12	4
9	21	(Brazil) Pietro Fittipaldi	Audi Sport Team WRT	Audi RS5 Turbo DTM	39	+22.661	14	2
10	47	(Sweden) Joel Eriksson	BMW Team RBM	BMW M4 Turbo DTM	39	+23.550	10	1
11	28	(France) Loïc Duval	Audi Sport Team Phoenix	Audi RS5 Turbo DTM	39	+23.648	11	
12	27	(South Africa) Jonathan Aberdein	Audi Sport Team WRT	Audi RS5 Turbo DTM	39	+26.793	8	
13	11	(Germany) Marco Wittmann	BMW Team RMG	BMW M4 Turbo DTM	39	+39.780	7	
14	16	(Germany) Timo Glock	BMW Team RMR	BMW M4 Turbo DTM	38	+1 Lap	5	
Ret	23	(Spain) Daniel Juncadella	R-Motorsport	Aston Martin Vantage DTM	27	Crash damage	16	
Ret	4	(Netherlands) Robin Frijns	Audi Sport Team Abt	Audi RS5 Turbo DTM	21	Crash	4	
Ret	62	(Austria) Ferdinand von Habsburg	R-Motorsport	Aston Martin Vantage DTM	17	Mechanical	17	
DNS	3	(United Kingdom) Paul di Resta	R-Motorsport	Aston Martin Vantage DTM	0		18	
Fastest lap set by Philipp Eng: 1:23.600

== Championship standings ==
Drivers Championship

	Pos	Driver	Pts	Gap
7	1	(Austria) Philipp Eng	59	
1	2	(Germany) René Rast	54	-5
2	3	(Germany) Marco Wittmann	43	-16
1	4	(Germany) Mike Rockenfeller	42	-17
1	5	(Switzerland) Nico Müller	41	-18

Teams Championship

	Pos	Team	Pts	Gap
4	1	(Germany) Audi Sport Team Rosberg (33, 53)	79	
1	1	(Belgium) BMW Team RMR (16, 25)	79	
2	3	(Germany) Audi Sport Team Abt (4, 51)	72	-7
2	4	(Germany) BMW Team RMG (7, 11)	67	-12
1	5	(Germany) Audi Sport Team Phoenix (28, 99)	64	-15

Manufacturers Championship

Pos	Drivers	Pts	Gap
1	(Germany) Audi	213	
2	(Germany) BMW	186	-27
3	(United Kingdom) Aston Martin	23	-190

- Note: Only the top five positions are included for three sets of standings.

== See also ==
- 2019 W Series Zolder round

Previous race: 2019 1st Hockenheim DTM round	Deutsche Tourenwagen Masters; 2019 season	Next race: 2019 Misano DTM round
