= 2020 Deutsche Tourenwagen Masters =

2020 edition of Deutsche Tourenwagen Masters

Champions
- Drivers' Champion: René Rast
- Teams' Champion: Abt Sportsline
- Manufacturers' Championship: Audi

Seasons
- ← 2019 2021 →

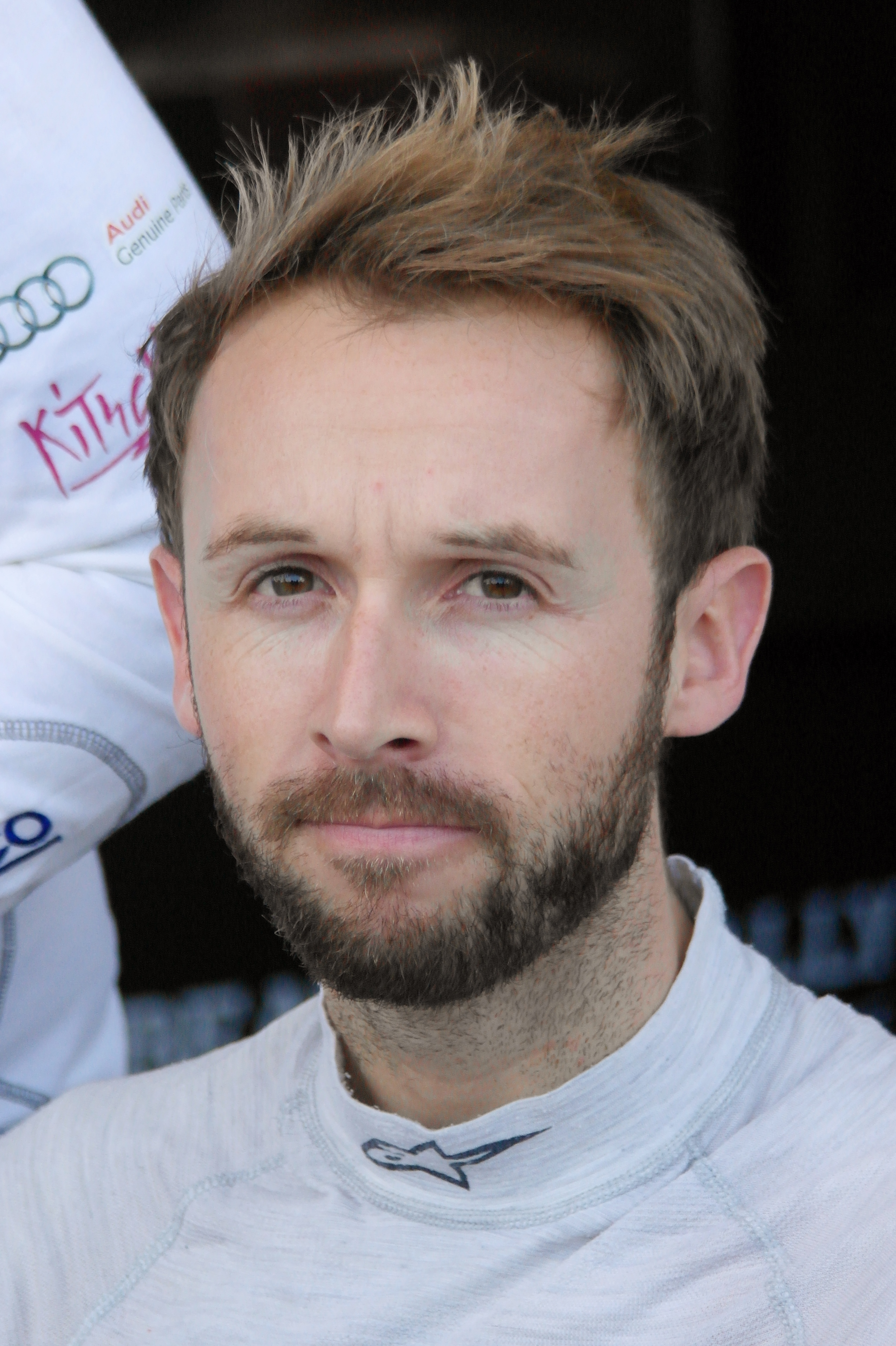
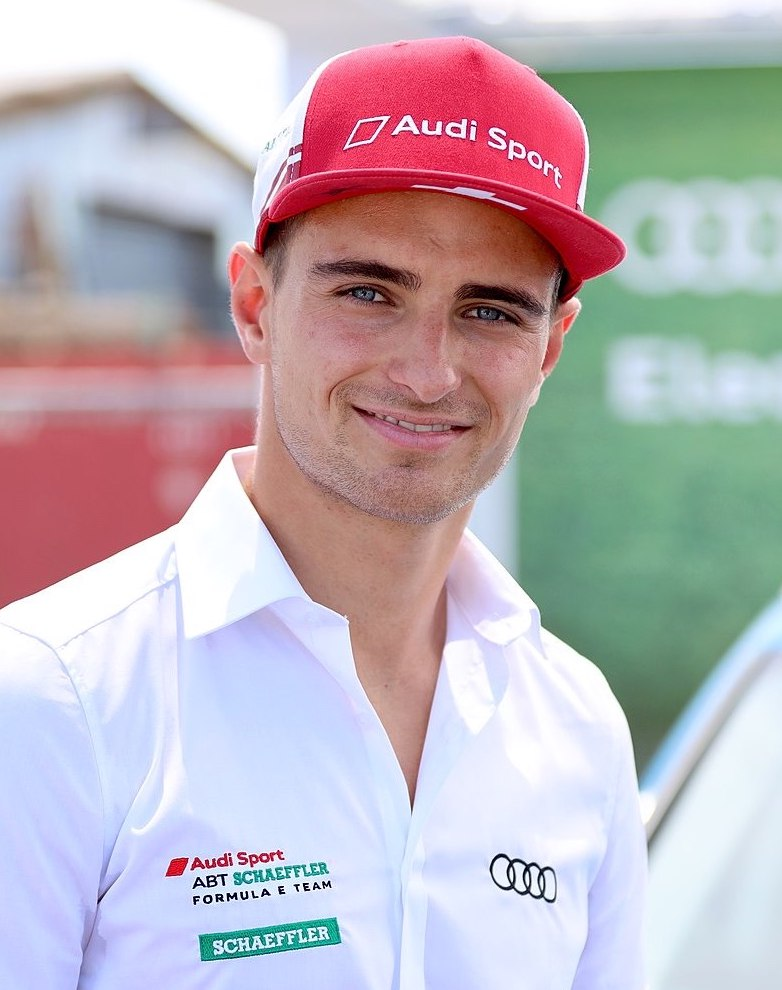
René Rast (left) won his third Drivers' Championship while Nico Müller (right) finished second in the championship.

The 2020 Deutsche Tourenwagen Masters was the thirty-fourth season of premier German touring car championship and also twenty-first season under the moniker of Deutsche Tourenwagen Masters since the series' resumption in 2000 as well as second and final season of "Class 1" regulations era.

Audi entered as the defending Manufacturers' Champion, after winning their seventh title in 2019, Audi Sport Team Rosberg entered as the defending teams' champion and René Rast entered as the defending drivers' champion, after winning his second title in 2019.

After Aston Martin and R-Motorsport decided to withdraw from Deutsche Tourenwagen Masters, the 2020 season marks the first season since 2011 that the series featured only two manufacturers.

2020 also marked the final season for Audi Sport in the DTM, shifting their focus to FIA Formula E and customer programmes. It also marked the final season for the "Class 1" regulations, as the DTM switched to GT Pro regulations for 2021.

René Rast retained the DTM driver's title for the second year in a row (third overall).

== Teams and drivers ==
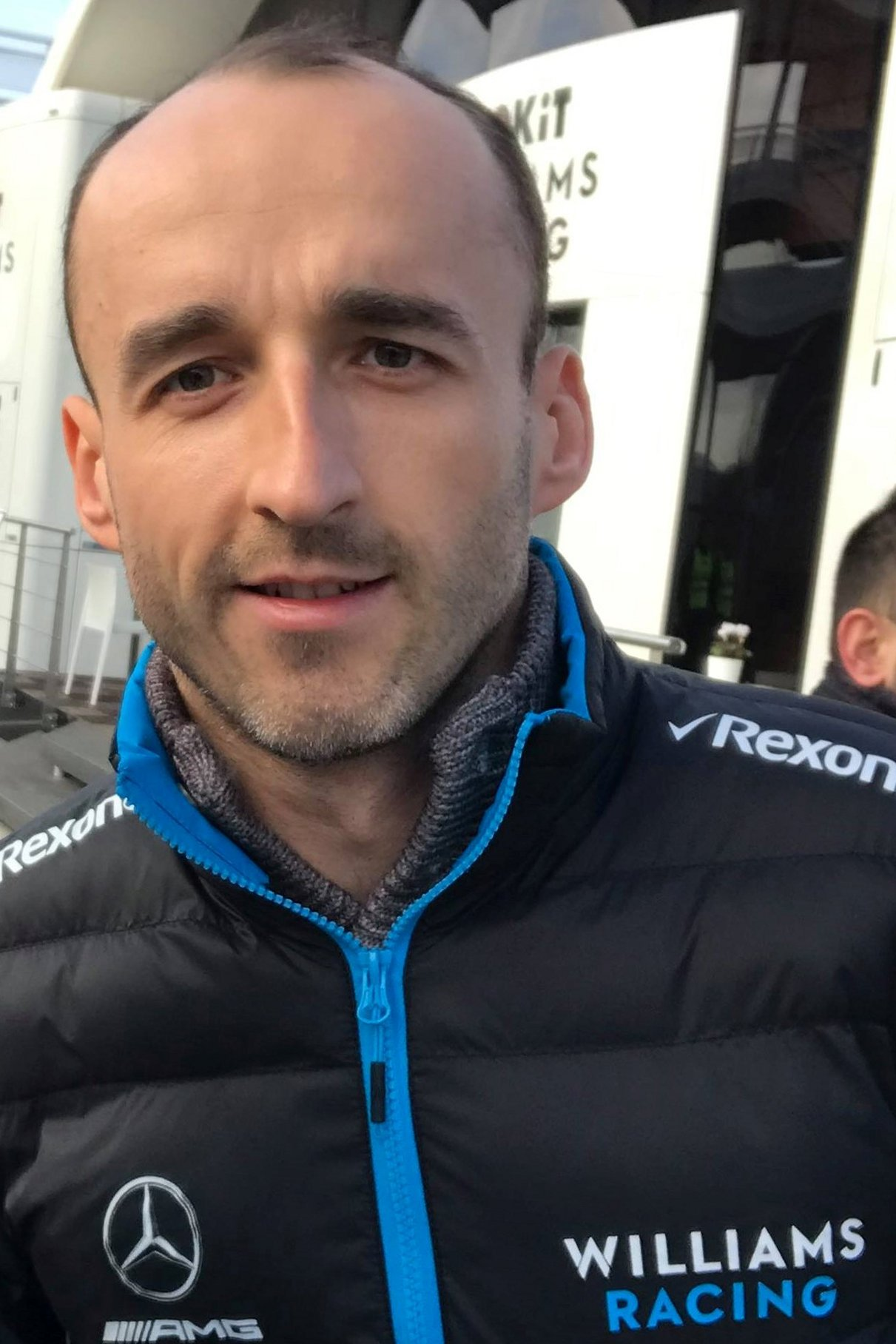
Robert Kubica (pictured), Harrison Newey and Fabio Scherer all made their DTM débuts in 2020.

The following manufacturers, teams and drivers competed in the 2020 Deutsche Tourenwagen Masters. All teams competed with tyres supplied by Hankook.

Manufacturer	Car	Engine	Team	No.	Driver name	Rounds
Audi	Audi RS5 Turbo DTM 2020	Audi RC8 2.0 TFSI I-4t	(Germany) Audi Sport Team Abt Sportsline	4	(Netherlands) Robin Frijns	All
Audi	Audi RS5 Turbo DTM 2020	Audi RC8 2.0 TFSI I-4t	(Germany) Audi Sport Team Abt Sportsline	51	(Switzerland) Nico Müller	All
Audi	Audi RS5 Turbo DTM 2020	Audi RC8 2.0 TFSI I-4t	(Belgium) Audi Sport Team WRT	10	(United Kingdom) Harrison Newey	All
Audi	Audi RS5 Turbo DTM 2020	Audi RC8 2.0 TFSI I-4t	(Belgium) Audi Sport Team WRT	13	(Switzerland) Fabio Scherer	All
Audi	Audi RS5 Turbo DTM 2020	Audi RC8 2.0 TFSI I-4t	(Belgium) Audi Sport Team WRT	62	(Austria) Ferdinand von Habsburg	All
Audi	Audi RS5 Turbo DTM 2020	Audi RC8 2.0 TFSI I-4t	(Germany) Audi Sport Team Phoenix	19	(France) Benoît Tréluyer	8
Audi	Audi RS5 Turbo DTM 2020	Audi RC8 2.0 TFSI I-4t	(Germany) Audi Sport Team Phoenix	28	(France) Loïc Duval	1–7, 9
Audi	Audi RS5 Turbo DTM 2020	Audi RC8 2.0 TFSI I-4t	(Germany) Audi Sport Team Phoenix	99	(Germany) Mike Rockenfeller	All
Audi	Audi RS5 Turbo DTM 2020	Audi RC8 2.0 TFSI I-4t	(Germany) Audi Sport Team Rosberg	33	(Germany) René Rast	All
Audi	Audi RS5 Turbo DTM 2020	Audi RC8 2.0 TFSI I-4t	(Germany) Audi Sport Team Rosberg	53	(United Kingdom) Jamie Green	All
BMW	BMW M4 Turbo DTM 2020	BMW P48 Turbo I-4t	(France) Orlen Team ART	8	(Poland) Robert Kubica	All
BMW	BMW M4 Turbo DTM 2020	BMW P48 Turbo I-4t	(Germany) BMW Team RMG	11	(Germany) Marco Wittmann	All
BMW	BMW M4 Turbo DTM 2020	BMW P48 Turbo I-4t	(Germany) BMW Team RMG	16	(Germany) Timo Glock	All
BMW	BMW M4 Turbo DTM 2020	BMW P48 Turbo I-4t	(Belgium) BMW Team RMR	22	(Austria) Lucas Auer	All
BMW	BMW M4 Turbo DTM 2020	BMW P48 Turbo I-4t	(Belgium) BMW Team RMR	27	(South Africa) Jonathan Aberdein	All
BMW	BMW M4 Turbo DTM 2020	BMW P48 Turbo I-4t	(Belgium) BMW Team RBM	25	(Austria) Philipp Eng	All
BMW	BMW M4 Turbo DTM 2020	BMW P48 Turbo I-4t	(Belgium) BMW Team RBM	31	(South Africa) Sheldon van der Linde	All

=== Team changes ===
- BMW was due to introduce customer teams for the 2020 season, increasing their line-up size to seven cars. This led to the return of ART Grand Prix, which last competed in 2016.
- Aston Martin terminated their contract with engine partner HWA after the 2019 season. Aston Martin ultimately withdrew from the series in January 2020.

=== Driver changes ===
- 2019 Audi Sport Team WRT drivers Jonathan Aberdein and Pietro Fittipaldi were dropped after one season with the team. They were replaced by another all-rookie lineup consisting of 2016 Indy Lights champion Ed Jones, who left the IndyCar Series after 3 seasons, and FIA Formula 3 Championship driver Fabio Scherer. Jones later pulled out of the championship due to complications in travel owing to the COVID-19 pandemic in the United Arab Emirates, paving the way for Harrison Newey to make his début instead. Aberdein moved across to BMW replacing Bruno Spengler, who left the series after fifteen years to join BMW Team RLL in the WeatherTech SportsCar Championship. Fittipaldi planned to return to the Super Formula Championship, but later joined Haas F1 Team as their test and reserve driver. All factory Audi DTM drivers returned for the third season running.
- Former Mercedes driver Lucas Auer returned to the series with BMW after a one-year hiatus; he replaced Joel Eriksson, who left the series after two seasons to drive in the ADAC GT Masters.
- Ferdinand von Habsburg moved to Audi Sport Team WRT after Aston Martin failed to return for 2020. His 2019 team-mates Daniel Juncadella, Paul di Resta and Jake Dennis were left without drives after the British marque's departure from the series.
- Former Formula One driver Robert Kubica made his DTM debut with Orlen Team ART.

=== Mid-season changes ===
- With Loïc Duval forced to miss the second Zolder round due to a clashing commitment at Petit Le Mans, Benoît Tréluyer deputised for him.

== Calendar ==
A provisional ten-round calendar was announced on 19 September 2019: five rounds will be held in Germany, and four outside of Germany. However, the calendar was altered twice in response to the COVID-19 pandemic; initially on 26 March before a further modified schedule was published on 3 June.

Round	Circuit	Race 1	Race 2
1	(Belgium) Circuit de Spa-Francorchamps	1 August	2 August
2	(Germany) Lausitzring (Sprint Circuit)	15 August	16 August
3	(Germany) Lausitzring (Grand Prix Circuit)	22 August	23 August
4	(Netherlands) TT Circuit Assen	5 September	6 September
5	(Germany) Nürburgring (Grand Prix Circuit)	12 September	13 September
6	(Germany) Nürburgring (Sprint Circuit)	19 September	20 September
7	(Belgium) Circuit Zolder	10 October	11 October
8	(Belgium) Circuit Zolder	17 October	18 October
9	(Germany) Hockenheimring	7 November	8 November
Cancelled due to the COVID-19 pandemic
	Circuit	Original Dates	
	(Russia) Igora Drive, Priozersk	30 May	31 May
	(Sweden) Anderstorp Raceway, Anderstorp	13 June	14 June
	(Italy) Autodromo Nazionale Monza, Monza	27 June	28 June
	(Germany) Norisring, Nuremberg	11 July	12 July
	(United Kingdom) Brands Hatch, Kent	22 August	23 August

=== Calendar changes ===
Original calendar

- The Misano World Circuit Marco Simoncelli was removed from the calendar, owing to declining attendance numbers. It will be replaced by the Autodromo Nazionale Monza which will make its series début. Also making its début on the calendar will be a Swedish round at Anderstorp Raceway.
- The Hockenheimring will feature just one round instead of the usual two rounds, with Circuit Zolder becoming the new season-opener.
- Russia will return to DTM for the first time since 2017, with the series inaugurating the Igora Drive circuit near Saint Petersburg.

First amendments

- The first half of the season was postponed, with the opening race scheduled for the Norisring on its original date in July. Two event slots were left in early August and October respectively for either the Russian or Swedish round, with original season opener Zolder moved to August. The rounds at Brands Hatch, TT Circuit Assen and the Nürburgring were left on their original dates, with events at the Lausitzring, Hockenheimring and Monza moved to October and November.

Second amendments

- The Norisring Trophy remained the opening round on a schedule restricted to Germany and Benelux. The first blank slot was filled with the series' first event at the Circuit de Spa-Francorchamps since 2005, and will be followed by two events on back-to-back weekends at the Lausitzring. Further double-header events will be held at the Nürburgring and Zolder, with the Lausitz and Nürburg events punctuated by a round at Assen. The Hockenheimring returned to the season finale slot having been shuffled out by Monza in the first amendment. The Nuremberg season-opener was eventually cancelled after the local council ruled against holding the event behind closed doors on economic and health grounds.

== Regulation changes ==
- After a successful 2019 season, the push-to-pass overtake system was doubled from 30 to 60 horsepower (22 to 45 kilowatts) and the drag reduction system (DRS) usage became unrestricted. To compensate, the engine's power output was reduced from 610 to 580 horsepower (455 to 433 kilowatts).
- On 1 July 2019 it was announced that Hankook would once again extend their DTM tyre partner contract until at least 2023, beating out bids by Continental, Dunlop, Michelin, Pirelli and Yokohama to provide tyres for the series.
- A High Yaw Lift-Off (HYLO) system was introduced in front of the two rear wing pillars, to avoid cars becoming airborne in the event of a high-speed collision.
- The fuel-mass flow restrictor rate for all Deutsche Tourenwagen Masters engines was slightly reduced from 95 to 90 kg/h (209 to 198 lb/h) to compensate more fuel-efficiency and maximum performance with fuel-mass flow restrictor for extra push-to-pass mode slightly increased from 5 to 10 kg/h (11 to 22 lb/h).

== Results and standings ==
=== Season summary ===
Round		Circuit	Pole position	Fastest lap	Winning driver	Winning team	Winning manufacturer
1	R1	(Belgium) Spa-Francorchamps	(Netherlands) Robin Frijns	(Switzerland) Nico Müller	(Switzerland) Nico Müller	(Germany) Audi Sport Team Abt Sportsline	Audi
1	R2	(Belgium) Spa-Francorchamps	(Germany) René Rast	(Germany) René Rast	(Switzerland) Nico Müller	(Germany) Audi Sport Team Abt Sportsline	Audi
2	R1	(Germany) EuroSpeedway Lausitz Short	(Netherlands) Robin Frijns	(Switzerland) Nico Müller	(Switzerland) Nico Müller	(Germany) Audi Sport Team Abt Sportsline	Audi
2	R2	(Germany) EuroSpeedway Lausitz Short	(Netherlands) Robin Frijns	(Netherlands) Robin Frijns	(Germany) René Rast	(Germany) Audi Sport Team Rosberg	Audi
3	R1	(Germany) EuroSpeedway Lausitz Long	(Switzerland) Nico Müller	(Switzerland) Nico Müller	(Germany) René Rast	(Germany) Audi Sport Team Rosberg	Audi
3	R2	(Germany) EuroSpeedway Lausitz Long	(Netherlands) Robin Frijns	(United Kingdom) Jamie Green	(Austria) Lucas Auer	(Belgium) BMW Team RMR	BMW
4	R1	(Netherlands) TT Circuit Assen	(France) Loïc Duval	(Switzerland) Fabio Scherer	(Netherlands) Robin Frijns	(Germany) Audi Sport Team Abt Sportsline	Audi
4	R2	(Netherlands) TT Circuit Assen	(Germany) René Rast	(South Africa) Sheldon van der Linde	(South Africa) Sheldon van der Linde	(Belgium) BMW Team RBM	BMW
5	R1	(Germany) Nürburgring Grand Prix	(Switzerland) Nico Müller	(Switzerland) Nico Müller	(Switzerland) Nico Müller	(Germany) Audi Sport Team Abt Sportsline	Audi
5	R2	(Germany) Nürburgring Grand Prix	(Switzerland) Nico Müller	(Netherlands) Robin Frijns	(Netherlands) Robin Frijns	(Germany) Audi Sport Team Abt Sportsline	Audi
6	R1	(Germany) Nürburgring Sprint	(Germany) René Rast	(Switzerland) Nico Müller	(Netherlands) Robin Frijns	(Germany) Audi Sport Team Abt Sportsline	Audi
6	R2	(Germany) Nürburgring Sprint	(Netherlands) Robin Frijns	(Germany) René Rast	(Switzerland) Nico Müller	(Germany) Audi Sport Team Abt Sportsline	Audi
7	R1	(Belgium) Circuit Zolder I	(Germany) René Rast	(Germany) René Rast	(Germany) René Rast	(Germany) Audi Sport Team Rosberg	Audi
7	R2	(Belgium) Circuit Zolder I	(Germany) Timo Glock	(Germany) Marco Wittmann	(Germany) René Rast	(Germany) Audi Sport Team Rosberg	Audi
8	R1	(Belgium) Circuit Zolder II	(Germany) René Rast	(Germany) René Rast	(Germany) René Rast	(Germany) Audi Sport Team Rosberg	Audi
8	R2	(Belgium) Circuit Zolder II	(Austria) Ferdinand Habsburg	(Germany) René Rast	(Germany) René Rast	(Germany) Audi Sport Team Rosberg	Audi
9	R1	(Germany) Hockenheimring	(Germany) René Rast	(Germany) René Rast	(Switzerland) Nico Müller	(Germany) Audi Sport Team Abt Sportsline	Audi
9	R2	(Germany) Hockenheimring	(Germany) René Rast	(Germany) René Rast	(Germany) René Rast	(Germany) Audi Sport Team Rosberg	Audi

=== Scoring system ===
Points were awarded to the top ten classified finishers as follows:

Race Position	**1st**	**2nd**	**3rd**	**4th**	**5th**	**6th**	**7th**	**8th**	**9th**	**10th**
Points	25	18	15	12	10	8	6	4	2	1

Additionally, the top three placed drivers in qualifying also received points:

Qualifying Position	**1st**	**2nd**	**3rd**
Points	3	2	1

=== Drivers' championship ===
Pos.	Driver	SPA (Belgium)		LAU1 (Germany)		LAU2 (Germany)		ASN (Netherlands)		NÜR1 (Germany)		NÜR2 (Germany)		ZOL1 (Belgium)		ZOL2 (Belgium)		HOC (Germany)		Points
1	(Germany) René Rast	5^{3}	**3**^{1}	7	1^{3}	1^{2}	6^{3}	5	**5**^{1}	2^{2}	2^{3}	**2**^{1}	3	**1**^{1}	1^{3}	**1**^{1}	1^{2}	**2**^{1}	**1**^{1}	353
2	(Switzerland) Nico Müller	1^{2}	1^{3}	1^{2}	2^{2}	**2**^{1}	5^{2}	3^{3}	3	**1**^{1}	**5**^{1}	5^{3}	1^{3}	3	9	6	2	1^{2}	2	330
3	(Netherlands) Robin Frijns	**9**^{1}	2^{2}	**3**^{1}	**4**^{1}	3^{3}	**3**^{1}	1^{2}	2^{3}	5^{3}	1^{2}	1^{2}	**2**^{1}	2^{3}	Ret	2^{3}	Ret^{3}	7	5	279
4	(Germany) Mike Rockenfeller	4	5	11	5	6	11	4	11	4	3	9	7	8	2	Ret	6	6	4^{2}	139
5	(Germany) Timo Glock	8	13	5	6	4	2	9	6	7	14	10	8	4^{2}	**4**^{1}	9	4	14^{†}	8	120
6	(South Africa) Sheldon van der Linde	15	6	2	15	9	10	7	1	8	6	8	4	6	10^{2}	13	7	10	9	108
7	(France) Loïc Duval	3	7	Ret^{3}	8	7	8	**2**^{1}	4^{2}	9	4	Ret	9	10	13			4	6	108
8	(United Kingdom) Jamie Green	2	4	8	Ret	10	4	NC	12	13	7	14^{†}	15^{†}	Ret	15	8	5	3	3^{3}	98
9	(Germany) Marco Wittmann	11	10	4	3	5	9	14	8	3	9	3	5	15^{†}	8	10	8	Ret	11	95
10	(Austria) Ferdinand Habsburg	DNS	15	6	10	11	14	8	7	11	15	7	6^{2}	7	7	3^{2}	**10**^{1}	11	14	68
11	(South Africa) Jonathan Aberdein	10	9	15	9	14	7	6	13	10	8	6	10	11	11	4	Ret	5^{3}	7	62
12	(Austria) Lucas Auer	7	8	12	14	12	1	11	10	12	11	12	13	12	3	11	Ret	12	16	51
13	(Austria) Philipp Eng	6	11	9	7	8	12	13	9	6	10	4	12	9	14	12	Ret	9	10	48
14	(United Kingdom) Harrison Newey	13	Ret	10	12	15	13	12	15	14	13	11	11	5	6	7	9	Ret	13	27
15	(Poland) Robert Kubica	14	14	13	13	16	16	10	14	16	12	13	Ret	14	12	Ret	3	8	15	20
16	(Switzerland) Fabio Scherer	12	12	14	11	13	15	15	Ret	15	16^{†}	Ret	14	13	5	5	Ret	13^{†}	12	20
17	(France) Benoît Tréluyer															14	Ret			0
Pos.	Driver	SPA (Belgium)		LAU1 (Germany)		LAU2 (Germany)		ASS (Netherlands)		NÜR1 (Germany)		NÜR2 (Germany)		ZOL1 (Belgium)		ZOL2 (Belgium)		HOC (Germany)		Points

Colour	Result
Gold	Winner
Silver	Second place
Bronze	Third place
Green	Points classification
Blue	Non-points classification
Blue	Non-classified finish (NC)
Purple	Retired, not classified (Ret)
Red	Did not qualify (DNQ)
Red	Did not pre-qualify (DNPQ)
Black	Disqualified (DSQ)
White	Did not start (DNS)
White	Withdrew (WD)
White	Race cancelled (C)
Blank	Did not practice (DNP)
Blank	Did not arrive (DNA)
Blank	Excluded (EX)

**Bold** – Pole
Italics – Fastest Lap
1 – 3 Points for Pole
2 – 2 Points for P2
3 – 1 Point for P3

- † — Driver retired, but was classified as they completed 75% of the winner's race distance.

=== Teams' championship ===
Pos.	Team	Car	SPA (Belgium)		LAU1 (Germany)		LAU2 (Germany)		ASS (Netherlands)		NÜR1 (Germany)		NÜR2 (Germany)		ZOL1 (Belgium)		ZOL2 (Belgium)		HOC (Germany)		Points
1	(Germany) Audi Sport Team Abt Sportsline	4	**9**^{1}	2^{2}	**3**^{1}	**4**^{1}	3^{3}	**3**^{1}	1^{2}	2^{3}	5^{3}	1^{2}	1^{2}	2^{1}	2^{3}	Ret	2^{3}	Ret^{3}	7	5	609
1	(Germany) Audi Sport Team Abt Sportsline	51	1^{2}	1^{3}	1^{2}	2^{2}	**2**^{1}	5^{2}	3^{3}	3	**1**^{1}	**5**^{1}	5^{3}	1^{3}	3	9	6	2	1^{2}	2	609
2	(Germany) Audi Sport Team Rosberg	33	5^{3}	**3**^{1}	7	1^{3}	1^{2}	6^{3}	5	**5**^{1}	2^{2}	2^{3}	**2**^{1}	3	**1**^{1}	1^{3}	**1**^{1}	1^{2}	**2**^{1}	**1**^{1}	451
2	(Germany) Audi Sport Team Rosberg	53	2	4	8	Ret	10	4	NC	12	13	7	14^{†}	15^{†}	Ret	15	8	5	3	3^{3}	451
3	(Germany) Audi Sport Team Phoenix	19															14	Ret			247
3	(Germany) Audi Sport Team Phoenix	28	3	7	Ret^{3}	8	7	8	**2**^{1}	4^{2}	9	4	Ret	9	10	13			4	6	247
3	(Germany) Audi Sport Team Phoenix	99	4	5	11	5	6	11	4	11	4	3	9	7	8	2	Ret	6	6	4^{2}	247
4	(Germany) BMW Team RMG	11	11	10	4	3	5	9	14	8	3	9	3	5	15^{†}	8	10	8	Ret	11	215
4	(Germany) BMW Team RMG	16	8	13	5	6	4	2	9	6	7	14	10	8	4^{2}	**4**^{1}	9	4	14^{†}	8	215
5	(Belgium) BMW Team RBM	25	6	11	9	7	8	12	13	9	6	10	4	12	9	14	12	Ret	9	10	156
5	(Belgium) BMW Team RBM	31	15	6	2	15	9	10	7	1	8	6	8	4	6	10^{2}	13	7	10	9	156
6	(Belgium) BMW Team RMR	22	7	8	12	14	12	1	11	10	12	11	12	13	12	3	11	Ret	12	16	113
6	(Belgium) BMW Team RMR	27	10	9	15	9	14	7	6	13	10	8	6	10	11	11	4	Ret	5^{3}	7	113
7	(Belgium) Audi Sport Team WRT	10	13	Ret	10	12	15	13	12	15	14	13	11	11	5	6	7	9	Ret	13	103
7	(Belgium) Audi Sport Team WRT	13	12	12	14	11	13	15	15	Ret	15	16^{†}	Ret	14	13	5	5	Ret	13^{†}	12	103
7	(Belgium) Audi Sport Team WRT	62	DNS	15	6	10	11	14	8	7	11	15	7	6^{2}	7	7	3^{2}	**10**^{1}	11	14	103
8	(France) Orlen Team ART	8	14	14	13	13	16	16	10	14	16	12	13	Ret	14	12	Ret	3	8	15	20
Pos.	Team	Car	SPA (Belgium)		LAU1 (Germany)		LAU2 (Germany)		ASS (Netherlands)		NÜR1 (Germany)		NÜR2 (Germany)		ZOL1 (Belgium)		ZOL2 (Belgium)		HOC (Germany)		Points

=== Manufacturers' championship ===
Pos.	Manufacturer	SPA (Belgium)		LAU1 (Germany)		LAU2 (Germany)		ASS (Netherlands)		NÜR1 (Germany)		NÜR2 (Germany)		ZOL1 (Belgium)		ZOL2 (Belgium)		HOC (Germany)		Points
1	Audi	76	76	60	71	72	51	76	61	71	76	65	72	72	62	74	67	75	76	1253
2	BMW	19	15	42	31	28	51	17	39	33	15	39	27	24	37	15	37	16	13	500
Pos.	Manufacturer	SPA (Belgium)		LAU1 (Germany)		LAU2 (Germany)		ASS (Netherlands)		NÜR1 (Germany)		NÜR2 (Germany)		ZOL1 (Belgium)		ZOL2 (Belgium)		HOC (Germany)		Points

== Bibliography ==
- Upietz, Tim (11 December 2020). DTM 2020: Das offizielle Jahrbuch. Duisburg: Gruppe C Motorsport Verlag. ISBN 978-3-948501-09-9.
