= Class 1 Touring Cars =

Prototype racing cars

Class 1 Touring Cars refers to two generations of prototype silhouette-style touring car regulations employed by the FIA.

== First generation (1993–1996) ==
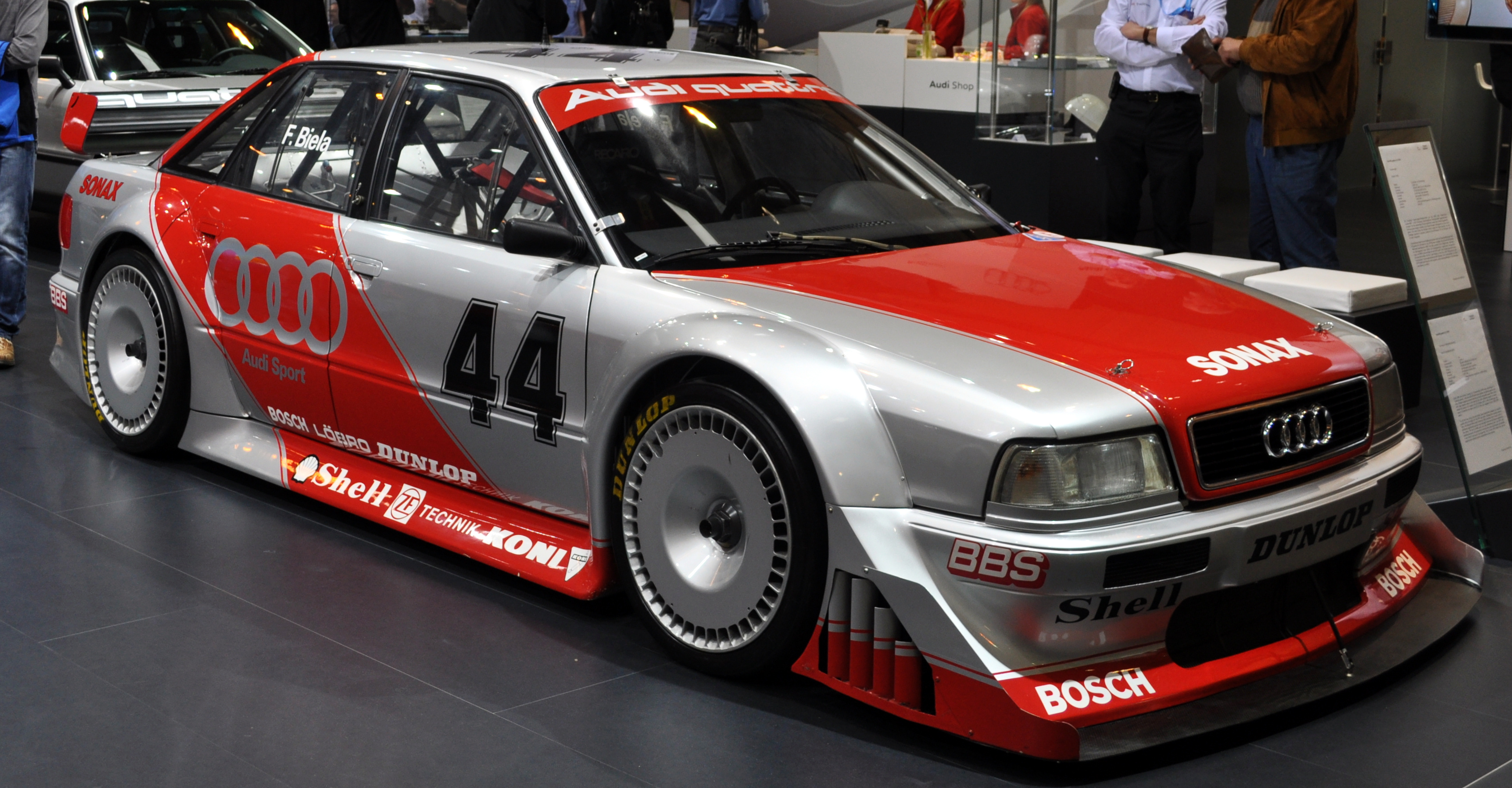
Audi 80 quattro Class 1 prototype (never raced)

The first generation was a production-based formula introduced in 1993 along with Class 2 Touring Cars, the latter officially becoming known as Super Touring cars from 1995. Class 1 permitted more liberal modifications to the vehicles than those allowed for Class 2 cars.

These Class 1 regulations restricted engines to a maximum of six cylinders, 2.5 litres capacity and four valves per cylinder. The basic unit had to be derived from a production engine made in quantity by the same manufacturer as the car, although it did not have to be from the same model as that being raced and could be extensively modified. All-wheel drive, traction control, anti-lock brakes and electronically controlled differentials were permitted. Aerodynamic aids were free below the wheel centreline and, from 1995, suspension systems could be purpose-built rather than production-based.

Class 1 Touring Cars contested the Deutsche Tourenwagen Meisterschaft (DTM) series from 1993 to 1995, the International Touring Car Series (ITC) in 1995 and for the International Touring Car Championship (ITC) in 1996.

Only three manufacturers, Alfa Romeo, Mercedes-Benz and Opel, competed in Class 1 during the short history of the original category, with genuine works efforts (Audi and BMW had built cars based on the B4 80 Quattro and E36 M3 respectively for the class, but never raced them) and the withdrawal of Alfa Romeo and Opel from the ITC at the end of 1996 effectively spelt the end of the class.

== Second generation (2019–present) ==
In early 2014, the DTM and the Japanese Super GT Series began a co-operation agreement in which the two series would begin to merge their technical regulations. This led to an official tie-up in September of the same year, with plans for the DTM to move to 2.0-litre inline-4 engines by 2017. Aerodynamic alterations were agreed in 2015, with the seeds sown for potential joint-races between the series.

Later in the same year however, the regulation changes were postponed to 2019 given DTM manufacturers' reluctance to potentially engage in more costly development. Super GT would also delay the implementation of the regulations to 2020, as the final regulations were signed off in 2018.

The second generation of Class 1 Touring Car is a purpose-built racer based on a two-door road-going model (though an exception was later made for the Honda Civic in Super GT). The cars feature a two-litre turbocharged inline-four engine, capped at 650 hp and mounted in the front of the car. Push-to-pass and DRS are employed on the DTM vehicles (but not in Super GT), which benefit from 3.4t of downforce. All vehicles must be front-engine, rear-wheel drive.

The first Class 1 cars debuted at the 2019 DTM Hockenheim round. DTM and Super GT conducted joint-races at the end of 2019, however both saw the previous generation Super GT GT500 cars enter. Aston Martin, entering DTM for the first time through the new regulations, concluded their program after a single season with constructors R-Motorsport claiming the cars were too expensive. Audi followed suit by announcing their departure from the series for the 2021 season in April 2020. The DTM eventually abandoned the regulation set after just two seasons and switched to a GT3–based formula from 2021, leaving Super GT as the only remaining series with these regulations for GT500 competitors although the GT300 category still uses Group GT3 rules to this day.

=== Specifications ===
- Engine displacement: 2.0 L (122 cu in) DOHC inline-4
- Engine management: Bosch Motronic MS 7.4 (Deutsche Tourenwagen Masters since 2019 and Super GT GT500 since 2020)
- Gearbox: 6-speed paddle shift gearbox (must have reverse)
- Weight:
  - 1,070 kg (2,359 lb) including driver and fuel (Deutsche Tourenwagen Masters)
  - 1,020 kg (2,249 lb) including driver and fuel (Super GT GT500)
- Power output:
  - Deutsche Tourenwagen Masters:
    - 2019: 610 + 30 hp (455 + 22 kW) with push-to-pass
    - 2020: 580 + 60 hp (433 + 45 kW) with push-to-pass
  - 550–650 PS (405–478 kW) (Super GT GT500)
- Fuel:
  - Aral Ultimate 102 unleaded (Deutsche Tourenwagen Masters)
  - Various (Super GT GT500)
- Fuel capacity: 31.7 US gallons (120 litres; 26 imperial gallons)
- Fuel delivery: Gasoline direct injection
- Fuel-mass flow restrictor rate: (Deutsche Tourenwagen Masters only)
  - 2019: 95 + 5 kg/h (209 + 11 lb/h) with push-to-pass
  - 2020: 90 + 10 kg/h (198 + 22 lb/h) with push-to-pass
- Fuel injection rail and injector pressure: Maximum 350 bar (5,076 psi)
- Aspiration: Single-turbocharged
- Turbocharger: Garrett TR35R 846519-15
- Turbo boost pressure: 3.5 bar (51 psi)
- Length: Not exceeding 5,000 mm (197 in) including rear wing; 4,650–4,725 mm (183–186 in) excluding rear wing
- Width: 1,950 mm (77 in)
- Wheelbase: 2,750 mm (108 in) restricted. Adjustable wheelbase banned
- Steering: Power-assisted rack and pinion
- Prohibited items: Traction control, active suspension and anti-lock braking systems

== List of FIA Class 1 homologated touring cars ==
=== First generation (1993–1996) ===
Marque	Picture	Model	Engine	First race	Last race
Alfa Romeo		155	Alfa Romeo Busso-based 2.5L V6 60° Alfa Romeo 690 2.5L V6 90°	1993 DTM – Zolder 1	1996 ITC – Suzuka
Mercedes-Benz		190E	Mercedes-Benz M102 2.5L I4	1993 DTM – Zolder 1	1993 DTM – Hockenheim 2
Mercedes-Benz		C-Class	Mercedes-Benz M106 2.5L V6 90°	1994 DTM – Zolder 1	1996 ITC – Suzuka
Opel		Calibra	General Motors C25XE 2.5L V6 54° Cosworth KF (Isuzu 6VD1 derived) 2.5L V6 75°	1993 DTM – Hockenheim 2	1996 ITC – Suzuka

=== Second generation (2019–present) ===
Marque	Picture	Model	Engine	First race	Last race
Aston Martin		Vantage	HWA AFR Turbo 2.0 I-4t	2019 DTM – Hockenheim 1	2019 DTM – Hockenheim 2
Audi		RS5 Turbo	Audi RC8 2.0 TFSI I-4t	2019 DTM – Hockenheim 1	2020 DTM – Hockenheim 2
BMW		M4 Turbo	BMW P48 Turbo 2.0 I-4t	2019 DTM – Hockenheim 1	2020 DTM – Hockenheim 2
Honda		NSX-GT	Honda HR-420E 2.0 I-4t	2020 Super GT – Fuji 1	2023 Super GT – Motegi
Honda		Civic Type R-GT	Honda HR-420E 2.0 I-4t	2024 Super GT – Okayama	2025 Super GT – Motegi
Honda		Prelude-GT	Honda HR-420E 2.0 I-4t	2026 Super GT – Okayama	
Nissan		GT-R Nismo	Nissan NR20A 2.0 I-4t	2020 Super GT – Fuji 1	2021 Super GT – Fuji 2
Nissan		Z	Nissan NR20A 2.0 I-4t	2022 Super GT – Okayama	
Toyota		GR Supra	Toyota RI4AG 2.0 I-4t	2020 Super GT – Fuji 1	

== See also ==
- Super Touring – FIA Class 2 Touring Cars
- Deutsche Tourenwagen Meisterschaft – The German Touring Car Championship
- Deutsche Tourenwagen Masters
- Super GT
