= HWA AFR Turbo engine =

HWA AFR Turbo

Overview
- Manufacturer: HWA (in partnership with Aston Martin)
- Production: 2019-2020 (DTM)

Layout
- Configuration: Inline-4 cylinder
- Displacement: 2.0 litres (122 cubic inches)
- Cylinder bore: 86–90 mm (3.39–3.54 in)
- Piston stroke: Free but typically approximately between 86–90 mm (3.39–3.54 in)
- Cylinder block material: Die cast steel or aluminium alloy. Machining process from a solid is not permitted
- Cylinder head material: Die cast steel or aluminium alloy
- Valvetrain: DOHC 16-valve (four-valves per cylinder)
- Compression ratio: 15:1

Combustion
- Turbocharger: Single-turbocharged by Garrett Advancing Motion with 3.5 bar (51 psi) of turbo boost pressure
- Fuel system: Bosch HDEV6 350 bar (5,076 psi) central high-pressure gasoline direct fuel injection. One direct injector per cylinder fed by an engine-driven high-pressure fuel pump
- Management: Bosch Motronic MS 7.4
- Fuel type: Aral Ultimate 102 RON unleaded racing gasoline
- Oil system: Dry sump. Total Quartz 9000
- Cooling system: Single mechanical water pump feeding a single-sided cooling system

Output
- Power output: 610 + 30 hp (455 + 22 kW) (2019) later 580 + 60 hp (433 + 45 kW) (2020-present) including push-to-pass
- Torque output: Approx. 650 N⋅m (479 ft⋅lbf) @ 9,000 rpm

Dimensions
- Length: 600 mm (23.62 in)
- Width: 697 mm (27.44 in)
- Height: 693 mm (27.28 in)
- Dry weight: 187 lb (85 kg) including turbocharger

The HWA AFR Turbo is a prototype four-stroke 2.0-litre single-turbocharged inline-4 gasoline racing engine, developed and produced jointly by HWA, in partnership and collaboration with Aston Martin, for Deutsche Tourenwagen Masters. The HWA inline-4 is engine rated at 610 + 30 hp (455 + 22 kW), with extra available on push-to-pass, and drives the rear wheels of the Vantage through a 6-speed semi-automatic transmission.

== Applications ==
- Aston Martin Vantage DTM
