= BMW P48 Turbo engine =

BMW P48 Turbo

Overview
- Manufacturer: BMW Motorsport
- Production: 2019–2020

Layout
- Configuration: Inline-4 cylinder
- Displacement: 2.0 litres (122 cubic inches)
- Cylinder bore: 86–90 mm (3.39–3.54 in)
- Piston stroke: Free but typically 86–90 mm (3.39–3.54 in)
- Cylinder block material: Aluminium alloy
- Cylinder head material: Aluminium alloy
- Valvetrain: DOHC 16-valve
- Compression ratio: 15:1

Combustion
- Turbocharger: Garret single-turbo, 3.5 bar (51 psi) boost pressure
- Fuel system: Bosch HDEV6 350 bar (5,076 psi) central high-pressure gasoline direct injectors, one per cylinder
- Management: Bosch Motronic MS 7.4
- Fuel type: Aral Ultimate 102 RON unleaded racing gasoline
- Oil system: Dry sump. Shell Helix Ultra
- Cooling system: Single mechanical water pump feeding a single-sided cooling system

Output
- Power output: 610 + 30 hp (455 + 22 kW) (2019) later 580 + 60 hp (433 + 45 kW) (2020-present) including push-to-pass
- Torque output: Approx. 650 N⋅m (479 lb⋅ft) @ 9,000 rpm

Dimensions
- Length: 600 mm (23.62 in)
- Width: 697 mm (27.44 in)
- Height: 693 mm (27.28 in)
- Dry weight: 187 lb (85 kg) including turbocharger

Chronology
- Predecessor: BMW P66 Series (V8)

The BMW P48 Turbo is a prototype four-stroke 2.0-litre single-turbocharged inline-4 racing engine, developed and produced by BMW Motorsport for Deutsche Tourenwagen Masters. The P48 Turbo engine is full custom-built but partially borrows the cylinder blocks from BMW B48 road car engine which had a same displacement. BMW P48 Turbo is the first-ever turbocharged DTM engine to date, replacing the aging BMW P66 Series (P66/1) V8 engine after seven-years of service and conform the "Class 1" regulations that shared with Japanese Super GT under Nippon Race Engine (NRE) formula. BMW P48 Turbo engine currently competes with engine competitors Audi RC8 2.0 TFSI and HWA AFR Turbo 2.0.

== Debut and public unveil ==
The BMW P48 Turbo engine was made a first shakedown debut fitted with BMW M4 Turbo DTM car on 27 October 2018 at near BMW headquarters in Munich, Germany in the hands of Bruno Spengler. The BMW P48 Turbo engine was publicly unveiled on 25 April 2019 including comparison with first BMW 2002 Turbo engine and made an official race début on 3 May 2019 at Hockenheimring.

== Applications ==
- BMW M4 Turbo DTM
