= 2019 1st Hockenheim DTM round =

(Germany) 2019 DTM Hockenheim round
Event Information
- Round 1 of 9 in the 2019 Deutsche Tourenwagen Masters
- Date: 4–5 May 2019 Deutsche Tourenwagen Masters
- Location: Hockenheim, Germany
- Venue: Hockenheimring
- Weather: Saturday: Rain; Sunday: Light cloud

Results
Race 1
Distance	34 laps	155.516 km
Pole position	(Germany) Marco Wittmann; BMW Team RMG	1:48.215
Winner	(Germany) Marco Wittmann; BMW Team RMG	1:03:30.158
Race 2
Distance	37 laps	169.238 km
Pole position	(Austria) Philipp Eng; BMW Team RBM	1:28.972
Winner	(Germany) René Rast; Audi Sport Team Rosberg	58:53.819

The 2019 DTM Hockenheim round is a motor racing event for the Deutsche Tourenwagen Masters held between 4 and 5 May 2019. The event, part of the 33rd season of the DTM, was held at the Hockenheimring in Germany.

== Results ==
=== Race 1 ===
==== Qualifying ====
Pos.	No.	Driver	Team	Car	Time	Gap	Grid	Pts
1	11	(Germany) Marco Wittmann	BMW Team RMG	BMW M4 Turbo DTM	1:48.215		1	3
2	99	(Germany) Mike Rockenfeller	Audi Sport Team Phoenix	Audi RS5 Turbo DTM	1:48.281	+0.066	2	2
3	3	(United Kingdom) Paul di Resta	R-Motorsport	Aston Martin Vantage DTM	1:49.191	+0.976	3	1
4	33	(Germany) René Rast	Audi Sport Team Rosberg	Audi RS5 Turbo DTM	1:49.510	+1.295	4	
5	4	(Netherlands) Robin Frijns	Audi Sport Team Abt	Audi RS5 Turbo DTM	1:49.535	+1.320	5	
6	76	(United Kingdom) Jake Dennis	R-Motorsport	Aston Martin Vantage DTM	1:49.762	+1.547	6	
7	31	(South Africa) Sheldon van der Linde	BMW Team RBM	BMW M4 Turbo DTM	1:50.331	+2.116	7	
8	16	(Germany) Timo Glock	BMW Team RMR	BMW M4 Turbo DTM	1:50.509	+2.294	8	
9	47	(Sweden) Joel Eriksson	BMW Team RBM	BMW M4 Turbo DTM	1:50.626	+2.411	9	
10	51	(Switzerland) Nico Müller	Audi Sport Team Abt	Audi RS5 Turbo DTM	1:50.839	+2.624	10	
11	23	(Spain) Daniel Juncadella	R-Motorsport	Aston Martin Vantage DTM	1:50.884	+2.669	11	
12	28	(France) Loïc Duval	Audi Sport Team Phoenix	Audi RS5 Turbo DTM	1:50.909	+2.694	12	
13	53	(United Kingdom) Jamie Green	Audi Sport Team Rosberg	Audi RS5 Turbo DTM	1:50.914	+2.699	13	
14	7	(Canada) Bruno Spengler	BMW Team RMG	BMW M4 Turbo DTM	1:51.094	+2.879	14	
15	21	(Brazil) Pietro Fittipaldi	Audi Sport Team WRT	Audi RS5 Turbo DTM	1:51.287	+3.072	15	
16	62	(Austria) Ferdinand von Habsburg	R-Motorsport	Aston Martin Vantage DTM	1:55.470	+7.255	16	
NC	25	(Austria) Philipp Eng	BMW Team RMR	BMW M4 Turbo DTM	No time		17	
NC	27	(South Africa) Jonathan Aberdein	Audi Sport Team WRT	Audi RS5 Turbo DTM	No time		18	

==== Race ====
Pos	No.	Driver	Team	Car	Laps	Time / Retired	Grid	Pts
1	11	(Germany) Marco Wittmann	BMW Team RMG	BMW M4 Turbo DTM	34	1:03:30.158	1	25
2	99	(Germany) Mike Rockenfeller	Audi Sport Team Phoenix	Audi RS5 Turbo DTM	34	+13.727	2	18
3	4	(Netherlands) Robin Frijns	Audi Sport Team Abt	Audi RS5 Turbo DTM	34	+34.681	5	15
4	16	(Germany) Timo Glock	BMW Team RMR	BMW M4 Turbo DTM	34	+37.407	8	12
5	28	(France) Loïc Duval	Audi Sport Team Phoenix	Audi RS5 Turbo DTM	34	+1:03.383	12	10
6	31	(South Africa) Sheldon van der Linde	BMW Team RBM	BMW M4 Turbo DTM	34	+1:05.453	7	8
7	7	(Canada) Bruno Spengler	BMW Team RMG	BMW M4 Turbo DTM	34	+1:13.886	14	6
8	51	(Switzerland) Nico Müller	Audi Sport Team Abt	Audi RS5 Turbo DTM	34	+1:29.780	10	4
9	23	(Spain) Daniel Juncadella	R-Motorsport	Aston Martin Vantage DTM	34	+1:30.322	11	2
10	21	(Brazil) Pietro Fittipaldi	Audi Sport Team WRT	Audi RS5 Turbo DTM	34	+1:31.873	15	1
11	76	(United Kingdom) Jake Dennis	R-Motorsport	Aston Martin Vantage DTM	34	+1:36.899	6	
12	53	(United Kingdom) Jamie Green	Audi Sport Team Rosberg	Audi RS5 Turbo DTM	33	+1 Lap	13	
13	47	(Sweden) Joel Eriksson	BMW Team RBM	BMW M4 Turbo DTM	33	+1 Lap	9	
14	25	(Austria) Philipp Eng	BMW Team RMR	BMW M4 Turbo DTM	33	+1 Lap	17	
15	27	(South Africa) Jonathan Aberdein	Audi Sport Team WRT	Audi RS5 Turbo DTM	33	+1 Lap	18	
16	33	(Germany) René Rast	Audi Sport Team Rosberg	Audi RS5 Turbo DTM	28	Mechanical^{1}	4	
Ret	3	(United Kingdom) Paul di Resta	R-Motorsport	Aston Martin Vantage DTM	17	Mechanical	3	
Ret	62	(Austria) Ferdinand von Habsburg	R-Motorsport	Aston Martin Vantage DTM	2	Mechanical	16	
Fastest lap set by Sheldon van der Linde: 1:42.554

^1 — Driver retired, but was classified as they completed 75% of the winner's race distance.

=== Race 2 ===
==== Qualifying ====
Pos.	No.	Driver	Team	Car	Time	Gap	Grid	Pts
1	25	(Austria) Philipp Eng	BMW Team RMR	BMW M4 Turbo DTM	1:28.972		1	3
2	11	(Germany) Marco Wittmann	BMW Team RMG	BMW M4 Turbo DTM	1:29.388	+0.416	2	2
3	4	(Netherlands) Robin Frijns	Audi Sport Team Abt	Audi RS5 Turbo DTM	1:29.712	+0.740	3	1
4	51	(Switzerland) Nico Müller	Audi Sport Team Abt	Audi RS5 Turbo DTM	1:29.734	+0.762	4	
5	7	(Canada) Bruno Spengler	BMW Team RMG	BMW M4 Turbo DTM	1:29.899	+0.927	5	
6	16	(Germany) Timo Glock	BMW Team RMR	BMW M4 Turbo DTM	1:29.910	+0.938	6	
7	53	(United Kingdom) Jamie Green	Audi Sport Team Rosberg	Audi RS5 Turbo DTM	1:29.911	+0.939	7	
8	28	(France) Loïc Duval	Audi Sport Team Phoenix	Audi RS5 Turbo DTM	1:29.915	+0.943	8	
9	47	(Sweden) Joel Eriksson	BMW Team RBM	BMW M4 Turbo DTM	1:29.920	+0.948	9	
10	31	(South Africa) Sheldon van der Linde	BMW Team RBM	BMW M4 Turbo DTM	1:29.957	+0.985	10	
11	99	(Germany) Mike Rockenfeller	Audi Sport Team Phoenix	Audi RS5 Turbo DTM	1:30.088	+1.116	11	
12	27	(South Africa) Jonathan Aberdein	Audi Sport Team WRT	Audi RS5 Turbo DTM	1:30.122	+1.150	12	
13	21	(Brazil) Pietro Fittipaldi	Audi Sport Team WRT	Audi RS5 Turbo DTM	1:30.126	+1.154	13	
14	23	(Spain) Daniel Juncadella	R-Motorsport	Aston Martin Vantage DTM	1:30.273	+1.301	14	
15	3	(United Kingdom) Paul di Resta	R-Motorsport	Aston Martin Vantage DTM	1:30.403	+1.431	15	
16	33	(Germany) René Rast	Audi Sport Team Rosberg	Audi RS5 Turbo DTM	1:30.568	+1.596	16	
17	62	(Austria) Ferdinand von Habsburg	R-Motorsport	Aston Martin Vantage DTM	1:30.702	+1.730	17	
18	76	(United Kingdom) Jake Dennis	R-Motorsport	Aston Martin Vantage DTM	1:31.031	+2.059	18	

==== Race ====
Pos	No.	Driver	Team	Car	Laps	Time / Retired	Grid	Pts
1	33	(Germany) René Rast	Audi Sport Team Rosberg	Audi RS5 Turbo DTM	37	58:53.819	16	25
2	51	(Switzerland) Nico Müller	Audi Sport Team Abt	Audi RS5 Turbo DTM	37	+11.922	4	18
3	4	(Netherlands) Robin Frijns	Audi Sport Team Abt	Audi RS5 Turbo DTM	37	+12.184	3	15
4	25	(Austria) Philipp Eng	BMW Team RMR	BMW M4 Turbo DTM	37	+17.952	1	12
5	7	(Canada) Bruno Spengler	BMW Team RMG	BMW M4 Turbo DTM	37	+22.769	5	10
6	16	(Germany) Timo Glock	BMW Team RMR	BMW M4 Turbo DTM	37	+37.615	6	8
7	3	(United Kingdom) Paul di Resta	R-Motorsport	Aston Martin Vantage DTM	37	+37.920	15	6
8	11	(Germany) Marco Wittmann	BMW Team RMG	BMW M4 Turbo DTM	37	+44.294	2	4
9	53	(United Kingdom) Jamie Green	Audi Sport Team Rosberg	Audi RS5 Turbo DTM	37	+47.031	7	2
10	47	(Sweden) Joel Eriksson	BMW Team RBM	BMW M4 Turbo DTM	37	+49.079	9	1
11	76	(United Kingdom) Jake Dennis	R-Motorsport	Aston Martin Vantage DTM	37	+49.114	18	
12	62	(Austria) Ferdinand von Habsburg	R-Motorsport	Aston Martin Vantage DTM	37	+1:04.833	17	
13	31	(South Africa) Sheldon van der Linde	BMW Team RBM	BMW M4 Turbo DTM	37	+1:16.566	10	
14	27	(South Africa) Jonathan Aberdein	Audi Sport Team WRT	Audi RS5 Turbo DTM	37	+1:18.396	12	
15	21	(Brazil) Pietro Fittipaldi	Audi Sport Team WRT	Audi RS5 Turbo DTM	36	+1 Lap	13	
16	23	(Spain) Daniel Juncadella	R-Motorsport	Aston Martin Vantage DTM	34	+3 Laps	14	
Ret	99	(Germany) Mike Rockenfeller	Audi Sport Team Phoenix	Audi RS5 Turbo DTM	7	Mechanical	11	
Ret	28	(France) Loïc Duval	Audi Sport Team Phoenix	Audi RS5 Turbo DTM	6	Crash	8	
Fastest lap set by Pietro Fittipaldi: 1:30.401

== Championship standings ==
Drivers Championship

Pos	Driver	Pts	Gap
1	(Germany) Marco Wittmann	34	
2	(Netherlands) Robin Frijns	31	-3
3	(Germany) René Rast	25	-9
4	(Switzerland) Nico Müller	22	-12
5	(Germany) Mike Rockenfeller	20	-14
5	(Germany) Timo Glock	20	-14

Teams Championship

Pos	Team	Pts	Gap
1	(Germany) Audi Sport Team Abt (4, 51)	53	
2	(Germany) BMW Team RMG (7, 11)	50	-3
3	(Belgium) BMW Team RMR (16, 25)	35	-18
4	(Germany) Audi Sport Team Phoenix (28, 99)	30	-23
5	(Germany) Audi Sport Team Rosberg (33, 53)	27	-26

Manufacturers Championship

Pos	Drivers	Pts	Gap
1	(Germany) Audi	110	
2	(Germany) BMW	93	-17
3	(United Kingdom) Aston Martin	9	-101

- Note: Only the top five positions are included for three sets of standings.

== See also ==
- 2019 W Series Hockenheim round

Previous race: 2018 DTM Hockenheim Final	Deutsche Tourenwagen Masters; 2019 season	Next race: 2019 DTM Zolder round
