= R-Motorsport =

Swiss motor racing team

(Switzerland) R-Motorsport
- Founded: 2015
- Base: Niederwil bei Gossau, Sankt Gallen
- Team principal(s): Florian Kamelger
- Former series: Deutsche Tourenwagen Masters; GT World Challenge Europe; GT4 European Series; Intercontinental GT Challenge

R-Motorsport was a Swiss motor racing team founded in 2015. The team raced Aston Martins as they are affiliated with the dealership in Sankt Gallen; the only one in Switzerland.

== History ==
Founded in late 2015, R-Motorsport would spend its formative years as part of a tie-up with parent company AF Racing AG and Red Bull Advanced Technologies working on the Aston Martin Valkyrie before entering the Blancpain Endurance Series in 2018. The team found success quickly, winning just their second race at Silverstone with Jake Dennis, Nicki Thiim and Matthieu Vaxivière – aiding the trio to 13th in the championship. The team then went on to represent the Aston Martin marque at the 2019 Bathurst 12 Hour, and in the last race for the V12 Vantage scored a shock pole position and second placing.

HWA Racelab would then coax the Swiss squad into the Deutsche Tourenwagen Masters to replace their outgoing Mercedes-Benz association for 2019. The Vantage DTM broke cover just days before their pre-season team test in Jerez having been built in less than 100 days due to time constraints. Despite Paul di Resta's third-place in the first qualifying session at the Hockenheimring, all four cars struggled with copious mechanical problems. Daniel Juncadella scored the team's best result of sixth at the first race in Nuremberg, with Di Resta on course for a surprise win at Brands Hatch before he was falsely penalised for jumping the start. R-Motorsport and HWA – the engine builder for the program – would point the blame at each other for the poor season, withdrawing from the DTM's joint race with Super GT at Fuji Speedway in November before the partnership eventually split. With both entities owning vehicle IP, Aston Martin was withdrawn from the DTM ahead of 2020 and all four cars were sold to a Hong Kong buyer. The team continued their GT program in conjunction with their DTM entry, with Dennis, Marvin Kirchhöfer and Alex Lynn scoring a podium in the team's last race of the year.

2020 began with a two-car assault on the Bathurst 12 Hour, but only one car started the race after Kirchhöfer flipped the #62 car in qualifying. Dennis, Scott Dixon and Rick Kelly finished the race 16th outright, two laps down.

== Results ==
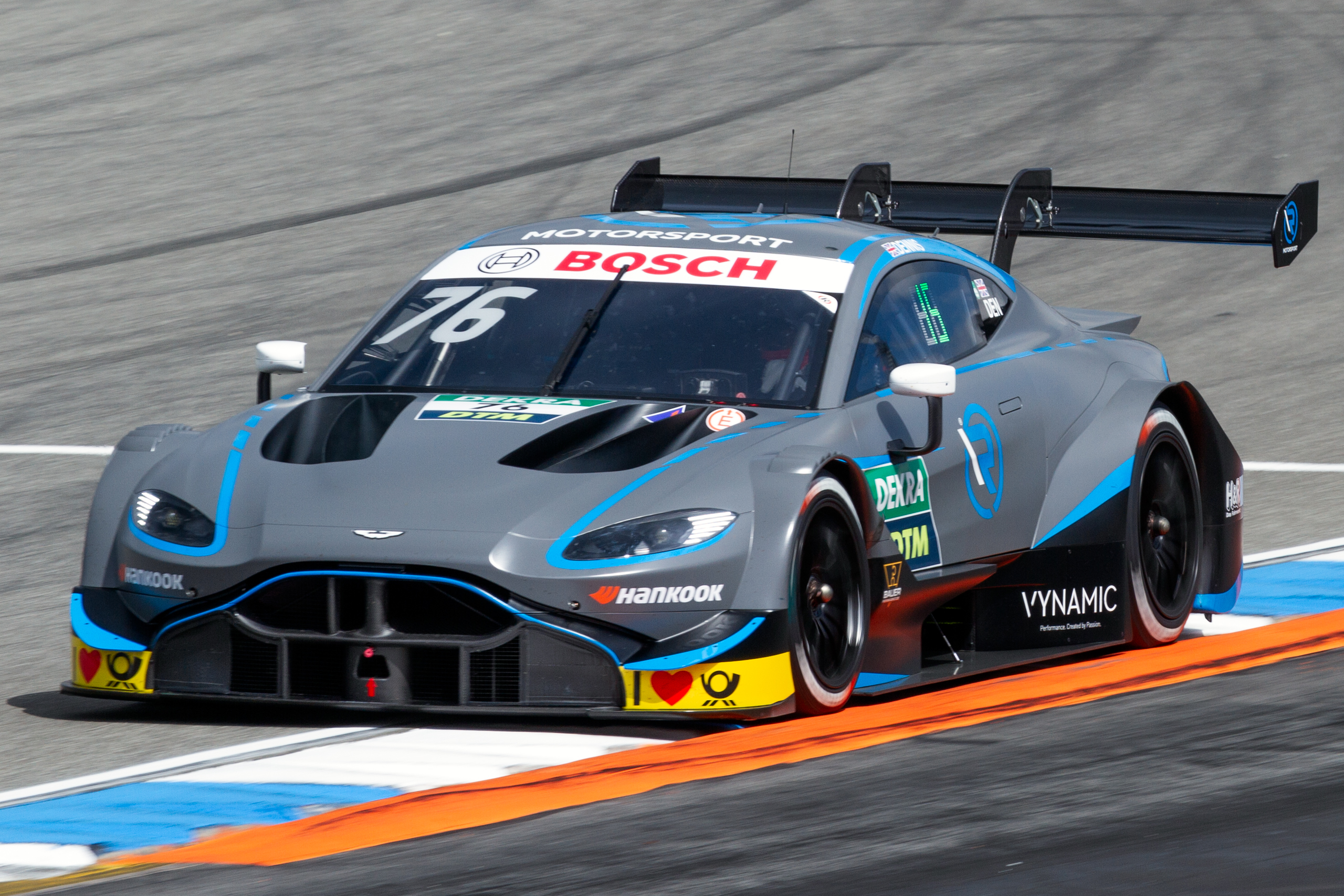
Jake Dennis driving the Aston Martin Vantage DTM at the Hockenheimring in 2019.

=== GT World Challenge Europe Endurance Series results ===
Year	Car	No.	Drivers	Class	1	2	3	4	5	6	7	T.C.	Points
2018	Aston Martin V12 Vantage GT3	62	(United Kingdom) Alex Brundle	P	MNZ; 9	SIL; 5	LEC; 38					9th	40
2018	Aston Martin V12 Vantage GT3	62	(Germany) Marvin Kirchhöfer	P	MNZ; 9	SIL; 5	LEC; 38	SPA6; 17	SPA12; 17	SPA24; 35	BAR; 19	9th	40
2018	Aston Martin V12 Vantage GT3	62	(Belgium) Maxime Martin	P	MNZ; 9	SIL; 5	LEC; 38	SPA6; 17	SPA12; 17	SPA24; 35	BAR; 19	9th	40
2018	Aston Martin V12 Vantage GT3	62	(Austria) Dominik Baumann	P				SPA6; 17	SPA12; 17	SPA24; 35	BAR; 19	9th	40
2018	Aston Martin V12 Vantage GT3	76	(United Kingdom) Jake Dennis	P	MNZ; Ret	SIL; 1	LEC; 31	SPA6; 13	SPA12; 11	SPA24; 9	BAR; 40	9th	40
2018	Aston Martin V12 Vantage GT3	76	(Denmark) Nicki Thiim	P	MNZ; Ret	SIL; 1	LEC; 31	SPA6; 13	SPA12; 11	SPA24; 9	BAR; 40	9th	40
2018	Aston Martin V12 Vantage GT3	76	(France) Matthieu Vaxivière	P	MNZ; Ret	SIL; 1	LEC; 31	SPA6; 13	SPA12; 11	SPA24; 9	BAR; 40	9th	40
2019	Aston Martin Vantage AMR GT3	62	(Belgium) Maxime Martin	P	MNZ; 37	SIL; 17	LEC; 10	SPA6; 64	SPA12; 64	SPA24; Ret	BAR; 17	7th	39
2019	Aston Martin Vantage AMR GT3	62	(United Kingdom) Matt Parry	P	MNZ; 37	SIL; 17	LEC; 10	SPA6; 64	SPA12; 64	SPA24; Ret	BAR; 17	7th	39
2019	Aston Martin Vantage AMR GT3	62	(France) Matthieu Vaxivière	P	MNZ; 37	SIL; 17	LEC; 10	SPA6; 64	SPA12; 64	SPA24; Ret	BAR; 17	7th	39
2019	Aston Martin Vantage AMR GT3	76	(Denmark) Nicki Thiim	P	MNZ; 19	SIL; DNS						7th	39
2019	Aston Martin Vantage AMR GT3	76	(United Kingdom) Jake Dennis	P	MNZ; 19	SIL; DNS	LEC; 4	SPA6; 5	SPA12; 25	SPA24; 19	BAR; 2	7th	39
2019	Aston Martin Vantage AMR GT3	76	(Germany) Marvin Kirchhöfer	P	MNZ; 19	SIL; DNS	LEC; 4	SPA6; 5	SPA12; 25	SPA24; 19	BAR; 2	7th	39
2019	Aston Martin Vantage AMR GT3	76	(United Kingdom) Alex Lynn	P			LEC; 4	SPA6; 5	SPA12; 25	SPA24; 19	BAR; 2	7th	39
2019	Aston Martin Vantage AMR GT3	762	(United Kingdom) Ricky Collard	S				SPA6; 68	SPA12; 68	SPA24; Ret		7th	39
2019	Aston Martin Vantage AMR GT3	762	(Austria) Ferdinand Habsburg	S				SPA6; 68	SPA12; 68	SPA24; Ret		7th	39
2019	Aston Martin Vantage AMR GT3	762	(Switzerland) Hugo de Sadeleer	S				SPA6; 68	SPA12; 68	SPA24; Ret		7th	39
2019	Aston Martin Vantage AMR GT3	762	(Finland) Aaro Vainio	S				SPA6; 68	SPA12; 68	SPA24; Ret		7th	39

=== Deutsche Tourenwagen Masters results ===
Year	Entrant	Car	No.	Drivers	1	2	3	4	5	6	7	8	9	10	11	12	13	14	15	16	17	18	T.C.	Points
Year	Entrant	Car	No.	Drivers	(Germany) HOC1		(Belgium) ZOL		(Italy) MIS		(Germany) NRM		(Netherlands) ASS		(United Kingdom) BRH		(Germany) LAU		(Germany) NÜR		(Germany) HOC2			
2019	(Switzerland) R-Motorsport I	Aston Martin Vantage DTM	3	(United Kingdom) Paul di Resta	Ret^{3}	7	8	DNS	16	Ret	12	Ret	14	8	14†	14	13	Ret	12	DNS	7	DNS	8th	38
2019	(Switzerland) R-Motorsport I	Aston Martin Vantage DTM	76	(United Kingdom) Jake Dennis	11	11	Ret	6	15	13	9	12	12	Ret	Ret	9	11	Ret	Ret	14	11	8	8th	38
2019	(Switzerland) R-Motorsport II	Aston Martin Vantage DTM	23	(Spain) Daniel Juncadella	9	16†	Ret	Ret	13	14	6	10	Ret	7	10	8	12	12	10	12	Ret	Ret	9th	26
2019	(Switzerland) R-Motorsport II	Aston Martin Vantage DTM	62	(Austria) Ferdinand von Habsburg	Ret	12	9	Ret	14	12	10	11	13	12	15†	11	15	Ret	11	15	DNS	11	9th	26

^{3} – One point for 3rd in qualifying.
† – Did not finish, but was classified having completed 90% of the race distance.

=== Complete Bathurst 12 Hour results ===
Year	Car#	Drivers	Car	Class	Laps	Pos.	Class Pos.
2019	62	(United Kingdom) Jake Dennis (Germany) Marvin Kirchhöfer (France) Matthieu Vaxivière	Aston Martin V12 Vantage GT3	APP	312	2nd	2nd
2019	760	(Switzerland) Andreas Bänziger (Austria) Florian Kamelger (Australia) Peter Leemhuis (United Kingdom) Matt Parry	Aston Martin V12 Vantage GT3	GT3 Pro-Am	168	DNF	DNF
2020	62	(United Kingdom) Oliver Caldwell (Italy) Luca Ghiotto (Germany) Marvin Kirchhöfer	Aston Martin Vantage AMR GT3	GT3 Pro	0	WD	WD
2020	76	(United Kingdom) Jake Dennis (New Zealand) Scott Dixon (Australia) Rick Kelly	Aston Martin Vantage AMR GT3	GT3 Pro	308	16th	10th
