= Audi RC8 2.0 TFSI engine =

Audi RC8 2.0 TFSI

Overview
- Manufacturer: Audi Sport GmbH
- Production: 2019-2020 (DTM)

Layout
- Configuration: Inline-4 cylinder
- Displacement: 2.0 litres (122 cubic inches)
- Cylinder bore: 86–90 mm (3.39–3.54 in)
- Piston stroke: Free but typically approximately between 86–90 mm (3.39–3.54 in)
- Cylinder block material: Die cast steel or aluminium alloy. Machining process from a solid is not permitted
- Cylinder head material: Die cast steel or aluminium alloy
- Valvetrain: DOHC 16-valve (four-valves per cylinder)
- Compression ratio: 15:1

Combustion
- Turbocharger: Single-turbocharged by Garrett Advancing Motion with 3.5 bar (51 psi) of turbo boost pressure
- Fuel system: Bosch HDEV6 350 bar (5,076 psi) central high-pressure gasoline direct fuel injection. One direct injector per cylinder fed by an engine-driven high-pressure fuel pump
- Management: Bosch Motronic MS 7.4
- Fuel type: Aral Ultimate 102 RON unleaded racing gasoline
- Oil system: Dry sump. Castrol EDGE SUPERCAR and Total Quartz (WRT)
- Cooling system: Single mechanical water pump feeding a single-sided cooling system

Output
- Power output: 610 + 30 hp (455 + 22 kW) (2019) later 580 + 60 hp (433 + 45 kW) (2020-present) including push-to-pass
- Torque output: Approx. 650 N⋅m (479 ft⋅lbf) @ 9,000 rpm

Dimensions
- Length: 600 mm (23.62 in)
- Width: 697 mm (27.44 in)
- Height: 693 mm (27.28 in)
- Dry weight: 187 lb (85 kg) including turbocharger

Chronology
- Predecessor: Audi DTM V8

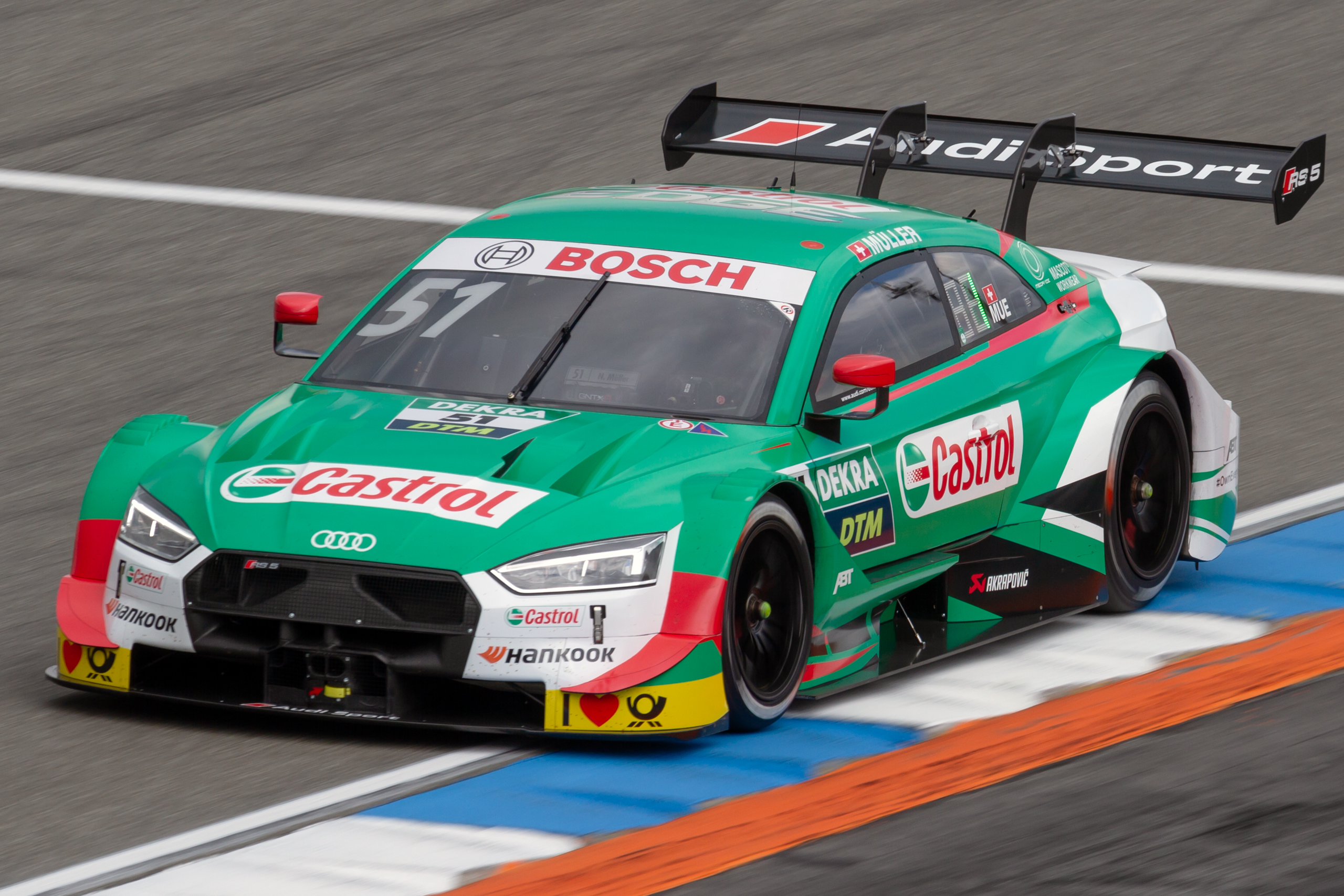
Audi RS5 Turbo DTM

The Audi RC8 2.0 TFSI is a prototype four-stroke 2.0-litre single-turbocharged inline-4 gasoline racing engine, developed and produced by Audi Sport GmbH for Deutsche Tourenwagen Masters. The RC8 2.0 TFSI engine is full custom-built but partially borrows the cylinder blocks from Volkswagen-Audi EA888 2.0 R4 16v TSI/TFSI road car engine which had a same displacement. Audi RC8 2.0 TFSI was shakedown on 15 November 2018 and later made public unveil on 20 March 2019 after more engine dyno test. Audi RC8 TFSI is the first-ever turbocharged DTM engine to date, replacing the aging Audi DTM V8 engine after nineteen-years of service which conform the "Class 1" regulations that shared with Japanese Super GT under Nippon Race Engine (NRE) formula.

The RC8 2.0 TFSI engine also featuring push-to-pass system which produces 30 hp (22 kW) later 60 hp (45 kW) for more overtaking manoeuvre improvement.

== Applications ==
- Audi RS5 Turbo DTM
- Audi RS Q e-tron (generator)
