= Audi RS5 Turbo DTM =

Racing car model

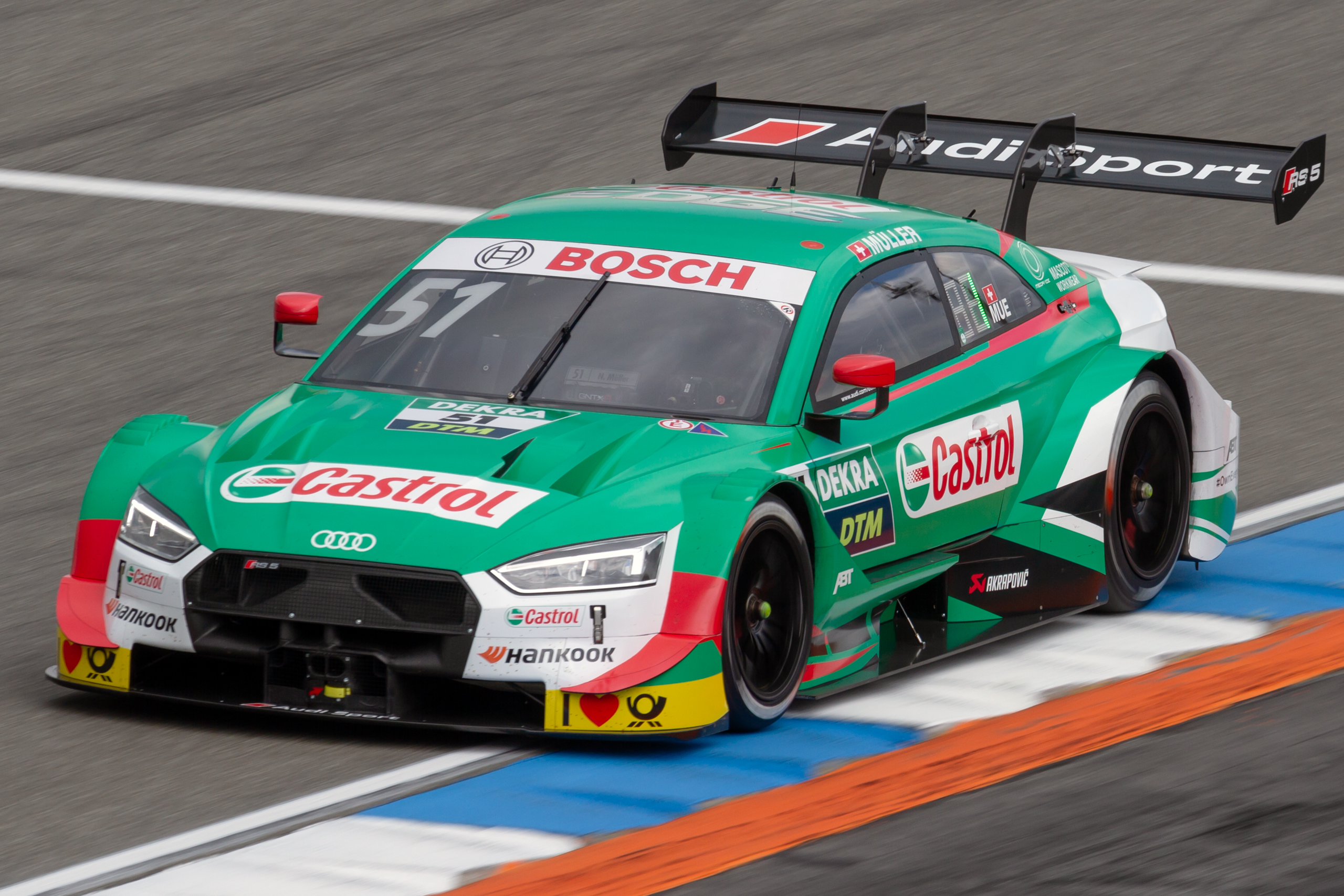
- The Audi RS5 Turbo DTM driven by Nico Müller.
- Category: Deutsche Tourenwagen Masters Class 1 touring car and Super GT GT500 Class 1 sports car
- Constructor: (Germany) Audi
- Predecessor: Audi RS5 DTM (NA)
- Successor: Audi R8 GT3

Technical specifications
- Length: 4,958 mm (195.2 in)
- Width: 1,950 mm (76.8 in)
- Height: 1,150 mm (45.3 in)
- Engine: Audi RC8 2.0 TFSI 2.0 L I4 turbocharged, front engined, longitudinally mounted
- Power: 610 + 30 hp (455 + 22 kW) (2019) later 580 + 60 hp (433 + 45 kW) (2020–present) including push-to-pass
- Weight: 981 kg (2,163 lb)
- Tyres: Hankook

Competition history
- Notable entrants: (Germany) Abt Sportsline (Germany) Phoenix Racing (Germany) (Finland) Team Rosberg (Belgium) Team WRT (DBA Audi Japan Team Hitotsuyama for Super GT × DTM Dream Race at Fuji Speedway only)
- Notable drivers: (Netherlands) Robin Frijns (Switzerland) Nico Müller (France) Loïc Duval (Germany) Mike Rockenfeller (United Kingdom) Jamie Green (Germany) René Rast (South Africa) Jonathan Aberdein (Brazil) Pietro Fittipaldi (Italy) Andrea Dovizioso (United Kingdom) Harrison Newey (Switzerland) Fabio Scherer (Austria) Ferdinand Zvonimir von Habsburg (France) Benoît Tréluyer
- Debut: 2019 DTM Hockenheim round
Races	Wins	Poles	F/Laps
38 (including Super GT × DTM Dream Race non-championship joint-event at Fuji Speedway)	28	30	28
- Constructors' Championships: 2 (2019 and 2020)
- Drivers' Championships: 2 (2019 and 2020)

The Audi RS5 Turbo DTM is a Class One Touring Car constructed by the German car manufacturer Audi AG for use in the Deutsche Tourenwagen Masters. The car was an updated version of the previous Audi RS5 DTM that had a naturally aspirated engine. The Audi RS5 Turbo DTM would remain to be based on the production Audi RS5 car. The car made its DTM debut in the 2019 season under "Class 1" regulations and was used until the 2020 season. The RS5 Turbo is Audi's first-turbo powered DTM car.

With a total of 12 wins, 12 pole positions, 18 podium finishes and a total record of 1,132 manufacturer's championship points in 2019, the RS5 Turbo DTM is statistically the fourth most dominant DTM car in the history of the sport with a win percentage of 66.67% against the sport's most dominant car, the 2003 Mercedes CLK DTM with a record of 90%. The car brought Audi its first year of domination in its history in the sport.

At the end of the 2020 season, Audi Sport left DTM after 31 years of participation (with an exception of 1993–1996) as they will be focusing on Formula E. This was the last Audi vehicle in DTM before they left the sport.

== Design ==
=== Chassis ===
Audi carried over the RS5 DTM car to undergo a major development for the Class 1 project which will be used for the 2019 season and beyond and rebrand it as Audi RS5 Turbo DTM. The aerodynamic packages of the RS5 Turbo DTM also has significant change including front splitter length cut to 90 millimetres, radiator grill revamp, rear wing width increased to 520 millimetres and also DRS improvement to make cars aggressive for overtaking compared to the Audi RS5 DTM naturally-aspirated. The car made its first shakedown at Circuito do Estoril on 8 November 2018.

The design also features the newly-firewall interior cockpit protection to deflect debris away from a driver's head in the event of an accident.

=== Engine ===
The RS5 Turbo DTM features a brand new engine package built specifically for the car that is based on Japanese Super GT GT500 Class 1 regulations which were dubbed Nippon Race Engine (NRE). The aging Audi 4.0 L (244 cu in) V8 naturally-aspirated engine—which had been used since the inaugural season of the Deutsche Tourenwagen Masters—was replaced by a 2.0 L (122 cu in) inline-4 turbocharged direct-injected RC8 engine developed by Audi which was fully custom-built but the cylinder blocks were borrowed from the Volkswagen-Audi EA888 2.0 R4 16v TSI/TFSI. During the car's shakedown and preliminary testing phase at the Circuito do Estoril, drivers noted that the change from natural aspiration to a turbocharger meant that the RS5 Turbo DTM required a different driving style to its predecessor, the Audi RS5 DTM NA, as the turbocharger produced more torque and thus required the driver to exercise greater control over the throttle. The Audi RC8 TFSI I-4 turbo engine will also feature the push-to-pass for overtaking manoeuvre improvement.
