= BMW M4 DTM =

Grand touring race car

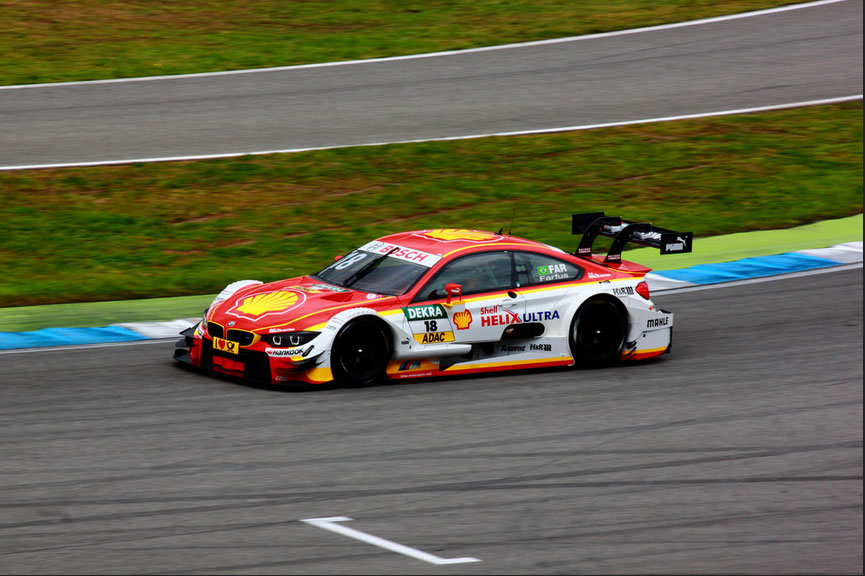
- Augusto Farfus driving a BMW M4 DTM at Hockenheimring.
- Category: Deutsche Tourenwagen Masters (Touring Cars)
- Constructor: (Germany) BMW
- Predecessor: BMW M3 DTM
- Successor: BMW M4 Turbo DTM

Technical specifications
- Chassis: Carbon-fibre monocoque
- Suspension (front): Double wishbones with H&R spring and ZF Sachs damper units to front and rear axles, actuated via pushrods
- Suspension (rear): As front
- Length: 4,775–5,010 mm (188–197 in)
- Width: 1,950 mm (77 in)
- Height: 1,200 mm (47 in)
- Axle track: 1,950 mm (77 in)
- Wheelbase: 2,750 mm (108 in)
- Engine: BMW P66 (2014-2016) later P66/1 (2017-2018) 4.0 L (244 cu in) V8 90° naturally-aspirated, front engined, longitudinally mounted
- Transmission: Hewland 6-speed sequential semi-automatic paddle shift
- Battery: Braille B128L Micro-Lite lithium racing battery 12 volts
- Power: 460 hp (343 kW) (2014-2016) later over 500 hp (373 kW) (2017-2018) @ 7,500 rpm, 500 N⋅m (370 ft⋅lbf) torque
- Weight: 1,110 kg (2,447 lb) (2014); 1,120 kg (2,469 lb) (2015-2016); 1,125 kg (2,480 lb) + BoP weight allowance of 1,095–1,140 kg (2,414–2,513 lb) (2017 - abolished since Austrian round); 1,115 kg (2,458 lb) (2018) including driver
- Fuel: Aral Ultimate unleaded 102 RON racing gasoline
- Lubricants: Castrol Edge (2014) later Shell Helix Ultra (2015-present)
- Brakes: AP Racing carbon brake discs with 6-piston calipers and pads
- Tyres: Hankook Ventus; BBS (2014-2016) later ATS (2017-present) wheels
- Clutch: ZF 4-plate carbon fibre reinforced plastic clutch

Competition history
- Notable entrants: (Belgium) Team RBM (Germany) Team Schnitzer (Germany) Team MTEK (Germany) Team RMG
- Notable drivers: (Brazil) Augusto Farfus (United States) Joey Hand (Canada) Bruno Spengler (Germany) Martin Tomczyk (Germany) Timo Glock (Portugal) António Félix da Costa (Germany) Marco Wittmann (Belgium) Maxime Martin (United Kingdom) Tom Blomqvist (Austria) Philipp Eng (Sweden) Joel Eriksson (Italy) Alessandro Zanardi
- Debut: 2014 Hockenheimring 1 Deutsche Tourenwagen Masters round
Races	Wins	Poles	F/Laps
84	22	26	18
- Constructors' Championships: 2 (2014, 2015)
- Drivers' Championships: 2 (2014, 2016)

The BMW M4 DTM is a touring car constructed by the German car manufacturer BMW for the Deutsche Tourenwagen Masters. It was developed in 2013, and partook in DTM races from 2014 to 2020. Two versions were made: a naturally-aspirated V8 car through 2018, and a turbo Class 1 version starting in 2019. The M4 DTM is based on the production model BMW M4 and replaced the BMW M3 DTM after the 2013 season.

== First generation (2014) ==
=== Debut ===
With the homologation of the M4 DTM completed on 3 March 2014, the car's race debut was at the 2014 Hockenheimring 1 Deutsche Tourenwagen Masters round on 4 May 2014. BMW Team RMG's Marco Wittmann scored his M4 DTM's first victory in their M4 debut. Two weeks later in Motorsport Arena Oschersleben, BMW Team RMG's Marco Wittmann scored his M4 DTM's first pole position after Audi's Miguel Molina was stripped of pole position.

=== Teams and drivers ===
In the 2014 DTM season lined-up eight drivers on for four teams. Augusto Farfus and Joey Hand start for BMW Team RBM. Bruno Spengler and Martin Tomczyk for BMW Team Schnitzer. Timo Glock and António Félix da Costa start for BMW Team MTEK. Marco Wittmann and Maxime Martin start for BMW Team RMG. Wittmann won the championship with four wins, and Martin won a race.

In the 2015 DTM season lined-up eight drivers on for four teams. Augusto Farfus and Tom Blomqvist start for BMW Team RBM. Bruno Spengler and Timo Glock for BMW Team Schnitzer. António Félix da Costa and Martin Tomczyk start for BMW Team MTEK. Marco Wittmann and Maxime Martin start for BMW Team RMG. Five different drivers claimed a win.

In the 2016 DTM season lined-up eight drivers on for four teams. Maxime Martin and Tom Blomqvist start for BMW Team RBM. António Félix da Costa and Timo Glock for BMW Team Schnitzer. Bruno Spengler and Augusto Farfus start for BMW Team MTEK. Marco Wittmann and Timo Glock start for BMW Team RMG. Wittmann won the championship with three wins.

In the 2017 DTM season lined-up six drivers on for two teams. Maxime Martin, Bruno Spengler and Tom Blomqvist start for BMW Team RBM while Marco Wittmann, Augusto Farfus and Timo Glock start for BMW Team RMG.

In the 2018 DTM season lined-up six drivers on for two teams. Philipp Eng, Bruno Spengler and Joel Eriksson start for BMW Team RBM while Marco Wittmann, Augusto Farfus and Timo Glock remained same for BMW Team RMG.

=== Achievements ===
As of August 2017, BMW M4 DTM scored 16 victories, 20 poles, 13 fastest laps, 1 constructor title (2015) and 2 driver titles (courtesy of Marco Wittmann in 2014 and 2016).

=== Gallery ===
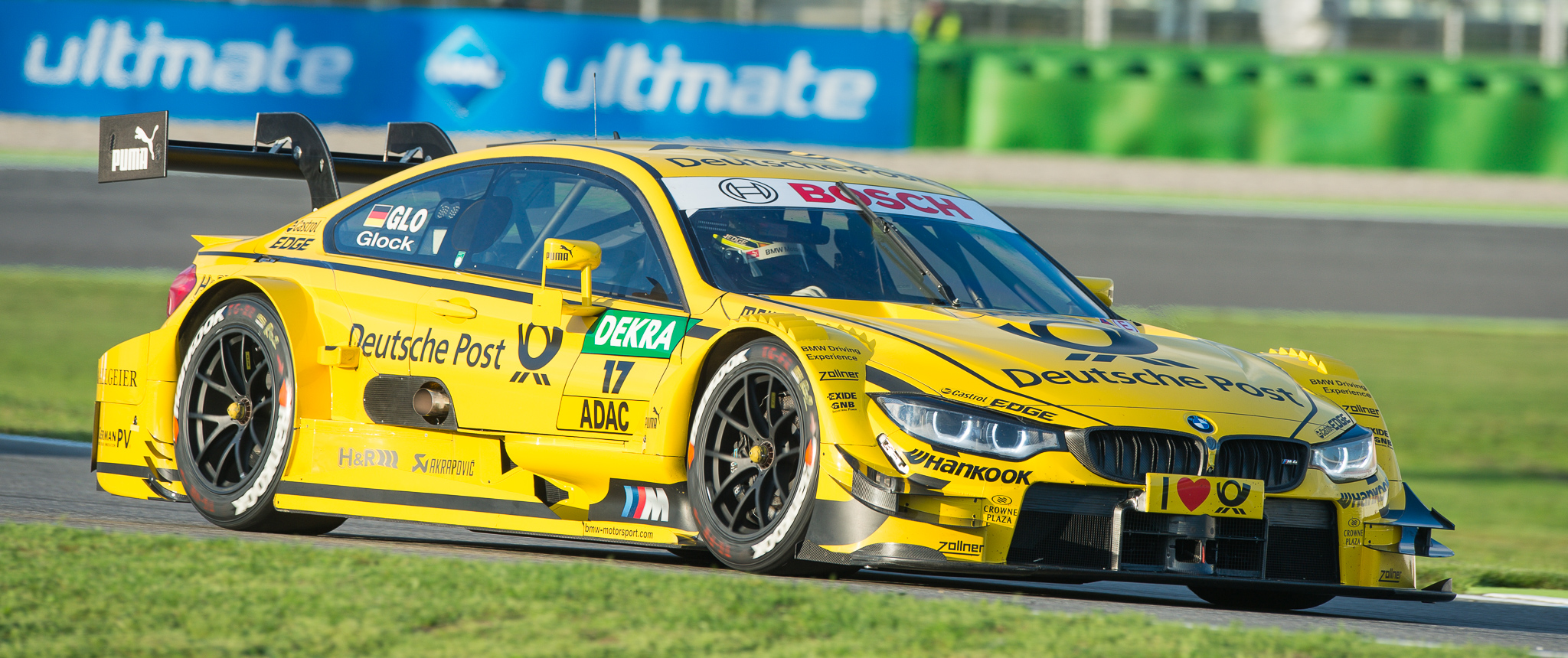
Timo Glock, Hockenheimring, 2014

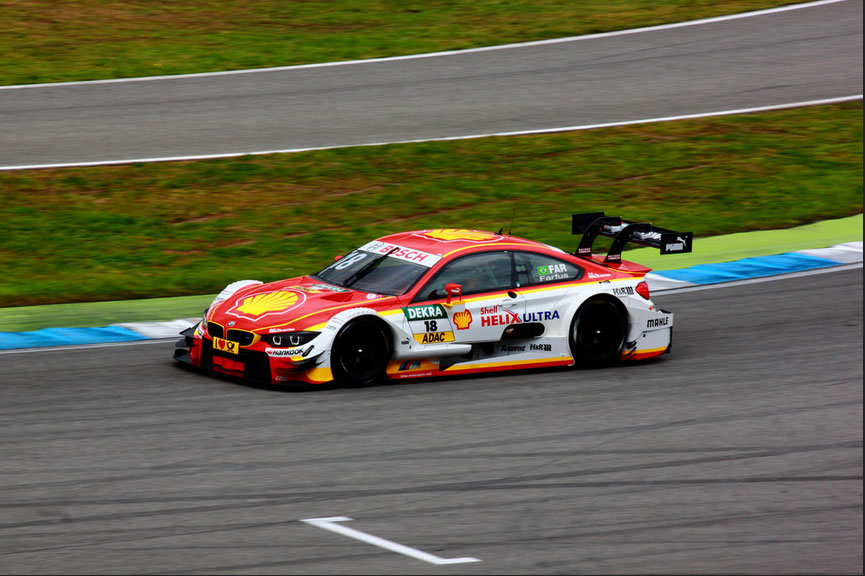
Augusto Farfus, Hockenheimring, 2015

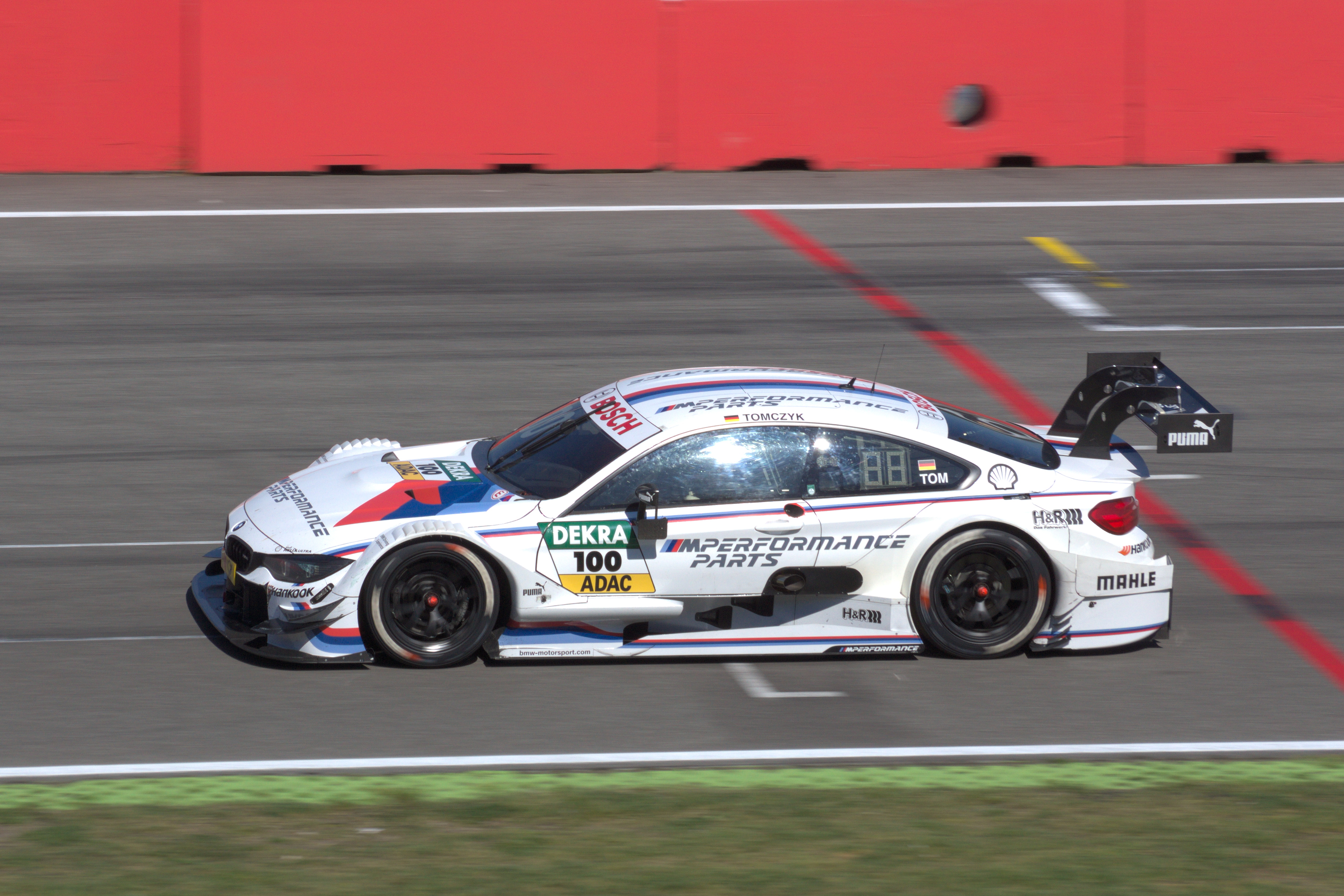
Martin Tomczyk, Hockenheimring, 2016

== Second generation (2019) ==
BMW M4 Turbo DTM
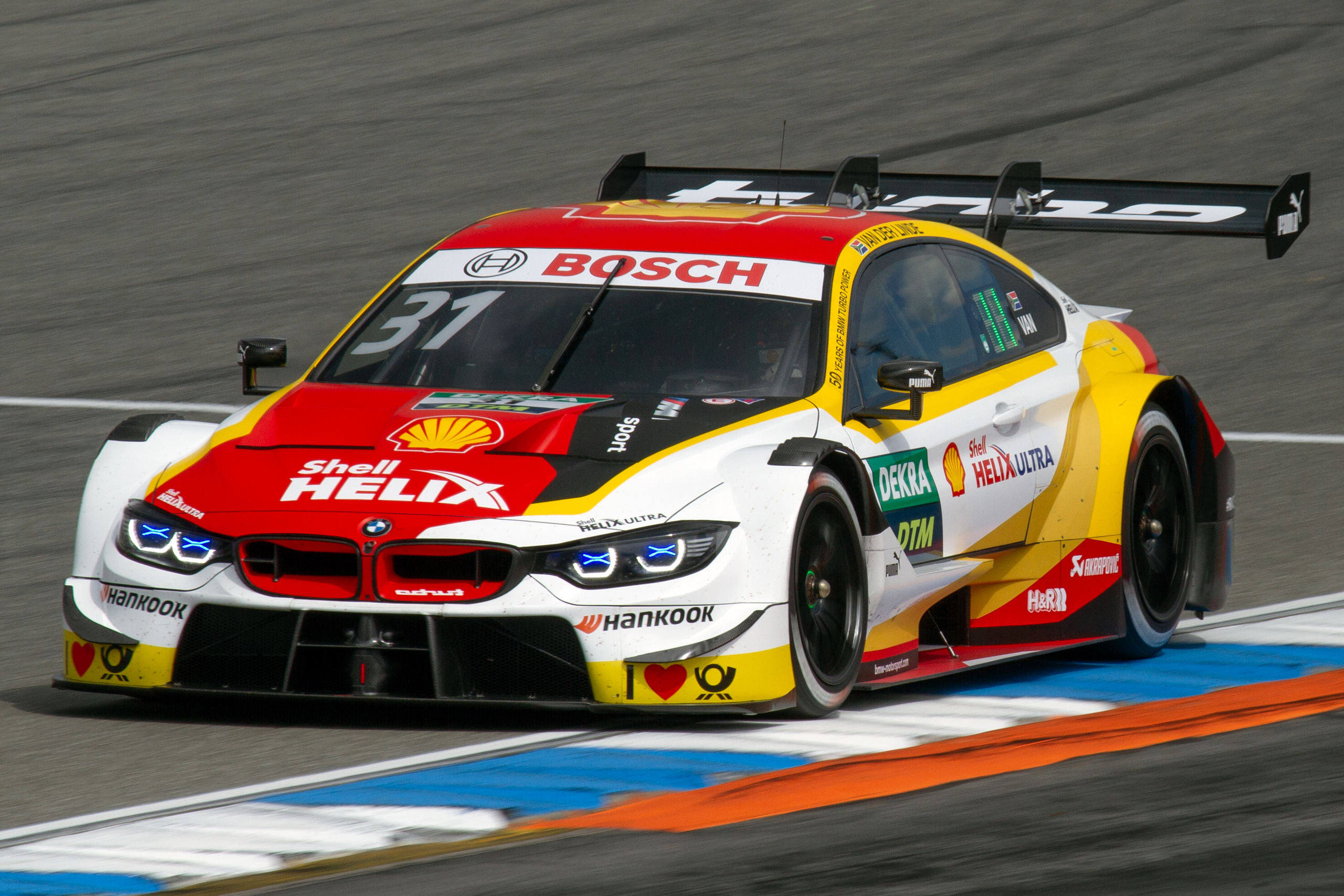
- Sheldon van der Linde driving BMW M4 DTM Turbo at the 2019 DTM Hockenheim round.
- Category: Deutsche Tourenwagen Masters (Class 1 Touring Cars) and Super GT GT500 Class 1 car
- Constructor: (Germany) BMW
- Designer: Michael Scully

Technical specifications
- Engine: BMW P48 2.0 L (122 cu in) inline-4direct-injected with 4-stroke piston Otto cycle inter-cooled with efficiency combustion process and greater emission engine burning, single-turbocharged (supplied by Garrett), front engined, longitudinally mounted
- Transmission: Hewland DTT-200 6-speed + 1 reverse sequential semi-automatic paddle shift with limited-slip differential
- Power: 610 + 30 hp (455 + 22 kW) (2019) later 580 + 60 hp (433 + 45 kW) (2020) including push-to-pass, 650 N⋅m (479 ft⋅lb) torque
- Fuel: Aral Ultimate unleaded 102 RON racing gasoline
- Lubricants: Shell Helix Ultra
- Tyres: Hankook Ventus; ATS

Competition history
- Notable entrants: (Germany) BMW Team RMG (Belgium) BMW Team RBM (Belgium) BMW Team RMR (France) BMW ORLEN Team ART Grand Prix
- Notable drivers: (Germany) Marco Wittmann (Germany) Timo Glock (Canada) Bruno Spengler (Austria) Philipp Eng (Sweden) Joel Eriksson (South Africa) Sheldon van der Linde (Italy) Alex Zanardi (Japan) Kamui Kobayashi (Austria) Lucas Auer (South Africa) Jonathan Aberdein (Poland) Robert Kubica
- Debut: 2019 DTM Hockenheim round
Races	Wins	Poles	F/Laps
38 (including Super GT × DTM Dream Race non-championship joint-event at Fuji Speedway)	8	7	8
- Constructors' Championships: 0
- Drivers' Championships: 0

The BMW M4 Turbo DTM is a "Class 1" touring car constructed by the German car manufacturer BMW for use in the Deutsche Tourenwagen Masters. It is a turbocharged variant of its predecessor, the BMW M4 DTM that had a naturally-aspirated engine. The M4 DTM Turbo is still based on the production BMW M4. The BMW M4 DTM Turbo made its DTM debut in the 2019 DTM season. The M4 DTM Turbo is the BMW's second turbo-powered DTM car.

=== Debut ===
The first shakedown run of the BMW M4 DTM Turbo was on 27 October 2018, by Bruno Spengler at BMW headquarters in Munich, Germany. The official race debut of BMW M4 DTM Turbo was at the 2019 Hockenheimring 1 DTM round on 4 May 2019. BMW Team RMG's Marco Wittmann won the inaugural pole and won the first race with the M4 DTM Turbo car.
