= Aston Martin Vantage DTM =

British touring car

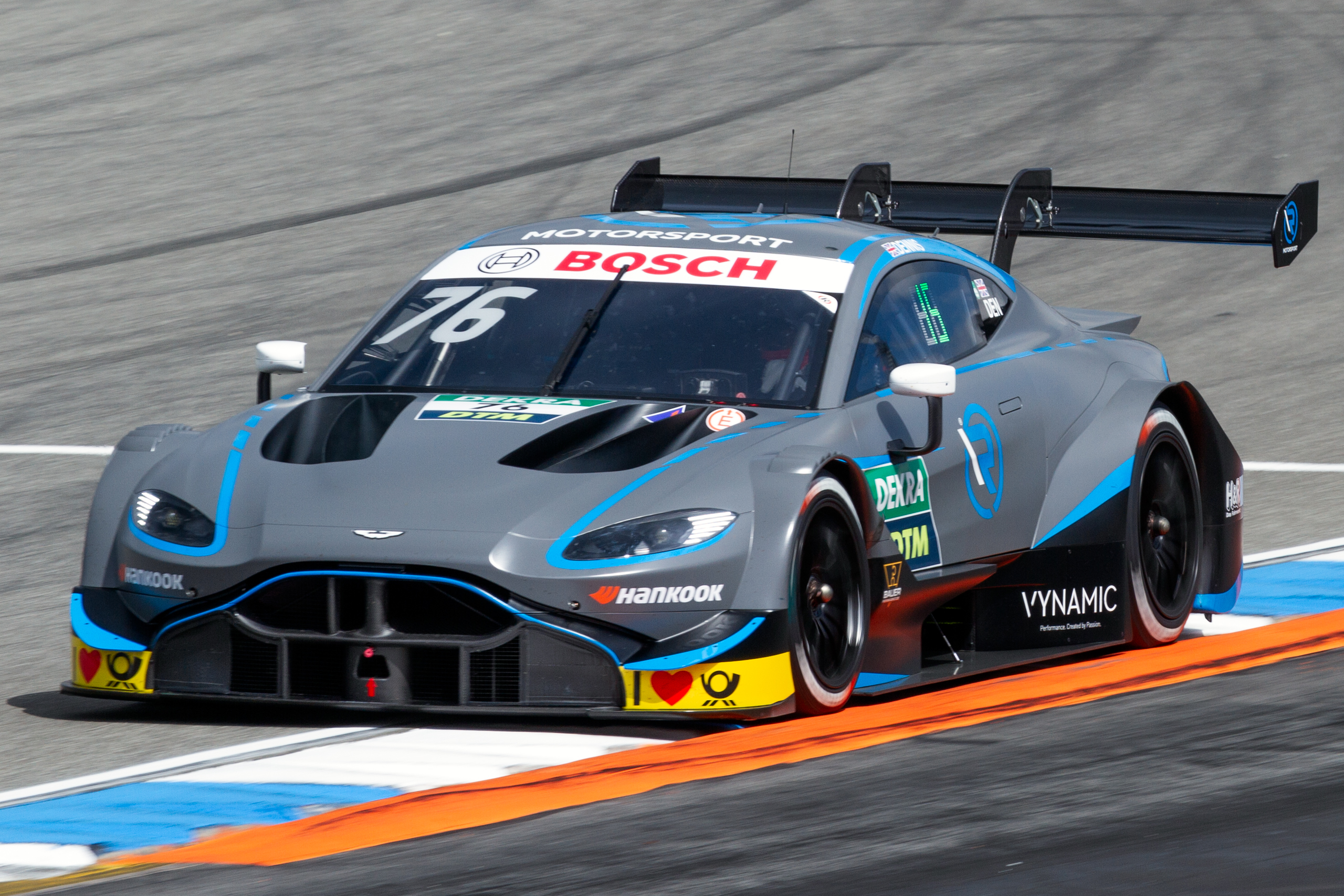
- Jake Dennis driving the Vantage DTM during practice at the Hockenheimring in 2019.
- Category: Deutsche Tourenwagen Masters (Class 1 Touring Cars)
- Constructor: Aston Martin (joint-development by HWA)
- Designer: Dan Sayers

Technical specifications
- Chassis: Carbon-fibre reinforced plastic monocoque with a steel tubing roll cage
- Suspension (front): Uniform double wishbones with by pushrod operated spring damper units at the front and rear axle
- Suspension (rear): As front
- Length: 4,730 mm (186 in) excluding rear wing; 4,958 mm (195 in) including rear wing
- Width: 1,950 mm (77 in)
- Height: 1,280 mm (50 in)
- Axle track: 1,950 mm (77 in)
- Wheelbase: 2,750 mm (108 in)
- Engine: HWA AFR Turbo (2019) 2.0 L (122 cu in) inline-4 direct-injected with 4-stroke piston Otto cycle inter-cooled with efficiency combustion process and greater emission engine burning, single-turbocharged (supplied by Garrett), front engined, longitudinally mounted
- Transmission: Hewland DTT-200 6-speed + 1 reverse sequential semi-automatic paddle shift with limited-slip differential
- Battery: Braille B128L Micro-Lite lithium racing battery 12 volts
- Power: 610 + 30 hp (455 + 22 kW) (2019), 650 N⋅m (479 ft⋅lb) torque
- Weight: 986 + 84 kg (2,174 + 185 lb) including driver and fuel (1,070 kg (2,359 lb) of total weight)
- Fuel: Aral Ultimate unleaded 102 RON racing gasoline
- Lubricants: Total Quartz 9000
- Brakes: AP Racing carbon brake discs with 6-piston calipers and pads
- Tyres: Hankook Ventus; ATS (2019)
- Clutch: ZF 4-plate carbon fibre reinforced plastic clutch

Competition history
- Notable entrants: (Switzerland) R-Motorsport
- Notable drivers: (United Kingdom) Paul di Resta (Spain) Daniel Juncadella (Austria) Ferdinand Habsburg (United Kingdom) Jake Dennis
- Debut: 2019 DTM Hockenheim round
Races	Wins	Poles	F/Laps
18	0	0	0
- Constructors' Championships: 0
- Drivers' Championships: 0

The Aston Martin Vantage DTM is a "Class 1" touring car constructed by the British car manufacturer Aston Martin for use in the Deutsche Tourenwagen Masters. The Vantage DTM was the first Aston Martin DTM car since its entry to the sport from the 2019 season with the joint-development by HWA. The Aston Martin Vantage DTM made its DTM debut in the 2019 DTM season under Class 1 regulations.

== Development ==
HWA AG began development, design and construction of the Vantage DTM chassis in October 2018. The first Vantage DTM chassis was assembled in February 2019, with the first vehicle completed in early-March. Built by HWA AG in Affalterbach, Germany; the completed Vantage DTM was revealed at Circuito de Jerez on 4 March 2019.

== Debut ==
The Vantage DTM made its official test début at EuroSpeedway Lausitz on 14 April 2019 and made its race début at Hockenheimring on 3 May 2019. The car lasted only one season in the sport, finishing last in the manufacturer's standings, before withdrawing at the end of the season citing cost concerns; the Vantage also did not participate in the non-championship race at Fuji Speedway against Super GT cars.
