= 2005 Monaco Porsche Supercup round =

- Race 3 of 11 in the 2005 Porsche Supercup

Race details
- Date: 21 May 2005
- Location: Circuit de Monaco, Monte Carlo, Monaco
- Course: Street circuit
- Course length: 3.340 km (2.075 miles)
- Distance: 16 laps, 53.44 km ( miles)

Pole position
Driver	(Netherlands) Patrick Huisman	Lechner School Racing Team 1
- Time: 1:37.012

Fastest lap
Driver	(Belgium) David Saelens	Pro Futura Racing Team Kadach
- Time: 1:38.034

Podium
First	(Netherlands) Patrick Huisman	Lechner School Racing Team 1
Second	(Monaco) Stéphane Ortelli	Porsche AG
Third	(Italy) Alessandro Zampedri	Lechner School Racing Team 1

The 2005 Monaco Porsche Supercup round was a Porsche Supercup motor race held on 21 May 2005 at the Circuit de Monaco in Monte Carlo, Monaco. It was the threth race of the 2005 Porsche Supercup. The race was used to support the 2005 Monaco Grand Prix.

== Results ==
=== Qualifying ===
Pos.	No.	Driver	Team	Time	Gap	Grid
1	4	(Netherlands) Patrick Huisman	Lechner School Racing Team 1	1:37.012		1
2	1	(Monaco) Stéphane Ortelli	Porsche AG	1:37.287	+0.275	2
3	3	(Italy) Alessandro Zampedri	Lechner School Racing Team 1	1:37.451	+0.439	3
4	7	(Belgium) David Saelens	Pro Futura Racing Team Kadach	1:37.546	+0.534	4
5	23	(United Kingdom) Richard Westbrook	Lechner School Racing Team 1	1:37.592	+0.580	5
6	46	(Austria) Richard Lietz	Tolimit Motorsport	1:38.217	+1.205	6
7	39	(Germany) Christian Menzel	Tolimit Motorsport	1:38.350	+1.338	7
8	9	(Germany) Tim Bergmeister	Pro Futura Racing Team Kadach	1:38.544	+1.532	8
9	11	(Switzerland) Philip Beyrer	Jetstream Motorsport PZ Essen	1:39.205	+2.193	9
10	8	(France) Fabrice Walfisch	Pro Futura Racing Team Kadach	1:39.391	+2.379	10
11	5	(Belgium) Geoffroy Horion	Lechner School Racing Team 2	1:39.642	+2.630	11
12	10	(Netherlands) Simon Frederiks	Jetstream Motorsport PZ Essen	1:40.329	+3.317	12
13	38	(United States) Tomy Drissi	Tolimit Motorsport	1:40.472	+3.460	13
14	2	(Hong Kong) Matthew Marsh	Porsche AG	1:40.920	+3.908	14
15	6	(Belgium) David Dermont	Lechner School Racing Team 2	1:41.643	+4.631	15
16	17	(Germany) Thomas Messer	Vertu Racing PZ Hofheim	1:41.828	+4.816	16
17	16	(Germany) Oliver Mayer	Vertu Racing PZ Hofheim	1:42.456	+5.444	17
18	15	(Germany) Matthias Weiland	Vertu Racing PZ Hofheim	1:44.027	+7.015	18
Lähde:

=== Race ===
Pos	No	Driver	Team	Laps	Time/Retired	Grid
1	4	(Netherlands) Patrick Huisman	Lechner School Racing Team 1	16	26:29.214	1
2	1	(Monaco) Stéphane Ortelli	Porsche AG	16	+4.360	2
3	3	(Italy) Alessandro Zampedri	Lechner School Racing Team 1	16	+6.142	3
4	23	(United Kingdom) Richard Westbrook	Lechner School Racing Team 1	16	+6.994	4
5	46	(Austria) Richard Lietz	Tolimit Motorsport	16	+18.435	6
6	7	(Belgium) David Saelens	Pro Futura Racing Team Kadach	16	+22.594	4
7	8	(France) Fabrice Walfisch	Pro Futura Racing Team Kadach	16	+22.895	10
8	39	(Germany) Christian Menzel	Tolimit Motorsport	16	+23.405	7
9	9	(Germany) Tim Bergmeister	Pro Futura Racing Team Kadach	16	+24.084	8
10	5	(Belgium) Geoffroy Horion	Lechner School Racing Team 2	16	+26.279	11
11	10	(Netherlands) Simon Frederiks	Jetstream Motorsport PZ Essen	16	+54.844	12
12	17	(Germany) Thomas Messer	Vertu Racing PZ Hofheim	16	+55.741	16
13	38	(United States) Tomy Drissi	Tolimit Motorsport	16	+1:02.593	13
14	2	(Hong Kong) Matthew Marsh	Porsche AG	16	+1:06.147	14
15	6	(Belgium) David Dermont	Lechner School Racing Team 2	16	+1:08.172	15
16	11	(Switzerland) Philip Beyrer	Jetstream Motorsport PZ Essen	15	+1 lap	9
17	15	(Germany) Matthias Weiland	Vertu Racing PZ Hofheim	15	+1 lap	18
18	16	(Germany) Oliver Mayer	Vertu Racing PZ Hofheim	15	+1 lap	17
Lähde:

== Standings after the round ==
Drivers' Championship standings

	Pos	Driver	Points
	1	(Netherlands) Patrick Huisman	56
	2	(United Kingdom) Richard Westbrook	48
1	3	(Italy) Alessandro Zampedri	47
1	4	(Belgium) David Saelens	44
2	5	(Austria) Richard Lietz	35

Teams' Championship standings

Pos	Team	Points
1	(Austria) Lechner School Racing Team 1	103
2	(Austria) Lechner School Racing Team 2	80
3	(Germany) Pro Futura Racing Team Kadach	69
4	(Germany) Tolimit Motorsport	69
5	(Netherlands) Jetstream Motorsport PZ Essen	33

- Note: Only the top five positions are included for both sets of standings.

== See also ==
- 2005 Monaco Grand Prix
- 2005 Monaco GP2 Series round
- 2005 Monaco Grand Prix Formula Three

Previous round: 2005 Catalunya Porsche Supercup round	Porsche Supercup; 2005 season	Next round: 2005 Nürburgring Porsche Supercup round
Previous round: 2004 Monaco Porsche Supercup round	Monaco Porsche Supercup round	Next round: 2006 Monaco Porsche Supercup round
