= 2005 Magny-Cours Porsche Supercup round =

- Race 6 of 11 in the 2005 Porsche Supercup

Race details
- Date: 3 July 2005
- Location: Circuit de Nevers Magny-Cours, Magny-Cours, France
- Course: Permanent racing facility
- Course length: 4.411 km (2.741 miles)
- Distance: 14 laps, 61.57 km ( miles)

Pole position
Driver	(Belgium) David Saelens	Pro Futura Racing Team Kadach
- Time: 1:42.901

Fastest lap
Driver	(Austria) Richard Lietz	Tolimit Motorsport
- Time: 1:46.085

Podium
First	(Austria) Richard Lietz	Tolimit Motorsport
Second	(Germany) Uwe Alzen	Konrad Motorsport-PZ Bielefeld
Third	(France) Fabrice Walfisch	Pro Futura Racing Team Kadach

The 2005 Magny-Cours Porsche Supercup round was a Porsche Supercup motor race held on 3 July 2005 at the Circuit de Nevers Magny-Cours in Magny-Cours, France. It was the sixth race of the 2005 Porsche Supercup. The race was used to support the 2005 French Grand Prix.

== Results ==
=== Qualifying ===
Pos.	No.	Driver	Team	Time	Gap	Grid
1	7	(Belgium) David Saelens	Pro Futura Racing Team Kadach	1:42.901		1
2	46	(Austria) Richard Lietz	Tolimit Motorsport	1:42.985	+0.084	2
3	4	(Netherlands) Patrick Huisman	Lechner School Racing Team 1	1:43.101	+0.200	3
4	39	(Germany) Christian Menzel	Tolimit Motorsport	1:43.333	+0.432	4
5	8	(France) Fabrice Walfisch	Pro Futura Racing Team Kadach	1:43.455	+0.554	5
6	3	(Italy) Alessandro Zampedri	Lechner School Racing Team 1	1:43.516	+0.615	6
7	21	(Germany) Uwe Alzen	Konrad Motorsport-PZ Bielefeld	1:43.534	+0.633	7
8	5	(Belgium) Geoffroy Horion	Lechner School Racing Team 2	1:43.700	+0.799	8
9	9	(Germany) Tim Bergmeister	Pro Futura Racing Team Kadach	1:43.733	+0.832	9
10	11	(Switzerland) Philip Beyrer	Jetstream Motorsport PZ Essen	1:44.392	+1.491	10
11	30	(Netherlands) Duncan Huisman	MRS PC-Service-Team	1:44.889	+1.988	11
12	6	(Belgium) David Dermont	Lechner School Racing Team 2	1:45.634	+2.733	12
13	16	(Germany) Oliver Mayer	Vertu Racing PZ Hofheim	1:46.253	+3.352	13
14	10	(Netherlands) Simon Frederiks	Jetstream Motorsport PZ Essen	1:46.503	+3.602	14
15	22	(Germany) Klaus Abbelen	Konrad Motorsport-PZ Bielefeld	1:47.164	+4.263	15
16	15	(Germany) Matthias Weiland	Vertu Racing PZ Hofheim	1:48.069	+5.168	16
Lähde:

=== Race ===
Pos	No	Driver	Team	Laps	Time/Retired	Grid	Points
1	46	(Austria) Richard Lietz	Tolimit Motorsport	14	24:58.386	2	20
2	21	(Germany) Uwe Alzen	Konrad Motorsport-PZ Bielefeld	14	+3.852	7	18
3	8	(France) Fabrice Walfisch	Pro Futura Racing Team Kadach	14	+5.902	5	16
4	39	(Germany) Christian Menzel	Tolimit Motorsport	14	+8.561	4	14
5	7	(Belgium) David Saelens	Pro Futura Racing Team Kadach	14	+12.122	1	12
6	3	(Italy) Alessandro Zampedri	Lechner School Racing Team 1	14	+14.298	6	10
7	11	(Switzerland) Philip Beyrer	Jetstream Motorsport PZ Essen	14	+16.699	10	9
8	9	(Germany) Tim Bergmeister	Pro Futura Racing Team Kadach	14	+17.611	9	8
9	30	(Netherlands) Duncan Huisman	MRS PC-Service-Team	14	+23.534	11	7
10	5	(Belgium) Geoffroy Horion	Lechner School Racing Team 2	14	+29.035	8	6
11	10	(Netherlands) Simon Frederiks	Jetstream Motorsport PZ Essen	14	+42.171	14	5
12	6	(Belgium) David Dermont	Lechner School Racing Team 2	14	+50.662	12	4
13	16	(Germany) Oliver Mayer	Vertu Racing PZ Hofheim	14	+51.438	13	3
14	15	(Germany) Matthias Weiland	Vertu Racing PZ Hofheim	14	+1:09.980	16	2
Ret	22	(Germany) Klaus Abbelen	Konrad Motorsport-PZ Bielefeld	4	Gearbox	15	
Ret	4	(Netherlands) Patrick Huisman	Lechner School Racing Team 1	3	Fuel system	3	
Lähde:

== Standings after the round ==
Drivers' Championship standings

	Pos	Driver	Points
	1	(Italy) Alessandro Zampedri	111
	2	(Belgium) David Saelens	104
1	3	(Germany) Christian Menzel	89
1	4	(Netherlands) Patrick Huisman	86
1	5	(Austria) Richard Lietz	86

Teams' Championship standings

Pos	Team	Points
1	(Austria) Lechner School Racing Team 1	201
2	(Germany) Tolimit Motorsport	179
3	(Germany) Pro Futura Racing Team Kadach	160
4	(Austria) Lechner School Racing Team 2	130
5	(Netherlands) Jetstream Motorsport PZ Essen	99

- Note: Only the top five positions are included for both sets of standings.

== See also ==
- 2005 French Grand Prix
- 2005 Magny-Cours GP2 Series round

Previous round: 2005 Indianapolis Porsche Supercup round	Porsche Supercup; 2005 season	Next round: 2005 Silverstone Porsche Supercup round
Previous round: 2004 Magny-Cours Porsche Supercup round	Magny-Cours Porsche Supercup round	Next round: 2006 Magny-Cours Porsche Supercup round
