= 2008 Porsche Supercup =

16th Porsche Supercup season

The 2008 Porsche Mobil 1 Supercup season was the 16th Porsche Supercup season. The races were all supporting races in the 2008 Formula One season. It travelled to ten circuits across Europe and also a double-header in Bahrain.

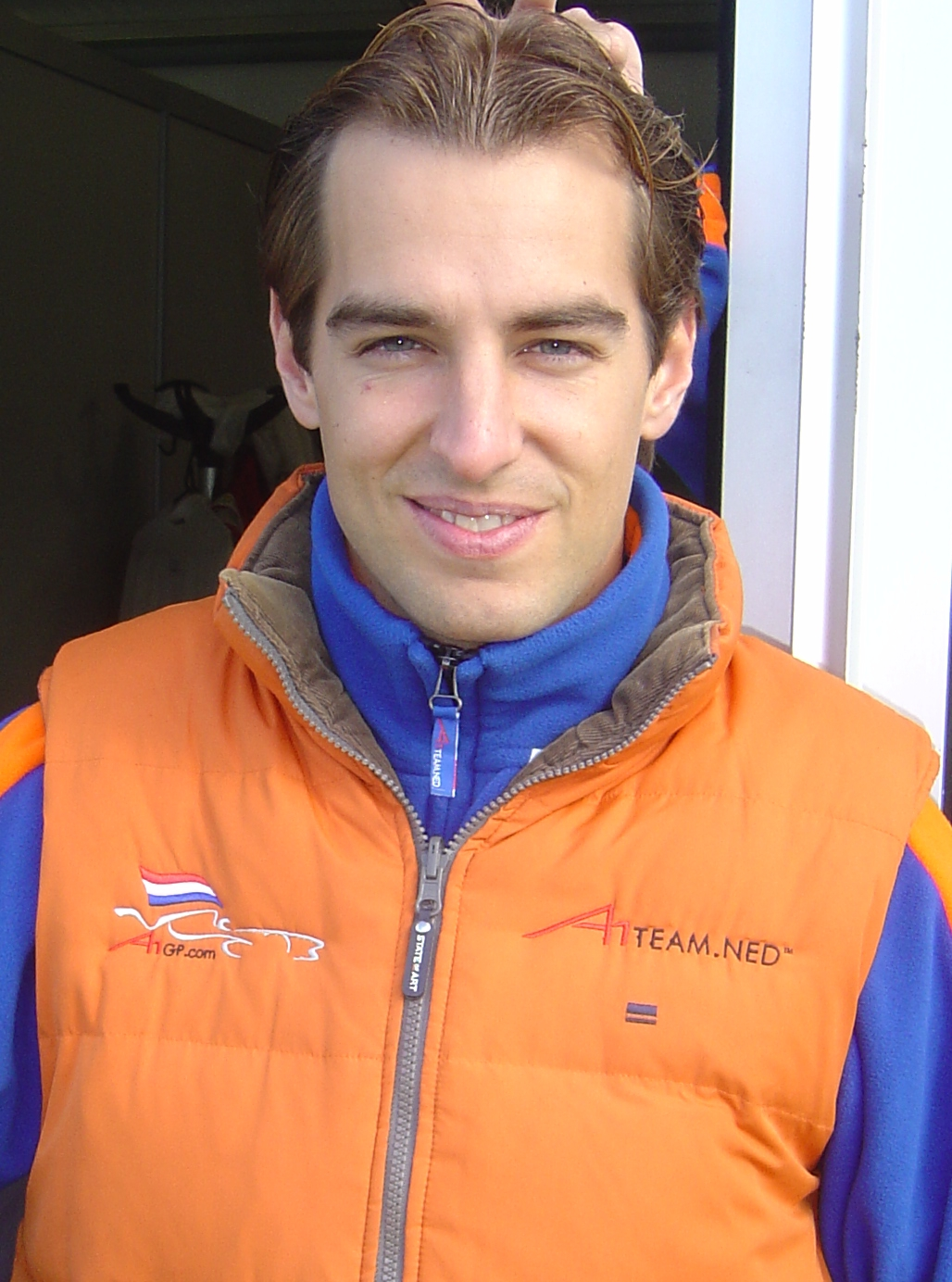
Jeroen Bleekemolen (pictured in 2007) won the Drivers' Championship title

== Teams and drivers ==
Team	No.	Drivers	Rounds
(Austria) Lechner Racing Bahrain	1	(Italy) Alessandro Zampedri	1–3, 5–11
(Austria) Lechner Racing Bahrain	2	(Slovakia) Štefan Rosina	All
(Germany) Tolimit	3	(France) Nicolas Armindo	1–8
(Germany) Tolimit	3	(Germany) Jan Seyffarth	9–11
(Germany) Tolimit	4	(Sweden) Jocke Mangs	1–9
(Germany) Tolimit	4	(Republic of Ireland) Robert Cregan	10–11
(Germany) Tolimit	31	(United Kingdom) Sam Hancock	5
(Germany) SPS Automotive	5	(Germany) Uwe Alzen	1–5
(Germany) SPS Automotive	5	(Switzerland) Marc Benz	6–11
(Germany) SPS Automotive	6	(Switzerland) Marc Benz	4
(Germany) SPS Automotive	6	(Lithuania) Nemunas Dagilis	1–3, 5–6
(Germany) SPS Automotive	6	(Germany) Lance David Arnold	7–11
(Netherlands) Bleekemolen Race Planet	7	(Netherlands) Sebastiaan Bleekemolen	All
(Netherlands) Bleekemolen Race Planet	8	(Netherlands) Tim Buijs	All
(Netherlands) Jetstream Motorsport	9	(Spain) Lucas Guerrero	1–9
(Netherlands) Jetstream Motorsport	9	(United Kingdom) Richard Williams	10
(Netherlands) Jetstream Motorsport	9	(Sweden) Alx Danielsson	11
(Netherlands) Jetstream Motorsport	10	(Netherlands) Jeroen Bleekemolen	All
(Netherlands) Racing Team Jetstream	11	(Portugal) Pedro Petiz	All
(Netherlands) Racing Team Jetstream	12	(Spain) Alejandro Núñez	1
(Netherlands) Racing Team Jetstream	12	(Netherlands) Mike Verschuur	2–3
(Netherlands) Racing Team Jetstream	12	(Netherlands) Michael Bleekemolen	4, 8–11
(Netherlands) Racing Team Jetstream	12	(United Kingdom) Phil Quaife	5
(Netherlands) Racing Team Jetstream	12	(United Kingdom) James Pickford	6
(Netherlands) Racing Team Jetstream	12	(Finland) Mikael Forsten	7
(Germany) Veltins MRS Racing	14	(Germany) René Rast	1–5, 7–11
(Germany) Veltins MRS Racing	14	(United Kingdom) James Sutton	6
(Germany) Veltins MRS Racing	15	(Austria) Norbert Siedler	All
(Germany) Veltins MRS Racing	33	(United States) Will Langhorne	7–11
(Germany) Schnabl Engineering	16	(Hong Kong) Darryl O'Young	1–4, 6, 8–11
(Germany) Schnabl Engineering	16	(Japan) Keita Sawa	5, 7
(Germany) Schnabl Engineering	17	(Czech Republic) Jiří Janák	1–7
(Germany) Schnabl Engineering	17	(Germany) Jörg Hardt	8–11
(Netherlands) HSF Porsche Eindhoven	18	(Netherlands) Simon Frederiks	1–9, 11
(Netherlands) HSF Porsche Eindhoven	18	(Netherlands) Gosse Stielstra	10
(Netherlands) HSF Porsche Eindhoven	19	(Netherlands) Paul van Splunteren	1–7, 9–11
(Netherlands) HSF Porsche Eindhoven	19	(Netherlands) Mike Verschuur	8
(Austria) SAS Lechner Racing	20	(Republic of Ireland) Damien Faulkner	All
(Austria) SAS Lechner Racing	21	(United Kingdom) Danny Watts	All
(Austria) Konrad Motorsport	22	(United Kingdom) Sean Edwards	All
(Austria) Konrad Motorsport	23	(Germany) Jan Seyffarth	1–8
(Austria) Konrad Motorsport	23	(Czech Republic) Jiří Janák	9–10
(Austria) Konrad Motorsport	23	(France) Nicolas Armindo	11
(Germany) DAMAC Kadach Racing	24	(Germany) Christian Mamerow	All
(Germany) DAMAC Kadach Racing	25	(Netherlands) Jaap van Lagen	All
(United Kingdom) IRWIN Racing	26	(Belgium) David Saelens	All
(United Kingdom) IRWIN Racing	27	(Netherlands) Patrick Huisman	All
(Germany) UPS Porsche Junior Team	28	(Austria) Martin Ragginger	2, 6–8, 10–11
(Germany) UPS Porsche Junior Team	29	(Germany) Marco Holzer	2, 6–8, 10–11
(United Kingdom) Porsche Cars Great Britain	31	(United Kingdom) Sam Hancock	6
(United Kingdom) Porsche Cars Great Britain	32	(United Kingdom) Tim Harvey	6
(Italy) Centro Porsche Padova	34	(Italy) Andrea Boldrini	10
(Italy) Centro Porsche Padova	35	(Italy) Stefano Comandini	10
(Germany) Porsche AG	40	(Portugal) António Coimbra	2
(Germany) Porsche AG	40	(Switzerland) Neel Jani	7
(Germany) Porsche AG	40	(Germany) Albert von Thurn and Taxis	11

== Race calendar and results ==
Round		Circuit	Country	Date	Pole position	Fastest lap	Winning driver	Winning team
1	R1	Bahrain International Circuit	Bahrain	5 April	(Germany) René Rast	(Belgium) David Saelens	(Republic of Ireland) Damien Faulkner	(Austria) Walter Lechner Racing
1	R2	Bahrain International Circuit	Bahrain	6 April	(Germany) René Rast	(Germany) Christian Mamerow	(Germany) Christian Mamerow	(Germany) DAMAC Kadach Racing
2	R	(Spain) Circuit de Catalunya	Spain	27 April	(Germany) Jan Seyffarth	(Netherlands) Jeroen Bleekemolen	(Germany) Jan Seyffarth	(Austria) Konrad Motorsport
3	R	(Turkey) Istanbul Park	Turkey	11 May	(Germany) Christian Mamerow	(Netherlands) Jaap van Lagen	(Netherlands) Jaap van Lagen	(Germany) DAMAC Kadach Racing
4	R	Circuit de Monaco	Monaco	25 May	(Netherlands) Jeroen Bleekemolen	(Netherlands) Patrick Huisman	(Netherlands) Jeroen Bleekemolen	(Netherlands) Jetstream Motorsport
5	R	(France) Circuit de Nevers Magny-Cours	France	22 June	(France) Nicolas Armindo	(Germany) René Rast	(Netherlands) Jeroen Bleekemolen	(Netherlands) Jetstream Motorsport
6	R	(United Kingdom) Silverstone Circuit	United Kingdom	6 July	(Netherlands) Jeroen Bleekemolen	(United Kingdom) Sean Edwards	(United Kingdom) Sean Edwards	(Austria) Konrad Motorsport
7	R	(Germany) Hockenheimring	Germany	20 July	(Netherlands) Jaap van Lagen	(Netherlands) Jaap van Lagen	(Germany) Christian Mamerow	(Germany) DAMAC Kadach Racing
8	R	(Hungary) Hungaroring	Hungary	3 August	(Republic of Ireland) Damien Faulkner	(Republic of Ireland) Damien Faulkner	(Republic of Ireland) Damien Faulkner	(Austria) Walter Lechner Racing
9	R	(Spain) Valencia Street Circuit	Spain	24 August	(Netherlands) Jeroen Bleekemolen	(Germany) Jörg Hardt	(Netherlands) Jeroen Bleekemolen	(Netherlands) Jetstream Motorsport
10	R	(Belgium) Circuit de Spa-Francorchamps	Belgium	7 September	(Germany) René Rast	(Netherlands) Jaap van Lagen	(United Kingdom) Sean Edwards	(Austria) Konrad Motorsport
11	R	(Italy) Autodromo Nazionale Monza	Italy	14 September	(Germany) René Rast	(Germany) Jan Seyffarth	(France) Nicolas Armindo	(Austria) Konrad Motorsport

== Championship standings ==
Position	1st	2nd	3rd	4th	5th	6th	7th	8th	9th	10th	11th	12th	13th	14th	15th	Pole	Ref
Points	20	18	16	14	12	10	9	8	7	6	5	4	3	2	1	2	

Pos	Driver	BHR (Bahrain)		CAT (Spain)	IST (Turkey)	MON (Monaco)	MAG (France)	SIL (United Kingdom)	HOC (Germany)	HUN (Hungary)	VAL (Spain)	SPA (Belgium)	MZA (Italy)	Points
1	(Netherlands) Jeroen Bleekemolen	2	2	2	Ret	1	1	14	3	2	1	3	3	192
2	(Republic of Ireland) Damien Faulkner	1	10	9	5	2	Ret	Ret	4	1	3	25†	12	121
3	(Germany) Christian Mamerow	4	1	Ret	3	9	7	Ret	1	10	5	Ret	30†	100
4	(Netherlands) Patrick Huisman	7	13	8	9	6	4	Ret	9	3	7	5	17	98
5	(United Kingdom) Sean Edwards	13	11	12	Ret	3	13	1	10	Ret	12	1	6	96
6	(Germany) René Rast	Ret	3	5	Ret	7	Ret		5	8	6	7	9	95
7	(Netherlands) Jaap van Lagen	10	Ret	11	1	12	2	Ret	2	Ret	Ret	2	19	94
8	(Germany) Jan Seyffarth	3	5	1	2	8	8	Ret	16	17	16	10	29†	93
9	(United Kingdom) Danny Watts	6	7	6	7	19	5	2	27	4	21†	26†	10	91
10	(Slovakia) Štefan Rosina	23†	12	7	17	10	3	3	15	Ret	4	9	4	89
11	(France) Nicolas Armindo	18	6	4	Ret	18	9	15	6	16			1	73
12	(Belgium) David Saelens	5	9	26	6	5	Ret	Ret^{1}	8	5	Ret	6	20	73
13	(Germany) Uwe Alzen	8	4	10	4	4	6							67
14	(Germany) Jörg Hardt									9	2	11	2	49
15	(Italy) Alessandro Zampedri	11	15	Ret	11	DNS	12	9	Ret	12	20†	13	8	48
16	(Netherlands) Sebastiaan Bleekemolen	12	8	13	10	17	20	5	18	14	Ret	17	25	44
17	(Austria) Norbert Siedler	17	Ret	DNS	Ret	16	10	8	26	24	10	4	11	39
18	(Czech Republic) Jiří Janák	9	DNS	14	12	13	Ret	Ret	11		13	8		36
19	(Portugal) Pedro Petiz	24†	14	20	Ret	Ret	Ret	Ret	12	13	8	24	5	32
20	(Sweden) Jocke Mangs	19	Ret	16	Ret	21	Ret	11	14	15	11			22
21	(Spain) Lucas Guerrero	16	Ret	19	13	14	15	18	20	19	9			21
22	(Germany) Lance David Arnold								13	7	14	Ret	7	16
23	(Netherlands) Tim Buijs	21	19	21	Ret	DNQ	17	13	19	22	Ret	Ret	14	15
24	(Switzerland) Marc Benz					11		12	17	Ret	15	14	23	12
25	(Netherlands) Paul van Splunteren	14	17	22	14	22	18	Ret	23		Ret	21	26	8
26	(Netherlands) Simon Frederiks	20	18	23	16	23	19	16	24	21	19		28	7
27	(Lithuania) Nemunas Dagilis	22	20	25	15		21	17						5
28	(Hong Kong) Darryl O'Young	Ret	16	18	18	15		Ret		23	17	20	27	4
29	(Netherlands) Michael Bleekemolen					20				20	18	20	15	3
30	(Spain) Alejandro Núñez	15	DNS											1
guest drivers ineligible for championship points
–	(Austria) Martin Ragginger			3				Ret	7	Ret		Ret	22	0
–	(United Kingdom) James Sutton							4						0
–	(Germany) Marco Holzer			15				6	Ret	6		12	21	0
–	(United Kingdom) Sam Hancock						16	7						0
–	(United Kingdom) Tim Harvey							10						0
–	(United Kingdom) Phil Quaife						11							0
–	(Netherlands) Mike Verschuur			17						11				0
–	(Japan) Keita Sawa						14		22					0
–	(United Kingdom) Richard Williams											15		0
–	(United States) Will Langhorne								21	18	Ret	16	13	0
–	(Republic of Ireland) Robert Cregan											18	16	0
–	(Germany) Albert von Thurn and Taxis												18	0
–	(Italy) Stefano Comandini											19		0
–	(Netherlands) Gosse Stielstra											23		0
–	(Portugal) António Coimbra			24										0
–	(Sweden) Alx Danielsson												24	0
–	(Finland) Mikael Forsten								25					0
–	(United Kingdom) James Pickford							Ret						0
–	(Switzerland) Neel Jani								Ret					0
–	(Italy) Andrea Boldrini											Ret		0
Pos	Driver	BHR (Bahrain)		CAT (Spain)	IST (Turkey)	MON (Monaco)	MAG (France)	SIL (United Kingdom)	HOC (Germany)	HUN (Hungary)	VAL (Spain)	SPA (Belgium)	MZA (Italy)	Points

† — Drivers did not finish the race, but were classified as they completed over 90% of the race distance.

1. – David Saelens scored a point despite not finishing the race.
