= 2005 Porsche Supercup =

13th Porsche Supercup season

The 2005 Porsche Michelin Supercup season was the 13th Porsche Supercup season. The races were all supporting races in the 2005 Formula One season. It travelled to ten circuits across Europe, to Bahrain and a double-header at Indianapolis, US.

== Teams and drivers ==
Team	No.	Drivers	Rounds
(Germany) Porsche AG	1	(Bahrain) Salman Al Khalifa	*
(Germany) Porsche AG	1	(Italy) Luca Riccitelli	1
(Germany) Porsche AG	1	(Portugal) Pedro Couceiro	2
(Germany) Porsche AG	1	(Monaco) Stéphane Ortelli	3
(Germany) Porsche AG	1	(Switzerland) Marc Surer	4
(Germany) Porsche AG	1	(United States) Travis Pastrana	5
(Germany) Porsche AG	1	(New Zealand) Fabian Coulthard	7
(Germany) Porsche AG	1	(Germany) Olaf Manthey	8
(Germany) Porsche AG	1	(Hungary) László "Fing szex" Palik	9
(Germany) Porsche AG	1	(Italy) Stefano Comandini	10
(Germany) Porsche AG	1	(Belgium) Stéphane Lémeret	11
(Germany) Porsche AG	2	(Bahrain) Jaber Al Khalifa	*
(Germany) Porsche AG	2	(Switzerland) Gabriele Gardel	1
(Germany) Porsche AG	2	(Spain) Ignacio Gabari	2
(Germany) Porsche AG	2	(Hong Kong) Matthew Marsh	3
(Germany) Porsche AG	2	(Germany) Michael "Smudo" Schmidt	4
(Germany) Porsche AG	2	(United Kingdom) Mark Gillies	5
(Germany) Porsche AG	2	(United Kingdom) Peter Dumbreck	7
(Germany) Porsche AG	2	(Germany) Kai Röffen	8
(Germany) Porsche AG	2	(Japan) Masayuki Yamamoto	9
(Germany) Porsche AG	2	(Italy) Andrea Belicchi	10
(Germany) Porsche AG	2	(Netherlands) Olav Mol	11
(Germany) Porsche AG	33	(Germany) Bernd Maylander	*
(Germany) UPS Porsche-Junior Team	28	(Germany) Jan Seyffarth	2, 7-10 *
(Germany) UPS Porsche-Junior Team	29	(Germany) Lance David Arnold	2, 7-10 *
(Austria) Lechner School Racing Team	3	(Italy) Alessandro Zampedri	All *
(Austria) Lechner School Racing Team	4	(Netherlands) Patrick Huisman	All *
(Austria) Lechner School Racing Team	5	(Belgium) Geoffroy Horion	All *
(Austria) Lechner School Racing Team	6	(Belgium) David Dermont	All *
(Austria) Lechner School Racing Team	66/23	(United Kingdom) Richard Westbrook	1-5, 7, 9-11 *
(Germany) Pro Futura Racing Team Kadach	7	(Belgium) David Saelens	All *
(Germany) Pro Futura Racing Team Kadach	8	(France) Fabrice Walfisch	All *
(Germany) Pro Futura Racing Team Kadach	9	(Belgium) Tim Bergmeister	All *
(Netherlands) Jetstream Motorsport PZ Essen	10	(Netherlands) Simon Frederiks	1-4, 6-11 *
(Netherlands) Jetstream Motorsport PZ Essen	11	(Switzerland) Philip Beyrer	All *
(Netherlands) Jetstream Motorsport PZ Essen	11	(Netherlands) Jeroen Bleekemolen	5
(Germany) Vertu Racing PZ Hofheim	15	(Germany) Matthias Weiland	All *
(Germany) Vertu Racing PZ Hofheim	16	(Germany) Oliver Mayer	All *
(Germany) Vertu Racing PZ Hofheim	17	(Germany) Thomas Messer	3-6, 8-11
(Austria) Konrad Motorsport-PZ Bielefeld	19	(Hungary) Ferenc Ratkai	9
(Austria) Konrad Motorsport-PZ Bielefeld	19	(Germany) Sebastian Stahl	10
(Austria) Konrad Motorsport-PZ Bielefeld	19	(Germany) Peter Scharmach	11
(Austria) Konrad Motorsport-PZ Bielefeld	20	(Austria) Robert Lechner	9-11
(Austria) Konrad Motorsport-PZ Bielefeld	21	(Germany) Uwe Alzen	5-11
(Austria) Konrad Motorsport-PZ Bielefeld	22	(Germany) Klaus Abbelen	5-11
(Germany) MRS PC-Service-Team	30	(Germany) Dirk Werner	4
(Germany) MRS PC-Service-Team	30	(United States) Jochen Rohr	5
(Germany) MRS PC-Service-Team	30	(Netherlands) Duncan Huisman	6, 8-9, 11
(Germany) Tolimit Motorsport	38	(Germany) Werner Fischer	*
(Germany) Tolimit Motorsport	38	(United States) Tomy Drissi	3
(Germany) Tolimit Motorsport	38	(Germany) Klaus Graf	4
(Germany) Tolimit Motorsport	39	(Germany) Christian Menzel	All *
(Germany) Tolimit Motorsport	46	(Austria) Richard Lietz	All *
(Germany) Farnbacher Racing PZN	55	(Germany) Dirk Werner	8, 10-11
(Germany) Farnbacher Racing PZN	66	(Germany) Jörg Bergmeister	8
(Germany) Farnbacher Racing PZN	66	(United States) Ricardo Imery	10-11
Sources:

- Entered non-championship round at Bahrain

== Race calendar and results ==
Round		Circuit	Country	Date	Pole position	Fastest lap	Winning driver	Winning team	Report
NC	R	Bahrain International Circuit	Bahrain	April 3	(United Kingdom) Richard Westbrook	(United Kingdom) Richard Westbrook	(United Kingdom) Richard Westbrook	(Austria) Lechner School Racing Team	Report
1	R	(Italy) Autodromo Enzo e Dino Ferrari	Italy	April 24	(Belgium) David Saelens	(United Kingdom) Richard Westbrook	(Italy) Luca Riccitelli	(Germany) VIP Porsche AG	Report
2	R	(Spain) Circuit de Catalunya	Spain	May 8	(Italy) Alessandro Zampedri	(Belgium) David Saelens	(Italy) Alessandro Zampedri	(Austria) Lechner School Racing Team	Report
3	R	Circuit de Monaco	Monaco	May 21	(Netherlands) Patrick Huisman	(Belgium) David Saelens	(Netherlands) Patrick Huisman	(Austria) Lechner School Racing Team	Report
4	R	(Germany) Nürburgring	Germany	May 29	(Germany) Christian Menzel	(Italy) Alessandro Zampedri	(Germany) Christian Menzel	(Germany) Tolimit Motorsport	Report
5	R1	(United States) Indianapolis Motor Speedway	United States	June 18	(Belgium) David Saelens	(Belgium) David Saelens	(Belgium) David Saelens	(Germany) Pro Futura Racing Team Kadach	Report
5	R2	(United States) Indianapolis Motor Speedway	United States	June 19	(Belgium) David Saelens	(Belgium) David Saelens	(Belgium) David Saelens	(Germany) Pro Futura Racing Team Kadach	Report
6	R	(France) Circuit de Nevers Magny-Cours	France	July 3	(Belgium) David Saelens	(Austria) Richard Lietz	(Austria) Richard Lietz	(Germany) Tolimit Motorsport	Report
7	R	(United Kingdom) Silverstone Circuit	United Kingdom	July 10	(Italy) Alessandro Zampedri	(Netherlands) Patrick Huisman	(Netherlands) Patrick Huisman	(Austria) Lechner School Racing Team	Report
8	R	(Germany) Hockenheimring	Germany	July 24	(Germany) Dirk Werner	(France) Fabrice Walfisch	(Belgium) David Saelens	(Germany) Pro Futura Racing Team Kadach	Report
9	R	(Hungary) Hungaroring	Hungary	July 31	(Netherlands) Patrick Huisman	(Netherlands) Patrick Huisman	(Netherlands) Patrick Huisman	(Austria) Lechner School Racing Team	Report
10	R	(Italy) Autodromo Nazionale Monza	Italy	September 4	(Belgium) David Saelens	(Germany) Uwe Alzen	(Netherlands) Patrick Huisman	(Austria) Lechner School Racing Team	Report
11	R	(Belgium) Circuit de Spa-Francorchamps	Belgium	September 11	(Germany) Dirk Werner	(Germany) Dirk Werner	(Germany) Dirk Werner	(Germany) Farnbacher Racing PZN	Report

== Championship standings ==
Position	1st	2nd	3rd	4th	5th	6th	7th	8th	9th	10th	11th	12th	13th	14th	15th	Ref
Points	20	18	16	14	12	10	9	8	7	6	5	4	3	2	1	

Pos	Driver	BHR (Bahrain)	IMO (Italy)	CAT (Spain)	MON (Monaco)	NÜR (Germany)	IND (United States)		MAG (France)	SIL (United Kingdom)	HOC (Germany)	HUN (Hungary)	MZA (Italy)	SPA (Belgium)	Points
1	(Italy) Alessandro Zampedri	6	8	**1**	3	2	2	2	6	**2**	8	2	3	Ret	173
2	(Netherlands) Patrick Huisman	2	3	2	**1**	4	3	Ret	Ret	1	Ret	**1**	1	2	166
3	(Belgium) David Saelens	Ret	**4**	3	6	10	**1**	**1**	**5**	5	1	11	**Ret**	Ret	145
4	(Germany) Christian Menzel	3	5	6	8	**1**	4	9	4	3	Ret	8	14	5	139
5	(Austria) Richard Lietz	7	6	8	5	8	5	7	1	Ret	5	6	21	6	130
6	(France) Fabrice Walfisch	8	10	10	7	3	7	6	3	6	2	Ret	6	8	127
7	(Germany) Tim Bergmeister	Ret	9	9	9	12	Ret	5	8	8	7	3	4	9	110
8	(Belgium) Geoffroy Horion	Ret	7	4	10	6	Ret	8	10	12	9	Ret	2	4	107
9	(United Kingdom) Richard Westbrook	**1**	2	5	4	5	11	Ret		7		Ret	7	7	95
10	(Germany) Uwe Alzen						14	4	2	4	6	Ret	20†	3	87
11	(Switzerland) Philip Beyrer	Ret	12	11	16†	11	8	Ret	7	14	10	10	11	13	80
12	(Belgium) David Dermont	10	13	15	15	14	15	15	12	17	DNS	12	16	14	53
13	(Germany) Klaus Abbelen						10	10	Ret	15	12	13	15	18	43
14	(Germany) Oliver Mayer	13	15	18†	18	17	13	16	13	16	13	14	Ret	16	40
15	(Germany) Thomas Messer				12	13	9	13	DNS		15	16	Ret	15	36
16	(Netherlands) Simon Frederiks	11	Ret	16	11	16			11	Ret	14	15	18	Ret	34
17	(Germany) Matthias Weiland	15	14	17	17	Ret	16	12	14	18	17	17	19	19	34
Guest drivers ineligible for championship points
	(Germany) Dirk Werner					9					**18**†		5	**1**	0
	(Italy) Luca Riccitelli		1												0
	(Monaco) Stéphane Ortelli				2										0
	(Netherlands) Jeroen Bleekemolen						6	3							0
	(Germany) Jan Seyffarth	4		12						9	3	9	9		0
	(Germany) Lance David Arnold	9		14						13	4	5	10		0
	(Netherlands) Duncan Huisman								9		11	4		10	0
	(Germany) Bernd Mayländer	5													0
	(Portugal) Pedro Couceiro			7											0
	(Germany) Klaus Graf					7									0
	(Austria) Robert Lechner											7	8	11	0
	(New Zealand) Fabian Coulthard									10					0
	(Switzerland) Gabriele Gardel		11												0
	(Germany) Werner Fischer	12													0
	(United Kingdom) Mark Gillies						12	11							0
	(United Kingdom) Peter Dumbreck									11					0
	(Italy) Stefano Comandini												12		0
	(Belgium) Stéphane Lémeret													12	0
	(Spain) Ignacio Gabari			13											0
	(United States) Tomy Drissi				13										0
	(Germany) Sebastian Stahl												13		0
	(Bahrain) Jaber Al Khalifa	14													0
	(Hong Kong) Matthew Marsh				14										0
	(United States) Travis Pastrana						Ret	14							0
	(Switzerland) Marc Surer					15									0
	(Germany) Olaf Manthey										16				0
	(United States) Jochen Rohr						17	17							0
	(United States) Ricardo Imery												17	DNS	0
	(Germany) Peter Scharmach													17	0
	(Germany) Michael "Smudo" Schmidt					18									0
	(Hungary) László Palik											18			0
	(Germany) Jörg Bergmeister										19†				0
	(Germany) Kai Röffen										20				0
	(Bahrain) Salman Al Khalifa	Ret													0
	(Japan) Masayuki Yamamoto											Ret			0
	(Hungary) Ferenc Ratkai											Ret			0
	(Italy) Andrea Belicchi												Ret		0
	(Netherlands) Olav Mol													Ret	0
Pos	Driver	BHR (Bahrain)	IMO (Italy)	CAT (Spain)	MON (Monaco)	NÜR (Germany)	IND (United States)		MAG (France)	SIL (United Kingdom)	HOC (Germany)	HUN (Hungary)	MZA (Italy)	SPA (Belgium)	Points

Colour	Result
Gold	Winner
Silver	Second place
Bronze	Third place
Green	Points classification
Blue	Non-points classification
Blue	Non-classified finish (NC)
Purple	Retired, not classified (Ret)
Red	Did not qualify (DNQ)
Red	Did not pre-qualify (DNPQ)
Black	Disqualified (DSQ)
White	Did not start (DNS)
White	Withdrew (WD)
White	Race cancelled (C)
Blank	Did not practice (DNP)
Blank	Did not arrive (DNA)
Blank	Excluded (EX)

**Bold** – Pole
Italics – Fastest Lap

† — Drivers did not finish the race, but were classified as they completed over 90% of the race distance.

=== Teams' Championship ===
Pos	Team	BHR (Bahrain)	IMO (Italy)	CAT (Spain)	MON (Monaco)	NÜR (Germany)	IND (United States)		MAG (France)	SIL (United Kingdom)	HOC (Germany)	HUN (Hungary)	MZA (Italy)	SPA (Belgium)	Points
1	(Austria) Lechner Racing School Team 1	2	3	1	1	2	2	2	6	1	8	1	1	2	345
1	(Austria) Lechner Racing School Team 1	6	8	2	3	4	3	Ret	Ret	2	Ret	2	3	Ret	345
2	(Germany) Tolimit Motorsport	3	5	6	5	1	4	7	1	3	5	6	14	5	278
2	(Germany) Tolimit Motorsport	7	6	8	8	8	5	9	4	Ret	Ret	8	21	6	278
3	(Germany) Pro Futura Racing Team Kadach	8	4	3	6	10	1	1	5	5	1	3	4	9	263
3	(Germany) Pro Futura Racing Team Kadach	Ret	9	9	9	12	Ret	5	8	8	7	11	Ret	Ret	263
4	(Austria) Lechner Racing School Team 2	1	2	4	4	5	11	8	10	7	9	Ret	2	4	214
4	(Austria) Lechner Racing School Team 2	Ret	7	5	10	6	Ret	Ret		12		Ret	7	7	214
5	(Netherlands) Jetstream Motorsport PZ Essen	11	12	11	11	11	6	3	7	14	10	10	11	13	162
5	(Netherlands) Jetstream Motorsport PZ Essen	Ret	Ret	16	16†	16	8	Ret	11	Ret	14	15	18	Ret	162
6	(Austria) Konrad Motorsport PZ Bielefeld						10	4	2	4	6	13	15	3	141
6	(Austria) Konrad Motorsport PZ Bielefeld						14	10	Ret	15	12	Ret	20†	18	141
6	(Germany) VERTU Racing PZ Hofheim	13	14	17	17	17	13	12	13	16	13	14	19	16	117
6	(Germany) VERTU Racing PZ Hofheim	15	15	18†	18	Ret	16	16	14	18	17	17	Ret	19	117
Guest teams ineligible for championship points
	(Germany) Porsche AG	5	1	7	2	15	12	11		10	16	18	12	12	0
	(Germany) Porsche AG	14	11	13	14	18	Ret	14		11	20	Ret	Ret	Ret	0
	(Germany) Farnbacher Racing PZN										18†		5	1	0
	(Germany) Farnbacher Racing PZN										19†		17	DNS	0
	(Germany) UPS Porsche Junior Team	4		12						9	3	5	9		0
	(Germany) UPS Porsche Junior Team	9		14						13	4	9	10		0
	(Germany) MRS PC-Service-Team					9	17	17	9		11	4		10	0
Pos	Team	BHR (Bahrain)	IMO (Italy)	CAT (Spain)	MON (Monaco)	NÜR (Germany)	IND (United States)		MAG (France)	SIL (United Kingdom)	HOC (Germany)	HUN (Hungary)	MZA (Italy)	SPA (Belgium)	Points
