= The Bowery House =

Hotel in Manhattan, New York

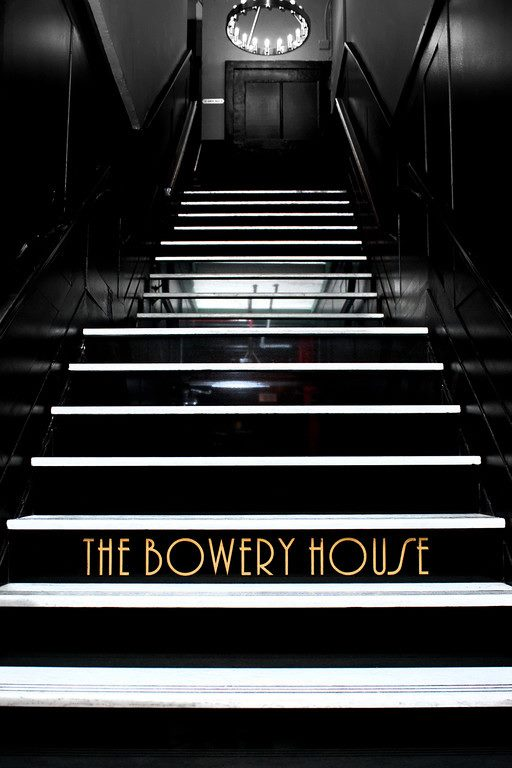
- The Bowery House entrance staircase.
- Interactive map of the The Bowery House area

General information
- Location: 218-220 Bowery, New York City, New York 10012
- Coordinates: 40°43′19″N 73°59′37.5″W
- Opened: 2011
- Owner: Alessandro Zampedri; Sanford Kunkel
- Operator: Z/K Hospitality

Technical details
- Floor count: 4
- Floor area: 1,600 m^{2} (17,000 sq ft)

Design and construction
- Developer: Z/K Hospitality

Other information
- Number of rooms: 104
- Number of restaurants: The Bowery Kitchen

Website
- http://www.theboweryhouse.com/

The Bowery House is a historic hotel on 220 Bowery in Manhattan, New York City, that mimics its former incarnation as a flophouse.

== History ==
220 Bowery was designed by architect Jacob Fisher and built in 1924 in the Colonial Revival style after the property purchased by L Cohen & Sons that same year as a 4-story brick with stores on the ground floor and hotel. The property formerly housed a three-story building. The hotel first opened its doors as The Prince Hotel and accommodated 200 people. By the 1940s, in an era when the Bowery was known as New York City's "Skid Row," the hotel had been transformed to accommodate returning soldiers from World War II, down-and-outs and the down-on-their-luck as a flophouse. All of the floors were rebuilt with single room cabins, bunk rooms, and communal bathrooms to maximize occupancy. While these rooms were meant to be temporary lodging, guests of The Prince Hotel could indulge in all of the vices that the neighborhood provided and many of its occupants stayed on for extended periods of time.

The Bowery began gentrifying in the 1990s with new high-rise condominiums and upscale businesses. In 2000, Click modeling agency co-owner Joey Grill, purchased the building under AHJ Corporation for $2.2 million to create luxury lofts. New tenants were no longer taken and the upper floors were leased to Common Ground (now known as Breaking Ground), a nonprofit offering homeless services.

== Hotel ==
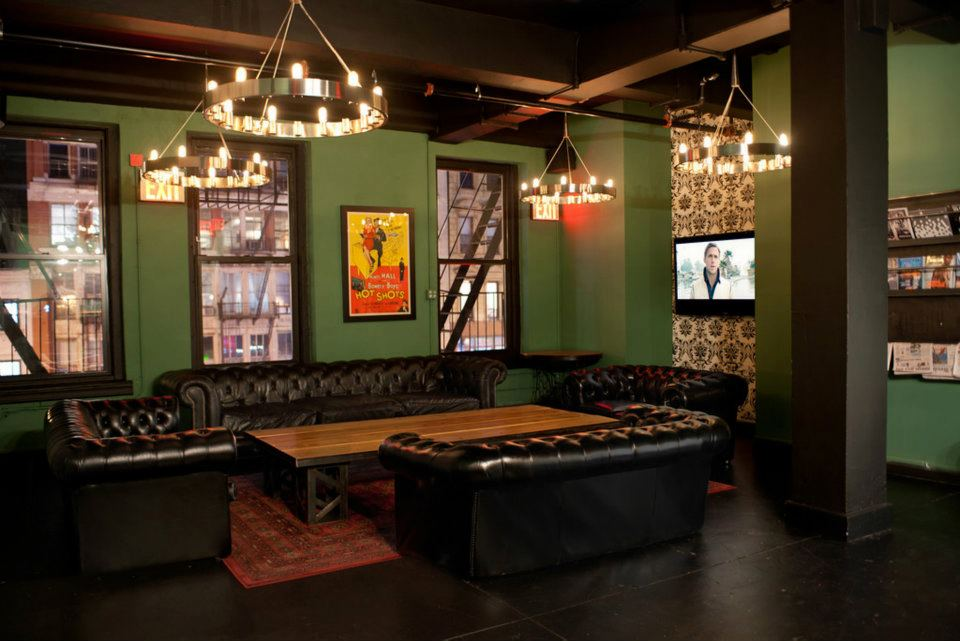
The Bowery House third floor lobby.

In 2011, The Bowery House opened its doors after its redevelopment by Italian race car driver Alessandro Zampedri and American real estate entrepreneur Sanford Kunkel. On the second floors long-term residents rent the tiny stalls, six feet long by five feet wide. On the third and fourth floors house tourists.

== Controversy ==
There is concern that the tenants who remained on after the flophouse days, are being used as an attraction to artificially manufacture a nostalgia of the area in a more attractive way for high-end tourists.
