= 2009 Porsche Supercup =

17th Porsche Supercup season

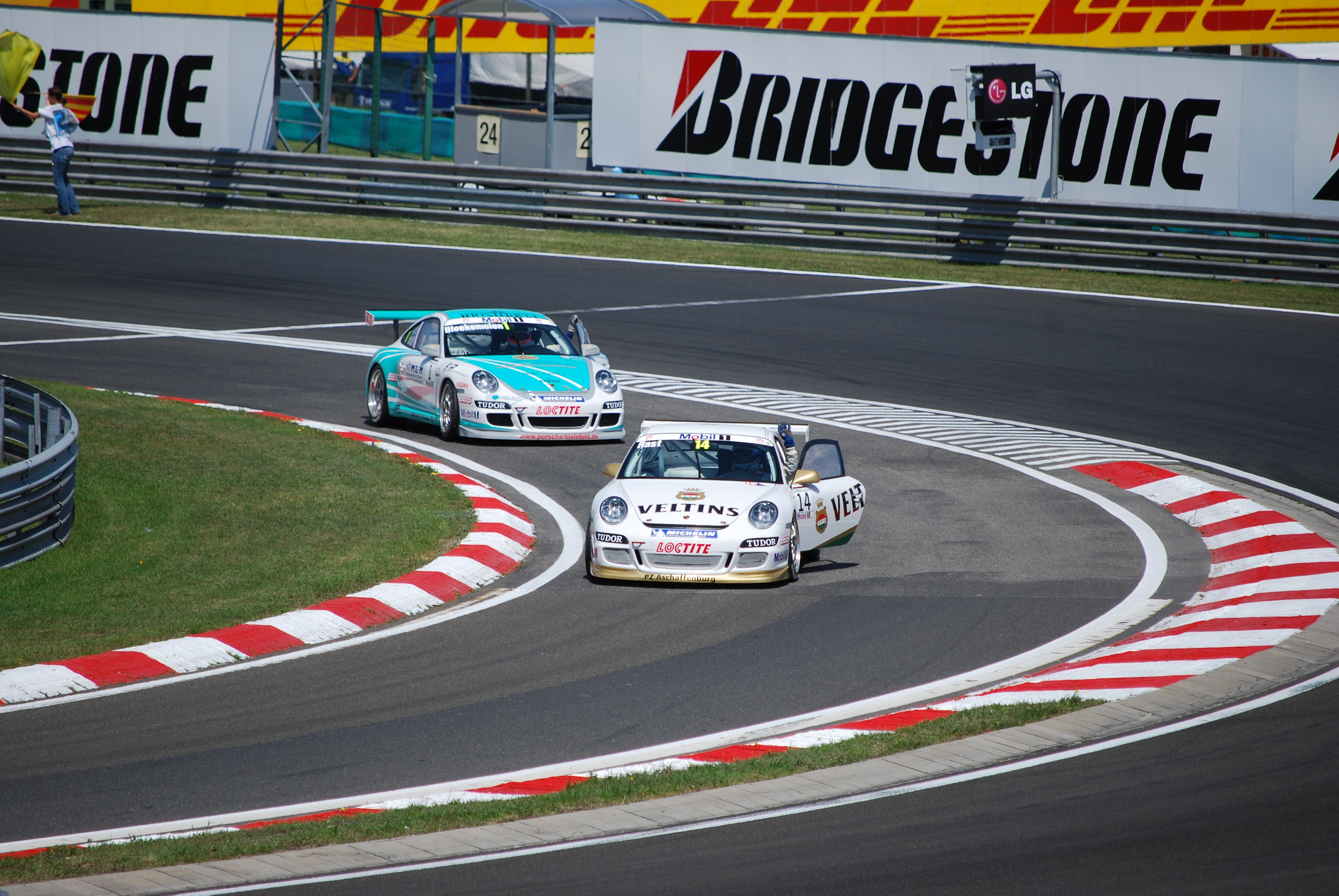
Jeroen Bleekemolen and René Rast occupied the top two positions in the championship, with Bleekemolen retaining his title.

The 2009 Porsche Mobil 1 Supercup season was the 17th Porsche Supercup season. The races were all supporting races in the 2009 Formula One season. The calendar went across Europe and to Bahrain and the United Arab Emirates in Asia. Jeroen Bleekemolen won the title, finishing every single race on the podium.

== Teams and drivers ==
In the Porsche Supercup, the Porsche 911 GT3 Cup type 997 is the standard competition vehicle. This car, based on the Porsche 911 Carrera, is specifically designed for motorsport. All cars in the series are technically identical, ensuring a focus on driver skill and strategy. The technical specifications of the car include:

- Power: 450 hp
- Transmission: Sequential six-speed gearbox
- Aerodynamics: Aero pack for enhanced performance
- Braking: Porsche Ceramic Composite Brake (PCCB), exclusive to the Porsche Supercup
- Weight: 1,200 kg

The PCCB system is a key feature of the Supercup vehicles, offering lightweight construction and exceptional braking capabilities.

Team	No.	Drivers	Rounds
(Austria) Konrad Motorsport	1	(Netherlands) Jeroen Bleekemolen	All
(Austria) Konrad Motorsport	2	(Spain) Siso Cunill	All
(Austria) Konrad Motorsport	9	(Czech Republic) Jiří Janák	1–10
(Austria) Konrad Motorsport	9	(United Kingdom) Nick Tandy	11
(Austria) Konrad Motorsport	10	(Italy) Alessandro Zampedri	3, 10
(Austria) Konrad Motorsport	10	(Germany) Patrick Hirsch	6
(Austria) Konrad Motorsport	10	(Brazil) Valdeno Brito	8–9
(Austria) Walter Lechner Racing	3	(Slovakia) Štefan Rosina	All
(Austria) Walter Lechner Racing	4	(Republic of Ireland) Damien Faulkner	All
(Austria) Walter Lechner Racing	16	(Saudi Arabia) Abdulaziz Al Faisal	1–3, 7, 11
(Netherlands) Federsand-Jetstream Motorsport	5	(United Kingdom) Richard Westbrook	1–4
(Netherlands) Federsand-Jetstream Motorsport	5	(Netherlands) Renger van der Zande	5
(Netherlands) Federsand-Jetstream Motorsport	6	(New Zealand) Matt Halliday	1–5
(United States) SANITEC Racing	7	(United States) Will Langhorne	All
(United States) SANITEC Racing	8	(Italy) Luigi Ferrara	1–4
(United States) SANITEC Racing	8	(Germany) Christian Engelhart	5–6
(United States) SANITEC Racing	8	(New Zealand) Matt Halliday	11
(United States) SANITEC Racing	8	(Spain) Isaac Tutumlu	7–10
(United States) SANITEC Racing	25	(Spain) Isaac Tutumlu	6
(Germany) SPS Automotive	11	(Netherlands) Patrick Huisman	All
(Germany) SPS Automotive	12	(United Kingdom) Richard Williams	All
(Germany) SPS Automotive	20	(Germany) Lance David Arnold	5–10
(Germany) SPS Automotive	20	(Italy) Alessandro Zampedri	11
(Germany) Veltins MRS Racing	14	(Germany) René Rast	All
(Germany) Veltins MRS Racing	15	(Austria) Norbert Siedler	All
(Germany) Seyffarth/Tolimit Motorsport (United Arab Emirates) Abu Dhabi Race Team	21	(Germany) Jan Seyffarth	6, 7, 9
(Germany) Seyffarth/Tolimit Motorsport (United Arab Emirates) Abu Dhabi Race Team	21	(Germany) Thomas Jäger	11
(Germany) Seyffarth/Tolimit Motorsport (United Arab Emirates) Abu Dhabi Race Team	22	(Russia) David Sigacev	6, 7
(Germany) Seyffarth/Tolimit Motorsport (United Arab Emirates) Abu Dhabi Race Team	22	(Germany) Stefan Wendt	9
(Germany) Seyffarth/Tolimit Motorsport (United Arab Emirates) Abu Dhabi Race Team	22	(United Arab Emirates) Khaled Al Qubaisi	11
(Italy) AB Motorsport	27	(Italy) Cristian Passuti	3
(Italy) AB Motorsport	27	(Italy) Angelo Proietti	10
(Italy) AB Motorsport	28	(Italy) Raffaele Giannoni	3, 10
(Italy) Centro Porsche Padova	29	(Switzerland) Gabriele Gardel	3, 10
(Italy) Centro Porsche Padova	30	(Italy) Andrea Belicchi	3
(Italy) Centro Porsche Padova	30	(Italy) Andrea Sonvico	10
(United Kingdom) Porsche Cars Great Britain	31	(Republic of Ireland) Michael Leonard	3
(United Kingdom) Porsche Cars Great Britain	32	(United Kingdom) Ian Khan	3
(United Kingdom) Porsche Cars Great Britain	33	(United Kingdom) Glynn Geddie	3
(United Kingdom) Porsche Cars Great Britain	34	(United States) Robert Hissom	3
(United Kingdom) Porsche Cars Great Britain	35	(United Kingdom) James Sutton	5
(United Kingdom) Porsche Cars Great Britain	44	(United Kingdom) James Sutton	11
(United Kingdom) Porsche Cars Great Britain	36	(United Kingdom) Tim Harvey	5
(United Kingdom) Porsche Cars Great Britain	37	(United Kingdom) Aaron Scott	5
(United Kingdom) Porsche Cars Great Britain	43	(United Kingdom) Richard Westbrook	11
(Italy) Ebimotors	38	(Italy) Mauro Massironi	6, 9–10
(Italy) Ebimotors	38	(Italy) Alessandro Balzan	11
(Italy) Ebimotors	39	(Italy) Massimiliano Fantini	6, 10
(Italy) Ebimotors	39	(Italy) Alessandro Bonacini	9
(Italy) Ebimotors	39	(Italy) Emanuele Busnelli	11

== Race calendar and results ==
Round		Circuit	Country	Date	Pole position	Fastest lap	Winning driver	Winning team
1	R1	Bahrain International Circuit	Bahrain	25 April	(Netherlands) Jeroen Bleekemolen	(Netherlands) Jeroen Bleekemolen	(Netherlands) Jeroen Bleekemolen	(Austria) Konrad Motorsport
1	R2	Bahrain International Circuit	Bahrain	26 April	(Netherlands) Jeroen Bleekemolen	(Netherlands) Jeroen Bleekemolen	(Netherlands) Jeroen Bleekemolen	(Austria) Konrad Motorsport
2	R	(Spain) Circuit de Catalunya	Spain	10 May	(Netherlands) Jeroen Bleekemolen	(Netherlands) Jeroen Bleekemolen	(United Kingdom) Richard Westbrook	(Netherlands) Federsand-Jetstream Motorsport
3	R	Circuit de Monaco	Monaco	24 May	(United Kingdom) Richard Westbrook	(Germany) René Rast	(United Kingdom) Richard Westbrook	(Netherlands) Federsand-Jetstream Motorsport
4	R	(Turkey) Istanbul Park	Turkey	7 June	(Netherlands) Jeroen Bleekemolen	(Germany) René Rast	(Netherlands) Jeroen Bleekemolen	(Austria) Konrad Motorsport
5	R	(United Kingdom) Silverstone Circuit	United Kingdom	21 June	(Germany) René Rast	(Germany) René Rast	(Germany) René Rast	(Germany) Veltins MRS Racing
6	R	(Germany) Nürburgring	Germany	12 July	(Germany) René Rast	(Germany) René Rast	(Germany) René Rast	(Germany) Veltins MRS Racing
7	R	(Hungary) Hungaroring	Hungary	26 July	(Germany) René Rast	(Germany) René Rast	(Germany) René Rast	(Germany) Veltins MRS Racing
8	R	(Spain) Valencia Street Circuit	Spain	23 August	(Germany) René Rast	(Netherlands) Jeroen Bleekemolen	(Germany) René Rast	(Germany) Veltins MRS Racing
9	R	(Belgium) Circuit de Spa-Francorchamps	Belgium	30 August	(Netherlands) Jeroen Bleekemolen	(Germany) Jan Seyffarth	(Netherlands) Jeroen Bleekemolen	(Austria) Konrad Motorsport
10	R	(Italy) Autodromo Nazionale Monza	Italy	13 September	(Germany) René Rast	(Germany) René Rast	(Germany) René Rast	(Germany) Veltins MRS Racing
11	R1	(United Arab Emirates) Yas Marina Circuit	United Arab Emirates	31 October	(Netherlands) Jeroen Bleekemolen	(Netherlands) Jeroen Bleekemolen	(Germany) René Rast	(Germany) Veltins MRS Racing
11	R2	(United Arab Emirates) Yas Marina Circuit	United Arab Emirates	1 November	(Netherlands) Jeroen Bleekemolen	(United Kingdom) Nick Tandy	(Netherlands) Jeroen Bleekemolen	(Austria) Konrad Motorsport

== Championship standings ==
Position	1st	2nd	3rd	4th	5th	6th	7th	8th	9th	10th	11th	12th	13th	14th	15th	Pole	Ref
Points	20	18	16	14	12	10	9	8	7	6	5	4	3	2	1	2	

Pos	Driver	BHR (Bahrain)		CAT (Spain)	MON (Monaco)	IST (Turkey)	SIL (United Kingdom)	NÜR (Germany)	HUN (Hungary)	VAL (Spain)	SPA (Belgium)	MZA (Italy)	YMC (United Arab Emirates)		Points
1	(Netherlands) Jeroen Bleekemolen	**1**	**1**	**2**	3	**1**	2	3	3	2	**1**	2	**3**	**1**	254
2	(Germany) René Rast	Ret	2	DSQ	2	2	**1**	**1**	**1**	**1**	17†	**1**	1	2	207
3	(Slovakia) Štefan Rosina	5	10	4	4	6	11	2	4	6	5	4	5	8	164
4	(Netherlands) Patrick Huisman	2	4	5	9	7	4	4	11	4	9	6	7	12	148
5	(Austria) Norbert Siedler	Ret	7	7	8	5	15	5	7	9	2	3	4	11	132
6	(Republic of Ireland) Damien Faulkner	4	6	6	7	12	16	8	5	Ret	4	5	11	4	126
7	(New Zealand) Matt Halliday	3	8	3	6	13	5						6	9	93
8	(United Kingdom) Richard Williams	Ret	5	8	Ret	8	12	6	Ret	5	6	18	12	10	90
9	(United Kingdom) Richard Westbrook	10	3	1	**1**	4							14	3	78
10	(Czech Republic) Jiří Janák	Ret	11	9	10	3	7	10	8	Ret	10	8			77
11	(Spain) Siso Cunill	8	NC	Ret	12	9	13	14	6	8	15	10	10	Ret	73
12	(United States) Will Langhorne	7	12	Ret	13	11	Ret	15	10	7	11	12	8	14	72
13	(Germany) Lance David Arnold						6	9	Ret	3	8	7			55
14	(Saudi Arabia) Abdulaziz Al Faisal	9	13	Ret	19				9				16	15	33
15	(Italy) Luigi Ferrara	6	9	Ret	Ret	10									23
16	(Germany) Christian Engelhart						10	11							15
17	(Netherlands) Renger van der Zande						9								9
guest drivers ineligible for championship points
–	(Germany) Jan Seyffarth							7	2		3				0
–	(United Kingdom) Nick Tandy												2	Ret	0
–	(United Kingdom) James Sutton						3						9	13	0
–	(Italy) Alessandro Balzan												18†	5	0
–	(Italy) Andrea Belicchi				5										0
–	(Germany) Thomas Jäger												15	6	0
–	(Italy) Alessandro Zampedri				17							9	13	7	0
–	(Brazil) Valdeno Brito									Ret	7				0
–	(United Kingdom) Tim Harvey						8								0
–	(Switzerland) Gabriele Gardel				11							14			0
–	(Italy) Massimiliano Fantini							17				11			0
–	(Russia) David Sigacev							12	12						0
–	(Italy) Mauro Massironi							18			12	15			0
–	(Spain) Isaac Tutumlu							16	13	Ret	13	13			0
–	(Germany) Patrick Hirsch							13							0
–	(Italy) Cristian Passuti				14										0
–	(United Kingdom) Aaron Scott						14								0
–	(Germany) Stefan Wendt										14				0
–	(United Kingdom) Glynn Geddie				15										0
–	(Italy) Emanuele Busnelli												17	16	0
–	(Republic of Ireland) Michael Leonard				16										0
–	(Italy) Alessandro Bonacini										16				0
–	(Italy) Angelo Proietti											16			0
–	(Italy) Raffaele Giannoni				18							17			0
–	(United Arab Emirates) Khaled Al Qubaisi												Ret	17	0
–	(Italy) Andrea Sonvico											19†			0
–	(United Kingdom) Ian Khan				20										0
–	(United States) Robert Hissom				Ret										0
Pos	Driver	BHR (Bahrain)		CAT (Spain)	MON (Monaco)	IST (Turkey)	SIL (United Kingdom)	NÜR (Germany)	HUN (Hungary)	VAL (Spain)	SPA (Belgium)	MZA (Italy)	YMC (United Arab Emirates)		Points

Colour	Result
Gold	Winner
Silver	Second place
Bronze	Third place
Green	Points classification
Blue	Non-points classification
Blue	Non-classified finish (NC)
Purple	Retired, not classified (Ret)
Red	Did not qualify (DNQ)
Red	Did not pre-qualify (DNPQ)
Black	Disqualified (DSQ)
White	Did not start (DNS)
White	Withdrew (WD)
White	Race cancelled (C)
Blank	Did not practice (DNP)
Blank	Did not arrive (DNA)
Blank	Excluded (EX)

**Bold** – Pole
Italics – Fastest Lap

† — Drivers did not finish the race, but were classified as they completed over 90% of the race distance.
