= 1998 Macau Grand Prix =

Formula Three motor race

Race details
Date	22 November 1998
Location	Guia Circuit, Macau
Course	Temporary street circuit 6.120 km (3.803 mi)
Distance	Leg 1; 15 laps, 73.44 km (45.63 mi); Leg 2; 15 laps, 73.44 km (45.63 mi)
- Leg 1

Pole
Driver	(Austria) Robert Lechner	GM-DSF-F3 Team
Time	2:15.962

Fastest Lap
Driver	(United Kingdom) Peter Dumbreck	TOM'S
Time	2:15.727

Podium
First	(Brazil) Enrique Bernoldi	Promatecme
Second	(Austria) Robert Lechner	GM-DSF-F3 Team
Third	(United Kingdom) Peter Dumbreck	TOM'S
- Leg 2
Driver	(Brazil) Enrique Bernoldi	Promatecme

Fastest Lap
Driver	(Belgium) Bas Leinders	Van Amersfoort Racing
Time	2:14.491

Podium
First	(United Kingdom) Peter Dumbreck	TOM'S
Second	(Brazil) Ricardo Maurício	Paul Stewart Racing
Third	(Brazil) Enrique Bernoldi	Promatecme

The 1998 Macau Grand Prix Formula Three was the 45th Macau Grand Prix race to be held on the streets of Macau on 22 November 1998. It was the fifteenth edition for Formula Three cars. Peter Dumbreck of the TOM'S team won the two-leg aggregate 30-lap race by three-thousands of a second (about 12 cm (120 mm)) over Paul Stewart Racing driver Ricardo Maurício, the closest margin of victory in the history of the Macau Grand Prix and one of the closest in motor racing history.

== Entry list ==
Team	No	Driver	Vehicle	Engine
(France) Gauloises Graff Racing	1	(France) David Terrien	Dallara 396	Opel
(Netherlands) Van Amersfoort Racing	2	(Belgium) Bas Leinders	Dallara 398	Opel
(Netherlands) Van Amersfoort Racing	3	(Netherlands) Christijan Albers	Dallara 398	Opel
(Japan) TOM'S	5	(United Kingdom) Peter Dumbreck	Dallara 398	Toyota
(Japan) TOM'S	6	(Japan) Shingo Tachi	Dallara 398	Toyota
(Italy) EF Project	7	(Italy) Michele Gasparini	Dallara 397	Fiat
(France) Promatecme	8	(Brazil) Enrique Bernoldi	Dallara 398	Renault
(Italy) Team Ghinzani	9	(Italy) Paolo Montin	Dallara 397	Fiat
(Japan) Toda Racing	10	(Japan) Hiroki Katoh	Dallara 398	Mugen-Honda
(France) Gauloises ASM Formule 3	11	(Belgium) David Saelens	Dallara 396	Renault
(France) Gauloises ASM Formule 3	12	(France) Sebastien Dumez	Dallara 396	Renault
(United Kingdom) Paul Stewart Racing	15	(Brazil) Luciano Burti	Dallara 398	Mugen-Honda
(United Kingdom) Paul Stewart Racing	16	(Brazil) Ricardo Maurício	Dallara 398	Mugen-Honda
(Germany) GM-DSF-F3 Team	17	(Austria) Robert Lechner	Dallara 397	Opel
(Germany) GM-DSF-F3 Team	18	(Sweden) Peter Sundberg	Dallara 397	Opel
(Italy) Prema Powerteam	19	(Portugal) André Couto	Dallara 397	Opel
(Italy) Prema Powerteam	20	(Netherlands) Donny Crevels	Dallara 397	Opel
(France) La Filiere	21	(France) Franck Montagny	Martini MK73	Opel
(France) La Filiere	22	(Switzerland) Marcel Fässler	Martini MK73	Opel
(France) La Filiere	23	(France) Sébastien Bourdais	Martini MK73	Opel
(United Kingdom) Rowan Racing	25	(United Kingdom) Martin O'Connell	Dallara 398	Toyota
(United Kingdom) Speedsport F3 Racing Team	26	(United Kingdom) Darren Manning	Dallara 398	Mugen-Honda
(United Kingdom) Fortec Motorsports	27	(Denmark) Kristian Kolby	Dallara 398	Mugen-Honda
(United Kingdom) Fortec Motorsports	28	(Australia) Andrej Pavicevic	Dallara 398	Mugen-Honda
(Germany) MKL F3 Racing	29	(Germany) Lucas Luhr	Dallara 397	Opel
(United Kingdom) Carlin	30	(India) Narain Karthikeyan	Dallara 397	Mugen-Honda
(United Kingdom) Alan Docking Racing	31	(Malaysia) Alex Yoong	Dallara 397	Mugen-Honda
(France) Signature	32	(Portugal) Tiago Monteiro	Dallara 396	Fiat
(Japan) Speed Master Skill Speed	33	(Japan) Daisuke Itoh	Dallara 398	Mugen-Honda
(Japan) Nakajima Honda	64	(Japan) Tsugio Matsuda	Dallara 398	Mugen-Honda

== Race results ==
Peter Dumbreck of the TOM'S team won the two-leg aggregate 30-lap race by three-thousands of a second (about 12 cm (120 mm)) over Paul Stewart Racing driver Ricardo Maurício.
