= Richard Westbrook =

British racing driver (born 1975)

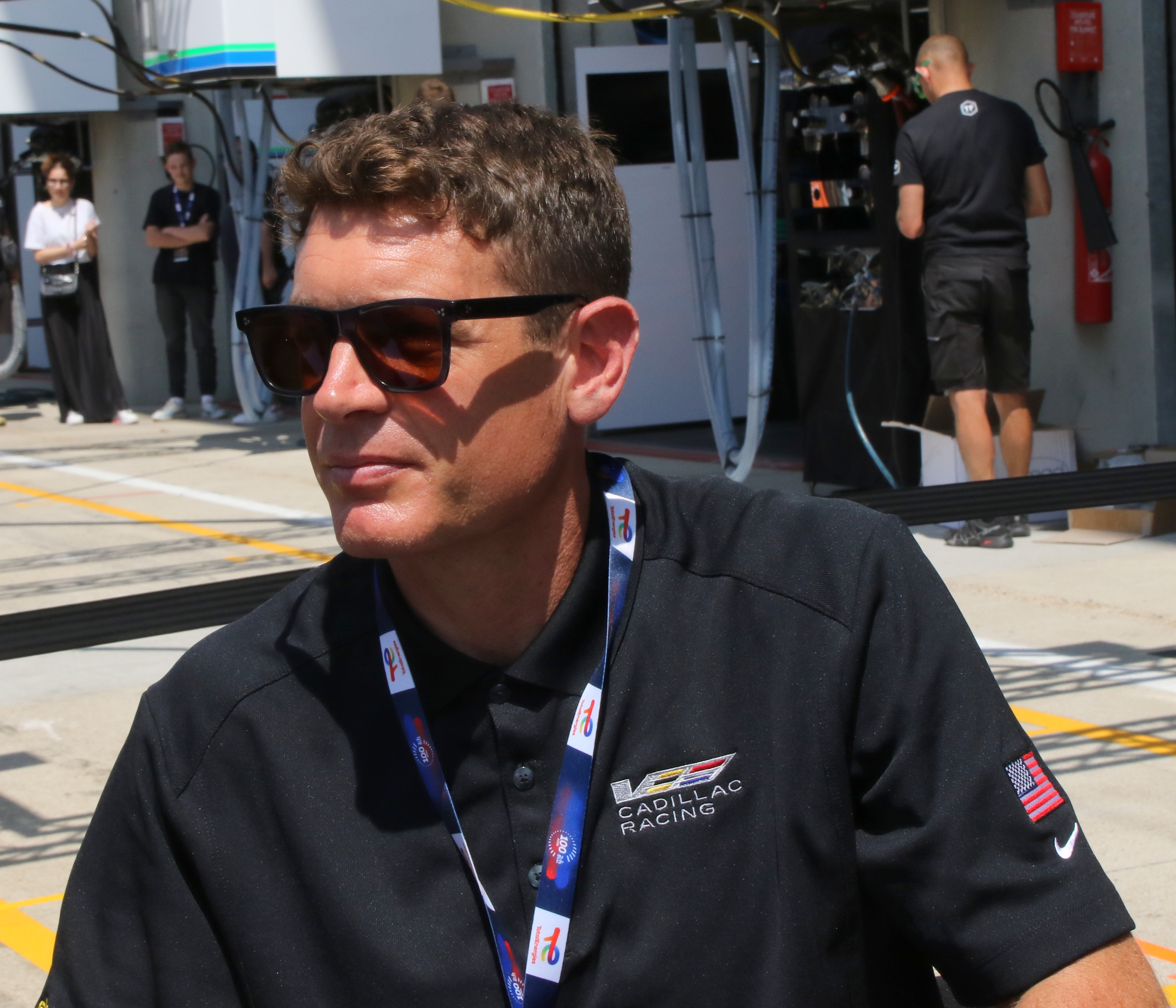
- Westbrook in 2023
- Nationality: (United Kingdom) British
- Born: 10 July 1975 (age 51) Chelmsford, Essex, England, UK

IMSA SportsCar Championship career
- Debut season: 2014
- Categorisation: FIA Platinum
- Car number: 02
- Former teams: Spirit of Daytona Racing; Chip Ganassi Racing; TF Sport; JDC-Miller Motorsports
- Starts: 76
- Wins: 11
- Poles: 7
- Fastest laps: 6
- Best finish: 2nd in 2015 (Overall), 2016, 2018 (GTLM)

Previous series
- 2013–14 2008–09 2008–13 2011–2013 2010–13 2005–10 2007–10 2009 2006–08 1996 1996 1993: FIA WEC; FIA GT Championship; American Le Mans Series; Blancpain Endurance Series; British GT Championship; Belcar; Le Mans Series; ADAC GT Masters; Porsche Supercup; Austria Formula 3 Cup; German F3; Formula Vauxhall Winter Series

Championship titles
- 2009 2006–07 2004: FIA GT2; Porsche Supercup; Porsche Carrera Cup GB

Awards
- 2007 2006 1994: BRDC award for Outstanding Achievement; Autosport International Driver of the Year Nomination; McLaren Autosport Young Driver of the Year Award Nomination

24 Hours of Le Mans career
- Years: 2010–2014, 2016
- Teams: BMS Scuderia Italia, Corvette Racing
- Best finish: 3rd (2010, 2016)
- Class wins: 0

Richard Westbrook (born 10 July 1975) is a British former professional racing driver, noted for his success in sports car racing.

A two-time Porsche Supercup champion in 2006 and 2007, Westbrook became a Porsche factory driver and won the 2009 FIA GT Championship in GT2. Between 2011 and 2015, Westbrook drove for Corvette in both the American Le Mans Series and Rolex Sports Car Series. He won the 2013 12 Hours of Sebring in GT and was 2015 United SportsCar runner-up in DP. Between 2016 and 2019, Westbrook drove the new Ford GT for the Chip Ganassi works team in IMSA, winning the 2018 24 Hours of Daytona in GTLM.

In his late forties, Westbrook competed in the FIA World Endurance Championship in Hypercar. He finished third overall at the 24 Hours of Le Mans twice—in 2022 for Glickenhaus and in 2023 for Cadillac. He retired from motorsport at the end of 2024.

== Early career ==
=== Early years (1986–1996) ===
Born in Chelmsford, Westbrook attended St Joseph's College, Ipswich and began karting in 1986.

Following a successful Formula Vauxhall Winter Series campaign in 1993 (second place in the series, one win), Westbrook headed to Europe to compete in the Formula Opel Lotus Euroseries. After a promising showing (fourth place in the series, one win) in his debut year, he returned in 1995 and took three victories, narrowly missing out on third place in the series.

In 1996, Westbrook moved up to Formula 3 and headed for the highly competitive German Formula 3 Series (with Tokmakidis Motorsport) and the Austrian Formula 3 Cup (Achletiner Motorsport). In German F3, he was up against a number of European drivers, including future F1 stars like Nick Heidfeld and Jarno Trulli and he took one win in a short campaign.

In Austria, having missed the opening pair of races due to cutting a late deal, Westbrook saw off the challenge of German racer Tim Bergmeister and a host of local drivers to take two victories in 1996 before missing the final two rounds due to budgetary issues.

=== Career break (1997–2002) ===
Having been unable to secure the budget required to compete and advance his career, Westbrook was forced to take a lengthy six-year break from racing, before convincing a friend to loan him the money to buy a Porsche GT3 Cup Car for the 2002 season.

== Porsche (2003–2010) ==
The Porsche Carrera Cup GB commenced in 2003 and Westbrook was immediately a front-runner. Between 2003 and 2005, he was dominant; taking the title in 2004 (seven wins, 17 podiums, eight pole positions, four fastest laps) with Redline Racing and finishing as runner-up in 2003 (Team BCR), and 2005 (Redline Racing). Indeed, his 2005 totals for victories and pole positions (14 wins, eight pole-positions) are both series records and he went on to take 16 podiums across the season.

Having done a few Supercup races in 2002 with Kadach Racing Team and in 2003 with Porsche Cars Great Britain, Westbrook returned in 2005 in a Lechner Racing School Team prepared Porsche in rounds which did not clash with his UK commitments. He won the season opener in Bahrain and came ninth overall, adding a fastest lap to his tally too.

In 2006 with RT Morellato PZ Essen (four wins, 11 podiums, four pole positions, three fastest laps), Westbrook finished every Supercup race on the podium, wrapping up the title with two races to go, against drivers such as Uwe Alzen, Alessandro Zampedri and Patrick Huisman. He has also competed in several Carrera races in Germany (EMC Buchbinder ARAXA Racing – one win, four podiums, two fastest laps) and also back in the UK (Red Line Racing – four races, three wins, two fastest laps) where he alternated with Danny Watts.

In 2007 with HISAQ Competition, Westbrook won his second Porsche Supercup title in a row, with wins in Spain and Hungary, along with five other podium finishes and fastest laps. He again competed in Carrera Cup Deutschland, finishing second in the championship for ARAXA Racing (five wins, one pole position, four fastest laps). In the same year, he made his debut in the Le Mans Series in a GT2 Porsche for James Watt Automotive and in the Rolex Sports Car Series at Daytona and Watkins Glen with Synergy Racing in a Porsche GT3 Cup Car.

2008 – see next chapter 'Porsche Factory Driver'.

In 2009, Westbrook drove for VICI Racing (T-Mobile VICI Racing) in the American Le Mans Series (including the Sebring 12h) and for Prospeed Competition in the FIA GT Championship. In his first ALMS race of the year, he finished fourth at Long Beach, alongside Johannes Stuck. However, it was in the FIA GT Championship where he would achieve his biggest success, winning the GT2 class overall after victories at Silverstone (UK), Adria (Italy), Hungaroring (Hungary) and Zolder (Belgium) backed up by second places in Algarve (Portugal) and Paul Ricard (France), in a Porsche 911 GT3 RSR (997). In the same year he also made appearances in International GT Open, ADAC GT Masters, Rolex Sports Car Series (including the Daytona 24h – 15th), Porsche Carrera Cup Deutschland, Porsche Supercup, and Belgian GT.

In 2010, Westbrook made his debut in the 24 Hours of Le Mans in the GT2 class, driving a Porsche 997 GT3-RSR for BMS Scuderia Italia alongside Marco Holzer and Timo Scheider; the trio finished 14th overall and third in class (GT2). He also competed in three further 'twice round the clock' events, the 24 Hours of Spa (Prospeed Competition), the 24 Hours of Nurburgring (Haribo Team Manthey), and the 24 Hours of Daytona where he finished third overall in the Crown Royal/NPN Racing BMW Riley alongside Ryan Hunter-Reay, Lucas Luhr, and Scott Tucker.

There were also outings for Westbrook in the Le Mans Series for Prospeed Competition, but it was his stand-out star performances in a Matech Ford GT1 during the final six rounds of the 2010 FIA GT1 World Championship that would turn heads, taking three podiums alongside Thomas Mutsch.

Westbrook also took part in the British GT Championship in 2010 (three podiums, one pole position, one fastest lap), helping Trackspeed team owner/racer David Ashburn to the title that year.

=== Porsche factory driver (2008–2009) ===
After multiple successes in Porsches, Westbrook signed with the German marque to become the first British Porsche factory driver since Derek Bell in the 1980s. He competed in a global programme that included the FIA GT Championship (Prospeed Competition), Le Mans Series (Farnbacher Racing) and American Le Mans Series (Farnbacher Loles Motorsport). He was the only driver to win at least one race in all three categories. He also competed in three 24-hour races; Spa 24h (Prospeed Competition – GT2 – sixth), Daytona 24h (TRG – GT – second) and the Dubai 24 Hours (Proton Competition – A6)

== Corvette factory driver (2011–2015) ==
Following nine successful years racing predominantly in Porsches, in 2011, Westbrook joined Corvette Racing as the third driver in the No. 4 Compuware Corvette C6.R. Westbrook and his co-drivers Jan Magnussen and fellow Brit Oliver Gavin posted fourth-place finishes in 2011 in Sebring and Road Atlanta, and they were leading at Le Mans at the 16-hour mark when the car was involved in an accident and subsequently retired.

Westbrook had a second year in that role for 2012, teamed with young American driver Tommy Milner and again with Oliver Gavin in the major American Le Mans Series endurance events: Sebring 12-hour, Le Mans 24 Hours, and 1000-mile Petit Le Mans. Also in 2012, he received a new challenge, a full-season in the Rolex Sports Car Series in Spirit of Daytona Racing's all new Corvette Coyote DP alongside Spaniard, Antonio García. The pair took three wins and one further podium, with Westbrook securing three pole-positions too.

The 2013 season saw Westbrook take part in the final year of the Rolex Sports Car Series again with the Spirit of Daytona Racing team in the Corvette Coyote DP. He drove alongside Ricky Taylor and the pair were regulars in the top-five, taking a podium (third place) at The Barber Motorsports Park, round three. In addition he again was drafted into the Corvette Racing squad for the American Le Mans Series and Le Mans 24 Hours, taking an impressive win in the 12 Hours of Sebring with the No. 4 Corvette also driven by Oliver Gavin, and Tommy Milner. This was Corvette Racing's first Sebring class victory since 2009. It was a perfect way to celebrate Corvette's 60th Anniversary and pay tribute to their first Sebring class victory in 1956.

In 2014, Westbrook clinched third in the inaugural United SportsCar Championship in the USA; his third season with the Spirit of Daytona Racing team. Joining Westbrook and the team for 2014 was Canadian driver Michael Valiante, with DTM Champion and Le Mans Winner Mike Rockenfeller joining the pair for the longer races. At the first race of the year, the 2014 Rolex 24 Hours of Daytona race he, Valiante and Rockenfeller led, before being hit with technical issues in the Spirit of Daytona Corvette Daytona Prototype, but the trio hung on to finish fourth on the road.

Westbrook and Valiante took one win in 2014, at the Sahlen 6 Hours, at Watkins Glen International (28/29 June), but a mid-season hot-streak saw them rise up the standings and challenge for the overall title. Contact by a GTD Audi at the season finale, ended his hopes of becoming the Vice-Champion in the series, but he, Mike and Michael finished seventh at the flag to secure third.

In June 2014, Westbrook joined up with Corvette Racing in the new for 2014 No. 74 Corvette C.7.R. to attempt to win the 2014 24 Hours of Le Mans. Despite being an early class leader, technical issues ruled him and co-drivers Tommy Milner and Oliver Gavin out of contention for the race win. The trio lost eight laps due to a slipped alternator belt and gearbox leak, but completed the race to take fourth in the GTE PRO category.

== Ford factory driver (2016–2019) ==
Westbrook would join Chip Ganassi Racing for the full 2016 WeatherTech SportsCar Championship season driving the new Ford GT with Ryan Briscoe, Joey Hand and Dirk Müller.

== Other series (2011–2018) ==
While in his first year of Corvette duty in 2011, Westbrook also competed in the now defunct FIA GT1 championship with a Nissan GT-R GT1 prepared by JR Motorsports team, finishing ninth in championship (two podiums, one pole position). He was chosen off the back of his strong performances in the Matech GT1 Ford the year before. In the same year, he also took part in the newly formed Blancpain Endurance Series in the final two races (Magny-Cours and Silverstone) for JR Motorsports in a Nissan GT-R GT3, and competed in the 24 Hours of Spa for Haribo Team Manthey in a Pro-AM Porsche 997 GT3-R. he also drove with his friend David Ashburn in the British GT Championship when available, almost helping Ashburn successfully defend his title, taking two wins, three podiums, two pole positions, and two fastest laps along the way.

At the end of 2011, Westbrook raced in Australia at the Armor All Gold Coast 600 in Queensland alongside local hero Todd Kelly in the Jack Daniel's Holden Commodore. He finished both of the races in the unique 600-kilometre event, finishing thirteenth and ninth.

Alongside his busy US commitments, in 2012 Westbrook again competed in several European series. Namely British GT (Trackspeed with David Ashburn – one win, two podiums, two pole positions, one fastest lap), the Blancpain Endurance Series (Monza and Nurburgring) for the Haribo Racing Team. He also competed in the Nürburgring 24h for the Haribo Racing Team.

In 2013, Westbrook also combined his racing in the US with another part-season in British GT for Trackspeed with Gregor Fisken, taking a dominant win at Rockingham Motor Speedway and staging an impressive fightback after his teammates' opening stint to finish third at the season finale Donington Park – this saw him also awarded the Mobil Service Centre Driver of the Day award.

In 2014, Westbrook was scheduled to again compete in the Nurburgring 24 Hours with Haribo Team Manthey, but an opportunity arose to join an all PRO line-up with Nicki Thiim, Marco Seefried and Alex Müller in the no.9 Prosperia-Abt Audi R8 LMS Ultra GT3, a car he'd driven a few weeks prior in VLN 4. The car failed to make the finish of the 24-hour race due to technical difficulties.

== Hypercar (2021–2024) ==
In 2021, Westbrook was among the seven drivers Glickenhaus Racing signed for the debut of the FIA World Endurance Championship's Hypercar class. Westbrook finished third overall at the 2022 24 Hours of Le Mans in the Glickenhaus SCG 007 LMH he shared with Ryan Briscoe and Franck Mailleux.

With the entrance of Cadillac Racing into the Le Mans Hypercar category in 2023, Westbrook would partner Earl Bamber and Alex Lynn in the FIA World Endurance Championship, driving a Cadillac V-Series.R. The start of the campaign proved difficult, as Westbrook collided with the No. 88 Proton Competition car in Free Practice 2 at the 1000 Miles of Sebring, leaving the Porsche damaged beyond repair and forcing them to withdraw from the event. Westbrook bounced back with another overall podium at Le Mans, but was dropped at the end of the year.

In 2024, Westbrook moved to the IMSA SportsCar Championship's GTP class with his former DPi team JDC–Miller MotorSports, now running a customer Porsche 963. He and teammate Tijmen van der Helm finished 10th in the championship with a podium. On 15 October 2024, Westbrook announced his retirement from motorsport at the age of 49. He subsequently took on the role of team advisor at JDC.

== Racing record ==
=== Complete Porsche Supercup results ===
(key) (Races in bold indicate pole position – 2 points awarded 2008 onwards in all races) (Races in italics indicate fastest lap)

Year	Team	Car	1	2	3	4	5	6	7	8	9	10	11	12	13	DC	Points
2002	Kadach Tuning	Porsche 996 GT3	ITA; 8	ESP; Ret	AUT; 6	MON; 14	GER; Ret	GBR; Ret	GER; 8	HUN; 14	BEL	ITA	USA	USA		15th	40
2003	Porsche Cars Great Britain	Porsche 996 GT3	ITA	ESP	AUT	MON	GER	FRA	GBR; 9	GER	HUN	ITA	USA	USA		NC‡	0‡
2005	Walter Lechner Racing	Porsche 997 GT3	ITA; 2	ESP; 5	MON; 4	GER; 5	USA; 11	USA; Ret	FRA	GBR; 7	GER	HUN; Ret	ITA; 7	BEL; 7		9th	95
2006	Morellato Racing Team PZ Essen	Porsche 997 GT3	BHR; 2	**ITA**; 1	**GER**; 1	ESP; 3	MON; 3	GBR; 2	**USA**; 1	**USA**; 1	FRA; 4	GER; 3	HUN; 3	ITA; 2		**1st**	**212**
2007	HISAQ Competition	Porsche 997 GT3	BHR; 4	BHR; 2	ESP; 1	MON; 3	FRA; 3	GBR; 18	GER; 3	HUN; 1	TUR; 4	ITA; 2	BEL; 6			**1st**	**169**
2009	Federsand-Jetstream Motorsport	Porsche 997 GT3	BHR; 10	BHR; 3	ESP; 1	**MON**; 1	TUR; 4	GBR	GER	HUN	ESP	BEL	ITA			9th	78
2009	Porsche Cars Great Britain	Porsche 997 GT3												UAE; 14‡	UAE; 3‡	9th	78

‡ – Guest driver – Not eligible for points.

=== 24 Hours of Daytona results ===
Year	Team	Co-drivers	Car	Class	Laps	Pos.	Class pos.
2007	(United States) Synergy Racing	(United States) Steve Johnson (Austria) Richard Lietz (Netherlands) Patrick Huisman	Porsche 997 GT3 Cup	GT	590	27th	11th
2008	(United States) TRG	(United States) Bryce Miller (United States) Ted Ballou (United States) Andy Lally	Porsche 997 GT3 Cup	GT	657	10th	**2nd**
2009	(United States) TRG	(United States) Steve Johnson (Canada) Dave Lacey (United Kingdom) Robert Nearn (United States) James Sofronas	Porsche 997 GT3 Cup	GT	680	15th	7th
2009	(United States) TRG	(United States) Leh Keen (Germany) Dirk Werner (Germany) Wolf Henzler	Porsche 997 GT3 Cup	GT	676	16th	8th
2010	(United States) Crown Royal/NPN Racing	(France) Christophe Bouchut (United States) Ryan Hunter-Reay (Germany) Lucas Luhr (United States) Scott Tucker	Riley Mk. XI-BMW	DP	751	**3rd**	**3rd**
2011	(United States) Level 5 Motorsports	(United States) Scott Tucker (United States) Ryan Hunter-Reay (Brazil) Raphael Matos	Riley Mk. XX-BMW	DP	703	11th	11th
2012	(United States) Spirit of Daytona Racing	(Spain) Antonio García (United Kingdom) Oliver Gavin (Denmark) Jan Magnussen	Coyote Corvette DP	DP	746	8th	8th
2013	(United States) Spirit of Daytona Racing	(Spain) Antonio García (United Kingdom) Oliver Gavin (United States) Ricky Taylor	Coyote Corvette DP	DP	697	5th	5th
2014	(United States) Spirit of Daytona Racing	(Canada) Michael Valiante (Germany) Mike Rockenfeller	Coyote Corvette DP	P	693	4th	4th
2015	(United States) VisitFlorida.com Racing	(Canada) Michael Valiante (Germany) Mike Rockenfeller	Coyote Corvette DP	P	734	**3rd**	**3rd**
2017	(United States) Ford Chip Ganassi Racing	(Australia) Ryan Briscoe (New Zealand) Scott Dixon	Ford GT	GTLM	624	27th	10th
2018	(United States) Ford Chip Ganassi Racing	(Australia) Ryan Briscoe (New Zealand) Scott Dixon	Ford GT	GTLM	783	11th	**1st**
2019	(United States) Ford Chip Ganassi Racing	(Australia) Ryan Briscoe (New Zealand) Scott Dixon	Ford GT	GTLM	570	13th	4th
2021	(United Kingdom) TF Sport	(Republic of Ireland) Charlie Eastwood (United States) Ben Keating (United States) Max Root	Aston Martin Vantage AMR GT3	GTD	744	28th	7th
2022	(United States) JDC-Miller MotorSports	(France) Loïc Duval (United States) Ben Keating (France) Tristan Vautier	Cadillac DPI-V.R	DPi	761	**3rd**	**3rd**

=== Complete Rolex Sports Car Series results ===
(key) (Races in bold indicate pole position) (Races in italics indicate fastest lap)

Year	Team	Class	Make	Engine	1	2	3	4	5	6	7	8	9	10	11	12	13	Rank	Points	Ref
2007	Synergy Racing	GT	Porsche 997 GT3 Cup	Porsche 3.6L Flat-6	DAY; 11	MEX	HOM	VIR	MTY	LRP	WGL; 4	MOH	DAY	IOW	BAR	MON	MIL	55th	48	
2008	The Racer's Group	GT	Porsche 997 GT3 Cup	Porsche 3.6L Flat-6	DAY; 2	MIA	MEX	VIR	LGA	LRP	WGL; 11	MID	DAY					54th	52	
2008	Farnbacher Loles Motorsports	GT	Porsche 997 GT3 Cup	Porsche 3.6L Flat-6										BAR; 19	MON	NJ	MIL	54th	52	
2009	Farnbacher-Loles Racing	GT	Porsche 997 GT3 Cup	Porsche 3.6L Flat-6	R24; 7	VIR	NJ	LAG	S6H	LEX	DAY	BAR	WGI	MON	MIL	HOM		62nd	24	
2010	Level 5 Motorsports	DP	Riley Mk. XX	BMW 5.0L V8	R24; 3	HOM	BIR	VIR	LRP	S6H	LEX	DAY	NJ	WAT	MON	SLK		31st	30	
2011	Level 5 Motorsports	DP	Riley Mk. XX	BMW 5.0L V8	R24; 11	HOM	BIR	VIR	LIM	S6H	ELK	LAG	NJ	WAT	MON	LEX		33rd	20	
2012	Spirit of Daytona Racing	DP	Corvette DP (Coyote CPM)	Chevrolet 5.0L V8	R24; 8	**BIR**; **1**	HOM; 5	NJ; 5	BEL; 9	LEX; 1	ELK; 8	S6H; 5	IMS; 9	WAT; 9†	MON; 9†	**LGA**; **1**	**LIM**; **2**	10th	305	
2013	Spirit of Daytona Racing	DP	Corvette DP (Coyote)	Chevrolet 5.0L V8	R24; 5	TXS; 11	BIR; 3	ATL; 5	BEL; 5	LEX; 9	S6H; 9	IMS; 6	ELK; 13	KAN; 12	**LGA**; **8**	LIM; 9		7th	279	

<sup>†</sup> Westbrook did not complete sufficient laps in order to score full points.

=== Complete American Le Mans Series results ===
(key) (Races in bold indicate pole position; results in italics indicate fastest lap)

Year	Team	Class	Make	Engine	1	2	3	4	5	6	7	8	9	10	11	12	Pos.	Points	Ref
2008	Farnbacher-Loles Motorsports	GT2	Porsche 911 GT3 RSR	Porsche 4.0 L Flat-6	SEB	STP	LBH	UTA	LRP; 2	MOH; 4	ELK; 1	MOS	DET	PET	LAG		15th	51	
2009	T-Mobile VICI Racing	GT2	Porsche 911 GT3 RSR	Porsche 4.0 L Flat-6	SEB	STP	LBH; 4	UTA	LRP; 5	MOH	ELK	MOS	PET	LAG; 7			26th	27	
2011	Corvette Racing	GT	Chevrolet Corvette C6.R	Chevrolet 5.5 L V8	SEB; 4	LBH	LRP	MOS	MOH	ELK	BAL	LAG	PET; 4				NC	0	
2012	Corvette Racing	GT	Chevrolet Corvette C6.R	Chevrolet 5.5 L V8	SEB; 3	LBH	LAG	LRP	MOS	MOH	ELK	BAL	VIR	PET; 12			19th	17	
2013	Corvette Racing	GT	Chevrolet Corvette C6.R	Chevrolet 5.5 L V8	SEB; 1	LBH	LAG	LRP	MOS	ELK	BAL	COA	VIR	PET; 10			18th	29	

=== Complete FIA GT Championship results ===
(key) (Races in bold indicate pole position) (Races in italics indicate fastest lap)

Year	Team	Car	Class	1	2	3	4	5	6	7	8	9	10	11	12	13	Pos.	Pts
2008	Prospeed Competition	Porsche 911 GT3 RSR	GT2	SIL; DSQ	MON; 1	ADR; DSQ	OSC; 4	SPA; 6H; 3	SPA; 12H; 2	SPA; 24H; 2	BUC; R1; 3	BUC; R2; 3	BRN; Ret	NOG; 1	ZOL; 4	SAN; Ret	3rd	51
2009	Prospeed Competition	Porsche 911 GT3 RSR	GT2	SIL; 1	ADR; 1	OSC; Ret	SPA; DSQ	BUD; 1	ALG; 2	PAU; 2	ZOL; 1						1st	56

=== Complete GT1 World Championship results ===
Year	Team	Car	1	2	3	4	5	6	7	8	9	10	11	12	13	14	15	16	17	18	19	20	Pos	Points
2010	Matech Competition	Ford GT1	ABU; QR	ABU; CR	SIL; QR	SIL; CR	BRN; QR	BRN; CR	PRI; QR	PRI; CR	SPA; QR; 6	SPA; CR; 3	NÜR; QR; 6	NÜR; CR; 13	ALG; QR; 5	ALG; CR; 2	NAV; QR; 10	NAV; CR; Ret	INT; QR; Ret	INT; CR; 14	SAN; QR; 2	SAN; CR; 2	13th	57
2011	JR Motorsports	Nissan GT-R GT1	ABU; QR; 2	ABU; CR; 2	ZOL; QR; Ret	ZOL; CR; Ret	ALG; QR; 1	ALG; CR; 12	SAC; QR; 6	SAC; CR; 7	SIL; QR; Ret	SIL; CR; Ret	NAV; QR; 7	NAV; CR; 9	PRI; QR; 4	PRI; CR; Ret	ORD; QR; 2	ORD; CR; 2	BEI; QR; 7	BEI; CR; 7	SAN; QR; NC	SAN; CR; 8	9th	78

=== Complete 24 Hours of Le Mans results ===
Year	Team	Co-drivers	Car	Class	Laps	Pos.	Class pos.
2010	(Italy) BMS Scuderia Italia	(Germany) Marco Holzer (Germany) Timo Scheider	Porsche 997 GT3-RSR	GT2	327	14th	**3rd**
2011	(United States) Corvette Racing	(United Kingdom) Oliver Gavin (Denmark) Jan Magnussen	Chevrolet Corvette C6.R	GTE; Pro	211	DNF	DNF
2012	(United States) Corvette Racing	(United Kingdom) Oliver Gavin (United States) Tommy Milner	Chevrolet Corvette C6.R	GTE; Pro	215	NC	NC
2013	(United States) Corvette Racing	(United Kingdom) Oliver Gavin (United States) Tommy Milner	Chevrolet Corvette C6.R	GTE; Pro	309	22nd	7th
2014	(United States) Corvette Racing	(United Kingdom) Oliver Gavin (United States) Tommy Milner	Chevrolet Corvette C7.R	GTE; Pro	333	20th	4th
2016	(United States) Ford Chip Ganassi Team USA	(Australia) Ryan Briscoe (New Zealand) Scott Dixon	Ford GT	GTE; Pro	340	20th	**3rd**
2017	(United States) Ford Chip Ganassi Team USA	(Australia) Ryan Briscoe (New Zealand) Scott Dixon	Ford GT	GTE; Pro	337	24th	7th
2018	(United States) Ford Chip Ganassi Team USA	(Australia) Ryan Briscoe (New Zealand) Scott Dixon	Ford GT	GTE; Pro	309	39th	14th
2019	(United States) Ford Chip Ganassi Team USA	(Australia) Ryan Briscoe (New Zealand) Scott Dixon	Ford GT	GTE; Pro	341	24th	5th
2020	(United Kingdom) Aston Martin Racing	(Denmark) Marco Sørensen (Denmark) Nicki Thiim	Aston Martin Vantage AMR	GTE; Pro	343	22nd	**3rd**
2021	(United States) Glickenhaus Racing	(Australia) Ryan Briscoe (France) Romain Dumas	Glickenhaus SCG 007 LMH	Hypercar	364	5th	5th
2022	(United States) Glickenhaus Racing	(Australia) Ryan Briscoe (France) Franck Mailleux	Glickenhaus SCG 007 LMH	Hypercar	375	**3rd**	**3rd**
2023	(United States) Cadillac Racing	(New Zealand) Earl Bamber (United Kingdom) Alex Lynn	Cadillac V-Series.R	Hypercar	341	**3rd**	**3rd**

=== Complete IMSA SportsCar Championship ===
(key) (Races in bold indicate pole position) (Races in italics indicate fastest lap)

Year	Team	No.	Class	Make	Engine	1	2	3	4	5	6	7	8	9	10	11	12	Rank	Points	Ref
2014	Spirit of Daytona Racing	90	P	Coyote Corvette DP	Chevrolet 5.5 L V8	DAY; 4	SEB; 10	LBH; 5	LGA; 5	**DET**; 2	WGL; 1	MOS; 2	IMS; 3	ELK; 4	COA; 6	PET; 7		3rd	318	
2015	VisitFlorida.com Racing	90	P	Coyote Corvette DP	Chevrolet 5.5 L V8	DAY; 3	SEB; 3	LBH; 3	LGA; 1	DET; 5	WGL; 1	MOS; 4	ELK; 5	COA; 3	**PET**; 5			2nd	306	
2016	Ford Chip Ganassi Racing	67	GTLM	Ford GT	Ford 3.5 L EcoBoost V6	DAY; 9	SEB; 5	LBH; 4	LGA; 1	**WGL**; 1	MOS; 1	**LIM**; 3	ELK; 2	VIR; 4	COA; 9	**PET**; 7		2nd	328	
2017	Ford Chip Ganassi Racing	67	GTLM	Ford GT	Ford EcoBoost 3.5 L Turbo V6	DAY; 10	SEB; 4	LBH; 2	COA; 6	WGL; 2	MOS; 3	LIM; 5	ELK; 3	VIR; 2	LGA; 5	PET; 8		4th	306	
2018	Ford Chip Ganassi Racing	67	GTLM	Ford GT	Ford EcoBoost 3.5 L Turbo V6	DAY; 1	SEB; 4	LBH; 2	MOH; 5	**WGL**; 6	MOS; 1	LIM; 6	ELK; 1	**VIR**; 7	LGA; 6	PET; 5		2nd	316	
2019	Ford Chip Ganassi Racing	67	GTLM	Ford GT	Ford EcoBoost 3.5 L Turbo V6	DAY; 4	SEB; 6	LBH; 6	MOH; 5	WGL; 3	MOS; 5	LIM; 1	ELK; 1	VIR; 5	LGA; 6	PET; 2		4th	313	
2021	TF Sport	97	GTD	Aston Martin Vantage AMR GT3	Aston Martin 4.0 L Turbo V8	DAY; 7	SEB	MOH	DET	WGL	WGL	LIM	ELK	LGA	LBH	VIR	PET	52nd	259	
2022	JDC-Miller MotorSports	5	DPi	Cadillac DPi-V.R	Cadillac 5.5 L V8	DAY; 3	SEB; 2	LBH; 3	LGA; 4	MOH; 6	DET; 5	WGL; 7	MOS; 5	ELK; 5	PET; 7			6th	2979	
2023	Cadillac Racing	02	GTP	Cadillac V-LMDh	Cadillac LMC55R 5. 5 L V8	DAY; 4	SEB	LBH	LGA	WGL	MOS	ELK	IMS	PET				21st	306	
2024	JDC-Miller MotorSports	85	GTP	Porsche 963	Porsche 9RD 4.6 L Turbo V8	DAY; 6	SEB; 11	LBH; 7	LGA; 8	DET; 8	WGL; 9	ELK; 6	IMS; 3	PET; 11				10th	2331	

=== Complete FIA World Endurance Championship results ===
(key) (Races in bold indicate pole position) (Races in italics indicate fastest lap)

Year	Entrant	Class	Car	Engine	1	2	3	4	5	6	7	8	Rank	Points
2019–20	Aston Martin Racing	LMGTE Pro	Aston Martin Vantage AMR	Aston Martin 4.0 L Turbo V8	SIL	FUJ	SHA	BHR	COA	SPA	LMS; 3	BHR; 4	10th	48
2021	Glickenhaus Racing	Hypercar	Glickenhaus SCG 007 LMH	Glickenhaus 3.5 L Turbo V8	SPA	ALG; 4	MNZ; 3	LMS; 5	BHR	BHR			4th	53
2022	Glickenhaus Racing	Hypercar	Glickenhaus SCG 007 LMH	Glickenhaus 3.5 L Turbo V8	SEB	SPA	LMS; 3	MNZ	FUJ	BHR			NC†	0†
2023	Cadillac Racing	Hypercar	Cadillac V-LMDh	Cadillac 5.5 L V8	SEB; 4	ALG; 4	SPA; 5	LMS; 3	MNZ; 10	FUJ; 10	BHR; 11		5th	72

^{†} As Westbrook was a guest driver, he was ineligible to score points.

Sporting positions
Preceded by Josef Neuhauser	Austria Formula 3 Cup; Champion; 1996	Succeeded by Josef Neuhauser
Preceded by Barry Horne	Porsche Carrera Cup GB; Champion; 2004	Succeeded by Damien Faulkner
Preceded by Alessandro Zampedri	Porsche Supercup; Champion; 2006–2007	Succeeded by Jeroen Bleekemolen
Preceded by Gianmaria Bruni; Toni Vilander	FIA GT Championship; GT2 Champion; 2009	Succeeded by None (Class discontinued)
Preceded by Dirk Müller; Joey Hand	Michelin Endurance Cup; GTLM Champion; 2019; With: Ryan Briscoe	Succeeded by Jesse Krohn; John Edwards
