= Zytek ZA1348 engine =

Zytek ZA1348 (ZA348)

Overview
- Manufacturer: Zytek
- Production: 2003-present

Layout
- Configuration: 90° V8 naturally-aspirated
- Displacement: 3.4 L (207 cu in)
- Cylinder block material: Aluminum alloy
- Cylinder head material: Aluminum alloy
- Valvetrain: DOHC

Combustion
- Fuel system: Electronic indirect multi-point injection
- Management: Zytek EMS 4.6.1
- Fuel type: 70% 100-RON racing gasoline + 30% ethanol

Output
- Power output: 520–550 hp (388–410 kW)
- Torque output: 326–330 lb⋅ft (442–447 N⋅m)

Dimensions
- Length: ~ 543 mm (21.4 in)
- Width: ~ 619 mm (24.4 in)
- Height: ~ 542 mm (21.3 in)
- Dry weight: ~ 120 kg (260 lb)

The Zytek ZA1348, also known as the Zytek ZA348, is a 3.4-liter, naturally-aspirated, V8 racing engine, designed, developed and produced by British manufacturer Zytek, between 2003 and 2004. It was specifically constructed and built as the spec-engine for the new A1GP open-wheel formula racing series, and debuted in 2005. It powered the Lola B05/52 A1 Grand Prix car. It produced between 520–550 hp (390–410 kW), and around 330 lb⋅ft (450 N⋅m) of torque. A slightly detuned version of the engine, producing around 400 hp (300 kW), but a similar torque figure of 326 lb⋅ft (442 N⋅m), was used in the Ginetta G50Z sports racing car. The engine itself is very light, weighing only 120 kg (260 lb), constructed out of cast aluminum alloy.

== Applications ==
- Lola B05/52
- Ginetta G50Z
