= David Saelens =

Belgian racing driver (born 1975)

- Nationality: (Belgium) Belgian
- Born: 2 July 1975 (age 51) Ypres, Belgium

Previous series
- 2008 2004–08 2002 2001 2000 1999–2002 1999, 2003 1998 1997–98 1997 1996 1995–96: Porsche Carrera Cup Deutschland; Porsche Supercup; Formula One testing DTM; Belcar; International Formula 3000; American Le Mans Series; French Formula Three; Belgian Procar; British Formula 3 French Formula Renault; Formula Renault Europe

Championship titles
- 1998 1998: French Formula Three; Formula Three Masters

David Saelens (born 2 July 1975 in Ypres, West Flanders) is a racing driver from Belgium. He drove in several racing classes such as Formula Three, International Formula 3000, American Le Mans Series, DTM and most recently the 2018 Porsche Supercup. In 1998, he won the Marlboro Masters of Formula 3 at Zandvoort. That same year, he became the first non-French driver to win the French Formula Three Championship. In 2002, he was a Formula One test driver for Minardi.

== Racing record ==
=== Career summary ===
Season	Series	Team	Races	Wins	Poles	F.Laps	Podiums	Points	Position
1993	24 Hours of Spa	Excelsior	1	0	0	0	0	0	11th
1994	Championnat de France Formule Renault	?	1	0	0	0	0	0	NC
1995	Eurocup Formula Renault	?	?	?	?	?	?	57	9th
1995	Championnat de France Formule Renault	Peka Racing	13	0	0	0	0	21	15th
1996	Eurocup Formula Renault	Mygale	10	0	?	?	4	128	**2nd**
1996	Championnat de France Formule Renault	Peka Racing	14	0	0	0	3	55	9th
1996	24 Hours of Spa	Ecurie Ardennes	1	0	0	0	1	0	**3rd**
1997	French Formula Three Championship	ASM Formule 3	17	2	4	1	8	131	**3rd**
1997	British Formula Three Championship	ASM Formule 3	1	0	0	0	1	15	17th
1997	Macau Grand Prix	ASM Formule 3	1	0	0	0	0	0	NC
1997	Monaco Grand Prix Formula Three	ASM Formule 3	1	0	0	0	0	0	4th
1997	Masters of Formula 3	ASM Formule 3	1	0	0	0	0	0	9th
1997	24 Hours of Spa	BMW Fina Bigazzi	1	0	0	0	0	0	14th
1998	French Formula Three Championship	ASM Formule 3	22	12	12	9	14	229	**1st**
1998	British Formula Three Championship	ASM Formule 3	1	0	0	0	0	0	NC
1998	Macau Grand Prix	ASM Formule 3	1	0	0	0	0	0	NC
1998	Masters of Formula 3	ASM Formule 3	1	1	0	0	1	0	**1st**
1998	24 Hours of Spa	Fina Bastos Racing Team	1	0	0	0	0	0	4th
1998	Belgian Procar Championship	Juma Racing	1	0	0	0	0	28	25th
1999	International Formula 3000	Super Nova Racing	6	0	0	0	1	8	9th
1999	American Le Mans Series	Team Rafanelli SRL	1	0	0	0	0	0	NC
1999	Belgian Procar Championship	BMW Fina-Team Rafanelli	1	0	0	0	0	0	NC
2000	International Formula 3000	Super Nova Racing	10	0	2	0	3	15	6th
2000	Belgian Procar Championship	BMW Fina-Team Rafanelli	1	0	0	0	0	0	NC
2001	International Formula 3000	European Minardi F3000	9	0	0	0	0	10	10th
2001	Deutsche Tourenwagen Masters	Team Rosberg	8	0	0	0	0	4	21st
2002	International Formula 3000	European Minardi F3000	5	0	0	0	0	0	NC
2002	Formula One	KL Minardi Asiatech	Test Driver						
2003	American Le Mans Series	JML Team Panoz	8	0	0	0	6	101	6th
2003	24 Hours of Le Mans	JML Team Panoz	1	0	0	0	0	0	NC
2004	Porsche Supercup	Kadach Racing Team	12	0	0	0	0	114	6th
2004	American Le Mans Series - GT	Panoz Motor Sports	4	0	0	1	0	5	35th
2005	Porsche Supercup	Kadach Racing Team	12	3	5	4	4	145	**3rd**
2006	Porsche Supercup	Kadach Racing Team	11	1	1	0	4	122	5th
2007	Porsche Supercup	Team IRWIN SAS	10	0	0	0	0	96	6th
2008	Porsche Supercup	Team IRWIN SAS	12	0	0	1	0	72	12th
2008	Porsche Carrera Cup Deutschland	Schnabel Engineering	1	0	0	0	0	0	NC
2017	Porsche GT3 Cup Challenge Benelux	Belgium Racing	2	0	0	0	1	38	13th

=== Complete International Formula 3000 results ===
(key) (Races in bold indicate pole position) (Races in italics indicate fastest lap)

Year	Entrant	1	2	3	4	5	6	7	8	9	10	11	12	DC	Points
1999	WRT Fina	IMO; DNQ	MON; DNQ	CAT; DNQ										9th	8
1999	Super Nova Racing				MAG; 3	SIL; 9	A1R; Ret	HOC; 8	HUN; DNQ	SPA; 5	NÜR; 5			9th	8
2000	D2 Playlife Super Nova	IMO; Ret	SIL; 8	CAT; 3	**NÜR**; Ret	**MON**; 3	MAG; 3	A1R; Ret	HOC; 18	HUN; 11	SPA; 4			7th	15
2001	European Minardi F3000	INT; 4	IMO; Ret	CAT; 5	A1R; 9	MON; Ret	NÜR; 4	MAG; 9	SIL; DNS	HOC	HUN	SPA; Ret	MNZ; 5	10th	10
2002	European Minardi F3000	INT; Ret	IMO; Ret	CAT; 16	A1R; Ret	MON; Ret	NÜR	SIL	MAG	HOC	HUN	SPA	MNZ	NC	0

=== Complete Deutsche Tourenwagen Masters results ===
(key) (Races in bold indicate pole position) (Races in italics indicate fastest lap)

Year	Team	Car	1	2	3	4	5	6	7	8	9	10	11	12	13	14	15	16	17	18	19	20	DC	Points
2001	Team Rosberg	AMG Mercedes CLK-DTM	HOC; QR	HOC; CR	NÜR; QR	NÜR; CR	OSC; QR; 19	OSC; CR; 19	SAC; QR; 12	SAC; CR; 11	NOR; QR; 12	NOR; CR; 13	LAU; QR; 16	LAU; CR; 10	NÜR; QR; 13	NÜR; CR; 10	A1R; QR; 10	A1R; CR; Ret	ZAN; QR; 11	ZAN; CR; 9	HOC; QR; 13	HOC; CR; 15	21st	4

=== 24 Hours of Le Mans results ===
Year	Team	Co-Drivers	Car	Class	Laps	Pos.	Class Pos.
2003	(United States) JML Team Panoz	(Switzerland) Benjamin Leuenberger (Canada) Scott Maxwell	Panoz LMP01 Evo	LMP900	233	DNF	DNF

=== Complete Porsche Supercup results ===
(key) (Races in bold indicate pole position) (Races in italics indicate fastest lap)

Year	Team	Car	1	2	3	4	5	6	7	8	9	10	11	12	DC	Points
2004	Kadach Racing	Porsche 996 GT3	ITA; 4	ESP; 7	MON; 7	GER; Ret	USA; 8	USA; 7	FRA; Ret	GBR; 5	GER; 9	HUN; 12	BEL; 5	ITA; 7	6th	114
2005	Kadach Racing	Porsche 997 GT3	**ITA**; 4	ESP; 3	MON; 6	GER; 10	**USA**; 1	**USA**; 1	**FRA**; 5	GBR; 5	GER; 1	HUN; 11	**ITA**; Ret	BEL; Ret	**3rd**	**145**
2006	Kadach Racing	Porsche 997 GT3	**BHR**; 3	ITA; 4	GER; 3	ESP; 1	MON; 2	GBR; 6	USA; 10	USA; Ret	FRA; 5	GER; 13	HUN; Ret	ITA	5th	120
2007	Team IRWIN	Porsche 997 GT3	BHR; 5	BHR; 6	ESP; 14	MON; 8	FRA; 10	GBR; 4	GER; 7	HUN; 17	TUR; Ret	ITA; 4	BEL; 4		6th	96
2008	Team IRWIN	Porsche 997 GT3	BHR; 5	BHR; 9	ESP; 26	TUR; 6	MON; 5	FRA; Ret	GBR; Ret	GER; 8	HUN; 5	ESP; Ret	BEL; 6	ITA; 20	12th	73

=== 24 Hours of Spa results ===
Year	Team	Co-Drivers	Car	Class	Laps	Pos.	Class Pos.
1993	(Belgium) Renstal Excelsior	(Belgium) Albert Vanierschot (Belgium) Michel Maillien	Porsche 911 Carrera 2	Pro GT	290	11th	10th
1996	(Belgium) Ecurie Ardennes	(Belgium) Didier Defourny (Belgium) Kurt Thiers	BMW 318 is	Class 2	485	3rd	1st
1997	(Italy) BMW Fina Team Bigazzi	(France) Alain Ferté (Belgium) Bruno Thiry	BMW M3	Spa 3.0	434	14th	8th
1998	(Belgium) BMW Fina Bastos Team	(France) Alain Ferté (Belgium) Pierre Fermine	BMW 320i	SP	473	4th	4th
1999	(Italy) BMW Fina Rafanelli	(United Kingdom) Jenson Button (Czech Republic) Tomáš Enge	BMW 320i	SP	22	DNF	DNF
2000	(Italy) BMW Fina Rafanelli	(Belgium) Grégoire de Mévius (Germany) Thomas Winkelhock	BMW 320i	SP		DNF	DNF
2002	Racing Team Belgium	(Belgium) Vanina Ickx (Belgium) Renaud Kuppens	Gillet Vertigo Streiff	GTN	350	DNF	DNF

=== 24 Hours of Zolder results ===
Year	Team	Co-Drivers	Car	Class	Laps	Pos.	Class Pos.
2000	(Belgium) G&A Racing	(Belgium) Guino Kenis (Belgium) Mikke Van Hool	BMW M3	TB		DNF	DNF
2006	(Belgium) Accent Racing Team	(Belgium) Philippe Cracco (Belgium) François Duval (Belgium) Frédérique Jonckheere	Porsche 996 GT3 Cup	Class 4		DNF	DNF
2025	(Belgium) Q1-Trackracing	(Belgium) Sam Dejonghe (France) Florian Latorre (Belgium) Nicolas Saelens (Belgium) Lars Zaenen	Porsche 992 GT3 Cup	GT Cup	813	3rd	3rd

Sporting positions
Preceded by Tom Coronel	Formula Three Masters; Winner; 1998	Succeeded by Marc Hynes
Preceded by Patrice Gay	French Formula Three; Champion; 1998	Succeeded by Sébastien Bourdais
