= Alessandro Zampedri =

Italian race car driver (born 1969)

Alessandro Zampedri (born 3 October 1969) is an Italian race car driver from Brescia. He started three Indianapolis 500s (1995, 1996, and 1997).

== Racing career ==
Zampedri started his racing career in the Italian Formula Alfa Boxer Championship, which he won in 1989. In 1990 and 1991, he raced in the Italian Formula 3 Championship with multiple podium finishes. In 1992 and 1993, he competed in the International Formula 3000 Championship with Forti Corse and Nordic Racing, with best result in 1993 with a third place at the Nurburgring. In 1994, he moved to Indycar Championship with Euromotorsport first and then Dale Coyne Racing with best result seventh in Portland. In 1995, Zampedri competed the whole season for Payton Coyne Racing, driving for the football legend Walter Payton, Mi Jack Sponsored car. In 1996 after qualifying seventh for the start of the 1996 Indianapolis 500, and leading the race for 20 laps from lap 170 to lap 190, Zampedri was involved in a crash with Roberto Guerrero and Eliseo Salazar with two laps to go while running in fourth, suffering severe foot and leg injuries. Zampedri's car had become airborne and crashed into the fence at the head of the main straightaway.

Zampedri returned to Indianapolis in 1997, but he retired from the race due to engine failure during the formation laps.

In 1999, Zampedri returned to racing in Europe in the Porsche Supercup and became champion in 2005, taking his only victory in the series at Circuit de Catalunya. He was the first Italian to win the Porsche Championship.

== Racing record ==
=== Complete International Formula 3000 results ===
(key) (Races in bold indicate pole position) (Races in italics indicate fastest lap)

Year	Entrant	1	2	3	4	5	6	7	8	9	10	DC	Points
1992	Forti Corse	SIL; Ret	PAU; Ret	CAT; 11	PER; 5	HOC; 7	NÜR; Ret	SPA; 7	ALB; 8	NOG; 5	MAG; Ret	12th	4
1993	Nordic Racing	DON; Ret	SIL; DSQ	PAU; DNQ	PER; Ret	HOC; Ret	NÜR; 3	SPA; Ret	MAG; Ret	NOG; 10		11th	4

=== American Open Wheel ===
(key)

==== CART ====
Year	Team	1	2	3	4	5	6	7	8	9	10	11	12	13	14	15	16	17	Rank	Points	Ref
1994	Euromotorsport	SRF; 22	PHX	LBH; 22	INDY	MIL													**25th**	**9**	
1994	Coyne						DET; 26	POR; 7	CLE; 10	TOR; 17	MIS; DNS	MDO	NHM	VAN; 28	ROA; 23	NZR; 20	LS; 16		**25th**	**9**	
1995	Payton/Coyne	MIA; 23	SRF; 19	PHX; 19	LBH; 8	NZR; 15	INDY; 11	MIL; 22	DET; 26	POR; 16	ROA; 20	TOR; 23	CLE; 9	MIS; 13	MDO; 14	NHM; 14	VAN; 9	LS; 20	**22nd**	**15**	

==== IndyCar Series ====
Year	Team	1	2	3	4	5	6	7	8	9	10	Rank	Points	Ref
1996	Team Scandia	WDW	PHX	INDY; 4								**28th**	**31**	
1996–97	Team Scandia	NHM	LVS	WDW	PHX	INDY; 35	TXS; 12	PPIR	CLT	NH2	LV2	**39th**	**24**	

=== Partial Porsche Supercup results ===
(key) (Races in bold indicate pole position) (Races in italics indicate fastest lap)

Year	Team	Car	1	2	3	4	5	6	7	8	9	10	11	12	13	DC	Points
2002	PZ Rhein-Oberberg/Jürgen Alzen	Porsche 996 GT3	ITA; 4	ESP; 2	AUT; 9	MON; 4	GER; 8	GBR; 8	GER; Ret	HUN; 5	BEL; 11	ITA; 8	USA; Ret	USA; 11		7th	109
2003	DeWalt Racing/PZRO-JAM	Porsche 996 GT3	ITA; Ret	ESP; 8	AUT; 8	MON; Ret	GER; 16	FRA; 7	GBR; 8	GER; 9	HUN; 3	ITA; Ret	USA; 2	USA; 4		6th	99
2004	DeWalt Racing-PZRO	Porsche 996 GT3	ITA; Ret	ESP; 3	MON; 5	GER; Ret	USA; 12	USA; 6	FRA; Ret	GBR; 6	GER; 12	HUN; Ret	BEL; Ret	ITA; 10		11th	79
2005	Lechner School Racing Team	Porsche 997 GT3	ITA; 8	**ESP**; 1	MON; 3	GER; 2	USA; 2	USA; 2	FRA; 6	**GBR**; 2	GER; 8	HUN; 2	ITA; 3	BEL; Ret		**1st**	**173**
2006	Lechner School Racing Team	Porsche 997 GT3	BHR; 12	ITA; 8	GER; 9	ESP; 9	MON; 7	GBR; 7	USA; Ret	USA; 2	FRA; 6	GER; 4	HUN; 17	ITA; Ret		7th	100
2007	Lechner Racing Bahrain	Porsche 997 GT3	BHR; 3	BHR; 4	ESP; 6	MON; 22	FRA; 4	GBR; 17	GER; 5	HUN; 7	TUR; 7	ITA; Ret	BEL; Ret			7th	90
2008	Lechner Racing Bahrain	Porsche 997 GT3	BHR; 11	BHR; 15	ESP; Ret	TUR; 11	MON; DNS	FRA; 12	GBR; 9	GER; Ret	HUN; 12	ESP; 20†	BEL; 13	ITA; 8		15th	48
2009	Konrad Motorsport	Porsche 997 GT3	BHR	BHR	ESP	MON; 17	TUR	GBR	GER	HUN	ESP	BEL	ITA; 9			NC‡	0‡
2009	SPS Automotive	Porsche 997 GT3												UAE; 13	UAE; 7	NC‡	0‡
2010	Lechner Racing	Porsche 997 GT3	BHR; 9	BHR; 7	ESP; Ret	MON; 5	ESP; 17	GBR; 20†	GER; 11	HUN; Ret	BEL; 12	ITA; 15				14th	46
2011	Team Bleekemolen	Porsche 997 GT3	TUR; Ret	ESP; 13	MON; 8	NNS	GBR; 17	GER; 13	HUN; 8	BEL	ITA; Ret	UAE; Ret	UAE; 8			14th	34
2012	Team Bleekemolen	Porsche 997 GT3	BHR	BHR	MON; 10	ESP; 14	GBR; 14	GER; 11	HUN; Ret	HUN; Ret	BEL	ITA; 12				15th	26
2013	MOMO-Megatron	Porsche 997 GT3	ESP; 16	MON; 23	GBR; 17	GER	HUN; 17	BEL	ITA; 16	UAE	UAE					22nd	3

† — Did not finish the race, but was classified as he completed over 90% of the race distance.

‡ — Not eligible for points.

== See also ==
- The Bowery House

Sporting positions
Preceded by Wolf Henzler	Porsche Supercup champion 2005	Succeeded by Richard Westbrook
