= Oliver Mayer =

Mexican American writer

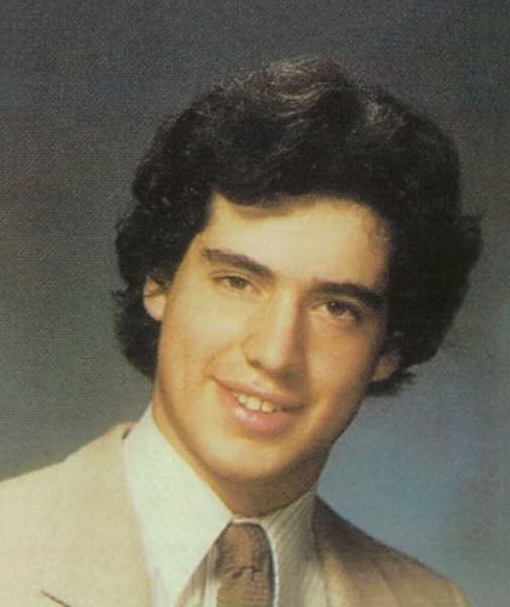
- Mayer in 1982
- Born: Hollywood, California
- Education: Cornell University (BA); Columbia University (MFA)
- Occupations: Playwright, professor, author, essayist, screenwriter, poet, librettist
- Spouse: Marlene Forte (m. 2006)

Oliver Mayer is a Mexican-American playwright, poet, librettist, and tenured professor and Associate Dean of Faculty at the School of Dramatic Arts at USC. In his 30+ plays, he aims to magnify rich, violent, and taboo stories of marginal Americans. Recent works include Blade to the Heat, performed at the AppleTree Theatre in Chicago, starring Stef Tovar, and its sequel Members Only. His newest play, Ghost Waltz (commissioned by the Latino Theatre Company) won Best Play at the 2025 Stage Raw Theatre Awards.

Mayer’s body of work spans titles like Fortune is a Woman, Yerma in the Desert, The Dragon Tree, and Letters from the Black Sea (commissioned by the Getty Villa), The Wallowa Project, Dias y Flores, Dark Matters, Conjunto, Young Valiant, Joy of the Desolate, The Sinner from Toledo, Laws of Sympathy and Ragged Time. Mayer wrote the libretto for the opera America Tropical, composed by David Conte, and the book for Blue House with music and lyrics by Perla Batalla and David Batteau.

He has written essays regularly for Zocalo Public Square, a book of poetry entitled Body Languages, and co-authored a short, illustrated children's book, Big Dog on Campus, along with Patricia Rae. His plays have been produced nationwide at such venues as the Joseph Papp Public Theater, The Mark Taper Forum, and INTAR, and internationally at the Royal Court Theatre, London and the Teatro Lirico, Mexico City. His literary archive is available through Stanford University Libraries.

== Early life and career ==
Oliver Mayer was born in Hollywood, California to Gloria and Alexander A. Mayer. His father, Alexander A. Mayer, worked at Universal Studios as an Art Director for more than two decades, working mostly in TV. Gloria Mayer worked in nursing administration and often encouraged Oliver to pursue a career in dramaturgy as a child. In 1978, at the age of 13, Mayer’s parents took him to see Zoot Suit, a pinnacle moment of inspiration which led him to take up a career in play-writing.

Sensitive and intuitive from a young age, Mayer faced bullying in grade-school, to which his father responded by putting him in boxing classes. His weekly lessons between the ages of 13 and 17 formed most of the inspiration behind his play, Blade to Heat. He went on to study English and vocal music at Cornell University, and spent his junior year abroad at the University of Oxford, where he was inspired to receive a Master of Fine Arts in playwriting from Columbia University.

At the age of 20, Mayer had his first work produced. He then returned to Los Angeles, California after college in 1989. He joined the faculty at the University of Southern California in 2003, and spent seven years interviewing to become a professor with tenure. Oscar nominee playwright and screenwriter Jose Rivera remarked that "Oliver Mayer is one of the few American playwrights showing us today what the theatre of tomorrow can be like."

== Major works ==
=== Ghost Waltz ===
Ghost Waltz is Mayer’s most recent production. It was commissioned by the Latino Theatre Company in 2025 and won Best Play at the Stage Raw Theatre Awards. The Nerds of Color described it as “one of the most magnificent plays I have ever seen,” highlighting its diversity and storytelling”. Stage and Cinema highlighted Mayer’s work as “an enlightening exploration” of Rosas’s life and legacy”.

Developed through the Latino Theater Company’s Circle of Imaginistas Playwriting Group, this original work explores the life of Juventino Rosas, a prominent yet often overlooked Indigenous composer from Mexico. The play traces Rosas’ journey from the early loss of his father to his connection with ragtime composer Scott Joplin. The piece examines the cultural and historical experiences of people of color in the late 19th-century Americas, highlighting their enduring legacy in contemporary life.

=== Yerma in the Desert ===
Yerma in the Desert premiered in LA's Greenway Court Theatre in mid-November 2017. The play centers Yerma, a wife entrapped in a marriage devoid of intimacy, and deals with gender equality and deportation in the professional sector.Yerma in the Desert modernizes Federico Garcia Lorca's play,Yerma, taking place in the academic-sphere at an American University and exploring the complex relationships of custodial staff in present times.

=== Blade to the Heat and Members Only ===
Among Mayer's more notable works, Blade to the Heat, tells the turbulent story of two Latino boxers, Mexican-American and Cuban, played by Pedro Quinn and Mantequilla Decima. Set in the late 1950s, Blade to Heat, addresses sexuality in the world of boxing, as well as tensions in Latinx identity, informed by Mayer's own experiences boxing during his teenage years. In 1944, a George C. Wolfe directed production premiered at the Joseph Papp Public Theatre in New York City. The West Coast premiere took place at the Mark Taper Forum in 1996 in Los Angeles, California, directed by Ron Link and scored by Jackie Wilson. The production’s sequel, Members Only, a work in progress for over six years, premiered October 2018 at the Los Angeles Theatre Center. Set in 1982, it follows the surviving characters of Blade to Heat as they attempt to forge their identities at the onset of the AIDs pandemic.

=== 3 Paderewskis and America Tropical ===
3 Paderewskis was the winner of the 2019 American Prize for Best New Opera. It was commissioned by the Adam Mickiewicz Institute as part of the Paderewski Musical Project, and was composed by Jenni Brandon with Mayer's libretto. The opera follows the life and times of Polish pianist/composer/politician and champion winemaker Ignace Jan Paderewski. We see three versions, parallel lives, of the great Paderewski (one of them female), as they sift through a lifetime of memories. Ignace the pianist/composer, Jan the visionary statesman, and Paderewski the viticulturist assesses a lifetime of love and loss, exile, war and wine. When the ghost of Antonina, their long-departed wife, rejoins them, memories become immediate with a vibrancy that sheds light on the depths of their endless love. 3 Paderewskis received its world premiere at the Kennedy Center in Washington D.C. and was also performed at the Aula Nova in Poznań, Poland.

America Tropical is a one act opera composed by David Conte with Mayer's libretto. It follows the creation and eventual destruction of a Los Angeles mural on Olvera Street, the América Tropical: Oprimida y Destrozada por los Imperialismos by Mexican artist David Alfaro Siqueiros. The opera replays the founding of LA in 1781 and the Rodney King beating in 1991, using the mural as a touch-stone to reflect on Los Angeles' history of race, ethnicity and class discrimination. America Tropical received its world premiere in San Francisco in 2007.
