= Patrick Huisman =

Dutch racing driver (born 1966)

- Huisman at the 2000 24 Hours of Le Mans
- Nationality: (Netherlands) Dutch
- Born: 23 August 1966 (age 60) The Hague, Netherlands
- Relatives: Duncan Huisman (brother)

Porsche Supercup
- Categorisation: FIA Gold (until 2015); FIA Silver (2016–2021); FIA Bronze (2022–)
- Years active: 1997–2011

Previous series
- 1994, 1998–2000 2001–2003: 24 Hours of Le Mans; Deutsche Tourenwagen Masters

Championship titles
- 1997, 1998, 1999, 2000: Porsche Supercup

Patrick Huisman (born 23 August 1966) is a Dutch racing driver. He won the Porsche Supercup one-make sports car series four times between 1997 and 2000, and resulted second in 2005, third in 1996 and 2006, and fourth in 1995, 2003, 2006, 2007, 2008 and 2009. He also got the class win at the 1999 24 Hours of Le Mans and 12 Hours of Sebring driving a Porsche 911. Duncan Huisman is his younger brother.

== Racing record ==
=== 24 Hours of Le Mans results ===
| Year | Team | Co-Drivers | Car | Class | Laps | Pos. | Class Pos. |
|---|---|---|---|---|---|---|---|
| 1994 | (Germany) Konrad Motorsport | (Netherlands) Cor Euser (Slovenia) Matiaz Tomlje | Porsche 911 Carrera RSR | GT2 | 295 | 10th | **3rd** |
| 1998 | (France) Viper Team Oreca | (Austria) Karl Wendlinger (Belgium) Marc Duez | Chrysler Viper GTS-R | GT2 | 28 | DNF | DNF |
| 1999 | (Germany) Manthey Racing GmbH | (Germany) Uwe Alzen (Italy) Luca Riccitelli | Porsche 911 GT3-R | GT | 317 | 13th | **1st** |
| 2000 | (France) Viper Team Oreca | (United States) Tommy Archer (Belgium) Marc Duez | Chrysler Viper GTS-R | GTS | 324 | 12th | 5th |

=== Complete Deutsche Tourenwagen Masters results ===
(key) (Races in bold indicate pole position) (Races in italics indicate fastest lap)

| Year | Team | Car | 1 | 2 | 3 | 4 | 5 | 6 | 7 | 8 | 9 | 10 | 11 | 12 | 13 | 14 | 15 | 16 | 17 | 18 | 19 | 20 | DC | Points |
|---|---|---|---|---|---|---|---|---|---|---|---|---|---|---|---|---|---|---|---|---|---|---|---|---|
| 2001 | Manthey Racing | AMG-Mercedes CLK-DTM 2001 | HOC; QR; 16 | HOC; CR; Ret | NÜR; QR; 12 | NÜR; CR; 7 | OSC; QR; 7 | OSC; CR; 9 | SAC; QR; 5 | SAC; CR; 3 | NOR; QR; Ret | NOR; CR; 7 | LAU; QR; Ret | LAU; CR; 5 | NÜR; QR; 10 | NÜR; CR; 3 | A1R; QR; 12 | A1R; CR; 5 | ZAN; QR; 4 | ZAN; CR; 4 | HOC; QR; 1 | **HOC**; **CR**; 18 | 6th | 63 |
| 2002 | Manthey Racing | AMG Mercedes CLK-DTM 2001 | HOC; QR; 20 | HOC; CR; 12 | ZOL; QR; 7 | ZOL; CR; 12 | DON; QR; 16 | DON; CR; 7 | SAC; QR; 20 | SAC; CR; 14 | NOR; QR; Ret | NOR; CR; 10 | LAU; QR; 15 | LAU; CR; 12 | NÜR; QR; 14 | NÜR; CR; 18 | A1R; QR; 17 | A1R; CR; 12 | ZAN; QR; 13 | ZAN; CR; 16 | HOC; QR; 17† | HOC; CR; Ret | 16th | 0 |
| 2003 | Team Rosberg | AMG-Mercedes CLK-DTM 2002 | HOC; 13 | ADR; Ret | NÜR | LAU | NOR | DON | NÜR | A1R | ZAN | HOC | | | | | | | | | | | 21st | 0 |

- † — Retired, but was classified as he completed 90% of the winner's race distance.

=== Partial Porsche Supercup results ===
(key) (Races in bold indicate pole position) (Races in italics indicate fastest lap)

| Year | Team | Car | 1 | 2 | 3 | 4 | 5 | 6 | 7 | 8 | 9 | 10 | 11 | 12 | 13 | DC | Points |
|---|---|---|---|---|---|---|---|---|---|---|---|---|---|---|---|---|---|
| 2002 | Porsche AG | Porsche 996 GT3 | ITA | ESP | AUT | MON | GER | GBR | GER | HUN | BEL; Ret | ITA | USA | USA | | 15th | 40 |
| 2003 | DeWalt Racing/PZRO-JAM | Porsche 996 GT3 | ITA; 3 | ESP; 19 | AUT; 7 | MON; 4 | GER; 8 | FRA; 3 | **GBR**; Ret | GER; 3 | HUN; 4 | ITA; DSQ | **USA**; 1 | USA; 3 | | 4th | 138 |
| 2004 | Jürgen Alzen Motorsport | Porsche 996 GT3 | ITA; 9 | ESP; 13 | MON; 4 | GER; 9 | USA; 5 | USA; 8 | FRA; 6 | GBR; 7 | GER; 16 | HUN; Ret | BEL; 6 | ITA; 4 | | 5th | 117 |
| 2005 | Walter Lechner Racing | Porsche 997 GT3 | ITA; 3 | ESP; 2 | **MON**; 1 | GER; 4 | USA; 3 | USA; Ret | FRA; Ret | GBR; 1 | GER; Ret | **HUN**; 1 | ITA; 1 | BEL; 2 | | **2nd** | **166** |
| 2006 | Walter Lechner Racing | Porsche 997 GT3 | BHR; 5 | ITA; 7 | GER; 5 | ESP; 7 | MON; 6 | GBR; 5 | USA; Ret | USA; 3 | FRA; 3 | GER; 9 | **HUN**; 1 | ITA; 3 | | 4th | 144 |
| 2007 | Konrad Motorsport | Porsche 997 GT3 | BHR; 8 | BHR; Ret | **ESP**; 2 | MON; 2 | FRA; 7 | GBR; 2 | GER; 12 | HUN; Ret | TUR; 14 | ITA; 12 | BEL; 1 | | | 4th | 107 |
| 2008 | IRWIN Racing | Porsche 997 GT3 | BHR; 7 | BHR; 13 | ESP; 8 | TUR; 9 | MON; 6 | FRA; 4 | GBR; Ret | GER; 9 | HUN; 3 | ESP; 7 | BEL; 5 | ITA; 17 | | 4th | 98 |
| 2009 | SPS Automotive | Porsche 997 GT3 | BHR; 2 | BHR; 4 | ESP; 5 | MON; 9 | TUR; 7 | GBR; 4 | GER; 4 | HUN; 11 | ESP; 4 | BEL; 9 | ITA; 6 | UAE; 7 | UAE; 12 | 4th | 148 |
| 2010 | Konrad Motorsport | Porsche 997 GT3 | BHR; 19 | BHR; 12 | ESP; 2 | MON; 7 | ESP; 7 | GBR; 3 | GER; 10 | HUN; 7 | BEL; 24 | ITA; 9 | | | | 9th | 82 |
| 2011 | Team Bleekemolen | Porsche 997 GT3 | TUR; 9 | ESP; 10 | MON; 11 | NNS; 7 | GBR; 9 | GER; 7 | HUN; 15 | BEL; 11 | ITA; 7 | UAE; 9 | UAE; 9 | | | 10th | 76 |

=== Complete WeatherTech SportsCar Championship results ===
(key) (Races in bold indicate pole position; results in italics indicate fastest lap)

| Year | Team | Class | Make | Engine | 1 | 2 | 3 | 4 | 5 | 6 | 7 | 8 | 9 | 10 | 11 | Rank | Points |
|---|---|---|---|---|---|---|---|---|---|---|---|---|---|---|---|---|---|
| 2014 | GB Autosport | GTD | Porsche 911 GT America | Porsche 4.0 L Flat-6 | DAY; 25† | SEB | LGA | DET | WGL | MOS | IND | ELK | VIR | COA | PET | 132nd | 1 |
| 2016 | Frikadelli Racing | GTD | Porsche 911 GT3 R | Porsche 4.0L Flat-6 | DAY; 12 | SEB | LGA | BEL | WGL | MOS | LIM | ELK | VIR | AUS | PET | 53rd | 20 |

^{†} Huisman did not complete sufficient laps in order to score full points.

Sporting positions
| Preceded by Paul van Splunteren | DPCC champion 2000cc 1991 | Succeeded by Tom Coronel |
| Preceded by Emmanuel Collard | Porsche Supercup champion 1997-1998-1999-2000 | Succeeded by Jörg Bergmeister |
| Preceded by Michael Bartels | Guia Race winner 2000 | Succeeded by Duncan Huisman |
