= Lechner Racing =

(Austria) Lechner Racing
- Founded: 1975
- Founder(s): Walter Lechner
- Base: Faistenau, Austria
- Team principal(s): Robert Lechner; Walter Lechner Jr.
- Current series: Porsche Supercup; Porsche GT3 Middle East Championship; Porsche Carrera Cup France; International GT Open
- Former series: World Sportscar Championship; Eurocup Formula Renault 2.0; GT4 European Series; German Formula Three Championship; Italian F4 Championship; ADAC Formula 4 Porsche Carrera Cup Germany
- Teams' Championships: Porsche Supercup; 2005 2010 2011 2012 2014 2015 2016 2017 2018 2019 2020 2022 2023; Porsche Carrera Cup Germany; 2014 2018 2019; Porsche Carrera Cup France; 2020
- Drivers' Championships: Porsche Supercup; 2005: Alessandro Zampedri; 2010: René Rast; 2011: René Rast; 2012: René Rast; 2014: Earl Bamber; 2015: Philipp Eng; 2016: Sven Müller; 2017: Michael Ammermüller; 2018: Michael Ammermüller; 2019: Michael Ammermüller; 2019: Dylan Pereira; 2023: Bastian Buus; 2018: Thomas Preining; 2019: Julien Andlauer; Porsche Carrera Cup France; 2020: Jaxon Evans

Lechner Racing, formerly known as Walter Lechner Racing is an auto racing team based in Austria. It is also known as the Lechner Racing School. Lechner Racing has established the Porsche Sprint Challenge Middle East and organizes the series as a subcontractor of Porsche AG.

== History ==
=== Sports car racing ===
Walter Lechner Racing competed in the Interserie in the 1990s and developed their own car in conjunction with Reynard Motorsport, the Lechner Spyder SC91. Since then, the team has actively competed in the Porsche Supercup series since 2003. They won their first Teams' Championship title in 2005 and two more followed in 2007 and 2008. In 2005, the team won both trophies as Alessandro Zampedri collected the Drivers' Championship with a win at the Circuit de Catalunya. Drivers such as Richard Westbrook, Damien Faulkner, Danny Watts and Patrick Huisman have also driven for the team over the years and were successful, winning many races. In 2009 the team failed to win a race, although Štefan Rosina came in third place in the overall drivers' standings. Furthermore, in 2011 Lechner Racing achieved a great success by claiming Double Pole and Double Podium during the Porsche Carrera World Cup with more than 100 cars participating. Since 2009, Lechner Racing is to appointed contractor of the Porsche AG to organize the Porsche GT3 Cup Challenge Middle East which is running in Bahrain, Abu Dhabi, Dubai, Qatar and Saudi Arabia.

== Former Series Results ==
=== ADAC Formula 4 ===
Year	Car	Drivers	Races	Wins	Poles	F/Laps	Podiums	Points	D.C.	T.C.
2015	Tatuus F4-T014	(Austria) Florian Janits	12	0	0	0	0	0	37th	N/A
2015	Tatuus F4-T014	(Germany) Kevin Kratz	6	0	0	0	0	0	50th	N/A
2015	Tatuus F4-T014	(Germany) Marcel Lenerz	6	0	0	0	0	0	35th	N/A
2015	Tatuus F4-T014	(Austria) Max Hofer	3	0	0	0	0	0	51st	N/A
2016	Tatuus F4-T014	(Switzerland) Yannik Brandt	23	0	0	0	0	0	32nd	5th
2016	Tatuus F4-T014	(Austria) Thomas Preining	24	2	2	0	6	180.5	4th	5th
2016	Tatuus F4-T014	(Germany) Michael Waldeherr	18	0	0	0	0	28	16th†	5th
2016	Tatuus F4-T014	(Switzerland) Marylin Niederhauser	8	0	0	0	0	0	45th	5th
2017	Tatuus F4-T014	(Germany) Richard Wagner	21	0	0	0	0	0	25th	8th
2017	Tatuus F4-T014	(Austria) Mick Wishofer	21	0	0	0	0	1	23rd	8th
2017	Tatuus F4-T014	(Russia) Artem Petrov	10	1	0	0	2	56	15th†	8th

† Shared results with other Team

=== Italian F4 Championship ===
Year	Car	Drivers	Races	Wins	Poles	F/Laps	Podiums	Points	D.C.	T.C.
2016	Tatuus F4-T014	(Switzerland) Yannik Brandt	2	0	0	0	0	0	42nd	NC
2016	Tatuus F4-T014	(Austria) Thomas Preining	3	0	0	0	0	0	37th	NC

== Timeline ==
Current series
Porsche Supercup	2003–present
Porsche Sprint Challenge Middle East	2009–present
Porsche Carrera Cup France	2020–present
Former series
German Formula Three Championship	1978–1979, 1981–1986, 1988–1989
World Sportscar Championship	1987–1989
Formula Renault 2000 Eurocup	2000–2001
Porsche Carrera Cup Germany	2004, 2009, 2012, 2014–2016, 2018–2019
International GT Open	2013–2018, 2020–2021
GT4 European Series	2014, 2018
ADAC Formula 4	2015–2017
Italian Formula 4 Championship	2016
Intercontinental GT Challenge	2020
