= Fabrice Walfisch =

French racing driver (born 1973)

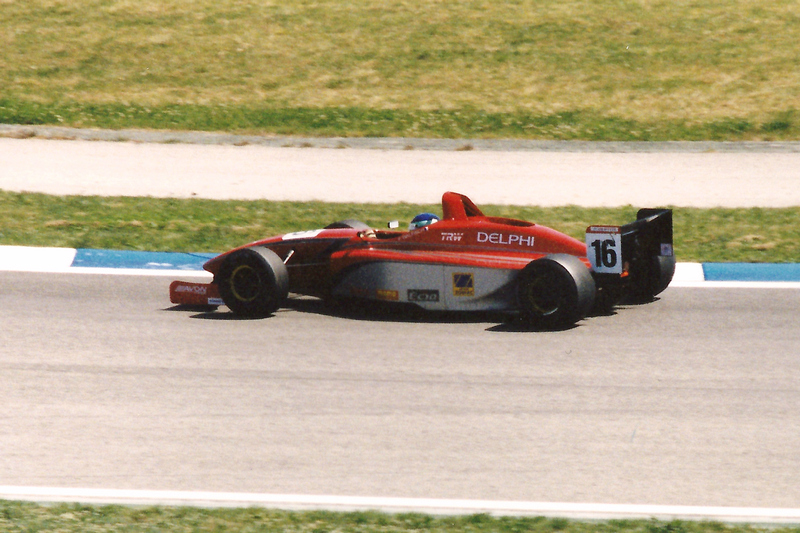
Walfisch at the Circuit de Catalunya in 1998

Fabrice Walfisch (born 9 February 1973) is a French racing driver.

== Racing record ==
=== Complete International Formula 3000 results ===
(key) (Races in bold indicate pole position; races in italics indicate fastest lap.)

| Year | Entrant | Chassis | Engine | 1 | 2 | 3 | 4 | 5 | 6 | 7 | 8 | 9 | 10 | 11 | 12 | Pos. | Pts |
|---|---|---|---|---|---|---|---|---|---|---|---|---|---|---|---|---|---|
| 1998 | Nordic Racing | Lola T96/50 | Zytek-Judd | OSC; 13 | IMO; 18 | CAT; 20 | SIL; 25† | MON; DNQ | PAU; DNQ | A1R; Ret | HOC; Ret | HUN; Ret | SPA; 22 | PER; Ret | NÜR; 8 | 30th | 0 |
| 1999 | Draco Engineering | Lola T99/50 | Zytek | IMO; 3 | MON; DNQ | CAT; 16† | MAG; Ret | SIL; 13 | A1R; Ret | HOC; Ret | **HUN**; Ret | SPA; 16 | NÜR; Ret | | | 14th | 4 |
| 2000 | Team Astromega | Lola T99/50 | Zytek | IMO; Ret | SIL; Ret | CAT; DNQ | NÜR; Ret | MON; Ret | MAG; 18 | A1R | HOC | | | | | 29th | 0 |
| 2000 | Coloni F3000 | Lola T99/50 | Zytek | | | | | | | | | HUN; 10 | SPA; DNQ | | | 29th | 0 |
