= 2018 Race of Champions =

Motor racing competition

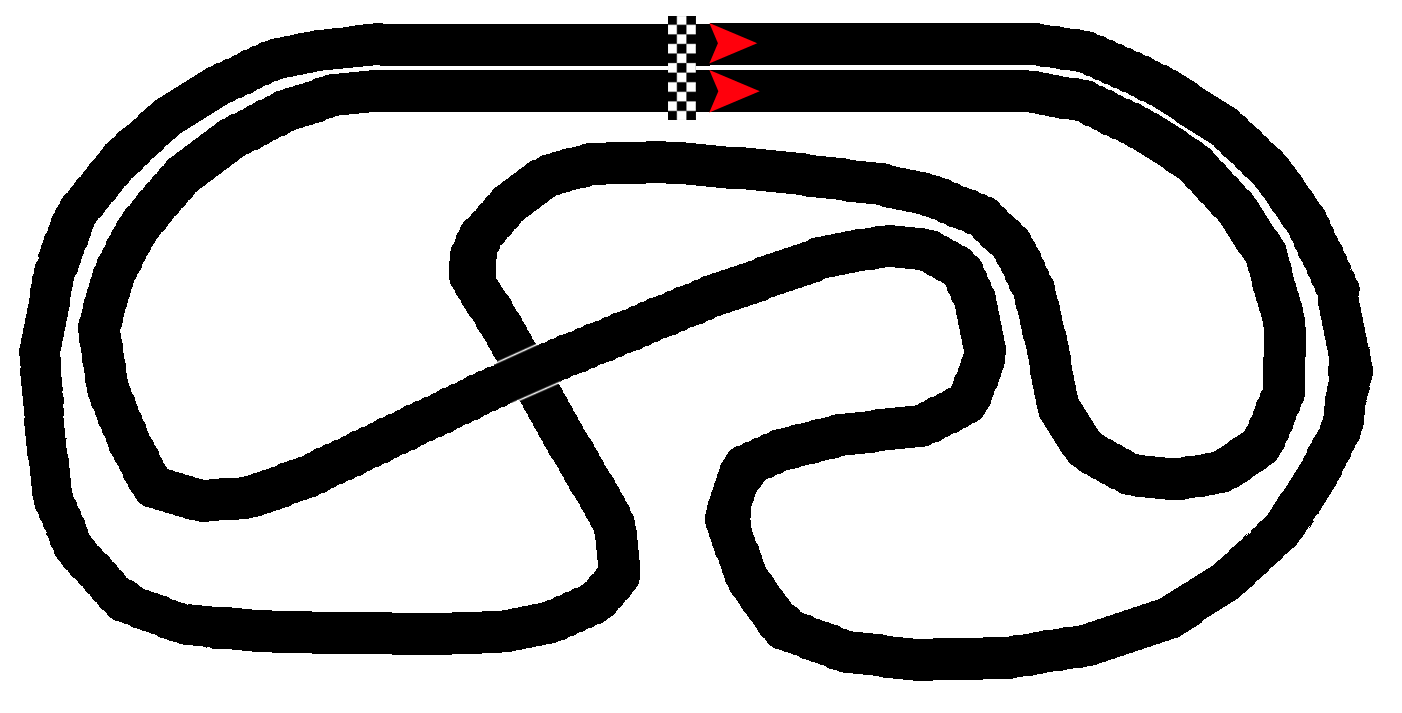
Layout of 2018 Race of Champions

The 2018 Race of Champions was the 29th running of the event, and took place on 2–3 February 2018 at King Fahd International Stadium in Riyadh, it was the first-ever international motorsport competition in Saudi Arabia.

== Participants ==
Nations' Cup team	Drivers	2017 series
Latin America	(Colombia) Juan Pablo Montoya	IndyCar Series, WeatherTech SportsCar Championship
Latin America	(Brazil) Hélio Castroneves	IndyCar Series, WeatherTech SportsCar Championship
Nordic	(Denmark) Tom Kristensen	none
Nordic	(Norway) Petter Solberg	World Rallycross Championship
Sim Racing All Star	(Netherlands) Rudy van Buren	World's Fastest Gamer
Sim Racing All Star	(Italy) Enzo Bonito	none
United Kingdom	David Coulthard	none
United Kingdom	Lando Norris	FIA F3 European Championship, FIA F2 Championship
United States	Josef Newgarden	IndyCar Series
United States	Ryan Hunter-Reay	IndyCar Series, WeatherTech SportsCar Championship
Saudi Arabia	Yazeed Al-Rajhi	World Rally Championship
Saudi Arabia	Ahmed Bin Khanen	none
Lebanon	Karl Masaad	F4 British Championship
Lebanon	Mansour Chebli	none
United Arab Emirates	Khaled Al Qubaisi	World Endurance Championship
United Arab Emirates	Khalid Al Qassimi	World Rally Championship
Germany	Timo Bernhard	World Endurance Championship
Germany	René Rast	Deutsche Tourenwagen Masters
Sweden	Johan Kristoffersson	World Rallycross Championship
Sweden	Joel Eriksson	FIA F3 European Championship
Mexico	Memo Rojas	European Le Mans Series
Mexico	Abraham Calderón	NASCAR PEAK Mexico Series

== Nations' Cup ==
=== Group stage ===
==== Group A ====
Pos.	Team	Wins	Losses	Best Time
1	Germany	5	1	0:57.6525
2	(Brazil) (Colombia) Latin America	4	2	0:57.2472
3	(United States) USA	2	4	0:58.7252
4	Mexico	1	5	0:57.7438

==== Group B ====
Pos.	Team	Wins	Losses	Best Time
1	(Denmark) (Norway) Nordic	4	2	0:57.3374
2	Sweden	4	2	0:57.5115
3	Sim Racing All Star	2	4	0:57.7382
4	United Kingdom	2	4	0:57.9191

==== Group C ====
Pos.	Team	Wins	Losses	Best Time
1	Saudi Arabia	2	2	0:59.3497
2	United Arab Emirates	2	2	1:00.6372
3	Lebanon	2	2	1:01.2552

=== Knockout stage ===
Semi-finals
Saudi Arabia	0
Germany	2
(Denmark) (Norway) Nordic	1
(Brazil) (Colombia) Latin America	2

Final
Germany	2
(Brazil) (Colombia) Latin America	1

- Source

== Race of Champions ==
=== Group stage ===
==== Group A ====
Pos.	Team	Wins	Losses	Best Time
1	(Colombia) Juan Pablo Montoya	3	0	0:58.4000
2	(United States) Ryan Hunter-Reay	2	1	0:59.4700
3	(Brazil) Hélio Castroneves	1	2	0:59.0570
4	(Mexico) Memo Rojas	0	3	1:00.7312

==== Group B ====
Pos.	Team	Wins	Losses	Best Time
1	(United Kingdom) David Coulthard	3	0	0:57.4500
2	(Denmark) Tom Kristensen	2	1	0:57.4900
3	(Netherlands) Rudy Van Buren	1	2	0:57.9430
4	(Germany) Timo Bernhard	0	3	0:58.8524

==== Group C ====
Pos.	Team	Wins	Losses	Best Time
1	(Sweden) Johan Kristoffersson	2	1	0:58.0770
2	(Sweden) Joel Eriksson	2	1	0:58.4030
3	(Germany) René Rast	2	1	0:58.3570
4	(United Kingdom) Lando Norris	0	3	0:58.9108

==== Group D ====
Pos.	Team	Wins	Losses	Best Time
1	(Norway) Petter Solberg	3	0	0:57.5330
2	(United States) Josef Newgarden	2	1	0:58.5730
3	(Saudi Arabia) Ahmed Bin Khanen	1	2	0:58.8320
4	(Saudi Arabia) Yazeed Al-Rajhi	0	3	1:01.3017

=== Knockout stage ===
Quarterfinals
(Colombia) Juan Pablo Montoya	0
(Denmark) Tom Kristensen	1
(United Kingdom) David Coulthard	1
(United States) Ryan Hunter-Reay	0
(United States) Josef Newgarden	0
(Sweden) Johan Kristoffersson	1
(Norway) Petter Solberg	1
(Sweden) Joel Eriksson	0

Semifinals
(Denmark) Tom Kristensen	0
(United Kingdom) David Coulthard	1
(Sweden) Johan Kristoffersson	0
(Norway) Petter Solberg	1

Final
(United Kingdom) David Coulthard	2
(Norway) Petter Solberg	0
