= Team Rosberg =

Racing team

(Germany) (Finland) Team Rosberg Rosberg X Racing
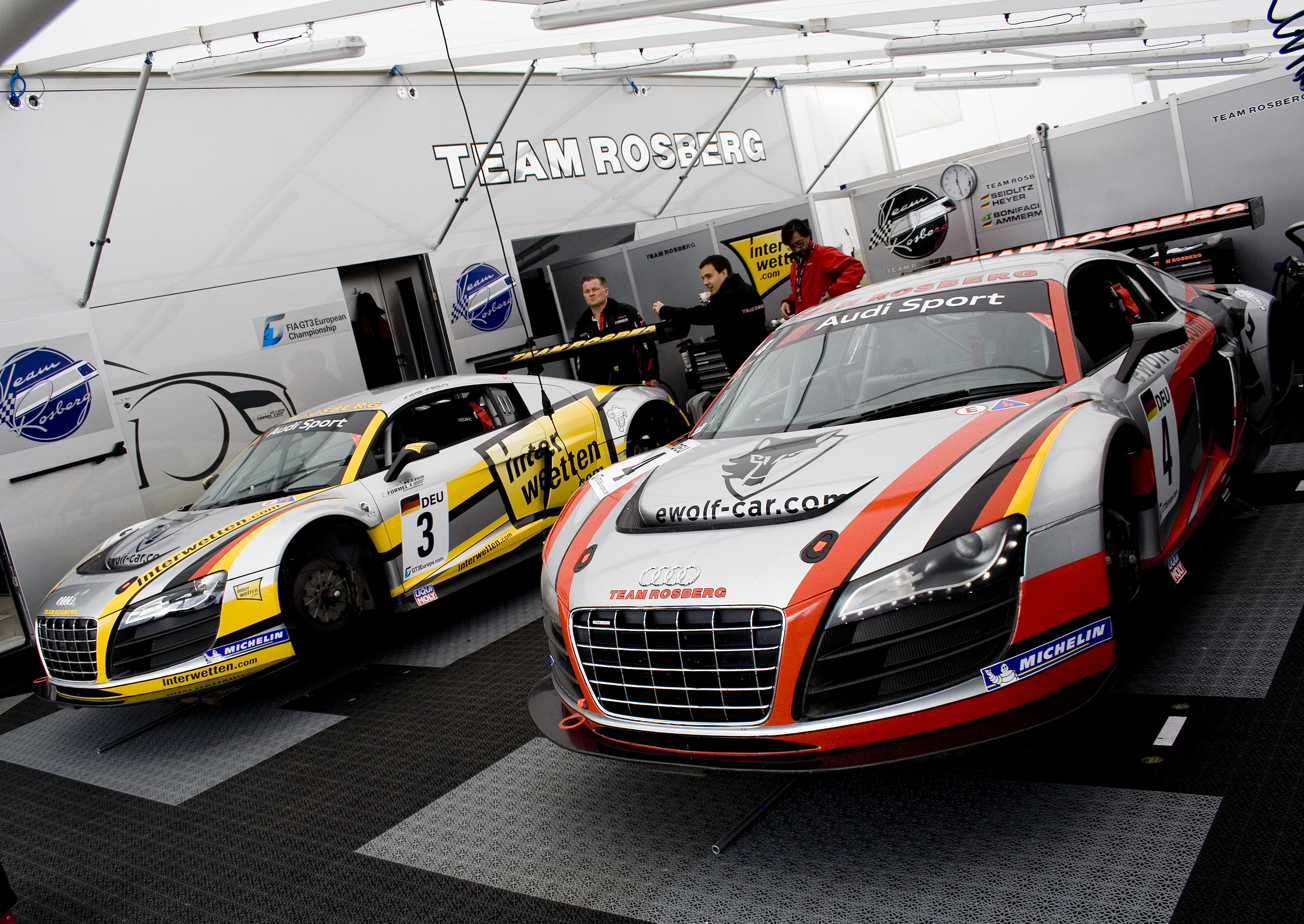
- Founded: 1994
- Team principal(s): (Finland) Keke Rosberg (Germany) Arno Zensen (Germany) Nico Rosberg
- Former series: DTM; Super Tourenwagen Cup; F3 Euroseries; German Formula 3 A1 Grand Prix; Formula BMW ADAC; FIA GT3 European Championship; ADAC GT Masters
- Teams' Championships: 2002 German F3; 2017 DTM
- Drivers' Championships: 2002 German F3 (Gary Paffett); 2002 Formula BMW ADAC (Nico Rosberg); 2017, 2019, 2020 DTM (René Rast)

Team Rosberg GmbH is a motor racing organisation that competes in single-seater and touring car disciplines in Europe. It was founded in 1994 by former Formula One world champion Keke Rosberg, of Finland. It is headquartered at Neustadt an der Weinstraße in Germany, and competes under a German racing licence.

== Touring cars (1995–present) ==
After his retirement from Formula One in 1986, Keke Rosberg stayed involved in racing, competing with Peugeot's World Sports Car Championship operation in the early 1990s. He entered Germany's top-level touring car championship – the DTM – in 1992, driving first for Mercedes-AMG, and then for Opel Team Joest.

=== The DTM and ITC ===
It was in 1994 that he decided to begin the transition into team ownership, and the newly formed Team Rosberg became part of Opel's DTM program in 1995. In this first year, Keke Rosberg continued driving alongside reigning champion Klaus Ludwig in a pair of Calibra V6 coupes. The Calibra was not as competitive as the Mercedes C-Klasse; Ludwig achieved Opel's only race win of the season on his way to 3rd in the drivers' championship, and Team Rosberg was ranked in 6th place in the teams' standings.

In 1996, Rosberg retired from driving to concentrate on team management. As the DTM evolved into the short-lived International Touring car Championship, Ludwig moved to another Opel squad Zakspeed. JJ Lehto, managed by Rosberg at the time joined the team along with Hans-Joachim Stuck. Stuck won in Helsinki and finished in 6th place in the standings. Lehto achieved several podiums but failed to win a race.

=== Super Touring ===
After the collapse of the ITC, Team Rosberg transferred to the Super Tourenwagen Cup, Germany's Supertouring series. Rosberg managed Nissan's factory program in 1997 and 1998, with a pair of Nissan Primeras for Roland Asch and Sascha Maassen. Asch was the highest ranked Nissan driver, finishing eighth in the 1997 championship. 1998 was no different; Asch again finished eighth overall, and Maassen's replacement, Michael Krumm, finished ninth.

When Nissan's factory participation in the STC came to an end, Rosberg took a sabbatical from touring cars in 1999 and became involved in formula racing for the first time.

=== The reborn DTM ===
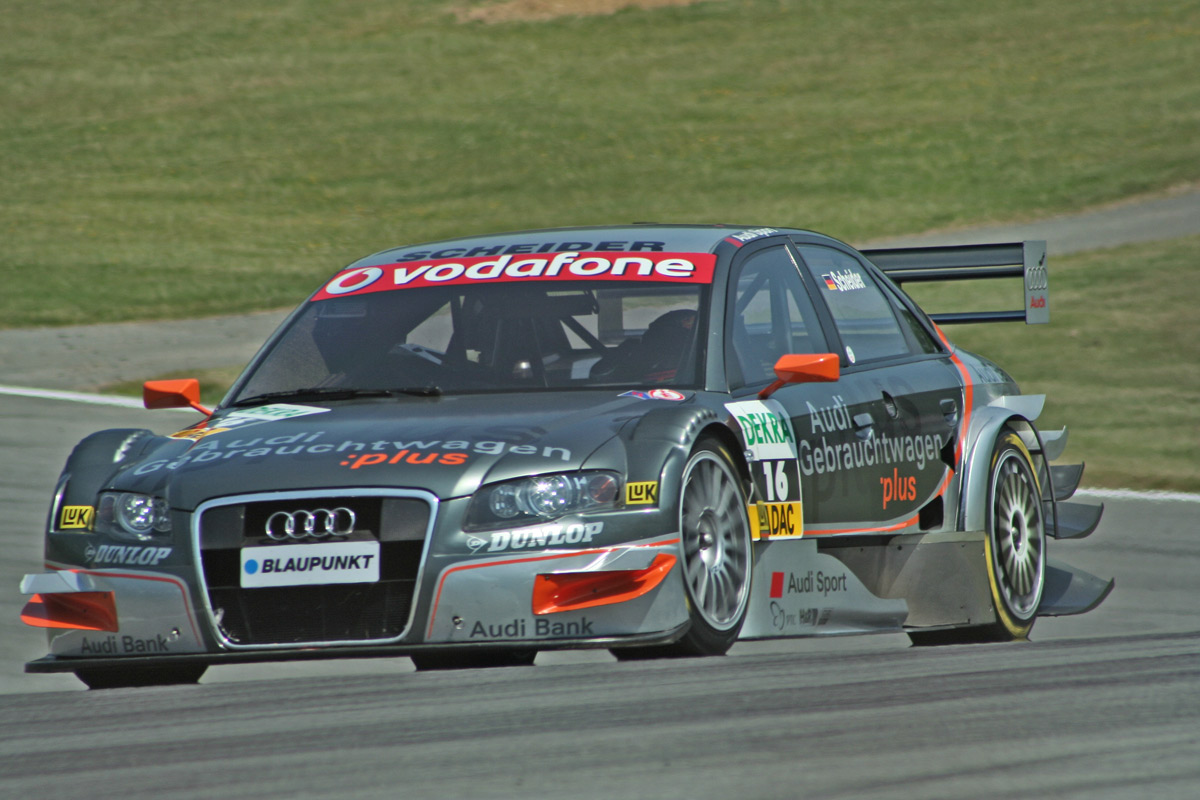
A Team Rosberg-run Audi A4 being driven by Timo Scheider during the 2006 DTM season.

Team Rosberg promptly took the opportunity to participate in the DTM again when it was recreated at the turn of the millennium. While it might have been expected to renew its association with Opel, it instead partnered with Mercedes-AMG. It was one of four teams running CLK DTMs, with Darren Turner and Pedro Lamy on driving duty. It was a respectable season, in which Rosberg was classified 7th in the teams' standings, while Lamy and Turner were classified 13th and 14th overall.

In 2001, with only the factory AMG team running 2001-spec CLKs, good results were harder to find. The lack of success prompted Lamy to leave to team, with David Saelens taking his place. Turner was the highest placed of the three drivers, in 15th position overall, and Rosberg was left in 8th place in the teams' standings.

The next two years saw a continuation of Rosberg's position as a Mercedes team running year-old cars, with two cars for Stefan Mücke and Christijan Albers in 2002, and two cars for Mücke (later replaced by Patrick Huisman) and Gary Paffett in 2003. Albers and Paffett both graduated to the factory AMG line-up in 2003 and 2004 respectively, and Paffett became the DTM champion in 2005.

When the relationship between Rosberg and Mercedes ended after the 2004 season, it spent 2005 away from touring cars, while considering alternative programs. One such option, which did not come to fruition, was the possibility of running the Prodrive-built Aston Martin DBR9 GT1 car in the FIA GT Championship.

The hiatus was ended with the opportunity to return to the DTM, not as a Mercedes customer, but as an Audi customer in 2006. Rosberg ran a brace of 2005-spec A4 saloons for Frank Stippler and Timo Scheider, which resulted in 4th position in the teams' standings and 10th in the drivers' championship for Scheider.

In 2007, Team Rosberg ran Mike Rockenfeller and Lucas Luhr to 12th and 17th in the Drivers' Championship. Luhr's lack of results (he scored only one point) resulted in him returning to the American Le Mans Series, where he was considerably more successful, becoming 2008 LMP1 champion with the Audi R10.

Team Rosberg has continued to race Audi cars in DTM, with 2019 as its most successful recent season. René Rast won 7 races throughout the nine race weekends, Jamie Green won 1 race, helping the team to first in that year's championship.

== Formula racing (1999–2005) ==
When Team Rosberg left the Super Tourenwagen Cup, it made the jump to formula racing. In 1999, it began a dual program at national level in Germany, with entry into Formula Three and the first iteration of Formula BMW. In the German F3 Championship, it ran future DTM and prototype driver Pierre Kaffer to 8th place in the standings, while its three-car Formula BMW line-up resulted in 2nd and 3rd in the championship for Giorgio Mecataff and Hannu Wiinikainen.

During its touring car return in 2000, Rosberg maintained its presence in formula racing. Hannu Wiinikainen graduated to the two-car F3 team, and the FBMW team was expanded to four cars. It again took the runner-up position in the drivers' championship, this time with Kimmo Liimatainen. It also ran future Formula One driver Christian Klien. Klien led the FBMW line-up in 2001, and finished 3rd in the championship.

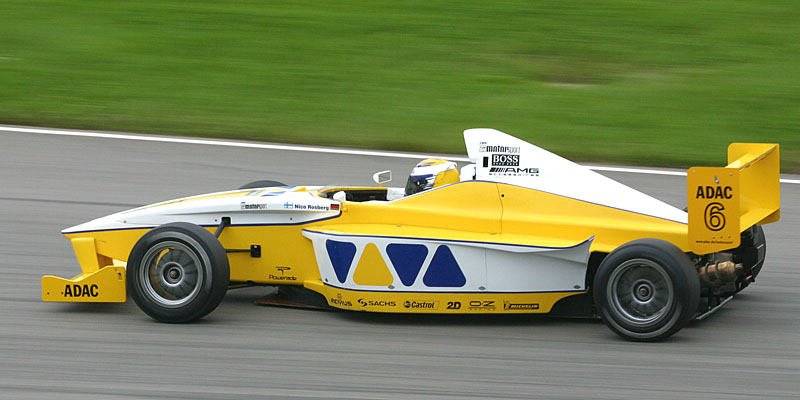
Nico Rosberg, 2002 FBMW ADAC champion

That year also saw the debut in the German F3 Championship of future DTM champion Gary Paffett. He stayed with Rosberg in 2002 and won the drivers' championship. Rosberg also secured the teams' title in what became its most successful season. In Formula BMW ADAC, Nico Rosberg won the championship in his rookie season, driving for his father's team under the banner of VIVA Racing. When Rosberg's Formula 3 team moved to the new Euroseries in its inaugural year, Nico graduated with it, and stayed for two years before moving on to GP2 in 2005.

Team Rosberg took on Austria's A1 Grand Prix franchise in 2005, but Austria ended its involvement after one season, due to a lack of results. Rosberg's entry finished 19th in the standings. At the same time, Rosberg ended its participation in Formula BMW ADAC and the F3 Euroseries at the end of 2005, concentrating instead on its DTM association with Audi.

== Results ==
Deutsche Tourenwagen Meisterschaft and International Touring car Championship results
| Year | Series | Car | Drivers | Wins | Poles | Fast laps | Points | D.C. | T.C. |
|---|---|---|---|---|---|---|---|---|---|
| 1995 | DTM | Opel Calibra V6 | (Germany) Klaus Ludwig | 2 | 0 | | 80 | 3rd | 4th |
| 1995 | DTM | Opel Calibra V6 | (Finland) Keke Rosberg | 0 | 0 | | 17 | 18th | 4th |
| 1995 | ITC | Opel Calibra V6 | (Germany) Klaus Ludwig | 0 | 0 | | 21 | 14th | 8th |
| 1995 | ITC | Opel Calibra V6 | (Finland) Keke Rosberg | 0 | 0 | | 3 | 20th | 8th |
| 1996 | ITC | Opel Calibra V6 | (Finland) Jyrki Järvilehto | 0 | 0 | | 148 | 5th | 4th |
| 1996 | ITC | Opel Calibra V6 | (Germany) Hans-Joachim Stuck | 2 | 1 | | 112 | 9th | 4th |

Deutsche Tourenwagen Masters results
| Year | Car | Drivers | Wins | Poles | Fast laps | Points | D.C. | T.C. |
|---|---|---|---|---|---|---|---|---|
| 2000 | AMG-Mercedes CLK-DTM | (Portugal) Pedro Lamy | 0 | 0 | 0 | 39 | 13th | 6th |
| 2000 | AMG-Mercedes CLK-DTM | (United Kingdom) Darren Turner | 0 | 0 | 0 | 19 | 14th | 6th |
| 2001 | AMG-Mercedes CLK-DTM | (Portugal) Pedro Lamy | 0 | 0 | 0 | 12 | 16th | 8th |
| 2001 | AMG-Mercedes CLK-DTM | (United Kingdom) Darren Turner | 0 | 0 | 0 | 15 | 15th | 8th |
| 2002 | AMG-Mercedes CLK-DTM | (Netherlands) Christijan Albers | 0 | 0 | 0 | 5 | 12th | 6th |
| 2002 | AMG-Mercedes CLK-DTM | (Germany) Stefan Mücke | 0 | 0 | 0 | 0 | NC | 6th |
| 2003 | AMG-Mercedes CLK-DTM | (United Kingdom) Gary Paffett | 0 | 0 | 0 | 4 | 11th | 5th |
| 2003 | AMG-Mercedes CLK-DTM | (Germany) Stefan Mücke | 0 | 0 | 0 | 0 | NC | 5th |
| 2003 | AMG-Mercedes CLK-DTM | (Netherlands) Patrick Huisman | 0 | 0 | 0 | 0 | NC | 5th |
| 2004 | AMG-Mercedes CLK-DTM | (Czech Republic) Jarek Janis | 0 | 0 | 0 | 0 | NC | NC |
| 2004 | AMG-Mercedes CLK-DTM | (Germany) Bernd Mayländer | 0 | 0 | 0 | 0 | NC | NC |
| 2006 | Audi A4 DTM 2005 | (Germany) Timo Scheider | 0 | 0 | 0 | 12 | 10th | 4th |
| 2006 | Audi A4 DTM 2005 | (Germany) Frank Stippler | 0 | 0 | 0 | 3 | 14th | 4th |
| 2007 | Audi A4 DTM 2005 | (Germany) Mike Rockenfeller | 0 | 0 | 0 | 11 | 12th | 6th |
| 2007 | Audi A4 DTM 2005 | (Germany) Lucas Luhr | 0 | 0 | 0 | 1 | 17th | 6th |
| 2008 | Audi A4 DTM 2007 | (Germany) Mike Rockenfeller | 0 | 0 | 0 | 6 | 11th | 7th |
| 2008 | Audi A4 DTM 2007 | (Germany) Markus Winkelhock | 0 | 0 | 0 | 6 | 12th | 7th |
| 2009 | Audi A4 DTM 2008 | (Germany) Mike Rockenfeller | 0 | 0 | 0 | 4 | 14th | 7th |
| 2009 | Audi A4 DTM 2008 | (Germany) Markus Winkelhock | 0 | 0 | 0 | 11 | 10th | 7th |
| 2010 | Audi A4 DTM 2008 | (Germany) Markus Winkelhock | 0 | 0 | 0 | 7 | 12th | 8th |
| 2010 | Audi A4 DTM 2008 | (United Kingdom) Katherine Legge | 0 | 0 | 0 | 0 | NC | 8th |
| 2011 | Audi A4 DTM 2008 | (Portugal) Filipe Albuquerque | 0 | 0 | 0 | 9 | 12th | 6th |
| 2011 | Audi A4 DTM 2008 | (Italy) Edoardo Mortara | 1 | 0 | 0 | 21 | 9th | 6th |
| 2012 | Audi A5 DTM | (Italy) Edoardo Mortara | 2 | 1 | 0 | 82 | 5th | 4th |
| 2012 | Audi A5 DTM | (Portugal) Filipe Albuquerque | 0 | 0 | 0 | 26 | 11th | 4th |
| 2013 | Audi RS5 DTM | (Italy) Edoardo Mortara | 0 | 0 | 0 | 3 | 21st | 11th |
| 2013 | Audi RS5 DTM | (Portugal) Filipe Albuquerque | 0 | 0 | 0 | 16 | 18th | 11th |
| 2014 | Audi RS5 DTM | (United Kingdom) Jamie Green | 0 | 0 | 0 | 43 | 10th | 7th |
| 2014 | Audi RS5 DTM | (Switzerland) Nico Müller | 0 | 0 | 1 | 10 | 19th | 7th |
| 2015 | Audi RS5 DTM | (Switzerland) Nico Müller | 0 | 0 | 0 | 26 | 21st | 5th |
| 2015 | Audi RS5 DTM | (United Kingdom) Jamie Green | 4 | 2 | 3 | 150 | 2nd | 5th |
| 2016 | Audi RS5 DTM | (France) Adrien Tambay | 0 | 0 | 0 | 40 | 18th | 4th |
| 2016 | Audi RS5 DTM | (United Kingdom) Jamie Green | 1 | 2 | 3 | 145 | 3rd | 4th |
| 2016 | Audi RS5 DTM | (Germany) René Rast | 0 | 0 | 0 | 8 | 23rd | 4th |
| 2017 | Audi RS5 DTM | (Germany) René Rast | 2 | 3 | 4 | 179 | 1st | style="background:#FFFFBF;"| 1st |
| 2017 | Audi RS5 DTM | (United Kingdom) Jamie Green | 3 | 2 | 5 | 173 | 3rd | style="background:#FFFFBF;"| 1st |
| 2018 | Audi RS5 DTM | (Germany) René Rast | 7 | 2 | 1 | 251 | 2nd | style="background:#FFDF9F;"| 3rd |
| 2018 | Audi RS5 DTM | (United Kingdom) Jamie Green | 0 | 0 | 1 | 27 | 18th | style="background:#FFDF9F;"| 3rd |
| 2019 | Audi RS5 Turbo DTM 2019 | (Brazil) Pietro Fittipaldi | 0 | 0 | 2 | 22 | 15th | style="background:#FFFFBF;"| 1st |
| 2019 | Audi RS5 Turbo DTM 2019 | (Germany) René Rast | 7 | 8 | 2 | 322 | 1st | style="background:#FFFFBF;"| 1st |
| 2019 | Audi RS5 Turbo DTM 2019 | (United Kingdom) Jamie Green | 1 | 2 | 0 | 115 | 8th | style="background:#FFFFBF;"| 1st |
| 2020 | Audi RS5 Turbo DTM 2020 | (Germany) René Rast | 7 | 7 | 7 | 353 | 1st | style="background:#DFDFDF;"| 2nd |
| 2020 | Audi RS5 Turbo DTM 2020 | (United Kingdom) Jamie Green | 0 | 0 | 1 | 98 | 8th | style="background:#DFDFDF;"| 2nd |
| 2021 | Audi R8 LMS GT3 Evo | (Switzerland) Nico Müller | 0 | 0 | 2 | 56 | 10th | 8th |
| 2021 | Audi R8 LMS GT3 Evo | (United States) Dev Gore | 0 | 0 | 0 | 0 | 22nd | 8th |
| 2021 | Audi R8 LMS GT3 Evo | (Germany) Christopher Haase | 0 | 0 | 0 | 1 | 21st | 8th |
| 2022 | Audi R8 LMS GT3 Evo II | (United States) Dev Gore | 0 | 0 | 0 | 30 | 17th | 5th |
| 2022 | Audi R8 LMS GT3 Evo II | (Switzerland) Nico Müller | 1 | 1 | 0 | 105 | 7th | 5th |

A1 Grand Prix results
| Year | Car | Team | Wins | Poles | Fast laps | Points | T.C. |
|---|---|---|---|---|---|---|---|
| 2005-06 | Lola-Zytek | A1 Team Austria | 0 | 0 | 0 | 14 | 19th |

Formula Three Euroseries results
| Year | Car | Drivers | Wins | Poles | Fast laps | Points | D.C. | T.C. |
|---|---|---|---|---|---|---|---|---|
| 2003 | Dallara F303-Spiess Opel | (Finland) Nico Rosberg | 1 | 1 | 2 | 45 | 8th | 6th |
| 2003 | Dallara F303-Spiess Opel | (Austria) Andreas Zuber | 0 | 0 | 0 | 2 | 24th | 6th |
| 2004 | Dallara F303-Spiess Opel | (Finland) Nico Rosberg | 3 | 2 | 2 | 70 | 4th | 6th |
| 2004 | Dallara F303-Spiess Opel | (Austria) Andreas Zuber | 0 | 0 | 0 | 0 | NC | 6th |
| 2005 | Dallara F303-Spiess Opel | (Netherlands) Giedo van der Garde | 0 | 1 | 1 | 34 | 9th | 7th |
| 2005 | Dallara F303-Spiess Opel | (Japan) Kohei Hirate | 0 | 0 | 0 | 18 | 12th | 7th |

Formula Three Special races results
| Year | Car | Race | Driver | Pole | Fast lap | Pos. |
|---|---|---|---|---|---|---|
| 2003 | Dallara F303-Spiess Opel | Masters of Formula 3 | (Austria) Andreas Zuber | no | no | 26th |
| 2004 | Dallara F303-Spiess Opel | Masters of Formula 3 | (Finland) Nico Rosberg | no | no | 6th |
| 2004 | Dallara F303-Spiess Opel | Masters of Formula 3 | (Austria) Andreas Zuber | no | no | 25th |
| 2004 | Dallara F303-Spiess Opel | F3 Macau Grand Prix | (Finland) Nico Rosberg | | | NC |
| 2004 | Dallara F303-Spiess Opel | Bahrain F3 Superprix | (Finland) Nico Rosberg | | | 2nd |
| 2005 | Dallara F303-Spiess Opel | Masters of Formula 3 | (Japan) Kohei Hirate | no | no | 5th |
| 2005 | Dallara F303-Spiess Opel | Masters of Formula 3 | (Netherlands) Giedo van der Garde | no | no | 6th |
| 2005 | Dallara F303-Spiess Opel | F3 Macau Grand Prix | (Japan) Kohei Hirate | | | NC |

German Formula Three Championship results
| Year | Car | Drivers | Wins | Poles | Fast laps | Points | D.C. | T.C. |
|---|---|---|---|---|---|---|---|---|
| 1999 | Dallara F399-Sodemo Renault | (Germany) Pierre Kaffer | 0 | 2 | 1 | 71.5 | 8th | 7th |
| 1999 | Dallara F399-Sodemo Renault | (Finland) Kari Mäenpää | 0 | 0 | 0 | 2 | 21st | 7th |
| 1999 | Dallara F399-Sodemo Renault | (Netherlands) Wouter van Eeuwijk | 0 | 0 | 0 | 0 | NC | 7th |
| 2000 | Dallara F399-Sodemo Renault | (Finland) Kari Mäenpää | 0 | 0 | 0 | 15 | 21st | 15th |
| 2000 | Dallara F399-Sodemo Renault | (Finland) Hannu Viinikainen | 0 | 0 | 0 | 1 | 28th | 15th |
| 2001 | Dallara F301-Sodemo Renault | (United Kingdom) Gary Paffett | 1 | 1 | 2 | 123 | 6th | 6th |
| 2001 | Dallara F301-Sodemo Renault | (France) Laurent Delahaye | 0 | 0 | 0 | 4 | 26th | 6th |
| 2002 | Dallara F302-Spiess Opel | (United Kingdom) Gary Paffett | 7 | 6 | 6 | 83 | 1st | style="background:#FFFFBF;"| 1st |
| 2002 | Dallara F302-Spiess Opel | (Finland) Kimmo Liimatainen | 1 | 1 | 0 | 22 | 10th | style="background:#FFFFBF;"| 1st |

- D.C. = Drivers' Championship position, T.C. = Teams' Championship position.

== Timeline ==
| | 1990s | | | | | 2000s | | | | | | | | | | 2010s |
| | 95 | 96 | 97 | 98 | 99 | 00 | 01 | 02 | 03 | 04 | 05 | 06 | 07 | 08 | 09 | 10 | 11 | 12 | 13 | 14 | 15 | 16 |
| Sports car | DTM | | STW | | | DTM |
| Sports car | | | | | | | | | | | | | | | ADAC GT Masters |
| Sports car | | | | | | | | | | | | | | | FIA GT3 |
| Formulas | | | | | German F3 | | | | F3 Euro Series |
| Formulas | | | | | Formula BMW ADAC |
| Formulas | | | | | | | | | | | A1 GP |
