= René Rast =

German racing driver

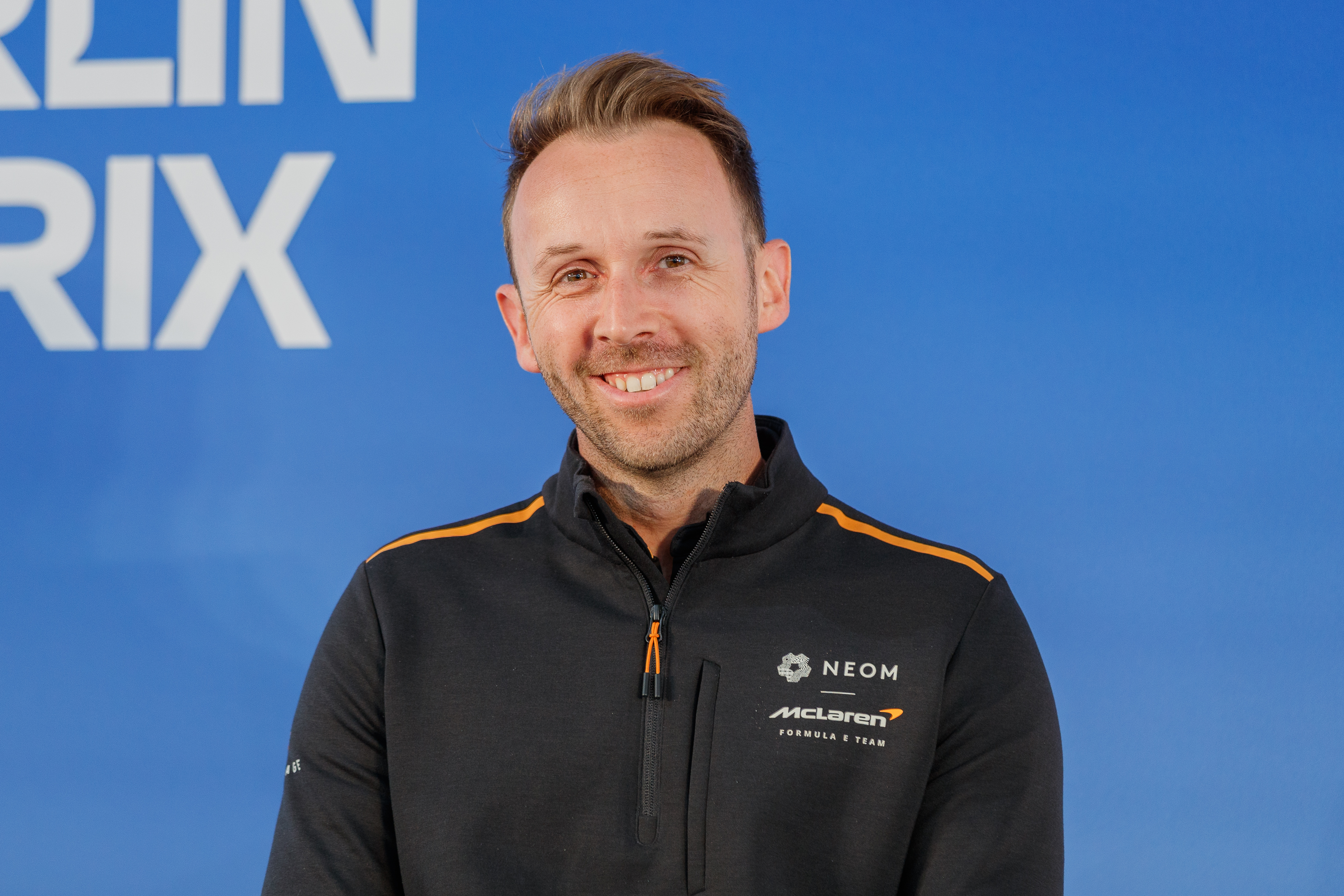
- Rast at the 2023 Berlin ePrix
- Nationality: (Germany) German
- Born: 26 October 1986 (age 40) Minden, West Germany

DTM career
- Debut season: 2016
- Current team: Schubert Motorsport
- Categorisation: FIA Gold (until 2013); FIA Platinum (2014–)
- Car number: 33
- Former teams: Phoenix Racing, Team Rosberg, Team Abt
- Starts: 138
- Championships: 3 (2017, 2019, 2020)
- Wins: 31
- Podiums: 59
- Poles: 27
- Fastest laps: 18

24 Hours of Le Mans career
- Years: 2014–2016
- Teams: Sébastien Loeb Racing; Audi Sport Team Joest; G-Drive Racing
- Best finish: 6th (2016)
- Class wins: 0

Formula E career
- Debut season: 2016–17
- Car number: 58
- Former teams: Team Aguri, Audi Sport ABT Schaeffler, McLaren
- Starts: 38
- Championships: 0
- Wins: 0
- Podiums: 3
- Poles: 0
- Fastest laps: 3
- Best finish: 13th in 2020–21
- Finished last season: 13th (78 pts)

René Rast (German pronunciation: [ʁəˈneː ˈʁast]; born 26 October 1986) is a German professional racing driver.

A sports car racing specialist, Rast won the Porsche Supercup three years in a row (2010–2012) before forging a career with Audi. He won the 24 Hours of Spa in 2012 and 2014, the Nürburgring 24 Hours in 2014 and the ADAC GT Masters in 2014. Rast later competed for Audi in LMP1, DTM and Formula E. He was DTM champion in 2017, 2019 and 2020. Rast was a confirmed driver for Audi's LMDh project at the time of its cancellation.

Rast joined BMW for LMDh and DTM in 2023, and made a one-year return to Formula E with McLaren. Rast retired from DTM in 2025 with 31 victories, the third most in the series' history behind Bernd Schneider (43) and Klaus Ludwig (37). Rast was part of BMW's first overall WEC victory at Spa in 2026.

== Career ==
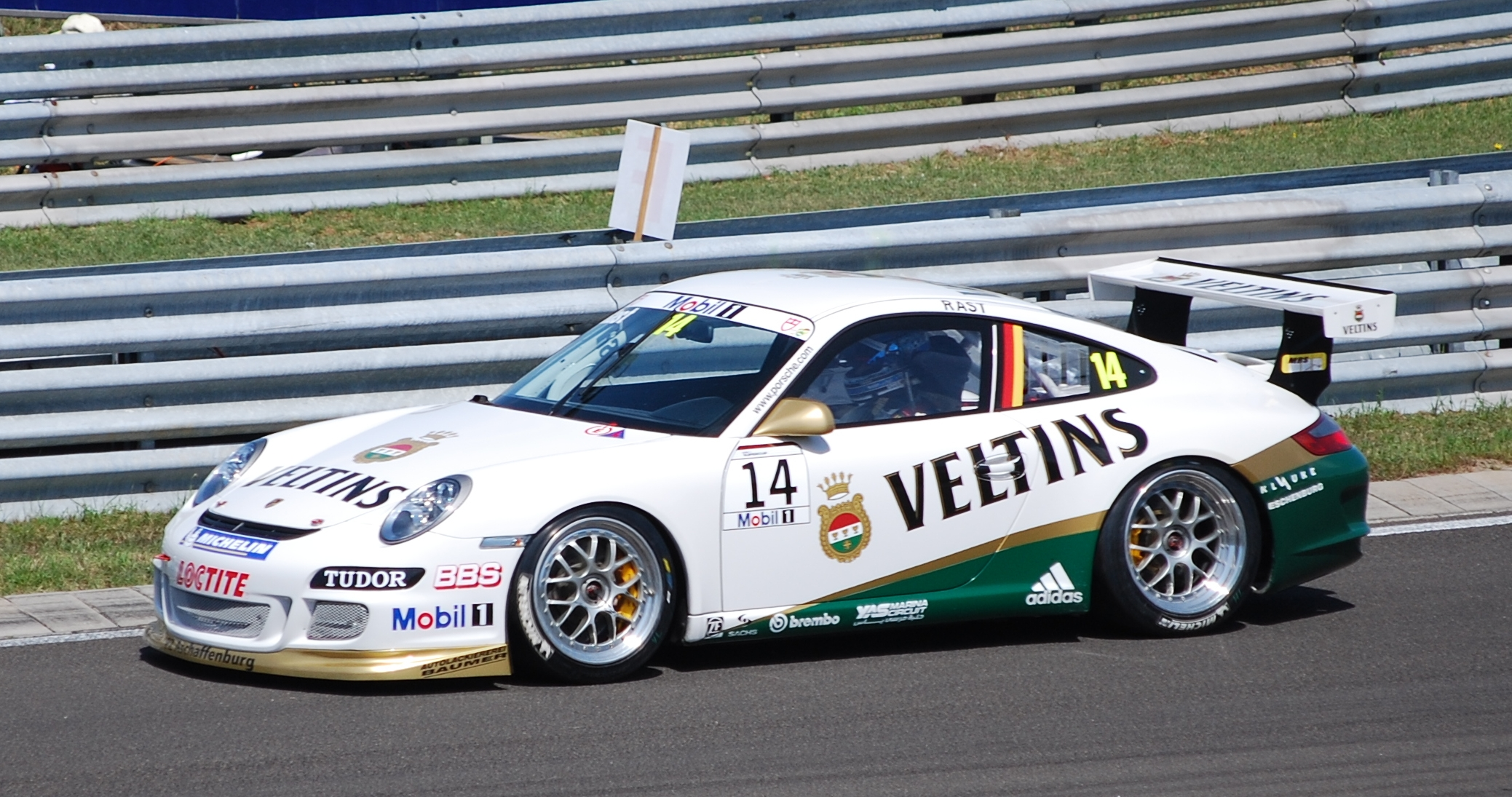
Rast driving for Veltins MRS Racing in the 2009 Porsche Supercup at the Hungaroring.

After competing in karting and Formula BMW, Rast won the 2005 ADAC Volkswagen Polo Cup and was runner-up at the 2006 Seat León Supercopa Germany.

In 2007, Rast switched to sports car racing, where he won Porsche Carrera Cup Germany in 2008 and 2012, and Porsche Supercup and claimed three championships from 2010 to 2012. Rast also competed at the ADAC GT Masters from 2010 to 2014, winning the title in his last year.

Rast ran the 2011 12 Hours of Sebring with a Paul Miller Racing Porsche 911 GT3 RSR. Rast won the 2012 24 Hours of Daytona GT class, driving a Magnus Racing Porsche 911 GT3 Cup with co-drivers Andy Lally, Richard Lietz and team owner John Potter.

Rast won the 2012 and 2014 24 Hours of Spa with a factory-supported Audi R8 LMS with teams Phoenix and WRT respectively.

In the 2013 FIA GT Series, Rast claimed a win and five podiums with an WRT Audi R8. In the 2014 Blancpain Sprint Series, he claimed a win and three podiums. In 2016, he got three podiums.

Rast debuted at the 2014 24 Hours of Le Mans with a Sébastien Loeb Racing Oreca-Nissan, finishing fourth in the LMP2 class. In 2015, he competed at two rounds of the FIA World Endurance Championship with a factory Audi R18 e-tron quattro, finishing fourth overall at the 6 Hours of Spa and seventh at the 24 Hours of Le Mans. In 2016, he raced full-time for G-Drive with an Oreca-Nissan LMP2, claiming a win at Bahrain and a second place at the 24 Hours of Le Mans and two third-place finishes at Silverstone and Austin.

Rast competed in two rounds of the 2016 Deutsche Tourenwagen Masters with an Audi RS5, finishing sixth at Hockenheim II race 1.

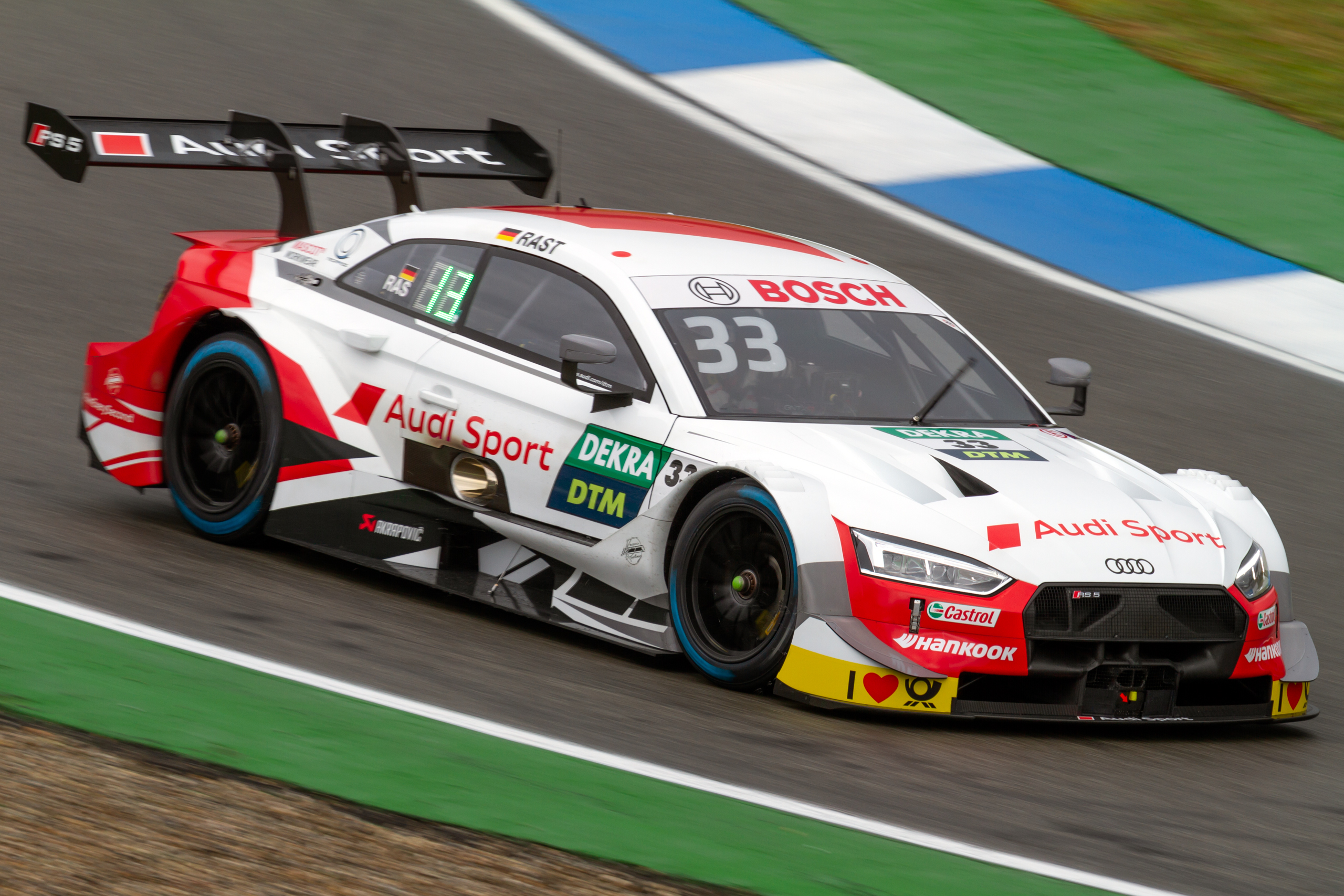
Rast won his second DTM title in 2019.

Rast won the 2017 DTM title in his first full year driving an Audi RS5 for Team Rosberg. After taking a record-breaking six consecutive race victories the following year, he missed out on a repeat title by only four points. Rast won the 2019 DTM Championship and scored his third series title the following season.

=== Formula E ===
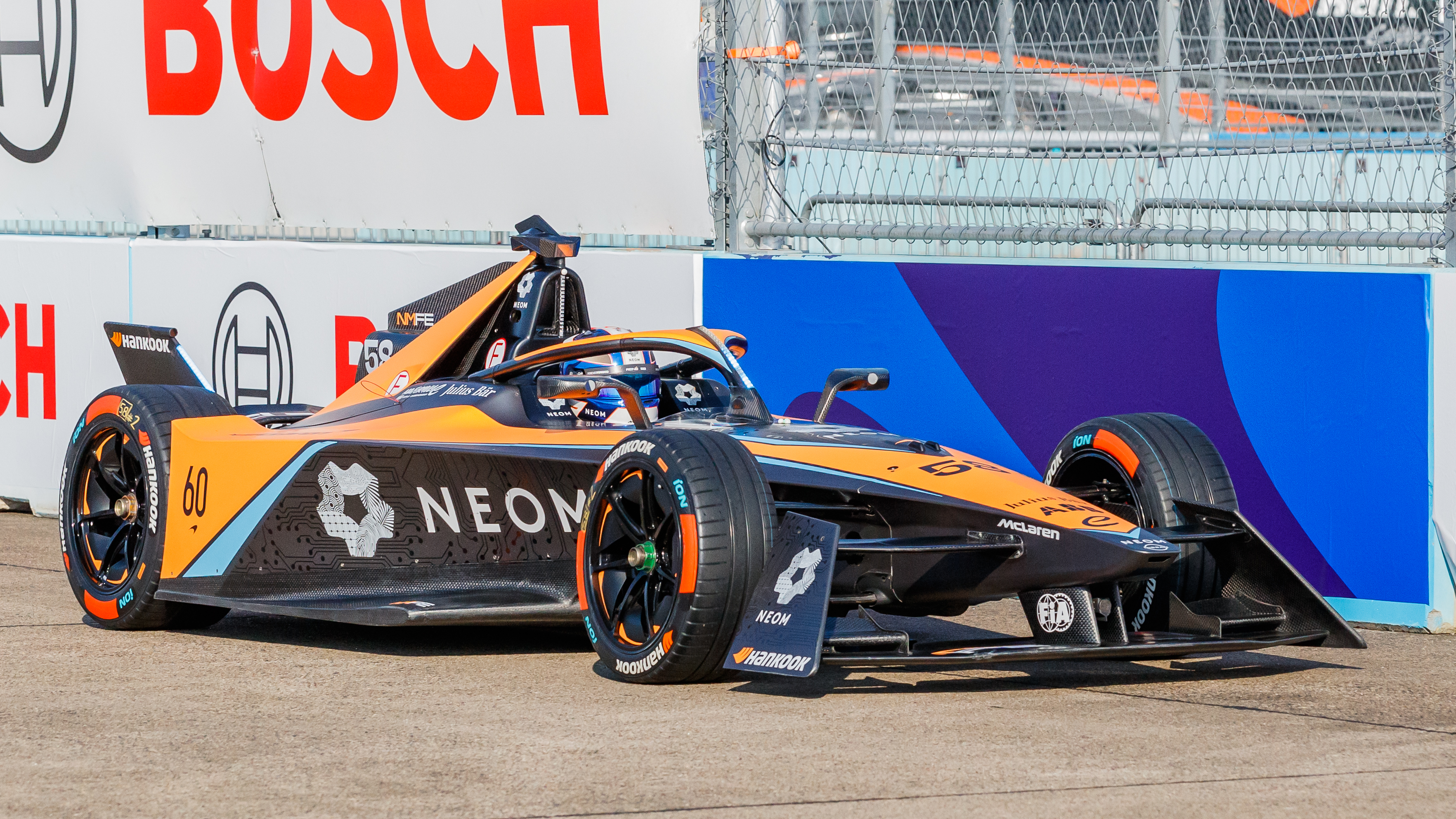
Rast with NEOM McLaren during the 2023 Berlin ePrix

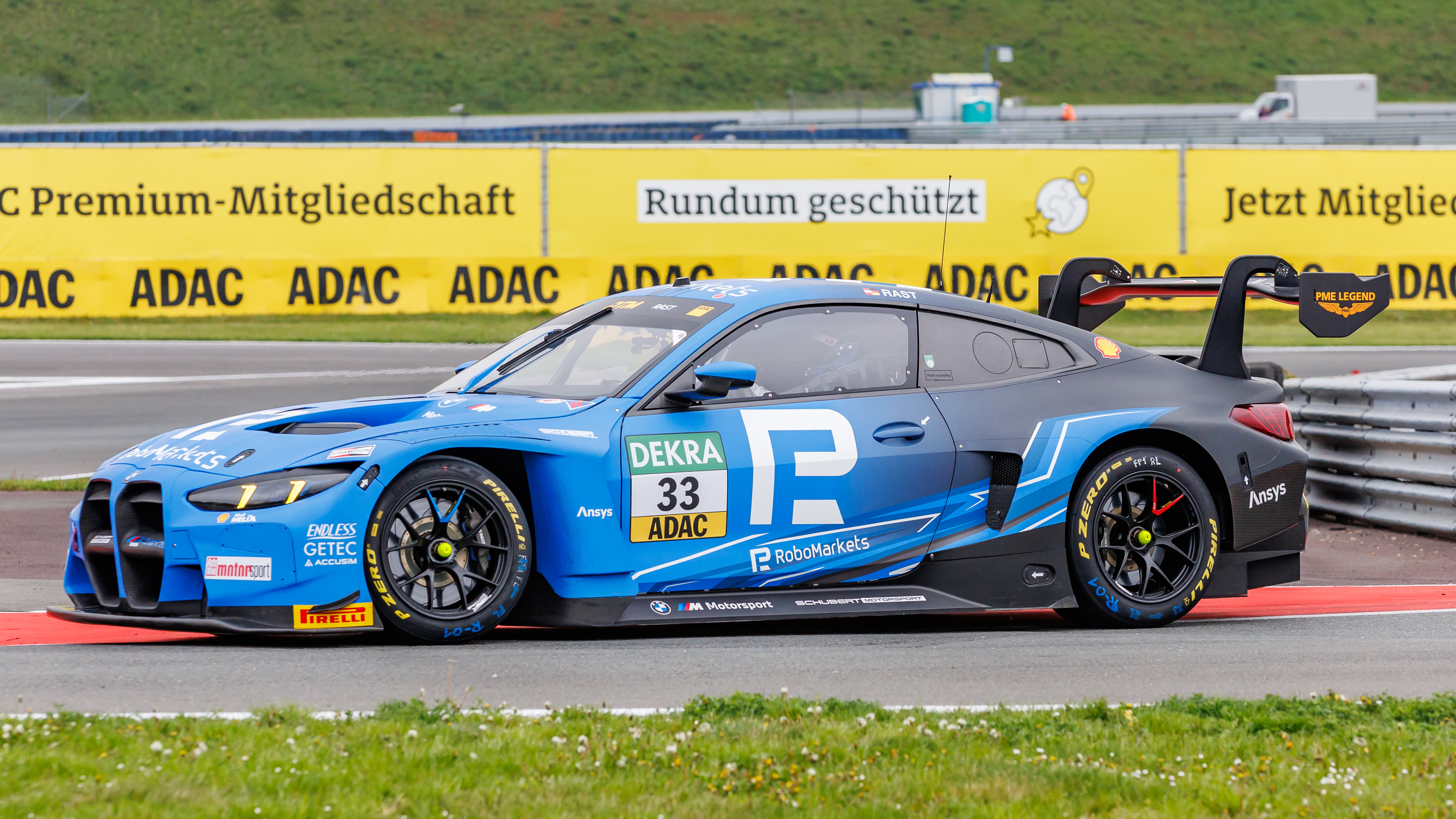
Rast at Motorsport Arena Oschersleben in 2025

Rast debuted in Formula E at the 2016 Berlin ePrix replacing António Félix da Costa (who had a DTM commitment) at Team Aguri.

Rast returned to Formula E for the final six races of the 2019-20 season in Berlin, replacing the sacked Daniel Abt at Audi Sport ABT Schaeffler. He managed to score a podium finish in the fifth race where he crossed the line in third place. Rast drove for Audi as a permanent driver for the 2020-21 Formula E Championship, partnering Lucas di Grassi.

Rast did not compete in the 2021–22 Formula E World Championship.

Rast made his return to the series in the 2022–23 season driving for the McLaren Formula E Team. He scored one podium throughout the season, and ended 13th in the standings. Rast announced his departure from McLaren following the season.

== Racing record ==
=== Career summary ===
Season	Series	Team	Races	Wins	Poles	F/Laps	Podiums	Points	Position
2003	Formula BMW ADAC	KUG/Dewalt Racing	20	0	0	0	0	14	18th
2004	Formula BMW ADAC	KUG/Dewalt Racing	2	0	0	0	0	1	22nd
2004	Formula BMW ADAC	Team Lauderbach Motorsport	11	0	0	0	0	1	22nd
2005	ADAC Volkswagen Polo Cup	Volkswagen Motorsport	10	6	4	3	7	395	**1st**
2006	SEAT León Supercopa Germany	GAG Racing Team	15	3	3	2	8	185	**2nd**
2007	Porsche Carrera Cup Germany	MRS-Team	9	0	0	0	1	54	10th
2007	Porsche Supercup	MRS-Team	1	0	0	0	0	0	NC†
2008	Porsche Carrera Cup Germany	MRS-Team	9	1	3	1	6	139	**1st**
2008	Porsche Supercup	Veltins MRS Racing	11	0	4	1	1	95	6th
2009	Porsche Supercup	Veltins MRS Racing	13	6	5	6	10	207	**2nd**
2010	Porsche Supercup	Al Faisal Lechner Racing	10	4	4	1	7	152	**1st**
2010	ADAC GT Masters	Mühlner Motorsport	4	1	0	1	1	20	17th
2010	ADAC GT Masters	Pole Promotion	2	0	0	0	0	20	17th
2010	Volkswagen Scirocco R-Cup	Volkswagen Motorsport	2	2	1	1	2	0	NC†
2010	Porsche Carrera Cup Germany	Farnbacher Racing	2	0	1	0	0	0	NC†
2011	Porsche Supercup	Veltins Lechner Racing	11	5	3	3	8	181	**1st**
2011	Porsche Carrera World Cup	Veltins Lechner Racing	1	1	0	1	1	N/A	**1st**
2011	ADAC GT Masters	Phoenix Racing Pole Promotion	12	1	0	0	3	69	15th
2011	Porsche Carrera Cup Germany	Förch Racing	8	1	0	1	5	93	5th
2011	American Le Mans Series - GT	Paul Miller Racing	1	0	0	0	0	0	NC
2011	24 Hours of Nürburgring - SP8T	Volkswagen Motorsport	1	0	0	0	0	N/A	DNF
2012	Porsche Supercup	Lechner Racing	8	5	4	4	7	142	**1st**
2012	Porsche Carrera Cup Germany	Team Deutsche Post by tolimit	17	6	5	7	12	242	**1st**
2012	ADAC GT Masters	Mamerow Racing	7	1	0	0	2	50	16th
2012	Blancpain Endurance Series - Pro	Audi Sport Team Phoenix	2	1	0	0	1	46	9th
2012	24 Hours of Nürburgring - SP9	Audi Sport Team Phoenix	1	0	0	0	0	N/A	5th
2012	Rolex Sports Car Series - GT	Magnus Racing	1	1	0	0	1	35	49th
2013	FIA GT Series	Belgian Audi Club Team WRT	10	2	3	2	5	80	6th
2013	Blancpain Endurance Series - Pro	Belgian Audi Club Team WRT	5	0	0	0	1	24	14th
2013	ADAC GT Masters	Prosperia C. Abt Racing	16	2	1	2	5	146	6th
2013	Dacia Logan Cup Germany	Pronghorn-Racing	6	5	3	4	6	5067	**1st**
2013	Rolex Sports Car Series - GT	APR Motorsport LTD.UK	1	0	0	0	1	32	49th
2013	Pirelli World Challenge - GT	Swisher Racing	1	0	0	0	0	85	24th
2013	24 Hours of Nürburgring - SP9	Prosperia-C. Abt Team Mamerow	1	0	0	0	0	N/A	?
2014	ADAC GT Masters	Prosperia C. Abt Racing	16	3	4	3	9	214	**1st**
2014	Blancpain Sprint Series - Cup	Belgian Audi Club Team WRT	14	1	0	4	3	71	5th
2014	Blancpain Endurance Series - Pro	Belgian Audi Club Team WRT	1	1	0	0	1	43	10th
2014	United SportsCar Championship - GTD	Paul Miller Racing	1	0	1	0	0	18	87th
2014	FIA World Endurance Championship - LMP2	Sébastien Loeb Racing	1	0	0	0	0	0	NC†
2014	24 Hours of Le Mans - LMP2	Sébastien Loeb Racing	1	0	0	0	0	N/A	4th
2014	24 Hours of Nürburgring - SP9	Phoenix Racing	1	1	0	0	1	N/A	**1st**
2015	Blancpain Endurance Series - Pro	Belgian Audi Club Team WRT	2	0	0	0	0	0	NC
2015	FIA GT World Cup	Belgian Audi Club Team WRT	1	0	0	0	1	N/A	**2nd**
2015	FIA World Endurance Championship	Audi Sport Team Joest	2	0	0	0	0	24	12th
2015	24 Hours of Le Mans	Audi Sport Team Joest	1	0	0	0	0	N/A	7th
2015	Audi Sport TT Cup	Audi Sport	2	1	1	0	1	0	NC†
2015	United SportsCar Championship - GTD	Paul Miller Racing	1	0	0	0	0	27	38th
2015	24 Hours of Nürburgring - SP9	Audi Sport Team Phoenix	1	0	0	0	0	N/A	DNF
2015–16	Formula E	Team Aguri	1	0	0	0	0	0	23rd
2016	Blancpain GT Series Sprint Cup	Belgian Audi Club Team WRT	8	0	0	0	3	39	9th
2016	Blancpain GT Series Endurance Cup	Belgian Audi Club Team WRT	2	0	1	1	1	18	24th
2016	FIA World Endurance Championship - LMP2	G-Drive Racing	7	1	4	3	4	111	5th
2016	24 Hours of Le Mans - LMP2	G-Drive Racing	1	0	0	0	1	N/A	**2nd**
2016	Deutsche Tourenwagen Masters	Audi Sport Team Rosberg	1	0	0	0	0	8	23rd
2016	Deutsche Tourenwagen Masters	Audi Sport Team Phoenix	2	0	0	0	0	8	23rd
2016	IMSA SportsCar Championship - GTD	Magnus Racing	1	1	0	0	1	36	35th
2016	Intercontinental GT Challenge	Melbourne Performance Centre	1	0	0	0	0	44	**2nd**
2016	Intercontinental GT Challenge	Audi Sport Team WRT	1	0	1	1	1	44	**2nd**
2016	Intercontinental GT Challenge	Audi Sport Team Phoenix	1	0	0	1	1	44	**2nd**
2016	24 Hours of Nürburgring - SP9	Twin Busch Motorsport	1	0	0	0	0	N/A	10th
2017	Deutsche Tourenwagen Masters	Audi Sport Team Rosberg	18	3	3	4	5	179	**1st**
2017	Blancpain GT Series Endurance Cup	Audi Sport Team WRT	2	0	0	0	1	29	10th
2017	Intercontinental GT Challenge	Audi Sport Team WRT	1	0	0	0	0	8	12th
2017	24 Hours of Nürburgring - SP9	Audi Sport Team WRT	1	0	0	0	1	N/A	**3rd**
2017	IMSA SportsCar Championship - Prototype	VisitFlorida Racing	2	0	0	0	1	55	23rd
2018	Deutsche Tourenwagen Masters	Audi Sport Team Rosberg	19	7	2	1	9	251	**2nd**
2018	IMSA SportsCar Championship - Prototype	Mazda Team Joest	3	0	0	1	0	55	35th
2018	World Touring Car Cup	Audi Sport Team WRT	2	0	0	0	0	10	28th
2018	Blancpain GT Series Endurance Cup	Audi Sport Team WRT	1	0	0	0	0	8	39th
2018	Intercontinental GT Challenge	Audi Sport Team WRT	1	0	1	0	0	12	18th
2018	24 Hours of Nürburgring - SP9	Audi Sport Team Land	1	0	0	0	0	N/A	5th
2019	Deutsche Tourenwagen Masters	Audi Sport Team Rosberg	18	7	8	2	13	322	**1st**
2019	Blancpain GT Series Endurance Cup	Audi Sport Team WRT	1	0	0	0	0	3	32nd
2019	Intercontinental GT Challenge	Audi Sport Team WRT	1	0	0	0	0	0	NC
2019	IMSA SportsCar Championship - DPi	Mazda Team Joest	1	0	1	0	0	20	35th
2019	24 Hours of Nürburgring - SP9	Audi Sport Team Car Collection	1	0	0	0	1	N/A	**3rd**
2019–20	Formula E	Audi Sport ABT Schaeffler	6	0	0	0	1	29	15th
2020	Deutsche Tourenwagen Masters	Audi Sport Team Rosberg	18	7	7	7	13	353	**1st**
2020	24 Hours of Nürburgring - SP9	Audi Sport Team Land	1	0	0	0	0	N/A	6th
2020–21	Formula E	Audi Sport ABT Schaeffler	15	0	0	2	1	78	13th
2021	24 Hours of Nürburgring - SP9	Audi Sport Team Land	1	0	0	0	0	N/A	DNF
2022	Deutsche Tourenwagen Masters	Team Abt	16	1	3	0	6	149	**3rd**
2022	FIA World Endurance Championship - LMP2	WRT	5	2	1	1	3	91	6th
2022	24 Hours of Le Mans - LMP2	WRT	1	0	1	0	0	N/A	DNF
2022	IMSA SportsCar Championship - LMP2	G-Drive Racing with APR	1	0	0	0	0	0	NC†
2022	24 Hours of Nürburgring - SP9	Audi Sport Team Car Collection	1	0	0	0	0	N/A	4th
2022–23	Formula E	Neom McLaren Formula E Team	16	0	0	1	1	40	13th
2023	Deutsche Tourenwagen Masters	Schubert Motorsport	14	1	2	1	4	140	5th
2023	24 Hours of Le Mans - LMP2	Tower Motorsports	1	0	0	0	0	N/A	DNF
2024	Deutsche Tourenwagen Masters	Schubert Motorsport	16	2	0	0	4	172	4th
2024	FIA World Endurance Championship - Hypercar	BMW M Team WRT	8	0	0	0	0	10	27th
2024	IMSA SportsCar Championship - GTP	BMW M Team RLL	1	0	0	0	0	268	29th
2025	Deutsche Tourenwagen Masters	Schubert Motorsport	16	3	1	2	5	169	6th
2025	FIA World Endurance Championship - Hypercar	BMW M Team WRT	8	0	0	0	1	47	9th
2025	IMSA SportsCar Championship - GTP	BMW M Team RLL	1	0	0	1	0	269	36th
2025	GT World Challenge Europe Endurance Cup	Team WRT	1	0	0	0	0	0	NC
2026	FIA World Endurance Championship - Hypercar	BMW M Team WRT	8	1	0	0	2	81	5th
2026	IMSA SportsCar Championship - GTP	BMW M Team WRT	1	0	0	0	1	323	29th

^{†} As Rast was a guest driver, he was ineligible to score points.

=== Complete Porsche Supercup results ===
(key) (Races in bold indicate pole position) (Races in italics indicate fastest lap)

Year	Team	1	2	3	4	5	6	7	8	9	10	11	12	13	DC	Points
2007	Veltins MRS Racing	BHR	BHR	CAT	MON	MAG	SIL	NÜR; 13	HUN	IST	SPA	MNZ			NC‡	0‡
2008	Veltins MRS Racing	**BHR**; Ret	**BHR**; 3	CAT; 5	IST; Ret	MON; 7	MAG; Ret	SIL	HOC; 5	HUN; 8	VAL; 6	**SPA**; 7	**MNZ**; 8		6th	95
2009	Veltins MRS Racing	BHR; Ret	BHR; 2	CAT; DSQ	MON; 2	IST; 2	**SIL**; 1	**NÜR**; 1	**HUN**; 1	**VAL**; 1	SPA; 17†	**MNZ**; 1	YMC; 1	YMC; 2	2nd	207
2010	Al Faisal Lechner Racing	**BHR**; 1	**BHR**; 1	CAT; Ret	**MON**; 1	**VAL**; 1	SIL; 2	HOC; Ret	HUN; 3	SPA; 3	MNZ; 4				1st	152
2011	Veltins Lechner Racing	IST; 5	CAT; 7	**MON**; 1	NÜR; 1	**SIL**; 1	NÜR; 1	HUN; Ret	SPA; 2	MNZ; 2	YMC; 2	**YMC**; 1			1st	181
2012	Lechner Racing	BHR; 1	BHR; 3	MON; Ret	**VAL**; 1	SIL; 1	**HOC**; 1	**HUN**; DNS	**HUN**; DNS	SPA; 2	MNZ; 1				1st	142

^{†} Did not finish the race, but was classified as he completed over 90% of the race distance. ^{‡} As Rast was a guest driver, he was ineligible to score points.

=== Complete 24 Hours of Spa results ===
Year	Team	Co-Drivers	Car	Class	Laps	Pos.	Class Pos.
2012	(Germany) Audi Sport Performance Team	(Germany) Frank Stippler (Italy) Andrea Piccini	Audi R8 LMS ultra	GT3; Pro	509	**1st**	**1st**
2013	(Belgium) Belgian Audi Club Team WRT	(Monaco) Stéphane Ortelli (Belgium) Laurens Vanthoor	Audi R8 LMS ultra	Pro	79	DNF	DNF
2014	(Belgium) Belgian Audi Club Team WRT	(Belgium) Laurens Vanthoor (Germany) Markus Winkelhock	Audi R8 LMS ultra	Pro	527	**1st**	**1st**
2015	(Belgium) Belgian Audi Club Team WRT	(Belgium) Laurens Vanthoor (Germany) Markus Winkelhock	Audi R8 LMS ultra	Pro	508	21st	11th
2016	(Belgium) Belgian Audi Club Team WRT	(Switzerland) Nico Müller (Belgium) Laurens Vanthoor	Audi R8 LMS	Pro	531	**3rd**	**3rd**
2017	(Belgium) Belgian Audi Club Team WRT	(Spain) Antonio Garcia (Switzerland) Nico Müller	Audi R8 LMS	Pro	546	6th	6th
2018	(Belgium) Audi Sport Team WRT	(Netherlands) Robin Frijns (Switzerland) Nico Müller	Audi R8 LMS	Pro	509	8th	8th
2019	(Belgium) Audi Sport Team WRT	(Netherlands) Robin Frijns (Switzerland) Nico Müller	Audi R8 LMS	Pro	358	23rd	20th
2025	(Belgium) Team WRT	(Italy) Valentino Rossi (Denmark) Kevin Magnussen	BMW M4 GT3 Evo	Pro	548	11th	10th

=== Complete FIA GT Series results ===
Year	Team	Car	Class	1	2	3	4	5	6	7	8	9	10	11	12	Pos.	Points
2013	Belgian Audi Club Team WRT	Audi R8 LMS ultra	Pro	**NOG**; **QR**; 2	NOG; CR; 6	ZOL; QR; 3	ZOL; CR; 5	ZAN; QR; 3	ZAN; CR; Ret	**SVK**; **QR**; 5	SVK; CR; 2	NAV; QR	NAV; CR	**BAK**; **QR**; 1	**BAK**; **CR**; 15	6th	80

=== Complete FIA World Endurance Championship results ===
Year	Entrant	Class	Chassis	Engine	1	2	3	4	5	6	7	8	9	Rank	Points
2014	Sébastien Loeb Racing	LMP2	Oreca 03R	Nissan VK45DE 4.5 L V8	SIL	SPA	LMS; 4	COA	FUJ	SHA	BHR	SÃO		NC†	0†
2015	Audi Sport Team Joest	LMP1	Audi R18 e-tron quattro	Audi TDI 4.0 L Turbo V6 (Hybrid Diesel)	SIL	SPA; 4	LMS; 7	NÜR	COA	FUJ	SHA	BHR		12th	24
2016	G-Drive Racing	LMP2	Oreca 05	Nissan VK45DE 4.5 L V8	**SIL**; 3	**SPA**; 5	**LMS**; 2	**NÜR**; Ret	MEX; 7	COA; 3	FUJ	SHA	BHR; 1	5th	111
2022	WRT	LMP2	Oreca 07	Gibson GK428 4.2 L V8	SEB; 2	SPA; 1	**LMS**; Ret	MNZ; 12	FUJ	BHR; 1				6th	91
2024	BMW M Team WRT	Hypercar	BMW M Hybrid V8	BMW P66/3 4.0 L Turbo V8	QAT; 10	IMO; 6	SPA; 13	LMS; NC	SÃO; 14	COA; 13	FUJ; Ret	BHR; Ret		27th	10
2025	BMW M Team WRT	Hypercar	BMW M Hybrid V8	BMW P66/3 4.0 L Turbo V8	QAT; 7	IMO; 2	SPA; Ret	LMS; 16	SÃO; 5	COA; NC	FUJ; 8	BHR; 8		9th	47
2026	BMW M Team WRT	Hypercar	BMW M Hybrid V8	BMW P66/3 4.0 L Turbo V8	IMO; 5	SPA; 1	LMS; 2	SÃO; 8	COA; 12	FUJ; 13	CAT; 14	MNZ; 7		5th	81

^{†} As Rast was a guest driver, he was ineligible for points.

=== 24 Hours of Le Mans results ===
Year	Team	Co-Drivers	Car	Class	Laps	Pos.	Class Pos.
2014	(France) Sébastien Loeb Racing	(Czech Republic) Jan Charouz (France) Vincent Capillaire	Oreca 03R-Nissan	LMP2	354	8th	4th
2015	(Germany) Audi Sport Team Joest	(Italy) Marco Bonanomi (Portugal) Filipe Albuquerque	Audi R18 e-tron quattro	LMP1	387	7th	7th
2016	(Russia) G-Drive Racing	(Russia) Roman Rusinov (United Kingdom) Will Stevens	Oreca 05-Nissan	LMP2	357	6th	**2nd**
2022	(Belgium) WRT	(Netherlands) Robin Frijns (Indonesia) Sean Gelael	Oreca 07-Gibson	LMP2	285	DNF	DNF
2023	(Canada) Tower Motorsports	(United States) Ricky Taylor (United States) Steven Thomas	Oreca 07-Gibson	LMP2	19	DNF	DNF
2023	(Canada) Tower Motorsports	(United States) Ricky Taylor (United States) Steven Thomas	Oreca 07-Gibson	LMP2 Pro-Am	19	DNF	DNF
2024	(Belgium) BMW M Team WRT	(Netherlands) Robin Frijns (South Africa) Sheldon van der Linde	BMW M Hybrid V8	Hypercar	96	NC	NC
2025	(Germany) BMW M Team WRT	(Netherlands) Robin Frijns (South Africa) Sheldon van der Linde	BMW M Hybrid V8	Hypercar	375	17th	17th
2026	(Germany) BMW M Team WRT	(Netherlands) Robin Frijns (South Africa) Sheldon van der Linde	BMW M Hybrid V8	Hypercar	381	**2nd**	**2nd**

=== Complete IMSA SportsCar Championship results ===
Year	Entrant	Class	Chassis	Engine	1	2	3	4	5	6	7	8	9	10	11	Rank	Points
2014	Paul Miller Racing	GTD	Audi R8 LMS ultra	Audi 5.2L V10	**DAY**; 16	SEB	LGA	DET	WGL	MOS	IMS	ELK	VIR	COA	PET	87th	18
2015	Paul Miller Racing	GTD	Audi R8 LMS ultra	Audi 5.2L V10	DAY; 5	SEB	LGA	DET	WGL	LIM	ELK	VIR	COA	PET		38th	27
2016	Magnus Racing	GTD	Audi R8 LMS	Audi 5.2L V10	DAY; 1	SEB	LGA	DET	WGL	MOS	LIM	ELK	VIR	COA	PET	35th	36
2017	VisitFlorida Racing	P	Riley Mk. 30	Gibson GK428 4.2 L V8	DAY; 3	SEB; 6	LBH	COA	DET	WGL	MOS	ELK	LGA	PET		23rd	55
2018	Mazda Team Joest	P	Mazda RT24-P	Mazda MZ-2.0T 2.0 L Turbo I4	DAY; 17	SEB; 8	LBH	MDO	DET	WGL; 13	MOS	ELK	LGA	PET		35th	55
2019	Mazda Team Joest	DPi	Mazda RT24-P	Mazda MZ-2.0T 2.0 L Turbo I4	**DAY**; 11	SEB	LBH	MDO	DET	WGL	MOS	ELK	LGA	PET		35th	20
2022	G-Drive Racing by APR	LMP2	Aurus 01	Gibson GK428 V8	DAY; 5†	SEB	LGA	MDO	WGL	ELK	PET					NC†	0†
2024	BMW M Team RLL	GTP	BMW M Hybrid V8	BMW P66/3 4.0 L Turbo V8	DAY; 7	SEB	LBH	LGA	DET	WGL	ELK	IMS	PET			29th	268
2025	BMW M Team RLL	GTP	BMW M Hybrid V8	BMW P66/3 4.0 L turbo V8	DAY; 7	SEB	LBH	LGA	DET	WGL	ELK	IMS	PET			36th	269
2026	BMW M Team WRT	GTP	BMW M Hybrid V8	BMW P66/3 4.0 L turbo V8	DAY; 3	SEB	LBH	LGA	DET	WGL	ELK	IMS	PET			29th	323

^{†} Points only counted towards the Michelin Endurance Cup, and not the overall LMP2 Championship.

=== Complete Blancpain GT Series Sprint Cup results ===
Year	Team	Car	Class	1	2	3	4	5	6	7	8	9	10	11	12	13	14	Pos.	Points
2014	Belgian Audi Club Team WRT	Audi R8 LMS ultra	Pro	NOG; QR; DSQ	NOG; CR; 7	BRH; QR; 14	BRH; CR; 9	ZAN; QR; 4	ZAN; CR; 1	SVK; QR; 9	SVK; CR; 3	ALG; QR; 3	ALG; CR; 5	ZOL; QR; 4	ZOL; CR; Ret	BAK; QR; 4	BAK; CR; Ret	5th	71
2016	Belgian Audi Club Team WRT	Audi R8 LMS	Pro	MIS; QR; 14	MIS; CR; Ret	BRH; QR	BRH; CR	NÜR; QR; 3	NÜR; CR; 2	HUN; QR; 10	HUN; CR; 3	CAT; QR; 5	CAT; CR; 18					9th	39

=== Complete Formula E results ===
(key) (Races in bold indicate pole position; races in italics indicate fastest lap)

Year	Team	Chassis	Powertrain	1	2	3	4	5	6	7	8	9	10	11	12	13	14	15	16	Pos	Points
2015–16	Team Aguri	Spark SRT01-e	SRT01-e	BEI	PUT	PDE	BUE	MEX	LBH	PAR	BER; NC	LDN	LDN							23rd	0
2019–20	Audi Sport ABT Schaeffler	Spark SRT05e	Audi e-tron FE06	DIR	DIR	SCL	MEX	MRK	BER; 10	BER; 13	BER; Ret	BER; 16	BER; 3	BER; 4						15th	29
2020–21	Audi Sport ABT Schaeffler	Spark SRT05e	Audi e-tron FE07	DIR; 4	DIR; 17	RME; 6	RME; Ret	VLC; 5	VLC; 6	MCO; Ret	PUE; 2	PUE; 10	NYC; 10	NYC; 20	LDN; 5	LDN; Ret	BER; 9	BER; 9		13th	78
2022–23	NEOM McLaren Formula E Team	Formula E Gen3	Nissan e-4ORCE 04	MEX; Ret	DRH; 5	DRH; 3	HYD; Ret	CAP; 4	SAP; 9	BER; 17	BER; 13	MCO; 17	JAK; 15	JAK; 15	POR; 14	RME; Ret	RME; 13	LDN; 14	LDN; 12	13th	40

=== Complete Deutsche Tourenwagen Masters results ===
(key) (Races in bold indicate pole position) (Races in italics indicate fastest lap)

Year	Team	Car	1	2	3	4	5	6	7	8	9	10	11	12	13	14	15	16	17	18	19	20	Pos	Points
2016	Audi Sport Team Rosberg	Audi RS5 DTM	HOC; 1	HOC; 2	SPL; 1	SPL; 2	LAU; 1	LAU; 2	NOR; 1	NOR; 2	ZAN; 1	ZAN; 2; 19	MSC; 1	MSC; 2	NÜR; 1	NÜR; 2	HUN; 1	HUN; 2					23rd	8
2016	Audi Sport Team Phoenix	Audi RS5 DTM																	HOC; 1; 6	HOC; 2; 17			23rd	8
2017	Audi Sport Team Rosberg	Audi RS5 DTM	HOC; 1; 6	HOC; 2 Ret	LAU; 1; 3	LAU; 2; 7	**HUN**; **1**; 6	**HUN**; **2**; 1	NOR; 1; 12	NOR; 2 Ret	**MSC**; **1**; 1	MSC; 2; 4	ZAN; 1; 9	ZAN; 2 Ret	NÜR; 1; 5	NÜR; 2; 12	SPL; 1; 13	SPL; 2; 1	HOC; 1; 6	HOC; 2; 2			1st	179
2018	Audi Sport Team Rosberg	Audi RS5 DTM	HOC; 1; 9	HOC; 2; 7	LAU; 1 Ret	LAU; 2 DNS	HUN; 1; 4	HUN; 2; 10	NOR; 1; 16	NOR; 2; 14	ZAN; 1; 17	ZAN; 2; 1	BRH; 1; 4	BRH; 2; 3	MIS; 1 Ret	MIS; 2; 3	**NÜR**; **1**; 1	**NÜR**; **2**; 1	SPL; 1; 1	SPL; 2; 1	HOC; 1; 1	HOC; 2; 1	2nd	251
2019	Audi Sport Team Rosberg	Audi RS5 Turbo DTM	HOC; 1; 16†	HOC; 2; 1	ZOL; 1 Ret	ZOL; 2; 1	**MIS**; **1**; 2	**MIS**; **2**; 3	NOR; 1; 1	**NOR**; **2**; 7	ASS; 1; 3	**ASS**; **2**; 5	BRH; 1; 2	**BRH**; **2**; 1	**LAU**; **1** Ret	LAU; 2; 1	**NÜR**; **1**; 1	NÜR; 2; 3	**HOC**; **1**; 1	HOC; 2; 3			1st	322
2020	Audi Sport Team Rosberg	Audi RS5 Turbo DTM	SPA; 1; 5	**SPA**; **2**; 3	LAU; 1; 7	LAU; 2; 1	LAU; 1; 1	LAU; 2; 6	ASS; 1; 5	**ASS**; **2**; 5	NÜR; 1; 2	NÜR; 2; 2	**NÜR**; **1**; 2	NÜR; 2; 3	**ZOL**; **1**; 1	ZOL; 2; 1	**ZOL**; **1**; 1	ZOL; 2; 1	**HOC**; **1**; 2	**HOC**; **2**; 1			1st	353
2022	Team Abt	Audi R8 LMS Evo II	ALG; 1 Ret	ALG; 2; 12	LAU; 1; 8	LAU; 2; 3^{2}	**IMO**; **1**; 1^{1}	IMO; 2 Ret	NOR; 1; 3	NOR; 2; 3	NÜR; 1; 9	NÜR; 2 Ret	SPA; 1; 4	**SPA**; **2** Ret^{1}	RBR; 1; 2^{1}	RBR; 2; 10	HOC; 1; 5	**HOC**; **2**; 2^{1}					3rd	149
2023	Schubert Motorsport	BMW M4 GT3	OSC; 1; 5	OSC; 2 Ret	ZAN; 1	ZAN; 2	NOR; 1; 2	**NOR**; **2**; 2^{1}	NÜR; 1; 20	NÜR; 2; 19	LAU; 1; 8	LAU; 2; 11	SAC; 1; 8	SAC; 2; 8	RBR; 1; 4	**RBR**; **2**; 1^{1}	HOC; 1 Ret	HOC; 2; 3					5th	140
2024	Schubert Motorsport	BMW M4 GT3	OSC; 1; 7	OSC; 2; 7	LAU; 1 Ret	LAU; 2; 6	ZAN; 1; 2	ZAN; 2; 7	NOR; 1; 1	NOR; 2; 5	NÜR; 1; 11	NÜR; 2; 17	SAC; 1; 7	SAC; 2; 9	RBR; 1; 9	RBR; 2; 1^{3}	HOC; 1; 7	HOC; 2; 3					4th	172
2025	Schubert Motorsport	BMW M4 GT3 Evo	OSC; 1 Ret	OSC; 2; 5	LAU; 1; 3	LAU; 2; 2	ZAN; 1 Ret	**ZAN**; **2**; 1^{1}	NOR; 1; 10	NOR; 2; 7	NÜR; 1; 14	NÜR; 2; 1	SAC; 1; 14	SAC; 2; 5	RBR; 1; 1^{2}	RBR; 2; 13	HOC; 1; 7	HOC; 2 Ret					6th	169

^{†} Did not finish the race, but was classified as he completed over 90% of the race distance.

Sporting positions
Preceded by Matthias Meyer	ADAC Volkswagen Polo Cup; Champion; 2005	Succeeded by Jimmy Johansson
Preceded by Uwe Alzen	Porsche Carrera Cup Germany; Champion; 2008	Succeeded by Thomas Jäger
Preceded by Jeroen Bleekemolen	Porsche Supercup; Champion; 2010-2012	Succeeded by Nicki Thiim
Preceded by Inaugural	Porsche Carrera World Cup; Winner; 2011	Succeeded by None (Race not held since)
Preceded by Nick Tandy	Porsche Carrera Cup Germany; Champion; 2012	Succeeded by Kévin Estre
Preceded by Diego Alessi; Daniel Keilwitz	ADAC GT Masters; Champion; 2014; With: Kelvin van der Linde	Succeeded by Sebastian Asch; Luca Ludwig
Preceded by Marco Wittmann	Deutsche Tourenwagen Masters; Champion; 2017	Succeeded by Gary Paffett
Preceded by Sebastian Vettel	Race of Champions Nations' Cup; 2018; With: Timo Bernhard	Succeeded by Tom Kristensen; Johan Kristoffersson
Preceded by Gary Paffett	Deutsche Tourenwagen Masters; Champion; 2019-2020	Succeeded by Maximilian Götz
