= 2018 Deutsche Tourenwagen Masters =

German touring car championship

Champions
- Drivers' Champion: Gary Paffett
- Teams' Champion: HWA Team I
- Manufacturers' Championship: Mercedes-Benz

Seasons
- ← 2017 2019 →

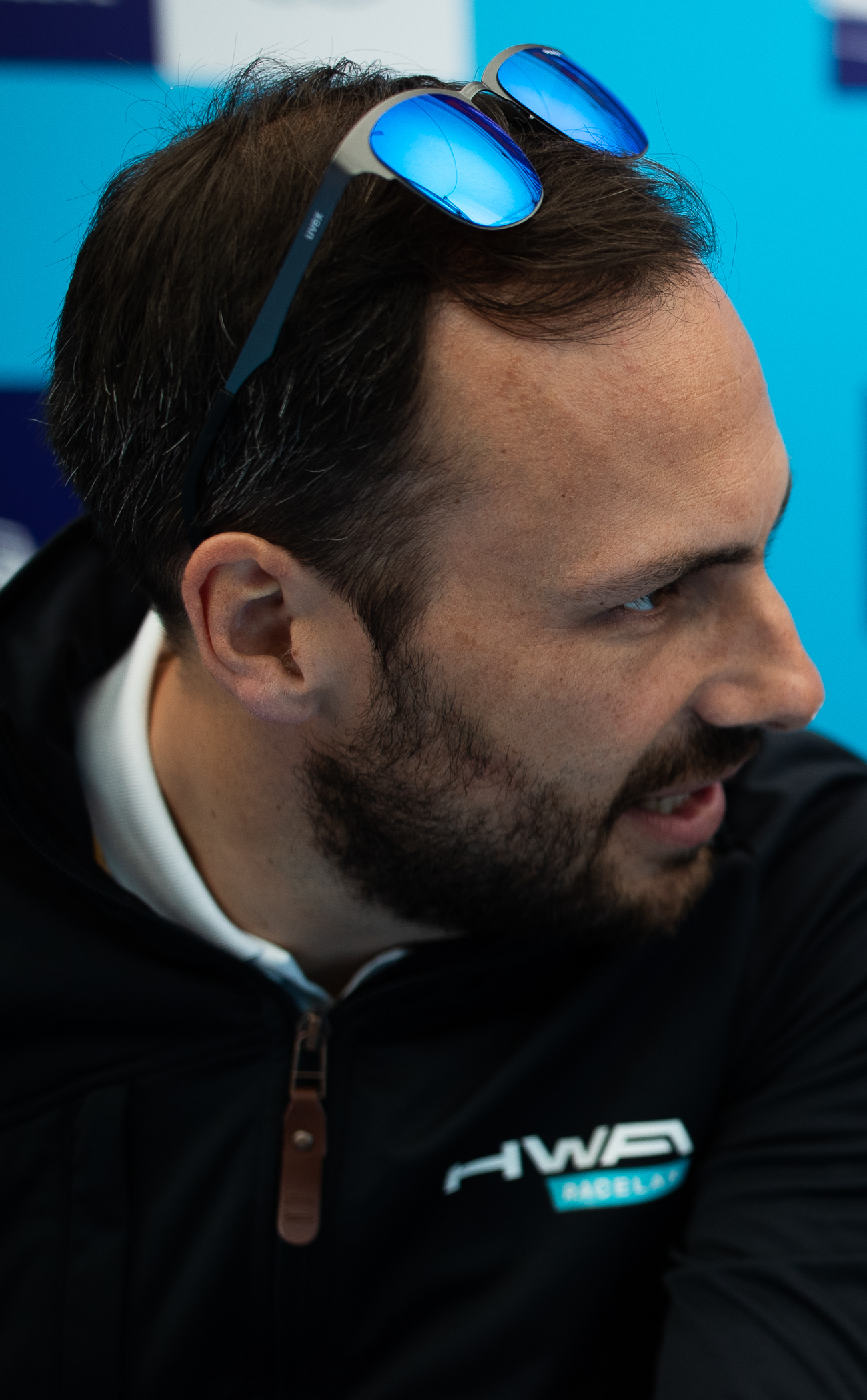
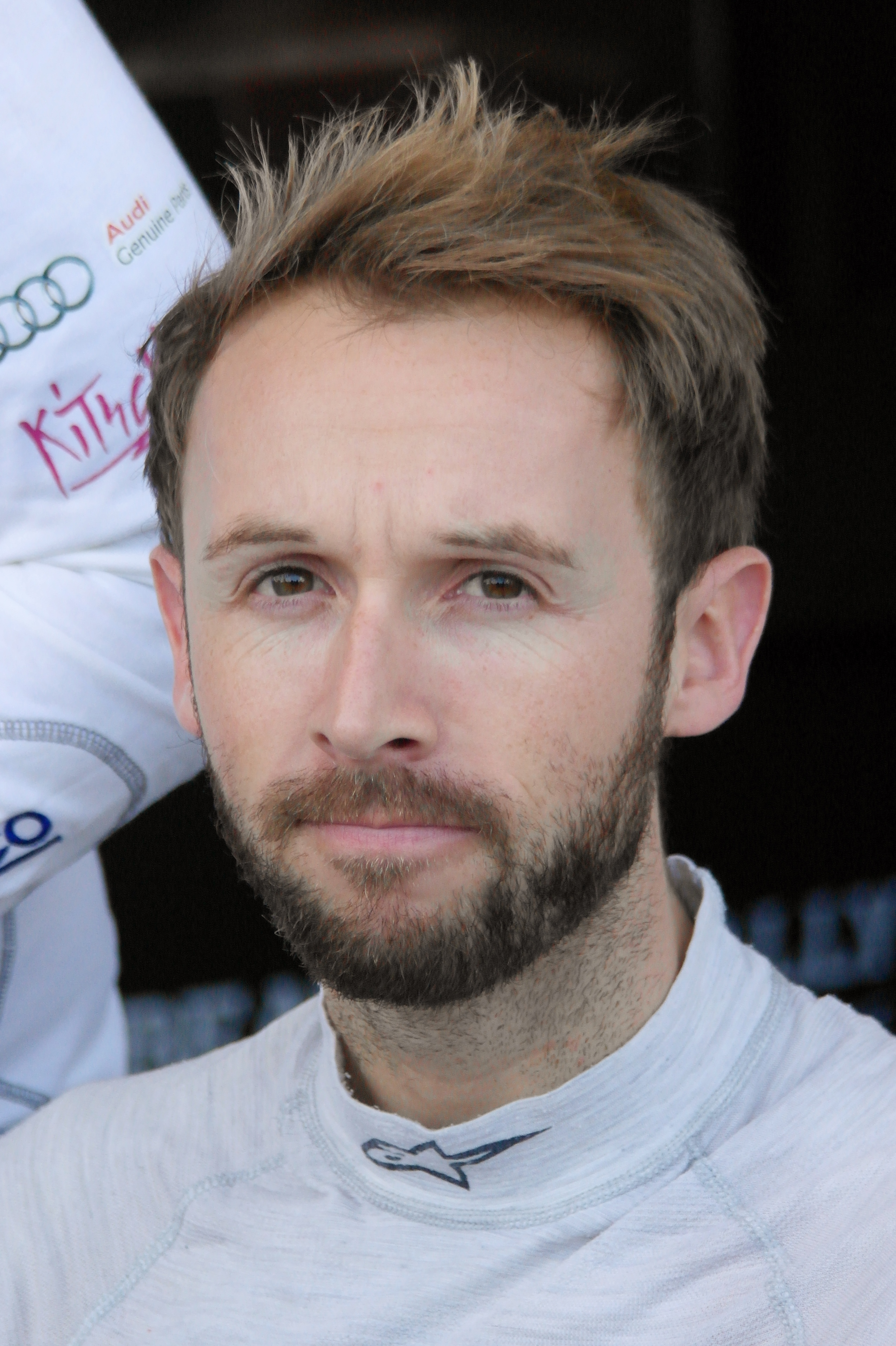
Gary Paffett (left) won his second Drivers' Championship while 2017 DTM champion René Rast (right) finished second in the championship.

The 2018 Deutsche Tourenwagen Masters was the thirty-second season of premier German touring car championship and also nineteenth season under the moniker of Deutsche Tourenwagen Masters since the series' resumption in 2000. 2018 would be the final season for the traditional 4.0-litre V8 naturally-aspirated engine package that debuted in the inaugural reborn season; as the brand new engine package has been introduced for the following season as part of the "Class 1 Project" prospect with Japanese Super GT GT500 cars. 2018 also marked the final season for Mercedes-Benz in DTM due to Mercedes-Benz departing to FIA Formula E from the 2019–20 season and thus ended its 19-year participation.

Gary Paffett won his second title at the final round of the season with a third-place finish, beating previous champion René Rast by four points despite a late charge to six consecutive wins by Rast, a new series record. Paffett became the second non-German driver to have won more than one DTM driver title, and thus repeating Swedish driver Mattias Ekström's feat in 2004 and 2007 seasons.

Mercedes-Benz won the manufacturer's championship for the first time since 2010.

== Rule changes for 2018 ==
=== Sporting ===
- The additional wildcard entry is introduced for the first time ever, but ineligible for championship points even if they finish in top 10.

=== Technical ===
- Aerodynamic downforce aids, such as side winglets and side fences, has been enforced to all cars, in order to improve competition. As a result, the minimum weight of all cars has been reduced from 2,480 lb (1,125 kg) to 2,458 lb (1,115 kg).
- The quantity of engine components a driver may use during the season has been increased from seven complete engines during the entire season, to a new system where each of the engine components are combined. Therefore, in 2018, each driver is permitted to use up to eight set engines.

== Calendar ==
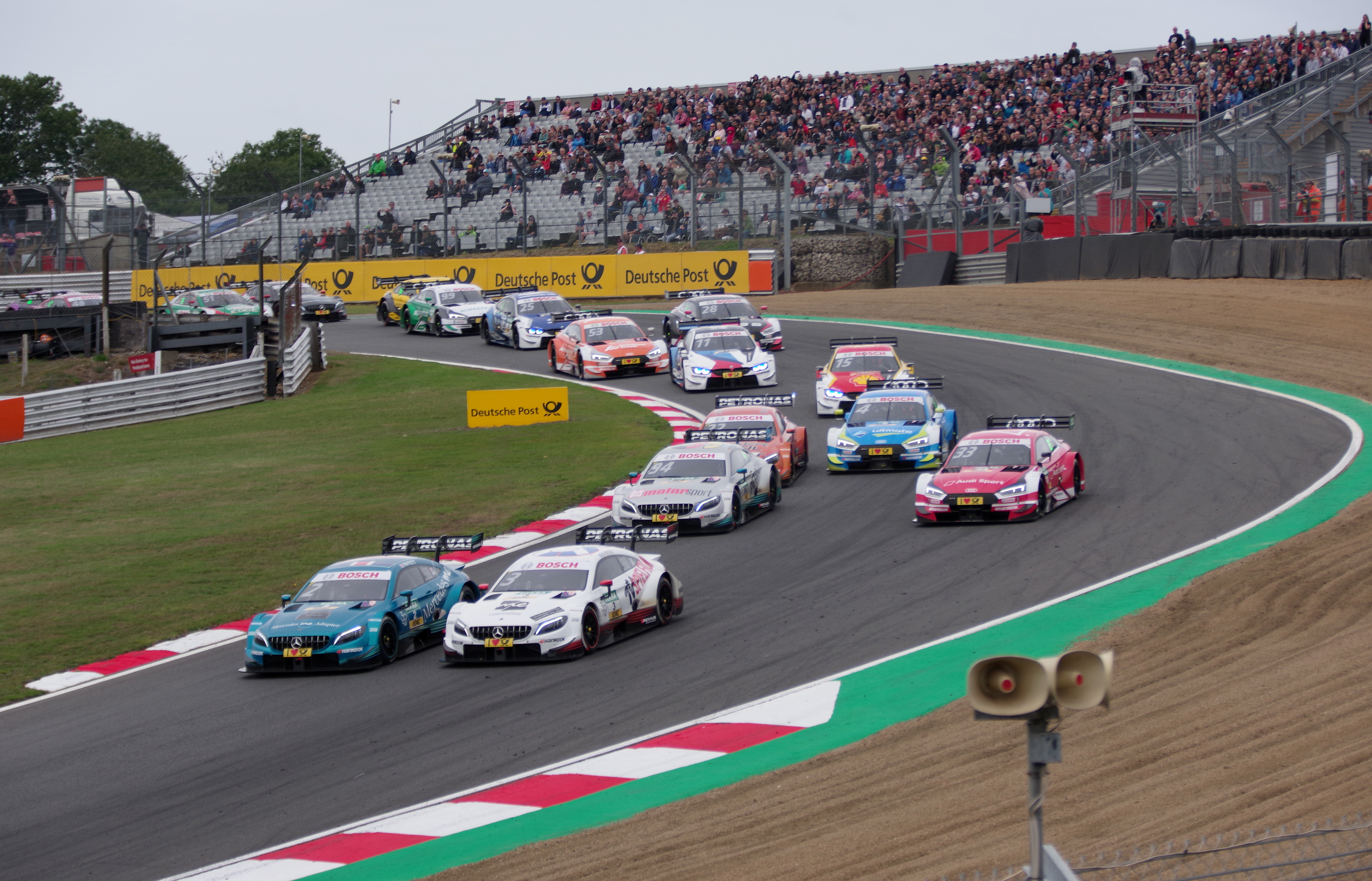
Start of a race at Brands Hatch.

The provisional ten event calendar was announced on 24 November 2017, and later finalized on 18 December 2017.

Round	Circuit	Race 1	Race 2
1	Hockenheimring, Germany	5 May	6 May
2	Lausitzring, Germany	19 May	20 May
3	Hungaroring, Hungary	2 June	3 June
4	Norisring, Germany	23 June	24 June
5	Circuit Zandvoort, Netherlands	14 July	15 July
6	(United Kingdom) Brands Hatch, Great Britain	11 August	12 August
7	Misano World Circuit Marco Simoncelli, Italy	25 August (Note: Night race)	26 August (Note: Night race)
8	Nürburgring, Germany	8 September	9 September
9	Red Bull Ring, Austria	22 September	23 September
10	Hockenheimring, Germany	13 October	14 October

=== Calendar changes ===
- The races in Great Britain and Italy are scheduled to return to the DTM schedule for the first time since 2013 and 2010 respectively. On 6 December 2017 it was confirmed that the British round would be held at Brands Hatch, on the circuit's GP layout as opposed to the Indy layout of previous DTM races. Moscow Raceway was dropped from the 2018 schedule. For the first time, Misano will host the round in Italy, as a night-time event. The Lausitzring round will revert to full road course layout after last used in 2004.

== Teams and drivers ==
The following manufacturers, teams and drivers competed in the 2018 Deutsche Tourenwagen Masters. All teams competed with tyres supplied by Hankook.

Key
Full-season entry	Additional/wildcard entry
* Eligible for all championship points	* Ineligible to score Drivers' championship points

Manufacturer	Car	Team	No.	Drivers	Rounds
Mercedes-Benz	Mercedes-AMG C63 DTM	(Germany) Mercedes-AMG Motorsport Petronas	2	(United Kingdom) Gary Paffett	All
Mercedes-Benz	Mercedes-AMG C63 DTM	(Germany) Mercedes-AMG Motorsport Petronas	94	(Germany) Pascal Wehrlein	All
Mercedes-Benz	Mercedes-AMG C63 DTM	(Germany) Mercedes-AMG Motorsport Remus	3	(United Kingdom) Paul di Resta	All
Mercedes-Benz	Mercedes-AMG C63 DTM	(Germany) Mercedes-AMG Motorsport Remus	17	(France) Sébastien Ogier	9
Mercedes-Benz	Mercedes-AMG C63 DTM	(Germany) Mercedes-AMG Motorsport Remus	23	(Spain) Daniel Juncadella	All
Mercedes-Benz	Mercedes-AMG C63 DTM	(Germany) Silberpfeil Energy Mercedes-AMG Motorsport	22	(Austria) Lucas Auer	All
Mercedes-Benz	Mercedes-AMG C63 DTM	(Germany) Silberpfeil Energy Mercedes-AMG Motorsport	48	(Italy) Edoardo Mortara	All
Audi	Audi RS5 DTM	(Germany) Audi Sport Team Abt Sportsline	4	(Netherlands) Robin Frijns	All
Audi	Audi RS5 DTM	(Germany) Audi Sport Team Abt Sportsline	5	(Sweden) Mattias Ekström	1
Audi	Audi RS5 DTM	(Germany) Audi Sport Team Abt Sportsline	51	(Switzerland) Nico Müller	All
Audi	Audi RS5 DTM	(Germany) Audi Sport Team Phoenix	28	(France) Loïc Duval	All
Audi	Audi RS5 DTM	(Germany) Audi Sport Team Phoenix	99	(Germany) Mike Rockenfeller	All
Audi	Audi RS5 DTM	(Germany) Audi Sport Team Rosberg	33	(Germany) René Rast	All
Audi	Audi RS5 DTM	(Germany) Audi Sport Team Rosberg	53	(United Kingdom) Jamie Green	All
BMW	BMW M4 DTM	(Belgium) BMW Team RBM	7	(Canada) Bruno Spengler	All
BMW	BMW M4 DTM	(Belgium) BMW Team RBM	47	(Sweden) Joel Eriksson	All
BMW	BMW M4 DTM	(Germany) BMW Team RMG	11	(Germany) Marco Wittmann	All
BMW	BMW M4 DTM	(Germany) BMW Team RMG	15	(Brazil) Augusto Farfus	All
BMW	BMW M4 DTM	(Belgium) BMW Team RMR	12	(Italy) Alex Zanardi	7
BMW	BMW M4 DTM	(Belgium) BMW Team RMR	16	(Germany) Timo Glock	All
BMW	BMW M4 DTM	(Belgium) BMW Team RMR	25	(Austria) Philipp Eng	All

=== Driver changes ===
- Mattias Ekström left the series after eighteen years, but remains with Audi via its FIA World Rallycross Championship programme. 2017 Blancpain GT Series driver Robin Frijns will make his DTM début with Audi Sport. In addition, the two-time champion made a one-off appearance in the 2018 season opener in Hockenheim with an additional Audi RS 5 to mark his retirement from the series.
- Philipp Eng and Joel Eriksson – both members of BMW's junior team – joined BMW Team RBM, to partner Canadian Bruno Spengler. After five years with BMW Motorsport, Maxime Martin left the marque, and its DTM programme after four years to join Aston Martin Racing in the FIA World Endurance Championship for the 2018–19 season. Tom Blomqvist will also leave the series after three years, but remains with BMW Motorsport via its Formula E and GT programmes.
- After spending two years in Formula One with Manor and Sauber, Pascal Wehrlein returned to the DTM with Mercedes-AMG's HWA Team. After a one-year sabbatical, Daniel Juncadella also returned to the DTM with HWA. Robert Wickens left the series after six years to join Schmidt Peterson Motorsports in the IndyCar Series for the 2018 season. Maro Engel left the series after one season to focus solely on Formula E.
- Former Williams Formula One driver, two-time CART champion and four-time Paralympic gold medallist Alex Zanardi made his DTM début with BMW Motorsport at Misano World Circuit Marco Simoncelli as a guest driver.
- Five-time World Rally Champion Sébastien Ogier made his DTM début with HWA Team as a guest driver at the Red Bull Ring.

== Results ==
Round		Circuit	Pole position	Fastest lap	Winning driver	Winning team	Winning manufacturer	Report
1	R1	(Germany) Hockenheimring	(United Kingdom) Gary Paffett	(Spain) Daniel Juncadella	(United Kingdom) Gary Paffett	Mercedes-AMG Motorsport Petronas	Mercedes-Benz	Report
1	R2	(Germany) Hockenheimring	(Germany) Timo Glock	(United Kingdom) Gary Paffett	(Germany) Timo Glock	BMW Team RMR	BMW	Report
2	R1	(Germany) Lausitzring	(Austria) Lucas Auer	(Spain) Daniel Juncadella	(Italy) Edoardo Mortara	Silberpfeil Energy Mercedes-AMG Motorsport	Mercedes-Benz	Report
2	R2	(Germany) Lausitzring	(Austria) Philipp Eng	(Germany) Marco Wittmann	(United Kingdom) Gary Paffett	Mercedes-AMG Motorsport Petronas	Mercedes-Benz	Report
3	R1	(Hungary) Hungaroring	(United Kingdom) Paul di Resta	(Austria) Lucas Auer	(United Kingdom) Paul di Resta	Mercedes-AMG Motorsport Remus	Mercedes-Benz	Report
3	R2	(Hungary) Hungaroring	(Austria) Lucas Auer	(Spain) Daniel Juncadella	(Germany) Marco Wittmann	BMW Team RMG	BMW	Report
4	R1	(Germany) Norisring	(Italy) Edoardo Mortara	(Spain) Daniel Juncadella	(Italy) Edoardo Mortara	Silberpfeil Energy Mercedes-AMG Motorsport	Mercedes-Benz	Report
4	R2	(Germany) Norisring	(Spain) Daniel Juncadella	(United Kingdom) Jamie Green	(Germany) Marco Wittmann	BMW Team RMG	BMW	Report
5	R1	(Netherlands) Circuit Zandvoort	(United Kingdom) Gary Paffett	(United Kingdom) Gary Paffett	(United Kingdom) Gary Paffett	Mercedes-AMG Motorsport Petronas	Mercedes-Benz	Report
5	R2	(Netherlands) Circuit Zandvoort	(United Kingdom) Gary Paffett	(Germany) Mike Rockenfeller	(Germany) René Rast	Audi Sport Team Rosberg	Audi	Report
6	R1	(United Kingdom) Brands Hatch	(Spain) Daniel Juncadella	(Germany) Marco Wittmann	(Spain) Daniel Juncadella	Mercedes-AMG Motorsport Remus	Mercedes-Benz	Report
6	R2	(United Kingdom) Brands Hatch	(United Kingdom) Gary Paffett	(United Kingdom) Paul di Resta	(United Kingdom) Paul di Resta	Mercedes-AMG Motorsport Remus	Mercedes-Benz	Report
7	R1	(Italy) Misano World Circuit Marco Simoncelli	(United Kingdom) Paul di Resta	(Brazil) Augusto Farfus	(United Kingdom) Paul di Resta	Mercedes-AMG Motorsport Remus	Mercedes-Benz	Report
7	R2	(Italy) Misano World Circuit Marco Simoncelli	(France) Loïc Duval	(Italy) Edoardo Mortara	(Sweden) Joel Eriksson	BMW Team RBM	BMW	Report
8	R1	(Germany) Nürburgring	(Germany) René Rast	(Germany) René Rast	(Germany) René Rast	Audi Sport Team Rosberg	Audi	Report
8	R2	(Germany) Nürburgring	(Germany) René Rast	(United Kingdom) Gary Paffett	(Germany) René Rast	Audi Sport Team Rosberg	Audi	Report
9	R1	(Austria) Red Bull Ring	(Spain) Daniel Juncadella	(Austria) Lucas Auer	(Germany) René Rast	Audi Sport Team Rosberg	Audi	Report
9	R2	(Austria) Red Bull Ring	(United Kingdom) Gary Paffett	(United Kingdom) Gary Paffett	(Germany) René Rast	Audi Sport Team Rosberg	Audi	Report
10	R1	(Germany) Hockenheimring	(Austria) Lucas Auer	(Germany) Timo Glock	(Germany) René Rast	Audi Sport Team Rosberg	Audi	Report
10	R2	(Germany) Hockenheimring	(Germany) Marco Wittmann	(Netherlands) Robin Frijns	(Germany) René Rast	Audi Sport Team Rosberg	Audi	Report

== Championship standings ==
Scoring system

Points were awarded to the top ten classified finishers as follows:

Race Position	**1st**	**2nd**	**3rd**	**4th**	**5th**	**6th**	**7th**	**8th**	**9th**	**10th**
Points	25	18	15	12	10	8	6	4	2	1

Additionally, the top three placed drivers in qualifying also received points:

Qualifying Position	**1st**	**2nd**	**3rd**
Points	3	2	1

=== Drivers' championship ===
Pos.	Driver	HOC (Germany)		LAU (Germany)		HUN (Hungary)		NOR (Germany)		ZAN (Netherlands)		BRH (United Kingdom)		MIS (Italy)		NÜR (Germany)		RBR (Austria)		HOC (Germany)		Points
1	(United Kingdom) Gary Paffett	**1**^{1}	3	9	1^{3}	6	15	2	13^{2}	**1**^{1}	**2**^{1}	6	**2**^{1}	Ret	14	3^{2}	5^{2}	10	**3**^{1}	4^{2}	3^{3}	255
2	(Germany) René Rast	9	7^{2}	Ret	DNS	4	10	16	14	17	1^{3}	4^{3}	3	Ret^{3}	3	**1**^{1}	**1**^{1}	1	1	1	1^{2}	251
3	(United Kingdom) Paul di Resta	7	9	6	4	**1**^{1}	5^{3}	4	6	2^{3}	3	16	1^{2}	**1**^{1}	6	18	2	4	4^{3}	8	14	233
4	(Germany) Marco Wittmann	11^{2}	11	7	2	16	1	3^{3}	1	7	17	9	5	9	13	5	3	7	13	Ret	**2**^{1}	164
5	(Germany) Timo Glock	3^{3}	**1**^{1}	2	5	14	2	10	10	6	10	13	11	7	15	4	16	Ret^{2}	7	3^{3}	10	144
6	(Italy) Edoardo Mortara	4	Ret	1	11	5	DSQ	**1**^{1}	2	13	8	8	17	3^{2}	2^{2}	13	11	16	10	10	13	140
7	(Austria) Lucas Auer	2	15	**4**^{1}	14	2^{3}	**DSQ**^{1}	7	5^{3}	3	9	3^{2}	8	Ret	Ret	11	18†	6	Ret	**Ret**^{1}	DSQ	121
8	(Germany) Pascal Wehrlein	5	6	8	3^{2}	13	12^{2}	13	9	4^{2}	6	7	4^{3}	6	12	7	9	13	6	11	DSQ	108
9	(Austria) Philipp Eng	16	14	3^{2}	**7**^{1}	18	3	5^{2}	11	14	4^{2}	5	7	8	16	16	8^{3}	8	9	12	8	102
10	(Switzerland) Nico Müller	13	13	Ret	17	3^{2}	14	18	7	Ret	7	15	10	5	10	10	14	3	2^{2}	7	4	96
11	(Germany) Mike Rockenfeller	14	2	11	8	11	4	15	16	15	16	10	6	10	9	6	13	2^{3}	8	6	11	87
12	(Canada) Bruno Spengler	6	8	5^{3}	15	12	DSQ	6	4	12	13	17	14	Ret	11	2^{3}	4	Ret	14	9	6	85
13	(Netherlands) Robin Frijns	18	12	13	10	7	8	12	8	5	Ret	12	12	2	4	17	10	11	DSQ	2	5	84
14	(Sweden) Joel Eriksson	12	4^{3}	12	9	17	6	9	12	9	11	14	13	12	1	12	6	15	5	15	9	72
15	(Spain) Daniel Juncadella	8	18	14	12	10	11	8	**3**^{1}	16	12	**1**^{1}	9	14†	17^{3}	15	17†	**14**^{1}	11	14	15	61
16	(Brazil) Augusto Farfus	15	10	10	16	15	7	14	17	8	5	2	Ret	11	Ret	9	7	9	Ret	Ret	7	56
17	(France) Loïc Duval	10	5	Ret	13	8	9	17	18	11	15	Ret	16	4	**7**^{1}	8	12	Ret	15	5	12	54
18	(United Kingdom) Jamie Green	19	17	Ret	6	9	13	11	15	10	14	11	15	Ret	8	14	15	5	12	13	16	27
Guest drivers ineligible for points
	(Italy) Alex Zanardi													13	5							
	(France) Sébastien Ogier																	12	16			
	(Sweden) Mattias Ekström	17	16																			
Pos.	Driver	HOC (Germany)		LAU (Germany)		HUN (Hungary)		NOR (Germany)		ZAN (Netherlands)		BRH (United Kingdom)		MIS (Italy)		NÜR (Germany)		RBR (Austria)		HOC (Germany)		Points

Colour	Result
Gold	Winner
Silver	Second place
Bronze	Third place
Green	Points classification
Blue	Non-points classification
Blue	Non-classified finish (NC)
Purple	Retired, not classified (Ret)
Red	Did not qualify (DNQ)
Red	Did not pre-qualify (DNPQ)
Black	Disqualified (DSQ)
White	Did not start (DNS)
White	Withdrew (WD)
White	Race cancelled (C)
Blank	Did not practice (DNP)
Blank	Did not arrive (DNA)
Blank	Excluded (EX)

**Bold** – Pole
Italics – Fastest Lap
1 – 3 Points for Pole
2 – 2 Points for P2
3 – 1 Point for P3

- † — Driver retired, but was classified as he completed 75% of the winner's race distance.

=== Teams' championship ===
Pos.	Team	Car	HOC (Germany)		LAU (Germany)		HUN (Hungary)		NOR (Germany)		ZAN (Netherlands)		BRH (United Kingdom)		MIS (Italy)		NÜR (Germany)		RBR (Austria)		HOC (Germany)		Points
1	Mercedes-AMG Motorsport Petronas	2	**1**^{1}	3	9	1^{3}	6	15	2	13^{2}	**1**^{1}	**2**^{1}	6	**2**^{1}	Ret	14	3^{2}	5^{2}	10	**3**^{1}	4^{2}	3^{3}	363
1	Mercedes-AMG Motorsport Petronas	94	5	6	8	3^{2}	13	12^{2}	13	9	4^{2}	6	7	4^{3}	6	12	7	9	13	6	11	DSQ	363
2	Mercedes-AMG Motorsport Remus	3	7	9	6	4	**1**^{1}	5^{3}	4	6	2^{3}	3	16	1^{2}	**1**^{1}	6	18	2	4	4^{3}	8	14	294
2	Mercedes-AMG Motorsport Remus	23	8	18	14	12	10	11	8	**3**^{1}	16	12	**1**^{1}	9	14†	17^{3}	15	17†	**14**^{1}	11	14	15	294
3	Audi Sport Team Rosberg	33	9	7^{2}	Ret	DNS	4	10	16	14	17	1^{3}	4^{3}	3	Ret^{3}	3	**1**^{1}	**1**^{1}	1	1	1	1^{2}	278
3	Audi Sport Team Rosberg	53	19	17	Ret	6	9	13	11	15	10	14	11	15	Ret	8	14	15	5	12	13	16	278
4	Silberpfeil Energy Mercedes-AMG Motorsport	22	2	15	**4**^{1}	14	2^{3}	**DSQ**^{1}	7	5^{3}	3	9	3^{2}	8	Ret	Ret	11	18†	6	Ret	**Ret**^{1}	DSQ	261
4	Silberpfeil Energy Mercedes-AMG Motorsport	48	4	Ret	1	11	5	DSQ	**1**^{1}	2	13	8	8	17	3^{2}	2^{2}	13	11	16	10	10	13	261
5	BMW Team RMR	16	3^{3}	**1**^{1}	2	5	14	2	10	10	6	10	13	11	7	15	4	16	Ret^{2}	7	3^{3}	10	246
5	BMW Team RMR	25	16	14	3^{2}	**7**^{1}	18	3	5^{2}	11	14	4^{2}	5	7	8	16	16	8^{3}	8	9	12	8	246
6	BMW Team RMG	11	11^{2}	11	7	2	16	1	3^{3}	1	7	17	9	5	9	13	5	3	7	13	Ret	**2**^{1}	220
6	BMW Team RMG	15	15	10	10	16	15	7	14	17	8	5	2	Ret	11	Ret	9	7	9	Ret	Ret	7	220
7	Audi Sport Team Abt Sportsline	4	18	12	13	10	7	8	12	8	5	Ret	12	12	2	4	17	10	11	DSQ	2	5	180
7	Audi Sport Team Abt Sportsline	51	13	13	Ret	17	3^{2}	14	18	7	Ret	7	15	10	5	10	10	14	3	2^{2}	7	4	180
8	BMW Team RBM	7	6	8	5^{3}	15	12	DSQ	6	4	12	13	17	14	Ret	11	2^{3}	4	Ret	14	9	6	157
8	BMW Team RBM	47	12	4^{3}	12	9	17	6	9	12	9	11	14	13	12	1	12	6	15	5	15	9	157
9	Audi Sport Team Phoenix	28	10	5	Ret	13	8	9	17	18	11	15	Ret	16	4	**7**^{1}	8	12	Ret	15	5	12	141
9	Audi Sport Team Phoenix	99	14	2	11	8	11	4	15	16	15	16	10	6	10	9	6	13	2^{3}	8	6	11	141
Pos.	Team	Car	HOC (Germany)		LAU (Germany)		HUN (Hungary)		NOR (Germany)		ZAN (Netherlands)		BRH (United Kingdom)		MIS (Italy)		NÜR (Germany)		RBR (Austria)		HOC (Germany)		Points

=== Manufacturers' championship ===
Pos.	Manufacturer	HOC (Germany)		LAU (Germany)		HUN (Hungary)		NOR (Germany)		ZAN (Netherlands)		BRH (United Kingdom)		MIS (Italy)		NÜR (Germany)		RBR (Austria)		HOC (Germany)		Points
1	Mercedes-Benz	**78**	25	**54**	55	**66**	**16**	**68**	**59**	**76**	**50**	**63**	**67**	**53**	31	8	32	**24**	**40**	**23**	16	903
2	BMW	26	**46**	53	**39**	0	72	39	38	20	25	30	16	12	26	43	46	14	18	18	**42**	623
3	Audi	3	36	0	13	41	19	0	10	11	32	14	24	42	**50**	**41**	**29**	69	49	67	49	599
Pos.	Manufacturer	HOC (Germany)		LAU (Germany)		HUN (Hungary)		NOR (Germany)		ZAN (Netherlands)		BRH (United Kingdom)		MIS (Italy)		NÜR (Germany)		RBR (Austria)		HOC (Germany)		Points

== Bibliography ==
- Upietz, Tim (14 December 2018). DTM 2018: Das offizielle Jahrbuch. Duisburg: Gruppe C Motorsport Verlag. ISBN 978-3-928540-97-1.
