= 2017 Deutsche Tourenwagen Masters =

German touring car championship season

Champions
- Drivers' Champion: René Rast
- Teams' Champion: Team Rosberg
- Manufacturers' Championship: Audi

Seasons
- ← 2016 2018 →

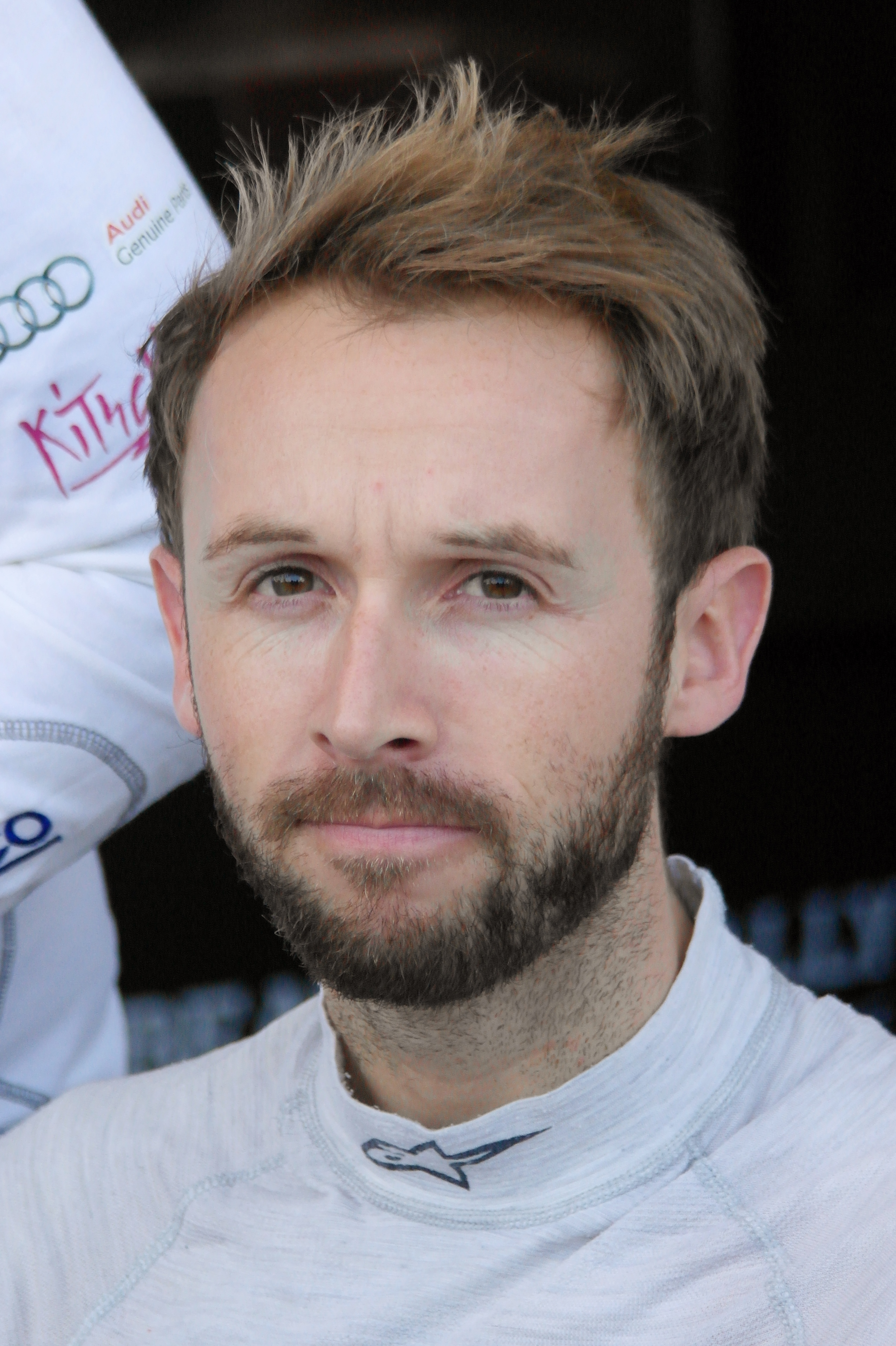
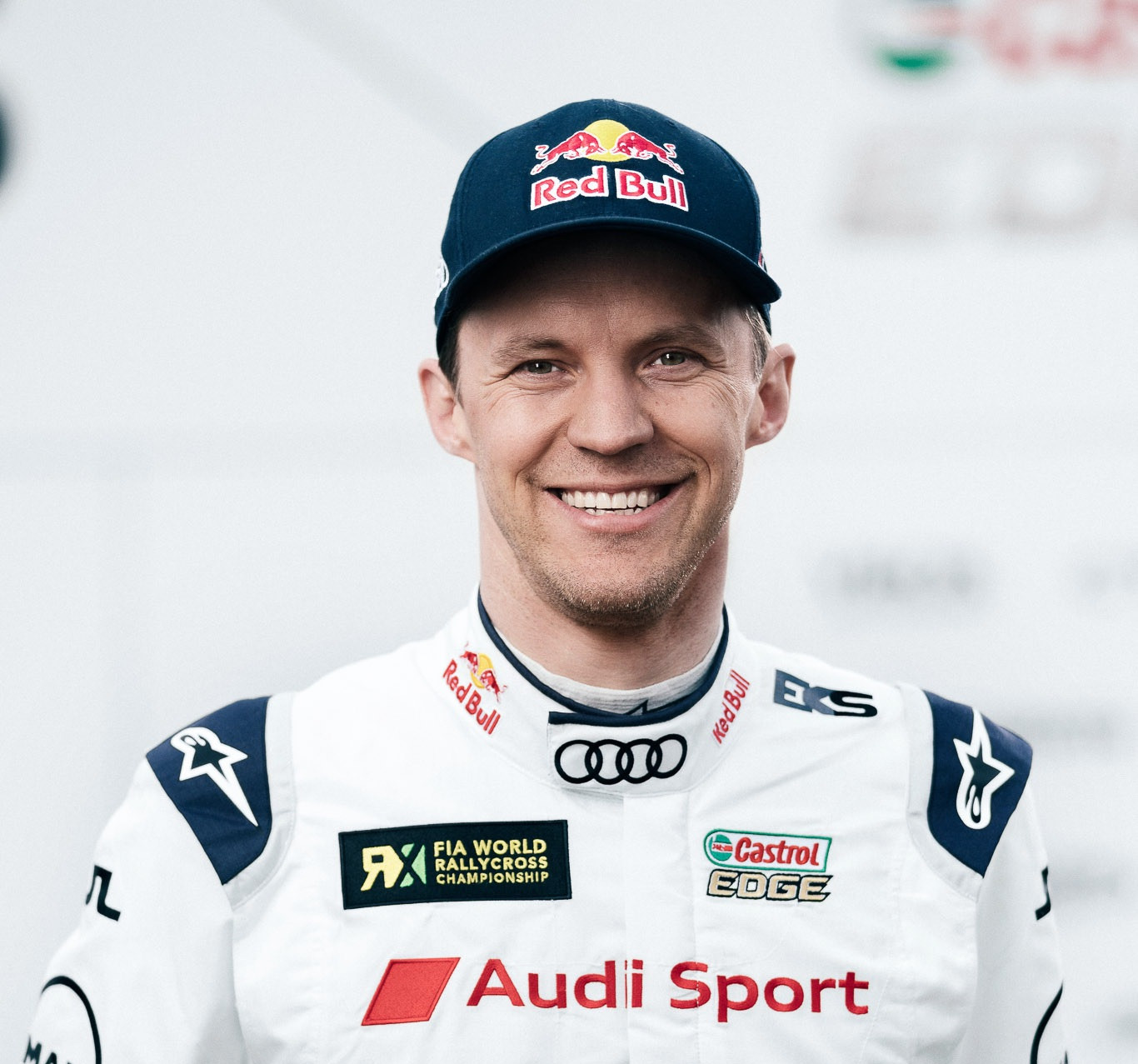
René Rast (left) won his first Drivers' Championship while Mattias Ekström (right) finished second in the championship.

The 2017 Deutsche Tourenwagen Masters was the thirty-first season of premier German touring car championship and also eighteenth season under the moniker of Deutsche Tourenwagen Masters since the series' resumption in 2000. The season is scheduled to run from 6 May until 15 October over 18 races. René Rast won his first DTM championship after a total of nine events.

== Supplier changes ==
- German wheel rim company ATS became official standard control wheel rim supplier from 2017 season onwards as it was announced on 15 March 2016.
- Hankook extend its DTM tyre supplier role until 2019 as the South Korean tyre company announced on 6 May 2016.

== Rule changes ==
=== Sporting rules ===
- On 17 September 2016, DTM announced that the field may be reduced from 24 to 18 competitors.
- The DTM race formats will be changed to 55 minutes respectively for race 1 and race 2 as it was announced on 30 March 2017.
- The team-to-driver radio has been banned for 2017 season onwards as it was announced on 1 May 2017.
- The simultaneously 4 tyre change in the pit stop has been replaced by the separated 4 tyre change in the pit stop to make longer pit duration up to 10 seconds (similar to 24 Hours of Le Mans).
- Points will be awarded for qualification positions with the top three earning points.

=== Technical rules ===
- After using single-element rear wings for five seasons, the rear wing of all DTM cars has been changed back from a single-element plane wing to a dual-element plane wing. The double-element rear wing was last featured in the DTM in the 2011 season.
- All DTM engines from 2017 season will be increased from 460 to 500 hp (343 to 373 kW) as well as the increase of intake air restrictors diameter to 29 mm.
- All DTM entrants to utilize all-new Hankook tyre compounds from 2017 season to produce aggressive grip.

== Mid-season changes ==
- The allocation of Balance of Performance DTM car weights were revised again for fine tuning.
- After several criticisms and protests from DTM teams, the Balance of Performance DTM car weights were officially abolished just before Austrian race.

== Teams and drivers ==
The following manufacturers, teams and drivers competed in the 2017 Deutsche Tourenwagen Masters. All teams competed with tyres supplied by Hankook.

Manufacturer	Car	Team	No.	Drivers	Rounds
Mercedes-Benz	Mercedes-AMG C63 DTM	(Germany) Mercedes-AMG Motorsport Mercedes Me	2	(United Kingdom) Gary Paffett	All
Mercedes-Benz	Mercedes-AMG C63 DTM	(Germany) Mercedes-AMG Motorsport Mercedes Me	6	(Canada) Robert Wickens	All
Mercedes-Benz	Mercedes-AMG C63 DTM	(Germany) Mercedes-AMG Motorsport SILBERPFEIL Energy	3	(United Kingdom) Paul di Resta	All
Mercedes-Benz	Mercedes-AMG C63 DTM	(Germany) Mercedes-AMG Motorsport SILBERPFEIL Energy	63	(Germany) Maro Engel	All
Mercedes-Benz	Mercedes-AMG C63 DTM	(Germany) Mercedes-AMG Motorsport BWT	22	(Austria) Lucas Auer	All
Mercedes-Benz	Mercedes-AMG C63 DTM	(Germany) Mercedes-AMG Motorsport BWT	48	(Italy) Edoardo Mortara	All
Audi	Audi RS5 DTM	(Germany) Audi Sport Team Abt Sportsline	5	(Sweden) Mattias Ekström	All
Audi	Audi RS5 DTM	(Germany) Audi Sport Team Abt Sportsline	51	(Switzerland) Nico Müller	All
Audi	Audi RS5 DTM	(Germany) Team Rosberg	33	(Germany) René Rast	All
Audi	Audi RS5 DTM	(Germany) Team Rosberg	53	(United Kingdom) Jamie Green	All
Audi	Audi RS5 DTM	(Germany) Team Phoenix	77	(France) Loïc Duval	All
Audi	Audi RS5 DTM	(Germany) Team Phoenix	99	(Germany) Mike Rockenfeller	All
BMW	BMW M4 DTM	(Belgium) BMW Team RBM	7	(Canada) Bruno Spengler	All
BMW	BMW M4 DTM	(Belgium) BMW Team RBM	31	(United Kingdom) Tom Blomqvist	All
BMW	BMW M4 DTM	(Belgium) BMW Team RBM	36	(Belgium) Maxime Martin	All
BMW	BMW M4 DTM	(Germany) BMW Team RMG	11	(Germany) Marco Wittmann	All
BMW	BMW M4 DTM	(Germany) BMW Team RMG	15	(Brazil) Augusto Farfus	All
BMW	BMW M4 DTM	(Germany) BMW Team RMG	16	(Germany) Timo Glock	All

=== Team changes ===
- Audi Sport Team Abt Sportsline announced that they were scaling down from four cars to a two-car team, moving in line with Audi Sport Team Phoenix and Audi Sport Team Rosberg.
- BMW Team RBM and BMW Team RMG respectively increased their number of entries from two to three cars each to fill up the two empty spots left by Team Schnitzer and Team MTEK.

Leaving DTM

- Both Mercedes-Benz DTM teams ART Grand Prix and Mücke Motorsport ceased their DTM involvement due to the reduction in the DTM field to 18 cars (6 per manufacturer) as well as ART Grand Prix focusing on junior single-seater formulas.
- Both BMW DTM teams Team Schnitzer and Team MTEK also ceased their DTM involvement for similar reasons.

=== Driver changes ===
Entering DTM

- René Rast, who replaced Mattias Ekström in the final round of DTM 2016, got his full seat with Audi.
- 2013 24 Hours of Le Mans winner and WEC champion driver Loïc Duval made his DTM debut with Audi.
- 2015 FIA GT World Cup winner and Venturi Formula E driver Maro Engel returned to DTM with Mercedes after leaving the series in 2011.

Changing teams

- The 2016 DTM championship runner-up Edoardo Mortara left Audi to join Mercedes.

Leaving DTM

- Former champions Martin Tomczyk and Timo Scheider announced that they would both retire from DTM championship after 16 years.
- BMW driver António Félix da Costa announced that he would leave DTM at the end of the 2016 season to focus on Formula E.
- Audi drivers Miguel Molina (between 2010 and 2016) and Adrien Tambay (between 2012 and 2016), both left the series.
- Daniel Juncadella, Christian Vietoris and Maximilian Götz who all drove full-time in 2016, and Felix Rosenqvist, who was a midseason replacement, were all left off the Mercedes squad in 2017.

== Calendar ==
The nine event calendar was announced on 16 December 2016. All races from 2016 will return in 2017.

Round		Circuit	Date	Pole position	Fastest lap	Winning driver	Winning team	Winning manufacturer
1	R1	(Germany) Hockenheimring, Baden-Württemberg	6 May	(Austria) Lucas Auer	(Sweden) Mattias Ekström	(Austria) Lucas Auer	Mercedes-AMG Motorsport BWT	Mercedes-Benz
1	R2	(Germany) Hockenheimring, Baden-Württemberg	7 May	(Germany) Timo Glock	(United Kingdom) Jamie Green	(United Kingdom) Jamie Green	Team Rosberg	Audi
2	R1	(Germany) Lausitzring, Brandenburg	20 May	(Austria) Lucas Auer	(Germany) René Rast	(Austria) Lucas Auer	Mercedes-AMG Motorsport BWT	Mercedes-Benz
2	R2	(Germany) Lausitzring, Brandenburg	21 May	(Canada) Robert Wickens	(Germany) René Rast	(United Kingdom) Jamie Green	Team Rosberg	Audi
3	R1	(Hungary) Hungaroring, Mogyoród	17 June	(Germany) René Rast	(Germany) Mike Rockenfeller	(United Kingdom) Paul di Resta	Mercedes-AMG Motorsport SILBERPFEIL Energy	Mercedes-Benz
3	R2	(Hungary) Hungaroring, Mogyoród	18 June	(Germany) René Rast	(Sweden) Mattias Ekström	(Germany) René Rast	Team Rosberg	Audi
4	R1	(Germany) Norisring, Nuremberg	1 July	(Belgium) Maxime Martin	(United Kingdom) Tom Blomqvist	(Canada) Bruno Spengler	BMW Team RBM	BMW
4	R2	(Germany) Norisring, Nuremberg	2 July	(United Kingdom) Tom Blomqvist	(Canada) Bruno Spengler	(Belgium) Maxime Martin	BMW Team RBM	BMW
5	R1	(Russia) Moscow Raceway, Volokolamsk	22 July	(Germany) René Rast (Note: Originally scored by Marco Wittmann, the German had to serve a five-place grid penalty after receiving his third warning of the season in the previous round.)	(Canada) Robert Wickens	(Germany) René Rast	Team Rosberg	Audi
5	R2	(Russia) Moscow Raceway, Volokolamsk	23 July	(Canada) Bruno Spengler	(United Kingdom) Jamie Green	(Germany) Maro Engel	Mercedes-AMG Motorsport SILBERPFEIL Energy	Mercedes-Benz
6	R1	(Netherlands) Circuit Park Zandvoort, North Holland	19 August	(Germany) Timo Glock	(Germany) René Rast	(Germany) Timo Glock	BMW Team RMG	BMW
6	R2	(Netherlands) Circuit Park Zandvoort, North Holland	20 August	(Brazil) Augusto Farfus	(France) Loïc Duval	(Germany) Mike Rockenfeller (Note: Originally won by Marco Wittmann, he was disqualified for not having enough fuel at the end of the race.)	Team Phoenix	Audi
7	R1	(Germany) Nürburgring, Rhineland-Palatinate	9 September	(Austria) Lucas Auer	(Switzerland) Nico Müller	(Austria) Lucas Auer	Mercedes-AMG Motorsport BWT	Mercedes-Benz
7	R2	(Germany) Nürburgring, Rhineland-Palatinate	10 September	(Germany) Marco Wittmann	(Germany) René Rast	(Canada) Robert Wickens	Mercedes-AMG Motorsport Mercedes Me	Mercedes-Benz
8	R1	(Austria) Red Bull Ring, Spielberg	23 September	(United Kingdom) Jamie Green	(United Kingdom) Jamie Green	(Sweden) Mattias Ekström	Audi Sport Team Abt Sportsline	Audi
8	R2	(Austria) Red Bull Ring, Spielberg	24 September	(United Kingdom) Jamie Green	(United Kingdom) Jamie Green	(Germany) René Rast	Team Rosberg	Audi
9	R1	(Germany) Hockenheimring, Baden-Württemberg	14 October	(Germany) Timo Glock	(Germany) Mike Rockenfeller	(United Kingdom) Jamie Green	Team Rosberg	Audi
9	R2	(Germany) Hockenheimring, Baden-Württemberg	15 October	(United Kingdom) Tom Blomqvist	(United Kingdom) Jamie Green	(Germany) Marco Wittmann	BMW Team RMG	BMW

== Championship standings ==
Scoring system

Points were awarded to the top ten classified finishers as follows:

Race Position	**1st**	**2nd**	**3rd**	**4th**	**5th**	**6th**	**7th**	**8th**	**9th**	**10th**
Points	25	18	15	12	10	8	6	4	2	1

Additionally, starting 2017, the top three placed drivers in qualifying will also receive points.

Qualifying Position	**1st**	**2nd**	**3rd**
Points	3	2	1

=== Drivers' championship ===
Pos.	Driver	HOC (Germany)		LAU (Germany)		HUN (Hungary)		NOR (Germany)		MSC (Russia)		ZAN (Netherlands)		NÜR (Germany)		RBR (Austria)		HOC (Germany)		Points
1	(Germany) René Rast	6	Ret^{2}	3	7	**6**^{1}	**1**^{1}	12^{2}	Ret	**1**^{2}	4^{3}	9	Ret	5	12	13	1^{2}	6	2^{2}	179
2	(Sweden) Mattias Ekström	5	11	8	2	5^{3}	2^{3}	3	4	8	2^{2}	17†	3	15	6	1^{3}	5	11	8	176
3	(United Kingdom) Jamie Green	18	1^{3}	10	1^{3}	DSQ^{2}	5	7	8	9	5	5	9	6	7	**2**^{1}	**14**^{1}	1^{3}	5	173
4	(Germany) Mike Rockenfeller	3	7	5	5	4	10	13	Ret	2^{3}	12	4	1	14	17	7	2	2	3	167
5	(Germany) Marco Wittmann	10	3	13	9	8	Ret^{2}	4	5	3^{1}	6	2^{3}	DSQ^{2}	9^{2}	**3**^{1}	5	6^{3}	13	1^{3}	160
6	(Austria) Lucas Auer	**1**^{1}	4	**1**^{1}	10	12	Ret	Ret	2	6	8	15	14	**1**^{1}	13	8	Ret	8	10	136
7	(Germany) Timo Glock	2	**8**^{1}	11	15	2	7	5	10	5	13	**1**^{1}	7	12	8	10	7	**3**^{1}	12	133
8	(Belgium) Maxime Martin	11	Ret	4^{3}	8	Ret	3	**2**^{1}	1	16	Ret	3	6^{3}	17	11	6	11	4^{2}	6	132
9	(Canada) Robert Wickens	15	Ret	2^{2}	**3**^{1}	Ret	8	Ret	11^{2}	4	9	11	15†	3^{3}	1^{3}	4	10	7	17†	119
10	(United Kingdom) Gary Paffett	7^{2}	2	6	4	7	9	10	Ret	7	16	8	5	10	14	17	4	9	4	102
11	(United Kingdom) Paul di Resta	8	6	16	13	1	6	11	6	14	DSQ	7	Ret	2	2^{2}	11	9	14	16	99
12	(Switzerland) Nico Müller	9	5	18	6	10	4	9	13^{3}	15	15	10	4	11	Ret	3^{2}	3	12	11	81
13	(Canada) Bruno Spengler	12	9	14	16	3	14	1^{3}	12	12	**3**^{1}	14	10	13	4	12	16	10	14	75
14	(Italy) Edoardo Mortara	4^{3}	13	7	11	9	11	8	3	13	10	12	12	7	16	9	17†	5	9	61
15	(Germany) Maro Engel	17	10	9	12	13	15	14	14	10	1	16	11	4	5	15	15	16	13	51
16	(Brazil) Augusto Farfus	13	Ret	12	14	11	12	Ret	7	17	11	6^{2}	**8**^{1}	8	9	Ret	12	17	7	35
17	(United Kingdom) Tom Blomqvist	16	12	17	17^{2}	15†	13	6	**9**^{1}	Ret	7	Ret	13	16	10	16	13	15	**Ret**^{1}	25
18	(France) Loïc Duval	14	Ret	15	18	14	16	15	15	11	14	13	2	18	15	14	8	18	15	22
Pos.	Driver	HOC (Germany)		LAU (Germany)		HUN (Hungary)		NOR (Germany)		MSC (Russia)		ZAN (Netherlands)		NÜR (Germany)		RBR (Austria)		HOC (Germany)		Points

Colour	Result
Gold	Winner
Silver	Second place
Bronze	Third place
Green	Points classification
Blue	Non-points classification
Blue	Non-classified finish (NC)
Purple	Retired, not classified (Ret)
Red	Did not qualify (DNQ)
Red	Did not pre-qualify (DNPQ)
Black	Disqualified (DSQ)
White	Did not start (DNS)
White	Withdrew (WD)
White	Race cancelled (C)
Blank	Did not practice (DNP)
Blank	Did not arrive (DNA)
Blank	Excluded (EX)

**Bold** – Pole
Italics – Fastest Lap
1 – 3 Points for Pole
2 – 2 Points for P2
3 – 1 Point for P3

- † — Driver retired, but was classified as they completed 75% of the winner's race distance.

=== Manufacturers' championship ===
Pos.	Driver	HOC (Germany)		LAU (Germany)		HUN (Hungary)		NOR (Germany)		MSC (Russia)		ZAN (Netherlands)		NÜR (Germany)		RBR (Austria)		HOC (Germany)		Points
1	Audi	35	**44**	30	**68**	**37**	**70**	25	17	**52**	**43**	25	**72**	18	14	**70**	**77**	**52**	**49**	798
2	Mercedes-Benz	**53**	39	**64**	31	33	14	5	43	27	32	10	10	**81**	**56**	18	15	22	15	568
3	BMW	19	24	13	8	37	23	**77**	**47**	28	32	**72**	25	8	37	19	14	33	43	560
Pos.	Driver	HOC (Germany)		LAU (Germany)		HUN (Hungary)		NOR (Germany)		MSC (Russia)		ZAN (Netherlands)		NÜR (Germany)		RBR (Austria)		HOC (Germany)		Points

=== Teams' championship ===
Pos.	Team	Points
1	Audi Sport Team Rosberg	352
2	Audi Sport Team Abt Sportsline	257
3	Mercedes-AMG Motorsport Mercedes me	221
4	BMW Team RBM (#7, #36)	207
5	BWT Mercedes-AMG Motorsport	197
6	BMW Team RMG (#11, #15)	195
7	Audi Sport Team Phoenix	189
8	BMW Team RMR (#16, #31)	158
9	SILBERPFEIL Energy Mercedes-AMG Motorsport	150

== Bibliography ==
- Upietz, Tim (15 December 2017). DTM 2017: Das offizielle Jahrbuch. Duisburg: Gruppe C Motorsport Verlag. ISBN 978-3-928540-94-0.
