= W. B. Stonebridge =

British architect (1879–1962)

Walter Butler Stonebridge FRIBA
- Born: 8 September 1879; Oakley, Bedfordshire, England
- Died: 1 November 1962 (aged 83); Barton on Sea, Hampshire, England
- Education: Bedford Modern School

Walter Butler Stonebridge FRIBA (8 September 1879 – 1 November 1962) was an architect, Diocesan Surveyor for Ely and St Albans and afterwards Surveyor for the Archdeaconry of Bedford. He was president of the Northamptonshire, Bedfordshire and Huntingdonshire Society of Architects in 1932.

== Early life ==
Stonebridge was born on 8 September 1879 at Oakley, Bedfordshire, and christened Walter Charles Butler Stonebridge. He was the son of Charles Stonebridge, a Carpenter and Surveyor of Works, and his wife Emily. Stonebridge was educated at Bedford Modern School and then articled to the architectural practice of Messrs Highton and Ardron of Bedford and Westminster between 1895 and 1899.

== Career ==
After Highton and Ardron, Stonebridge was an Assistant in the Duke of Bedford's Estate Office, to H. Ban of Maidstone and to John E. Kingham of Aldershot. He commenced independent practice in 1903 in Woburn Sands and Bedford. Following the outbreak of World War I, Stonebridge served with the 1/7 West Yorkshire Regiment leaving at the end of the war as a Lance-Corporal.

After the war, Stonebridge became Ecclesiastical Surveyor for the Dioceses of Ely and St Albans and was thereafter Diocesan Surveyor for Bedford. In the latter years of his career in private practice, he worked in partnership with H.A. Harris.

Stonebridge was elected LRIBA on 9 January 1911, and FRIBA in 1925. He was president of the Northamptonshire, Bedfordshire and Huntingdonshire Society of Architects in 1932.

== Family life ==
Stonebridge married Jane Winslade on 11 January 1905 at the Church of St John the Evangelist in Hale, Surrey. They had a son, Bernard Butler Stonebridge, and a daughter, Mary Julia Stonebridge. His wife predeceased him on 24 December 1961 and Stonebridge died on 1 November 1962 at Barton on Sea in Hampshire.

== Selected works ==
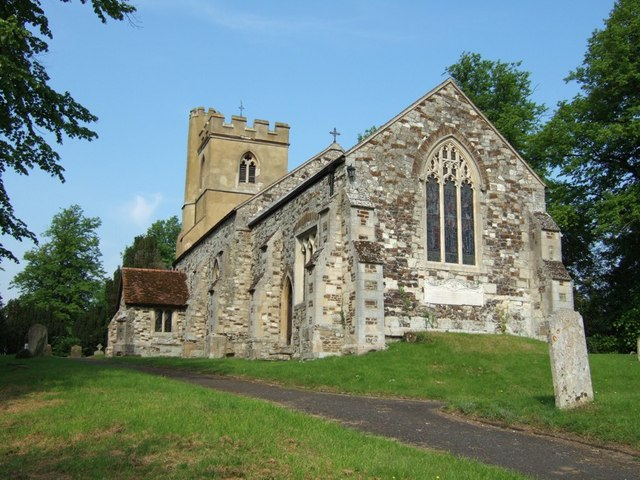
The Church of St Nicholas, Hockliffe

- Restoration of the Tower of Hockliffe Church, Bedfordshire, 1910
- Replacement of the Powage Press after fire, Aspley Guise, 1912
- Woburn Sands War Memorial, Bedfordshire, 1919
- Elstow Lodge, Bedfordshire, 1926
- Alterations to Campton Manor, Bedfordshire, 1927–28
- Alterations to the Vicarage, Harrold, Bedfordshire, 1928
- Extension to Gastlings House, Bedfordshire, 1929
- Rectory, Pertenhall, Bedfordshire, 1937. With H.A. Harris
