= Nick Tandy =

British racing driver (born 1984)

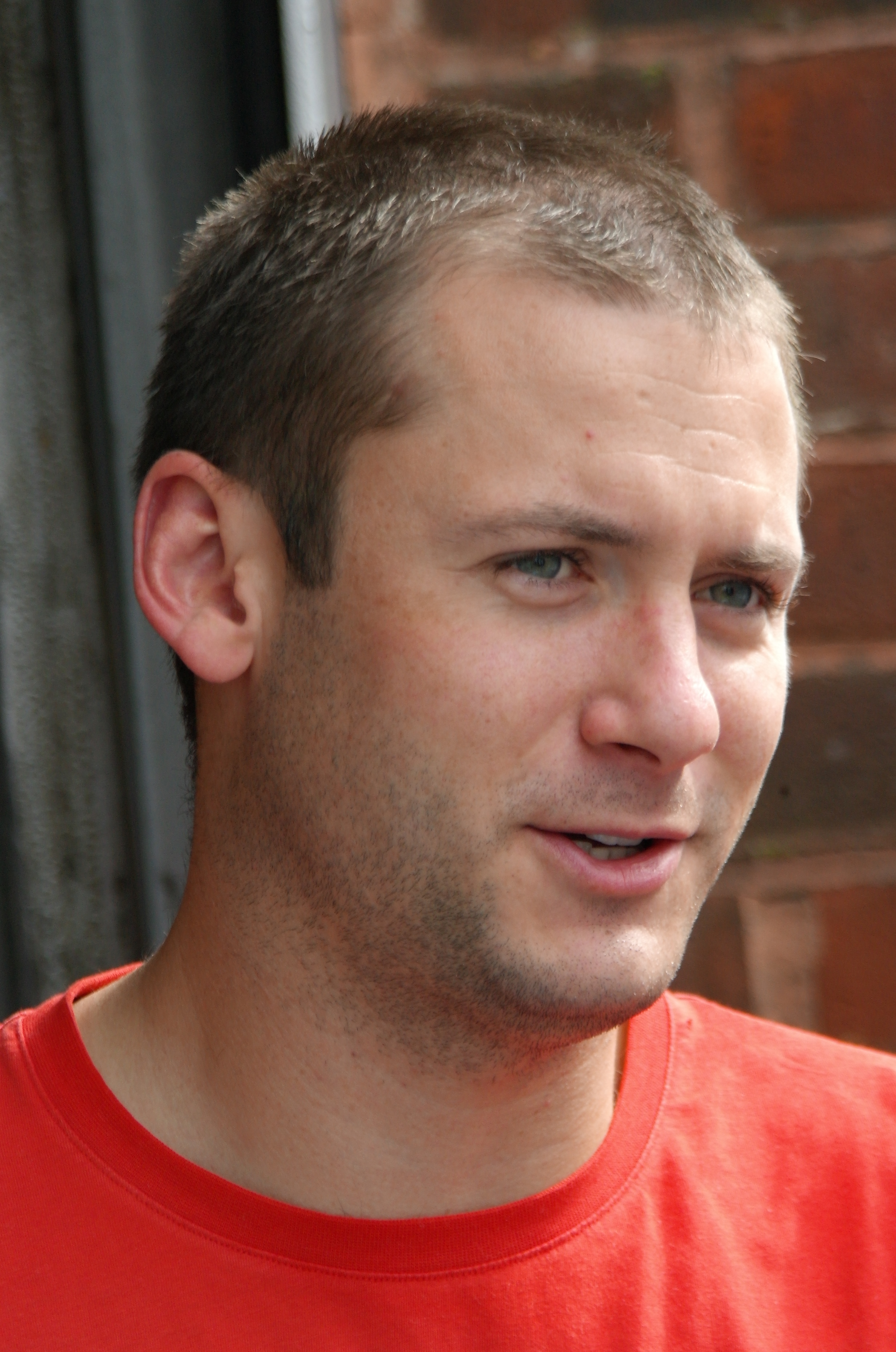
- Tandy in 2014
- Nationality: (United Kingdom) British
- Born: Nicholas Tandy; 5 November 1984 (age 42) Bedford, Bedfordshire, England
- Relatives: Joe Tandy (brother)

IMSA SportsCar Championship career
- Debut season: 2014
- Current team: AO Racing
- Categorisation: FIA Gold (until 2014); FIA Platinum (2015–)
- Car number: 7
- Former teams: Porsche Penske Motorsport, Porsche NA, Porsche GT, Corvette
- Starts: 112
- Championships: 0
- Wins: 24
- Podiums: 47
- Poles: 16
- Fastest laps: 17
- Best finish: 2nd in 2019, 2021 (GTLM), 2024 (GTP)

FIA World Endurance Championship career
- Years active: 2014–2015, 2017, 2022
- Teams: Manthey, KCMG, Porsche, Corvette
- Starts: 25
- Championships: 0
- Wins: 3
- Podiums: 15
- Poles: 5
- Fastest laps: 4
- Best finish: 4th in 2017 (LMP1)

24 Hours of Le Mans career
- Years: 2011, 2014–2025
- Teams: Felbermayr-Proton, Manthey, Porsche, Porsche GT, G-Drive, Corvette
- Best finish: 1st (2015)
- Class wins: 1 (2015)

Previous series
- 2025; 2012–2014; 2013; 2012–2013; 2008–2011; 2009; 2008–2009; 2007; 2006–2008; 2005; 2001–2004; 1996–2000: Mini Challenge UK; British GT; ELMS; ALMS; Porsche Carrera Cup; Formula 3 Euro Series; British F3; Formula Palmer Audi; British FFord; BRDC Single Seater; Mini Se7en; Short Oval Ministox

Championship titles
- 2025; 2025; 2007; 2005: 12 Hours of Sebring; 24 Hours of Daytona; Formula Ford Festival; BRDC Single Seater
- Statistics up to date as of 6 May 2026.

Nicholas Tandy (born 5 November 1984) is a British racing driver who competes in the IMSA SportsCar Championship as a factory driver for Porsche. Tandy is the only person to have completed the Grand Slam of overall victories in major 24-hour races: winning the 24 Hours of Le Mans in 2015; the Nürburgring 24 Hours in 2018; the Spa 24 Hours in 2020; and the 24 Hours of Daytona in 2025.

Other major career milestones for Tandy include overall victory at the 2015 Petit Le Mans and the 2025 12 Hours of Sebring, which made him the first driver in history to win the "Big Six" endurance races. He also has class victories at the 2013, 2018 and 2020 Petit Le Mans; the 2014 24 Hours of Daytona; and the 2018, 2019 and 2020 12 Hours of Sebring.

== Career ==
=== Ministox ===
Born in Bedford, Tandy followed brother Joe's route on the motor racing ladder, by starting out as an eleven-year-old in short oval Ministox machinery, in 1996. Immediate success came to him, as he won the Midland region of Ministox. 1997 saw a shift to the East Anglian Ministox region, where Tandy ended as runner-up. 1998 saw Tandy finish as runner-up in the world championship, behind brother Joe and also finished third in the national championship. He would go two places better in 1999, as he claimed the Spedeworth points title. Tandy won four different championships in 2000. Winning the ORC Championship at RAF Bovingdon, he continued the success at Arlington, Eastbourne (Southern), and at Wimbledon Stadium (London), before retaining the Spedeworth points title.

=== Mini Se7ens ===
Continuing the Mini theme, Tandy moved into Mini Se7ens in time for the 2001 Winter Series. He ended up third in the championship, won eventually by Kelly Rogers. Tandy moved into the main series for 2002, but struggled to find form and eventually languished down in tenth in the overall championship standings. A second Winter Series campaign followed, and improved his 2001 position by one by finishing runner-up. He competed in two more seasons in the main championship, amassing four wins in 2003.

=== Formula Ford ===
After a year in the BRDC Single Seater Championship, which he dominated in 2005 (11 wins from 14 races) and earning a Scholarship from Silverstone, Tandy moved into the British Formula Ford Championship in 2006. Tandy had an impressive first season in the championship, finishing as runner-up in the standings, with 365 points. Although, he was over 150 points behind dominating champion Nathan Freke. Tandy had started out at the Raysport team but with his car lacking upgrades, decided to jump ship with four races to go and become the first driver for his brother's newly setup team. A win and a second place at both Thruxton and Castle Combe allowed Tandy to overhaul Peter Dempsey, Christian Ebbesvik and James Nash to achieve that runner-up position behind Freke. He then proceeded to win the 2006 Formula Ford Festival on the road, before a ten-second penalty was added post-race for a safety car misdemeanour, dropping him to fifth. He continued in the championship in 2007, but finished one place lower in the standings, finishing third overall. Tandy and Nash were involved in a titanic battle for the runner-up spot (as Callum MacLeod finishing some 130 points clear of the pair), which was eventually settled by just twelve points. Tandy won six races throughout the season, and finished on the podium on ten other occasions. After his close call the previous year, Tandy won the Formula Ford Festival at the end of the season, but only after MacLeod was given a two-second penalty post-race.

=== Formula Palmer Audi ===
After his Formula Ford Festival win, Tandy signed a very late deal to compete in the Formula Palmer Audi Autumn Trophy, and in particular the Formula Palmer Audi Shootout. The Shootout guarantees a place on the shortlist for the McLaren Autosport BRDC Award for the driver who scores the most points over the course of the three-race weekend at Snetterton. Thanks to two wins, and a fourth (although the fourth was irrelevant due to best two scores), Tandy won the Shootout and was part of the shortlist. However, he would lose out to Stefan Wilson.

=== Formula Three ===
After two years in Formula Ford, Tandy moved into the highly competitive British Formula 3 Championship for the 2008 season. Driving for his brother's team and piloting the unfavourable Mygale chassis, Tandy started with three retirements. He steadily improved throughout the season, and recorded his first podium during the overseas round at Spa-Francorchamps, in support of the Spa 24 Hours. Two more podiums came towards the end of the season at Silverstone and Donington Park, as he ended up ninth overall, overtaking Max Chilton at the Donington finale. He also competed in the guest car in the Porsche Carrera Cup at Silverstone, winning the first race.

Tandy continued in the series in 2009, and also continued to use the Mygale chassis and Mercedes engines. With Ultimate Motorsport pulling out of the series, JTR became the de facto lead team for Mygale, with Tandy being touted as a championship contender. After a double podium at the Oulton Park opener, Tandy suffered a somewhat disappointing weekend at Silverstone with low points finishes. After his brother's death, the team vowed to carry on in both Formula Three and in Formula Ford. Eighteen days after his brother's death, Tandy scored his and the team's first win with a dominating performance at Rockingham. Having negotiated the first lap incident which took out rivals Daniel Ricciardo and Renger van der Zande, Tandy drove away from the field to win by 8.608 seconds from Henry Arundel and Adriano Buzaid. Tandy is also noted for his pace over a single lap, having recorded four fastest laps from the first eight races of the championship, and at one point, lay third in the standings.

After Carlo van Dam left Kolles & Heinz Union, Tandy was signed up to drive at the Norisring in the Formula Three Euroseries. The following weekend, Tandy signed a deal to compete in the rest of the Euroseries campaign, but a clause in the contract meant that he did not compete again in the rest of the British championship. Tandy left the team before the Dijon-Prenois rounds.

=== Porsche Carrera Cup Germany and Porsche Supercup ===
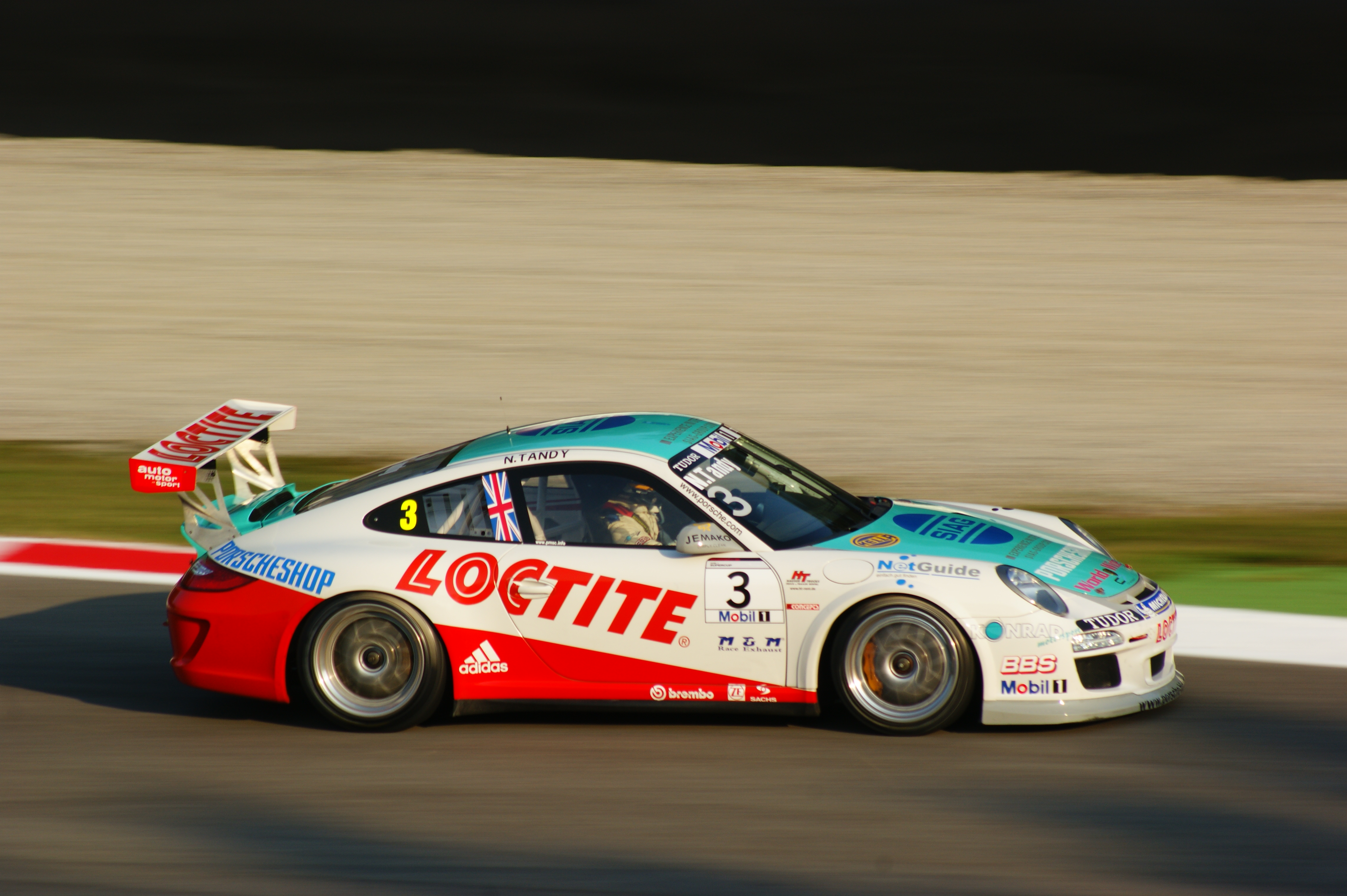
Tandy driving at Monza during the 2011 Porsche Supercup.

Tandy was then offered the opportunity to compete in the Porsche Carrera Cup Germany at the Dijon-Prenois rounds with Konrad Motorsport where on his debut with no testing, he finished second. Following this performance, Tandy was given a drive with Konrad in Porsche Supercup at the Abu Dhabi round supporting Formula 1. He was again on the podium with a second place. Having impressed in the 2009 season finale, Tandy drove on a permanent basis for the German-based team in the Porsche Mobil 1 Supercup; he started the 2010 Porsche Supercup season with an excellent qualifying performance and was rewarded with a podium in the opening rounds, and Tandy swiftly went on to take his first Porsche Supercup win on 11 July 2010 at the British circuit, Silverstone GP, in superb fashion with a classic lights to flag victory. Tandy's full debut season ended with him putting in a strong challenge for the title, taking the fight with eventual winner René Rast, to the final race at the famous Autodromo Nazionale Monza. Tandy returned for a second season in 2011 but he failed to achieve his ambition of winning the title after only winning one race at Abu Dhabi and finishing fifth in the championship. In the German Cup, he came close to winning the championship in 2010 after winning five races but also finished two races outside the top fifteen and retired at the final round. He won the 2011 championship winning three races and finishing on the podium seven times.

=== International sports car racing ===
In 2012, Tandy started in various sports car racing series such as the American Le Mans Series, the ADAC GT Masters and the International GT Open. Together with Marco Holzer, his teammate at Manthey Racing, he became runner-up of the 2012 International GT Open season. Tandy won the Porsche Cup, an annual award presented by Porsche AG to recognize the world's most successful privateer racing driver competing with Porsche machinery in a customer racing team, in 2012.

Shortly after that, Tandy has been signed as the tenth Porsche works driver. His first official race was the 2013 24 Hours of Daytona Tandy won the GT class of the 2013 Petit Le Mans and resulted third at the 12 Hours of Sebring, driving for Team Falken Tire alongside Wolf Henzler and Bryan Sellers. He also won the GTC class at American Le Mans Series race at Laguna Seca with NGT Motorsport. Also, he won two races at the European Le Mans Series in the GTE class, ending third in the standings.

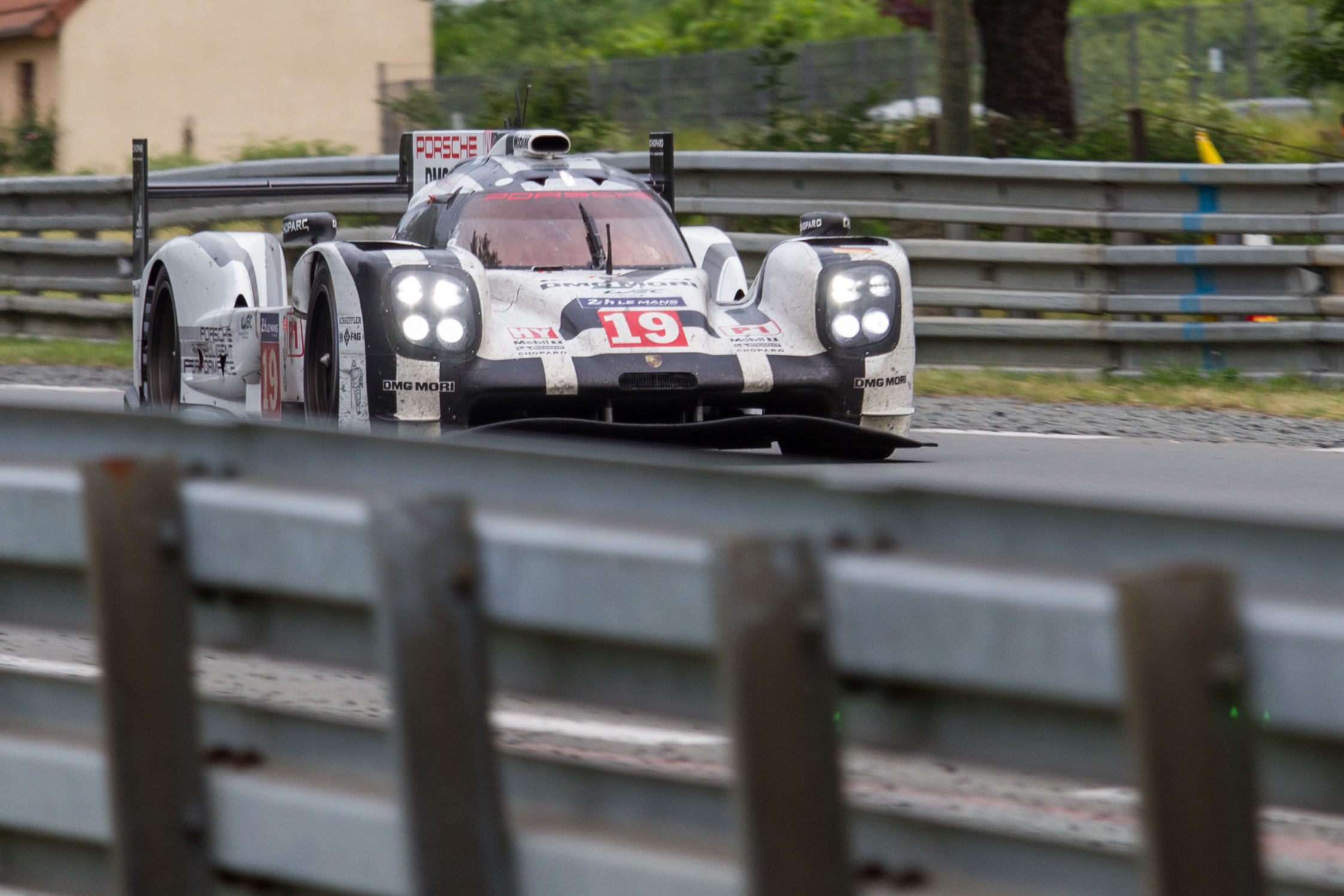
Tandy, winner of the 2015 24 Hours of Le Mans, car Porsche 919 Hybrid #19

Tandy joined the Porsche factory team at the United SportsCar Championship for the 2014 season. He shared a Core Porsche 911 RSR in the GTLM class with Richard Lietz. He won the season-opening Rolex 24 at Daytona with Lietz and Patrick Pilet.

In 2015, Tandy partnered Patrick Pilet in the United SportsCar Championship. He claimed four wins and a third-place finish, helping his teammate to win the drivers championship, as well as the teams championship and also overall win in 2015 Petit Le Mans with a Porsche 911 RSR of GTLM class.

Also in 2015, Tandy joined the Porsche LMP1 factory team at the 6 Hours of Spa-Francorchamps and 24 Hours of Le Mans, winning the French classic. He also drove a KCMG Oreca Nissan at five rounds of the World Endurance Championship, helping the team to finish runner-up in the LMP2 standings.

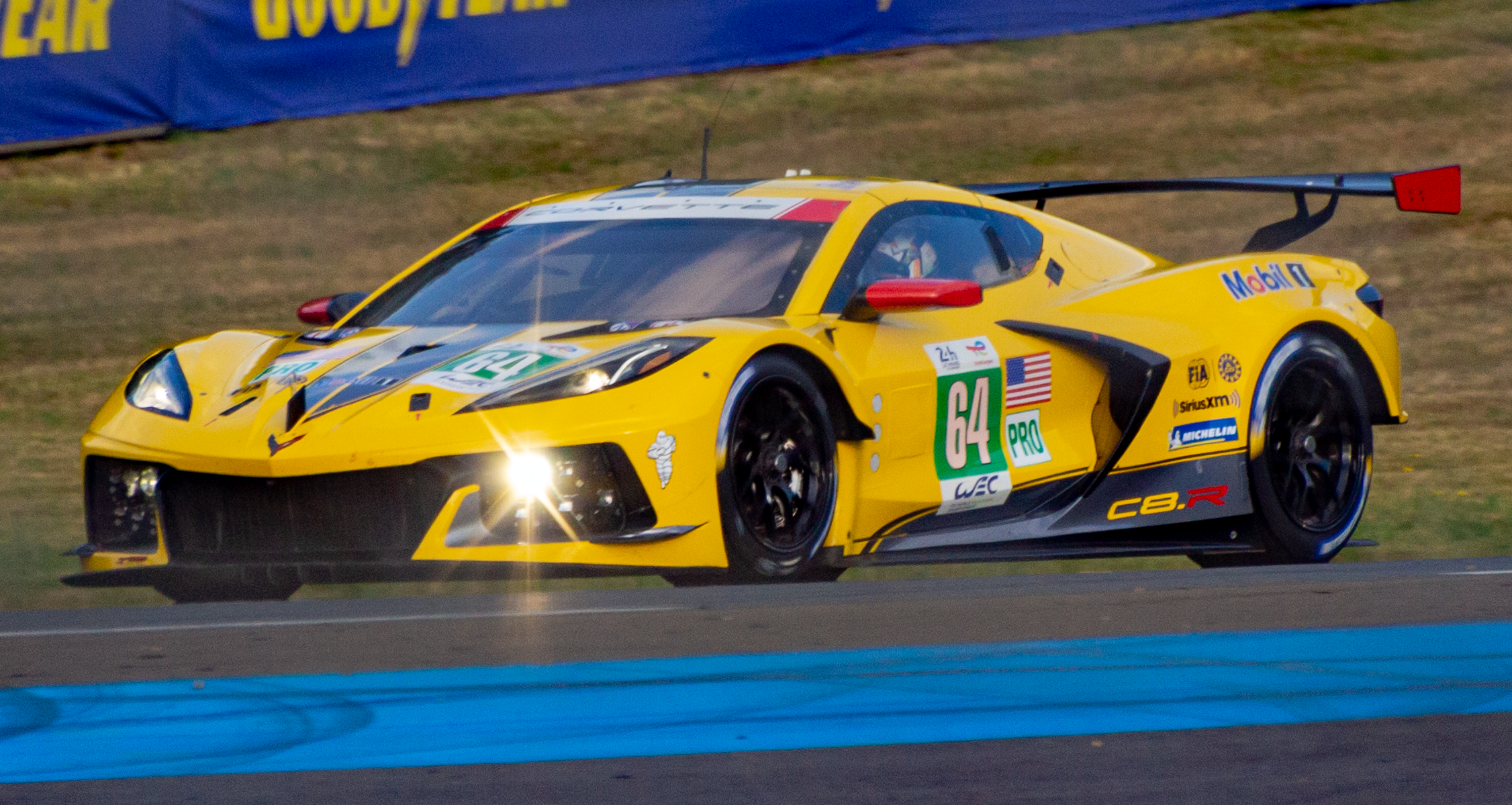
Tandy driving at the 2022 24 Hours of Le Mans.

In 2016, Tandy continued sharing a factory Porsche 911 with Pilet at the GT Le Mans class of the IMSA SportsCar Championship, scoring a class win at Long Beach and a second place at Austin.

Tandy returned to Porsche's LMP1 factory team for the 2017 FIA World Endurance Championship, where he scored multiple podiums but no wins.

As Porsche left sports prototype racing for 2018, Tandy returned to the IMSA SportsCar Championship, sharing the No. 911 car with Pilet. He earned two wins and ranked seventh in the GTLM class standings. In 2019, he was runner-up with three wins. Also in 2019, he finished third at the 24 Hours of Le Mans, with Earl Bamber as third driver.

Tandy continued the No. 911 GTLM car at the 2020 IMSA SportsCar Championship, now partnering with Frédéric Makowiecki. The duo got two wins and finished fifth in points. He also scored a DNF at the 24 Hours of Le Mans with an Aurus LMP2.

Corvette Racing signed Tandy for the 2021 IMSA SportsCar Championship. Driving with Tommy Milner, he claimed four wins and finished runner-up in the GTLM class, behind their teammates.

In 2022, Tandy continued sharing a factory Corvette with Milner, but in the FIA World Endurance Championship. He got a win and two runner-ups, and was sixth in the GTE drivers ranking.

Tandy returned to the Porsche for the 2023 season to drive a Porsche 963 prototype.

== Personal life ==
Tandy from Pavenham, Bedfordshire now resides in neighbouring village Felmersham with his wife and two children. He was educated at the local state schools: Pinchmill Lower School in Felmersham, Lincroft Middle School in Oakley and Sharnbrook Upper School and Community College in Sharnbrook. Nick's brother Joe died in a road traffic accident in Bromham, Bedfordshire on 13 May 2009. Nick drove for his late brother's team, Joe Tandy Racing, from 2006 until his Euroseries deal in mid-2009.

== Racing record ==
=== Racing career summary ===
Season	Series	Team	Races	Wins	Poles	F/Laps	Podiums	Points	Position
2006	British Formula Ford Championship	Ray Sport	18	3	2	3	11	365	**2nd**
2007	British Formula Ford Championship	Joe Tandy Racing	25	6	1	?	15	550	**3rd**
2008	British Formula 3 International Series	Joe Tandy Racing	20	0	0	0	3	86	9th
2008	Masters of Formula 3	Joe Tandy Racing	1	0	0	0	0	N/A	DNF
2009	British Formula 3 International Series	Joe Tandy Racing	8	1	0	4	3	68	10th
2009	Formula 3 Euro Series	Kolles & Heinz Union	11	0	0	0	0	0	28th
2009	Porsche Supercup	Konrad Motorsport	2	0	0	1	1	0	NC†
2009	Porsche Carrera Cup Germany	Konrad Motorsport	1	0	0	0	1	0	NC†
2010	Porsche Supercup	Konrad Motorsport	10	3	3	3	5	146	**2nd**
2010	Porsche Carrera Cup Germany	Konrad Motorsport	9	5	5	4	6	121	**2nd**
2011	Porsche Supercup	Konrad Motorsport	11	1	0	4	6	129	5th
2011	Porsche Carrera Cup Germany	Konrad Motorsport	9	3	2	0	7	138	**1st**
2011	Rolex Sports Car Series - GT	Brutin Racing	1	0	0	0	0	16	57th
2011	24 Hours of Le Mans - LMGTE Pro	Team Felbermayr-Proton	1	0	0	0	0	N/A	DNF
2011	24 Hours of Nürburgring - SP7	Sponsorcard: MSC Adenau e.V.	1	0	0	0	0	N/A	DNF
2012	ADAC GT Masters	Schütz Motorsport	12	4	1	0	4	117	7th
2012	American Le Mans Series - GTC	TRG	1	0	0	0	0	0	NC
2012	American Le Mans Series - GT	Flying Lizard Motorsports	1	0	0	0	0	8	26th
2012	Rolex Sports Car Series - GT	NGT Motorsport	1	0	0	0	0	16	68th
2012	British GT Championship - GT3	Motorbase Performance	4	0	1	1	0	20	21st
2012	International GT Open - Super GT	Manthey Racing	16	3	?	?	?	84	**2nd**
2012	24 Hours of Nürburgring - SP9	Manthey Racing	1	0	0	0	0	N/A	DNF
2013	ADAC GT Masters	Farnbacher Racing	2	0	0	0	0	2	38th
2013	American Le Mans Series - GTC	NGT Motorsport	1	1	0	0	1	22	15th
2013	American Le Mans Series - GT	Team Falken Tire	1	1	0	0	2	41	14th
2013	Rolex Sports Car Series - GT	Konrad Motorsport/Orbit	1	0	0	0	0	16	62nd
2013	European Le Mans Series - LMGTE	Proton Competition	4	2	1	1	3	70	**3rd**
2013	FIA GT Series	Trackspeed	2	0	0	0	0	0	NC†
2013	British GT Championship - GT3	Trackspeed	10	3	2	2	4	93	6th
2013	Blancpain Endurance Series - Pro	Prospeed Competition	1	0	0	0	0	0	NC
2013	24 Hours of Nürburgring - SP9	Manthey Racing	1	0	0	0	0	N/A	10th
2014	United SportsCar Championship - GTLM	Porsche North America	11	1	1	0	1	279	11th
2014	FIA World Endurance Championship - LMGTE Pro	Porsche Team Manthey	3	0	0	0	1	31	17th
2014	24 Hours of Le Mans - LMGTE Pro	Porsche Team Manthey	1	0	0	0	0	N/A	7th
2014	British GT Championship - GT3	Trackspeed	2	0	0	1	1	46.5	11th
2014	Blancpain Sprint Series - Pro	Farnbacher Racing	0	0	0	0	0	0	NC
2015	United SportsCar Championship - GTLM	Porsche North America	8	4	2	1	5	255	9th
2015	FIA World Endurance Championship - LMP1	Porsche Team	2	1	0	0	1	70.5	8th
2015	24 Hours of Le Mans - LMP1	Porsche Team	1	1	0	0	1	N/A	**1st**
2015	FIA World Endurance Championship - LMP2	KCMG	5	1	1	3	3	71	6th
2016	IMSA SportsCar Championship - GTLM	Porsche North America	8	1	1	0	2	285	8th
2016	24 Hours of Le Mans - LMGTE Pro	Porsche Motorsport	1	0	0	0	0	N/A	DNF
2016	24 Hours of Nürburgring - SP9	Manthey Racing	1	0	0	0	0	N/A	DNF
2017	IMSA SportsCar Championship - GTLM	Porsche GT Team	1	0	0	0	0	25	25th
2017	FIA World Endurance Championship - LMP1	Porsche LMP Team	9	0	3	0	7	129	4th
2017	24 Hours of Le Mans - LMP1	Porsche LMP Team	1	1	0	0	1	N/A	DNF
2018	IMSA SportsCar Championship - GTLM	Porsche GT Team	11	2	1	2	3	299	7th
2018	24 Hours of Le Mans - LMGTE Pro	Porsche GT Team	1	0	0	0	0	N/A	10th
2018	24 Hours of Nürburgring - SP9	Manthey Racing	1	1	0	0	1	N/A	**1st**
2019	IMSA SportsCar Championship - GTLM	Porsche GT Team	11	3	3	2	5	317	**2nd**
2019	24 Hours of Le Mans - LMGTE Pro	Porsche GT Team	1	0	0	0	1	N/A	**3rd**
2019	Blancpain GT Series Endurance Cup	Rowe Racing	1	0	0	1	1	18	14th
2019	24 Hours of Nürburgring - SP9	Manthey Racing	1	0	0	0	0	N/A	DNF
2020	IMSA SportsCar Championship - GTLM	Porsche GT Team	10	2	3	2	6	297	5th
2020	24 Hours of Le Mans - LMP2	G-Drive Racing with Algarve	1	0	0	0	0	N/A	DNF
2020	GT World Challenge Europe Endurance Cup	Rowe Racing	1	1	0	0	1	33	10th
2021	IMSA SportsCar Championship - GTLM	Corvette Racing	11	4	3	4	8	3448	**2nd**
2021	24 Hours of Le Mans - LMGTE Pro	Corvette Racing	1	0	0	0	0	N/A	6th
2021	GT World Challenge Europe Endurance Cup	KCMG	1	0	0	0	0	12	19th
2021	24 Hours of Nürburgring - SP9	Frikadelli Racing Team	1	0	0	0	0	N/A	DNF
2022	IMSA SportsCar Championship - GTD Pro	Corvette Racing	1	0	0	0	0	234	35th
2022	FIA World Endurance Championship - LMGTE Pro	Corvette Racing	6	1	1	1	3	102	6th
2022	24 Hours of Le Mans - LMGTE Pro	Corvette Racing	1	0	1	0	0	N/A	DNF
2022	GT World Challenge Europe Endurance Cup	KCMG	1	0	0	0	0	12	25th
2022	24 Hours of Nürburgring - SP9 Pro	KCMG	1	0	0	0	0	N/A	DNF
2023	IMSA SportsCar Championship - GTP	Porsche Penske Motorsport	9	2	1	0	3	2691	4th
2023	24 Hours of Le Mans - Hypercar	Porsche Penske Motorsport	1	0	0	0	0	N/A	DNF
2024	IMSA SportsCar Championship - GTP	Porsche Penske Motorsport	9	2	1	2	5	2869	**2nd**
2024	24 Hours of Le Mans - Hypercar	Porsche Penske Motorsport	1	0	0	0	0	N/A	DNF
2025	IMSA SportsCar Championship - GTP	Porsche Penske Motorsport	9	3	0	3	4	2689	**3rd**
2025	24 Hours of Le Mans - Hypercar	Porsche Penske Motorsport	1	0	0	0	0	N/A	8th
2025	Mini Challenge UK	NAPA Racing UK	3	2	0	0	3	0	NC†
2026	IMSA SportsCar Championship - GTD Pro	AO Racing	10	0	1	1	5	2921	4th

† Guest driver ineligible for championship points.

=== Complete Formula 3 Euro Series results ===
(key) (Races in bold indicate pole position; races in italics indicate fastest lap)

Year	Entrant	Chassis	Engine	1	2	3	4	5	6	7	8	9	10	11	12	13	14	15	16	17	18	19	20	DC	Points
2009	Kolles & Heinz Union	Dallara F309/003	Mercedes	HOC; 1	HOC; 2	LAU; 1	LAU; 2	NOR; 1; 20	NOR; 2 Ret	ZAN; 1 Ret	ZAN; 2; 15	OSC; 1; 18	OSC; 2; 17	NÜR; 1; 18	NÜR; 2 Ret	BRH; 1 Ret	BRH; 2; 12	CAT; 1 Ret	CAT; 2 DNS	DIJ; 1	DIJ; 2	HOC; 1	HOC; 2	28th	0

=== Complete Porsche Supercup results ===
(key) (Races in bold indicate pole position) (Races in italics indicate fastest lap)

Year	Team	Car	1	2	3	4	5	6	7	8	9	10	11	12	13	DC	Points
2009	Konrad Motorsport	Porsche 997 GT3	BHR	BHR	ESP	MON	TUR	GBR	GER	HUN	ESP	BEL	ITA	UAE; 2	UAE; Ret	NC‡	0‡
2010	Konrad Motorsport	Porsche 997 GT3	BHR; 4	BHR; 3	ESP; 5	MON; 2	ESP; 8	**GBR**; 1	GER; Ret	**HUN**; 1	BEL; 6	**ITA**; 1				**2nd**	**146**
2011	Konrad Motorsport	Porsche 997 GT3	TUR; 2	ESP; 2	MON; 2	NÜR; Ret	GBR; 2	GER; DSQ	HUN; 9	BEL; 3	ITA; 5	UAE; 1	UAE; Ret			5th	129

^{‡} As a guest driver Tandy was ineligible for championship points.

=== Complete 24 Hours of Le Mans results ===
Year	Team	Co-Drivers	Car	Class	Laps	Pos.	Class Pos.
2011	(Germany) Team Felbermayr-Proton	(Saudi Arabia) Abdulaziz Al-Faisal (United States) Bryce Miller	Porsche 997 GT3-RSR	GTE; Pro	169	DNF	DNF
2014	(Germany) Porsche Team Manthey	(France) Patrick Pilet (Germany) Jörg Bergmeister	Porsche 911 RSR	GTE; Pro	309	36th	7th
2015	(Germany) Porsche Team	(Germany) Nico Hülkenberg (New Zealand) Earl Bamber	Porsche 919 Hybrid	LMP1	395	**1st**	**1st**
2016	(Germany) Porsche Motorsport	(France) Kévin Estre (France) Patrick Pilet	Porsche 911 RSR	GTE; Pro	135	DNF	DNF
2017	(Germany) Porsche LMP Team	(Switzerland) Neel Jani (Germany) André Lotterer	Porsche 919 Hybrid	LMP1	318	DNF	DNF
2018	(United States) Porsche GT Team	(France) Patrick Pilet (New Zealand) Earl Bamber	Porsche 911 RSR	GTE; Pro	334	27th	10th
2019	(United States) Porsche GT Team	(France) Patrick Pilet (New Zealand) Earl Bamber	Porsche 911 RSR	GTE; Pro	342	22nd	**3rd**
2020	(Russia) G-Drive Racing with Algarve	(United Kingdom) Oliver Jarvis (Republic of Ireland) Ryan Cullen	Aurus 01-Gibson	LMP2	105	DNF	DNF
2021	(United States) Corvette Racing	(United Kingdom) Alexander Sims (United States) Tommy Milner	Chevrolet Corvette C8.R	GTE; Pro	313	44th	6th
2022	(United States) Corvette Racing	(United Kingdom) Alexander Sims (United States) Tommy Milner	Chevrolet Corvette C8.R	GTE; Pro	260	DNF	DNF
2023	(Germany) Porsche Penske Motorsport	(France) Mathieu Jaminet (Brazil) Felipe Nasr	Porsche 963	Hypercar	84	DNF	DNF
2024	(Germany) Porsche Penske Motorsport	(France) Mathieu Jaminet (Brazil) Felipe Nasr	Porsche 963	Hypercar	211	DNF	DNF
2025	(Germany) Porsche Penske Motorsport	(Brazil) Felipe Nasr (Germany) Pascal Wehrlein	Porsche 963	Hypercar	386	8th	8th

=== Complete 24 Hours of Daytona results ===
Year	Team	Co-Drivers	Car	Class	Laps	Pos.	Class Pos.
2011	(United States) Burtin Racing	(France) Nicolas Armindo (Argentina) Claudio Burtin (Austria) Martin Ragginger	Porsche 997 GT3 Cup	GT	378	DNF	DNF
2012	(United States) NGT Motorsport	(Venezuela) Henrique Cisneros (United Kingdom) Sean Edwards (United States) Carlos Kauffmann	Porsche 997 GT3 Cup	GT	688	29th	18th
2013	(United States) Konrad Motorsport/Orbit Racing	(Denmark) Michael Christensen (Germany) Christian Engelhart (United States) Lance Willsey	Porsche 997 GT3 Cup	GT	181	DNF	DNF
2014	(United States) Porsche North America	(Austria) Richard Lietz (France) Patrick Pilet	Porsche 911 RSR	GTLM	679	6th	**1st**
2015	(United States) Porsche North America	(Denmark) Michael Christensen (Germany) Marc Lieb (France) Patrick Pilet	Porsche 911 RSR	GTLM	640	25th	5th
2016	(United States) Porsche North America	(France) Kévin Estre (France) Patrick Pilet	Porsche 911 RSR	GTLM	687	33rd	8th
2018	(United States) Porsche GT Team	(France) Frédéric Makowiecki (France) Patrick Pilet	Porsche 911 RSR-17	GTLM	753	20th	8th
2019	(United States) Porsche GT Team	(France) Frédéric Makowiecki (France) Patrick Pilet	Porsche 911 RSR-17	GTLM	569	14th	5th
2020	(United States) Porsche GT Team	(Australia) Matt Campbell (France) Frédéric Makowiecki	Porsche 911 RSR-19	GTLM	786	15th	**3rd**
2021	(United States) Corvette Racing	(United States) Tommy Milner (United Kingdom) Alexander Sims	Chevrolet Corvette C8.R	GTLM	770	12th	**2nd**
2022	(United States) Corvette Racing	(United States) Tommy Milner (Denmark) Marco Sørensen	Chevrolet Corvette C8.R GTD	GTD; Pro	626	45th	10th
2023	(Germany) Porsche Penske Motorsport	(United States) Dane Cameron (France) Mathieu Jaminet	Porsche 963	GTP	700	DNF	DNF
2024	(Germany) Porsche Penske Motorsport	(France) Kévin Estre (France) Mathieu Jaminet (Belgium) Laurens Vanthoor	Porsche 963	GTP	791	4th	4th
2025	(Germany) Porsche Penske Motorsport	(Brazil) Felipe Nasr (Belgium) Laurens Vanthoor	Porsche 963	GTP	781	**1st**	**1st**
2026	(United States) AO Racing	(United Kingdom) Harry King (Belgium) Alessio Picariello	Porsche 911 GT3 R (992.2)	GTD; Pro	660	34th	9th

=== Complete 24 Hours of Nürburgring results ===
Year	Team	Co-Drivers	Car	Class	Laps	Pos.	Class Pos.
2011	(Germany) Sponsorcard: MSC Adenau e.V.	(Germany) Julian Moritz Dercks (Germany) Florian Fricke (Netherlands) Patrick Huisman	Porsche 997 GT3 Cup	SP7	53	DNF	DNF
2012	(Germany) Manthey Racing	(Germany) Jörg Bergmeister (United States) Patrick Long (Germany) Marco Holzer	Porsche 997 GT3 R	SP9	107	DNF	DNF
2013	(Germany) Manthey Racing	(Germany) Jörg Bergmeister (Austria) Richard Lietz (Germany) Marco Holzer	Porsche 997 GT3 R	SP9	85	11th	10th
2016	(Germany) Manthey Racing	(New Zealand) Earl Bamber (France) Kévin Estre (France) Patrick Pilet	Porsche 911 GT3 R (991)	SP9	1	DNF	DNF
2018	(Germany) Manthey Racing	(Austria) Richard Lietz (France) Frédéric Makowiecki (France) Patrick Pilet	Porsche 911 GT3 R (991)	SP9	135	**1st**	**1st**
2019	(Germany) Manthey Racing	(Austria) Richard Lietz (France) Frédéric Makowiecki (France) Patrick Pilet	Porsche 911 GT3 R (991.2)	SP9	61	DNF	DNF
2021	(Germany) Frikadelli Racing Team	(New Zealand) Earl Bamber (Australia) Matt Campbell (France) Mathieu Jaminet	Porsche 911 GT3 R (991.2)	SP9	26	DNF	DNF
2022	(Hong Kong) KCMG	(New Zealand) Earl Bamber (Norway) Dennis Olsen	Porsche 911 GT3 R (991.2)	SP9; Pro	149	DNF	DNF

=== Complete British GT Championship results ===
(key) (Races in bold indicate pole position) (Races in italics indicate fastest lap)

Year	Team	Car	Class	1	2	3	4	5	6	7	8	9	10	DC	Points
2012	Motorbase Performance	Porsche 997 GT3-R	GT3	OUL; 1; 11	OUL; 2; 6	NÜR; 1 Ret	**NÜR**; **2**; 4	ROC; 1	BRH; 1	SNE; 1	SNE; 2	SIL; 1	DON; 1	21st	20
2013	Trackspeed	Porsche 997 GT3-R	GT3	OUL; 1; 2	OUL; 2; 1	**ROC**; **1** Ret	SIL; 1 Ret	SNE; 1; 23†	SNE; 2; 1	BRH; 1 DSQ	ZAN; 1 Ret	**ZAN**; **2**; 1	DON; 1 Ret	6th	93
2014	Trackspeed	Porsche 997 GT3-R	GT3	OUL; 1	OUL; 2	ROC; 1	SIL; 1	SNE; 1	SNE; 2	SPA; 1	SPA; 2	BRH; 1; 1	DON; 1; 7	11th	46.5

=== Complete American Le Mans Series results ===
(key) (Races in bold indicate pole position; results in italics indicate fastest lap)

Year	Entrant	Class	Make	Engine	1	2	3	4	5	6	7	8	9	10	Pos.	Points	Ref
2012	TRG	GTC	Porsche 911 GT3 Cup	Porsche M97/80 3.8 L Flat-6	SEB	LBH	LAG; 6	LRP	MOS	MDO	ELK	BAL	VIR		NC	0	
2012	Flying Lizard Motorsports	GT	Porsche 911 GT3-RSR	Porsche M97/80 4.0 L Flat-6										PET; 7	26th	8	
2013	Team Falken Tire	GT	Porsche 911 GT3-RSR	Porsche M97/80 4.0 L Flat-6	SEB; 3	LBH		LRP	MOS	ELK	BAL	COA	VIR	PET; 1	14th	41	
2013	NGT Motorsport	GTC	Porsche 911 GT3 Cup	Porsche M97/80 4.0 L Flat-6			LAG; 1								15th	22	

=== Complete European Le Mans Series results ===
(key) (Races in bold indicate pole position; results in italics indicate fastest lap)

Year	Team	Class	Make	Engine	1	2	3	4	5	Rank	Points
2013	Proton Competition	LMGTE	Porsche 911 GT3-RSR	Porsche M97/80 4.0 L Flat-6	SIL; 1	IMO	**RBR**; 8	HUN; 1	LEC; 3	3rd	70

=== Complete 24 Hours of Spa results ===
Year	Team	Co-Drivers	Car	Class	Laps	Pos.	Class Pos.
2013	(Belgium) Prospeed Competition	(Germany) Marco Holzer (Italy) Marco Mapelli	Porsche 997 GT3 R	Pro Cup	414	35th	14th
2019	(Germany) Rowe Racing	(France) Frédéric Makowiecki (France) Patrick Pilet	Porsche 911 GT3 R (991.2)	Pro Cup	363	2nd	2nd
2020	(Germany) Rowe Racing	(New Zealand) Earl Bamber (Belgium) Laurens Vanthoor	Porsche 911 GT3 R (991.2)	Pro Cup	527	1st	1st
2021	(Hong Kong) KCMG	(Belgium) Maxime Martin (Belgium) Laurens Vanthoor	Porsche 911 GT3 R (991.2)	Pro Cup	554	5th	5th
2022	(Hong Kong) KCMG	(Norway) Dennis Olsen (Belgium) Laurens Vanthoor	Porsche 911 GT3 R (991.2)	Pro Cup	536	7th	7th

=== Complete FIA World Endurance Championship results ===
(key) (Races in bold indicate pole position; results in italics indicate fastest lap)

Year	Entrant	Class	Chassis	Engine	1	2	3	4	5	6	7	8	9	Rank	Points
2014	Porsche Team Manthey	LMGTE Pro	Porsche 911 RSR	Porsche M97/80 4.0 L Flat-6	SIL; 2	SPA	LMS; 11	COA; 4	FUJ	FUJ	BHR	SÃO		17th	31
2015	KCMG	LMP2	Oreca 05	Nissan VK45DE 4.5 L V8	SIL; 4			**NÜR**; 1	COA	FUJ; Ret	SHA; 3	BHR; 2		6th	71
2015	Porsche Team	LMP1	Porsche 919 Hybrid	Porsche 9R9 2.0 L Turbo V4		SPA; 6	LMS; 1							8th	70.5
2017	Porsche LMP Team	LMP1	Porsche 919 Hybrid	Porsche 9R9 2.0 L Turbo V4 (Hybrid)	SIL; 3	**SPA**; 4	LMS; Ret	NÜR; 2	MEX; 2	**COA**; 2	FUJ; 3	SHA; 3	**BHR**; 3	4th	129
2022	Corvette Racing	LMGTE Pro	Chevrolet Corvette C8.R	Chevrolet LT6.R 5.5 L V8	SEB; 2	SPA; 4	**LMS**; Ret	MNZ; 1	FUJ; 5	BHR; 2				6th	102

=== Complete IMSA SportsCar Championship results ===
(key) (Races in bold indicate pole position) (Races in italics indicate fastest lap)

Year	Entrant	Class	Chassis	Engine	1	2	3	4	5	6	7	8	9	10	11	Rank	Points	Ref
2014	Porsche North America	GTLM	Porsche 911 RSR	Porsche M97/80 4.0 L Flat-6	DAY; 1	SEB; 9	LBH; 4	LGA; 9	WGL; 5	MOS; 5	IND; 10	ELK; 10	VIR; 10	COA; 11	**PET**; 5	11th	279	
2015	Porsche North America	GTLM	Porsche 911 RSR	Porsche M97/80 4.0 L Flat-6	DAY; 5	SEB; 5	LBH	LGA	WGL; 6	**MOS**; 1	ELK; 1	**VIR**; 1	AUS; 3	PET; 1		9th	255	
2016	Porsche North America	GTLM	Porsche 911 RSR	Porsche M97/80 4.0 L Flat-6	**DAY**; 8	SEB; 10	LBH; 1	LGA; 8	WGL; 9	MOS; 8	LIM; 6	ELK; 7	VIR; 6	AUS; 2	PET; 10	8th	285	
2017	Porsche GT Team	GTLM	Porsche 911 RSR	Porsche M97/80 4.0 L Flat-6	DAY	SEB	LBH	AUS	WGL	MOS	LIM	ELK	VIR	LGA	PET; 6	25th	25	
2018	Porsche GT Team	GTLM	Porsche 911 RSR	Porsche M97/80 4.0 L Flat-6	DAY; 8	SEB; 1	LBH; 6	MOH; 6	WGL; 3	**MOS**; 4	LIM; 5	ELK; 5	VIR; 8	LGA; 8	PET; 1	7th	299	
2019	Porsche GT Team	GTLM	Porsche 911 RSR	Porsche M97/80 4.0 L Flat-6	**DAY**; 5	**SEB**; 1	**LBH**; 5	MDO; 3	WGL; 1	MOS; 3	LIM; 4	ELK; 7	VIR; 1	LGA; 8	PET; 6	2nd	317	
2020	Porsche GT Team	GTLM	Porsche 911 RSR-19	Porsche M97/80 4.2 L Flat-6	**DAY**; 3	DAY; 3	SEB; 6	ELK; 4	**VIR**; 3	**ATL**; 4	MDO	CLT; 5	PET; 1	LGA; 3	SEB; 1	5th	297	
2021	Corvette Racing	GTLM	Chevrolet Corvette C8.R	Chevrolet LT6.R 5.5 L V8	**DAY**; 2	SEB; 5	**DET**; 1†	WGL; 4	WGL; 2	LIM; 2	ELK; 3	LGA; 1	LBH; 1	**VIR**; 1	PET; 4	2nd	3448	
2022	Corvette Racing	GTD Pro	Chevrolet Corvette C8.R GTD	Chevrolet LT6.R 5.5 L V8	DAY; 10	SEB	LBH	LGA	WGL	MOS	LIM	ELK	VIR	PET		35th	234	
2023	Porsche Penske Motorsport	GTP	Porsche 963	Porsche 9RD 4.6 L V8	DAY; 8	SEB; 3	LBH; 1	LGA; 2	**WGL**; 9	MOS; 5	ELK; 7	IMS; 1	PET; 10			4th	2691	
2024	Porsche Penske Motorsport	GTP	Porsche 963	Porsche 9RD 4.6 L V8	DAY; 4	SEB; 9	LBH; 4	LGA; 1	**DET**; 2	WGL; 3	ELK; 1	IMS; 10	PET; 2			2nd	2869	
2025	Porsche Penske Motorsport	GTP	Porsche 963	Porsche 9RD 4.6 L V8	DAY; 1	SEB; 1	LBH; 1	LGA; 2	DET; 4	WGL; 11	ELK; 11	IMS; 12	PET; 10			3rd	2689	
2026	AO Racing	GTD Pro	Porsche 911 GT3 R (992)	Porsche M97/80 4.2 L Flat-6	DAY; 9	SEB; 2	LGA; 3	DET; 9	WGL; 7	MOS; 2	**ELK**; 2	VIR; 9	IMS; 10	PET; 2		4th	2921	

^{†} Non-points event.

Sporting positions
Preceded by Richard Tannahill	Formula Ford Festival; Winner; 2007	Succeeded by Wayne Boyd
Preceded by Nicolas Armindo	Porsche Carrera Cup Germany; Champion; 2011	Succeeded by René Rast
Preceded by Marcel Fässler; André Lotterer; Benoît Tréluyer	Winner of the 24 Hours of Le Mans; 2015; With: Earl Bamber & Nico Hülkenberg	Succeeded by Romain Dumas; Neel Jani; Marc Lieb
Preceded by Jesse Krohn; John Edwards	Michelin Endurance Cup; GTLM Champion; 2021; With: Tommy Milner	Succeeded by Davide Rigon; Daniel Serra (GTD Pro)
Preceded by Felipe Nasr; Dane Cameron	Michelin Endurance Cup; Champion; 2025; With: Felipe Nasr	Succeeded by Felipe Nasr; Julien Andlauer; Laurin Heinrich
