= 2011 Porsche Supercup =

19th Porsche Supercup season

The 2011 Porsche Mobil 1 Supercup season was the 19th Porsche Supercup season. It began on 8 May at Turkey's Istanbul Park and finished on 13 November at the Yas Marina Circuit in the United Arab Emirates, after eleven races.

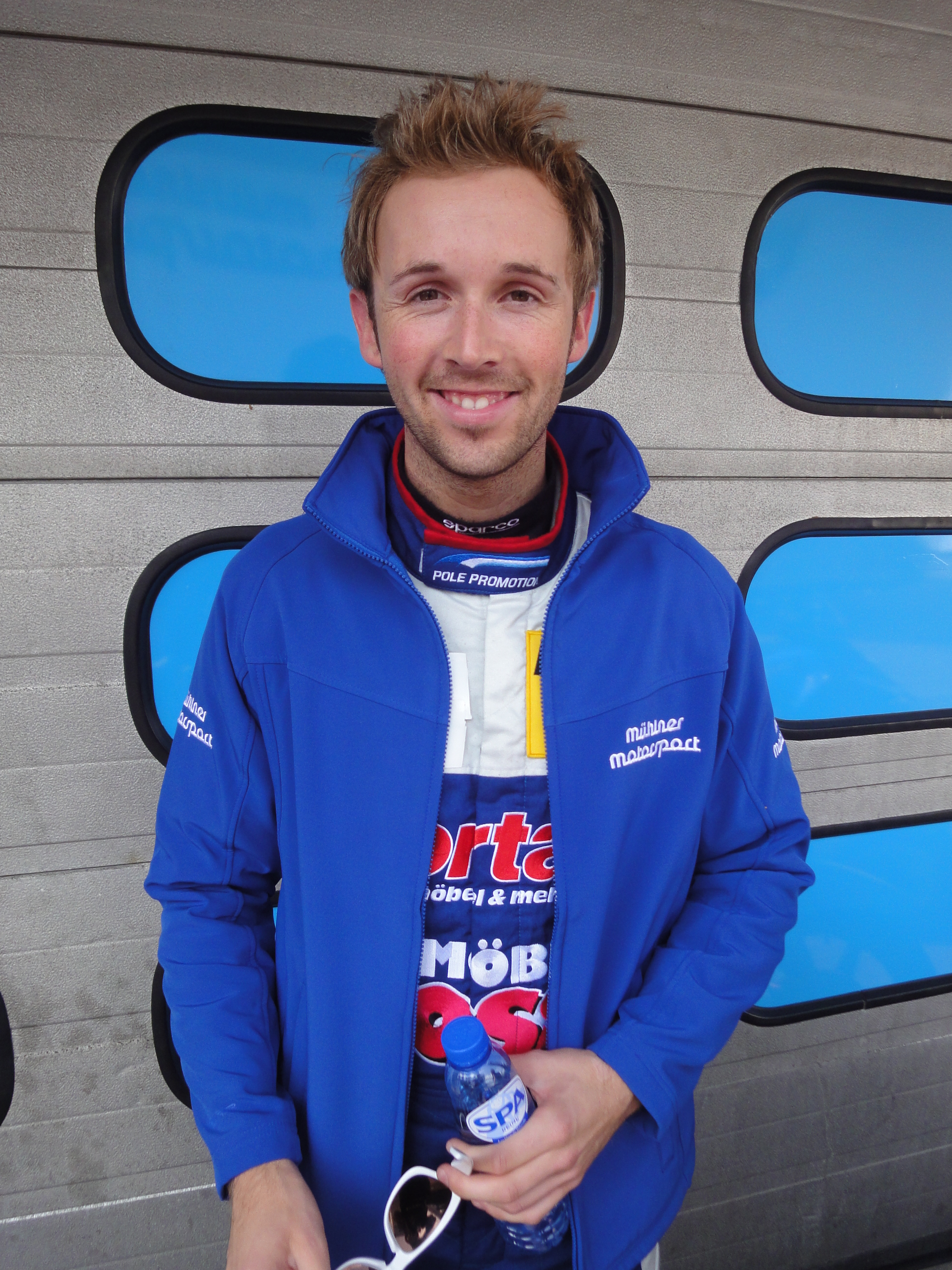
René Rast (pictured in 2010) successfully defended his Drivers' Championship title

== Teams and drivers ==
Team	No.	Drivers	Rounds
(Austria) Veltins Lechner Racing	1	(Germany) René Rast	All
(Austria) Veltins Lechner Racing	2	(Austria) Norbert Siedler	All
(Austria) Veltins Lechner Racing	37	(Netherlands) Oskar Slingerland	3
(Austria) Veltins Lechner Racing	37	(Austria) Clemens Schmid	10
(Germany) Konrad Motorsport	3	(United Kingdom) Nick Tandy	All
(Germany) Konrad Motorsport	4	(Germany) Christian Engelhart	All
Konrad Motorsport Austria	5	(Austria) Andreas Mayerl	1–9
Konrad Motorsport Austria	6	(Austria) Mathias Lauda	All
(Germany) Sanitec Aquiles MRS Team	7	(United States) William Langhorne	All
(Germany) Sanitec Aquiles MRS Team	8	(Argentina) Nicolás Filiberti	1–3
(Germany) Sanitec Aquiles MRS Team	8	(New Zealand) Matt Halliday	5–6
(Germany) Sanitec Aquiles MRS Team	8	(Spain) Isaac Tutumlu	7
(Germany) Sanitec Aquiles MRS Team	8	(Denmark) Nicki Thiim	8–9
(Germany) Sanitec Aquiles MRS Team	8	(United States) Melanie Snow	10
(Germany) Sanitec Aquiles MRS Team	32	(Turkey) Yucel Ozbek	5
(Germany) Sanitec Aquiles MRS Team	810	(United States) Melanie Snow	4
(Poland) VERVA Racing Team	9	(Slovakia) Štefan Rosina	All
(Poland) VERVA Racing Team	10	(Poland) Kuba Giermaziak	All
(Germany) Attempto Racing	11	(Poland) Robert Lukas	1–3, 5–9
(Germany) Attempto Racing	11	(Denmark) Nicki Thiim	4
(Germany) Attempto Racing	11	(Spain) Isaac Tutumlu	10
(Germany) Attempto Racing	12	(France) Kévin Estre	All
(Germany) Attempto Racing	47	(Spain) Isaac Tutumlu	8
(Germany) Team Abu Dhabi by Tolimit	14	(United Arab Emirates) Khaled Al Qubaisi	All
(Germany) Team Abu Dhabi by Tolimit	15	(Netherlands) Jeroen Bleekemolen	All
(Germany) Team Abu Dhabi by Tolimit	16	(United Kingdom) Sean Edwards	All
(Netherlands) Team Bleekemolen	17	(Netherlands) Sebastiaan Bleekemolen	All
(Netherlands) Team Bleekemolen	18	(Netherlands) Patrick Huisman	All
(Netherlands) Team Bleekemolen	19	(Italy) Alessandro Zampedri	1–3, 5–7, 9–10
(Netherlands) Team Bleekemolen	19	(Netherlands) Bas Schothorst	8
(Germany) MRS Team PZ Aschaffenburg	30	(Germany) Thomas Langer	1–3
(Germany) MRS Team PZ Aschaffenburg	31	(Turkey) Cenk Ceyişakar	1
(Germany) MRS Team PZ Aschaffenburg	31	(Spain) Isaac Tutumlu	3
(Germany) MRS Team PZ Aschaffenburg	32	(Turkey) Yadel Oskan	1
(Germany) MRS Team PZ Aschaffenburg	32	(New Zealand) Matt Halliday	3
(France) PRO GT	33	(France) Roland Bervillé	2–3
(France) PRO GT	34	(France) Henry Hassid	2–3
(Italy) Antonelli Motorsport	35	(Italy) Christian Passuti	3, 8–9
(Italy) Antonelli Motorsport	36	(Italy) Angelo Proietti	3, 9
(Italy) Antonelli Motorsport	36	(Italy) Massimo Giondi	8
(Italy) Antonelli Motorsport	48	(Italy) Gianluca Giraudi	9
(Austria) Lechner Racing	37	(Netherlands) Oskar Slingerland	8
(Austria) Lechner Racing	46	(New Zealand) Peter Scharmach	8
(United Kingdom) SAS International	38	(United Kingdom) Michael Meadows	5
(United Kingdom) SAS International	39	(United Kingdom) James Sutton	5
(United Kingdom) Porsche Cars Great Britain	41	(Oman) Ahmad Al Harthy	5
(United Kingdom) Porsche Cars Great Britain	42	(United Kingdom) Benji Hetherington	5
(United Kingdom) Porsche Cars Great Britain	43	(United Kingdom) Andrew Shelley	5
(Germany) Schnabl Engineering	44	(United Kingdom) Sam Tordoff	5
(Germany) Schnabl Engineering	45	(United Kingdom) Keith Webster	5
(Italy) Ebimotors	49	(Italy) Marco Mapelli	9
(Italy) Ebimotors	50	(Italy) Alessandro Balzan	9
(Italy) Petri Corse	51	(Italy) Vito Postiglione	9
(Italy) Petri Corse	52	(Italy) Andrea Amici	9
(Germany) Haribo Racing Team	88	(Germany) Hans-Guido Riegel	6
(Germany) Haribo Racing Team	88	(Germany) Christian Menzel	10
(Germany) Haribo Racing Team	99	(Germany) Christian Menzel	6
(Germany) Haribo Racing Team	99	(Saudi Arabia) Abdulaziz Al Faisal	10
(Austria) GT3 Cup Challenge Middle East	811	(Saudi Arabia) Abdulaziz Al Faisal	4
(Austria) GT3 Cup Challenge Middle East	812	(Germany) Johannes Waimer	4
(Germany) Motopark	815	(Germany) Lance David Arnold	4
(Germany) Motopark	816	(Germany) Timo Rumpfkeil	4

== Race calendar and results ==
Round		Circuit	Country	Date	Pole position	Fastest lap	Winning driver	Winning team
1		(Turkey) Istanbul Park	Turkey	8 May	(Germany) Christian Engelhart	(United Kingdom) Nick Tandy	(Germany) Christian Engelhart	(Germany) Konrad Motorsport
2		(Spain) Circuit de Catalunya	Spain	22 May	(United Kingdom) Sean Edwards	(United Kingdom) Nick Tandy	(United Kingdom) Sean Edwards	(Germany) Team Abu Dhabi by Tolimit
3		Circuit de Monaco	Monaco	29 May	(Germany) René Rast	(Germany) René Rast	(Germany) René Rast	(Austria) Veltins Lechner Racing
4		(Germany) Nürburgring Nordschleife	Germany	25 June	(Austria) Norbert Siedler	(Germany) René Rast	(Germany) René Rast	(Austria) Veltins Lechner Racing
5		(United Kingdom) Silverstone Circuit	United Kingdom	10 July	(Germany) René Rast	(United Kingdom) Nick Tandy	(Germany) René Rast	(Austria) Veltins Lechner Racing
6		(Germany) Nürburgring GP	Germany	24 July	(Poland) Kuba Giermaziak	(Germany) Christian Engelhart	(Germany) René Rast	(Austria) Veltins Lechner Racing
7		(Hungary) Hungaroring	Hungary	31 July	(France) Kévin Estre	(United Kingdom) Sean Edwards	(Poland) Kuba Giermaziak	(Poland) VERVA Racing Team
8		(Belgium) Circuit de Spa-Francorchamps	Belgium	28 August	(Poland) Kuba Giermaziak	(Poland) Kuba Giermaziak	(Poland) Kuba Giermaziak	(Poland) VERVA Racing Team
9		(Italy) Autodromo Nazionale Monza	Italy	11 September	(Italy) Alessandro Balzan	(France) Kévin Estre	(France) Kévin Estre	(Germany) Attempto Racing
10	R1	(United Arab Emirates) Yas Marina Circuit	United Arab Emirates	12 November	(France) Kévin Estre	(United Kingdom) Nick Tandy	(United Kingdom) Nick Tandy	(Germany) Konrad Motorsport
10	R2	(United Arab Emirates) Yas Marina Circuit	United Arab Emirates	13 November	(Germany) René Rast	(Germany) René Rast	(Germany) René Rast	(Austria) Veltins Lechner Racing

== Championship standings ==
=== Drivers' Championship ===
Pos	Driver	IST (Turkey)	CAT (Spain)	MON (Monaco)	NNS (Germany)	SIL (United Kingdom)	NÜR (Germany)	HUN (Hungary)	SPA (Belgium)	MNZ (Italy)	YMC (United Arab Emirates)		Points
1	(Germany) René Rast	5	7	**1**	1	**1**	1	Ret	2	2	2	**1**	181
2	(Austria) Norbert Siedler	3	8	7	**2**	3	4	4	7	4	4	7	145
3	(Poland) Kuba Giermaziak	7	3	5	12	8	**2**	1	**1**	6	10	6	140
4	(United Kingdom) Sean Edwards	4	**1**	3	4	10	3	3	6	Ret	6	4	140
5	(United Kingdom) Nick Tandy	2	2	2	Ret	2	DSQ	9	3	5	1	Ret	129
6	(Netherlands) Jeroen Bleekemolen	6	5	4	6	6	6	2	4	13	7	5	129
7	(France) Kévin Estre	8	4	Ret	5	4	Ret	**5**	9	1	**3**	2	127
8	(Germany) Christian Engelhart	**1**	9	12	10	5	8	Ret	5	18	5	3	106
9	(Slovakia) Štefan Rosina	10	6	Ret	8	7	5	7	10	9	8	13	83
10	(Netherlands) Patrick Huisman	9	10	11	7	9	7	15	11	7	9	9	76
11	(Netherlands) Sebastiaan Bleekemolen	11	12	6	9	14	16	Ret	8	Ret	12	14	49
12	(Austria) Mathias Lauda	15	14	15	14	18	11	11	Ret	14	13	10	40
13	(Poland) Robert Lukas	12	11	9		19	14	6	12	Ret			34
14	(Italy) Alessandro Zampedri	Ret	13	8		17	13	8		Ret	Ret	8	34
15	(United States) William Langhorne	14	Ret	16	13	20	10	14	19	17	16	16	33
16	(Austria) Andreas Mayerl	Ret	17	14	15	21	15	13	16	19			20
17	(United Arab Emirates) Khaled Al Qubaisi	17	Ret	Ret	16†	22	17	10	18	21†	17	Ret	15
18	(New Zealand) Matt Halliday			10		11	12						10
19	(Argentina) Nicolás Filiberti	13	15	18									5
Guest drivers ineligible for championship points
	(Italy) Alessandro Balzan									**3**			0
	(Germany) Lance David Arnold				3								0
	(Italy) Christian Passuti			13					13	8			0
	(Germany) Christian Menzel						9				11	11	0
	(Italy) Marco Mapelli									10			0
	(Denmark) Nicki Thiim				Ret				14	11			0
	(Germany) Timo Rumpfkeil				11								0
	(United Kingdom) James Sutton					11							0
	(Spain) Isaac Tutumlu			DSQ				12	22		DSQ	15	0
	(Saudi Arabia) Abdulaziz Al Faisal				Ret						15	12	0
	(Italy) Vito Postiglione									12			0
	(United Kingdom) Michael Meadows					13							0
	(Austria) Clemens Schmid										14	17	0
	(United Kingdom) Sam Tordoff					15							0
	(Netherlands) Bas Schothorst								15				0
	(Italy) Gianluca Giraudi									15			0
	(Italy) Angelo Proietti			17						16			0
	(France) Henry Hassid		16	19									0
	(Turkey) Yadel Oskan	16											0
	(United Kingdom) Benji Hetherington					16							0
	(Germany) Johannes Waimer				17†								0
	(New Zealand) Peter Scharmach								17				0
	(United States) Melanie Snow				Ret						18	18	0
	(France) Roland Bervillé		18	20									0
	(Turkey) Cenk Ceyişakar	18											0
	(Germany) Thomas Langer	Ret	19	DNQ									0
	(Netherlands) Oskar Slingerland			DNQ					20				0
	(Italy) Andrea Amici									20			0
	(Italy) Massimo Giondi								21				0
	(United Kingdom) Keith Webster					23							0
	(United Kingdom) Andrew Shelley					24							0
	(Turkey) Yucel Ozbek					25†							0
	(Oman) Ahmad Al Harthy					Ret							0
	(Germany) Hans-Guido Riegel						Ret						0
Pos	Driver	IST (Turkey)	CAT (Spain)	MON (Monaco)	NNS (Germany)	SIL (United Kingdom)	NÜR (Germany)	HUN (Hungary)	SPA (Belgium)	MNZ (Italy)	YMC (United Arab Emirates)		Points

Colour	Result
Gold	Winner
Silver	Second place
Bronze	Third place
Green	Points classification
Blue	Non-points classification
Blue	Non-classified finish (NC)
Purple	Retired, not classified (Ret)
Red	Did not qualify (DNQ)
Red	Did not pre-qualify (DNPQ)
Black	Disqualified (DSQ)
White	Did not start (DNS)
White	Withdrew (WD)
White	Race cancelled (C)
Blank	Did not practice (DNP)
Blank	Did not arrive (DNA)
Blank	Excluded (EX)

**Bold** – Pole
Italics – Fastest Lap

† — Drivers did not finish the race, but were classified as they completed over 90% of the race distance.

=== Teams' Championship ===
Pos	Team	IST (Turkey)	CAT (Spain)	MON (Monaco)	NNS (Germany)	SIL (United Kingdom)	NÜR (Germany)	HUN (Hungary)	SPA (Belgium)	MNZ (Italy)	YMC (United Arab Emirates)		Points
1	(Austria) Veltins Lechner Racing	3	7	1	1	1	1	4	2	2	2	1	318
1	(Austria) Veltins Lechner Racing	5	8	7	2	3	4	Ret	7	4	4	7	318
2	(Germany) Team Abu Dhabi by Tolimit	4	1	3	4	6	3	2	4	13	6	4	266
2	(Germany) Team Abu Dhabi by Tolimit	6	5	4	6	10	6	3	6	Ret	7	5	266
3	(Germany) Konrad Motorsport	1	2	2	10	2	8	9	3	5	1	3	234
3	(Germany) Konrad Motorsport	2	9	12	Ret	5	DSQ	Ret	5	18	5	Ret	234
4	(Poland) VERVA Racing Team	7	3	5	8	7	2	1	1	6	8	6	220
4	(Poland) VERVA Racing Team	10	6	Ret	12	8	5	7	10	9	10	13	220
5	(Germany) Attempto Racing	8	4	9	5	4	14	5	9	1	3	2	165
5	(Germany) Attempto Racing	12	11	Ret	Ret	19	Ret	6	12	Ret	DSQ	15	165
6	(Netherlands) Team Bleekemolen	9	10	6	7	9	7	15	8	7	9	9	125
6	(Netherlands) Team Bleekemolen	Ret	12	11	9	14	13	Ret	11	Ret	12	14	125
7	(Germany) SANITEC Aquiles MRS Team	13	15	16	13	12	10	12	14	11	16	16	75
7	(Germany) SANITEC Aquiles MRS Team	14	Ret	18	Ret	20	12	14	19	17	18	18	75
8	Konrad Motorsport Austria	15	14	14	14	18	11	11	16	14	13	10	68
8	Konrad Motorsport Austria	Ret	17	15	15	21	15	13	Ret	19			68
Guest teams ineligible for championship points
	(Italy) Ebimotors									3			0
	(Italy) Ebimotors									10			0
	(Germany) Motopark				3								0
	(Germany) Motopark				11								0
	(Italy) Antonelli Motorsport			13					13	8			0
	(Italy) Antonelli Motorsport			17					21	15			0
	(Germany) Haribo Racing Team						9				11		0
	(Germany) Haribo Racing Team						Ret				15		0
	(Germany) MRS Team PZ Aschaffenburg	16	19	10									0
	(Germany) MRS Team PZ Aschaffenburg	18		DSQ									0
	(United Kingdom) SAS International					11							0
	(United Kingdom) SAS International					13							0
	(Italy) Petri Corse									12			0
	(Italy) Petri Corse									20			0
	(Germany) Schnabl Engineering					15							0
	(Germany) Schnabl Engineering					23							0
	(France) PRO GT		16	19									0
	(France) PRO GT		18	20									0
	(United Kingdom) Porsche Cars Great Britain					16							0
	(United Kingdom) Porsche Cars Great Britain					24							0
	(Austria) Lechner Racing								17				0
	(Austria) Lechner Racing								20				0
	(Austria) GT3 Cup Challenge Middle East				17†								0
	(Austria) GT3 Cup Challenge Middle East				Ret								0
Pos	Team	IST (Turkey)	CAT (Spain)	MON (Monaco)	NNS (Germany)	SIL (United Kingdom)	NÜR (Germany)	HUN (Hungary)	SPA (Belgium)	MNZ (Italy)	YMC (United Arab Emirates)		Points

Colour	Result
Gold	Winner
Silver	Second place
Bronze	Third place
Green	Points classification
Blue	Non-points classification
Blue	Non-classified finish (NC)
Purple	Retired, not classified (Ret)
Red	Did not qualify (DNQ)
Red	Did not pre-qualify (DNPQ)
Black	Disqualified (DSQ)
White	Did not start (DNS)
White	Withdrew (WD)
White	Race cancelled (C)
Blank	Did not practice (DNP)
Blank	Did not arrive (DNA)
Blank	Excluded (EX)

Position	1st	2nd	3rd	4th	5th	6th	7th	8th	9th	10th	11th	12th	13th	14th	15th	Pole	Ref
Points	20	18	16	14	12	10	9	8	7	6	5	4	3	2	1	2	
