= Lincroft Academy =

Location
- Station Road; Oakley; Bedfordshire, MK43 7RE; England
- 52°10′08″N 0°31′16″W

Information
- Type: Academy
- Local authority: Bedford Borough Council
- Trust: Cambridge Meridian Academies Trust
- Department for Education URN: 136471 Tables
- Ofsted: Reports
- Academy Principal: Emma Appadoo
- Gender: Co-educational
- Age: 11 to 16
- Website: www.lincroft.academy

Lincroft Academy is a co-educational secondary school located in Oakley in the English county of Bedfordshire.

It was established as a secondary modern school in the early 1960s on land that was part of Oakley Grange. In the early 1970s it became a middle school educating pupils aged 9 to 13. In February 2011 the school converted to academy status and adopted its present name. In 2017 it became a secondary school educating pupils aged 11 to 16.

Today the school forms part of the Meridian Trust which includes 31 schools.

== Notable former pupils ==
- Oliver Gavin, racing driver
- Paula Radcliffe, marathon runner and olympian
- Nick Tandy, racing driver
