= 2019 24 Hours of Daytona =

57th annual 24 Hours of Daytona endurance race

Previous: 2018	Next: 2020
Index: Races | Winners

Map of the Daytona International Speedway combined road course

The 2019 24 Hours of Daytona (formally the 2019 Rolex 24 at Daytona) was an International Motor Sports Association (IMSA)-sanctioned endurance sports car race held at the Daytona International Speedway combined road course in Daytona Beach, Florida, on January 26–27, 2019. It was the 57th running of the race, and the first of 12 races in the 2019 IMSA WeatherTech Sportscar Championship, and the first of four rounds of the 2019 Michelin Endurance Cup.

The race was ended ahead of the 22nd hour, due to heavy rainfall. The race was won overall by Renger van der Zande, Jordan Taylor, Fernando Alonso, and Kamui Kobayashi in the #10 Wayne Taylor Racing Cadillac DPi-V.R. The LMP2 class was won by the #18 DragonSpeed Oreca 07, piloted by Pastor Maldonado, Roberto Gonzalez, Sebastián Saavedra and Ryan Cullen. The GTLM class was won by the #25 BMW Team RLL BMW M8 GTE of Connor de Phillippi, Augusto Farfus, Philipp Eng, and Colton Herta. The GTD class was won for a second consecutive year by the #11 GRT Grasser Racing Team Lamborghini Huracan GT3 Evo of Rolf Ineichen, Mirko Bortolotti, Rik Breukers, and Christian Engelhart.

== Background ==
=== Preview ===
Daytona International Speedway in 2015

NASCAR founder Bill France Sr., who built the Daytona International Speedway in 1959, conceived the 24 Hours of Daytona as a race to attract European sports car endurance racing to the United States and provide international exposure to Daytona. It is informally considered part of the "Triple Crown of Endurance Racing" with the 12 Hours of Sebring and the 24 Hours of Le Mans.

International Motor Sports Association's (IMSA) president Scott Atherton confirmed the race was part of the schedule for the 2019 IMSA SportsCar Championship (IMSA SCC) in August 2018. It was the sixth consecutive year it was part of the IMSA SCC, and the 57th 24 Hours of Daytona. The 24 Hours of Daytona was the first of twelve scheduled sports car endurance races of 2019 by IMSA, and the first of four races of the Michelin Endurance Cup MEC). It took place at the 12-turn 3.56 mi (5.73 km) Daytona International Speedway combined road course in Daytona Beach, Florida, from January 26 to 27.

=== Regulation changes ===
Prior to the 2019 WeatherTech SportsCar Championship, a raft of regulation changes were made, which saw significant changes to both Prototypes and GT3 cars entered in the 2019 event. The Prototype class, which previously combined Daytona Prototype International cars, alongside Le Mans Prototype LMP2 cars was now split into 2 separate classes, the Daytona Prototype International (DPi) class, and the Le Mans Prototype 2 (LMP2) class. The DPi class would be the top class of the Championship, and will feature teams with full Professional Lineups running Daytona Prototype International cars, with its own class-based Balance of Performance (BoP). The LMP2 class would be the lower prototype class of the 2, featuring Global Specification LMP2 cars, and Pro-Am lineups, with no BoP being applied to the class. The Pro-Am classes in the Championship (LMP2 and GTD) were also now required to adhere to driver rating requirements, with each car being allowed only 2 Platinum/Gold rated drivers for the Rolex 24, and one Platinum/Gold rated driver for the other Endurance Races, alongside the requirement of 1 Bronze/Silver rated driver for every Sprint race. Bronze or Silver rated drivers would also be required to start the race in these categories. Cars in the DPi, LMP2, as well as the GTD classes will also run on Michelin tyres, instead of Continentals while the GT Le Mans (GTLM) class would continue to be an open-tyre class.

=== Entry list ===
Ahead of the Roar Before the 24 tests at the track, IMSA released an entry list of the teams due to participate in the compulsory 3 day tests. The entry list listed 47 teams across the four classes: 11 entries in the DPi class, 4 in the LMP2 class, as well as 9 in the GTLM class, featuring Group GTE Cars, as well as 23 in the GT Daytona (GTD) class. Each car was driven by two drivers who were to complete in the whole WeatherTech Sportscar Championship season, alongside 1–2 additional drivers, with one of the two additional drivers participating in the whole Michelin Endurance Cup season. These drivers came from a variety of categories, such as the FIA World Endurance Championship (Fernando Alonso, Kamui Kobayashi, Harry Tincknell), the IndyCar Series (Simon Pagenaud, Alexander Rossi), the Deutsche Tourenwagen Masters (René Rast, Loïc Duval).

== Testing ==
=== Pre-testing Balance of Performance (BoP) ===
Ahead of the Roar Before the 24 Tests, IMSA issued a pre-test BoP, on December 21, 2018, aiming to create parity in each class among the cars, as well as to separate the performances of cars in each class. The DPis were given a 10 kg weight reduction, as well as increased boost pressure for Turbocharged Engines, while Naturally Aspirated Engines received a larger air restrictor. The LMP2 cars were given a 10 kg weight addition, alongside a five-litre reduction in fuel capacity, and a 4 second increased refuelling time. Changes were also made to both the GTLM class, with the BMW M8 GTE, and the Porsche 911 RSR getting a weight break, with the Ferrari 488 GTE was given a 5 kg weight increase, the Ford GT a 20 kg weight increase, and the Corvette C7.R remaining unchanged. The GTD class saw several changes

=== Roar Before the 24 Tests ===
The Roar Before the 24 tests occurred from January 4 to 6, 2019, with all cars participating in the test. The first session on Friday morning saw the #77 Mazda RT-24P entered by Mazda Team Joest top timesheets with a 1:35.989 lap, while the #52 Oreca 07 entered by PR1/Mathiasen Motorsports topped the LMP2 category with a 1:39.828 by Gabriel Aubry. GTLM was topped by #911 911 RSR, with Patrick Pilet at the wheel setting a 1:44.866, while Jeroen Bleekemolen set a 1:47.188 in the #33 AMG GT3. The second session on Friday afternoon had the #10 Cadillac DPi-V.R of Wayne Taylor Racing top the session with a 1:36.596 by Kamui Kobayashi, while Gabriel Aubrey topped the LMP2 category again with 1:39.575. Davide Rigon set a 1:44.718 in the #62 Risi Competizione Ferrari 488 GTE Evo, to top GTLM, while the #33 topped GTD once more with a 1:46.452 from Jeroen Bleekemolen.

The first session on Saturday morning saw the #55 Mazda RT-24P set the pace, with Harry Tincknell setting a 1:34.925. The #52 Oreca 07 topped the timesheet again in LMP2 with a 1:38.107 from Matt McMurry. The #912 Porsche 911 RSR topped GTLM, with a 1:43.862 from Mathieu Jaminet, while the #540 Black Swan Racing 911 GT3 R topped the GTD category with a 1:45.919 from Matteo Cairoli. The Afternoon session was led by the #10 Wayne Taylor Racing Cadillac DPi-V.R with Renger Van Der Zande setting a 1:34.534, with LMP2 being led once more by Gabriel Aubry in the #52 Oreca with a 1:37.083 lap. GTLM was led by the #67 Ford GT with Richard Westbrook setting a 1:43.148, with GTD being led by Trent Hindman in the #86 Meyer Shank Racing w/ Curb-Agajanian Acura NSX GT3, with a 1:45.533 lap. The Night session saw Jonathan Bomarito set the pace in the #55 Mazda RT-24P, with a 1:34.533, while the #52 led LMP2 once more, with a 1:36.990 from Gabriel Aubry. GTLM saw Nick Tandy set a 1:43.402 in the #911 Porsche 911 RSR, with GTD led by the #13 Via Italia Racing Ferrari 488 GT3 Evo with a 1:45.842 from Victor Franzoni. GTD had a Qualifying session on the day itself, which was meant to allocate garages for the teams, with Ana Beatriz securing the top spot with a 1:45.537 in the #57 Meyer Shank Racing Acura NSX GT3, after P1 Motorsport was disqualified from the session for using a gold driver (Dominik Baumann), in spite of it setting the fastest time.

The morning session on Sunday saw Harry Tincknell top the lap times in the #55 Mazda RT-24P, with a 1:34.224, while Ben Hanley led LMP2 with a 1:35.975 in the 81 DragonSpeed Oreca 07, and GTLM was led by Richard Westbrook in the #67 Ford GT with a 1:43.083. The Last Session on Sunday, where only 14 cars ran, saw the #54 CORE Autosport Nissan-Onroak DPi top the times with a 1:35.176 from Loic Duval, while LMP2 was led by the #81 DragonSpeed Oreca 07, with a 1:36.188 from Nicolas Lapierre, and GTLM led by the #911 Porsche 911 RSR, with a 1:43.848 from Patrick Pilet. The Qualifying for DPi, LMP2 and GTLM saw Oliver Jarvis earn the top spot for Mazda Team Joest in the #77 Mada RT-24P, with a 1:33.398 which also unofficially broke the track record, while the #52 topped the LMP2 class with a 1:35.930 from Gabriel Aubry, while GTLM was led by the #3 Corvette C7.R with a 1:42.651 from Jan Magnussen.

=== Post-testing Balance of Performance adjustments ===
On January 16, 2019, IMSA released a technical bulletin with regards to the Balance of Performance of the cars competing in the Rolex 24. Unlike previous years. there were only minor tweaks to selected cars, and saw no significant performance related adjustments. In the Daytona Prototype International class, 3 of the 4 cars saw changes to their fuel capacity, with the Acura ARX-05 and Mazda RT24-P each losing 2 liters and the Cadillac DPi-V.R being reduced by 1 liter. The Nissan-Onroak DPi, meanwhile, has an adjusted Lambda, while the Mazda RT-24P was mandated to run its high downforce rear wing package instead of “2019 Opt. 1” that was outlined in the initial pre-testing BoP. In GT Le Mans, the BMW M8 GTE received a 2-liter fuel capacity increase, while an adjustment was made to the Ferrari 488 GTE’s RPM redline. The GT Daytona class saw the Lamborghini Huracan GT3 Evo get a 1 mm larger air restrictor, along with a related 2-liter increase in fuel capacity, while the BMW M6 GT3 received a 15 kg weight break. Fuel capacities were also adjusted for the new-for-2019 Porsche 911 GT3 R (+3 liters) and Acura NSX GT3 Evo (−3 liters), while IMSA elected to not slow down the GTD Class.

== Practice ==
Four practice sessions were held before the start of the race on Saturday, three on Thursday and one on Friday. The first two sessions on Thursday morning and afternoon were 45 minutes and 75 Minutes in length, while third held later that evening ran for 90 minutes, and the fourth on Friday morning lasted an hour.

In Practice 1, which was held in damp conditions, Felipe Nasr set the fastest lap, in the #31 Whelen Engineering Cadillac DPi-V.R, with a best of 1:36.108, in a session which saw just four of the eleven DPi cars set flying laps on slick tires during the damp session. Behind Nasr was Filipe Albuquerque, who gave the Action Express Racing a 1–2, in the #5 Mustang Sampling Cadillac, with a best of 1:36.707. Tristan Vautier's 1:37.595 effort in the No. 85 JDC-Miller Motorsports Cadillac and Jonathan Bomarito’s 1:38.561 in the No. 55 Mazda RT-24P were the only other competitive times set on Thursday morning. The 5th best time, and the top time in the GTLM class was set by Frederic Makowiecki, in the #911 Porsche 911 RSR on slick Michelins putting a gap of eight-tenths over Mathieu Jaminet in the German manufacturer's No. 912 car, whilst Joey Hand moved Ford Chip Ganassi Racing up to third late on, although his final effort was over a second off the Porsche pace up front. In GTD, Corey Lewis ended the morning quickest with a 1:46.577 in the #48 Paul Miller Racing Lamborghini Huracan GT3 Evo. This lap came during the 15-minute extension of the event's first practice session dedicated to silver and bronze drivers in the secondary GT class. Henrik Hedman topped the charts in LMP2 for DragonSpeed with a 1:46.657 in the team's FIA World Endurance Championship Oreca 07 Gibson.

In Practice 2, Jonathan Bomarito, driving the #55 Mazda RT24-P, setting a 1:34.672, was a full 0.711 seconds faster than second place Filipe Albuquerque in the No. 5 Mustang Sampling Racing Cadillac DPi-V.R. Colin Braun checked in with the third fastest time, set early in the session, in the #54 CORE Autosport Nissan Onroak DPi, while Ricky Taylor and Agustin Canapino completed the top five for Acura Team Penske and Juncos Racing, respectively. In LMP2, a late effort from James Allen put the No. 81 DragonSpeed Oreca 07 Gibson at the head of the four-car class by 0.257 seconds over Gabriel Aubry in the No. 52 from PR1/Mathiasen, with a 1:37.255. In GTLM, Nick Tandy was quickest in the GT Le Mans class in the #911 Porsche 911 RSR, with him setting a 1:43.475, followed by the #3 Corvette C7.R of Jan Magnussen with a 1:43.561, and the #67 Ford Chip Ganassi Racing Ford GT of Ryan Briscoe 1:43.755. Daniel Serra turned in the fastest lap in GTD, in the #51 Spirit of Race Ferrari 488 GT3 with a 1:45.936, while Trent Hindman and Ben Keating completed the top three in class for Meyer Shank Racing and Mercedes-AMG Team Riley Motorsports, setting a 1:46.184 and 1:46.244 respectively.

In Practice 3, which was held at night, Loic Duval put the #54 CORE Autosport Nissan DPi at the top, with a 1:34.786, while a 1:34.905 was set by Filipe Albuquerque in the #5 Action Express Racing Cadillac DPi-V.R. None of the Mazda RT24-P prototypes turned laps in Thursday evening practice after the Joest Racing team elected to carry out separate planned engine changes. In LMP2, Ben Hanley led the class, with a 1:36.521 in the #81 Dragonspeed Oreca 07. In GTLM, Augusto Farfus set the fastest lap, with a 1:43.315, just 0.002 seconds ahead of the 2nd placed #911 Porsche 911 RSR. In GTD, Bill Auberlen posted a 1:45.165 to put his #96 Turner Motorsport BMW M6 GT3 in the lead, with Daniel Serra coming in 2nd in the #51 Spirit of Race Ferrari 488 GT3, 0.109 seconds behind.

== Qualifying ==
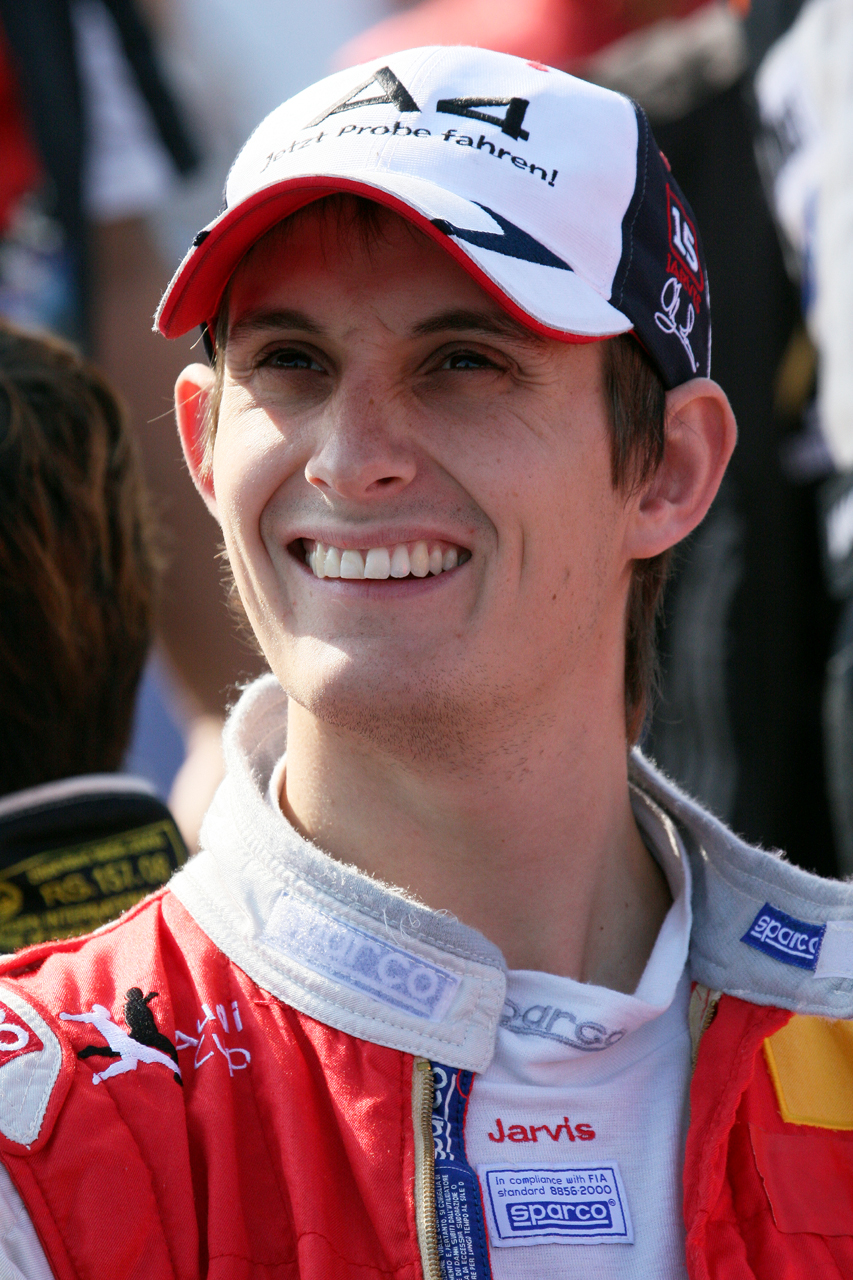
Oliver Jarvis, pictured here in 2009, secured pole position for Mazda Team Joest, and broke the Track Record in the process

On Thursday's Qualifying session, which was divided into 3, with one session for the Prototypes, GTLM and GTD classes, which lasted for 15 minutes each, and a ten minute interval between the sessions. The rules dictated that all teams nominated a driver to qualify their cars, with the Pro-Am (LMP2/GTD) classes requiring a Bronze/Silver Rated Driver to qualify the car. The competitors' fastest lap times determined the starting order. IMSA then arranged the grid such that the Prototype and GTLM cars began ahead of the GTD field.

In the Prototype Qualifying session, Oliver Jarvis, driving for Mazda Team Joest, broke the Daytona International Speedway Road Course lap record to clinch pole position for the race, bringing the #77 Mazda RT-24P to the top of the timing screens early in the 15-minute prototype qualifying session before shaving his best effort down to a 1:33.685. This was two tenths quicker than the previous record around the road course of the Daytona International Speedway, that had remained unbeaten for over 25 years, and had been set by P. J. Jones in 1993 behind the wheel of a GTP Toyota Eagle MkIII. This pole position was the first ever for Mazda Team Joest, and the Mazda RT24-P. He was joined on the front row of the grid by Ricky Taylor in the #7 Acura Team Penske ARX-05, who interrupted a Joest 1–2 held by Jarvis and Jonathan Bomarito, until his Penske team-mate Juan Pablo Montoya jumped up to third shortly before the checkered flag. Bomarito's time of 1:34.212 however, held out as the fourth-best, while Felipe Nasr brought the highest-placed Cadillac DPi-V.R to fifth on the grid. He was followed by another 4 more Cadillacs, with Jordan Taylor going sixth in the #10 Wayne Taylor Racing car, ahead of Juncos Racing's Agustin Canapino, and the JDC-Miller Motorsports cars driven by Tristan Vautier and Stephen Simpson, while Jon Bennett propped up the running DPi field in the CORE Autosport run Ligier Nissan DPi. The defending race winning #5 Mustang Sampling Cadillac DPi-V.R failed to post a time during the session, after Filipe Albuquerque radioed his crew about engine problems.

In LMP2, James Allen took pole in the #81 DragonSpeed Oreca 07 Gibson, recording a time which was half a second quicker than the 2nd placed #52 PR1/Mathiasen Motorsports Oreca 07 driven by Gabriel Aubry.

In GTLM, Nick Tandy set a new qualifying track record for the class, taking pole position for the Porsche GT Team, driving the #911 Porsche 911 RSR, with his best lap of 1:42.257 being a full 0.326 seconds faster than the effort by the previous year's GTLM pole sitter Jan Magnussen in the #3 Corvette Racing Corvette C7.R. Ryan Briscoe in the #67 Ford Chip Ganassi Racing team Ford GT finished 3rd, to bring three different manufacturers into the top 3 starting spots for the . Davide Rigon came in fourth fastest in the No. 62 Risi Competizione Ferrari 488 GTE, and was followed by Earl Bamber in the sister car to the #911, the #912. It was a tight qualifying session for the class, with all nine cars being covered by 0.982 seconds, and with the top four qualifiers in the class posting times under the previous class track record.

In GTD, Marcos Gomes set a track record for the class, while en route to taking the class pole position in the #13 Via Italia Racing Ferrari 488 GT3. The Brazilian broke Daniel Serra’s previous class qualifying record which had been set the previous year, while marking the third straight year that a Ferrari has taken the GTD class pole. Gomes’ best lap of 1:45.257 was 0.067 seconds faster than that of the second placed #33 Mercedes-AMG Team Riley Motorsports Mercedes-AMG GT3, driven by Ben Keating. Trent Hindman came third in the #86 Acura NSX GT3 Evo for Meyer Shank Racing. Lamborghini then took the next two spots on the grid with Giacomo Altoe and Rolf Ineichen for Ebimotors and GRT Grasser Racing Team, respectively. The top 13 cars in the GTD class were covered by less than one second, making for a closely packed qualifying session.

=== Qualifying results ===
Pole positions in each class are indicated in bold and by ‡.

Pos.	Class	No.	Entry	Driver	Time	Gap	Grid
1	**DPi**	**77**	**(Germany) Mazda Team Joest**	**(United Kingdom) Oliver Jarvis**	**1:33.685**	—	1‡
2	DPi	7	(United States) Acura Team Penske	(United States) Ricky Taylor	1:33.873	+0.188	2
3	DPi	6	(United States) Acura Team Penske	(Colombia) Juan Pablo Montoya	1:34.095	+0.410	3
4	DPi	55	(Germany) Mazda Team Joest	(United States) Jonathan Bomarito	1:34.212	+0.527	4
5	DPi	31	(United States) Whelen Engineering Racing	(Brazil) Felipe Nasr	1:34.433	+0.748	5
6	DPi	10	(United States) Konica Minolta Cadillac	(United States) Jordan Taylor	1:34.479	+0.794	6
7	DPi	50	(Argentina) Juncos Racing	(Argentina) Agustín Canapino	1:34.679	+0.994	7
8	DPi	85	(United States) JDC-Miller MotorSports	(France) Tristan Vautier	1:35.369	+1.684	8
9	DPi	84	(United States) JDC-Miller MotorSports	(South Africa) Stephen Simpson	1:35.442	+1.757	9
10	**LMP2**	**81**	**(United States) DragonSpeed**	**(Australia) James Allen**	**1:35.904**	**+2.219**	12‡
11	LMP2	52	(United States) PR1/Mathiasen Motorsports	(France) Gabriel Aubry	1:36.427	+2.742	13
12	DPi	54	(United States) CORE Autosport	(United States) Jon Bennett	1:36.686	+3.001	`10
13	LMP2	18	(United States) DragonSpeed	(Mexico) Roberto González	1:37.377	+3.692	14
14	LMP2	38	(United States) Performance Tech Motorsports	(United States) Kyle Masson	1:38.121	+4.436	15
15	**GTLM**	**911**	**(United States) Porsche GT Team**	**(United Kingdom) Nick Tandy**	**1:42.257**	**+8.572**	16‡
16	GTLM	3	(United States) Corvette Racing	(Denmark) Jan Magnussen	1:42.583	+8.898	17
17	GTLM	67	(United States) Ford Chip Ganassi Racing	(Australia) Ryan Briscoe	1:42.634	+8.949	18
18	GTLM	62	(United States) Risi Competizione	(Italy) Davide Rigon	1:42.712	+9.027	19
19	GTLM	912	(United States) Porsche GT Team	(New Zealand) Earl Bamber	1:42.796	+9.111	20
20	GTLM	66	(United States) Ford Chip Ganassi Racing	(United States) Joey Hand	1:42.920	+9.235	21
21	GTLM	24	(United States) BMW Team RLL	(United States) John Edwards	1:42.953	+9.268	22
22	GTLM	25	(United States) BMW Team RLL	(United States) Connor De Phillippi	1:42.986	+9.301	23
23	GTLM	4	(United States) Corvette Racing	(United Kingdom) Oliver Gavin	1:43.239	+9.554	24
24	**GTD**	**13**	**(Brazil) Via Italia Racing**	**(Brazil) Marcos Gomes**	**1:45.257**	**+11.572**	25‡
25	GTD	33	(United States) Mercedes-AMG Team Riley Motorsports	(United States) Ben Keating	1:45.324	+11.639	26
26	GTD	86	(United States) Meyer Shank Racing w/Curb-Agajanian	(United States) Trent Hindman	1:45.396	+11.711	27
27	GTD	46	(Italy) Ebimotors	(Italy) Giacomo Altoè	1:45.475	+11.790	28
28	GTD	11	(Austria) GRT Grasser Racing Team	(Switzerland) Rolf Ineichen	1:45.816	+12.131	29
29	GTD	51	(Switzerland) Spirit of Race	(Austria) Mathias Lauda	1:45.852	+12.167	30
30	GTD	44	(United States) Magnus Racing	(United States) Spencer Pumpelly	1:45.855	+12.170	31
31	GTD	9	(Canada) Pfaff Motorsports	(Germany) Lars Kern	1:45.945	+12.260	32
32	GTD	48	(United States) Paul Miller Racing	(United States) Corey Lewis	1:46.040	+12.355	47^{1}
33	GTD	73	(United States) Park Place Motorsports	(United States) Patrick Lindsey	1:46.103	+12.418	33
34	GTD	57	(United States) Heinricher Racing w/Meyer Shank Racing	(Brazil) Ana Beatriz	1:46.116	+12.431	34
35	GTD	14	(Canada) AIM Vasser Sullivan	(United States) Richard Heistand	1:46.214	+12.529	35
36	GTD	540	(United States) Black Swan Racing	(Germany) Marco Seefried	1:46.231	+12.546	36
37	GTD	12	(Canada) AIM Vasser Sullivan	(United States) Frankie Montecalvo	1:46.270	+12.585	37
38	GTD	29	(Germany) Montaplast by Land-Motorsport	(Canada) Daniel Morad	1:46.309	+12.624	38
39	GTD	63	(United States) Scuderia Corsa	(United States) Cooper MacNeil	1:46.321	+12.636	39
40	GTD	99	(Germany) NGT Motorsport	(Germany) Alfred Renauer	1:46.669	+12.984	40
41	GTD	8	(United States) Starworks Motorsport	(Argentina) Ezequiel Pérez Companc	1:46.710	+13.025	41
42	GTD	19	(United States) Moorespeed	(United States) Andrew Davis	1:46.781	+13.096	42
43	GTD	88	(Belgium) WRT Speedstar Audi Sport	(United Kingdom) Ian James	1:47.368	+13.683	43
44	GTD	71	(United States) P1 Motorsports	(Colombia) JC Perez	1:47.447	+13.762	46^{2}
45	GTD	47	(United States) Precision Performance Motorsports	(United States) Don Yount	1:47.809	+14.124	44
46	DPi	5	(United States) Mustang Sampling Racing	did not participate			11
47	GTD	96	(United States) Turner Motorsport^{3}	did not participate			45

=== Notes ===
^1 – The #48 Paul Miller Racing entry was moved to the back of the GTD field as per Articles 40.1.4. and 43.5 of the Sporting regulations (Change of qualifying tires) and (Change of starting driver).

^2 – The #71 P1 Motorsports entry was moved to the back of the GTD field as per Article 40.1.4. of the Sporting regulations (Change of qualifying tires).

^3 – The #96 Turner Motorsports car had all its qualifying times forfeited as per Article 40.2.9. of the Sporting regulations (car was touched by the crew during qualifying without permission by the officials).

== Race report ==
After the green flag dropped on Saturday, Acura Team Penske held the advantage thanks to a strong performance from Juan Pablo Montoya, who passed Oliver Jarvis in the #77 Mazda RT24-P 30 minutes into the race. Though running strong, the Acura and Mazda cars faced pressure from the Action Express Racing Cadillacs in 5th and 6th two hours in. Kyle Masson and the #38 Performance Tech Motorsports team led the LMP2 class in their Oreca. In GTLM, Porsche and Ford's early challenge suffered teething troubles, after a splitter issue had put the #912 Porsche 911 RSR a lap behind class leader, and a three lap loss due to mechanical failure for the #67 Ford GT. Regardless, the sister car of the former manufacturer, #911, held the lead in the opening hour. In the GTD class, the #86 Meyer Shank Racing Acura NSX assumed a lead over the #33 Riley Motorsports Mercedes in 2nd, and the GRT Grasser Racing Lamborghini Huracan in 3rd.

After a Full-Course Yellow, which was triggered from an engine explosion from the #99 NGT Motorsport Porsche 911 GT3, the standings in DPi shuffled, with Dane Cameron holding a small lead over Felipe Nasr in the #31 Whelen Engineering Cadillac. Behind them were both Mazdas, continuing to put pressure on the leaders. A similar shuffle occurred in GTLM, with the #66 Ford GT of Chip Ganassi Racing emerging the leader ahead of the #4 Corvette Racing C7.R in second and #911 Porsche RSR in third. In the GTD class, Rik Breukers of the #11 GRT Grasser Racing Team emerged the leader, but was handed a four-minute pitlane penalty for ignoring full course caution procedures. James Allen led a 1-2 for the DragonSpeed team in the LMP2 class.

The defending overall winning team, the #5 Mustang Sampling Racing Cadillac had suffered a major blow to their challenge when, in the 3rd hour, an electrical issue had seen them initially out of the race. After 25 minutes in the garage, the #5 car returned to the track. The #6 Acura ARX-05 in the hands of Dane Cameron continued to lead in the DPi class, with the sister car in 3rd in the hands of Hélio Castroneves. Mazda driver René Rast set in between them in second, posing a challenge to Cameron's lead.

As evening fell, two-time Formula One World Driver's Champion Fernando Alonso began his first stint in the #10 Wayne Taylor Racing Cadillac. He muscled his way into the overall lead of the Rolex 24, after inheriting the car from Jordan Taylor in 7th position. Alonso took the lead from Rene Rast in the #77 Mazda. After a third Full-Course Yellow flag, Alonso maintained his overall lead, and handed the car over to Toyota Gazoo Racing team-mate Kamui Kobayashi with a 15-second advantage over the #77.

The #52 PR1/Mathiasen Motorsports Oreca 07 collided with the #85 Cadillac DPi-V.R. of JDC-Miller Motorsports, thus triggering a fourth Full-Course Yellow just before the 6-hour-mark of the race. Action Express Racing debutante Pipo Derani elected not to go to the pits when all other cars in the DPi class had, thus putting the #31 Cadillac in the lead. Prior to this, Kamui Kobayashi in the #10 Cadillac set the fastest lap of the race up to that point. In the GTLM class, Porsche GT Team driver Nick Tandy lost two places from pit stops after holding the lead, thus promoting the #4 Corvette C7.R to the lead, and the #62 Ferrari 488 GTE of Risi Competizione to an impressive second. The #33 Mercedes-AMG GT3 of Riley Motorsports held the lead in the GTD class, while DragonSpeed continued to be first and second in LMP2.

=== Post-race ===
Since it was the season's first race Jordan Taylor, Renger van der Zande, Fernando Alonso, and Kamui Kobayashi led the DPi Drivers' Championship with 35 points each. Derani, Curran and Nasr were in second with 32 points. Helio Castroneves, Ricky Taylor, and Alexander Rossi were third with 30 points. Saavedra, Maldonado, Cullen, and González led the LMP2 points standings, ahead of Kyle Masson, Robert Masson, Kris Wright, and Cameron Cassels. De Phillippi, Eng, Herta, and Farfus led the GTLM Drivers' Championship with 35 points. Calado, Pier Guidi, Molina, and Rigon were second with 32 points. Bamber, Vanthoor, and Jaminet were third with 30 points. Bortolotti, Breukers, Ineichen, and Engelhart led the GTD Drivers' Championship, followed by the second-placed Montecalvo, Bell, Segal, and Telitz. Vervisch, van der Linde, James, and De Angelis were third. Konica Minolta Cadillac, DragonSpeed, BMW Team RLL, and GRT Grasser Racing Team became the leaders of their respective class Teams' Championships. Cadillac, BMW, and Lamborghini assumed the lead of their respective Manufacturers' Championships with 11 races left in the season.

== Results ==
Class winners are denoted in bold and ‡.

Pos	Class	No.	Team / Entrant	Drivers	Chassis	Laps	Time/Retired
Pos	Class	No.	Team / Entrant	Drivers	Engine	Laps	Time/Retired
1	**DPi**	**10**	**(United States) Konica Minolta Cadillac**	**(Netherlands) Renger van der Zande (United States) Jordan Taylor (Spain) Fernando Alonso (Japan) Kamui Kobayashi**	**Cadillac DPi-V.R**	**593**	**21:59:13.350‡**
1	**DPi**	**10**	**(United States) Konica Minolta Cadillac**	**(Netherlands) Renger van der Zande (United States) Jordan Taylor (Spain) Fernando Alonso (Japan) Kamui Kobayashi**	**Cadillac 5.5 L V8**	**593**	**21:59:13.350‡**
2	DPi	31	(United States) Whelen Engineering Racing	(Brazil) Felipe Nasr (United States) Eric Curran (Brazil) Pipo Derani	Cadillac DPi-V.R	593	+13.458
2	DPi	31	(United States) Whelen Engineering Racing	(Brazil) Felipe Nasr (United States) Eric Curran (Brazil) Pipo Derani	Cadillac 5.5 L V8	593	+13.458
3	DPi	7	(United States) Acura Team Penske	(Brazil) Hélio Castroneves (United States) Alexander Rossi (United States) Ricky Taylor	Acura ARX-05	593	+13.964
3	DPi	7	(United States) Acura Team Penske	(Brazil) Hélio Castroneves (United States) Alexander Rossi (United States) Ricky Taylor	Acura AR35TT 3.5 L Turbo V6	593	+13.964
4	DPi	54	(United States) CORE Autosport	(United States) Jon Bennett (United States) Colin Braun (France) Romain Dumas (France) Loïc Duval	Nissan DPi	589	+4 Laps
4	DPi	54	(United States) CORE Autosport	(United States) Jon Bennett (United States) Colin Braun (France) Romain Dumas (France) Loïc Duval	Nissan VR38DETT 3.8 L Turbo V6	589	+4 Laps
5	DPi	85	(United States) JDC-Miller MotorSports	(Canada) Misha Goikhberg (France) Tristan Vautier (Canada) Devlin DeFrancesco (Brazil) Rubens Barrichello	Cadillac DPi-V.R	586	+7 laps
5	DPi	85	(United States) JDC-Miller MotorSports	(Canada) Misha Goikhberg (France) Tristan Vautier (Canada) Devlin DeFrancesco (Brazil) Rubens Barrichello	Cadillac 5.5 L V8	586	+7 laps
6	**LMP2**	**18**	**(United States) DragonSpeed**	**(Mexico) Roberto González** **(Venezuela) Pastor Maldonado** **(Colombia) Sebastián Saavedra** **(Republic of Ireland) Ryan Cullen**	**Oreca 07**	**582**	**+11 Laps‡**
6	**LMP2**	**18**	**(United States) DragonSpeed**	**(Mexico) Roberto González** **(Venezuela) Pastor Maldonado** **(Colombia) Sebastián Saavedra** **(Republic of Ireland) Ryan Cullen**	**Gibson GK428 4.2 L V8**	**582**	**+11 Laps‡**
7	LMP2	38	(United States) Performance Tech Motorsports	(United States) Kyle Masson (United States) Robert Masson (United States) Kris Wright (Canada) Cameron Cassels	Oreca 07	578	+15 Laps
7	LMP2	38	(United States) Performance Tech Motorsports	(United States) Kyle Masson (United States) Robert Masson (United States) Kris Wright (Canada) Cameron Cassels	Gibson GK428 4.2 L V8	578	+15 Laps
8	DPi	6	(United States) Acura Team Penske	(United States) Dane Cameron (Colombia) Juan Pablo Montoya (France) Simon Pagenaud	Acura ARX-05	576	+17 Laps
8	DPi	6	(United States) Acura Team Penske	(United States) Dane Cameron (Colombia) Juan Pablo Montoya (France) Simon Pagenaud	Acura AR35TT 3.5 L Turbo V6	576	+17 Laps
9	DPi	5	(United States) Mustang Sampling Racing	(Portugal) Filipe Albuquerque (Portugal) João Barbosa (Brazil) Christian Fittipaldi	Cadillac DPi-V.R	573	+20 laps
9	DPi	5	(United States) Mustang Sampling Racing	(Portugal) Filipe Albuquerque (Portugal) João Barbosa (Brazil) Christian Fittipaldi	Cadillac 5.5 L V8	573	+20 laps
10	**GTLM**	**25**	**(United States) BMW Team RLL**	**(Brazil) Augusto Farfus** **(United States) Connor De Phillippi** **(Austria) Phillipp Eng** **(United States) Colton Herta**	**BMW M8 GTE**	**571**	**+22 Laps‡**
10	**GTLM**	**25**	**(United States) BMW Team RLL**	**(Brazil) Augusto Farfus** **(United States) Connor De Phillippi** **(Austria) Phillipp Eng** **(United States) Colton Herta**	**BMW S63 4.0 L Twin-turbo V8**	**571**	**+22 Laps‡**
11	GTLM	62	(United States) Risi Competizione	(United Kingdom) James Calado (Italy) Alessandro Pier Guidi (Spain) Miguel Molina (Italy) Davide Rigon	Ferrari 488 GTE	571	+22 Laps
11	GTLM	62	(United States) Risi Competizione	(United Kingdom) James Calado (Italy) Alessandro Pier Guidi (Spain) Miguel Molina (Italy) Davide Rigon	Ferrari F154CB 3.9 L Turbo V8	571	+22 Laps
12	GTLM	912	(United States) Porsche GT Team	(New Zealand) Earl Bamber (France) Mathieu Jaminet (Belgium) Laurens Vanthoor	Porsche 911 RSR	570	+23 Laps
12	GTLM	912	(United States) Porsche GT Team	(New Zealand) Earl Bamber (France) Mathieu Jaminet (Belgium) Laurens Vanthoor	Porsche 4.0 L Flat-6	570	+23 Laps
13	GTLM	67	(United States) Ford Chip Ganassi Racing^{1}	(Australia) Ryan Briscoe (New Zealand) Scott Dixon (United Kingdom) Richard Westbrook	Ford GT	570	+23 Laps
13	GTLM	67	(United States) Ford Chip Ganassi Racing^{1}	(Australia) Ryan Briscoe (New Zealand) Scott Dixon (United Kingdom) Richard Westbrook	Ford EcoBoost 3.5 L Turbo V6	570	+23 Laps
14	GTLM	911	(United States) Porsche GT Team	(France) Frédéric Makowiecki (France) Patrick Pilet (United Kingdom) Nick Tandy	Porsche 911 RSR	569	+24 Laps
14	GTLM	911	(United States) Porsche GT Team	(France) Frédéric Makowiecki (France) Patrick Pilet (United Kingdom) Nick Tandy	Porsche 4.0 L Flat-6	569	+24 Laps
15 DNF	LMP2	81	(United States) DragonSpeed	(Sweden) Henrik Hedman (United Kingdom) Ben Hanley (France) Nicolas Lapierre (Australia) James Allen	Oreca 07	567	Wheel
15 DNF	LMP2	81	(United States) DragonSpeed	(Sweden) Henrik Hedman (United Kingdom) Ben Hanley (France) Nicolas Lapierre (Australia) James Allen	Gibson GK428 4.2 L V8	567	Wheel
16	GTLM	3	(United States) Corvette Racing	(Spain) Antonio García (Denmark) Jan Magnussen (Germany) Mike Rockenfeller	Chevrolet Corvette C7.R	563	+30 Laps
16	GTLM	3	(United States) Corvette Racing	(Spain) Antonio García (Denmark) Jan Magnussen (Germany) Mike Rockenfeller	Chevrolet LT5.5 5.5 L V8	563	+30 Laps
17	**GTD**	**11**	**(Austria) GRT Grasser Racing Team**	**(Italy) Mirko Bortolotti** **(Netherlands) Rik Breukers** **(Germany) Christian Engelhart** **(Switzerland) Rolf Ineichen**	**Lamborghini Huracán GT3 Evo**	**561**	**+32 Laps‡**
17	**GTD**	**11**	**(Austria) GRT Grasser Racing Team**	**(Italy) Mirko Bortolotti** **(Netherlands) Rik Breukers** **(Germany) Christian Engelhart** **(Switzerland) Rolf Ineichen**	**Lamborghini 5.2 L V10**	**561**	**+32 Laps‡**
18	GTD	12	(Canada) AIM Vasser Sullivan	(United States) Frankie Montecalvo (United States) Townsend Bell (United States) Aaron Telitz (United States) Jeff Segal	Lexus RC F GT3	561	+32 Laps
18	GTD	12	(Canada) AIM Vasser Sullivan	(United States) Frankie Montecalvo (United States) Townsend Bell (United States) Aaron Telitz (United States) Jeff Segal	Lexus 5.0 L V8	561	+32 Laps
19	GTD	88	(Belgium) WRT Speedstar Audi Sport	(Belgium) Frédéric Vervisch (South Africa) Kelvin van der Linde (United States) Ian James (Canada) Roman De Angelis	Audi R8 LMS Evo	561	+32 Laps
19	GTD	88	(Belgium) WRT Speedstar Audi Sport	(Belgium) Frédéric Vervisch (South Africa) Kelvin van der Linde (United States) Ian James (Canada) Roman De Angelis	Audi 5.2 L V10	561	+32 Laps
20	GTD	86	(United States) Meyer Shank Racing with Curb-Agajanian	(Germany) Mario Farnbacher (United States) Trent Hindman (United States) Justin Marks (United States) A. J. Allmendinger	Acura NSX GT3 Evo	561	+32 Laps
20	GTD	86	(United States) Meyer Shank Racing with Curb-Agajanian	(Germany) Mario Farnbacher (United States) Trent Hindman (United States) Justin Marks (United States) A. J. Allmendinger	Acura 3.5 L Turbo V6	561	+32 Laps
21	GTD	14	(Canada) AIM Vasser Sullivan	(United States) Richard Heistand (United Kingdom) Jack Hawksworth (United States) Austin Cindric (New Zealand) Nick Cassidy	Lexus RC F GT3	560	+33 Laps
21	GTD	14	(Canada) AIM Vasser Sullivan	(United States) Richard Heistand (United Kingdom) Jack Hawksworth (United States) Austin Cindric (New Zealand) Nick Cassidy	Lexus 5.0 L V8	560	+33 Laps
22	GTD	33	(United States) Mercedes-AMG Team Riley Motorsports	(Netherlands) Jeroen Bleekemolen (Brazil) Felipe Fraga (United States) Ben Keating (Germany) Luca Stolz	Mercedes-AMG GT3	560	+33 Laps
22	GTD	33	(United States) Mercedes-AMG Team Riley Motorsports	(Netherlands) Jeroen Bleekemolen (Brazil) Felipe Fraga (United States) Ben Keating (Germany) Luca Stolz	Mercedes-AMG M159 6.2 L V8	560	+33 Laps
23	GTD	73	(United States) Park Place Motorsports	(United States) Patrick Long (United States) Patrick Lindsey (Australia) Matt Campbell (United States) Nick Boulle	Porsche 911 GT3 R	560	+33 Laps
23	GTD	73	(United States) Park Place Motorsports	(United States) Patrick Long (United States) Patrick Lindsey (Australia) Matt Campbell (United States) Nick Boulle	Porsche 4.0 L Flat-6	560	+33 Laps
24	GTD	13	(Brazil) Via Italia Racing	(Brazil) Chico Longo (Brazil) Victor Franzoni (Brazil) Marcos Gomes (Italy) Andrea Bertolini	Ferrari 488 GT3	560	+33 Laps
24	GTD	13	(Brazil) Via Italia Racing	(Brazil) Chico Longo (Brazil) Victor Franzoni (Brazil) Marcos Gomes (Italy) Andrea Bertolini	Ferrari F154CB 3.9 L Turbo V8	560	+33 Laps
25	GTD	96	(United States) Turner Motorsport	(United States) Bill Auberlen (United States) Robby Foley (United States) Dillon Machavern (Germany) Jens Klingmann	BMW M6 GT3	560	+33 Laps
25	GTD	96	(United States) Turner Motorsport	(United States) Bill Auberlen (United States) Robby Foley (United States) Dillon Machavern (Germany) Jens Klingmann	BMW 4.4 L Turbo V8	560	+33 Laps
26	GTD	44	(United States) Magnus Racing	(United States) Andy Lally (Italy) Marco Mapelli (United States) Spencer Pumpelly (United States) John Potter	Lamborghini Huracán GT3 Evo	559	+34 Laps
26	GTD	44	(United States) Magnus Racing	(United States) Andy Lally (Italy) Marco Mapelli (United States) Spencer Pumpelly (United States) John Potter	Lamborghini 5.2 L V10	559	+34 Laps
27	GTLM	66	(United States) Ford Chip Ganassi Racing	(France) Sébastien Bourdais (United States) Joey Hand (Germany) Dirk Müller	Ford GT	559	+34 Laps
27	GTLM	66	(United States) Ford Chip Ganassi Racing	(France) Sébastien Bourdais (United States) Joey Hand (Germany) Dirk Müller	Ford EcoBoost 3.5 L Turbo V6	559	+34 Laps
28	GTLM	4	(United States) Corvette Racing	(Switzerland) Marcel Fässler (United Kingdom) Oliver Gavin (United States) Tommy Milner	Chevrolet Corvette C7.R	555	+38 Laps
28	GTLM	4	(United States) Corvette Racing	(Switzerland) Marcel Fässler (United Kingdom) Oliver Gavin (United States) Tommy Milner	Chevrolet LT5.5 5.5 L V8	555	+38 Laps
29	DPi	50	(Argentina) Juncos Racing	(United States) Will Owen (Austria) René Binder (Argentina) Agustín Canapino (United States) Kyle Kaiser	Cadillac DPi-V.R	555	+38 Laps
29	DPi	50	(Argentina) Juncos Racing	(United States) Will Owen (Austria) René Binder (Argentina) Agustín Canapino (United States) Kyle Kaiser	Cadillac 5.5 L V8	555	+38 Laps
30	GTD	19	(United States) Moorespeed	(United States) Andrew Davis (Spain) Alex Riberas (United States) Will Hardeman (Germany) Markus Winkelhock	Audi R8 LMS Evo	555	+38 Laps
30	GTD	19	(United States) Moorespeed	(United States) Andrew Davis (Spain) Alex Riberas (United States) Will Hardeman (Germany) Markus Winkelhock	Audi 5.2 L V10	555	+38 Laps
31	GTLM	24	(United States) BMW Team RLL	(United States) John Edwards (Australia) Chaz Mostert (Italy) Alex Zanardi (Finland) Jesse Krohn	BMW M8 GTE	553	+40 Laps
31	GTLM	24	(United States) BMW Team RLL	(United States) John Edwards (Australia) Chaz Mostert (Italy) Alex Zanardi (Finland) Jesse Krohn	BMW S63 4.0 L Twin-turbo V8	553	+40 Laps
32	GTD	57	(United States) Heinricher Racing w/Meyer Shank Racing	(Switzerland) Simona de Silvestro (United Kingdom) Katherine Legge (Denmark) Christina Nielsen (Brazil) Bia Figueiredo	Acura NSX GT3 Evo	550	+43 Laps
32	GTD	57	(United States) Heinricher Racing w/Meyer Shank Racing	(Switzerland) Simona de Silvestro (United Kingdom) Katherine Legge (Denmark) Christina Nielsen (Brazil) Bia Figueiredo	Acura 3.5 L Turbo V6	550	+43 Laps
33	GTD	8	(United States) Starworks Motorsport	(United Kingdom) Ryan Dalziel (United States) Parker Chase (Argentina) Ezequiel Perez Companc (Germany) Christopher Haase	Audi R8 LMS Evo	547	+46 Laps
33	GTD	8	(United States) Starworks Motorsport	(United Kingdom) Ryan Dalziel (United States) Parker Chase (Argentina) Ezequiel Perez Companc (Germany) Christopher Haase	Audi 5.2 L V10	547	+46 Laps
34	GTD	540	(United States) Black Swan Racing	(Germany) Marco Seefried (United States) Tim Pappas (Germany) Dirk Werner (Italy) Matteo Cairoli	Porsche 911 GT3 R	545	+ 48 Laps
34	GTD	540	(United States) Black Swan Racing	(Germany) Marco Seefried (United States) Tim Pappas (Germany) Dirk Werner (Italy) Matteo Cairoli	Porsche 4.0 L Flat-6	545	+ 48 Laps
35	LMP2	52	(United States) PR1/ Mathiasen Motorsports	(United States) Matt McMurry (United States) Mark Kvamme (France) Enzo Guibbert (France) Gabriel Aubry	Oreca 07	512	+81 laps
35	LMP2	52	(United States) PR1/ Mathiasen Motorsports	(United States) Matt McMurry (United States) Mark Kvamme (France) Enzo Guibbert (France) Gabriel Aubry	Gibson GK428 4.2 L V8	512	+81 laps
36 DNF	GTD	48	(United States) Paul Miller Racing	(United States) Corey Lewis (United States) Bryan Sellers (Italy) Andrea Caldarelli (United States) Ryan Hardwick	Lamborghini Huracán GT3 Evo	491	crash
36 DNF	GTD	48	(United States) Paul Miller Racing	(United States) Corey Lewis (United States) Bryan Sellers (Italy) Andrea Caldarelli (United States) Ryan Hardwick	Lamborghini 5.2 L V10	491	crash
37 DNF	GTD	9	(Canada) Pfaff Motorsports	(Canada) Scott Hargrove (Germany) Lars Kern (Norway) Dennis Olsen (Canada) Zacharie Robichon	Porsche 911 GT3 R	470	crash
37 DNF	GTD	9	(Canada) Pfaff Motorsports	(Canada) Scott Hargrove (Germany) Lars Kern (Norway) Dennis Olsen (Canada) Zacharie Robichon	Porsche 4.0 L Flat-6	470	crash
38 DNF	GTD	46	(Italy) EBIMOTORS	(Italy) Fabio Babini (Italy) Emanuele Busnelli (United Kingdom) Taylor Proto (Italy) Giacomo Altoè	Lamborghini Huracán GT3 Evo	470	crash
38 DNF	GTD	46	(Italy) EBIMOTORS	(Italy) Fabio Babini (Italy) Emanuele Busnelli (United Kingdom) Taylor Proto (Italy) Giacomo Altoè	Lamborghini 5.2 L V10	470	crash
39	GTD	47	(United States) Precision Performance Motorsports	(United States) Don Yount (Serbia) Miloš Pavlović (United States) Steve Dunn (Sweden) Linus Lundqvist	Lamborghini Huracán GT3 Evo	442	+151 Laps
39	GTD	47	(United States) Precision Performance Motorsports	(United States) Don Yount (Serbia) Miloš Pavlović (United States) Steve Dunn (Sweden) Linus Lundqvist	Lamborghini 5.2 L V10	442	+151 Laps
40 DNF	DPi	55	(Germany) Mazda Team Joest	(United Kingdom) Harry Tincknell (France) Olivier Pla (United States) Jonathan Bomarito	Mazda RT24-P	440	suspension
40 DNF	DPi	55	(Germany) Mazda Team Joest	(United Kingdom) Harry Tincknell (France) Olivier Pla (United States) Jonathan Bomarito	Mazda MZ-2.0T 2.0 L Turbo I4	440	suspension
41 DNF	GTD	71	(United States) P1 Motorsports	(Germany) Fabian Schiller (Austria) Dominik Baumann (Germany) Maximilian Buhk (Colombia) JC Perez	Mercedes-AMG GT3	431	withdrawn
41 DNF	GTD	71	(United States) P1 Motorsports	(Germany) Fabian Schiller (Austria) Dominik Baumann (Germany) Maximilian Buhk (Colombia) JC Perez	Mercedes-AMG M159 6.2 L V8	431	withdrawn
42	GTD	51	(Switzerland) Spirit of Race	(Canada) Paul Dalla Lana (Portugal) Pedro Lamy (Austria) Mathias Lauda (Brazil) Daniel Serra	Ferrari 488 GT3	349	+ 244 Laps
42	GTD	51	(Switzerland) Spirit of Race	(Canada) Paul Dalla Lana (Portugal) Pedro Lamy (Austria) Mathias Lauda (Brazil) Daniel Serra	Ferrari F154CB 3.9 L Turbo V8	349	+ 244 Laps
43	DPi	84	(United States) JDC-Miller MotorSports	(Switzerland) Simon Trummer (Colombia) Juan Piedrahita (United States) Chris Miller (South Africa) Stephen Simpson	Cadillac DPi-V.R	225	+ 368 Laps
43	DPi	84	(United States) JDC-Miller MotorSports	(Switzerland) Simon Trummer (Colombia) Juan Piedrahita (United States) Chris Miller (South Africa) Stephen Simpson	Cadillac 5.5 L V8	225	+ 368 Laps
44 DNF	DPi	77	(Germany) Mazda Team Joest	(United Kingdom) Oliver Jarvis (United States) Tristan Nunez (Germany) René Rast (Germany) Timo Bernhard	Mazda RT24-P	220	fire
44 DNF	DPi	77	(Germany) Mazda Team Joest	(United Kingdom) Oliver Jarvis (United States) Tristan Nunez (Germany) René Rast (Germany) Timo Bernhard	Mazda MZ-2.0T 2.0 L Turbo I4	220	fire
45 DNF	GTD	99	(Germany) NGT Motorsport by Herberth	(Austria) Klaus Bachler (Germany) Sven Müller (Germany) Alfred Renauer (Germany) Jürgen Häring (Germany) Steffen Görig	Porsche 911 GT3 R	47	engine
45 DNF	GTD	99	(Germany) NGT Motorsport by Herberth	(Austria) Klaus Bachler (Germany) Sven Müller (Germany) Alfred Renauer (Germany) Jürgen Häring (Germany) Steffen Görig	Porsche 4.0 L Flat-6	47	engine
46	GTD	29	(Germany) Montaplast by Land-Motorsport^{2}	(Canada) Daniel Morad (Germany) Christopher Mies (Switzerland) Ricardo Feller (Belgium) Dries Vanthoor	Audi R8 LMS Evo	561	+32 Laps
46	GTD	29	(Germany) Montaplast by Land-Motorsport^{2}	(Canada) Daniel Morad (Germany) Christopher Mies (Switzerland) Ricardo Feller (Belgium) Dries Vanthoor	Audi 5.2 L V10	561	+32 Laps
47 DNF	GTD	63	(United States) Scuderia Corsa^{3}	(Finland) Toni Vilander (Germany) Dominik Farnbacher (United States) Cooper MacNeil (United States) Jeff Westphal	Ferrari 488 GT3	547	crash
47 DNF	GTD	63	(United States) Scuderia Corsa^{3}	(Finland) Toni Vilander (Germany) Dominik Farnbacher (United States) Cooper MacNeil (United States) Jeff Westphal	Ferrari F154 3.9 L Turbo V8	547	crash

=== Notes ===
^1 – The #67 Ford Chip Ganassi Racing car was assessed a 1 min 48 sec time penalty post race, for violating emergency fuel obligations.

^2 – The #29 Montaplast by Land-Motorsport Audi R8 LMS was moved to the back of the class per Article 12.12C for a drive time infringement.

^3 – The #63 Scuderia Corsa Ferrari 488 GT3 was moved to the back of the class per Article 12.12C for a drive time infringement.

== Standings after the race ==
DPi Drivers' Championship standings
Pos.	Driver	Points
1	(United States) Jordan Taylor (Netherlands) Renger van der Zande (Spain) Fernando Alonso (Japan) Kamui Kobayashi	35
2	(Brazil) Pipo Derani (Brazil) Felipe Nasr (United States) Eric Curran	32
3	(Brazil) Helio Castroneves (United States) Ricky Taylor (United States) Alexander Rossi	30
4	(United States) Colin Braun (United States) Jon Bennett (France) Romain Dumas (France) Loïc Duval	28
5	(Canada) Mikhail Goikhberg (France) Tristan Vautier (Brazil) Rubens Barrichello (Canada) Devlin DeFrancesco	26

LMP2 Drivers' Championship standings
Pos.	Driver	Points
1	(Colombia) Sebastián Saavedra (Venezuela) Pastor Maldonado (Republic of Ireland) Ryan Cullen (Mexico) Roberto González	35
2	(Canada) Cameron Cassels (United States) Robert Masson (United States) Kris Wright (United States) Kyle Masson	32
3	(Sweden) Henrik Hedman (United Kingdom) Ben Hanley (Australia) James Allen (France) Nicolas Lapierre	30
4	(United States) Matt McMurry (France) Gabriel Aubry (France) Enzo Guibbert (United States) Mark Kvamme	28

GTLM Drivers' Championship standings
Pos.	Driver	Points
1	(United States) Connor De Phillippi (Austria) Philipp Eng (United States) Colton Herta (Brazil) Augusto Farfus	35
2	(United Kingdom) James Calado (Italy) Alessandro Pier Guidi (Spain) Miguel Molina (Italy) Davide Rigon	32
3	(New Zealand) Earl Bamber (Belgium) Laurens Vanthoor (France) Mathieu Jaminet	30
4	(Australia) Ryan Briscoe (United Kingdom) Richard Westbrook (New Zealand) Scott Dixon	28
5	(France) Patrick Pilet (United Kingdom) Nick Tandy (France) Frédéric Makowiecki	26

GTD Drivers' Championship standings
Pos.	Driver	Points
1	(Italy) Mirko Bortolotti (Netherlands) Rik Breukers (Switzerland) Rolf Ineichen (Germany) Christian Engelhart	35
2	(United States) Frankie Montecalvo (United States) Townsend Bell (United States) Jeff Segal (United States) Aaron Telitz	32
3	(Belgium) Frédéric Vervisch (South Africa) Kelvin van der Linde (United Kingdom) Ian James (Canada) Roman De Angelis	30
4	(Germany) Mario Farnbacher (United States) Trent Hindman (United States) Justin Marks (United States) A. J. Allmendinger	28
5	(United States) Richard Heistand (United Kingdom) Jack Hawksworth (United States) Austin Cindric (New Zealand) Nick Cassidy	26

- Note: Only the top five positions are included for all sets of standings.

DPi Teams' Championship standings
Pos.	Team	Points
1	(United States) #10 Konica Minolta Cadillac	35
2	(United States) #31 Whelen Engineering Racing	32
3	(United States) #7 Acura Team Penske	30
4	(United States) #54 CORE Autosport	28
5	(United States) #85 JDC-Miller MotorSports	26

LMP2 Teams' Championship standings
Pos.	Team	Points
1	(United States) #18 DragonSpeed	35
2	(United States) #38 Performance Tech Motorsports	32
3	(United States) #81 DragonSpeed	30
4	(United States) #52 PR1/Mathiasen Motorsports	28

GTLM Teams' Championship standings
Pos.	Team	Points
1	(United States) #25 BMW Team RLL	35
2	(United States) #62 Risi Competizione	32
3	(United States) #912 Porsche GT Team	30
4	(United States) #67 Ford Chip Ganassi Racing	28
5	(United States) #911 Porsche GT Team	26

GTD Teams' Championship standings
Pos.	Team	Points
1	(Austria) #11 GRT Grasser Racing Team	35
2	(Canada) #12 AIM Vasser Sullivan	32
3	(Belgium) #88 WRT Speedstar Audi Sport	30
4	(United States) #86 Meyer-Shank Racing with Curb Agajanian	28
5	(Canada) #14 AIM Vasser Sullivan	26

- Note: Only the top five positions are included for all sets of standings.

DPi Manufacturers' Championship standings
Pos.	Manufacturer	Points
1	(United States) Cadillac	35
2	(Japan) Acura	32
3	(Japan) Nissan	30
4	(Japan) Mazda	28

GTLM Manufacturers' Championship standings
Pos.	Manufacturer	Points
1	(Germany) BMW	35
2	(Italy) Ferrari	32
3	(Germany) Porsche	30
4	(United States) Ford	28
5	(United States) Chevrolet	26

GTD Manufacturers' Championship standings
Pos.	Manufacturer	Points
1	(Italy) Lamborghini	35
2	(Japan) Lexus	32
3	(Germany) Audi	30
4	(Japan) Acura	28
5	(Germany) Mercedes-AMG	26

- Note: Only the top five positions are included for all sets of standings.

IMSA SportsCar Championship
Previous race: none	2019 season	Next race: 12 Hours of Sebring
