= Oakley, Bedfordshire =

Village in Bedfordshire, England

Coordinates: 52.171497°N 0.526605°W

Oakley
- Location within Bedfordshire
- Population: 2,438; 2493 (2011 Census)
- OS grid reference: TL007536
- Unitary authority: Bedford
- Ceremonial county: Bedfordshire
- Region: East
- Country: England
- Sovereign state: United Kingdom
- Post town: Bedford
- Postcode district: MK43
- Dialling code: 01234
- Police: Bedfordshire
- Fire: Bedfordshire
- Ambulance: East of England
- UK Parliament: North Bedfordshire

Oakley is a village and civil parish located in the Borough of Bedford in Bedfordshire, England, about four miles northwest of Bedford along the River Great Ouse. It has a population of 2,493 and is near the villages of Bromham, Milton Ernest, Clapham, Radwell and Felmersham.

== History ==
Some of the earliest evidence of a settlement was found within the current village boundaries in the form of flint axes and arrow heads labelled OAK(ley)and EAM(cdonald), which were dated to c. 7000–6000 BC. Iron Age (c. 50 BC.) evidence was found when excavations were undertaken for the Almshouses.

Oakley featured in the Domesday Book, and before the Norman Conquest, where the land was held by an Oswulf, a thane (companion) of King Edward the Confessor.

In 1166 AD, the lord of the manor was recorded as one Simon de Bosard, and his brother was known to have had connections with the town now known as Leighton Buzzard. In 1200 it was recorded that the present parish church was built, replacing an earlier church built of wood in Saxon times. Nothing of this earlier church remains. In 1230 the first vicar was recorded, a Stephen de Castell. In 1278, a Richard de Bosard had no male heir, but his daughter married Thomas Reynes who took over Oakley thanks to his wife. The village was known as Oakley Reynes at least until the drafting of the 1795 pre-enclosure map. The name still appears today in "Reynes Drive". The family also owned Clifton Reynes, just over the border into Buckinghamshire. In 1331, there was another Thomas Reynes recorded.

In 1349 the Black Death struck the village, and three vicars died that year; D. Walter, John Marshall and Robert Fox. The disease had a fatality rate of some 50%, and was caused by disease-carrying fleas living on the Black Rat. The medieval cottages provided full accommodation for rats in walls, thatch and under the earth floors. When rats died of the disease, the fleas attacked the human occupants. In 1451, John Reynes died and left no male heirs, so the village passed to the Taylard family. Again, in 1548 there were no male heirs to the Taylards, but the heiress married a Robert Brundenell, who took over. Oakley remained in the Brundenell family until 1648, when it passed to the Mordaunts. It is possible that after the Civil War had ended, the members of the losing side were made to pay heavily for their part in the conflict. Perhaps the Brundenells supported the King.

In 1671 a window tax was introduced, which recorded the population of Oakley as 255. In 1679 the Mordaunts sold Oakley to the Levinz family, who in their turn sold it in 1737 to the 4th Duke of Bedford. The Duke, a leading politician and successful business man, enlarged the Ducal properties considerably, buying Houghton House near Ampthill, as well as Oakley Manor House.

In 1735 an elderly Oakley woman was accused of being a witch, and was subjected to an ordeal by swimming.

After the purchase of Oakley House by the 4th Duke, the old house was demolished and a new (present) one was built on its site. It served as a hunting box for successive dukes, thirteen mile from their main seat at Woburn. In 1795, the Oakley Reynes Pre-Enclosure map was drawn, and in 1803 Oakley was enclosed. Records show the annual expenditure of the Church from Easter 1821 to Easter 1822 as £2.7s.3d. (£2.36). It gave its name to Oakley Square near Camden Town in London which was developed in the nineteenth century from land owned by the Dukes of Bedford.

In 1839, the 6th Duke of Bedford died and was succeeded by the 7th Duke, who improved the Bedford Estate and put the enterprise on a strong financial footing. In 1851, there was a census, which included details of church attendance at the three places of worship in the village – the Parish Church of St. Mary, the Primitive Methodist Chapel and the Congregational Church (now demolished).

The 7th Duke built new cottages for the Estate tenants, using the best materials available to avoid future repairs. These properties were easy to clean, and had all facilities – gardens, water supply etc. Also, the winding roads were straightened and a new road was built – Station Road – running from Lovell Road to where the station stood. The High Street was straightened, as was Duck End Road, now Church Lane. All the cottages in the High Street and Station Road were built in blocks for the sake of economy, usually six to a block. Most have a stone inscription in the gable showing a ducal coronet, a letter "B" for Bedford and the date of construction. Most of the earlier homes were of stone and thatch and were demolished when the new houses became available.

The old school, housed in two cottages in ruinous condition, was taken over by the Duke and the present building given to the village in 1842, the Duke taking over the cottages for his own use.

A village hall was built to celebrate the Diamond Jubilee of Queen Victoria. This was paid for by the Dowager Duchess, the widow of the 10th Duke. It was situated at the end of what is now Reynes Drive. It provided the village with a reading room for meetings, entertainment, and a library. The First World War saw great change. The 11th Duke had served in Egypt, and he set up a military training camp in Ampthill Park at his own expense. This, together with the expenditure on the estate, exceeded the income, and together with increased taxation occasioned by the war, forced him to reduce his land holdings. Therefore, in 1918, the Oakley estate was sold at auction by Knight, Frank and Rutley. Each tenant was given the opportunity of purchasing his own residence. From then on, Oakley ceased to be a ducal estate, and went into private ownership.

During the 1920s, Lovell Homes were built, together with bungalows along the north side of Church Lane. The 1930s saw more building in Church Lane and in-filling in the High Street. After the 1939–45 war, building resumed. Grange Farm was sold to the farming partnership of Ibbett and McKie, with Ibbett providing the financial expertise and McKie the agricultural experience. In due course, Jock McKie died, and the land passed into the sole ownership of the Ibbett family. A little while afterwards, planning permission for development on the farm was applied for and granted.

As a result, the whole centre of the village became the subject of a large building project. By 1967, a number of houses had been constructed, commencing with Ruffs Furze and Dewlands. The Grange Farm farmyard now has 38 large houses built on it. The Parish Council now look very closely at any new developments proposed within the village environs, and in the main planning is only permitted for individual properties.

In 2007 Oakley House was put up for sale for £2,950,000.

== Schools ==
There are two schools situated in the village, Oakley Primary School and Lincroft Academy.

== Pilgrims Oakley Cricket Club (POCC) ==
Oakley has a cricket club, Pilgrims Oakley Cricket Club. The Club has three Saturday teams, including a junior development team; all three play in the Bedford Invitational Saturday Cricket League. It also has a midweek team and two junior teams at U-12 and U-14 levels which play in the Bedford Youth Cricket League. In the winter the Club fields an indoor cricket team. It has outdoor nets and shares its facilities with the local football club. It is based at the Oakley Recreation Ground. The Club has links with neighbouring Lincroft School, sharing facilities and increasing opportunities for youth cricket in the local area. In 2014, Pilgrims Oakley received Clubmark accreditation from the ECB, recognition that it met various national standards.
