= D.I.C.E. Award for Outstanding Technical Achievement =

Annual award presented by the Academy of Interactive Arts & Sciences

- Country: United States
- Presented by: Academy of Interactive Arts & Sciences
- First award: 1998
- Currently held by: Death Stranding 2: On the Beach
- Website: interactive.org

The D.I.C.E. Award for Outstanding Technical Achievement is an award presented annually by the Academy of Interactive Arts & Sciences during the D.I.C.E. Awards. The award "celebrates the highest level of technical achievement through the combined attention to gameplay engineering and visual engineering. Elements honored include but are not limited to artificial intelligence, physics, engine mechanics, and visual rendering". Creative/technical Academy members with expertise as an artist, animator or programmer are qualified to vote for this award.

The award's most recent winner is Death Stranding 2: On the Beach, developed by Kojima Productions and published by Sony Interactive Entertainment.

== History ==
The first and second awards ceremonies offered the Outstanding Achievement in Software Engineering. In 2000, the award for software engineering was split into separate categories for Outstanding Achievement in Gameplay Engineering and Outstanding Achievement in Visual Engineering. Gameplay Engineering recognized "the highest level of achievement in engineering artificial intelligence and related elements which contribute to a challenging game". Visual Engineering would recognize "the highest level of achievement in rendering 3-D virtual environments for an interactive title." The two categories would eventually be merged into Outstanding Technical Achievement in 2015.

- Outstanding Achievement in Software Engineering (1998–1999)
- Outstanding Achievement in Gameplay Engineering (2000–2014)
- Outstanding Achievement in Visual Engineering (2000–2014)
- Outstanding Technical Achievement (2015–present)

There was tie for the award of Outstanding Achievement in Gameplay Engineering in 2006 between Guitar Hero and Nintendogs.

== Winners and nominees ==
Table key
Indicates the winner

=== 1990s ===
Year	Game	Developer(s)	Publisher(s)	Ref.
1997/1998 (Note: Presented as Outstanding Achievement in Software Engineering.) (1st)	GoldenEye 007	Rare	Nintendo	
1997/1998 (1st)	Blade Runner	Westwood Studios	Virgin Interactive	
1997/1998 (1st)	Microsoft Flight Simulator 98	Microsoft Simulation Group	Microsoft	
1997/1998 (1st)	NFL GameDay 98	Sony Interactive Studios America	Sony Computer Entertainment	
1997/1998 (1st)	NFL Quarterback Club 98	Iguana Entertainment	Acclaim Entertainment	
1997/1998 (1st)	Star Trek: Starfleet Academy	High Voltage Software	Interplay Productions	
1997/1998 (1st)	Temujin	SouthPeak Interactive	SouthPeak Interactive	
1997/1998 (1st)	Ultima Online	Origin Systems	Electronic Arts	
1998/1999 (2nd)	The Legend of Zelda: Ocarina of Time	Nintendo EAD	Nintendo	
1998/1999 (2nd)	Half-Life	Valve	Sierra On-Line	
1998/1999 (2nd)	Metal Gear Solid	Konami	Konami	
1998/1999 (2nd)	Motocross Madness	Rainbow Studios	Microsoft	
1998/1999 (2nd)	NFL Quarterback Club 99	Iguana Entertainment	Acclaim Entertainment	
1999/2000 (3rd)	Outstanding Achievement in Gameplay Engineering			
1999/2000 (3rd)	The Sims	Maxis	Electronic Arts	
1999/2000 (3rd)	Age of Empires II: The Age of Kings	Ensemble Studios	Microsoft Games	
1999/2000 (3rd)	Crazy Taxi	Hitmaker	Sega	
1999/2000 (3rd)	NFL 2K	Visual Concepts	Sega	
1999/2000 (3rd)	Outstanding Achievement in Visual Engineering			
1999/2000 (3rd)	Unreal Tournament	Epic Games, Digital Extremes	GT Interactive	
1999/2000 (3rd)	NBA 2K	Visual Concepts	Sega	
1999/2000 (3rd)	NFL 2K	Visual Concepts	Sega	
1999/2000 (3rd)	Sonic Adventure	Sonic Team	Sega	

=== 2000s ===
Year	Game	Developer(s)	Publisher(s)	Ref.
2000 (4th)	Outstanding Achievement in Gameplay Engineering			
2000 (4th)	SSX	EA Canada	Electronic Arts	
2000 (4th)	Baldur's Gate II: Shadows of Amn	BioWare	Black Isle Studios	
2000 (4th)	The Operative: No One Lives Forever	Monolith Productions	Fox Interactive	
2000 (4th)	Tony Hawk's Pro Skater 2	Neversoft	Activision	
2000 (4th)	Outstanding Achievement in Visual Engineering			
2000 (4th)	SSX	EA Canada	Electronic Arts	
2000 (4th)	FIFA 2001	EA Canada	Electronic Arts	
2000 (4th)	Jet Grind Radio	Smilebit	Sega	
2000 (4th)	Motocross Madness 2	Rainbow Studios	Microsoft Games	
2001 (5th)	Outstanding Achievement in Gameplay Engineering			
2001 (5th)	Grand Theft Auto III	DMA Design	Rockstar Games	
2001 (5th)	Black & White	Lionhead Studios	Electronic Arts	
2001 (5th)	Halo: Combat Evolved	Bungie	Microsoft Game Studios	
2001 (5th)	Monopoly Tycoon	Deep Red Games	Infogrames	
2001 (5th)	Outstanding Achievement in Visual Engineering			
2001 (5th)	Halo: Combat Evolved	Bungie	Microsoft Game Studios	
2001 (5th)	Gran Turismo 3: A-Spec	Polyphony Digital	Sony Computer Entertainment	
2001 (5th)	Microsoft Flight Simulator 2002	Microsoft Simulation Group	Microsoft Game Studios	
2001 (5th)	Return to Castle Wolfenstein	Gray Matter Studios	Activision	
2001 (5th)	Tony Hawk's Pro Skater 3	Neversoft	Activision	
2002 (6th)	Outstanding Achievement in Gameplay Engineering			
2002 (6th)	Tom Clancy's Splinter Cell	Ubisoft Montreal	Ubisoft	
2002 (6th)	Animal Crossing	Nintendo EAD	Nintendo	
2002 (6th)	Metroid Prime	Retro Studios	Nintendo	
2002 (6th)	Ratchet & Clank	Insomniac Games	Sony Computer Entertainment	
2002 (6th)	Outstanding Achievement in Visual Engineering			
2002 (6th)	The Lord of the Rings: The Two Towers	Stormfront Studios	Electronic Arts	
2002 (6th)	Asheron's Call 2: Fallen Kings	Turbine	Microsoft Game Studios	
2002 (6th)	Metroid Prime	Retro Studios	Nintendo	
2002 (6th)	Tom Clancy's Splinter Cell	Ubisoft Montreal	Ubisoft	
2002 (6th)	Unreal Tournament 2003	Epic Games, Digital Extremes	Atari	
2003 (7th)	Outstanding Achievement in Gameplay Engineering			
2003 (7th)	Prince of Persia: The Sands of Time	Ubisoft Montreal	Ubisoft	
2003 (7th)	Jak II	Naughty Dog	Sony Computer Entertainment	
2003 (7th)	Star Wars: Knights of the Old Republic	BioWare	LucasArts	
2003 (7th)	The Legend of Zelda: The Wind Waker	Nintendo EAD	Nintendo	
2003 (7th)	Outstanding Achievement in Visual Engineering			
2003 (7th)	Prince of Persia: The Sands of Time	Ubisoft Montreal	Ubisoft	
2003 (7th)	Jak II	Naughty Dog	Sony Computer Entertainment	
2003 (7th)	Ratchet & Clank: Going Commando	Insomniac Games	Sony Computer Entertainment	
2003 (7th)	SSX 3	EA Canada	Electronic Arts	
2003 (7th)	The Legend of Zelda: The Wind Waker	Nintendo EAD	Nintendo	
2004 (8th)	Outstanding Achievement in Gameplay Engineering			
2004 (8th)	Half-Life 2	Valve	Vivendi Universal Games	
2004 (8th)	Donkey Konga	Namco	Nintendo	
2004 (8th)	EyeToy: AntiGrav	Harmonix	Sony Computer Entertainment	
2004 (8th)	Fable	Lionhead Studios	Microsoft Game Studios	
2004 (8th)	Spider-Man 2	Treyarch	Activision	
2004 (8th)	Outstanding Achievement in Visual Engineering			
2004 (8th)	Half-Life 2	Valve	Vivendi Universal Games	
2004 (8th)	Doom 3	id Software	Activision	
2004 (8th)	Forgotten Realms: Demon Stone	Stormfront Studios	Atari	
2004 (8th)	Metroid Prime 2: Echoes	Retro Studios	Nintendo	
2004 (8th)	Ratchet & Clank: Up Your Arsenal	Insomniac Games	Sony Computer Entertainment	
2005 (9th)	Outstanding Achievement in Gameplay Engineering (Note: Tie between finalists.)			
2005 (9th)	Guitar Hero	Harmonix	RedOctane	
2005 (9th)	Nintendogs	Nintendo EAD	Nintendo	
2005 (9th)	God of War	Santa Monica Studio	Sony Computer Entertainment	
2005 (9th)	Lumines: Puzzle Fusion	Q Entertainment	Ubisoft	
2005 (9th)	Zoo Tycoon 2: Endangered Species	Blue Fang Games	Microsoft Game Studios	
2005 (9th)	Outstanding Achievement in Visual Engineering			
2005 (9th)	Shadow of the Colossus	Japan Studio	Sony Computer Entertainment	
2005 (9th)	Call of Duty 2	Infinity Ward	Activision	
2005 (9th)	F.E.A.R.	Monolith Productions	Vivendi Universal Games	
2005 (9th)	God of War	Santa Monica Studio	Sony Computer Entertainment	
2005 (9th)	Kameo	Rare	Microsoft Game Studios	
2006 (10th)	Outstanding Achievement in Gameplay Engineering			
2006 (10th)	Wii Sports	Nintendo EAD	Nintendo	
2006 (10th)	Company of Heroes	Relic Entertainment	THQ	
2006 (10th)	Gears of War	Epic Games	Microsoft Game Studios	
2006 (10th)	The Elder Scrolls IV: Oblivion	Bethesda Game Studios	2K Games	
2006 (10th)	The Legend of Zelda: Twilight Princess	Nintendo EAD	Nintendo	
2006 (10th)	Outstanding Achievement in Visual Engineering			
2006 (10th)	Gears of War	Epic Games	Microsoft Game Studios	
2006 (10th)	Call of Duty 3	Treyarch	Activision	
2006 (10th)	Company of Heroes	Relic Entertainment	THQ	
2006 (10th)	Resistance: Fall of Man	Insomniac Games	Sony Computer Entertainment	
2006 (10th)	Viva Piñata	Rare	Microsoft Game Studios	
2007 (11th)	Outstanding Achievement in Gameplay Engineering			
2007 (11th)	Portal	Valve	Valve, Electronic Arts	
2007 (11th)	Assassin's Creed	Ubisoft Montreal	Ubisoft	
2007 (11th)	Rock Band	Harmonix	MTV Games	
2007 (11th)	Super Mario Galaxy	Nintendo EAD	Nintendo	
2007 (11th)	The Legend of Zelda: Phantom Hourglass	Nintendo EAD	Nintendo	
2007 (11th)	Outstanding Achievement in Visual Engineering			
2007 (11th)	Crysis	Crytek	Electronic Arts	
2007 (11th)	Assassin's Creed	Ubisoft Montreal	Ubisoft	
2007 (11th)	Call of Duty 4: Modern Warfare	Infinity Ward	Activision	
2007 (11th)	Ratchet & Clank Future: Tools of Destruction	Insomniac Games	Sony Computer Entertainment	
2007 (11th)	Uncharted: Drake's Fortune	Naughty Dog	Sony Computer Entertainment	
2008 (12th)	Outstanding Achievement in Gameplay Engineering			
2008 (12th)	Spore	Maxis	Electronic Arts	
2008 (12th)	Fable II	Lionhead Studios	Microsoft Game Studios	
2008 (12th)	Fallout 3	Bethesda Game Studios	Bethesda Softworks	
2008 (12th)	Left 4 Dead	Valve South	Valve	
2008 (12th)	Tom Clancy's EndWar	Ubisoft Shanghai	Ubisoft	
2008 (12th)	Outstanding Achievement in Visual Engineering			
2008 (12th)	LittleBigPlanet	Media Molecule	Sony Computer Entertainment	
2008 (12th)	Gears of War 2	Epic Games	Microsoft Game Studios	
2008 (12th)	Metal Gear Solid 4: Guns of the Patriots	Kojima Productions	Konami	
2008 (12th)	Resistance 2	Insomniac Games	Sony Computer Entertainment	
2008 (12th)	Tomb Raider: Underworld	Crystal Dynamics	Eidos Interactive	
2009 (13th)	Outstanding Achievement in Gameplay Engineering			
2009 (13th)	Uncharted 2: Among Thieves	Naughty Dog	Sony Computer Entertainment	
2009 (13th)	Assassin's Creed II	Ubisoft Montreal	Ubisoft	
2009 (13th)	Forza Motorsport 3	Turn 10 Studios	Microsoft Game Studios	
2009 (13th)	Left 4 Dead 2	Valve	Valve	
2009 (13th)	New Super Mario Bros. Wii	Nintendo EAD	Nintendo	
2009 (13th)	Outstanding Achievement in Visual Engineering			
2009 (13th)	Uncharted 2: Among Thieves	Naughty Dog	Sony Computer Entertainment	
2009 (13th)	Assassin's Creed II	Ubisoft Montreal	Ubisoft	
2009 (13th)	Call of Duty: Modern Warfare 2	Infinity Ward	Activision	
2009 (13th)	Killzone 2	Guerrilla Games	Sony Computer Entertainment	
2009 (13th)	Ratchet & Clank Future: A Crack in Time	Insomniac Games	Sony Computer Entertainment	

=== 2010s ===
Year	Game	Developer(s)	Publisher(s)	Ref.
2010 (14th)	Outstanding Achievement in Gameplay Engineering			
2010 (14th)	Red Dead Redemption	Rockstar San Diego	Rockstar Games	
2010 (14th)	Dance Central	Harmonix	MTV Games	
2010 (14th)	Kirby's Epic Yarn	Good-Feel, HAL Laboratory	Nintendo	
2010 (14th)	Super Mario Galaxy 2	Nintendo EAD	Nintendo	
2010 (14th)	Super Scribblenauts	5th Cell	Warner Bros. Interactive Entertainment	
2010 (14th)	Outstanding Achievement in Visual Engineering			
2010 (14th)	Heavy Rain	Quantic Dream	Sony Computer Entertainment	
2010 (14th)	Call of Duty: Black Ops	Treyarch	Activision	
2010 (14th)	God of War III	Santa Monica Studio	Sony Computer Entertainment	
2010 (14th)	Medal of Honor	Danger Close Games, DICE	Electronic Arts	
2010 (14th)	Metro 2033	4A Games	THQ	
2011 (15th)	Outstanding Achievement in Gameplay Engineering			
2011 (15th)	The Elder Scrolls V: Skyrim	Bethesda Game Studios	Bethesda Softworks	
2011 (15th)	Batman: Arkham City	Rocksteady Studios	Warner Bros. Interactive Entertainment	
2011 (15th)	Portal 2	Valve	Valve	
2011 (15th)	Skylanders: Spyro's Adventure	Toys for Bob, XPEC Entertainment	Activision	
2011 (15th)	The Legend of Zelda: Skyward Sword	Nintendo EAD	Nintendo	
2011 (15th)	Outstanding Achievement in Visual Engineering			
2011 (15th)	Uncharted 3: Drake's Deception	Naughty Dog	Sony Computer Entertainment	
2011 (15th)	Battlefield 3	DICE	Electronic Arts	
2011 (15th)	Crysis 2	Crytek	Electronic Arts	
2011 (15th)	L.A. Noire	Team Bondi	Rockstar Games	
2011 (15th)	Rage	id Software	Bethesda Softworks	
2012 (16th)	Outstanding Achievement in Gameplay Engineering			
2012 (16th)	XCOM: Enemy Unknown	Firaxis Games	2K Games	
2012 (16th)	Dishonored	Arkane Studios	Bethesda Softworks	
2012 (16th)	Gravity Rush	Japan Studio	Sony Computer Entertainment	
2012 (16th)	Journey	Thatgamecompany	Sony Computer Entertainment	
2012 (16th)	The Walking Dead	Telltale Games	Telltale Games	
2012 (16th)	Outstanding Achievement in Visual Engineering			
2012 (16th)	Halo 4	343 Industries	Microsoft Studios	
2012 (16th)	Call of Duty: Black Ops II	Treyarch	Activision	
2012 (16th)	Hitman: Absolution	IO Interactive	Square Enix Europe	
2012 (16th)	Need for Speed: Most Wanted	Criterion Games	Electronic Arts	
2012 (16th)	Total War: Shogun 2: Fall of the Samurai	Creative Assembly	Sega	
2013 (17th)	Outstanding Achievement in Gameplay Engineering			
2013 (17th)	Grand Theft Auto V	Rockstar North	Rockstar Games	
2013 (17th)	Assassin's Creed IV: Black Flag	Ubisoft Montreal	Ubisoft	
2013 (17th)	Forza Motorsport 5	Turn 10 Studios	Microsoft Studios	
2013 (17th)	Super Mario 3D World	Nintendo EAD	Nintendo	
2013 (17th)	The Last of Us	Naughty Dog	Sony Computer Entertainment	
2013 (17th)	Outstanding Achievement in Visual Engineering			
2013 (17th)	The Last of Us	Naughty Dog	Sony Computer Entertainment	
2013 (17th)	Assassin's Creed IV: Black Flag	Ubisoft Montreal	Ubisoft	
2013 (17th)	Battlefield 4	DICE	Electronic Arts	
2013 (17th)	Grand Theft Auto V	Rockstar North	Rockstar Games	
2013 (17th)	Ryse: Son of Rome	Crytek	Microsoft Studios	
2014 (18th)	Middle-earth: Shadow of Mordor	Monolith Productions	Warner Bros. Interactive Entertainment	
2014 (18th)	Call of Duty: Advanced Warfare	Sledgehammer Games	Activision	
2014 (18th)	Far Cry 4	Ubisoft Montreal	Ubisoft	
2014 (18th)	Infamous Second Son	Sucker Punch Productions	Sony Computer Entertainment	
2014 (18th)	Sunset Overdrive	Insomniac Games	Microsoft Studios	
2015 (19th)	The Witcher 3: Wild Hunt	CD Projekt Red	CD Projekt	
2015 (19th)	Just Cause 3	Avalanche Software	Square Enix Europe	
2015 (19th)	Rise of the Tomb Raider	Crystal Dynamics	Square Enix Europe	
2015 (19th)	Star Wars Battlefront	DICE	Electronic Arts	
2015 (19th)	The Order: 1886	Ready at Dawn	Sony Computer Entertainment	
2016 (20th)	Uncharted 4: A Thief's End	Naughty Dog	Sony Interactive Entertainment	
2016 (20th)	Battlefield 1	DICE	Electronic Arts	
2016 (20th)	No Man's Sky	Hello Games	Hello Games	
2016 (20th)	Overwatch	Blizzard Entertainment	Blizzard Entertainment	
2016 (20th)	Titanfall 2	Respawn Entertainment	Electronic Arts	
2017 (21st)	Horizon Zero Dawn	Guerrilla Games	Sony Interactive Entertainment	
2017 (21st)	Assassin's Creed Origins	Ubisoft Montreal	Ubisoft	
2017 (21st)	Hellblade: Senua's Sacrifice	Ninja Theory	Ninja Theory	
2017 (21st)	Lone Echo/Echo Arena	Ready at Dawn	Oculus Studios	
2017 (21st)	The Legend of Zelda: Breath of the Wild	Nintendo EPD	Nintendo	
2018 (22nd)	Red Dead Redemption 2	Rockstar Games	Rockstar Games	
2018 (22nd)	Astro Bot Rescue Mission	Japan Studio	Sony Interactive Entertainment	
2018 (22nd)	Battlefield V	DICE	Electronic Arts	
2018 (22nd)	God of War	Santa Monica Studio	Sony Interactive Entertainment	
2018 (22nd)	Marvel's Spider-Man	Insomniac Games	Sony Interactive Entertainment	
2019 (23rd)	Death Stranding	Kojima Productions	Sony Interactive Entertainment	
2019 (23rd)	Call of Duty: Modern Warfare	Infinity Ward	Activision	
2019 (23rd)	Concrete Genie	Pixelopus	Sony Interactive Entertainment	
2019 (23rd)	Control	Remedy Entertainment	505 Games	
2019 (23rd)	Metro Exodus	4A Games	Deep Silver	

=== 2020s ===
Year	Game	Developer(s)	Publisher(s)	Ref.
2020 (24th)	Dreams	Media Molecule	Sony Interactive Entertainment	
2020 (24th)	Ghost of Tsushima	Sucker Punch Productions	Sony Interactive Entertainment	
2020 (24th)	The Last of Us Part II	Naughty Dog	Sony Interactive Entertainment	
2020 (24th)	Mario Kart Live: Home Circuit	Velan Studios	Nintendo	
2020 (24th)	Microsoft Flight Simulator	Asobo Studio	Xbox Game Studios	
2021 (25th)	Ratchet & Clank: Rift Apart	Insomniac Games	Sony Interactive Entertainment	
2021 (25th)	Battlefield 2042	DICE	Electronic Arts	
2021 (25th)	Forza Horizon 5	Playground Games	Xbox Game Studios	
2021 (25th)	Moncage	Optillusion	X.D. Network	
2021 (25th)	Returnal	Housemarque	Sony Interactive Entertainment	
2022 (26th)	Elden Ring	FromSoftware	Bandai Namco Entertainment	
2022 (26th)	A Plague Tale: Requiem	Asobo Studio	Focus Entertainment	
2022 (26th)	God of War Ragnarök	Santa Monica Studio	Sony Interactive Entertainment	
2022 (26th)	Horizon Forbidden West	Guerrilla Games	Sony Interactive Entertainment	
2022 (26th)	Teardown	Tuxedo Labs	Tuxedo Labs	
2023 (27th)	Marvel's Spider-Man 2	Insomniac Games	Sony Interactive Entertainment	
2023 (27th)	Alan Wake 2	Remedy Entertainment	Epic Games	
2023 (27th)	Hogwarts Legacy	Avalanche Software	Warner Bros. Games	
2023 (27th)	The Finals	Embark Studios	Embark Studios	
2023 (27th)	The Legend of Zelda: Tears of the Kingdom	Nintendo EPD	Nintendo	
2024 (28th)	Astro Bot	Team Asobi	Sony Interactive Entertainment	
2024 (28th)	Batman: Arkham Shadow	Camouflaj	Oculus Studios	
2024 (28th)	Indiana Jones and the Great Circle	MachineGames	Bethesda Softworks	
2024 (28th)	Senua's Saga: Hellblade II	Ninja Theory	Xbox Game Studios	
2024 (28th)	Warhammer 40,000: Space Marine 2	Saber Interactive	Focus Entertainment	
2025 (29th)	Death Stranding 2: On the Beach	Kojima Productions	Sony Interactive Entertainment	
2025 (29th)	ARC Raiders	Embark Studios	Embark Studios	
2025 (29th)	Assassin's Creed Shadows	Ubisoft Québec	Ubisoft	
2025 (29th)	Donkey Kong Bananza	Nintendo EPD	Nintendo	
2025 (29th)	Doom: The Dark Ages	id Software	Bethesda Softworks	

== Multiple nominations and wins ==
=== Developers and publishers ===
Sony has published the most nominees, as well as the most winners. Sony's subsidiary Naughty Dog has developed the most winners, while Nintendo EAD (now EPD) has developed the most nominees. Nintendo has also published both winners for Outstanding Achievement in Software Engineering. There have been two developers with back-to-back wins for Outstanding Achievement in Gameplay Engineering:

- Nintendo EAD: Nintendogs (Note: Tied with Guitar Hero.) in 2006 and Wii Sports in 2007.
- Ubisoft Montreal: Tom Clancy's Splinter Cell in 2003 and Prince of Persia: The Sands of Time in 2004.

Four developers have developed winners for both Gameplay Engineering and Visual Engineering: EA Canada, Ubisoft Montreal, Valve, and Naughty Dog. Electronic Arts has published the winners for both awards with different developers for different games in 2008. Sony has published the winners for Visual Engineering for four consecutive years with LittleBigPlanet (2009), Uncharted 2: Among Thieves (2010), Heavy Rain (2011), and Uncharted 3: Drake's Deception (2012). Activision has published the most nominees without having a single winner. Electronic Arts developer DICE has developed the most nominees without a single winner.

Developers
Developer	Nominations	Wins
Naughty Dog	10	5
Nintendo EAD/EPD	16	3
Ubisoft Montreal	12	3
Valve	6	3
Insomniac Games	11	2
Epic Games	5	2
EA Canada	4	2
Kojima Productions	3	2
Rockstar North/DMA Design	3	2
Maxis	2	2
Media Molecule	2	2
Harmonix	4	1
Bethesda Game Studios	3	1
Crytek	3	1
Guerrilla Games	3	1
Japan Studio	3	1
Monolith Productions	3	1
Rare	3	1
Bungie	2	1
Digital Extremes	2	1
Stormfront Studios	2	1
DICE	7	0
Santa Monica Studio	5	0
Infinity Ward	4	0
Treyarch	4	0
id Software	3	0
Lionhead Studios	3	0
Retro Studios	3	0
Visual Concepts	3	0
4A Games	2	0
Asobo Studio	2	0
BioWare	2	0
Crystal Dynamics	2	0
Embark Studios	2	0
Iguana Entertainment	2	0
Microsoft Simulation Group	2	0
Neversoft	2	0
Ninja Theory	2	0
Rainbow Studios	2	0
Ready at Dawn	2	0
Relic Entertainment	2	0
Remedy Entertainment	2	0
Santa Monica Studio	2	0
Sucker Punch Productions	2	0
Turn 10 Studios	2	0

Publishers
Publisher	Nominations	Wins
Sony Computer/Interactive Entertainment	44	15
Electronic Arts	21	7
Nintendo	21	4
Rockstar Games	6	4
Microsoft/Xbox Game Studios	24	3
Ubisoft	15	3
Valve	6	3
Sierra On-Line/Entertainment	3	2
Bethesda Softworks	6	1
Warner Bros. Interactive Entertainment/Games	3	1
2K Games	2	1
Activision	14	0
Sega	7	0
Square Enix Europe/Eidos Interactive	4	0
THQ	3	0
Acclaim Entertainment	2	0
Atari	2	0
Embark Studios	2	0
Focus Entertainment	2	0
Konami	2	0
MTV Games	2	0
Oculus Studios	2	0

=== Franchises ===
The Legend of Zelda, Assassin's Creed and Call of Duty are the most nominated franchises in this category. Uncharted is the most award-winning franchise, with Uncharted 2: Among Thieves being one of four games to win both awards in gameplay and visual engineering; the other three are SSX, Prince of Persia: The Sands of Time, and Half-Life 2. Uncharted and Halo have won the awards for "Visual Engineering" twice, while Grand Theft Auto is the only franchise to win for "Gameplay Engineering" twice. Despite the record-tying nomination count, both Assassin's Creed and Call of Duty have never won an award outright.

Franchises
Franchise	Nominations	Wins
Uncharted	5	4
Grand Theft Auto	3	2
Half-Life	3	2
Halo	3	2
SSX	3	2
Death Stranding	2	2
Prince of Persia	2	2
Red Dead	2	2
The Legend of Zelda	8	1
Ratchet & Clank	6	1
Gears of War	3	1
Spider-Man	3	1
The Last of Us	3	1
Tom Clancy's	3	1
Astro Bot	2	1
Crysis	2	1
Horizon	2	1
Portal	2	1
The Elder Scrolls	2	1
Assassin's Creed	8	0
Call of Duty	8	0
Battlefield	5	0
God of War	5	0
Mario	5	0
Forza	3	0
Metroid	3	0
Microsoft Flight Simulator	3	0
Batman: Arkham	2	0
Company of Heroes	2	0
Donkey Kong	2	0
Doom	2	0
Fable	2	0
Hellblade	2	0
Jak & Daxter	2	0
Left 4 Dead	2	0
Metal Gear	2	0
Metro	2	0
Motocross Madness	2	0
NFL 2K	2	0
NFL Quarterback Club	2	0
Resistance	2	0
Star Wars	2	0
Tomb Raider	2	0
Tony Hawk's	2	0
Unreal	2	0
