= 2010 FIA GT3 European Championship =

Sports car racing season

Seasons
- ← 2009 2011 →

The 2010 FIA GT3 European Championship season was the fifth season of the FIA GT3 European Championship. The season commenced on 1 May at Silverstone and ended on 10 October at Circuit Zolder. The season featured six double-header rounds, with each race lasting for a duration of 60 minutes. Most of the events were support races to the newly formed FIA GT1 World Championship.

Despite FIA's efforts to slow down the Callaway Competition-entered Chevrolet Corvette of Christian Hohenadel and Daniel Keilwitz via extensive performance balancing, the pairing finished the season as champions, taking four victories to secure the title with a meeting to spare; the second such championship crown for a team running a Corvette after the 2008 triumph of French duo Arnaud Peyroles and James Ruffier.

The championship-winning margin for Hohenadel and Keilwitz was 46 points over the Prospeed Competition Porsche of Paul van Splunteren and Marco Holzer, who took two wins over the course of the season at Portimão and Zolder. Another Corvette, run by Graff Racing, finished in third place with drivers Joakim Lambotte and Mike Parisy, who won both races at Brno. Four other duos took race victories during the season; Siso Cunill and Tim Bergmeister of Trackspeed won the season-opening race at Silverstone, Kenneth Heyer and Bernd Herdlhofer, and Csaba Walter and Claudia Hürtgen won at Jarama for Team Rosberg and Schubert Motorsport respectively, with the other Schubert Motorsport car of Patrick Söderlund and Edward Sandström winning at Zolder.

Prospeed Competition won the Teams' Championship, but were only confirmed as champions in December following a hearing to the FIA International Court of Appeal. Van Splunteren and Holzer had been disqualified from a victory at Zolder, due to a technical infringement regarding the weight of the car's rear brake discs.

Ultimately, Prospeed were reinstated which allowed them to regain the teams title which Callaway Competition had assumed from the disqualification. Callaway finished second, ten points behind Prospeed, with Schubert Motorsport finishing third. In the Manufacturers' Cups, the top-two overall placings for Hohenadel and Keilwitz, and van Splunteren and Holzer helped to claim the cups for Corvette and Porsche respectively. The other cup, for Audi drivers, was won by Ireland's Seán Paul Breslin for the German Black Falcon team.

== Entries and Drivers ==
The list below contains the confirmed teams and drivers that competed in the 2010 championship.

Team	Chassis	Engine	No.	Drivers	Rounds	Tyres
(France) Hexis AMR	Aston Martin DBRS9	Aston Martin 6.0 L V12	1	(France) Manuel Rodrigues	All	M
(France) Hexis AMR	Aston Martin DBRS9	Aston Martin 6.0 L V12	1	(France) Frédéric Makowiecki	All	M
(France) Hexis AMR	Aston Martin DBRS9	Aston Martin 6.0 L V12	2	(France) Luc Paillard	All	M
(France) Hexis AMR	Aston Martin DBRS9	Aston Martin 6.0 L V12	2	(France) Thomas Accary	All	M
(Germany) Team Rosberg	Audi R8 LMS	Audi 5.2 L V10	3	(Germany) Kenneth Heyer	All	M
(Germany) Team Rosberg	Audi R8 LMS	Audi 5.2 L V10	3	(Germany) Johannes Seidlitz	1	M
(Germany) Team Rosberg	Audi R8 LMS	Audi 5.2 L V10	3	(Austria) Bernd Herndlhofer	2–4	M
(Germany) Team Rosberg	Audi R8 LMS	Audi 5.2 L V10	3	(France) Grégoire Demoustier	5	M
(Germany) Team Rosberg	Audi R8 LMS	Audi 5.2 L V10	3	(Belgium) Stéphane Lémeret	6	M
(Germany) Team Rosberg	Audi R8 LMS	Audi 5.2 L V10	4	(Brazil) Paolo Bonifácio	1–5	M
(Germany) Team Rosberg	Audi R8 LMS	Audi 5.2 L V10	4	(Germany) Michael Ammermüller	All	M
(Germany) Team Rosberg	Audi R8 LMS	Audi 5.2 L V10	4	(France) Grégoire Demoustier	6	M
(France) Saintéloc Phoenix Racing	Audi R8 LMS	Audi 5.2 L V10	5	(Switzerland) Pierre Hirschi	All	M
(France) Saintéloc Phoenix Racing	Audi R8 LMS	Audi 5.2 L V10	5	(France) Bruce Lorgère-Roux	1–3	M
(France) Saintéloc Phoenix Racing	Audi R8 LMS	Audi 5.2 L V10	5	(France) Grégory Guilvert	4–6	M
(France) Saintéloc Phoenix Racing	Audi R8 LMS	Audi 5.2 L V10	6	(Belgium) Greg Franchi	1–3	M
(France) Saintéloc Phoenix Racing	Audi R8 LMS	Audi 5.2 L V10	6	(Belgium) Stéphane Lémeret	1–3	M
(France) Saintéloc Phoenix Racing	Audi R8 LMS	Audi 5.2 L V10	6	(France) Jérôme Demay	4–6	M
(France) Saintéloc Phoenix Racing	Audi R8 LMS	Audi 5.2 L V10	6	(France) Bruce Lorgère-Roux	4–6	M
(Austria) Team S-Berg Racing	BMW Alpina B6 GT3	BMW (Alpina) 4.4 L S/C V8	9	(Czech Republic) Martin Matzke	1–3	M
(Austria) Team S-Berg Racing	BMW Alpina B6 GT3	BMW (Alpina) 4.4 L S/C V8	9	(Austria) Nikolaus Mayr-Melnhof	1–3	M
(Austria) Team S-Berg Racing	BMW Alpina B6 GT3	BMW (Alpina) 4.4 L S/C V8	10	(France) Thierry Stépec	4	M
(Austria) Team S-Berg Racing	BMW Alpina B6 GT3	BMW (Alpina) 4.4 L S/C V8	10	(France) Jérôme Policand	4	M
(Belgium) Mühlner Motorsport	Porsche 997 GT3-R	Porsche 4.0 L Flat-6	11	(France) Gilles Vannelet	All	M
(Belgium) Mühlner Motorsport	Porsche 997 GT3-R	Porsche 4.0 L Flat-6	11	(United Kingdom) Joe Osborne	1–3	M
(Belgium) Mühlner Motorsport	Porsche 997 GT3-R	Porsche 4.0 L Flat-6	11	(France) Antoine Leclerc	4	M
(Belgium) Mühlner Motorsport	Porsche 997 GT3-R	Porsche 4.0 L Flat-6	11	(Austria) Niki Lanik	5	M
(Belgium) Mühlner Motorsport	Porsche 997 GT3-R	Porsche 4.0 L Flat-6	11	(France) Raymond Narac	6	M
(Belgium) Mühlner Motorsport	Porsche 997 GT3-R	Porsche 4.0 L Flat-6	12	(Germany) Jürgen Häring	1–5	M
(Belgium) Mühlner Motorsport	Porsche 997 GT3-R	Porsche 4.0 L Flat-6	12	(France) Kévin Estre	1–2	M
(Belgium) Mühlner Motorsport	Porsche 997 GT3-R	Porsche 4.0 L Flat-6	12	(Germany) Philip Geipel	3	M
(Belgium) Mühlner Motorsport	Porsche 997 GT3-R	Porsche 4.0 L Flat-6	12	(Greece) Dimitrios Konstantinou	4–5	M
(Belgium) Mühlner Motorsport	Porsche 997 GT3-R	Porsche 4.0 L Flat-6	12	(Belgium) Armand Fumal	6	M
(Belgium) Mühlner Motorsport	Porsche 997 GT3-R	Porsche 4.0 L Flat-6	12	(Belgium) Jérôme Thiry	6	M
(Germany) Fischer Racing	Ford GT GT3	Ford Cammer 5.0 L V8	14	(Finland) Mikko Eskelinen	All	M
(Germany) Fischer Racing	Ford GT GT3	Ford Cammer 5.0 L V8	14	(Denmark) Christoffer Nygaard	1–4, 6	M
(Germany) Fischer Racing	Ford GT GT3	Ford Cammer 5.0 L V8	14	(Germany) Florian Gruber	5	M
(France) Graff Racing	Corvette Z06.R GT3	Chevrolet LS7 7.0 L V8	16	(France) Joakim Lambotte	All	M
(France) Graff Racing	Corvette Z06.R GT3	Chevrolet LS7 7.0 L V8	16	(France) Mike Parisy	All	M
(France) Graff Racing	Corvette Z06.R GT3	Chevrolet LS7 7.0 L V8	17	(France) Arnaud Vincent	1–2, 6	M
(France) Graff Racing	Corvette Z06.R GT3	Chevrolet LS7 7.0 L V8	17	(France) Arnaud Peyroles	1–3, 6	M
(France) Graff Racing	Corvette Z06.R GT3	Chevrolet LS7 7.0 L V8	17	(France) Grégoire Demoustier	3–4	M
(France) Graff Racing	Corvette Z06.R GT3	Chevrolet LS7 7.0 L V8	17	(France) Henri-Gérard Tonelli	4	M
(Switzerland) Toni Seiler Racing	Corvette Z06.R GT3	Chevrolet LS7 7.0 L V8	18	(Switzerland) Toni Seiler	1–4	M
(Switzerland) Toni Seiler Racing	Corvette Z06.R GT3	Chevrolet LS7 7.0 L V8	18	(France) Dino Lunardi	1–4	M
(United Kingdom) Trackspeed	Porsche 997 GT3-R	Porsche 4.0 L Flat-6	20	(Spain) Siso Cunill	1–2	M
(United Kingdom) Trackspeed	Porsche 997 GT3-R	Porsche 4.0 L Flat-6	20	(Germany) Tim Bergmeister	1	M
(United Kingdom) Trackspeed	Porsche 997 GT3-R	Porsche 4.0 L Flat-6	20	(United Kingdom) Phil Keen	2	M
(United Kingdom) Trackspeed	Porsche 997 GT3-R	Porsche 4.0 L Flat-6	21	(United Kingdom) David Ashburn	1	M
(United Kingdom) Trackspeed	Porsche 997 GT3-R	Porsche 4.0 L Flat-6	21	(Austria) Martin Ragginger	1	M
(United Kingdom) Trackspeed	Porsche 997 GT3-R	Porsche 4.0 L Flat-6	21	(Turkey) Yücel Özbek	2	M
(United Kingdom) Trackspeed	Porsche 997 GT3-R	Porsche 4.0 L Flat-6	21	(Netherlands) Kevin Veltman	2	M
(United States) United Autosports	Audi R8 LMS	Audi 5.2 L V10	22	(United States) Michael Guasch	All	M D
(United States) United Autosports	Audi R8 LMS	Audi 5.2 L V10	22	(United States) Mark Patterson	All	M D
(United States) United Autosports	Audi R8 LMS	Audi 5.2 L V10	23	(United Kingdom) Matthew Bell	All	M D
(United States) United Autosports	Audi R8 LMS	Audi 5.2 L V10	23	(United States) Zak Brown	All	M D
(Belgium) Argo Racing	Lamborghini Gallardo LP560-4	Lamborghini 5.2 L V10	24	(Germany) Albert von Thurn und Taxis	1–4	M
(Belgium) Argo Racing	Lamborghini Gallardo LP560-4	Lamborghini 5.2 L V10	24	(Italy) Giorgio Sanna	1, 3	M
(Belgium) Argo Racing	Lamborghini Gallardo LP560-4	Lamborghini 5.2 L V10	24	(Germany) Philip Geipel	2	M
(Belgium) Argo Racing	Lamborghini Gallardo LP560-4	Lamborghini 5.2 L V10	24	(Italy) Eugenio Amos	4	M
(Belgium) Argo Racing	Lamborghini Gallardo LP560-4	Lamborghini 5.2 L V10	25	(Germany) Ellen Lohr	1	M
(Belgium) Argo Racing	Lamborghini Gallardo LP560-4	Lamborghini 5.2 L V10	25	(Germany) Philip Geipel	1	M
(Belgium) Argo Racing	Lamborghini Gallardo LP560-4	Lamborghini 5.2 L V10	25	(Italy) Giorgio Sanna	2	M
(Belgium) Argo Racing	Lamborghini Gallardo LP560-4	Lamborghini 5.2 L V10	25	(Germany) Charlie Geipel	2	M
(Belgium) Argo Racing	Lamborghini Gallardo LP560-4	Lamborghini 5.2 L V10	25	(Spain) Siso Cunill	4	M
(Belgium) Argo Racing	Lamborghini Gallardo LP560-4	Lamborghini 5.2 L V10	25	(Belgium) Niels Lagrange	4	M
(Belgium) Belgian Audi Club	Audi R8 LMS	Audi 5.2 L V10	27	(Belgium) Enzo Ide	6	M
(Belgium) Belgian Audi Club	Audi R8 LMS	Audi 5.2 L V10	27	(Belgium) Greg Franchi	6	M
(United Kingdom) Duncan Cameron Racing	Ferrari 430 Scuderia GT3	Ferrari 4.3 L V8	28	(United Kingdom) Duncan Cameron	6	M
(United Kingdom) Duncan Cameron Racing	Ferrari 430 Scuderia GT3	Ferrari 4.3 L V8	28	(Republic of Ireland) Matt Griffin	6	M
(Germany) Team Rhinos Leipert	Ascari KZ1-R GT3	BMW S62 4.9 L V8	30	(Russia) Rustem Teregulov	6	M
(Germany) Team Rhinos Leipert	Ascari KZ1-R GT3	BMW S62 4.9 L V8	30	(Russia) Andrei Romanov	6	M
(Germany) Black Falcon	Audi R8 LMS	Audi 5.2 L V10	32	(Republic of Ireland) Seán Patrick Breslin	1–5	M
(Germany) Black Falcon	Audi R8 LMS	Audi 5.2 L V10	32	(Tanzania) Vimal Mehta	1, 3, 5	M
(Germany) Black Falcon	Audi R8 LMS	Audi 5.2 L V10	32	(United States) Robert Kauffmann	2	M
(Germany) Black Falcon	Audi R8 LMS	Audi 5.2 L V10	32	(Republic of Ireland) Matt Griffin	4	M
(Germany) Black Falcon	Audi R8 LMS	Audi 5.2 L V10	33	(Republic of Ireland) Seán Paul Breslin	1–5	M
(Germany) Black Falcon	Audi R8 LMS	Audi 5.2 L V10	33	(Austria) Johannes Stuck	1–2	M
(Germany) Black Falcon	Audi R8 LMS	Audi 5.2 L V10	33	(Germany) Christer Jöns	3–4	M
(Germany) Black Falcon	Audi R8 LMS	Audi 5.2 L V10	33	(Germany) Jan Seyffarth	5	M
(Belgium) Prospeed Competition	Porsche 997 GT3 R	Porsche 4.0 L Flat-6	60	(Finland) Petri Lappalainen	All	M
(Belgium) Prospeed Competition	Porsche 997 GT3 R	Porsche 4.0 L Flat-6	60	(Finland) Markus Palttala	All	M
(Belgium) Prospeed Competition	Porsche 997 GT3 R	Porsche 4.0 L Flat-6	61	(Netherlands) Paul van Splunteren	All	M
(Belgium) Prospeed Competition	Porsche 997 GT3 R	Porsche 4.0 L Flat-6	61	(Germany) Marco Holzer	All	M
(Germany) Need for Speed by Schubert Motorsport	BMW Z4 GT3	BMW 4.0 L V8	76	(Hungary) Csaba Walter	1	D
(Germany) Need for Speed by Schubert Motorsport	BMW Z4 GT3	BMW 4.0 L V8	76	(Germany) Claudia Hürtgen	1	D
(Germany) Need for Speed by Schubert Motorsport	BMW Z4 GT3	BMW 4.0 L V8	76	(Sweden) Edward Sandström	2–6	D
(Germany) Need for Speed by Schubert Motorsport	BMW Z4 GT3	BMW 4.0 L V8	76	(Sweden) Patrick Söderlund	2–6	D
(Germany) Need for Speed by Schubert Motorsport	BMW Z4 GT3	BMW 4.0 L V8	77	(Sweden) Edward Sandström	1	D
(Germany) Need for Speed by Schubert Motorsport	BMW Z4 GT3	BMW 4.0 L V8	77	(Sweden) Patrick Söderlund	1	D
(Germany) Need for Speed by Schubert Motorsport	BMW Z4 GT3	BMW 4.0 L V8	77	(Hungary) Csaba Walter	2–6	D
(Germany) Need for Speed by Schubert Motorsport	BMW Z4 GT3	BMW 4.0 L V8	77	(Germany) Claudia Hürtgen	2–6	D
(United Kingdom) Chad Racing	Ferrari 430 Scuderia GT3	Ferrari 4.3 L V8	87	(Italy) Giacomo Petrobelli	1–5	M
(United Kingdom) Chad Racing	Ferrari 430 Scuderia GT3	Ferrari 4.3 L V8	87	(Italy) Diego Alessi	1–5	M
(United Kingdom) Chad Racing	Ferrari 430 Scuderia GT3	Ferrari 4.3 L V8	87	(United Kingdom) Iain Dockerill	6	M
(United Kingdom) Chad Racing	Ferrari 430 Scuderia GT3	Ferrari 4.3 L V8	87	(United Kingdom) Tom Ferrier	6	M
(United Kingdom) Chad Racing	Ferrari 430 Scuderia GT3	Ferrari 4.3 L V8	88	(France) Damien Charveriat	2–5	M
(United Kingdom) Chad Racing	Ferrari 430 Scuderia GT3	Ferrari 4.3 L V8	88	(United Kingdom) Charles Hollings	2–5	M
(Belgium) Marc VDS Racing Team	Ford Mustang Marc VDS GT3	Ford 5.3 L V8	98	(Belgium) Eric De Doncker	2–3	M
(Belgium) Marc VDS Racing Team	Ford Mustang Marc VDS GT3	Ford 5.3 L V8	98	(Canada) Scott Maxwell	2	M
(Belgium) Marc VDS Racing Team	Ford Mustang Marc VDS GT3	Ford 5.3 L V8	98	(Belgium) Maxime Martin	3	M
(Belgium) Marc VDS Racing Team	Ford GT GT3	Ford Cammer 5.0 L V8	98	(Belgium) Eric De Doncker	5–6	M
(Belgium) Marc VDS Racing Team	Ford GT GT3	Ford Cammer 5.0 L V8	98	(Switzerland) Mathias Beche	5–6	M
(Belgium) Marc VDS Racing Team	Ford GT GT3	Ford Cammer 5.0 L V8	99	(France) Gaël Lesoudier	5–6	M
(Belgium) Marc VDS Racing Team	Ford GT GT3	Ford Cammer 5.0 L V8	99	(Belgium) Maxime Martin	5–6	M
(Germany) Callaway Competition	Corvette Z06.R GT3	Chevrolet LS7 7.0 L V8	100	(Netherlands) Marius Ritskes	All	M
(Germany) Callaway Competition	Corvette Z06.R GT3	Chevrolet LS7 7.0 L V8	100	(Netherlands) Bernhard van Oranje	1–4, 6	M
(Germany) Callaway Competition	Corvette Z06.R GT3	Chevrolet LS7 7.0 L V8	100	(Netherlands) Dennis Retera	5	M
(Germany) Callaway Competition	Corvette Z06.R GT3	Chevrolet LS7 7.0 L V8	101	(Germany) Christian Hohenadel	All	M
(Germany) Callaway Competition	Corvette Z06.R GT3	Chevrolet LS7 7.0 L V8	101	(Germany) Daniel Keilwitz	All	M

== Calendar ==
On 23 October 2009, just before the final round of the 2009 season, the FIA World Motor Sport Council announced the 2010 calendar in co-ordinance with the FIA GT1 World Championship.

Round	Race	Circuit	Date	Pole position	Fastest lap	Winner
1	1	(United Kingdom) Silverstone Circuit	1 May	#25 Argo Racing	#25 Argo Racing	#20 Trackspeed
1	1	(United Kingdom) Silverstone Circuit	1 May	(Germany) Philip Geipel (Germany) Ellen Lohr	(Germany) Philip Geipel (Germany) Ellen Lohr	(Spain) Siso Cunill (Germany) Tim Bergmeister
1	2	(United Kingdom) Silverstone Circuit	2 May	#18 Toni Seiler Racing	#25 Argo Racing	#101 Callaway Competition
1	2	(United Kingdom) Silverstone Circuit	2 May	(France) Dino Lunardi (Switzerland) Toni Seiler	(Germany) Philip Geipel (Germany) Ellen Lohr	(Germany) Daniel Keilwitz (Germany) Christian Hohenadel
2	3	(Czech Republic) Masaryk Circuit, Brno	22 May	#24 Argo Racing	#20 Trackspeed	#16 Graff Racing
2	3	(Czech Republic) Masaryk Circuit, Brno	22 May	(Germany) Albert von Thurn und Taxis (Germany) Philip Geipel	(Spain) Siso Cunill (Germany) Tim Bergmeister	(France) Joakim Lambotte (France) Mike Parisy
2	4	(Czech Republic) Masaryk Circuit, Brno	23 May	#87 Chad Racing	#87 Chad Racing	#16 Graff Racing
2	4	(Czech Republic) Masaryk Circuit, Brno	23 May	(Italy) Giacomo Petrobelli (Italy) Diego Alessi	(Italy) Giacomo Petrobelli (Italy) Diego Alessi	(France) Joakim Lambotte (France) Mike Parisy
3	5	Circuito del Jarama, Spain	19 June	#25 Argo Racing	#25 Argo Racing	#3 Team Rosberg
3	5	Circuito del Jarama, Spain	19 June	(Germany) Albert von Thurn und Taxis (Italy) Giorgio Sanna	(Germany) Albert von Thurn und Taxis (Italy) Giorgio Sanna	(Germany) Kenneth Heyer (Austria) Bernd Herdlhofer
3	6	Circuito del Jarama, Spain	20 June	#61 Prospeed Competition	#77 NFS by Schubert Motorsport	#77 NFS by Schubert Motorsport
3	6	Circuito del Jarama, Spain	20 June	(Netherlands) Paul van Splunteren (Germany) Marco Holzer	(Hungary) Csaba Walter (Germany) Claudia Hürtgen	(Hungary) Csaba Walter (Germany) Claudia Hürtgen
4	7	(France) Circuit Paul Ricard	3 July	#101 Callaway Competition	#16 Graff Racing	#101 Callaway Competition
4	7	(France) Circuit Paul Ricard	3 July	(Germany) Daniel Keilwitz (Germany) Christian Hohenadel	(France) Joakim Lambotte (France) Mike Parisy	(Germany) Daniel Keilwitz (Germany) Christian Hohenadel
4	8	(France) Circuit Paul Ricard	4 July	#61 Prospeed Competition	#16 Graff Racing	#101 Callaway Competition
4	8	(France) Circuit Paul Ricard	4 July	(Netherlands) Paul van Splunteren (Germany) Marco Holzer	(France) Joakim Lambotte (France) Mike Parisy	(Germany) Daniel Keilwitz (Germany) Christian Hohenadel
5	9	(Portugal) Autódromo Internacional do Algarve, Portimão	18 September	#101 Callaway Competition	#76 NFS by Schubert Motorsport	#61 Prospeed Competition
5	9	(Portugal) Autódromo Internacional do Algarve, Portimão	18 September	(Germany) Daniel Keilwitz (Germany) Christian Hohenadel	(Sweden) Patrick Söderlund (Sweden) Edward Sandström	(Netherlands) Paul van Splunteren (Germany) Marco Holzer
5	10	(Portugal) Autódromo Internacional do Algarve, Portimão	19 September	#5 Saintéloc Phoenix Racing	#5 Saintéloc Phoenix Racing	#101 Callaway Competition
5	10	(Portugal) Autódromo Internacional do Algarve, Portimão	19 September	(Switzerland) Pierre Hirschi (France) Grégory Guilvert	(Switzerland) Pierre Hirschi (France) Grégory Guilvert	(Germany) Daniel Keilwitz (Germany) Christian Hohenadel
6	11	(Belgium) Circuit Zolder	10 October	#98 Marc VDS Racing Team	#1 Hexis AMR	#76 NFS by Schubert Motorsport
6	11	(Belgium) Circuit Zolder	10 October	(Switzerland) Mathias Beche (Belgium) Eric de Doncker	(France) Frédéric Makowiecki (France) Manuel Rodrigues	(Sweden) Patrick Söderlund (Sweden) Edward Sandström
6	12	(Belgium) Circuit Zolder	10 October	#1 Hexis AMR	#1 Hexis AMR	#61 Prospeed Competition
6	12	(Belgium) Circuit Zolder	10 October	(France) Frédéric Makowiecki (France) Manuel Rodrigues	(France) Frédéric Makowiecki (France) Manuel Rodrigues	(Netherlands) Paul van Splunteren (Germany) Marco Holzer

== Championships ==
The GT3 Championship adopted the new Formula One points system, meaning points were awarded to the top ten finishers in both races.

Year	1st	2nd	3rd	4th	5th	6th	7th	8th	9th	10th
2009	10	8	6	5	4	3	2	1	0	0
2010	25	18	15	12	10	8	6	4	2	1

=== Drivers Championship ===
Pos	Driver	Team	Rnd 1	Rnd 2	Rnd 3	Rnd 4	Rnd 5	Rnd 6	Rnd 7	Rnd 8	Rnd 9	Rnd 10	Rnd 11	Rnd 12	Total
1	(Germany) Daniel Keilwitz	(Germany) Callaway Competition	Ret	1	2	3	2	4	1	1	2	1	9	15	183
1	(Germany) Christian Hohenadel	(Germany) Callaway Competition	Ret	1	2	3	2	4	1	1	2	1	9	15	183
2	(Netherlands) Paul van Splunteren	(Belgium) Prospeed Competition	9	17	21	6	Ret	2	6	3	1	2	2	1	137
2	(Germany) Marco Holzer	(Belgium) Prospeed Competition	9	17	21	6	Ret	2	6	3	1	2	2	1	137
3	(France) Joakim Lambotte	(France) Graff Racing	19	Ret	1	1	DNS	10	2	2	3	21	7	10	108
3	(France) Mike Parisy	(France) Graff Racing	19	Ret	1	1	DNS	10	2	2	3	21	7	10	108
4	(Hungary) Csaba Walter	(Germany) Need for Speed by Schubert Motorsport	6	5	19	16	10	1	5	4	18	6	4	3	101
4	(Germany) Claudia Hürtgen	(Germany) Need for Speed by Schubert Motorsport	6	5	19	16	10	1	5	4	18	6	4	3	101
5	(France) Manuel Rodrigues	(France) Hexis AMR	Ret	2	7	5	Ret	20			20	5	20	2	62
5	(France) Frédéric Makowiecki	(France) Hexis AMR	Ret	2	7	5	Ret	20			20	5	20	2	62
6	(Sweden) Edward Sandström	(Germany) Need for Speed by Schubert Motorsport	DNS	9	18	10	Ret	8	4	22	7	13	1	5	60
6	(Sweden) Patrick Söderlund	(Germany) Need for Speed by Schubert Motorsport	DNS	9	18	10	Ret	8	4	22	7	13	1	5	60
7	(Germany) Philip Geipel	(Belgium) Argo Racing	3	4	4	2	15	Ret							57
8	(France) Gilles Vannelet	(Belgium) Mühlner Motorsport	5	16	20	14	17	5	3	7	8	7	DSQ	7	57
9	(Spain) Siso Cunill	(United Kingdom) Trackspeed	1	3	27	12									52
9	(Spain) Siso Cunill	(Belgium) Argo Racing							9	5					52
10	(Finland) Mikko Eskeleinen	(Germany) Fischer Racing	14	6	12	DNS	6	7	7	11	4	19	8	6	52
11	(Switzerland) Toni Seiler	(Switzerland) Toni Seiler Racing	2	13	3	7	20	13	8	6					51
11	(France) Dino Lunardi	(Switzerland) Toni Seiler Racing	2	13	3	7	20	13	8	6					51
12	(Finland) Petri Lappalainen	(Belgium) Prospeed Competition	11	11	17	8	5	6	23	8	11	9	6	4	48
12	(Finland) Markus Palttala	(Belgium) Prospeed Competition	11	11	17	8	5	6	23	8	11	9	6	4	48
13	(Germany) Albert von Thurn und Taxis	(Belgium) Argo Racing	7	Ret	4	2	7	17	20	13					42
14	(Germany) Tim Bergmeister	(United Kingdom) Trackspeed	1	3											40
15	(Denmark) Christoffer Nygaard	(Germany) Fischer Racing	14	6	12	DNS	6	7	7	11			8	6	40
16	(Germany) Kenneth Heyer	(Germany) Team Rosberg	Ret	21	13	17	1	Ret	Ret	19	5	22	16	20	35
17	(Italy) Diego Alessi	(United Kingdom) Chad Racing	4	Ret	9	15	3	Ret	22	14	9	23			31
17	(Italy) Giacomo Petrobelli	(United Kingdom) Chad Racing	4	Ret	9	15	3	Ret	22	14	9	23			31
18	(Germany) Ellen Lohr	(Belgium) Argo Racing	3	4											27
19	(Austria) Bernd Herdlhofer	(Germany) Team Rosberg			13	17	1	Ret	Ret	19					25
20	(Belgium) Greg Franchi	(France) Saintéloc Phoenix Racing	8	8	10	11	DNS	3							24
20	(Belgium) Greg Franchi	(Belgium) Belgian Audi Club											14	DSQ	24
20	(Belgium) Stéphane Lémeret	(France) Saintéloc Phoenix Racing	8	8	10	11	DNS	3							24
20	(Belgium) Stéphane Lémeret	(Germany) Team Rosberg											14	DSQ	24
21	(France) Antoine Leclerc	(Belgium) Mühlner Motorsport							3	7					21
22	(Republic of Ireland) Seán Paul Breslin	(Germany) Black Falcon	15	10	8	25	4	9	11	9	23	11			21
23	(United Kingdom) Joe Osborne	(Belgium) Mühlner Motorsport	5	16	20	14	17	5							20
24	(United States) Zak Brown	(United States) United Autosports	16	15	25	21	13	DNS	13	23	21	3	17	8	19
24	(United Kingdom) Matthew Bell	(United States) United Autosports	16	15	25	21	13	DNS	13	23	21	3	17	8	19
25	(Belgium) Eric de Doncker	(Belgium) Marc VDS Racing Team			23	20					15	10	3	16	16
25	(Switzerland) Mathias Beche	(Belgium) Marc VDS Racing Team			23	20					15	10	3	16	16
26	(Germany) Christer Jöns	(Germany) Black Falcon					4	9	11	9					16
27	(France) Thomas Accary	(France) Hexis AMR	13	7	6	24	Ret	15	19	Ret	22	15	12	11	14
27	(France) Luc Paillard	(France) Hexis AMR	13	7	6	24	Ret	15	19	Ret	22	15	12	11	14
27	(Italy) Giorgio Sanna	(Belgium) Argo Racing	7	Ret	11	9	7	17							14
28	(Czech Republic) Martin Matzke	(Austria) Team S-Berg Racing			16	4									12
28	(Austria) Nikolas Mayr-Melnhof	(Austria) Team S-Berg Racing			16	4									12
28	(Belgium) Niels Lagrange	(Belgium) Argo Racing							9	5					12
28	(Germany) Florian Gruber	(Germany) Fischer Racing									4	19			12
28	(Belgium) Maxime Martin	(Belgium) Marc VDS Racing Team									DNS	4	15	18	12
28	(France) Gaël Lesoudier	(Belgium) Marc VDS Racing Team									DNS	4	15	18	12
29	(France) Arnaud Vincent	(France) Graff Racing			5	13							19	12	10
29	(France) Arnaud Peyroles	(France) Graff Racing			5	13	11	Ret					19	12	10
29	(France) Grégoire Demoustier	(France) Graff Racing					11	Ret							10
29	(France) Grégoire Demoustier	(Germany) Team Rosberg									5	22			10
29	(Belgium) Armand Fumal	(Belgium) Mühlner Motorsport											5	17	10
29	(Belgium) Jérôme Thiry	(Belgium) Mühlner Motorsport											5	17	10
29	(Austria) Niki Lanik	(Belgium) Mühlner Motorsport									8	7			10
29	(Switzerland) Pierre Hirschi	(France) Saintéloc Phoenix Racing			24	18	16	12	15	12	6	18	11	9	10
29	(France) Grégory Guilvert	(France) Saintéloc Phoenix Racing							15	12	6	18	11	9	10
30	(Germany) Michael Ammermüller	(Germany) Team Rosberg	10	12			8	Ret	10	15	13	20			6
30	(Brazil) Paulo Bonifácio	(Germany) Team Rosberg	10	12			8	Ret	10	15	13	20			6
31	(Germany) Johannes Stuck	(Germany) Black Falcon	15	10	8	25									5
31	(Netherlands) Marius Ritskes	(Germany) Callaway Competition	18	18	22	22	14	16	12	10	14	8	22	19	5
32	(Netherlands) Dennis Retera	(Germany) Callaway Competition									14	8			4
33	(United States) Michael Guasch	(United States) United Autosports	20	14	14	19	12	11	17	18	10	14	10	10	3
33	(United States) Mark Patterson	(United States) United Autosports	20	14	14	19	12	11	17	18	10	14	10	10	3
34	(Germany) Charlie Geipel	(Belgium) Argo Racing			11	9									2
34	(France) Damien Charveriat	(United Kingdom) Chad Racing			26	23	9	14	DNS	16					2
34	(United Kingdom) Charles Hollings	(United Kingdom) Chad Racing			26	23	9	14	DNS	16					2
35	(Netherlands) Bernhard van Oranje	(Germany) Callaway Competition	18	18	22	22	14	16	12	10			22	19	1

=== Teams Championship ===
Pos	Team	Chassis	Engine	Rnd 1	Rnd 2	Rnd 3	Rnd 4	Rnd 5	Rnd 6	Rnd 7	Rnd 8	Rnd 9	Rnd 10	Rnd 11	Rnd 12	Total
1	(Belgium) Prospeed Competition	Porsche 997 GT3-R	Porsche 4.0L Flat-6	8	1	0	18	10	26	8	21	27	20	26	37	202
2	(Germany) Callaway Competition	Corvette Z06.R GT3	Chevrolet LS7 7.0L V8	0	25	18	15	18	12	26	27	18	29	4	0	192
3	(Germany) Need for Speed by Schubert Motorsport	BMW Z4 GT3	BMW 4.0L V8	12	14	0	4	4	31	22	12	10	8	37	25	179
4	(France) Graff Racing	Corvette Z06.R GT3	Chevrolet LS7 7.0L V8	0	0	37	25	2	2	18	18	0	0	6	1	109
5	(Belgium) Argo Racing	Lamborghini Gallardo LP560-4	Lamborghini 5.2L V10	28	12	16	24	0	0	6	10					96
6	(France) Hexis AMR	Aston Martin DBRS9	Aston Martin 6.0L V12	0	26	18	12	0	0	0	0	0	10	0	18	84
7	(Belgium) Mühlner Motorsport	Porsche 997 GT3-R	Porsche 4.0L Flat-6	16	0	0	0	0	10	15	8	8	6	10	8	81
8	(Germany) Team Rosberg	Audi R8 LMS	Audi 5.2L V10	4	0	0	0	33	0	4	0	15	0	0	0	56
9	(France) Saintéloc Phoenix Racing	Audi R8 LMS	Audi 5.2L V10	8	6	2	2	0	15	0	1	12	0	1	4	51
10	(United Kingdom) Trackspeed	Porsche 997 GT3-R	Porsche 4.0L Flat-6	25	15	0	1									41
11	(United Kingdom) Chad Racing	Ferrari 430 Scuderia GT3	Ferrari 4.3L V8	0	0	4	0	21	0	0	0	7	0	0	0	32
12	(United States) United Autosports	Audi R8 LMS	Audi 5.3L V10	0	0	0	0	1	1	0	0	4	15	2	8	31
13	(Germany) Black Falcon	Audi R8 LMS	Audi 5.2L V10	0	2	6	0	12	4	2	4	0	0			30
14	(Belgium) Marc VDS Racing Team	Ford Mustang Marc VDS GT3	Ford 5.3 L V8			0	0	0	0							28
14	(Belgium) Marc VDS Racing Team	Ford GT GT3	Ford Cammer 5.0 L V8									0	13	15	0	28

=== Manufacturer's Cups ===
The Manufacturer Cups were open to any manufacturer who supplied two or more teams in the full season. Points were awarded based on the driver's position within that manufacturer's class.

==== Audi ====
Pos	No	Drivers	Team	Rnd 1	Rnd 2	Rnd 3	Rnd 4	Rnd 5	Rnd 6	Rnd 7	Rnd 8	Rnd 9	Rnd 10	Rnd 11	Rnd 12	Total
1	33	(Republic of Ireland) Seán Paul Breslin	(Germany) Black Falcon	15	18	25	0	18	18	18	25	0	18			155
2	22	(United States) Michael Guasch	(United States) United Autosports	0	12	12	12	12	15	0	12	0	15	25	15	145
2	22	(United States) Mark Patterson	(United States) United Autosports	0	12	12	12	12	15	0	12	0	15	25	15	145
3	6	(Belgium) Greg Franchi	(France) Saintéloc Phoenix Racing	25	25	18	25	0	25							133
3	27	(Belgium) Greg Franchi	(Belgium) Belgian Audi Club											15	0	133
4	6	(Belgium) Stéphane Lémeret	(France) Saintéloc Phoenix Racing	25	25	18	25	0	25							130
4	3	(Belgium) Stéphane Lémeret	(Germany) Team Rosberg					12	0							130
5	5	(Switzerland) Pierre Hirschi	(France) Saintéloc Phoenix Racing	0	0	0	15	0	12	12	18	0	0	18	18	111
6	4	(Brazil) Paulo Bonifácio	(Germany) Team Rosberg	18	15	0	0	15	0	25	15	12	0			100
6	4	(Germany) Michael Ammermüller	(Germany) Team Rosberg	18	15	0	0	15	0	25	15	12	0	0	0	100
7	3	(Germany) Kenneth Heyer	(Germany) Team Rosberg	0	0	15	18	25	0	0	0	25	0	12	0	95
8	23	(United Kingdom) Matthew Bell	(United States) United Autosports	12	0	0	0	0	0	15	0	0	25	0	25	77
8	23	(United States) Zak Brown	(United States) United Autosports	12	0	0	0	0	0	15	0	0	25	0	25	77
9	33	(Austria) Johannes Stuck	(Germany) Black Falcon	15	18	25	0									58
9	3	(Austria) Bernd Herdlhofer	(Germany) Team Rosberg			15	18	25	0	0	0					58
10	5	(France) Grégory Guilvert	(France) Saintéloc Phoenix Racing							0	0	18	0	18	18	54
11	5	(France) Bruce Lorgère-Roux	(France) Sainéloc-Phoenix Racing	0	0	0	15	0	12							51
11	6	(France) Bruce Lorgère-Roux	(France) Sainéloc-Phoenix Racing							0	0	0	12	0	12	51
12	3	(France) Grégoire Demoustier	(Germany) Team Rosberg									25	0			25
12	4	(France) Grégoire Demoustier	(Germany) Team Rosberg											0	0	25
13	6	(France) Jérôme Demay	(France) Saintéloc Phoenix Racing							0	0	0	12	0	12	24
14	33	(Germany) Jan Seyffarth	(Germany) Black Falcon									0	18			18
15	27	(Belgium) Enzo Ide	(Belgium) Belgian Audi Club											15	0	15

==== Corvette ====
Pos	No	Drivers	Team	Rnd 1	Rnd 2	Rnd 3	Rnd 4	Rnd 5	Rnd 6	Rnd 7	Rnd 8	Rnd 9	Rnd 10	Rnd 11	Rnd 12	Total
1	101	(Germany) Christian Hohenadel	(Germany) Callaway Competition	12	25	18	18	25	25	25	25	18	18	18	15	242
1	101	(Germany) Daniel Keilwitz	(Germany) Callaway Competition	12	25	18	18	25	25	25	25	18	18	18	15	242
2	16	(France) Joakim Lambotte	(France) Graff Racing	15	12	25	25	0	18	18	18	15	0	25	25	196
2	16	(France) Mike Parisy	(France) Graff Racing	15	12	25	25	0	18	18	18	15	0	25	25	196
3	18	(Switzerland) Toni Seiler	(Switzerland) Toni Seiler Racing	25	18	15	15	12	15	15	15					130
3	18	(France) Dino Lunardi	(Switzerland) Toni Seiler Racing	25	18	15	15	12	15	15	15					130
4	100	(Netherlands) Marius Ritskes	(Germany) Callaway Competition	18	15	0	0	15	12	12	12	12	15	0	12	123
5	100	(Netherlands) Bernhard van Oranje	(Germany) Callaway Competition	18	15	0	0	15	12	12	12			0	12	96
6	17	(France) Arnaud Peyroles	(France) Graff Racing	0	0	12	12	18	0					0	18	60
7	17	(France) Arnaud Vincent	(France) Graff Racing	0	0	12	12							0	18	42
8	100	(Netherlands) Dennis Retera	(Germany) Callaway Competition									12	15			27

==== Porsche ====
Pos	No	Drivers	Team	Rnd 1	Rnd 2	Rnd 3	Rnd 4	Rnd 5	Rnd 6	Rnd 7	Rnd 8	Rnd 9	Rnd 10	Rnd 11	Rnd 12	Total
1	61	(Netherlands) Paul van Splunteren	(Belgium) Prospeed Competition	15	15	12	25	0	25	18	25	0	25	25	25	235
1	61	(Germany) Marco Holzer	(Belgium) Prospeed Competition	15	15	12	25	0	25	18	25	0	25	25	25	235
2	60	(Finland) Petri Lappalainen	(Belgium) Prospeed Competition	12	18	18	18	25	15	0	15	15	15	15	18	184
2	60	(Finland) Markus Palttala	(Belgium) Prospeed Competition	12	18	18	18	25	15	0	15	15	15	15	18	184
2	11	(France) Gilles Vannelet	(Belgium) Mühlner Motorsport	18	12	15	12	15	18	25	18	18	18	0	15	184
3	11	(United Kingdom) Joe Osborne	(Belgium) Mühlner Motorsport	18	12	15	12	15	18							90
4	12	(Germany) Jürgen Häring	(Belgium) Mühlner Motorsport	0	0	25	0	18	0	0	0	12	12			67
5	20	(Spain) Siso Cunill	(United Kingdom) Trackspeed	25	25	0	15									65
6	4	(Germany) Tim Bergmeister	(United Kingdom) Trackspeed	25	25											50
7	11	(France) Antoine Leclerc	(Belgium) Mühlner Motorsport							25	18					43
8	11	(Austria) Niki Lanik	(Belgium) Mühlner Motorsport									18	18			36
9	12	(Belgium) Armand Fumal	(Belgium) Mühlner Motorsport											18	12	30
9	12	(Belgium) Jérôme Thiry	(Belgium) Mühlner Motorsport											18	12	30
10	12	(France) Kevin Éstre	(Belgium) Mühlner Motorsport	0	0	25	0									25
11	12	(Greece) Dimitrios Konstantinou	(Belgium) Mühlner Motorsport							0	0	12	12			24
12	12	(Germany) Philip Geipel	(Belgium) Mühlner Motorsport					18	0							18
13	11	(France) Raymond Narac	(Belgium) Mühlner Motorsport											0	15	15
14	20	(United Kingdom) Phil Keen	(United Kingdom) Trackspeed			0	15									15

== See also ==
- 2010 24 Hours of Spa

== Bibliography ==
- Loisy, Olivier (2010). FIA GT1 World Championship + FIA GT3 + GT2 Cup: 2010 Yearbook. Paris: Apollo Publishing. ISBN 978-2952104487.
