= Patrick Söderlund =

Swedish businessman and video game executive

- Born: Robert Patrick Söderlund; 27 September 1973 (age 53); Stockholm, Sweden
- Known for: CEO of Embark Studios, Former Chief Design Officer of Electronic Arts

Robert Patrick Söderlund is a Swedish businessman and video game executive.

== Career ==
Söderlund served as CEO of DICE, a Swedish video game development company that created the Battlefield series of games, which was acquired by Electronic Arts (EA) in 2006. As of August 2016, he is reported to own approximately US$11 million of EA shares.

He was executive vice president in charge of Worldwide Studios at EA, overseeing all game production. He later became their chief design officer. Söderlund announced he would be leaving EA after twelve years on 14 August 2018.

In November 2018, Söderlund was announced as the CEO of Embark Studios. The studio subsequently released The Finals (2023) and ARC Raiders (2025).

In February 2026, he was appointed as the executive chairman of Nexon.
