= Siso Cunill =

Anglo-Spanish former racing driver (born 1990)

- Nationality: (Spain) Spanish
- Full name: Josep Lluis Cunill Gomez
- Born: October 20, 1990 (age 36) Mountain View, California, U.S.

Porsche Supercup career
- Debut season: 2009
- Current team: Konrad Motorsport
- Car number: 2
- Starts: 14
- Best finish: 6th in 2009

Previous series
- 2006-07 2006 2008 2008 2008 2010: Spanish F3 Championship; Belgian Formula Renault 1.6; Italian Formula Renault 2.0; Eurocup Formula Renault 2.0; Formula Renault 3.5 Series; FIA GT3 European Championship

Josep Lluis Cunill Gomez (Note: In this Spanish name, the first or paternal surname is Cunill and the second or maternal family name is Gomez.) (born October 20, 1990, in Mountain View, California) is an Anglo-Spanish former professional racing driver, who raced professionally under the name "Siso" Cunill.

Cunill began his racing career in 2006, driving in the Copa de España class of the Spanish Formula Three Championship. In the six races he competed in, he took three class podiums to finish sixth in the standings. He also participated in selected races of the Belgian Formula Renault 1.6 championship, scoring a single championship point.

For 2007, Cunill took part in a full Spanish F3 season, driving for GTA Motor Competicion. Over the course of the year, he took one podium place (in the final round at Barcelona) and three further points scoring positions to finish 14th in the championship.

In 2008, Cunill entered both the Eurocup Formula Renault 2.0 and Italian Formula Renault 2.0 championships, driving for Swiss team Jenzer Motorsport. In the six Eurocup races he contested his best result was a sixth place at Spa-Francorchamps, whilst in the Italian series he finished in the points in eight of his ten races, with his best result also being a sixth-place finish.

In August 2008, Cunill made his debut in the Formula Renault 3.5 Series with the KTR team after both of their regular drivers, Guillaume Moreau and Daniil Move, left the team. Despite only qualifying 23rd, he scored points in his debut race at the Nürburgring, finishing in tenth place after post-race penalties were handed to both Fairuz Fauzy and Esteban Guerrieri.

From 2009 to 2010, Cunill drove for Konrad Motorsport in the Porsche Supercup.

== Career results ==
=== Karting ===
(1999)

- 3rd Classified Catalan Championship, Category Youngsters.

(2000)

- Champion Championship Catalunya, Category Youngsters.
- Champion Arisco Championship Trophy, Category Youngsters.
- Resistance Catalan Cup Finalist, Category Youngsters.

(2001)

- Runner Up Championship Catalunya cadet category.
- Champion Trophy Championship Arisco, cadet category.
- 5th Championship in Spain, Category Cadet.

(2002)

- Runner Up Championship Catalunya cadet category.
- 4th Championship of Spain, Category Cadet.

(2003)

- 4th Championship of Catalunya, Category Junior.

=== Formula ===
Season	Series	Team	Races	Wins	Poles	F/Laps	Podiums	Points	Position
2006	Spanish F3 Championship	GTA Motor	6	0	0	?	3	23	6th
2006	Belgian Formula Renault 1.6	?	5	0	0	?	0	1	21st
2007	Spanish F3 Championship	GTA Motor	16	0	0	0	1	19	14th
2008	Italian Formula Renault 2.0	Jenzer Motorsport	10	0	0	0	0	96	13th
2008	Eurocup Formula Renault 2.0	Jenzer Motorsport	6	0	0	0	0	5	22nd
2008	Formula Renault 3.5 Series	KTR	6	0	0	0	0	1	30th
2009	Porsche Supercup	Konrad Motorsport	13	0	0	0	0	73	11th
2009	Porsche Carrera Cup Germany	Konrad Motorsport	2	0	0	0	1	16	24th
2010	Porsche Supercup	Konrad Motorsport	4	0	0	0	0	3	13th

== Racing record ==
=== Complete Eurocup Formula Renault 2.0 results ===
(key) (Races in bold indicate pole position; races in italics indicate fastest lap)

Year	Entrant	1	2	3	4	5	6	7	8	9	10	11	12	13	14	DC	Points
2008	Jenzer Motorsport	SPA; 1 Ret	SPA; 2; 6	SIL; 1; 12	SIL; 2; 13	HUN; 1 Ret	HUN; 2; 17	NÜR; 1	NÜR; 2	LMS; 1	LMS; 2	EST; 1	EST; 2	CAT; 1	CAT; 2	22nd	5

=== Complete Formula Renault 3.5 Series results ===
(key) (Races in bold indicate pole position) (Races in italics indicate fastest lap)

Year	Team	1	2	3	4	5	6	7	8	9	10	11	12	13	14	15	16	17	Pos	Points
2008	KTR	MNZ; 1	MNZ; 2	SPA; 1	SPA; 2	MON; 1	SIL; 1	SIL; 2	HUN; 1	HUN; 2	NÜR; 1; 10	NÜR; 2 NC	LMS; 1; 18	LMS; 2 Ret	EST; 1; 17	EST; 2; 18	CAT; 1; 15	CAT; 2 Ret	30th	1

=== Complete Porsche Supercup results ===
(key) (Races in bold indicate pole position – 2 points awarded 2008 onwards in all races) (Races in italics indicate fastest lap)

Year	Team	Car	1	2	3	4	5	6	7	8	9	10	11	12	13	DC	Points
2009	Konrad Motorsport	Porsche 997 GT3	BHR; 8	BHR; NC	ESP; Ret	MON; 12	TUR; 9	GBR; 13	GER; 14	HUN; 6	ESP; 8	BEL; 15	ITA; 10	UAE; 10	UAE; Ret	11th	73
2010	Konrad Motorsport	Porsche 997 GT3	BHR; 14	BHR; Ret	ESP; Ret	MON	ESP; DSQ	GBR	GER	HUN	BEL	ITA				22nd	3
