= 2010 Porsche Supercup =

18th Porsche Supercup season

The 2010 Porsche Mobil 1 Supercup season was the 18th Porsche Supercup season. It began on 13 March in Bahrain, and finished on 12 September at Monza, after ten races. Once again, the series was on the support package of the Formula One World Championship at all European rounds except Turkey.

The series was won by German René Rast, who won four out of first five races. Briton Nick Tandy was a runner-up with three wins.

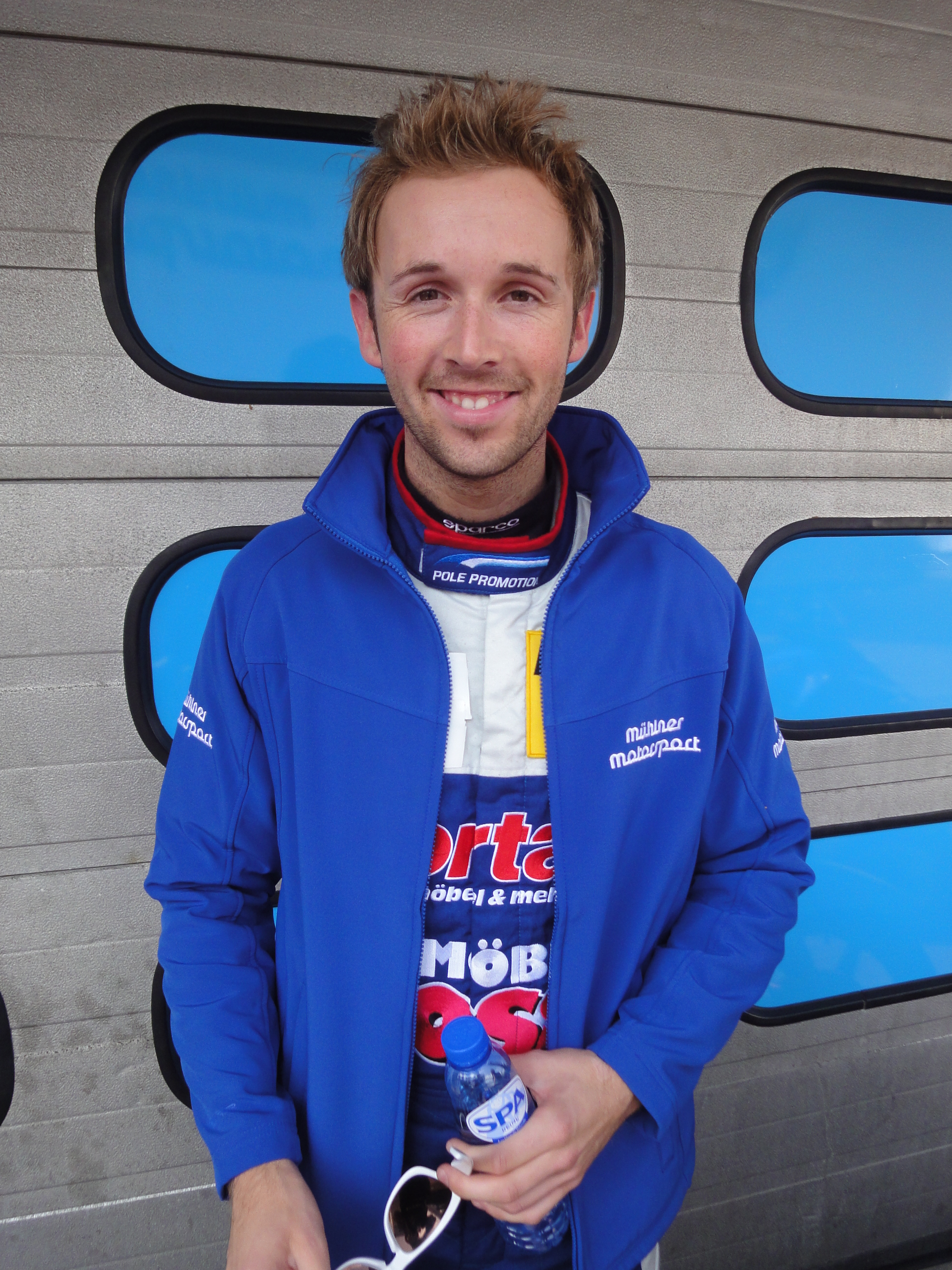
René Rast (pictured in 2010) won his first Drivers' Championship title

== Teams and drivers ==
Team	No.	Drivers	Rounds
(Austria) Konrad Motorsport	1	(United Kingdom) Nick Tandy	All
(Austria) Konrad Motorsport	2	(Spain) Siso Cunill	1–2, 4
(Austria) Konrad Motorsport	2	(Switzerland) Raffi Bader	6, 8
(Austria) Konrad Motorsport	2	(Italy) Fabrizio del Monte	9
(Austria) Konrad Motorsport	21	(Netherlands) Patrick Huisman	All
(Austria) Lechner Racing	3	(Italy) Alessandro Zampedri	All
(Austria) Lechner Racing	4	(Slovakia) Štefan Rosina	All
(Austria) Lechner Racing	30	(Bahrain) Salman Al Khalifa	1
(Germany) Schnabl Engineering Parker Racing	5	(Republic of Ireland) Niall Breen	1
(Germany) Schnabl Engineering Parker Racing	5	(Austria) Martin Ragginger	6
(Germany) Schnabl Engineering Parker Racing	5	(United States) Brian Wong	8–9
(Germany) Schnabl Engineering Parker Racing	6	(United Kingdom) Tim Bridgman	All
(Germany) Schnabl Engineering Parker Racing	24	(Germany) Thomas Messer	2–9
(Germany) Schnabl Engineering Parker Racing	36	(Italy) Francesco Castellacci	4
(Germany) Schnabl Engineering Parker Racing	37	(Germany) Jörg Hardt	6
(Germany) Sanitec Giltrap Racing	7	(United States) William Langhorne	All
(Germany) Sanitec Giltrap Racing	8	(New Zealand) Matt Halliday	1–8
(Germany) Sanitec Giltrap Racing	8	(Italy) Francesco Castellacci	9
(Germany) Sanitec Giltrap Racing	22	(Germany) Christian Engelhart	1–4, 6, 8–9
(Germany) Sanitec Giltrap Racing	22	(Italy) Francesco Castellacci	5
(Poland) VERVA Racing Team	9	(Poland) Robert Lukas	All
(Poland) VERVA Racing Team	10	(Poland) Kuba Giermaziak	All
(Netherlands) Bleekemolen Harders Plaza Racing	11	(Netherlands) Sebastiaan Bleekemolen	All
(Netherlands) Bleekemolen Harders Plaza Racing	12	(Netherlands) Robert van den Berg	All
(Netherlands) Bleekemolen Harders Plaza Racing	23	(Netherlands) Jaap van Lagen	2–9
(Germany) Veltins MRS Racing	14	(Germany) Jan Seyffarth	All
(Germany) Veltins MRS Racing	15	(Austria) Norbert Siedler	All
(Saudi Arabia) Al Faisal Lechner Racing	16	(Germany) René Rast	All
(Saudi Arabia) Al Faisal Lechner Racing	17	(Netherlands) Jeroen Bleekemolen	1–4, 7, 9
(Saudi Arabia) Al Faisal Lechner Racing	17	(Republic of Ireland) Damien Faulkner	5
(Saudi Arabia) Al Faisal Lechner Racing	17	(France) Nicolas Armindo	6, 8
(Saudi Arabia) Al Faisal Lechner Racing	31	(Saudi Arabia) Abdulaziz Al Faisal	1–3
(Saudi Arabia) Al Faisal Lechner Racing	31	(France) Nicolas Armindo	9
(United Arab Emirates) Team Abu Dhabi by Tolimit	18	(Germany) Sascha Maassen	All
(United Arab Emirates) Team Abu Dhabi by Tolimit	19	(United Kingdom) Sean Edwards	All
(United Arab Emirates) Team Abu Dhabi by Tolimit	20	(United Arab Emirates) Khaled Al Qubaisi	All
(Bahrain) GT3 Cup Challenge Middle East	32	(Bahrain) Fahad Algosaibi	1
(Bahrain) GT3 Cup Challenge Middle East	33	(Saudi Arabia) Bandar Alesayi	1
(Italy) Antonelli Motorsport	34	(Italy) Angelo Proietti	3
(Italy) Antonelli Motorsport	34	(Italy) Christian Passuti	8–9
(Italy) Antonelli Motorsport	35	(Italy) Christian Passuti	3
(Italy) Antonelli Motorsport	35	(Italy) Davide Roda	8–9
(Italy) Antonelli Motorsport	39	(Italy) Angelo Proietti	9
(Italy) Petricorse Motorsport	36	(Italy) Vito Postiglione	9
(Italy) Petricorse Motorsport	37	(Italy) Lorenzo Bontempelli	9
Konrad Motorsport Austria	38	(Germany) Peter Scharmach	8
(Italy) Ebimotors	40	(Italy) Alessandro Balzan	9
(Italy) Ebimotors	41	(Italy) Alex Frassineti	9
(Germany) Porsche AG	90	(United Kingdom) Michael Meadows	5
(Germany) Porsche AG	90	(Austria) Mathias Lauda	6
(Germany) Porsche AG	90	(Hungary) Csaba Walter	7
(Germany) Porsche AG	90	(Belgium) Nico Verdonck	8
(Germany) Porsche AG	90	(New Zealand) Jono Lester	9
(Germany) Porsche AG	91	(United Kingdom) Euan Hankey	5

== Race calendar and results ==
- The calendar was announced on 4 December 2009.

Round		Circuit	Country	Date	Pole position	Fastest lap	Winning driver	Winning team
1	R1	Bahrain International Circuit	Bahrain	13 March	(Germany) René Rast	(Austria) Norbert Siedler	(Germany) René Rast	(Austria) Al Faisal Lechner Racing
1	R2	Bahrain International Circuit	Bahrain	14 March	(Germany) René Rast	(Germany) René Rast	(Germany) René Rast	(Austria) Al Faisal Lechner Racing
2		(Spain) Circuit de Catalunya	Spain	9 May	(Netherlands) Jeroen Bleekemolen	(United Kingdom) Sean Edwards	(Austria) Norbert Siedler	(Germany) Veltins MRS Racing
3		Circuit de Monaco	Monaco	16 May	(Germany) René Rast	(United Kingdom) Nick Tandy	(Germany) René Rast	(Austria) Al Faisal Lechner Racing
4		(Spain) Valencia Street Circuit	Spain	27 June	(Germany) René Rast	(Germany) René Rast	(Germany) René Rast	(Austria) Al Faisal Lechner Racing
5		(United Kingdom) Silverstone Circuit	United Kingdom	11 July	(United Kingdom) Nick Tandy	(United Kingdom) Nick Tandy	(United Kingdom) Nick Tandy	(Austria) Konrad Motorsport
6		(Germany) Hockenheimring	Germany	25 July	(France) Nicolas Armindo	(Netherlands) Jaap van Lagen	(France) Nicolas Armindo	(Austria) Al Faisal Lechner Racing
7		(Hungary) Hungaroring	Hungary	1 August	(United Kingdom) Nick Tandy	(United Kingdom) Nick Tandy	(United Kingdom) Nick Tandy	(Austria) Konrad Motorsport
8		(Belgium) Circuit de Spa-Francorchamps	Belgium	29 August	(United Kingdom) Sean Edwards	(United Kingdom) Sean Edwards	(United Kingdom) Sean Edwards	(United Arab Emirates) Team Abu Dhabi by Tolimit
9		(Italy) Autodromo Nazionale Monza	Italy	12 September	(United Kingdom) Nick Tandy	(Italy) Angelo Proietti	(United Kingdom) Nick Tandy	(Austria) Konrad Motorsport

== Championship standings ==
Pos	Driver	BHR (Bahrain)		CAT (Spain)	MON (Monaco)	VAL (Spain)	SIL (United Kingdom)	HOC (Germany)	HUN (Hungary)	SPA (Belgium)	MZA (Italy)	Points
1	(Germany) René Rast	**1**	**1**	Ret	**1**	**1**	2	Ret	3	3	4	152
2	(United Kingdom) Nick Tandy	4	3	5	2	8	**1**	Ret ^{‡}	**1**	6	**1**	146
3	(Austria) Norbert Siedler	23	5	1	12	2	4	6	Ret	16	3	98
4	(Netherlands) Jaap van Lagen			4	3	4	6	5	5	2	Ret	98
5	(Germany) Jan Seyffarth	3	11	6	18	11	9	2	8	4	5	97
6	(United Kingdom) Sean Edwards	8	15	12	10	5	12	19	2	**1**	2	95
7	(Netherlands) Jeroen Bleekemolen	5	2	**3**	6	3			4		20	92
8	(Slovakia) Štefan Rosina	2	4	8	4	6	7	4	Ret	17	Ret	90
9	(Netherlands) Patrick Huisman	19	12	2	7	7	3	10	7	24	9	82
10	(Poland) Kuba Giermaziak	12	14	DSQ	13	13	5	15	6	7	10	56
11	(Germany) Christian Engelhart	6	23	9	9	14		3		9	22	54
12	(Germany) Sascha Maassen	7	9	11	19	9	13	12	9	26†	12	52
13	(New Zealand) Matt Halliday	Ret	6	Ret	8	12	8	9	Ret	8		48
14	(Italy) Alessandro Zampedri	9	7	Ret	5	17	20†	11	Ret	12	15	46
15	(United Kingdom) Tim Bridgman	11	8	7	11	Ret	21†	13	10	11	Ret	45
16	(Netherlands) Sebastiaan Bleekemolen	17	10	Ret	15	10	22†	8	Ret	Ret	8	35
17	(Poland) Robert Lukas	10	20	10	17	15	11	DSQ	11	15	Ret	27
18	(United States) William Langhorne	16	16	13	16	Ret	16	14	Ret	13	14	25
19	(Germany) Thomas Messer			16	Ret	19	18	17	15	20	21	10
20	(Netherlands) Robert van den Berg	DNS	18	17	21	Ret	Ret	18	13	14	Ret	9
21	(United Arab Emirates) Khaled Al Qubaisi	20	21	14	22	18	19	21	14	23	Ret	6
22	(Spain) Siso Cunill	14	Ret	Ret		DSQ						3
23	(Republic of Ireland) Niall Breen	18	Ret									0
guest drivers ineligible for championship points
–	(France) Nicolas Armindo							**1**		5	7	0
–	(Italy) Alessandro Balzan										6	0
–	(Austria) Martin Ragginger							7				0
–	(Republic of Ireland) Damien Faulkner						10					0
–	(Belgium) Nico Verdonck									10		0
–	(Italy) Alex Frassineti										11	0
–	(Hungary) Csaba Walter								12			0
–	(Bahrain) Salman Al Khalifa	13	13									0
–	(New Zealand) Jono Lester										13	0
–	(Italy) Christian Passuti				14					18	Ret	0
–	(United Kingdom) Michael Meadows						14					0
–	(Saudi Arabia) Abdulaziz Al Faisal	15	17	15	20							0
–	(Italy) Francesco Castellacci					16	15				18	0
–	(Switzerland) Raffi Bader							16		25		0
–	(Italy) Lorenzo Bontempelli										16	0
–	(Italy) Davide Roda									21	17	0
–	(United Kingdom) Euan Hankey						17					0
–	(Saudi Arabia) Bandar Alesayi	21	19									0
–	(Italy) Fabrizio del Monte										19	0
–	(Germany) Peter Scharmach									19		0
–	(Austria) Mathias Lauda							20				0
–	(Bahrain) Fahad Algosaibi	22	22									0
–	(United States) Brian Wong									22	Ret	0
–	(Italy) Angelo Proietti				23						23†	0
–	(Germany) Jörg Hardt							Ret				0
–	(Italy) Vito Postiglione										DSQ	0
Pos	Driver	BHR (Bahrain)		CAT (Spain)	MON (Monaco)	VAL (Spain)	SIL (United Kingdom)	HOC (Germany)	HUN (Hungary)	SPA (Belgium)	MZA (Italy)	Points

Colour	Result
Gold	Winner
Silver	Second place
Bronze	Third place
Green	Points classification
Blue	Non-points classification
Blue	Non-classified finish (NC)
Purple	Retired, not classified (Ret)
Red	Did not qualify (DNQ)
Red	Did not pre-qualify (DNPQ)
Black	Disqualified (DSQ)
White	Did not start (DNS)
White	Withdrew (WD)
White	Race cancelled (C)
Blank	Did not practice (DNP)
Blank	Did not arrive (DNA)
Blank	Excluded (EX)

**Bold** – Pole
Italics – Fastest Lap

† — Drivers did not finish the race, but were classified as they completed over 90% of the race distance.

^{‡} Nick Tandy was awarded the two points for pole position in Germany after qualifying second behind guest driver Nicolas Armindo, who was ineligible to collect points.

Position	1st	2nd	3rd	4th	5th	6th	7th	8th	9th	10th	11th	12th	13th	14th	15th	Pole	Ref
Points	20	18	16	14	12	10	9	8	7	6	5	4	3	2	1	2	
