= ARC Raiders =

2025 video game

- Developer: Embark Studios
- Publisher: Embark Studios
- Composers: Patrik Andrén; Johan Söderqvist
- Engine: Unreal Engine 5
- Platforms: PlayStation 5; Windows; Xbox Series X/S
- Release: October 30, 2025
- Genre: Extraction shooter
- Mode: Multiplayer

ARC Raiders is a 2025 multiplayer extraction shooter developed and published by Embark Studios. It was released on October 30, 2025 for the platforms PlayStation 5, Windows and Xbox Series X/S, built on the game engine Unreal Engine 5. It can be played solo, or in teams of two or three.

The game has received generally favorable reviews from critics, and it was awarded Best Multiplayer Game at The Game Awards 2025, Online Game of the Year at the 29th Annual D.I.C.E. Awards, and Best Multiplayer at the 22nd British Academy Games Awards.

== Gameplay ==
In ARC Raiders, players may choose to fight hostile robots and other human players.

ARC Raiders is an extraction shooter played from a third-person perspective. Players leave the underground base (named Speranza) and search for items on the planet's surface for up to 30 minutes, some map conditions extend this to 40 minutes e.g. Hidden Bunker and Locked Gate. During the raid they will encounter hostile NPC robots (known as "ARC"), along with other human players. When a player is killed, they will lose any equipment and materials they have collected, except loot stored in a safe pocket, and return to base. Players can escape via extraction elevators, metro stations and air shafts or use raider hatches (safer extraction points that require keys to be opened) to return to base when they are done collecting loot.

After returning to the Speranza, players can sell items, upgrade their character perks and skills, buy items, or craft weapons and items to prepare for the next raid. Players can engage in quests with the game's various vendors; these usually entail seeking out special items or visiting locations while on the surface.

When entering a match alone, the matchmaking system generally adjusts to place the player against other solo players, making fair and balanced possible player-versus-player (PvP) encounters common, yet not guaranteed. On November 12, 2025, a similar update was deployed for players playing in groups of two. On January 27, 2026, an update was deployed to add a matchmaking option for solo players, allowing them to join the queue for groups of three in return for higher rewards.

== Setting ==
ARC Raiders takes place on Earth in the year 2180. Decades earlier, hostile machines of unknown origin, called "ARC" after the telltale shape of their radar signatures, descended from outer space and began attacking humanity. After years of warfare, surviving humans were forced underground to avoid extermination, using the surface to collect resources that can be sold, dismantled or used to craft gear. One human safe haven is Toledo, a makeshift subterranean city that consists of a network of autonomous communities or "contradas" located beneath a region known as the Rust Belt in post-apocalyptic Italy (although the game's world map is based upon real-life Tenerife). The player is a "raider" from Speranza, one of Toledo's contradas. Raiders are individuals who voluntarily go above ground, referred to as "Topside", during periods of low ARC activity in order to scavenge resources, such as goods from the old world and components from downed ARC machines, to sell, trade, and keep Speranza functioning. Although raiders are encouraged to cooperate, raiding is unregulated and some raiders choose to hunt and steal from each other.

== Development and release ==
ARC Raiders is developed by The Finals developer Embark Studios. It is produced by Aleksander Grøndal. Nexon, Embark Studios' parent company, performed market analysis for Steam prior to release and determined policies for how to maintain the userbase.

The game was officially announced at The Game Awards 2021 as a free-to-play "cooperative third-person shooter". It was revealed in 2023 that the genre of the game had been changed to a PvPvE extraction shooter. Later in 2023 Embark launched a first playtest in the form of a closed Alpha with strict NDA. The game uses Unreal Engine 5. The game resurfaced in 2024, with Embark launching a new public playtest known as "ARC Raiders Tech Test" on October 24 and "ARC Raiders Tech Test 2" on April 30, 2025, with Embark Studios announcing that the game was dropping its free-to-play model and would be available for purchase at $40 on release. Embark Studios conducted a "Server Slam" from October 17 to 20, allowing players to test a portion of the game for free before the final release.

The game was released on October 30, 2025, for Windows, PlayStation 5 and Xbox Series X/S. ARC Raiders has since received several major patches, with 1.26.0 launching on April 28, 2026. Patches have primarily focused on bug fixes, resolving gameplay exploits, and balance.

In May 2026, Embark Studios announced that ARC Raiders would move to a bi-annual schedule for major content updates, beginning with the planned Frozen Trail update in October 2026.

== Reception ==
=== Critical reception ===
Reception

Aggregate scores
Aggregator	Score
Metacritic	(PC) 86/100 (Note: Based on 63 reviews) (PS5) 85/100 (Note: Based on 22 reviews) (XSXS) 88/100 (Note: Based on 9 reviews)
OpenCritic	92% recommend

Review scores
Publication	Score
Destructoid	9/10
Eurogamer	2/5
Game Informer	9/10
GameSpot	9/10
GamesRadar+	4.5/5
Hardcore Gamer	4.5/5
IGN	9/10
PC Gamer (US)	86/100
Push Square	9/10

ARC Raiders received "generally favorable" reviews according to review aggregator website Metacritic Review aggregator OpenCritic reported that 92% of critics recommend the game.

Destructoid's Scott Duwe called the game "simultaneously one of the most technically impressive games of 2025 and one that genre veterans and newbies alike can find a ton of fun in." Alex Van Aken review on Game Informer concluded that "Despite my misgivings, I hold the human-made experience of Arc Raiders in high regard. Its creators have made an intriguing world full of curiosities and payoffs. Nearly every match yields a memorable sequence: an unexpected encounter, a dramatic escape, a hilarious interaction, or a tragic end. While casual gamers may find its harsh consequences frustrating, Arc Raiders provides an impressive setting and format for multiplayer fans seeking excellent engagements and novel interactions." Mark Delaney for GameSpot said that the game "...is an extraction shooter unlike any other, a totally unpredictable, immersive, thrilling story generator directed by the community." James Nouch's summary on GamesRadar was "By sanding down some of the roughest edges of the genre, Arc Raiders delivers an extraction experience that manages to be approachable while still being palpably tense, incredibly dramatic, and occasionally kinda heartwarming. If you're new to the genre, this is the place to start."

The closing comments with Cory Wells for Hardcore Gamer were "No extraction shooter stands out as much as ARC Raiders. The game can seem overwhelming at first as there isn't much direction, and the user interface feels like it's meant for a mouse and keyboard and not a controller. Once you leave Speranza and hop into the world, experience the atmosphere and the gunplay while meeting some people along the way, however, the experience quickly gets up to speed. If you're going solo, it's worth matchmaking and finding someone to lean on for certain things. The user interface offers small font with no direction and you'll miss key elements. The game runs and looks spectacular and offers a soundtrack that isn't from this universe. If you haven't tried an extraction adventure/shooter before and missed the boat on Helldivers 2, this is the one to get into." The verdict Travis Northup for IGN wrote was "With polished gunplay and an irresistible grind, ARC Raiders sets a new standard for extraction shooters." Writing for PC Gamer, Elie Gould said that the game "...is a genuinely enjoyable extraction shooter thanks to interesting weapons, beautiful maps, and unpredictable, action-packed PvPvE encounters." "ARC Raiders has well and truly been worth the wait. This is a phenomenal showcase of what immersive multiplayer can be. Every run is different, and your squad will come out with stories to tell each time. It can be tougher on those planning to play solo, and the extraction loop won't be for everyone. But as far as extraction shooters go, this is one of the most accessible, and it respects your time, giving you a fun experience from your first match. We can easily say that ARC Raiders is one of the best multiplayer games this generation." was Aaron Bayne's conclusion for Push Square.

=== Sales ===
Concurrent players count on Steam reached 250,000 on its launch day. By November 10, 2025, the concurrent player count had reached over 700,000 across all platforms, according to the developer. By November 11, 2025, ARC Raiders had sold over four million copies worldwide. The game had sold 14 million copies worldwide by February 2026.

=== AI use ===
In Eurogamer's review of ARC Raiders, Rick Lane criticized the game's use of artificial intelligence (AI) for text-to-speech, stating the "generated voice lines" for non-player characters are mediocre. Embark Studios previously received similar criticism for their use of AI voices in The Finals. Some fans accused the developer of attempting to replace voice actors with this technology, while others were more open to it.

Embark Studios denied the use of generative AI, saying the game uses audio recorded by hired voice actors and text-to-speech as part of their contract. The CEO of Embark Studios' parent company, Nexon, emphasized the value of human creativity while noting "it's important to assume that every game company is now using AI." The latter statement has resulted in several indie developers noting the lack of AI in their games. Arrowhead CEO Shams Jorjani found ARC Raiders' use of AI to generate players' voices to be helpful to people reluctant to use their own voice.

In a March 2026 interview with GameIndustry.biz, Embark Studios' CEO Patrick Söderlund said some existing AI voice lines were re-recorded with human actors after the game's release, citing the noticeable quality difference.

=== Awards ===
Year	Award	Category	Result	Ref.
2025	The Game Awards	Best Multiplayer Game	Won	
2025	The Steam Awards	Game of the Year	Nominated	
2025	The Steam Awards	Most Innovative Gameplay	Won	
2026	D.I.C.E. Awards	Game of the Year	Nominated	
2026	D.I.C.E. Awards	Action Game of the Year	Nominated	
2026	D.I.C.E. Awards	Online Game of the Year	Won	
2026	D.I.C.E. Awards	Outstanding Achievement in Audio Design	Nominated	
2026	D.I.C.E. Awards	Outstanding Achievement in Game Design	Nominated	
2026	D.I.C.E. Awards	Outstanding Technical Achievement	Nominated	
2026	British Academy Games Awards	Best Game	Nominated	
2026	British Academy Games Awards	Audio Achievement	Nominated	
2026	British Academy Games Awards	Multiplayer	Won	
2026	British Academy Games Awards	Music	Longlisted	
2026	British Academy Games Awards	New Intellectual Property	Nominated	
2026	British Academy Games Awards	Technical Achievement	Nominated	
2026	Golden Joystick Awards	Best Multiplayer	Nominated	
2026	The Game Awards	Best Ongoing Game	Pending	

== Other media ==
On October 5, 2026, Nexon announced Embark Studios' ARC Raider and The Finals would get adapted for television and film by Chernin Entertainment.
