= Embark Studios =

Swedish video game studio

Embark Studios AB
- Type: Subsidiary
- Industry: Video games
- Founded: November 8, 2018; 7 years ago
- Headquarters: Stockholm, Sweden
- Key people: Patrick Söderlund (CEO)
- Products: The Finals; ARC Raiders
- Number of employees: 350 (2025)
- Parent: Nexon Co., Ltd. (2021–present)
- Website: www.embark-studios.com

Embark Studios AB is a Swedish video game developer based in Stockholm and founded in 2018. Its founders include former DICE employees Magnus Nordin, Rob Runesson, Stefan Strandberg, Patrick Söderlund, Jenny Huldschiner and Johan Andersson. Embark has been a subsidiary of the South Korean video game publisher Nexon since 2021. The company is most known for developing The Finals and ARC Raiders.

== History ==
Embark Studios was founded in November 2018 by Patrick Söderlund, the former CEO of DICE and Chief Design Officer at Electronic Arts. Söderlund left DICE in August the same year, after nearly two decades with the company, where he had been a key figure in the development and direction of franchises such as Battlefield, Star Wars Battlefront and Mirror's Edge. The studio was established in Stockholm with a small team, many of whom also had backgrounds at DICE. The studio placed emphasis on procedural content, player collaboration, and emerging tools such as machine learning and cloud computing. In late 2018, shortly after the company was formed, South Korean publisher Nexon became the majority stakeholder in Embark controlling a stake of 66.1% in the company. In 2021, Nexon completed the full acquisition of Embark Studios, integrating it as a subsidiary while allowing it to operate with a degree of autonomy.

By 2019, the team had grown to around 50 people. Söderlund shared the details of the studio's first project in February 2019, revealing that it will be a free-to-play cooperative action game. The game was officially revealed in 2021 as ARC Raiders. However, the development of another project, The Finals (codenamed Project Discovery at the time), progressed faster than ARC Raiders, prompting the team to release that project first. The Finals, a first-person shooter with a heavy emphasis on destructible environment, was released in December 2023. As a free-to-play game, it attracted more than 10 million players in its first two weeks of release. ARC Raiders was subsequently redesigned as a PvPvE extraction shooter and released in October 2025 as a paid game. It was a commercial success, with the game selling more than 12 million copies and reaching 960,000 concurrent players. Its release also marked the biggest launch for a Nexon video game. While both games received generally positive reviews, Embark Studios faced criticism over its use of Text-to-Speech voiceovers.

The studio is currently developing two unannounced projects.

=== Headquarters ===
The studio headquarters began in an old bank building called Södra Bankohuset which was built in the 17th century for the Swedish central bank. In August 2020 the studio moved to a new location called Bankpalatset approximately 1km from the first location. The interior of their current studio was designed by the studio themselves using Blender in collaboration with architects.

== Games developed ==
Year	Title	Platform
2023	The Finals	Windows, PlayStation 5, Xbox Series X/S
2025	ARC Raiders	Windows, PlayStation 5, Xbox Series X/S
