= The Finals =

2023 video game

- Developer: Embark Studios
- Publisher: Embark Studios
- Director: Gustav Tilleby
- Engine: Unreal Engine 5
- Platform: Microsoft Windows Xbox Series X/S PlayStation 5
- Release: Windows, Xbox Series X/S, PlayStation 5; December 7, 2023; PlayStation 4; December 12, 2024
- Genre: First-person shooter
- Mode: Multiplayer

The Finals, stylized as THE FINALS, is a free-to-play first-person shooter developed and published by Embark Studios. The game focuses on team-based matches within arenas with a fully destructible environment, which players can use to their advantage.

== Gameplay ==
In The Finals, teams of players must compete against each other as they take part in a fictional VR combat game show.

Players compete as contestants in the fictional VR combat game show, The Finals, set in the year 2100. Matches are presented as live spectacles of "the world's greatest game show" in front of holographic crowds spectating the arenas, and bolstered by an announcer who often reacts to exciting moments in a larger-than-life manner. Players receive diegetic updates on the game state from the show's two commentators— Scotty and June— who comment on the status of the teams (such as team wipes and respawns), objectives, the round timer, and highlight bursts of destruction or elimination streaks. Developer Embark Studios has stated that the game is partly inspired by The Hunger Games, The Running Man (1982) and Gladiator (2000).

Each game mode varies from 2 to 4 teams, each competing in a free-for-all competition. Players create their contestants beginning by choosing between the Light, Medium, or Heavy build. The three builds differ in size, speed, and health. Light contestants are the smallest and exceptionally fast— specializing in stealth and evasion while executing hit-and-run tactics— but with low survivability given only 175 HP. The Medium build is akin to a traditional soldier class — specializing in utility and support — with 250 HP and middling movement speed. Heavy contestants are visually the largest, have high survivability from a pool of 325 HP but the slowest movement speed. Heavies specialize in demolition and fortifications.

Each build has a unique set of specializations, weapons, and gadgets, among some universally available gadgets. This variety allows players to design a loadout that suits their desired playstyle. The Light build is given specializations related to stealth and movement: the Cloaking Device, Evasive Dash, True Sight (which allows you to view enemies through smoke, debris, or see enemies who are invisible), or the Grappling Hook. Some gadgets unique to the Light build help players to evade and flank enemy contestants, such as teleportation Gateways, Vanishing Bombs, and Sonar Grenades, making them glass-cannon ambushers. The Medium build is given many specializations related to support and disruption, with the general idea of providing utility: the Healing Beam, Shockwave, Guardian Turret, and Dematerializer, a multi-device triggered specialization toggling a dematerialized state upon physical surfaces such as walls, floors, and ceilings, allowing any contestant to see or pass through. The gadgets unique to the Medium build further reinforce their utility role, including the Defibrillator, Glitch Trap, APS Turret, Jump Pad, Zipline, and more. The Heavy build encourages a wide variety of gameplay. Their list of specializations include the Charge 'N' Slam, Mesh Shield, Winch Claw, and Goo Gun; each completely changing the manner in which the contestant is played. Heavies have at their disposal powerful, hard-hitting destructive tools and weapons, such as the Sledgehammer, RPG-7, and C4, as well as defensive measures such as deployable Barricades, a spherical Dome Shield, and Healing Emitter.

The game mechanics encourage dynamic emergent gameplay by way of the many free variables present. These include highly player-modifiable terrain (both destruction and limited construction), varied weather and time of day (which change between rounds), and additional conditions such as moving platforms or structures suspended in the air. The arenas contain numerous items which can be picked up and thrown by the player, including but not limited to plant pots, chairs, and tables. Different types of canisters and barrels can be found both throughout the arena, and suspended in hanging boxes. These canisters can explode to destroy the environment, create temporary structures made up of goo, or create various effects such as fire, toxic gas, smoke, glitch explosions, and lingering health regeneration. Entire buildings can be toppled if the correct supports are targeted, and large enough debris can destroy other buildings. The game also allows for limited construction in the form of deployable cover (such as Barricades), as well as through the use of the Goo Gun, Goo Grenade and Goo Barrels, which solidify on impact, creating destructible structures of goo that resemble foam insulation. Smoke can extinguish fires, while fire can ignite toxic gas and burn through goo. These interactions allow players to combine environmental effects or counter those created by opponents.

Contestants who are eliminated disintegrate into coins and leave behind a revive statue which their teammates can pick up to reposition and interact with to revive. It takes five seconds of continuous interaction to revive a contestant. Alternatively, Medium-build players may use an equipped defibrillator to revive their teammate after a short charge, during which the contestant's outline appears and visually refills with voxels. Contestants revived by a defibrillator respawn with 50% of their health, the same state of their weapon at elimination, and incur a short cooldown on their specializations and gadgets. If enough time elapses, a player may choose to respawn themselves at full health using a Respawn coin. In quick-play game modes, there are unlimited Respawn coins, while in Tournament game modes, the amount is limited, gaining one extra coin per round. If a team wipe occurs, the respawn timer is reset and all members will respawn together at the same time without consuming their coins. Players who are eliminated with no more coins must wait for a teammate to revive, or a team wipe. While potentially strategic in Cashout, a team wipe penalty in Ranked Cashout costs 15% of the team's total cash.

Upon the launch of Season 12, the currency: VR's; were removed from the game. Their use was to buy new weapons, gadgets, and specializations, but now those are unlocked via playstyle tokens.

== Game modes ==
As a live service game, The Finals receives new game modes and revisions to existing ones regularly. Game modes are divided into casual ("Quick Cash") and competitive modes.

=== Cashout ===
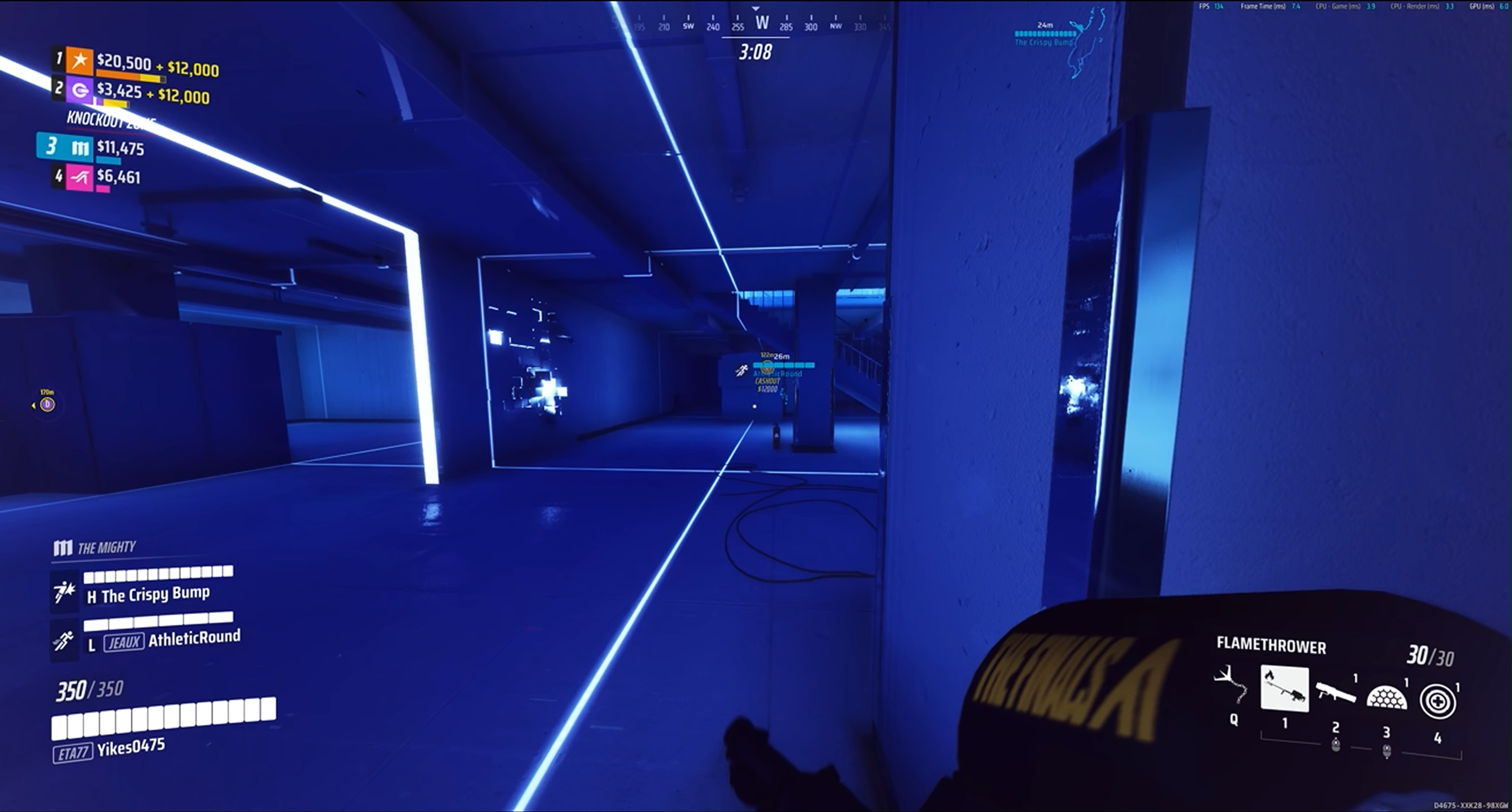
A screenshot of a game of Cashout from player perspective. Game wide cash standings can be seen top left.

Cashout is The Finals' premier game mode. In Cashout, four teams of three contestants compete against one another to deposit and cash out as much cash as possible. The primary source of money are Cashboxes, that must be unlocked from Vaults around the arena and brought to a Cashout station. Upon contact with a Cashout station, a Cashbox will enter and the team that deposits it earns 20% of its value. The team that holds the Cashout station once the cashout completes receives the remaining 80%. Other teams can steal a cashout in progress by interacting with the Cashout station without interruption for 7 seconds. Excluding the final round, two cash boxes will be in play at any given time, with a new vault spawning every time a team cashout is completed.

Each successive pair of vaults that appears in the arena is more valuable than the last, ranging anywhere from $10,000 to $22,000, enabling a team that would otherwise surely be eliminated to qualify, even in the very last second of the round. Multiple vaults can be brought to a single Cashout station, combining their payouts under one timer. Additional bonus money can be earned by eliminating enemy players ($500 each), unlocking vaults ($1000 each), and stealing cashouts ($1000 each). Contestants start with two Respawn coins, and gain an additional coin at the end of each round.

Cashout durations are relatively the same across matches. If there is not enough time left for a Cashout, up to one minute of overtime will be triggered.

Cashout Durations
| Game Mode | Standard Duration | Duration at 2:00 | Duration at 1:30 | Duration at 1:00 | Duration at 0:30 | Duration at 0:00 |
|---|---|---|---|---|---|---|
| Quick Cash Head2Head Final round of Cashout and Ranked Cashout | 2:00 | 2:00 | 1:30^{+0:30} | 1:00^{+1:00} | 0:30^{+1:00} | 0:00^{+1:00} |
| Knockout rounds of Cashout and Ranked Cashout | 2:10 | 2:00^{+0:10} | 1:30^{+0:40} | 1:00^{+1:00} | 0:30^{+1:00} | 0:00^{+1:00} |

Aspects of Cashout take inspiration from capture the flag and king of the hill, requiring teams to obtain, hold and then defend different objectives to progress and ultimately win the tournament.

Rounds last 9 minutes, with the possibility of an additional 1-minute overtime if a vault is deposited into a Cashout station within the last 60 seconds of the round (see table above). Players cannot change their contestant once the round starts, but they can swap items from their reserve loadout once eliminated. Any changes take effect only if respawning (i.e. not revived by a teammate).

Cashout and Ranked Tournaments are played in a tournament-style bracket with 8 teams: In the first round, teams compete against each other in groups of four, with the top two teams from each group moving to the second round. The top two teams in the second round then fight in a final round to declare the tournament winners. In the final round, the rules are modified: The first team to score two cashouts wins, regardless of eliminations or objectives done. During Season 2, there was also a single-round variant of Cashout.

==== World Tour ====
Debuted on June 13, 2024, with Season 3, World Tour was originally a mode consisting of weekly rotating Cashout Tournaments with changing variations of the standard ranked rules. Players were ranked on a leaderboard based on their cash earned, while Win Points given based on tournament placement were used to progress a World Tour badge and gain additional rewards at the end of the season. The Finals initially featured both Ranked and Unranked Tournaments, but the Unranked variation was removed in Season 2, and later reintroduced as World Tour. In Season 3, the Cashout ranked tournament was temporarily replaced with World Tour to allow the developers to experiment with balancing changes, before it would be reintroduced alongside World Tour in the next season.

Now, all game modes— including Ranked— progress players' World Tour badge.

The amount of World Tour Points granted after each match is based on player performance. Higher match placements award more World Tour Points, and points cannot be lost. Acquiring points upgrades the player's World Tour Badge, which rewards premium in-game currency at the end of the season.

While Cashout features the same format as Ranked Tournaments, including four teams of three in each round, the rules are slightly more relaxed, allowing for gameshow events such as Mega Damage and Low Gravity, and players swapping items from their reserve loadout between respawns. At the end of the first two rounds, the two teams among the four with the lowest cash are eliminated from the match. At the end of the final (third) round, the first team to obtain $50,000 cash will win the tournament.

==== Ranked Cashout ====
Ranked Cashout is The Finals' competitive mode following standard Cashout rules, except that players can only modify their loadout from the reserve slots in between rounds. There is also a 15% total cash penalty for getting team wiped. As players participate in tournaments, they increase their ranking through various leagues, ranging from Bronze to Diamond. The five-hundred highest-ranked players at the end of the season are given a special Ruby rank, additionally, they are given a Ruby coin, which can be used to choose a ruby weapon skin for their desired weapon. Players earn or lose rank points depending on the combined skill of the enemy teams, the expected outcome of the match as a result, and the team's final placement when they are eliminated or win.

==== Quick Cash ====
In this quick-play variation of the Cashout game mode, three teams of three compete against one another to earn cash. The winner of the game is the first team to complete two cashouts. Eliminations, assists, and enemy team wipes do not count towards a team's cash score.

=== Solo Showdown ===
Solo Showdown is a free-for-all tournament-style game mode released in Season 12. Twelve players compete in a tournament where there is a random minigame each round. Players eliminate each other to score cash, and the bottom four players with the least amount of cash are eliminated each round up until the final round. Minigames include brand new modes, along with returning limited time modes such as Heavy Hitters and Blast Off, which have been tweaked to work with the tournament-style format.

=== Point Break ===
Point Break, added in Season 9, follows an Attack/Defend format, having two teams of eight fight against each other. Attackers are meant to activate nine Grand Vaults, that appear in waves of three at a time, with new Grand Vaults spawning after the previous three have been destroyed, while Defenders must either prevent or deactivate them. Defenders have an infinite amount of Respawn Credits, while Attackers share a pool of them. However, Attackers can gain more Credits upon successfully destroying a Grand Vault.

=== Power Shift ===
Added in Season 2, the Power Shift mode is a 5v5 King of the Hill style mode where two teams fight for control of a floating platform, with both teams attempting to push the platform in opposite directions. When captured, the platform follows a set path around the arena and will destroy any terrain in its way. The game will end when one team moves the platform towards their designated base. If time runs out while the losing team has control, overtime is incurred where they must move the platform back to the center point. As other quick-play game modes, Power Shift allows players to change not only their loadout, but also their contestants throughout the match, and have full access to all weapons, specializations and gadgets. Loadout changes will take effect whenever a contestant respawns, but not when they are revived.

=== Team Deathmatch ===
Team Deathmatch debuted towards the end of Season 5, being a temporary game mode brought into the game by the in-universe hacker group known as CNS. Two teams of 5 fight in a best-of-3 format. In each round, teams must earn $3000 (30 eliminations, $100 per elimination) to win the round, and be the first team to win two rounds. The game mode returned at the beginning of Season 6 as a permanent quick play game mode to huge positive reception by fans, mimicking the previous love of the mode during its temporary addition.

=== Head-2-Head ===
Head-2-Head was a limited-time event game mode added on August 14, 2025, and lasted until September 10, 2025. The game mode follows Tournament Cashout rules, specifically the final round of a Cashout Tournament, where two teams of three fight to earn two cashouts. Unlike the tournament modes, as a casual mode, Respawn coins are provided in unlimited quantity. During its original run, it also featured an exclusive game show event where a kaiju-style monster throws debris around the arena, destroying terrain over time. From season 8 to 10, Head-2-Head replaced Terminal Attack as a permanent game mode. Since Season 10, the game mode remains playable only in private matches.

=== Bank It (Removed Indefinitely) ===
Bank It was a game mode that focused on player vs. player combat and individual play. Scattered around the arena were various caches filled with cash—represented by floating holographic coins—which four teams of three competed to collect. Coins were stored by contestants on their person. Any time a contestant was eliminated, they'd drop all their cash. The cash could be "banked" at temporary deposit stations spawning the arena, funneling teams to converge to secure their earned cash. The first team to bank $40,000 in currency wins.

==== Solo Bank It (Removed Indefinitely) ====
Bank It also had a temporary solo game mode, where twelve players compete individually in a free-for-all format rather than in teams.

=== Terminal Attack (Removed Indefinitely) ===
Terminal Attack was initially a limited-time event bomb game mode launched on May 2, 2024. This game mode was set to end on May 22, 2024. In Terminal Attack, ten players are divided into two groups of five – Attackers and Defenders. Attackers have limited time to breach and insert a Decryption Key into one of two Terminals available in the arena (planting a "bomb"). Meanwhile, Defenders must strategize and coordinate their defense to stop the Attackers from achieving their objective by eliminating them or stopping the hack (defusing). The teams switch sides after three rounds in a best-of-7 format. In this game mode, players cannot respawn or heal themselves, and Medium builds are unable to use their Healing Beam or Defibrillator, meaning each contestant has just one life per round, only able to regenerate a small portion of their health while out of combat. Additionally, items such as grenades or traps have limited charges and are only renewed at the start of each round. The damage dealt to the arena is persistent until teams switch sides. Terminal Attack is similar to the default modes in Valorant and Counter-Strike.

On May 22, 2024, Embark announced that Terminal Attack will become a permanent game mode due to greater than expected popularity. On June 7, 2024, it was announced that in Season 3 of The Finals, Terminal Attack would replace Cashout Tournament as the main ranked mode. According to Embark, this was to give the developers time to balance Cashout without affecting the leaderboards. As of September 26, 2024, partially due to heated backlash from the fanbase, Cashout Tournament was reinstated as the main ranked game mode, with Terminal Attack being relegated to a quick-play game mode. As of Season 8 since September 10, 2025, Terminal Attack has been removed from the game, and is replaced with Head-2-Head.

== Event game modes ==
=== Steal The Spotlight ===
Steal The Spotlight was a limited-time event game mode, which was a variant of Solo Bank It. This event lasted from January 31 until February 14, 2024. In Steal The Spotlight, contestants played as the Heavy with a pre-set loadout consisting of the Lewis Gun and SA1216 as primary weapons, a variety of gadgets, and Charge 'n Slam as their Specialization. There was also a unique set of cosmetics for this game mode which all players had equipped while in the match. By completing certain contracts within Steal The Spotlight, contestants could obtain the cosmetic items worn in the game. During the match, the gameplay was the same as regular Solo Bank It, except that the arena was always Las Vegas and there were special turrets and laser sensors near all Cashout stations which added a new aspect of stealthiness.

=== Smoking Guns ===
Smoking Guns was a limited-time event game mode, which was a variant of Cashout. This event originally lasted from February 29 to March 3, 2024, but was extended to March 14. In Smoking Guns, contestants choose a preset loadout for the three builds in the game that restricts one to Western-style equipment. Each Build was able to use the frag grenades, pyro grenades, and gas grenades. Light was limited to the Grappling Hook as the Specialization, The Sword, SH1900 (Sawed-Off Shotgun), and The SR-84 (Sniper Rifle) for the weapons, and Smoke Grenade and Glitch Grenade for the build-specific gadgets. Medium was restricted to the Healing Beam as the Specialization, R.357 and Model 1887 for the weapons, and the Zipline, Explosive Mines, and Goo Grenades for the build-specific gadgets. Heavy was restricted to Charge 'n Slam for the Specialization, The Lewis Gun and The Sledgehammer for the weapons, and Pyro Mine and Barricades for build-specific gadgets. There was also a specific set of cosmetics for this game mode which all players had equipped during the match. By completing certain contracts within Smoking Guns, contestants could obtain the cosmetic items worn in the game mode. During the match, the gameplay was the same as regular Cashout, except that the arena was always Monaco and there were Western-style objects and decorations.

=== Bunny Bash ===
Bunny Bash was a limited-time event game mode, which was a variant of Power Shift. This event lasted from March 27 to April 10, 2024. In Bunny Bash, contestants choose a preset loadout for each of the three builds in the game. These loadouts promoted the new weapons introduced to the game at the start of Season 2, including the Famas and the KS-23. Similar to the Smoking Guns event, each Build was able to use the frag grenades, pyro grenades, and gas grenades. Light was limited to the Grappling Hook as the Specialization, and The Sword and The SR-84 (Sniper Rifle) for the weapons. Medium was restricted to the Healing Beam as the Specialization and the Famas and Model 1887 for the weapons. Heavy was restricted to Charge 'n Slam for the Specialization, and the KS-23 and The Sledgehammer for the weapons. Similar to Smoking Guns, there was also a specific set of cosmetics for this game mode in the form of Easter-themed bunny suits, which all players had equipped during the match. By completing certain contracts within Bunny Bash, contestants could obtain the cosmetic items worn in the game mode in addition to Easter-themed weapon skins. During the match, the gameplay was the same as regular Power Shift, except that the arena was always SYS$HORIZON and there were Easter-style objects and decorations.

=== Heavy Hitters ===
Heavy Hitters was a limited-time event game mode that lasted from May 22 to June 12, 2025, which included a new arena designed to be the interior of an "OSPUZE Tiger Juice" can, a drink created by one of the gameshow's sponsors. All contestants get a preset loadout on the Heavy build with the Charge n' Slam, and a modified Sledgehammer that swings up for its alternate attack. The goal was to knock other player's off the arena with updated interactions that caused the Sledgehammer to deal significant knockback. The lower the health of a player, the further they would travel when hit, similar to the game Super Smash Bros, and the goal was to earn $3000 (30 total eliminations). It returned as part of the Solo Showdown game mode in Season 12.

=== Blast Off! ===
Blast Off! was a limited-time event game mode that lasted from July 3 to July 17, 2025. This game mode follows Deathmatch rules with some modifications: The first team to earn 35 eliminations, or whichever team has the most eliminations before the timer runs out, wins the round. Every player is locked to playing as a Medium, with no access to specializations. Additionally, every player receives the CL-40, APS Turret, Jump Pad and RPG-7 as gadgets. For aesthetics, the graphics and sound quality were reduced, new sound effects for weapons were added, and a different announcer was used for the game mode. It returned as part of the Solo Showdown game mode in Season 12.

=== Super Cashball ===
Super Cashball was a limited-time event game mode that lasted from July 24 to August 7, 2025 and February 5 to February 10, 2026. The game mode is an entirely new mode that pits two teams of five against each other. The objective is to claim a "Cashball" at the center of an arena, and toss it into the enemy's goal to earn points. Throwing the ball to an ally who catches it "charges" the Cashball, adding one more point to its value up to a maximum of three points. The game mode lasts 10 minutes with a brief intermission at the 5-minute mark to allow players to regroup and change their loadouts. Players can choose from three preset loadouts, one for each build.

=== Heaven or Else ===
Heaven or Else was a limited-time event game mode that lasted from October 2 to October 16, 2025. The game mode was nearly the same as the Heavy Hitters event. Players' preset loadouts included the Heavy build with Charge 'n' Slam, a modified spear, jump pad, goo grenade, and healing ball. The modified spear could repel opponents with both its primary and secondary attacks. Additionally, the secondary attack spun for only one round, down from three in the normal version. The modified spear could also deal more damage to buildings, typically requiring only two or three hits to destroy a wall. The physical law was also modified - the lower HP players had, the easier it was for them to be repelled over a long distance. In exchange, players could not be eliminated by damage - only by dropping outside of the arena would truly eliminate them.

=== Ghoul Rush ===
Ghoul Rush was a limited-time event game mode that lasted from October 23 to November 6, 2025. The game mode was brand new. Twelve players would enter the game as twelve solo teams, and choose from two preset loadouts as "Survivors" — Medium build and Heavy build. The Medium survivor set contains Guardian Turret as the specialization, P90 as the weapon, and Explosive Mine, Goo Grenade, and Proximity Sensor as gadgets. The Heavy build survivor set contains Charge 'N' Slam as the specialization, M60 as the weapon, and the Lockbolt as a gadget. Players will be rewarded cash for elimination and survival time as survivors, and the player with the most cash after three rounds will win the match. After players have been eliminated as "Survivors", they will turn into "Ghouls" with a completely different preset loadouts. The Ghouls' preset loadouts include Heavy build with winch claw and sledgehammer, and light build with evasive dash (Unable to store usage count) and dagger. Both weapons for Ghouls have no secondary attack but do have a primary attack that deals more damage to buildings

== Chinese version ==
On June 17, 2025, IGN China posted a video primarily about the Chinese version of The Finals. In collaboration with Tencent, Embark and Nexon began localizing this game for China's cultural context. In the video, the game developers from Tencent discussed the upcoming beta test of the Chinese version, the unique features coming (including skins, events, and maps), and their determination to eliminate bugs and cheaters. Examples of the new features include character skins related to food delivery services in China, a Defibrillator skin in a pen-shaped adrenaline injection shape, and upgradable skins (for both the character and weapons) with a unique color for each upgrade using multi-bucks. The game was officially released on November 18, 2025.

== Sponsors ==
The Finals introduced a sponsorship feature in Season 4, in which players could choose a seasonal, fictional sponsor to sign with. Players who signed with a sponsor could unlock cosmetics themed to that sponsor. Each season following, players were given a set of new sponsors to sign with, possibly including their previous sponsor. This continued until Season 9, when players were given the option to sign with any sponsor aside from CNS, allowing them to earn cosmetics they had missed in previous seasons. Season 12 changed the sponsorship system again, allowing players to complete challenges to unlock cosmetic items and text/audio logs related to their chosen sponsor. It was followed by Season 11, Galaxy Masters, on July 9, 2026, sponsored by COMETA, which added a new arena, Galaxy Estates, along with bot matches and a reworked melee combat system. With the new system, ALFA ACTA, OSPUZE and ISEUL-T became permanent sponsor options, each with its own challenges and "Signature Plays" that reward particular in-game actions with additional fans; Embark stated that further sponsors may be added in future seasons without replacing existing ones.

Sponsors are often featured throughout the maps through various props, such as street paint, advertisement banners, in-game announcements etc. Whilst the main sponsors are those that players can sign with, The Finals also features additional fictional brands found on game cosmetics, such as ÖRF. These brands serve as world-building elements separate to the main sponsors.

The following are the set of choosable sponsors.

| Sponsor | Season introduced | Description | Slogan |
|---|---|---|---|
| HOLTOW | 4 | An insurance company focused on protecting digital assets | "Digitally insured, virtually secured." |
| ISEUL-T | 2 | A Korean clothing line | "The Bias Wrecker", "Transcending Realities" and "be ANYBODY be EVERYBODY be ISEUL-T" |
| ENGIMO | 4 | A communications company | "Beyond boundaries; within reach" |
| VAIIYA | 2 | A cybersecurity company | "We deliver harmony and peace of mind. We protect you from everyone. Including yourself," and "We, as one." |
| DISSUN | 3 | A private grid contractor | "Energy for your reality." and "Powering eliminations." |
| ALFA ACTA | 6 | A family-owned defense company | "Tradition meets Lethality.", "Minimize Risk. Maximize Firepower." and "SAFE. SECURE. OVERPOWERED." |
| CNS | 2 | A mysterious hacking collective | "seek the truth beyond the walls." |
| TRENTILA | 8 | An agricultural company | "The Taste of Tomorrow.", "Slightly Unstable. Shockingly Good." and "Real Fruit. But Better." |
| OSPUZE | 9 | An energy drink company | "Pop. Pour. Perform." |
| COMETA | 11 | A space habitat provider and space tourism company | "You Can't Escape. From Progress," "Leave the World Below," and "Stop Visiting the Future. Move In." |

== Development ==
The Finals, along with Arc Raiders, are the first two titles from Stockholm-based Embark Studios. A producer noted that destructibility changed the way the player approached the game, saying "we're constantly surprised by the new and inventive ways players utilize the freedom the game grants. Why open a door when you can use a rocket launcher to blow a hole in the wall, right?".

The title was announced in August 2022 for PC, with console ports later unveiled for PlayStation 5 and Xbox Series X and Series S. Closed betas were run in early 2023, with the first closed beta lasting from March 7–21, 2023, and the second closed beta occurring between June 14–21. An open beta took place between October 26 until November 5.

The Finals was released on PC, Xbox Series X&S, and PlayStation 5 on December 7, 2023, during The Game Awards 2023. The Finals features full support for crossplay, allowing players on different platforms to play together. Upon release, underperforming servers caused the developers to put a temporary cap on player counts. The game was also later ported to the PlayStation 4 on December 12, 2024, however it was not ported to the Xbox One due to hardware limitations. In November 2025, the studio announced that the PS4 version would be shut down on March 18, 2026. With the release of Season 10 on March 26, 2026, the PS4 version was shut down. Season 10, titled Fantasy League, launched on March 26, 2026, with ALFA ACTA as its official sponsor. It was followed by Season 11, Galaxy Masters, on July 9, 2026, sponsored by COMETA, which added a new arena, Galaxy Estates, along with bot matches and a reworked melee combat system. Season 12, Prime Time, launched on October 20, 2026; Embark described it as the game's biggest update since launch, adding a solo tournament mode, reworked arenas and destruction, and a dynamic commentary system that generates spoken reactions to players' actions during matches.

Despite Kernel-Level Anti-cheat imported into the game, to combat cheaters, the developers noted that they will continue to support the Steam Deck, and other SteamOS devices.

== Reception ==
Reception

Aggregate scores
| Aggregator | Score |
|---|---|
| Metacritic | PC: 80% |
| OpenCritic | 85% |

Review scores
| Publication | Score |
|---|---|
| Game Informer | 9/10 |
| IGN | 8/10 |

According to IGN, poor performance and low frame rates posed an issue during the game's early closed betas. This game also has problems in balance, as Justin Koreis pointed out that "balance issues are a bit of a concern at the moment" generally because "Heavies tend to be ubiquitous in competitive modes."

The Finals has also been criticized for the use of the AI-based text-to-speech program created by ElevenLabs to artificially generate the voices of characters, rather than utilizing traditional voice actors. Embark Studios responded to the criticism, telling Axios that the generated voicework in The Finals is "based on a mix of professional voice actors and temp voices from Embark employees."

=== Accolades ===
| Year | Award | Category | Result | Ref. |
|---|---|---|---|---|
| 2024 | 27th Annual D.I.C.E. Awards | Online Game of the Year | Nominated | |
| 2024 | 27th Annual D.I.C.E. Awards | Outstanding Technical Achievement | Nominated | |
| 2024 | The Steam Awards | Best Game You Suck At | Nominated | |

== Esports ==
In 2025, The Finals branched out into Esports with The Grand Major. It occurred at DreamHack in Stockholm, Sweden, and consisted of 3 rounds: an open qualifier (August 30, 2025), closed qualifier (September 20–22, 2025) and a major group stage (November 28–29, 2025). All three rounds consisted of a mix of matches in both the Cashout and Final Round formats. 16 teams competed in the in-person event, including NTMR, Fnatic, Team Secret, Spacestation Gaming, among others. NTMR beat Team Secret in the final round, winning The Grand Major with a first place prize of $37,500. Team Secret received $17,500. The compeition is scheduled to reoccur in 2026, with a prize pool of $200,000.
