= Miguel Molina (racing driver) =

Spanish racing driver (born 1989)

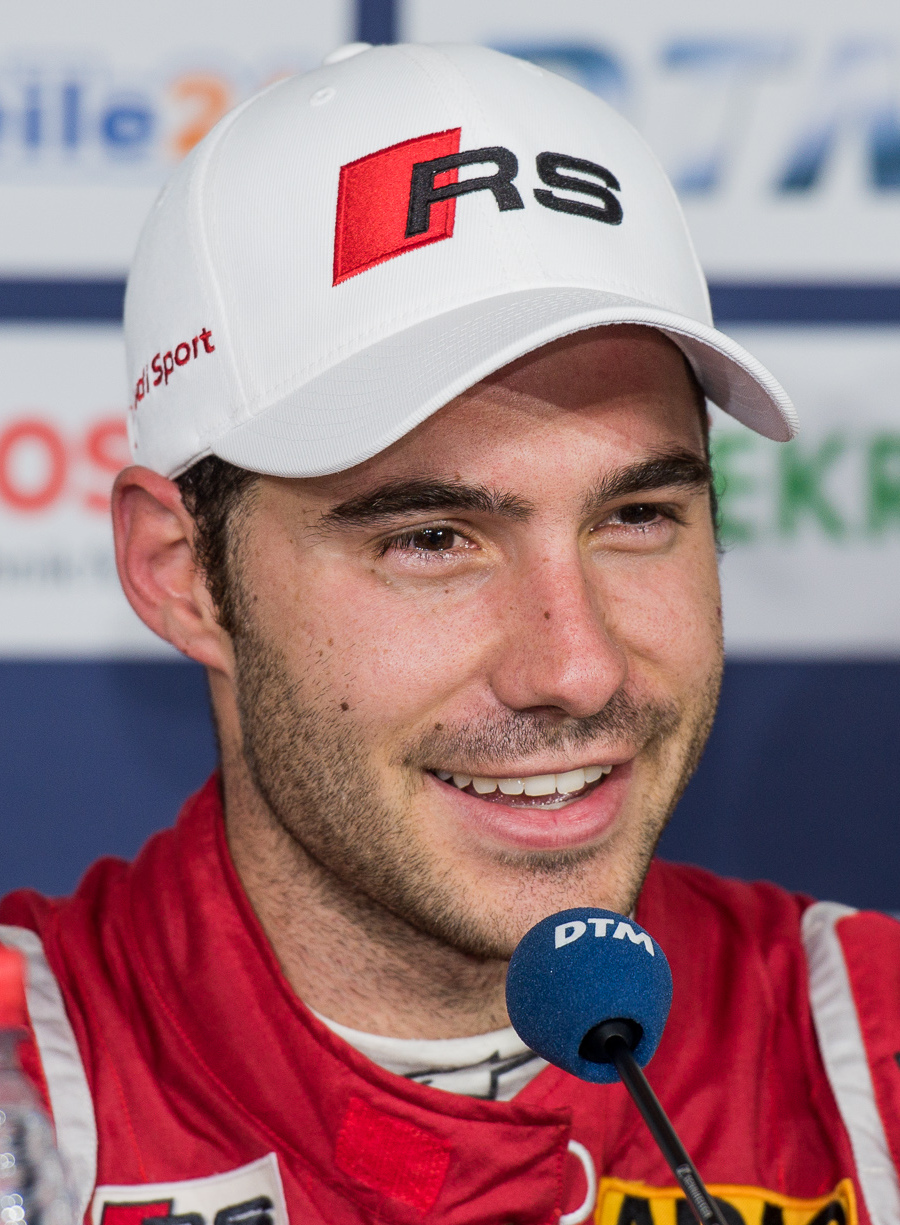
- Molina in 2014
- Nationality: (Spain) Spanish
- Born: Miguel Molina González; 17 February 1989 (age 37) Girona, Spain

DTM career
- Debut season: 2010
- Current team: Abt Sportsline
- Categorisation: FIA Platinum
- Car number: 17
- Former teams: Phoenix Racing
- Starts: 87
- Championships: 0
- Wins: 3
- Poles: 6
- Fastest laps: 5
- Best finish: 10th in 2010
- Finished last season: 13th (66 pts)

Previous series
- 2006–09 2009 2006 2005 2004: Formula Renault 3.5 Series; Superleague Formula; Spanish Formula Three; Eurocup FR2.0; Spanish FJunior 1600

Miguel Molina González (born 17 February 1989) is a Spanish racing driver. A Ferrari factory driver since 2017, Molina competed in the FIA World Endurance Championship in LMGTE Pro before graduating to Hypercar. He won the 2024 24 Hours of Le Mans alongside Antonio Fuoco and Nicklas Nielsen. Previously, he drove in DTM for Audi, and was a member of the Circuit de Catalunya Young Drivers Programme.

== Career ==
=== Karting ===
Like many racing drivers, Molina started his early motorsport career in karting, winning successive Spanish Cadet Championships in 1999 and 2000, as well as the Catalan Junior Championship in 2001 and Spanish Junior Championship in 2003.

=== Early career ===
In 2004, Molina began his single-seater career in the Spanish Formula Junior 1600 series, where he finished the season in sixth place. The following year he stepped up to the Eurocup Formula Renault 2.0 championship with Pons Racing, scoring three points to finish the season 28th overall. In 2006, he switched to the Spanish Formula Three Championship with the Racing Engineering team, taking one race win and a further five podium finishes to end the season sixth in the standings.

=== Formula Renault 3.5 Series ===
Towards the end of 2006, Molina joined the Formula Renault 3.5 Series with GD Racing, competing in the final six races of the season, scoring a point in the final race of the season at Barcelona.

For 2007, Molina moved up to the series full-time with Pons Racing, scoring two race wins (at Estoril and Barcelona) and two further podium places on his way to seventh in the final standings. In 2008 he once again competed in the championship, teaming up with fellow Spanish driver Álvaro Barba at Prema Powerteam. He claimed four podiums during the season, including race wins at the Nürburgring and Estoril, to finish fourth in the championship. After testing for Prema, Epsilon Euskadi and KTR during the off-season, Molina was signed by Ultimate Motorsport for the 2009 season. Despite the team pulling out of the final two rounds, Molina finished eighth in the championship.

=== Superleague Formula ===
In June 2009, Molina made his debut in the Superleague Formula series, taking part in the opening round of the season at Magny-Cours for Al Ain. He finished the first race in ninth before taking fourth place in the second event.

=== DTM ===
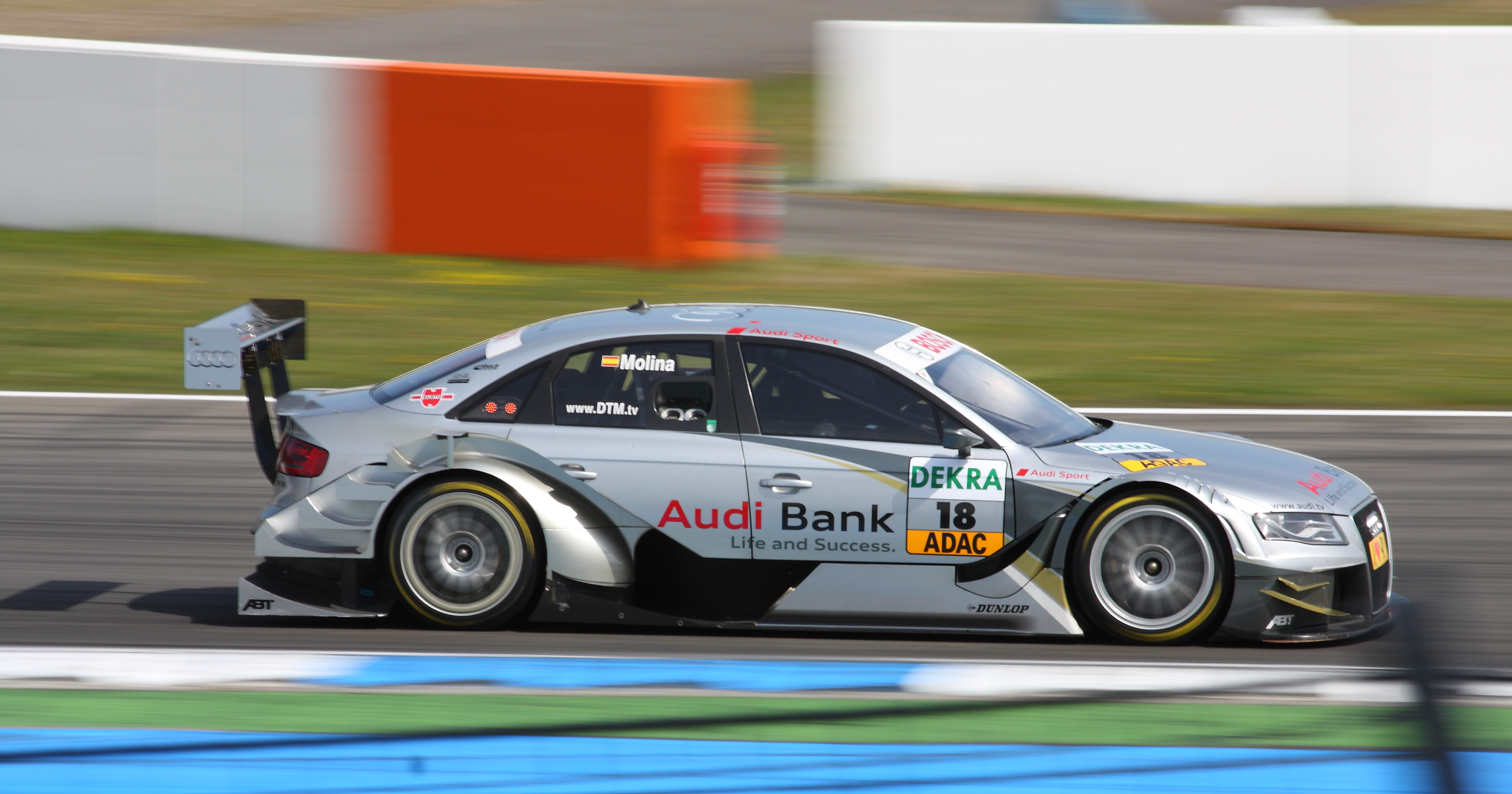
Molina made his DTM début at Hockenheim in 2010.

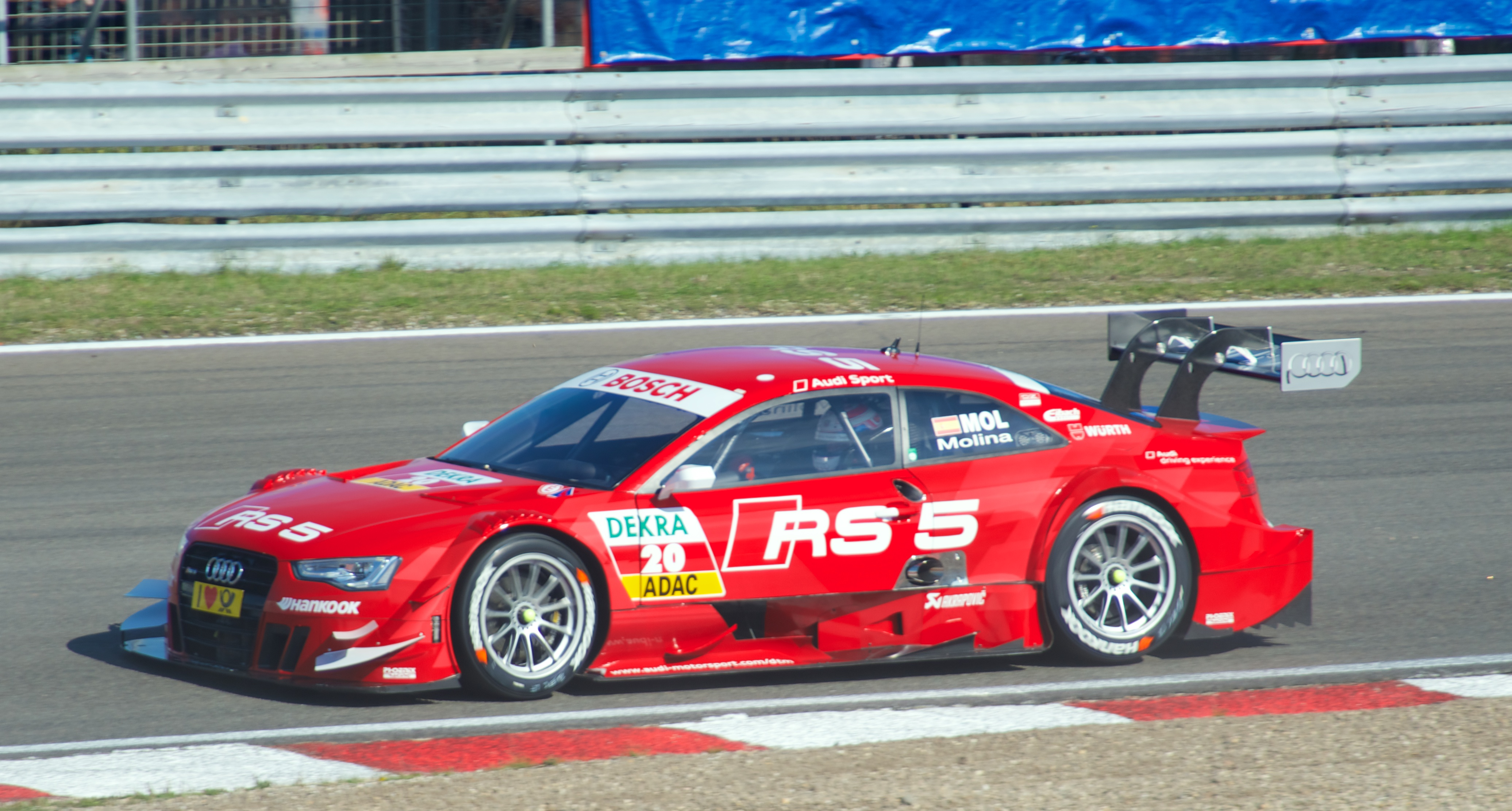
Molina drives his Audi RS5 DTM at Zandvoort in 2013.

Molina moved from single-seaters to touring cars in 2010, joining the works Audi Sport Team Abt Sportsline squad in the DTM series, where he raced a 2008-spec Audi A4.

=== WEC ===
In 2024, Molina, along with Nicklas Nielsen and Antonio Fuoco of the number 50 Ferrari AF Corse team, won the 24 Hours of Le Mans in the Hypercar category.

== Racing record ==
=== Career summary ===
Season	Series	Team	Races	Wins	Poles	F/Laps	Podiums	Points	Position
2004	Spanish Formula Junior 1600	?	?	?	?	?	?	52	6th
2005	Eurocup Formula Renault 2.0	Pons Racing	16	0	0	0	0	3	28th
2006	Spanish Formula 3 Championship	Racing Engineering	15	1	0	0	6	73	6th
2006	Formula Renault 3.5 Series	GD Racing	6	0	0	0	0	1	32nd
2007	Formula Renault 3.5 Series	Pons Racing	16	2	0	1	4	66	7th
2008	Formula Renault 3.5 Series	Prema Powerteam	17	2	1	0	4	79	4th
2009	Formula Renault 3.5 Series	Ultimate Motorsport	13	0	0	2	3	64	8th
2009	Superleague Formula	Al Ain	2	0	0	0	0	135†	19th†
2010	Deutsche Tourenwagen Masters	Abt Sportsline	11	0	0	1	0	15	10th
2011	Deutsche Tourenwagen Masters	Abt Sportsline	10	0	2	0	1	11	11th
2012	Deutsche Tourenwagen Masters	Phoenix Racing	10	0	0	0	0	8	18th
2013	Deutsche Tourenwagen Masters	Phoenix Racing	10	0	0	0	0	19	17th
2014	Deutsche Tourenwagen Masters	Audi Sport Team Abt Sportsline	10	0	1	1	1	32	17th
2014	Stock Car Brasil	Mobil Super Racing	1	0	0	0	0	0	NC‡
2015	Deutsche Tourenwagen Masters	Audi Sport Team Abt Sportsline	18	1	2	1	2	54	17th
2015	Blancpain Endurance Series - Pro	Saintéloc	1	0	0	0	0	6	24th
2016	Deutsche Tourenwagen Masters	Audi Sport Team Abt Sportsline	18	2	1	1	3	66	13th
2016	Australian GT Championship	JAMEC PEM Racing	2	0	0	0	0	25	NC
2016	Australian Endurance Championship	JAMEC PEM Racing	2	0	0	1	0	150	NC
2017	FIA World Endurance Championship - LMGTE Am	Spirit of Race	8	1	0	3	4	97	5th
2017	FIA World Endurance Championship - LMGTE Pro	AF Corse	1	0	0	0	0	32.5	13th
2017	24 Hours of Le Mans - LMGTE Pro	AF Corse	1	0	0	0	0	N/A	5th
2017	Blancpain GT Series Endurance Cup	SMP Racing	5	0	0	0	1	46	4th
2017	Intercontinental GT Challenge	SMP Racing	1	0	0	0	0	0	NC
2018	European Le Mans Series - LMGTE	JMW Motorsport	6	2	2	2	3	88	**2nd**
2018	Blancpain GT Series Endurance Cup	SMP Racing	5	0	1	1	1	23	20th
2018	Pirelli World Challenge	R. Ferri Motorsport	10	6	1	3	8	224	8th
2018	SprintX GT Championship Series	R. Ferri Motorsport	10	6	1	3	8	224	**1st**
2018	IMSA SportsCar Championship - GTD	Risi Competizione	1	0	0	0	0	14	62nd
2018	IMSA SportsCar Championship - GTLM	Risi Competizione	1	0	0	0	0	22	25th
2018	24 Hours of Le Mans - LMGTE Pro	AF Corse	1	0	0	0	0	N/A	9th
2018-19	FIA World Endurance Championship - LMGTE Pro	AF Corse	3	0	0	0	0	22	20th
2019	Blancpain GT World Challenge America	R. Ferri Motorsport	10	3	1	3	8	181	4th
2019	Blancpain GT Series Endurance Cup	SMP Racing	5	1	0	0	2	73	**2nd**
2019	Intercontinental GT Challenge	HubAuto Corsa	1	1	0	0	1	25	15th
2019	Intercontinental GT Challenge	SMP Racing	1	0	0	0	0	25	15th
2019	Intercontinental GT Challenge	CarGuy Racing	1	0	0	0	0	25	15th
2019	IMSA SportsCar Championship - GTLM	Risi Competizione	1	0	0	0	1	32	23rd
2019	24 Hours of Le Mans - LMGTE Pro	AF Corse	1	0	0	0	0	N/A	DNF
2019-20	FIA World Endurance Championship - LMGTE Pro	AF Corse	8	0	0	1	2	86	8th
2020	GT World Challenge Europe Endurance Cup	SMP Racing	3	0	0	0	0	0	NC
2020	Intercontinental GT Challenge	SMP Racing	1	0	0	0	0	0	NC
2020	24 Hours of Le Mans - LMGTE Pro	AF Corse	1	0	0	0	0	N/A	NC
2021	FIA World Endurance Championship - LMGTE Pro	AF Corse	6	0	1	3	3	92	4th
2021	24 Hours of Le Mans - LMGTE Pro	AF Corse	1	0	0	0	0	N/A	5th
2021	GT World Challenge Europe Endurance Cup	AF Corse	1	0	0	0	0	0	NC
2021	Intercontinental GT Challenge	AF Corse	2	0	0	0	1	19	10th
2021	European Le Mans Series - LMGTE	Iron Lynx	6	3	0	0	6	126	**1st**
2022	FIA World Endurance Championship - LMGTE Pro	AF Corse	6	1	0	0	5	131	**3rd**
2022	24 Hours of Le Mans - LMGTE Pro	AF Corse	1	0	0	0	1	N/A	**3rd**
2022	GT World Challenge Europe Endurance Cup	Iron Lynx	5	0	0	0	1	37	10th
2022	Intercontinental GT Challenge	Iron Lynx	1	0	0	0	0	20	12th
2022	Intercontinental GT Challenge	AF Corse - Francorchamps	1	0	0	0	0	20	12th
2022	European Le Mans Series - LMGTE	JMW Motorsport	1	0	0	0	1	15	19th
2023	FIA World Endurance Championship - Hypercar	Ferrari AF Corse	7	0	2	0	4	120	**3rd**
2023	24 Hours of Le Mans - Hypercar	Ferrari AF Corse	1	0	1	1	0	N/A	5th
2023	Asian Le Mans Series - GT	AF Corse	4	0	0	0	1	23	7th
2023	IMSA SportsCar Championship - GTD Pro	AF Corse	2	0	0	0	0	537	19th
2023	IMSA SportsCar Championship - GTD	AF Corse	2	0	0	0	0	337	47th
2024	FIA World Endurance Championship - Hypercar	Ferrari AF Corse	8	1	1	0	3	115	**2nd**
2024	IMSA SportsCar Championship - GTD	AF Corse	5	0	0	1	1	1154	30th
2025	FIA World Endurance Championship - Hypercar	Ferrari AF Corse	8	1	1	0	4	98	**3rd**
2025	European Le Mans Series - LMGT3	Kessel Racing	6	0	0	0	1	27	12th
2025	IMSA SportsCar Championship - GTD Pro	DragonSpeed	1	0	0	0	0	269	30th
2025	IMSA SportsCar Championship - GTD	Cetilar Racing	1	0	1	0	0	245	71st
2025	GT World Challenge Europe Endurance Cup	AF Corse	1	0	0	0	0	0	NC
2026	IMSA SportsCar Championship - GTD Pro	Triarsi Competizione	3	0	0	0	0	707	20th
2026	FIA World Endurance Championship - Hypercar	Ferrari AF Corse	8	1	1	0	3	72	9th
2026	GT World Challenge Europe Endurance Cup	AF Corse	1	0	0	0	0	0	NC
2026	GT World Challenge America - Pro	AF Corse USA	1	0	1	0	0	10	7th

^{†} Team standings. ^{‡} Ineligible for points.

=== Complete Eurocup Formula Renault 2.0 results ===
(key) (Races in bold indicate pole position) (Races in italics indicate fastest lap)

Year	Team	1	2	3	4	5	6	7	8	9	10	11	12	13	14	15	16	Pos	Points
2005	Pons Racing	ZOL; 1; 21	ZOL; 2; 26	VAL; 1; 28	VAL; 2 Ret	LMS; 1; 17	LMS; 2 Ret	BIL; 1; 20	BIL; 2; 18	OSC; 1; 12	OSC; 2; 23	DON; 1; 14	DON; 2 Ret	EST; 1; 18	EST; 2 Ret	MNZ; 1; 8	MNZ; 2; 19	28th	3

=== Complete Formula Renault 3.5 Series results ===
(key) (Races in bold indicate pole position) (Races in italics indicate fastest lap)

Year	Entrant	1	2	3	4	5	6	7	8	9	10	11	12	13	14	15	16	17	DC	Points
2006	GD Racing	ZOL; 1	ZOL; 2	MON; 1	IST; 1	IST; 2	MIS; 1	MIS; 2	SPA; 1	SPA; 2	NÜR; 1	NÜR; 2	DON; 1; 18	DON; 2; 22	LMS; 1; 13	LMS; 2; 15	CAT; 1; 11	CAT; 2; 10	32nd	1
2007	Pons Racing	MNZ; 1; 8	MNZ; 2 Ret	NÜR; 1; 10	NÜR; 2; 3	MON; 1; 13	HUN; 1; 20	HUN; 2; 15	SPA; 1 DNS	SPA; 2; 11	DON; 1; 12	DON; 2; 11	MAG; 1; 8	MAG; 2; 2	EST; 1; 1	EST; 2 Ret	CAT; 1; 1	CAT; 2; 15	7th	66
2008	Prema Powerteam	MNZ; 1 Ret	MNZ; 2 Ret	SPA; 1; 9	SPA; 2; 6	MON; 1; 9	SIL; 1; 23	SIL; 2 Ret	HUN; 1 Ret	HUN; 2; 3	NÜR; 1 Ret	NÜR; 2; 1	BUG; 1; 2	BUG; 2; 5	EST; 1; 7	**EST**; **2**; 1	CAT; 1 Ret	CAT; 2; 7	4th	79
2009	Ultimate Motorsport	CAT; 1; 9	CAT; 2; 14	SPA; 1; 3	SPA; 2; 3	MON; 1; 4	HUN; 1; 7	HUN; 2 Ret	SIL; 1; 9	SIL; 2 Ret	BUG; 1; 9	BUG; 2; 2	ALG; 1; 7	ALG; 2; 4	NÜR; 1	NÜR; 2	ALC; 1	ALC; 2	8th	64

=== Superleague Formula ===
(key)

Year	Team	1	2	3	4	5	6	7	8	9	10	11	12	Rank	Pts
2009	Al Ain Ultimate Motorsport	MAG; 9	MAG; 4	ZOL	ZOL	DON	DON	EST	EST	MOZ	MOZ	JAR	JAR	19th	135

==== Super Final Results ====
Year	Team	1	2	3	4	5	6
2009	Al Ain Ultimate Motorsport	MAG; DNQ	ZOL	DON	EST	MOZ	JAR

=== Complete Deutsche Tourenwagen Masters results ===
(key) (Races in bold indicate pole position) (Races in italics indicate fastest lap)

Year	Team	Car	1	2	3	4	5	6	7	8	9	10	11	12	13	14	15	16	17	18	Pos.	Points
2010	Abt Sportsline	Audi A4 DTM 2008	HOC; 8	VAL; 8	LAU; 13	NOR; Ret	NÜR; 14	ZAN; 5	BRH; 4	OSC; Ret	HOC; Ret	ADR; 17	SHA; 5								10th	15
2011	Abt Sportsline	Audi A4 DTM 2008	HOC; 16	ZAN; 14	SPL; 11	LAU; 16	NOR; 12	NÜR; 12	BRH; Ret	**OSC**; 8	VAL; 5	**HOC**; 3									11th	11
2012	Phoenix Racing	Audi A5 DTM	HOC; 9	LAU; 15	BRH; 7	SPL; Ret	NOR; 12	NÜR; 15	ZAN; Ret	OSC; 15	VAL; Ret	HOC; Ret									18th	8
2013	Phoenix Racing	Audi RS5 DTM	HOC; 15	BRH; 11	SPL; 14	LAU; 16	NOR; 14	MSC; Ret	NÜR; 8	OSC; 8	ZAN; 10	HOC; 5									17th	19
2014	Audi Sport Team Abt Sportsline	Audi RS5 DTM	HOC; 13	OSC; 6	HUN; 2	NOR; 22†	MSC; 12	SPL; 11	NÜR; Ret	LAU; 9	ZAN; 18†	**HOC**; 8									17th	32
2015	Audi Sport Team Abt Sportsline	Audi RS5 DTM	HOC; 1 Ret	HOC; 2; 18	**LAU**; **1**; 4	LAU; 2; 3	NOR; 1; 20	NOR; 2; 17	ZAN; 1 Ret	ZAN; 2; 12	SPL; 1; 18	SPL; 2; 13	MSC; 1 Ret	MSC; 2; 14	OSC; 1; 9	OSC; 2 Ret	NÜR; 1 Ret	**NÜR**; **2**; 1	HOC; 1; 17	HOC; 2; 11	17th	54
2016	Audi Sport Team Abt	Audi RS5 DTM	HOC; 1; 10	HOC; 2 Ret	SPL; 1; 19	SPL; 2; 14	**LAU**; **1**; 1	LAU; 2; 19	NOR; 1; 17	NOR; 2; 14	ZAN; 1; 18	ZAN; 2 Ret	MSC; 1; 17	MSC; 2; 11	NÜR; 1; 15	NÜR; 2; 20	HUN; 1; 3	HUN; 2; 18	HOC; 1; 1	HOC; 2; 14	13th	66

^{†} Driver did not finish, but completed 75% of the race distance.

=== Complete Stock Car Brasil results ===
Year	Team	Car	1	2	3	4	5	6	7	8	9	10	11	12	13	14	15	16	17	18	19	20	21	Rank	Points
2014	Mobil Super Pioneer Racing	Chevrolet Sonic	INT; 1; 13	SCZ; 1	SCZ; 2	BRA; 1	BRA; 2	GOI; 1	GOI; 2	GOI; 1	CAS; 1	CAS; 2	CUR; 1	CUR; 2	VEL; 1	VEL; 2	SCZ; 1	SCZ; 2	TAR; 1	TAR; 2	SAL; 1	SAL; 2	CUR; 1	NC†	0†

† Ineligible for championship points.

=== Complete GT World Challenge Europe results ===
==== GT World Challenge Europe Endurance Cup ====
Year	Team	Car	Class	1	2	3	4	5	6	7	Pos.	Points
2015	Saintéloc	Audi R8 LMS ultra	Pro	MNZ	SIL	LEC	SPA; 6H	SPA; 12H	SPA; 24H	NÜR; 7	24th	6
2017	SMP Racing	Ferrari 488 GT3	Pro	MNZ; 5	SIL; 4	LEC; 2	SPA; 6H; 51	SPA; 12H; 36	SPA; 24H; 24	CAT; Ret	4th	46
2018	SMP Racing	Ferrari 488 GT3	Pro	**MNZ**; 44	SIL; 7	LEC; 33	SPA; 6H; 22	SPA; 12H; 14	SPA; 24H; 10	CAT; 3	20th	23
2019	SMP Racing	Ferrari 488 GT3	Pro	MNZ; 23	SIL; 1	LEC; 2	SPA; 6H; 1	SPA; 12H; 1	SPA; 24H; 51	CAT; 13	2nd	73
2020	SMP Racing	Ferrari 488 GT3	Pro	IMO; 20	NÜR; 14	SPA; 6H; 14	SPA; 12H; 13	SPA; 24H; 19	LEC		NC	0
2021	AF Corse	Ferrari 488 GT3 Evo 2020	Pro-Am	MNZ	LEC	SPA; 6H; 30	SPA; 12H; 19	SPA; 24H; 16	NÜR	CAT	12th	39
2022	Iron Lynx	Ferrari 488 GT3 Evo 2020	Pro	IMO; 7	LEC; 2	SPA; 6H; 5	SPA; 12H; 11	SPA; 24H; 9	HOC; 43†	CAT; 20	10th	37
2025	AF Corse	Ferrari 296 GT3	Pro-Am	LEC	MNZ	SPA; 6H; 55	SPA; 12H; 53	SPA; 24H; 38	NÜR	CAT	NC	0
2026	AF Corse	Ferrari 296 GT3 Evo	Pro-Am	LEC	MNZ	SPA; 6H; 66†	SPA; 12H; 66†	SPA; 24H; Ret	NÜR	ALG	NC	0

=== Complete FIA World Endurance Championship results ===
(key) (Races in bold indicate pole position; races in italics indicate fastest lap)

Year	Entrant	Class	Car	Engine	1	2	3	4	5	6	7	8	9	Rank	Points
2017	Spirit of Race	LMGTE Am	Ferrari 488 GTE	Ferrari F154CB 3.9 L Turbo V8	SIL; Ret	SPA; 4		NÜR; 2	MEX; 4	COA; 3	FUJ; 1	SHA; Ret	BHR; 3	5th	97
2017	AF Corse	LMGTE Pro	Ferrari 488 GTE	Ferrari F154CB 3.9 L Turbo V8			LMS; 4							13th	32.5
2018–19	AF Corse	LMGTE Pro	Ferrari 488 GTE Evo	Ferrari F154CB 3.9 L Turbo V8	SPA	LMS; 6	SIL	FUJ	SHA	SEB; 6	SPA	LMS; Ret		20th	22
2019–20	AF Corse	LMGTE Pro	Ferrari 488 GTE Evo	Ferrari F154CB 3.9 L Turbo V8	SIL; Ret	FUJ; 5	SHA; 6	BHR; 2	COA; 5	SPA; 6	LMS; NC	BHR; 3		8th	86
2021	AF Corse	LMGTE Pro	Ferrari 488 GTE Evo	Ferrari F154CB 3.9 L Turbo V8	SPA; 3	ALG; 2	MNZ; 4	**LMS**; 10	BHR; 4	BHR; 3				4th	92
2022	AF Corse	LMGTE Pro	Ferrari 488 GTE Evo	Ferrari F154CB 3.9 L Turbo V8	SEB; 6	SPA; 3	LMS; 3	MNZ; 2	FUJ; 2	BHR; 1				3rd	131
2023	Ferrari AF Corse	Hypercar	Ferrari 499P	Ferrari F163CG 3.0 L Turbo V6	**SEB**; 3	ALG; 2	SPA; Ret	**LMS**; 4	MNZ; 2	FUJ; 4	BHR; 3			3rd	120
2024	Ferrari AF Corse	Hypercar	Ferrari 499P	Ferrari F163CG 3.0 L Turbo V6	QAT; 6	**IMO**; 4	SPA; 3	LMS; 1	SÃO; 6	COA; 3	FUJ; 9	BHR; 11		2nd	115
2025	Ferrari AF Corse	Hypercar	Ferrari 499P	Ferrari F163CG 3.0 L Turbo V6	QAT; 1	IMO; 15	**SPA**; 2	LMS; DSQ	SÃO; 12	COA; 2	FUJ; 11	BHR; 3		3rd	98
2026	Ferrari AF Corse	Hypercar	Ferrari 499P	Ferrari F163CG 3.0 L Turbo V6	IMO; 6	SPA; 3	LMS; Ret	SÃO; 7	COA; 1	FUJ; NC	CAT; 3	**MNZ**; 9		9th	72

=== Complete 24 Hours of Le Mans results ===
Year	Team	Co-Drivers	Car	Class	Laps	Pos.	Class Pos.
2017	(Italy) AF Corse	(Italy) Davide Rigon (United Kingdom) Sam Bird	Ferrari 488 GTE	GTE; Pro	339	21st	5th
2018	(Italy) AF Corse	(Italy) Davide Rigon (United Kingdom) Sam Bird	Ferrari 488 GTE Evo	GTE; Pro	338	24th	9th
2019	(Italy) AF Corse	(Italy) Davide Rigon (United Kingdom) Sam Bird	Ferrari 488 GTE Evo	GTE; Pro	140	DNF	DNF
2020	(Italy) AF Corse	(Italy) Davide Rigon (United Kingdom) Sam Bird	Ferrari 488 GTE Evo	GTE; Pro	340	NC	NC
2021	(Italy) AF Corse	(Brazil) Daniel Serra (United Kingdom) Sam Bird	Ferrari 488 GTE Evo	GTE; Pro	331	37th	5th
2022	(Italy) AF Corse	(Italy) Antonio Fuoco (Italy) Davide Rigon	Ferrari 488 GTE Evo	GTE; Pro	349	30th	**3rd**
2023	(Italy) Ferrari AF Corse	(Italy) Antonio Fuoco (Denmark) Nicklas Nielsen	Ferrari 499P	Hypercar	337	5th	5th
2024	(Italy) Ferrari AF Corse	(Italy) Antonio Fuoco (Denmark) Nicklas Nielsen	Ferrari 499P	Hypercar	311	**1st**	**1st**
2025	(Italy) Ferrari AF Corse	(Italy) Antonio Fuoco (Denmark) Nicklas Nielsen	Ferrari 499P	Hypercar	387	DSQ	DSQ
2026	(Italy) Ferrari AF Corse	(Italy) Antonio Fuoco (Denmark) Nicklas Nielsen	Ferrari 499P	Hypercar	284	DNF	DNF

=== Complete IMSA SportsCar Championship results ===
(key) (Races in bold indicate pole position; races in italics indicate fastest lap)

Year	Entrant	Class	Make	Engine	1	2	3	4	5	6	7	8	9	10	11	12	Rank	Points
2018	Risi Competizione	GTD	Ferrari 488 GT3	Ferrari F154CB 3.9 L Turbo V8	DAY; 17	SEB		MDO	DET	WGL	MOS	LIM	ELK	VIR	LGA		62nd	14
2018	Risi Competizione	GTLM	Ferrari 488 GTE	Ferrari F154CB 3.9 L Turbo V8			LBH									PET; 9	25th	22
2019	Risi Competizione	GTLM	Ferrari 488 GTE	Ferrari F154CB 3.9 L Turbo V8	DAY; 2	SEB	LBH	MDO	WGL	MOS	LIM	ELK	VIR	LGA	PET		23rd	32
2023	AF Corse	GTD	Ferrari 296 GT3	Ferrari F163CE 3.0 L Turbo V6	DAY; 19	SEB; 13	LBH	LGA									47th	337
2023	AF Corse	GTD Pro	Ferrari 296 GT3	Ferrari F163CE 3.0 L Turbo V6					WGL; 8	MOS	LIM	ELK	VIR	IMS	PET; 5		19th	537
2024	AF Corse	GTD	Ferrari 296 GT3	Ferrari F163CE 3.0 L Turbo V6	DAY; 2	SEB; 19	LBH	LGA	WGL; 6	MOS	ELK	VIR	IMS; 20	PET; 6			30th	1154
2025	DragonSpeed	GTD Pro	Ferrari 296 GT3	Ferrari F163CE 3.0 L Turbo V6	DAY; 6	SEB		LGA	DET	WGL	MOS	ELK	VIR	IMS			30th	269
2025	Cetilar Racing	GTD	Ferrari 296 GT3	Ferrari F163CE 3.0 L Turbo V6			LBH								**PET**; 10		71st	245
2026	Triarsi Competizione	GTD Pro	Ferrari 296 GT3 Evo	Ferrari F163CE 3.0 L Turbo V6	DAY; 8	SEB; 7	LGA	DET	WGL	MOS	ELK	VIR	IMS	PET; 13			20th	707

=== Complete European Le Mans Series results ===
Year	Entrant	Class	Chassis	Engine	1	2	3	4	5	6	Rank	Points
2018	JMW Motorsport	LMGTE	Ferrari 488 GTE	Ferrari F154CB 3.9 L Turbo V8	LEC; 1	MNZ; 4	**RBR**; Ret	SIL; 1	SPA; 4‡	**ALG**; 2	2nd	88
2021	Iron Lynx	LMGTE	Ferrari 488 GTE Evo	Ferrari F154CB 3.9 L Turbo V8	CAT; 1	RBR; 3	LEC; 1	MNZ; 2	SPA; 2	POR; 1	1st	126
2022	JMW Motorsport	LMGTE	Ferrari 488 GTE Evo	Ferrari F154CB 3.9 L Turbo V8	LEC	IMO	MNZ	CAT; 3	SPA	POR	19th	15
2025	Kessel Racing	LMGT3	Ferrari 296 GT3	Ferrari F163CE 3.0 L Turbo V6	CAT; 10	LEC; Ret	IMO; 2	SPA; 9	SIL; 7	ALG; 12	12th	27

^{‡} Half points awarded as less than 75% of race distance was completed.

=== Complete Asian Le Mans Series results ===
Year	Team	Class	Chassis	Engine	1	2	3	4	Rank	Points
2023	AF Corse	GT	Ferrari 488 GT3 Evo 2020	Ferrari F154CB 3.9 L Turbo V8	DUB; 1; 9	DUB; 2; 3	ABU; 1 Ret	ABU; 2; 7	7th	23

Sporting positions
Preceded by Michael Cooper; Jordan Taylor	SprintX GT Championship Series; Champion; 2018; With: Toni Vilander	Succeeded by None (Series ended)
Preceded by Michele Beretta; Alessio Picariello; Christian Ried	European Le Mans Series; LMGTE Champion; 2021; With: Matteo Cressoni & Rino Mastronardi	Succeeded by Gianmaria Bruni; Christian Ried; Lorenzo Ferrari
Preceded by James Calado; Antonio Giovinazzi; Alessandro Pier Guidi	Winner of the 24 Hours of Le Mans; 2024; With: Antonio Fuoco & Nicklas Nielsen	Succeeded by Phil Hanson; Robert Kubica; Yifei Ye
