= 2022 4 Hours of Imola =

Endurance sportscar racing event

The layout of the Autodromo Enzo e Dino Ferrari

The 2022 4 Hours of Imola was an endurance sportscar racing event that was held on 15 May 2022, as the second round of the 2022 European Le Mans Series. This was the first race at the Autodromo Internazionale Enzo e Dino Ferrari since the 2016 season.

The race was won by the #9 Prema Racing run Oreca 07, driven by Louis Delétraz, Ferdinand Habsburg and Lorenzo Colombo. The podium was completed by #22 United Autosports and #37 Cool Racing entries. First in LMP3 was the #3 United Autosports run Ligier JS P320, driven by Andrew Bentley and Kay van Berlo. #69 Oman Racing with TF Sport Aston Martin Vantage AMR claimed the LMGTE win driven by Ahmad Al Harthy, Sam De Haan and Marco Sørensen.

== Qualifying ==
=== Qualifying Result ===
Pole position in each class are marked in bold.

Pos	Class	No.	Team	Time	Grid
1	**LMP2 Pro-Am**	**88**	**(Italy) AF Corse**	**1:32.269**	1
2	LMP2 Pro-Am	31	(France) TDS Racing x Vaillante	1:32.613	2
3	**LMP2**	**9**	**(Italy) Prema Racing**	**1:32.701**	3
4	LMP2	37	(Switzerland) Cool Racing	1:32.783	4
5	LMP2	65	(France) Panis Racing	1:32.832	5
6	LMP2	22	(United Kingdom) United Autosports	1:32.837	6
7	LMP2 Pro-Am	47	(Portugal) Algarve Pro Racing	1:32.852	7
8	LMP2 Pro-Am	34	Racing Team Turkey	1:32.900	8
9	LMP2	28	(France) IDEC Sport	1:33.027	9
10	LMP2	30	(France) Duqueine Team	1:33.039	10
11	LMP2	21	(Belgium) Mühlner Motorsport	1:33.269	11
12	LMP2	43	(Poland) Inter Europol Competition	1:33.308	12
13	LMP2 Pro-Am	40	(France) Graff Racing	1:33.358	13
14	LMP2 Pro-Am	51	(Poland) Team Virage	1:33.418	14
15	LMP2	19	(Portugal) Algarve Pro Racing	1:33.556	15
16	LMP2	35	(United Kingdom) BHK Motorsport	1:33.902	16
17	**LMP3**	**17**	**(Switzerland) Cool Racing**	**1:37.182**	17
18	LMP3	4	(Luxembourg) DKR Engineering	1:37.674	18
19	LMP3	14	(Poland) Inter Europol Competition	1:37.749	19
20	LMP3	2	(United Kingdom) United Autosports	1:37.998	20
21	LMP3	27	(Switzerland) Cool Racing	1:38.017	21
22	LMP3	13	(Poland) Inter Europol Competition	1:38.156	22
23	LMP3	15	(United Kingdom) RLR Msport	1:38.246	23
24	LMP3	5	(United Kingdom) RLR Msport	1:38.452	24
25	LMP3	10	(Italy) EuroInternational	1:38.463	25
26	LMP3	11	(Italy) EuroInternational	1:38.471	26
27	LMP3	3	(United Kingdom) United Autosports	1:38.517	27
28	LMP3	7	(United Kingdom) Nielsen Racing	1:38.823	28
29	LMP3	6	(United Kingdom) 360 Racing	1:38.906	29
30	**LMGTE**	**69**	**Oman Racing with TF Sport**	**1:41.974**	30
32	LMGTE	83	(Italy) Iron Lynx	1:42.357	32
31	LMGTE	18	(Hong Kong) Absolute Racing	1:42.926	31
33	LMGTE	32	(Germany) Rinaldi Racing	1:43.075	33
34	LMGTE	66	(United Kingdom) JMW Motorsport	1:43.150	34
35	LMGTE	57	(Switzerland) Kessel Racing	1:43.419	35
36	LMGTE	55	(Switzerland) Spirit of Race	1:43.502	36
37	LMGTE	77	(Germany) Proton Competition	1:43.616	37
39	LMGTE	93	(Germany) Proton Competition	1:44.336	39
38	LMGTE	33	(Germany) Rinaldi Racing	1:44.560	38
40	LMGTE	95	Oman Racing with TF Sport	1:45.449	40
41	LMGTE	60	(Italy) Iron Lynx	1:45.485	41
42	LMP2 Pro-Am	24	(United Kingdom) Nielsen Racing	—	42

== Race ==
=== Race Result ===
Class winners are marked in bold and ‡. - Cars failing to complete 70% of the winner's distance are marked as Not Classified (NC).

Pos.	Class	No.	Team	Drivers	Chassis	Tyre	Laps	Time/Retired
Pos.	Class	No.	Team	Drivers	Engine	Tyre	Laps	Time/Retired
1	**LMP2**	**9**	**(Italy) Prema Racing**	**(Italy) Lorenzo Colombo** **(Switzerland) Louis Delétraz** **(Austria) Ferdinand Habsburg**	**Oreca 07**	G	**127**	**4:00:39.273‡**
1	**LMP2**	**9**	**(Italy) Prema Racing**	**(Italy) Lorenzo Colombo** **(Switzerland) Louis Delétraz** **(Austria) Ferdinand Habsburg**	**Gibson GK428 4.2 L V8**	G	**127**	**4:00:39.273‡**
2	LMP2	22	(United Kingdom) United Autosports	(United Kingdom) Philip Hanson (United Kingdom) Tom Gamble (United Kingdom) Duncan Tappy	Oreca 07	G	127	+4.659
2	LMP2	22	(United Kingdom) United Autosports	(United Kingdom) Philip Hanson (United Kingdom) Tom Gamble (United Kingdom) Duncan Tappy	Gibson GK428 4.2 L V8	G	127	+4.659
3	LMP2	37	(Switzerland) Cool Racing	(France) Nicolas Lapierre (Germany) Niklas Krütten (China) Ye Yifei	Oreca 07	G	127	+29.182
3	LMP2	37	(Switzerland) Cool Racing	(France) Nicolas Lapierre (Germany) Niklas Krütten (China) Ye Yifei	Gibson GK428 4.2 L V8	G	127	+29.182
4	LMP2	65	(France) Panis Racing	(France) Julien Canal (France) Nico Jamin (Netherlands) Job van Uitert	Oreca 07	G	127	+29.981
4	LMP2	65	(France) Panis Racing	(France) Julien Canal (France) Nico Jamin (Netherlands) Job van Uitert	Gibson GK428 4.2 L V8	G	127	+29.981
5	LMP2	28	(France) IDEC Sport	(France) Paul Lafargue (France) Paul-Loup Chatin (France) Patrick Pilet	Oreca 07	G	127	+1:04.130
5	LMP2	28	(France) IDEC Sport	(France) Paul Lafargue (France) Paul-Loup Chatin (France) Patrick Pilet	Gibson GK428 4.2 L V8	G	127	+1:04.130
6	LMP2	30	(France) Duqueine Team	(Mexico) Memo Rojas (France) Mathieu de Barbuat (United Kingdom) Richard Bradley	Oreca 07	G	127	+1:28.794
6	LMP2	30	(France) Duqueine Team	(Mexico) Memo Rojas (France) Mathieu de Barbuat (United Kingdom) Richard Bradley	Gibson GK428 4.2 L V8	G	127	+1:28.794
7	**LMP2 Pro-Am**	**34**	**Racing Team Turkey**	**(Turkey) Salih Yoluç** **(Republic of Ireland) Charlie Eastwood** **(United Kingdom) Will Stevens**	**Oreca 07**	G	**127**	**+1:29.192‡**
7	**LMP2 Pro-Am**	**34**	**Racing Team Turkey**	**(Turkey) Salih Yoluç** **(Republic of Ireland) Charlie Eastwood** **(United Kingdom) Will Stevens**	**Gibson GK428 4.2 L V8**	G	**127**	**+1:29.192‡**
8	LMP2	19	(Portugal) Algarve Pro Racing	(Romania) Filip Ugran (Netherlands) Bent Viscaal	Oreca 07	G	126	+1 Lap
8	LMP2	19	(Portugal) Algarve Pro Racing	(Romania) Filip Ugran (Netherlands) Bent Viscaal	Gibson GK428 4.2 L V8	G	126	+1 Lap
9	LMP2	43	(Poland) Inter Europol Competition	(Switzerland) Fabio Scherer (Brazil) Pietro Fittipaldi (Denmark) David Heinemeier Hansson	Oreca 07	G	126	+1 Lap
9	LMP2	43	(Poland) Inter Europol Competition	(Switzerland) Fabio Scherer (Brazil) Pietro Fittipaldi (Denmark) David Heinemeier Hansson	Gibson GK428 4.2 L V8	G	126	+1 Lap
10	LMP2 Pro-Am	31	(France) TDS Racing x Vaillante	(France) Philippe Cimadomo (Switzerland) Mathias Beche (Netherlands) Tijmen van der Helm	Oreca 07	G	125	+2 Laps
10	LMP2 Pro-Am	31	(France) TDS Racing x Vaillante	(France) Philippe Cimadomo (Switzerland) Mathias Beche (Netherlands) Tijmen van der Helm	Gibson GK428 4.2 L V8	G	125	+2 Laps
11	LMP2	21	(Belgium) Mühlner Motorsport	(Liechtenstein) Matthias Kaiser (France) Thomas Laurent (Belgium) Ugo de Wilde	Oreca 07	G	125	+2 Laps
11	LMP2	21	(Belgium) Mühlner Motorsport	(Liechtenstein) Matthias Kaiser (France) Thomas Laurent (Belgium) Ugo de Wilde	Gibson GK428 4.2 L V8	G	125	+2 Laps
12	LMP2 Pro-Am	24	(United Kingdom) Nielsen Racing	(United States) Rodrigo Sales (United Kingdom) Matt Bell (United Kingdom) Ben Hanley	Oreca 07	G	125	+2 Laps
12	LMP2 Pro-Am	24	(United Kingdom) Nielsen Racing	(United States) Rodrigo Sales (United Kingdom) Matt Bell (United Kingdom) Ben Hanley	Gibson GK428 4.2 L V8	G	125	+2 Laps
13	LMP2 Pro-Am	40	(France) Graff Racing	(Switzerland) David Droux (Switzerland) Sébastien Page (France) Eric Trouillet	Oreca 07	G	124	+3 Laps
13	LMP2 Pro-Am	40	(France) Graff Racing	(Switzerland) David Droux (Switzerland) Sébastien Page (France) Eric Trouillet	Gibson GK428 4.2 L V8	G	124	+3 Laps
14	LMP2 Pro-Am	88	(Italy) AF Corse	(France) François Perrodo (Denmark) Nicklas Nielsen (Italy) Alessio Rovera	Oreca 07	G	123	+4 Laps
14	LMP2 Pro-Am	88	(Italy) AF Corse	(France) François Perrodo (Denmark) Nicklas Nielsen (Italy) Alessio Rovera	Gibson GK428 4.2 L V8	G	123	+4 Laps
15	LMP2 Pro-Am	47	(Portugal) Algarve Pro Racing	(United States) John Falb (Australia) James Allen (Australia) Alex Peroni	Oreca 07	G	123	+4 Laps
15	LMP2 Pro-Am	47	(Portugal) Algarve Pro Racing	(United States) John Falb (Australia) James Allen (Australia) Alex Peroni	Gibson GK428 4.2 L V8	G	123	+4 Laps
16	**LMP3**	**3**	**(United Kingdom) United Autosports**	**(Netherlands) Kay van Berlo** **(United Kingdom) Andrew Bentley**	**Ligier JS P320**	M	**123**	**+4 Laps‡**
16	**LMP3**	**3**	**(United Kingdom) United Autosports**	**(Netherlands) Kay van Berlo** **(United Kingdom) Andrew Bentley**	**Nissan VK56DE 5.6 L V8**	M	**123**	**+4 Laps‡**
17	LMP2	35	(United Kingdom) BHK Motorsport	(Italy) Francesco Dracone (Italy) Sergio Campana (Germany) Markus Pommer	Oreca 07	G	122	+5 Laps
17	LMP2	35	(United Kingdom) BHK Motorsport	(Italy) Francesco Dracone (Italy) Sergio Campana (Germany) Markus Pommer	Gibson GK428 4.2 L V8	G	122	+5 Laps
18	LMP3	27	(Switzerland) Cool Racing	(Switzerland) Nicolas Maulini (France) Jean-Ludovic Foubert (France) Antoine Doquin	Ligier JS P320	M	122	+5 Laps
18	LMP3	27	(Switzerland) Cool Racing	(Switzerland) Nicolas Maulini (France) Jean-Ludovic Foubert (France) Antoine Doquin	Nissan VK56DE 5.6 L V8	M	122	+5 Laps
19	LMP3	17	(Switzerland) Cool Racing	(United States) Maurice Smith (United Kingdom) Mike Benham (Denmark) Malthe Jakobsen	Ligier JS P320	M	122	+5 Laps
19	LMP3	17	(Switzerland) Cool Racing	(United States) Maurice Smith (United Kingdom) Mike Benham (Denmark) Malthe Jakobsen	Nissan VK56DE 5.6 L V8	M	122	+5 Laps
20	**LMGTE**	**69**	**Oman Racing with TF Sport**	**(Oman) Ahmad Al Harthy** **(Denmark) Marco Sørensen** **(United Kingdom) Sam De Haan**	**Aston Martin Vantage AMR**	G	**121**	**+6 Laps‡**
20	**LMGTE**	**69**	**Oman Racing with TF Sport**	**(Oman) Ahmad Al Harthy** **(Denmark) Marco Sørensen** **(United Kingdom) Sam De Haan**	**Aston Martin 4.0 L Turbo V8**	G	**121**	**+6 Laps‡**
21	LMP3	5	(United Kingdom) RLR MSport	(Denmark) Michael Jensen (United Kingdom) Nick Adcock (United Kingdom) Alex Kapadia	Ligier JS P320	M	121	+6 Laps
21	LMP3	5	(United Kingdom) RLR MSport	(Denmark) Michael Jensen (United Kingdom) Nick Adcock (United Kingdom) Alex Kapadia	Nissan VK56DE 5.6 L V8	M	121	+6 Laps
22	LMGTE	95	Oman Racing with TF Sport	(United Kingdom) John Hartshorne (Portugal) Henrique Chaves (United Kingdom) Jonathan Adam	Aston Martin Vantage AMR	G	120	+7 Laps
22	LMGTE	95	Oman Racing with TF Sport	(United Kingdom) John Hartshorne (Portugal) Henrique Chaves (United Kingdom) Jonathan Adam	Aston Martin 4.0 L Turbo V8	G	120	+7 Laps
23	LMGTE	55	(Switzerland) Spirit of Race	(United Kingdom) Duncan Cameron (Republic of Ireland) Matt Griffin (South Africa) David Perel	Ferrari 488 GTE Evo	G	120	+7 Laps
23	LMGTE	55	(Switzerland) Spirit of Race	(United Kingdom) Duncan Cameron (Republic of Ireland) Matt Griffin (South Africa) David Perel	Ferrari F154CB 3.9 L Turbo V8	G	120	+7 Laps
24	LMGTE	66	(United Kingdom) JMW Motorsport	(Italy) Giacorno Petrobelli (Singapore) Sean Hudspeth (New Zealand) Matthew Payne	Ferrari 488 GTE Evo	G	120	+7 Laps
24	LMGTE	66	(United Kingdom) JMW Motorsport	(Italy) Giacorno Petrobelli (Singapore) Sean Hudspeth (New Zealand) Matthew Payne	Ferrari F154CB 3.9 L Turbo V8	G	120	+7 Laps
25	LMP3	4	(Luxembourg) DKR Engineering	(Mexico) Sebastián Álvarez (United Arab Emirates) Alexander Bukhantsov (Belgium) Tom van Rompuy	Duqueine M30 – D08	M	119	+8 Laps
25	LMP3	4	(Luxembourg) DKR Engineering	(Mexico) Sebastián Álvarez (United Arab Emirates) Alexander Bukhantsov (Belgium) Tom van Rompuy	Nissan VK56DE 5.6 L V8	M	119	+8 Laps
26	LMGTE	60	(Italy) Iron Lynx	(Italy) Claudio Schiavoni (Italy) Matteo Cressoni (Italy) Davide Rigon	Ferrari 488 GTE Evo	G	119	+8 Laps
26	LMGTE	60	(Italy) Iron Lynx	(Italy) Claudio Schiavoni (Italy) Matteo Cressoni (Italy) Davide Rigon	Ferrari F154CB 3.9 L Turbo V8	G	119	+8 Laps
27	LMGTE	33	(Germany) Rinaldi Racing	(Germany) Christian Hook (Colombia) Óscar Tunjo (Italy) Fabrizio Crestani	Ferrari 488 GTE Evo	G	118	+9 Laps
27	LMGTE	33	(Germany) Rinaldi Racing	(Germany) Christian Hook (Colombia) Óscar Tunjo (Italy) Fabrizio Crestani	Ferrari F154CB 3.9 L Turbo V8	G	118	+9 Laps
28	LMGTE	93	(Germany) Proton Competition	(Republic of Ireland) Michael Fassbender (Canada) Zacharie Robichon (Austria) Richard Lietz	Porsche 911 RSR-19	G	107	+20 Laps
28	LMGTE	93	(Germany) Proton Competition	(Republic of Ireland) Michael Fassbender (Canada) Zacharie Robichon (Austria) Richard Lietz	Porsche 4.2 L Flat-6	G	107	+20 Laps
29	LMGTE	83	(Italy) Iron Lynx	(Switzerland) Rahel Frey (Denmark) Michelle Gatting (Belgium) Sarah Bovy	Ferrari 488 GTE Evo	G	107	+20 Laps
29	LMGTE	83	(Italy) Iron Lynx	(Switzerland) Rahel Frey (Denmark) Michelle Gatting (Belgium) Sarah Bovy	Ferrari F154CB 3.9 L Turbo V8	G	107	+20 Laps
30	LMP3	15	(United Kingdom) RLR MSport	(Austria) Horst Felbemayr Jr. (Germany) Valentino Catalano (United States) Austin McCusker	Ligier JS P320	M	106	+21 Laps
30	LMP3	15	(United Kingdom) RLR MSport	(Austria) Horst Felbemayr Jr. (Germany) Valentino Catalano (United States) Austin McCusker	Nissan VK56DE 5.6 L V8	M	106	+21 Laps
31	LMP3	11	(Italy) Eurointernational	(Netherlands) Max Koebolt (Argentina) Marcos Siebert (Switzerland) Jérôme de Sadeleer	Ligier JS P320	M	106	+21 Laps
31	LMP3	11	(Italy) Eurointernational	(Netherlands) Max Koebolt (Argentina) Marcos Siebert (Switzerland) Jérôme de Sadeleer	Nissan VK56DE 5.6 L V8	M	106	+21 Laps
32	LMP3	13	(Poland) Inter Europol Competition	(United States) Charles Crews (Chile) Nico Pino (Portugal) Guilherme Oliveira	Ligier JS P320	M	99	+28 Laps
32	LMP3	13	(Poland) Inter Europol Competition	(United States) Charles Crews (Chile) Nico Pino (Portugal) Guilherme Oliveira	Nissan VK56DE 5.6 L V8	M	99	+28 Laps
DNF	LMP3	14	(Poland) Inter Europol Competition	(France) Noam Abramczyk (Poland) Mateusz Kaprzyk (Canada) James Dayson	Ligier JS P320	M	118	Throttle sensor
DNF	LMP3	14	(Poland) Inter Europol Competition	(France) Noam Abramczyk (Poland) Mateusz Kaprzyk (Canada) James Dayson	Nissan VK56DE 5.6 L V8	M	118	Throttle sensor
DNF	LMP2 Pro-Am	51	(Poland) Team Virage	(United States) Rob Hodes (France) Gabriel Aubry (Guatemala) Ian Rodríguez	Oreca 07	G	87	Retired
DNF	LMP2 Pro-Am	51	(Poland) Team Virage	(United States) Rob Hodes (France) Gabriel Aubry (Guatemala) Ian Rodríguez	Gibson GK428 4.2 L V8	G	87	Retired
DNF	LMP3	7	(United Kingdom) Nielsen Racing	(United Kingdom) Anthony Wells (United Kingdom) James Littlejohn	Ligier JS P320	M	66	Radiator
DNF	LMP3	7	(United Kingdom) Nielsen Racing	(United Kingdom) Anthony Wells (United Kingdom) James Littlejohn	Nissan VK56DE 5.6 L V8	M	66	Radiator
DNF	LMP3	2	(United Kingdom) United Autosports	(United Kingdom) Bailey Voisin (United Kingdom) Josh Caygill (Germany) Finn Gehrsitz	Ligier JS P320	M	44	Did not finish
DNF	LMP3	2	(United Kingdom) United Autosports	(United Kingdom) Bailey Voisin (United Kingdom) Josh Caygill (Germany) Finn Gehrsitz	Nissan VK56DE 5.6 L V8	M	44	Did not finish
DNF	LMGTE	18	(Hong Kong) Absolute Racing	(Indonesia) Andrew Haryanto (Estonia) Martin Rump (Belgium) Alessio Picariello	Porsche 911 RSR-19	G	37	Retired
DNF	LMGTE	18	(Hong Kong) Absolute Racing	(Indonesia) Andrew Haryanto (Estonia) Martin Rump (Belgium) Alessio Picariello	Porsche 4.2 L Flat-6	G	37	Retired
DNF	LMP3	10	(Italy) Eurointernational	(Spain) Xavier Lloveras (Netherlands) Glenn van Berlo (France) Adrien Chila	Ligier JS P320	M	27	Did not finish
DNF	LMP3	10	(Italy) Eurointernational	(Spain) Xavier Lloveras (Netherlands) Glenn van Berlo (France) Adrien Chila	Nissan VK56DE 5.6 L V8	M	27	Did not finish
DNF	LMGTE	32	(Germany) Rinaldi Racing	(Germany) Pierre Ehret (Argentina) Nicolás Varrone (Italy) Gabriele Lancieri	Ferrari 488 GTE Evo	G	19	Crash
DNF	LMGTE	32	(Germany) Rinaldi Racing	(Germany) Pierre Ehret (Argentina) Nicolás Varrone (Italy) Gabriele Lancieri	Ferrari F154CB 3.9 L Turbo V8	G	19	Crash
DNF	LMGTE	77	(Germany) Proton Competition	(Germany) Christian Ried (Italy) Lorenzo Ferrari (Italy) Gianmaria Bruni	Porsche 911 RSR-19	G	11	Did not finish
DNF	LMGTE	77	(Germany) Proton Competition	(Germany) Christian Ried (Italy) Lorenzo Ferrari (Italy) Gianmaria Bruni	Porsche 4.2 L Flat-6	G	11	Did not finish
DNF	LMP3	6	(United Kingdom) 360 Racing	(United Kingdom) Terrence Woodward (United Kingdom) Ross Kaiser (United Kingdom) Mark Richards	Ligier JS P320	M	4	Did not finish
DNF	LMP3	6	(United Kingdom) 360 Racing	(United Kingdom) Terrence Woodward (United Kingdom) Ross Kaiser (United Kingdom) Mark Richards	Nissan VK56DE 5.6 L V8	M	4	Did not finish
DSQ	LMGTE	57	(Switzerland) Kessel Racing	(Japan) Takeshi Kimura (Denmark) Frederik Schandorff (Denmark) Mikkel Jensen	Ferrari 488 GTE Evo	G	120	Disqualified
DSQ	LMGTE	57	(Switzerland) Kessel Racing	(Japan) Takeshi Kimura (Denmark) Frederik Schandorff (Denmark) Mikkel Jensen	Ferrari F154CB 3.9 L Turbo V8	G	120	Disqualified

European Le Mans Series
Previous race: 4 Hours of Le Castellet	2022 season	Next race: 4 Hours of Monza
