= 2011 Deutsche Tourenwagen Masters =

German motorsport season

Champions
- Drivers' Champion: Martin Tomczyk
- Teams' Champion: Abt Sportsline

Seasons
- ← 2010 2012 →

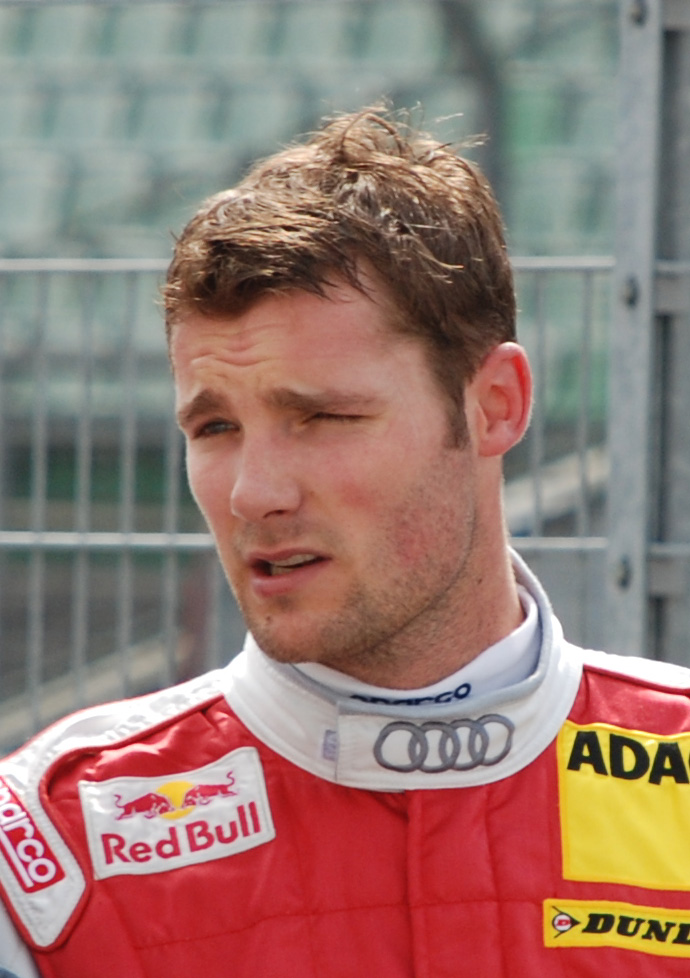
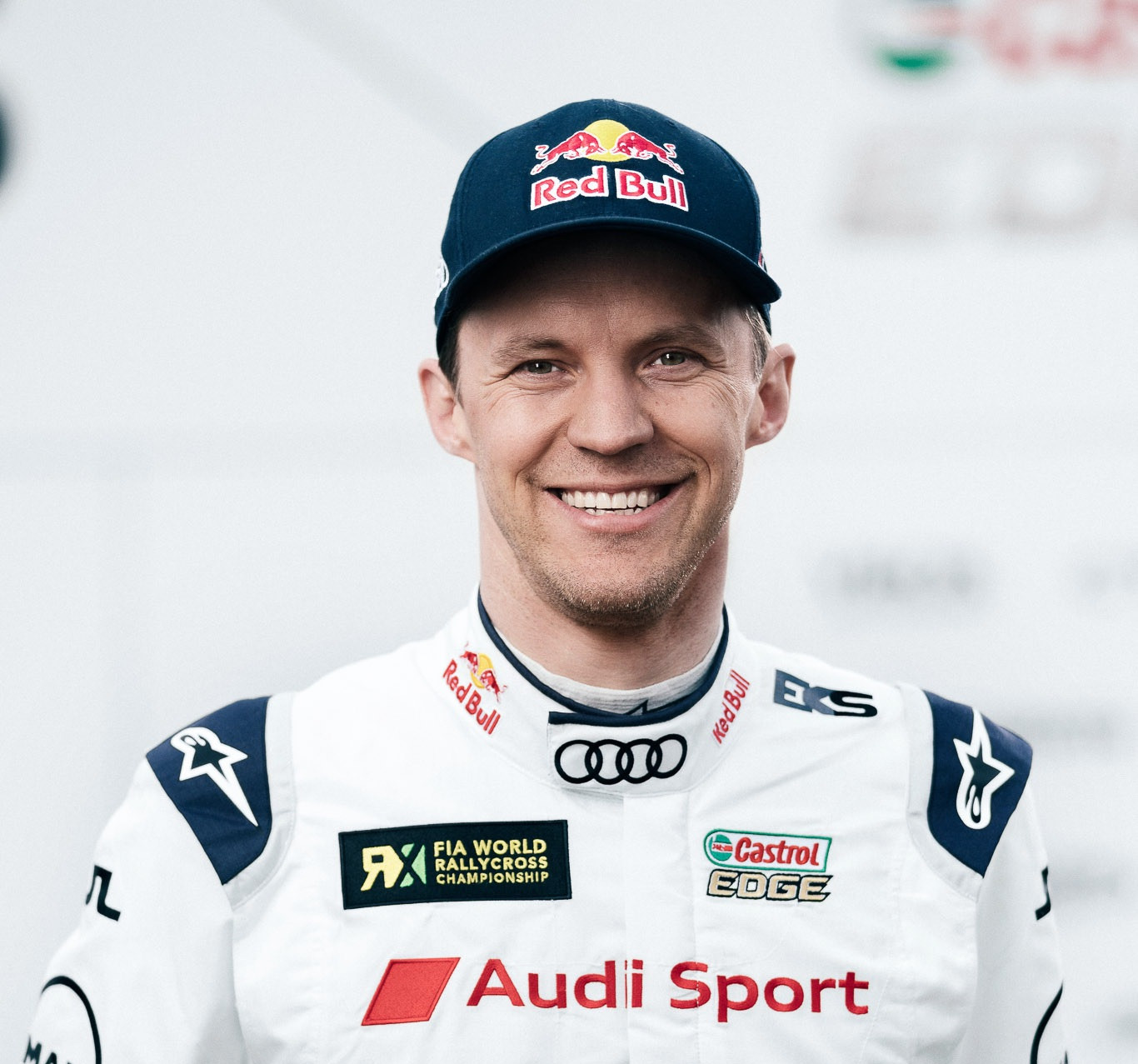
Martin Tomczyk (left) won his first Drivers' Championship while Mattias Ekström (right) finished second in the championship.

The 2011 Deutsche Tourenwagen Masters season was a multi-event motor racing series largely based in Germany for highly modified touring car racing cars and is one of the most popular sedan car-based motor racing series in the world. The series features professional racing teams and drivers and is heavily supported by car manufacturers Audi and Mercedes-Benz. Each race features 18 V8-powered racing cars built according to the technical regulations of the Deutsche Tourenwagen Masters (DTM). It was the twenty-fifth season of premier German touring car championship and also twelfth season under the moniker of DTM since the series' resumption in 2000. It was the final season running the 4-door saloon-style spec cars, which has been the series' sole car style requirements since 2005 (although 4-door saloon-style spec cars were introduced majorly in 2004 but few coupé cars were also featured due to cost reasons). It was also the final season that all DTM cars ran with the sequential manual gearbox shifters before all DTM cars switched to sequential semi-automatic paddle-shifters for the following season.

Canadian Mercedes-Benz driver Bruno Spengler led the series after five races. After winning the season-opening Hockenheim and the most recent race at the Norisring, Spengler held a three-point lead over German Audi driver Martin Tomczyk who won races at the Red Bull Ring and Lausitzring. The two held a points gap over third-placed Audi driver Timo Scheider. The other race winner was Audi driver Mike Rockenfeller, although after his Le Mans sportscar accident Rockenfeller had to take a break from DTM to recover with series veteran Tom Kristensen replacing him.

== Series news ==
- Previous sole tyre supplier Dunlop announced on 19 November 2010 that it would not renew its contract with DTM after 2010 season, with Hankook was chosen as the sole tyre supplier for 2011-2013 seasons by the DMSB, ITR e.V. and FIA as it was announced on 17 January 2011 and thus carrying the Hankook Ventus brand as a preparation for new car regulations from 2012 onwards. The front and rear tyre sizes of Hankook Ventus DTM tyres for 2011 season would almost remained same sizes as previous Dunlop SP Sport Maxx DTM tyres but the front tyre width slightly reduced (260/660-R18 (10.2/25.9-R18) on fronts and 280/660-R18 (11.0/25.9-R18) on rears).
- The development freeze introduced for the 2010 season remains in place for the 2011 season.

== Teams and drivers ==
The following manufacturers, teams and drivers competed in the 2011 Deutsche Tourenwagen Masters. All teams competed with tyres supplied by Hankook.

Manufacturer	Car	Team	No.	Drivers	Rounds
Mercedes-Benz	AMG-Mercedes C-Klasse 2009	HWA Team	2	(United Kingdom) Gary Paffett	All
Mercedes-Benz	AMG-Mercedes C-Klasse 2009	HWA Team	3	(Canada) Bruno Spengler	All
Mercedes-Benz	AMG-Mercedes C-Klasse 2009	HWA Team	6	(Germany) Ralf Schumacher	All
Mercedes-Benz	AMG-Mercedes C-Klasse 2009	HWA Team	7	(United Kingdom) Jamie Green	All
Mercedes-Benz	AMG-Mercedes C-Klasse 2008	Persson Motorsport	10	(United Kingdom) Susie Stoddart (United Kingdom) Susie Wolff	1–9; 10
Mercedes-Benz	AMG-Mercedes C-Klasse 2008	Persson Motorsport	11	(Germany) Christian Vietoris	All
Mercedes-Benz	AMG-Mercedes C-Klasse 2008	Persson Motorsport	20	(Netherlands) Renger van der Zande	All
Mercedes-Benz	AMG-Mercedes C-Klasse 2008	Mücke Motorsport	16	(Germany) Maro Engel	All
Mercedes-Benz	AMG-Mercedes C-Klasse 2008	Mücke Motorsport	17	(United Kingdom) David Coulthard	All
Audi	Audi A4 DTM 2009	Abt Sportsline	4	(Germany) Timo Scheider	All
Audi	Audi A4 DTM 2009	Abt Sportsline	5	(United Kingdom) Oliver Jarvis	All
Audi	Audi A4 DTM 2009	Abt Sportsline	8	(Sweden) Mattias Ekström	All
Audi	Audi A4 DTM 2009	Abt Sportsline	9	(Germany) Mike Rockenfeller	1–3, 5–10
Audi	Audi A4 DTM 2009	Abt Sportsline	9	(Denmark) Tom Kristensen	4
Audi	Audi A4 DTM 2008	Abt Sportsline	22	(Spain) Miguel Molina	All
Audi	Audi A4 DTM 2008	Team Phoenix	14	(Germany) Martin Tomczyk	All
Audi	Audi A4 DTM 2008	Team Phoenix	15	(Switzerland) Rahel Frey	All
Audi	Audi A4 DTM 2008	Team Rosberg	18	(Portugal) Filipe Albuquerque	All
Audi	Audi A4 DTM 2008	Team Rosberg	19	(Italy) Edoardo Mortara	All

=== Driver changes ===
Changed teams

Mike Rockenfeller moved into the factory Team Abt Sportsline outfit, driving a latest-specification car for the first time. He replaced Martin Tomczyk who filled Rockenfeller's vacant drive at Team Phoenix. With Paul di Resta leaving the HWA Team for Force India in Formula One, Jamie Green took over his spot in a latest-specification Mercedes.

Entering DTM

Team Rosberg had two new drivers for the 2011 season, with reigning Formula 3 Euro Series champion Edoardo Mortara and Race of Champions winner Filipe Albuquerque driving. Rahel Frey competed for Team Phoenix after selected drives in various series in 2010. Single-seater racers Christian Vietoris and Renger van der Zande both competed for Persson Motorsport; van der Zande moving from GP3, while Vietoris combining his DTM programme with a season in GP2.

Leaving DTM

Reigning champion Paul di Resta did not defend his title with the HWA Team, having moved into a Formula One drive with Force India. Audi driver Markus Winkelhock moved into the FIA GT1 World Championship with Münnich Motorsport, while fellow Audi drivers Alexandre Prémat and Katherine Legge lost their drives in the series.

== Race calendar and results ==
The series hosted its first stadium event in July for a round at Munich's Olympic Stadium. The event did not count for points but the entire grid took part over two days. A twelve-race provisional calendar was announced on 29 September, including the non-championship event in Munich, and a return to the newly renamed Red Bull Ring, replacing Adria. The calendar was reduced to eleven races on 1 April, after the race in Shanghai was dropped. The Chinese motorsport authorities did not want an event clash with the inaugural Chinese round of the World Touring Car Championship due to be held on the same day at the Guangdong International Circuit.

Round	Circuit	Date	Pole position	Fastest lap	Winning driver	Winning team
1	(Germany) Hockenheimring	1 May	(Canada) Bruno Spengler	(Canada) Bruno Spengler	(Canada) Bruno Spengler	HWA Team
2	(Netherlands) Circuit Park Zandvoort	15 May	(Canada) Bruno Spengler	(Germany) Mike Rockenfeller	(Germany) Mike Rockenfeller	Abt Sportsline
3	(Austria) Red Bull Ring, Spielberg	5 June	(Germany) Martin Tomczyk	(Canada) Bruno Spengler	(Germany) Martin Tomczyk	Team Phoenix
4	(Germany) Lausitzring	19 June	(Canada) Bruno Spengler	(Germany) Timo Scheider	(Germany) Martin Tomczyk	Team Phoenix
5	(Germany) Norisring, Nuremberg	3 July	(Canada) Bruno Spengler	(United Kingdom) Jamie Green	(Canada) Bruno Spengler	HWA Team
NC	(Germany) Showevent Olympiastadion München	16 July	Inter-marque races		(Italy) Edoardo Mortara	Team Rosberg
NC	(Germany) Showevent Olympiastadion München	17 July	Knockout races		(Canada) Bruno Spengler	HWA Team
6	(Germany) Nürburgring	7 August	(Sweden) Mattias Ekström	(United Kingdom) David Coulthard	(Sweden) Mattias Ekström	Abt Sportsline
7	(United Kingdom) Brands Hatch, Kent	4 September	(Germany) Mike Rockenfeller	(Germany) Martin Tomczyk	(Germany) Martin Tomczyk	Team Phoenix
8	(Germany) Motorsport Arena Oschersleben	18 September	(Spain) Miguel Molina	(Sweden) Mattias Ekström	(Sweden) Mattias Ekström	Abt Sportsline
9	(Spain) Circuit Ricardo Tormo, Valencia	2 October	(Sweden) Mattias Ekström	(Germany) Timo Scheider	(Sweden) Mattias Ekström	Abt Sportsline
10	(Germany) Hockenheimring	23 October	(Spain) Miguel Molina	(United Kingdom) Jamie Green	(United Kingdom) Jamie Green	HWA Team

== Championship standings ==
=== Drivers' Championship ===
Pos	Driver	HOC (Germany)	ZAN (Netherlands)	RBR (Austria)	LAU (Germany)	NOR (Germany)	OLY (Note: Non-championship race. No points awarded.) (Germany)		NÜR (Germany)	BRH (United Kingdom)	OSC (Germany)	VAL (Spain)	HOC (Germany)	Points
1	(Germany) Martin Tomczyk	5	3	**1**	1	3	13	7	5	1	2	3	2	72
2	(Sweden) Mattias Ekström	2	8	Ret	11	7	7	6	**1**	2	1	**1**	6	52
3	(Canada) Bruno Spengler	**1**	**2**	4	**3**	**1**	2	1	2	7	13†	7	9	51
4	(Germany) Timo Scheider	4	5	7	2	4	14	13	4	16	Ret	4	7	36
5	(United Kingdom) Jamie Green	7	4	6	6	2	9	8	6	8	11	10	1	35
6	(Germany) Mike Rockenfeller	11	1	5		14	3	10	3	**6**	6	9	4	31
7	(United Kingdom) Gary Paffett	6	9	8	4	Ret	10	11	8	4	4	8	5	25
8	(Germany) Ralf Schumacher	3	11	2	12	6	5	16	Ret	5	Ret	13	11	21
9	(Italy) Edoardo Mortara	14	6	16	Ret	5	1	2	7	3	3	16†	13	21
10	(United Kingdom) Oliver Jarvis	9	10	3	5	15	8	15	10	9	9	6	8	14
11	(Spain) Miguel Molina	16	14	11	16†	12	DNQ	9	12	Ret	**8**	5	**3**	11
12	(Portugal) Filipe Albuquerque	17	Ret	12	8	16	12	12	9	11	Ret	2	10	9
13	(Germany) Maro Engel	8	7	14	10	9	16	DNQ	15	10	7	15	14	5
14	(Germany) Christian Vietoris	13	15	15	9	11	11	4	13	13	5	12	Ret	4
15	(Denmark) Tom Kristensen				7									2
16	(United Kingdom) David Coulthard	10	16	9	13	8	6	5	17	12	10	DSQ	17†	1
17	(Netherlands) Renger van der Zande	18†	13	10	14	10	4	3	11	15	Ret	DSQ	12	0
18	(United Kingdom) Susie Stoddart (United Kingdom) Susie Wolff	12	12	13	DNS	13	DNQ	14	14	14	Ret	11	15	0
19	(Switzerland) Rahel Frey	15	17	17	15	17	15	DNQ	16	17†	12	14	16	0
Pos	Driver	HOC (Germany)	ZAN (Netherlands)	RBR (Austria)	LAU (Germany)	NOR (Germany)	OLY (Germany)		NÜR (Germany)	BRH (United Kingdom)	OSC (Germany)	VAL (Spain)	HOC (Germany)	Points

Colour	Result
Gold	Winner
Silver	Second place
Bronze	Third place
Green	Points classification
Blue	Non-points classification
Blue	Non-classified finish (NC)
Purple	Retired, not classified (Ret)
Red	Did not qualify (DNQ)
Red	Did not pre-qualify (DNPQ)
Black	Disqualified (DSQ)
White	Did not start (DNS)
White	Withdrew (WD)
White	Race cancelled (C)
Blank	Did not practice (DNP)
Blank	Did not arrive (DNA)
Blank	Excluded (EX)

**Bold** – Pole
Italics – Fastest Lap

- † — Driver retired, but was classified as they completed 90% of the winner's race distance.

=== Teams' Championship ===
Pos	Team	Car No.	HOC (Germany)	ZAN (Netherlands)	RBR (Austria)	LAU (Germany)	NOR (Germany)	OLY (Germany)		NÜR (Germany)	BRH (United Kingdom)	OSC (Germany)	VAL (Spain)	HOC (Germany)	Points
1	Audi Sport Team Abt Sportsline	8	2	8	Ret	11	7	7	6	**1**	2	1	**1**	6	85
1	Audi Sport Team Abt Sportsline	9	11	1	5	7	14	3	10	3	**6**	6	9	4	85
2	Thomas Sabo AMG Mercedes; Mercedes-Benz Bank AMG	2	6	9	8	4	Ret	10	11	8	4	4	8	5	76
2	Thomas Sabo AMG Mercedes; Mercedes-Benz Bank AMG	3	**1**	**2**	4	**3**	**1**	2	1	2	7	13	7	9	76
3	Audi Sport Team Phoenix	14	5	3	**1**	1	3	13	7	5	1	2	3	2	72
3	Audi Sport Team Phoenix	15	15	17	17	15	17	15	DNQ	16	17	12	14	16	72
4	Salzgitter AMG Mercedes; AMG Mercedes	6	3	11	2	12	6	5	16	Ret	5	Ret	13	11	56
4	Salzgitter AMG Mercedes; AMG Mercedes	7	7	4	6	6	2	9	8	6	8	11	10	1	56
5	Audi Sport Team Abt	4	4	5	7	2	4	14	13	4	16	Ret	4	7	50
5	Audi Sport Team Abt	5	9	10	3	5	15	8	15	10	9	9	6	8	50
6	Audi Sport Team Rosberg	18	17	Ret	12	8	16	12	12	9	11	Ret	2	10	30
6	Audi Sport Team Rosberg	19	14	6	16	Ret	5	1	2	7	3	3	16	13	30
7	Audi Sport Team Abt Junior	22	16	14	11	16	12	DNQ	9	12	Ret	**8**	5	**3**	11
8	GQ AMG Mercedes; Deutsche Post AMG Mercedes	16	8	7	14	10	9	16	DNQ	15	10	7	15	14	6
8	GQ AMG Mercedes; Deutsche Post AMG Mercedes	17	10	16	9	13	8	6	5	17	12	10	DSQ	17	6
9	TV Spielfilm AMG Mercedes; Junge Sterne AMG Mercedes	10	12	12	13	DNS	13	DNQ	14	14	14	Ret	11	15	4
9	TV Spielfilm AMG Mercedes; Junge Sterne AMG Mercedes	11	13	15	15	9	11	11	4	13	13	5	12	Ret	4
—	stern AMG Mercedes	20	18	13	10	14	10	4	3	11	15	Ret	DSQ	12	0
Pos	Team	Car No.	HOC (Germany)	ZAN (Netherlands)	RBR (Austria)	LAU (Germany)	NOR (Germany)	OLY (Germany)		NÜR (Germany)	BRH (United Kingdom)	OSC (Germany)	VAL (Spain)	HOC (Germany)	Points

Colour	Result
Gold	Winner
Silver	Second place
Bronze	Third place
Green	Points classification
Blue	Non-points classification
Blue	Non-classified finish (NC)
Purple	Retired, not classified (Ret)
Red	Did not qualify (DNQ)
Red	Did not pre-qualify (DNPQ)
Black	Disqualified (DSQ)
White	Did not start (DNS)
White	Withdrew (WD)
White	Race cancelled (C)
Blank	Did not practice (DNP)
Blank	Did not arrive (DNA)
Blank	Excluded (EX)

**Bold** – Pole
Italics – Fastest Lap

== Notable events ==
- The celebrations on the podium at final DTM race at Hockenheimring were muted due to the death of 2005, 2011 Indianapolis 500 and 2005 IndyCar Series champion Dan Wheldon who was killed in a fiery 15-car crash at Sunday's season-ending IndyCar race in Las Vegas. Jamie Green won the DTM season finale race as Green pays tribute to his compatriot a week after Las Vegas Indy tragedy.

== Bibliography ==
- Schröder, Torben (November 2011). DTM Jahrbuch 2011: Das offizielle Buch der DTM (in German). Saint Vith: Adrenalin Verlag. ISBN 978-3-940672-40-7.
- Wegner, Alexander von (November 2011). Tourenwagen Story 2011 (in German). Saint Vith: Adrenalin Verlag. ISBN 978-3-940672-39-1.
