= 2012 Deutsche Tourenwagen Masters =

Sports season

Champions
- Drivers' Champion: Bruno Spengler
- Teams' Champion: Schnitzer Motorsport
- Manufacturers' Championship: BMW

Seasons
- ← 2011 2013 →

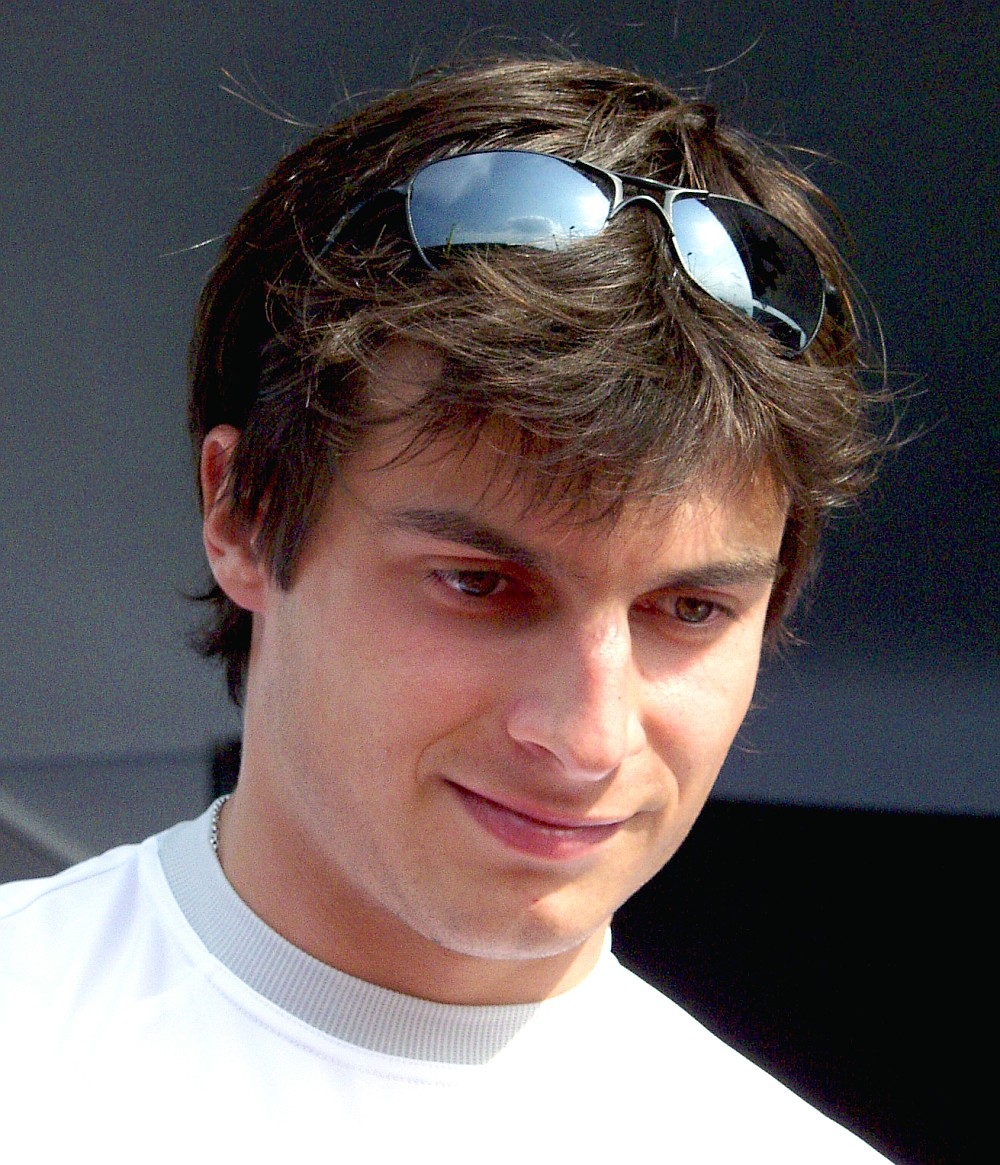
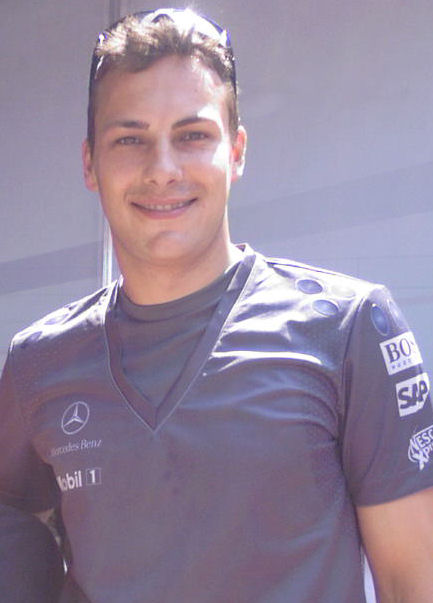
Bruno Spengler (left) won his first Deutsche Tourenwagen Masters Drivers' Championship while Gary Paffett (right) finished second in the championship.

The 2012 Deutsche Tourenwagen Masters was the twenty-sixth season of premier German touring car championship and also thirteenth season under the moniker of Deutsche Tourenwagen Masters (DTM) since the series' resumption in 2000. New regulations applied for the 2012 season (see below). BMW returned to the championship for the first time since 1994. It was also the last time non-European driver to won the DTM title until South African Sheldon van der Linde in 2022 season.

It was a return to form for BMW after returning from 18 years absence, and a weak year for Mercedes-Benz AMG, only attaining three official victories courtesy of Gary Paffett in Hockenheimring and Brands Hatch twice and Jamie Green in Norisring only, with an exception of Ralf Schumacher and Jamie Green in Showevent Olympiastadion München relay races respectively because of exhibition event.

== Rule changes ==
=== Sporting ===
- The points system for the 2012 season was changed to reflect the system used by the FIA for world championships. The top ten drivers in each race are awarded points on a scale of 25, 18, 15, 12, 10, 8, 6, 4, 2 and 1.
- Refuelling during the race was banned after 12 years due to safety concerns and also avoid cut costs.

=== Technical ===
- For the first time since 2003 and 2004 seasons the DTM reintroduced the smaller two-door coupé-style cars respectively but the two-door coupé-style cars shape were much different than 2000-2003 coupés as the new generational of Deutsche Tourenwagen Masters cars were based on 2-door coupé D-segment compact executive cars. The four-door D-segment mid-size sedan-style cars (introduced since 2004 but later as a mandatory requirement since 2005) was permanently retired after the 2011 season. However, the engine configuration format remained unchanged until 2018 despite the coupé-style cars' reintroduction.
- Due to the machinery format switch back to coupé-style machinery, the length of the cars without rear wing were shortened from 4,800 to 4,650 mm (189 to 183 in) but the overall length including rear wing were lengthened from 4,800 to 5,010 mm (189 to 197 in).
- After 12 years, the sequential manual gearbox shifters were replaced by newly-mandatory sequential semi-automatic paddle-shifters respectively for all DTM cars to help drivers making shifting easier and efficient rather than challenging manual stick shifters.
- The minimum weight of the cars has been increased from 1,050 kg (2,315 lb) to 1,100 kg (2,425 lb) due to the transition to 2-door coupé D-segment compact executive cars format including also the increase of fuel load weight. From 2000-2003, the all DTM cars weight were 1,080 kg (2,381 lb). From 2004-2006, all DTM cars weight were 1,030 kg (2,271 lb). From 2007-2011, the all DTM cars weight were 1,050 kg (2,315 lb).
- The rear wing of all DTM cars has been changed to the single-element plane wing instead of a dual-element plane wing to create downforce.
- The fuel tank capacity of all DTM cars were increased to 120 litres (32 US gallons) instead of usual 65–70 litres (17–18 US gallons) due to refuelling ban rules.
- The seat of all DTM cars was integrated into the carbon fibre monocoque that is connected to a roll cage of high-strength steel due to safety concerns.
- The year-old aging DTM cars were banned due to previous year cars were 4-door saloon model types.
- As a result of the transition from the outgoing four-door sedan-style cars to two-door coupé-style cars, the tyre sizes of Hankook Ventus DTM tyres were also altered from 260/660-R18 (10.2/25.9-R18) on fronts and 280/660-R18 (11.0/25.9-R18) on rears to 300/680-R18 (11.8/26.8-R18) on fronts and 320/700-R18 (12.6/27.9-R18) on rears in order to improve more mechanical grip and handling while cornering to suit the driving style.

== Calendar ==
An eleven-round calendar was announced on 11 November, including the non-championship event in Munich.

| Round | Circuit | Date | Maps |
|---|---|---|---|
| 1 | (Germany) Hockenheimring | 29 April | 2012 Deutsche Tourenwagen Masters is located in Germany 2012 Deutsche Tourenwagen Masters is located in England 2012 Deutsche Tourenwagen Masters is located in Austria 2012 Deutsche Tourenwagen Masters is located in Netherlands 2012 Deutsche Tourenwagen Masters is located in Spain |
| 2 | (Germany) Lausitzring | 6 May | 2012 Deutsche Tourenwagen Masters is located in Germany 2012 Deutsche Tourenwagen Masters is located in England 2012 Deutsche Tourenwagen Masters is located in Austria 2012 Deutsche Tourenwagen Masters is located in Netherlands 2012 Deutsche Tourenwagen Masters is located in Spain |
| 3 | (United Kingdom) Brands Hatch | 20 May | 2012 Deutsche Tourenwagen Masters is located in Germany 2012 Deutsche Tourenwagen Masters is located in England 2012 Deutsche Tourenwagen Masters is located in Austria 2012 Deutsche Tourenwagen Masters is located in Netherlands 2012 Deutsche Tourenwagen Masters is located in Spain |
| 4 | (Austria) Red Bull Ring | 3 June | 2012 Deutsche Tourenwagen Masters is located in Germany 2012 Deutsche Tourenwagen Masters is located in England 2012 Deutsche Tourenwagen Masters is located in Austria 2012 Deutsche Tourenwagen Masters is located in Netherlands 2012 Deutsche Tourenwagen Masters is located in Spain |
| 5 | (Germany) Norisring | 1 July | 2012 Deutsche Tourenwagen Masters is located in Germany 2012 Deutsche Tourenwagen Masters is located in England 2012 Deutsche Tourenwagen Masters is located in Austria 2012 Deutsche Tourenwagen Masters is located in Netherlands 2012 Deutsche Tourenwagen Masters is located in Spain |
| NC | (Germany) Olympiastadion München | 14–15 July | 2012 Deutsche Tourenwagen Masters is located in Germany 2012 Deutsche Tourenwagen Masters is located in England 2012 Deutsche Tourenwagen Masters is located in Austria 2012 Deutsche Tourenwagen Masters is located in Netherlands 2012 Deutsche Tourenwagen Masters is located in Spain |
| 6 | (Germany) Nürburgring | 19 August | 2012 Deutsche Tourenwagen Masters is located in Germany 2012 Deutsche Tourenwagen Masters is located in England 2012 Deutsche Tourenwagen Masters is located in Austria 2012 Deutsche Tourenwagen Masters is located in Netherlands 2012 Deutsche Tourenwagen Masters is located in Spain |
| 7 | (Netherlands) Circuit Park Zandvoort | 26 August | 2012 Deutsche Tourenwagen Masters is located in Germany 2012 Deutsche Tourenwagen Masters is located in England 2012 Deutsche Tourenwagen Masters is located in Austria 2012 Deutsche Tourenwagen Masters is located in Netherlands 2012 Deutsche Tourenwagen Masters is located in Spain |
| 8 | (Germany) Motorsport Arena Oschersleben | 16 September | 2012 Deutsche Tourenwagen Masters is located in Germany 2012 Deutsche Tourenwagen Masters is located in England 2012 Deutsche Tourenwagen Masters is located in Austria 2012 Deutsche Tourenwagen Masters is located in Netherlands 2012 Deutsche Tourenwagen Masters is located in Spain |
| 9 | (Spain) Circuit Ricardo Tormo | 30 September | 2012 Deutsche Tourenwagen Masters is located in Germany 2012 Deutsche Tourenwagen Masters is located in England 2012 Deutsche Tourenwagen Masters is located in Austria 2012 Deutsche Tourenwagen Masters is located in Netherlands 2012 Deutsche Tourenwagen Masters is located in Spain |
| 10 | (Germany) Hockenheimring | 21 October | 2012 Deutsche Tourenwagen Masters is located in Germany 2012 Deutsche Tourenwagen Masters is located in England 2012 Deutsche Tourenwagen Masters is located in Austria 2012 Deutsche Tourenwagen Masters is located in Netherlands 2012 Deutsche Tourenwagen Masters is located in Spain |

== Teams and drivers ==
The following manufacturers, teams and drivers competed in the 2012 Deutsche Tourenwagen Masters. All teams competed with tyres supplied by Hankook.

| Manufacturer | Car | Team | No. | Drivers | Rounds |
|---|---|---|---|---|---|
| BMW | BMW M3 DTM | (Germany) BMW Team RMG | 1 | (Germany) Martin Tomczyk | All |
| BMW | BMW M3 DTM | (Germany) BMW Team RMG | 2 | (United States) Joey Hand | All |
| BMW | BMW M3 DTM | (Germany) BMW Team Schnitzer | 7 | (Canada) Bruno Spengler | All |
| BMW | BMW M3 DTM | (Germany) BMW Team Schnitzer | 8 | (Germany) Dirk Werner | All |
| BMW | BMW M3 DTM | (Belgium) BMW Team RBM | 15 | (United Kingdom) Andy Priaulx | All |
| BMW | BMW M3 DTM | (Belgium) BMW Team RBM | 16 | (Brazil) Augusto Farfus | All |
| Audi | Audi A5 DTM | (Germany) Abt Sportsline | 3 | (Sweden) Mattias Ekström | All |
| Audi | Audi A5 DTM | (Germany) Abt Sportsline | 4 | (Germany) Timo Scheider | All |
| Audi | Audi A5 DTM | (Germany) Phoenix Racing | 9 | (Germany) Mike Rockenfeller | All |
| Audi | Audi A5 DTM | (Germany) Phoenix Racing | 10 | (Spain) Miguel Molina | All |
| Audi | Audi A5 DTM | (Germany) Audi Sport Team Abt | 17 | (Switzerland) Rahel Frey | All |
| Audi | Audi A5 DTM | (Germany) Audi Sport Team Abt | 18 | (France) Adrien Tambay | All |
| Audi | Audi A5 DTM | (Germany) Team Rosberg | 21 | (Italy) Edoardo Mortara | All |
| Audi | Audi A5 DTM | (Germany) Team Rosberg | 22 | (Portugal) Filipe Albuquerque | All |
| Mercedes-Benz | DTM AMG Mercedes C-Coupé | (Germany) Mercedes AMG | 5 | (United Kingdom) Jamie Green | All |
| Mercedes-Benz | DTM AMG Mercedes C-Coupé | (Germany) Mercedes AMG | 6 | (Germany) Ralf Schumacher | All |
| Mercedes-Benz | DTM AMG Mercedes C-Coupé | (Germany) HWA Team | 11 | (United Kingdom) Gary Paffett | All |
| Mercedes-Benz | DTM AMG Mercedes C-Coupé | (Germany) HWA Team | 12 | (Germany) Christian Vietoris | All |
| Mercedes-Benz | DTM AMG Mercedes C-Coupé | (Germany) Mücke Motorsport | 19 | (United Kingdom) David Coulthard | All |
| Mercedes-Benz | DTM AMG Mercedes C-Coupé | (Germany) Mücke Motorsport | 20 | (Canada) Robert Wickens | All |
| Mercedes-Benz | DTM AMG Mercedes C-Coupé | (Germany) Persson Motorsport | 23 | (Spain) Roberto Merhi | All |
| Mercedes-Benz | DTM AMG Mercedes C-Coupé | (Germany) Persson Motorsport | 24 | (United Kingdom) Susie Wolff | All |

=== Driver changes ===
==== Changed teams ====
- 2011 champion Martin Tomczyk left Team Phoenix and Audi to join Team RMG, one of the three teams running BMW machinery.
- 2011 runner-up Bruno Spengler left Mercedes' HWA Team and also joined BMW with Team Schnitzer.
- Rahel Frey left Team Phoenix to join Abt Sportsline, with Mike Rockenfeller and Miguel Molina moving over from Abt to fill the seats at Team Phoenix.
- Christian Vietoris switched from Persson Motorsport to HWA Team.

==== Entering DTM ====
- Long-time BMW factory drivers Augusto Farfus, Joey Hand, Andy Priaulx and Dirk Werner made their début in the series with BMW. Farfus and Priaulx are driving for Team RBM, Hand for Team RMG and Werner with Team Schnitzer.
- Formula 3 Euro Series champion Roberto Merhi and Formula Renault 3.5 Series champion Robert Wickens joined Mercedes teams Persson Motorsport and Mücke Motorsport respectively.
- After competing in Auto GP, French driver Adrien Tambay joined Abt Sportsline for his debut in the series.

==== Leaving DTM ====
- Maro Engel left the series.
- Oliver Jarvis was promoted to the Audi LMP1 sportscar squad and the FIA GT1 World Championship with Team WRT, and was replaced by Adrien Tambay.
- Renger van der Zande left the DTM series.

== Results and standings ==
=== Results summary ===
| Round | Circuit | Date | Pole position | Fastest lap | Winning driver | Winning team | Winning manufacturer |
|---|---|---|---|---|---|---|---|
| 1 | (Germany) Hockenheimring | 29 April | (Sweden) Mattias Ekström | (United Kingdom) Jamie Green | (United Kingdom) Gary Paffett | HWA Team | Mercedes-Benz |
| 2 | (Germany) Lausitzring | 6 May | (Canada) Bruno Spengler | (United Kingdom) Jamie Green | (Canada) Bruno Spengler | BMW Team Schnitzer | BMW |
| 3 | (United Kingdom) Brands Hatch, Kent | 20 May | (United Kingdom) Gary Paffett | (Germany) Martin Tomczyk | (United Kingdom) Gary Paffett | HWA Team | Mercedes-Benz |
| 4 | (Austria) Red Bull Ring, Spielberg | 3 June | (Italy) Edoardo Mortara | (Germany) Timo Scheider | (Italy) Edoardo Mortara | Team Rosberg | Audi |
| 5 | (Germany) Norisring, Nuremberg | 1 July | (United Kingdom) Gary Paffett | (United Kingdom) Jamie Green | (United Kingdom) Jamie Green | Mercedes AMG | Mercedes-Benz |
| NC | (Germany) Showevent Olympiastadion München | 14 July | Relay races | | (United Kingdom) Jamie Green (Germany) Ralf Schumacher | Mercedes AMG | Mercedes-Benz |
| NC | (Germany) Showevent Olympiastadion München | 15 July | Knockout races | | (Sweden) Mattias Ekström | Abt Sportsline | Audi |
| 6 | (Germany) Nürburgring | 19 August | (Canada) Bruno Spengler | (Canada) Bruno Spengler | (Canada) Bruno Spengler | BMW Team Schnitzer | BMW |
| 7 | (Netherlands) Circuit Park Zandvoort | 26 August | (Germany) Timo Scheider | (United Kingdom) Gary Paffett | (Italy) Edoardo Mortara | Team Rosberg | Audi |
| 8 | (Germany) Motorsport Arena Oschersleben | 16 September | (Canada) Bruno Spengler | (Spain) Roberto Merhi | (Canada) Bruno Spengler | BMW Team Schnitzer | BMW |
| 9 | (Spain) Circuit Ricardo Tormo, Valencia | 30 September | (Brazil) Augusto Farfus | (Canada) Bruno Spengler | (Brazil) Augusto Farfus | BMW Team RBM | BMW |
| 10 | (Germany) Hockenheimring | 21 October | (Brazil) Augusto Farfus | (United Kingdom) Gary Paffett | (Canada) Bruno Spengler | BMW Team Schnitzer | BMW |

=== Championship standings ===
Scoring system

Points are awarded to the top ten classified finishers as follows:

| Position | **1st** | **2nd** | **3rd** | **4th** | **5th** | **6th** | **7th** | **8th** | **9th** | **10th** |
| Points | 25 | 18 | 15 | 12 | 10 | 8 | 6 | 4 | 2 | 1 |

=== Drivers' championship ===
| Pos. | Driver | HOC (Germany) | LAU (Germany) | BRH (United Kingdom) | RBR (Austria) | NOR (Germany) | OLY^{‡} (Germany) | | NÜR (Germany) | ZAN (Netherlands) | OSC (Germany) | VAL (Spain) | HOC (Germany) | Points |
|---|---|---|---|---|---|---|---|---|---|---|---|---|---|---|
| 1 | (Canada) Bruno Spengler | Ret | **1** | 2 | Ret | 3 | 5 | 3 | **1** | 6 | **1** | 6 | 1 | 149 |
| 2 | (United Kingdom) Gary Paffett | 1 | 2 | **1** | 3 | **4** | 3 | 3 | 6 | 7 | 2 | Ret | 2 | 145 |
| 3 | (United Kingdom) Jamie Green | 2 | 4 | 8 | 5 | 1 | 1 | 2 | 4 | 4 | 3 | 10 | 4 | 121 |
| 4 | (Germany) Mike Rockenfeller | 5 | 13 | 3 | 7 | 6 | DNQ | 5 | 5 | 2 | 6 | 5 | Ret | 85 |
| 5 | (Italy) Edoardo Mortara | 11 | 8 | 9 | **1** | Ret | DNQ | 9 | 2 | 1 | Ret | 16† | 6 | 82 |
| 6 | (Sweden) Mattias Ekström | **3** | 5 | 5 | 4 | Ret | 5 | 1 | 11 | 3 | 8 | 3 | Ret | 81 |
| 7 | (Brazil) Augusto Farfus | 15 | 3 | 11 | 10 | Ret | 5 | 5 | 10 | 9 | 5 | **1** | **3** | 69 |
| 8 | (Germany) Martin Tomczyk | Ret | 7 | 4 | 2 | 2 | DNQ | 5 | 3 | Ret | Ret | Ret | 14 | 69 |
| 9 | (Germany) Dirk Werner | 17 | 19 | 16 | Ret | 10 | 4 | 17 | 12 | 8 | 4 | 9 | 5 | 29 |
| 10 | (France) Adrien Tambay | Ret | 18 | 12 | Ret | 15 | 2 | 9 | Ret | 5 | 16 | 2 | Ret | 28 |
| 11 | (Portugal) Filipe Albuquerque | 10 | 9 | 10 | 8 | 11 | DNQ | 9 | 8 | 15† | 9 | 4 | 11 | 26 |
| 12 | (Germany) Christian Vietoris | 4 | 11 | 6 | Ret | 8 | 3 | 9 | 16 | Ret | 12 | 12 | 10 | 25 |
| 13 | (United Kingdom) Andy Priaulx | 6 | 17 | Ret | Ret | 7 | DNQ | 17 | 19 | 13 | Ret | 8 | 7 | 24 |
| 14 | (Germany) Timo Scheider | Ret | 6 | Ret | 6 | 16 | 2 | 17 | 9 | **Ret** | 10 | Ret | 12 | 19 |
| 15 | (United Kingdom) David Coulthard | 8 | 12 | 15 | Ret | 5 | DNQ | 5 | 20 | Ret | Ret | 11 | Ret | 14 |
| 16 | (Canada) Robert Wickens | 14 | 22† | 14 | 13 | 9 | DNQ | 9 | 7 | Ret | 7 | Ret | Ret | 14 |
| 17 | (Germany) Ralf Schumacher | 7 | 10 | 19 | 11 | Ret | 1 | 17 | 13 | 10 | 13 | 14 | 9 | 10 |
| 18 | (Spain) Miguel Molina | 9 | 15 | 7 | Ret | 12 | 5 | 9 | 15 | Ret | 15 | Ret | Ret | 8 |
| 19 | (Switzerland) Rahel Frey | 16 | 20 | 18 | 15 | 17 | DNQ | 9 | 14 | Ret | Ret | 7 | 16 | 6 |
| 20 | (United States) Joey Hand | 13 | 14 | 13 | 9 | 14 | 4 | 9 | 18 | 14 | 11 | 15† | 8 | 6 |
| 21 | (Spain) Roberto Merhi | 18 | 16 | 17 | 12 | 13 | DNQ | 17 | Ret | 11 | 14 | Ret | 15 | 0 |
| 22 | (United Kingdom) Susie Wolff | 12 | 21 | 20† | 14 | Ret | DNQ | 17 | 17 | 12 | Ret | 13 | 13 | 0 |
| Pos. | Driver | HOC (Germany) | LAU (Germany) | BRH (United Kingdom) | RBR (Austria) | NOR (Germany) | OLY^{‡} (Germany) | | NÜR (Germany) | ZAN (Netherlands) | OSC (Germany) | VAL (Spain) | HOC (Germany) | Points |

| Colour | Result |
|---|---|
| Gold | Winner |
| Silver | Second place |
| Bronze | Third place |
| Green | Points classification |
| Blue | Non-points classification |
| Blue | Non-classified finish (NC) |
| Purple | Retired, not classified (Ret) |
| Red | Did not qualify (DNQ) |
| Red | Did not pre-qualify (DNPQ) |
| Black | Disqualified (DSQ) |
| White | Did not start (DNS) |
| White | Withdrew (WD) |
| White | Race cancelled (C) |
| Blank | Did not practice (DNP) |
| Blank | Did not arrive (DNA) |
| Blank | Excluded (EX) |

**Bold** – Pole
Italics – Fastest Lap

Notes:

- † — Driver retired, but was classified as they completed 90% of the winner's race distance.
- ‡ — No points are awarded for the non-championship Munich Olympiastadion event.

=== Teams' championship ===
| Pos. | Team | No. | HOC (Germany) | LAU (Germany) | BRH (United Kingdom) | RBR (Austria) | NOR (Germany) | OLY^{‡} (Germany) | | NÜR (Germany) | ZAN (Netherlands) | OSC (Germany) | VAL (Spain) | HOC (Germany) | Points |
|---|---|---|---|---|---|---|---|---|---|---|---|---|---|---|---|
| 1 | BMW Team Schnitzer | 7 | Ret | **1** | 2 | Ret | 3 | 5 | 3 | **1** | 6 | **1** | 6 | 1 | 178 |
| 1 | BMW Team Schnitzer | 8 | 17 | 19 | 16 | Ret | 10 | 4 | 17 | 12 | 8 | 4 | 9 | 5 | 178 |
| 2 | HWA Team | 11 | 1 | 2 | **1** | 3 | **4** | 3 | 3 | 6 | 7 | 2 | Ret | 2 | 170 |
| 2 | HWA Team | 12 | 4 | 11 | 6 | Ret | 8 | 3 | 9 | 16 | Ret | 12 | 12 | 10 | 170 |
| 3 | Mercedes AMG | 5 | 2 | 4 | 8 | 5 | 1 | 1 | 2 | 4 | 4 | 3 | 10 | 4 | 131 |
| 3 | Mercedes AMG | 6 | 7 | 10 | 19 | 11 | Ret | 1 | 17 | 13 | 10 | 13 | 14 | 9 | 131 |
| 4 | Team Rosberg | 21 | 11 | 8 | 9 | **1** | Ret | DNQ | 9 | 2 | 1 | Ret | 16† | 6 | 108 |
| 4 | Team Rosberg | 22 | 10 | 9 | 10 | 8 | 11 | DNQ | 9 | 8 | 15† | 9 | 4 | 11 | 108 |
| 5 | Abt Sportsline | 3 | **3** | 5 | 5 | 4 | Ret | 5 | 1 | 11 | 3 | 8 | 3 | Ret | 100 |
| 5 | Abt Sportsline | 4 | Ret | 6 | Ret | 6 | 16 | 2 | 17 | 9 | **Ret** | 10 | Ret | Ret | 100 |
| 6 | BMW Team RBM | 15 | 6 | 17 | Ret | Ret | 7 | DNQ | 17 | 19 | 13 | Ret | 8 | 7 | 93 |
| 6 | BMW Team RBM | 16 | 15 | 3 | 11 | 10 | Ret | 5 | 5 | 10 | 9 | 5 | **1** | **3** | 93 |
| 7 | Phoenix Racing | 9 | 5 | 13 | 3 | 7 | 6 | DNQ | 5 | 5 | 2 | 6 | 5 | Ret | 93 |
| 7 | Phoenix Racing | 10 | 9 | 15 | 7 | Ret | 12 | 5 | 9 | 15 | Ret | 15 | Ret | Ret | 93 |
| 8 | BMW Team RMG | 1 | Ret | 7 | 4 | 2 | 2 | DNQ | 5 | 3 | Ret | Ret | Ret | 14 | 75 |
| 8 | BMW Team RMG | 2 | 13 | 14 | 13 | 9 | 14 | 4 | 9 | 18 | 14 | 11 | 15† | 8 | 75 |
| 9 | Audi Sport Team Abt | 17 | 16 | 20 | 18 | 15 | 17 | DNQ | 9 | 14 | Ret | Ret | 7 | 16 | 34 |
| 9 | Audi Sport Team Abt | 18 | Ret | 18 | 12 | Ret | 15 | 2 | 9 | Ret | 5 | 16 | 2 | Ret | 34 |
| 10 | Mücke Motorsport | 19 | 8 | 12 | 15 | Ret | 5 | DNQ | 5 | 20 | Ret | Ret | 11 | Ret | 28 |
| 10 | Mücke Motorsport | 20 | 14 | 22† | 14 | 13 | 9 | DNQ | 9 | 7 | Ret | 7 | Ret | Ret | 28 |
| 11 | Persson Motorsport | 23 | 18 | 16 | 17 | 12 | 13 | DNQ | 17 | Ret | 11 | 14 | Ret | 15 | 0 |
| 11 | Persson Motorsport | 24 | 12 | 21 | 20† | 14 | Ret | DNQ | 17 | 17 | 12 | Ret | 13 | 13 | 0 |
| Pos. | Team | No. | HOC (Germany) | LAU (Germany) | BRH (United Kingdom) | RBR (Austria) | NOR (Germany) | OLY^{‡} (Germany) | | NÜR (Germany) | ZAN (Netherlands) | OSC (Germany) | VAL (Spain) | HOC (Germany) | Points |

| Colour | Result |
|---|---|
| Gold | Winner |
| Silver | Second place |
| Bronze | Third place |
| Green | Points classification |
| Blue | Non-points classification |
| Blue | Non-classified finish (NC) |
| Purple | Retired, not classified (Ret) |
| Red | Did not qualify (DNQ) |
| Red | Did not pre-qualify (DNPQ) |
| Black | Disqualified (DSQ) |
| White | Did not start (DNS) |
| White | Withdrew (WD) |
| White | Race cancelled (C) |
| Blank | Did not practice (DNP) |
| Blank | Did not arrive (DNA) |
| Blank | Excluded (EX) |

**Bold** – Pole
Italics – Fastest Lap

Notes:

- † — Driver retired, but was classified as they completed 90% of the winner's race distance.
- ‡ — No points are awarded for the non-championship Munich Olympiastadion event.

=== Manufacturers' championship ===
| Pos. | Manufacturer | HOC (Germany) | LAU (Germany) | BRH (United Kingdom) | RBR (Austria) | NOR (Germany) | OLY^{‡} (Germany) | | NÜR (Germany) | ZAN (Netherlands) | OSC (Germany) | VAL (Spain) | HOC (Germany) | Points |
|---|---|---|---|---|---|---|---|---|---|---|---|---|---|---|
| 1 | BMW | 8 | 46 | 30 | 21 | 40 | 0 | 0 | 41 | 14 | 47 | 39 | 60 | 346 |
| 2 | Audi | 28 | 24 | 34 | 55 | 8 | 0 | 0 | 34 | 68 | 15 | 61 | 8 | 335 |
| 3 | Mercedes-Benz | 65 | 31 | 37 | 25 | 53 | 0 | 0 | 26 | 19 | 39 | 1 | 33 | 329 |
| Pos. | Manufacturer | HOC (Germany) | LAU (Germany) | BRH (United Kingdom) | RBR (Austria) | NOR (Germany) | OLY^{‡} (Germany) | | NÜR (Germany) | ZAN (Netherlands) | OSC (Germany) | VAL (Spain) | HOC (Germany) | Points |

Notes:

- ‡ — No points are awarded for the non-championship Munich Olympiastadion event.

== Bibliography ==
- Schröder, Torben (November 2012). DTM – das offizielle Jahrbuch 2012 (in German). Saint Vith: Adrenalin Verlag. ISBN 978-3-943861-03-7.
- Voigt, Thomas; Paulun, Volker (November 2012). Tourenwagen Story 2012: Alle Serien, Alle Rennen, Alle Sieger (in German). Saint Vith: Adrenalin Verlag. ISBN 978-3-943861-04-4.
