= Rahel Frey =

Swiss Audi factory racing driver (born 1986)

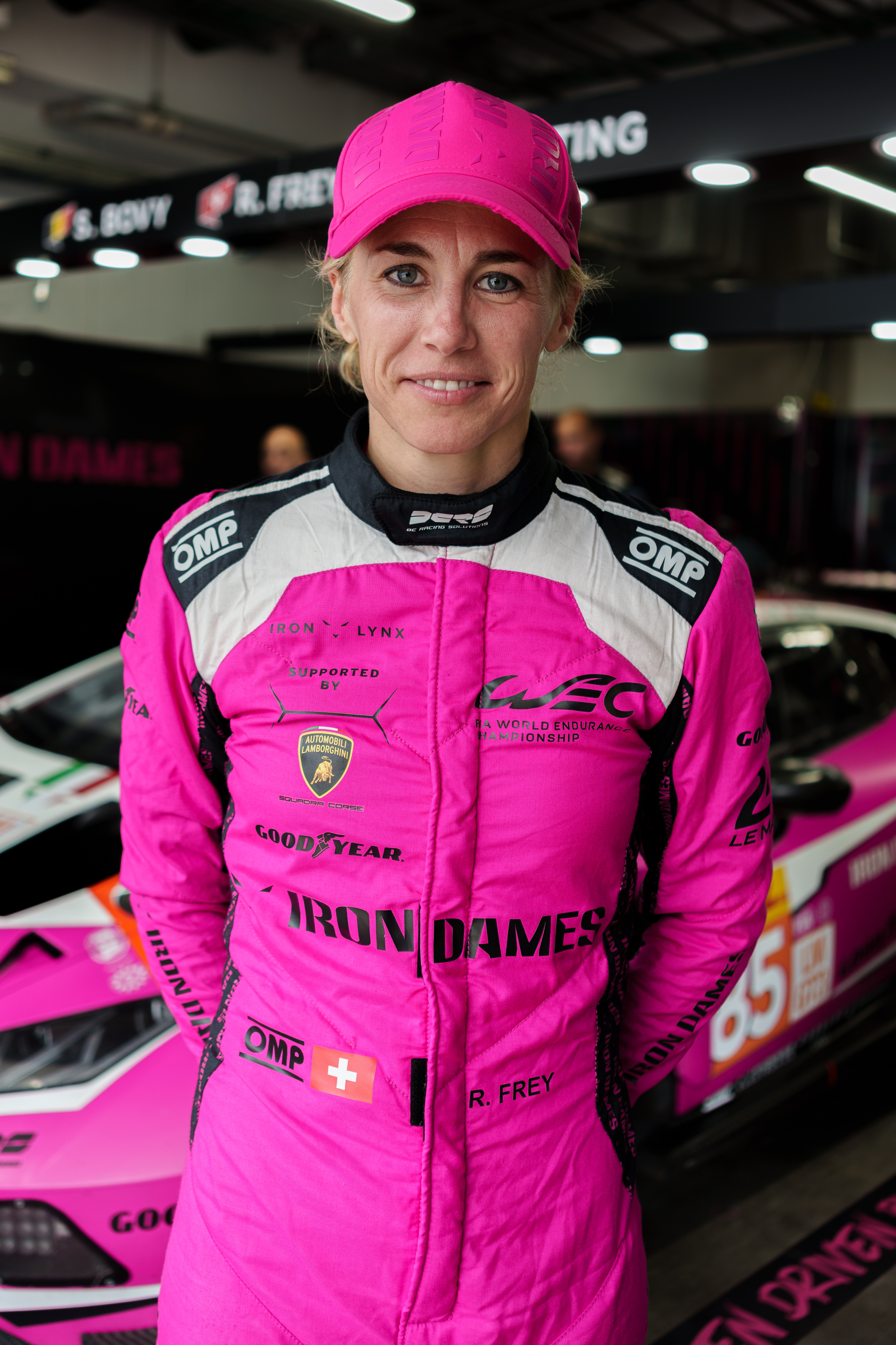
- Frey at the 2024 6 Hours of Fuji
- Nationality: (Switzerland) Swiss
- Born: 23 February 1986 (age 40) Niederbipp, Switzerland
- Categorisation: FIA Silver (until 2021, 2024–); FIA Gold (2022–2023)

Previous series
- 2008–09 2007 2006 2006 2005 2004–05: ATS Formel 3 Cup; International Formula Master; Eurocup Formula Renault 2.0; Formula Renault 2.0 Italy; Formula Renault 2.0 Germany; Formula Renault Switzerland

Rahel Frey (born 23 February 1986 in Niederbipp, Canton of Bern) is a Swiss racing driver and manager. She currently serves as a sporting director at Team WRT, in charge of their GT racing programmes.

Frey began her career in junior formulae before graduating to sports car racing in 2010. She later became an Audi factory driver and competed in numerous series for the German marque, including two seasons in the Deutsche Tourenwagen Masters and a top five at the 2014 Bathurst 12 Hour. Frey has participated in the 24 Hours of Le Mans eight times and is the second most experienced female driver in the event. She is part of the first all-female crew to win an FIA World Endurance Championship race in class, winning the 2023 8 Hours of Bahrain in GTE Am for Iron Dames alongside Sarah Bovy and Michelle Gatting.

== Racing record ==
=== Career summary ===
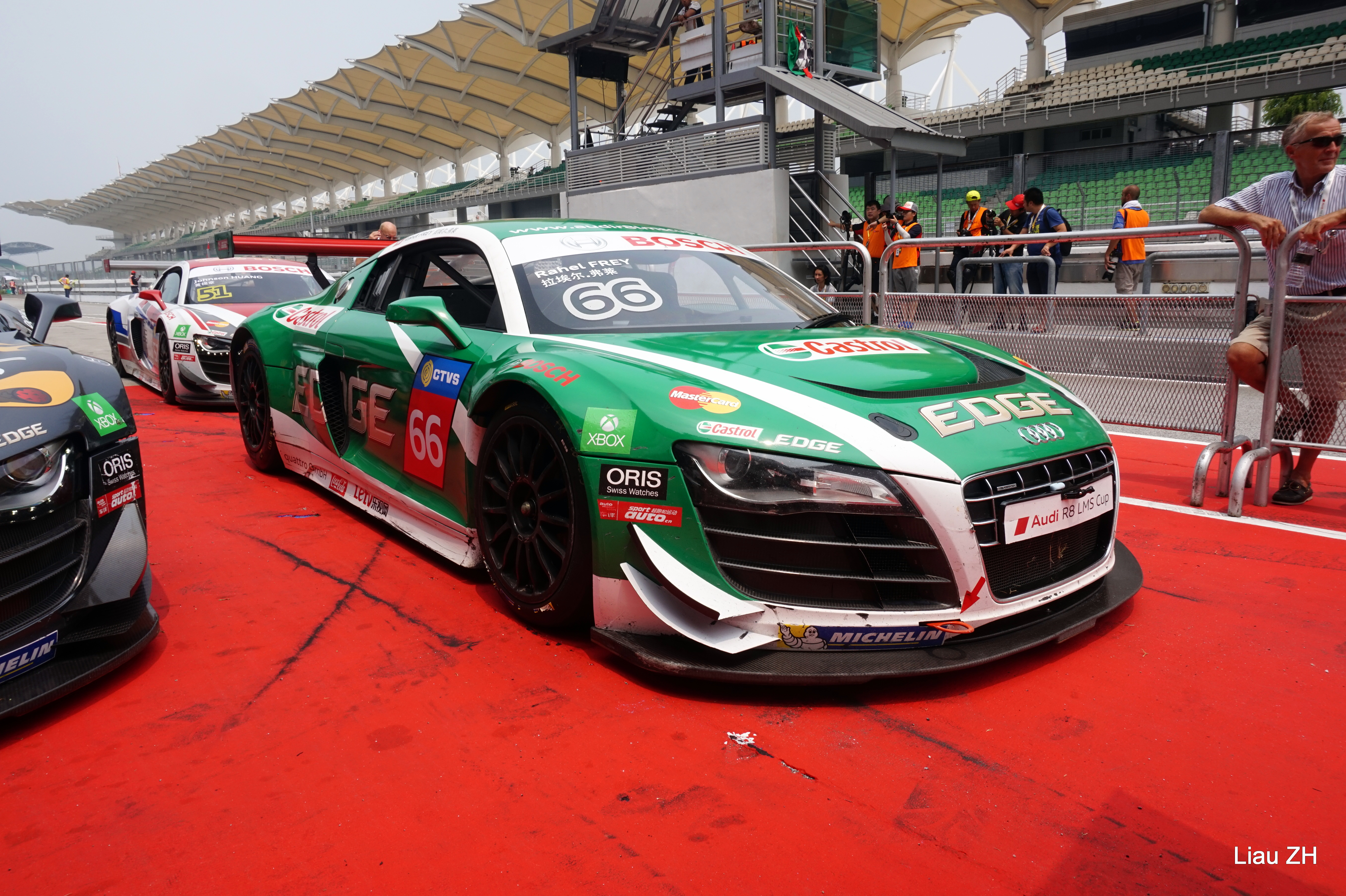
Frey's Audi R8 LMS in the pitlane at Sepang for the 2015 Audi R8 LMS Cup.

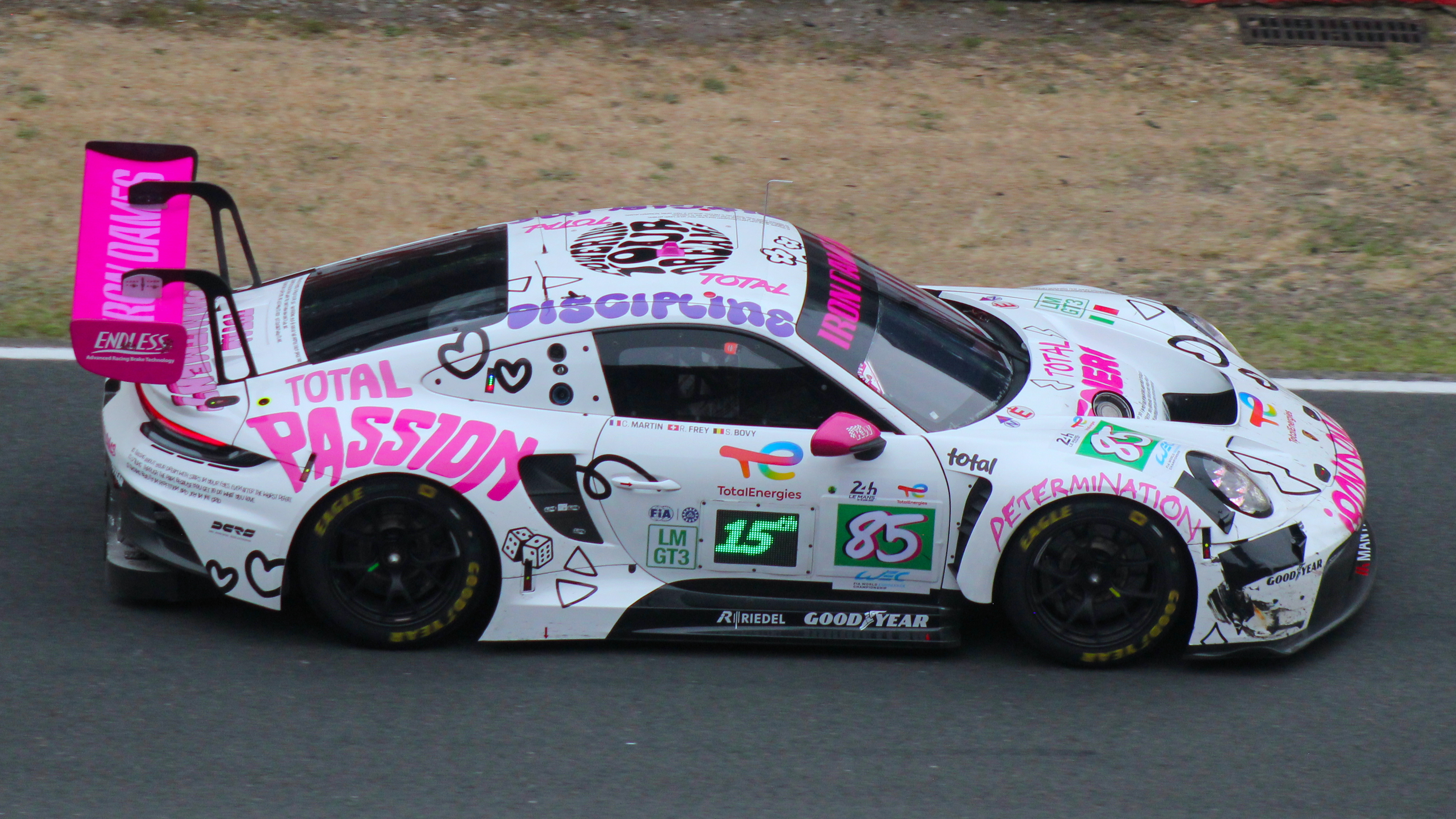
Frey's No. 85 Porsche 911 GT3 R at the 2025 24 Hours of Le Mans.

Season	Series	Team	Races	Wins	Poles	F/Laps	Podiums	Points	Position
2004	Renault Speed Trophy F2000	Iris Racing	10	1	0	0	2	151	4th
2005	Formula Renault 2.0 Suisse	N/A	9	2	0	7	6	153	**3rd**
2005	Formula Renault 2.0 Germany	Equipe Bernoise	4	0	1	0	0	27	23rd
2006	Eurocup Formula Renault 2.0	Jenzer Motorsport	14	0	0	0	0	8	21st
2006	Formula Renault 2.0 Italia	Jenzer Motorsport	13	0	0	0	0	24	18th
2007	International Formula Master	Jenzer Motorsport	16	0	0	0	0	9	17th
2008	ATS Formel 3 Cup	Van Amersfoort Racing	16	0	0	1	0	5	14th
2009	ATS Formel 3 Cup	Jo Zeller Racing	10	1	1	1	4	45	7th
2010	Volkswagen Scirocco R-Cup	N/A	2	0	0	1	0	0	NC†
2010	Le Mans Series - GT1	Matech Competition	1	0	0	0	1	13	7th
2010	24 Hours of Le Mans - GT1	Matech Competition	1	0	0	0	0	N/A	DNF
2010	FIA GT1 World Championship	Matech Competition	2	0	0	0	0	0	59th
2011	Deutsche Tourenwagen Masters	Team Phoenix	10	0	0	0	0	0	19th
2012	Deutsche Tourenwagen Masters	Audi Sport Team Abt	10	0	0	0	0	6	19th
2013	ADAC GT Masters	Prosperia C. Abt Racing	15	0	0	0	0	27	19th
2013	Audi R8 LMS Cup China	Castrol Racing Team	7	1	0	0	1	101	4th
2013	Blancpain Endurance Series - Pro Cup	Belgian Audi Club WRT	5	0	0	0	0	4	31st
2013	Nürburgring Endurance Series - SP9	Audi Race Experience	1	0	?	?	0	?	?
2013	24 Hours of Nürburgring - SP9	Audi Race Experience	1	0	0	0	0	N/A	14th
2014	ADAC GT Masters	Yaco Racing	14	0	0	0	0	4	39th
2014	Audi R8 LMS Cup China	Castrol Racing Team	12	0	0	1	5	148	**3rd**
2014	Blancpain Endurance Series - Pro Cup	Audi Race Experience	1	0	0	0	0	0	NC
2014	Nürburgring Endurance Series - SP9	Audi Race Experience	1	0	0	0	0	?	?
2014	24 Hours of Nürburgring - SP9	Audi Race Experience	1	0	0	0	0	N/A	12th
2014	Bathurst 12 Hour	Phoenix Racing	1	0	0	0	0	N/A	5th
2015	ADAC GT Masters	Yaco Racing	16	1	0	1	3	92	10th
2015	Audi R8 LMS Cup China	Castrol Racing Team	10	1	2	1	6	110	5th
2015	Audi Sport TT Cup	N/A	2	0	0	0	0	0	NC†
2016	ADAC GT Masters	Yaco Racing	12	1	0	0	2	55	9th
2016	Audi R8 LMS Cup China	Castrol Racing Team	12	2	0	2	7	157	4th
2017	ADAC GT Masters	Yaco Racing	14	0	0	0	0	3	36th
2017	24H Series - A6	Car Collection Motorsport	3	0	0	0	0	36	25th
2017	Nürburgring Endurance Series - SPX	Car Collection Motorsport	1	1	0	0	1	?	?
2017	24 Hours of Nürburgring - SP-X	Audi Sport Team Phoenix	1	0	0	0	1	N/A	**3rd**
2017	Audi Sport TT Cup - Race of Legends	N/A	1	0	0	1	0	N/A	DNF
2018	ADAC GT Masters	Yaco Racing	14	0	0	0	0	0	NC
2018	Audi Sport Seyffarth R8 LMS Cup	N/A	4	0	0	1	4	55	10th
2018	VLN Endurance	RaceIng - powered by HFG	3	0	0	0	0	12.86	413th
2018	GT Asia - GT3	B-Quik Racing Team	2	0	0	0	0	0	NC
2018	24 Hours of Nürburgring - Cup-X	True Racing	1	0	0	0	1	N/A	**2nd**
2018	Gulf 12 Hours - GT3 Pro-Am	Kessel Racing	2	0	0	0	2	N/A	**2nd**
2019	European Le Mans Series - LMGTE	Kessel Racing	6	0	0	0	2	68	4th
2019	24 Hours of Le Mans - LMGTE Am	Kessel Racing	1	0	0	0	0	N/A	9th
2019	Blancpain GT World Challenge Asia - GT3	Audi Sport Asia Team TSRT	6	0	0	0	0	56	13th
2019	Audi Sport Seyffarth R8 LMS Cup	N/A	8	6	2	4	8	164	6th
2019	VLN Series - SP8	Giti Tire Motorsport by RaceIng	3	0	0	0	1	7.5	19th
2019	24 Hours of Nürburgring - SP8	Giti Tire Motorsport by RaceIng	1	1	0	0	1	N/A	**1st**
2020	European Le Mans Series - GTE	Iron Lynx	5	0	0	1	3	61	5th
2020	24 Hours of Le Mans - LMGTE Am	Iron Lynx	1	0	0	0	0	N/A	9th
2020	ADAC GT Masters	Aust Motorsport	10	0	0	0	0	0	NC
2020	IMSA SportsCar Championship - GTD	GEAR Racing powered by GRT Grasser	1	0	0	0	0	15	57th
2020	Nürburgring Endurance Series - SP9 Am	RaceIng - powered by HFG	2	0	0	0	1	8	18th
2020	24 Hours of Nürburgring - SP9	RaceIng - powered by HFG / Racing Engineers GmbH	1	0	0	0	0	N/A	DNF
2020	24H GT Continents Series - GT4	Heide-Motorsport	1	0	0	0	0	16	10th
2021	FIA World Endurance Championship - LMGTE Am	Iron Lynx	6	0	0	0	0	46	10th
2021	European Le Mans Series - LMGTE	Iron Lynx	6	0	0	0	2	50	9th
2021	24 Hours of Le Mans - LMGTE Am	Iron Lynx	1	0	0	0	0	N/A	9th
2022	FIA World Endurance Championship - LMGTE Am	Iron Dames	6	0	2	0	3	93	4th
2022	GT World Challenge Europe Endurance Cup	Iron Dames	5	0	0	0	0	0	NC
2022	Intercontinental GT Challenge	Iron Dames	1	0	0	0	0	0	*
2022	24 Hours of Le Mans - LMGTE Am	Iron Dames	1	0	0	0	0	N/A	7th
2022	European Le Mans Series - LMGTE	Iron Lynx	3	0	0	0	0	26	18th
2023	FIA World Endurance Championship - LMGTE Am	Iron Dames	7	1	3	0	2	118	**2nd**
2023	IMSA SportsCar Championship - GTD	Iron Dames	4	0	0	0	0	770	35th
2023	GT World Challenge Europe Endurance Cup	Iron Dames	5	0	0	0	0	0	NC
2023	GT World Challenge Europe Endurance Cup - Bronze Cup	Iron Dames	5	0	1	0	0	10	24th
2023	24 Hours of Le Mans - LMGTE Am	Iron Dames	1	0	0	0	0	N/A	4th
2024	IMSA SportsCar Championship - GTD	Iron Dames	5	0	0	0	0	918	39th
2024	European Le Mans Series - LMGT3	Iron Dames	6	1	4	0	2	65	4th
2024	FIA World Endurance Championship - LMGT3	Iron Dames	6	0	2	0	0	48	12th
2025	FIA World Endurance Championship - LMGT3	Iron Dames	8	0	0	0	0	19	18th
2025	IMSA SportsCar Championship - GTD	Iron Dames	2	0	0	0	0	471	46th

^{†} As Frey was a guest driver, she was ineligible for points.

=== Complete Eurocup Formula Renault 2.0 results ===
(key) (Races in bold indicate pole position) (Races in italics indicate fastest lap)

Year	Team	1	2	3	4	5	6	7	8	9	10	11	12	13	14	Pos	Points	Ref
2006	Jenzer Motorsport	ZOL; 1; 13	ZOL; 2; 14	IST; 1; 27†	IST; 2; 12	MIS; 1 Ret	MIS; 2; 17	NÜR; 1 Ret	NÜR; 2; 26	DON; 1; 8	DON; 2; 14	LMS; 1; 18	LMS; 2 Ret	CAT; 1; 6	CAT; 2 DSQ	21st	8	

=== Complete 24 Hours of Le Mans results ===
Year	Team	Co-Drivers	Car	Class	Laps	Pos.	Class Pos.
2010	(Switzerland) Matech Competition	(Switzerland) Natacha Gachnang (Switzerland) Cyndie Allemann	Ford GT1	GT1	59	DNF	DNF
2019	(Switzerland) Kessel Racing	(Denmark) Michelle Gatting (Italy) Manuela Gostner	Ferrari 488 GTE	GTE; Am	330	39th	9th
2020	(Italy) Iron Lynx	(Denmark) Michelle Gatting (Italy) Manuela Gostner	Ferrari 488 GTE Evo	GTE; Am	332	34th	9th
2021	(Italy) Iron Lynx	(Denmark) Michelle Gatting (Belgium) Sarah Bovy	Ferrari 488 GTE Evo	GTE; Am	332	36th	9th
2022	(Italy) Iron Dames	(Denmark) Michelle Gatting (Belgium) Sarah Bovy	Ferrari 488 GTE Evo	GTE; Am	339	40th	7th
2023	(Italy) Iron Dames	(Belgium) Sarah Bovy (Denmark) Michelle Gatting	Porsche 911 RSR-19	GTE; Am	312	30th	4th
2024	(Italy) Iron Dames	(Belgium) Sarah Bovy (Denmark) Michelle Gatting	Lamborghini Huracán GT3 Evo 2	LMGT3	279	32nd	5th
2025	(Italy) Iron Dames	(Belgium) Sarah Bovy (France) Célia Martin	Porsche 911 GT3 R (992)	LMGT3	334	48th	16th

=== Complete Deutsche Tourenwagen Masters results ===
(key) (Races in bold indicate pole position) (Races in italics indicate fastest lap)

Year	Team	Car	1	2	3	4	5	6	7	8	9	10	Pos.	Pts
2011	Team Phoenix	Audi A4 DTM 2008	HOC; 15	ZAN; 17	SPL; 17	LAU; 15	NOR; 17	NÜR; 16	BRH; 17	OSC; 12	VAL; 14	HOC; 16	19th	0
2012	Audi Sport Team Abt	Audi A5 DTM	HOC; 16	LAU; 20	BRH; 18	SPL; 15	NOR; 17	NÜR; 14	ZAN; Ret	OSC; Ret	VAL; 7	HOC; 16	19th	6

=== Complete ADAC GT Masters Results ===
(key) (Races in bold indicate pole position) (Races in italics indicate fastest lap)

Year	Team	Car	1	2	3	4	5	6	7	8	9	10	11	12	13	14	15	16	Pos.	Points
2013	Prosperia C. Abt Racing	Audi R8 LMS Ultra	OSC; 1; 9	OSC; 2 Ret	SPA; 1; 6	SPA; 2; 17	SAC; 1; 14	SAC; 2; 12	NÜR; 1; 12	NÜR; 2 Ret	RBR; 1; 12	RBR; 2; 10	LAU; 1; 8	LAU; 2; 18	SVK; 1; 8	SVK; 2; 6	HOC; 1 Ret	HOC; 2 DNS	19th	27
2014	Yaco Racing	Audi R8 LMS Ultra	OSC; 1; 9	OSC; 2; 9	ZAN; 1; 13	ZAN; 2 Ret	LAU; 1; 14	LAU; 2; 18	RBR; 1; 24	RBR; 2; 18	SLO; 1; 11	SLO; 2 Ret	NÜR; 1; 14	NÜR; 2; 14	SAC; 1	SAC; 2	HOC; 1; 14	HOC; 2 Ret	39th	4
2015	Yaco Racing	Audi R8 LMS Ultra	OSC; 1; 7	OSC; 2 Ret	RBR; 1; 11	RBR; 2; 11	SPA; 1; 16	SPA; 2; 7	LAU; 1; 10	LAU; 2; 10	NÜR; 1; 2	NÜR; 2; 11	SAC; 1 Ret	SAC; 2; 7	ZAN; 1; 3	ZAN; 2; 10	HOC; 1; 1	HOC; 2; 6	10th	92
2016	Yaco Racing	Audi R8 LMS	OSC; 1; 20	OSC; 2; 12	SAC; 1; 9	SAC; 2; 2	LAU; 1 Ret	LAU; 2; 22	RBR; 1	RBR; 2	NÜR; 1 Ret	NÜR; 2; 9	ZAN; 1; 12	ZAN; 2; 1	HOC; 1 Ret	HOC; 2; 6			9th	55
2017	Yaco Racing	Audi R8 LMS	OSC; 1; 25	OSC; 2; 16	LAU; 1; 11	LAU; 2; 9	RBR; 1; 10	RBR; 2; 13	ZAN; 1 Ret	ZAN; 2; 19	NÜR; 1; 16	NÜR; 2; 14	SAC; 1 Ret	SAC; 2; 17	HOC; 1; 15	HOC; 2; 16			36th	3
2018	Yaco Racing	Audi R8 LMS	OSC; 1; 28	OSC; 2; 21	MST; 1; 21	MST; 2; 22	RBR; 1; 16	RBR; 2; 21	NÜR; 1 Ret	NÜR; 2; 31	ZAN; 1; 15	ZAN; 2; 27	SAC; 1 Ret	SAC; 2; 20	HOC; 1; 20	HOC; 2; 21			NC	0
2020	Aust Motorsport	Audi R8 LMS Evo	LAU; 1; 24	LAU; 2; 26	NÜR; 1 Ret	NÜR; 2; 34	HOC; 1	HOC; 2	SAC; 1; 28	SAC; 2; 21	RBR; 1; 25	RBR; 2; 21†	LAU; 1	LAU; 2	OSC; 1; 24	OSC; 2; 21			NC	0

=== Complete GT World Challenge Europe results ===
==== GT World Challenge Europe Endurance Cup ====
Year	Team	Car	Class	1	2	3	4	5	6	7	Pos.	Points
2013	Belgian Audi Club WRT	Audi R8 LMS ultra	Pro	MNZ; 17	SIL; 8	LEC; 20	SPA; 6H; 27	SPA; 12H; 26	SPA; 24H; Ret	NÜR; 19	31st	4
2014	Audi Race Experience	Audi R8 LMS ultra	Pro	MNZ	SIL	LEC	SPA; 6H	SPA; 12H	SPA; 24H	NÜR; Ret	NC	0
2022	Iron Dames	Ferrari 488 GT3 Evo 2020	Gold	IMO; Ret	LEC; 17	SPA; 6H; 28	SPA; 12H; 21	SPA; 24H; 18	HOC; 22	**CAT**; 43	2nd	77
2023	Iron Dames	Lamborghini Huracán GT3 Evo 2	Bronze	MNZ; 28	LEC; 29	SPA; 6H; 42	SPA; 12H; Ret	SPA; 24H; Ret	**NÜR**; 37	CAT; 34	24th	10

=== Complete European Le Mans Series results ===
(key) (Races in bold indicate pole position; results in italics indicate fastest lap)

Year	Entrant	Class	Chassis	Engine	1	2	3	4	5	6	Rank	Points
2019	Kessel Racing	LMGTE	Ferrari 488 GTE	Ferrari F154CB 3.9 L Turbo V8	LEC; 2	MNZ; 6					4th	68
2019	Kessel Racing	LMGTE	Ferrari 488 GTE Evo	Ferrari F154CB 3.9 L Turbo V8			CAT; 4	SIL; 2	SPA; 4	ALG; Ret	4th	68
2020	Iron Lynx	LMGTE	Ferrari 488 GTE Evo	Ferrari F154CB 3.9 L Turbo V8	LEC; 3	SPA; 5	LEC; 3	MNZ; 3	ALG; 6		5th	61
2021	Iron Lynx	LMGTE	Ferrari 488 GTE Evo	Ferrari F154CB 3.9 L Turbo V8	CAT; 4	RBR; NC	LEC; Ret	MNZ; 6	SPA; 3	ALG; 3	9th	50
2022	Iron Lynx	LMGTE	Ferrari 488 GTE Evo	Ferrari F154CB 3.9 L Turbo V8	LEC; 4	IMO; 8	MNZ; 5	CAT	SPA	ALG	18th	26
2024	Iron Dames	LMGT3	Porsche 911 GT3 R (992)	Porsche M97/80 4.2 L Flat-6	**CAT**; Ret	**LEC**; 4	**IMO**; 1	SPA; Ret	MUG; 7	**ALG**; 2	4th	65

=== Complete IMSA SportsCar Championship results ===
(key) (Races in bold indicate pole position; races in italics indicate fastest lap)

Year	Entrant	Class	Make	Engine	1	2	3	4	5	6	7	8	9	10	11	Rank	Points	Ref
2020	GEAR Racing powered by GRT Grasser	GTD	Lamborghini Huracán GT3 Evo	Lamborghini 5.2 L V10	DAY; 16	DAY	SEB	ELK	VIR	ATL	MDO	CLT	PET	LGA	SEB	57th	15	
2023	Iron Dames	GTD	Lamborghini Huracán GT3 Evo 2	Lamborghini 5.2 L V10	DAY; 18	SEB; 11	LBH	LGA	WGL; 16	MOS	LIM	ELK	VIR	IMS	PET; 12	35th	770	
2024	Iron Dames	GTD	Lamborghini Huracán GT3 Evo 2	Lamborghini 5.2 L V10	DAY; 6	SEB; 20	LBH	LGA	WGL; 15	MOS	ELK	VIR	IMS; 18	PET; 13		39th	918	
2025	Iron Dames	GTD	Porsche 911 GT3 R (992)	Porsche M97/80 4.2 L Flat-6	DAY; 8	SEB; 11	LBH	LGA	WGL	MOS	ELK	VIR	IMS	PET		46th	471	

=== Complete 24 Hours of Daytona results ===
Year	Team	Co-Drivers	Car	Class	Laps	Ovr. Pos.	Cla. Pos.
2020	(Austria) Grasser Racing Team	(Colombia) Tatiana Calderón (United Kingdom) Katherine Legge (Denmark) Christina Nielsen	Lamborghini Huracán GT3 Evo	GTD	471	35th	16th
2023	(Italy) Iron Dames	(Belgium) Sarah Bovy (Denmark) Michelle Gatting (France) Doriane Pin	Lamborghini Huracán GT3 Evo2	GTD	659	46th	18th
2024	(Italy) Iron Dames	(Belgium) Sarah Bovy (Denmark) Michelle Gatting (France) Doriane Pin	Lamborghini Huracán GT3 Evo2	GTD	730	25th	6th
2025	(Italy) Iron Dames	(Belgium) Sarah Bovy (Switzerland) Karen Gaillard (Denmark) Michelle Gatting	Porsche 911 GT3 R (992)	GTD	719	33rd	8th

=== Complete FIA World Endurance Championship results ===
(key) (Races in bold indicate pole position) (Races in italics indicate fastest lap)

Year	Entrant	Class	Car	Engine	1	2	3	4	5	6	7	8	Rank	Points
2021	Iron Lynx	LMGTE Am	Ferrari 488 GTE Evo	Ferrari F154CB 3.9 L Turbo V8	SPA; 8	ALG; 6	MNZ; 8	LMS; 6	FUJ; 8	BHR; 8			10th	46
2022	Iron Dames	LMGTE Am	Ferrari 488 GTE Evo	Ferrari F154CB 3.9 L Turbo V8	SEB; 5	SPA; 10	LMS; 6	**MNZ**; 2	FUJ; 2	**BHR**; 3			4th	93
2023	Iron Dames	LMGTE Am	Porsche 911 RSR-19	Porsche 4.2 L Flat-6	**SEB**; 8	ALG; 3	SPA; 5	LMS; 4	**MNZ**; 5	FUJ; 4	**BHR**; 1		2nd	118
2024	Iron Dames	LMGT3	Lamborghini Huracán GT3 Evo 2	Lamborghini DGF 5.2 L V10	QAT	IMO	**SPA**; 5	LMS; 4	**SÃO**; Ret	COA; 13	FUJ; 5	BHR; 10	12th	48
2025	Iron Dames	LMGT3	Porsche 911 GT3 R (992)	Porsche 4.2 L Flat-6	QAT; 13	IMO; 8	SPA; 10	LMS; 10	SÃO; 4	COA; Ret	FUJ; 13	BHR; 12	18th	19
