= List of European Le Mans Series champions =

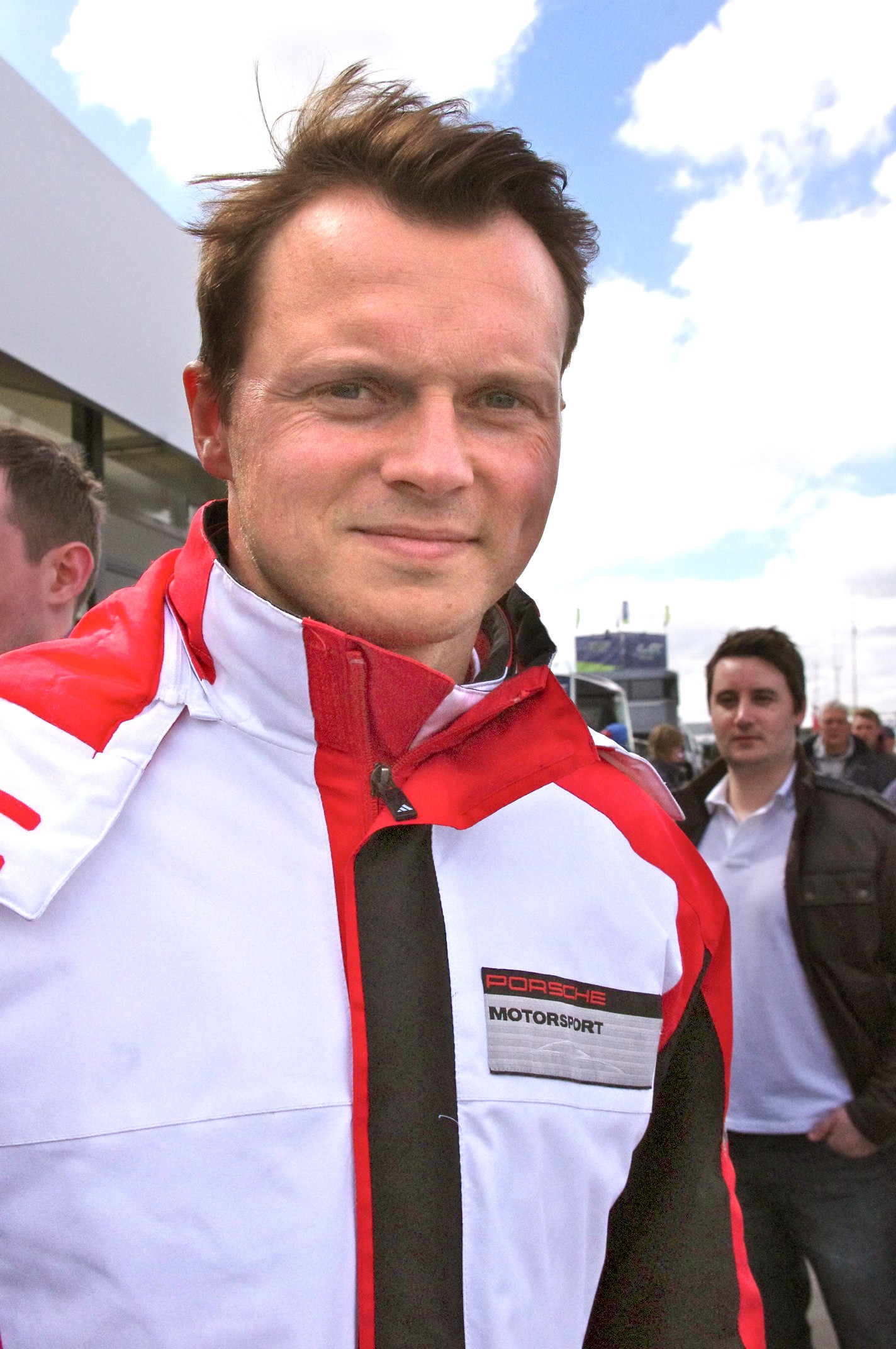
Marc Lieb has won more European Le Mans Series Drivers' Championships than any other driver with four.

The European Le Mans Series (ELMS) is a European endurance motor racing championship organised by the umbrella organisation Le Mans Endurance Management and administered by the Automobile Club de l'Ouest (ACO) automobile club. Michel Cosson, the ACO president, launched the Le Mans Endurance Series (LMES) in 2004 following the success of the American Le Mans Series at applying ACO rules in the United States. It was renamed the Le Mans Series (LMS) in 2006 and became the ELMS in 2012. It is regarded as a stepping stone for competitors aspiring to the ACO's highest endurance series, the FIA World Endurance Championship. The ACO awards European championships and trophies to the most successful drivers and teams in each of the series' categories over the course of a season. Points are awarded for individual race results as well as taking pole position, with the highest tally of points winning the respective championship or trophy. At the conclusion of the season, four champions and one runner-up receive an automatic invitation to the 24 Hours of Le Mans. The champions are not formally crowned until the ELMS awards ceremony after the season's final race.

There were four classes when the LMES was founded in 2004: Le Mans Prototype 1 (LMP1), Le Mans Prototype 2 (LMP2), Gran Turismo Special (GTS) and Grand Touring (GT). The GTS and GT categories were replaced by the Le Mans Grand Touring 1 (LMGT1) and the Le Mans Grand Touring 2 (LMGT2) classes in 2005. During the 2009 season, the entry-level Formula Le Mans Cup ran separate races at LMS events. Formula Le Mans (FLM) was later absorbed into the series in 2010. In 2011, the Le Mans Grand Touring Endurance Pro (LMGTE Pro) and Le Mans Grand Touring Endurance Am (LMGTE Am) categories replaced the LMGT2 class while LMGT1 was discontinued. The following year, LMP2 replaced LMP1 as the ELMS' top class and FLM was renamed Le Mans Prototype Challenge (LMPC) which remained until 2013.

LMGTE Pro and LMGTE Am were merged to become the LMGTE class in 2013, and the Grand Touring Challenge (GTC) category for Fédération Internationale de l'Automobile (FIA; motor racing's world governing body)-homologated GT3 cars began racing that same year. In 2015, the Le Mans Prototype 3 (LMP3) category was introduced and the GTC class was discontinued when the season ended. A Pro-Am subcategory for teams fielding at least one bronze-rated racer was added to the LMP2 class in 2021. An overall championship for both drivers and teams was introduced in the 2023 season. The LMGTE category was discontinued following the 2023 season and was replaced by the LMGT3 class for GT3 machinery in 2024.

As of the 2026 season, 159 drivers and 55 teams have won an ELMS title. Marc Lieb is the most successful ELMS driver with four championships and Proton Competition are the series' most successful team with six titles. There have been 91 drivers and 34 teams who have won a title in the LMP classes. Paul-Loup Chatin and Emmanuel Collard have earned the most LMP drivers' titles with three each and G-Drive Racing have achieved the most LMP teams' championships with four. Of the 56 drivers and 20 teams to have achieved a GT championship, Lieb's four championship wins are the most in the GT classes and Proton Competition have claimed all six of their teams' titles in the GT categories.

== Key ==
Tyre manufacturers
Symbol	Tyre manufacturer
D	Dunlop
G	Goodyear
M	Michelin
P	Pirelli

== Drivers' Championships ==
=== Overall ===
Winners of the Overall ELMS Drivers' Championship
Season	Drivers	Team	Tyre	Poles	Wins	Podiums	Points	Clinched	Margin	Ref(s)
2023	James Allen (AUS)	Algarve Pro Racing (PRT)	G	2	2	5	107	Race 6 of 6	30	
2023	Alex Lynn (GBR)	Algarve Pro Racing (PRT)	G	2	2	5	107	Race 6 of 6	30	
2023	Kyffin Simpson (BRB)	Algarve Pro Racing (PRT)	G	2	2	5	107	Race 6 of 6	30	

=== Current categories ===
==== LMP2 ====
Winners of the LMP2 ELMS Drivers' Championship
Season	Drivers	Team	Tyre	Poles	Wins	Podiums	Points	Clinched	Margin	Ref(s)
2004	Alexander Frei (CHE)	Courage Compétition (FRA)	M	3	3	3	30	Race 4 of 4	4	
2004	Sam Hancock (GBR)	Courage Compétition (FRA)	M	3	3	3	30	Race 4 of 4	4	
2005	Gareth Evans (GBR)	Chamberlain-Synergy Motorsport (GBR)	D	0	1	3	34	Race 5 of 5	1	
2006	Juan Barazi (DNK)	Barazi-Epsilon (FRA)	M	0	1	1	28	Race 5 of 5	2	
2006	Michael Vergers (NLD)	Barazi-Epsilon (FRA)	M	0	1	1	28	Race 5 of 5	2	
2007	Thomas Erdos (BRA)	RML (GBR)	M	2	2	3	36	Race 6 of 6	6	
2007	Mike Newton (GBR)	RML (GBR)	M	2	2	3	36	Race 6 of 6	6	
2008	Jos Verstappen (NLD)	Van Merksteijn Motorsport (NLD)	M	5	4	5	48	Race 4 of 5	10	
2009	Miguel Amaral (PRT)	Quifel ASM Team (PRT)	D	3	2	3	33	Race 5 of 5	9	
2009	Olivier Pla (FRA)	Quifel ASM Team (PRT)	D	3	2	3	33	Race 5 of 5	9	
2010	Thomas Erdos (BRA)	RML (GBR)	D	0	1	3	75	Race 5 of 5	6	
2010	Mike Newton (GBR)	RML (GBR)	D	0	1	3	75	Race 5 of 5	6	
2011	Tom Kimber-Smith (GBR)	Greaves Motorsport (GBR)	D	1	3	4	50	Race 4 of 5	3	
2011	Karim Ojjeh (SAU)	Greaves Motorsport (GBR)	D	1	3	4	50	Race 4 of 5	3	
2012	Mathias Beche (CHE)	Thiriet by TDS Racing (FRA)	D	1	2	3	94	Race 3 of 3	32	
2012	Pierre Thiriet (FRA)	Thiriet by TDS Racing (FRA)	D	1	2	3	94	Race 3 of 3	32	
2013	Nelson Panciatici (FRA)	Signatech Alpine (FRA)	D	0	1	3	85	Race 5 of 5	18	
2013	Pierre Ragues (FRA)	Signatech Alpine (FRA)	D	0	1	3	85	Race 5 of 5	18	
2014	Paul-Loup Chatin (FRA)	Signatech Alpine (FRA)	M/D	0	1	3	78	Race 5 of 5	4	
2014	Nelson Panciatici (FRA)	Signatech Alpine (FRA)	M/D	0	1	3	78	Race 5 of 5	4	
2014	Oliver Webb (GBR)	Signatech Alpine (FRA)	M/D	0	1	3	78	Race 5 of 5	4	
2015	Gary Hirsch (CHE)	Greaves Motorsport (GBR)	D	1	2	3	93	Race 5 of 5	2	
2015	Jon Lancaster (GBR)	Greaves Motorsport (GBR)	D	1	2	3	93	Race 5 of 5	2	
2015	Björn Wirdheim (SWE)	Greaves Motorsport (GBR)	D	1	2	3	93	Race 5 of 5	2	
2016	Simon Dolan (GBR)	G-Drive Racing (RUS)	D	0	2	4	103	Race 6 of 6	7	
2016	Harry Tincknell (GBR)	G-Drive Racing (RUS)	D	0	2	4	103	Race 6 of 6	7	
2016	Giedo van der Garde (NLD)	G-Drive Racing (RUS)	D	0	2	4	103	Race 6 of 6	7	
2017	Memo Rojas (MEX)	G-Drive Racing (RUS)	D	1	1	5	110	Race 6 of 6	12	
2017	Léo Roussel (FRA)	G-Drive Racing (RUS)	D	1	1	5	110	Race 6 of 6	12	
2018	Andrea Pizzitola (FRA)	G-Drive Racing (RUS)	D	1	3	3	100.25	Race 5 of 6	34.25	
2018	Roman Rusinov (RUS)	G-Drive Racing (RUS)	D	1	3	3	100.25	Race 5 of 6	34.25	
2019	Paul-Loup Chatin (FRA)	IDEC Sport (FRA)	M	1	2	4	105	Race 6 of 6	4	
2019	Paul Lafargue (FRA)	IDEC Sport (FRA)	M	1	2	4	105	Race 6 of 6	4	
2019	Memo Rojas (MEX)	IDEC Sport (FRA)	M	1	2	4	105	Race 6 of 6	4	
2020	Filipe Albuquerque (PRT)	United Autosports (GBR)	M	4	3	5	109	Race 4 of 5	39	
2020	Phil Hanson (GBR)	United Autosports (GBR)	M	4	3	5	109	Race 4 of 5	39	
2021	Louis Delétraz (CHE)	Team WRT (BEL)	G	0	3	4	118	Race 6 of 6	32	
2021	Robert Kubica (POL)	Team WRT (BEL)	G	0	3	4	118	Race 6 of 6	32	
2021	Yifei Ye (CHN)	Team WRT (BEL)	G	0	3	4	118	Race 6 of 6	32	
2022	Louis Delétraz (CHE)	Prema Racing (ITA)	G	0	4	5	125	Race 6 of 6	31	
2022	Ferdinand Habsburg (AUT)	Prema Racing (ITA)	G	0	4	5	125	Race 6 of 6	31	
2023	James Allen (AUS)	Algarve Pro Racing (PRT)	G	2	2	5	113	Race 6 of 6	13	
2023	Alex Lynn (GBR)	Algarve Pro Racing (PRT)	G	2	2	5	113	Race 6 of 6	13	
2023	Kyffin Simpson (BRB)	Algarve Pro Racing (PRT)	G	2	2	5	113	Race 6 of 6	13	
2024	Louis Delétraz (CHE)	AO by TF (USA)	G	1	1	4	93	Race 6 of 6	12	
2024	Jonny Edgar (GBR)	AO by TF (USA)	G	1	1	4	93	Race 6 of 6	12	
2024	Robert Kubica (POL)	AO by TF (USA)	G	1	1	4	93	Race 6 of 6	12	
2025	Oliver Gray (GBR)	VDS Panis Racing (FRA)	G	1	3	4	106	Race 6 of 6	14	
2025	Esteban Masson (FRA)	VDS Panis Racing (FRA)	G	1	3	4	106	Race 6 of 6	14	
2025	Charles Milesi (FRA)	VDS Panis Racing (FRA)	G	1	3	4	106	Race 6 of 6	14	
2026	Ben Hanley (GBR)	United Autosports (GBR)	G	0	2	5	111	Race 6 of 6	27	
2026	Griffin Peebles (AUS)	United Autosports (GBR)	G	0	2	5	111	Race 6 of 6	27	
2026	Grégoire Saucy (CHE)	United Autosports (GBR)	G	0	2	5	111	Race 6 of 6	27	

==== LMP2 Pro-Am ====
Winners of the LMP2 Pro-Am ELMS Drivers' Championship
Season	Drivers	Team	Tyre	Poles	Wins	Podiums	Points	Clinched	Margin	Ref(s)
2021	John Falb (USA)	G-Drive Racing (RAF)	G	0	2	6	122	Race 6 of 6	16	
2021	Rui Andrade (ANG)	G-Drive Racing (RAF)	G	0	2	6	122	Race 6 of 6	16	
2022	Charlie Eastwood (IRL)	Racing Team Turkey (TUR)	G	1	4	5	131	Race 6 of 6	25	
2022	Salih Yoluç (TUR)	Racing Team Turkey (TUR)	G	1	4	5	131	Race 6 of 6	25	
2023	François Perrodo (FRA)	AF Corse (ITA)	G	0	2	5	110	Race 6 of 6	9	
2023	Matthieu Vaxivière (FRA)	AF Corse (ITA)	G	0	2	5	110	Race 6 of 6	9	
2024	François Perrodo (FRA)	AF Corse (ITA)	G	0	2	3	98	Race 6 of 6	2	
2024	Alessio Rovera (ITA)	AF Corse (ITA)	G	0	2	3	98	Race 6 of 6	2	
2024	Matthieu Vaxivière (FRA)	AF Corse (ITA)	G	0	2	3	98	Race 6 of 6	2	
2025	Dane Cameron (USA)	AO by TF (USA)	G	2	1	5	100	Race 6 of 6	5	
2025	Louis Delétraz (CHE)	AO by TF (USA)	G	2	1	5	100	Race 6 of 6	5	
2025	P. J. Hyett (USA)	AO by TF (USA)	G	2	1	5	100	Race 6 of 6	5	
2026	Malthe Jakobsen (DNK)	Algarve Pro Racing (PRT)	G	0	2	4	86	Race 6 of 6	9	
2026	Michael Jensen (DNK)	Algarve Pro Racing (PRT)	G	0	2	4	86	Race 6 of 6	9	
2026	Enzo Trulli (ITA)	Algarve Pro Racing (PRT)	G	0	2	4	86	Race 6 of 6	9	

==== LMP3 ====
Winners of the LMP3 ELMS Drivers' Championship
Season	Drivers	Team	Tyre	Poles	Wins	Podiums	Points	Clinched	Margin	Ref(s)
2015	Chris Hoy (GBR)	Team LNT (GBR)	M	0	2	3	94	Race 4 of 5	36	
2015	Charlie Robertson (GBR)	Team LNT (GBR)	M	0	2	3	94	Race 4 of 5	36	
2016	Alex Brundle (GBR)	United Autosports (USA)	M	1	3	5	109.5	Race 5 of 6	36.5	
2016	Christian England (GBR)	United Autosports (USA)	M	1	3	5	109.5	Race 5 of 6	36.5	
2016	Mike Guasch (USA)	United Autosports (USA)	M	1	3	5	109.5	Race 5 of 6	36.5	
2017	John Falb (USA)	United Autosports (USA)	M	0	2	5	103	Race 6 of 6	22	
2017	Sean Rayhall (USA)	United Autosports (USA)	M	0	2	5	103	Race 6 of 6	22	
2018	John Farano (CAN)	RLR MSport (GBR)	M	0	2	3	77.5	Race 6 of 6	7.25	
2018	Rob Garofall (GBR)	RLR MSport (GBR)	M	0	2	3	77.5	Race 6 of 6	7.25	
2018	Job van Uitert (NLD)	RLR MSport (GBR)	M	0	2	3	77.5	Race 6 of 6	7.25	
2019	Mikkel Jensen (DNK)	Eurointernational (USA)	M	1	3	2	102	Race 5 of 6	7.25	
2019	Jens Petersen (DEU)	Eurointernational (USA)	M	1	3	2	102	Race 5 of 6	7.25	
2020	Wayne Boyd (GBR)	United Autosports (GBR)	M	4	3	4	94	Race 5 of 5	21	
2020	Tom Gamble (GBR)	United Autosports (GBR)	M	4	3	4	94	Race 5 of 5	21	
2020	Robert Wheldon (GBR)	United Autosports (GBR)	M	4	3	4	94	Race 5 of 5	21	
2021	Laurents Hörr (DEU)	DKR Engineering (LUX)	M	4	3	3	105	Race 6 of 6	1	
2022	Mike Benham (GBR)	Cool Racing (CHE)	M	6	2	4	86	Race 6 of 6	7	
2022	Malthe Jakobsen (DNK)	Cool Racing (CHE)	M	6	2	4	86	Race 6 of 6	7	
2022	Maurice Smith (USA)	Cool Racing (CHE)	M	6	2	4	86	Race 6 of 6	7	
2023	Adrien Chila (FRA)	Cool Racing (CHE)	M	1	3	5	121	Race 6 of 6	51	
2023	Alex García (MEX)	Cool Racing (CHE)	M	1	3	5	121	Race 6 of 6	51	
2023	Marcos Siebert (ARG)	Cool Racing (CHE)	M	1	3	5	121	Race 6 of 6	51	
2024	Nick Adcock (GBR)	RLR MSport (GBR)	M	2	1	3	99	Race 6 of 6	1	
2024	Michael Jensen (DNK)	RLR MSport (GBR)	M	2	1	3	99	Race 6 of 6	1	
2024	Gaël Julien (FRA)	RLR MSport (GBR)	M	2	1	3	99	Race 6 of 6	1	
2025	Adrien Closmenil (FRA)	CLX Motorsport (CHE)	M	5	5	5	130	Race 5 of 6	61	
2025	Theodor Jensen (DNK)	CLX Motorsport (CHE)	M	5	5	5	130	Race 5 of 6	61	
2025	Paul Lanchère (FRA)	CLX Motorsport (CHE)	M	5	5	5	130	Race 5 of 6	61	
2026	Alexander Jacoby (BRA)	CLX Motorsport (CHE)	M	3	3	4	110	Race 6 of 6	14	
2026	Paul Lanchère (FRA)	CLX Motorsport (CHE)	M	3	3	4	110	Race 6 of 6	14	

==== LMGT3 ====
Winners of the LMGT3 ELMS Drivers' Championship
Season	Drivers	Team	Tyre	Poles	Wins	Podiums	Points	Clinched	Margin	Ref(s)
2024	Andrea Caldarelli (ITA)	Iron Lynx (ITA)	G	1	1	4	76	Race 6 of 6	2	
2024	Hiroshi Hamaguchi (JPN)	Iron Lynx (ITA)	G	1	1	4	76	Race 6 of 6	2	
2024	Axcil Jefferies (ZWE)	Iron Lynx (ITA)	G	1	1	4	76	Race 6 of 6	2	
2025	Rui Andrade (ANG)	TF Sport (GBR)	G	1	2	3	78	Race 6 of 6	8	
2025	Charlie Eastwood (IRL)	TF Sport (GBR)	G	1	2	3	78	Race 6 of 6	8	
2025	Hiroshi Koizumi (JPN)	TF Sport (GBR)	G	1	2	3	78	Race 6 of 6	8	
2026	Charlie Eastwood (IRL)	TF Sport (GBR)	G	1	2	4	88	Race 6 of 6	2	
2026	Blake McDonald (USA)	TF Sport (GBR)	G	1	2	4	88	Race 6 of 6	2	
2026	Alec Udell (USA)	TF Sport (GBR)	G	1	2	4	88	Race 6 of 6	2	

=== Defunct categories ===
==== LMP1 ====
Winners of the LMP1 ELMS Drivers' Championship
Season	Drivers	Team	Tyre	Poles	Wins	Podiums	Points	Clinched	Margin	Ref
2004	Johnny Herbert (GBR)	Audi Sport UK Team Veloqx (GBR)	M	0	2	4	34	Race 4 of 4	6	
2004	Jamie Davies (GBR)	Audi Sport UK Team Veloqx (GBR)	M	0	2	4	34	Race 4 of 4	6	
2005	Jean-Christophe Boullion (FRA)	Pescarolo Sport (FRA)	M	2	2	3	34	Race 5 of 5	2	
2005	Emmanuel Collard (FRA)	Pescarolo Sport (FRA)	M	2	2	3	34	Race 5 of 5	2	
2006	Jean-Christophe Boullion (FRA)	Pescarolo Sport (FRA)	M	2	5	5	50	Race 4 of 5	30	
2006	Emmanuel Collard (FRA)	Pescarolo Sport (FRA)	M	2	5	5	50	Race 4 of 5	30	
2007	Pedro Lamy (PRT)	Team Peugeot Total (FRA)	M	1	3	5	40	Race 6 of 6	3.5	
2007	Stéphane Sarrazin (FRA)	Team Peugeot Total (FRA)	M	1	3	5	40	Race 6 of 6	3.5	
2008	Alexandre Prémat (FRA)	Audi Sport Team Joest (DEU)	M	0	0	4	35	Race 5 of 5	3	
2008	Mike Rockenfeller (DEU)	Audi Sport Team Joest (DEU)	M	0	0	4	35	Race 5 of 5	3	
2009	Jan Charouz (CZE)	AMR Eastern Europe (CZE)	M	0	2	5	39	Race 5 of 5	13	
2009	Tomáš Enge (CZE)	AMR Eastern Europe (CZE)	M	0	2	5	39	Race 5 of 5	13	
2009	Stefan Mücke (DEU)	AMR Eastern Europe (CZE)	M	0	2	5	39	Race 5 of 5	13	
2010	Stéphane Sarrazin (FRA)	Team Oreca Matmut (FRA)	M	0	1	3	78	Race 5 of 5	15	
2011	Emmanuel Collard (FRA)	Pescarolo Team (FRA)	M	0	2	2	50	Race 5 of 5	3	
2011	Julien Jousse (FRA)	Pescarolo Team (FRA)	M	0	2	2	50	Race 5 of 5	3	

==== LMGTS ====
Winners of the LMGTS ELMS Drivers' Championship
Season	Drivers	Team	Tyre	Poles	Wins	Podiums	Points	Clinched	Margin	Ref
2004	Christophe Bouchut (FRA)	Larbre Compétition (FRA)	M	1	4	4	35	Race 4 of 4	14.5	
2004	Pedro Lamy (PRT)	Larbre Compétition (FRA)	M	1	4	4	35	Race 4 of 4	14.5	
2004	Steve Zacchia (CHE)	Larbre Compétition (FRA)	M	1	4	4	35	Race 4 of 4	14.5	

==== LMGT ====
Winner of the LMGT ELMS Drivers' Championship
Season	Drivers	Team	Tyre	Poles	Wins	Podiums	Points	Clinched	Margin	Ref
2004	Roman Rusinov (RUS)	JMB Racing (MCO)	D	0	1	2	25	Race 4 of 4	1	

==== LMGT1 ====
Winners of the LMGT1 ELMS Drivers' Championship
Season	Drivers	Team	Tyre	Poles	Wins	Podiums	Points	Clinched	Margin	Ref
2005	Michele Bartyan (ITA)	BMS Scuderia Italia (ITA)	P	1	2	4	35	Race 5 of 5	0 (Note: The two teams from cars No. 51 and No. 52 were tied on points at the end of the championship. The crew of the No. 51 BMS Scuderia Italia Ferrari – Michele Bartyan, Christian Pescatori and Toni Seiler – were declared champions because they had won two races to Matteo Cressoni's (No. 52) one.)	
2005	Christian Pescatori (ITA)	BMS Scuderia Italia (ITA)	P	1	2	4	35	Race 5 of 5	0	
2005	Toni Seiler (CHE)	BMS Scuderia Italia (ITA)	P	1	2	4	35	Race 5 of 5	0	
2006	Gabriele Gardel (CHE)	Aston Martin Racing Larbre (FRA)	M	2	2	3	32	Race 5 of 5	4	
2006	Pedro Lamy (PRT)	Aston Martin Racing Larbre (FRA)	M	2	2	3	32	Race 5 of 5	4	
2006	Vincent Vosse (BEL)	Aston Martin Racing Larbre (FRA)	M	2	2	3	32	Race 5 of 5	4	
2007	Soheil Ayari (FRA)	Team Oreca (FRA)	M	4	4	4	40	Race 6 of 6	3	
2007	Stéphane Ortelli (MCO)	Team Oreca (FRA)	M	4	4	4	40	Race 6 of 6	3	
2008	Patrice Goueslard (FRA)	Luc Alphand Aventures (FRA)	M	0	2	5	42	Race 5 of 5	6	
2008	Guillaume Moreau (FRA)	Luc Alphand Aventures (FRA)	M	0	2	5	42	Race 5 of 5	6	
2009	Yann Clairay (FRA)	Luc Alphand Aventures (FRA)	D	1	2	5	39	Race 5 of 5	10	
2009	Patrice Goueslard (FRA)	Luc Alphand Aventures (FRA)	D	1	2	5	39	Race 5 of 5	10	
2010	Gabriele Gardel (CHE)	Larbre Compétition (FRA)	M	2	4	4	97	Race 4 of 5	33	
2010	Patrice Goueslard (FRA)	Larbre Compétition (FRA)	M	2	4	4	97	Race 4 of 5	33	

==== LMGT2 ====
Winners of the LMGT2 ELMS Drivers' Championship
Season	Drivers	Team	Tyre	Poles	Wins	Podiums	Points	Clinched	Margin	Ref
2005	Marc Lieb (DEU)	Sebah Automotive (GBR)	D	0	3	3	30	Race 4 of 5	2	
2005	Xavier Pompidou (FRA)	Sebah Automotive (GBR)	D	0	3	3	30	Race 4 of 5	2	
2006	Joël Camathias (CHE)	Autorlando Sport (ITA)	P	1	1	3	34	Race 4 of 5	13	
2006	Marc Lieb (DEU)	Autorlando Sport (ITA)	P	1	1	3	34	Race 4 of 5	13	
2007	Rob Bell (GBR)	Virgo Motorsport (GBR)	D	2	2	6	48	Race 5 of 6	9	
2007	Rob Bell (GBR)	JMB Racing (MCO)	D	2	2	6	48	Race 5 of 6	9	
2008	Rob Bell (GBR)	Virgo Motorsport (GBR)	D	1	4	4	40	Race 5 of 5	5	
2009	Marc Lieb (DEU)	Team Felbermayr-Proton (DEU)	D	3	3	3	36	Race 5 of 5	1	
2009	Richard Lietz (AUT)	Team Felbermayr-Proton (DEU)	D	3	3	3	36	Race 5 of 5	1	
2010	Marc Lieb (DEU)	Team Felbermayr-Proton (DEU)	M	0	3	4	87	Race 4 of 5	21	
2010	Richard Lietz (AUT)	Team Felbermayr-Proton (DEU)	M	0	3	4	87	Race 4 of 5	21	

==== FLM ====
Winners of the FLM ELMS Drivers' Championship
Season	Drivers	Team	Tyre	Poles	Wins	Podiums	Points	Clinched	Margin	Ref
2010	Andrea Barlesi (BEL)	DAMS (FRA)	M	0	1	3	59	Race 5 of 5	2	
2010	Gary Chalandon (FRA)	DAMS (FRA)	M	0	1	3	59	Race 5 of 5	2	
2011	Julien Schell (FRA)	Pegasus Racing (FRA)	M	0	4	5	73	Race 4 of 5	28	
2011	Mirco Schultis (DEU)	Pegasus Racing (FRA)	M	0	4	5	73	Race 4 of 5	28	
2011	Patrick Simon (DEU)	Pegasus Racing (FRA)	M	0	4	5	73	Race 4 of 5	28	

==== LMGTE Pro ====
Winners of the LMGTE Pro ELMS Drivers' Championship
Season	Drivers	Team	Tyre	Poles	Wins	Podiums	Points	Clinched	Margin	Ref
2011	Gianmaria Bruni (ITA)	AF Corse (ITA)	M	1	2	4	60	Race 4 of 5	14	
2011	Giancarlo Fisichella (ITA)	AF Corse (ITA)	M	1	2	4	60	Race 4 of 5	14	
2012	Jonny Cocker (GBR)	JMW Motorsport (GBR)	D	1	2	2	51	Race 2 of 3	25	

==== LMGTE Am ====
Winners of the LMGTE Am ELMS Drivers' Championship
Season	Drivers	Team	Tyre	Poles	Wins	Podiums	Points	Clinched	Margin	Ref
2011	Nicolas Armindo (FRA)	IMSA Performance Matmut (FRA)	M	4	4	4	75	Race 5 of 5	27	
2011	Raymond Narac (FRA)	IMSA Performance Matmut (FRA)	M	4	4	4	75	Race 5 of 5	27	
2012	Nicolas Armindo (FRA)	IMSA Performance Matmut (FRA)	M	0	2	3	94	Race 3 of 3	60	
2012	Raymond Narac (FRA)	IMSA Performance Matmut (FRA)	M	0	2	3	94	Race 3 of 3	60	
2012	Anthony Pons (FRA)	IMSA Performance Matmut (FRA)	M	0	2	3	94	Race 3 of 3	60	

==== LMPC ====
Winners of the LMPC ELMS Drivers' Championship
Season	Drivers	Team	Tyre	Poles	Wins	Podiums	Points	Clinched	Margin	Ref
2012	John Hartshone (GBR)	Boutsen Ginion Racing (BEL)	M	0	2	2	51	Race 2 of 3	26	
2012	John Hartshone (GBR)	CURTIS Racing Technologies (GBR)	M	0	2	2	51	Race 2 of 3	26	
2013	Paul-Loup Chatin (FRA)	Team Endurance Challenge (FRA)	M	4	3	5	115	Race 5 of 5	17	
2013	Gary Hirsch (FRA)	Team Endurance Challenge (FRA)	M	4	3	5	115	Race 5 of 5	17	

==== GTC ====
Winners of the GTC ELMS Drivers' Championship
Season	Drivers	Team	Tyre	Poles	Wins	Podiums	Points	Clinched	Margin	Ref
2013	Fabio Babini (ITA)	SMP Racing (RUS)	M	0	4	4	100	Race 5 of 5	24	
2013	Kirill Ladygin (RUS)	SMP Racing (RUS)	M	0	4	4	100	Race 5 of 5	24	
2013	Viktor Shaytar (RUS)	SMP Racing (RUS)	M	0	4	4	100	Race 5 of 5	24	
2014	Olivier Beretta (MCO)	SMP Racing (RUS)	M	0	1	5	94	Race 5 of 5	15.5	
2014	Anton Ladygin (RUS)	SMP Racing (RUS)	M	0	1	5	94	Race 5 of 5	15.5	
2014	Devi Markozov (RUS)	SMP Racing (RUS)	M	0	1	5	94	Race 5 of 5	15.5	
2015	Eric Dermont (FRA)	TDS Racing (FRA)	D	3	2	4	101	Race 5 of 5	20	
2015	Dino Lunardi (FRA)	TDS Racing (FRA)	D	3	2	4	101	Race 5 of 5	20	
2015	Franck Perera (FRA)	TDS Racing (FRA)	D	3	2	4	101	Race 5 of 5	20	

==== LMGTE ====
Winners of the LMGTE ELMS Drivers' Championship
Season	Drivers	Team	Tyre	Poles	Wins	Podiums	Points	Clinched	Margin	Ref(s)
2013	Matt Griffin (IRL)	Ram Racing (GBR)	M	3	3	5	114	Race 4 of 5	34	
2013	Johnny Mowlem (GBR)	Ram Racing (GBR)	M	3	3	5	114	Race 4 of 5	34	
2014	Andrea Bertolini (ITA)	SMP Racing (RUS)	M	3	2	3	85	Race 5 of 5	3.5	
2014	Viktor Shaytar (RUS)	SMP Racing (RUS)	M	3	2	3	85	Race 5 of 5	3.5	
2014	Sergey Zlobin (RUS)	SMP Racing (RUS)	M	3	2	3	85	Race 5 of 5	3.5	
2015	Johnny Laursen (DNK)	Formula Racing (DNK)	D	0	2	3	83	Race 5 of 5	4	
2015	Mikkel Mac (DNK)	Formula Racing (DNK)	D	0	2	3	83	Race 5 of 5	4	
2015	Andrea Rizzoli (ITA)	Formula Racing (DNK)	D	0	2	3	83	Race 5 of 5	4	
2016	Andrew Howard (GBR)	Aston Martin Racing (GBR)	D	1	2	3	98	Race 6 of 6	5	
2016	Alex MacDowall (GBR)	Aston Martin Racing (GBR)	D	1	2	3	98	Race 6 of 6	5	
2016	Darren Turner (GBR)	Aston Martin Racing (GBR)	D	1	2	3	98	Race 6 of 6	5	
2017	Jody Fannin (GBR)	JMW Motorsport (GBR)	D	0	1	5	104	Race 6 of 6	2	
2017	Robert Smith (GBR)	JMW Motorsport (GBR)	D	0	1	5	104	Race 6 of 6	2	
2018	Gianluca Roda (ITA)	Proton Competition (DEU)	D	2	1	5	95.5	Race 6 of 6	7.5	
2018	Giorgio Roda (ITA)	Proton Competition (DEU)	D	2	1	5	95.5	Race 6 of 6	7.5	
2019	Fabien Lavergne (FRA)	Luzich Racing (CHE)	D	0	4	5	127	Race 5 of 6	51	
2019	Nicklas Nielsen (DNK)	Luzich Racing (CHE)	D	0	4	5	127	Race 5 of 6	51	
2019	Alessandro Pier Guidi (ITA)	Luzich Racing (CHE)	D	0	4	5	127	Race 5 of 6	51	
2020	Alessio Picariello (BEL)	Proton Competition (DEU)	G	1	2	4	99	Race 5 of 5	0 (Note: At the conclusion of the season, the two teams from vehicles Nos. 77 and 74 had each scored 99 points. Both crews had achieved two victories, finished second once, secured one fourth position, and took two pole positions over each of the five events. Proton Competition's No. 77 Porsche team of Michele Beretta, Alessio Picariello and Christian Ried were crowned champions for winning the season-opening round at Circuit Paul Ricard.)	
2020	Michele Beretta (ITA)	Proton Competition (DEU)	G	1	2	4	99	Race 5 of 5	0	
2020	Christian Ried (DEU)	Proton Competition (DEU)	G	1	2	4	99	Race 5 of 5	0	
2021	Matteo Cressoni (ITA)	Iron Lynx (ITA)	G	0	3	6	126	Race 6 of 6	37	
2021	Rino Mastronardi (ITA)	Iron Lynx (ITA)	G	0	3	6	126	Race 6 of 6	37	
2021	Miguel Molina (ESP)	Iron Lynx (ITA)	G	0	3	6	126	Race 6 of 6	37	
2022	Gianmaria Bruni (ITA)	Proton Competition (DEU)	G	1	1	3	82	Race 6 of 6	4	
2022	Lorenzo Ferrari (ITA)	Proton Competition (DEU)	G	1	1	3	82	Race 6 of 6	4	
2022	Christian Ried (DEU)	Proton Competition (DEU)	G	1	1	3	82	Race 6 of 6	4	
2023	Ryan Hardwick (USA)	Proton Competition (DEU)	G	2	2	5	105	Race 6 of 6	20	
2023	Alessio Picariello (BEL)	Proton Competition (DEU)	G	2	2	5	105	Race 6 of 6	20	
2023	Zacharie Robichon (CAN)	Proton Competition (DEU)	G	2	2	5	105	Race 6 of 6	20	

== Teams' Championships ==
=== Overall ===
Winners of the Overall ELMS Teams' Championship
Season	Team	Cars	Tyre	Poles	Wins	Podiums	Points	Clinched	Margin	Ref(s)
2023	Algarve Pro Racing (PRT)	Oreca 07-Gibson	G	2	2	5	110	Race 6 of 6	9	
2024	AO by TF (USA)	Oreca 07-Gibson	G	1	1	4	93	Race 6 of 6	12	

=== Current categories ===
==== LMP2 ====
Winners of the LMP2 ELMS Teams' Championship
Season	Team	Cars	Tyre	Poles	Wins	Podiums	Points	Clinched	Margin	Ref(s)
2004	Courage Compétition (FRA)	Courage C65-AER	M	3	3	3	30	Race 4 of 4	4	
2005	Chamberlain-Synergy Motorsport (GBR)	Lola B05/40-AER	D	0	1	3	34	Race 5 of 5	1	
2006	Barazi-Epsilon (FRA)	Courage C65-AER	M	0	1	1	28	Race 5 of 5	2	
2007	RML (GBR)	MG-Lola EX264-AER	M	2	2	3	36	Race 6 of 6	6	
2008	Van Merksteijn Motorsport (NLD)	Porsche RS Spyder Evo	M	5	4	5	48	Race 4 of 5	16	
2009	Quifel ASM Team (PRT)	Ginetta-Zytek GZ09S/2	D	3	2	3	33	Race 5 of 5	7	
2010	RML (GBR)	Lola B08/80-HPD	D	0	1	3	75	Race 5 of 5	6	
2011	Greaves Motorsport (GBR)	Zytek Z11SN-Nissan	D	1	3	4	64	Race 4 of 5	21	
2012	Thiriet by TDS Racing (FRA)	Oreca 03-Nissan	D	1	2	3	94	Race 3 of 3	23	
2013	Signatech Alpine (FRA)	Alpine A450-Nissan	D	0	1	3	85	Race 5 of 5	18	
2014	Signatech Alpine (FRA)	Alpine A450-Nissan	M/D	0	1	3	78	Race 5 of 5	4	
2015	Greaves Motorsport (GBR)	Gibson 015S-Nissan	D	1	2	3	93	Race 5 of 5	2	
2016	G-Drive Racing (RUS)	Gibson 015S-Nissan	D	0	2	4	103	Race 6 of 6	7	
2017	G-Drive Racing (RUS)	Oreca 07-Gibson	D	1	1	5	110	Race 6 of 6	12	
2018	G-Drive Racing (RUS)	Oreca 07-Gibson	D	1	3	3	100.25	Race 5 of 6	34.25	
2019	IDEC Sport (FRA)	Oreca 07-Gibson	M	2	1	3	105	Race 6 of 6	4	
2020	United Autosports (GBR)	Oreca 07-Gibson	M	4	3	5	109	Race 4 of 5	39	
2021	Team WRT (BEL)	Oreca 07-Gibson	G	0	3	4	118	Race 6 of 6	32	
2022	Prema Racing (ITA)	Oreca 07-Gibson	G	0	4	5	125	Race 6 of 6	31	
2023	Algarve Pro Racing (PRT)	Oreca 07-Gibson	G	2	2	5	113	Race 6 of 6	13	
2024	AO by TF (USA)	Oreca 07-Gibson	G	1	1	4	93	Race 6 of 6	12	
2025	VDS Panis Racing (FRA)	Oreca 07-Gibson	G	1	3	4	106	Race 6 of 6	14	
2026	United Autosports (GBR)	Oreca 07-Gibson	G	1	2	5	111	Race 6 of 6	27	

==== LMP2 Pro-Am ====
Winners of the LMP2 Pro-Am ELMS Teams' Championship
Season	Team	Cars	Tyre	Poles	Wins	Podiums	Points	Clinched	Margin	Ref(s)
2021	G-Drive Racing (RAF)	Aurus 01-Gibson	G	0	2	6	122	Race 6 of 6	16	
2022	Racing Team Turkey (TUR)	Oreca 07-Gibson	G	1	4	5	131	Race 6 of 6	30	
2023	AF Corse (ITA)	Oreca 07-Gibson	G	0	2	5	110	Race 6 of 6	9	
2024	AF Corse (ITA)	Oreca 07-Gibson	G	0	2	3	98	Race 6 of 6	2	
2025	AO by TF (USA)	Oreca 07-Gibson	G	2	1	5	100	Race 6 of 6	5	
2026	Algarve Pro Racing (PRT)	Oreca 07-Gibson	G	0	2	4	86	Race 6 of 6	9	

==== LMP3 ====
Winners of the LMP3 ELMS Teams' Championship
Season	Team	Cars	Tyre	Poles	Wins	Podiums	Points	Clinched	Margin	Ref
2015	Team LNT (GBR)	Ginetta-Juno LMP3-Nissan	M	0	2	3	94	Race 4 of 5	36	
2016	United Autosports (USA)	Ligier JS P3-Nissan	M	1	2	3	109.5	Race 5 of 6	36.5	
2017	United Autosports (USA)	Ligier JS P3-Nissan	M	0	2	5	103	Race 6 of 6	22	
2018	RLR MSport (GBR)	Ligier JS P3-Nissan	M	0	2	3	77.5	Race 6 of 6	7.25	
2019	Eurointernational (USA)	Ligier JS P3-Nissan	M	1	3	2	102	Race 5 of 6	7.25	
2020	United Autosports (GBR)	Ligier JS P320-Nissan	M	4	3	4	94	Race 5 of 5	21	
2021	DKR Engineering (LUX)	Duqueine D08-Nissan	M	4	3	3	105	Race 6 of 6	1	
2022	Cool Racing (CHE)	Ligier JS P320-Nissan	M	6	2	4	86	Race 6 of 6	7	
2023	Cool Racing (CHE)	Ligier JS P320-Nissan	M	1	3	5	121	Race 6 of 6	51	
2024	RLR MSport (GBR)	Ligier JS P320-Nissan	M	2	1	3	99	Race 6 of 6	1	
2025	CLX Motorsport (CHE)	Ligier JS P325-Toyota	M	5	5	5	130	Race 5 of 6	61	
2026	CLX Motorsport (CHE)	Ligier JS P325-Toyota	M	2	3	4	110	Race 6 of 6	33	

==== LMGT3 ====
Winners of the LMGT3 ELMS Teams' Championship
Season	Team	Cars	Tyre	Poles	Wins	Podiums	Points	Clinched	Margin	Ref(s)
2024	Iron Lynx (ITA)	Lamborghini Huracán GT3 Evo 2	G	1	1	4	76	Race 6 of 6	2	
2025	TF Sport (GBR)	Chevrolet Corvette Z06 GT3.R	G	1	2	3	78	Race 6 of 6	8	
2026	TF Sport (GBR)	Chevrolet Corvette Z06 GT3.R	G	1	1	4	88	Race 6 of 6	2	

=== Defunct categories ===
==== LMP1 ====
Winners of the LMP1 ELMS Teams' Championship
Season	Team	Cars	Tyre	Poles	Wins	Podiums	Points	Clinched	Margin	Ref
2004	Audi Sport UK Team Veloqx (GBR)	Audi R8	M	0	2	4	34	Race 4 of 4	6	
2005	Pescarolo Sport (FRA)	Pescarolo C60 Hybrid-Judd	M	2	2	3	34	Race 5 of 5	2	
2006	Pescarolo Sport (FRA)	Pescarolo C60 Hybrid-Judd	M	2	5	5	50	Race 4 of 5	30	
2007	Team Peugeot Total (FRA)	Peugeot 908 HDi FAP	M	1	3	5	40	Race 6 of 6	3.5	
2008	Audi Sport Team Joest (DEU)	Audi R10 TDI	M	0	0	4	35	Race 5 of 5	3	
2009	AMR Eastern Europe (CZE)	Lola-Aston Martin B09/60	M	0	2	5	39	Race 5 of 5	13	
2010	Team Oreca Matmut (FRA)	Peugeot 908 HDi FAP	M	0	2	3	63	Race 5 of 5	8	
2011	Rebellion Racing (CHE)	Lola B10/60-Toyota	M	2	0	3	51	Race 5 of 5	1	

==== LMGTS ====
Winner of the LMGTS ELMS Teams' Championship
Season	Team	Cars	Tyre	Poles	Wins	Podiums	Points	Clinched	Margin	Ref
2004	Larbre Compétition (FRA)	Ferrari 550-GTS Maranello	M	1	4	4	35	Race 4 of 4	14.5	

==== LMGT ====
Winner of the LMGT ELMS Teams' Championship
Season	Team	Cars	Tyre	Poles	Wins	Podiums	Points	Clinched	Margin	Ref
2004	Sebah Automotive Ltd. (GBR)	Porsche 911 GT3-R	D	0	0	4	26	Race 4 of 4	1	

==== LMGT1 ====
Winners of the LMGT1 ELMS Teams' Championship
Season	Team	Cars	Tyre	Poles	Wins	Podiums	Points	Clinched	Margin	Ref
2005	BMS Scuderia Italia (ITA)	Ferrari 550-GTS Maranello	P	1	2	4	35	Race 5 of 5	0	
2006	Aston Martin Racing Larbre (FRA)	Aston Martin DBR9	M	2	2	3	32	Race 5 of 5	4	
2007	Team Oreca (FRA)	Saleen S7-R-Ford	M	4	4	4	40	Race 6 of 6	3	
2008	Luc Alphand Aventures (FRA)	Chevrolet Corvette C6.R	M	0	2	5	42	Race 5 of 5	6	
2009	Luc Alphand Aventures (FRA)	Chevrolet Corvette C6.R	D	1	2	5	44	Race 5 of 5	10	
2010	Larbre Compétition (FRA)	Saleen S7-R-Ford	M	2	4	4	97	Race 3 of 5	72	

==== LMGT2 ====
Winners of the LMGT2 ELMS Teams' Championship
Season	Team	Cars	Tyre	Poles	Wins	Podiums	Points	Clinched	Margin	Ref
2005	Sebah Automotive (GBR)	Porsche 911 GT3-R	D	0	3	3	30	Race 4 of 5	2	
2006	Autorlando Sport (ITA)	Porsche 911 GT3-RSR	P	1	1	3	34	Race 4 of 5	13	
2007	Virgo Motorsport (GBR)	Ferrari F430GT	D	2	2	6	42	Race 6 of 6	3	
2008	Virgo Motorsport (GBR)	Ferrari F430 GT2	D	1	4	4	40	Race 5 of 5	5	
2009	Team Felbermayr-Proton (DEU)	Porsche 997 GT3-RSR	D	3	3	3	36	Race 5 of 5	1	
2010	Team Felbermayr-Proton (DEU)	Porsche 997 GT3-RSR	M	0	3	4	87	Race 4 of 5	21	

==== FLM ====
Winners of the FLM ELMS Teams' Championship
Season	Team	Cars	Tyre	Poles	Wins	Podiums	Points	Clinched	Margin	Ref
2010	DAMS (FRA)	Oreca FLM09-GM	M	0	1	3	59	Race 5 of 5	2	
2011	Pegasus Racing (FRA)	Oreca FLM09-GM	M	0	4	5	73	Race 4 of 5	28	

==== LMGTE Pro ====
Winners of the LMGTE Pro ELMS Teams' Championship
Season	Team	Cars	Tyre	Poles	Wins	Podiums	Points	Clinched	Margin	Ref
2011	AF Corse (ITA)	Ferrari 458 Italia GT2	M	1	2	4	61	Race 4 of 5	15	
2012	JMW Motorsport (GBR)	Ferrari 458 Italia GT2	D	1	2	2	51	Race 2 of 3	32	

==== LMGTE Am ====
Winners of the LMGTE Am ELMS Teams' Championship
Season	Team	Cars	Tyre	Poles	Wins	Podiums	Points	Clinched	Margin	Ref
2011	IMSA Performance Matmut (FRA)	Porsche 997 GT3-RSR	M	4	4	4	75	Race 5 of 5	27	
2012	IMSA Performance Matmut (FRA)	Porsche 997 GT3-RSR	M	0	2	3	94	Race 3 of 3	60	

==== LMPC ====
Winners of the LMPC ELMS Teams' Championship
Season	Team	Cars	Tyre	Poles	Wins	Podiums	Points	Clinched	Margin	Ref
2012	Boutsen Ginion Racing (BEL)	Oreca FLM09-Chevrolet	M	0	2	2	27	Race 2 of 3	2	
2013	Team Endurance Challenge (FRA)	Oreca FLM09-Chevrolet	M	4	3	5	115	Race 5 of 5	17	

==== GTC ====
Winners of the GTC ELMS Teams' Championship
Season	Team	Cars	Tyre	Poles	Wins	Podiums	Points	Clinched	Margin	Ref
2013	SMP Racing (RUS)	Ferrari 458 Italia GT3	M	0	4	4	100	Race 5 of 5	24	
2014	SMP Racing (RUS)	Ferrari 458 Italia GT3	M	0	1	5	94	Race 5 of 5	15.5	
2015	TDS Racing (FRA)	BMW Z4 GT3	D	3	2	4	101	Race 5 of 5	20	

==== LMGTE ====
Winners of the LMGTE ELMS Teams' Championship
Season	Team	Cars	Tyre	Poles	Wins	Podiums	Points	Clinched	Margin	Ref(s)
2013	Ram Racing (GBR)	Ferrari 458 Italia GT2	M	3	3	5	114	Race 4 of 5	34	
2014	SMP Racing (RUS)	Ferrari F458 Italia	M	3	2	3	85	Race 5 of 5	3.5	
2015	Formula Racing (DNK)	Ferrari F458 Italia	D	0	2	3	83	Race 5 of 5	4	
2016	Aston Martin Racing (GBR)	Aston Martin Vantage GTE	D	1	2	3	98	Race 6 of 6	5	
2017	JMW Motorsport (GBR)	Ferrari F458 Italia	D	0	1	5	104	Race 6 of 6	2	
2017	JMW Motorsport (GBR)	Ferrari 488 GTE	D	0	1	5	104	Race 6 of 6	2	
2018	Proton Competition (DEU)	Porsche 911 RSR	D	2	1	5	95.5	Race 6 of 6	7.5	
2019	Luzich Racing (USA)	Ferrari 488 GTE	D	0	4	5	127	Race 5 of 6	51	
2020	Proton Competition (DEU)	Porsche 911 RSR	G	1	2	4	99	Race 6 of 6	0	
2021	Iron Lynx (ITA)	Ferrari 488 GTE Evo	G	0	3	6	126	Race 6 of 6	37	
2022	Proton Competition (DEU)	Porsche 911 RSR-19	G	1	1	3	82	Race 6 of 6	4	
2023	Proton Competition (DEU)	Porsche 911 RSR-19	G	2	2	5	105	Race 6 of 6	20	

== Constructors' Champions ==
In 2008, the Constructors' Championship was awarded solely to the chassis manufacturer in the LMP categories. From 2009 onward, the chassis and engine of each entry were combined in the championship. In the LMGTE categories established in 2011, the results of Pro and Am were combined to award a single LMGTE Constructors' Championship.

Winners of the ELMS Constructors' Champions
Season	Category				Ref(s)
Season	LMP1	LMP2	LMGT1	LMGT2	Ref(s)
2008	Audi (DEU)	Porsche (DEU)	Chevrolet (USA)	Ferrari (ITA)	
2009	Lola-Aston Martin (GBR)	Lola-Judd (GBR)	Chevrolet (USA)	Ferrari (ITA)	
2010	Peugeot (FRA)	Pescarolo-Judd (FRA)	Saleen (USA)	Porsche (DEU)	
2011	LMP1	LMP2	LMGTE		
2011	Lola-Toyota (GBR)	Oreca-Nissan (FRA)	Ferrari (ITA)		
2012	LMP2		LMGTE		
2012	Oreca-Nissan (FRA)		Porsche (DEU)		

== Michelin Green X Challenge ==
The Michelin Green X Challenge was a championship based on the energy efficiency of each entry over the course of the season. The 2007 season had champions in each of the four categories, while from 2008 onward only a single overall champion was declared.

Winners of the Michelin Green X Challenge
Season	Category				Ref(s)
Season	LMP1	LMP2	LMGT1	LMGT2	Ref(s)
2007	Pescarolo Sport (FRA)	Quifel ASM Team (PRT)	Larbre Compétition (FRA)	Thierry Perrier (FRA)	
2008	Overall				
2008	Horag Racing (CHE)				
2009	Speedy Racing Team Sebah (CHE)				
2010	OAK Racing (FRA)				
2011	Pescarolo Team (FRA)				
