= 4 Hours of Portimão =

Le Mans Series
- Venue: Autódromo Internacional do Algarve
- First race: 2009
- First LMS race: 2009
- Duration: 4 hours
- Most wins (driver): (United Kingdom) Philip Hanson (4)
- Most wins (team): (United States) United Autosports (4)
- Most wins (manufacturer): (France) Oreca (8)

The 4 Hours of Portimão (also known as 4 Hours of Algarve) is an endurance race for sports cars, held at Autódromo Internacional do Algarve, in Portugal. The first races were held in 2009 and 2010 as 1000 Kilometres of Algarve, as part of Le Mans Series calendar. Since 2017, it is run in 4 hours format, as part of the European Le Mans Series.

== History ==
The 1000 Kilometres of Algarve was run for the first time in 2009, and was the third round of the Le Mans Series. The race was won by Pescarolo Sport, whilst Quifel ASM Team won the LMP2 category, Alphand Aventures won the GT1 category, and JMW Motorsport won the GT2 category. The race was held again in 2010, and again was the third round of the Le Mans Series. This time, Team Oreca Matmut took the overall victory, whilst RML won the LMP2 category, DAMS won the Formula Le Mans category, AF Corse won the GT2 category, and Larbre Competition won the GT1 category. For 2011, the Portuguese round of the Le Mans Series used the Autódromo do Estoril instead.

In 2017 Portimão took the place of Estoril in the European Le Mans series calendar, in a 4 hour race.

In 2023 with the cancelation of the 4 Hours of Imola for the European Le Mans Series, the Portimão round became a double-header to fill the void, with the race being named 4 Hours of Algarve and 4 Hours of Portimão. The race will be held as part of the Asian Le Mans Series calendar for the first time in 2027, as a consequence of calendar changes due to the Iran war.

== Results ==
Year	Drivers	Team	Car	Time	Distance	Championship
2009	(France) Jean-Christophe Boullion (France) Christophe Tinseau	(France) Pescarolo Sport	Pescarolo 01 Evo	5:49:04.176	1000 km	Le Mans Series
2010	(France) Olivier Panis (France) Stéphane Sarrazin (France) Nicolas Lapierre	(France) Team Oreca Matmut	Peugeot 908 HDi FAP (Diesel)	5:48:30.820	1000 km	Le Mans Series
2011–2016: not held
Year	Drivers	Team	Car	Laps (Distance)	Duration	Championship
2017	(Australia) James Allen (United Kingdom) Richard Bradley (Colombia) Gustavo Yacamán	(France) Graff	Oreca 07	139 laps (646.64 km)	4 hours	European Le Mans Series
2018	(Portugal) Filipe Albuquerque (United Kingdom) Philip Hanson	(United States) United Autosports	Ligier JS P217	140 laps (651.69 km)	4 hours	European Le Mans Series
2019	(France) Paul-Loup Chatin (France) Paul Lafargue (Mexico) Memo Rojas	(France) IDEC Sport	Oreca 07	106 laps (492.95 km)	4 hours	European Le Mans Series
2020	(Russia) Roman Rusinov (Denmark) Mikkel Jensen (Netherlands) Nyck de Vries	(Russia) G-Drive Racing	Aurus 01	147 laps (683.72 km)	4 hours	European Le Mans Series
2021	(South Africa) Jonathan Aberdein (United Kingdom) Tom Gamble (United Kingdom) Philip Hanson	(United Kingdom) United Autosports	Oreca 07	130 laps (604.89 km)	4 hours	European Le Mans Series
2022	(Switzerland) Louis Delétraz (Austria) Ferdinand Habsburg (United States) Juan Manuel Correa	(Italy) Prema Racing	Oreca 07	126 laps (586.28 km)	4 hours	European Le Mans Series
2023 (4 Hours of Algarve)	(Japan) Marino Sato (United Kingdom) Philip Hanson (United Kingdom) Oliver Jarvis	(United States) United Autosports	Oreca 07	120 laps (558.00 km)	4 hours	European Le Mans Series
2023 (4 Hours of Portimão)	(Japan) Marino Sato (United Kingdom) Philip Hanson (United Kingdom) Oliver Jarvis	(United States) United Autosports	Oreca 07	97 laps (442.32 km)	4 hours	European Le Mans Series
2024	(Spain) Lorenzo Fluxá (Denmark) Malthe Jakobsen (Japan) Ritomo Miyata	(Switzerland) COOL Racing	Oreca 07	127 laps (590.93 km)	4 hours	European Le Mans Series
2025	(United Kingdom) Oliver Gray (France) Esteban Masson (France) Charles Milesi	(France) VDS Panis Racing	Oreca 07	135 laps (628.16 km)	4 hours	European Le Mans Series

=== Records ===
==== Wins by constructor ====
Rank	Constructor	Wins	Years
1	(France) Oreca	8	2017–2025
2	(France) Pescarolo	1	2009
2	(France) Peugeot	1	2010
2	(France) Ligier	1	2018
2	(Russia) Aurus	1	2020

==== Wins by engine manufacturer ====
Rank	Constructor	Wins	Years
1	(United Kingdom) Gibson	10	2017–2025
2	(United Kingdom) Judd	1	2009
2	(France) Peugeot	1	2010

==== Drivers with multiple wins ====
Rank	Driver	Wins	Years
1	(United Kingdom) Phil Hanson	4	2018, 2021, 2023 (Algarve)–2023 (Portimão)
2	(Japan) Marino Sato	2	2023 (Algarve)–2023 (Portimão)
2	(United Kingdom) Oliver Jarvis	2	2023 (Algarve)–2023 (Portimão)
