= 2009 Euroseries 3000 =

Seasons
- ← 2008 2010 →

The 2009 Euroseries 3000 began on 16 May at the Autódromo Internacional do Algarve in Portugal and finished at Monza in Italy on 18 October after 14 races.

In February, 2009, series organisers Coloni Motorsport announced that the first-generation A1 Grand Prix chassis, the Lola B05/52, would be introduced into the championship to replace the previous Lola B02/50 model. It was also announced that online gambling site PartyPoker.com became the title sponsor of the series for the next three years.

As a result of the sponsorship deal, the winner of the drivers' championship won a free season in the GP2 Series for 2010. It also allowed them to participate in the 2009–10 GP2 Asia Series and their official testing sessions on 23 and 24 October, less than a week after winning this title. Will Bratt claimed that honour, after his second place in the final race broke a tie with Marco Bonanomi as both drivers finished level on points and victories.

== Teams and drivers ==
Team	No.	Driver	Rounds
(Italy) Team Lazarus	1	(Romania) Michael Herck	1
(Italy) Team Lazarus	1	(Italy) Michael Dalle Stelle	2–3
(Italy) Team Lazarus	2	(Brazil) Diego Nunes	1
(Italy) TP Formula	3	(Monaco) Clivio Piccione	1
(Italy) TP Formula	3	(New Zealand) Earl Bamber	2
(Italy) TP Formula	3	(Italy) Fabrizio Crestani	5
(Italy) TP Formula	4	(Italy) Fabrizio Crestani	1–3
(Italy) FMS International (Italy) Coloni Motorsport†	5	(Venezuela) Rodolfo González	All
(Italy) FMS International (Italy) Coloni Motorsport†	6	(Italy) Fabio Onidi	All
(Italy) FMS International (Italy) Coloni Motorsport†	7	(Spain) Roldán Rodríguez	1
(Italy) FMS International (Italy) Coloni Motorsport†	7	(United Kingdom) Ben Hanley	2
(Italy) FMS International (Italy) Coloni Motorsport†	7	(Italy) Marco Bonanomi	3–6
(Italy) Bull Racing	8	(Italy) Marco Bonanomi	1–2
(Italy) Bull Racing	9	(Mexico) Juan Carlos Sistos	1–2
(Spain) EmiliodeVillota.com Motorsport	10	(United Kingdom) Will Bratt	All
(Spain) EmiliodeVillota.com Motorsport	11	(Italy) Fabrizio Crestani	4
(United Kingdom) Teamcraft Motorsport; Team Costa Rica‡	12	(Venezuela) Pastor Maldonado	1
(United Kingdom) Teamcraft Motorsport; Team Costa Rica‡	12	(Mexico) Juan Carlos Sistos	3–6
(United Kingdom) Teamcraft Motorsport; Team Costa Rica‡	14	(Italy) Raffaele Giammaria	1
(United Kingdom) Teamcraft Motorsport; Team Costa Rica‡	14	(United Kingdom) Ben Hanley	3, 5
(United Kingdom) Teamcraft Motorsport; Team Costa Rica‡	14	(Italy) Matteo Cozzari	6
(Italy) Emmebi Motorsport	15	(Italy) Francesco Dracone	2–6
(Italy) Emmebi Motorsport	16	(Italy) Edoardo Piscopo	4
(Italy) Emmebi Motorsport	16	(Italy) Fabrizio Crestani	6
(Italy) Durango	16	(Italy) Marcello Puglisi	2–3

† FMS International became Coloni Motorsport prior to round three in Zolder.
‡ Teamcraft Motorsport were taken over in the series by Team Costa Rica prior to round three in Zolder.

== Race calendar ==
Rounds denoted with a blue background are a part of the Italian Formula 3000 Championship.

Round		Circuit	Date	Pole position	Fastest lap	Winning driver	Winning team
1	R1	(Portugal) Autódromo Internacional do Algarve	17 May	(Italy) Marco Bonanomi	(Monaco) Clivio Piccione	(Venezuela) Pastor Maldonado	(United Kingdom) Teamcraft Motorsport
1	R2	(Portugal) Autódromo Internacional do Algarve	17 May		(Monaco) Clivio Piccione	(Italy) Fabio Onidi	(Italy) FMS International
2	R1	(France) Circuit de Nevers Magny-Cours	28 June	(Italy) Fabrizio Crestani	(Italy) Fabrizio Crestani	(Italy) Marco Bonanomi	(Italy) Bull Racing
2	R2	(France) Circuit de Nevers Magny-Cours	28 June		(Italy) Fabio Onidi	(United Kingdom) Ben Hanley	(Italy) FMS International
	R1	(United Kingdom) Donington Park	2 August	Races canceled			
	R2	(United Kingdom) Donington Park	2 August	Races canceled			
3	R1	(Belgium) Circuit Zolder	22 August	(Italy) Marco Bonanomi	(Venezuela) Rodolfo González	(Venezuela) Rodolfo González	(Italy) Coloni Motorsport
3	R2	(Belgium) Circuit Zolder	22 August		(United Kingdom) Will Bratt	(United Kingdom) Will Bratt	(Spain) EmiliodeVillota.com Motorsport
4	R1	(Spain) Circuit de Valencia	12 September	(United Kingdom) Will Bratt	(Italy) Fabio Onidi	(United Kingdom) Will Bratt	(Spain) EmiliodeVillota.com Motorsport
4	R2	(Spain) Circuit de Valencia	13 September	(Italy) Marco Bonanomi	(Italy) Marco Bonanomi	(Italy) Marco Bonanomi	(Italy) Coloni Motorsport
4	R3	(Spain) Circuit de Valencia	13 September		(Italy) Marco Bonanomi	(United Kingdom) Will Bratt	(Spain) EmiliodeVillota.com Motorsport
5	R1	(Italy) ACI Vallelunga Circuit	20 September	(United Kingdom) Will Bratt	(United Kingdom) Will Bratt	(Italy) Marco Bonanomi	(Italy) Coloni Motorsport
5	R2	(Italy) ACI Vallelunga Circuit	20 September		(Italy) Fabrizio Crestani	(Italy) Fabio Onidi	(Italy) Coloni Motorsport
6	R1	(Italy) Autodromo Nazionale Monza	18 October	(Venezuela) Rodolfo González	(United Kingdom) Will Bratt	(United Kingdom) Will Bratt	(Spain) EmiliodeVillota.com Motorsport
6	R2	(Italy) Autodromo Nazionale Monza	18 October		(Italy) Marco Bonanomi	(Italy) Marco Bonanomi	(Italy) Coloni Motorsport

== Championship Standings ==
- Points for both championships were awarded as follows:

Race
Position	1st	2nd	3rd	4th	5th	6th	7th	8th
**Race One**	10	8	6	5	4	3	2	1
**Race Two**	6	5	4	3	2	1		

In addition:

- One point was awarded for Pole position for Race One
- One point was awarded for fastest lap in each race

=== Drivers ===
Pos	Driver	ALG (Portugal)		MAG (France)		DON (United Kingdom)		ZOL (Belgium)		VAL (Spain)			VLL (Italy)		MNZ (Italy)		Points
1	(United Kingdom) Will Bratt	8	2	3	7	C	C	8	**1**	**1**	5	1	**2**	3	1	2	71
2	(Italy) Marco Bonanomi	**2**	9	1	5	C	C	**2**	5	Ret	**1**	5	1	6	3	1	71
3	(Italy) Fabio Onidi	7	1	5	2	C	C	4	2	2	2	3	3	1	Ret	4	64
4	(Italy) Fabrizio Crestani	3	3	**2**	Ret	C	C	5	3	3	3	6	4	5	4	DNS	54
5	(Venezuela) Rodolfo González	Ret	11	10	6	C	C	1	6	5	4	4	8	2	**2**	3	44
6	(United Kingdom) Ben Hanley			6	1	C	C	3	4				5	Ret			22
7	(Italy) Francesco Dracone			Ret	8	C	C	7	7	7	6	Ret	7	7	5	5	15
8	(Mexico) Juan Carlos Sistos	Ret	8	9	Ret	C	C	6	Ret	6	7	7	6	4	NC	Ret	14
9	(Italy) Edoardo Piscopo									4	8	2					11
10	(Venezuela) Pastor Maldonado	1	10														10
11	(New Zealand) Earl Bamber			4	4												8
12	(Monaco) Clivio Piccione	6	4														8
13	(Italy) Marcello Puglisi			7	3	C	C	DNS	DNS								6
14	(Romania) Michael Herck	5	5														6
15	(Brazil) Diego Nunes	4	7														5
16	(Italy) Matteo Cozzari														6	6	4
17	(Spain) Roldán Rodríguez	Ret	6														1
18	(Italy) Michael Dalle Stelle			8	Ret	C	C	DNS	DNS								1
	(Italy) Raffaele Giammaria	DNS	DNS														0
Pos	Driver	ALG (Portugal)		MAG (France)		DON (United Kingdom)		ZOL (Belgium)		VAL (Spain)			VLL (Italy)		MNZ (Italy)		Points

Colour	Result
Gold	Winner
Silver	Second place
Bronze	Third place
Green	Points classification
Blue	Non-points classification
Blue	Non-classified finish (NC)
Purple	Retired, not classified (Ret)
Red	Did not qualify (DNQ)
Red	Did not pre-qualify (DNPQ)
Black	Disqualified (DSQ)
White	Did not start (DNS)
White	Withdrew (WD)
White	Race cancelled (C)
Blank	Did not practice (DNP)
Blank	Did not arrive (DNA)
Blank	Excluded (EX)

**Bold** – Pole
Italics – Fastest Lap

==== F3000 Italian Championship ====
Pos	Driver	VAL (Spain)			VLL (Italy)		MNZ (Italy)		Points
1	(United Kingdom) Will Bratt	**1**	5	1	**2**	3	1	2	51
2	(Italy) Marco Bonanomi	Ret	**1**	5	1	6	3	1	39
3	(Italy) Fabio Onidi	2	2	3	3	1	Ret	4	36
4	(Venezuela) Rodolfo González	5	4	4	8	2	**2**	3	31
5	(Italy) Fabrizio Crestani	3	3	6	4	5	4	DNS	26
6	(Italy) Francesco Dracone	7	6	Ret	7	7	5	5	13
7	(Italy) Edoardo Piscopo	4	8	2					11
8	(Mexico) Juan Carlos Sistos	6	7	7	6	4	NC	Ret	11
9	(United Kingdom) Ben Hanley				5	Ret			4
10	(Italy) Matteo Cozzari						6	6	4
Pos	Driver	VAL (Spain)			VLL (Italy)		MNZ (Italy)		Points

=== Teams ===
Pos	Team	ALG (Portugal)		MAG (France)		DON (United Kingdom)		ZOL (Belgium)		VAL (Spain)			VLL (Italy)		MNZ (Italy)		Points
1	(Italy) FMS International (Italy) Coloni Motorsport	7	1	5	2	C	C	1	2	5	2	4	3	2	**2**	3	150
1	(Italy) FMS International (Italy) Coloni Motorsport	Ret	6	6	1	C	C	**2**	5	2	**1**	3	1	1	3	1	150
2	(Spain) EmiliodeVillota.com Motorsport	8	2	3	7	C	C	8	1	**1**	5	1	**2**	3	1	2	84
2	(Spain) EmiliodeVillota.com Motorsport									3	3	6					84
3	(Italy) TP Formula	6	4	4	4												52
3	(Italy) TP Formula	3	3	**2**	Ret	C	C	5	3				4	5			52
4	(Italy) Emmebi Motorsport			Ret	8	C	C	7	7	7	6	Ret	7	7	5	5	31
4	(Italy) Emmebi Motorsport									4	8	2			4	DNS	31
5	Team Costa Rica							6	Ret	6	7	7	6	4	NC	Ret	31
5	Team Costa Rica							3	4				5	Ret	6	6	31
6	(Italy) Bull Racing	**2**	9	1	5	C	C										21
6	(Italy) Bull Racing	Ret	8	9	Ret	C	C										21
7	(Italy) Team Lazarus	5	5	8	Ret	C	C	DNS	DNS								12
7	(Italy) Team Lazarus	4	7														12
8	(United Kingdom) Teamcraft Motorsport	1	10														10
8	(United Kingdom) Teamcraft Motorsport	DNS	DNS														10
9	(Italy) Durango			7	3	C	C	DNS	DNS								6
Pos	Team	ALG (Portugal)		MAG (France)		DON (United Kingdom)		ZOL (Belgium)		VAL (Spain)			VLL (Italy)		MNZ (Italy)		Points

Colour	Result
Gold	Winner
Silver	Second place
Bronze	Third place
Green	Points classification
Blue	Non-points classification
Blue	Non-classified finish (NC)
Purple	Retired, not classified (Ret)
Red	Did not qualify (DNQ)
Red	Did not pre-qualify (DNPQ)
Black	Disqualified (DSQ)
White	Did not start (DNS)
White	Withdrew (WD)
White	Race cancelled (C)
Blank	Did not practice (DNP)
Blank	Did not arrive (DNA)
Blank	Excluded (EX)

**Bold** – Pole
Italics – Fastest Lap
