= Ben Hanley =

British racing driver (born 1985)

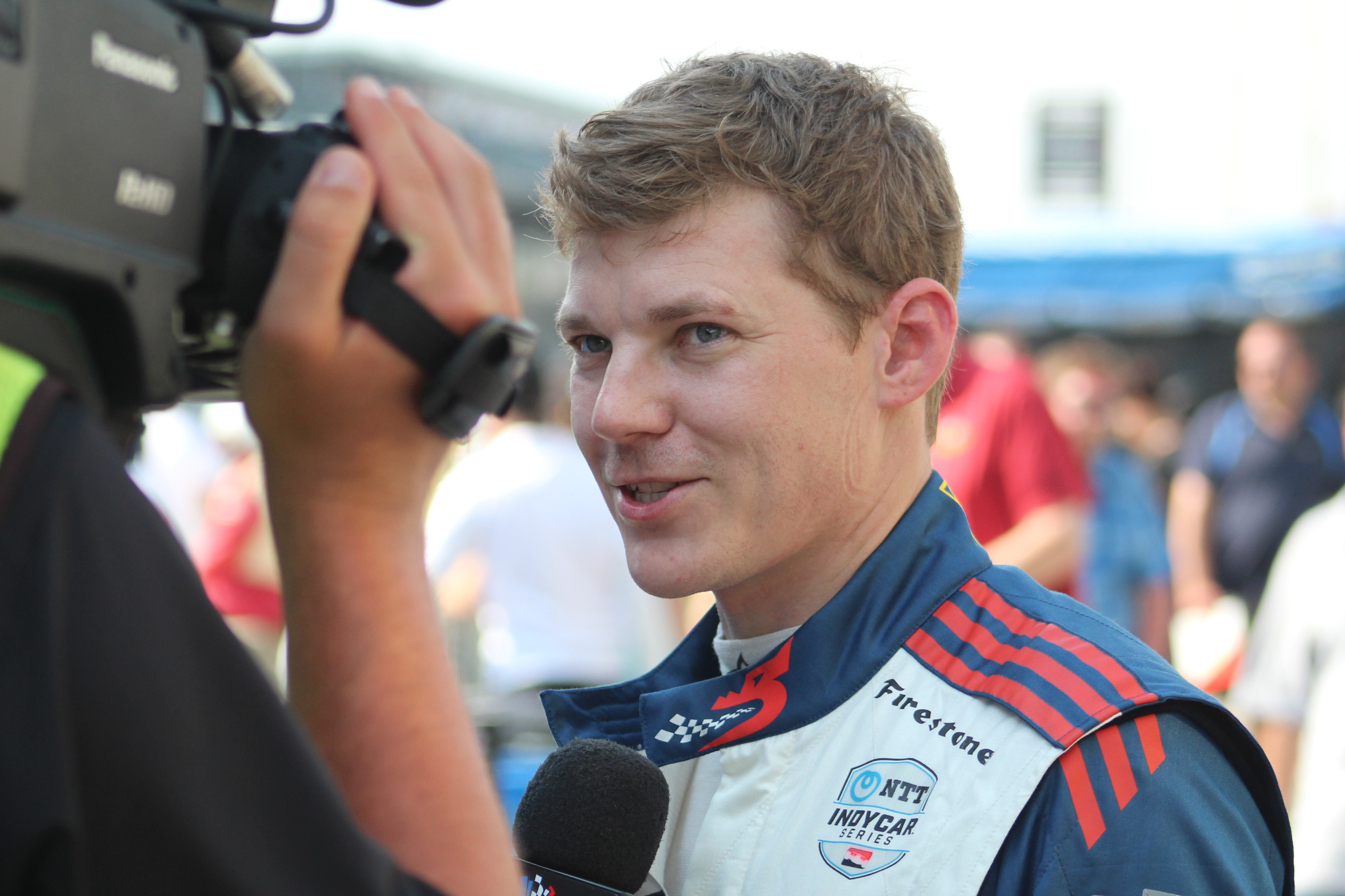
- Hanley at the 2019 Indianapolis 500
- Nationality: British
- Born: Benjamin Michael Hanley; 22 January 1985 (age 41) Manchester, England

FIA World Endurance Championship career
- Debut season: 2017
- Current team: DragonSpeed
- Categorisation: FIA Silver (2016); FIA Gold (2017–)
- Car number: 21
- Former teams: TDS Racing; G-Drive Racing; CEFC Manor TRS Racing; Team LNT
- Starts: 26
- Championships: 0
- Wins: 0
- Poles: 0
- Fastest laps: 0
- Best finish: 11th in 2021

Previous series
- 2005 2006–07 2008 2008: Formula Renault 2.0 Italia; Formula Renault 3.5 Series; GP2 Asia Series; GP2 Series

Championship titles
- 2026 2023 2022: European Le Mans Series - LMP2; IMSA Endurance Cup - LMP2; Asian Le Mans Series - LMP2

Benjamin Michael Hanley (born 22 January 1985) is a British racing driver competing in the European Le Mans Series for United Autosports in LMP2.

A Formula Renault 3.5 Series runner-up and Renault F1 junior in his youth, Hanley entered endurance racing in 2016 after a long hiatus. He has spent 11 seasons in the European Le Mans Series, primarily with DragonSpeed and United Autosports, and won the LMP2 title in 2026. Hanley also drove part-time in the IndyCar Series, and raced in the FIA World Endurance Championship for DragonSpeed and Ginetta in LMP1.

== Career ==
=== Early career ===
Hanley began his motorsport career in karting, where he experienced significant success on the international stage. His transition to single-seaters saw him compete in various junior formulae, including the Formula Renault UK and Eurocup championships. His early speed marked him as a promising talent and caught the attention of the Renault Driver Development Programme, which backed him from 2006 to 2008.

=== Formula Renault 3.5 and GP2 Series ===
Under Renault's guidance, Hanley stepped up to the Formula Renault 3.5 Series, where he quickly established himself as a frontrunner. In the 2007 season, he secured the runner-up position in the overall championship standings, finishing just behind Álvaro Parente.

For the 2008 season, Hanley graduated to the GP2 Series, the primary feeder category to Formula One, driving for the Barwa International Campos Team. However, after the first three rounds of the season (culminating at the Monaco round), he parted ways with the team by mutual consent. Hanley was immediately thrown a lifeline by the Durango team to race at Magny-Cours. Despite showcasing his pace, his GP2 campaign was ultimately hampered by early-season reliability issues and a lack of sustained funding.

In 2010, while competing in Superleague Formula, Hanley served as the official Dallara GP2/11 test driver for Dallara and Pirelli.

=== Return to karting ===
Following his departure from the GP2 Series, Hanley took an extended hiatus from professional car racing. He returned to his roots in karting, where he competed at the highest levels of CIK-FIA events for several years. This five-year break from car racing ultimately worked to his advantage later in his career, permitting him to re-enter professional sportscars under an adjusted FIA driver grading.

=== Endurance racing ===
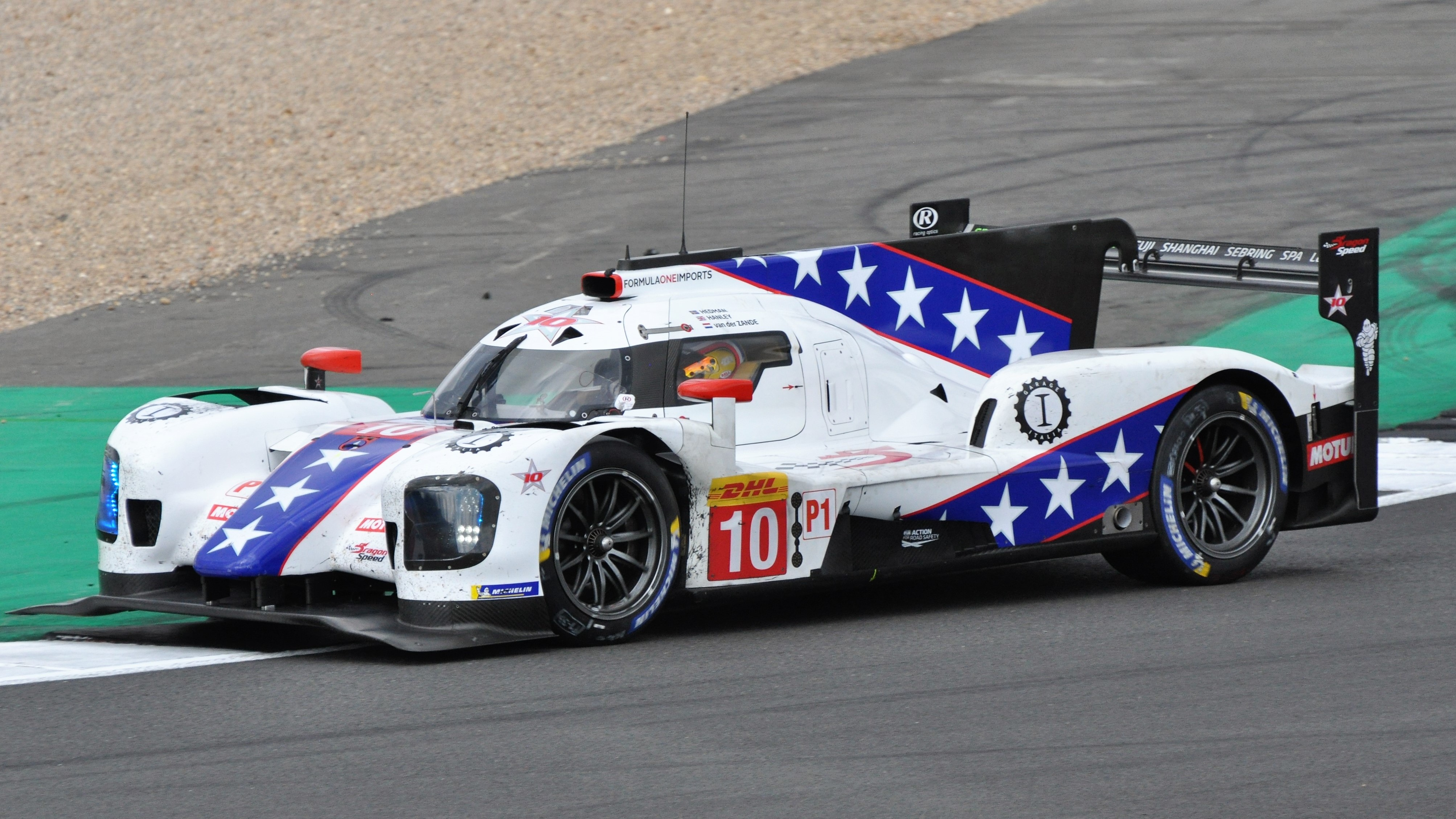
Hanley at the wheel of DragonSpeed's BR Engineering BR1 at the 2018 6 Hours of Silverstone.

In late 2015, Hanley was one of six young drivers invited by Audi Sport to test its Audi RS5 DTM challenger at Circuito de Jerez.

Hanley's career was revitalized when he joined DragonSpeed, led by Elton Julian, to compete in the European Le Mans Series (ELMS) and the FIA World Endurance Championship (WEC). He was instrumental in DragonSpeed's progression up the endurance ladder, taking overall victories in ELMS, including a notable LMP2 win at Spa in 2016 alongside Henrik Hedman and Nicolas Lapierre.

Hanley was also scheduled to make his Formula E debut at the upcoming 2016 Berlin ePrix due to Oliver Turvey's Super GT commitments. However, the Super GT event was postponed because of the Kumamoto earthquakes, and Turvey was reinstated into his NEXTEV TCR seat.

Hanley made his official WEC debut at Spa in 2017 when he was drafted in by the TDS Racing LMP2 squad to replace the injured Matthieu Vaxivière. With DragonSpeed, he later competed in the premier LMP1 class as a privateer entrant and achieved massive success in the LMP2 ranks, notably winning the class at the prestigious 2020 Rolex 24 at Daytona.

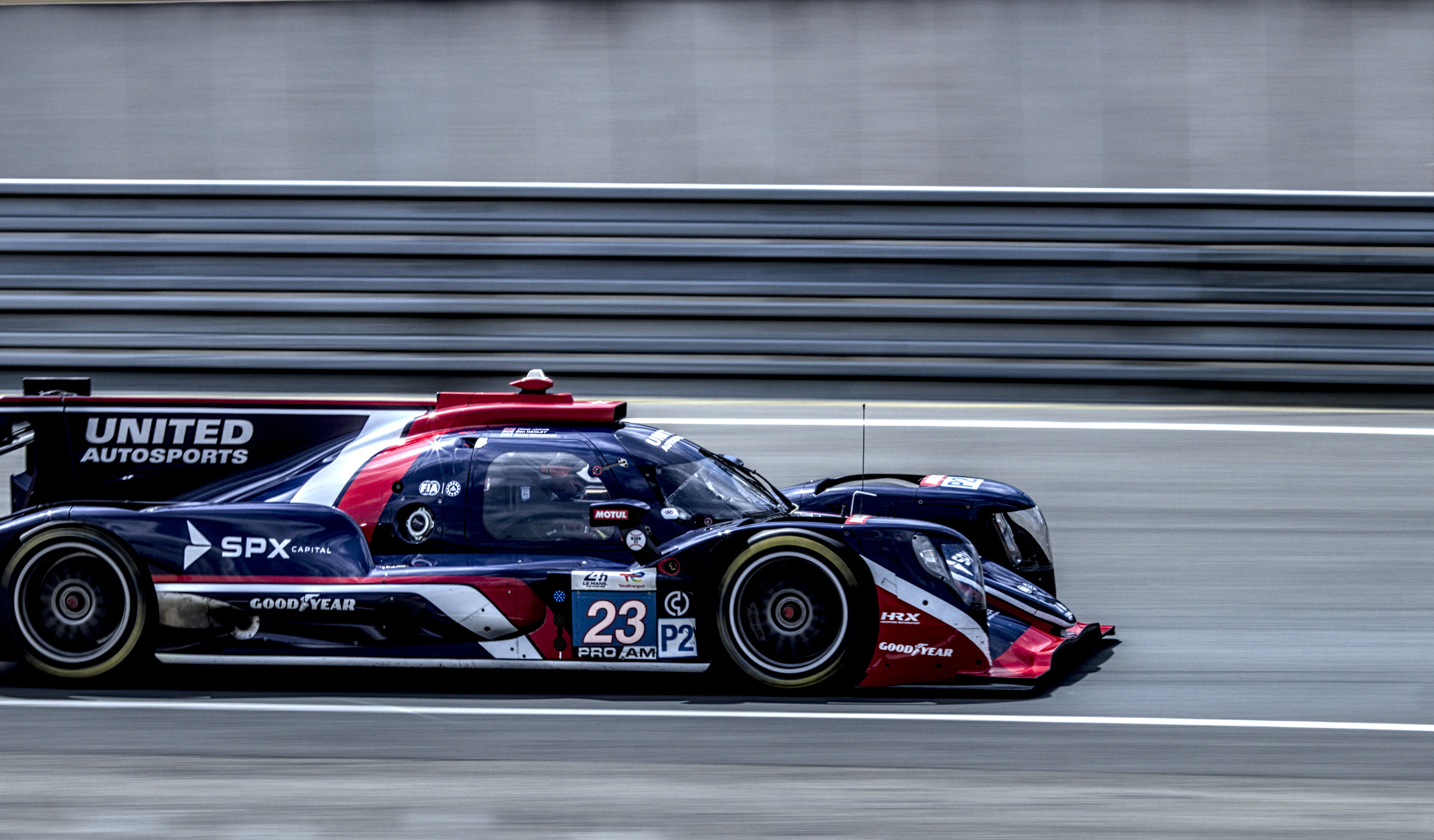
Hanley racing for United Autosports in LMP2 at the 2025 24 Hours of Le Mans.

In recent years, Hanley has continued to be a highly sought-after prototype driver. For the 2023 WEC season, he was signed by United Autosports to substitute for Filipe Albuquerque in select races. United Autosports subsequently confirmed him for a full LMP2 championship tilt in the 2024 IMSA SportsCar Championship alongside Ben Keating.

In 2026, Hanley was confirmed as a development driver for the McLaren MCL-HY, the new top-class prototype developed by McLaren and United for the 2027 FIA World Endurance Championship.

=== IndyCar Series ===
Hanley made his NTT IndyCar Series debut alongside DragonSpeed in 2019. Despite the team being a part-time newcomer with limited testing, Hanley showcased strong performances. He competed in the season-opening Firestone Grand Prix of St. Petersburg, where he advanced to the second round of qualifying, started 12th, and finished 18th. He also raced at the Honda Indy Grand Prix of Alabama.

The highlight of his 2019 IndyCar campaign was successfully qualifying for the 103rd Indianapolis 500. Having never raced on an oval before, Hanley secured the 27th starting position, pushing his Chevrolet-powered Dallara to a 227.482 mph average. He was classified 32nd in the race following a mechanical failure. Hanley returned for the 2020 Indianapolis 500, again partnering with DragonSpeed.

== Racing record ==
=== Career summary ===
Season	Series	Team	Races	Wins	Poles	F/Laps	Podiums	Points	Position
2005	Formula Renault 2.0 Italia	Cram Competition	17	6	2	9	4	264	**3rd**
2005	Eurocup Formula Renault 2.0	Cram Competition	2	0	0	0	1	0	NC†
2005	Formula Renault 3.5 Series	Cram Competition	2	0	0	0	0	0	39th
2005	Formula Renault UK	Team AKA	2	0	0	0	0	21	28th
2006	Formula Renault 3.5 Series	Cram Competition	17	1	0	3	2	55	8th
2007	Formula Renault 3.5 Series	Prema Powerteam	17	2	0	3	6	102	**2nd**
2008	GP2 Asia Series	Barwa International Campos Team	6	0	0	0	1	6	15th
2008	GP2 Series	Barwa International Campos Team	6	0	0	0	0	1	24th
2008	GP2 Series	Durango	2	0	0	0	0	0	24th
2009	Euroseries 3000	Fisichella Motor Sport	6	1	0	1	2	23	6th
2010	Superleague Formula	Olympiacos CFP	10	1	1	3	3	653	4th
2016	European Le Mans Series - LMP2	DragonSpeed	6	1	0	0	4	76	4th
2017	FIA World Endurance Championship – LMP2	TDS Racing	1	0	0	0	0	53	17th
2017	FIA World Endurance Championship – LMP2	G-Drive Racing	1	0	0	0	0	53	17th
2017	FIA World Endurance Championship – LMP2	CEFC Manor TRS Racing	5	0	0	0	1	53	17th
2017	European Le Mans Series - LMP2	DragonSpeed	6	0	2	2	1	40	11th
2017	IMSA SportsCar Championship - Prototype	DragonSpeed	1	0	0	0	0	21	39th
2017	24 Hours of Le Mans – LMP2	DragonSpeed - 10 Star	1	0	0	0	0	N/A	12th
2018	European Le Mans Series - LMP2	DragonSpeed	6	0	1	1	2	50.5	7th
2018	24 Hours of Le Mans	DragonSpeed	1	0	0	0	0	N/A	DNF
2018–19	FIA World Endurance Championship	DragonSpeed	6	0	0	0	0	8.5	28th
2019	European Le Mans Series - LMP2	DragonSpeed	5	1	1	0	1	47	8th
2019	IndyCar Series	DragonSpeed	3	0	0	0	0	31	30th
2019	IMSA SportsCar Championship - LMP2	DragonSpeed	1	0	1	1	1	30	13th
2019	24 Hours of Le Mans	DragonSpeed	1	0	0	0	0	N/A	DNF
2019–20	FIA World Endurance Championship	Team LNT	4	0	0	0	1	27.5	15th
2019–20	FIA World Endurance Championship - LMP2	DragonSpeed	2	0	0	0	0	0	NC†
2020	European Le Mans Series - LMP2	DragonSpeed with Racing Engineering	1	0	0	0	0	5.5	23rd
2020	European Le Mans Series - LMP2	DragonSpeed	3	0	0	0	0	5.5	23rd
2020	IndyCar Series	DragonSpeed	1	0	0	0	0	14	33rd
2020	IMSA SportsCar Championship - LMP2	DragonSpeed USA	2	2	0	0	2	35	13th
2021	FIA World Endurance Championship - LMP2	DragonSpeed USA	6	0	0	0	0	42.5	11th
2021	European Le Mans Series - LMP2	DragonSpeed USA	3	0	0	0	0	1	33rd
2021	IMSA SportsCar Championship - LMP2	DragonSpeed USA	1	0	0	0	0	0	NC‡
2021	24 Hours of Le Mans - LMP2	DragonSpeed USA	1	0	0	0	0	N/A	10th
2022	Asian Le Mans Series - LMP2	Nielsen Racing	4	2	2	0	4	104	**1st**
2022	European Le Mans Series - LMP2	Nielsen Racing	6	0	0	0	0	15	16th
2022	24 Hours of Le Mans - LMP2	Nielsen Racing	1	0	0	0	0	N/A	16th
2023	IMSA SportsCar Championship - LMP2	CrowdStrike Racing by APR	7	2	2	1	5	1958	**2nd**
2023	Asian Le Mans Series - LMP2	Nielsen Racing	4	0	0	0	1	39	6th
2023	European Le Mans Series - LMP2 Pro-Am	Nielsen Racing	6	0	0	0	3	75	4th
2023	24 Hours of Le Mans - LMP2	Nielsen Racing	1	0	0	0	0	N/A	DNF
2023	FIA World Endurance Championship - LMP2	United Autosports	3	0	0	0	1	38	13th
2024	European Le Mans Series - LMP2	United Autosports	6	0	1	0	1	29	10th
2024	IMSA SportsCar Championship - LMP2	United Autosports USA	7	1	2	1	1	1962	5th
2024	24 Hours of Le Mans – LMP2 Pro-Am	United Autosports USA	1	0	0	0	0	N/A	6th
2025	IMSA SportsCar Championship - LMP2	United Autosports USA	7	0	1	0	0	1899	6th
2025	European Le Mans Series - LMP2	United Autosports	6	0	0	0	0	15	14th
2025	24 Hours of Le Mans – LMP2 Pro-Am	United Autosports	1	0	0	0	0	N/A	6th
2025–26	Asian Le Mans Series - LMP2	United Autosports	6	0	0	0	0	28	10th
2026	IMSA SportsCar Championship - LMP2	United Autosports USA	2	0	0	0	0	521	27th
2026	European Le Mans Series - LMP2	United Autosports	6	2	1	1	5	110	**1st**
2026	24 Hours of Le Mans – LMP2 Pro-Am	United Autosports	1	0	0	0	0	N/A	7th

^{†} As Hanley was a guest driver, he was ineligible to score points. ^{‡} Points only counted towards the Michelin Endurance Cup, and not the overall LMP2 Championship. ^{*} Season still in progress.

=== Complete Formula Renault 2.0 Italia results ===
(key) (Races in bold indicate pole position; races in italics indicate fastest lap)

Year	Entrant	1	2	3	4	5	6	7	8	9	10	11	12	13	14	15	16	17	DC	Points
2005	Cram Competition	VLL; 1; 8	VLL; 2; 19	IMO; 1; 11	IMO; 2; 5	SPA; 1; 4	SPA; 2 Ret	MNZ1; 1; 11	MNZ1; 2; 1	MNZ1; 3; 2	MUG; 1; 1	MUG; 2; 1	MIS; 1; 22	MIS; 2; 1	MIS; 3; 1	VAR; 2	MNZ2; 1; 2	MNZ2; 2; 1	3rd	208

=== Complete Formula Renault 2.0 UK Championship results ===
(key) (Races in bold indicate pole position; races in italics indicate fastest lap)

Year	Entrant	1	2	3	4	5	6	7	8	9	10	11	12	13	14	15	16	17	18	19	20	DC	Points
2005	Team AKA	DON; 1	DON; 2	THR; 1	THR; 2	BRH; 1	BRH; 2	OUL; 1	OUL; 2	CRO; 1; 11	CRO; 2; 10	SNE; 1	SNE; 2	KNO; 1	KNO; 2	DON; 1	DON; 2	SIL; 1	SIL; 2	BRH; 1	BRH; 2	28th	21

=== Complete Eurocup Formula Renault 2.0 results ===
(key) (Races in bold indicate pole position; races in italics indicate fastest lap)

Year	Entrant	1	2	3	4	5	6	7	8	9	10	11	12	13	14	15	16	DC	Points
2005	Cram Competition	ZOL; 1	ZOL; 2	VAL; 1	VAL; 2	LMS; 1	LMS; 2	BIL; 1	BIL; 2	OSC; 1	OSC; 2	DON; 1; 3	DON; 2; 10	EST; 1	EST; 2	MNZ; 1	MNZ; 2	NC†	0

† As Hanley was a guest driver, he was ineligible for points

=== Complete Formula Renault 3.5 Series results ===
(key) (Races in bold indicate pole position; results in italics indicate fastest lap)

Year	Entrant	1	2	3	4	5	6	7	8	9	10	11	12	13	14	15	16	17	DC	Points
2005	Cram Competition	ZOL; 1	ZOL; 2	MON; 1	VAL; 1	VAL; 2	LMS; 1	LMS; 2	BIL; 1	BIL; 2	OSC; 1	OSC; 2	DON; 1	DON; 2	EST; 1; 17	EST; 2 Ret	MNZ; 1	MNZ; 2	39th	0
2006	Cram Competition	ZOL; 1; 10	ZOL; 2; 17†	MON; 1 Ret	IST; 1 Ret	IST; 2; 4	MIS; 1; 1	MIS; 2; 2	SPA; 1 Ret	SPA; 2; 7	NÜR; 1; 10	NÜR; 2; 13	DON; 1; 10	DON; 2; 6	LMS; 1; 10	LMS; 2; 20†	CAT; 1; 16	CAT; 2; 7	8th	55
2007	Prema Powerteam	MNZ; 1 Ret	MNZ; 2; 9	NÜR; 1; 2	NÜR; 2; 7	MON; 1; 6	HUN; 1; 3	HUN; 2; 4	SPA; 1; 3	SPA; 2; 2	DON; 1; 16	DON; 2 Ret	MAG; 1; 1	MAG; 2; 14	EST; 1 Ret	EST; 2; 23	CAT; 1; 9	CAT; 2; 1	2nd	102

=== Complete GP2 Series results ===
(key) (Races in bold indicate pole position; results in italics indicate fastest lap)

Year	Entrant	1	2	3	4	5	6	7	8	9	10	11	12	13	14	15	16	17	18	19	20	DC	Pts
2008	Barwa International Campos Team	CAT; FEA; Ret	CAT; SPR; 9	IST; FEA; 17	IST; SPR; 6	MON; FEA; 16	MON; SPR; 14															24th	1
2008	Durango							MAG; FEA; Ret	MAG; SPR; Ret	SIL; FEA	SIL; SPR	HOC; FEA	HOC; SPR	HUN; FEA	HUN; SPR	VAL; FEA	VAL; SPR	SPA; FEA	SPA; SPR	MNZ; FEA	MNZ; SPR	24th	1

==== Complete GP2 Asia Series results ====
(key) (Races in bold indicate pole position; results in italics indicate fastest lap)

Year	Entrant	1	2	3	4	5	6	7	8	9	10	DC	Points
2008	Barwa International Campos Team	DUB1; FEA	DUB1; SPR	SEN; FEA; 3	SEN; SPR; 16	SEP; FEA; Ret	SEP; SPR; 14	BHR; FEA; Ret	BHR; SPR; 10	DUB2; FEA; Ret	DUB2; SPR; Ret	15th	6

=== Complete Euroseries 3000 results ===
(key) (Races in bold indicate pole position; results in italics indicate fastest lap)

Year	Entrant	1	2	3	4	5	6	7	8	9	10	11	12	13	14	DC	Points
2009	FMS International	ALG; 1	ALG; 2	MAG; 1; 6	MAG; 2; 1											6th	22
2009	Team Costa Rica					DON; 1 C	DON; 2 C	ZOL; 1; 3	ZOL; 2; 4	VAL; 1	VAL; 2	VLL; 1; 5	VLL; 2 Ret	MNZ; 1	MNZ; 2	6th	22

=== Complete Superleague Formula results ===
(Races in bold indicate pole position) (Races in italics indicate fastest lap)

Year	Team	1	2	3	4	5	6	7	8	9	10	11	12	13	14	15	16	17	18	19	20	21	22	23	24	Pos	Pts
2010	Olympiacos CFP GU-Racing International	SIL; 1	SIL; 2	ASS; 1	ASS; 2	MAG; 1	MAG; 2	JAR; 1	JAR; 2	NÜR; 1	NÜR; 2	ZOL; 1	ZOL; 2	BRH; 1	BRH; 2	ADR; 1; 3	ADR; 2; 10	POR; 1	POR; 2	**ORD**; **1**; 1	ORD; 2; 4	BEI; 1; 9	BEI; 2; 14	NAV; 1; 12	NAV; 2; 8	4th	653

==== Super Final results ====
(Races in bold indicate pole position) (Races in italics indicate fastest lap)

Year	Team	1	2	3	4	5	6	7	8	9	10	11	12
2010	Olympiacos CFP GU-Racing International	SIL	ASS	MAG	JAR	NÜR	ZOL	BRH	ADR; 3	POR	ORD; 5	BEI; C	NAV; DNQ

=== Complete European Le Mans Series results ===
(key) (Races in bold indicate pole position; results in italics indicate fastest lap)

Year	Entrant	Class	Chassis	Engine	1	2	3	4	5	6	Rank	Points
2016	DragonSpeed	LMP2	Oreca 05	Nissan VK45DE 4.5 L V8	SIL; Ret	IMO; 3	RBR; Ret	LEC; 3	SPA; 1	EST; 2	4th	76
2017	DragonSpeed	LMP2	Oreca 07	Gibson GK428 4.2 L V8	**SIL**; 10	MNZ; 2	RBR; Ret	LEC; 7	**SPA**; 5	ALG; 9	11th	40
2018	DragonSpeed	LMP2	Oreca 07	Gibson GK428 4.2 L V8	LEC; Ret	**MNZ**; 4	RBR; 5	SIL; 2	SPA; 2‡	ALG; 13	7th	50.5
2019	DragonSpeed	LMP2	Oreca 07	Gibson GK428 4.2 L V8	LEC; 1	MNZ	CAT; 10	**SIL**; 4	SPA; 7	ALG; 9	8th	47
2020	DragonSpeed	LMP2	Oreca 07	Gibson GK428 4.2 L V8	LEC; 8	SPA; 14		MNZ; DSQ	ALG		23rd	5.5
2020	DragonSpeed with Racing Engineering	LMP2	Oreca 07	Gibson GK428 4.2 L V8			LEC; 10				23rd	5.5
2021	DragonSpeed USA	LMP2	Oreca 07	Gibson GK428 4.2 L V8	CAT; Ret	RBR; 12	LEC; WD	MNZ; 17	SPA	ALG	33rd	1
2022	Nielsen Racing	LMP2	Oreca 07	Gibson GK428 4.2 L V8	LEC; 13	IMO; 12	MNZ; 6	CAT; 7	SPA; 11	ALG; 10	16th	15
2023	Nielsen Racing	LMP2 Pro-Am	Oreca 07	Gibson GK428 4.2 L V8	CAT; 4	LEC; 4	ARA; 2	SPA; Ret	ALG; 2	ALG; 3	4th	75
2024	United Autosports	LMP2	Oreca 07	Gibson GK428 4.2 L V8	**CAT**; 3	LEC; 5	IMO; 11	SPA; 9	MUG; 11	ALG; 10	10th	29
2025	United Autosports	LMP2	Oreca 07	Gibson GK428 4.2 L V8	CAT; 6	LEC; 9	IMO; 8	SPA; Ret	SIL; 10	ALG; Ret	14th	15
2026	United Autosports	LMP2	Oreca 07	Gibson GK428 4.2 L V8	CAT; 3	LEC; 1	IMO; 2	SPA; 4	SIL; 3	ALG; 1	1st	110

^{‡} Half points awarded as less than 75% of race distance was completed.
^{*} Season still in progress.

=== Complete IMSA SportsCar Championship results ===
(key) (Races in bold indicate pole position; results in italics indicate fastest lap)

Year	Team	Class	Make	Engine	1	2	3	4	5	6	7	8	9	10	Pos.	Points
2017	DragonSpeed	P	Oreca 07	Gibson GK428 4.2 L V8	DAY; 10	SEB	LBH	COA	DET	WGL	MOS	ELK	LGA	PET	39th	21
2019	DragonSpeed	LMP2	Oreca 07	Gibson GK428 4.2 L V8	**DAY**; 3	SEB	MDO	WGL	MOS	ELK	LGA	PET			13th	30
2020	DragonSpeed USA	LMP2	Oreca 07	Gibson GK428 4.2 L V8	DAY; 1†	SEB	ELK; 1	ATL	PET	LGA	SEB				13th	35
2021	DragonSpeed USA	LMP2	Oreca 07	Gibson GK428 4.2 L V8	DAY; 10†	SEB	WGL	WGL	ELK	LGA	PET				NC†	0†
2023	CrowdStrike Racing by APR	LMP2	Oreca 07	Gibson GK428 4.2 L V8	DAY; 2†	SEB; 5	**LGA**; 3	WGL; 1	**ELK**; 7	IMS; 3	PET; 1				2nd	1958
2024	United Autosports USA	LMP2	Oreca 07	Gibson GK428 4.2 L V8	**DAY**; 6	SEB; 10	WGL; 8	MOS; 4	ELK; 1	IMS; 9	**PET**; 10				5th	1962
2025	United Autosports USA	LMP2	Oreca 07	Gibson GK428 4.2 L V8	DAY; 11	SEB; 5	WGL; 10	MOS; 4	ELK; 4	**IMS**; 6	PET; 9				6th	1899
2026	United Autosports USA	LMP2	Oreca 07	Gibson GK428 4.2 L V8	DAY; 10	SEB	WGL	MOS; 5	ELK	IMS	PET				27th	521

^{†} Points only counted towards the Michelin Endurance Cup, and not the overall LMP2 Championship.

=== Complete FIA World Endurance Championship results ===
(key) (Races in bold indicate pole position; results in italics indicate fastest lap)

Year	Entrant	Class	Chassis	Engine	1	2	3	4	5	6	7	8	9	Rank	Points
2017	TDS Racing	LMP2	Oreca 07	Gibson GK428 4.2 L V8	SIL	SPA; 9	LMS							17th	53
2017	G-Drive Racing	LMP2	Oreca 07	Gibson GK428 4.2 L V8				NÜR; 6						17th	53
2017	CEFC Manor TRS Racing	LMP2	Oreca 07	Gibson GK428 4.2 L V8					MEX; 3	COA; 6	FUJ; 5	SHA; 9	BHR; 6	17th	53
2018–19	DragonSpeed	LMP1	BR Engineering BR1	Gibson GL458 4.5 L V8	SPA; DNS	LMS; Ret	SIL; 25	FUJ; Ret	SHA; 6	SEB; Ret	SPA	LMS; Ret		28th	8.5
2019–20	Team LNT	LMP1	Ginetta G60-LT-P1	AER P60C 2.4 L Turbo V6	SIL; 3	FUJ; 11	SHA; 4	BHR; Ret						15th	27.5
2019–20	DragonSpeed	LMP2	Oreca 07	Gibson GK428 4.2 L V8					COA; 9	SPA	LMS; 12	BHR		NC†	0
2021	DragonSpeed USA	LMP2	Oreca 07	Gibson GK428 4.2 L V8	SPA; 7	ALG; 8	MNZ; 6	LMS; 5	BHR; 11	BHR; 10				11th	42.5
2022	Nielsen Racing	LMP2	Oreca 07	Gibson GK428 4.2 L V8	SEB	SPA	LMS; 16	MNZ	FUJ	BHR				NC†	0†
2023	United Autosports	LMP2	Oreca 07	Gibson GK428 4.2 L V8	SEB	ALG; 2	SPA	LMS	MNZ; 6	FUJ; 4	BHR			13th	38

^{†} Not eligible for points.

=== Complete 24 Hours of Le Mans results ===
Year	Team	Co-Drivers	Car	Class	Laps	Pos.	Class Pos.
2017	(United States) DragonSpeed - 10 Star	(Sweden) Henrik Hedman (Sweden) Felix Rosenqvist	Oreca 07-Gibson	LMP2	343	14th	12th
2018	(United States) DragonSpeed	(Sweden) Henrik Hedman (Netherlands) Renger van der Zande	BR Engineering BR1-Gibson	LMP1	244	DNF	DNF
2019	(United States) DragonSpeed	(Sweden) Henrik Hedman (Netherlands) Renger van der Zande	BR Engineering BR1-Gibson	LMP1	76	DNF	DNF
2020	(United States) DragonSpeed USA	(Sweden) Henrik Hedman (Netherlands) Renger van der Zande	Oreca 07-Gibson	LMP2	361	16th	12th
2021	(United States) DragonSpeed USA	(Sweden) Henrik Hedman (Colombia) Juan Pablo Montoya	Oreca 07-Gibson	LMP2	356	15th	10th
2021	(United States) DragonSpeed USA	(Sweden) Henrik Hedman (Colombia) Juan Pablo Montoya	Oreca 07-Gibson	LMP2 Pro-Am	356	15th	**1st**
2022	(United Kingdom) Nielsen Racing	(United Kingdom) Matt Bell (United States) Rodrigo Sales	Oreca 07-Gibson	LMP2	362	20th	16th
2023	(United Kingdom) Nielsen Racing	(Switzerland) Mathias Beche (United States) Rodrigo Sales	Oreca 07-Gibson	LMP2	18	DNF	DNF
2023	(United Kingdom) Nielsen Racing	(Switzerland) Mathias Beche (United States) Rodrigo Sales	Oreca 07-Gibson	LMP2 Pro-Am	18	DNF	DNF
2024	(United States) United Autosports USA	(Portugal) Filipe Albuquerque (United States) Ben Keating	Oreca 07-Gibson	LMP2	272	42nd	13th
2024	(United States) United Autosports USA	(Portugal) Filipe Albuquerque (United States) Ben Keating	Oreca 07-Gibson	LMP2 Pro-Am	272	42nd	6th
2025	(United Kingdom) United Autosports	(United Kingdom) Oliver Jarvis (Brazil) Daniel Schneider	Oreca 07-Gibson	LMP2	363	28th	11th
2025	(United Kingdom) United Autosports	(United Kingdom) Oliver Jarvis (Brazil) Daniel Schneider	Oreca 07-Gibson	LMP2 Pro-Am	363	28th	6th
2026	(United Kingdom) United Autosports	(United Kingdom) Oliver Jarvis (Brazil) Daniel Schneider	Oreca 07-Gibson	LMP2	353	29th	15th
2026	(United Kingdom) United Autosports	(United Kingdom) Oliver Jarvis (Brazil) Daniel Schneider	Oreca 07-Gibson	LMP2 Pro-Am	353	29th	7th

=== American open-wheel racing results ===
(key)

==== IndyCar Series ====
(key)

Year	Team	No.	Chassis	Engine	1	2	3	4	5	6	7	8	9	10	11	12	13	14	15	16	17	Rank	Points	Ref
2019	DragonSpeed	81	Dallara DW12	Chevrolet	STP; 18	COA	ALA; 21	LBH	IMS	INDY; 32	DET	DET	TXS	RDA	TOR	IOW	MDO	POC	GTW	POR	LAG	30th	31	
2020	DragonSpeed	81	Dallara DW12	Chevrolet	TXS	IMS	ROA	ROA	IOW	IOW	INDY; 23	GTW	GTW	MDO	MDO	IMS	IMS	STP				33rd	14	

==== Indianapolis 500 ====
Year	Chassis	Engine	Start	Finish	Team
2019	Dallara	Chevrolet	27	32	DragonSpeed
2020	Dallara	Chevrolet	33	23	DragonSpeed

Sporting positions
Preceded by René Binder; Ferdinand Habsburg; Yifei Ye	Asian Le Mans Series; LMP2 Champion; 2022; With: Matt Bell & Rodrigo Sales	Succeeded by Charlie Eastwood; Ayhancan Güven; Salih Yoluç
Preceded by Mikkel Jensen; Ben Keating; Scott Huffaker	Michelin Endurance Cup; LMP2 Champion; 2023; With: George Kurtz	Succeeded by Mikkel Jensen; Hunter McElrea; Steven Thomas
