= 2019 4 Hours of Portimão =

2019 endurance sportscar race in Portimão, Portugal

Layout of the Algarve International Circuit, where the race was held

The 2019 4 Hours of Portimão was an endurance sportscar racing event held on October 27, 2019, at the Algarve International Circuit. It was the sixth and final round of the 2019 European Le Mans Series.

== Race ==
=== Race results ===
Class winners are in bold and ‡.

| Pos | Class | No | Team | Drivers | Chassis | Tyre | Laps | Time/Retired |
| Pos | Class | No | Team | Drivers | Engine | Tyre | Laps | Time/Retired |
|---|---|---|---|---|---|---|---|---|
| 1 | **LMP2** | **28** | **(France) IDEC Sport** | **(France) Paul-Loup Chatin** **(France) Paul Lafargue** **(Mexico) Memo Rojas** | **Oreca 07** | MI | **106** | **4:00:33.138‡** |
| 1 | **LMP2** | **28** | **(France) IDEC Sport** | **(France) Paul-Loup Chatin** **(France) Paul Lafargue** **(Mexico) Memo Rojas** | **Gibson GK428 4.2 L V8** | MI | **106** | **4:00:33.138‡** |
| 2 | LMP2 | 22 | (United Kingdom) United Autosports | (United Kingdom) Phil Hanson (Portugal) Filipe Albuquerque | Oreca 07 | MI | 106 | +0.496 |
| 2 | LMP2 | 22 | (United Kingdom) United Autosports | (United Kingdom) Phil Hanson (Portugal) Filipe Albuquerque | Gibson GK428 4.2 L V8 | MI | 106 | +0.496 |
| 3 | LMP2 | 39 | (France) Graff | (France) Alexandre Cougnaud (France) Tristan Gommendy (Switzerland) Jonathan Hirschi | Oreca 07 | MI | 106 | +7.986 |
| 3 | LMP2 | 39 | (France) Graff | (France) Alexandre Cougnaud (France) Tristan Gommendy (Switzerland) Jonathan Hirschi | Gibson GK428 4.2 L V8 | MI | 106 | +7.986 |
| 4 | LMP2 | 32 | (United Kingdom) United Autosports | (United Kingdom) Alex Brundle (Republic of Ireland) Ryan Cullen (United States) William Owen | Oreca 07 | MI | 106 | +8.620 |
| 4 | LMP2 | 32 | (United Kingdom) United Autosports | (United Kingdom) Alex Brundle (Republic of Ireland) Ryan Cullen (United States) William Owen | Gibson GK428 4.2 L V8 | MI | 106 | +8.620 |
| 5 | LMP2 | 25 | (Portugal) Algarve Pro Racing | (United States) John Falb (France) Andrea Pizzitola (France) Olivier Pla | Oreca 07 | D | 106 | +41.576 |
| 5 | LMP2 | 25 | (Portugal) Algarve Pro Racing | (United States) John Falb (France) Andrea Pizzitola (France) Olivier Pla | Gibson GK428 4.2 L V8 | D | 106 | +41.576 |
| 6 | LMP2 | 26 | (Russia) G-Drive Racing | (Russia) Roman Rusinov (Netherlands) Job van Uitert (France) Jean-Éric Vergne | Aurus 01 | D | 106 | +45.123 |
| 6 | LMP2 | 26 | (Russia) G-Drive Racing | (Russia) Roman Rusinov (Netherlands) Job van Uitert (France) Jean-Éric Vergne | Gibson GK428 4.2 L V8 | D | 106 | +45.123 |
| 7 | LMP2 | 23 | (France) Panis Barthez Competition | (Austria) René Binder (France) Julien Canal (United Kingdom) Will Stevens | Oreca 07 | D | 106 | +45.433 |
| 7 | LMP2 | 23 | (France) Panis Barthez Competition | (Austria) René Binder (France) Julien Canal (United Kingdom) Will Stevens | Gibson GK428 4.2 L V8 | D | 106 | +45.433 |
| 8 | LMP2 | 24 | (France) Panis Barthez Competition | (France) Timothé Buret (Russia) Konstantin Tereshchenko | Ligier JS P217 | D | 106 | +55.649 |
| 8 | LMP2 | 24 | (France) Panis Barthez Competition | (France) Timothé Buret (Russia) Konstantin Tereshchenko | Gibson GK428 4.2 L V8 | D | 106 | +55.649 |
| 9 | LMP2 | 21 | (United States) DragonSpeed | (Australia) James Allen (Sweden) Henrik Hedman (United Kingdom) Ben Hanley | Oreca 07 | MI | 105 | +1 Lap |
| 9 | LMP2 | 21 | (United States) DragonSpeed | (Australia) James Allen (Sweden) Henrik Hedman (United Kingdom) Ben Hanley | Gibson GK428 4.2 L V8 | MI | 105 | +1 Lap |
| 10 | LMP2 | 35 | (United Kingdom) BHK Motorsport | (Italy) Sergio Campana (Italy) Francesco Dracone (United Kingdom) Garry Findlay | Oreca 07 | D | 105 | +1 Lap |
| 10 | LMP2 | 35 | (United Kingdom) BHK Motorsport | (Italy) Sergio Campana (Italy) Francesco Dracone (United Kingdom) Garry Findlay | Gibson GK428 4.2 L V8 | D | 105 | +1 Lap |
| 11 | LMP2 | 31 | (Portugal) Algarve Pro Racing | (Sweden) Henning Enqvist (United States) James French (South Korea) Tacksung Kim | Oreca 07 | D | 104 | +2 Laps |
| 11 | LMP2 | 31 | (Portugal) Algarve Pro Racing | (Sweden) Henning Enqvist (United States) James French (South Korea) Tacksung Kim | Gibson GK428 4.2 L V8 | D | 104 | +2 Laps |
| 12 | LMP2 | 20 | (Denmark) High Class Racing | (Denmark) Dennis Andersen (Denmark) Anders Fjordbach | Oreca 07 | D | 104 | +2 Laps |
| 12 | LMP2 | 20 | (Denmark) High Class Racing | (Denmark) Dennis Andersen (Denmark) Anders Fjordbach | Gibson GK428 4.2 L V8 | D | 104 | +2 Laps |
| 13 | LMP2 | 27 | (France) IDEC Sport | (France) Stéphane Adler (France) William Cavailhes (France) Patrice Lafargue | Ligier JS P217 | MI | 102 | +4 Laps |
| 13 | LMP2 | 27 | (France) IDEC Sport | (France) Stéphane Adler (France) William Cavailhes (France) Patrice Lafargue | Gibson GK428 4.2 L V8 | MI | 102 | +4 Laps |
| 14 | LMP2 | 37 | (Switzerland) Cool Racing | (Switzerland) Antonin Borga (Switzerland) Alexandre Coigny (France) Nicolas Lapierre | Oreca 07 | MI | 101 | +5 Laps |
| 14 | LMP2 | 37 | (Switzerland) Cool Racing | (Switzerland) Antonin Borga (Switzerland) Alexandre Coigny (France) Nicolas Lapierre | Gibson GK428 4.2 L V8 | MI | 101 | +5 Laps |
| 15 | **LMP3** | **6** | **(United Kingdom) 360 Racing** | **(Canada) James Dayson** **(United Kingdom) Ross Kaiser** **(United Kingdom) Terrence Woodward** | **Ligier JS P3** | MI | **101** | **+5 Laps‡** |
| 15 | **LMP3** | **6** | **(United Kingdom) 360 Racing** | **(Canada) James Dayson** **(United Kingdom) Ross Kaiser** **(United Kingdom) Terrence Woodward** | **Nissan VK50VE 5.0 L V8** | MI | **101** | **+5 Laps‡** |
| 16 | LMP3 | 2 | (United Kingdom) United Autosports | (United Kingdom) Wayne Boyd (Brazil) Tommy Erdos (Canada) Garett Grist | Ligier JS P3 | MI | 101 | +5 Laps |
| 16 | LMP3 | 2 | (United Kingdom) United Autosports | (United Kingdom) Wayne Boyd (Brazil) Tommy Erdos (Canada) Garett Grist | Nissan VK50VE 5.0 L V8 | MI | 101 | +5 Laps |
| 17 | **LMGTE** | **51** | **(United States) Luzich Racing** | **(France) Fabien Lavergne** **(Denmark) Nicklas Nielsen** **(Italy) Alessandro Pier Guidi** | **Ferrari 488 GTE** | D | **100** | **+6 Laps‡** |
| 17 | **LMGTE** | **51** | **(United States) Luzich Racing** | **(France) Fabien Lavergne** **(Denmark) Nicklas Nielsen** **(Italy) Alessandro Pier Guidi** | **Ferrari F154CB 3.9 L Turbo V8** | D | **100** | **+6 Laps‡** |
| 18 | LMP3 | 17 | (France) Ultimate | (France) François Heriau (France) Jean-Baptiste Lahaye (France) Matthieu Lahaye | Norma M30 | MI | 100 | +6 Laps |
| 18 | LMP3 | 17 | (France) Ultimate | (France) François Heriau (France) Jean-Baptiste Lahaye (France) Matthieu Lahaye | Nissan VK50VE 5.0 L V8 | MI | 100 | +6 Laps |
| 19 | LMP3 | 8 | (United Kingdom) Nielsen Racing | (United Kingdom) James Littlejohn (United Kingdom) Nicholas Adcock | Ligier JS P3 | MI | 100 | +6 Laps |
| 19 | LMP3 | 8 | (United Kingdom) Nielsen Racing | (United Kingdom) James Littlejohn (United Kingdom) Nicholas Adcock | Nissan VK50VE 5.0 L V8 | MI | 100 | +6 Laps |
| 20 | LMP3 | 7 | (United Kingdom) Nielsen Racing | (United Kingdom) Colin Noble (United Kingdom) Anthony Wells | Norma M30 | MI | 100 | +6 Laps |
| 20 | LMP3 | 7 | (United Kingdom) Nielsen Racing | (United Kingdom) Colin Noble (United Kingdom) Anthony Wells | Nissan VK50VE 5.0 L V8 | MI | 100 | +6 Laps |
| 21 | LMP3 | 11 | (United States) Eurointernational | (Denmark) Mikkel Jensen (Germany) Jens Petersen | Ligier JS P3 | MI | 100 | +6 Laps |
| 21 | LMP3 | 11 | (United States) Eurointernational | (Denmark) Mikkel Jensen (Germany) Jens Petersen | Nissan VK50VE 5.0 L V8 | MI | 100 | +6 Laps |
| 22 | LMP3 | 14 | (Poland) Inter Europol Competition | (Germany) Paul Scheuschner (Austria) Constantin Schöll | Ligier JS P3 | MI | 100 | +6 Laps |
| 22 | LMP3 | 14 | (Poland) Inter Europol Competition | (Germany) Paul Scheuschner (Austria) Constantin Schöll | Nissan VK50VE 5.0 L V8 | MI | 100 | +6 Laps |
| 23 | LMGTE | 60 | (Switzerland) Kessel Racing | (Italy) Sergio Pianezzola (Italy) Andrea Piccini (South Africa) David Perel | Ferrari 488 GTE | D | 100 | +6 Laps |
| 23 | LMGTE | 60 | (Switzerland) Kessel Racing | (Italy) Sergio Pianezzola (Italy) Andrea Piccini (South Africa) David Perel | Ferrari F154CB 3.9 L Turbo V8 | D | 100 | +6 Laps |
| 24 | LMGTE | 80 | (Italy) EbiMotors | (Italy) Fabio Babini (Italy) Marco Frezza (Italy) Gianluca Giraudi | Porsche 911 RSR | D | 100 | +6 Laps |
| 24 | LMGTE | 80 | (Italy) EbiMotors | (Italy) Fabio Babini (Italy) Marco Frezza (Italy) Gianluca Giraudi | Porsche 4.0 L Flat-6 | D | 100 | +6 Laps |
| 25 | LMGTE | 55 | (Switzerland) Spirit of Race | (United Kingdom) Duncan Cameron (Republic of Ireland) Matt Griffin (United Kingdom) Aaron Scott | Ferrari 488 GTE | D | 100 | +6 Laps |
| 25 | LMGTE | 55 | (Switzerland) Spirit of Race | (United Kingdom) Duncan Cameron (Republic of Ireland) Matt Griffin (United Kingdom) Aaron Scott | Ferrari F154CB 3.9 L Turbo V8 | D | 100 | +6 Laps |
| 26 | LMP3 | 9 | (Switzerland) Realteam Racing | (Switzerland) David Droux (Switzerland) Esteban García | Norma M30 | MI | 99 | +7 Laps |
| 26 | LMP3 | 9 | (Switzerland) Realteam Racing | (Switzerland) David Droux (Switzerland) Esteban García | Nissan VK50VE 5.0 L V8 | MI | 99 | +7 Laps |
| 27 | LMP3 | 19 | (France) M Racing | (Switzerland) Lucas Légeret (France) Laurent Millara | Norma M30 | MI | 98 | +8 Laps |
| 27 | LMP3 | 19 | (France) M Racing | (Switzerland) Lucas Légeret (France) Laurent Millara | Nissan VK50VE 5.0 L V8 | MI | 98 | +8 Laps |
| 28 | LMP3 | 15 | (United Kingdom) RLR MSport | (Denmark) Christian Stubbe Olsen (United Kingdom) Martin Rich (Denmark) Martin Vedel Mortensen | Ligier JS P3 | MI | 95 | +11 Laps |
| 28 | LMP3 | 15 | (United Kingdom) RLR MSport | (Denmark) Christian Stubbe Olsen (United Kingdom) Martin Rich (Denmark) Martin Vedel Mortensen | Nissan VK50VE 5.0 L V8 | MI | 95 | +11 Laps |
| 29 | LMP2 | 43 | (United Kingdom) RLR MSport | (Canada) John Farano (India) Arjun Maini (Brazil) Bruno Senna | Oreca 07 | D | 94 | +12 Laps |
| 29 | LMP2 | 43 | (United Kingdom) RLR MSport | (Canada) John Farano (India) Arjun Maini (Brazil) Bruno Senna | Gibson GK428 4.2 L V8 | D | 94 | +12 Laps |
| 30 | LMP3 | 13 | (Poland) Inter Europol Competition | (Germany) Martin Hippe (United Kingdom) Nigel Moore | Ligier JS P3 | MI | 92 | +14 Laps |
| 30 | LMP3 | 13 | (Poland) Inter Europol Competition | (Germany) Martin Hippe (United Kingdom) Nigel Moore | Nissan VK50VE 5.0 L V8 | MI | 92 | +14 Laps |
| 31 | LMGTE | 66 | (United Kingdom) JMW Motorsport | (Italy) Matteo Cressoni (Canada) Wei Lu (United States) Jeff Segal | Ferrari 488 GTE | D | 92 | +14 Laps |
| 31 | LMGTE | 66 | (United Kingdom) JMW Motorsport | (Italy) Matteo Cressoni (Canada) Wei Lu (United States) Jeff Segal | Ferrari F154CB 3.9 L Turbo V8 | D | 92 | +14 Laps |
| 32 | LMP2 | 30 | (France) Duqueine Engineering | (United Kingdom) Richard Bradley (France) Nico Jamin (France) Pierre Ragues | Oreca 07 | MI | 66 | Did not finish |
| 32 | LMP2 | 30 | (France) Duqueine Engineering | (United Kingdom) Richard Bradley (France) Nico Jamin (France) Pierre Ragues | Gibson GK428 4.2 L V8 | MI | 66 | Did not finish |
| 33 | LMP2 | 34 | (Poland) Inter Europol Competition | (Poland) Jakub Śmiechowski (Switzerland) Mathias Beche (Belgium) Sam Dejonghe | Ligier JS P217 | MI | 29 | Did not finish |
| 33 | LMP2 | 34 | (Poland) Inter Europol Competition | (Poland) Jakub Śmiechowski (Switzerland) Mathias Beche (Belgium) Sam Dejonghe | Gibson GK428 4.2 L V8 | MI | 29 | Did not finish |
| 34 | LMGTE | 83 | (Switzerland) Kessel Racing | (Switzerland) Rahel Frey (Denmark) Michelle Gatting (Italy) Manuela Gostner | Ferrari 488 GTE | D | 1 | Crash damage |
| 34 | LMGTE | 83 | (Switzerland) Kessel Racing | (Switzerland) Rahel Frey (Denmark) Michelle Gatting (Italy) Manuela Gostner | Ferrari F154CB 3.9 L Turbo V8 | D | 1 | Crash damage |
| 35 | LMP2 | 45 | (United Kingdom) Thunderhead Carlin Racing | (United Kingdom) Ben Barnicoat (United Kingdom) Jack Manchester (United Kingdom) Harry Tincknell | Dallara P217 | D | 0 | Crash |
| 35 | LMP2 | 45 | (United Kingdom) Thunderhead Carlin Racing | (United Kingdom) Ben Barnicoat (United Kingdom) Jack Manchester (United Kingdom) Harry Tincknell | Gibson GK428 4.2 L V8 | D | 0 | Crash |
| 36 | LMP3 | 3 | (United Kingdom) United Autosports | (United Kingdom) Christian England (United Kingdom) Andrew Bentley | Ligier JS P3 | MI | 0 | Crash |
| 36 | LMP3 | 3 | (United Kingdom) United Autosports | (United Kingdom) Christian England (United Kingdom) Andrew Bentley | Nissan VK50VE 5.0 L V8 | MI | 0 | Crash |
| 37 | LMP3 | 10 | (Italy) Oregon Team | (Italy) Lorenzo Bontempelli (Italy) Damiano Fioravanti (Lithuania) Gustas Grinbergas | Norma M30 | MI | 0 | Crash |
| 37 | LMP3 | 10 | (Italy) Oregon Team | (Italy) Lorenzo Bontempelli (Italy) Damiano Fioravanti (Lithuania) Gustas Grinbergas | Nissan VK50VE 5.0 L V8 | MI | 0 | Crash |
| 38 | LMGTE | 77 | (Germany) Dempsey-Proton Racing | (Italy) Matteo Cairoli (Italy) Riccardo Pera (Germany) Christian Ried | Porsche 911 RSR | D | 0 | Crash |
| 38 | LMGTE | 77 | (Germany) Dempsey-Proton Racing | (Italy) Matteo Cairoli (Italy) Riccardo Pera (Germany) Christian Ried | Porsche 4.0 L Flat-6 | D | 0 | Crash |
| 39 | LMGTE | 88 | (Germany) Proton Competition | (Austria) Thomas Preining (Belgium) Adrien De Leener (Germany) Steffen Görig | Porsche 911 RSR | D | 0 | Crash |
| 39 | LMGTE | 88 | (Germany) Proton Competition | (Austria) Thomas Preining (Belgium) Adrien De Leener (Germany) Steffen Görig | Porsche 4.0 L Flat-6 | D | 0 | Crash |

European Le Mans Series
| Previous race: Spa-Francorchamps | 2019 season | Next race: none |
