= Teamcraft Motorsport =

(United Kingdom) Teamcraft Motorsport
- Founded: 2007
- Folded: 2009 (last activity)
- Team principal(s): Les Jones
- Former series: A1 Grand Prix; Euroseries 3000

Teamcraft Motorsport was a British motorsport team based in Silverstone, UK. The team competed in the now defunct A1 Grand Prix and Euroseries 3000 series.

== History ==
The team ran the A1 Team Mexico car for the 2007–08 season, the team finished sixteenth in the 22 team Championship, with the team's best race result being two fourth places from Salvador Durán in the first round of the season in the Netherlands. The team was set to run the A1 Team Pakistan car in 2008–09 season with Adam Khan as the driver, however the team failed to attend any races.

The team competed first round of the 2009 Euroseries 3000 season at the Autódromo Internacional do Algarve with future Formula One Grand Prix winner Pastor Maldonado and Raffaele Giammaria. Maldonado won the first race, having started from second position. Giammaria however, failed to start both races with Maldonado finishing tenth in the second race. Teamcraft were taken over by Team Costa Rica from the third round at Zolder. Teamcraft finished eighth in the nine team Championship.

It was announced in November 2009 that the team would join the British Formula 3 championship in 2010, after the team completed a shakedown of the HWA/Mercedes-powered Mygale chassis at the Silverstone Circuit with Dean Smith. However the team did not enter in any race during the season.

== Results ==
A1 Grand Prix Results
Year	Car	Team	Races	Wins	Poles	F.L.	Points	T.C.
2007–08	Lola-Zytek	A1 Team Mexico	20	0	0	1	22	16th

Euroseries 3000 Results
Year	Car	Drivers	Races	Wins	Poles	F.L.	Points	D.C.	T.C.
2009	Lola-Zytek	(Venezuela) Pastor Maldonado	2	1	0	0	10	10th	8th
2009	Lola-Zytek	(Italy) Raffaele Giammaria	2	0	0	0	0	NC	8th
