= 2021 4 Hours of Portimão =

The layout of the Algarve International Circuit, where the race was held.

The 2021 4 Hours of Portimão was an endurance sportscar racing event held on 24 October 2021, at Algarve International Circuit, in Portugal. It was the sixth and final round of the 2021 European Le Mans Series.

== Entry list ==
The entry list was revealed on 13 October 2021, and saw 41 entries: 14 in LMP2, 17 in LMP3 and 10 in LMGTE.

== Race ==
=== Race Result ===
Class winners are marked in bold and ‡.

Pos.	Class	No.	Team	Drivers	Chassis	Tyre	Laps	Time/Retired
Pos.	Class	No.	Team	Drivers	Engine	Tyre	Laps	Time/Retired
1	**LMP2**	**22**	**(United Kingdom) United Autosports**	**(United Kingdom) Philip Hanson** **(South Africa) Jonathan Aberdein** **(United Kingdom) Tom Gamble**	**Oreca 07**	G	**130**	**4:00:00.433‡**
1	**LMP2**	**22**	**(United Kingdom) United Autosports**	**(United Kingdom) Philip Hanson** **(South Africa) Jonathan Aberdein** **(United Kingdom) Tom Gamble**	**Gibson GK428 4.2 L V8**	G	**130**	**4:00:00.433‡**
2	LMP2	41	(Belgium) Team WRT	(Switzerland) Louis Delétraz (Poland) Robert Kubica (China) Ye Yifei	Oreca 07	G	130	+21.748
2	LMP2	41	(Belgium) Team WRT	(Switzerland) Louis Delétraz (Poland) Robert Kubica (China) Ye Yifei	Gibson GK428 4.2 L V8	G	130	+21.748
3	LMP2	24	(Portugal) Algarve Pro Racing	(Germany) Sophia Flörsch (Austria) Ferdinand Habsburg (United Kingdom) Richard Bradley	Oreca 07	G	130	+22.678
3	LMP2	24	(Portugal) Algarve Pro Racing	(Germany) Sophia Flörsch (Austria) Ferdinand Habsburg (United Kingdom) Richard Bradley	Gibson GK428 4.2 L V8	G	130	+22.678
4	LMP2	65	(France) Panis Racing	(France) Julien Canal (United Kingdom) Will Stevens (Australia) James Allen	Oreca 07	G	130	+36.614
4	LMP2	65	(France) Panis Racing	(France) Julien Canal (United Kingdom) Will Stevens (Australia) James Allen	Gibson GK428 4.2 L V8	G	130	+36.614
5	LMP2	26	(Russia) G-Drive Racing	(Russia) Roman Rusinov (Argentina) Franco Colapinto (Netherlands) Nyck de Vries	Oreca 07	G	130	+39.330
5	LMP2	26	(Russia) G-Drive Racing	(Russia) Roman Rusinov (Argentina) Franco Colapinto (Netherlands) Nyck de Vries	Gibson GK428 4.2 L V8	G	130	+39.330
6	**LMP2 Pro-Am**	**37**	**(Switzerland) Cool Racing**	**(Switzerland) Alexandre Coigny** **(France) Nicolas Lapierre** **(France) Charles Milesi**	**Oreca 07**	G	**130**	**+1:21.074‡**
6	**LMP2 Pro-Am**	**37**	**(Switzerland) Cool Racing**	**(Switzerland) Alexandre Coigny** **(France) Nicolas Lapierre** **(France) Charles Milesi**	**Gibson GK428 4.2 L V8**	G	**130**	**+1:21.074‡**
7	LMP2	28	(France) IDEC Sport	(France) Paul Lafargue (France) Paul-Loup Chatin (France) Patrick Pilet	Oreca 07	G	129	+1 Lap
7	LMP2	28	(France) IDEC Sport	(France) Paul Lafargue (France) Paul-Loup Chatin (France) Patrick Pilet	Gibson GK428 4.2 L V8	G	129	+1 Lap
8	LMP2 Pro-Am	25	(Russia) G-Drive Racing	(United States) John Falb (Portugal) Rui Andrade (United States) Gustavo Menezes	Oreca 07	G	129	+1 Lap
8	LMP2 Pro-Am	25	(Russia) G-Drive Racing	(United States) John Falb (Portugal) Rui Andrade (United States) Gustavo Menezes	Gibson GK428 4.2 L V8	G	129	+1 Lap
9	LMP2	35	(United Kingdom) BHK Motorsport	(Italy) Francesco Dracone (Italy) Sergio Campana (Germany) Markus Pommer	Oreca 07	G	128	+2 Laps
9	LMP2	35	(United Kingdom) BHK Motorsport	(Italy) Francesco Dracone (Italy) Sergio Campana (Germany) Markus Pommer	Gibson GK428 4.2 L V8	G	128	+2 Laps
10	LMP2	32	(United Kingdom) United Autosports	(France) Nico Jamin (Venezuela) Manuel Maldonado (Netherlands) Job van Uitert	Oreca 07	G	128	+2 Laps
10	LMP2	32	(United Kingdom) United Autosports	(France) Nico Jamin (Venezuela) Manuel Maldonado (Netherlands) Job van Uitert	Gibson GK428 4.2 L V8	G	128	+2 Laps
11	LMP2	29	(France) Ultimate	(France) Matthieu Lahaye (France) Jean-Baptiste Lahaye (Italy) Gianluca Giraudi	Oreca 07	G	128	+2 Laps
11	LMP2	29	(France) Ultimate	(France) Matthieu Lahaye (France) Jean-Baptiste Lahaye (Italy) Gianluca Giraudi	Gibson GK428 4.2 L V8	G	128	+2 Laps
12	LMP2 Pro-Am	39	(France) Graff Racing	(France) Vincent Capillaire (France) Arnold Robin (France) Maxime Robin	Oreca 07	G	127	+3 Laps
12	LMP2 Pro-Am	39	(France) Graff Racing	(France) Vincent Capillaire (France) Arnold Robin (France) Maxime Robin	Gibson GK428 4.2 L V8	G	127	+3 Laps
13	**LMP3**	**13**	**(Poland) Inter Europol Competition**	**(Germany) Martin Hippe** **(Belgium) Ugo de Wilde** **(France) Adam Eteki**	**Ligier JS P320**	MI	**123**	**+7 Laps‡**
13	**LMP3**	**13**	**(Poland) Inter Europol Competition**	**(Germany) Martin Hippe** **(Belgium) Ugo de Wilde** **(France) Adam Eteki**	**Nissan VK56DE 5.6 L V8**	MI	**123**	**+7 Laps‡**
14	LMP3	2	(United Kingdom) United Autosports	(United Kingdom) Wayne Boyd (United Kingdom) Rob Wheldon (France) Edouard Cauhaupe	Ligier JS P320	MI	123	+7 Laps
14	LMP3	2	(United Kingdom) United Autosports	(United Kingdom) Wayne Boyd (United Kingdom) Rob Wheldon (France) Edouard Cauhaupe	Nissan VK56DE 5.6 L V8	MI	123	+7 Laps
15	LMP3	9	(France) Graff Racing	(Liechtenstein) Matthias Kaiser (Finland) Rory Penttinen	Ligier JS P320	MI	123	+7 Laps
15	LMP3	9	(France) Graff Racing	(Liechtenstein) Matthias Kaiser (Finland) Rory Penttinen	Nissan VK56DE 5.6 L V8	MI	123	+7 Laps
16	LMP3	4	(Luxembourg) DKR Engineering	(Germany) Laurents Hörr (France) Mathieu de Barbuat	Ligier JS P320	MI	123	+7 Laps
16	LMP3	4	(Luxembourg) DKR Engineering	(Germany) Laurents Hörr (France) Mathieu de Barbuat	Nissan VK56DE 5.6 L V8	MI	123	+7 Laps
17	LMP3	42	(France) Saintéloc Junior Team	(France) Fabien Michal (Switzerland) Lucas Légeret	Ligier JS P320	MI	122	+8 Laps
17	LMP3	42	(France) Saintéloc Junior Team	(France) Fabien Michal (Switzerland) Lucas Légeret	Nissan VK56DE 5.6 L V8	MI	122	+8 Laps
18	LMP3	8	(France) Graff Racing	(France) Eric Trouillet (Switzerland) Sébastien Page (Switzerland) David Droux	Ligier JS P320	MI	122	+8 Laps
18	LMP3	8	(France) Graff Racing	(France) Eric Trouillet (Switzerland) Sébastien Page (Switzerland) David Droux	Nissan VK56DE 5.6 L V8	MI	122	+8 Laps
19	LMP3	14	(Poland) Inter Europol Competition	(Poland) Mateusz Kaprzyk (Poland) Patryk Krupiński (Chile) Nico Pino	Ligier JS P320	MI	122	+8 Laps
19	LMP3	14	(Poland) Inter Europol Competition	(Poland) Mateusz Kaprzyk (Poland) Patryk Krupiński (Chile) Nico Pino	Nissan VK56DE 5.6 L V8	MI	122	+8 Laps
20	LMP3	19	(Switzerland) Cool Racing	(Switzerland) Nicolas Maulini (United Kingdom) Matt Bell (Germany) Niklas Krütten	Ligier JS P320	MI	122	+8 Laps
20	LMP3	19	(Switzerland) Cool Racing	(Switzerland) Nicolas Maulini (United Kingdom) Matt Bell (Germany) Niklas Krütten	Nissan VK56DE 5.6 L V8	MI	122	+8 Laps
21	LMP3	11	(Italy) Eurointernational	(France) Antoine Doquin (Italy) Mattia Drudi (Germany) Finn Gehrsitz	Ligier JS P320	MI	122	+8 Laps
21	LMP3	11	(Italy) Eurointernational	(France) Antoine Doquin (Italy) Mattia Drudi (Germany) Finn Gehrsitz	Nissan VK56DE 5.6 L V8	MI	122	+8 Laps
22	LMP3	3	(United Kingdom) United Autosports	(United States) Jim McGuire (United Kingdom) Duncan Tappy (United Kingdom) Andrew Bentley	Ligier JS P320	MI	121	+9 Laps
22	LMP3	3	(United Kingdom) United Autosports	(United States) Jim McGuire (United Kingdom) Duncan Tappy (United Kingdom) Andrew Bentley	Nissan VK56DE 5.6 L V8	MI	121	+9 Laps
23	LMP3	20	(Poland) Team Virage	(United States) Rob Hodes (Switzerland) Alex Fontana (Algeria) Julien Gerbi	Ligier JS P320	MI	121	+9 Laps
23	LMP3	20	(Poland) Team Virage	(United States) Rob Hodes (Switzerland) Alex Fontana (Algeria) Julien Gerbi	Nissan VK56DE 5.6 L V8	MI	121	+9 Laps
24	LMP3	6	(United Kingdom) Nielsen Racing	(United Kingdom) Nicholas Adcock (United States) Austin McCusker (Netherlands) Max Koebolt	Ligier JS P320	MI	121	+9 Laps
24	LMP3	6	(United Kingdom) Nielsen Racing	(United Kingdom) Nicholas Adcock (United States) Austin McCusker (Netherlands) Max Koebolt	Nissan VK56DE 5.6 L V8	MI	121	+9 Laps
25	**LMGTE**	**80**	**(Italy) Iron Lynx**	**(Italy) Matteo Cressoni** **(Italy) Rino Mastronardi** **(Spain) Miguel Molina**	**Ferrari 488 GTE Evo**	G	**121**	**+9 Laps‡**
25	**LMGTE**	**80**	**(Italy) Iron Lynx**	**(Italy) Matteo Cressoni** **(Italy) Rino Mastronardi** **(Spain) Miguel Molina**	**Ferrari F154CB 3.9 L Turbo V8**	G	**121**	**+9 Laps‡**
26	LMGTE	93	(Germany) Proton Competition	(Republic of Ireland) Michael Fassbender (Germany) Felipe Fernández Laser (Austria) Richard Lietz	Porsche 911 RSR-19	G	121	+9 Laps
26	LMGTE	93	(Germany) Proton Competition	(Republic of Ireland) Michael Fassbender (Germany) Felipe Fernández Laser (Austria) Richard Lietz	Porsche 4.2 L Flat-6	G	121	+9 Laps
27	LMGTE	83	(Italy) Iron Lynx	(Switzerland) Rahel Frey (Denmark) Michelle Gatting (Belgium) Sarah Bovy	Ferrari 488 GTE Evo	G	120	+10 Laps
27	LMGTE	83	(Italy) Iron Lynx	(Switzerland) Rahel Frey (Denmark) Michelle Gatting (Belgium) Sarah Bovy	Ferrari F154CB 3.9 L Turbo V8	G	120	+10 Laps
28	LMGTE	55	(Switzerland) Spirit of Race	(United Kingdom) Duncan Cameron (Republic of Ireland) Matt Griffin (South Africa) David Perel	Ferrari 488 GTE Evo	G	120	+10 Laps
28	LMGTE	55	(Switzerland) Spirit of Race	(United Kingdom) Duncan Cameron (Republic of Ireland) Matt Griffin (South Africa) David Perel	Ferrari F154CB 3.9 L Turbo V8	G	120	+10 Laps
29	LMGTE	77	(Germany) Proton Competition	(Germany) Christian Ried (United States) Cooper MacNeil (Italy) Gianmaria Bruni	Porsche 911 RSR-19	G	120	+10 Laps
29	LMGTE	77	(Germany) Proton Competition	(Germany) Christian Ried (United States) Cooper MacNeil (Italy) Gianmaria Bruni	Porsche 4.2 L Flat-6	G	120	+10 Laps
30	LMGTE	66	(United Kingdom) JMW Motorsport	(United Kingdom) Jody Fannin (Hong Kong) Shaun Thong (United States) Rodrigo Sales	Ferrari 488 GTE Evo	G	120	+10 Laps
30	LMGTE	66	(United Kingdom) JMW Motorsport	(United Kingdom) Jody Fannin (Hong Kong) Shaun Thong (United States) Rodrigo Sales	Ferrari F154CB 3.9 L Turbo V8	G	120	+10 Laps
31	LMGTE	95	(United Kingdom) TF Sport	(United Kingdom) John Hartshorne (United Kingdom) Ross Gunn (United Kingdom) Ollie Hancock	Aston Martin Vantage AMR	G	120	+10 Laps
31	LMGTE	95	(United Kingdom) TF Sport	(United Kingdom) John Hartshorne (United Kingdom) Ross Gunn (United Kingdom) Ollie Hancock	Aston Martin 4.0 L Turbo V8	G	120	+10 Laps
32	LMP3	12	(Luxembourg) Racing Experience	(Belgium) Tom Cloet (Luxembourg) Gary Hauser (Portugal) Guilherme Oliveira	Duqueine M30 - D08	MI	120	+10 Laps
32	LMP3	12	(Luxembourg) Racing Experience	(Belgium) Tom Cloet (Luxembourg) Gary Hauser (Portugal) Guilherme Oliveira	Nissan VK56DE 5.6 L V8	MI	120	+10 Laps
33	LMGTE	60	(Italy) Iron Lynx	(Italy) Claudio Schiavoni (Italy) Giorgio Sernagiotto (Italy) Paolo Ruberti	Ferrari 488 GTE Evo	G	120	+10 Laps
33	LMGTE	60	(Italy) Iron Lynx	(Italy) Claudio Schiavoni (Italy) Giorgio Sernagiotto (Italy) Paolo Ruberti	Ferrari F154CB 3.9 L Turbo V8	G	120	+10 Laps
34	LMGTE	61	(Italy) AF Corse	(France) Franck Dezoteux (France) Pierre Ragues (France) Côme Ledogar	Ferrari 488 GTE Evo	G	120	+10 Laps
34	LMGTE	61	(Italy) AF Corse	(France) Franck Dezoteux (France) Pierre Ragues (France) Côme Ledogar	Ferrari F154CB 3.9 L Turbo V8	G	120	+10 Laps
35	LMGTE	88	(Italy) AF Corse	(France) Emmanuel Collard (France) François Perrodo (Italy) Alessio Rovera	Ferrari 488 GTE Evo	G	120	+10 Laps
35	LMGTE	88	(Italy) AF Corse	(France) Emmanuel Collard (France) François Perrodo (Italy) Alessio Rovera	Ferrari F154CB 3.9 L Turbo V8	G	120	+10 Laps
36	LMP3	7	(United Kingdom) Nielsen Racing	(United Kingdom) Anthony Wells (United Kingdom) Colin Noble	Ligier JS P320	MI	109	+21 Laps
36	LMP3	7	(United Kingdom) Nielsen Racing	(United Kingdom) Anthony Wells (United Kingdom) Colin Noble	Nissan VK56DE 5.6 L V8	MI	109	+21 Laps
DNF	LMP3	15	(United Kingdom) RLR MSport	(United Kingdom) Michael Benham (United Kingdom) Alex Kapadia (Denmark) Malthe Jakobsen	Ligier JS P320	MI	100	Did not finish
DNF	LMP3	15	(United Kingdom) RLR MSport	(United Kingdom) Michael Benham (United Kingdom) Alex Kapadia (Denmark) Malthe Jakobsen	Nissan VK56DE 5.6 L V8	MI	100	Did not finish
DNF	LMP3	5	(France) MV2S Racing	(France) Christophe Cresp (France) Fabien Lavergne (France) Adrien Chila	Ligier JS P320	MI	98	Did not finish
DNF	LMP3	5	(France) MV2S Racing	(France) Christophe Cresp (France) Fabien Lavergne (France) Adrien Chila	Nissan VK56DE 5.6 L V8	MI	98	Did not finish
DNF	LMP2	30	(France) Duqueine Team	(France) Tristan Gommendy (Austria) René Binder (Mexico) Memo Rojas	Oreca 07	G	17	Accident
DNF	LMP2	30	(France) Duqueine Team	(France) Tristan Gommendy (Austria) René Binder (Mexico) Memo Rojas	Gibson GK428 4.2 L V8	G	17	Accident
DNF	LMP3	18	(Italy) 1 AIM Villorba Corse	(Italy) Alessandro Bressan (Greece) Andreas Laskaratos (Italy) Damiano Fioravanti	Ligier JS P320	MI	15	Crash
DNF	LMP3	18	(Italy) 1 AIM Villorba Corse	(Italy) Alessandro Bressan (Greece) Andreas Laskaratos (Italy) Damiano Fioravanti	Nissan VK56DE 5.6 L V8	MI	15	Crash

European Le Mans Series
Previous race: 4 Hours of Spa-Francorchamps	2021 season	Next race: none
