= 2021 4 Hours of Red Bull Ring =

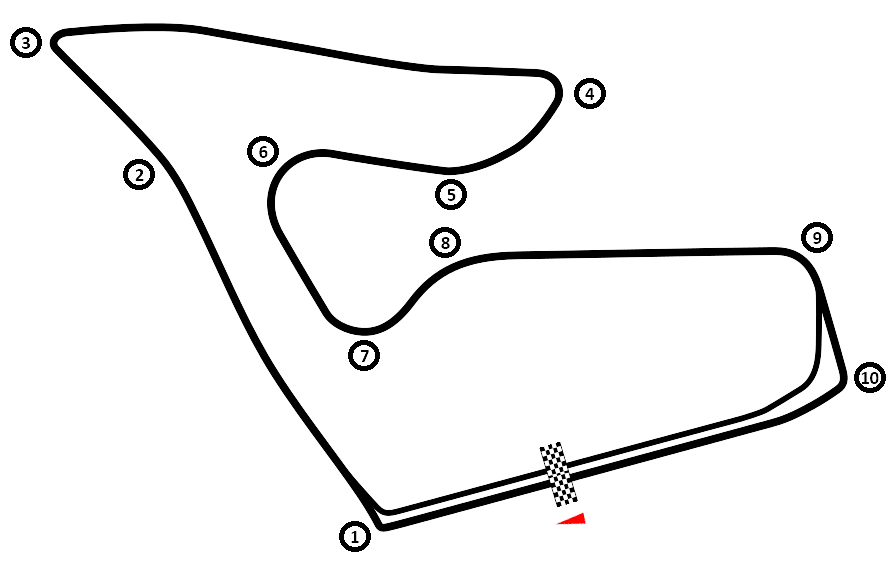
The layout of the Red Bull Ring, where the race was held.

The 2021 4 Hours of Red Bull Ring was an endurance sportscar racing event held on 16 May, 2021, at Red Bull Ring. It was the second round of the 2021 European Le Mans Series, and the seventh running of the event as part of the European Le Mans Series.

== Entry list ==
The entry list was revealed on 7 May 2021, and saw 41 entries: 16 in LMP2, 16 in LMP3 and 9 in LMGTE.

== Race ==
=== Race Result ===
Class winners are marked in bold and ‡.

Pos.	Class	No.	Team	Drivers	Chassis	Tyre	Laps	Time/Retired
Pos.	Class	No.	Team	Drivers	Engine	Tyre	Laps	Time/Retired
1	**LMP2**	**41**	**(Belgium) Team WRT**	**(Switzerland) Louis Delétraz** **(Poland) Robert Kubica** **(China) Ye Yifei**	**Oreca 07**	G	**149**	**4:00:49.743‡**
1	**LMP2**	**41**	**(Belgium) Team WRT**	**(Switzerland) Louis Delétraz** **(Poland) Robert Kubica** **(China) Ye Yifei**	**Gibson GK428 4.2 L V8**	G	**149**	**4:00:49.743‡**
2	LMP2	26	(Russia) G-Drive Racing	(Russia) Roman Rusinov (Argentina) Franco Colapinto (Netherlands) Nyck de Vries	Oreca 07	G	149	+21.511
2	LMP2	26	(Russia) G-Drive Racing	(Russia) Roman Rusinov (Argentina) Franco Colapinto (Netherlands) Nyck de Vries	Gibson GK428 4.2 L V8	G	149	+21.511
3	**LMP2 Pro-Am**	**25**	**(Russia) G-Drive Racing**	**(United States) John Falb** **(Portugal) Rui Andrade** **(Spain) Roberto Merhi**	**Oreca 07**	G	**149**	**+1:32.227‡**
3	**LMP2 Pro-Am**	**25**	**(Russia) G-Drive Racing**	**(United States) John Falb** **(Portugal) Rui Andrade** **(Spain) Roberto Merhi**	**Gibson GK428 4.2 L V8**	G	**149**	**+1:32.227‡**
4	LMP2 Pro-Am	34	Racing Team Turkey	(Turkey) Salih Yoluç (Republic of Ireland) Charlie Eastwood (United States) Logan Sargeant	Oreca 07	G	148	+1 Lap
4	LMP2 Pro-Am	34	Racing Team Turkey	(Turkey) Salih Yoluç (Republic of Ireland) Charlie Eastwood (United States) Logan Sargeant	Gibson GK428 4.2 L V8	G	148	+1 Lap
5	LMP2 Pro-Am	29	(France) Ultimate	(France) Matthieu Lahaye (France) Jean-Baptiste Lahaye (France) François Heriau	Oreca 07	G	148	+1 Lap
5	LMP2 Pro-Am	29	(France) Ultimate	(France) Matthieu Lahaye (France) Jean-Baptiste Lahaye (France) François Heriau	Gibson GK428 4.2 L V8	G	148	+1 Lap
6	LMP2	28	(France) IDEC Sport	(France) Paul Lafargue (France) Paul-Loup Chatin (France) Patrick Pilet	Oreca 07	G	148	+1 Lap
6	LMP2	28	(France) IDEC Sport	(France) Paul Lafargue (France) Paul-Loup Chatin (France) Patrick Pilet	Gibson GK428 4.2 L V8	G	148	+1 Lap
7	LMP2	22	(United Kingdom) United Autosports	(United Kingdom) Philip Hanson (South Africa) Jonathan Aberdein (United Kingdom) Tom Gamble	Oreca 07	G	148	+1 Lap
7	LMP2	22	(United Kingdom) United Autosports	(United Kingdom) Philip Hanson (South Africa) Jonathan Aberdein (United Kingdom) Tom Gamble	Gibson GK428 4.2 L V8	G	148	+1 Lap
8	LMP2	24	(Portugal) Algarve Pro Racing	(Mexico) Diego Menchaca (Austria) Ferdinand Habsburg (United Kingdom) Richard Bradley	Oreca 07	G	148	+1 Lap
8	LMP2	24	(Portugal) Algarve Pro Racing	(Mexico) Diego Menchaca (Austria) Ferdinand Habsburg (United Kingdom) Richard Bradley	Gibson GK428 4.2 L V8	G	148	+1 Lap
9	LMP2	30	(France) Duqueine Team	(France) Tristan Gommendy (Austria) René Binder (Mexico) Memo Rojas	Oreca 07	G	148	+1 Lap
9	LMP2	30	(France) Duqueine Team	(France) Tristan Gommendy (Austria) René Binder (Mexico) Memo Rojas	Gibson GK428 4.2 L V8	G	148	+1 Lap
10	LMP2 Pro-Am	37	(Switzerland) Cool Racing	(Switzerland) Alexandre Coigny (France) Nicolas Lapierre (Switzerland) Antonin Borga	Oreca 07	G	147	+2 Laps
10	LMP2 Pro-Am	37	(Switzerland) Cool Racing	(Switzerland) Alexandre Coigny (France) Nicolas Lapierre (Switzerland) Antonin Borga	Gibson GK428 4.2 L V8	G	147	+2 Laps
11	LMP2 Pro-Am	17	(France) IDEC Sport	(United States) Dwight Merriman (United Kingdom) Kyle Tilley (United Kingdom) Ryan Dalziel	Oreca 07	G	146	+3 Laps
11	LMP2 Pro-Am	17	(France) IDEC Sport	(United States) Dwight Merriman (United Kingdom) Kyle Tilley (United Kingdom) Ryan Dalziel	Gibson GK428 4.2 L V8	G	146	+3 Laps
12	LMP2 Pro-Am	21	(United States) DragonSpeed USA	(Sweden) Henrik Hedman (United Kingdom) Ben Hanley (United States) Gustavo Menezes	Oreca 07	G	146	+3 Laps
12	LMP2 Pro-Am	21	(United States) DragonSpeed USA	(Sweden) Henrik Hedman (United Kingdom) Ben Hanley (United States) Gustavo Menezes	Gibson GK428 4.2 L V8	G	146	+3 Laps
13	LMP2 Pro-Am	39	(France) Graff Racing	(France) Vincent Capillaire (France) Maxime Robin (France) Arnold Robin	Oreca 07	G	145	+4 Laps
13	LMP2 Pro-Am	39	(France) Graff Racing	(France) Vincent Capillaire (France) Maxime Robin (France) Arnold Robin	Gibson GK428 4.2 L V8	G	145	+4 Laps
14	LMP2	65	(France) Panis Racing	(France) Julien Canal (United Kingdom) Will Stevens (Australia) James Allen	Oreca 07	G	145	+4 Laps
14	LMP2	65	(France) Panis Racing	(France) Julien Canal (United Kingdom) Will Stevens (Australia) James Allen	Gibson GK428 4.2 L V8	G	145	+4 Laps
15	LMP2	35	(United Kingdom) BHK Motorsport	(Italy) Francesco Dracone (Italy) Sergio Campana (Germany) Markus Pommer	Oreca 07	G	145	+4 Laps
15	LMP2	35	(United Kingdom) BHK Motorsport	(Italy) Francesco Dracone (Italy) Sergio Campana (Germany) Markus Pommer	Gibson GK428 4.2 L V8	G	145	+4 Laps
16	**LMP3**	**19**	**(Switzerland) Cool Racing**	**(Switzerland) Nicolas Maulini** **(United Kingdom) Matt Bell** **(Germany) Niklas Krütten**	**Ligier JS P320**	MI	**143**	**+6 Laps‡**
16	**LMP3**	**19**	**(Switzerland) Cool Racing**	**(Switzerland) Nicolas Maulini** **(United Kingdom) Matt Bell** **(Germany) Niklas Krütten**	**Nissan VK56DE 5.6 L V8**	MI	**143**	**+6 Laps‡**
17	LMP3	11	(Italy) Eurointernational	(Italy) Andrea Domedari (Netherlands) Joey Alders (Turkey) Cem Bölükbaşı	Ligier JS P320	MI	143	+6 Laps
17	LMP3	11	(Italy) Eurointernational	(Italy) Andrea Domedari (Netherlands) Joey Alders (Turkey) Cem Bölükbaşı	Nissan VK56DE 5.6 L V8	MI	143	+6 Laps
18	LMP3	8	(France) Graff Racing	(France) Eric Trouillet (Switzerland) Sébastien Page (Switzerland) David Droux	Ligier JS P320	MI	143	+6 Laps
18	LMP3	8	(France) Graff Racing	(France) Eric Trouillet (Switzerland) Sébastien Page (Switzerland) David Droux	Nissan VK56DE 5.6 L V8	MI	143	+6 Laps
19	LMP3	13	(Poland) Inter Europol Competition	(Germany) Martin Hippe (Belgium) Ugo de Wilde (Belgium) Ulysse de Pauw	Ligier JS P320	MI	142	+7 Laps
19	LMP3	13	(Poland) Inter Europol Competition	(Germany) Martin Hippe (Belgium) Ugo de Wilde (Belgium) Ulysse de Pauw	Nissan VK56DE 5.6 L V8	MI	142	+7 Laps
20	LMP3	14	(Poland) Inter Europol Competition	(Poland) Mateusz Kaprzyk (Lithuania) Gustas Grinbergas (Italy) Mattia Pasini	Ligier JS P320	MI	142	+7 Laps
20	LMP3	14	(Poland) Inter Europol Competition	(Poland) Mateusz Kaprzyk (Lithuania) Gustas Grinbergas (Italy) Mattia Pasini	Nissan VK56DE 5.6 L V8	MI	142	+7 Laps
21	LMP3	2	(United Kingdom) United Autosports	(United Kingdom) Wayne Boyd (United Kingdom) Rob Wheldon (France) Edouard Cauhaupe	Ligier JS P320	MI	142	+7 Laps
21	LMP3	2	(United Kingdom) United Autosports	(United Kingdom) Wayne Boyd (United Kingdom) Rob Wheldon (France) Edouard Cauhaupe	Nissan VK56DE 5.6 L V8	MI	142	+7 Laps
22	LMP3	5	(France) MV2S Racing	(France) Christophe Cresp (France) Fabien Lavergne (France) Adrien Chila	Ligier JS P320	MI	142	+7 Laps
22	LMP3	5	(France) MV2S Racing	(France) Christophe Cresp (France) Fabien Lavergne (France) Adrien Chila	Nissan VK56DE 5.6 L V8	MI	142	+7 Laps
23	LMP2	32	(United Kingdom) United Autosports	(Netherlands) Job van Uitert (France) Nico Jamin (Venezuela) Manuel Maldonado	Oreca 07	G	142	+7 Laps
23	LMP2	32	(United Kingdom) United Autosports	(Netherlands) Job van Uitert (France) Nico Jamin (Venezuela) Manuel Maldonado	Gibson GK428 4.2 L V8	G	142	+7 Laps
24	**LMGTE**	**88**	**(Italy) AF Corse**	**(France) Emmanuel Collard** **(France) François Perrodo** **(Italy) Alessio Rovera**	**Ferrari 488 GTE Evo**	G	**142**	**+7 Laps‡**
24	**LMGTE**	**88**	**(Italy) AF Corse**	**(France) Emmanuel Collard** **(France) François Perrodo** **(Italy) Alessio Rovera**	**Ferrari F154CB 3.9 L Turbo V8**	G	**142**	**+7 Laps‡**
25	LMP3	4	(Luxembourg) DKR Engineering	(Germany) Laurents Hörr (Germany) Leonard Weiss (France) Jean-Phillipe Dayrault	Ligier JS P320	MI	141	+8 Laps
25	LMP3	4	(Luxembourg) DKR Engineering	(Germany) Laurents Hörr (Germany) Leonard Weiss (France) Jean-Phillipe Dayrault	Nissan VK56DE 5.6 L V8	MI	141	+8 Laps
26	LMGTE	55	(Switzerland) Spirit of Race	(United Kingdom) Duncan Cameron (Republic of Ireland) Matt Griffin (South Africa) David Perel	Ferrari 488 GTE Evo	G	141	+8 Laps
26	LMGTE	55	(Switzerland) Spirit of Race	(United Kingdom) Duncan Cameron (Republic of Ireland) Matt Griffin (South Africa) David Perel	Ferrari F154CB 3.9 L Turbo V8	G	141	+8 Laps
27	LMGTE	80	(Italy) Iron Lynx	(Italy) Matteo Cressoni (Italy) Rino Mastronardi (Spain) Miguel Molina	Ferrari 488 GTE Evo	G	141	+8 Laps
27	LMGTE	80	(Italy) Iron Lynx	(Italy) Matteo Cressoni (Italy) Rino Mastronardi (Spain) Miguel Molina	Ferrari F154CB 3.9 L Turbo V8	G	141	+8 Laps
28	LMP3	3	(United Kingdom) United Autosports	(United States) Jim McGuire (United Kingdom) Duncan Tappy (United Kingdom) Andrew Bentley	Ligier JS P320	MI	141	+8 Laps
28	LMP3	3	(United Kingdom) United Autosports	(United States) Jim McGuire (United Kingdom) Duncan Tappy (United Kingdom) Andrew Bentley	Nissan VK56DE 5.6 L V8	MI	141	+8 Laps
29	LMP3	6	(United Kingdom) Nielsen Racing	(United Kingdom) Nicholas Adcock (United States) Austin McCusker (Netherlands) Max Koebolt	Ligier JS P320	MI	141	+8 Laps
29	LMP3	6	(United Kingdom) Nielsen Racing	(United Kingdom) Nicholas Adcock (United States) Austin McCusker (Netherlands) Max Koebolt	Nissan VK56DE 5.6 L V8	MI	141	+8 Laps
30	LMP3	7	(United Kingdom) Nielsen Racing	(United Kingdom) Anthony Wells (United Kingdom) Colin Noble	Ligier JS P320	MI	141	+8 Laps
30	LMP3	7	(United Kingdom) Nielsen Racing	(United Kingdom) Anthony Wells (United Kingdom) Colin Noble	Nissan VK56DE 5.6 L V8	MI	141	+8 Laps
31	LMGTE	93	(Germany) Proton Competition	(Republic of Ireland) Michael Fassbender (Germany) Felipe Fernández Laser (Austria) Richard Lietz	Porsche 911 RSR-19	G	141	+8 Laps
31	LMGTE	93	(Germany) Proton Competition	(Republic of Ireland) Michael Fassbender (Germany) Felipe Fernández Laser (Austria) Richard Lietz	Porsche 4.2 L Flat-6	G	141	+8 Laps
32	LMGTE	66	(United Kingdom) JMW Motorsport	(United Kingdom) Jody Fannin (Italy) Andrea Fontana (United States) Rodrigo Sales	Ferrari 488 GTE Evo	G	140	+9 Laps
32	LMGTE	66	(United Kingdom) JMW Motorsport	(United Kingdom) Jody Fannin (Italy) Andrea Fontana (United States) Rodrigo Sales	Ferrari F154CB 3.9 L Turbo V8	G	140	+9 Laps
33	LMGTE	77	(Germany) Proton Competition	(Germany) Christian Ried (United States) Cooper MacNeil (Australia) Matt Campbell	Porsche 911 RSR-19	G	140	+9 Laps
33	LMGTE	77	(Germany) Proton Competition	(Germany) Christian Ried (United States) Cooper MacNeil (Australia) Matt Campbell	Porsche 4.2 L Flat-6	G	140	+9 Laps
34	LMGTE	60	(Italy) Iron Lynx	(Italy) Claudio Schiavoni (Italy) Giorgio Sernagiotto (Italy) Paolo Ruberti	Ferrari 488 GTE Evo	G	140	+9 Laps
34	LMGTE	60	(Italy) Iron Lynx	(Italy) Claudio Schiavoni (Italy) Giorgio Sernagiotto (Italy) Paolo Ruberti	Ferrari F154CB 3.9 L Turbo V8	G	140	+9 Laps
35	LMGTE	95	(United Kingdom) TF Sport	(United Kingdom) John Hartshorne (United Kingdom) Jonathan Adam (United Kingdom) Ollie Hancock	Aston Martin Vantage AMR	G	139	+10 Laps
35	LMGTE	95	(United Kingdom) TF Sport	(United Kingdom) John Hartshorne (United Kingdom) Jonathan Adam (United Kingdom) Ollie Hancock	Aston Martin 4.0 L Turbo V8	G	139	+10 Laps
36	LMP3	9	(France) Graff Racing	(Liechtenstein) Matthias Kaiser (Finland) Rory Penttinen	Ligier JS P320	MI	120	+29 Laps
36	LMP3	9	(France) Graff Racing	(Liechtenstein) Matthias Kaiser (Finland) Rory Penttinen	Nissan VK56DE 5.6 L V8	MI	120	+29 Laps
DNF	LMGTE	83	(Italy) Iron Lynx	(Switzerland) Rahel Frey (Denmark) Michelle Gatting (Italy) Manuela Gostner	Ferrari 488 GTE Evo	G	140	Contact
DNF	LMGTE	83	(Italy) Iron Lynx	(Switzerland) Rahel Frey (Denmark) Michelle Gatting (Italy) Manuela Gostner	Ferrari F154CB 3.9 L Turbo V8	G	140	Contact
DNF	LMP3	12	(Luxembourg) Racing Experience	(Luxembourg) David Hauser (Luxembourg) Gary Hauser (Belgium) Tom Cloet	Ligier JS P320	MI	93	Crash
DNF	LMP3	12	(Luxembourg) Racing Experience	(Luxembourg) David Hauser (Luxembourg) Gary Hauser (Belgium) Tom Cloet	Nissan VK56DE 5.6 L V8	MI	93	Crash
DNF	LMP3	15	(United Kingdom) RLR MSport	(United Kingdom) Michael Benham (United Kingdom) Alex Kapadia (Denmark) Malthe Jakobsen	Ligier JS P320	MI	38	Contact
DNF	LMP3	15	(United Kingdom) RLR MSport	(United Kingdom) Michael Benham (United Kingdom) Alex Kapadia (Denmark) Malthe Jakobsen	Nissan VK56DE 5.6 L V8	MI	38	Contact
DNF	LMP3	18	(Italy) 1 AIM Villorba Corse	(Italy) Alessandro Bressan (Greece) Andreas Laskaratos (Italy) Damiano Fioravanti	Ligier JS P320	MI	1	Accident
DNF	LMP3	18	(Italy) 1 AIM Villorba Corse	(Italy) Alessandro Bressan (Greece) Andreas Laskaratos (Italy) Damiano Fioravanti	Nissan VK56DE 5.6 L V8	MI	1	Accident
DNF	LMP3	20	(Poland) Team Virage	(United States) Rob Hodes (Canada) Garett Grist (United States) C. R. Crews	Ligier JS P320	MI	1	Accident
DNF	LMP3	20	(Poland) Team Virage	(United States) Rob Hodes (Canada) Garett Grist (United States) C. R. Crews	Nissan VK56DE 5.6 L V8	MI	1	Accident

European Le Mans Series
Previous race: 4 Hours of Barcelona	2021 season	Next race: 4 Hours of Le Castellet
