= 2021 4 Hours of Le Castellet =

The layout of the Circuit Paul Ricard, where the race was held.

The 2021 4 Hours of Le Castellet was an endurance sportscar racing event held on 6 June, 2021, at Circuit Paul Ricard. It was the third round of the 2021 European Le Mans Series, and the 13th running of the event as part of the European Le Mans Series.

== Entry list ==
The entry list was revealed on 2 June 2021, and saw 42 entries: 16 in LMP2, 16 in LMP3, 9 in LMGTE and 1 Innovative car.

== Race ==
=== Race Result ===
Class winners are marked in bold and ‡.

Pos.	Class	No.	Team	Drivers	Chassis	Tyre	Laps	Time/Retired
Pos.	Class	No.	Team	Drivers	Engine	Tyre	Laps	Time/Retired
1	**LMP2**	**26**	**(Russia) G-Drive Racing**	**(Russia) Roman Rusinov** **(Argentina) Franco Colapinto** **(Netherlands) Nyck de Vries**	**Oreca 07**	**G**	**126**	**4:00:17.286‡**
1	**LMP2**	**26**	**(Russia) G-Drive Racing**	**(Russia) Roman Rusinov** **(Argentina) Franco Colapinto** **(Netherlands) Nyck de Vries**	**Gibson GK428 4.2 L V8**	**G**	**126**	**4:00:17.286‡**
2	LMP2	22	(United Kingdom) United Autosports	(United Kingdom) Philip Hanson (South Africa) Jonathan Aberdein (United Kingdom) Tom Gamble	Oreca 07	**G**	126	+6.385
2	LMP2	22	(United Kingdom) United Autosports	(United Kingdom) Philip Hanson (South Africa) Jonathan Aberdein (United Kingdom) Tom Gamble	Gibson GK428 4.2 L V8	**G**	126	+6.385
3	LMP2	32	(United Kingdom) United Autosports	(Netherlands) Job van Uitert (France) Nico Jamin (Venezuela) Manuel Maldonado	Oreca 07	**G**	126	+24.272
3	LMP2	32	(United Kingdom) United Autosports	(Netherlands) Job van Uitert (France) Nico Jamin (Venezuela) Manuel Maldonado	Gibson GK428 4.2 L V8	**G**	126	+24.272
4	LMP2	30	(France) Duqueine Team	(France) Tristan Gommendy (Austria) René Binder (Mexico) Memo Rojas	Oreca 07	**G**	126	+43.171
4	LMP2	30	(France) Duqueine Team	(France) Tristan Gommendy (Austria) René Binder (Mexico) Memo Rojas	Gibson GK428 4.2 L V8	**G**	126	+43.171
5	LMP2	41	(Belgium) Team WRT	(Switzerland) Louis Delétraz (Poland) Robert Kubica (China) Ye Yifei	Oreca 07	**G**	126	+51.000
5	LMP2	41	(Belgium) Team WRT	(Switzerland) Louis Delétraz (Poland) Robert Kubica (China) Ye Yifei	Gibson GK428 4.2 L V8	**G**	126	+51.000
6	**LMP2 Pro-Am**	**34**	**Racing Team Turkey**	**(Turkey) Salih Yoluç** **(Republic of Ireland) Charlie Eastwood** **(United Kingdom) Harry Tincknell**	**Oreca 07**	**G**	**126**	**+54.767‡**
6	**LMP2 Pro-Am**	**34**	**Racing Team Turkey**	**(Turkey) Salih Yoluç** **(Republic of Ireland) Charlie Eastwood** **(United Kingdom) Harry Tincknell**	**Gibson GK428 4.2 L V8**	**G**	**126**	**+54.767‡**
7	LMP2	24	(Portugal) Algarve Pro Racing	(Mexico) Diego Menchaca (Austria) Ferdinand Habsburg (United Kingdom) Richard Bradley	Oreca 07	**G**	126	+1:24.841
7	LMP2	24	(Portugal) Algarve Pro Racing	(Mexico) Diego Menchaca (Austria) Ferdinand Habsburg (United Kingdom) Richard Bradley	Gibson GK428 4.2 L V8	**G**	126	+1:24.841
8	LMP2	65	(France) Panis Racing	(France) Julien Canal (United Kingdom) Will Stevens (Australia) James Allen	Oreca 07	**G**	125	+1 Lap
8	LMP2	65	(France) Panis Racing	(France) Julien Canal (United Kingdom) Will Stevens (Australia) James Allen	Gibson GK428 4.2 L V8	**G**	125	+1 Lap
9	LMP2	28	(France) IDEC Sport	(France) Paul Lafargue (France) Paul-Loup Chatin (France) Jean-Éric Vergne	Oreca 07	**G**	125	+1 Lap
9	LMP2	28	(France) IDEC Sport	(France) Paul Lafargue (France) Paul-Loup Chatin (France) Jean-Éric Vergne	Gibson GK428 4.2 L V8	**G**	125	+1 Lap
10	LMP2 Pro-Am	25	(Russia) G-Drive Racing	(United States) John Falb (Portugal) Rui Andrade (Spain) Roberto Merhi	Oreca 07	**G**	125	+1 Lap
10	LMP2 Pro-Am	25	(Russia) G-Drive Racing	(United States) John Falb (Portugal) Rui Andrade (Spain) Roberto Merhi	Gibson GK428 4.2 L V8	**G**	125	+1 Lap
11	LMP2	35	(United Kingdom) BHK Motorsport	(Italy) Francesco Dracone (Italy) Sergio Campana (Germany) Markus Pommer	Oreca 07	**G**	125	+1 Lap
11	LMP2	35	(United Kingdom) BHK Motorsport	(Italy) Francesco Dracone (Italy) Sergio Campana (Germany) Markus Pommer	Gibson GK428 4.2 L V8	**G**	125	+1 Lap
12	LMP2 Pro-Am	37	(Switzerland) Cool Racing	(Switzerland) Alexandre Coigny (France) Nicolas Lapierre (Switzerland) Antonin Borga	Oreca 07	**G**	125	+1 Lap
12	LMP2 Pro-Am	37	(Switzerland) Cool Racing	(Switzerland) Alexandre Coigny (France) Nicolas Lapierre (Switzerland) Antonin Borga	Gibson GK428 4.2 L V8	**G**	125	+1 Lap
13	LMP2 Pro-Am	29	(France) Ultimate	(France) Matthieu Lahaye (France) Jean-Baptiste Lahaye (France) François Heriau	Oreca 07	**G**	124	+2 Laps
13	LMP2 Pro-Am	29	(France) Ultimate	(France) Matthieu Lahaye (France) Jean-Baptiste Lahaye (France) François Heriau	Gibson GK428 4.2 L V8	**G**	124	+2 Laps
14	LMP2 Pro-Am	39	(France) Graff Racing	(France) Vincent Capillaire (France) Maxime Robin (France) Arnold Robin	Oreca 07	**G**	124	+2 Laps
14	LMP2 Pro-Am	39	(France) Graff Racing	(France) Vincent Capillaire (France) Maxime Robin (France) Arnold Robin	Gibson GK428 4.2 L V8	**G**	124	+2 Laps
15	LMP2 Pro-Am	17	(France) IDEC Sport	(United States) Dwight Merriman (United Kingdom) Kyle Tilley (France) Gabriel Aubry	Oreca 07	**G**	122	+4 Laps
15	LMP2 Pro-Am	17	(France) IDEC Sport	(United States) Dwight Merriman (United Kingdom) Kyle Tilley (France) Gabriel Aubry	Gibson GK428 4.2 L V8	**G**	122	+4 Laps
16	**LMP3**	**4**	**(Luxembourg) DKR Engineering**	**(Germany) Laurents Hörr** **(Germany) Leonard Weiss** **(France) Jean-Phillipe Dayrault**	**Ligier JS P320**	**MI**	**119**	**+7 Laps‡**
16	**LMP3**	**4**	**(Luxembourg) DKR Engineering**	**(Germany) Laurents Hörr** **(Germany) Leonard Weiss** **(France) Jean-Phillipe Dayrault**	**Nissan VK56DE 5.6 L V8**	**MI**	**119**	**+7 Laps‡**
17	LMP3	19	(Switzerland) Cool Racing	(Switzerland) Nicolas Maulini (United Kingdom) Matt Bell (Germany) Niklas Krütten	Ligier JS P320	**MI**	119	+7 Laps
17	LMP3	19	(Switzerland) Cool Racing	(Switzerland) Nicolas Maulini (United Kingdom) Matt Bell (Germany) Niklas Krütten	Nissan VK56DE 5.6 L V8	**MI**	119	+7 Laps
18	LMP3	2	(United Kingdom) United Autosports	(United Kingdom) Wayne Boyd (United Kingdom) Rob Wheldon (France) Edouard Cauhaupe	Ligier JS P320	**MI**	119	+7 Laps
18	LMP3	2	(United Kingdom) United Autosports	(United Kingdom) Wayne Boyd (United Kingdom) Rob Wheldon (France) Edouard Cauhaupe	Nissan VK56DE 5.6 L V8	**MI**	119	+7 Laps
19	LMP3	15	(United Kingdom) RLR MSport	(United Kingdom) Michael Benham (United Kingdom) Alex Kapadia (Denmark) Malthe Jakobsen	Ligier JS P320	**MI**	118	+8 Laps
19	LMP3	15	(United Kingdom) RLR MSport	(United Kingdom) Michael Benham (United Kingdom) Alex Kapadia (Denmark) Malthe Jakobsen	Nissan VK56DE 5.6 L V8	**MI**	118	+8 Laps
20	LMP3	7	(United Kingdom) Nielsen Racing	(United Kingdom) Anthony Wells (United Kingdom) Colin Noble	Ligier JS P320	**MI**	118	+8 Laps
20	LMP3	7	(United Kingdom) Nielsen Racing	(United Kingdom) Anthony Wells (United Kingdom) Colin Noble	Nissan VK56DE 5.6 L V8	**MI**	118	+8 Laps
21	LMP3	14	(Poland) Inter Europol Competition	(Poland) Mateusz Kaprzyk (Lithuania) Julius Adomavičius (Italy) Mattia Pasini	Ligier JS P320	**MI**	118	+8 Laps
21	LMP3	14	(Poland) Inter Europol Competition	(Poland) Mateusz Kaprzyk (Lithuania) Julius Adomavičius (Italy) Mattia Pasini	Nissan VK56DE 5.6 L V8	**MI**	118	+8 Laps
22	LMP3	8	(France) Graff Racing	(France) Eric Trouillet (Switzerland) Sébastien Page (Switzerland) David Droux	Ligier JS P320	**MI**	118	+8 Laps
22	LMP3	8	(France) Graff Racing	(France) Eric Trouillet (Switzerland) Sébastien Page (Switzerland) David Droux	Nissan VK56DE 5.6 L V8	**MI**	118	+8 Laps
23	LMP3	12	(Luxembourg) Racing Experience	(Luxembourg) David Hauser (Luxembourg) Gary Hauser (Belgium) Tom Cloet	Ligier JS P320	**MI**	118	+8 Laps
23	LMP3	12	(Luxembourg) Racing Experience	(Luxembourg) David Hauser (Luxembourg) Gary Hauser (Belgium) Tom Cloet	Nissan VK56DE 5.6 L V8	**MI**	118	+8 Laps
24	LMP3	9	(France) Graff Racing	(Liechtenstein) Matthias Kaiser (Finland) Rory Penttinen	Ligier JS P320	**MI**	118	+8 Laps
24	LMP3	9	(France) Graff Racing	(Liechtenstein) Matthias Kaiser (Finland) Rory Penttinen	Nissan VK56DE 5.6 L V8	**MI**	118	+8 Laps
25	Innovat	84	(France) Association SRT41	(Japan) Takuma Aoki (Belgium) Nigel Bailly (France) Pierre Sancinéna	Oreca 07	?	117	+9 Laps
25	Innovat	84	(France) Association SRT41	(Japan) Takuma Aoki (Belgium) Nigel Bailly (France) Pierre Sancinéna	Gibson GK428 4.2 L V8	?	117	+9 Laps
26	LMP3	11	(Italy) Eurointernational	(Italy) Andrea Domedari (Netherlands) Joey Alders (Italy) Jacopo Baratto	Ligier JS P320	**MI**	117	+9 Laps
26	LMP3	11	(Italy) Eurointernational	(Italy) Andrea Domedari (Netherlands) Joey Alders (Italy) Jacopo Baratto	Nissan VK56DE 5.6 L V8	**MI**	117	+9 Laps
27	**LMGTE**	**80**	**(Italy) Iron Lynx**	**(Italy) Matteo Cressoni** **(Italy) Rino Mastronardi** **(Spain) Miguel Molina**	**Ferrari 488 GTE Evo**	**G**	**117**	**+9 Laps‡**
27	**LMGTE**	**80**	**(Italy) Iron Lynx**	**(Italy) Matteo Cressoni** **(Italy) Rino Mastronardi** **(Spain) Miguel Molina**	**Ferrari F154CB 3.9 L Turbo V8**	**G**	**117**	**+9 Laps‡**
28	LMP3	5	(France) MV2S Racing	(France) Christophe Cresp (France) Fabien Lavergne (France) Adrien Chila	Ligier JS P320	**MI**	117	+9 Laps
28	LMP3	5	(France) MV2S Racing	(France) Christophe Cresp (France) Fabien Lavergne (France) Adrien Chila	Nissan VK56DE 5.6 L V8	**MI**	117	+9 Laps
29	LMGTE	55	(Switzerland) Spirit of Race	(United Kingdom) Duncan Cameron (Republic of Ireland) Matt Griffin (South Africa) David Perel	Ferrari 488 GTE Evo	**G**	117	+9 Laps
29	LMGTE	55	(Switzerland) Spirit of Race	(United Kingdom) Duncan Cameron (Republic of Ireland) Matt Griffin (South Africa) David Perel	Ferrari F154CB 3.9 L Turbo V8	**G**	117	+9 Laps
30	LMP3	6	(United Kingdom) Nielsen Racing	(United Kingdom) Nicholas Adcock (United States) Austin McCusker (Netherlands) Max Koebolt	Ligier JS P320	**MI**	117	+9 Laps
30	LMP3	6	(United Kingdom) Nielsen Racing	(United Kingdom) Nicholas Adcock (United States) Austin McCusker (Netherlands) Max Koebolt	Nissan VK56DE 5.6 L V8	**MI**	117	+9 Laps
31	LMGTE	88	(Italy) AF Corse	(France) Emmanuel Collard (France) François Perrodo (Italy) Alessio Rovera	Ferrari 488 GTE Evo	**G**	117	+9 Laps
31	LMGTE	88	(Italy) AF Corse	(France) Emmanuel Collard (France) François Perrodo (Italy) Alessio Rovera	Ferrari F154CB 3.9 L Turbo V8	**G**	117	+9 Laps
32	LMGTE	77	(Germany) Proton Competition	(Germany) Christian Ried (United States) Cooper MacNeil (Italy) Gianmaria Bruni	Porsche 911 RSR-19	**G**	117	+9 Laps
32	LMGTE	77	(Germany) Proton Competition	(Germany) Christian Ried (United States) Cooper MacNeil (Italy) Gianmaria Bruni	Porsche 4.2 L Flat-6	**G**	117	+9 Laps
33	LMGTE	60	(Italy) Iron Lynx	(Italy) Claudio Schiavoni (Italy) Giorgio Sernagiotto (Italy) Paolo Ruberti	Ferrari 488 GTE Evo	**G**	117	+9 Laps
33	LMGTE	60	(Italy) Iron Lynx	(Italy) Claudio Schiavoni (Italy) Giorgio Sernagiotto (Italy) Paolo Ruberti	Ferrari F154CB 3.9 L Turbo V8	**G**	117	+9 Laps
34	LMGTE	66	(United Kingdom) JMW Motorsport	(United Kingdom) Jody Fannin (Italy) Andrea Fontana (United States) Rodrigo Sales	Ferrari 488 GTE Evo	**G**	115	+11 Laps
34	LMGTE	66	(United Kingdom) JMW Motorsport	(United Kingdom) Jody Fannin (Italy) Andrea Fontana (United States) Rodrigo Sales	Ferrari F154CB 3.9 L Turbo V8	**G**	115	+11 Laps
35	LMGTE	95	(United Kingdom) TF Sport	(United Kingdom) John Hartshorne (United Kingdom) Ross Gunn (United Kingdom) Ollie Hancock	Aston Martin Vantage AMR	**G**	115	+11 Laps
35	LMGTE	95	(United Kingdom) TF Sport	(United Kingdom) John Hartshorne (United Kingdom) Ross Gunn (United Kingdom) Ollie Hancock	Aston Martin 4.0 L Turbo V8	**G**	115	+11 Laps
36	LMP3	3	(United Kingdom) United Autosports	(United States) Jim McGuire (United Kingdom) Duncan Tappy (United Kingdom) Andrew Bentley	Ligier JS P320	**MI**	113	+13 Laps
36	LMP3	3	(United Kingdom) United Autosports	(United States) Jim McGuire (United Kingdom) Duncan Tappy (United Kingdom) Andrew Bentley	Nissan VK56DE 5.6 L V8	**MI**	113	+13 Laps
37	LMGTE	93	(Germany) Proton Competition	(Republic of Ireland) Michael Fassbender (New Zealand) Jaxon Evans (Austria) Richard Lietz	Porsche 911 RSR-19	**G**	96	+30 Laps
37	LMGTE	93	(Germany) Proton Competition	(Republic of Ireland) Michael Fassbender (New Zealand) Jaxon Evans (Austria) Richard Lietz	Porsche 4.2 L Flat-6	**G**	96	+30 Laps
DNF	LMP3	20	(Poland) Team Virage	(United States) Rob Hodes (Canada) Garett Grist (United States) C. R. Crews	Ligier JS P320	**MI**	94	Did not finish
DNF	LMP3	20	(Poland) Team Virage	(United States) Rob Hodes (Canada) Garett Grist (United States) C. R. Crews	Nissan VK56DE 5.6 L V8	**MI**	94	Did not finish
DNF	LMGTE	83	(Italy) Iron Lynx	(Switzerland) Rahel Frey (Denmark) Michelle Gatting (Italy) Manuela Gostner	Ferrari 488 GTE Evo	**G**	41	Contact
DNF	LMGTE	83	(Italy) Iron Lynx	(Switzerland) Rahel Frey (Denmark) Michelle Gatting (Italy) Manuela Gostner	Ferrari F154CB 3.9 L Turbo V8	**G**	41	Contact
DNF	LMP3	13	(Poland) Inter Europol Competition	(Germany) Martin Hippe (Belgium) Ugo de Wilde (Belgium) Ulysse de Pauw	Ligier JS P320	**MI**	28	Did not finish
DNF	LMP3	13	(Poland) Inter Europol Competition	(Germany) Martin Hippe (Belgium) Ugo de Wilde (Belgium) Ulysse de Pauw	Nissan VK56DE 5.6 L V8	**MI**	28	Did not finish
DNF	LMP3	18	(Italy) 1 AIM Villorba Corse	(Italy) Alessandro Bressan (Greece) Andreas Laskaratos (Italy) Damiano Fioravanti	Ligier JS P320	**MI**	20	Did not finish
DNF	LMP3	18	(Italy) 1 AIM Villorba Corse	(Italy) Alessandro Bressan (Greece) Andreas Laskaratos (Italy) Damiano Fioravanti	Nissan VK56DE 5.6 L V8	**MI**	20	Did not finish

European Le Mans Series
Previous race: 4 Hours of Red Bull Ring	2021 season	Next race: 4 Hours of Monza
