= 2021 European Le Mans Series =

European racing series held in 2021

The 2021 European Le Mans Series was the eighteenth season of the Automobile Club de l'Ouest's (ACO) European Le Mans Series. The six-event season began at Circuit de Barcelona-Catalunya on 18 April and finished at Algarve International Circuit on 24 October.

The series was open to Le Mans Prototypes, divided into the LMP2 and LMP3 classes, and grand tourer-style racing cars in the LMGTE class.

== Calendar ==
The calendar for the 2021 season was announced on 8 October 2020. The Red Bull Ring returned to the series after a two-year absence, while Silverstone was not featured on the calendar.

| Rnd | Race | Circuit | Location | Date |
|---|---|---|---|---|
| 1 | 4 Hours of Barcelona | (Spain) Circuit de Barcelona-Catalunya | Montmeló, Spain | 18 April |
| 2 | 4 Hours of the Red Bull Ring | (Austria) Red Bull Ring | Spielberg, Austria | 16 May |
| 3 | 4 Hours of Le Castellet | (France) Circuit Paul Ricard | Le Castellet, France | 6 June (Note: The 4 Hours of Le Castellet was originally due to take place on 29 August 2021. It was rescheduled to 6 June due to the postponement of the 2021 24 Hours of Le Mans in response to the COVID-19 pandemic.) |
| 4 | 4 Hours of Monza | (Italy) Autodromo Nazionale di Monza | Monza, Italy | 11 July |
| 5 | 4 Hours of Spa-Francorchamps | (Belgium) Circuit de Spa-Francorchamps | Spa, Belgium | 19 September |
| 6 | 4 Hours of Portimão | (Portugal) Algarve International Circuit | Portimão, Portugal | 24 October |

== Entries ==
=== LMP2 ===
All cars in the LMP2 class used the Gibson GK428 V8 engine and Goodyear tyres. Entries in the LMP2 Pro-Am Cup, set aside for teams with a Bronze-rated driver in their line-up, are denoted with Icons.

| Entrant/Team | Chassis | No. | MISC | Drivers | Rounds |
|---|---|---|---|---|---|
| (France) IDEC Sport | Oreca 07 | 17 | PA | (United States) Dwight Merriman | 1–4 |
| (France) IDEC Sport | Oreca 07 | 17 | PA | (United Kingdom) Kyle Tilley | 1–4 |
| (France) IDEC Sport | Oreca 07 | 17 | PA | (United Kingdom) Ryan Dalziel | 1–2, 4 |
| (France) IDEC Sport | Oreca 07 | 17 | PA | (France) Gabriel Aubry | 3 |
| (France) IDEC Sport | Oreca 07 | 28 | P2 | (France) Paul-Loup Chatin | All |
| (France) IDEC Sport | Oreca 07 | 28 | P2 | (France) Paul Lafargue | All |
| (France) IDEC Sport | Oreca 07 | 28 | P2 | (France) Patrick Pilet | 1–2, 4–6 |
| (France) IDEC Sport | Oreca 07 | 28 | P2 | (France) Jean-Éric Vergne | 3 |
| (United States) DragonSpeed USA | Oreca 07 | 21 | PA | (United Kingdom) Ben Hanley | 1–4 |
| (United States) DragonSpeed USA | Oreca 07 | 21 | PA | (Sweden) Henrik Hedman | 1–4 |
| (United States) DragonSpeed USA | Oreca 07 | 21 | PA | (United States) Ricky Taylor | 1 |
| (United States) DragonSpeed USA | Oreca 07 | 21 | PA | (United States) Gustavo Menezes | 2–3 |
| (United States) DragonSpeed USA | Oreca 07 | 21 | PA | (Colombia) Juan Pablo Montoya | 4 |
| (United Kingdom) United Autosports | Oreca 07 | 22 | P2 | (South Africa) Jonathan Aberdein | All |
| (United Kingdom) United Autosports | Oreca 07 | 22 | P2 | (United Kingdom) Tom Gamble | All |
| (United Kingdom) United Autosports | Oreca 07 | 22 | P2 | (United Kingdom) Phil Hanson | All |
| (United Kingdom) United Autosports | Oreca 07 | 32 | P2 | (France) Nico Jamin | All |
| (United Kingdom) United Autosports | Oreca 07 | 32 | P2 | (Venezuela) Manuel Maldonado | All |
| (United Kingdom) United Autosports | Oreca 07 | 32 | P2 | (Netherlands) Job van Uitert | All |
| (Portugal) Algarve Pro Racing | Oreca 07 | 24 | P2 | (United Kingdom) Richard Bradley | All |
| (Portugal) Algarve Pro Racing | Oreca 07 | 24 | P2 | (Austria) Ferdinand Habsburg | All |
| (Portugal) Algarve Pro Racing | Oreca 07 | 24 | P2 | (Mexico) Diego Menchaca | 1–5 |
| (Portugal) Algarve Pro Racing | Oreca 07 | 24 | P2 | (Germany) Sophia Flörsch | 6 |
| (Russia) G-Drive Racing | Aurus 01 | 25 | PA | (Portugal) Rui Andrade | All |
| (Russia) G-Drive Racing | Aurus 01 | 25 | PA | (United States) John Falb | All |
| (Russia) G-Drive Racing | Aurus 01 | 25 | PA | (Brazil) Pietro Fittipaldi | 1 |
| (Russia) G-Drive Racing | Aurus 01 | 25 | PA | (Spain) Roberto Merhi | 2–4 |
| (Russia) G-Drive Racing | Aurus 01 | 25 | PA | (United States) Gustavo Menezes | 5–6 |
| (Russia) G-Drive Racing | Aurus 01 | 26 | P2 | (Argentina) Franco Colapinto | All |
| (Russia) G-Drive Racing | Aurus 01 | 26 | P2 | (Russia) Roman Rusinov | All |
| (Russia) G-Drive Racing | Aurus 01 | 26 | P2 | (Netherlands) Nyck de Vries | 1–3, 5–6 |
| (Russia) G-Drive Racing | Aurus 01 | 26 | P2 | (Denmark) Mikkel Jensen | 4 |
| (France) Ultimate | Oreca 07 | 29 | PA | (France) Jean-Baptiste Lahaye | All |
| (France) Ultimate | Oreca 07 | 29 | PA | (France) Matthieu Lahaye | All |
| (France) Ultimate | Oreca 07 | 29 | PA | (France) François Hériau | 1–4 |
| (France) Ultimate | Oreca 07 | 29 | PA | (Italy) Gianluca Giraudi | 6 |
| (France) Duqueine Team | Oreca 07 | 30 | P2 | (Austria) René Binder | All |
| (France) Duqueine Team | Oreca 07 | 30 | P2 | (France) Tristan Gommendy | All |
| (France) Duqueine Team | Oreca 07 | 30 | P2 | (Mexico) Memo Rojas | All |
| Racing Team Turkey | Oreca 07 | 34 | PA | (Republic of Ireland) Charlie Eastwood | All |
| Racing Team Turkey | Oreca 07 | 34 | PA | (Turkey) Salih Yoluç | All |
| Racing Team Turkey | Oreca 07 | 34 | PA | (United Kingdom) Harry Tincknell | 1, 3, 5–6 |
| Racing Team Turkey | Oreca 07 | 34 | PA | (United States) Logan Sargeant | 2, 4 |
| (United Kingdom) BHK Motorsport | Oreca 07 | 35 | P2 | (Italy) Sergio Campana | All |
| (United Kingdom) BHK Motorsport | Oreca 07 | 35 | P2 | (Italy) Francesco Dracone | All |
| (United Kingdom) BHK Motorsport | Oreca 07 | 35 | P2 | (Germany) Markus Pommer | All |
| (Switzerland) Cool Racing | Oreca 07 | 37 | PA | (Switzerland) Alexandre Coigny | All |
| (Switzerland) Cool Racing | Oreca 07 | 37 | PA | (France) Nicolas Lapierre | All |
| (Switzerland) Cool Racing | Oreca 07 | 37 | PA | (Switzerland) Antonin Borga | 1–4 |
| (Switzerland) Cool Racing | Oreca 07 | 37 | PA | (France) Charles Milesi | 5–6 |
| (France) Graff Racing | Oreca 07 | 39 | PA | (France) Vincent Capillaire | 1–4, 6 |
| (France) Graff Racing | Oreca 07 | 39 | PA | (France) Arnold Robin | 1–4, 6 |
| (France) Graff Racing | Oreca 07 | 39 | PA | (France) Maxime Robin | 1–4, 6 |
| (Belgium) Team WRT | Oreca 07 | 41 | P2 | (Switzerland) Louis Delétraz | All |
| (Belgium) Team WRT | Oreca 07 | 41 | P2 | (Poland) Robert Kubica | All |
| (Belgium) Team WRT | Oreca 07 | 41 | P2 | (China) Yifei Ye | All |
| (France) Panis Racing | Oreca 07 | 65 | P2 | (France) Julien Canal | All |
| (France) Panis Racing | Oreca 07 | 65 | P2 | (United Kingdom) Will Stevens | All |
| (France) Panis Racing | Oreca 07 | 65 | P2 | (France) Gabriel Aubry | 1 |
| (France) Panis Racing | Oreca 07 | 65 | P2 | (Australia) James Allen | 2–6 |
| (Switzerland) Realteam Racing | Oreca 07 | 70 | PA | (France) Loïc Duval | 4 |
| (Switzerland) Realteam Racing | Oreca 07 | 70 | PA | (Switzerland) Esteban García | 4 |
| (United Kingdom) Jota Sport | Oreca 07 | 82 | P2 | (Indonesia) Sean Gelael | 4 |
| (United Kingdom) Jota Sport | Oreca 07 | 82 | P2 | (Malaysia) Jazeman Jaafar | 4 |
| (Netherlands) Racing Team Nederland | Oreca 07 | 92 | PA | (Netherlands) Frits van Eerd | 4 |
| (Netherlands) Racing Team Nederland | Oreca 07 | 92 | PA | (Netherlands) Giedo van der Garde | 4 |

| Icon | MISC |
|---|---|
| P2 | LMP2 |
| PA | LMP2 Pro-Am Cup |

=== Innovative car ===
| Entrant/Team | Car | No. | Drivers | Rounds |
|---|---|---|---|---|
| (France) La Filière Frédéric Sausset by SRT41 | Oreca 07 | 84 | (Japan) Takuma Aoki | 1, 3 |
| (France) La Filière Frédéric Sausset by SRT41 | Oreca 07 | 84 | (Belgium) Nigel Bailly | 1, 3 |
| (France) La Filière Frédéric Sausset by SRT41 | Oreca 07 | 84 | (France) Pierre Sancinéna | 1, 3 |

=== LMP3 ===
All cars in the LMP3 class used the Nissan VK56DE 5.6L V8 engine and Michelin tyres.

| Entrant/Team | Chassis | No. | Drivers | Rounds |
|---|---|---|---|---|
| (United Kingdom) United Autosports | Ligier JS P320 | 2 | (United Kingdom) Wayne Boyd | All |
| (United Kingdom) United Autosports | Ligier JS P320 | 2 | (France) Edouard Cauhaupe | All |
| (United Kingdom) United Autosports | Ligier JS P320 | 2 | (United Kingdom) Rob Wheldon | All |
| (United Kingdom) United Autosports | Ligier JS P320 | 3 | (United Kingdom) Andrew Bentley | All |
| (United Kingdom) United Autosports | Ligier JS P320 | 3 | (United Kingdom) Duncan Tappy | All |
| (United Kingdom) United Autosports | Ligier JS P320 | 3 | (United States) Jim McGuire | All |
| (Luxembourg) DKR Engineering | Duqueine M30 - D08 | 4 | (Germany) Laurents Hörr | All |
| (Luxembourg) DKR Engineering | Duqueine M30 - D08 | 4 | (Netherlands) Alain Berg | 1 |
| (Luxembourg) DKR Engineering | Duqueine M30 - D08 | 4 | (Germany) Leonard Weiss | 2 |
| (Luxembourg) DKR Engineering | Duqueine M30 - D08 | 4 | (France) Jean-Phillipe Dayrault | 2–3 |
| (Luxembourg) DKR Engineering | Duqueine M30 - D08 | 4 | (France) Mathieu de Barbuat | 4–6 |
| (France) MV2S Racing | Ligier JS P320 | 5 | (France) Adrien Chila | All |
| (France) MV2S Racing | Ligier JS P320 | 5 | (France) Christophe Cresp | All |
| (France) MV2S Racing | Ligier JS P320 | 5 | (France) Fabien Lavergne | All |
| (United Kingdom) Nielsen Racing | Ligier JS P320 | 6 | (United Kingdom) Nicholas Adcock | All |
| (United Kingdom) Nielsen Racing | Ligier JS P320 | 6 | (Netherlands) Max Koebolt | All |
| (United Kingdom) Nielsen Racing | Ligier JS P320 | 6 | (United States) Austin McCusker | All |
| (United Kingdom) Nielsen Racing | Ligier JS P320 | 7 | (United Kingdom) Colin Noble | All |
| (United Kingdom) Nielsen Racing | Ligier JS P320 | 7 | (United Kingdom) Anthony Wells | All |
| (France) Graff Racing | Ligier JS P320 | 8 | (Switzerland) David Droux | All |
| (France) Graff Racing | Ligier JS P320 | 8 | (Switzerland) Sébastien Page | All |
| (France) Graff Racing | Ligier JS P320 | 8 | (France) Eric Trouillet | All |
| (France) Graff Racing | Ligier JS P320 | 9 | (Liechtenstein) Matthias Kaiser | All |
| (France) Graff Racing | Ligier JS P320 | 9 | (Finland) Rory Penttinen | All |
| (Italy) Eurointernational | Ligier JS P320 | 11 | (Italy) Andrea Dromedari | 1–5 |
| (Italy) Eurointernational | Ligier JS P320 | 11 | (Poland) Mateusz Kaprzyk | 1 |
| (Italy) Eurointernational | Ligier JS P320 | 11 | (Netherlands) Joey Alders | 2–5 |
| (Italy) Eurointernational | Ligier JS P320 | 11 | (Turkey) Cem Bölükbaşı | 2 |
| (Italy) Eurointernational | Ligier JS P320 | 11 | (Italy) Jacopo Baratto | 3–5 |
| (Italy) Eurointernational | Ligier JS P320 | 11 | (Italy) Mattia Drudi | 6 |
| (Italy) Eurointernational | Ligier JS P320 | 11 | (France) Antoine Doquin | 6 |
| (Italy) Eurointernational | Ligier JS P320 | 11 | (Germany) Finn Gehrsitz | 6 |
| (Luxembourg) Racing Experience | Duqueine M30 - D08 | 12 | (Belgium) Tom Cloet | All |
| (Luxembourg) Racing Experience | Duqueine M30 - D08 | 12 | (Luxembourg) Gary Hauser | All |
| (Luxembourg) Racing Experience | Duqueine M30 - D08 | 12 | (Luxembourg) David Hauser | 1–5 |
| (Luxembourg) Racing Experience | Duqueine M30 - D08 | 12 | (Portugal) Guilherme Oliveira | 6 |
| (Poland) Inter Europol Competition | Ligier JS P320 | 13 | (Germany) Martin Hippe | All |
| (Poland) Inter Europol Competition | Ligier JS P320 | 13 | (Belgium) Ugo de Wilde | All |
| (Poland) Inter Europol Competition | Ligier JS P320 | 13 | (France) Julien Falchero | 1 |
| (Poland) Inter Europol Competition | Ligier JS P320 | 13 | (Belgium) Ulysse de Pauw | 2–3 |
| (Poland) Inter Europol Competition | Ligier JS P320 | 13 | (Italy) Mattia Pasini | 4 |
| (Poland) Inter Europol Competition | Ligier JS P320 | 13 | (Australia) Aidan Read | 5 |
| (Poland) Inter Europol Competition | Ligier JS P320 | 13 | (France) Adam Eteki | 6 |
| (Poland) Inter Europol Competition | Ligier JS P320 | 14 | (Lithuania) Julius Adomavičius | 1, 3 |
| (Poland) Inter Europol Competition | Ligier JS P320 | 14 | (Italy) Mattia Pasini | 1–3, 5 |
| (Poland) Inter Europol Competition | Ligier JS P320 | 14 | (Italy) Alessandro Bracalente | 1 |
| (Poland) Inter Europol Competition | Ligier JS P320 | 14 | (Poland) Mateusz Kaprzyk | 2–6 |
| (Poland) Inter Europol Competition | Ligier JS P320 | 14 | (Lithuania) Gustas Grinbergas | 2 |
| (Poland) Inter Europol Competition | Ligier JS P320 | 14 | (France) Erwin Creed | 4 |
| (Poland) Inter Europol Competition | Ligier JS P320 | 14 | (Germany) Marius Zug | 4 |
| (Poland) Inter Europol Competition | Ligier JS P320 | 14 | (Chile) Nico Pino | 5–6 |
| (Poland) Inter Europol Competition | Ligier JS P320 | 14 | (Poland) Patryk Krupiński | 6 |
| (United Kingdom) RLR MSport | Ligier JS P320 | 15 | (United Kingdom) Mike Benham | All |
| (United Kingdom) RLR MSport | Ligier JS P320 | 15 | (Denmark) Malthe Jakobsen | All |
| (United Kingdom) RLR MSport | Ligier JS P320 | 15 | (United Kingdom) Alex Kapadia | All |
| (Italy) 1 AIM Villorba Corse | Ligier JS P320 | 18 | (Italy) Alessandro Bressan | All |
| (Italy) 1 AIM Villorba Corse | Ligier JS P320 | 18 | (Italy) Damiano Fioravanti | All |
| (Italy) 1 AIM Villorba Corse | Ligier JS P320 | 18 | (Greece) Andreas Laskaratos | All |
| (Switzerland) Cool Racing | Ligier JS P320 | 19 | (United Kingdom) Matthew Bell | All |
| (Switzerland) Cool Racing | Ligier JS P320 | 19 | (Germany) Niklas Krütten | All |
| (Switzerland) Cool Racing | Ligier JS P320 | 19 | (France) Nicolas Maulini | All |
| (Poland) Team Virage | Ligier JS P320 | 20 | (United States) Rob Hodes | All |
| (Poland) Team Virage | Ligier JS P320 | 20 | (United States) Charles Crews | 1–5 |
| (Poland) Team Virage | Ligier JS P320 | 20 | (Canada) Garett Grist | 1–5 |
| (Poland) Team Virage | Ligier JS P320 | 20 | (Switzerland) Alex Fontana | 6 |
| (Poland) Team Virage | Ligier JS P320 | 20 | (Algeria) Julien Gerbi | 6 |
| (France) Saintéloc Junior Team | Ligier JS P320 | 42 | (France) Fabien Michal | 6 |
| (France) Saintéloc Junior Team | Ligier JS P320 | 42 | (Switzerland) Lucas Légeret | 6 |

=== LMGTE ===
All cars in the LMGTE class use Goodyear tyres.

| Entrant/Team | Chassis | Engine | No. | Drivers | Rounds |
|---|---|---|---|---|---|
| (Switzerland) Spirit of Race | Ferrari 488 GTE Evo | Ferrari F154CB 4.0 L Turbo V8 | 55 | (United Kingdom) Duncan Cameron | All |
| (Switzerland) Spirit of Race | Ferrari 488 GTE Evo | Ferrari F154CB 4.0 L Turbo V8 | 55 | (South Africa) David Perel | All |
| (Switzerland) Spirit of Race | Ferrari 488 GTE Evo | Ferrari F154CB 4.0 L Turbo V8 | 55 | (Republic of Ireland) Matt Griffin | 1–3, 5–6 |
| (Switzerland) Spirit of Race | Ferrari 488 GTE Evo | Ferrari F154CB 4.0 L Turbo V8 | 55 | (Italy) Alessandro Pier Guidi | 4 |
| (Italy) Iron Lynx | Ferrari 488 GTE Evo | Ferrari F154CB 4.0 L Turbo V8 | 60 | (Italy) Paolo Ruberti | All |
| (Italy) Iron Lynx | Ferrari 488 GTE Evo | Ferrari F154CB 4.0 L Turbo V8 | 60 | (Italy) Claudio Schiavoni | All |
| (Italy) Iron Lynx | Ferrari 488 GTE Evo | Ferrari F154CB 4.0 L Turbo V8 | 60 | (Italy) Giorgio Sernagiotto | All |
| (Italy) Iron Lynx | Ferrari 488 GTE Evo | Ferrari F154CB 4.0 L Turbo V8 | 80 | (Italy) Matteo Cressoni | All |
| (Italy) Iron Lynx | Ferrari 488 GTE Evo | Ferrari F154CB 4.0 L Turbo V8 | 80 | (Italy) Rino Mastronardi | All |
| (Italy) Iron Lynx | Ferrari 488 GTE Evo | Ferrari F154CB 4.0 L Turbo V8 | 80 | (Spain) Miguel Molina | All |
| (Italy) Iron Lynx | Ferrari 488 GTE Evo | Ferrari F154CB 4.0 L Turbo V8 | 83 | (Switzerland) Rahel Frey | All |
| (Italy) Iron Lynx | Ferrari 488 GTE Evo | Ferrari F154CB 4.0 L Turbo V8 | 83 | (Denmark) Michelle Gatting | All |
| (Italy) Iron Lynx | Ferrari 488 GTE Evo | Ferrari F154CB 4.0 L Turbo V8 | 83 | (Italy) Manuela Gostner | 1–4 |
| (Italy) Iron Lynx | Ferrari 488 GTE Evo | Ferrari F154CB 4.0 L Turbo V8 | 83 | (Belgium) Sarah Bovy | 5–6 |
| (Italy) AF Corse | Ferrari 488 GTE Evo | Ferrari F154CB 4.0 L Turbo V8 | 61 | (France) Franck Dezoteux | 6 |
| (Italy) AF Corse | Ferrari 488 GTE Evo | Ferrari F154CB 4.0 L Turbo V8 | 61 | (France) Pierre Ragues | 6 |
| (Italy) AF Corse | Ferrari 488 GTE Evo | Ferrari F154CB 4.0 L Turbo V8 | 61 | (France) Côme Ledogar | 6 |
| (Italy) AF Corse | Ferrari 488 GTE Evo | Ferrari F154CB 4.0 L Turbo V8 | 88 | (France) Emmanuel Collard | 2–6 |
| (Italy) AF Corse | Ferrari 488 GTE Evo | Ferrari F154CB 4.0 L Turbo V8 | 88 | (France) François Perrodo | 2–6 |
| (Italy) AF Corse | Ferrari 488 GTE Evo | Ferrari F154CB 4.0 L Turbo V8 | 88 | (Italy) Alessio Rovera | 2–6 |
| (United Kingdom) JMW Motorsport | Ferrari 488 GTE Evo | Ferrari F154CB 4.0 L Turbo V8 | 66 | (United Kingdom) Jody Fannin | All |
| (United Kingdom) JMW Motorsport | Ferrari 488 GTE Evo | Ferrari F154CB 4.0 L Turbo V8 | 66 | (United States) Rodrigo Sales | All |
| (United Kingdom) JMW Motorsport | Ferrari 488 GTE Evo | Ferrari F154CB 4.0 L Turbo V8 | 66 | (Italy) Andrea Fontana | 1–5 |
| (United Kingdom) JMW Motorsport | Ferrari 488 GTE Evo | Ferrari F154CB 4.0 L Turbo V8 | 66 | (Hong Kong) Shaun Thong | 6 |
| (United States) WeatherTech Racing | Porsche 911 RSR-19 | Porsche M97/80 4.2 L Flat-6 | 77 | (Germany) Christian Ried | All |
| (United States) WeatherTech Racing | Porsche 911 RSR-19 | Porsche M97/80 4.2 L Flat-6 | 77 | (Italy) Gianmaria Bruni | 1, 3–4, 6 |
| (United States) WeatherTech Racing | Porsche 911 RSR-19 | Porsche M97/80 4.2 L Flat-6 | 77 | (New Zealand) Jaxon Evans | 1 |
| (United States) WeatherTech Racing | Porsche 911 RSR-19 | Porsche M97/80 4.2 L Flat-6 | 77 | (United States) Cooper MacNeil | 2–6 |
| (United States) WeatherTech Racing | Porsche 911 RSR-19 | Porsche M97/80 4.2 L Flat-6 | 77 | (Australia) Matt Campbell | 2, 5 |
| (Germany) Proton Competition | Porsche 911 RSR-19 | Porsche M97/80 4.2 L Flat-6 | 93 | (Republic of Ireland) Michael Fassbender | All |
| (Germany) Proton Competition | Porsche 911 RSR-19 | Porsche M97/80 4.2 L Flat-6 | 93 | (Austria) Richard Lietz | All |
| (Germany) Proton Competition | Porsche 911 RSR-19 | Porsche M97/80 4.2 L Flat-6 | 93 | (Germany) Felipe Fernández Laser | 1–2, 4–6 |
| (Germany) Proton Competition | Porsche 911 RSR-19 | Porsche M97/80 4.2 L Flat-6 | 93 | (New Zealand) Jaxon Evans | 3 |
| (United Kingdom) TF Sport | Aston Martin Vantage AMR | Aston Martin M177 4.0 L Turbo V8 | 95 | (United Kingdom) Ollie Hancock | All |
| (United Kingdom) TF Sport | Aston Martin Vantage AMR | Aston Martin M177 4.0 L Turbo V8 | 95 | (United Kingdom) John Hartshorne | All |
| (United Kingdom) TF Sport | Aston Martin Vantage AMR | Aston Martin M177 4.0 L Turbo V8 | 95 | (United Kingdom) Ross Gunn | 1, 3–6 |
| (United Kingdom) TF Sport | Aston Martin Vantage AMR | Aston Martin M177 4.0 L Turbo V8 | 95 | (United Kingdom) Jonathan Adam | 2 |

== Results and standings ==
=== Race results ===
Bold indicates overall winner.

| Rnd. | Circuit | Pole | LMP2 Winning Team | LMP2 Pro-Am Winning Team | LMP3 Winning Team | LMGTE Winning Team | Results |
| Rnd. | Circuit | Pole | LMP2 Winning Drivers | LMP2 Pro-Am Winning Drivers | LMP3 Winning Drivers | LMGTE Winning Drivers | Results |
|---|---|---|---|---|---|---|---|
| 1 | (Spain) Catalunya | (Russia) No. 26 G-Drive Racing | **(Belgium) No. 41 Team WRT** | (France) No. 29 Ultimate | (Switzerland) No. 19 Cool Racing | (Italy) No. 80 Iron Lynx | Report |
| 1 | (Spain) Catalunya | (Argentina) Franco Colapinto (Russia) Roman Rusinov (Netherlands) Nyck de Vries | **(Switzerland) Louis Delétraz** **(Poland) Robert Kubica** **(China) Yifei Ye** | (France) François Hériau (France) Jean-Baptiste Lahaye (France) Matthieu Lahaye | (United Kingdom) Matthew Bell (Germany) Niklas Krütten (France) Nicolas Maulini | (Italy) Matteo Cressoni (Italy) Rino Mastronardi (Spain) Miguel Molina | Report |
| 2 | (Austria) Red Bull Ring | No. 34 Racing Team Turkey | **(Belgium) No. 41 Team WRT** | (Russia) No. 25 G-Drive Racing | (Switzerland) No. 19 Cool Racing | (Italy) No. 88 AF Corse | Report |
| 2 | (Austria) Red Bull Ring | (Republic of Ireland) Charlie Eastwood (United States) Logan Sargeant (Turkey) Salih Yoluç | **(Switzerland) Louis Delétraz** **(Poland) Robert Kubica** **(China) Yifei Ye** | (Portugal) Rui Andrade (United States) John Falb (Spain) Roberto Merhi | (United Kingdom) Matthew Bell (Germany) Niklas Krütten (France) Nicolas Maulini | (France) Emmanuel Collard (France) François Perrodo (Italy) Alessio Rovera | Report |
| 3 | (France) Le Castellet | (Russia) No. 26 G-Drive Racing | **(Russia) No. 26 G-Drive Racing** | No. 34 Racing Team Turkey | (Luxembourg) No. 4 DKR Engineering | (Italy) No. 80 Iron Lynx | Report |
| 3 | (France) Le Castellet | (Argentina) Franco Colapinto (Russia) Roman Rusinov (Netherlands) Nyck de Vries | **(Argentina) Franco Colapinto** **(Russia) Roman Rusinov** **(Netherlands) Nyck de Vries** | (Republic of Ireland) Charlie Eastwood (United Kingdom) Harry Tincknell (Turkey) Salih Yoluç | (France) Mathieu de Barbuat (Germany) Laurents Hörr | (Italy) Matteo Cressoni (Italy) Rino Mastronardi (Spain) Miguel Molina | Report |
| 4 | (Italy) Monza | (Russia) No. 26 G-Drive Racing | **(France) No. 65 Panis Racing** | (Russia) No. 25 G-Drive Racing | (Luxembourg) No. 4 DKR Engineering | (Switzerland) No. 55 Spirit of Race | Report |
| 4 | (Italy) Monza | (Argentina) Franco Colapinto (Russia) Roman Rusinov (Denmark) Mikkel Jensen | **(New Zealand) James Allen** **(France) Julien Canal** **(United Kingdom) Will Stevens** | (Portugal) Rui Andrade (United States) John Falb (Spain) Roberto Merhi | (France) Mathieu de Barbuat (Germany) Laurents Hörr | (United Kingdom) Duncan Cameron (Italy) Alessandro Pier Guidi (South Africa) David Perel | Report |
| 5 | (Belgium) Spa-Francorchamps | (Switzerland) No. 37 Cool Racing | **(Belgium) No. 41 Team WRT** | (Switzerland) No. 37 Cool Racing | (Luxembourg) No. 4 DKR Engineering | (Italy) No. 88 AF Corse | Report |
| 5 | (Belgium) Spa-Francorchamps | (Switzerland) Alexandre Coigny (France) Nicolas Lapierre (France) Charles Milesi | **(Switzerland) Louis Delétraz** **(Poland) Robert Kubica** **(China) Yifei Ye** | (Switzerland) Alexandre Coigny (France) Nicolas Lapierre (France) Charles Milesi | (France) Mathieu de Barbuat (Germany) Laurents Hörr | (France) Emmanuel Collard (France) François Perrodo (Italy) Alessio Rovera | Report |
| 6 | (Portugal) Portimão | (Switzerland) No. 37 Cool Racing | **(United Kingdom) No. 22 United Autosports** | (Switzerland) No. 37 Cool Racing | (Poland) No. 13 Inter Europol Competition | (Italy) No. 80 Iron Lynx | Report |
| 6 | (Portugal) Portimão | (Switzerland) Alexandre Coigny (France) Nicolas Lapierre (France) Charles Milesi | **(South Africa) Jonathan Aberdein** **(United Kingdom) Tom Gamble** **(United Kingdom) Phil Hanson** | (Switzerland) Alexandre Coigny (France) Nicolas Lapierre (France) Charles Milesi | (France) Adam Eteki (Germany) Martin Hippe (Belgium) Ugo de Wilde | (Italy) Matteo Cressoni (Italy) Rino Mastronardi (Spain) Miguel Molina | Report |

== Season report ==
=== Barcelona ===
The No. 26 G-Drive Racing entry, driven by Nyck de Vries, took pole for the first round at Barcelona. At the start, Roman Rusinov backed up the pack, for which he later received a drive-through penalty. Rusinov was passed by the No. 41 Team WRT of Louis Delétraz during the opening hour, after which Delétraz, as well as teammates Yifei Ye and Robert Kubica extended the lead gap to give WRT a win on debut. Thanks to a slow stop for the No. 22 United Autosports crew, the No. 65 Panis Racing entry inherited second, with the No. 22 placing third. The Pro-Am subclass, newly introduced in 2021, was won by the No. 35 Ultimate ran by Tech 1 Racing.

In LMP3, a pass on the No. 4 DKR Engineering Duqueine of Alain Berg earned Matt Bell victory in the No. 19 Cool Racing Ligier, while a late charge from Malthe Jakobsen earned RLR MSport's No. 15 second place ahead of the No. 13 Inter Europol Competition entry. The No. 80 Iron Lynx Ferrari won in LMGTE, while Jaxon Evans in the No. 77 Proton Competition Porsche held off David Perel's No. 55 Spirit of Race Ferrari for second.

=== Spielberg ===
At the Red Bull Ring, LMP2 rookie Logan Sargeant took pole for the No. 34 Racing Team Turkey. Heavy rain fell in the second half of the race, as the No. 41 WRT of Kubica pitted for wet-weather tyres while dominant leaders G-Drive chose to put on new intermediates — they then lost first place when the rain intensified during a subsequent safety car. The No. 26 switched back to intermediates before the restart, retaking the lead with only a fuel stop needed during the final hour. WRT's Delétraz, now on fresh intermediate tyres, passed Franco Colapinto after a multi-lap battle and went on to win by 21 seconds over the No. 26. Third went to the Pro-Am subclass-winning No. 25 G-Drive car, in which bronze-ranked John Falb had defended the overall lead against several pro drivers for 15 minutes during the first hour. Despite receiving a drive-through penalty for overtaking off track, the No. 25 recovered to third in the final hour thanks to a combative stint from Roberto Merhi.

The No. 8 Graff of David Droux took the LMP3 lead with eight minutes to go, but received a drive-through penalty for a pit stop infringement and dropped to third. This left the No. 19 Cool Racing entry of Matt Bell, who struggled for grip in the closing laps, to hold on to a narrow victory ahead of the No. 11 Eurointernational of Joey Alders. LMGTE was controlled by the Ferraris, with the No. 88 AF Corse crew winning ahead of the No. 55 Spirit of Race and No. 80 Iron Lynx.

=== Le Castellet ===
In Le Castellet, de Vries took pole for G-Drive for the second time in 2021. Despite Rusinov being passed by Ye at the start, G-Drive jumped ahead of Team WRT at the penultimate pit stop. Thereafter, de Vries passed the leading No. 32 United of Job van Uitert to take the win. The No. 22 United finished second after a pair of overtakes from Gamble on Delétraz and van Uitert, with the latter completing the podium and the former falling to fifth with a stop that came just before a full-course caution allowed his rivals to lose less time in the pits. Racing Team Turkey won the LMP2 Pro-Am subclass.

LMP3 was won by the No. 4 DKR after a strong run by Laurents Hörr, who beat championship leaders Cool Racing and the No. 2 United, which had led early on at the hands of Rob Wheldon before being forced to pit for emergency service under a badly-timed safety car. The No. 80 Iron Lynx led by Ferrari factory driver Miguel Molina claimed its second triumph in LMGTE, as fellow Ferrari entrants Spirit of Race and AF Corse completed the podium.

=== Monza ===
G-Drive Racing took pole once again at Monza, though this time at the hands of the 18-year-old Colapinto. After a well-timed stop before a caution period, the United No. 22 and Panis No. 65 crystallised themselves as the favourites. When Panis's James Allen emerged ahead of United's Jonathan Aberdein following another caution period, the No. 65 was able to drive out a commanding gap, which Will Stevens consolidated to achieve a maiden ELMS victory for Panis Racing. The No. 22 finished second, as the guest entry No. 28 of Jota Sport placed third ahead of standings leaders Team WRT. In LMP2 Pro-Am, the No. 25 G-Drive of Merhi beat the No. 34 Racing Team Turkey car of Charlie Eastwood to subclass honours.

The No. 4 DKR Engineering lineup of Hörr and Mathieu de Barbuat won the LMP3 class again, beating the Wayne Boyd-led No. 2 United and No. 13 Inter Europol. The No. 55 Spirit of Race crew, which saw Alessandro Pier Guidi replacing regular pro Matt Griffin, whose father had died earlier during the week, took victory in a close battle between David Perel and No. 80's Molina.

=== Spa-Francorchamps ===
In a crash-strewn qualifying session, the No. 37 Cool Racing car of rookie Charles Milesi came out on top. While the No. 37 won in Pro-Am, a commanding drive earned the No. 41 Team WRT outfit their third victory of the season and the LMP2 title. The Duqueine Team No. 30 placed second ahead of Panis's No. 65.

Having passed Niklas Krütten for the LMP3 lead at the start of the third hour, the No. 4 DKR of Hörr secured its third win in succession, as a sturdy defense from Matt Bell earned Cool Racing second place ahead of the chasing No. 2 United. LMGTE honours went the way of AF Corse's No. 88, which finished 25 seconds ahead of the No. 80 Iron Lynx, as the all-female No. 83 Iron Lynx crew finished third.

=== Portimão ===
Milesi took pole again for the season finale at Portimão. The race was red-flagged during the first hour after a crash involving the spinning No. 30 Duqueine (which had lost a wheel exiting the final corner) and the No. 18 1 AIM Villorba Corse LMP3 of Andreas Laskaratos, who hit the end of the pit wall head-on while trying to avoid the Duqueine — both drivers were unharmed. Afterwards, a four-car fight for the win broke out between both United LMP2s, the title-winning WRT crew, and the No. 24 Algarve Pro Racing entry; the No. 32 ended up dropping out of the fight due to a puncture and a collision between van Uitert and the BHK Motorsport No. 35. The No. 22 ended up winning after closing driver Gamble emerged ahead of Delétraz by taking fuel only at the final pit stop, holding off fresher-tyred Delétraz during the last stint. Delétraz was later caught by the No. 24, which ended up third after standout stints from Ferdinand Habsburg and substitute driver Sophia Flörsch. The No. 37 Cool Racing crew won again in Pro-Am, although the title went to the full-time duo of the No. 25 G-Drive Racing outfit, John Falb and Rui Andrade.

A fourth victory in a row looked to have clinched the LMP3 title for DKR Engineering and full-season driver Laurents Hörr, though a post-race penalty demoted the team to fourth — they ended up one point ahead of the Cool Racing lineup, which also received a penalty. The race was instead won by the No. 13 Inter Europol, with the No. 2 United and No. 9 Graff cars completing the rostrum. The No. 80 Iron Lynx crew of Molina, Matteo Cressoni, and Rino Mastronardi won the race and claimed a dominant LMGTE title, as fellow title contenders AF Corse were set back with two drive-through penalties. This setback allowed the No. 55 Spirit of Race squad, which placed fourth in the race, to clinch an automatic 2022 24 Hours of Le Mans invite by finishing second in the standings. Molina fended off the Proton Porsche of Felipe Fernández Laser in the final stint, while the No. 83 Iron Lynx team finished third again.

== Drivers' Championships ==
Points are awarded according to the following structure:

| Position | **1st** | **2nd** | **3rd** | **4th** | **5th** | **6th** | **7th** | **8th** | **9th** | **10th** | **Other** | **Pole** |
| Points | 25 | 18 | 15 | 12 | 10 | 8 | 6 | 4 | 2 | 1 | 0.5 | 1 |

=== LMP2 Drivers Championship ===
| Pos. | Driver | Team | CAT (Spain) | RBR (Austria) | LEC (France) | MNZ (Italy) | SPA (Belgium) | POR (Portugal) | Points |
|---|---|---|---|---|---|---|---|---|---|
| 1 | (Switzerland) Louis Delétraz | (Belgium) Team WRT | 1 | 1 | 5 | 4 | 1 | 2 | 118 |
| 1 | (Poland) Robert Kubica | (Belgium) Team WRT | 1 | 1 | 5 | 4 | 1 | 2 | 118 |
| 1 | (China) Yifei Ye | (Belgium) Team WRT | 1 | 1 | 5 | 4 | 1 | 2 | 118 |
| 2 | (South Africa) Jonathan Aberdein | (United Kingdom) United Autosports | 3 | 7 | 2 | 2 | 8 | 1 | 86 |
| 2 | (United Kingdom) Tom Gamble | (United Kingdom) United Autosports | 3 | 7 | 2 | 2 | 8 | 1 | 86 |
| 2 | (United Kingdom) Phil Hanson | (United Kingdom) United Autosports | 3 | 7 | 2 | 2 | 8 | 1 | 86 |
| 3 | (France) Julien Canal | (France) Panis Racing | 2 | 14 | 8 | 1 | 3 | 4 | 74.5 |
| 3 | (United Kingdom) Will Stevens | (France) Panis Racing | 2 | 14 | 8 | 1 | 3 | 4 | 74.5 |
| 4 | (Argentina) Franco Colapinto | (Russia) G-Drive Racing | **4** | 2 | **1** | **8** | NC | 5 | 74 |
| 4 | (Russia) Roman Rusinov | (Russia) G-Drive Racing | **4** | 2 | **1** | **8** | NC | 5 | 74 |
| 5 | (Netherlands) Nyck de Vries | (Russia) G-Drive Racing | **4** | 2 | **1** | | NC | 5 | 69 |
| 6 | (Australia) James Allen | (France) Panis Racing | | 14 | 8 | 1 | 3 | 4 | 56.5 |
| 7 | (Austria) René Binder | (France) Duqueine Team | 6 | 9 | 4 | 5 | 2 | NC | 52 |
| 7 | (France) Tristan Gommendy | (France) Duqueine Team | 6 | 9 | 4 | 5 | 2 | NC | 52 |
| 7 | (Mexico) Memo Rojas | (France) Duqueine Team | 6 | 9 | 4 | 5 | 2 | NC | 52 |
| 8 | (Portugal) Rui Andrade | (Russia) G-Drive Racing | 7 | 3 | 10 | 6 | 7 | 8 | 42 |
| 8 | (United States) John Falb | (Russia) G-Drive Racing | 7 | 3 | 10 | 6 | 7 | 8 | 42 |
| 9 | (France) Paul-Loup Chatin | (France) IDEC Sport | 8 | 6 | 9 | 9 | 6 | 6 | 32 |
| 9 | (France) Paul Lafargue | (France) IDEC Sport | 8 | 6 | 9 | 9 | 6 | 6 | 32 |
| 10 | (France) Patrick Pilet | (France) IDEC Sport | 8 | 6 | | 9 | 6 | 6 | 30 |
| 11 | (Republic of Ireland) Charlie Eastwood | Racing Team Turkey | 15 | **4** | 6 | 7 | NC | WD | 29.5 |
| 11 | (Turkey) Salih Yoluç | Racing Team Turkey | 15 | **4** | 6 | 7 | NC | WD | 29.5 |
| 12 | (France) Nico Jamin | (United Kingdom) United Autosports | 9 | 16 | 3 | WD | 5 | 10 | 28.5 |
| 12 | (Venezuela) Manuel Maldonado | (United Kingdom) United Autosports | 9 | 16 | 3 | WD | 5 | 10 | 28.5 |
| 12 | (Netherlands) Job van Uitert | (United Kingdom) United Autosports | 9 | 16 | 3 | WD | 5 | 10 | 28.5 |
| 13 | (United Kingdom) Richard Bradley | (Portugal) Algarve Pro Racing | 11 | 8 | 7 | 10 | NC | 3 | 27.5 |
| 13 | (Austria) Ferdinand Habsburg | (Portugal) Algarve Pro Racing | 11 | 8 | 7 | 10 | NC | 3 | 27.5 |
| 14 | (Spain) Roberto Merhi | (Russia) G-Drive Racing | | 3 | 10 | 6 | | | 26 |
| 15 | (Switzerland) Alexandre Coigny | (Switzerland) Cool Racing | 10 | 10 | 12 | 12 | **4** | **6** | 25 |
| 15 | (France) Nicolas Lapierre | (Switzerland) Cool Racing | 10 | 10 | 12 | 12 | **4** | **6** | 25 |
| 16 | (France) Jean-Baptiste Lahaye | (France) Ultimate | 5 | 5 | 13 | 11 | 10 | 11 | 23 |
| 16 | (France) Matthieu Lahaye | (France) Ultimate | 5 | 5 | 13 | 11 | 10 | 11 | 23 |
| 17 | (France) Charles Milesi | (Switzerland) Cool Racing | | | | | **4** | **6** | 22 |
| 18 | (France) François Hériau | (France) Ultimate | 5 | 5 | 13 | 11 | | | 21.5 |
| 19 | (United States) Logan Sargeant | Racing Team Turkey | | **4** | | 7 | | | 21 |
| 20 | (France) Gabriel Aubry | (France) Panis Racing | 2 | | | | | | 18.5 |
| 20 | (France) Gabriel Aubry | (France) IDEC Sport | | | 15 | | | | 18.5 |
| 21 | (Germany) Sophia Flörsch | (Portugal) Algarve Pro Racing | | | | | | 3 | 15 |
| 22 | (Mexico) Diego Menchaca | (Portugal) Algarve Pro Racing | 11 | 8 | 7 | 10 | NC | | 12.5 |
| 23 | (United States) Gustavo Menezes | (United States) DragonSpeed USA | | 12 | | | | | 10.5 |
| 23 | (United States) Gustavo Menezes | (Russia) G-Drive Racing | | | | | 7 | 8 | 10.5 |
| 24 | (United Kingdom) Harry Tincknell | Racing Team Turkey | 15 | | 6 | | NC | WD | 8.5 |
| 25 | (Denmark) Mikkel Jensen | (Russia) G-Drive Racing | | | | **8** | | | 7 |
| 26 | (Brazil) Pietro Fittipaldi | (Russia) G-Drive Racing | 7 | | | | | | 6 |
| 27 | (Italy) Sergio Campana | (United Kingdom) BHK Motorsport | 13 | 15 | 11 | 18 | 9 | 9 | 6 |
| 27 | (Italy) Francesco Dracone | (United Kingdom) BHK Motorsport | 13 | 15 | 11 | 18 | 9 | 9 | 6 |
| 27 | (Germany) Markus Pommer | (United Kingdom) BHK Motorsport | 13 | 15 | 11 | 18 | 9 | 9 | 6 |
| 28 | (Switzerland) Antonin Borga | (Switzerland) Cool Racing | 10 | 10 | 12 | 12 | | | 3 |
| 29 | (France) Vincent Capillaire | (France) Graff Racing | 14 | 13 | 14 | 16 | | 12 | 2.5 |
| 29 | (France) Arnold Robin | (France) Graff Racing | 14 | 13 | 14 | 16 | | 12 | 2.5 |
| 29 | (France) Maxime Robin | (France) Graff Racing | 14 | 13 | 14 | 16 | | 12 | 2.5 |
| 30 | (France) Jean-Éric Vergne | (France) IDEC Sport | | | 9 | | | | 2 |
| 31 | (United States) Dwight Merriman | (France) IDEC Sport | 12 | 11 | 15 | 15 | | | 2 |
| 31 | (United Kingdom) Kyle Tilley | (France) IDEC Sport | 12 | 11 | 15 | 15 | | | 2 |
| 32 | (United Kingdom) Ryan Dalziel | (France) IDEC Sport | 12 | 11 | | 15 | | | 1.5 |
| 33 | (United Kingdom) Ben Hanley | (United States) DragonSpeed USA | NC | 12 | NC | 17 | | | 1 |
| 33 | (Sweden) Henrik Hedman | (United States) DragonSpeed USA | NC | 12 | NC | 17 | | | 1 |
| 34 | (Italy) Gianluca Giraudi | (France) Ultimate | | | | | | 11 | 0.5 |
| 35 | (Colombia) Juan Pablo Montoya | (United States) DragonSpeed USA | | | | 17 | | | 0.5 |
| NC | (United States) Ricky Taylor | (United States) DragonSpeed USA | NC | | | | | | 0 |
Entries ineligible to score points
| — | (Indonesia) Sean Gelael | (United Kingdom) Jota Sport | | | | 3 | | | — |
| — | (Malaysia) Jazeman Jaafar | (United Kingdom) Jota Sport | | | | 3 | | | — |
| — | (Netherlands) Frits van Eerd | (Netherlands) Racing Team Nederland | | | | 13 | | | — |
| — | (Netherlands) Giedo van der Garde | (Netherlands) Racing Team Nederland | | | | 13 | | | — |
| — | (France) Loïc Duval | (Switzerland) Realteam Racing | | | | 14 | | | — |
| — | (Switzerland) Esteban García | (Switzerland) Realteam Racing | | | | 14 | | | — |
| Pos. | Driver | Team | CAT (Spain) | RBR (Austria) | LEC (France) | MNZ (Italy) | SPA (Belgium) | POR (Portugal) | Points |

Key
| Colour | Result |
|---|---|
| Gold | Race winner |
| Silver | 2nd place |
| Bronze | 3rd place |
| Green | Points finish |
| Blue | Non-points finish |
| Blue | Non-classified finish (NC) |
| Purple | Did not finish (Ret) |
| Black | Disqualified (DSQ) |
| Black | Excluded (EX) |
| White | Did not start (DNS) |
| White | Race cancelled (C) |
| White | Withdrew (WD) |
| Blank | Did not participate |

**Bold** – Pole

Italics – Fastest Lap

=== LMP2 Pro-Am Drivers Championship ===
| Pos. | Driver | Team | CAT (Spain) | RBR (Austria) | LEC (France) | MNZ (Italy) | SPA (Belgium) | POR (Portugal) | Points |
|---|---|---|---|---|---|---|---|---|---|
| 1 | (Portugal) Rui Andrade | (Russia) G-Drive Racing | 2 | 1 | 2 | 1 | 2 | 2 | 122 |
| 1 | (United States) John Falb | (Russia) G-Drive Racing | 2 | 1 | 2 | 1 | 2 | 2 | 122 |
| 2 | (Switzerland) Alexandre Coigny | (Switzerland) Cool Racing | 3 | 4 | 3 | 4 | **1** | **1** | 106 |
| 2 | (France) Nicolas Lapierre | (Switzerland) Cool Racing | 3 | 4 | 3 | 4 | **1** | **1** | 106 |
| 3 | (France) Jean-Baptiste Lahaye | (France) Ultimate | 1 | 3 | 4 | 3 | 10 | 3 | 82 |
| 3 | (France) Matthieu Lahaye | (France) Ultimate | 1 | 3 | 4 | 3 | 10 | 3 | 82 |
| 4 | (Republic of Ireland) Charlie Eastwood | Racing Team Turkey | 6 | **2** | 1 | 2 | NC | WD | 70 |
| 4 | (Turkey) Salih Yoluç | Racing Team Turkey | 6 | **2** | 1 | 2 | NC | WD | 70 |
| 5 | (Spain) Roberto Merhi | (Russia) G-Drive Racing | | 1 | 2 | 1 | | | 68 |
| 6 | (France) François Hériau | (France) Ultimate | 1 | 3 | 4 | 3 | | | 67 |
| 7 | (Switzerland) Antonin Borga | (Switzerland) Cool Racing | 3 | 4 | 3 | 4 | | | 54 |
| 8 | (France) Charles Milesi | (Switzerland) Cool Racing | | | | | **1** | **1** | 52 |
| 9 | (France) Vincent Capillaire | (France) Graff Racing | 5 | 7 | 5 | 8 | | 4 | 46 |
| 9 | (France) Arnold Robin | (France) Graff Racing | 5 | 7 | 5 | 8 | | 4 | 46 |
| 9 | (France) Maxime Robin | (France) Graff Racing | 5 | 7 | 5 | 8 | | 4 | 46 |
| 10 | (United States) Gustavo Menezes | (United States) DragonSpeed USA | | 6 | | | | | 44 |
| 10 | (United States) Gustavo Menezes | (Russia) G-Drive Racing | | | | | 2 | 2 | 44 |
| 11 | (United States) Dwight Merriman | (France) IDEC Sport | 4 | 5 | 6 | 7 | | | 40 |
| 11 | (United Kingdom) Kyle Tilley | (France) IDEC Sport | 4 | 5 | 6 | 7 | | | 40 |
| 12 | (United States) Logan Sargeant | Racing Team Turkey | | **2** | | 2 | | | 37 |
| 13 | (United Kingdom) Harry Tincknell | Racing Team Turkey | 6 | | 1 | | NC | WD | 33 |
| 14 | (United Kingdom) Ryan Dalziel | (France) IDEC Sport | 4 | 5 | | 7 | | | 32 |
| 15 | (Brazil) Pietro Fittipaldi | (Russia) G-Drive Racing | 2 | | | | | | 18 |
| 16 | (Italy) Gianluca Giraudi | (France) Ultimate | | | | | | 3 | 15 |
| 17 | (United Kingdom) Ben Hanley | (United States) DragonSpeed USA | NC | 6 | NC | 9 | | | 14 |
| 17 | (Sweden) Henrik Hedman | (United States) DragonSpeed USA | NC | 6 | NC | 9 | | | 14 |
| 18 | (France) Gabriel Aubry | (France) IDEC Sport | | | 6 | | | | 8 |
| 19 | (Colombia) Juan Pablo Montoya | (United States) DragonSpeed USA | | | | 9 | | | 6 |
| 20 | (United States) Ricky Taylor | (United States) DragonSpeed USA | NC | | | | | | 0 |
Entries ineligible to score points
| — | (Netherlands) Frits van Eerd | (Netherlands) Racing Team Nederland | | | | 5 | | | — |
| — | (Netherlands) Giedo van der Garde | (Netherlands) Racing Team Nederland | | | | 5 | | | — |
| — | (France) Loïc Duval | (Switzerland) Realteam Racing | | | | 6 | | | — |
| — | (Switzerland) Esteban García | (Switzerland) Realteam Racing | | | | 6 | | | — |
| Pos. | Driver | Team | CAT (Spain) | RBR (Austria) | LEC (France) | MNZ (Italy) | SPA (Belgium) | POR (Portugal) | Points |

Key
| Colour | Result |
|---|---|
| Gold | Race winner |
| Silver | 2nd place |
| Bronze | 3rd place |
| Green | Points finish |
| Blue | Non-points finish |
| Blue | Non-classified finish (NC) |
| Purple | Did not finish (Ret) |
| Black | Disqualified (DSQ) |
| Black | Excluded (EX) |
| White | Did not start (DNS) |
| White | Race cancelled (C) |
| White | Withdrew (WD) |
| Blank | Did not participate |

**Bold** – Pole

Italics – Fastest Lap

=== LMP3 Drivers Championship ===
| Pos. | Driver | Team | CAT (Spain) | RBR (Austria) | LEC (France) | MNZ (Italy) | SPA (Belgium) | POR (Portugal) | Points |
|---|---|---|---|---|---|---|---|---|---|
| 1 | (Germany) Laurents Hörr | (Luxembourg) DKR Engineering | 5 | **8** | **1** | **1** | **1** | 4 | 105 |
| 2 | (United Kingdom) Matthew Bell | (Switzerland) Cool Racing | 1 | 1 | 2 | 4 | 2 | 7 | 104 |
| 2 | (Germany) Niklas Krütten | (Switzerland) Cool Racing | 1 | 1 | 2 | 4 | 2 | 7 | 104 |
| 2 | (France) Nicolas Maulini | (Switzerland) Cool Racing | 1 | 1 | 2 | 4 | 2 | 7 | 104 |
| 3 | (United Kingdom) Wayne Boyd | (United Kingdom) United Autosports | 13 | 6 | 3 | 2 | 3 | **2** | 75.5 |
| 3 | (France) Edouard Cauhaupe | (United Kingdom) United Autosports | 13 | 6 | 3 | 2 | 3 | **2** | 75.5 |
| 3 | (United Kingdom) Rob Wheldon | (United Kingdom) United Autosports | 13 | 6 | 3 | 2 | 3 | **2** | 75.5 |
| 4 | (Germany) Martin Hippe | (Poland) Inter Europol Competition | 3 | 4 | NC | 3 | NC | 1 | 67 |
| 4 | (Belgium) Ugo de Wilde | (Poland) Inter Europol Competition | 3 | 4 | NC | 3 | NC | 1 | 67 |
| 5 | (France) Mathieu de Barbuat | (Luxembourg) DKR Engineering | | | | **1** | **1** | 4 | 64 |
| 6 | (Switzerland) David Droux | (France) Graff Racing | 12 | 3 | 7 | 13 | 4 | 6 | 44 |
| 6 | (Switzerland) Sébastien Page | (France) Graff Racing | 12 | 3 | 7 | 13 | 4 | 6 | 44 |
| 6 | (France) Eric Trouillet | (France) Graff Racing | 12 | 3 | 7 | 13 | 4 | 6 | 44 |
| 7 | (Italy) Mattia Pasini | (Poland) Inter Europol Competition | 8 | 5 | 6 | 3 | NC | | 37 |
| 8 | (Poland) Mateusz Kaprzyk | (Italy) Eurointernational | 11 | | | | | | 32.5 |
| 8 | (Poland) Mateusz Kaprzyk | (Poland) Inter Europol Competition | | 5 | 6 | 7 | NC | 7 | 32.5 |
| 9 | (United Kingdom) Mike Benham | (United Kingdom) RLR MSport | 2 | NC | 4 | 9 | NC | NC | 32 |
| 9 | (Denmark) Malthe Jakobsen | (United Kingdom) RLR MSport | 2 | NC | 4 | 9 | NC | NC | 32 |
| 9 | (United Kingdom) Alex Kapadia | (United Kingdom) RLR MSport | 2 | NC | 4 | 9 | NC | NC | 32 |
| 10 | (France) Jean-Phillipe Dayrault | (Luxembourg) DKR Engineering | | **8** | **1** | | | | 31 |
| 11 | (United States) Rob Hodes | (Poland) Team Virage | 7 | NC | NC | 5 | 5 | 11 | 27 |
| 12 | (United States) Charles Crews | (Poland) Team Virage | 7 | NC | NC | 5 | 5 | | 26 |
| 12 | (Canada) Garett Grist | (Poland) Team Virage | 7 | NC | NC | 5 | 5 | | 26 |
| 13 | (France) Adam Eteki | (Poland) Inter Europol Competition | | | | | | 1 | 25 |
| 14 | (Liechtenstein) Matthias Kaiser | (France) Graff Racing | 14 | 12 | 9 | 14 | 7 | 3 | 24.5 |
| 14 | (Finland) Rory Penttinen | (France) Graff Racing | 14 | 12 | 9 | 14 | 7 | 3 | 24.5 |
| 15 | (Italy) Alessandro Bressan | (Italy) 1 AIM Villorba Corse | 4 | NC | NC | 8 | 6 | NC | 24 |
| 15 | (Italy) Damiano Fioravanti | (Italy) 1 AIM Villorba Corse | 4 | NC | NC | 8 | 6 | NC | 24 |
| 15 | (Greece) Andreas Laskaratos | (Italy) 1 AIM Villorba Corse | 4 | NC | NC | 8 | 6 | NC | 24 |
| 16 | (Italy) Andrea Dromedari | (Italy) Eurointernational | 11 | 2 | 10 | WD | 11 | | 20 |
| 17 | (Netherlands) Joey Alders | (Italy) Eurointernational | | 2 | 10 | WD | 11 | | 19.5 |
| 18 | (Turkey) Cem Bölükbaşı | (Italy) Eurointernational | | 2 | | | | | 18 |
| 19 | (France) Julien Falchero | (Poland) Inter Europol Competition | 3 | | | | | | 15 |
| 20 | (France) Adrien Chila | (France) MV2S Racing | NC | 7 | 11 | 6 | NC | NC | 14.5 |
| 20 | (France) Christophe Cresp | (France) MV2S Racing | NC | 7 | 11 | 6 | NC | NC | 14.5 |
| 20 | (France) Fabien Lavergne | (France) MV2S Racing | NC | 7 | 11 | 6 | NC | NC | 14.5 |
| 21 | (United Kingdom) Colin Noble | (United Kingdom) Nielsen Racing | 9 | 11 | 5 | NC | 10 | 14 | 14 |
| 21 | (United Kingdom) Anthony Wells | (United Kingdom) Nielsen Racing | 9 | 11 | 5 | NC | 10 | 14 | 14 |
| 22 | (United Kingdom) Nicholas Adcock | (United Kingdom) Nielsen Racing | 6 | 10 | 12 | 12 | 9 | 12 | 12.5 |
| 22 | (Netherlands) Max Koebolt | (United Kingdom) Nielsen Racing | 6 | 10 | 12 | 12 | 9 | 12 | 12.5 |
| 22 | (United States) Austin McCusker | (United Kingdom) Nielsen Racing | 6 | 10 | 12 | 12 | 9 | 12 | 12.5 |
| 23 | (Belgium) Ulysse de Pauw | (Poland) Inter Europol Competition | | 4 | NC | | | | 12 |
| 24 | (Lithuania) Julius Adomavičius | (Poland) Inter Europol Competition | 8 | | 6 | | | | 12 |
| 25 | (United Kingdom) Andrew Bentley | (United Kingdom) United Autosports | **10** | 9 | 13 | 10 | 8 | 10 | 11.5 |
| 25 | (United Kingdom) Duncan Tappy | (United Kingdom) United Autosports | **10** | 9 | 13 | 10 | 8 | 10 | 11.5 |
| 25 | (United States) Jim McGuire | (United Kingdom) United Autosports | **10** | 9 | 13 | 10 | 8 | 10 | 11.5 |
| 26 | (Netherlands) Alain Berg | (Luxembourg) DKR Engineering | 5 | | | | | | 10 |
| 27 | (Lithuania) Gustas Grinbergas | (Poland) Inter Europol Competition | | 5 | | | | | 10 |
| 28 | (Chile) Nico Pino | (Poland) Inter Europol Competition | | | | | NC | 7 | 8 |
| 29 | (Poland) Patryk Krupiński | (Poland) Inter Europol Competition | | | | | | 7 | 8 |
| 30 | (France) Erwin Creed | (Poland) Inter Europol Competition | | | | 7 | | | 6 |
| 30 | (Germany) Marius Zug | (Poland) Inter Europol Competition | | | | 7 | | | 6 |
| 31 | (Belgium) Tom Cloet | (Luxembourg) Racing Experience | 15 | NC | 8 | 11 | WD | 13 | 5.5 |
| 31 | (Luxembourg) Gary Hauser | (Luxembourg) Racing Experience | 15 | NC | 8 | 11 | WD | 13 | 5.5 |
| 32 | (Germany) Leonard Weiss | (Luxembourg) DKR Engineering | | **8** | | | | | 5 |
| 33 | (Luxembourg) David Hauser | (Luxembourg) Racing Experience | 15 | NC | 8 | 11 | WD | | 5 |
| 34 | (Italy) Alessandro Bracalente | (Poland) Inter Europol Competition | 8 | | | | | | 4 |
| 35 | (Italy) Mattia Drudi | (Italy) Eurointernational | | | | | | 9 | 4 |
| 35 | (France) Antoine Doquin | (Italy) Eurointernational | | | | | | 9 | 4 |
| 35 | (Germany) Finn Gehrsitz | (Italy) Eurointernational | | | | | | 9 | 4 |
| 36 | (Italy) Jacopo Baratto | (Italy) Eurointernational | | | 10 | WD | 11 | | 1.5 |
| 37 | (Switzerland) Alex Fontana | (Poland) Team Virage | | | | | | 11 | 1 |
| 37 | (Algeria) Julien Gerbi | (Poland) Team Virage | | | | | | 11 | 1 |
| 38 | (Portugal) Guilherme Oliveira | (Luxembourg) Racing Experience | | | | | | 13 | 0.5 |
| 39 | (Australia) Aidan Read | (Poland) Inter Europol Competition | | | | | NC | | 0 |
Entries ineligible to score points
| — | (France) Fabien Michal | (France) Saintéloc Racing | | | | | | 5 | — |
| — | (Switzerland) Lucas Légeret | (France) Saintéloc Racing | | | | | | 5 | — |
| Pos. | Driver | Team | CAT (Spain) | RBR (Austria) | LEC (France) | MNZ (Italy) | SPA (Belgium) | POR (Portugal) | Points |

Key
| Colour | Result |
|---|---|
| Gold | Race winner |
| Silver | 2nd place |
| Bronze | 3rd place |
| Green | Points finish |
| Blue | Non-points finish |
| Blue | Non-classified finish (NC) |
| Purple | Did not finish (Ret) |
| Black | Disqualified (DSQ) |
| Black | Excluded (EX) |
| White | Did not start (DNS) |
| White | Race cancelled (C) |
| White | Withdrew (WD) |
| Blank | Did not participate |

**Bold** – Pole

Italics – Fastest Lap

=== LMGTE Drivers Championship ===
| Pos. | Driver | Team | CAT (Spain) | RBR (Austria) | LEC (France) | MNZ (Italy) | SPA (Belgium) | POR (Portugal) | Points |
|---|---|---|---|---|---|---|---|---|---|
| 1 | (Italy) Matteo Cressoni | (Italy) Iron Lynx | 1 | 3 | 1 | 2 | 2 | 1 | 126 |
| 1 | (Spain) Miguel Molina | (Italy) Iron Lynx | 1 | 3 | 1 | 2 | 2 | 1 | 126 |
| 1 | (Italy) Rino Mastronardi | (Italy) Iron Lynx | 1 | 3 | 1 | 2 | 2 | 1 | 126 |
| 2 | (South Africa) David Perel | (Switzerland) Spirit of Race | 3 | 2 | 2 | **1** | NC | 4 | 89 |
| 2 | (United Kingdom) Duncan Cameron | (Switzerland) Spirit of Race | 3 | 2 | 2 | **1** | NC | 4 | 89 |
| 3 | (Italy) Alessio Rovera | (Italy) AF Corse | WD | **1** | 3 | 3 | 1 | 10 | 83 |
| 3 | (France) Emmanuel Collard | (Italy) AF Corse | WD | **1** | 3 | 3 | 1 | 10 | 83 |
| 3 | (France) François Perrodo | (Italy) AF Corse | WD | **1** | 3 | 3 | 1 | 10 | 83 |
| 4 | (Republic of Ireland) Matt Griffin | (Switzerland) Spirit of Race | 3 | 2 | 2 | | NC | 4 | 63 |
| 5 | (Republic of Ireland) Michael Fassbender | (Germany) Proton Competition | 6 | 4 | 8 | 7 | **4** | 2 | 61 |
| 5 | (Austria) Richard Lietz | (Germany) Proton Competition | 6 | 4 | 8 | 7 | **4** | 2 | 61 |
| 6 | (Germany) Felipe Fernández Laser | (Germany) Proton Competition | 6 | 4 | | 7 | **4** | 2 | 57 |
| 7 | (Germany) Christian Ried | (United States) WeatherTech Racing | **2** | 6 | 4 | 9 | 7 | 5 | 57 |
| 8 | (United Kingdom) Jody Fannin | (United Kingdom) JMW Motorsport | 7 | 5 | 6 | 4 | 6 | 6 | 52 |
| 8 | (United States) Rodrigo Sales | (United Kingdom) JMW Motorsport | 7 | 5 | 6 | 4 | 6 | 6 | 52 |
| 9 | (Denmark) Michelle Gatting | (Italy) Iron Lynx | 4 | NC | NC | 6 | 3 | 3 | 50 |
| 9 | (Switzerland) Rahel Frey | (Italy) Iron Lynx | 4 | NC | NC | 6 | 3 | 3 | 50 |
| 10 | (Italy) Claudio Schiavoni | (Italy) Iron Lynx | 5 | 7 | 5 | 5 | 5 | 8 | 50 |
| 10 | (Italy) Giorgio Sernagiotto | (Italy) Iron Lynx | 5 | 7 | 5 | 5 | 5 | 8 | 50 |
| 10 | (Italy) Paolo Ruberti | (Italy) Iron Lynx | 5 | 7 | 5 | 5 | 5 | 8 | 50 |
| 11 | (Italy) Andrea Fontana | (United Kingdom) JMW Motorsport | 7 | 5 | 6 | 4 | 6 | | 44 |
| 12 | (Italy) Gianmaria Bruni | (United States) WeatherTech Racing | **2** | | 4 | 9 | | 5 | 43 |
| 13 | (United States) Cooper MacNeil | (United States) WeatherTech Racing | | 6 | 4 | 9 | 7 | 5 | 38 |
| 14 | (Belgium) Sarah Bovy | (Italy) Iron Lynx | | | | | 3 | 3 | 30 |
| 15 | (United Kingdom) John Hartshorne | (United Kingdom) TF Sport | 8 | 8 | **7** | 8 | 8 | **7** | 30 |
| 15 | (United Kingdom) Ollie Hancock | (United Kingdom) TF Sport | 8 | 8 | **7** | 8 | 8 | **7** | 30 |
| 16 | (Italy) Alessandro Pier Guidi | (Switzerland) Spirit of Race | | | | **1** | | | 26 |
| 17 | (United Kingdom) Ross Gunn | (United Kingdom) TF Sport | 8 | | **7** | 8 | 8 | **7** | 26 |
| 18 | (New Zealand) Jaxon Evans | (Germany) Proton Competition | **2** | | 8 | | | | 23 |
| 19 | (Italy) Manuela Gostner | (Italy) Iron Lynx | 4 | NC | NC | 6 | | | 20 |
| 20 | (Australia) Matt Campbell | (United States) WeatherTech Racing | | 6 | | | 7 | | 14 |
| 21 | (Hong Kong) Shaun Thong | (United Kingdom) JMW Motorsport | | | | | | 6 | 8 |
| 22 | (United Kingdom) Jonathan Adam | (United Kingdom) TF Sport | | 8 | | | | | 4 |
Entries ineligible to score points
| — | (France) Franck Dezoteux | (Italy) AF Corse | | | | | | 9 | — |
| — | (France) Pierre Ragues | (Italy) AF Corse | | | | | | 9 | — |
| — | (France) Côme Ledogar | (Italy) AF Corse | | | | | | 9 | — |
| Pos. | Driver | Team | CAT (Spain) | RBR (Austria) | LEC (France) | MNZ (Italy) | SPA (Belgium) | POR (Portugal) | Points |

Key
| Colour | Result |
|---|---|
| Gold | Race winner |
| Silver | 2nd place |
| Bronze | 3rd place |
| Green | Points finish |
| Blue | Non-points finish |
| Blue | Non-classified finish (NC) |
| Purple | Did not finish (Ret) |
| Black | Disqualified (DSQ) |
| Black | Excluded (EX) |
| White | Did not start (DNS) |
| White | Race cancelled (C) |
| White | Withdrew (WD) |
| Blank | Did not participate |

**Bold** – Pole

Italics – Fastest Lap

== Teams' Championships ==
Points are awarded according to the following structure:

| Position | **1st** | **2nd** | **3rd** | **4th** | **5th** | **6th** | **7th** | **8th** | **9th** | **10th** | **Other** | **Pole** |
| Points | 25 | 18 | 15 | 12 | 10 | 8 | 6 | 4 | 2 | 1 | 0.5 | 1 |

=== LMP2 Teams Championship ===
| Pos. | Team | Car | CAT (Spain) | RBR (Austria) | LEC (France) | MNZ (Italy) | SPA (Belgium) | POR (Portugal) | Points |
|---|---|---|---|---|---|---|---|---|---|
| 1 | (Belgium) #41 Team WRT | Oreca 07 | 1 | 1 | 5 | 4 | 1 | 2 | 118 |
| 2 | (United Kingdom) #22 United Autosports | Oreca 07 | 3 | 7 | 2 | 2 | 8 | 1 | 86 |
| 3 | (France) #65 Panis Racing | Oreca 07 | 2 | 14 | 8 | 1 | 3 | 4 | 74.5 |
| 4 | (Russia) #26 G-Drive Racing | Aurus 01 | **4** | 2 | **1** | **8** | NC | 5 | 74 |
| 5 | (France) #30 Duqueine Team | Oreca 07 | 6 | 9 | 4 | 5 | 2 | NC | 52 |
| 6 | (Russia) #25 G-Drive Racing | Aurus 01 | 7 | 3 | 10 | 6 | 7 | 8 | 42 |
| 7 | (France) #28 IDEC Sport | Oreca 07 | 8 | 6 | 9 | 9 | 6 | 6 | 32 |
| 8 | #34 Racing Team Turkey | Oreca 07 | 15 | **4** | 6 | 7 | NC | WD | 29.5 |
| 9 | (United Kingdom) #32 United Autosports | Oreca 07 | 9 | 16 | 3 | WD | 5 | 10 | 28.5 |
| 10 | (Portugal) #24 Algarve Pro Racing | Oreca 07 | 11 | 8 | 7 | 10 | NC | 3 | 27.5 |
| 11 | (Switzerland) #37 Cool Racing | Oreca 07 | 10 | 10 | 12 | 12 | **4** | **6** | 25 |
| 12 | (France) #29 Ultimate | Oreca 07 | 5 | 5 | 13 | 11 | 10 | 11 | 23 |
| 13 | (United Kingdom) #35 BHK Motorsport | Oreca 07 | 13 | 15 | 11 | 18 | 9 | 9 | 6 |
| 14 | (France) #39 Graff Racing | Oreca 07 | 14 | 13 | 14 | 16 | | 12 | 2.5 |
| 15 | (France) #17 IDEC Sport | Oreca 07 | 12 | 11 | 15 | 15 | | | 2 |
| 16 | (United States) #21 DragonSpeed USA | Oreca 07 | NC | 12 | NC | 17 | | | 1 |
Entries ineligible to score points
| — | (United Kingdom) #82 Jota Sport | Oreca 07 | | | | 3 | | | — |
| — | (Netherlands) #92 Racing Team Nederland | Oreca 07 | | | | 13 | | | — |
| — | (Switzerland) #70 Realteam Racing | Oreca 07 | | | | 14 | | | — |
| Pos. | Team | Car | CAT (Spain) | RBR (Austria) | LEC (France) | MNZ (Italy) | SPA (Belgium) | POR (Portugal) | Points |

Key
| Colour | Result |
|---|---|
| Gold | Race winner |
| Silver | 2nd place |
| Bronze | 3rd place |
| Green | Points finish |
| Blue | Non-points finish |
| Blue | Non-classified finish (NC) |
| Purple | Did not finish (Ret) |
| Black | Disqualified (DSQ) |
| Black | Excluded (EX) |
| White | Did not start (DNS) |
| White | Race cancelled (C) |
| White | Withdrew (WD) |
| Blank | Did not participate |

**Bold** – Pole

Italics – Fastest Lap

=== LMP2 Pro-Am Teams Championship ===
| Pos. | Team | Car | CAT (Spain) | RBR (Austria) | LEC (France) | MNZ (Italy) | SPA (Belgium) | POR (Portugal) | Points |
|---|---|---|---|---|---|---|---|---|---|
| 1 | (Russia) #25 G-Drive Racing | Aurus 01 | 2 | 1 | 2 | 1 | 2 | 2 | 122 |
| 2 | (Switzerland) #37 Cool Racing | Oreca 07 | 3 | 4 | 3 | 4 | **1** | **1** | 106 |
| 3 | (France) #29 Ultimate | Oreca 07 | 1 | 3 | 4 | 3 | 10 | 3 | 82 |
| 4 | #34 Racing Team Turkey | Oreca 07 | 6 | **2** | 1 | 2 | NC | WD | 70 |
| 5 | (France) #39 Graff Racing | Oreca 07 | 5 | 7 | 5 | 6 | | 4 | 46 |
| 6 | (France) #17 IDEC Sport | Oreca 07 | 4 | 5 | 6 | 5 | | | 40 |
| 7 | (United States) #21 DragonSpeed USA | Oreca 07 | NC | 6 | NC | 7 | | | 14 |
Entries ineligible to score points
| — | (Netherlands) #92 Racing Team Nederland | Oreca 07 | | | | 5 | | | — |
| — | (Switzerland) #70 Realteam Racing | Oreca 07 | | | | 6 | | | — |
| Pos. | Team | Car | CAT (Spain) | RBR (Austria) | LEC (France) | MNZ (Italy) | SPA (Belgium) | POR (Portugal) | Points |

Key
| Colour | Result |
|---|---|
| Gold | Race winner |
| Silver | 2nd place |
| Bronze | 3rd place |
| Green | Points finish |
| Blue | Non-points finish |
| Blue | Non-classified finish (NC) |
| Purple | Did not finish (Ret) |
| Black | Disqualified (DSQ) |
| Black | Excluded (EX) |
| White | Did not start (DNS) |
| White | Race cancelled (C) |
| White | Withdrew (WD) |
| Blank | Did not participate |

**Bold** – Pole

Italics – Fastest Lap

=== LMP3 Teams Championship ===
| Pos. | Team | Car | CAT (Spain) | RBR (Austria) | LEC (France) | MNZ (Italy) | SPA (Belgium) | POR (Portugal) | Points |
|---|---|---|---|---|---|---|---|---|---|
| 1 | (Luxembourg) #4 DKR Engineering | Duqueine M30 - D08 | 5 | **8** | **1** | **1** | **1** | 4 | 105 |
| 2 | (Switzerland) #19 Cool Racing | Ligier JS P320 | 1 | 1 | 2 | 4 | 2 | 8 | 104 |
| 3 | (United Kingdom) #2 United Autosports | Ligier JS P320 | 13 | 6 | 3 | 2 | 3 | **2** | 75.5 |
| 4 | (Poland) #13 Inter Europol Competition | Ligier JS P320 | 3 | 4 | NC | 3 | NC | 1 | 67 |
| 5 | (France) #8 Graff Racing | Ligier JS P320 | 12 | 3 | 7 | 13 | 4 | 6 | 44 |
| 6 | (Poland) #14 Inter Europol Competition | Ligier JS P320 | 8 | 5 | 6 | 7 | NC | 7 | 36 |
| 7 | (United Kingdom) #15 RLR MSport | Ligier JS P320 | 2 | NC | 4 | 9 | NC | NC | 32 |
| 8 | (Poland) #20 Team Virage | Ligier JS P320 | 7 | NC | NC | 5 | 5 | 11 | 27 |
| 9 | (France) #9 Graff Racing | Ligier JS P320 | 14 | 12 | 9 | 14 | 7 | 3 | 24.5 |
| 10 | (Italy) #11 Eurointernational | Ligier JS P320 | 11 | 2 | 10 | WD | 11 | 9 | 24 |
| 11 | (Italy) #18 1 AIM Villorba Corse | Ligier JS P320 | 4 | NC | NC | 8 | 6 | NC | 24 |
| 12 | (France) #5 MV2S Racing | Ligier JS P320 | NC | 7 | 11 | 6 | NC | NC | 14.5 |
| 13 | (United Kingdom) #7 Nielsen Racing | Ligier JS P320 | 9 | 11 | 5 | NC | 10 | 14 | 14 |
| 14 | (United Kingdom) #6 Nielsen Racing | Ligier JS P320 | 6 | 10 | 12 | 12 | 9 | 12 | 12.5 |
| 15 | (United Kingdom) #3 United Autosports | Ligier JS P320 | **10** | 9 | 13 | 10 | 8 | 10 | 11.5 |
| 16 | (Luxembourg) #12 Racing Experience | Duqueine M30 - D08 | 15 | NC | 8 | 11 | WD | 13 | 5.5 |
Entries ineligible to score points
| — | (France) #42 Saintéloc Racing | Ligier JS P320 | | | | | | 5 | — |
| Pos. | Team | Car | CAT (Spain) | RBR (Austria) | LEC (France) | MNZ (Italy) | SPA (Belgium) | POR (Portugal) | Points |

Key
| Colour | Result |
|---|---|
| Gold | Race winner |
| Silver | 2nd place |
| Bronze | 3rd place |
| Green | Points finish |
| Blue | Non-points finish |
| Blue | Non-classified finish (NC) |
| Purple | Did not finish (Ret) |
| Black | Disqualified (DSQ) |
| Black | Excluded (EX) |
| White | Did not start (DNS) |
| White | Race cancelled (C) |
| White | Withdrew (WD) |
| Blank | Did not participate |

**Bold** – Pole

Italics – Fastest Lap

=== LMGTE Teams Championship ===
| Pos. | Team | Car | CAT (Spain) | RBR (Austria) | LEC (France) | MNZ (Italy) | SPA (Belgium) | POR (Portugal) | Points |
|---|---|---|---|---|---|---|---|---|---|
| 1 | (Italy) #80 Iron Lynx | Ferrari 488 GTE Evo | 1 | 3 | 1 | 2 | 2 | 1 | 126 |
| 2 | (Switzerland) #55 Spirit of Race | Ferrari 488 GTE Evo | 3 | 2 | 2 | **1** | NC | 4 | 89 |
| 3 | (Italy) #88 AF Corse | Ferrari 488 GTE Evo | WD | **1** | 3 | 3 | 1 | 10 | 83 |
| 4 | (Germany) #93 Proton Competition | Porsche 911 RSR-19 | 6 | 4 | 8 | 7 | **4** | 2 | 61 |
| 5 | (United States) #77 WeatherTech Racing | Porsche 911 RSR-19 | **2** | 6 | 4 | 9 | 7 | 5 | 57 |
| 6 | (United Kingdom) #66 JMW Motorsport | Ferrari 488 GTE Evo | 7 | 5 | 6 | 4 | 6 | 6 | 52 |
| 7 | (Italy) #83 Iron Lynx | Ferrari 488 GTE Evo | 4 | NC | NC | 6 | 3 | 3 | 50 |
| 8 | (Italy) #60 Iron Lynx | Ferrari 488 GTE Evo | 5 | 7 | 5 | 5 | 5 | 8 | 50 |
| 9 | (United Kingdom) #95 TF Sport | Aston Martin Vantage AMR | 8 | 8 | **7** | 8 | 8 | **7** | 30 |
Entries ineligible to score points
| — | (Italy) #61 AF Corse | Ferrari 488 GTE Evo | | | | | | 9 | — |
| Pos. | Team | Car | CAT (Spain) | RBR (Austria) | LEC (France) | MNZ (Italy) | SPA (Belgium) | POR (Portugal) | Points |

Key
| Colour | Result |
|---|---|
| Gold | Race winner |
| Silver | 2nd place |
| Bronze | 3rd place |
| Green | Points finish |
| Blue | Non-points finish |
| Blue | Non-classified finish (NC) |
| Purple | Did not finish (Ret) |
| Black | Disqualified (DSQ) |
| Black | Excluded (EX) |
| White | Did not start (DNS) |
| White | Race cancelled (C) |
| White | Withdrew (WD) |
| Blank | Did not participate |

**Bold** – Pole

Italics – Fastest Lap
