= 2021 4 Hours of Barcelona =

The layout of the Circuit de Barcelona-Catalunya

The 2021 4 Hours of Barcelona was an endurance sportscar racing event that was held on 18 April 2021, as the first round of the 2021 European Le Mans Series.

In LMP2, the race was won by the #41 Team WRT run Oreca 07-Gibson, driven by Robert Kubica, Ye Yifei, and Louis Delétraz.

In LMP3, the race was won by the #19 Cool Racing run Ligier JS P320, driven by Matthew Bell, Niklas Krütten and Nicolas Maulini.

In GTE, the race was won by the #80 Iron Lynx run Ferrari 488 GTE Evo, driven by Matteo Cressoni, Miguel Molina and Rino Mastronardi.

== Qualifying ==
=== Qualifying Result ===
Pole position in each class are marked in bold.

Pos	Class	No.	Team	Lap Time	Grid
1	LMP2	26	(Russia) G-Drive Racing	1:31.788	
2	LMP2	41	(Belgium) Team WRT	1:31.867	
3	LMP2	65	(France) Panis Racing	1:32.282	
4	LMP2	21	(United States) DragonSpeed USA	1:32.402	
5	LMP2	32	(United Kingdom) United Autosports	1:32.578	
6	LMP2	22	(United Kingdom) United Autosports	1:32.725	
7	LMP2	28	(France) IDEC Sport	1:32.746	
8	LMP2	34	Racing Team Turkey	1:33.286	
9	LMP2	25	(Russia) G-Drive Racing	1:33.359	
10	LMP2	37	(Switzerland) Cool Racing	1:33.364	
11	LMP2	29	(France) Ultimate	1:33.372	
12	LMP2	30	(France) Duqueine Team	1:33.724	
13	LMP2	17	(France) IDEC Sport	1:34.107	
14	LMP2	24	(Portugal) Algarve Pro Racing	1:34.110	
15	LMP2	35	(United Kingdom) BHK Motorsport	1:34.550	
16	LMP2	39	(France) Graff Racing	1:34.747	
17	Innovat	84	(France) Association SRT41	1:37.616	
18	LMP3	3	(United Kingdom) United Autosports	1:39.162	
19	LMP3	15	(United Kingdom) RLR MSport	1:39.183	
20	LMP3	2	(United Kingdom) United Autosports	1:39.224	
21	LMP3	4	(Luxembourg) DKR Engineering	1:39.341	
22	LMP3	13	(Poland) Inter Europol Competition	1:39.385	
23	LMP3	8	(France) Graff Racing	1:39.691	
24	LMP3	20	(Poland) Team Virage	1:39.743	
25	LMP3	18	(Italy) 1 AIM Villorba Corse	1:39.915	
26	LMP3	19	(Switzerland) Cool Racing	1:40.036	
27	LMP3	5	(France) MV2S Racing	1:40.119	
28	LMP3	9	(France) Graff Racing	1:40.236	
29	LMP3	14	(Poland) Inter Europol Competition	1:40.249	
30	LMP3	7	(United Kingdom) Nielsen Racing	1:40.261	
31	LMP3	12	(Luxembourg) Racing Experience	1:40.424	
32	LMP3	11	(Italy) Eurointernational	1:40.437	
33	LMP3	6	(United Kingdom) Nielsen Racing	1:40.643	
34	GTE	77	(Germany) Proton Competition	1:41.892	
35	GTE	80	(Italy) Iron Lynx	1:42.041	
36	GTE	83	(Italy) Iron Lynx	1:42.266	
37	GTE	93	(Germany) Proton Competition	1:42.566	
38	GTE	95	(United Kingdom) TF Sport	1:42.769	
39	GTE	66	(United Kingdom) JMW Motorsport	1:42.842	
40	GTE	55	(Switzerland) Spirit of Race	1:42.977	
41	GTE	60	(Italy) Iron Lynx	no time	

== Race ==
=== Race Result ===
Class winners are marked in bold. - Cars failing to complete 70% of the winner's distance are marked as Not Classified (NC).

Pos.	Class	No.	Team	Drivers	Chassis	Tyre	Laps	Time/Retired
Pos.	Class	No.	Team	Drivers	Engine	Tyre	Laps	Time/Retired
1	**LMP2**	**41**	**(Belgium) Team WRT**	**(Switzerland) Louis Delétraz** **(Poland) Robert Kubica** **(China) Ye Yifei**	**Oreca 07**	**G**	**141**	**4:00:43.527‡**
1	**LMP2**	**41**	**(Belgium) Team WRT**	**(Switzerland) Louis Delétraz** **(Poland) Robert Kubica** **(China) Ye Yifei**	**Gibson GK428 4.2 L V8**	**G**	**141**	**4:00:43.527‡**
2	LMP2	65	(France) Panis Racing	(France) Julien Canal (United Kingdom) Will Stevens (France) Gabriel Aubry	Oreca 07	**G**	141	+22.125 s
2	LMP2	65	(France) Panis Racing	(France) Julien Canal (United Kingdom) Will Stevens (France) Gabriel Aubry	Gibson GK428 4.2 L V8	**G**	141	+22.125 s
3	LMP2	22	(United Kingdom) United Autosports	(United Kingdom) Philip Hanson (South Africa) Jonathan Aberdein (United Kingdom) Tom Gamble	Oreca 07	**G**	141	+1:29.570 s
3	LMP2	22	(United Kingdom) United Autosports	(United Kingdom) Philip Hanson (South Africa) Jonathan Aberdein (United Kingdom) Tom Gamble	Gibson GK428 4.2 L V8	**G**	141	+1:29.570 s
4	LMP2	26	(Russia) G-Drive Racing	(Russia) Roman Rusinov (Argentina) Franco Colapinto (Netherlands) Nyck de Vries	Oreca 07	**G**	141	+1:34.085 s
4	LMP2	26	(Russia) G-Drive Racing	(Russia) Roman Rusinov (Argentina) Franco Colapinto (Netherlands) Nyck de Vries	Gibson GK428 4.2 L V8	**G**	141	+1:34.085 s
5	LMP2	29	(France) Ultimate	(France) Matthieu Lahaye (France) Jean-Baptiste Lahaye (France) François Heriau	Oreca 07	**G**	140	+1 lap
5	LMP2	29	(France) Ultimate	(France) Matthieu Lahaye (France) Jean-Baptiste Lahaye (France) François Heriau	Gibson GK428 4.2 L V8	**G**	140	+1 lap
6	LMP2	30	(France) Duqueine Team	(France) Tristan Gommendy (Austria) René Binder (Mexico) Memo Rojas	Oreca 07	**G**	140	+1 lap
6	LMP2	30	(France) Duqueine Team	(France) Tristan Gommendy (Austria) René Binder (Mexico) Memo Rojas	Gibson GK428 4.2 L V8	**G**	140	+1 lap
7	LMP2	25	(Russia) G-Drive Racing	(United States) John Falb (Portugal) Rui Andrade (Brazil) Pietro Fittipaldi	Oreca 07	**G**	140	+1 lap
7	LMP2	25	(Russia) G-Drive Racing	(United States) John Falb (Portugal) Rui Andrade (Brazil) Pietro Fittipaldi	Gibson GK428 4.2 L V8	**G**	140	+1 lap
8	LMP2	28	(France) IDEC Sport	(France) Paul Lafargue (France) Paul-Loup Chatin (France) Patrick Pilet	Oreca 07	**G**	140	+1 lap
8	LMP2	28	(France) IDEC Sport	(France) Paul Lafargue (France) Paul-Loup Chatin (France) Patrick Pilet	Gibson GK428 4.2 L V8	**G**	140	+1 lap
9	LMP2	32	(United Kingdom) United Autosports	(Netherlands) Job van Uitert (France) Nico Jamin (Venezuela) Manuel Maldonado	Oreca 07	**G**	139	+2 laps
9	LMP2	32	(United Kingdom) United Autosports	(Netherlands) Job van Uitert (France) Nico Jamin (Venezuela) Manuel Maldonado	Gibson GK428 4.2 L V8	**G**	139	+2 laps
10	LMP2	37	(Switzerland) Cool Racing	(Switzerland) Alexandre Coigny (France) Nicolas Lapierre (Switzerland) Antonin Borga	Oreca 07	**G**	139	+2 laps
10	LMP2	37	(Switzerland) Cool Racing	(Switzerland) Alexandre Coigny (France) Nicolas Lapierre (Switzerland) Antonin Borga	Gibson GK428 4.2 L V8	**G**	139	+2 laps
11	LMP2	24	(Portugal) Algarve Pro Racing	(Mexico) Diego Menchaca (Austria) Ferdinand Habsburg (United Kingdom) Richard Bradley	Oreca 07	**G**	139	+2 laps
11	LMP2	24	(Portugal) Algarve Pro Racing	(Mexico) Diego Menchaca (Austria) Ferdinand Habsburg (United Kingdom) Richard Bradley	Gibson GK428 4.2 L V8	**G**	139	+2 laps
12	LMP2	17	(France) IDEC Sport	(United States) Dwight Merriman (United Kingdom) Kyle Tilley (United Kingdom) Ryan Dalziel	Oreca 07	**G**	139	+2 laps
12	LMP2	17	(France) IDEC Sport	(United States) Dwight Merriman (United Kingdom) Kyle Tilley (United Kingdom) Ryan Dalziel	Gibson GK428 4.2 L V8	**G**	139	+2 laps
13	LMP2	35	(United Kingdom) BHK Motorsport	(Italy) Francesco Dracone (Italy) Sergio Campana (Germany) Markus Pommer	Oreca 07	**G**	138	+3 laps
13	LMP2	35	(United Kingdom) BHK Motorsport	(Italy) Francesco Dracone (Italy) Sergio Campana (Germany) Markus Pommer	Gibson GK428 4.2 L V8	**G**	138	+3 laps
14	LMP2	39	(France) Graff Racing	(France) Vincent Capillaire (France) Maxime Robin (France) Arnold Robin	Oreca 07	**G**	136	+5 laps
14	LMP2	39	(France) Graff Racing	(France) Vincent Capillaire (France) Maxime Robin (France) Arnold Robin	Gibson GK428 4.2 L V8	**G**	136	+5 laps
15	**LMP3**	**19**	(Switzerland) **Cool Racing**	(Switzerland) **Nicolas Maulini** (United Kingdom) **Matt Bell** (Germany) **Niklas Krütten**	**Ligier JS P320**	**MI**	**133**	**+8 laps**
15	**LMP3**	**19**	(Switzerland) **Cool Racing**	(Switzerland) **Nicolas Maulini** (United Kingdom) **Matt Bell** (Germany) **Niklas Krütten**	**Nissan VK56DE 5.6 L V8**	**MI**	**133**	**+8 laps**
16	LMP3	15	(United Kingdom) RLR MSport	(United Kingdom) Michael Benham (United Kingdom) Alex Kapadia (Denmark) Malthe Jakobsen	Ligier JS P320	**MI**	133	+8 laps
16	LMP3	15	(United Kingdom) RLR MSport	(United Kingdom) Michael Benham (United Kingdom) Alex Kapadia (Denmark) Malthe Jakobsen	Nissan VK56DE 5.6 L V8	**MI**	133	+8 laps
17	LMP3	13	(Poland) Inter Europol Competition	(Germany) Martin Hippe (Belgium) Ugo de Wilde (France) Julien Falchero	Ligier JS P320	**MI**	133	+8 laps
17	LMP3	13	(Poland) Inter Europol Competition	(Germany) Martin Hippe (Belgium) Ugo de Wilde (France) Julien Falchero	Nissan VK56DE 5.6 L V8	**MI**	133	+8 laps
18	LMP3	18	(Italy) 1 AIM Villorba Corse	(Italy) Alessandro Bressan (Greece) Andreas Laskaratos (Italy) Damiano Fioravanti	Ligier JS P320	**MI**	133	+8 laps
18	LMP3	18	(Italy) 1 AIM Villorba Corse	(Italy) Alessandro Bressan (Greece) Andreas Laskaratos (Italy) Damiano Fioravanti	Nissan VK56DE 5.6 L V8	**MI**	133	+8 laps
19	LMP3	4	(Luxembourg) DKR Engineering	(Germany) Laurents Hörr (Netherlands) Alain Berg	Ligier JS P320	**MI**	133	+8 laps
19	LMP3	4	(Luxembourg) DKR Engineering	(Germany) Laurents Hörr (Netherlands) Alain Berg	Nissan VK56DE 5.6 L V8	**MI**	133	+8 laps
20	LMP3	6	(United Kingdom) Nielsen Racing	(United Kingdom) Nicholas Adcock (United States) Austin McCusker (Netherlands) Max Koebolt	Ligier JS P320	**MI**	133	+8 laps
20	LMP3	6	(United Kingdom) Nielsen Racing	(United Kingdom) Nicholas Adcock (United States) Austin McCusker (Netherlands) Max Koebolt	Nissan VK56DE 5.6 L V8	**MI**	133	+8 laps
21	LMP3	20	(Poland) Team Virage	(United States) Rob Hodes (Canada) Garett Grist (United States) C. R. Crews	Ligier JS P320	**MI**	132	+9 laps
21	LMP3	20	(Poland) Team Virage	(United States) Rob Hodes (Canada) Garett Grist (United States) C. R. Crews	Nissan VK56DE 5.6 L V8	**MI**	132	+9 laps
22	LMP3	14	(Poland) Inter Europol Competition	(Lithuania) Julius Adomavicius (Italy) Alessandro Bracalente (Italy) Mattia Pasini	Ligier JS P320	**MI**	132	+9 laps
22	LMP3	14	(Poland) Inter Europol Competition	(Lithuania) Julius Adomavicius (Italy) Alessandro Bracalente (Italy) Mattia Pasini	Nissan VK56DE 5.6 L V8	**MI**	132	+9 laps
23	**GTE**	**80**	(Italy) **Iron Lynx**	(Italy) **Matteo Cressoni** (Italy) **Rino Mastronardi** (Spain) **Miguel Molina**	**Ferrari 488 GTE Evo**	**G**	**132**	**+9 laps**
23	**GTE**	**80**	(Italy) **Iron Lynx**	(Italy) **Matteo Cressoni** (Italy) **Rino Mastronardi** (Spain) **Miguel Molina**	**Ferrari F154CB 3.9 L Turbo V8**	**G**	**132**	**+9 laps**
24	LMP3	7	(United Kingdom) Nielsen Racing	(United Kingdom) Anthony Wells (United Kingdom) Colin Noble	Ligier JS P320	**MI**	132	+9 laps
24	LMP3	7	(United Kingdom) Nielsen Racing	(United Kingdom) Anthony Wells (United Kingdom) Colin Noble	Nissan VK56DE 5.6 L V8	**MI**	132	+9 laps
25	LMP3	3	(United Kingdom) United Autosports	(United States) Jim McGuire (United Kingdom) Duncan Tappy (United Kingdom) Andrew Bentley	Ligier JS P320	**MI**	131	+10 laps
25	LMP3	3	(United Kingdom) United Autosports	(United States) Jim McGuire (United Kingdom) Duncan Tappy (United Kingdom) Andrew Bentley	Nissan VK56DE 5.6 L V8	**MI**	131	+10 laps
26	LMP3	11	(Italy) Eurointernational	(Italy) Andrea Domedari (Poland) Mateusz Kaprzyk	Ligier JS P320	**MI**	131	+10 laps
26	LMP3	11	(Italy) Eurointernational	(Italy) Andrea Domedari (Poland) Mateusz Kaprzyk	Nissan VK56DE 5.6 L V8	**MI**	131	+10 laps
27	GTE	77	(Germany) Proton Competition	(Germany) Christian Ried (New Zealand) Jaxon Evans (Italy) Gianmaria Bruni	Porsche 911 RSR-19	**G**	131	+10 laps
27	GTE	77	(Germany) Proton Competition	(Germany) Christian Ried (New Zealand) Jaxon Evans (Italy) Gianmaria Bruni	Porsche M97/80 4.2 L Flat-6	**G**	131	+10 laps
28	GTE	55	(Switzerland) Spirit of Race	(United Kingdom) Duncan Cameron (Republic of Ireland) Matt Griffin (South Africa) David Perel	Ferrari 488 GTE Evo	**G**	131	+10 laps
28	GTE	55	(Switzerland) Spirit of Race	(United Kingdom) Duncan Cameron (Republic of Ireland) Matt Griffin (South Africa) David Perel	Ferrari F154CB 3.9 L Turbo V8	**G**	131	+10 laps
29	GTE	83	(Italy) Iron Lynx	(Switzerland) Rahel Frey (Denmark) Michelle Gatting (Italy) Manuela Gostner	Ferrari 488 GTE Evo	**G**	130	+11 laps
29	GTE	83	(Italy) Iron Lynx	(Switzerland) Rahel Frey (Denmark) Michelle Gatting (Italy) Manuela Gostner	Ferrari F154CB 3.9 L Turbo V8	**G**	130	+11 laps
30	GTE	60	(Italy) Iron Lynx	(Italy) Claudio Schiavoni (Italy) Giorgio Sernagiotto (Italy) Paolo Ruberti	Ferrari 488 GTE Evo	**G**	130	+11 laps
30	GTE	60	(Italy) Iron Lynx	(Italy) Claudio Schiavoni (Italy) Giorgio Sernagiotto (Italy) Paolo Ruberti	Ferrari F154CB 3.9 L Turbo V8	**G**	130	+11 laps
31	GTE	93	(Germany) Proton Competition	(Republic of Ireland) Michael Fassbender (Germany) Felipe Fernández Laser (Austria) Richard Lietz	Porsche 911 RSR-19	**G**	130	+11 laps
31	GTE	93	(Germany) Proton Competition	(Republic of Ireland) Michael Fassbender (Germany) Felipe Fernández Laser (Austria) Richard Lietz	Porsche M97/80 4.2 L Flat-6	**G**	130	+11 laps
32	GTE	66	(United Kingdom) JMW Motorsport	(United Kingdom) Jody Fannin (Italy) Andrea Fontana (United States) Rodrigo Sales	Ferrari 488 GTE Evo	**G**	130	+11 laps
32	GTE	66	(United Kingdom) JMW Motorsport	(United Kingdom) Jody Fannin (Italy) Andrea Fontana (United States) Rodrigo Sales	Ferrari F154CB 3.9 L Turbo V8	**G**	130	+11 laps
33	GTE	95	(United Kingdom) TF Sport	(United Kingdom) John Hartshorne (United Kingdom) Ross Gunn (United Kingdom) Ollie Hancock	Aston Martin Vantage AMR	**G**	128	+13 laps
33	GTE	95	(United Kingdom) TF Sport	(United Kingdom) John Hartshorne (United Kingdom) Ross Gunn (United Kingdom) Ollie Hancock	Aston Martin M177 4.0 L Turbo V8	**G**	128	+13 laps
34	**Innovat**	**84**	(France) **Association SRT41**	(Japan) Takuma Aoki (Belgium) Nigel Bailly (France) Pierre Sancinéna	Oreca 07	?	127	+14 laps
34	**Innovat**	**84**	(France) **Association SRT41**	(Japan) Takuma Aoki (Belgium) Nigel Bailly (France) Pierre Sancinéna	Gibson GK428 4.2 L V8	?	127	+14 laps
35	LMP3	8	(France) Graff Racing	(France) Eric Trouillet (Switzerland) Sébastien Page (Switzerland) David Droux	Ligier JS P320	**MI**	127	+14 laps
35	LMP3	8	(France) Graff Racing	(France) Eric Trouillet (Switzerland) Sébastien Page (Switzerland) David Droux	Nissan VK56DE 5.6 L V8	**MI**	127	+14 laps
36	LMP3	2	(United Kingdom) United Autosports	(United Kingdom) Wayne Boyd (United Kingdom) Rob Wheldon (France) Edouard Cauhaupe	Ligier JS P320	**MI**	125	+16 laps
36	LMP3	2	(United Kingdom) United Autosports	(United Kingdom) Wayne Boyd (United Kingdom) Rob Wheldon (France) Edouard Cauhaupe	Nissan VK56DE 5.6 L V8	**MI**	125	+16 laps
37	LMP3	9	(France) Graff Racing	(Liechtenstein) Matthias Kaiser (Finland) Rory Penttinen	Ligier JS P320	**MI**	119	+22 laps
37	LMP3	9	(France) Graff Racing	(Liechtenstein) Matthias Kaiser (Finland) Rory Penttinen	Nissan VK56DE 5.6 L V8	**MI**	119	+22 laps
38	LMP2	34	Racing Team Turkey	(Turkey) Salih Yoluç (Republic of Ireland) Charlie Eastwood (United Kingdom) Harry Tincknell	Oreca 07	**G**	116	+25 laps
38	LMP2	34	Racing Team Turkey	(Turkey) Salih Yoluç (Republic of Ireland) Charlie Eastwood (United Kingdom) Harry Tincknell	Gibson GK428 4.2 L V8	**G**	116	+25 laps
39	LMP3	12	(Luxembourg) Racing Experience	(Luxembourg) David Hauser (Luxembourg) Gary Hauser (Belgium) Tom Cloet	Ligier JS P320	**MI**	115	+26 laps
39	LMP3	12	(Luxembourg) Racing Experience	(Luxembourg) David Hauser (Luxembourg) Gary Hauser (Belgium) Tom Cloet	Nissan VK56DE 5.6 L V8	**MI**	115	+26 laps
DNF	LMP3	5	(France) MV2S Racing	(France) Christophe Cresp (France) Fabien Lavergne (France) Adrien Chila	Ligier JS P320	**MI**	122	+13 laps
DNF	LMP3	5	(France) MV2S Racing	(France) Christophe Cresp (France) Fabien Lavergne (France) Adrien Chila	Nissan VK56DE 5.6 L V8	**MI**	122	+13 laps
DNF	LMP2	21	(United States) DragonSpeed USA	(Sweden) Henrik Hedman (United Kingdom) Ben Hanley (United States) Ricky Taylor	Oreca 07	**G**	7	+136 laps
DNF	LMP2	21	(United States) DragonSpeed USA	(Sweden) Henrik Hedman (United Kingdom) Ben Hanley (United States) Ricky Taylor	Gibson GK428 4.2 L V8	**G**	7	+136 laps
