= Nicolas Maulini =

Swiss racing driver

- Nationality: (Switzerland) Swiss
- Born: 5 January 1981 (age 45) Geneva (Switzerland)

European Le Mans Series career
- Debut season: 2018
- Current team: Cool Racing
- Categorisation: FIA Silver (until 2018, 2022–); FIA Bronze (2019–2021)
- Car number: 26
- Former teams: Eurointernational, DKR Engineering
- Best finish: 1st in 2020

Previous series
- 2018 - 2020: Michelin Le Mans Cup

Championship titles
- 2023 2004: Ultimate Cup Series Proto NP02; Renault Speed Trophy F2000

Nicolas Maulini (born 5 January 1981 in Geneva) is a Swiss racing driver. He has competed in such series as International Formula Master and the Eurocup Mégane Trophy. He won the Renault Speed Trophy F2000 championship in 2004.

== Racing record ==
=== Complete European Le Mans Series results ===
(key) (Races in bold indicate pole position; results in italics indicate fastest lap)

Year	Entrant	Class	Chassis	Engine	1	2	3	4	5	6	Rank	Points
2018	DKR Engineering	LMP3	Norma M30	Nissan VK50VE 5.0 L V8	LEC	MNZ	RBR	SIL	SPA	ALG; 19	NC	0
2020	Eurointernational	LMP3	Ligier JS P320	Nissan VK56DE 5.6L V8	LEC	SPA	LEC; 7	MNZ; 2	ALG; 6		12th	32
2021	Cool Racing	LMP3	Ligier JS P320	Nissan VK56DE 5.6L V8	CAT; 1	RBR; 1	LEC; 2	MNZ; 4	SPA; 2	ALG; 8	2nd	104
2022	Cool Racing	LMP3	Ligier JS P320	Nissan VK56DE 5.6L V8	LEC; Ret	IMO; 2	MNZ; 6	CAT; Ret	SPA; 4	ALG; 3	7th	53
