= McLaren Trophy Europe =

Auto racing championship held in Europe

- McLaren Trophy Europe logo since 2023
- Category: Sports car racing
- Region: Europe
- Inaugural season: 2023
- Classes: Pro; Pro-Am; Am
- Manufacturers: McLaren Automotive
- Engine suppliers: McLaren Automotive
- Tyre suppliers: Pirelli
- Current champions: (United Kingdom) Callum Davies (Denmark) Luca Magnussen
- Teams' champion: (Spain) SMC Motorsport
- Official website: mclarentrophyeurope.com

The McLaren Trophy Europe is a European sports car racing championship organised by the SRO Motorsports Group (SRO). The series is designed around two drivers competing in McLaren Artura Trophy cars during 50-minute races, although single-driver entries can be eligible. Participants can enter one of three classes: Pro, Pro-Am, or Am. Previously, the series allowed the use of McLaren 570S Trophy cars, but starting in 2025, it has transitioned to a one-make championship. Additionally, the series introduced the Papaya Cup, which provides an extra title for inexperienced Am drivers. The SRO awards championship titles to the top-scoring drivers and teams at the end of the season.

== History ==
The championship launched in 2023. McLaren Automotive established it as a customer racing series for both amateur and professional drivers, racing in identical McLaren cars. The series is an evolution of McLaren's GT racing programs and is designed as a stepping stone for Bronze and Silver-rated drivers transitioning from GT4 to GT3 racing. The championship uses a single-make format, meaning all competitors race in identical machinery on circuits throughout Europe. This emphasises driver skill over car performance.

The 570S Trophy of Ryan James and Oliver Webb (top), and the Artura Trophy SMC Motorsport car of Gonzalo de Andrés and Alejandro Geppert (bottom), during the 2024 season, before the championship became a one-make series.

The series has evolved its featured cars over time. Initially, the series ran with the McLaren 570S Trophy alongside the newer Artura Trophy. In 2024, the series solidified its presence on the SRO Motorsports Group package, primarily as a support race for the GT World Challenge Europe, who undertook organisational responsibilities of the championship. The Spanish team, SMC Motorsport, emerged as a dominant force in the early years, with Gonzalo de Andres being crowned Artura Trophy champion for the first two consecutive seasons.

For the 2025 season, the enhanced Artura Trophy Evo was introduced, turning the series into a one-make championship, offering increased performance through improved aerodynamics, wider tyres, and a "Push-to-Pass" system boosting power from 585PS to 620PS when activated. Additionally, a new Pro category for Silver-rated drivers was established to support young talent through the McLaren Trophy Academy. Jayden Kelly and Michael O'Brien secured the initial championship for Pro drivers. The 2026 season is seeing continued growth with new entrants like Target Racing bringing record grid sizes in the championship's fourth year.

At the 2026 24 Hours of Spa, it was announced that, alongside the debut of the McLaren MCL-HY Hypercar at the Circuit de la Sarthe for the 2027 24 Hours of Le Mans, the McLaren Trophy Europe, with guest entries from McLaren Trophy America and other McLaren GT3 and GT4 customer teams, would run the championship’s third and fourth rounds as part of the event’s support package for the first time.

== Format ==
The championship is a one-make championship featuring identical McLaren Artura Trophy Evo cars, designed to prioritise driving talent. The race weekend structure sees each event typically following a double-header format, providing nearly five hours of track time. Practice consists of two 60-minute sessions on the opening day. Each race day features a 15-minute pre-qualifying session followed by a 15-minute qualifying sesson. The races consist of two 50-minute races per weekend, starting with a rolling start. During the races there are mandatory pit stops for driver changes which occur within a designated window (typically the 20th–30th minute for Pro pairings).

Teams can choose to compete with a driver pairing or as a solo entry in three main categories. The first of which is Pro, which acts as a class for Silver-rated young professional or semi-pro driver pairings. Pro-Am features a pairing of a professional (Gold/Silver/Platinum) and an amateur (Bronze) driver. The Bronze driver must qualify the car and start the races. Cars in the Am class are exclusively for Bronze-rated amateur drivers, who can also compete for the Papaya Cup if they have limited racing experience.

As of 2026, the scoring system awards points to the top eight finishers (1st: 12 pts, 2nd: 9, 3rd: 7, down to 8th: 1). Push-to-Pass was introduced in 2025 and featured in the new Artura Trophy Evo car, providing 300 seconds of additional power (up to 620PS) per session. As an SRO series, the championship primarily supports the GT World Challenge Europe. As the series has grown, it has held various rounds as support races for prominent events such as the 24 Hours of Spa and 24 Hours of Le Mans.

== Champions ==
=== Drivers ===
Year	Pro Cup	Pro-Am Cup	Am Cup	Papaya Cup	Artura Trophy	570S Trophy
2023	—N/a	—N/a	—N/a	—N/a	(Spain) Gonzalo de Andrés (Spain) Tommy Pintos	(United Kingdom) David Foster (United Kingdom) Bradley Ellis
2024	—N/a	—N/a	(Sweden) Erik Behrens	—N/a	(Spain) Gonzalo de Andrés (2) (Spain) Alejandro Geppert	(United Kingdom) Ryan James (United Kingdom) Oliver Webb
2025	(Australia) Jayden Kelly (United Kingdom) Michael O'Brien	(United Kingdom) Ryan James (United Kingdom) Oliver Webb	(United Kingdom) Tim Docker	(Germany) Klaus Halsig	—N/a	—N/a
2026	(United Kingdom) Callum Davies (Denmark) Luca Magnussen	(Sweden) Erik Behrens (Spain) Alejandro Geppert	(United Kingdom) Charlie Martin	(Portugal) David Coelho	—N/a	—N/a

=== Teams ===
Year	Overall
2023	(United Kingdom) Greystone GT
2024	(Spain) SMC Motorsport
2025	(United Kingdom) Greystone GT [Pro]
2026	(Spain) SMC Motorsport (2)

== Circuits ==
- **Bold** indicates a circuit scheduled for use in the 2027 season.

Circuit	Location	Country	Last length used	Season(s)	Races held
Algarve International Circuit	Portimão	Portugal	4.653 km (2.891 mi)	2026	1
Brands Hatch	Kent	United Kingdom	3.916 km (2.433 mi)	2025	1
**Circuit de Barcelona-Catalunya**	Montmeló	Spain	4.657 km (2.894 mi)	2023–2024, 2026–2027	3
**Circuit de la Sarthe**	Le Mans	France	13.626 km (8.467 mi)	2027	0
Circuit de Spa-Francorchamps	Stavelot	Belgium	7.004 km (4.352 mi)	2023–2026	4
**Circuit Paul Ricard**	Le Castellet	France	5.770 km (3.585 mi)	2023, 2025, 2027	2
**Circuit Zandvoort**	Zandvoort	Netherlands	4.259 km (2.646 mi)	2027	0
Hockenheimring	Hockenheim	Germany	4.574 km (2.842 mi)	2023	1
**Misano World Circuit**	Misano Adriatico	Italy	4.226 km (2.626 mi)	2023–2024, 2026–2027	3
Monza Circuit	Monza	Italy	5.793 km (3.600 mi)	2024–2026	3
Nürburgring	Nürburg	Germany	5.148 km (3.199 mi)	2024–2025	2

== See also ==
- McLaren Trophy America
