= 2027 McLaren Trophy Europe =

5th season of the McLaren Trophy Europe

The 2027 McLaren Trophy Europe is a planned motor racing championship for McLaren Artura Trophy cars and will be the 5th running. It is organised and promoted by the SRO Motorsports Group. The championship will be contested over five rounds, each with two 50-minute races, at various European circuits. It will begin in April at Circuit Paul Ricard and conclude in October at the Circuit de Barcelona-Catalunya.

== Entries ==
All teams will compete on tyres supplied by Pirelli, SRO Motorsports Group’s official tyre supplier, in the Pro, Pro-Am or Am class. Additionally, inexperienced amateur drivers in the Pro-Am or Am classes are eligible for Papaya Cup points.

== Calendar ==
Round	Circuit	Date	Supporting	Map
1	(France) Circuit Paul Ricard, Le Castellet	16–18 April	GT World Challenge Europe	2027 McLaren Trophy Europe is located in Europe
2	(France) Circuit de la Sarthe, Le Mans	10–12 June	FIA World Endurance Championship	2027 McLaren Trophy Europe is located in Europe
3	(Italy) Misano World Circuit, Misano Adriatico	16–18 July	GT World Challenge Europe	2027 McLaren Trophy Europe is located in Europe
4	(Netherlands) Circuit Zandvoort, Zandvoort	17–19 September	GT World Challenge Europe	2027 McLaren Trophy Europe is located in Europe
5	(Spain) Circuit de Barcelona-Catalunya	22–24 October	GT World Challenge Europe	2027 McLaren Trophy Europe is located in Europe

=== Calendar changes ===
The 2027 season will see the debut of two circuits on the McLaren Trophy Europe calendar: Circuit de la Sarthe, where the series will serve as a support race for the FIA World Endurance Championship and the 24 Hours of Le Mans for the first time, and Circuit Zandvoort. As a result, the championship will not appear at Circuit de Spa-Francorchamps for the first time since its 2023 debut. Monza Circuit, which is undergoing renovations, will also not host a round in 2027.

== See also ==
- 2027 McLaren Trophy America
