= 2027 GT World Challenge Asia =

Motor racing competition season

The 2027 GT World Challenge Asia Powered by AWS will be the eight season of the GT World Challenge Asia, an auto racing series for grand tourer cars in Asia, co-promoted by the SRO Motorsports Group and Team Asia One GT Management. The races will contested with GT3-spec cars. The season will begin on 4 April at the Sepang International Circuit in Malaysia and is scheduled to end on 1 November in the Shanghai International Circuit in China.

== Calendar ==
Round	Circuit	Date	Location
1	(Malaysia) Petronas Sepang International Circuit, Sepang District, Selangor	3–4 April	2027 GT World Challenge Asia is located in Asia
2	Chang International Circuit, Buriram, Thailand	1–2 May	2027 GT World Challenge Asia is located in Asia
3	(Japan) Suzuka International Racing Course, Suzuka, Mie	12–13 June	2027 GT World Challenge Asia is located in Asia
4	(Japan) Fuji Speedway, Oyama, Shizuoka	10–11 July	2027 GT World Challenge Asia is located in Asia
5	Beijing Street Circuit, Beijing, China	2–3 October	2027 GT World Challenge Asia is located in Asia
6	(China) Shanghai International Circuit, Jiading, Shanghai	23-24 October	2027 GT World Challenge Asia is located in Asia

== Entry list ==
Team	Car	Engine	No.	Drivers	Class	Rounds
(Belgium) Teamwork Motorsport by Team WRT	BMW M4 GT3 Evo	BMW P58 3.0 L Turbo I6	TBA	TBA		TBC
(Belgium) Teamwork Motorsport by Team WRT	BMW M4 GT3 Evo	BMW P58 3.0 L Turbo I6	TBA	TBA		TBC
(Belgium) Teamwork Motorsport by Team WRT	BMW M4 GT3 Evo	BMW P58 3.0 L Turbo I6	TBA	TBA		TBC
(Belgium) Teamwork Motorsport by Team WRT	BMW M4 GT3 Evo	BMW P58 3.0 L Turbo I6	TBA	TBA		TBC

Icon	Class
Drivers
PA	Pro-Am Cup
S	Silver Cup
SA	Silver-Am Cup
Am	Am Cup
	GT Academy Entrant

== See also ==
- 2027 British GT Championship
- 2027 GT World Challenge Europe
- 2027 GT World Challenge Europe Endurance Cup
- 2027 GT World Challenge Europe Sprint Cup
- 2027 GT World Challenge America
- 2027 GT World Challenge Australia
- 2027 Intercontinental GT Challenge
- 2027 GT3 Revival Series
