= 2027 GT World Challenge America =

Nineteenth season of GT World Challenge America

The 2027 GT World Challenge America Powered by AWS is the twenty-first season of the United States Auto Club's GT World Challenge America, and the tenth under ownership of SRO Motorsports Group. The season will at Sonoma on April 2, and will end at Indianapolis on October 11.

== Calendar ==
The provisional calendar was released on June 26, 2026, at the SRO's annual 24 Hours of Spa press conference, featuring 7 races across seven rounds. This season will see the inaugural running of the Texas 8 Hour at the Circuit of the Americas and seeing the return to Watkins Glen for the first time since 2022, which will replace Sebring.

Round	Circuit	Date	Map
1	Sonoma Raceway, Sonoma, California	April 2–4	2027 GT World Challenge America is located in the United States
2	Circuit of the Americas, Austin, Texas	May 8–9	2027 GT World Challenge America is located in the United States
3	(New York (state)) Watkins Glen International, Watkins Glen, New York	May 21–23	2027 GT World Challenge America is located in the United States
4	(Georgia (U.S. state)) Road Atlanta, Braselton, Georgia	June 18–20	2027 GT World Challenge America is located in the United States
5	Road America, Elkhart Lake, Wisconsin	August 27–29	2027 GT World Challenge America is located in the United States
6	Barber Motorsports Park, Birmingham, Alabama	September 10–12	2027 GT World Challenge America is located in the United States
7	Indianapolis Motor Speedway, Indianapolis, Indiana	October 1–3	2027 GT World Challenge America is located in the United States

== Entry list ==
Team	Car	Engine	No.	Drivers	Class	Rounds
(United States) MG1 Motorsports	Ferrari 296 GT3 Evo	Ferrari F163CE 3.0 L Turbo V6	33	(United States) Steve Check	Am	TBC
(United States) MG1 Motorsports	Ferrari 296 GT3 Evo	Ferrari F163CE 3.0 L Turbo V6	33	(United States) Ken Dobson	Am	TBC
(United States) MG1 Motorsports	Ferrari 296 GT3 Evo	Ferrari F163CE 3.0 L Turbo V6	38	(United States) Tyler McQuarrie	PA	TBC
(United States) MG1 Motorsports	Ferrari 296 GT3 Evo	Ferrari F163CE 3.0 L Turbo V6	38	(United States) Mike Petramalo	PA	TBC
(United States) ACI Motorsports	Mercedes-AMG GT3 Evo	Mercedes-AMG M159 6.2 L V8	74	(United States) Yves Baltas	PA	TBC
(United States) ACI Motorsports	Mercedes-AMG GT3 Evo	Mercedes-AMG M159 6.2 L V8	74	(United States) Matt Smith	PA	TBC
(United States) Random Vandals Racing	BMW M4 GT3 Evo	BMW P58 3.0 L Turbo I6	TBA	TBA	PA	TBC
(United States) Random Vandals Racing	BMW M4 GT3 Evo	BMW P58 3.0 L Turbo I6	TBA	TBA	PA	TBC
(United States) Random Vandals Racing	BMW M4 GT3 Evo	BMW P58 3.0 L Turbo I6	TBA	TBA	Am	TBC
(United States) Random Vandals Racing	BMW M4 GT3 Evo	BMW P58 3.0 L Turbo I6	TBA	TBA	Am	TBC

Icon	Class
P	Pro Cup
PA	Pro-Am Cup
Am	Am Cup
	GT Academy Entrant

== See also ==
- 2027 GT World Challenge Asia
- 2027 GT World Challenge Australia
- 2027 GT World Challenge Europe
- 2027 GT World Challenge Europe Endurance Cup
- 2027 GT World Challenge Europe Sprint Cup
- 2027 Intercontinental GT Challenge
