= 2027 GT World Challenge Europe Endurance Cup =

Motorsports event

The 2027 GT World Challenge Europe Endurance Cup will be the seventeenth season of the GT World Challenge Europe Endurance Cup since its inception in 2011 as the Blancpain Endurance Series. The season will begin on 17 April at Circuit Paul Ricard and will finish on 24 October at the Circuit de Barcelona-Catalunya.

== Calendar ==
The provisional calendar was released on 26 June 2026 at the SRO's annual 24 Hours of Spa press conference, featuring five rounds.

Round	Race	Circuit	Date	Map
1	6 Hours of Paul Ricard	Circuit Paul Ricard, Le Castellet, France	16–17 April	2027 GT World Challenge Europe Endurance Cup is located in Europe
2	3 Hours of Imola	Autodromo Internazionale Enzo e Dino Ferrari, Imola, Italy	21–23 May	2027 GT World Challenge Europe Endurance Cup is located in Europe
3	CrowdStrike 24 Hours of Spa	Circuit de Spa-Francorchamps, Stavelot, Belgium	24–27 June	2027 GT World Challenge Europe Endurance Cup is located in Europe
4	3 Hours of Nürburgring	Nürburgring, Nürburg, Germany	28–29 August	2027 GT World Challenge Europe Endurance Cup is located in Europe
5	3 Hours of Barcelona	Circuit de Barcelona-Catalunya, Montmeló, Spain	23–24 October	2027 GT World Challenge Europe Endurance Cup is located in Europe

== Entry list ==
Team	Car	No.	Drivers	Class	Rounds
(Germany) Walkenhorst Motorsport	Aston Martin Vantage AMR GT3 Evo	34	TBA		TBC
(Germany) Walkenhorst Motorsport	Aston Martin Vantage AMR GT3 Evo	34	TBA		TBC
(Germany) Walkenhorst Motorsport	Aston Martin Vantage AMR GT3 Evo	34	TBA		TBC
(Germany) Walkenhorst Motorsport	Aston Martin Vantage AMR GT3 Evo	35	TBA		TBC
(Germany) Walkenhorst Motorsport	Aston Martin Vantage AMR GT3 Evo	35	TBA		TBC
(Germany) Walkenhorst Motorsport	Aston Martin Vantage AMR GT3 Evo	35	TBA		TBC
(Austria) Team Motopark	Mercedes-AMG GT3 Evo	TBA	(South Africa) Jarrod Waberski	S	TBC
(Austria) Team Motopark	Mercedes-AMG GT3 Evo	TBA	(New Zealand) Ryan Yardley	S	TBC
(Austria) Team Motopark	Mercedes-AMG GT3 Evo	TBA	(China) Yu Kuai	S	TBC
(Austria) Team Motopark	Mercedes-AMG GT3 Evo	TBA	TBA	S	TBC
(Germany) GetSpeed	Mercedes-AMG GT3 Evo	TBA	(Germany) Jay Mo Härtling		TBC
(Germany) GetSpeed	Mercedes-AMG GT3 Evo	TBA	TBA		TBC
(Germany) GetSpeed	Mercedes-AMG GT3 Evo	TBA	TBA		TBC
TBA	TBA	TBA	(France) Leo Jousset		TBC
TBA	TBA	TBA	TBA		TBC
TBA	TBA	TBA	TBA		TBC

Icon	Class
P	Pro Cup
G	Gold Cup
S	Silver Cup
B	Bronze Cup
PA	Pro-Am Cup

== See also ==
- 2027 British GT Championship
- 2027 GT World Challenge Europe
- 2027 GT World Challenge Europe Sprint Cup
- 2027 GT World Challenge Asia
- 2027 GT World Challenge America
- 2027 GT World Challenge Australia
- 2027 Intercontinental GT Challenge
- 2027 GT3 Revival Series
