= 2027 Intercontinental GT Challenge =

Motorsport event

The 2027 Intercontinental GT Challenge will be the twelfth season of the Intercontinental GT Challenge. The season will begin with the Bathurst 12 Hour in Australia on 15 February and it is scheduled to conclude with the Suzuka 1000 km in Japan on 5 September.

== Calendar ==
The provisional calendar was released on 26 June 2026 at the SRO's annual 24 Hours of Spa press conference, featuring five rounds.

Also part of the GT World Challenge Europe
Also part of the GT World Challenge America
Also part of the Super GT Series (GT300 class)

Round	Race	Circuit	Date	Location
1	(Australia) Meguiar's Bathurst 12 Hour	Mount Panorama Circuit, Bathurst, New South Wales, Australia	11–14 February	2027 Intercontinental GT Challenge is located in Earth
2	(United States) Texas 8 Hour Presented by AWS	Circuit of the Americas, Austin, Texas, United States	7–9 May	2027 Intercontinental GT Challenge is located in Earth
3	(Germany) ADAC Ravenol Nürburgring 24 Hours	Nürburgring Nordschleife, Nürburg, Germany	27–30 May	2027 Intercontinental GT Challenge is located in Earth
4	(Belgium) CrowdStrike 24 Hours of Spa	Circuit de Spa-Francorchamps, Stavelot, Belgium	24–27 June	2027 Intercontinental GT Challenge is located in Earth
5	(Japan) Suzuka 1000 km	Suzuka International Racing Course, Suzuka, Mie Prefecture, Japan	4–5 September	2027 Intercontinental GT Challenge is located in Earth

== Entries ==
Manufacturer	Team	Car	No.	Drivers	Class	Rounds
Mercedes-AMG	(Australia) Scott Taylor Motorsport	Mercedes-AMG GT3 Evo	222	(Australia) Chaz Mostert	P	1
Mercedes-AMG	(Australia) Scott Taylor Motorsport	Mercedes-AMG GT3 Evo	222	(Australia) Thomas Randle	P	1
Mercedes-AMG	(Australia) Scott Taylor Motorsport	Mercedes-AMG GT3 Evo	222	(Australia) Cameron Waters	P	1

Icon	Class
P	Pro Cup
G	Gold Cup
S	Silver Cup
B	Bronze Cup
PA	Pro-Am Cup
Am	Am Cup
	Independent Cup

== See also ==
- 2027 British GT Championship
- 2027 GT World Challenge America
- 2027 GT World Challenge Asia
- 2027 GT World Challenge Australia
- 2027 GT World Challenge Europe Endurance Cup
- 2027 GT World Challenge Europe Sprint Cup
