= Grégoire Saucy =

Swiss racing driver (born 1999)

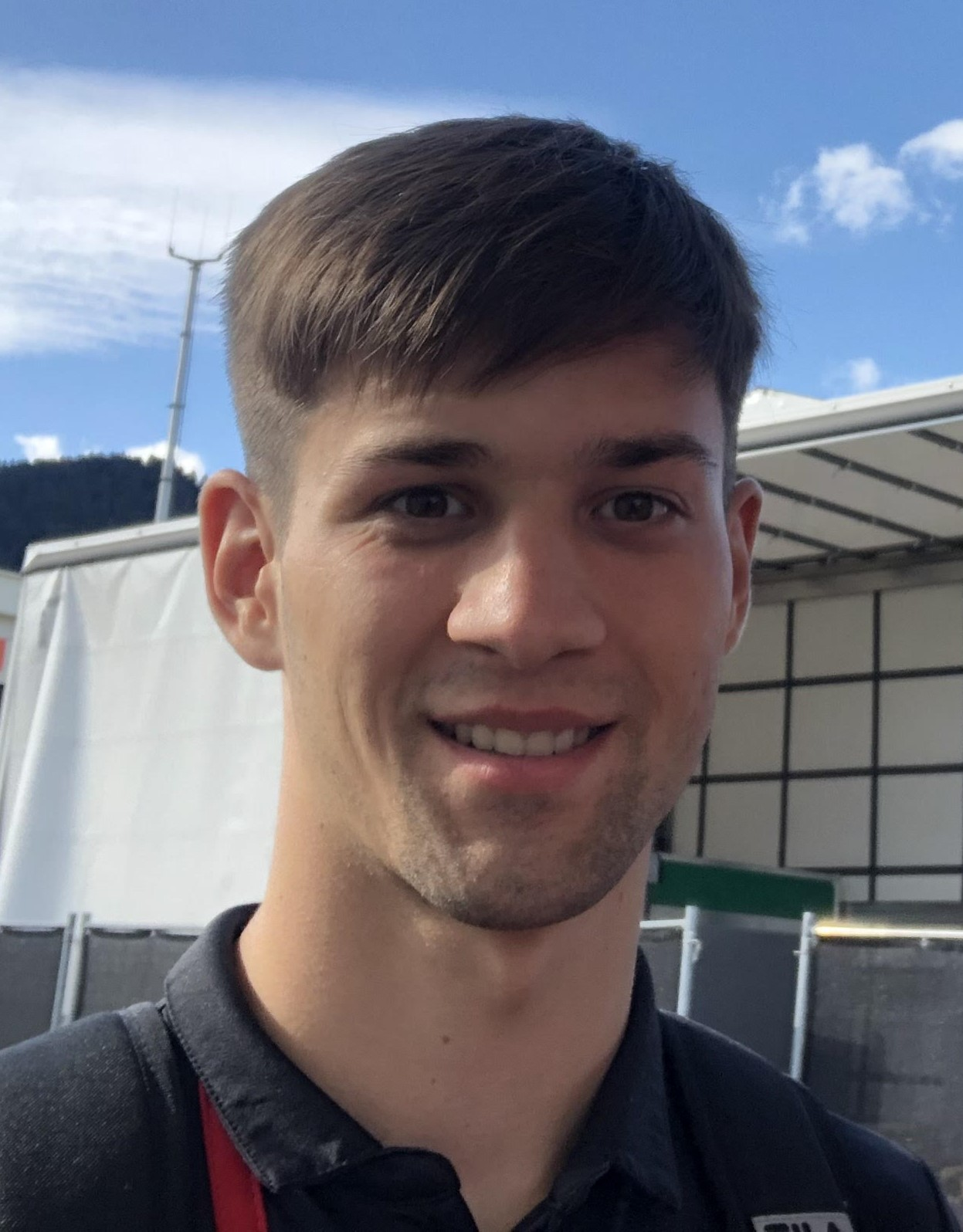
- Saucy at the 2022 Spielberg Formula 3 round
- Nationality: (Switzerland) Swiss
- Born: Grégoire Matthieu Saucy; 26 December 1999 (age 26) Bassecourt, Jura, Switzerland

European Le Mans Series career
- Debut season: 2024
- Current team: United Autosports
- Categorisation: FIA Gold
- Car number: 22
- Starts: 12
- Wins: 2
- Podiums: 4
- Poles: 1
- Fastest laps: 1
- Best finish: 4th in 2024

Previous series
- 2024–2025; 2022–2023; 2021; 2020; 2017–2020 (Note: The exact years Saucy competed in the Formula Renault Eurocup: 2017, 2019–2020); 2018–2019; 2017–2019; 2016: FIA WEC; FIA Formula 3; FR European; Toyota Racing Series; Formula Renault Eurocup; ADAC F4; Italian F4; V de V Monoplace

Championship titles
- 2021 2026: FR European Championship; European Le Mans Series - LMP2

Grégoire Matthieu Saucy (French pronunciation: [ɡʁe.ɡwaʁ so.si]; born 26 December 1999) is a Swiss racing driver who is set to compete in the FIA World Endurance Championship for McLaren. He previously competed in the European Le Mans Series for United Autosports. Saucy won the 2026 European Le Mans Series alongside Ben Hanley and Griffin Peebles.

Previously, Saucy competed in European junior single-seaters, winning the 2021 Formula Regional European Championship with ART.

== Junior career ==
=== V de V Challenge Monoplace ===
Saucy's first year in single seaters was in 2016 when he drove RC Formula and later GSK Grand Prix in the V de V Challenge Monoplace. The three podiums Saucy scored on his way to fourth in the championship were all second places in the three races at Circuit de Nevers Magny-Cours.

=== Formula 4 ===
==== 2017 ====
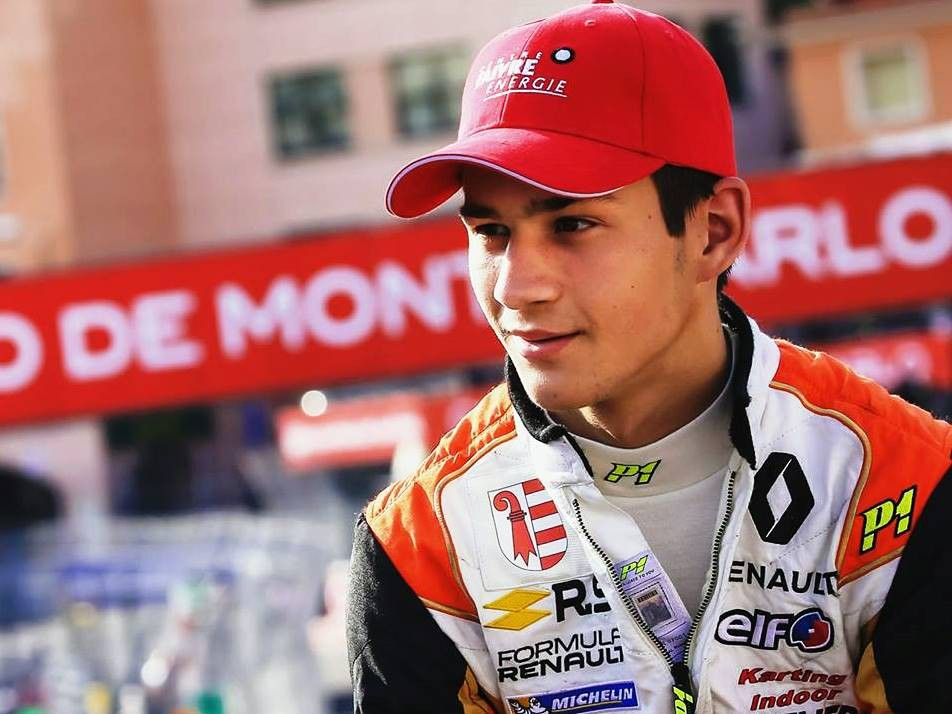
Saucy in 2017

Jenzer Motorsport signed Saucy to race for them 2017 as a guest driver in the Italian F4 Championship. In the six races he partook in, Saucy finished in points scoring positions twice both at Mugello Circuit.

==== 2018 ====
Saucy raced his first season in ADAC Formula 4 in 2018 where he raced as a guest driver for Jenzer Motorsport like he did the year previously in the Italian F4 championship. In the two races, he raced he finished 11th and fifth.

Saucy once again raced for Jenzer in Italian F4 until the final race of the season where he made the switch to the French team R-ace GP. His best result was fifth and he also scored a double pole position at round 3 in Monza, putting him 11th in the standings with 63 points.

==== 2019 ====
In 2019, Saucy contested the full ADAC Formula 4 season for R-ace GP. He finished on the podium twice in Zandvoort and Sachsenring, allowing him to end the season in ninth, 28 points behind his teammate Michael Belov.

Following on from the last race of 2018, Saucy drove for R-ace GP again in Italian F4 for selected rounds. He finished the season in 15th while only competing in three rounds; his highest finish being a fourth place at the Red Bull Ring.

=== Formula Renault Eurocup ===
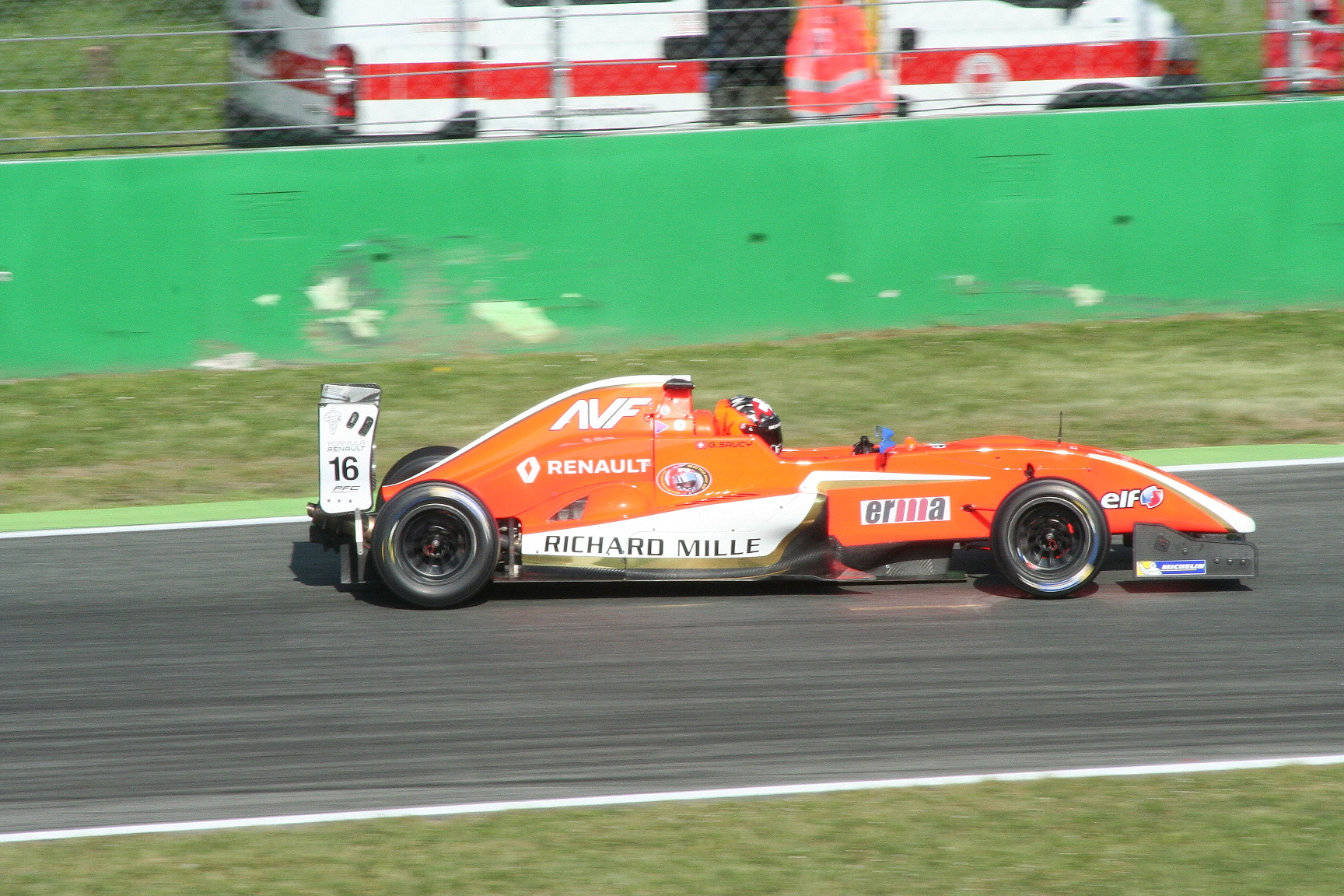
Saucy racing in the 2017 Formula Renault Eurocup

==== 2017 ====
Saucy's first year in Formula Renault was in 2017 when he raced for AVF by Adrián Vallés. He only competed in the first four rounds, and had a best finish of 12th in the championship.

==== 2019 ====
Saucy returned to Formula Renault Eurocup in 2019 for the final two rounds with R-ace GP. Competing as a guest driver, Saucy would finish fifth in his first race, and proceed to finish 12th in the remaining three races.

==== 2020 ====
In 2020, Saucy raced for ART Grand Prix alongside Paul Aron and Victor Martins. He secured his first podium at the Nürburgring where he came in third place, and finished third again in Spa-Francorchamps. With his two podiums, Saucy came seventh in the standings.

=== Toyota Racing Series ===
At the beginning of 2020, Saucy signed up to drive in the Toyota Racing Series with Giles Motorsport. Securing two second places in the campaign, he placed sixth in the standings.

=== Formula Regional European Championship ===
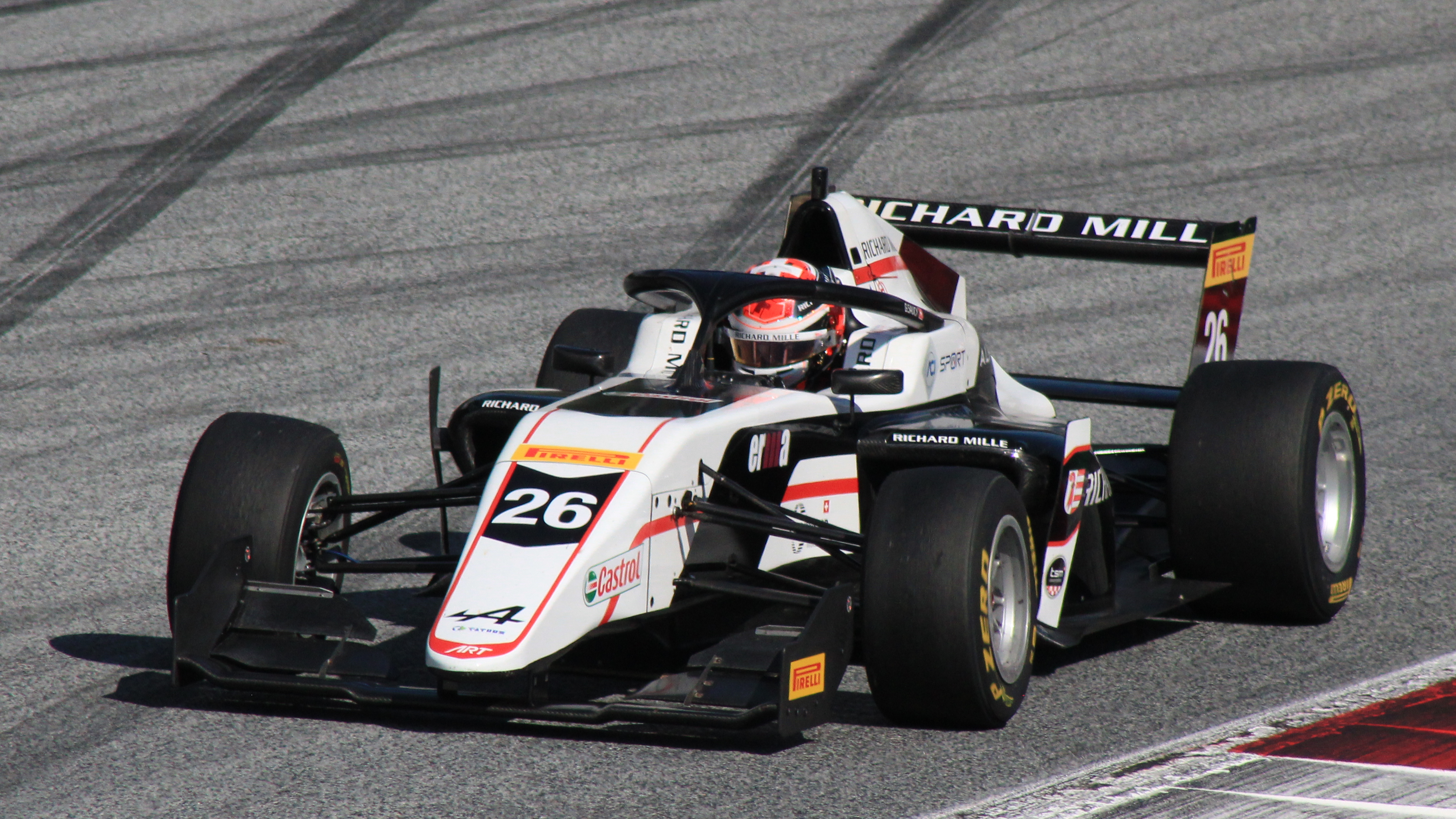
Saucy racing in the 2021 Formula Regional European Championship

For 2021, Saucy remained with ART Grand Prix competing in the Formula Regional European Championship by Alpine, the merger of the Formula Renault Eurocup and the Formula Regional European Championship. His teammates were Gabriele Minì and Thomas ten Brinke. He started the season off in a dominant fashion, winning the second race of the season at Imola and following that up with two victories in Barcelona. After a point-less round in Monaco and a disqualification from the lead in France, courtesy of a part having been reassembled in the wrong direction following post-race scrutineering, he returned to winning ways in the second race at Paul Ricard. Saucy dominated the next weekend at the Circuit Zandvoort with two pole positions and two race wins. Saucy started the first race at Spa-Francorchamps in 24th courtesy of a mixed-up qualifying session, but he was able to fight back to eighth by the checkered flag. He started the second race from pole and achieved his seventh victory of the season. In the seventh round of the campaign, Saucy once again scored a race win, this time inheriting the top step of the podium after a penalty was handed to initial winner Franco Colapinto for track limit breaches. Saucy scored his first podium that was not a win in the next round, coming third in race 2 in Valencia, and went into the penultimate round with a 78-point gap on his closest rival Hadrien David. He then finished the first race at Mugello in fifth place, and with his French adversary ending up 23rd, Saucy was crowned champion with three races left to go. Saucy ended the season with a total of eight victories, eight podiums, 277 points and ten podiums, meaning that he stood on the podium after precisely half of all races.

=== FIA Formula 3 Championship ===
==== 2022 ====
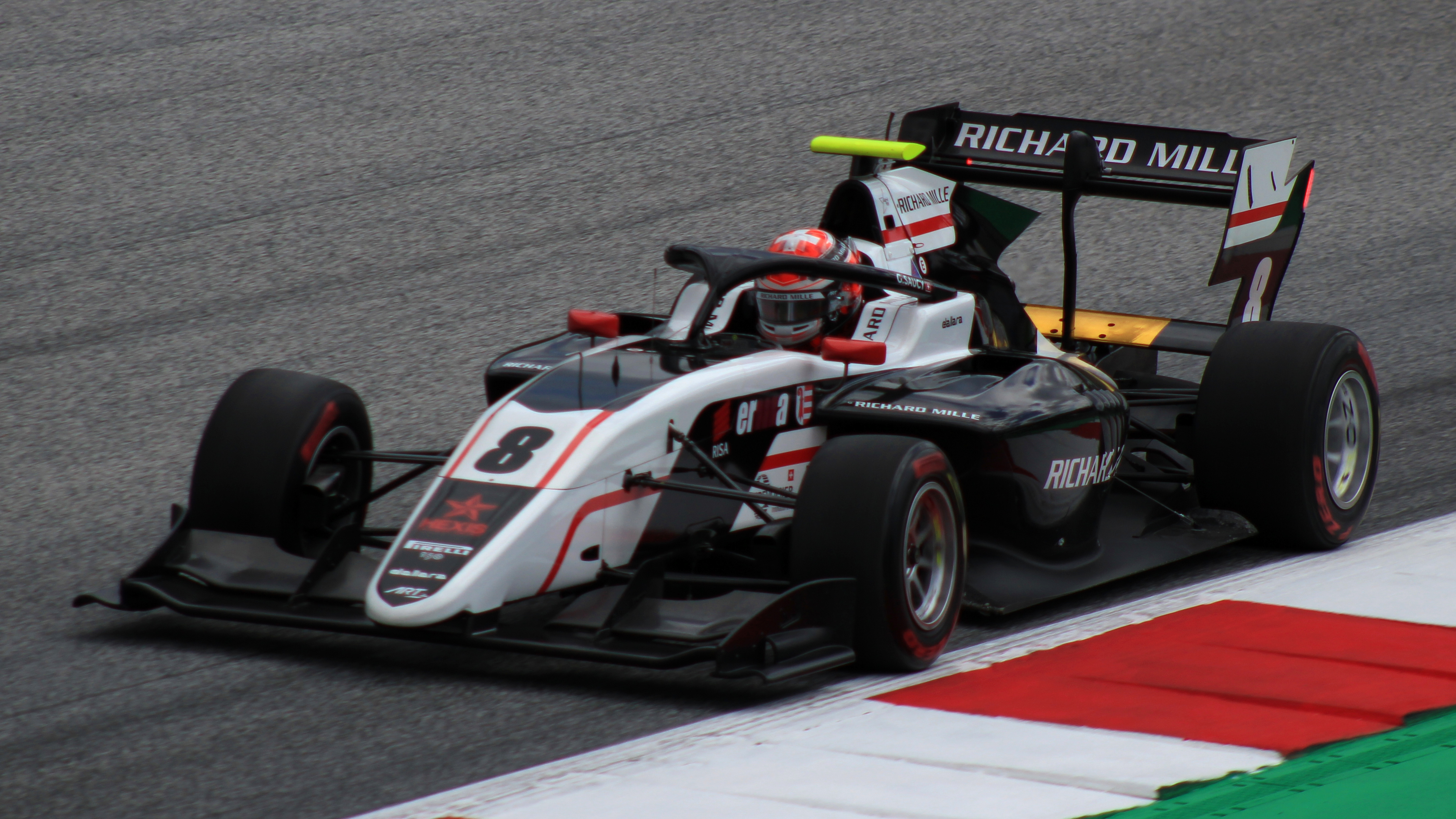
Saucy driving the Dallara F3 2019 during the 2022 Spielberg Formula 3 round.

In November 2021, Saucy partook in the post-season test of the FIA Formula 3 Championship with ART Grand Prix, partnering Victor Martins and Juan Manuel Correa. A few days after the test he was announced by ART to be one of the team's drivers for the 2022 season. He qualified fourth on his debut, beating both his teammates. After starting out the season with a retirement caused by a collision with teammate Martins, in which the Swiss was given a grid drop, Saucy scored his first podium in the category in the feature race in Sakhir. At the next round in Imola, he was on course for another third place, before being taken out by Oliver Bearman on the final lap. From there, Saucy experienced a drop in performances, having to wait until the sprint race in Hungary for his next points. He followed that up with an inconsistent end to the season, which included points finishes in Zandvoort and Monza, but also a pair of retirements, after which he stated that his results masked the underlying pace him and the team had. Saucy ended his season 15th in the standings, finishing behind his teammates Martins and Correa.

==== 2023 ====
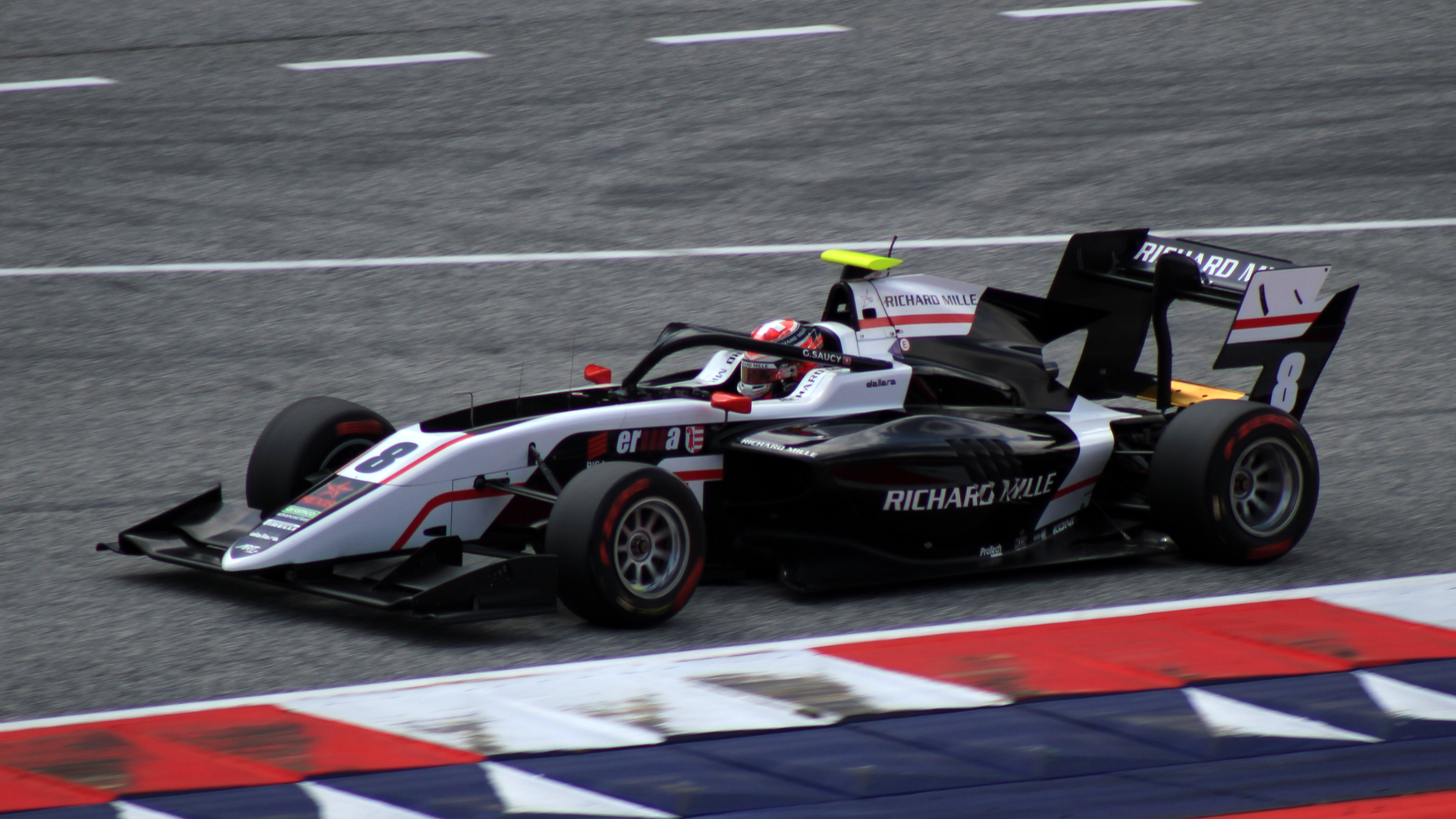
Saucy driving for ART Grand Prix during the 2023 Spielberg Formula 3 round.

In November 2022, ART Grand Prix announced Saucy would remain with the team for the 2023 season, where he would partner Kaylen Frederick and Nikola Tsolov. Qualifying third for the Bahrain round, he began the season with fourth in the feature race, and then improved to qualify on the front row in Melbourne. He would then convert it into his first podium of the year, remaining in second and marking him as a title contender. Another podium followed in the Monaco sprint race, despite been penalised from reverse pole. However, he suffered similar fortunes to the year before, only securing three more points finishes throughout the season. This was interrupted with a pole position in Austria, but was unable to capitalise after sustaining a puncture in the battle for the lead. His season, being plagued by numerous unlucky incidents, saw Saucy only 14th in the standings with 54 points, albeit the highest placed ART driver.

Saucy joined MP Motorsport for the final post-season testing in Imola.

== Sportscar career ==
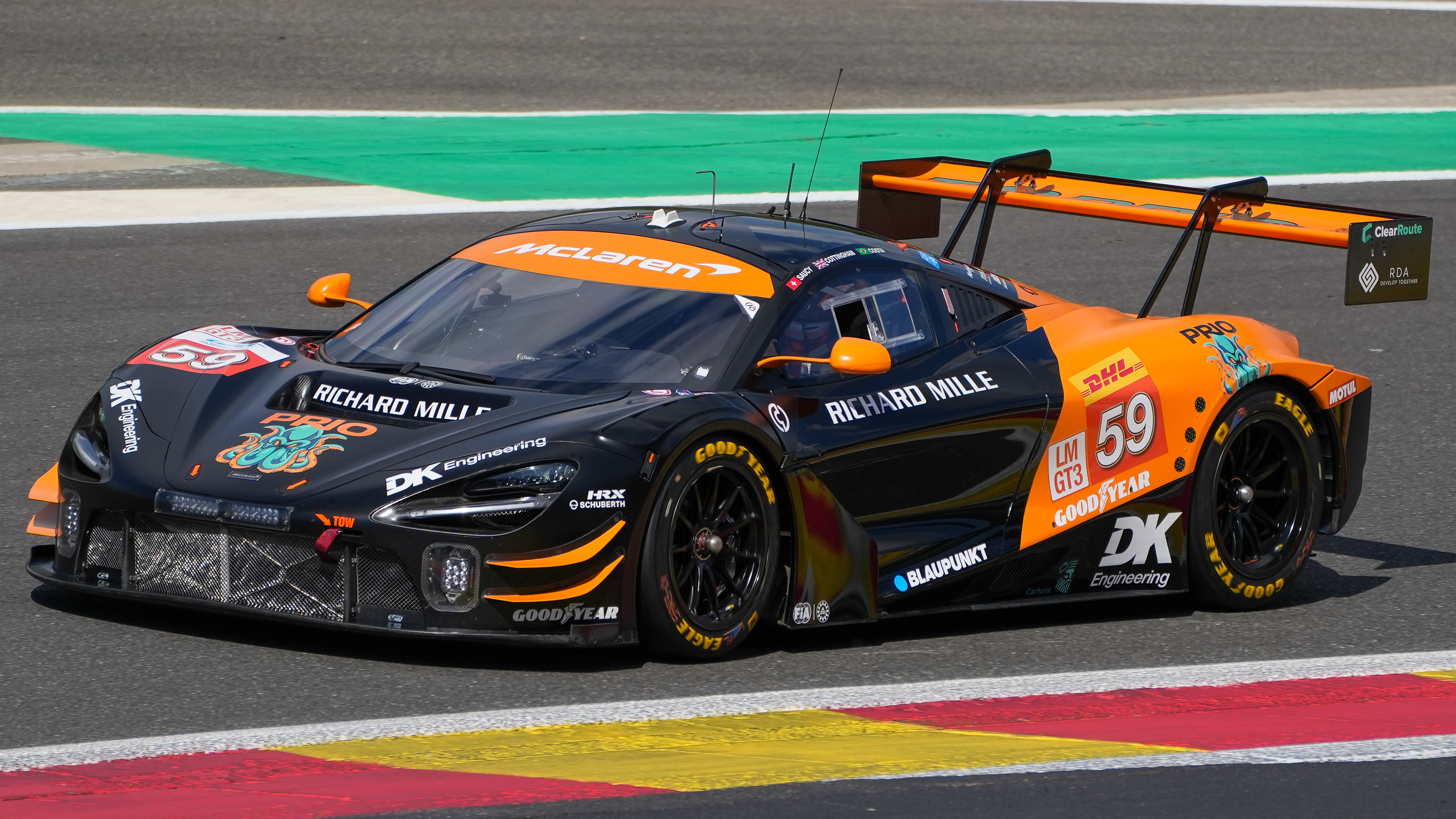
#59 McLaren 720S GT3 Evo from United Autosports at the 2024 6 Hours of Spa-Francorchamps driven by Saucy, Nicolas Costa and James Cottingham.

=== 2024: GT3 & LMP2 debut ===
After two disappointing seasons in FIA Formula 3, Saucy made the transition to endurance racing, racing for United Autosports in the 2024 FIA World Endurance Championship in the LMGT3 category. Saucy and his teammates started the campaign with two point-free events, but earned a fourth place during the Spa-Francochamps. Heartbreak followed in Le Mans when Saucy's car retired from an issue after being in podium contention. Nevertheless, Saucy followed that with two straight fourth places in São Paulo and Austin. After finishing sixth for the 8 Hours of Bahrain, Saucy and his teammates were classified ninth in the LMGT3 standings.

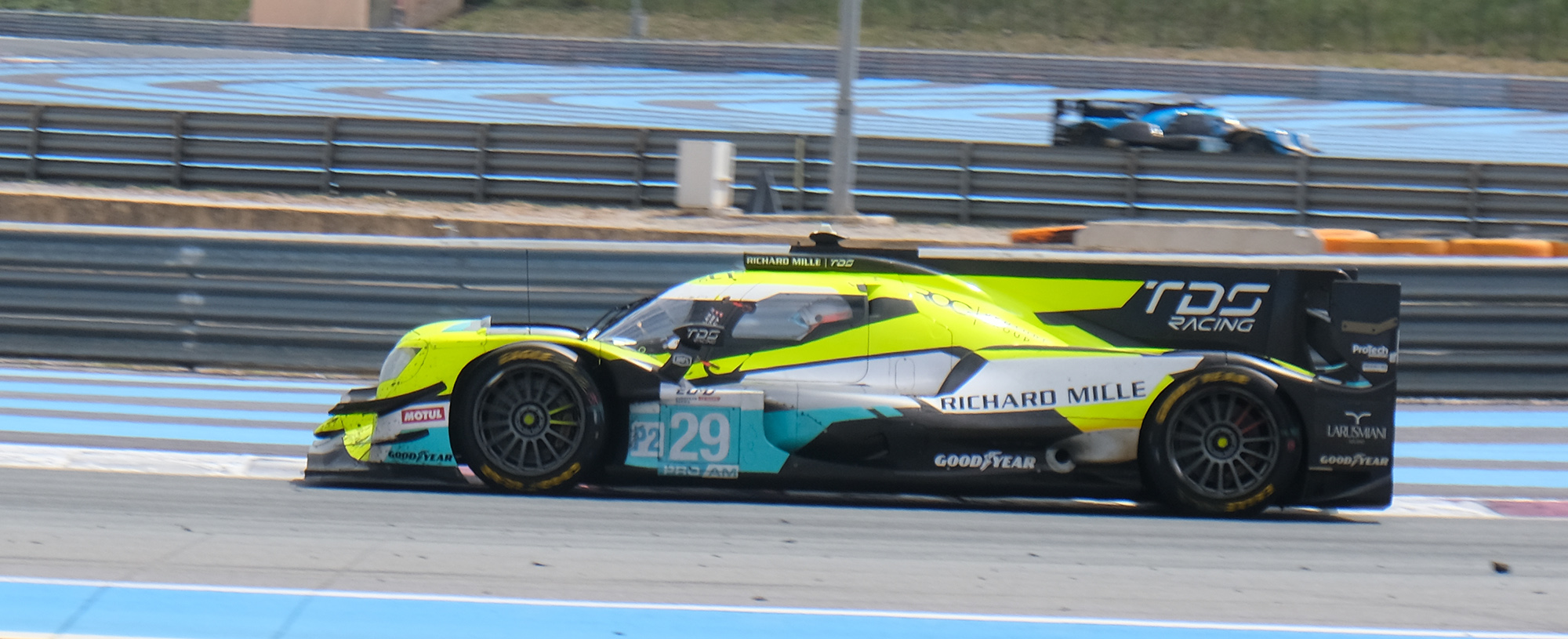
The #14 Oreca 07 from Richard Mille by TDS at the 2024 4 Hours of Le Castellet driven by Saucy, Mathias Beche and Rodrigo Sales.

That year, Saucy also teamed up with prototype stalwart Mathias Beche and bronze-ranked Rodrigo Sales in the LMP2 Pro-Am class of the European Le Mans Series with Richard Mille by TDS. Following a Pro-Am podium at the season-opener in Barcelona, Saucy and his teammates would go on to win at Le Castellet. He secured pole for the Spa-Francorchamps but retired after causing a collision with a GT car following a safety car restart. He then won once again during the 4 Hours of Mugello. Overall, it was a very successful season for Saucy and the team as they placed fourth in the LMP2 Pro-Am standings.

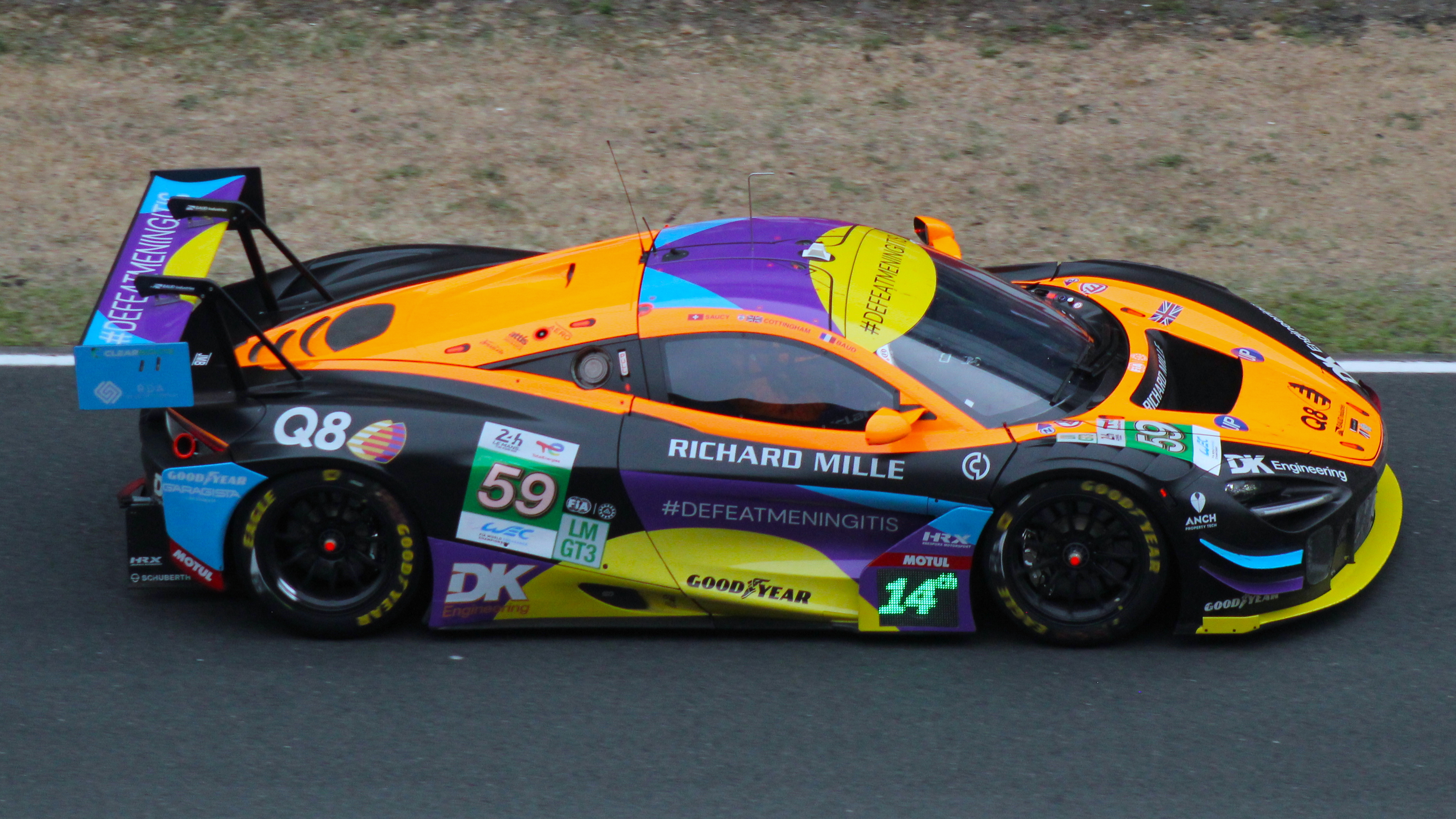
Saucy's No. 59 car at the 2025 24 Hours of Le Mans

=== 2025 ===
Saucy remained with United Autosports to race in the 2025 FIA World Endurance Championship in the LMGT3 category, and also drove for the team in the European Le Mans Series in the LMP2 category. His ELMS season was challenging, as Saucy scored a best class result of sixth at Barcelona as the No. 22 United entry finished 12th of 13 cars in the teams' standings. In the WEC, Saucy scored a best finish of second at Qatar, having chased the Corvette of Daniel Juncadella in the final stint but come up short.

At the end of the year, he also raced in the Asian Le Mans Series with the team, partnering Mikkel Jensen and Giorgio Roda. The trio finished seventh in the standings.

=== 2026: ELMS title and hypercar promotion ===
At the start of 2026, Saucy made his first appearance at the 24 Hours of Daytona, where he finished fourth in class for United Autosports. Saucy remained in the ELMS, continuing with United alongside Ben Hanley and Griffin Peebles. He also became a part of the McLaren Driver Development Programme.

After finishing third at the season opener in Barcelona, Saucy and his teammates won the 4 Hours of Le Castellet (with Saucy having qualified second) despite a late collision between Hanley and the chasing Reshad de Gerus. At Imola, Saucy ran first during the middle stints and fended off the No. 29 Forestier Racing by Panis entry of Oliver Gray, though United were subsequently undercut by Gray's teammate Esteban Masson; they went on to finish second. They finished fourth at Spa, as Saucy managed to avoid a spinning competitor during the third hour but lost three positions in the process. In a rain-affected race at Silverstone, the No. 22 United finished third in class while their title rivals Forestier placed ninth, giving Saucy and his teammates the championship lead. Saucy scored a dominant pole position ahead of the Portimão title decider, before United went on to win the LMP2 title by leading every lap of the race.

During the year, Saucy tested the McLaren MCL-HY hypercar on several occasions. In November 2026, it was announced that Saucy would join the team for their upcoming entry into the Hypercar class in the 2027 FIA World Endurance Championship.

== Other motorsports ==
=== Formula E ===
In May 2024, Saucy was chosen by the NEOM McLaren Formula E Team to partake in the Berlin rookie test.

== Karting record ==
=== Karting career summary ===
Season	Series	Team	Position
2008	Swiss Romand Championship — Mini		6th
2013	Swiss Championship — KF3	JD Racing	NC

== Racing record ==
=== Racing career summary ===
Season	Series	Team	Races	Wins	Poles	F/Laps	Podiums	Points	Position
2016	V de V Challenge Monoplace	RC Formula	3	0	0	0	0	661	4th
2016	V de V Challenge Monoplace	GSK Grand Prix	18	0	2	1	3	661	4th
2017	Formula Renault Eurocup	AVF by Adrián Vallés	4	0	0	0	0	0	26th
2017	Italian F4 Championship	Jenzer Motorsport	6	0	0	0	0	7	NC†
2018	ADAC Formula 4 Championship	Jenzer Motorsport	2	0	0	0	0	0	NC†
2018	Italian F4 Championship	Jenzer Motorsport	18	0	2	1	0	63	11th
2018	Italian F4 Championship	R-ace GP	3	0	0	0	0	63	11th
2019	Formula Renault Eurocup	R-ace GP	4	0	0	0	0	0	NC†
2019	Italian F4 Championship	R-ace GP	9	0	0	0	0	28	15th
2019	ADAC Formula 4 Championship	R-ace GP	20	0	0	0	2	95	9th
2020	Formula Renault Eurocup	ART Grand Prix	20	0	0	0	2	95.5	7th
2020	Toyota Racing Series	Giles Motorsport	15	0	0	0	2	220	6th
2021	Formula Regional European Championship	ART Grand Prix	20	8	8	2	10	277	**1st**
2022	FIA Formula 3 Championship	ART Grand Prix	18	0	0	0	1	30	15th
2023	FIA Formula 3 Championship	ART Grand Prix	18	0	1	2	2	54	14th
2024	FIA World Endurance Championship - LMGT3	United Autosports	8	0	0	0	0	52	9th
2024	European Le Mans Series - LMP2 Pro-Am	Richard Mille by TDS	6	2	0	1	4	94	4th
2025	FIA World Endurance Championship - LMGT3	United Autosports	8	0	0	0	1	43	12th
2025	European Le Mans Series - LMP2	United Autosports	6	0	0	0	0	15	14th
2025–26	Asian Le Mans Series - LMP2	United Autosports	6	0	0	0	0	37	7th
2026	IMSA SportsCar Championship - LMP2	United Autosports USA	1	0	0	0	0	310	35th
2026	European Le Mans Series - LMP2	United Autosports	6	2	1	0	5	110	**1st**
2026	24 Hours of Le Mans - LMP2	United Autosports	1	0	0	0	0	N/A	8th
2027	FIA World Endurance Championship – Hypercar	McLaren Hypercar Team	0	0	0	0	0	-	TBD

^{†} As Saucy was a guest driver, he was ineligible for points. ^{*} Season still in progress.

=== Complete V de V Challenge Monoplace results ===
(key) (Races in bold indicate pole position) (Races in italics indicate fastest lap)

Year	Team	1	2	3	4	5	6	7	8	9	10	11	12	13	14	15	16	17	18	19	20	21	DC	Points
2016	RC Formula	CAT; 1; 10	CAT; 2; 7	CAT; 3; 4																			4th	661
2016	GSK Grand Prix				BUG; 1; 9	BUG; 2; 17	BUG; 3; 7	**LEC**; **1** NC	LEC; 2; 4	LEC; 3; 7	ALC; 1; 4	ALC; 2; 5	ALC; 3; 4	MUG; 1; 5	**MUG**; **2**; 5	MUG; 3; 6	MAG; 1; 2	MAG; 2; 2	MAG; 3; 2	EST; 1; 7	EST; 2; 9	EST; 3 NC	4th	661

=== Complete Formula Renault Eurocup results ===
(key) (Races in bold indicate pole position) (Races in italics indicate fastest lap)

Year	Team	1	2	3	4	5	6	7	8	9	10	11	12	13	14	15	16	17	18	19	20	21	22	23	DC	Points
2017	AVF by Adrián Vallés	MNZ; 1; 12	MNZ; 2; 12	SIL; 1 Ret	SIL; 2 DNS	PAU; 1 DNS	PAU; 2 DNS	MON; 1; 20	MON; 2 DNS	HUN; 1	HUN; 2	HUN; 3	NÜR; 1	NÜR; 2	RBR; 1	RBR; 2	LEC; 1	LEC; 2	SPA; 1	SPA; 2	SPA; 3	CAT; 1	CAT; 2	CAT; 3	26th	0
2019	R-ace GP	MNZ; 1	MNZ; 2	SIL; 1	SIL; 2	MON; 1	MON; 2	LEC; 1	LEC; 2	SPA; 1	SPA; 2	NÜR; 1	NÜR; 2	HUN; 1	HUN; 2	CAT; 1	CAT; 2	HOC; 1; 5	HOC; 2; 12	YMC; 1; 12	YMC; 2; 12				NC†	0
2020	ART Grand Prix	MNZ; 1; 11	MNZ; 2; 8	IMO; 1; 14	IMO; 2; 13	NÜR; 1; 4	NÜR; 2; 3	MAG; 1; 4	MAG; 2; 6	ZAN; 1; 10	ZAN; 2; 8	CAT; 1; 4	CAT; 2 Ret	SPA; 1; 11‡	SPA; 2; 3	IMO; 1 Ret	IMO; 2; 7	HOC; 1 Ret	HOC; 2 Ret	LEC; 1; 7	LEC; 2; 15				7th	95.5

^{†} As Saucy was a guest driver, he was ineligible for points.
^{‡} Half points awarded as less than 75% of race distance was completed.

=== Complete Italian F4 Championship results ===
(key) (Races in bold indicate pole position) (Races in italics indicate fastest lap)

Year	Team	1	2	3	4	5	6	7	8	9	10	11	12	13	14	15	16	17	18	19	20	21	22	Pos	Points
2017	Jenzer Motorsport	MIS; 1	MIS; 2	MIS; 3	ADR; 1	ADR; 2	ADR; 3	VLL; 1	VLL; 2	VLL; 3	MUG1; 1	MUG1; 2	MUG1; 3	IMO; 1; 12	IMO; 2; 15	IMO; 3; 13	MUG2; 1; 10	MUG2; 2; 7	MUG2; 3; 12	MNZ; 1	MNZ; 2	MNZ; 3		NC†	7
2018	Jenzer Motorsport	ADR; 1; 12	ADR; 2; 5	ADR; 3; 5	LEC; 1 Ret	LEC; 2; 9	LEC; 3; 10	**MNZ**; **1**; 9	MNZ; 2; 19	**MNZ**; **3** Ret	MIS; 1; 9	MIS; 2; 7	MIS; 3; 23	IMO; 1; 11	IMO; 2; 27	IMO; 3; 5	VLL; 1; 13	VLL; 2; 6	VLL; 3; 8					11th	63
2018	R-ace GP																			MUG; 1 Ret	MUG; 2; 6	MUG; 3; 22		11th	63
2019	R-ace GP	VLL; 1; 20	VLL; 2 Ret	VLL; 3; 5	MIS; 1	MIS; 2	MIS; 3	HUN; 1; 31	HUN; 2; 14	HUN; 3; 14	RBR; 1; 8	RBR; 2; 4	RBR; 3; 9	IMO; 1	IMO; 2	IMO; 3	IMO; 4	MUG; 1	MUG; 2	MUG; 3	MNZ; 1	MNZ; 2	MNZ; 3	15th	28

^{†} As Saucy was a guest driver, he was ineligible for points.

=== Complete ADAC Formula 4 Championship results ===
(key) (Races in bold indicate pole position) (Races in italics indicate fastest lap)

Year	Team	1	2	3	4	5	6	7	8	9	10	11	12	13	14	15	16	17	18	19	20	Pos	Points
2018	Jenzer Motorsport	OSC; 1	OSC; 2	OSC; 3	HOC1; 1	HOC1; 2	HOC1; 3	LAU; 1	LAU; 2	LAU; 3	RBR; 1	RBR; 2	RBR; 3	HOC2; 1; 11	HOC2; 2; 5	NÜR; 1	NÜR; 2	NÜR; 3	HOC3; 1	HOC3; 2	HOC3; 3	NC†	0
2019	R-ace GP	OSC; 1; 13	OSC; 2; 6	OSC; 3; 6	RBR; 1; 16	RBR; 2; 16	RBR; 3; 10	HOC; 1; 19	HOC; 2; 10	ZAN; 1; 7	ZAN; 2; 6	ZAN; 3; 3	NÜR; 1; 9	NÜR; 2; 12	NÜR; 3; 9	HOC; 1; 5	HOC; 2; 11	HOC; 3; 10	SAC; 1; 3	SAC; 2; 4	SAC; 3 Ret	9th	95

^{†} As Saucy was a guest driver, he was ineligible for points.

=== Complete Toyota Racing Series results ===
(key) (Races in bold indicate pole position) (Races in italics indicate fastest lap)

Year	Team	1	2	3	4	5	6	7	8	9	10	11	12	13	14	15	DC	Points
2020	Giles Motorsport	HIG; 1; 4	HIG; 2; 4	HIG; 3; 5	TER; 1; 2	TER; 2; 9	TER; 3; 6	HMP; 1; 9	HMP; 2; 8	HMP; 3; 2	PUK; 1; 10	PUK; 2; 6	PUK; 3; 17	MAN; 1; 15	MAN; 2; 13	MAN; 3; 9	6th	220

=== Complete Formula Regional European Championship results ===
(key) (Races in bold indicate pole position) (Races in italics indicate fastest lap)

Year	Team	1	2	3	4	5	6	7	8	9	10	11	12	13	14	15	16	17	18	19	20	DC	Points
2021	ART Grand Prix	IMO; 1; 5	**IMO**; **2**; 1	**CAT**; **1**; 1	**CAT**; **2**; 1	MCO; 1; 22	MCO; 2 Ret	**LEC**; **1** DSQ	**LEC**; **2**; 1	**ZAN**; **1**; 1	**ZAN**; **2**; 1	SPA; 1; 8	**SPA**; **2**; 1	RBR; 1; 5	RBR; 2; 1	VAL; 1; 12	VAL; 2; 3	MUG; 1; 5	MUG; 2; 3	MNZ; 1; 4	MNZ; 2; 10	1st	277

=== Complete FIA Formula 3 Championship results ===
(key) (Races in bold indicate pole position) (Races in italics indicate points for the fastest lap of top ten finishers)

Year	Entrant	1	2	3	4	5	6	7	8	9	10	11	12	13	14	15	16	17	18	DC	Points
2022	ART Grand Prix	BHR; SPR; Ret	BHR; FEA; 3	IMO; SPR; Ret	IMO; FEA; 23†	CAT; SPR; 11	CAT; FEA; 11	SIL; SPR; 18	SIL; FEA; 25	RBR; SPR; 11	RBR; FEA; 14	HUN; SPR; 7	HUN; FEA; 11	SPA; SPR; 12	SPA; FEA; Ret	ZAN; SPR; 5	ZAN; FEA; Ret	MNZ; SPR; 6	MNZ; FEA; 28†	15th	30
2023	ART Grand Prix	BHR; SPR; 7	BHR; FEA; 4	MEL; SPR; 8	MEL; FEA; 2	MON; SPR; 3	MON; FEA; 10	CAT; SPR; 23	CAT; FEA; 27	RBR; SPR; 20	**RBR**; **FEA**; 27	SIL; SPR; 21	SIL; FEA; 9	HUN; SPR; 9	HUN; FEA; 15	SPA; SPR; 10	SPA; FEA; 20	MNZ; SPR; 22	MNZ; FEA; Ret	14th	54

=== Complete FIA World Endurance Championship results ===
(key) (Races in bold indicate pole position) (Races in italics indicate fastest lap)

Year	Entrant	Class	Car	Engine	1	2	3	4	5	6	7	8	Rank	Points
2024	United Autosports	LMGT3	McLaren 720S GT3 Evo	McLaren M840T 4.0 L Turbo V8	QAT; 14	IMO; 11	SPA; 4	LMS; Ret	SÃO; 4	COA; 4	FUJ; 8	BHR; 6	9th	52
2025	United Autosports	LMGT3	McLaren 720S GT3 Evo	McLaren M840T 4.0 L Turbo V8	QAT; 2	IMO; 14	SPA; 15	LMS; Ret	SÃO; 8	COA; 4	FUJ; 14	BHR; 16	12th	43

=== Complete European Le Mans Series results ===
(key) (Races in bold indicate pole position; results in italics indicate fastest lap)

Year	Entrant	Class	Chassis	Engine	1	2	3	4	5	6	Rank	Points
2024	Richard Mille by TDS	LMP2 Pro-Am	Oreca 07	Gibson GK428 4.2 L V8	CAT; 2	LEC; 1	IMO; 3	**SPA**; Ret	MUG; 1	ALG; 5	4th	94
2025	United Autosports	LMP2	Oreca 07	Gibson GK428 4.2 L V8	CAT; 6	LEC; 9	IMO; 8	SPA; Ret	SIL; 10	ALG; Ret	14th	15
2026	United Autosports	LMP2	Oreca 07	Gibson GK428 4.2 L V8	CAT; 3	LEC; 1	IMO; 2	SPA; 4	SIL; 3	ALG; 1	1st	110

=== Complete 24 Hours of Le Mans results ===
Year	Team	Co-Drivers	Car	Class	Laps	Pos.	Class Pos.
2024	(United Kingdom) United Autosports	(Brazil) Nicolas Costa (United Kingdom) James Cottingham	McLaren 720S GT3 Evo	LMGT3	220	DNF	DNF
2025	(United Kingdom) United Autosports	(France) Sébastien Baud (United Kingdom) James Cottingham	McLaren 720S GT3 Evo	LMGT3	314	DNF	DNF
2026	(United Kingdom) United Autosports	(Denmark) Mikkel Jensen (Sweden) Rasmus Lindh	Oreca 07-Gibson	LMP2	358	22nd	8th

=== Complete Asian Le Mans Series results ===
(key) (Races in bold indicate pole position) (Races in italics indicate fastest lap)

Year	Team	Class	Car	Engine	1	2	3	4	5	6	Pos.	Points
2025–26	United Autosports	LMP2	Oreca 07	Gibson GK428 4.2 L V8	**SEP**; **1**; 5	SEP; 2; 6	**DUB**; **1**; 6	**DUB**; **2** Ret	**ABU**; **1** Ret	**ABU**; **2**; 7	7th	37

=== Complete IMSA SportsCar Championship results ===
(key) (Races in bold indicate pole position; races in italics indicate fastest lap)

Year	Entrant	Class	Make	Engine	1	2	3	4	5	6	7	Rank	Points
2026	United Autosports USA	LMP2	Oreca 07	Gibson GK428 4.2 L V8	DAY; 4	SEB	WGL	MOS	ELK	IMS	PET	35th	310

== Notes ==
Sporting positions
Preceded by Gianluca Petecof	Formula Regional European Championship; Champion; 2021	Succeeded by Dino Beganovic
