= 2027 GT World Challenge Europe =

14th season of the GT World Challenge Europe

The 2027 GT World Challenge Powered by AWS is a planned motor racing championship for GT3 cars, marking the 14th edition of the GT World Challenge Europe. Organised by the SRO Motorsports Group, it will form the European part of the broader GT World Challenge, which will also include GT World Challenge America, GT World Challenge Australia and GT World Challenge Asia.

The championship will be split into the Endurance Cup and the Sprint Cup, each with its respective titles, alongside the overall GT World Challenge Europe championship. The season is set to take place over ten rounds at various European circuits. The annual season prologue, which serves as the championship's pre-season testing, along with testing for the 24 Hours of Spa, will have its dates confirmed later. Racing is set to commence in April and conclude in October.

== Calendar ==
All Sprint Cup rounds consist of two one-hour races, totalling 15 races throughout the season, alongside the single 3-hour (Imola, Nürburgring and Barcelona), 6-hour (Paul Ricard), or 24-hour (Spa) races in Endurance Cup rounds.

Round	Circuit	Date	Series	Map
1	(France) Circuit Paul Ricard	15–18 April	Endurance	2027 GT World Challenge Europe is located in Europe
2	(United Kingdom) Brands Hatch	1–2 May	Sprint	2027 GT World Challenge Europe is located in Europe
3	(Italy) Imola Circuit	21–23 May	Endurance	2027 GT World Challenge Europe is located in Europe
4	(Belgium) Circuit de Spa-Francorchamps	24–27 June	Endurance	2027 GT World Challenge Europe is located in Europe
5	(Italy) Misano World Circuit	16–18 July	Sprint	2027 GT World Challenge Europe is located in Europe
6	(France) Circuit de Nevers Magny-Cours	30 July – 1 August	Sprint	2027 GT World Challenge Europe is located in Europe
7	(Germany) Nürburgring	27–29 August	Endurance	2027 GT World Challenge Europe is located in Europe
8	(Netherlands) Circuit Zandvoort	17–19 September	Sprint	2027 GT World Challenge Europe is located in Europe
9	(Hungary) Hungaroring	1–3 October	Sprint	2027 GT World Challenge Europe is located in Europe
10	(Spain) Circuit de Barcelona-Catalunya	22–24 October	Endurance	2027 GT World Challenge Europe is located in Europe

=== Calendar changes ===
The 2027 calendar for the GT World Challenge features two significant venue changes compared to 2026. Firstly, Imola will return in place of Monza, which is undergoing renovation. Later in the year, round nine will be hosted by the Hungaroring, meaning that Portimão will be dropped after its return the previous year. Beyond these changes, the calendar remains largely unchanged, except that Barcelona hosts an Endurance Cup rather than a Sprint Cup round, as was the case in 2026.

== Entries ==
=== Sprint Cup ===
Team	Car	Engine	No.	Class	Drivers	Rounds
(Germany) Walkenhorst Motorsport	Aston Martin Vantage AMR GT3 Evo	Aston Martin M177 4.0 L Turbo V8	TBC	TBC	TBA	TBC
(Germany) Walkenhorst Motorsport	Aston Martin Vantage AMR GT3 Evo	Aston Martin M177 4.0 L Turbo V8	TBC	TBC	TBA	TBC
(Germany) Walkenhorst Motorsport	Aston Martin Vantage AMR GT3 Evo	Aston Martin M177 4.0 L Turbo V8	TBC	TBC	TBA	TBC
(Germany) Walkenhorst Motorsport	Aston Martin Vantage AMR GT3 Evo	Aston Martin M177 4.0 L Turbo V8	TBC	TBC	TBA	TBC

Icon	Class
P	Pro (Overall)
G	Gold Cup
S	Silver Cup
B	Bronze Cup

=== Endurance Cup ===
Team	Car	Engine	No.	Class	Drivers	Rounds
(Germany) GetSpeed	Mercedes-AMG GT3 Evo	Mercedes-AMG M159 6.2 L V8	TBC	S	(Germany) Jay Mo Härtling	TBC
(Germany) GetSpeed	Mercedes-AMG GT3 Evo	Mercedes-AMG M159 6.2 L V8	TBC	S	TBA	TBC
(Germany) GetSpeed	Mercedes-AMG GT3 Evo	Mercedes-AMG M159 6.2 L V8	TBC	S	TBA	TBC
(Germany) Team Motopark	Mercedes-AMG GT3 Evo	Mercedes-AMG M159 6.2 L V8	TBC	S	(China) Yu Kuai	TBC
(Germany) Team Motopark	Mercedes-AMG GT3 Evo	Mercedes-AMG M159 6.2 L V8	TBC	S	(South Africa) Jarrod Waberski	TBC
(Germany) Team Motopark	Mercedes-AMG GT3 Evo	Mercedes-AMG M159 6.2 L V8	TBC	S	(New Zealand) Ryan Yardley	TBC
(Germany) Team Motopark	Mercedes-AMG GT3 Evo	Mercedes-AMG M159 6.2 L V8	TBC	S	TBA	TBC
(Germany) Walkenhorst Motorsport	Aston Martin Vantage AMR GT3 Evo	Aston Martin M177 4.0 L Turbo V8	TBC	TBC	TBA	TBC
(Germany) Walkenhorst Motorsport	Aston Martin Vantage AMR GT3 Evo	Aston Martin M177 4.0 L Turbo V8	TBC	TBC	TBA	TBC
(Germany) Walkenhorst Motorsport	Aston Martin Vantage AMR GT3 Evo	Aston Martin M177 4.0 L Turbo V8	TBC	TBC	TBA	TBC
(Germany) Walkenhorst Motorsport	Aston Martin Vantage AMR GT3 Evo	Aston Martin M177 4.0 L Turbo V8	TBC	TBC	TBA	TBC
(Germany) Walkenhorst Motorsport	Aston Martin Vantage AMR GT3 Evo	Aston Martin M177 4.0 L Turbo V8	TBC	TBC	TBA	TBC
(Germany) Walkenhorst Motorsport	Aston Martin Vantage AMR GT3 Evo	Aston Martin M177 4.0 L Turbo V8	TBC	TBC	TBA	TBC

Icon	Class
P	Pro (Overall)
G	Gold Cup
S	Silver Cup
B	Bronze Cup

== See also ==
- 2027 Intercontinental GT Challenge
- 2027 GT World Challenge Europe Endurance Cup
- 2027 GT World Challenge Europe Sprint Cup
- 2027 GT World Challenge Asia
- 2027 GT World Challenge America
- 2027 GT World Challenge Australia
- 2027 British GT Championship
- 2027 SRO Japan Cup
- 2027 GT America Series
- 2027 GT3 Revival Series
