= 2027 GT World Challenge Australia =

Australian motorsport championship season

The 2027 GT World Challenge Australia Powered by AWS is a planned Australian motorsport competition for GT3 cars. It is planned to be the fourth season since the SRO Motorsports Group took over sole management of the series. The season is planned to start at Phillip Island on 16 April, and end at the Adelaide Street Circuit on 28 November.

== Calendar ==
The first five out of six rounds on the calendar were announced during the 2026 SRO Press conference at the 2026 24 Hours of Spa. Hidden Valley Raceway will be dropped from the schedule after a single season, replaced by Mount Panorama Circuit which returns to the calendar for the first time since 2024. The calendar was finalised on 5th November 2026, with the final round confirmed to take place on the Adelaide Street Circuit for a second season in a row, and Round 4 at Queensland Raceway moving back one weekend from September 17-19 to September 24-26.

Round	Circuit	City / State	Date	Map
1	(Victoria (state)) Phillip Island Grand Prix Circuit	Phillip Island, Victoria	16–18 April	2027 GT World Challenge Australia is located in Australia
2	(South Australia) The Bend Motorsport Park	Tailem Bend, South Australia	28–30 May	2027 GT World Challenge Australia is located in Australia
3	(New South Wales) Sydney Motorsport Park	Eastern Creek, New South Wales	23–25 July	2027 GT World Challenge Australia is located in Australia
4	Queensland Raceway	Ipswich, Queensland	24–26 September	2027 GT World Challenge Australia is located in Australia
5	(New South Wales) Mount Panorama Circuit	Bathurst, New South Wales	29–31 October	2027 GT World Challenge Australia is located in Australia
6	(South Australia) Adelaide Street Circuit	Adelaide, South Australia	25–28 November	2027 GT World Challenge Australia is located in Australia

== Entry list ==
Team	Car	Engine	No.	Drivers	Class	Rounds

Icon	Class
PA	Pro-Am Cup
Am	Am Cup
T	Trophy Cup
	GT Academy Entrant

== Race results ==
Bold indicates the overall winner.

Round		Circuit	Pole Position	Pro-Am Winners	Am Winners	Trophy Winners
1	R1	(Victoria (state)) Phillip Island				
1	R2	(Victoria (state)) Phillip Island				
2	R1	(South Australia) The Bend				
2	R2	(South Australia) The Bend				
3	R1	(New South Wales) Sydney				
3	R2	(New South Wales) Sydney				
4	R1	Queensland				
4	R2	Queensland				
5	R1	(New South Wales) Bathurst				
5	R2	(New South Wales) Bathurst				
6	R1	(South Australia) Adelaide				
6	R2	(South Australia) Adelaide				

== Championship standings ==
Scoring system

Position	**1st**	**2nd**	**3rd**	**4th**	**5th**	**6th**	**7th**	**8th**	**9th**	**10th**	**Pole**
Points	25	18	15	12	10	8	6	4	2	1	1

== See also ==
- 2027 British GT Championship
- 2027 GT World Challenge Europe
- 2027 GT World Challenge Europe Endurance Cup
- 2027 GT World Challenge Europe Sprint Cup
- 2027 GT World Challenge Asia
- 2027 GT World Challenge America
- 2027 Intercontinental GT Challenge
- 2027 Bathurst 12 Hour
