= 2027 GT World Challenge Europe Sprint Cup =

Motorsport season

The 2027 GT World Challenge Europe Sprint Cup is the fifteenth season of the GT World Challenge Europe Sprint Cup following on from the demise of the SRO Motorsports Group's FIA GT1 World Championship (an auto racing series for grand tourer cars). The season will begin on 1 May at Brands Hatch and will finish on 3 October at the Hungaroring which will make a return to GTWC for the first time since 2019.

== Calendar ==
The provisional calendar was released on 26 June 2026 at the SRO's annual 24 Hours of Spa press conference, featuring five rounds.

Round	Circuit	Date	Map
1	(United Kingdom) Brands Hatch, Kent	1–2 May	2027 GT World Challenge Europe Sprint Cup is located in Europe
2	(Italy) Misano World Circuit Marco Simoncelli, Misano Adriatico	16–18 July	2027 GT World Challenge Europe Sprint Cup is located in Europe
3	(France) Circuit de Nevers Magny-Cours, Magny-Cours	30 July–1 August	2027 GT World Challenge Europe Sprint Cup is located in Europe
4	(Netherlands) Circuit Zandvoort, Zandvoort	17–19 September	2027 GT World Challenge Europe Sprint Cup is located in Europe
5	(Hungary) Hungaroring, Mogyoród	1–3 October	2027 GT World Challenge Europe Sprint Cup is located in Europe

== Entry list ==
Team	Car	No.	Drivers	Class	Rounds

Icon	Class
P	Pro Cup
G	Gold Cup
S	Silver Cup
B	Bronze Cup

== See also ==
- 2027 British GT Championship
- 2027 GT World Challenge Europe
- 2027 GT World Challenge Europe Endurance Cup
- 2027 GT World Challenge Asia
- 2027 GT World Challenge America
- 2027 GT World Challenge Australia
- 2027 Intercontinental GT Challenge
- 2027 GT3 Revival Series
