= 2027 Super GT Series =

Sports car racing season in Japan

The 2027 Super GT Series is a motor racing championship based in Japan for grand touring cars, which will be the thirty-fifth season of the Super GT series, tracing its lineage to the All Japan Grand Touring Car Championship era. It will be the twenty-third season for the series under the Super GT name, and the forty-fifth season of a Japan Automobile Federation (JAF) national sportscar championship, dating back to the All Japan Endurance/Sports Prototype Championship.

== Calendar ==
The provisional calendar for 2027 was confirmed on 31 July 2026, which consists of eight races. The GTA further announced the return of Suzuka 1000 km to the Super GT calendar, which only for the GT300 class to participate alongside other Intercontinental GT Challenge teams.

Round		Race	Circuit	Location	Dates
GT500	GT300	Race	Circuit	Location	Dates
1		Okayama GT 300 km Race	(Okayama Prefecture) Okayama International Circuit	Mimasaka, Okayama Prefecture	3–4 April
2		Fuji GT 3 Hours Race GW Special	(Shizuoka Prefecture) Fuji Speedway	Oyama, Shizuoka Prefecture	3–4 May
3		Sepang GT 300 km Race	(Malaysia) Sepang International Circuit	Sepang, Selangor, Malaysia	18–19 June
4		Suzuka GT 300 km Race	(Mie Prefecture) Suzuka Circuit	Suzuka, Mie Prefecture	31 July–1 August
—	5	Suzuka 1000 km	(Mie Prefecture) Suzuka Circuit	Suzuka, Mie Prefecture	4–5 September
5	6	Sugo GT 300 km Race	(Miyagi Prefecture) Sportsland Sugo	Murata, Miyagi Prefecture	18–19 September
6	7	Autopolis GT 3 Hours Race	(Ōita Prefecture) Autopolis	Hita, Oita Prefecture	16–17 October
7	8	Fuji GT 300 km Race	(Shizuoka Prefecture) Fuji Speedway	Oyama, Shizuoka Prefecture	6–7 November
8	9	Motegi GT 300 km Race	(Tochigi Prefecture) Mobility Resort Motegi	Motegi, Tochigi Prefecture	20–21 November

== Teams and drivers ==
On 19 October 2025, it was announced that the 2026 season would be the last with different tire manufacturers competing against one another. The series will switch to a single tire manufacturer in each class for the 2027 season.

=== GT500 ===
All teams will compete with tyres supplied by Bridgestone.

=== GT300 ===
All teams will compete with tyres supplied by Dunlop, as for the IGTC teams compete in Suzuka 1000km will compete with tyres supplied by Pirelli.

==== GT300 entrant changes ====
- Zak O'Sullivan to leave the series after two years to compete for Envision Racing in Formula E.
- Three-times GT300 champion, Morio Nitta retired from the series after competed for 30 years from 1996. Two-times GT300 champion, Manabu Orido also joins Nitta, as he retired from the series after competed for 29 years.

== Results ==
Drivers credited with winning Pole Position for their respective teams are indicated in bold text.

Round	Circuit	GT500 Pole position	GT500 Race winner	Round	GT300 Pole position	GT300 Race winner
1	(Okayama Prefecture) Okayama 300 km			1		
2	(Shizuoka Prefecture) Fuji 3 Hours			2		
3	(Malaysia) Sepang 300 km			4		
4	(Mie Prefecture) Suzuka 300 km			4		
–	(Mie Prefecture) Suzuka 1000 km	Did not participate		5		
5	(Miyagi Prefecture) Sugo 300 km			6		
6	(Ōita Prefecture) Autopolis 3 Hours			7		
7	(Shizuoka Prefecture) Fuji 300 km			8		
8	(Tochigi Prefecture) Motegi Race 1			9		
