= McLaren MCL-HY =

Sports prototype racing car

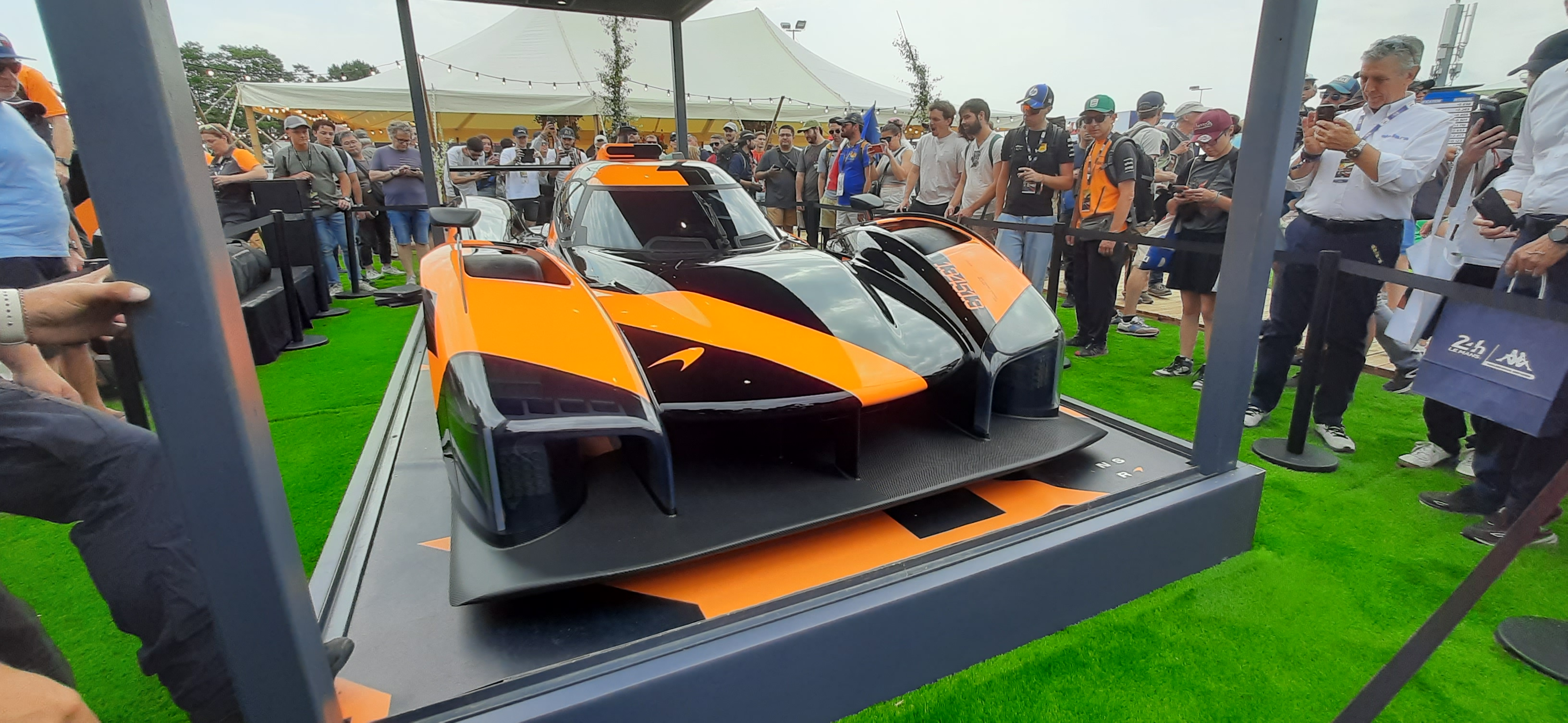
- The full-scale model of an MCL-HY prototype on display in 2025
- Category: Le Mans Daytona h
- Constructor: McLaren (Dallara)
- Designers: Chris Dyer (technical director); Alex Alexiev (exterior designer); Neil Oatley (design consultant)
- Predecessor: McLaren F1 GTR

Technical specifications
- Chassis: LMP2-based carbon fibre monocoque
- Suspension: Double wishbones, pushrods actuated springs and dampers, anti-roll bar
- Engine: Autotecnica Motori 2.9 L (177.0 cu in) 90° V6 twin turbocharged mid-engine
- Transmission: 7-speed
- Power: 697 hp (520 kW; 707 PS)
- Weight: 1,030 kg (2,271 lb)
- Fuel: TotalEnergies (WEC)
- Lubricants: Motul
- Brakes: Ventilated carbon ceramic discs
- Tyres: Michelin

Competition history
- Notable entrants: (United Kingdom) (United States) McLaren United AS

The McLaren MCL-HY is an upcoming LMDh sports prototype designed by McLaren and built by Dallara to compete in the Hypercar category in the 2027 FIA World Endurance Championship.

== Background ==
On 10 April 2025, McLaren declared their intentions to compete in the Hypercar class in the 2027 FIA World Endurance Championship. On 13 June, they shared details of their programme, confirming Dallara as the chassis supplier, Autotecnica Motori as the engine manufacturer, and United Autosports as the team to run their cars in the series. A full-scale concept model of the car was displayed at the 2025 24 Hours of Le Mans. Shortly after the unveiling, McLaren confirmed simultaneous production of a track-only equivalent of the race car given to select customers for use in organized track day events, launching the "Project: Endurance" programme.

McLaren presented a revised version of the car eleven months later on 4 May 2026 ahead of private track testing, now carrying the name MCL-HY, in line with their Formula One cars which also carry the "MCL" prefix. Mikkel Jensen, Grégoire Saucy, Richard Verschoor, and Ben Hanley were confirmed to take part in the testing program.

=== McLaren MCL-HY GTR ===
As part of the "Project: Endurance" customer programme, McLaren is set to develop the MCL-HY GTR, a track-only version of the MCL-HY. It is developed in-house simultaneously with the race car by McLaren, but will be sold to select customers under their automobile manufacturing counterpart McLaren Automotive. The MCL-HY GTR retains the same technical specifications as the race car.
