= Texas 8 Hour =

Sports car race held in Long Beach, California

Intercontinental GT Challenge
- Venue: Circuit of the Americas
- First race: 2027
- First IGTC race: 2027
- Duration: 8 Hours

The Texas 8 Hour is an upcoming endurance sports car race that will be contested at the Circuit of the Americas. The event is the US leg of the Intercontinental GT Challenge (IGTC) and a round of the GT World Challenge America series.

== History ==
On June 26, 2026, at the SRO Motorsports Group's annual 24 Hours of Spa press conference, it was announced that Circuit of the Americas would replace Indianapolis as the Intercontinental GT Challenge race in the United States. CEO Stéphane Ratel stated that "there was a possibility of repaving of the track that may put our event in danger" which forced the SRO to move the event.

== See also ==
- Intercontinental GT Challenge
