= 2027 GT3 Revival Series =

Sports car racing series edition

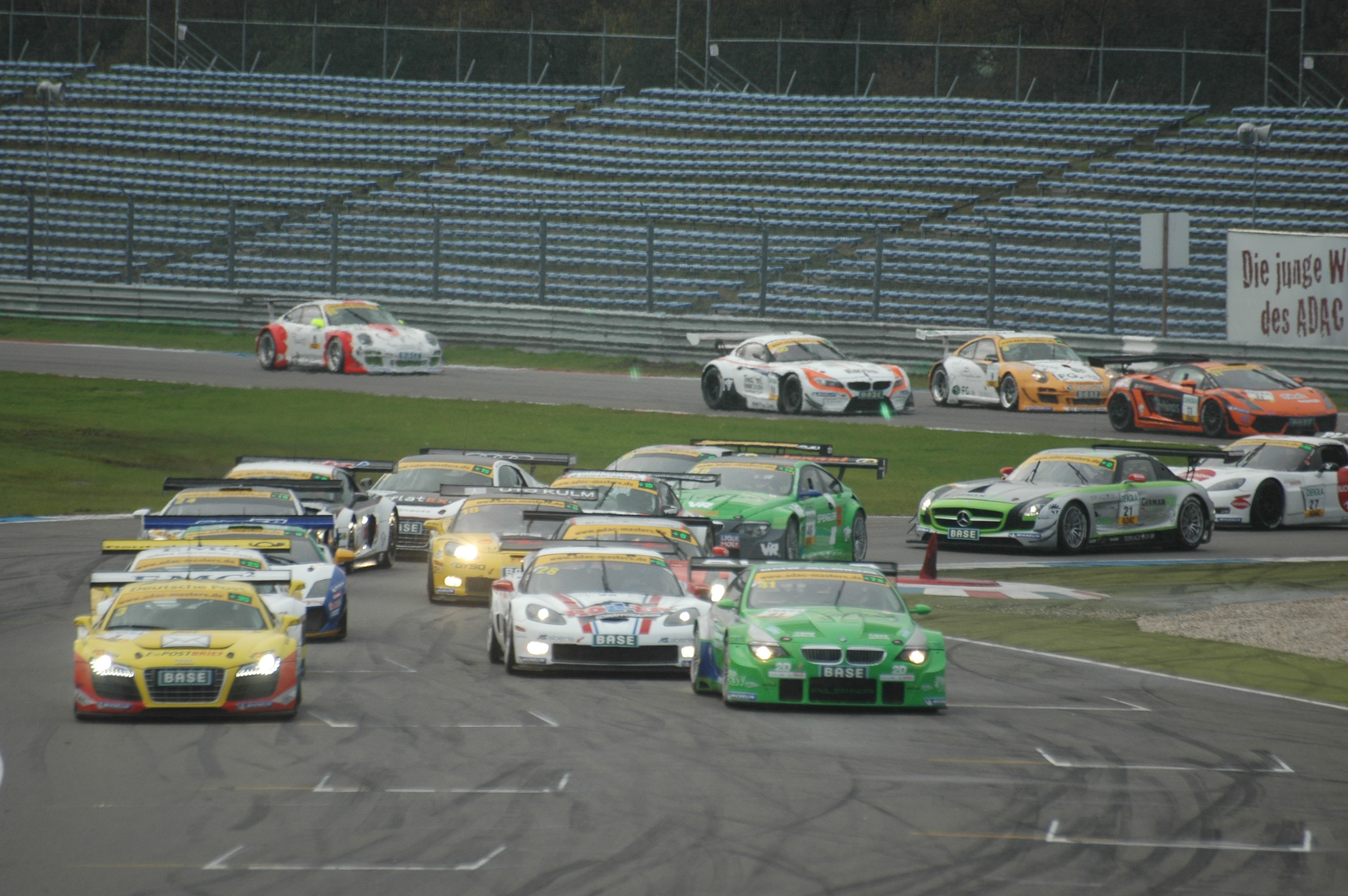
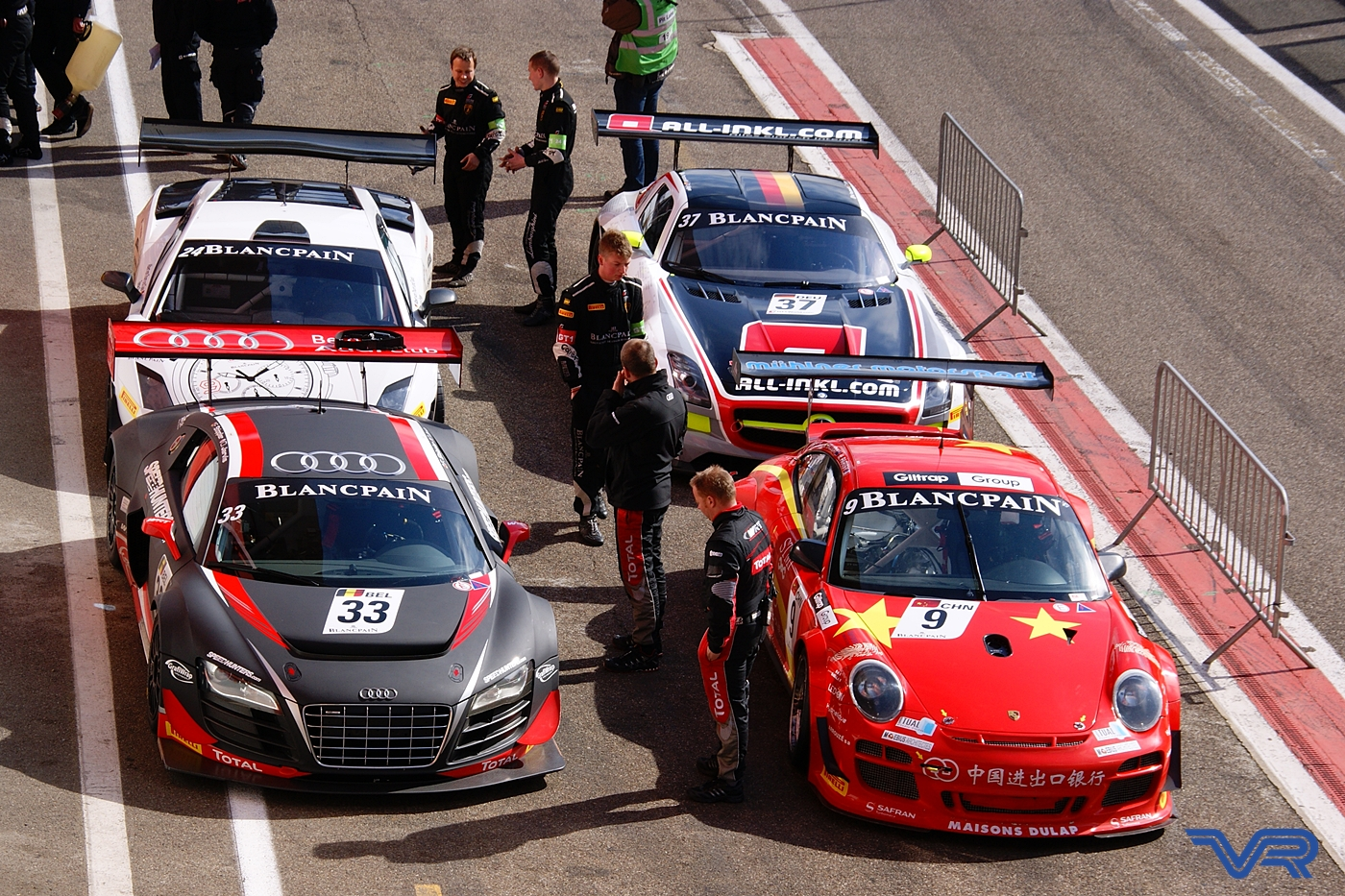
A group of cars at the TT Circuit Assen and Circuit Zolder, featuring cars that are eligible for the series

The 2027 GT3 Revival Series is planned to be the second season of the GT3 Revival Series. The races will be contested with GT3-spec cars that were homologated from 2006 through to 2013.

The season will begin on 2 April at Circuit de Barcelona-Catalunya, and end on 3 October at the Hungaroring.

== Calendar ==
The calendar was confirmed on 18 September 2026, featuring five rounds. Circuit de Barcelona-Catalunya, Circuit de Spa-Francorchamps, and Le Castellet retain their spots on the calendar, while the rounds at Le Mans and the Nürburgring are replaced with rounds at Dijon-Prenois and the Hungaroring.

Round	Circuit	Date	Map
1	Circuit de Barcelona-Catalunya, Montmeló, Spain	2–4 April	2027 GT3 Revival Series is located in Europe
2	Dijon-Prenois, Prenois, France	7–9 May	2027 GT3 Revival Series is located in Europe
3	Circuit de Spa-Francorchamps, Stavelot, Belgium	24–26 June	2027 GT3 Revival Series is located in Europe
4	Circuit Paul Ricard, Le Castellet, France	27–29 August	2027 GT3 Revival Series is located in Europe
5	Hungaroring, Mogyoród, Hungary	3–4 October	2027 GT3 Revival Series is located in Europe

== Entry list ==
In the series, cars homologated between 2006-2009 are classified as "Gen I" and between 2010-2013 are classified as "Gen II".

Team	Car	Engine	No.	Drivers	Class		Rounds
Team	Car	Engine	No.	Drivers	Car	Driver	Rounds

Icon	Class
Cars
G1	Gen 1
G2	Gen 2
IV	Invitational
Drivers
PA	Pro-Am Cup
Am	Am Cup

== Race results ==
Bold indicates overall winner.

Round		Circuit	Pole Position	Pro-Am Winners	Am Winners	Report
1	R1	(Spain) Barcelona				
1	R2	(Spain) Barcelona				
2	R1	(France) Dijon				
2	R2	(France) Dijon				
3	R1	(Belgium) Spa-Francorchamps				
3	R2	(Belgium) Spa-Francorchamps				
4	R1	(France) Paul Ricard				
4	R2	(France) Paul Ricard				
5	R1	(Hungary) Hungaroring				
5	R2	(Hungary) Hungaroring				

== Championship standings ==
Scoring system

Championship points are awarded for the first ten positions in each race. The pole-sitter also receives one point.

Position	**1st**	**2nd**	**3rd**	**4th**	**5th**	**6th**	**7th**	**8th**	**9th**	**10th**	**Pole**
Points	25	18	15	12	10	8	6	4	2	1	1

== See also ==
- 2027 British GT Championship
- 2027 GT World Challenge Europe
- 2027 GT World Challenge Europe Endurance Cup
- 2027 GT World Challenge Europe Sprint Cup
- 2027 Legends of Le Mans Series
- 2027 MRL GT3 Legends Series
