= 2027 24 Hours of Le Mans =

95th 24 Hours of Le Mans endurance race

Previous: 2026	Next: 2028
Index: Races | Winners

(France) 2027 24 Hours of Le Mans
Event information
- Round 5 of 9 in the 2027 FIA World Endurance Championship
- Date: 12–13 June 2027
- Location: Le Mans, France
- Venue: Circuit de la Sarthe
- Duration: 24 hours

Results

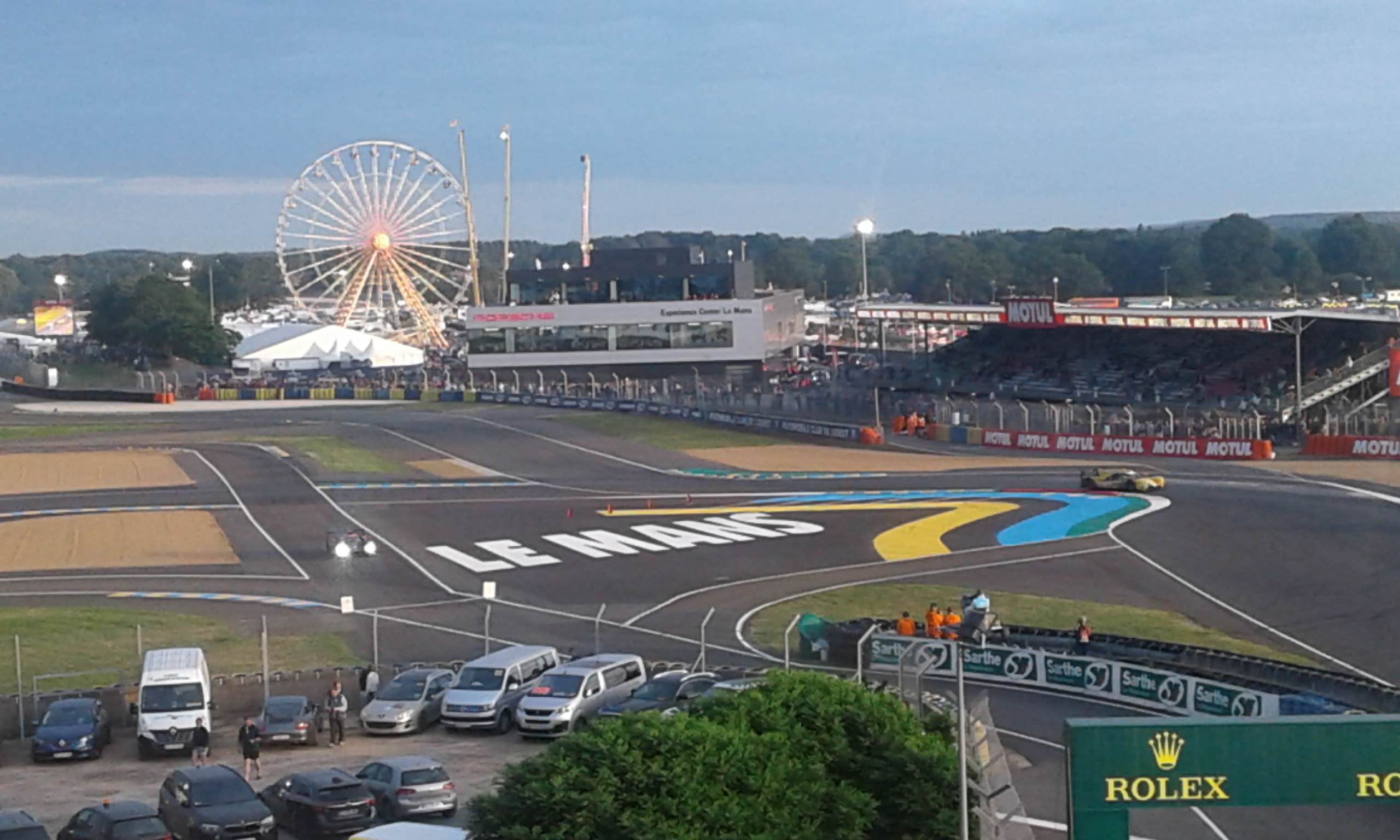
The Circuit de la Sarthe

The 95th 24 Hours of Le Mans (French: 95^{e} 24 Heures du Mans) is an automobile endurance event that is scheduled to take place on 12–13 June 2027 at the Circuit de la Sarthe in Le Mans, France. It will be the 95th running of the 24-hour race organised by the Automobile Club de l'Ouest.

== Background ==
The 2027 24 Hours of Le Mans will be the 95th running of the 24 Hours of Le Mans endurance race, held on 12–13 June 2027 at the Circuit de la Sarthe. The race will form the fifth round of the 2027 FIA World Endurance Championship season.

== Entries ==
=== Automatic entries ===
In addition to all full-season WEC entries, automatic invitations were given to all championship winners in the European Le Mans Series (ELMS), LMP2 and LMGT3 in the Asian Le Mans Series (ALMS) and Bronze Cup in GT World Challenge Europe's (GTWCE) combined Endurance and Sprint championship. Second-place finishers in LMP2 in the ELMS also earned an invite. Three IMSA teams were also granted invitations, one in Hypercar at the discretion of IMSA, and one each for the Jim Trueman and Bob Akin awards, given to the highest placed Bronze-rated drivers in IMSA's LMP2 and GT3 classes.

Automatic entries for the 2027 24 Hours of Le Mans
Reason invited	Hypercar	LMP2	LMGT3
1st in the European Le Mans Series (LMP2 and LMGT3)		(United Kingdom) United Autosports	(United Kingdom) TF Sport
2nd in the European Le Mans Series (LMP2)		(France) Forestier Racing by Panis	
1st in the European Le Mans Series (LMP2 Pro-Am)		(Portugal) Algarve Pro Racing	
1st in the European Le Mans Series (LMP3)		(Switzerland) CLX Motorsport	
IMSA SportsCar Championship at-large entries	(United States) Cadillac Whelen	(United States) George Kurtz	(Canada) Orey Fidani
1st in the Asian Le Mans Series (LMP2 and GT)			
1st in the GT World Challenge Europe (Bronze Cup)			(Switzerland) Kessel Racing
