= 2027 FIA World Endurance Championship =

Auto racing series

- Organizer: Automobile Club de l'Ouest
- Discipline: Sports car endurance racing
- Races: 9

Champions
- Hypercar Manufacturer
- LMGT3 Team

FIA World Endurance Championship
- ← 2026 2028 →

The 2027 FIA World Endurance Championship will be the fifteenth season of the FIA World Endurance Championship, a sports car racing series organised by the Fédération Internationale de l'Automobile (FIA) and the Automobile Club de l'Ouest (ACO). The series will be open to Hypercars (built under Le Mans Hypercar (LMH) or Le Mans Daytona h (LMDh) regulations) and LMGT3 racing cars.

== Calendar ==
The calendar was announced on 12 June 2026, during the 2026 24 Hours of Le Mans weekend. This Season will feature the 6 Hours of Silverstone for the first time since the 2019–20 season, and will see the return of both 8 hours of Bahrain and 1812km of Qatar, after their 1 season absence due to the ongoing conflict in Iran, making the championship a 9-round calendar for the season.

Locations of the 2027 races

Rnd	Race	Circuit	Location	Date
	Prologue	Losail International Circuit	(Qatar) Lusail	21–22 March
1	Qatar 1812 km	Losail International Circuit	(Qatar) Lusail	27 March
2	6 Hours of Imola	Imola Circuit	(Italy) Imola	11 April
3	6 Hours of Silverstone	Silverstone Circuit	(United Kingdom) Silverstone	25 April
4	6 Hours of Spa-Francorchamps	Circuit de Spa-Francorchamps	(Belgium) Stavelot	15 May
5	24 Hours of Le Mans	Circuit de la Sarthe	(France) Le Mans	12–13 June
6	6 Hours of São Paulo	Interlagos Circuit	(Brazil) São Paulo	11 July
7	Lone Star Le Mans	Circuit of the Americas	(United States) Austin, Texas	12 September
8	6 Hours of Fuji	Fuji Speedway	(Japan) Oyama, Shizuoka	26 September
9	8 Hours of Bahrain	Bahrain International Circuit	(Bahrain) Sakhir	6 November

== Entries ==
=== Hypercar ===
==== Hypercar team changes ====
- This year will see the debut of Ford and McLaren.
- Alpine is set to leave WEC after competing in the series since 2015, and the last 3 seasons in the Hypercar class after a change in motorsport strategy from Renault.

=== LMGT3 ===
- This year will see the debut of the Toyota GR GT3.

== See also ==
- 2027 IMSA SportsCar Championship
- 2027 European Le Mans Series
- 2027 Legends of Le Mans Series
- 2026–27 Asian Le Mans Series
