= SRO Motorsports Group =

International sporting organisation

- Sport: Auto racing
- Category: Sports car racing
- Jurisdiction: International
- Founded: 1995
- Affiliation: Fédération Internationale de l'Automobile
- Affiliation date: 1997
- Sub-regional affiliation: SRO Motorsports Group America
- Affiliation date: 2018
- Headquarters: London, England
- Director: Stéphane Ratel
- Operating income: ▲£8.109 million (2025)

Official website
- www.sro-motorsports.com

The SRO Motorsports Group (formerly the Stéphane Ratel Organisation, often referred to simply as SRO) is an international sporting organisation which acts as an organiser and promoter of a variety of sports car racing events and series, including the 24 Hours of Spa, the Intercontinental GT Challenge and the GT World Challenge Europe.

The company was founded in 1995 by Stéphane Ratel and is now regarded as the global leader in GT racing. Today, SRO is best known as the primary organiser of the GT World Challenge, which spans series in America, Asia, Australia and Europe, as well as other championships operating on the GT3, GT4, GT2 and TC (Touring Car) platforms. In addition to organising current racing series and events, SRO also leads activities in car rallies, track events, historic motorsport, esports, and provides balance of performance services for other notable racing series, including Super GT and the DTM.

As of 2026, SRO maintains offices in London, Paris, Brussels, Le Castellet, Austin, Hong Kong, and Canterbury, while Ratel continues to serve as the organisation's director. In addition to on-track activities, the organisation has introduced SRO Sustainability, which encompasses environmental initiatives and philanthropic investment.

== Current series ==
=== Intercontinental GT Challenge ===
Intercontinental GT Challenge was launched in 2016 to bring together major events, such as the 24 Hours of Spa and the Bathurst 12 Hour, in a unified global championship. The series is aimed at manufacturers, though rather than field their own cars they are encouraged to appoint and support local teams in selected events. Four manufacturers took part in the inaugural season, while a peak of nine entered in 2020. The 2026 season saw 6 manufacturers.

The initial seasons consisted of three events before an expansion to four in 2018 and then five in 2019. The same number was planned for 2020 before the Covid-19 pandemic resulted in the cancellation of the Suzuka 10 Hours. There will be five races in 2026: the Bathurst 12 Hour, the Nürburgring 24 Hours, the 24 Hours of Spa, the Suzuka 1000 km, Indianapolis 8 Hour.

=== GT World Challenge ===
GT World Challenge was launched in 2019 by uniting SRO's established continental series in Europe, Asia and America. Each remains a standalone category while also allowing manufacturers to score points towards a global championship. Mercedes has won three titles to date, finishing ahead of Ferrari in 2019, Audi in 2020, and Lamborghini in 2021. Australia joined the programme in 2021 after SRO agreed to take control of the Australian GT Championship.

The regional series consist of:

- GT World Challenge Europe
- GT World Challenge Asia
- GT World Challenge America
- GT World Challenge Australia

GT World Challenge Europe began life in 2011 as the Blancpain Endurance Series before developing into the Blancpain GT Series, a 10-round championship split equally between a Sprint Cup and Endurance Cup. This format remained in place for the change to GT World Challenge Europe in 2019. The championship's marquee event is the 24 Hours of Spa, which has run as part of SRO championships since 2011. GT World Challenge Asia was created in 2017 as Blancpain GT Series Asia. GT World Challenge America was for many years known as Pirelli World Challenge before being acquired by SRO in 2018. GT World Challenge Australia became the fourth series to join the global championship in 2021.

=== GT4 Series ===
Launched in 2006, the GT4 class sits below GT3 in terms of performance and is aimed at amateur drivers and aspiring professionals. The concept is owned by SRO, with each series either directly promoted by the company or organised through franchise agreements. A wide variety of cars are homologated for GT4 competition, many of which are considerably closer to their road-legal counterparts than those found in GT3. Some competitions are exclusive for GT4 cars, including the GT4 European Series, FFSA GT Championship, GT4 America Series, GT4 Australia and SRO GT Cup, while others run mixed grids of GT3 and GT4 cars, such as the British GT Championship and SRO Japan Cup.

=== Other series ===
==== GT2 European Series ====
Formerly known as the GT Sports Club, the series with an emphasis on gentleman drivers, GT2 European Series is a championship for Bronze, Titanium and Iron drivers only. The Titanium categorisation is within the Bronze category, for drivers between the age of 50 and 59. The Iron categorisation is within the Bronze category, for drivers over the age of 60. Originally the GT Sports Club are contested with GT3-spec, RACB G3, GTE-spec and Trophy cars but during the COVID-19 induced hiatus it was re-organised for the new GT2 regulations and changed the name to GT2 European Series. It supports the GT World Challenge Europe in various circuits along its calendar.

==== British GT Championship ====
Originally created by the BRDC in 1993, the British GT Championship has been overseen by SRO Motorsports Group since 2004. Races feature both GT3 and GT4 cars on-track at the same time, while Pro/Am driver line-ups are the bedrock of the series. The 2021 season is set to consist of seven domestic events and an overseas rounds at Spa-Francorchamps, as well as a revised class structure.

==== Ginetta one-make championships ====
In 2026, SRO took over the operational management of Ginetta Cars' three British-based one-make series: the Ginetta Junior Championship, Ginetta GT Academy and Ginetta GT Championship.

=== Touring Car Series ===
- TC America Series
- TC France Series

=== Other events ===
- FIA GT World Cup
- FIA Motorsport Games
- SRO E-Sport GT Series (with Kunos Simulazioni and Ak Informatica)
- Curbstone Track Events
- SpeedSeries

=== Former series ===
- BPR Global GT Series
- FIA GT Championship
- FIA GT1 World Championship
- FIA GT3 European Championship
- FIA GT Series
- Formula Renault 2.0 UK Championship
- Renault Clio Cup UK Series
- Blancpain Revival Series (GT90's Revival Series)
- Dutch GT4 Championship (It merged with GT4 European Series in 2014)
- British Formula Three Championship
- Supercar Rally (features V6, V8 or V10 coupé)
- Venturi Gentleman Drivers Trophy
- Lamborghini Supertrophy
- GT4 Scandinavia
