= 2016 24 Hours of Spa =

2016 Total Spa 24 Hours

Seasons
- ← 2015 2017 →

Layout of the Circuit de Spa-Francorchamps

The 2016 Total Spa 24 Hours was the 69th running of the Spa 24 Hours. It was also the fourth round of the 2016 Blancpain GT Series Endurance Cup and was held on 30 and 31 July at the Circuit de Spa-Francorchamps, Belgium.

The race was won by ROWE Racing and drivers Philipp Eng, Maxime Martin and Alexander Sims. The trio's No. 99 BMW M6 GT3 finished just shy of two minutes clear of AKKA ASP and their No. 88 Mercedes-AMG GT3, driven by Felix Rosenqvist, Tristan Vautier and Renger van der Zande. Completing the podium in third place was the No. 28 Belgian Audi Club Team WRT Audi R8 LMS of Nico Müller, René Rast and Laurens Vanthoor, five seconds behind second place.

== Race result ==
Pos	Class	No	Team	Drivers	Car	Laps
1	Pro Cup	99	(Germany) ROWE Racing	(Austria) Philipp Eng (Belgium) Maxime Martin (United Kingdom) Alexander Sims	BMW M6 GT3	531
2	Pro Cup	88	(France) AKKA ASP	(Sweden) Felix Rosenqvist (France) Tristan Vautier (Netherlands) Renger van der Zande	Mercedes-AMG GT3	531
3	Pro Cup	28	(Belgium) Belgian Audi Club Team WRT	(Switzerland) Nico Müller (Germany) René Rast (Belgium) Laurens Vanthoor	Audi R8 LMS	531
4	Pro Cup	8	(United Kingdom) Bentley Team M-Sport	(Belgium) Wolfgang Reip (Spain) Andy Soucek (Belgium) Maxime Soulet	Bentley Continental GT3	530
5	Pro Cup	86	(Germany) HTP Motorsport	(Germany) Maximilian Götz (Germany) Thomas Jäger (United Kingdom) Gary Paffett	Mercedes-AMG GT3	530
6	Pro Cup	84	(Germany) HTP Motorsport	(Austria) Dominik Baumann (Germany) Maximilian Buhk (Malaysia) Jazeman Jaafar	Mercedes-AMG GT3	529
7	Pro Cup	26	(France) Saintéloc Racing	(France) Grégory Guilvert (Germany) Christopher Haase (France) Mike Parisy	Audi R8 LMS	527
8	Pro Cup	4	(Belgium) Belgian Audi Club Team WRT	(Belgium) Bertrand Baguette (Belgium) Adrien de Leener (Germany) Pierre Kaffer	Audi R8 LMS	527
9	Pro Cup	75	(Czech Republic) ISR	(Italy) Edoardo Mortara (Czech Republic) Filip Salaquarda (Philippines) Marlon Stöckinger	Audi R8 LMS	527
10	Pro-Am Cup	76	(France) IMSA Performance	(France) Thierry Cornac (France) Maxime Jousse (France) Raymond Narac (France) Patrick Pilet	Porsche 911 GT3 R	527
11	Pro Cup	16	(Austria) GRT Grasser Racing Team	(Netherlands) Jeroen Bleekemolen (Italy) Mirko Bortolotti (Switzerland) Rolf Ineichen	Lamborghini Huracán GT3	527
12	Pro Cup	3	(Belgium) Belgian Audi Club Team WRT	(Portugal) Filipe Albuquerque (Brazil) Rodrigo Baptista (Brazil) Sérgio Jimenez	Audi R8 LMS	526
13	Pro-Am Cup	74	(Czech Republic) ISR	(Switzerland) Philippe Giauque (France) Henry Hassid (France) Nicolas Lapierre (France) Franck Perera	Audi R8 LMS	526
14	Pro Cup	101	(Germany) Attempto Racing	(Italy) Fabio Babini (Switzerland) Patric Niederhauser (Italy) Daniel Zampieri	Lamborghini Huracán GT3	526
15	Pro Cup	19	(Austria) GRT Grasser Racing Team	(Italy) Michele Beretta (Italy) Andrea Piccini (Germany) Luca Stolz	Lamborghini Huracán GT3	525
16	Pro Cup	50	(Italy) AF Corse	(Thailand) Pasin Lathouras (Italy) Alessandro Pier Guidi (Italy) Michele Rugolo	Ferrari 488 GT3	524
17	Pro-Am Cup	666	(United Kingdom) Barwell Motorsport	(United Kingdom) Oliver Gavin (United Kingdom) Phil Keen (United Kingdom) Jon Minshaw (United Kingdom) Joe Osborne	Lamborghini Huracán GT3	524
18	Pro Cup	7	(United Kingdom) Bentley Team M-Sport	(France) Vincent Abril (United Kingdom) Steven Kane (United Kingdom) Guy Smith	Bentley Continental GT3	524
19	Pro-Am Cup	89	(France) AKKA ASP	(France) Laurent Cazenave (United Kingdom) Michael Lyons (France) Morgan Moullin-Traffort (Switzerland) Daniele Perfetti	Mercedes-AMG GT3	523
20	Pro Cup	00	(Germany) AMG - Team Black Falcon	(Netherlands) Yelmer Buurman (Germany) Maro Engel (Germany) Bernd Schneider	Mercedes-AMG GT3	523
21	Pro Cup	85	(Germany) HTP Motorsport	(United Kingdom) Luciano Bacheta (Netherlands) Indy Dontje (Austria) Clemens Schmid	Mercedes-AMG GT3	522
22	Pro-Am Cup	11	(Switzerland) Kessel Racing	(Italy) Alessandro Bonacini (Poland) Michał Broniszewski (Italy) Andrea Rizzoli (Italy) Giacomo Piccini	Ferrari 488 GT3	521
23	Pro-Am Cup	34	(Czech Republic) Scuderia Praha	(Italy) David Fumanelli (Czech Republic) Josef Král (Italy) Matteo Malucelli (Czech Republic) Jiří Písařík	Ferrari 488 GT3	519
24	Pro-Am Cup	44	(United Kingdom) Oman Racing Team	(United Kingdom) Jonathan Adam (Oman) Ahmad Al Harthy (United Kingdom) Devon Modell (United Kingdom) Darren Turner	Aston Martin V12 Vantage GT3	518
25	Pro-Am Cup	78	(United Kingdom) Barwell Motorsport	(United Kingdom) Marco Attard (United Kingdom) Tom Kimber-Smith (Russia) Leo Machitski (Italy) Marco Mapelli	Lamborghini Huracán GT3	517
26	Pro-Am Cup	56	(Germany) AMG - Team Black Falcon	(Spain) Daniel Juncadella (Germany) Oliver Morley (Spain) Miguel Toril (Saudi Arabia) Abdulaziz Bin Turki Al Faisal	Mercedes-AMG GT3	516
27	Pro Cup	90	(Italy) AF Corse	(Italy) Alessandro Balzan (Italy) Raffaele Giammaria (Argentina) Ezequiel Pérez Companc	Ferrari 458 Italia GT3	515
28	Pro-Am Cup	38	(Italy) Antonelli Motorsport	(Italy) Michela Cerruti (Monaco) Cédric Sbirrazzuoli (Italy) Loris Spinelli (France) Gilles Vannelet	Lamborghini Huracán GT3	514
29	Pro Cup	1	(Belgium) Belgian Audi Club Team WRT	(United Kingdom) Will Stevens (Belgium) Dries Vanthoor (Belgium) Frédéric Vervisch	Audi R8 LMS	514
30	Pro-Am Cup	29	(Austria) Konrad Motorsport	(Netherlands) Rik Breukers (France) Jules Gounon (Austria) Luca Rettenbacher (Austria) Christopher Zöchling	Lamborghini Huracán GT3	513
31	Pro Cup	58	(United Kingdom) Garage 59	(United Kingdom) Rob Bell (France) Côme Ledogar (New Zealand) Shane van Gisbergen	McLaren 650S GT3	513
32	Am Cup	888	(Switzerland) Kessel Racing	(Italy) Nicola Cadei (Russia) Vadim Gitlin (Australia) Liam Talbot (Italy) Marco Zanuttini	Ferrari 458 Italia GT3	513
33	Pro Cup	57	(Germany) AMG - Team Black Falcon	(United Kingdom) Adam Christodoulou (Germany) Hubert Haupt (Sweden) Andreas Simonsen	Mercedes-AMG GT3	512
34	Am Cup	51	(Italy) Spirit of Race	(Italy) Matteo Cressoni (Portugal) Francisco Guedes (United States) Peter Mann (Italy) Rino Mastronardi	Ferrari 488 GT3	512
35	Pro-Am Cup	132	(Australia) Lago Racing	(Australia) Roger Lago (Australia) Steve Owen (Australia) David Russell (Australia) Jonathon Webb	Lamborghini Gallardo R-EX	509
36	Am Cup	333	(Germany) Rinaldi Racing	(Germany) Pierre Ehret (Germany) Alexander Mattschull (Russia) Rinat Salikhov (Germany) Marco Seefried	Ferrari 488 GT3	506
37	Pro-Am Cup	22	(United Kingdom) Nissan GT Academy Team RJN	(Mexico) Ricardo Sánchez (France) Romain Sarazin (Australia) Matthew Simmons (United Kingdom) Sean Walkinshaw	Nissan GT-R Nismo GT3	506
38	Pro-Am Cup	40	(Italy) Easy Race	(Italy) Ferdinando Geri (Italy) Daniel Mancinelli (United States) Gregory Romanelli (Italy) Niccolò Schirò	Ferrari 488 GT3	505
39	Am Cup	69	(Slovakia) ARC Bratislava	(Slovakia) Miroslav Konopka (Poland) Andrzej Lewandowski (Slovakia) Zdeno Mikuláško (Poland) Teodor Myszkowski	Lamborghini Huracán GT3	502
40	Pro Cup	60	(United Kingdom) Garage 59	(Brazil) Pipo Derani (Brazil) Bruno Senna (United Kingdom) Duncan Tappy	McLaren 650S GT3	500
41	Pro Cup	98	(Germany) ROWE Racing	(Netherlands) Nick Catsburg (Netherlands) Stef Dusseldorp (Germany) Dirk Werner	BMW M6 GT3	497
42	Pro-Am Cup	63	(Austria) GRT Grasser Racing Team	(Italy) Diego Alessi (Denmark) Dennis Andersen (Denmark) Anders Fjordbach (Germany) Nicolas Pohler	Lamborghini Huracán GT3	488
43	Pro-Am Cup	25	(France) Saintéloc Racing	(Italy) Marco Bonanomi (Belgium) Frédéric Bouvy (Belgium) Christian Kelders (France) Marc Rostan	Audi R8 LMS	484
44	Pro Cup	23	(United Kingdom) Nissan GT Academy Team RJN	(United Kingdom) Alex Buncombe (Spain) Lucas Ordóñez (Japan) Mitsunori Takaboshi	Nissan GT-R Nismo GT3	481
45	Pro-Am Cup	10	(Italy) Ombra Racing	(Italy) Matteo Beretta (Italy) Giovanni Berton (Italy) Stefano Costantini (Italy) Stefano Gattuso	Lamborghini Huracán GT3	480
46	Pro-Am Cup	52	(Italy) AF Corse	(United Kingdom) Duncan Cameron (Republic of Ireland) Matt Griffin (Italy) Riccardo Ragazzi (United Kingdom) Andrew Scott	Ferrari 488 GT3	471
47	National Cup	911	(Switzerland) RMS	(France) Jean-Marc Bachelier (United States) Howard Blank (France) Yannick Mallegol (Monaco) Fabrice Notari	Porsche 991 GT3 Cup	470
48	National Cup	230	(Belgium) SpeedLover	(Belgium) Wim Meulders (Belgium) Grégory Paisse (Belgium) Pierre-Yves Paque (France) Philippe Richard	Porsche 991 GT3 Cup	468
49	Pro Cup	114	(Switzerland) Emil Frey Racing	(Switzerland) Jonathan Hirschi (Austria) Christian Klien (Finland) Markus Palttala	Jaguar XK Emil Frey G3	446
50	Pro Cup	6	(Germany) Audi Sport Team Phoenix	(Germany) Christopher Mies (Germany) Frank Stippler (Germany) Markus Winkelhock	Audi R8 LMS	425
51	Am Cup	27	(France) Saintéloc Racing	(France) Michael Blanchemain (France) Jean-Paul Buffin (France) Valentin Hasse-Clot (France) Gilles Lallemant	Audi R8 LMS ultra	424
52	Pro-Am Cup	100	(Germany) Attempto Racing	(Belgium) Louis Machiels (Netherlands) Jeroen Mul (Netherlands) Max van Splunteren (Italy) Giovanni Venturini	Lamborghini Huracán GT3	415
53	Pro Cup	14	(Switzerland) Emil Frey Racing	(Spain) Albert Costa (Switzerland) Lorenz Frey (Monaco) Stéphane Ortelli	Jaguar XK Emil Frey G3	408
54	Am Cup	30	(United Kingdom) Team Parker Racing	(United Kingdom) Chris Harris (South Africa) David Perel (United Kingdom) Derek Pierce (Sweden) Carl Rosenblad	Bentley Continental GT3	376
NC	Pro-Am Cup	55	(Austria) AT Racing	(Italy) Francesco Castellacci (Italy) Marco Cioci (Switzerland) Thomas Flohr (Italy) Piergiuseppe Perazzini	Ferrari 488 GT3	333
NC	Pro Cup	2	(Belgium) Belgian Audi Club Team WRT	(Netherlands) Robin Frijns (United Kingdom) Stuart Leonard (United Kingdom) Michael Meadows	Audi R8 LMS	302
NC	Pro-Am Cup	12	(Belgium) Boutsen Ginion	(France) Julien Darras (Luxembourg) Olivier Grotz (Saudi Arabia) Karim Ojjeh (France) Arno Santamato	BMW M6 GT3	257
NC	Am Cup	49	(Italy) Kaspersky Motorsport	(Portugal) Rui Águas (Belgium) Stéphane Lémeret (Russia) Alexander Moiseev (Italy) Davide Rizzo	Ferrari 458 Italia GT3	254
NC	Am Cup	41	(France) Classic and Modern Racing	(France) Romain Brandela (France) Timothé Buret (Belgium) Bernard Delhez (France) Mickaël Petit	Ferrari 458 Italia GT3	244
NC	Am Cup	42	(France) Classic and Modern Racing	(France) Sylvain Debs (France) David Loger (France) Eric Mouez (France) Thomas Nicolle	Ferrari 458 Italia GT3	223
NC	Pro Cup	59	(United Kingdom) Garage 59	(Switzerland) Alex Fontana (United Kingdom) Struan Moore (United Kingdom) Andrew Watson	McLaren 650S GT3	208
NC	Pro-Am Cup	24	(United Kingdom) Team Parker Racing	(United Kingdom) Ian Loggie (United Kingdom) Callum MacLeod (United Kingdom) Andy Meyrick (United Kingdom) Tom Onslow-Cole	Bentley Continental GT3	168
NC	Pro-Am Cup	15	(Italy) BMW Team Italia	(Italy) Stefano Colombo (Netherlands) Max Koebolt (Italy) Giorgio Roda (Germany) Martin Tomczyk	BMW M6 GT3	96
NC	Pro-Am Cup	77	(Germany) Attempto Racing	(France) Nicolas Armindo (France) Kévin Estre (Germany) Jürgen Häring (France) Clément Mateu	Porsche 911 GT3 R	33
NC	Pro-Am Cup	53	(Italy) AF Corse	(Monaco) Olivier Beretta (Italy) Lorenzo Bontempelli (Italy) Giancarlo Fisichella (Japan) Motoaki Ishikawa	Ferrari 488 GT3	33
