= Rowe Mineralölwerk =

German oil company

- Company type: GmbH
- Industry: Oil
- Founder: Michael Zehe
- Headquarters: Worms, Germany
- Key people: Michael Zehe, Alexandra Kohlmann (managing director)
- Products: Motor oil; Synthetic lubricants
- Number of employees: 300
- Website: www.rowe-oil.com

Rowe Mineralölwerk GmbH is a lubricant manufacturer headquartered in Worms, Germany. Founded by Michael Zehe in Flörsheim-Dalsheim in 1995, the company relocated its headquarters to Bubenheim in the Palatinate in 2000. To increase production capacity, the new headquarters in Worms were opened on 9 December 2013.

== Products ==
Rowe's product range includes motor oils, gear and hydraulic oils, industrial and metalworking lubricants, bio-lubricants, fuel additives, but also radiator and windshield antifreeze and various car care products. The company's other products include lubricants for two-wheelers, commercial vehicles, boats and combined heat and power plants. With its own grease plant, Rowe has been producing multi-purpose and high-performance greases for the extended lubricants market since 2015. Since 2017, all Rowe products have been fully CO_{2} compensated.

== Markets ==
Rowe lubricants are represented in over 80 countries worldwide. Southern and Eastern Europe, the Middle East, Asia and North and South America are among the main export markets.

== Production ==
Lubricants are produced in 38 mixing tanks and 12 filling plants on an area of more than 110,000 m^{2} in Worms. The second plant, based in Bubenheim, has a further ten filling plants specializing in radiator antifreeze, brake fluids and industrial lubricants.

== Sponsorships ==
Rowe is involved in sponsoring the following below:

- Culture: Symphonic Accordion Orchestra Hessen (SAkkOH)
- Squash: Black & White Racket Club e.V. Worms and various others.
- Powerboat: Since 2016, Rowe has supported the ROWE PowerBoat team, which competes in the Formula 2 World and European Championships.
- Motorsport: Rowe has been the main sponsor of the Nürburgring Endurance Series at the Nürburgring since 2009 and expanded its commitment by being present on the start number mats of all vehicles starting in 2017. Rowe also became the official lubricant partner of the Britcar Endurance Championship, and title partner of the Britcar Trophy Championship.
- Football:
  - Borussia Dortmund
  - Atlético Madrid
  - Wormatia Worms

== Rowe Racing ==
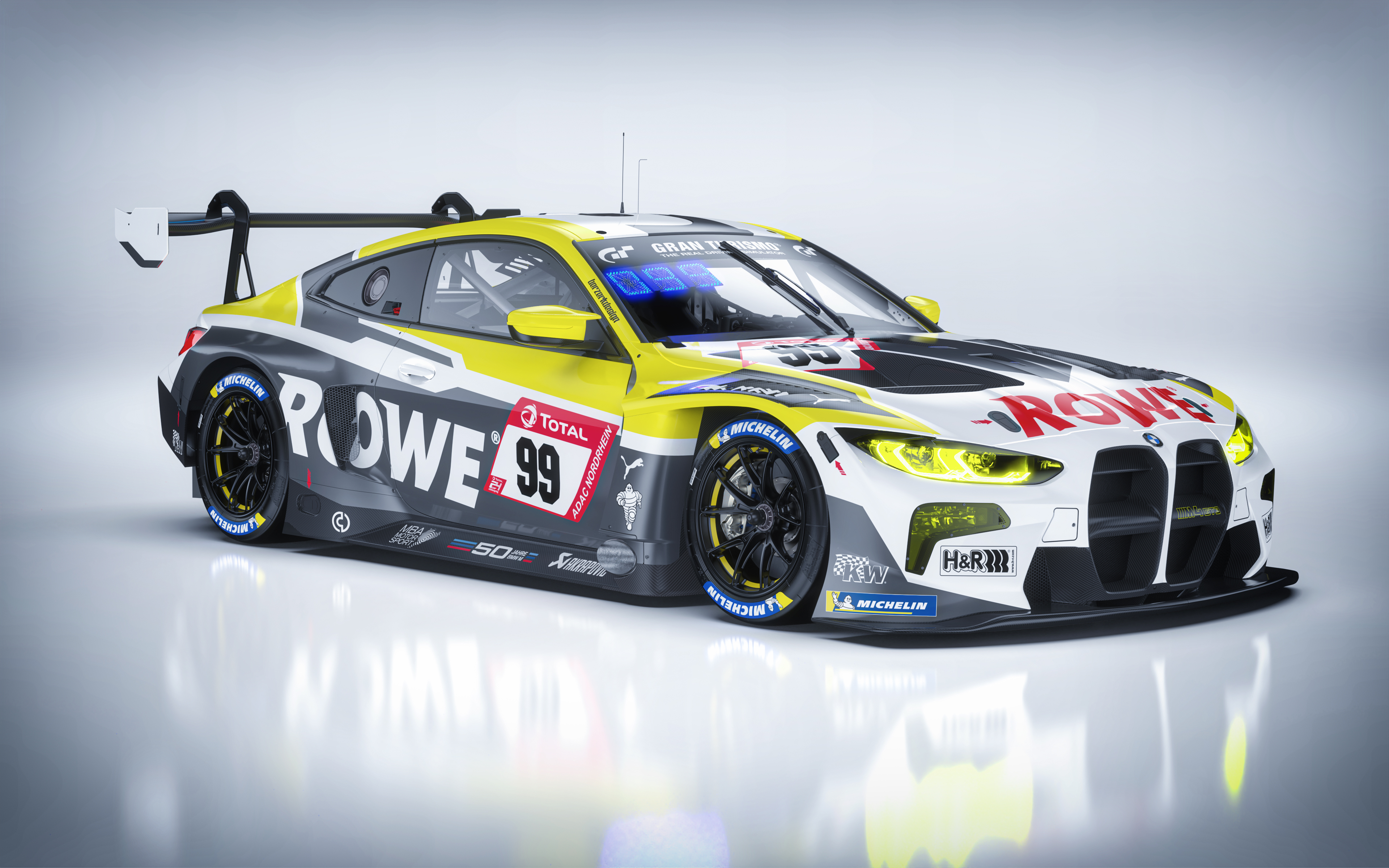
BMW M4 GT3 in its Rowe Racing livery

In cooperation with Motorsport Competence Group AG (MCG AG), the Rowe Racing team has existed since 2011 and is mainly active in endurance races. Rowe primarily uses the cooperation to further develop and test its own products under racing conditions, but also to strengthen and publicize the Rowe brand.

== Certifications and licenses ==
Rowe's certifications are ISO 9001 (2015), IATF 16949 (2016), ISO 14001 (2015), ISO 50001 (2011)
