= Philipp Eng =

Austrian racing driver (born 1990)

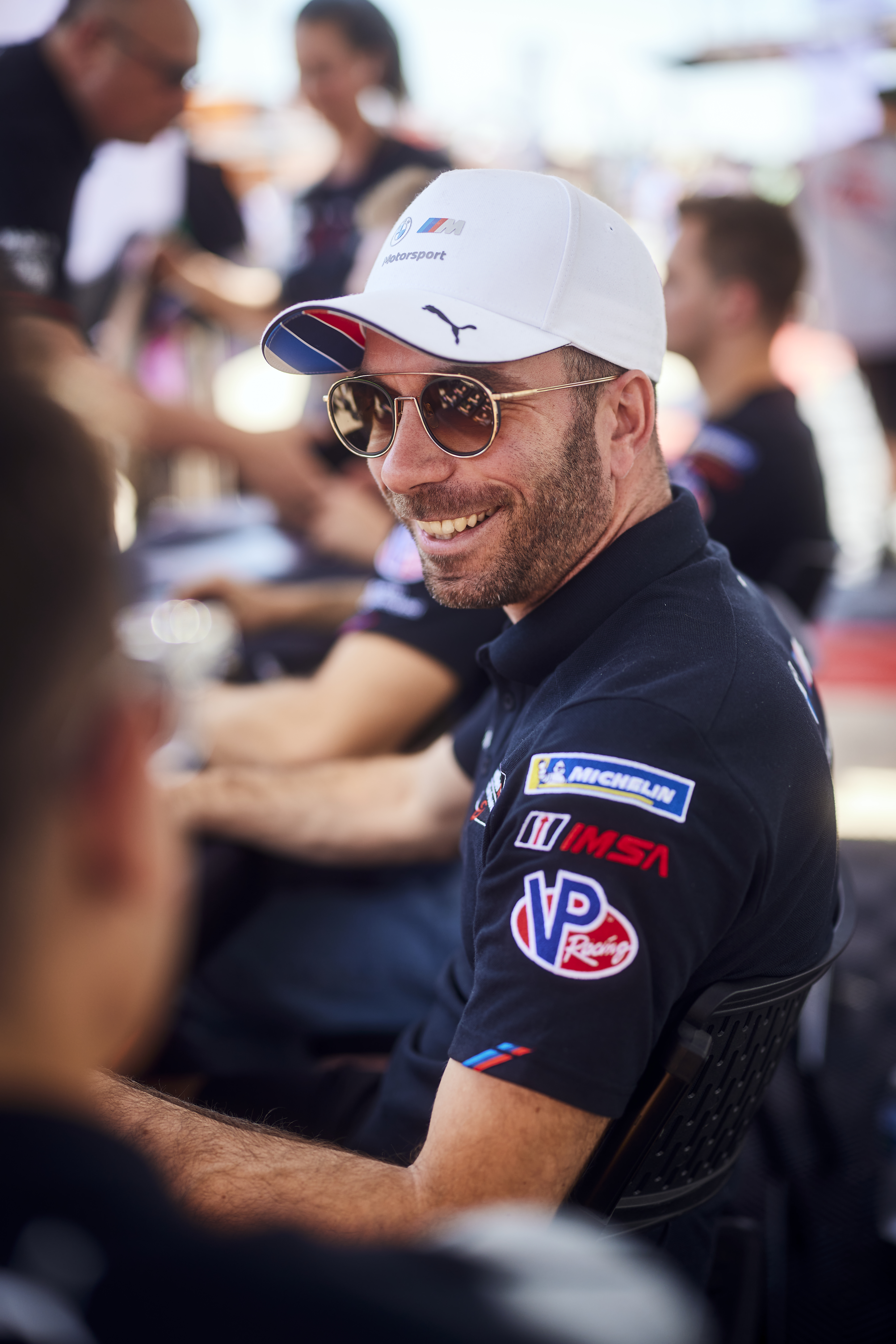
- Eng in 2025.
- Nationality: Austrian
- Born: 28 February 1990 (age 36) Salzburg, Austria

IMSA career
- Debut season: 2023
- Current team: BMW Team RLL
- Categorisation: FIA Silver (until 2014); FIA Gold (2015–2018); FIA Platinum (2019–)
- Car number: 24
- Starts: 49
- Wins: 3
- Podiums: 10
- Poles: 4
- Best finish: 4th in 2025

Previous series
- 2021-23 2012-15 2011-15 2011-12 2009-10 2008 2008 2006–07 2006: Pure ETCR; Porsche Supercup; Porsche Carrera Cup Germany; ADAC GT Masters; FIA Formula Two; German F3; Formula BMW Europe; Formula BMW ADAC; Formula BMW UK

Championship titles
- 2015 2014-2015: Porsche Supercup; Porsche Carrera Cup Germany

Philipp Eng (born 28 February 1990 in Salzburg) is an Austrian professional racing driver, and BMW Motorsport works driver. He will Leave BMW Motorsport at the end of the 2026 season

== Life ==
Eng initially grew up in Salzburg before frequent relocations became necessary due to his involvement in motorsport. At the age of 13, he moved to Italy, where, following victory in the 2004 Italian Open Masters karting championship, he was accepted into the Red Bull Junior Team. With Red Bull, Eng gained his first sponsor, providing the support that enabled him to establish himself in motorsport. In 2009, he relocated to Mannheim, before moving his main residence to Stuttgart in 2011. In the same year, Eng qualified for the FIA Young Driver Academy, where junior drivers were trained not only in terms of driving ability but also in areas such as technical knowledge and media relations. Before Eng was able to make a sufficient living from motorsport alone, he also worked for a period as an instructor and driver coach.

Since 2021, Eng has appeared regularly on ServusTV, serving as an expert commentator on motorsport events such as Formula One, Formula E and DTM broadcasts.

Eng lives in Austria, is married and has a son. In addition to his television work in motorsport, he is also active as a road cyclist.

== Career ==
=== Karting ===
Eng started karting in 1998, by competing in Intercontinental A Junior karts, competing in the Andrea Margutti Trophy and the Italian Open Masters. Eng finished 18th in the Margutti Trophy, leading home Marco Wittmann, while he finished 30th in the Italian Open Masters. Eng continued at JICA level in 2004, finishing seventh in the Margutti Trophy, and 31st in the European Championship. One highlight however was that Eng won the Italian Open Masters, holding off Wittmann again by five points. He moved to ICA level in 2005, but only contested the Italian Championship and the Open Masters. Eng finished in the top ten of both series, ranking ninth in the Open Masters and tenth in the Italian Championship.

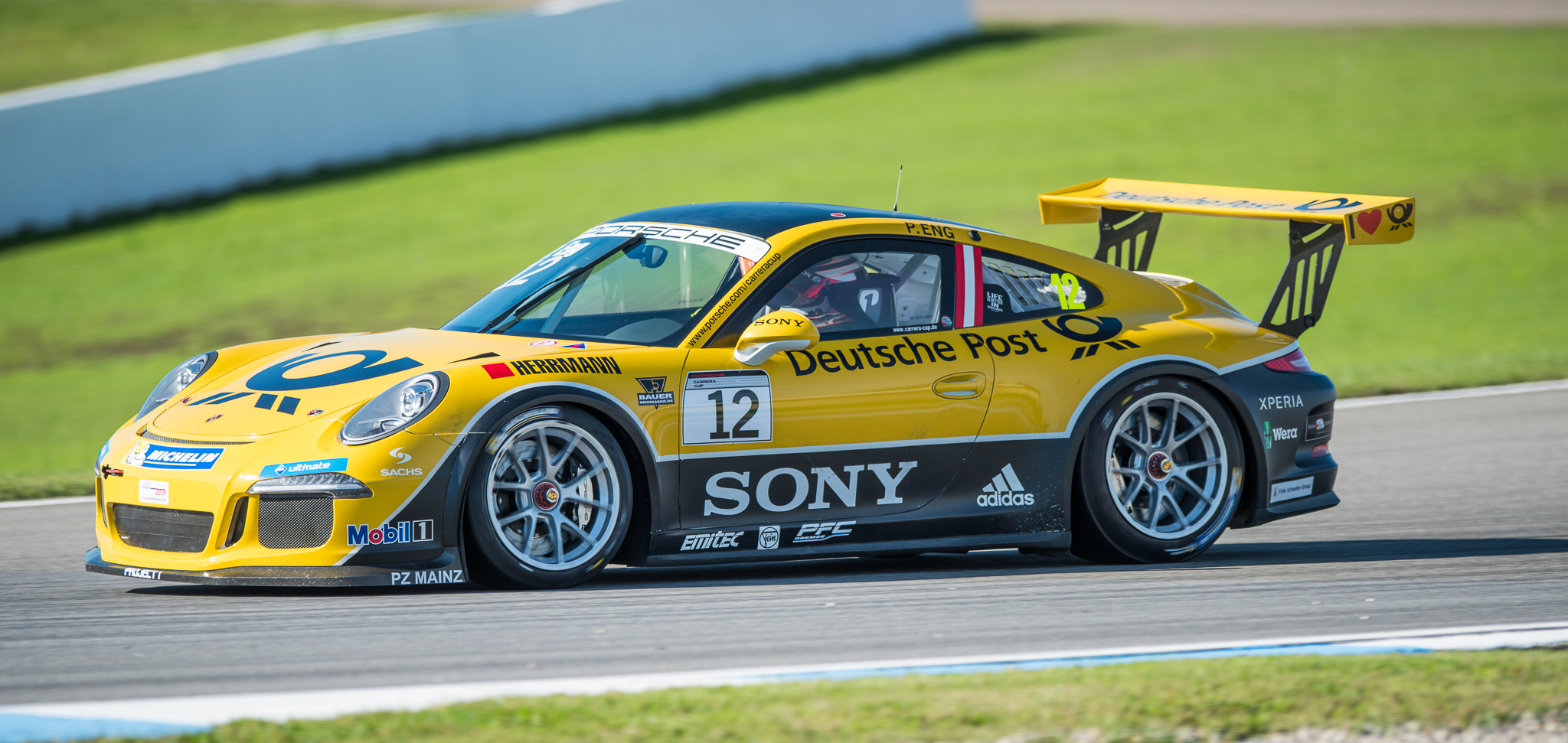
Eng competing at the Hockenheimring during the finale of the 2014 Porsche Carrera Cup Germany season in which he won the championship.

=== Formula BMW ===
Eng made his car racing debut for ADAC Berlin-Brandenburg in the Formula BMW ADAC series in 2006. Eng finished tenth in the championship and runner-up behind Jens Klingmann in the Rookie Cup, with a podium coming at the third round at Lausitz. He also competed in a solitary round of the British series for Carlin Motorsport at Silverstone. He finished fourteenth in the second race, having retired from the first. Eng continued in the ADAC series in 2007, and would go on to finish third in the championship behind the Eifelland Racing cars of Klingmann and Daniel Campos-Hull who took twelve of the eighteen race wins between them. Eng did take one win at Barcelona but only after Klingmann was given a ten-second penalty for dangerous driving.

Eng did make up for this in some aspects by winning the end of season World Final from pole position. Having switched to Mücke Motorsport, Eng dominated the race before leading home Wittmann, Klingmann and Sebastián Saavedra. This earned him a test for the BMW Sauber Formula One team, which he undertook in 2008. Eng completed his FBMW career by driving for Mücke in the inaugural season of the Formula BMW Europe championship. As he was a guest driver, he was ineligible to score points. His best finish came at Spa, when he finished fourth in a wet race.

=== Formula Three ===
Eng competed in four rounds of the 2008 German Formula Three season with HS Technik at the season-opening round at Hockenheim, and also with Ombra Racing at the season-closing round at Oschersleben. Eng finished eleventh in the championship, including a third-place finish at Oschersleben, and a pole and fastest lap coming at Hockenheim.

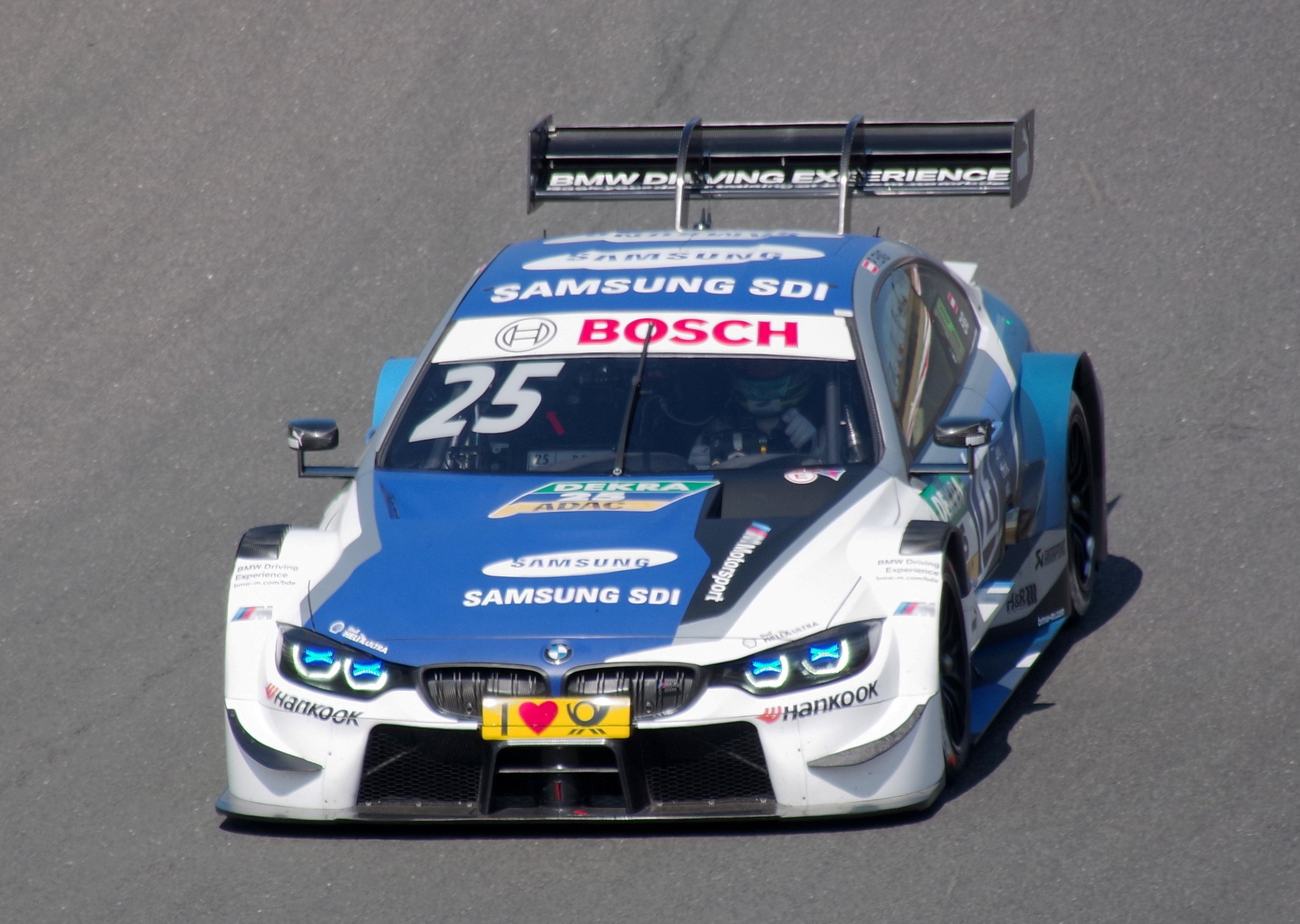
Eng driving at Brands Hatch during the 2018 Deutsche Tourenwagen Masters season.

=== FIA Formula Two ===
2009 saw Eng move up to the FIA Formula Two Championship, driving car number 33. He finished eighth in the championship, including a win from pole position at Brands Hatch, taking the first win by an Austrian driver since Jo Gartner did so at Pau in 1983.

Eng had a tests in GP2 Series for Ocean Racing Technology, but remained in Formula Two for 2010. On the second race of the opening round at Silverstone Circuit, he started from pole and took his second win. He scored a further two wins, improving his championship position to sixth.

=== GT Racing ===
In 2011, Eng switched to GT racing, joining Callaway Competition alongside Toni Seiler in the ADAC GT Masters. The pair concluded the season 39th in the drivers’ standings. In 2012, Eng contested only six of the sixteen championship races with Fredy Barth for MRS GT-Racing, but nevertheless managed to score points in one race.

In the following years, 2012 and 2013, Eng competed in the Porsche Carrera Cup for MRS GT-Racing. In 2014 and 2015, he raced for Deutsche Post by Project 1, securing the championship title in both seasons. In 2015, Eng also triumphed in the international Porsche Mobil 1 Supercup. He became the first driver to successfully defend his title in the Porsche Carrera Cup Germany. For Rowe Racing, Eng drove a BMW M6 GT3 in the 2016 24 Hours of Nürburgring, finishing in fifth place. In the same year, he claimed victory in the 24 Hours of Spa-Francorchamps alongside Alexander Sims and Maxime Martin in the Rowe BMW. In total, Eng has won this 24-hour race three times. After his 2016 success, he added a second victory in 2018 with Tom Blomqvist and Christian Krognes in the Walkenhorst BMW M6 GT3 carrying the number 34, before taking his third win in 2023, partnering Marco Wittmann and Nick Yelloly again in a Rowe BMW. Eng is regarded as the youngest three-time winner in the history of the event.

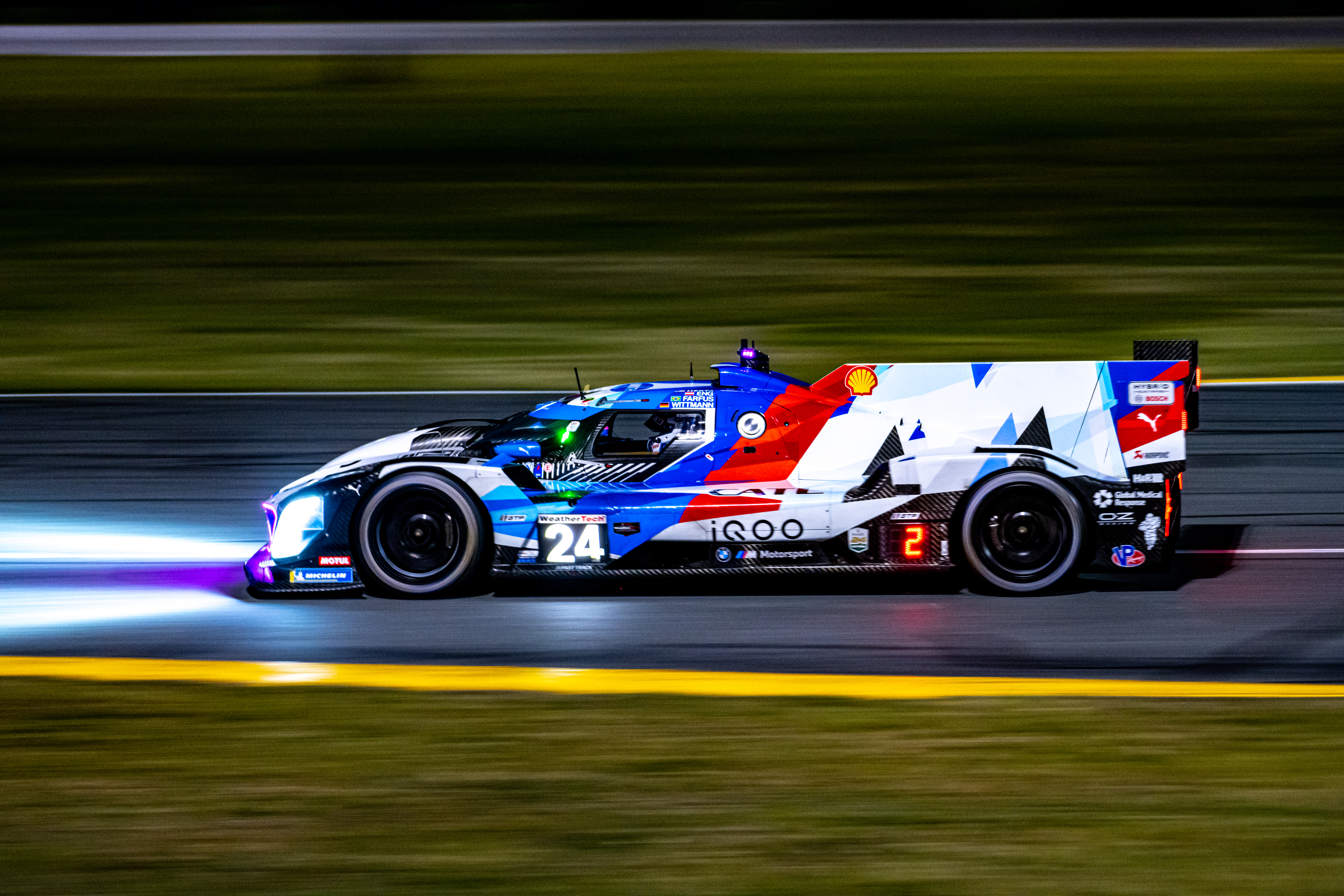
Eng driving at the 2023 24 Hours of Daytona.

=== Deutsche Tourenwagen Masters ===
From 2018 to 2020, Eng competed in the Class 1 DTM for BMW. He claimed his first podium in the third round of the 2018 season at the Lausitzring. In 2019, he secured his maiden DTM victory in the fourth race at Zolder in Belgium. In addition, he collected two further podium finishes that year. Eng concluded the 2019 season sixth in the overall standings. In 2022, he returned to the DTM with Schubert Motorsport.

=== IMSA WeatherTech SportsCar Championship ===
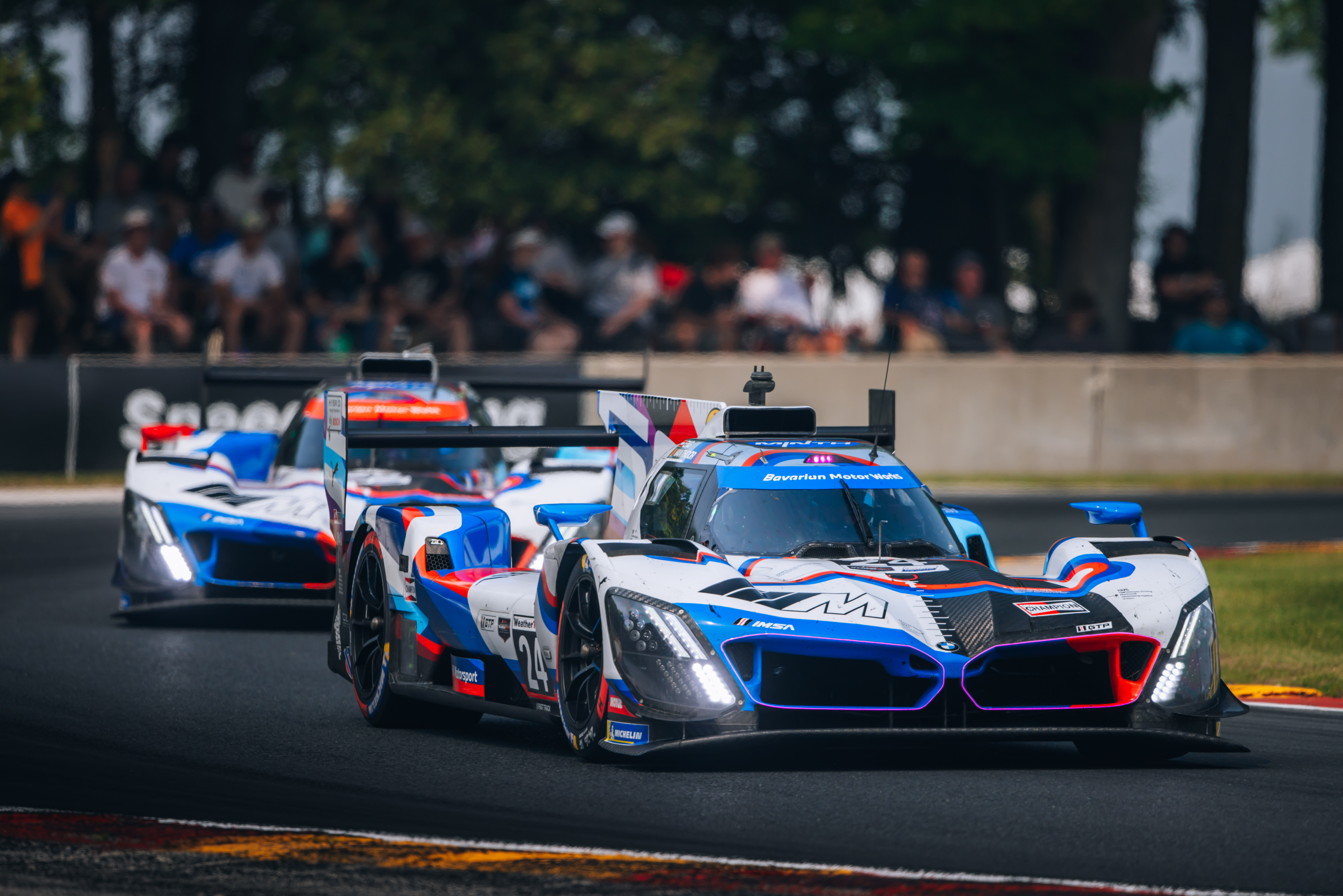
IMSA Road America 2025

Since 2023, Eng has been competing in the IMSA WeatherTech SportsCar Championship. In 2024, together with his team-mate Jesse Krohn, he claimed victory in the eighth of nine season races in the GTP class of the North American IMSA series. With this achievement, he became the first Austrian driver to win a top-category race at the Indianapolis Motor Speedway. In 2025, Eng and his team-mate Dries Vanthoor secured BMW's first win of the season in the M Hybrid V8 at the IMSA WeatherTech SportsCar Championship round at Road America.

== Racing record ==
=== Career summary ===
Season	Series	Team	Races	Wins	Poles	F/Laps	Podiums	Points	Position
2006	Formula BMW ADAC	ADAC Berlin-Brandenburg	18	0	0	0	1	73	10th
2006	Formula BMW UK	Carlin Motorsport	2	0	0	0	0	0	26th
2007	Formula BMW ADAC	ADAC Berlin-Brandenburg	18	1	2	3	9	595	**3rd**
2007	Formula BMW World Final	Mücke Motorsport	1	1	1	0	1	N/A	**1st**
2008	German Formula 3 Championship	HS Technik Motorsport	2	0	1	1	0	18	11th
2008	German Formula 3 Championship	Ombra Racing	2	0	0	0	1	18	11th
2008	Formula BMW Europe	Mücke Motorsport	6	0	0	0	0	0	NC†
2009	FIA Formula Two Championship	MotorSport Vision	16	1	1	0	3	39	8th
2010	FIA Formula Two Championship	MotorSport Vision	18	3	2	1	4	142	6th
2011	ADAC GT Masters	Callaway Competition	14	0	0	1	0	6	39th
2011	Porsche Carrera Cup Germany	MRS Team PZ Aschaffenburg	1	0	0	0	0	0	NC
2012	Porsche Carrera Cup Germany	MRS GT-Racing	16	0	1	0	1	112.5	10th
2012	ADAC GT Masters	MRS GT-Racing	7	0	1	0	0	1	43rd
2012	Porsche Supercup	MRS GT-Racing	5	0	0	0	0	41	13th
2013	Porsche Carrera Cup Germany	Logiplus MRS-Racing	17	0	0	1	4	166	5th
2013	Blancpain Endurance Series - Pro-Am	MRS GT-Racing	3	0	0	0	0	0	NC
2013	Blancpain Endurance Series - Am	MRS GT-Racing	1	0	0	0	0	6	37th
2013	Porsche Supercup	MRS GT-Racing	1	0	0	0	0	N/A	NC†
2014	Porsche Carrera Cup Germany	Team Deutsche Post by Project 1	18	2	1	1	7	233	**1st**
2014	Porsche Supercup	Team Project 1	10	0	2	0	3	98	5th
2015	Porsche Carrera Cup Germany	Deutsche Post by Project 1	17	9	10	4	14	268	**1st**
2015	Porsche Supercup	Market Leader Team by Project 1	10	2	2	0	5	145	**1st**
2015	ADAC GT Masters	Schütz Motorsport	10	0	1	0	1	28	26th
2015	24 Hours of Nürburgring - SP7	Black Falcon Team TMD Friction	1	1	0	0	1	N/A	**1st**
2016	Blancpain GT Series Sprint Cup	Rowe Racing	10	0	0	0	2	23	11th
2016	Blancpain GT Series Endurance Cup	Rowe Racing	5	1	0	0	1	56	4th
2016	24 Hours of Nürburgring - SP9	Rowe Racing	1	0	0	0	0	N/A	5th
2016	24 Hours of Le Mans - LMGTE Pro	Dempsey-Proton Racing	1	0	0	0	0	N/A	8th
2017	ADAC GT Masters	BMW Team Schnitzer	14	1	3	2	4	116	4th
2017	Blancpain GT Series Sprint Cup	Rowe Racing	8	0	0	0	0	10	18th
2017	Blancpain GT Series Endurance Cup	Rowe Racing	4	0	0	0	0	6	27th
2017	Intercontinental GT Challenge	Rowe Racing	1	0	0	0	0	0	NC
2017	24 Hours of Nürburgring - SP9	Rowe Racing	1	0	0	0	0	N/A	10th
2018	Deutsche Tourenwagen Masters	BMW Team RMR	20	0	1	0	2	102	9th
2018	IMSA SportsCar Championship - GTLM	BMW Team RLL	1	0	0	0	0	22	24th
2018	24 Hours of Le Mans - LMGTE Pro	BMW Team MTEK	1	0	0	0	0	N/A	11th
2018	Blancpain GT Series Endurance Cup	Walkenhorst Motorsport	1	1	0	0	1	47	4th
2018	Blancpain GT Series Endurance Cup	Rowe Racing	1	0	0	0	0	47	4th
2018–19	FIA World Endurance Championship - LMGTE Pro	BMW Team MTEK	2	0	0	0	0	4	34th
2019	Deutsche Tourenwagen Masters	BMW Team RMR	18	1	1	5	3	144	6th
2019	IMSA SportsCar Championship - GTLM	BMW Team RLL	3	1	0	0	1	85	16th
2019	Blancpain GT Series Endurance Cup	Boutsen Ginion	1	0	0	0	0	0	NC
2019	Blancpain GT Series Endurance Cup - Pro-Am	Boutsen Ginion	1	0	0	0	0	6	25th
2019	24 Hours of Le Mans - LMGTE Pro	BMW Team MTEK	1	0	0	0	0	N/A	13th
2019	24 Hours of Nürburgring - SP9	Rowe Racing	1	0	0	0	0	N/A	DNF
2020	Deutsche Tourenwagen Masters	BMW Team RBM	18	0	0	0	0	48	13th
2020	IMSA SportsCar Championship - GTLM	BMW Team RLL	1	0	0	0	0	26	15th
2020	GT World Challenge Europe Endurance Cup	Walkenhorst Motorsport	1	0	0	0	0	0	NC
2020	Intercontinental GT Challenge	Walkenhorst Motorsport	1	0	0	0	0	0	NC
2020	24 Hours of Nürburgring - SP9	Rowe Racing	1	1	0	0	1	N/A	**1st**
2020–21	Formula E	BMW i Andretti Motorsport	Reserve driver						
2021	IMSA SportsCar Championship - GTLM	BMW Team RLL	4	0	0	0	2	1251	7th
2021	Pure ETCR Championship	Romeo Ferraris/M1RA	3	1	0	0	2	159	11th
2021	GT World Challenge Europe Endurance Cup	BMW M Motorsport	1	0	0	0	0	0	NC†
2021	24 Hours of Nürburgring - SP9	Rowe Racing	1	0	0	0	0	N/A	DNF
2022	Deutsche Tourenwagen Masters	Schubert Motorsport	16	0	0	0	0	64	14th
2022	IMSA SportsCar Championship - GTD Pro	BMW M Team RLL	2	0	0	0	0	542	20th
2022	GT World Challenge Europe Endurance Cup	Rowe Racing	1	0	0	0	0	0	NC
2022	24 Hours of Nürburgring - SP9	Rowe Racing	1	0	0	0	0	N/A	DNF
2023	IMSA SportsCar Championship - GTP	BMW M Team RLL	9	0	0	0	0	2341	8th
2023	GT World Challenge Europe Endurance Cup	Rowe Racing	5	2	1	0	3	77	**2nd**
2023	24 Hours of Nürburgring - SP9	Rowe Racing	1	0	0	0	0	N/A	DNF
2023	Intercontinental GT Challenge	Team WRT	3	1	0	1	2	74	4th
2023	Intercontinental GT Challenge	ROWE Racing	1	1	0	0	1	74	4th
2024	IMSA SportsCar Championship - GTP	BMW M Team RLL	9	1	0	0	1	2537	7th
2024	GT World Challenge Europe Endurance Cup	ROWE Racing	3	0	0	0	0	10	22nd
2024	GT World Challenge America - Pro	ST Racing	1	0	0	0	0	20	13th
2025	IMSA SportsCar Championship - GTP	BMW M Team RLL	9	1	4	0	3	2679	4th
2025	GT World Challenge Europe Endurance Cup	ROWE Racing	1	0	0	0	0	13	15th
2025	24 Hours of Le Mans - Hypercar	BMW M Team WRT	Reserve driver						
2026	IMSA SportsCar Championship - GTP	BMW M Team WRT	9	0	0	0	2	2338	13th
2026	24 Hours of Le Mans - Hypercar	BMW M Team WRT	Reserve driver						
2026	Nürburgring Langstrecken-Serie - SP9	Schubert Motorsport							
2026	24 Hours of Nürburgring - SP9	Schubert Motorsport	1	0	0	0	0	N/A	7th
2026	GT World Challenge Europe Endurance Cup	ROWE Racing	1	0	0	0	0	0	NC†

^{†} As Eng was a guest driver, he was ineligible to score points. ^{*} Season still in progress.

=== Complete FIA Formula Two Championship results ===
(key) (Races in bold indicate pole position) (Races in italics indicate fastest lap)

Year	1	2	3	4	5	6	7	8	9	10	11	12	13	14	15	16	17	18	DC	Points
2009	VAL; 1; 12	VAL; 2; 3	BRN; 1; 3	BRN; 2; 9	SPA; 1 Ret	SPA; 2 Ret	**BRH**; **1**; 1	BRH; 2; 4	DON; 1; 5	DON; 2; 10	OSC; 1 Ret	OSC; 2 Ret	IMO; 1; 5	IMO; 2; 10	CAT; 1; 5	CAT; 2; 9			8th	39
2010	SIL; 1; 4	**SIL**; **2**; 1	MAR; 1; 2	**MAR**; **2**; 1	MON; 1; 11	MON; 2 Ret	ZOL; 1; 15	ZOL; 2; 12	ALG; 1; 15	ALG; 2; 6	BRH; 1; 10	BRH; 2; 1	BRN; 1; 6	BRN; 2; 18	OSC; 1; 7	OSC; 2; 9	VAL; 1; 4	VAL; 2; 11	6th	142

=== Complete ADAC GT Masters results ===
(key) (Races in bold indicate pole position) (Races in italics indicate fastest lap)

Year	Team	Car	1	2	3	4	5	6	7	8	9	10	11	12	13	14	15	16	DC	Points
2011	Callaway Competition	Corvette Z06.R GT3	OSC; 1; 15	OSC; 2; 14	SAC; 1; 12	SAC; 2; 11	ZOL; 1; 20	ZOL; 2; 28	NÜR; 1; 7	NÜR; 2 Ret	RBR; 1 Ret	RBR; 2; 22	LAU; 1; 18	LAU; 2; 26	ASS; 1; 15	ASS; 2 Ret	HOC; 1; 11	HOC; 2 Ret	39th	6
2012	MRS GT-Racing	McLaren MP4-12C GT3	OSC; 1	OSC; 2	ZAN; 1	ZAN; 2	SAC; 1 Ret	SAC; 2 DNS	NÜR; 1; 35	NÜR; 2; 25	RBR; 1 Ret	**RBR**; **2** Ret	LAU; 1	LAU; 2	NÜR; 1	NÜR; 2	HOC; 1; 10	HOC; 2; 14	43rd	1
2015	GW IT Racing Team Schütz Motorsport	Porsche 911 GT3 R	OSC; 1; 1	OSC; 2; 4	**RBR**; **1**; 5	RBR; 2; 3	SPA; 1	SPA; 2	LAU; 1	LAU; 2	NÜR; 1	NÜR; 2	SAC; 1	SAC; 2	ZAN; 1	ZAN; 2	HOC; 1	HOC; 2	26th	28
2017	BMW Team Schnitzer	BMW M6 GT3	OSC; 1; 10	**OSC**; **2**; 1	LAU; 1; 17	LAU; 2; 5	RBR; 1; 3	RBR; 2; 5	ZAN; 1; 6	ZAN; 2; 21	NÜR; 1; 9	NÜR; 2; 2	SAC; 1; 3	SAC; 2; 4	HOC; 1; 17	**HOC**; **2**; 13			4th	116

=== Complete Porsche Supercup results ===
(key) (Races in bold indicate pole position) (Races in italics indicate fastest lap)

Year	Team	1	2	3	4	5	6	7	8	9	10	11	Pos.	Points
2012	MRS GT-Racing	BHR	BHR	MON	ESP; 5	GBR	GER; 7	HUN; 6	HUN; Ret	BEL	ITA; 6		13th	41
2013	MRS GT-Racing	ESP	MON	GBR	GER	HUN	BEL	ITA; 14	UAE	UAE			NC	0‡
2014	Team Project 1	**ESP**; 2	MON; 2	**AUT**; Ret	GBR; 10	GER; 15	HUN; 9	BEL; 5	ITA; 8	USA; 5	USA; 3		5th	98
2015	Market Leader by Project 1	ESP; 4	MON; 2	AUT; 2	**GBR**; 1	HUN; 6	BEL; 2	**BEL**; 1	ITA; 6	ITA; 7	USA; C	USA; 8	1st	145

^{‡} Eng was a guest driver, therefore he was ineligible for points.

=== Complete GT World Challenge Europe results ===
==== GT World Challenge Europe Endurance Cup ====
(Races in bold indicate pole position) (Races in italics indicate fastest lap)

Year	Team	Car	Class	1	2	3	4	5	6	7	Pos.	Points
2013	MRS GT Racing	McLaren MP4-12C GT3	Pro-Am	MNZ; 45†	SIL		SPA; 6H; 46	SPA; 12H; Ret	SPA; 24H; Ret	NÜR; Ret	NC	0
2013	MRS GT Racing	McLaren MP4-12C GT3	Am			LEC; 43					37th	6
2016	ROWE Racing	BMW M6 GT3	Pro	MNZ; Ret	SIL; 3	LEC; Ret	SPA; 6H; 1	SPA; 12H; 4	SPA; 24H; 1	NÜR; 10	4th	56
2017	ROWE Racing	BMW M6 GT3	Pro	MNZ	SIL; 7	LEC; Ret	SPA; 6H; 44	SPA; 12H; 27	SPA; 24H; 33	CAT; 12	27th	6
2018	Walkenhorst Motorsport	BMW M6 GT3	Pro	MON	SIL	LEC	SPA; 6H; 4	SPA; 12H; 1	SPA; 24H; 1		4th	47
2018	ROWE Racing	BMW M6 GT3	Pro							CAT; 8	4th	47
2019	Boutsen Ginion	BMW M6 GT3	Pro-Am	MNZ	SIL; 39	LEC	SPA; 6H	SPA; 12H	SPA; 24H	CAT	25th	6
2020	Walkenhorst Motorsport	BMW M6 GT3	Pro	IMO	NÜR	SPA; 6H; 50	SPA; 12H; 53	SPA; 24H; Ret	LEC		NC	0
2021	BMW M Motorsport	BMW M4 GT3	INV	MNZ	LEC	SPA; 6H	SPA; 12H	SPA; 24H	NUR	CAT; 16	NC	0
2022	ROWE Racing	BMW M4 GT3	Pro	IMO	LEC	SPA; 6H	SPA; 12H	SPA; 24H	HOC	CAT; 9	NC‡	0‡
2023	ROWE Racing	BMW M4 GT3	Pro	**MNZ**; 1	LEC; 3	SPA; 6H; 8	SPA; 12H; 6	SPA; 24H; 1	NUR; 15	CAT; 10	2nd	77
2024	ROWE Racing	BMW M4 GT3	Pro	LEC; 12	SPA; 6H; Ret	SPA; 12H; Ret	SPA; 24H; Ret	NÜR; 5	MNZ	JED	22nd	10
2025	ROWE Racing	BMW M4 GT3 Evo	Pro	LEC	MNZ	SPA; 6H; 9	SPA; 12H; 1	SPA; 24H; 29	NÜR	CAT	15th	13
2026	ROWE Racing	BMW M4 GT3 Evo	Pro	LEC	MNZ	SPA; 6H	SPA; 12H	SPA; 24H	NÜR	ALG; 21	NC‡	0‡

==== GT World Challenge Europe Sprint Cup ====
(Races in bold indicate pole position) (Races in italics indicate fastest lap)

Year	Team	Car	Class	1	2	3	4	5	6	7	8	9	10	Pos.	Pts
2016	Rowe Racing	BMW M6 GT3	Pro	MIS; QR; 2	MIS; CR; 3	BRH; QR; Ret	BRH; CR; 16	NÜR; QR; 7	NÜR; CR; 9	HUN; QR; 21	HUN; CR; 13	CAT; QR; 8	CAT; CR; 24	11th	23
2017	Rowe Racing	BMW M6 GT3	Pro	MIS; QR; 16	MIS; CR; 6	BRH; QR; 5	BRH; CR; Ret	ZOL; QR; 14	ZOL; CR; Ret	HUN; QR; 12	HUN; CR; 11	NÜR; QR	NÜR; CR	18th	10

=== Complete 24 Hours of Spa results ===
Year	Team	Co-Drivers	Car	Class	Laps	Pos.	Class Pos.
2013	(Germany) MRS GT Racing	(Venezuela) Justino Azcarate (Brazil) Carlos Kray (Russia) Ilya Melnikov	McLaren MP4-12C GT3	Pro-Am Cup	121	DNF	DNF
2016	(Germany) ROWE Racing	(Belgium) Maxime Martin (United Kingdom) Alexander Sims	BMW M6 GT3	Pro Cup	531	**1st**	**1st**
2017	(Germany) ROWE Racing	(Belgium) Maxime Martin (United Kingdom) Alexander Sims	BMW M6 GT3	Pro Cup	498	33rd	19th
2018	(Germany) Walkenhorst Motorsport	(United Kingdom) Tom Blomqvist (Norway) Christian Krognes	BMW M6 GT3	Pro Cup	511	**1st**	**1st**
2020	(Germany) Walkenhorst Motorsport	(Netherlands) Nick Catsburg (Brazil) Augusto Farfus	BMW M6 GT3	Pro Cup	107	DNF	DNF
2023	(Germany) ROWE Racing	(Germany) Marco Wittmann (United Kingdom) Nick Yelloly	BMW M4 GT3	Pro Cup	537	**1st**	**1st**
2024	(Germany) ROWE Racing	(Germany) Marco Wittmann (United Kingdom) Nick Yelloly	BMW M4 GT3	Pro Cup	71	DNF	DNF
2025	(Germany) ROWE Racing	(United Kingdom) Daniel Harper (Germany) Max Hesse	BMW M4 GT3 EVO	Pro Cup	542	29th	11th

=== Complete IMSA SportsCar Championship results ===
(key) (Races in bold indicate pole position; races in italics indicate fastest lap)

Year	Entrant	Class	Make	Engine	1	2	3	4	5	6	7	8	9	10	11	Rank	Points	Ref
2014	GB Autosport	GTD	Porsche 911 GT America	Porsche 4.0 L Flat-6	DAY	SEB	LGA	DET	WGL	MOS	IMS	ELK	VIR	COA	PET; 11	81st	21	
2015	Wright Motorsports	GTD	Porsche 911 GT America	Porsche 4.0 L Flat-6	DAY; 3	SEB	LGA	DET	WGL	LIM	ELK	VIR	COA	PET		33rd	31	
2018	BMW Team RLL	GTLM	BMW M8 GTE	BMW S63 4.0 L Twin-turbo V8	DAY; 9	SEB	LBH	MDO	WGL	MOS	LIM	ELK	VIR	LGA	PET	24th	22	
2019	BMW Team RLL	GTLM	BMW M8 GTE	BMW S63 4.0 L Twin-turbo V8	DAY; 1	SEB; 4	LBH	MDO	WGL	MOS	LIM	ELK	VIR	LGA	PET; 9	16th	85	
2020	BMW Team RLL	GTLM	BMW M8 GTE	BMW S63 4.0 L Twin-turbo V8	DAY; 5	DAY	SEB	ELK	VIR	ATL	MDO	CLT	PET	LGA	SEB	15th	26	
2021	BMW Team RLL	GTLM	BMW M8 GTE	BMW S63 4.0 L Twin-turbo V8	DAY; 5	SEB; 2	DET	WGL; 3	WGL	LIM	ELK	LGA	LBH	VIR	PET; 5	7th	1251	
2022	BMW M Team RLL	GTD Pro	BMW M4 GT3	BMW P58 3.0 L Twin Turbo I6	DAY; 9	SEB; 4	LBH	LGA	WGL	MOS	LIM	ELK	VIR	PET		20th	542	
2023	BMW M Team RLL	GTP	BMW M Hybrid V8	BMW P66/3 4.0 L Turbo V8	DAY; 6	SEB; 8	LBH; 4	LGA; 5	WGL; 8	MOS; 8	ELK; 9	IMS; 10	PET; 8			8th	2341	
2024	BMW M Team RLL	GTP	BMW M Hybrid V8	BMW P66/3 4.0 L Turbo V8	DAY; 8	SEB; 6	LBH; 6	LGA; 9	DET; 7	WGL; 5	ELK; 7	IMS; 1	PET; 5			7th	2537	
2025	BMW M Team RLL	GTP	BMW M Hybrid V8	BMW P66/3 4.0 L Turbo V8	**DAY**; 4	**SEB**; 12	**LBH**; 3	**LGA**; 3	DET; 5	WGL; 8	ELK; 1	IMS; 4	PET; 9			4th	2679	
2026	BMW M Team WRT	GTP	BMW M Hybrid V8	BMW P66/3 4.0 L turbo V8	DAY; 8	SEB; 10	LBH; 11	LGA; 3	DET; 2	WGL; 9	ELK; 7	IMS; 10	PET; 11			13th	2338	

=== Complete 24 Hours of Nürburgring results ===
Year	Team	Co-Drivers	Car	Class	Laps	Pos.	Class Pos.
2015	(Germany) Black Falcon Team TMD Friction	(Germany) "Gerwin" (Germany) Manuel Metzger (Germany) Hannes Plesse	Porsche 911 GT3 Cup	SP7	148	13th	1st
2016	(Germany) ROWE Racing	(Belgium) Maxime Martin (United Kingdom) Alexander Sims (Germany) Dirk Werner	BMW M6 GT3	SP9	133	5th	5th
2017	(Germany) ROWE Racing	(Belgium) Maxime Martin (Germany) Marc Basseng	BMW M6 GT3	SP9	157	10th	10th
2019	(Germany) ROWE Racing	(United Kingdom) Tom Blomqvist (United States) Connor De Phillippi (Denmark) Mikkel Jensen	BMW M6 GT3	SP9	22	DNF	DNF
2020	(Germany) ROWE Racing	(Netherlands) Nicky Catsburg (United Kingdom) Alexander Sims (United Kingdom) Nick Yelloly	BMW M6 GT3	SP9	85	1st	1st
2021	(Germany) ROWE Racing	(Netherlands) Nicky Catsburg (United States) John Edwards (United Kingdom) Nick Yelloly	BMW M6 GT3	SP9	42	DNF	DNF
2022	(Germany) ROWE Racing	(United States) Connor De Phillippi (Brazil) Augusto Farfus (United Kingdom) Nick Yelloly	BMW M4 GT3	SP9 Pro	18	DNF	DNF
2023	(Germany) ROWE Racing	(United States) Connor De Phillippi (Brazil) Augusto Farfus (United Kingdom) Nick Yelloly	BMW M4 GT3	SP9 Pro	83	DNF	DNF
2026	(Germany) Schubert Motorsport	(Netherlands) Robin Frijns (Belgium) Charles Weerts (Germany) Marco Wittmann	BMW M4 GT3 Evo	SP9 Pro	154	8th	7th

=== Complete 24 Hours of Le Mans results ===
Year	Team	Co-Drivers	Car	Class	Laps	Pos.	Class Pos.
2016	(Germany) Dempsey-Proton Racing	(Denmark) Michael Christensen (Austria) Richard Lietz	Porsche 911 RSR	GTE; Pro	329	31st	8th
2018	(Germany) BMW Team MTEK	(Netherlands) Nick Catsburg (Germany) Martin Tomczyk	BMW M8 GTE	GTE; Pro	332	33rd	11th
2019	(Germany) BMW Team MTEK	(Netherlands) Nick Catsburg (Germany) Martin Tomczyk	BMW M8 GTE	GTE; Pro	309	47th	13th

=== Complete Deutsche Tourenwagen Masters results ===
(key) (Races in bold indicate pole position) (Races in italics indicate fastest lap)

Year	Team	Car	1	2	3	4	5	6	7	8	9	10	11	12	13	14	15	16	17	18	19	20	Pos	Points
2018	BMW Team RMR	BMW M4 DTM	HOC; 1; 16	HOC; 2; 14	LAU; 1; 3	**LAU**; **2**; 7	HUN; 1; 18	HUN; 2; 3	NOR; 1; 5	NOR; 2; 11	ZAN; 1; 14	ZAN; 2; 4	BRH; 1; 5	BRH; 2; 7	MIS; 1; 8	MIS; 2; 16	NÜR; 1; 16	NÜR; 2; 8	SPL; 1; 8	SPL; 2; 9	HOC; 1; 12	HOC; 2; 8	9th	102
2019	BMW Team RMR	BMW M4 Turbo DTM	HOC; 1; 14	**HOC**; **2**; 4	ZOL; 1; 1	ZOL; 2; 2	MIS; 1; 7	MIS; 2; 2	NOR; 1; 7	NOR; 2; 5	ASS; 1; 4	ASS; 2; 13	BRH; 1; 6	BRH; 2; 5	LAU; 1; 5	LAU; 2; 10	NÜR; 1; 13	NÜR; 2; 8	HOC; 1 Ret	HOC; 2; 14			6th	144
2020	BMW Team RBM	BMW M4 Turbo DTM	SPA; 1; 6	SPA; 2; 11	LAU; 1; 9	LAU; 2; 7	LAU; 1; 8	LAU; 2; 12	ASS; 1; 13	ASS; 2; 9	NÜR; 1; 6	NÜR; 2; 10	NÜR; 1; 4	NÜR; 2; 12	ZOL; 1; 9	ZOL; 2; 14	ZOL; 1; 12	ZOL; 2 Ret	HOC; 1; 9	HOC; 2; 10			13th	48
2022	Schubert Motorsport	BMW M4 GT3	ALG; 1; 9	ALG; 2 Ret	LAU; 1 Ret	LAU; 2; 4	IMO; 1; 12	IMO; 2; 6	NOR; 1; 5	NOR; 2; 11	NÜR; 1; 6	NÜR; 2 Ret	SPA; 1 Ret	SPA; 2; 7	RBR; 1; 12	RBR; 2; 5	HOC; 1; 6	HOC; 2 Ret					14th	64

=== Complete FIA World Endurance Championship results ===
(key) (Races in bold indicate pole position; races in italics indicate fastest lap)

Year	Entrant	Class	Chassis	Engine	1	2	3	4	5	6	7	8	Rank	Points
2018–19	BMW Team MTEK	LMGTE Pro	BMW M8 GTE	BMW S63 4.0 L Turbo V8	SPA	LMS; 9	SIL	FUJ	SHA	SEB	SPA	LMS; 15	34th	4

Sporting positions
Preceded by Christian Vietoris	Formula BMW World Final; Winner; 2007	Succeeded by Alexander Rossi
Preceded by Kévin Estre	Porsche Carrera Cup Germany; Champion; 2014–2015	Succeeded by Sven Müller
Preceded by Earl Bamber	Porsche Supercup; Champion; 2015	Succeeded by Sven Müller
