= 2020 24 Hours of Spa =

(Belgium) 2020 24 Hours of Spa
Event Information
- Round 3 of 4 in the 2020 Intercontinental GT Challenge
- Date: 22–25 October 2020 Intercontinental GT Challenge
- Location: Spa-Francorchamps, Wallonia, Belgium
- Venue: Circuit de Spa-Francorchamps

Results
Race 1
Distance	527 laps	3691.108 km
Pole position	(Italy) Raffaele Marciello (France) AKKA ASP	2:32.166
Winner	(New Zealand) Earl Bamber (United Kingdom) Nick Tandy (Belgium) Laurens Vanthoor (Germany) Rowe Racing	24:00:38.727

The 2020 24 Hours of Spa (also known as Total 24 Hours of Spa for sponsorship reasons) was the 73rd running of the 24 Hours of Spa. It took place on 22–25 October 2020. Although it was previously scheduled to held on 25–26 July, it was announced on 15 April that the race would be postponed due to the COVID-19 pandemic.

== Background ==
The 72nd running of the 24 Hours of Spa took place on 22–25 October 2020. It was previously scheduled to held on 25–26 July, but in March the race was postponed to October due to the COVID-19 pandemic. This will be the first time that the race will be held in October. The race was set to be unique as it would run for a 25 hours duration due to the race being held on the weekend when the clocks change. However, this idea was pulled when it became clear that the event was not permitted to allow spectators to the race. The race will be the third round of the GT World Challenge Europe Endurance Cup and also the third round of the Intercontinental GT Challenge. The official test days took place on the 29 and 30 September. The GT4 European, Lamborghini Super Trofeo, Formula Renault Eurocup and TCR Europe series will all run support races at the event.

Following practice and qualifying track limits was an issue. Drivers were told initially that only track limits would be enforced at the Eau Rouge sequence. However due to "exaggerated abuse" including running out of the bus stop chicane across 10 metres of tarmac runoff up to the barrier, drivers were told that the white lines were the limit of the track and that the cars must remain in contact with the track. The exceptions were at Eau Rouge, Speaker's or No Name Corner, Blanchimont and the exit of the Bus Stop where the drivers were permitted to use the kerbs beyond the white line. Drivers were allowed 3 infringements of the rule before being given a drive through penalty. Any driver gaining an advantage and not giving it back would be penalised 5 or 10 seconds at the next pit stop. The warnings would be reset every 6 hours.

== Entry list ==
No.	Entrant	Car	Driver 1	Driver 2	Driver 3	Driver 4
Pro
3	(United States) K-Pax Racing	Bentley Continental GT3	(South Africa) Jordan Pepper	(France) Jules Gounon	(Belgium) Maxime Soulet	
4	(Germany) Mercedes-AMG Team HRT	Mercedes-AMG GT3 Evo	(Germany) Maro Engel	(Germany) Luca Stolz	(France) Vincent Abril	
9	(United States) K-Pax Racing	Bentley Continental GT3	(Brazil) Rodrigo Baptista	(Spain) Andy Soucek	(Portugal) Álvaro Parente	
12	(United Arab Emirates) GPX Racing	Porsche 911 GT3 R	(Australia) Matt Campbell	(France) Patrick Pilet	(France) Mathieu Jaminet	
14	(Switzerland) Emil Frey Racing	Lamborghini Huracán GT3 Evo	(Austria) Norbert Siedler	(Canada) Mikaël Grenier	(Switzerland) Ricardo Feller	
21	(Hong Kong) KCMG	Porsche 911 GT3 R	(Australia) Josh Burdon	(Switzerland) Alexandre Imperatori	(Italy) Edoardo Liberati	
22	(Germany) Frikadelli Racing Team	Porsche 911 GT3 R	(Germany) Jörg Bergmeister	(France) Frédéric Makowiecki	(Norway) Dennis Olsen	
25	(France) Audi Sport Team Saintéloc Racing	Audi R8 LMS Evo	(Germany) Markus Winkelhock	(France) Dorian Boccolacci	(Germany) Christopher Haase	
27	(Chinese Taipei) HubAuto Corsa	Ferrari 488 GT3 Evo 2020	(Brazil) Marcos Gomes	(United Kingdom) Tom Blomqvist	(Japan) Kamui Kobayashi	
29	(Italy) JAS Motorsport	Honda NSX GT3	(United States) Dane Cameron	(Netherlands) Renger van der Zande	(Germany) Mario Farnbacher	
30	(Belgium) Audi Sport Team WRT	Audi R8 LMS Evo	(Germany) Dennis Marschall	(Austria) Ferdinand Habsburg	(France) Matthieu Vaxivière	
31	(Belgium) Audi Sport Team WRT	Audi R8 LMS Evo	(Belgium) Dries Vanthoor	(Germany) Christopher Mies	(South Africa) Kelvin van der Linde	
32	Belgium Audi Club Team WRT	Audi R8 LMS Evo	(Switzerland) Edoardo Mortara	(Belgium) Charles Weerts	(Germany) Frank Stippler	
34	(Germany) Walkenhorst Motorsport	BMW M6 GT3	(Brazil) Augusto Farfus	(Netherlands) Nicky Catsburg	(Austria) Philipp Eng	
35	(Germany) Walkenhorst Motorsport	BMW M6 GT3	(Germany) Martin Tomczyk	(United Kingdom) David Pittard	(United Kingdom) Nick Yelloly	
40	(United Arab Emirates) GPX Racing	Porsche 911 GT3 R	(France) Romain Dumas	(Switzerland) Louis Delétraz	(Austria) Thomas Preining	
47	(Hong Kong) KCMG	Porsche 911 GT3 R	(Austria) Richard Lietz	(Denmark) Michael Christensen	(France) Kevin Estre	
51	(Italy) AF Corse	Ferrari 488 GT3 Evo 2020	(United Kingdom) James Calado	(Denmark) Nicklas Nielsen	(Italy) Alessandro Pier Guidi	
54	(Italy) Dinamic Motorsport	Porsche 911 GT3 R	(Germany) Sven Muller	(Germany) Christian Engelhart	(Italy) Matteo Cairoli	
63	(China) Orange1 FFF Racing Team	Lamborghini Huracán GT3 Evo	(Denmark) Dennis Lind	(Italy) Marco Mapelli	(Italy) Andrea Caldarelli	
66	(Germany) Audi Sport Attempto Racing	Audi R8 LMS Evo	(Italy) Mattia Drudi	(Switzerland) Patric Niederhauser	(Belgium) Frédéric Vervisch	
69	(United Kingdom) Optimum Motorsport	McLaren 720S GT3	(United Kingdom) Ollie Wilkinson	(United Kingdom) Joe Osborne	(United Kingdom) Rob Bell	
72	(Russia) SMP Racing	Ferrari 488 GT3 Evo 2020	(Spain) Miguel Molina	(Russia) Sergey Sirotkin	(Italy) Davide Rigon	
88	(France) Mercedes-AMG Team AKKA ASP	Mercedes-AMG GT3 Evo	(Italy) Raffaele Marciello	(Russia) Timur Boguslavskiy	(Brazil) Felipe Fraga	
98	(Germany) Rowe Racing	Porsche 911 GT3 R	(Belgium) Laurens Vanthoor	(United Kingdom) Nick Tandy	(New Zealand) Earl Bamber	
99	(Germany) Rowe Racing	Porsche 911 GT3 R	(Austria) Klaus Bachler	(Germany) Dirk Werner	(France) Julien Andlauer	
107	(France) Classic and Modern Racing	Bentley Continental GT3	(France) Pierre-Alexandre Provost	(France) Nelson Panciatici	(United Kingdom) Seb Morris	
163	(Switzerland) Emil Frey Racing	Lamborghini Huracán GT3 Evo	(Spain) Albert Costa	(Italy) Giacomo Altoè	(France) Franck Perera	
Pro-Am
10	(Belgium) Boutsen Ginion Racing	BMW M6 GT3	(Saudi Arabia) Karim Ojjeh	(France) Gilles Vannelet	(Belgium) Benjamin Lessennes	(Germany) Jens Klingmann
19	(China) Orange1 FFF Racing Team	Lamborghini Huracán GT3 Evo	(Italy) Luigi Moccia	(Italy) Raffaele Giammaria	(United Kingdom) Phil Keen	(Japan) Hiroshi Hamaguchi
20	(Germany) SPS Automotive Performance	Mercedes-AMG GT3 Evo	(United States) George Kurtz	(Germany) Valentin Pierburg	(Austria) Dominik Baumann	(United States) Colin Braun
52	(Italy) AF Corse	Ferrari 488 GT3 Evo 2020	(Netherlands) Niek Hommerson	(Belgium) Louis Machiels	(Italy) Andrea Bertolini	(Brazil) Daniel Serra
74	(United Kingdom) Ram Racing	Mercedes-AMG GT3 Evo	(United Kingdom) Tom Onslow-Cole	(United Kingdom) Callum MacLeod	(Austria) Martin Konrad	(Netherlands) Remon Vos
77	(United Kingdom) Barwell Motorsport	Lamborghini Huracán GT3 Evo	(United Kingdom) Sandy Mitchell	(United Kingdom) Ricky Collard	(United Kingdom) Rob Collard	(Russia) Leo Machitski
87	(France) AKKA ASP	Mercedes-AMG GT3 Evo	(France) Jean-Luc Beaubelique	(France) Fabien Barthez	(France) Jim Pla	(France) Thomas Drouet
93	(United Kingdom) Sky Tempesta Racing	Ferrari 488 GT3 Evo 2020	(Hong Kong) Jonathan Hui	(United Kingdom) Chris Froggatt	(Italy) Eddie Cheever III	(Italy) Giancarlo Fisichella
111	(Poland) JP Motorsport	Mercedes-AMG GT3 Evo	(Poland) Patryk Krupinski	(Germany) Jens Liebhauser	(Austria) Mathias Lauda	(Austria) Christian Klien
188	(United Kingdom) Garage 59	Aston Martin Vantage AMR GT3	(Sweden) Alex West	(United Kingdom) Chris Goodwin	(United Kingdom) Jonathan Adam	(Belgium) Maxime Martin
488	(Germany) Rinaldi Racing	Ferrari 488 GT3 Evo 2020	(Germany) Pierre Ehret	(Germany) Daniel Keilwitz	(Italy) Rino Mastronardi	(South Africa) David Perel
991	(Germany) Herberth Motorsport	Porsche 911 GT3 R	(Switzerland) Daniel Allemann	(Germany) Ralf Bohn	(Germany) Alfred Renauer	(Germany) Robert Renauer
Silver
5	(Germany) Haupt Racing Team	Mercedes-AMG GT3 Evo	(Italy) Gabriele Piana	(Italy) Michele Beretta	(Russia) Sergey Afanasyev	(Germany) Hubert Haupt
11	(United Kingdom) Team Parker Racing	Bentley Continental GT3	(United Kingdom) Euan McKay	(Denmark) Nicolai Kjærgaard	(United Kingdom) Frank Bird	
15	(France) Tech 1 Racing	Lexus RC F GT3	(France) Thomas Neubauer	(France) Timothe Buret	(France) Aurélien Panis	
33	Belgium Audi Club Team WRT	Audi R8 LMS Evo	(Netherlands) Rik Breukers	(United Kingdom) Stuart Hall	(Denmark) Benjamin Goethe	
55	(Germany) Attempto Racing	Audi R8 LMS Evo	(Austria) Nicolas Scholl	(France) Simon Gachet	(Germany) Alex Aka	(United Kingdom) Finlay Hutchison
56	(Italy) Dinamic Motorsport	Porsche 911 GT3 R	(Belgium) Adrien de Leener	(Denmark) Mikkel O. Pedersen	(Italy) Andrea Rizzoli	(Monaco) Cedric Sbirrazzuoli
78	(United Kingdom) Barwell Motorsport	Lamborghini Huracán GT3 Evo	(Denmark) Frederik Schandorff	(United Kingdom) Alex MacDowall	(Finland) Patrick Kujala	
84	(Germany) HTP Motorsport	Mercedes-AMG GT3 Evo	(Netherlands) Indy Dontje	(United States) Russell Ward	(United Kingdom) Philip Ellis	
89	(France) AKKA ASP	Mercedes-AMG GT3 Evo	(Switzerland) Alex Fontana	(Switzerland) Lucas Légeret	(Chile) Benjamín Hites	
90	(Argentina) MadPanda Motorsport	Mercedes-AMG GT3 Evo	(Argentina) Ezequiel Pérez Companc	(Mexico) Ricardo Sanchez	(Finland) Puhakka Juuso	(Germany) Patrick Assenheimer
159	(United Kingdom) Garage 59	Aston Martin Vantage AMR GT3	(Canada) Roman De Angelis	(United Kingdom) Andrew Watson	(United Kingdom) James Pull	(France) Valentin Hasse-Clot
555	(China) Orange1 FFF Racing Team	Lamborghini Huracán GT3 Evo	(Belgium) Baptiste Moulin	(United Kingdom) Taylor Proto	(France) Hugo Chevalier	(France) Florian Latorre
Am
26	(France) Saintéloc Racing	Audi R8 LMS Evo	(Belgium) Pierre Yves Paque	(Belgium) Gregory Paisse	(France) Christopher Cresp	(France) Steven Palette
108	(France) Classic and Modern Racing	Bentley Continental GT3	(France) Clement Mateu	(France) Romano Ricci	(France) Stephane Tribaudini	(Belgium) Stéphane Lémeret
129	(Italy) Raton Racing	Lamborghini Huracán GT3 Evo	(Switzerland) Christoph Lenz	(France) Michael Petit	(Italy) Stefano Costantini	(Switzerland) Lucas Mauron
918	(Germany) Herberth Motorsport	Porsche 911 GT3 R	(Germany) Jürgen Häring	(Greece) Dimitrios Konstantinou	(Germany) Michael Joos	(Germany) Marco Seefried

== Results ==
=== Super Pole ===
Pos.	No.	Team	Driver	Car	Time	Gap
1	**88**	**(France) AKKA ASP**	**(Italy) Raffaele Marciello**	**Mercedes-AMG GT3 Evo**	**2:32.166**	
2	31	(Belgium) Team WRT	(South Africa) Kelvin van der Linde	Audi R8 LMS Evo	2:32.386	+0.220
3	4	(Germany) Haupt Racing Team	(Germany) Maro Engel	Mercedes-AMG GT3 Evo	2:32.522	+0.356
4	66	(Germany) Attempto Racing	(Belgium) Frédéric Vervisch	Audi R8 LMS Evo	2:32.881	+0.715
5	25	(France) Saintéloc Racing	(Germany) Christopher Haase	Audi R8 LMS Evo	2:32.979	+0.813
6	40	(United Arab Emirates) GPX Racing	(Austria) Thomas Preining	Porsche 911 GT3 R	2:32.990	+0.824
7	51	(Italy) AF Corse	(Italy) Alessandro Pier Guidi	Ferrari 488 GT3 Evo 2020	2:33.024	+0.858
8	63	(China) FFF Racing Team	(Italy) Andrea Caldarelli	Lamborghini Huracán GT3 Evo	2:33.294	+1.128
9	163	(Switzerland) Emil Frey Racing	(Spain) Alberto Costa	Lamborghini Huracán GT3 Evo	2:33.400	+1.234
10	47	(Hong Kong) KCMG	(France) Kévin Estre	Porsche 911 GT3 R	2:33.404	+1.238
11	12	(United Arab Emirates) GPX Racing	(France) Patrick Pilet	Porsche 911 GT3 R	2:33.541	+1.375
12	32	(Belgium) Team WRT	(Belgium) Charles Weerts	Audi R8 LMS Evo	2:33.568	+1.402
13	99	(Germany) Rowe Racing	(France) Julien Andlauer	Porsche 911 GT3 R	2:33.768	+1.602
14	22	(Germany) Frikadelli Racing Team	(France) Frédéric Makowiecki	Porsche 911 GT3 R	2:33.780	+1.614
15	54	(Italy) Dinamic Motorsport	(Italy) Matteo Cairoli	Porsche 911 GT3 R	2:34.119	+1.953
16	27	(Chinese Taipei) HubAuto Corsa	(Sweden) Tom Blomqvist	Ferrari 488 GT3 Evo 2020	2:34.170	+2.004
17	30	(Belgium) Team WRT	(France) Matthieu Vaxivière	Audi R8 LMS Evo	2:34.280	+2.114
18	72	(Russia) SMP Racing	(Italy) Davide Rigon	Ferrari 488 GT3 Evo 2020	2:34.338	+2.172
19	89	(France) AKKA ASP	(Chile) Benjamín Hites	Mercedes-AMG GT3 Evo	2:34.791	+2.625
20	98	(Germany) Rowe Racing	(Belgium) Laurens Vanthoor	Porsche 911 GT3 R	2:35.546	+3.380

=== Race ===
Class winners denoted in bold and with ‡

Pos	Class	No	Team	Drivers	Car	Laps	Time/Reason
1	P	**98**	**(Germany) Rowe Racing**	**(New Zealand) Earl Bamber (United Kingdom) Nick Tandy (Belgium) Laurens Vanthoor**	**Porsche 911 GT3 R**	**527**	**24:00:38.727‡**
2	P	66	(Germany) Attempto Racing	(Italy) Mattia Drudi (Switzerland) Patric Niederhauser (Belgium) Frédéric Vervisch	Audi R8 LMS Evo	527	+4.687
3	P	54	(Italy) Dinamic Motorsport	(Italy) Matteo Cairoli (Germany) Christian Engelhart (Germany) Sven Müller	Porsche 911 GT3 R	527	+28.750
4	P	12	(United Arab Emirates) GPX Racing	(Australia) Matt Campbell (France) Mathieu Jaminet (France) Patrick Pilet	Porsche 911 GT3 R	527	+36.882
5	P	51	(Italy) AF Corse	(United Kingdom) James Calado (Denmark) Nicklas Nielsen (Italy) Alessandro Pier Guidi	Ferrari 488 GT3 Evo 2020	527	+38.225
6	P	25	(France) Saintéloc Racing	(France) Dorian Boccolacci (Germany) Christopher Haase (Germany) Markus Winkelhock	Audi R8 LMS Evo	527	+38.481
7	P	4	(Germany) Haupt Racing Team	(France) Vincent Abril (Germany) Maro Engel (Germany) Luca Stolz	Mercedes-AMG GT3 Evo	527	+41.357
8	P	22	(Germany) Frikadelli Racing Team	(Germany) Jörg Bergmeister (France) Frédéric Makowiecki (Norway) Dennis Olsen	Porsche 911 GT3 R	527	+1:39.997
9	P	29	(Italy) JAS Motorsport	(United States) Dane Cameron (Germany) Mario Farnbacher (Netherlands) Renger van der Zande	Honda NSX GT3	526	+1 Lap
10	P	3	(United States) K-Pax Racing	(France) Jules Gounon (Belgium) Maxime Soulet (South Africa) Jordan Pepper	Bentley Continental GT3	525	+2 Laps
11	P	40	(United Arab Emirates) GPX Racing	(Switzerland) Louis Delétraz (France) Romain Dumas (Austria) Thomas Preining	Porsche 911 GT3 R	525	+2 Laps
12	P	9	(United States) K-Pax Racing	(Brazil) Rodrigo Baptista (Portugal) Álvaro Parente (Spain) Andy Soucek	Bentley Continental GT3	524	+3 Laps
13	P	47	(Hong Kong) KCMG	(Denmark) Michael Christensen (France) Kévin Estre (Austria) Richard Lietz	Porsche 911 GT3 R	522	+5 Laps
14	P	30	(Belgium) Team WRT	(Austria) Ferdinand von Habsburg (Germany) Dennis Marschall (France) Matthieu Vaxivière	Audi R8 LMS Evo	522	+5 Laps
15	PA	**77**	**(United Kingdom) Barwell Motorsport**	**(United Kingdom) Ricky Collard (United Kingdom) Rob Collard (Russia) Leo Machitski (United Kingdom) Sandy Mitchell**	**Lamborghini Huracán GT3 Evo**	**521**	**+6 Laps‡**
16	P	14	(Switzerland) Emil Frey Racing	(Switzerland) Ricardo Feller (Canada) Mikaël Grenier (Austria) Norbert Siedler	Lamborghini Huracán GT3 Evo	520	+7 Laps
17	PA	93	(United Kingdom) Tempesta Racing	(Italy) Eddie Cheever III (Italy) Giancarlo Fisichella (United Kingdom) Chris Froggatt (Hong Kong) Jonathan Hui	Ferrari 488 GT3 Evo 2020	520	+7 Laps
18	S	**5**	**(Germany) Haupt Racing Team**	**(Russia) Sergey Afanasyev (Italy) Michele Beretta (Germany) Hubert Haupt (Italy) Gabriele Piana**	**Mercedes-AMG GT3 Evo**	**520**	**+7 Laps‡**
19 DNF	P	72	(Russia) SMP Racing	(Spain) Miguel Molina (Italy) Davide Rigon (Russia) Sergey Sirotkin	Ferrari 488 GT3 Evo 2020	519	Collision damage
20	PA	188	(United Kingdom) Garage 59	(United Kingdom) Jonathan Adam (United Kingdom) Chris Goodwin (Belgium) Maxime Martin (Sweden) Alexander West	Aston Martin Vantage AMR GT3	519	+8 Laps
21	S	84	(Germany) HTP Motorsport	(Netherlands) Indy Dontje (United Kingdom) Philip Ellis (United States) Russell Ward	Mercedes-AMG GT3 Evo	517	+10 Laps
22	PA	488	(Germany) Rinaldi Racing	(Germany) Pierre Ehret (Germany) Daniel Keilwitz (Italy) Rino Mastronardi (South Africa) David Perel	Ferrari 488 GT3 Evo 2020	516	+11 Laps
23 DNF	P	27	(Chinese Taipei) HubAuto Corsa	(Sweden) Tom Blomqvist (Brazil) Marcos Gomes (Japan) Kamui Kobayashi	Ferrari 488 GT3 Evo 2020	515	Drivetrain
24	S	555	(China) FFF Racing Team	(France) Hugo Chevalier (France) Florian Latorre (Belgium) Baptiste Moulin (United Kingdom) Taylor Proto	Lamborghini Huracán GT3 Evo	514	+13 Laps
25	PA	10	(Belgium) Boutsen Ginion Racing	(Belgium) Benjamin Lessennes (Germany) Jens Klingmann (Saudi Arabia) Karim Ojjeh (France) Gilles Vannelet	BMW M6 GT3	514	+13 Laps
26	S	90	(Argentina) MadPanda Motorsport	(Germany) Patrick Assenheimer (Argentina) Ezequiel Pérez Companc (Finland) Juuso Puhakka (Mexico) Ricardo Sanchez	Mercedes-AMG GT3 Evo	510	+17 Laps
27	PA	20	(Germany) SPS Automotive Performance	(Austria) Dominik Baumann (United States) Colin Braun (United States) George Kurtz (Germany) Valentin Pierburg	Mercedes-AMG GT3 Evo	509	+18 Laps
28	S	11	(United Kingdom) Team Parker Racing	(United Kingdom) Frank Bird (Denmark) Nicolai Kjærgaard (United Kingdom) Euan McKay	Bentley Continental GT3	500	+27 Laps
29	S	89	(France) AKKA ASP	(Switzerland) Alex Fontana (Chile) Benjamín Hites (Switzerland) Lucas Légeret	Mercedes-AMG GT3 Evo	497	+30 Laps
30	Am	**108**	**(France) Classic and Modern Racing**	**(Belgium) Stéphane Lémeret (France) Clément Mateu (France) Romano Ricci (France) Stéphane Tribaudini**	**Bentley Continental GT3**	**497**	**+30 Laps‡**
31 DNF	P	163	(Switzerland) Emil Frey Racing	(Italy) Giacomo Altoè (Spain) Albert Costa (France) Franck Perera	Lamborghini Huracán GT3 Evo	496	Accident damage
32 DNF	P	99	(Germany) Rowe Racing	(France) Julien Andlauer (Austria) Klaus Bachler (Germany) Dirk Werner	Porsche 911 GT3 R	495	Accident damage
33	P	107	(France) Classic and Modern Racing	(France) Pierre-Alexandre Jean (France) Nelson Panciatici (United Kingdom) Seb Morris	Bentley Continental GT3	476	+51 Laps
34 DNF	S	33	(Belgium) Team WRT	(Netherlands) Rik Breukers (Denmark) Benjamin Goethe (United Kingdom) Stuart Hall	Audi R8 LMS Evo	453	Accident
35 DNF	PA	52	(Italy) AF Corse	(Italy) Andrea Bertolini (Netherlands) Niek Hommerson (Belgium) Louis Machiels (Brazil) Daniel Serra	Ferrari 488 GT3 Evo 2020	380	Accident
36 DNF	S	78	(United Kingdom) Barwell Motorsport	(Finland) Patrick Kujala (United Kingdom) Alex MacDowall (Denmark) Frederik Schandorff	Lamborghini Huracán GT3 Evo	377	Collision
37 DNF	PA	991	(Germany) Herberth Motorsport	(Switzerland) Daniel Allemann (Germany) Ralf Bohn (Germany) Alfred Renauer (Germany) Robert Renauer	Porsche 911 GT3 R	375	Collision
38 DNF	P	63	(China) FFF Racing Team	(Italy) Andrea Caldarelli (Italy) Marco Mapelli (Denmark) Dennis Lind	Lamborghini Huracán GT3 Evo	371	Accident
DNF	P	35	(Germany) Walkenhorst Motorsport	(United Kingdom) David Pittard (Germany) Martin Tomczyk (United Kingdom) Nick Yelloly	BMW M6 GT3	359	Accident
DNF	Am	129	(Italy) Raton Racing	(Italy) Stefano Costantini (Switzerland) Christopher Lenz (Switzerland) Lucas Mauron (France) Michael Petit	Lamborghini Huracán GT3 Evo	318	Accident
DNF	PA	87	(France) AKKA ASP	(France) Fabian Barthez (France) Jean-Luc Beaubelique (France) Thomas Drouet (France) Jim Pla	Mercedes-AMG GT3 Evo	275	Accident damage
DNF	P	88	(France) AKKA ASP	(Russia) Timur Boguslavskiy (Brazil) Felipe Fraga (Italy) Raffaele Marciello	Mercedes-AMG GT3 Evo	263	Brakes
DNF	P	21	(Hong Kong) KCMG	(Australia) Josh Burdon (Switzerland) Alexandre Imperatori (Italy) Edoardo Liberati	Porsche 911 GT3 R	253	Vibration
DNF	S	15	(France) Tech 1 Racing	(France) Timothé Buret (France) Thomas Neubauer (France) Aurélien Panis	Lexus RC F GT3	213	Mechanical
DNF	S	159	(United Kingdom) Garage 59	(Canada) Roman de Angelis (France) Valentin Hasse-Clot (United Kingdom) James Pull (United Kingdom) Andrew Watson	Aston Martin Vantage AMR GT3	201	Accident damage
DNF	Am	918	(Germany) Herberth Motorsport	(Germany) Jürgen Häring (Germany) Michael Joos (Greece) Dimitrios Konstantinou (Germany) Marco Seefried	Porsche 911 GT3 R	158	Accident damage
DNF	P	69	(United Kingdom) Optimum Motorsport	(United Kingdom) Rob Bell (United Kingdom) Joe Osborne (United Kingdom) Ollie Wilkinson	McLaren 720S GT3	157	Collision damage
DNF	S	56	(Italy) Dinamic Motorsport	(Belgium) Adrian de Leener (Denmark) Mikkel Pedersen (Italy) Andrea Rizzoli (Monaco) Cedric Sbirrazzuoli	Porsche 911 GT3 R	148	Accident
DNF	P	31	(Belgium) Team WRT	(South Africa) Kelvin van der Linde (Germany) Christopher Mies (Belgium) Dries Vanthoor	Audi R8 LMS Evo	138	Drivetrain
DNF	PA	111	(Poland) JP Motorsport	(Austria) Mathias Lauda (Germany) Jens Liebhauser (Austria) Christian Klien (Poland) Patryk Krupiński	Mercedes-AMG GT3 Evo	135	Accident
DNF	Am	26	(France) Saintéloc Racing	(France) Christophe Cresp (Belgium) Gregory Paisse (France) Steven Palette (Belgium) Pierre Yves Paque	Audi R8 LMS Evo	126	Accident
DNF	PA	74	(United Kingdom) Ram Racing	(Austria) Martin Konrad (United Kingdom) Callum MacLeod (United Kingdom) Tom Onslow-Cole (Netherlands) Remon Vos	Mercedes-AMG GT3 Evo	121	Accident damage
DNF	P	34	(Germany) Walkenhorst Motorsport	(Netherlands) Nick Catsburg (Austria) Philipp Eng (Brazil) Augusto Farfus, Jr.	BMW M6 GT3	107	Collision damage
DNF	P	32	(Belgium) Team WRT	(Switzerland) Edoardo Mortara (Germany) Frank Stippler (Belgium) Charles Weerts	Audi R8 LMS Evo	70	Collision
DNF	PA	19	(China) FFF Racing Team	(Italy) Raffaele Giammaria (Japan) Hiroshi Hamaguchi (United Kingdom) Phil Keen (Italy) Luigi Moccia	Lamborghini Huracán GT3 Evo	33	Gearbox
DNF	S	55	(Germany) Attempto Racing	(Germany) Alex Aka (France) Simon Gachet (United Kingdom) Finlay Hutchison (Austria) Nicolas Schöll	Audi R8 LMS Evo	9	Puncture
Final Classification

Intercontinental GT Challenge
Previous race: 2020 Indianapolis 8 Hours	2020 season	Next race: 2020 Kyalami 9 Hours
