= Rowe Racing =

German motor racing team

(Germany) Rowe Racing
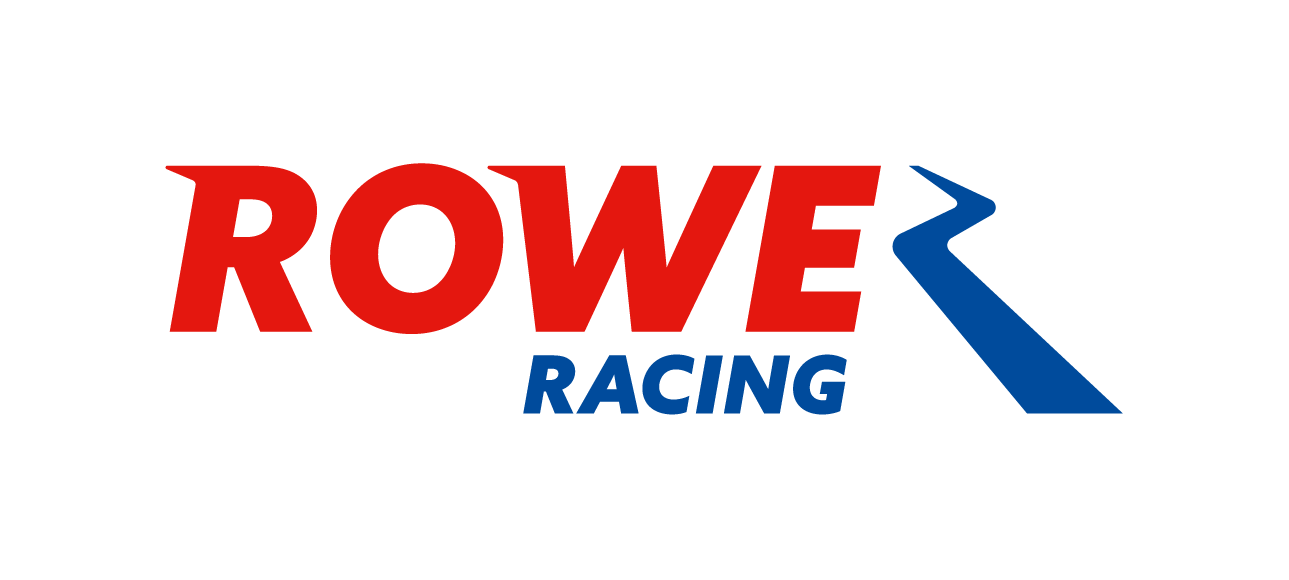
- Founded: 2011
- Base: Sankt Ingbert, Saarland
- Team principal(s): Michael Zehe; Hans-Peter Naundorf
- Current series: GT World Challenge Europe; Nürburgring Endurance Series

ROWE Racing is the motor racing team of the German lubricant manufacturer Rowe Mineralölwerk. Since 2011, ROWE Racing has competed in series such as the Nürburgring Endurance Series, the GT World Challenge Europe (former Blancpain GT Series), the Deutsche Tourenwagen Masters and the 24 Hours Nürburgring. In 2020 it won both the Nürburgring 24 Hours and the Spa 24 Hours. In 2023 it won the Spa 24 Hours for the third time.

== Team ==
The team was founded in 2011 by Michael Zehe and Hans-Peter Naundorf. The operations of the racing team are made by Motorsport Competence Group AG (MCG AG) who is a development partner and service provider for the automotive and racing area.

Under the name Team ROWE Motorsport the team entered the VLN championship in 2009. Team co-owner Michael Zehe ran an Audi TT with Franz Rohr. In 2010 Michael Zehe, Marco Schelp and Alexander Roloff ran the Porsche 911 GT3 Cup S during the season with occasional support from Mark Bullitt. Bullitt was a racing driver living in Germany but racing under an American licence. The team achieved a number of top ten overall finishes.

=== Mercedes-Benz years ===
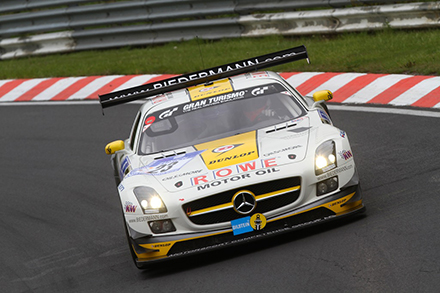
The Rowe Racing Mercedes SLS AMG GT3 at the 41. ADAC Zurich 24h Rennen

Late 2010 Naundorf was contacted by ROWE Mineralölwerk GmbH CEO Michael Toe about entering a Mercedes-Benz SLS AMG GT3 in GT races. Naundorf worked with Florian Rhotert to enter ROWE Racing in the VLN, a championship solely racing at the Nürburgring Nordschleife. The team entered three cars (one co-entered with Christian Mamerow) in the first race of the season, the 58th ADAC Westfalenfahrt. In the GT3 class the team entered two SLS AMG GT3 cars and one Porsche 911 GT3 Cup S. Only one SLS AMG GT3 took the start, which subsequently failed to finish. The Porsche finished the race in seventeenth place with drivers Michael Zehe, Alexander Roloff and Marco Schelp. After the first race the team decided to no longer enter the Porsche and focusing on entering three Mercedes-Benz sportscars. In the second round of the season the co-entered Mamerow/ROWE Racing Mercedes-Benz SLS AMG GT3 won the race with Mamerow and Armin Hahne driving. The team with Zehe, Roloff and Roland Rehfeld won their second race near the end of the season during the 34th RCM DMV Grenzlandrennen The teams best placed car in the 2011 24 Hours of Nürburgring finished seventeenth, the other two cars failed to finish.

Jan Seyffarth joined the team in VLN in 2012. Seyffarth and Roloff won the 52nd ADAC Reinoldus-Langstreckenrennen with only a tiny margin of 0.338 seconds. When Thomas Jäger joined the team for the 6 hour ADAC Ruhr-Pokal-Rennen the team scored their second victory. The 2013 24 Hours of Nürburgring was very successful for the German team. ROWE Racing finished third and fourth. For the 2013 season Seyffarth ran the VLN races with various teammates. With Seyffarth, Lance David Arnold and Nico Bastian the team won the OPEL 6-Stunden ADAC Ruhr-Pokal-Rennen. The team won the race again the following year with Jäger and Serffarth. A new driver pairing of Christian Hohenadel and Maro Engel won the ROWE sponsored DMV 250-Meilen-Rennen in 2014 Renger van der Zande joined Engel and Seyffarth for the openingsrace of the VLN series. The race was cut short after a heavy crash by Jann Mardenborough in the GT Academy Nissan GT-R Nismo in which one spectator was killed. ROWE Racing was in the lead when the race was red flagged. Hohenadel and Klaus Graf scored the second season victory for the team at the 38th RCM DMV Grenzlandrennen In 2015 the team also ran one round of the ADAC GT Masters series. Stef Dusseldorp and Nico Bastian represented the team at the Nürburgring finishing eleventh in race one and thirteenth in race two.

ROWE Racing first entered the Blancpain Endurance Series in 2015. The teams best finish was a fourth place at the 1000km Paul Ricard. At the prestigious 24 Hours of Spa the team (with Daniel Juncadella, Nico Bastian and Stef Dusseldorp) was in the lead at the 6 hour and 12 hour marks, scoring valuable points for the championship. A problem on the alternator caused the team to retire with less than sixty minutes to go.

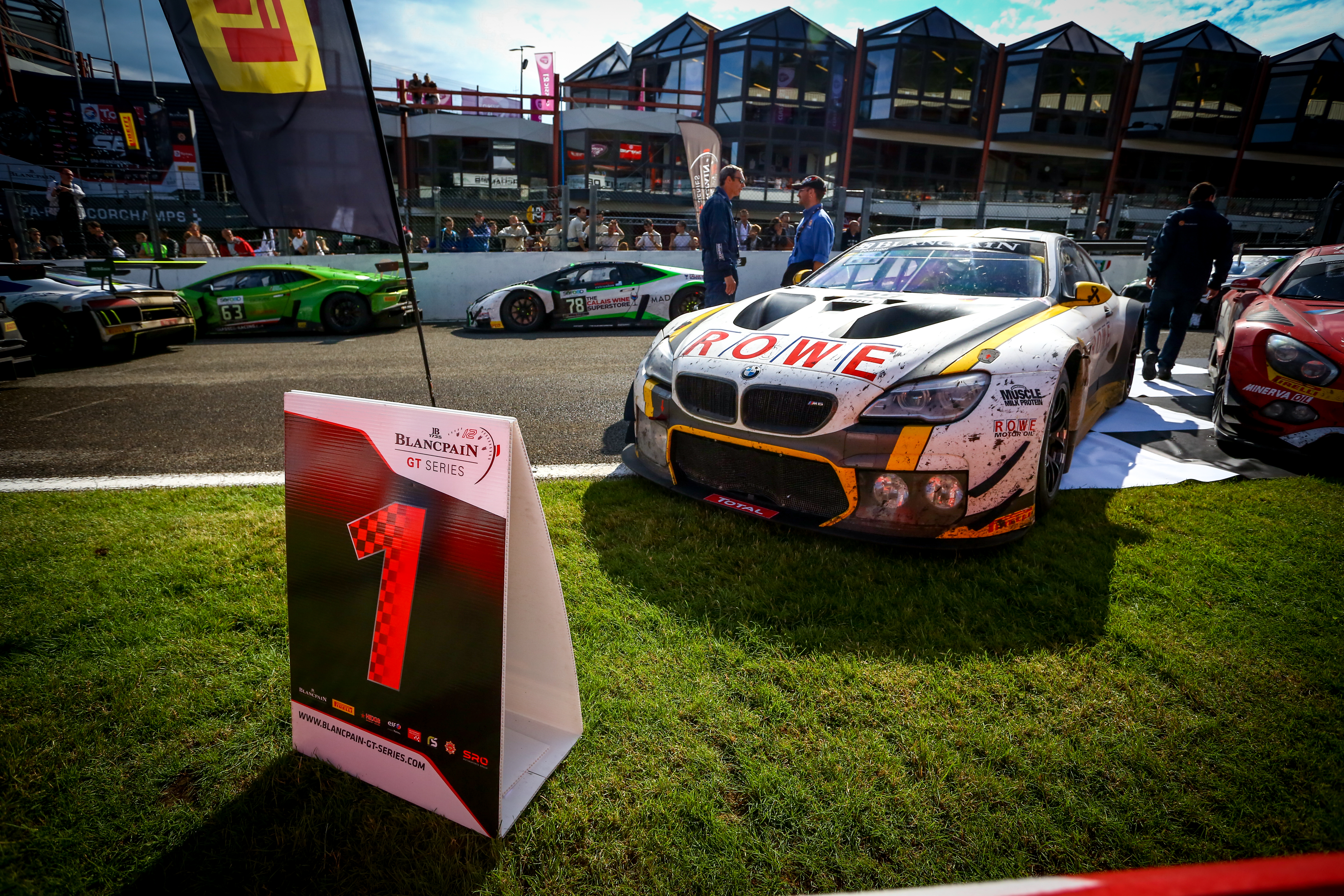
The Rowe Racing BMW M6 GT3 at the Spa 24 Hours.

=== BMW Motorsport factory team ===
Starting in 2016 the team received factory support by BMW Motorsport. The team entered two BMW F13 M6 GT3 cars in the Blancpain Endurance Series and Sprint Cup. After a fourth place at Silverstone the team picked up its first Blancpain Endurance Series win at the prestigious 24 Hours of Spa. In 2020 it won both the Nürburgring 24 Hours and the Spa 24 Hours.

The team participated in the 2021 Deutsche Tourenwagen Masters by fielding two BMW M6 GT3 cars full-time. The cars were driven by BMW factory drivers Timo Glock and Sheldon van der Linde, with the latter scoring the team's best result of the season by finishing in fourth place on one occasion. On 15 February 2022, the team announced that it would not return to the series in 2022 and instead use the new BMW M4 GT3 cars for endurance racing. In 2023 it won the Spa 24 Hours for the third time.

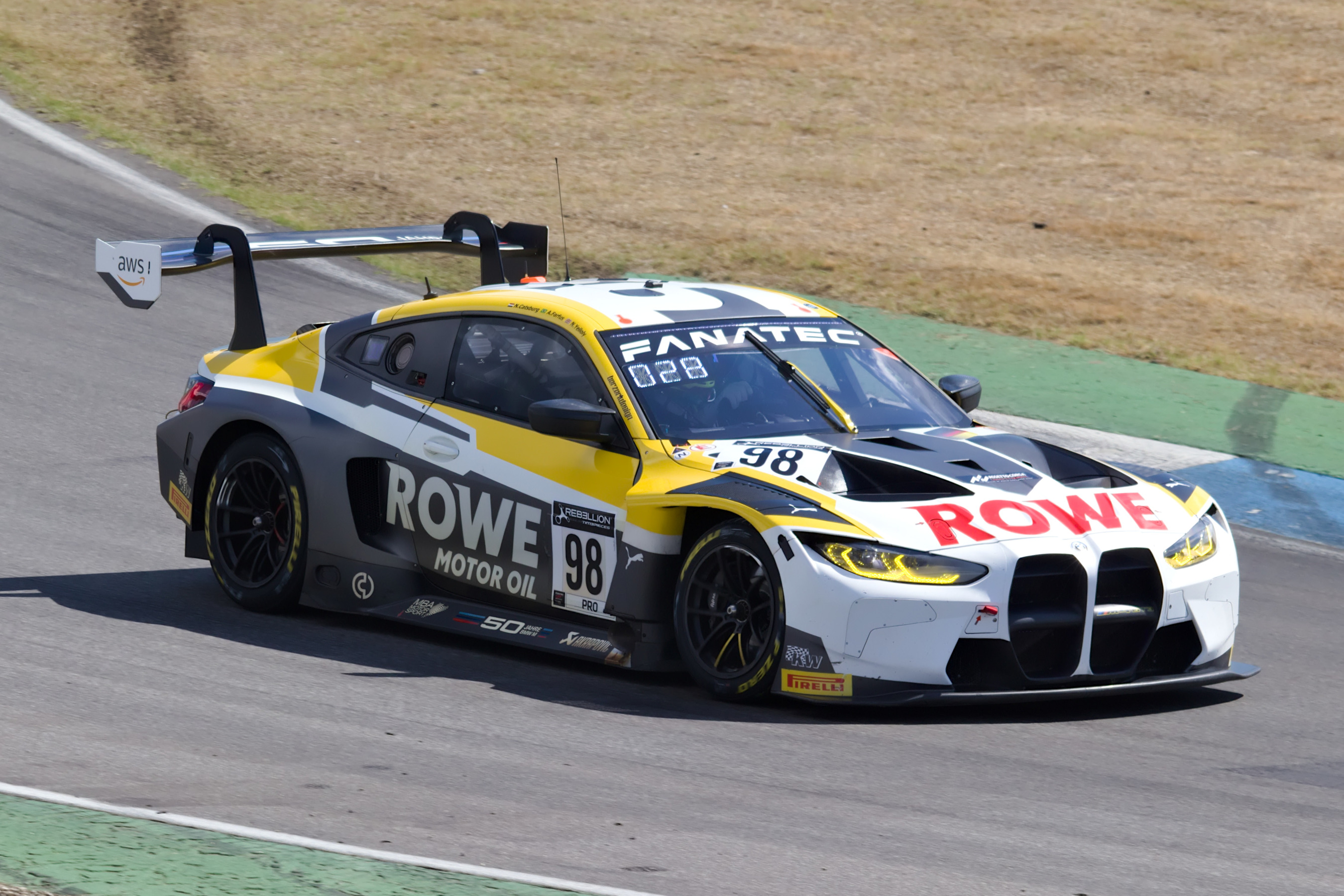
Since 2022 ROWE Racing runs the BMW M4 GT3.

=== Timeline ===
2000s	2010s										2020s
09	10	11	12	13	14	15	16	17	18	19	20	21	22	23	24	25	26
VLN											NLS
	24 Hours of Nürburgring
						Blancpain Endurance Series (2015); Blancpain GT Series Endurance Cup (2016-2019); GT World Challenge Europe Endurance Cup (2020-)
						ADAC GT Masters
							Blancpain GT Series Sprint Cup
												DTM

== Competition Vehicles ==
ROWE Racing competed with up to four Mercedes-Benz SLS AMG GT3 until 2016. The team ran the BMW M6 GT3 from 2016 till 2021. Since 2022 it runs the BMW M4 GT3.

== Results ==
=== Deutsche Tourenwagen Masters ===
Year	Car	Drivers	Races	Wins	Poles	F/Laps	Podiums	Points	D.C.	T.C.
2021	BMW M6 GT3	(South Africa) Sheldon van der Linde	16	0	1	1	0	55	11th	7th
2021	BMW M6 GT3	(Germany) Timo Glock	16	0	0	0	0	9	17th	7th

=== Complete 24 Hours of Nürburgring results ===
(key) (Races in bold indicate pole position) (Races in italics indicate fastest lap)

24 Hours of Nürburgring
Year	Team	Car	Car No.	Drivers	Class	Laps	Pos.	Class Pos.
2010	Team ROWE Motorsport	Porsche 911 GT3 Cup S	18	(Germany) Michael Zehe (Germany) Marco Schelp (Germany) Alexander Roloff (United States) Mark Bullitt	SP9 GT3	150	8th	5th
2010	Team ROWE Motorsport	Audi TT	147	(Germany) Franz Rohr (Germany) Uwe Bleck (Germany) Andreas Kast (Germany) Michael Zehe	SP3T	61	DNF	DNF
2011	Mamerow/ROWE Racing	Mercedes-Benz SLS AMG GT3	30	(Germany) Christian Mamerow (Germany) Armin Hahne (Germany) Pierre Kaffer	SP9 GT3	49	DNF	DNF
2011	ROWE Racing	Mercedes-Benz SLS AMG GT3	36	(Germany) Alexander Roloff (Germany) Roland Rehfeld (Germany) Hubert Haupt (Germany) Marco Schelp	SP9 GT3	58	DNF	DNF
2011	ROWE Racing	Mercedes-Benz SLS AMG GT3	46	(Germany) Michael Zehe (Germany) Dominik Schwager (Germany) Klaus Rader (United States) Mark Bullitt	SP9 GT3	145	17th	12th
2012	ROWE Racing	Mercedes-Benz SLS AMG GT3	21	(Germany) Michael Zehe (Germany) Marko Hartung (Germany) Roland Rehfeld (United States) Mark Bullitt	SP9 GT3	150	10th	10th
2012	ROWE Racing	Mercedes-Benz SLS AMG GT3	22	(Germany) Klaus Graf (Germany) Thomas Jäger (Germany) Alexander Roloff (Germany) Jan Seyffarth	SP9 GT3	120	DNF	DNF
2013	ROWE Racing	Mercedes-Benz SLS AMG GT3	21	(Germany) Marko Hartung (Germany) Kenneth Heyer (Germany) Roland Rehfeld (Germany) Christian Hohenadel	SP9 GT3	34	DNF	DNF
2013	ROWE Racing	Mercedes-Benz SLS AMG GT3	22	(Germany) Klaus Graf (Germany) Nico Bastian (Germany) Jan Seyffarth (Germany) Thomas Jäger	SP9 GT3	87	**3rd**	**3rd**
2013	ROWE Racing	Mercedes-Benz SLS AMG GT3	23	(Germany) Lance David Arnold (Germany) Alexander Roloff (Germany) Jan Seyffarth (Germany) Thomas Jäger	SP9 GT3	87	4th	4th
2014	ROWE Racing	Mercedes-Benz SLS AMG GT3	22	(Germany) Michael Zehe (Germany) Nico Bastian (Germany) Maro Engel (Germany) Christian Hohenadel	SP9 GT3	157	**3rd**	**3rd**
2014	ROWE Racing	Mercedes-Benz SLS AMG GT3	23	(Germany) Klaus Graf (Germany) Jan Seyffarth (Germany) Thomas Jäger (Sweden) Richard Göransson	SP9 GT3	147	DNF	DNF
2015	ROWE Racing	Mercedes-Benz SLS AMG GT3	22	(Germany) Jan Seyffarth (Germany) Thomas Jäger (Germany) Maro Engel (Netherlands) Renger van der Zande	SP9 GT3	61	DNF	DNF
2015	ROWE Racing	Mercedes-Benz SLS AMG GT3	23	(Germany) Klaus Graf (Germany) Christian Hohenadel (Germany) Thomas Jäger (Germany) Nico Bastian	SP9 GT3	145	DNF	DNF
2016	ROWE Racing	BMW M6 GT3	22	(Germany) Klaus Graf (United Kingdom) Richard Westbrook (Finland) Markus Palttala (Netherlands) Nicky Catsburg	SP9 GT3	57	DNF	DNF
2016	ROWE Racing	BMW M6 GT3	23	(United Kingdom) Alexander Sims (Austria) Philipp Eng (Germany) Dirk Werner (Belgium) Maxime Martin	SP9 GT3	133	5th	5th
2017	ROWE Racing	BMW M6 GT3	98	(Finland) Markus Palttala (United Kingdom) Richard Westbrook (United Kingdom) Alexander Sims (Netherlands) Nicky Catsburg	SP9	158	**2nd**	**2nd**
2017	ROWE Racing	BMW M6 GT3	99	(Germany) Marc Basseng (Austria) Philipp Eng (Belgium) Maxime Martin	SP9	157	10th	10th
2018	ROWE Racing	BMW M6 GT3	98	(United States) John Edwards (United Kingdom) Richard Westbrook (United Kingdom) Tom Blomqvist (Netherlands) Nicky Catsburg	SP9	82	DNF	DNF
2018	ROWE Racing	BMW M6 GT3	99	(United Kingdom) Alexander Sims (Finland) Jesse Krohn (United States) Connor De Phillippi (Germany) Martin Tomczyk	SP9	16	DNF	DNF
2019	ROWE Racing	BMW M6 GT3	98	(United States) Connor De Phillippi (Austria) Philipp Eng (United Kingdom) Tom Blomqvist (Denmark) Mikkel Jensen	SP9	22	DNF	DNF
2019	ROWE Racing	BMW M6 GT3	99	(Netherlands) Nicky Catsburg (Germany) Marco Wittmann (Finland) Jesse Krohn (United States) John Edwards	SP9	8	DNF	DNF
2020	ROWE Racing	BMW M6 GT3	98	(United Kingdom) Tom Blomqvist (Austria) Philipp Eng (Germany) Marco Wittmann	SP9	85	4th	4th
2020	ROWE Racing	BMW M6 GT3	99	(Netherlands) Nicky Catsburg (United Kingdom) Alexander Sims (United Kingdom) Nick Yelloly	SP9	85	**1st**	**1st**
2021	ROWE Racing	BMW M6 GT3	1	(Netherlands) Nicky Catsburg (United States) John Edwards (Austria) Philipp Eng (United Kingdom) Nick Yelloly	SP9	42	DNF	DNF
2021	ROWE Racing	BMW M6 GT3	98	(United States) Connor De Phillippi (South Africa) Sheldon van der Linde (Germany) Martin Tomczyk (Germany) Marco Wittmann	SP9	59	**2nd**	**2nd**
2022	ROWE Racing	BMW M4 GT3	98	(Netherlands) Nicky Catsburg (United States) John Edwards (South Africa) Sheldon van der Linde (Germany) Marco Wittmann	SP9 Pro	47	DNF	DNF
2022	ROWE Racing	BMW M4 GT3	99	(Austria) Philipp Eng (Brazil) Augusto Farfus (United States) Connor De Phillippi (United Kingdom) Nick Yelloly	SP9 Pro	18	DNF	DNF
2023	ROWE Racing	BMW M4 GT3	98	(South Africa) Sheldon van der Linde (Belgium) Maxime Martin (Belgium) Dries Vanthoor (Germany) Marco Wittmann	SP9 Pro	162	**2nd**	**2nd**
2023	ROWE Racing	BMW M4 GT3	99	(Austria) Philipp Eng (Brazil) Augusto Farfus (United States) Connor De Phillippi (United Kingdom) Nick Yelloly	SP9 Pro	83	DNF	DNF
2024	ROWE Racing	BMW M4 GT3	98	(Brazil) Augusto Farfus (Switzerland) Raffaele Marciello (Belgium) Maxime Martin (Germany) Marco Wittmann	SP9 Pro	50	7th	7th
2024	ROWE Racing	BMW M4 GT3	99	(Brazil) Augusto Farfus (Netherlands) Robin Frijns (South Africa) Sheldon van der Linde (Belgium) Dries Vanthoor	SP9 Pro	21	DNF	DNF
2025	ROWE Racing	BMW M4 GT3 Evo	98	(Brazil) Augusto Farfus (Finland) Jesse Krohn (Switzerland) Raffaele Marciello (South Africa) Kelvin van der Linde	SP9 Pro	141	**1st**	**1st**
2026	ROWE Racing	BMW M4 GT3 Evo	1	(Brazil) Augusto Farfus (Switzerland) Raffaele Marciello (South Africa) Jordan Pepper (South Africa) Kelvin van der Linde	SP9 Pro	49	DNF	DNF
2026	ROWE Racing	BMW M4 GT3 Evo	99	(United Kingdom) Dan Harper (Germany) Max Hesse (South Africa) Sheldon van der Linde (Belgium) Dries Vanthoor	SP9 Pro	156	3rd	3rd

=== Complete GT World Challenge Europe Endurance Cup results ===
(key) (Races in bold indicate pole position) (Races in italics indicate fastest lap)

Blancpain Endurance Series (2015)
Year	Car	No.	Drivers	1	2	3	4	5	Pos.	Pts
2015	Mercedes-Benz SLS AMG GT3	98	(Denmark) Nicolai Sylvest (Netherlands) Indy Dontje 1–3 (Spain) Daniel Juncadella 1–2 (Germany) Thomas Jäger 3 (Germany) Kenneth Heyer 5 (Spain) Miguel Toril 5	(Italy); MNZ; 15	(United Kingdom); SIL; 11	(France); LEC; Ret	(Belgium); SPA	(Germany); NÜR; 15	12th	45
2015	Mercedes-Benz SLS AMG GT3	99	(Germany) Nico Bastian (Netherlands) Stef Dusseldorp (Germany) Klaus Graf 1–2 (Spain) Daniel Juncadella 3–5	(Italy); MNZ; 11	(United Kingdom); SIL; 10	(France); LEC; 4	(Belgium); SPA; 16	(Germany); NÜR; 19	12th	45
Blancpain GT Series Endurance Cup (2016–2019)
2016	BMW M6 GT3	98	(Netherlands) Stef Dusseldorp 1–2, 4–5 (Germany) Lucas Luhr 1, 3 (Germany) Jens Klingmann 2–3 (Netherlands) Nicky Catsburg 2, 4 (Germany) Dirk Werner 3–4 (United Kingdom) Tom Blomqvist 5 (Germany) Martin Tomczyk 5	(Italy); MNZ; Ret	(United Kingdom); SIL; 12	(France); LEC; Ret	(Belgium); SPA; 41	(Germany); NÜR; 15	5th	60
2016	BMW M6 GT3	99	(Austria) Philipp Eng (United Kingdom) Alexander Sims (Germany) Dirk Werner 1 (Belgium) Maxime Martin 2, 4 (Netherlands) Stef Dusseldorp 3 (Netherlands) Nicky Catsburg 5	(Italy); MNZ; Ret	(United Kingdom); SIL; 4	(France); LEC; Ret	(Belgium); SPA; 1	(Germany); NÜR; 10	5th	60
2017	BMW M6 GT3	98	(Canada) Bruno Spengler (Finland) Markus Palttala 2–3, 5 (Finland) Jesse Krohn 2 (United Kingdom) Tom Blomqvist 3–5 (Netherlands) Nicky Catsburg 4	(Italy); MNZ	(United Kingdom); SIL; 41	(France); LEC; Ret	(Belgium); SPA; 10	(Spain); CAT; Ret	10th	21
2017	BMW M6 GT3	99	(Austria) Philipp Eng (Belgium) Maxime Martin (United Kingdom) Alexander Sims	(Italy); MNZ	(United Kingdom); SIL; 7	(France); LEC; Ret	(Belgium); SPA; 33	(Spain); CAT; 12	10th	21
2018	BMW M6 GT3	98	(United Kingdom) Ricky Collard 1–4 (Finland) Jesse Krohn 1, 3–4 (Germany) Jens Klingmann 1, 5 (United Kingdom) Nick Yelloly 2–3 (United States) John Edwards 2 (Germany) Marco Wittmann 4 (United Kingdom) Tom Blomqvist 5 (Netherlands) Nicky Catsburg 5	(Italy); MNZ; Ret	(United Kingdom); SIL; Ret	(France); LEC; Ret	(Belgium); SPA; Ret	(Spain); CAT; 9	8th	41
2018	BMW M6 GT3	99	(United Kingdom) Alexander Sims 1, 4–5 (Netherlands) Nicky Catsburg 1, 4 (Germany) Marco Wittmann 1 (Germany) Jens Klingmann 2–4 (Finland) Jesse Krohn 2, 5 (United States) Connor De Phillippi 2 (United Kingdom) Tom Blomqvist 3 (Australia) Chaz Mostert 3 (Austria) Philipp Eng 5	(Italy); MNZ; Ret	(United Kingdom); SIL; 13	(France); LEC; 11	(Belgium); SPA; 2	(Spain); CAT; 8	8th	41
2019	Porsche 911 GT3 R	98	(France) Romain Dumas (France) Mathieu Jaminet (Germany) Sven Müller	(Italy); MNZ; 21	(United Kingdom); SIL; 4	(France); LEC; Ret	(Belgium); SPA; 5	(Spain); **CAT**; 6	3rd	65
2019	Porsche 911 GT3 R	99	(Austria) Matt Campbell (Norway) Dennis Olsen (Germany) Dirk Werner	(Italy); MNZ; 8	(United Kingdom); SIL; 19	(France); LEC; 5	(Belgium); SPA; 7	(Spain); CAT; Ret	3rd	65
2019	Porsche 911 GT3 R	998	(France) Frédéric Makowiecki (France) Patrick Pilet (United Kingdom) Nick Tandy	(Italy); MNZ	(United Kingdom); SIL	(France); LEC	(Belgium); SPA; 2	(Spain); CAT	3rd	65
GT World Challenge Europe Endurance Cup (2020–)
2020	Porsche 911 GT3 R	98	(Germany) Timo Bernhard 2 (Netherlands) Jeroen Bleekemolen 2 (Switzerland) Simona de Silvestro 2 (New Zealand) Earl Bamber 3 (United Kingdom) Nick Tandy 3 (Belgium) Laurens Vanthoor 3	(Italy); MNZ	(Germany); NÜR; 8‡	(Belgium); SPA; 1	(France); LEC		6th	45
2020	Porsche 911 GT3 R	99	(France) Julien Andlauer (Austria) Klaus Bachler (Germany) Dirk Werner	(Italy); MNZ; 6	(Germany); NÜR; WD	(Belgium); SPA; 32	(France); LEC		6th	45
2022	BMW M4 GT3	50	(United Kingdom) Dan Harper (Germany) Max Hesse (United States) Neil Verhagen	(Italy); IMO; 15	(France); LEC; 4	(Belgium); SPA; 5	(Germany); HOC; 9	(Spain); CAT; 13	4th	66
2022	BMW M4 GT3	98	(Brazil) Augusto Farfus (United Kingdom) Nick Yelloly (Netherlands) Nicky Catsburg 1–4 (Austria) Philipp Eng 5	(Italy); IMO; 11	(France); LEC; 11	(Belgium); SPA; 6	(Germany); HOC; 11	(Spain); CAT; 9	4th	66
2023	BMW M4 GT3	98	(Austria) Philipp Eng (Germany) Marco Wittmann (United Kingdom) Nick Yelloly	(Italy); **MNZ**; 1	(France); LEC; 3	(Belgium); SPA; 1	(Germany); NÜR; 15	(Spain); CAT; 10	2nd	85
2023	BMW M4 GT3	998	(United Kingdom) Dan Harper (Germany) Max Hesse (United States) Neil Verhagen	(Italy); MNZ; 2	(France); LEC; 6	(Belgium); SPA; 4	(Germany); NÜR; 11	(Spain); CAT; 12	2nd	85
2024	BMW M4 GT3	98	(Germany) Marco Wittmann (Austria) Philipp Eng 1–3 (United Kingdom) Nick Yelloly 1–3 (Netherlands) Robin Frijns 4 (Netherlands) Maxime Oosten 4	(France); LEC; 12	(Belgium); SPA; Ret	(Germany); NÜR; 5	(Italy); MNZ; WD	(Saudi Arabia); JED	7th	47
2024	BMW M4 GT3	998	(Brazil) Augusto Farfus (United Kingdom) Dan Harper (Germany) Max Hesse	(France); LEC; 1	(Belgium); SPA; 6	(Germany); NÜR; 11	(Italy); MNZ; 27	(Saudi Arabia); JED; Ret	7th	47
2025	BMW M4 GT3 Evo	98	(Brazil) Augusto Farfus (Finland) Jesse Krohn (Switzerland) Raffaele Marciello	(France); LEC; 7	(Italy); MNZ; Ret	(Belgium); SPA; 5	(Germany); NÜR; 1	(Spain); CAT; 3	7th	64
2025	BMW M4 GT3 Evo	998	(Austria) Philipp Eng (United Kingdom) Dan Harper (Germany) Max Hesse	(France); LEC	(Italy); MNZ	(Belgium); SPA; 29	(Germany); NÜR	(Spain); CAT	7th	64
2026	BMW M4 GT3 Evo	98	(United Kingdom) Jake Dennis (Brazil) Augusto Farfus (Switzerland) Raffaele Marciello	(France); LEC	(Italy); MNZ	(Belgium); SPA	(Germany); NÜR	(Portugal); ALG		
2026	BMW M4 GT3 Evo	998	(Belgium) Ugo de Wilde (Germany) Jens Klingmann (Germany) Tim Tramnitz	(France); LEC	(Italy); MNZ	(Belgium); SPA	(Germany); NÜR	(Portugal); ALG		

‡Guest entry, ineligible to score points
