= 2017 24 Hours of Spa =

Layout of the Circuit de Spa-Francorchamps

The 2017 Total Spa 24 Hours was the 70th running of the Spa 24 Hours. It was also the fourth round of the 2017 Blancpain GT Series Endurance Cup and was held on 29 and 30 July at the Circuit de Spa-Francorchamps, Belgium.

The race was won by Audi Sport Team Saintéloc and drivers Christopher Haase, Jules Gounon and Markus Winkelhock.

== Race result ==
Pos	Class	No	Team	Drivers	Car	Laps
1	Pro Cup	25	(France) Audi Sport Team Saintéloc	(Germany) Christopher Haase (France) Jules Gounon (Germany) Markus Winkelhock	Audi R8 LMS	546
2	Pro Cup	8	(United Kingdom) Bentley Team M-Sport	(Belgium) Maxime Soulet (Monaco) Vincent Abril (Spain) Andy Soucek	Bentley Continental GT3	546
3	Pro Cup	90	(France) AKKA ASP Team	(Italy) Edoardo Mortara (United Kingdom) Michael Meadows (Italy) Raffaele Marciello	Mercedes-AMG GT3	546
4	Pro Cup	117	(Germany) KÜS Team75 Bernhard	(France) Kévin Estre (Denmark) Michael Christensen (Belgium) Laurens Vanthoor	Porsche 911 GT3 R (991)	546
5	Pro Cup	2	(Belgium) Belgian Audi Club Team WRT	(United States) Connor De Phillippi (Germany) Christopher Mies (Belgium) Frédéric Vervisch	Audi R8 LMS	546
6	Pro Cup	1	(Belgium) Belgian Audi Club Team WRT	(Spain) Antonio Garcia (Switzerland) Nico Müller (Germany) René Rast	Audi R8 LMS	546
7	Pro Cup	85	(Germany) HTP Motorsport	(Sweden) Edward Sandström (Germany) Fabian Schiller (Austria) Dominik Baumann	Mercedes-AMG GT3	545
8	Pro Cup	4	(Germany) Mercedes-AMG Team Black Falcon	(Germany) Luca Stolz (United Kingdom) Adam Christodoulou (Netherlands) Yelmer Buurman	Mercedes-AMG GT3	545
9	Pro Cup	76	(Czech Republic) Audi Sport Team ISR	(Germany) Pierre Kaffer (Germany) Frank Stippler (South Africa) Kelvin van der Linde	Audi R8 LMS	543
10	Pro Cup	98	(Germany) ROWE Racing	(United Kingdom) Tom Blomqvist (Netherlands) Nick Catsburg (Canada) Bruno Spengler	BMW M6 GT3	542
11	Pro Cup	5	(Belgium) Belgian Audi Club Team WRT	(Switzerland) Marcel Fässler (Germany) André Lotterer (Belgium) Dries Vanthoor	Audi R8 LMS	541
12	Pro-AM Cup	16	(Germany) Mercedes-AMG Team Black Falcon	(United Kingdom) Oliver Morley (Spain) Miguel Toril (Germany) Marvin Kirchhöfer (Germany) Maximilian Götz	Mercedes-AMG GT3	540
13	Pro Cup	23	(United Kingdom) Motul Team RJN Nissan	(Spain) Lucas Ordóñez (United Kingdom) Alex Buncombe (Japan) Katsumasa Chiyo	Nissan GT-R NISMO GT3	539
14	Pro Cup	7	(United Kingdom) Bentley Team M-Sport	(United Kingdom) Guy Smith (United Kingdom) Oliver Jarvis (United Kingdom) Steven Kane	Bentley Continental GT3	539
15	Pro-AM Cup	97	(United Kingdom) Oman Racing Team with TF Sport	(Oman) Ahmad Al Harthy (Turkey) Salih Yoluç (United Kingdom) Jonny Adam (United Kingdom) Euan Hankey	Aston Martin V12 Vantage GT3	539
16	Pro Cup	12	(Italy) Ombra Racing	(Italy) Michele Beretta (Italy) Stefano Gattuso (Italy) Andrea Piccini	Lamborghini Huracán GT3	538
17	Pro-AM Cup	961	(Italy) AF Corse	(Lebanon) Alex Demerdjian (France) Nicolas Minassian (Italy) Davide Rizzo (Finland) Toni Vilander	Ferrari 488 GT3	538
18	Pro Cup	19	(Austria) GRT Grasser Racing Team	(Switzerland) Rolf Ineichen (Italy) Raffaele Giammaria (Argentina) Ezequiel Perez Companc	Lamborghini Huracán GT3	537
19	Pro-AM Cup	51	(Italy) AF Corse	(Japan) Ishikawa Motoaki (Italy) Lorenzo Bontempelli (Monaco) Olivier Beretta (Monaco) Francesco Castellacci	Ferrari 488 GT3	536
20	Pro-AM Cup	35	(Germany) Walkenhorst Motorsport	(Finland) Markus Palttala (Norway) Christian Krognes (Germany) Nico Menzel (Finland) Matias Henkola	BMW M6 GT3	536
21	Pro Cup	27	(Italy) Orange 1 Team Lazarus	(Italy) Luca Filippi (Germany) Nicolas Pohler (Italy) Fabrizio Crestani	Lamborghini Huracán GT3	534
22	AM Cup	888	(Switzerland) Kessel Racing	(Italy) Marco Zanuttini (Belgium) Jacques Duyver (South Africa) David Perel (Italy) Niki Cadei	Ferrari 488 GT3	532
23	Pro-AM Cup	52	(Italy) AF Corse	(United Kingdom) Duncan Cameron (Republic of Ireland) Matt Griffin (United Kingdom) Aaron Scott (Italy) Riccardo Ragazzi	Ferrari 488 GT3	531
24	Pro Cup	72	(Russia) SMP Racing	(Russia) Victor Shaytar (Italy) Davide Rigon (Spain) Miguel Molina	Ferrari 488 GT3	529
25	AM Cup	488	(Germany) Rinaldi Racing	(Germany) Pierre Ehret (Italy) Rino Mastronardi (Belgium) Patrick Van Glabeke (Italy) Gabriele Lancieri	Ferrari 488 GT3	528
26	AM Cup	36	(Germany) Walkenhorst Motorsport	(Germany) David Schiwietz (Belgium) Stef Van Campenhoudt (Germany) Henry Walkenhorst (Germany) Ralf Oeverhaus	BMW M6 GT3	527
27	AM Cup	26	(France) Saintéloc Racing	(Belgium) Christian Kelders (France) Marc Rostan (Belgium) Fred Bouvy	Audi R8 LMS	524
28	AM Cup	777	(Austria) Team HB Racing	(Belgium) Bernard Delhez (France) Gilles Vannelet (Germany) Mike Stursberg (Switzerland) Christopher Zanella	Lamborghini Huracán GT3	522
29	Pro-AM Cup	912	(Germany) Herberth Motorsport	(Switzerland) Daniel Allemann (Germany) Ralf Bohn (Germany) Sven Müller (France) Mathieu Jaminet	Porsche 911 GT3 R (991)	517
30	Pro Cup	22	(United Kingdom) Motul Team RJN Nissan	(Australia) Matt Simmons (United Kingdom) Struan Moore (United Kingdom) Matthew Parry	Nissan GT-R NISMO GT3	514
31	AM Cup	67	(Germany) Attempto Racing	(Italy) Giorgio Maggi (Germany) Jürgen Krebs (France) Clément Mateu (Belgium) Sarah Bovy	Lamborghini Huracán GT3	511
32	AM Cup	188	(United Kingdom) Garage 59	(Sweden) Alexander West (United Kingdom) Chris Goodwin (United Kingdom) Chris Harris (United Kingdom) Bradley Ellis	McLaren 650S GT3	501
33	Pro Cup	99	(Germany) ROWE Racing	(Austria) Philipp Eng (Belgium) Maxime Martin (United Kingdom) Alexander Sims	BMW M6 GT3	498
34	Group National	991	(Belgium) Speedlover	(Belgium) Pierre-Yves Paque (Belgium) Grégory Paisse (Belgium) Thierry de Latre du Bosqueau (Belgium) Louis-Philippe Soenen	Porsche 911 GT3 Cup (991 II)	476
35	Pro Cup	66	(Germany) Attempto Racing	(Canada) Mikael Grenier (Netherlands) Max Van Splunteren (Netherlands) Jaap Van Lagen	Lamborghini Huracán GT3	416
NC	Pro Cup	9	(Germany) Bentley Team ABT	(Germany) Christer Jöns (South Africa) Jordan Pepper (Belgium) Nico Verdonck	Bentley Continental GT3	379
NC	Pro Cup	63	(Austria) GRT Grasser Racing Team	(Italy) Mirko Bortolotti (Germany) Christian Engelhart (Germany) Andrea Caldarelli	Lamborghini Huracán GT3	356
NC	Pro Cup	55	(Italy) Kaspersky Motorsport	(Italy) Giancarlo Fisichella (Italy) Marco Cioci (United Kingdom) James Calado	Ferrari 488 GT3	299
NC	Pro-AM Cup	11	(Switzerland) Kessel Racing	(Poland) Michael Broniszewski (Italy) Andrea Rizzoli (Italy) Matteo Cressoni (Italy) Giacomo Piccini	Ferrari 488 GT3	288
NC	Pro-AM Cup	77	(United Kingdom) Barwell Motorsport	(Switzerland) Adrian Amstutz (Croatia) Martin Kodrić (Finland) Patrick Kujala (United Kingdom) Oliver Gavin	Lamborghini Huracán GT3	282
NC	Pro-AM Cup	53	(Switzerland) Spirit of Race	(Netherlands) Niek Hommerson (Belgium) Louis Machiels (Italy) Andrea Bertolini (Belgium) Rory Butcher	Ferrari 488 GT3	242
NC	Pro-AM Cup	3	(Belgium) Team WRT	(United Kingdom) Josh Caygill (Austria) Nikolaus Mayr-Melnhof (Australia) Jon Venter (United Kingdom) Richard Lyons	Audi R8 LMS	233
NC	Pro Cup	00	(Japan) GOOD SMILE Racing & TeamUKYO	(Japan) Nobuteru Taniguchi (Japan) Tatsuya Kataoka (Japan) Kamui Kobayashi	Mercedes-AMG GT3	230
NC	Pro Cup	43	(United Kingdom) Strakka Racing	(Italy) David Fumanelli (United Kingdom) Jonny Kane (United Kingdom) Sam Tordoff	McLaren 650S GT3	230
NC	Pro-AM Cup	18	(Germany) Team Black Falcon	(Saudi Arabia) Abdulaziz Bin Turki Al Faisal (Germany) Hubert Haupt (Italy) Gabriele Piana (Netherlands) Renger van der Zande	Mercedes-AMG GT3	228
NC	Pro Cup	88	(France) AKKA ASP Team	(Puerto Rico) Felix Serralles (Spain) Daniel Juncadella (France) Tristan Vautier	Mercedes-AMG GT3	209
NC	Pro-AM Cup	15	(Germany) Team Black Falcon	(United States) Dore Chaponik (United States) Brett Sandberg (United States) Scott Heckert (Netherlands) Jeroen Bleekemolen	Mercedes-AMG GT3	209
NC	Pro-AM Cup	42	(United Kingdom) Strakka Racing	(United Kingdom) Craig Fleming (United Kingdom) Nick Leventis (United Kingdom) Lewis Williamson (United Kingdom) Oliver Webb	McLaren 650S GT3	204
NC	Pro-AM Cup	78	(United Kingdom) Barwell Motorsport	(Russia) Leo Matchitski (Portugal) Miguel Ramos (United Kingdom) Richard Abra (United Kingdom) Phil Keen	Lamborghini Huracán GT3	198
NC	Pro-AM Cup	89	(France) AKKA ASP Team	(Switzerland) Daniele Perfetti (Switzerland) Alex Fontana (France) Ludovic Badey (Germany) Nico Bastian	Mercedes-AMG GT3	176
NC	Pro Cup	48	(Germany) MANN-FILTER Team HTP Motorsport	(Netherlands) Indy Dontje (Germany) Patrick Assenheimer (Germany) Kenneth Heyer	Mercedes-AMG GT3	152
NC	Pro Cup	84	(Germany) Mercedes-AMG Team HTP Motorsport	(Sweden) Jimmy Eriksson (Germany) Maxi Buhk (France) Franck Perera	Mercedes-AMG GT3	142
NC	Group National	56	(Belgium) RMS	(United States) Howard Blank (France) Yannick Mallegol (Monaco) Fabrice Notari (United States) Frank Mechaly	Porsche 911 GT3 Cup (991 II)	142
NC	Pro-AM Cup	911	(Germany) Herberth Motorsport	(Germany) Jürgen Häring (Germany) Alfred Renauer (Germany) Robert Renauer (Germany) Marc Lieb	Porsche 911 GT3 R (991)	139
NC	Pro Cup	14	(Switzerland) Emil Frey Jaguar Racing	(Switzerland) Lorenz Frey (Monaco) Stéphane Ortelli (Spain) Albert Costa	Emil Frey Jaguar G3	131
NC	Pro-AM Cup	333	(Germany) Rinaldi Racing	(Germany) Alexander Mattschull (Russia) Rinat Salikhov (Italy) Matteo Malucelli (Austria) Norbert Siedler	Ferrari 488 GT3	105
NC	Pro Cup	6	(Belgium) Team WRT	(Monaco) Stéphane Richelmi (France) Nathanaël Berthon (France) Benoît Tréluyer	Audi R8 LMS	103
NC	Pro Cup	59	(United Kingdom) Strakka Racing	(Malaysia) Jazeman Jaafar (Netherlands) Pieter Schothorst (United Kingdom) Andrew Watson	McLaren 650S GT3	96
NC	Pro Cup	75	(Czech Republic) Team ISR	(Portugal) Filipe Albuquerque (Austria) Clemens Schmid (Czech Republic) Filip Salaquarda	Audi R8 LMS	95
NC	Pro Cup	58	(United Kingdom) Strakka Racing	(United Kingdom) Ben Barnicoat (United Kingdom) Rob Bell (France) Côme Ledogar	McLaren 650S GT3	74
NC	Pro Cup	114	(Switzerland) Emil Frey Jaguar Racing	(Germany) Marco Seefried (Switzerland) Jonathan Hirschi (Austria) Christian Klien	Emil Frey Jaguar G3	69
NC	Pro Cup	17	(Belgium) Team WRT	(United Kingdom) Stuart Leonard (United Kingdom) Jake Dennis (United Kingdom) Jamie Green	Audi R8 LMS	53
NC	Pro Cup	50	(Italy) AF Corse	(Thailand) Pasin Lathouras (Italy) Michele Rugolo (Italy) Alessandro Pier Guidi	Ferrari 488 GT3	44
