= 2020 Indianapolis 8 Hours =

(United States) 2020 Indianapolis 8 Hours
Event Information
- Round 2 of 4 in the 2020 Intercontinental GT Challenge
- Date: 2–4 October 2020 Intercontinental GT Challenge
- Location: Speedway, Indiana, United States
- Venue: Indianapolis Motor Speedway

Results
Race 1
Distance	300 laps	1177.500 km
Pole position	(United States) Connor de Phillippi; Walkenhorst Motorsport	1:23.318
Winner	(United States) Connor de Phillippi (Netherlands) Nick Catsburg (Brazil) Augusto Farfus, Jr. Walkenhorst Motorsport	8:00:55.390

The 2020 Indianapolis 8 Hours was an endurance race held on 4 October 2020 at the Indianapolis Motor Speedway in Speedway, in Indiana, United States. The event was open to cars in GT classes, namely GT3 and GT4. It was the inaugural running of the Indianapolis 8 Hour, replacing the previous American leg of the Intercontinental GT Challenge, the California 8 Hours held at WeatherTech Raceway Laguna Seca. It was the second leg of the 2020 Intercontinental GT Challenge and the sixth and final round of the 2020 GT World Challenge America. The GT World Challenge America results would be determined by the race results after three hours instead of the full eight hours.

22 cars started the race, 12 GT3 entries and 10 GT4 entries. Just three of the entries had also raced in round 1 of the Intercontinental GT Challenge held in Australia in February.

The race was dominated by BMWs. The German Walkenhorst Motorsport team finished first and second after eight hours, led by the #34 BMW M6 of Dutch driver Nicky Catsburg, American driver Connor De Phillippi and Brazilian driver Augusto Farfus. BMW M4s also finished first and second in the GT4 class.

== Class structure ==
Cars competed in the following four classes.

- GT3 Overall
- GT3 Pro/Am
- GT3 Silver Cup
- GT4

== Entries ==
No.	Entrant	Car	Class	Driver 1	Driver 2	Driver 3
GT3 Entries
04	(United States) CrowdStrike/ DXDT Racing	Mercedes-AMG GT3 Evo	PA	(United States) Colin Braun	(United States) Ben Keating	(United States) George Kurtz
1	(Italy) Squadra Corse	Ferrari 488 GT3	PA	(Italy) Alessandro Balzan	(Mexico) Martin Fuentes	(United States) Mark Issa
6	(United States) Vital Speed Motorsport	Ferrari 488 GT3	OV	(United States) Trevor Baek	(Australia) Ryan Briscoe	(United States) Jeff Westphal
7	(United States) K-PAX Racing	Bentley Continental GT3	OV	(France) Jules Gounon	(South Africa) Jordan Pepper	(Belgium) Maxime Soulet
20	(United States) Wright Motorsports	Porsche 911 GT3 R	S	(Belgium) Jan Heylen	(United States) Fred Poordad	(United States) Max Root
30	(Japan) Team Honda Racing	Honda NSX GT3 Evo	OV	(United States) Dane Cameron	(Germany) Mario Farnbacher	(Netherlands) Renger van der Zande
31	(United States) Audi Sport Team Hardpoint	Audi R8 LMS Evo	OV	(Italy) Mirko Bortolotti	(United States) Spencer Pumpelly	(Germany) Markus Winkelhock
34	(Germany) Walkenhorst Motorsport	BMW M6 GT3	OV	(Netherlands) Nicky Catsburg	(United States) Connor De Phillippi	(Brazil) Augusto Farfus
35	(Germany) Walkenhorst Motorsport	BMW M6 GT3	OV	(United Kingdom) David Pittard	(Germany) Martin Tomczyk	(United Kingdom) Nicholas Yelloly
63	(United States) CrowdStrike/ DXDT Racing	Mercedes-AMG GT3 Evo	PA	(United States) David Askew	(United Kingdom) Ryan Dalziel	(United States) Richard Heistand
75	(Australia) SunEnergy1 Racing	Mercedes-AMG GT3 Evo	PA	(Canada) Mikaël Grenier	(Australia) Kenny Habul	(Austria) Martin Konrad
80	(United States) Racers Edge Motorsports	Acura NSX GT3 Evo	PA	(Lebanon) Ziad Ghandour	(Canada) Kyle Marcelli	TBA
93	(United States) Racers Edge Motorsports	Acura NSX GT3 Evo	OV	(United States) Shelby Blackstock	(United States) Trent Hindman	(United States) Robert Megennis
GT4 Entries
2	(United States) GMG Racing	Porsche 718 Cayman GT4 CS MR		(United States) Jason Bell	(United States) Andrew Davis	(United Kingdom) Robin Liddell
3	(United States) Motorsport USA	McLaren 570S GT4		(United States) Michael Cooper	(United States) Michael McAleenan	(United States) Dan Rogers
8	(United States) GMG Racing	Audi R8 LMS Evo		(United States) Andy Lee	(United States) Elias Sabo	(United States) James Sofronas
17	(United States) TRG - The Racers Group	Porsche 718 Cayman GT4 CS MR		(United States) Derek Deboer	(United States) Andy Lally	(United States) James Rappaport
25	(United States) CCR Team TFB	BMW M4 GT4		(United States) Tim Barber	(United States) Parker Chase	(United States) Cole Ciraulo
26	(United States) Classic BMW	BMW M4 GT4		(United States) Phil Bloom	(United States) Toby Grahovec	(United Kingdom) Stevan McAleer
33	(United States) Notlad Racing by RS1	Aston Martin Vantage AMR GT4		(United States) Joe Dalton	(United States) Patrick Gallagher	(United States) Jonathan Taylor
69	(United States) BGB Motorsports	Porsche 718 Cayman GT4 CS MR		(Canada) Tom Collingwood	(United States) Dylan Murry	(United States) John Tecce
82	(United States) BimmerWorld Racing	BMW M4 GT4		(United States) Bill Auberlen	(United States) James Clay	(United States) Chandler Hull
438	(United States) ST Racing	BMW M4 GT4		(United States) Jon Miller	(Canada) Samantha Tan	(Canada) Nickolas Wittmer

Icon	Class
OV	Overall
S	Silver Cup
PA	Pro/Am Cup

== Results ==
=== Top 10 shootout ===
Pos.	No.	Class	Driver	Team	Car	Time	Gap
1	34	Overall	(United States) Connor De Phillippi	(Germany) Walkenhorst Motorsport	BMW M6 GT3	1:23.318	
2	7	Overall	(France) Jules Gounon	(United States) K-Pax Racing	Bentley Continental GT3	1:23.560	+0.242
3	30	Overall	(Germany) Mario Farnbacher	(Japan) Team Honda Racing	Honda NSX GT3 Evo	1:23.821	+0.503
4	35	Overall	(United Kingdom) Nicholas Yelloly	(Germany) Walkenhorst Motorsport	BMW M6 GT3	1:23.858	+0.540
5	93	Overall	(United States) Trent Hindman	(United States) Racers Edge Motorsports	Acura NSX GT3 Evo	1:23.961	+0.643
6	1	Pro/Am	(Italy) Alessandro Balzan	(Italy) Squadra Corse	Ferrari 488 GT3	1:23.961	+0.643
7	31	Overall	(Italy) Mirko Bortolotti	(United States) Audi Sport Team Hardpoint	Audi R8 LMS Evo	1:24.073	+0.755
8	63	Pro/Am	(United Kingdom) Ryan Dalziel	(United States) DXDT Racing	Mercedes-AMG GT3	1:24.245	+0.927
9	20	Silver Cup	(United States) Max Root	(United States) Wright Motorsports	Porsche 911 GT3 R	1:24.268	+0.950
10	6	Overall	(United States) Jeff Westphal	(United States) Vital Speed	Ferrari 488 GT3	1:24.512	+1.194

=== Race ===
Pos.	Class	No.	Team / Entrant	Drivers	Car	Laps	Time/Retired
Pos.	Class	No.	Team / Entrant	Drivers	Engine	Laps	Time/Retired
1	Overall	34	(Germany) Walkenhorst Motorsport	(Netherlands) Nicky Catsburg (United States) Connor De Phillippi (Brazil) Augusto Farfus	BMW M6 GT3	300	8:00:55.390
1	Overall	34	(Germany) Walkenhorst Motorsport	(Netherlands) Nicky Catsburg (United States) Connor De Phillippi (Brazil) Augusto Farfus	4.4 L S63 BMW twin-turbo V8	300	8:00:55.390
2	Overall	35	(Germany) Walkenhorst Motorsport	(United Kingdom) David Pittard (Germany) Martin Tomczyk (United Kingdom) Nicholas Yelloly	BMW M6 GT3	300	+41.346
2	Overall	35	(Germany) Walkenhorst Motorsport	(United Kingdom) David Pittard (Germany) Martin Tomczyk (United Kingdom) Nicholas Yelloly	4.4 L S63 BMW twin-turbo V8	300	+41.346
3	Overall	30	(Japan) Team Honda Racing	(United States) Dane Cameron (Germany) Mario Farnbacher (Netherlands) Renger van der Zande	Honda NSX GT3 Evo	299	+1 lap
3	Overall	30	(Japan) Team Honda Racing	(United States) Dane Cameron (Germany) Mario Farnbacher (Netherlands) Renger van der Zande	3.5 L Honda JNC1 twin-turbocharged V6	299	+1 lap
4	Overall	31	(United States) Audi Sport Team Hardpoint	(Italy) Mirko Bortolotti (United States) Spencer Pumpelly (Germany) Markus Winkelhock	Audi R8 LMS Evo	297	+3 laps
4	Overall	31	(United States) Audi Sport Team Hardpoint	(Italy) Mirko Bortolotti (United States) Spencer Pumpelly (Germany) Markus Winkelhock	5.2 L FSI 2×DOHC Audi V10	297	+3 laps
5	Pro/Am	4	(United States) DXDT Racing	(United States) Colin Braun (United States) Ben Keating (United States) George Kurtz	Mercedes-AMG GT3	295	+5 laps
5	Pro/Am	4	(United States) DXDT Racing	(United States) Colin Braun (United States) Ben Keating (United States) George Kurtz	6.2 L Mercedes-Benz M159 V8	295	+5 laps
6	Silver Cup	20	(United States) Wright Motorsports	(Belgium) Jan Heylen (United States) Fred Poordad (United States) Max Root	Porsche 911 GT3 R	295	+5 laps
6	Silver Cup	20	(United States) Wright Motorsports	(Belgium) Jan Heylen (United States) Fred Poordad (United States) Max Root	4.0 L Porsche H6	295	+5 laps
7	Overall	93	(United States) Racers Edge Motorsports	(United States) Shelby Blackstock (United States) Trent Hindman (United States) Robert Megennis	Acura NSX GT3 Evo	293	+7 laps
7	Overall	93	(United States) Racers Edge Motorsports	(United States) Shelby Blackstock (United States) Trent Hindman (United States) Robert Megennis	3.5 L Honda JNC1 twin-turbocharged V6	293	+7 laps
8	Pro/Am	1	(Italy) Squadra Corse	(Italy) Alessandro Balzan (Mexico) Martin Fuentes (United States) Mark Issa	Ferrari 488 GT3	292	+8 laps
8	Pro/Am	1	(Italy) Squadra Corse	(Italy) Alessandro Balzan (Mexico) Martin Fuentes (United States) Mark Issa	3.9 L Ferrari F154 twin-turbo V8	292	+8 laps
9	Pro/AM	75	(Australia) SunEnergy 1 Racing	(Canada) Mikaël Grenier (Australia) Kenny Habul (Austria) Martin Konrad	Mercedes-AMG GT3	291	+9 laps
9	Pro/AM	75	(Australia) SunEnergy 1 Racing	(Canada) Mikaël Grenier (Australia) Kenny Habul (Austria) Martin Konrad	6.2 L Mercedes-Benz M159 V8	291	+9 laps
10	GT4	82	(United States) BimmerWorld Racing	(United States) Bill Auberlen (United States) James Clay (United States) Chandler Hull	BMW M4 GT4	273	+27 laps
10	GT4	82	(United States) BimmerWorld Racing	(United States) Bill Auberlen (United States) James Clay (United States) Chandler Hull	3.0 L BMW N55 twin-turbo I6	273	+27 laps
11	GT4	438	(United States) ST Racing	(United States) Jon Miller (Canada) Samantha Tan (Canada) Nickolas Wittmer	BMW M4 GT4	273	+27 laps
11	GT4	438	(United States) ST Racing	(United States) Jon Miller (Canada) Samantha Tan (Canada) Nickolas Wittmer	3.0 L BMW N55 twin-turbo I6	273	+27 laps
12	GT4	2	(United States) GMG Racing	(United States) Jason Bell (United States) Andrew Davis (United Kingdom) Robin Liddell	Porsche 718 Cayman GT4 CS MR	273	+27 laps
12	GT4	2	(United States) GMG Racing	(United States) Jason Bell (United States) Andrew Davis (United Kingdom) Robin Liddell	3.8 L Porsche H6	273	+27 laps
13	GT4	33	(United States) Notlad Racing by RS1	(United States) Joe Dalton (United States) Patrick Gallagher (United States) Jonathan Taylor	Aston Martin Vantage AMR GT4	272	+28 laps
13	GT4	33	(United States) Notlad Racing by RS1	(United States) Joe Dalton (United States) Patrick Gallagher (United States) Jonathan Taylor	4.0 L Mercedes-AMG M177 twin-turbocharged V8	272	+28 laps
14	GT4	17	(United States) TRG - The Racers Group	(United States) Derek Deboer (United States) Andy Lally (United States) James Rappaport	Porsche 718 Cayman GT4 CS MR	270	+30 laps
14	GT4	17	(United States) TRG - The Racers Group	(United States) Derek Deboer (United States) Andy Lally (United States) James Rappaport	3.8 L Porsche H6	270	+30 laps
15	GT4	8	(United States) GMG Racing	(United States) Andy Lee (United States) Elias Sabo (United States) James Sofronas	Audi R8 LMS Evo	297	+3 laps
15	GT4	8	(United States) GMG Racing	(United States) Andy Lee (United States) Elias Sabo (United States) James Sofronas	5.2 L FSI 2×DOHC Audi V10	297	+3 laps
16	GT4	69	(United States) BGB Motorsports	(Canada) Tom Collingwood (United States) Dylan Murry (United States) John Tecce	Porsche 718 Cayman GT4	263	+37 laps
16	GT4	69	(United States) BGB Motorsports	(Canada) Tom Collingwood (United States) Dylan Murry (United States) John Tecce	3.8 L Porsche H6	263	+37 laps
17	Overall	7	(United States) K-Pax Racing	(France) Jules Gounon (South Africa) Jordan Pepper (Belgium) Maxime Soulet	Bentley Continental GT3	260	+40 laps
17	Overall	7	(United States) K-Pax Racing	(France) Jules Gounon (South Africa) Jordan Pepper (Belgium) Maxime Soulet	4.0 L Volkswagen twin-turbo V8	260	+40 laps
18	GT4	26	(United States) Classic BMW	(United States) Phil Bloom (United States) Toby Grahovec (United Kingdom) Stevan McAleer	BMW M4 GT4	224	+76 laps
18	GT4	26	(United States) Classic BMW	(United States) Phil Bloom (United States) Toby Grahovec (United Kingdom) Stevan McAleer	3.0 L BMW N55 twin-turbo I6	224	+76 laps
19	GT4	25	(United States) CCR Team TFB	(United States) Tim Barber (United States) Parker Chase (United States) Cole Ciraulo	BMW M4 GT4	219	+81 laps
19	GT4	25	(United States) CCR Team TFB	(United States) Tim Barber (United States) Parker Chase (United States) Cole Ciraulo	3.0 L BMW N55 twin-turbo I6	219	+81 laps
DNF	Pro/Am	63	(United States) DXDT Racing	(United States) David Askew (United Kingdom) Ryan Dalziel (United States) Richard Heistand	Mercedes-AMG GT3	175	+125 laps
DNF	Pro/Am	63	(United States) DXDT Racing	(United States) David Askew (United Kingdom) Ryan Dalziel (United States) Richard Heistand	6.2 L Mercedes-Benz M159 V8	175	+125 laps
DNF	Overall	6	(United States) Vital Speed	(United States) Trevor Baek (Australia) Ryan Briscoe (United States) Jeff Westphal	Ferrari 488 GT3	98	+202 laps
DNF	Overall	6	(United States) Vital Speed	(United States) Trevor Baek (Australia) Ryan Briscoe (United States) Jeff Westphal	3.9 L Ferrari F154 twin-turbo V8	98	+202 laps
DNF	GT4	3	(United States) Motorsport USA	(United States) Michael Cooper (United States) Michael McAleenan (United States) Dan Rogers	McLaren 570S GT4	67	+233 laps
DNF	GT4	3	(United States) Motorsport USA	(United States) Michael Cooper (United States) Michael McAleenan (United States) Dan Rogers	3.8 L McLaren M838T E twin-turbocharged V8	67	+233 laps
DNS	Overall	80	(United States) Racers Edge Motorsports	(Lebanon) Ziad Ghandour (Canada) Kyle Marcelli	Honda NSX GT3 Evo	-	-
DNS	Overall	80	(United States) Racers Edge Motorsports	(Lebanon) Ziad Ghandour (Canada) Kyle Marcelli	3.5 L Honda JNC1 twin-turbocharged V6	-	-

- Race time of winning car: 8:00:55.390
- Race distance of cars on the lead lap: 1177.500 km
- Fastest race lap: 1:23.310 – Nicky Catsburg on lap 219

Intercontinental GT Challenge
Previous race: Bathurst 12 Hour	2020 season	Next race: 24 Hours of Spa
