= 2020 Kyalami 9 Hours =

(South Africa) 2020 Kyalami 9 Hours
Event Information
- Round 4 of 4 in the 2020 Intercontinental GT Challenge
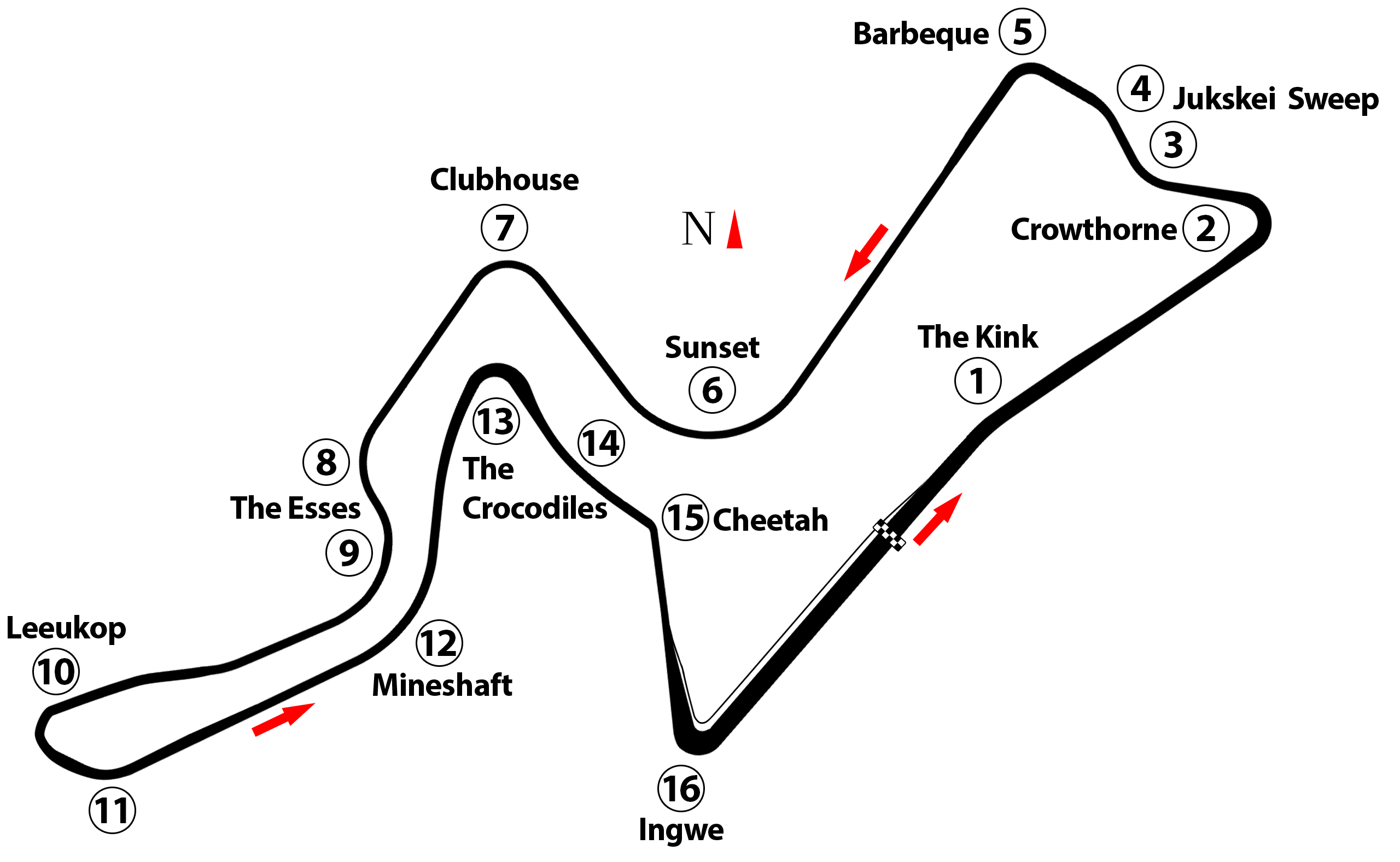
- Date: 10–12 December 2020 Intercontinental GT Challenge
- Location: Midrand, Gauteng, South Africa
- Venue: Kyalami Grand Prix Circuit

Results
Race 1
Distance	277 laps	1254,533 km
Pole position	(Germany) Mario Farnbacher; JAS Motorsport	1:42.521
Winner	(Brazil) Augusto Farfus, Jr. (Netherlands) Nick Catsburg (South Africa) Sheldon van der Linde; Walkenhorst Motorsport	9:00:30.467

The 2020 Kyalami 9 Hours was an endurance event that took place on 12 December 2020 at the Kyalami Grand Prix Circuit in Midrand, South Africa. The event was the fourth and final race of the 2020 Intercontinental GT Challenge, a season curtailed by the COVID-19 pandemic.

Honda team JAS Motorsport won pole position for the event and dominated the race by leading for eight hours until heavy rain shuffled the order with an hour remaining. The race finished under a Full Course Yellow period and was won by BMW team Walkenhorst Motorsport, driven by local driver Sheldon van der Linde alongside Augusto Farfus Jr. and Nick Catsburg. The result handed the latter two the drivers' title by five points over the third-placed trio of Matthew Campbell, Mathieu Jaminet and Patrick Pilet, while Porsche won the manufacturers' championship by 24 points over BMW.

== Results ==
=== Qualifying ===
Pos	Class	No	Team	Drivers	Car	Individual Times	Aggregate Time
1	P	30	(Italy) JAS Motorsport	(Belgium) Bertrand Baguette (Netherlands) Renger van der Zande (Germany) Mario Farnbacher	Honda NSX GT3	1:42.871; 1:42.715; 1:41.979	1:42.521
2	P	34	(Germany) Walkenhorst Motorsport	(Brazil) Augusto Farfus Jr. (Netherlands) Nick Catsburg (South Africa) Sheldon van der Linde	BMW M6 GT3	1:42.911; 1:42.909; 1:42.252	1:42.690
3	P	7	(United Kingdom) M-Sport	(Belgium) Maxime Soulet (France) Jules Gounon (South Africa) Jordan Pepper	Bentley Continental GT3	1:43.429; 1:42.610; 1:42.391	1:42.810
4	P	12	(United Arab Emirates) GPX Racing	(Australia) Matthew Campbell (France) Patrick Pilet (France) Mathieu Jaminet	Porsche 911 GT3 R	1:42.804; 1:43.090; 1:42.635	1:42.843
5	P	44	(Germany) Car Collection Motorsport	(Italy) Mattia Drudi (Switzerland) Patric Niederhauser (Germany) Christopher Haase	Audi R8 LMS Evo	1:43.224; 1:42.803; 1:42.609	1:42.878
6	P	35	(Germany) Walkenhorst Motorsport	(Germany) Martin Tomczyk (United Kingdom) David Pittard (United Kingdom) Nick Yelloly	BMW M6 GT3	1:42.775; 1:43.151; 1:42.898	1:42.941
7	P	32	(Belgium) Team WRT	(Belgium) Frédéric Vervisch (Italy) Mirko Bortolotti (Belgium) Charles Weerts	Audi R8 LMS Evo	1:43.090; 1:43.055; 1:42.756	1:42.967
8	P	31	(Belgium) Team WRT	(Belgium) Dries Vanthoor (Germany) Markus Winkelhock (South Africa) Kelvin van der Linde	Audi R8 LMS Evo	1:42.977; 1:43.431; 1:42.527	1:42.978
9	P	8	(United Kingdom) M-Sport	(United Kingdom) Alex Buncombe (United Kingdom) Oliver Jarvis (United Kingdom) Sebastian Morris	Bentley Continental GT3	1:43.378; 1:42.951; 1:42.887	1:43.072
10	P	54	(Italy) Dinamic Motorsport	(France) Kévin Estre (New Zealand) Earl Bamber (Belgium) Laurens Vanthoor	Porsche 911 GT3 R	1:43.533; 1:42.979; 1:42.941	1:43.151
11	PA	9	(Austria) Lechner Racing	(South Africa) Saul Hack (South Africa) André Bezuidenhout (Luxembourg) Dylan Pereira	Porsche 911 GT3 R	1:43.508; 1:48.155; 1:43.220	1:44.961
12	S	45	(Germany) Car Collection Motorsport	(Germany) Dennis Marschall (Austria) Martin Lechmann (Netherlands) Milan Dontje	Audi R8 LMS Evo	1:43.308; 1:47.365; 1:44.359	1:45.010

=== Top 6 Shootout ===
Pos.	No.	Team	Driver	Car	Time	Gap
1	30	(Italy) JAS Motorsport	(Germany) Mario Farnbacher	Honda NSX GT3	1:41.581	
2	7	(United Kingdom) M-Sport	(South Africa) Jordan Pepper	Bentley Continental GT3	1:41.723	+0.142
3	34	(Germany) Walkenhorst Motorsport	(South Africa) Sheldon van der Linde	BMW M6 GT3	1:41.891	+0.310
4	44	(Germany) Car Collection Motorsport	(Germany) Christopher Haase	Audi R8 LMS Evo	1:42.234	+0.653
5	12	(United Arab Emirates) GPX Racing	(Australia) Matthew Campbell	Porsche 911 GT3 R	1:42.274	+0.693
6	35	(Germany) Walkenhorst Motorsport	(United Kingdom) David Pittard	BMW M6 GT3	1:42.564	+0.983

=== Race ===
Pos	Class	No	Team	Drivers	Car	Laps	Time/Reason
1	P	34	(Germany) Walkenhorst Motorsport	(Brazil) Augusto Farfus Jr. (Netherlands) Nick Catsburg (South Africa) Sheldon van der Linde	BMW M6 GT3	277	9:00:30.467
2	P	32	(Belgium) Team WRT	(Belgium) Frédéric Vervisch (Italy) Mirko Bortolotti (Belgium) Charles Weerts	Audi R8 LMS Evo	277	+0.220
3	P	12	(United Arab Emirates) GPX Racing	(Australia) Matthew Campbell (France) Patrick Pilet (France) Mathieu Jaminet	Porsche 911 GT3 R	277	+1.731
4	P	30	(Italy) JAS Motorsport	(Belgium) Bertrand Baguette (Netherlands) Renger van der Zande (Germany) Mario Farnbacher	Honda NSX GT3	277	+3.054
5	P	44	(Germany) Car Collection Motorsport	(Italy) Mattia Drudi (Switzerland) Patric Niederhauser (Germany) Christopher Haase	Audi R8 LMS Evo	277	+51.090
6	P	35	(Germany) Walkenhorst Motorsport	(Germany) Martin Tomczyk (United Kingdom) David Pittard (United Kingdom) Nick Yelloly	BMW M6 GT3	276	+1 lap
7	P	54	(Italy) Dinamic Motorsport	(France) Kévin Estre (New Zealand) Earl Bamber (Belgium) Laurens Vanthoor	Porsche 911 GT3 R	276	+1 lap
8	P	31	(Belgium) Team WRT	(Belgium) Dries Vanthoor (Germany) Markus Winkelhock (South Africa) Kelvin van der Linde	Audi R8 LMS Evo	275	+2 laps
9	P	8	(United Kingdom) M-Sport	(United Kingdom) Alex Buncombe (United Kingdom) Oliver Jarvis (United Kingdom) Sebastian Morris	Bentley Continental GT3	274	+3 laps
10	PA	9	(Austria) Lechner Racing	(South Africa) Saul Hack (South Africa) André Bezuidenhout (Luxembourg) Dylan Pereira	Porsche 911 GT3 R	271	+6 laps
11	S	45	(Germany) Car Collection Motorsport	(Germany) Dennis Marschall (Austria) Martin Lechmann (Netherlands) Milan Dontje	Audi R8 LMS Evo	266	+11 laps
DNF	P	7	(United Kingdom) M-Sport	(Belgium) Maxime Soulet (France) Jules Gounon (South Africa) Jordan Pepper	Bentley Continental GT3	63	Fire

Intercontinental GT Challenge
Previous race: 2020 24 Hours of Spa	2020 season	Next race: 2021 24 Hours of Spa
