= 2020 Intercontinental GT Challenge =

2020 season of a sports car race

The 2020 Intercontinental GT Challenge was the fifth season of the Intercontinental GT Challenge. The season again features five rounds, starting with the Liqui Moly Bathurst 12 Hour on 2 February and concluding with the Kyalami 9 Hours on 12 December. Dennis Olsen is the defending Drivers' champion and Porsche is the defending Manufacturers' champion.

== Calendar ==
At the annual press conference during the 2019 24 Hours of Spa on 26 July, the Stéphane Ratel Organisation announced the first draft of the 2020 calendar. The only change from 2019 was the North American round moving from Laguna Seca Raceway to the Indianapolis Motor Speedway, primarily because of event permit restrictions at Laguna Seca (which is owned by the local government). The Indianapolis event will form a revival of the Speedway's Harvest Auto Racing Classic. The schedule was further changed on 22 May 2020 when the BH Auction SMBC Suzuka 10 Hours on 23 August was canceled because of Japanese entry restrictions as a result of the COVID-19 pandemic. Also, on 22 June 2020, it was announced as a result of the rescheduled 24 Hours of Spa, the race would be extended to 25 hours. The new date falls on the weekend Europe leaves summertime, so clocks are turned back one hour, so the race will run 25 hours, with the original 24 hours name retained. Finally the raced lasted for 24 hours and not for 25 hours.

Round	Race	Circuit	Date	Report
1	Liqui Moly Bathurst 12 Hour	Mount Panorama Circuit, Bathurst, Australia	2 February	Report
2	Indianapolis 8 Hours	Indianapolis Motor Speedway, Indianapolis, United States	4 October	Report
3	24 Hours of Spa	Circuit de Spa-Francorchamps, Stavelot, Belgium	24–25 October	Report
4	Kyalami 9 Hours	Kyalami Grand Prix Circuit, Midrand, South Africa	12 December	Report
Cancelled due to the 2019-20 coronavirus pandemic
Race		Circuit		Original Date
Suzuka 10 Hours		Suzuka Circuit, Suzuka, Japan		23 August

Also part of the Australian Endurance Championship
Also part of the GT World Challenge America
Also part of the GT World Challenge Europe

== Entry list ==
Manufacturer	Team	Car	No.	Drivers	Class	Rounds
Aston Martin	(Switzerland) R-Motorsport	Vantage AMR GT3	62	(United Kingdom) Olli Caldwell	P	1
Aston Martin	(Switzerland) R-Motorsport	Vantage AMR GT3	62	(Italy) Luca Ghiotto	P	1
Aston Martin	(Switzerland) R-Motorsport	Vantage AMR GT3	62	(Germany) Marvin Kirchhöfer	P	1
Aston Martin	(Switzerland) R-Motorsport	Vantage AMR GT3	76	(United Kingdom) Jake Dennis	P	1
Aston Martin	(Switzerland) R-Motorsport	Vantage AMR GT3	76	(New Zealand) Scott Dixon	P	1
Aston Martin	(Switzerland) R-Motorsport	Vantage AMR GT3	76	(Australia) Rick Kelly	P	1
Aston Martin	(United Kingdom) Garage 59	Vantage AMR GT3	159	(Canada) Roman De Angelis	S	1
Aston Martin	(United Kingdom) Garage 59	Vantage AMR GT3	159	(Netherlands) Olivier Hart	S	1
Aston Martin	(United Kingdom) Garage 59	Vantage AMR GT3	159	(United Kingdom) Andrew Watson	S	1
Aston Martin	(United Kingdom) Garage 59	Vantage AMR GT3	188	(United Kingdom) Chris Goodwin	PA	1
Aston Martin	(United Kingdom) Garage 59	Vantage AMR GT3	188	(France) Côme Ledogar	PA	1
Aston Martin	(United Kingdom) Garage 59	Vantage AMR GT3	188	(Belgium) Maxime Martin	PA	1
Aston Martin	(United Kingdom) Garage 59	Vantage AMR GT3	188	(Sweden) Alexander West	PA	1
Audi	(Australia) Audi Sport Team Valvoline	R8 LMS Evo	2	(Germany) Christopher Haase	P	1
Audi	(Australia) Audi Sport Team Valvoline	R8 LMS Evo	2	(Belgium) Dries Vanthoor	P	1
Audi	(Australia) Audi Sport Team Valvoline	R8 LMS Evo	2	(Belgium) Frédéric Vervisch	P	1
Audi	(Australia) Audi Sport Team Valvoline	R8 LMS Evo	22	(Italy) Mirko Bortolotti	P	1
Audi	(Australia) Audi Sport Team Valvoline	R8 LMS Evo	22	(Germany) Christopher Mies	P	1
Audi	(Australia) Audi Sport Team Valvoline	R8 LMS Evo	22	(Australia) Garth Tander	P	1
Audi	(Australia) Audi Sport Team Valvoline	R8 LMS Evo	222	(Italy) Mattia Drudi	P	1
Audi	(Australia) Audi Sport Team Valvoline	R8 LMS Evo	222	(South Africa) Kelvin van der Linde	P	1
Audi	(Australia) Audi Sport Team Valvoline	R8 LMS Evo	222	(Germany) Markus Winkelhock	P	1
Audi	(Australia) Hallmarc	R8 LMS Evo	9	(Australia) Marc Cini	PA	1
Audi	(Australia) Hallmarc	R8 LMS Evo	9	(Australia) Dean Fiore	PA	1
Audi	(Australia) Hallmarc	R8 LMS Evo	9	(Australia) Lee Holdsworth	PA	1
Audi	(France) Audi Sport Team Saintéloc Racing	R8 LMS Evo	25	(France) Dorian Boccolacci	P	3
Audi	(France) Audi Sport Team Saintéloc Racing	R8 LMS Evo	25	(Germany) Christopher Haase	P	3
Audi	(France) Audi Sport Team Saintéloc Racing	R8 LMS Evo	25	(Germany) Markus Winkelhock	P	3
Audi	(United States) Audi Sport Team Hardpoint WRT (Note: Car No. 30 entered as Audi Sport Team WRT, Car No. 31 entered as Audi Sport Team Hardpoint WRT at round 2 and as Audi Sport Team WRT at rounds 3 & 4, Car No. 32 entered as Audi Sport Team WRT Car No. 33 entered as ROFGO Racing with Team WRT.) (Belgium) Audi Sport Team WRT (United Kingdom) ROFGO Racing with Team WRT	R8 LMS Evo	30	(Austria) Ferdinand Habsburg	P	3
Audi	(United States) Audi Sport Team Hardpoint WRT (Belgium) Audi Sport Team WRT (United Kingdom) ROFGO Racing with Team WRT	R8 LMS Evo	30	(Germany) Dennis Marschall	P	3
Audi	(United States) Audi Sport Team Hardpoint WRT (Belgium) Audi Sport Team WRT (United Kingdom) ROFGO Racing with Team WRT	R8 LMS Evo	30	(France) Matthieu Vaxiviere	P	3
Audi	(United States) Audi Sport Team Hardpoint WRT (Belgium) Audi Sport Team WRT (United Kingdom) ROFGO Racing with Team WRT	R8 LMS Evo	31	(Italy) Mirko Bortolotti	P	2
Audi	(United States) Audi Sport Team Hardpoint WRT (Belgium) Audi Sport Team WRT (United Kingdom) ROFGO Racing with Team WRT	R8 LMS Evo	31	(United States) Spencer Pumpelly	P	2
Audi	(United States) Audi Sport Team Hardpoint WRT (Belgium) Audi Sport Team WRT (United Kingdom) ROFGO Racing with Team WRT	R8 LMS Evo	31	(Germany) Markus Winkelhock	P	2, 4
Audi	(United States) Audi Sport Team Hardpoint WRT (Belgium) Audi Sport Team WRT (United Kingdom) ROFGO Racing with Team WRT	R8 LMS Evo	31	(South Africa) Kelvin van der Linde	P	3–4
Audi	(United States) Audi Sport Team Hardpoint WRT (Belgium) Audi Sport Team WRT (United Kingdom) ROFGO Racing with Team WRT	R8 LMS Evo	31	(Belgium) Dries Vanthoor	P	3–4
Audi	(United States) Audi Sport Team Hardpoint WRT (Belgium) Audi Sport Team WRT (United Kingdom) ROFGO Racing with Team WRT	R8 LMS Evo	31	(Germany) Christopher Mies	P	3
Audi	(United States) Audi Sport Team Hardpoint WRT (Belgium) Audi Sport Team WRT (United Kingdom) ROFGO Racing with Team WRT	R8 LMS Evo	32	(Italy) Mirko Bortolotti	P	4
Audi	(United States) Audi Sport Team Hardpoint WRT (Belgium) Audi Sport Team WRT (United Kingdom) ROFGO Racing with Team WRT	R8 LMS Evo	32	(Belgium) Frédéric Vervisch	P	4
Audi	(United States) Audi Sport Team Hardpoint WRT (Belgium) Audi Sport Team WRT (United Kingdom) ROFGO Racing with Team WRT	R8 LMS Evo	32	(Belgium) Charles Weerts	P	4
Audi	(United States) Audi Sport Team Hardpoint WRT (Belgium) Audi Sport Team WRT (United Kingdom) ROFGO Racing with Team WRT	R8 LMS Evo	33	(Netherlands) Rik Breukers	S	3
Audi	(United States) Audi Sport Team Hardpoint WRT (Belgium) Audi Sport Team WRT (United Kingdom) ROFGO Racing with Team WRT	R8 LMS Evo	33	(Denmark) Benjamin Goethe	S	3
Audi	(United States) Audi Sport Team Hardpoint WRT (Belgium) Audi Sport Team WRT (United Kingdom) ROFGO Racing with Team WRT	R8 LMS Evo	33	(United Kingdom) Stuart Hall	S	3
Audi	(Germany) Audi Sport Team Car Collection (Note: Car No. 44 entered as Audi Sport Team Car Collection and Car No. 45 entered as Car Collection.) (Germany) Car Collection	R8 LMS Evo	44	(Italy) Mattia Drudi	P	4
Audi	(Germany) Audi Sport Team Car Collection (Germany) Car Collection	R8 LMS Evo	44	(Germany) Christopher Haase	P	4
Audi	(Germany) Audi Sport Team Car Collection (Germany) Car Collection	R8 LMS Evo	44	(Switzerland) Patric Niederhauser	P	4
Audi	(Germany) Audi Sport Team Car Collection (Germany) Car Collection	R8 LMS Evo	45	(Netherlands) Milan Dontje	S	4
Audi	(Germany) Audi Sport Team Car Collection (Germany) Car Collection	R8 LMS Evo	45	(Austria) Martin Lechman	S	4
Audi	(Germany) Audi Sport Team Car Collection (Germany) Car Collection	R8 LMS Evo	45	(Germany) Dennis Marschall	S	4
Audi	(Germany) Attempto Racing (Note: Car No. 55 entered as Attempto Racing and Car No. 66 entered as Audi Sport Team Attempto Racing.) (Germany) Audi Sport Team Attempto Racing	R8 LMS Evo	55	(Germany) Alex Aka	S	3
Audi	(Germany) Attempto Racing (Germany) Audi Sport Team Attempto Racing	R8 LMS Evo	55	(United Kingdom) Finlay Hutchison	S	3
Audi	(Germany) Attempto Racing (Germany) Audi Sport Team Attempto Racing	R8 LMS Evo	55	(Austria) Nicolas Schöll	S	3
Audi	(Germany) Attempto Racing (Germany) Audi Sport Team Attempto Racing	R8 LMS Evo	55	(Germany) Kim-Luis Schramm	S	3
Audi	(Germany) Attempto Racing (Germany) Audi Sport Team Attempto Racing	R8 LMS Evo	66	(Italy) Mattia Drudi	P	3
Audi	(Germany) Attempto Racing (Germany) Audi Sport Team Attempto Racing	R8 LMS Evo	66	(Switzerland) Patric Niederhauser	P	3
Audi	(Germany) Attempto Racing (Germany) Audi Sport Team Attempto Racing	R8 LMS Evo	66	(Belgium) Frédéric Vervisch	P	3
Bentley	(United States) K-PAX Racing	Continental GT3	3	(France) Jules Gounon	P	3
Bentley	(United States) K-PAX Racing	Continental GT3	3	(South Africa) Jordan Pepper	P	3
Bentley	(United States) K-PAX Racing	Continental GT3	3	(Belgium) Maxime Soulet	P	3
Bentley	(United States) K-PAX Racing	Continental GT3	7	(France) Jules Gounon	P	2
Bentley	(United States) K-PAX Racing	Continental GT3	7	(South Africa) Jordan Pepper	P	2
Bentley	(United States) K-PAX Racing	Continental GT3	7	(Belgium) Maxime Soulet	P	2
Bentley	(United States) K-PAX Racing	Continental GT3	9	(Brazil) Rodrigo Baptista	P	3
Bentley	(United States) K-PAX Racing	Continental GT3	9	(Spain) Andy Soucek	P	3
Bentley	(United States) K-PAX Racing	Continental GT3	9	(Portugal) Álvaro Parente	P	3
Bentley	(United Kingdom) Bentley Team M-Sport	Continental GT3	7	(France) Jules Gounon	P	1, 4
Bentley	(United Kingdom) Bentley Team M-Sport	Continental GT3	7	(South Africa) Jordan Pepper	P	1, 4
Bentley	(United Kingdom) Bentley Team M-Sport	Continental GT3	7	(Belgium) Maxime Soulet	P	1, 4
Bentley	(United Kingdom) Bentley Team M-Sport	Continental GT3	8	(United Kingdom) Alex Buncombe	P	1, 4
Bentley	(United Kingdom) Bentley Team M-Sport	Continental GT3	8	(United Kingdom) Oliver Jarvis	P	1, 4
Bentley	(United Kingdom) Bentley Team M-Sport	Continental GT3	8	(United Kingdom) Seb Morris	P	1, 4
Bentley	(United Kingdom) Team Parker Racing	Continental GT3	11	(United Kingdom) Frank Bird	S	3
Bentley	(United Kingdom) Team Parker Racing	Continental GT3	11	(Denmark) Nicolai Kjærgaard	S	3
Bentley	(United Kingdom) Team Parker Racing	Continental GT3	11	(United Kingdom) Euan McKay	S	3
Bentley	(France) CMR	Continental GT3	107	(United Kingdom) Seb Morris	P	3
Bentley	(France) CMR	Continental GT3	107	(France) Pierre-Alexandre Jean	P	3
Bentley	(France) CMR	Continental GT3	107	(France) Nelson Panciatici	P	3
Bentley	(France) CMR	Continental GT3	108	(France) Stéphane Lémeret	Am	3
Bentley	(France) CMR	Continental GT3	108	(France) Clement Mateu	Am	3
Bentley	(France) CMR	Continental GT3	108	(France) Romano Ricci	Am	3
Bentley	(France) CMR	Continental GT3	108	(Belgium) Stéphane Tribaudini	Am	3
BMW	(Belgium) Boutsen Ginion	M6 GT3	10	(Germany) Jens Klingmann	PA	3
BMW	(Belgium) Boutsen Ginion	M6 GT3	10	(Belgium) Benjamin Lessennes	PA	3
BMW	(Belgium) Boutsen Ginion	M6 GT3	10	(Saudi Arabia) Karim Ojjeh	PA	3
BMW	(Belgium) Boutsen Ginion	M6 GT3	10	(France) Gilles Vannelet	PA	3
BMW	(Germany) Walkenhorst Motorsport	M6 GT3	34	(Netherlands) Nicky Catsburg	P	All
BMW	(Germany) Walkenhorst Motorsport	M6 GT3	34	(Brazil) Augusto Farfus	P	All
BMW	(Germany) Walkenhorst Motorsport	M6 GT3	34	(Australia) Chaz Mostert	P	1
BMW	(Germany) Walkenhorst Motorsport	M6 GT3	34	(United States) Connor De Phillippi	P	2
BMW	(Germany) Walkenhorst Motorsport	M6 GT3	34	(Austria) Philipp Eng	P	3
BMW	(Germany) Walkenhorst Motorsport	M6 GT3	34	(South Africa) Sheldon van der Linde	P	4
BMW	(Germany) Walkenhorst Motorsport	M6 GT3	35	(United Kingdom) David Pittard	P	2–4
BMW	(Germany) Walkenhorst Motorsport	M6 GT3	35	(Germany) Martin Tomczyk	P	2–4
BMW	(Germany) Walkenhorst Motorsport	M6 GT3	35	(United Kingdom) Nick Yelloly	P	2–4
Ferrari	(Italy) Squadra Corse	488 GT3	1	(Italy) Alessandro Balzan	PA	2
Ferrari	(Italy) Squadra Corse	488 GT3	1	(Mexico) Martin Fuentes	PA	2
Ferrari	(Italy) Squadra Corse	488 GT3	1	(United States) Mark Issa	PA	2
Ferrari	(United States) Vital Speed	488 GT3	6	(United States) Trevor Baek	P	2
Ferrari	(United States) Vital Speed	488 GT3	6	(Australia) Ryan Briscoe	P	2
Ferrari	(United States) Vital Speed	488 GT3	6	(United States) Jeff Westphal	P	2
Ferrari	(Chinese Taipei) HubAuto Corsa	488 GT3	27	(Brazil) Marcos Gomes	P	1, 3
Ferrari	(Chinese Taipei) HubAuto Corsa	488 GT3	27	(Brazil) Daniel Serra	P	1
Ferrari	(Chinese Taipei) HubAuto Corsa	488 GT3	27	(Australia) Tim Slade	P	1
Ferrari	(Chinese Taipei) HubAuto Corsa	488 GT3	27	(United Kingdom) Tom Blomqvist	P	3
Ferrari	(Chinese Taipei) HubAuto Corsa	488 GT3	27	(Japan) Kamui Kobayashi	P	3
Ferrari	(Italy) AF Corse	488 GT3	51	(United Kingdom) James Calado	P	3
Ferrari	(Italy) AF Corse	488 GT3	51	(Italy) Alessandro Pier Guidi	P	3
Ferrari	(Italy) AF Corse	488 GT3	51	(Denmark) Nicklas Nielsen	P	3
Ferrari	(Italy) AF Corse	488 GT3	52	(Italy) Andrea Bertolini	PA	3
Ferrari	(Italy) AF Corse	488 GT3	52	(Netherlands) Niek Hommerson	PA	3
Ferrari	(Italy) AF Corse	488 GT3	52	(Belgium) Louis Machiels	PA	3
Ferrari	(Italy) AF Corse	488 GT3	52	(Brazil) Daniel Serra	PA	3
Ferrari	(Russia) SMP Racing	488 GT3	72	(Spain) Miguel Molina	P	3
Ferrari	(Russia) SMP Racing	488 GT3	72	(Italy) Davide Rigon	P	3
Ferrari	(Russia) SMP Racing	488 GT3	72	(Russia) Sergey Sirotkin	P	3
Ferrari	(United Kingdom) Sky - Tempesta Racing	488 GT3	93	(Italy) Eddie Cheever	PA	3
Ferrari	(United Kingdom) Sky - Tempesta Racing	488 GT3	93	(Italy) Giancarlo Fisichella	PA	3
Ferrari	(United Kingdom) Sky - Tempesta Racing	488 GT3	93	(United Kingdom) Chris Froggatt	PA	3
Ferrari	(United Kingdom) Sky - Tempesta Racing	488 GT3	93	(Hong Kong) Jonathan Hui	PA	3
Ferrari	(Germany) Rinaldi Racing	488 GT3	488	(Germany) Pierre Ehret	PA	3
Ferrari	(Germany) Rinaldi Racing	488 GT3	488	(Germany) Daniel Keilwitz	PA	3
Ferrari	(Germany) Rinaldi Racing	488 GT3	488	(Italy) Rino Mastronardi	PA	3
Ferrari	(Germany) Rinaldi Racing	488 GT3	488	(South Africa) David Perel	PA	3
Honda	(Italy) Team Honda Racing	NSX GT3 Evo	29	(United States) Dane Cameron	P	3
Honda	(Italy) Team Honda Racing	NSX GT3 Evo	29	(Germany) Mario Farnbacher	P	3
Honda	(Italy) Team Honda Racing	NSX GT3 Evo	29	(Netherlands) Renger van der Zande	P	3
Honda	(Italy) Team Honda Racing	NSX GT3 Evo	30	(Germany) Mario Farnbacher	P	1–2, 4
Honda	(Italy) Team Honda Racing	NSX GT3 Evo	30	(Netherlands) Renger van der Zande	P	1–2, 4
Honda	(Italy) Team Honda Racing	NSX GT3 Evo	30	(United States) Dane Cameron	P	1–2
Honda	(Italy) Team Honda Racing	NSX GT3 Evo	30	(Belgium) Bertrand Baguette	P	4
Honda	(United States) Racers Edge Motorsports	NSX GT3 Evo	93	(United States) Shelby Blackstock	P	2
Honda	(United States) Racers Edge Motorsports	NSX GT3 Evo	93	(United States) Trent Hindman	P	2
Honda	(United States) Racers Edge Motorsports	NSX GT3 Evo	93	(United States) Robert Megennis	P	2
Lamborghini	(Switzerland) Emil Frey Racing	Huracán GT3 Evo	14	(Switzerland) Ricardo Feller	P	3
Lamborghini	(Switzerland) Emil Frey Racing	Huracán GT3 Evo	14	(Canada) Mikaël Grenier	P	3
Lamborghini	(Switzerland) Emil Frey Racing	Huracán GT3 Evo	14	(Austria) Norbert Siedler	P	3
Lamborghini	(Switzerland) Emil Frey Racing	Huracán GT3 Evo	163	(Italy) Giacomo Altoè	P	3
Lamborghini	(Switzerland) Emil Frey Racing	Huracán GT3 Evo	163	(Spain) Albert Costa	P	3
Lamborghini	(Switzerland) Emil Frey Racing	Huracán GT3 Evo	163	(France) Franck Perera	P	3
Lamborghini	(China) Orange1 FFF Racing Team	Huracán GT3 Evo	19	(Italy) Raffaele Giammaria	PA	3
Lamborghini	(China) Orange1 FFF Racing Team	Huracán GT3 Evo	19	(Japan) Hiroshi Hamaguchi	PA	3
Lamborghini	(China) Orange1 FFF Racing Team	Huracán GT3 Evo	19	(United Kingdom) Phil Keen	PA	3
Lamborghini	(China) Orange1 FFF Racing Team	Huracán GT3 Evo	19	(Italy) Luigi Moccia	PA	3
Lamborghini	(China) Orange1 FFF Racing Team	Huracán GT3 Evo	63	(Italy) Andrea Caldarelli	P	1, 3
Lamborghini	(China) Orange1 FFF Racing Team	Huracán GT3 Evo	63	(Denmark) Dennis Lind	P	1, 3
Lamborghini	(China) Orange1 FFF Racing Team	Huracán GT3 Evo	63	(Italy) Marco Mapelli	P	1, 3
Lamborghini	(United Kingdom) Barwell Motorsport	Huracán GT3 Evo	77	(United Kingdom) Ricky Collard	PA	3
Lamborghini	(United Kingdom) Barwell Motorsport	Huracán GT3 Evo	77	(United Kingdom) Rob Collard	PA	3
Lamborghini	(United Kingdom) Barwell Motorsport	Huracán GT3 Evo	77	(Russia) Leo Machitski	PA	3
Lamborghini	(United Kingdom) Barwell Motorsport	Huracán GT3 Evo	77	(United Kingdom) Sandy Mitchell	PA	3
Lamborghini	(United Kingdom) Barwell Motorsport	Huracán GT3 Evo	78	(Finland) Patrick Kujala	S	3
Lamborghini	(United Kingdom) Barwell Motorsport	Huracán GT3 Evo	78	(United Kingdom) Alex MacDowall	S	3
Lamborghini	(United Kingdom) Barwell Motorsport	Huracán GT3 Evo	78	(Denmark) Frederik Schandorff	S	3
Mercedes-AMG	(Australia) SunEnergy1 Racing	AMG GT3	75	(Austria) Dominik Baumann	PA	1
Mercedes-AMG	(Australia) SunEnergy1 Racing	AMG GT3	75	(Australia) Kenny Habul	PA	1
Mercedes-AMG	(Australia) SunEnergy1 Racing	AMG GT3	75	(Austria) Martin Konrad	PA	1
Mercedes-AMG	(Australia) SunEnergy1 Racing	AMG GT3	75	(Australia) David Reynolds	PA	1
Mercedes-AMG	(Germany) Mercedes-AMG Team HRT (Note: Car No. 4 entered as Mercedes-AMG Team HRT, Car No. 5 entered as Haupt Racing Team.) (Germany) Haupt Racing Team	AMG GT3 Evo	4	(Monaco) Vincent Abril	P	3
Mercedes-AMG	(Germany) Mercedes-AMG Team HRT (Germany) Haupt Racing Team	AMG GT3 Evo	4	(Germany) Maro Engel	P	3
Mercedes-AMG	(Germany) Mercedes-AMG Team HRT (Germany) Haupt Racing Team	AMG GT3 Evo	4	(Germany) Luca Stolz	P	3
Mercedes-AMG	(Germany) Mercedes-AMG Team HRT (Germany) Haupt Racing Team	AMG GT3 Evo	5	(Russia) Sergey Afanasyev	PA	3
Mercedes-AMG	(Germany) Mercedes-AMG Team HRT (Germany) Haupt Racing Team	AMG GT3 Evo	5	(Italy) Michele Beretta	PA	3
Mercedes-AMG	(Germany) Mercedes-AMG Team HRT (Germany) Haupt Racing Team	AMG GT3 Evo	5	(Germany) Hubert Haupt	PA	3
Mercedes-AMG	(Germany) Mercedes-AMG Team HRT (Germany) Haupt Racing Team	AMG GT3 Evo	5	(Italy) Gabriele Piana	PA	3
Mercedes-AMG	(United States) DXDT Racing	AMG GT3 Evo	04	(United States) Colin Braun	PA	2
Mercedes-AMG	(United States) DXDT Racing	AMG GT3 Evo	04	(United States) Ben Keating	PA	2
Mercedes-AMG	(United States) DXDT Racing	AMG GT3 Evo	04	(United States) George Kurtz	PA	2
Mercedes-AMG	(United States) DXDT Racing	AMG GT3 Evo	63	(United States) David Askew	PA	2
Mercedes-AMG	(United States) DXDT Racing	AMG GT3 Evo	63	(United Kingdom) Ryan Dalziel	PA	2
Mercedes-AMG	(United States) DXDT Racing	AMG GT3 Evo	63	(United States) Richard Heistand	PA	2
Mercedes-AMG	(United States) CrowdStrike Racing with SPS	AMG GT3 Evo	20	(Austria) Dominik Baumann	PA	3
Mercedes-AMG	(United States) CrowdStrike Racing with SPS	AMG GT3 Evo	20	(United States) Colin Braun	PA	3
Mercedes-AMG	(United States) CrowdStrike Racing with SPS	AMG GT3 Evo	20	(United States) George Kurtz	PA	3
Mercedes-AMG	(United States) CrowdStrike Racing with SPS	AMG GT3 Evo	20	(Germany) Valentin Pierburg	PA	3
Mercedes-AMG	(Australia) SunEnergy1 Racing	AMG GT3 Evo	75	(Canada) Mikaël Grenier	PA	2
Mercedes-AMG	(Australia) SunEnergy1 Racing	AMG GT3 Evo	75	(United States) Kenny Habul	PA	2
Mercedes-AMG	(Australia) SunEnergy1 Racing	AMG GT3 Evo	75	(Austria) Martin Konrad	PA	2
Mercedes-AMG	(Hong Kong) Mercedes-AMG Team Craft-Bamboo Black Falcon	AMG GT3 Evo	77	(Netherlands) Yelmer Buurman	P	1
Mercedes-AMG	(Hong Kong) Mercedes-AMG Team Craft-Bamboo Black Falcon	AMG GT3 Evo	77	(Germany) Maro Engel	P	1
Mercedes-AMG	(Hong Kong) Mercedes-AMG Team Craft-Bamboo Black Falcon	AMG GT3 Evo	77	(Germany) Luca Stolz	P	1
Mercedes-AMG	(Germany) HTP Motorsport	AMG GT3 Evo	84	(Netherlands) Indy Dontje	S	3
Mercedes-AMG	(Germany) HTP Motorsport	AMG GT3 Evo	84	(United Kingdom) Philip Ellis	S	3
Mercedes-AMG	(Germany) HTP Motorsport	AMG GT3 Evo	84	(United States) Russell Ward	S	3
Mercedes-AMG	(France) Mercedes-AMG Team AKKA ASP (Note: Car No. 88 entered as Mercedes-AMG Team AKKA ASP, and Car No. 89 entered as AKKA ASP) (France) AKKA ASP	AMG GT3 Evo	88	(Russia) Timur Boguslavskiy	P	3
Mercedes-AMG	(France) Mercedes-AMG Team AKKA ASP (France) AKKA ASP	AMG GT3 Evo	88	(Brazil) Felipe Fraga	P	3
Mercedes-AMG	(France) Mercedes-AMG Team AKKA ASP (France) AKKA ASP	AMG GT3 Evo	88	(Italy) Raffaele Marciello	P	3
Mercedes-AMG	(France) Mercedes-AMG Team AKKA ASP (France) AKKA ASP	AMG GT3 Evo	89	(Switzerland) Alex Fontana	S	3
Mercedes-AMG	(France) Mercedes-AMG Team AKKA ASP (France) AKKA ASP	AMG GT3 Evo	89	(Chile) Benjamín Hites	S	3
Mercedes-AMG	(France) Mercedes-AMG Team AKKA ASP (France) AKKA ASP	AMG GT3 Evo	89	(Switzerland) Lucas Légeret	S	3
Mercedes-AMG	(Australia) Triple Eight Race Engineering	AMG GT3 Evo	888	(New Zealand) Shane van Gisbergen	P	1
Mercedes-AMG	(Australia) Triple Eight Race Engineering	AMG GT3 Evo	888	(Germany) Maximilian Götz	P	1
Mercedes-AMG	(Australia) Triple Eight Race Engineering	AMG GT3 Evo	888	(Australia) Jamie Whincup	P	1
Mercedes-AMG	(Hong Kong) Mercedes-AMG Team GruppeM Racing	AMG GT3 Evo	999	(Germany) Maximilian Buhk	P	1
Mercedes-AMG	(Hong Kong) Mercedes-AMG Team GruppeM Racing	AMG GT3 Evo	999	(Brazil) Felipe Fraga	P	1
Mercedes-AMG	(Hong Kong) Mercedes-AMG Team GruppeM Racing	AMG GT3 Evo	999	(Italy) Raffaele Marciello	P	1
Porsche	(New Zealand) Earl Bamber Motorsport	911 GT3 R	1	(New Zealand) Earl Bamber	P	1
Porsche	(New Zealand) Earl Bamber Motorsport	911 GT3 R	1	(Australia) Craig Lowndes	P	1
Porsche	(New Zealand) Earl Bamber Motorsport	911 GT3 R	1	(Belgium) Laurens Vanthoor	P	1
Porsche	(New Zealand) Earl Bamber Motorsport	911 GT3 R	12	(Australia) David Calvert-Jones	PA	1
Porsche	(New Zealand) Earl Bamber Motorsport	911 GT3 R	12	(France) Romain Dumas	PA	1
Porsche	(New Zealand) Earl Bamber Motorsport	911 GT3 R	12	(New Zealand) Jaxon Evans	PA	1
Porsche	(Austria) Lechner Racing	911 GT3 R	9	(South Africa) Andre Bezuidenhout	PA	4
Porsche	(Austria) Lechner Racing	911 GT3 R	9	(South Africa) Saul Hack	PA	4
Porsche	(Austria) Lechner Racing	911 GT3 R	9	(Luxembourg) Dylan Pereira	PA	4
Porsche	(United Arab Emirates) GPX Racing	911 GT3 R	12	(Australia) Matt Campbell	P	3–4
Porsche	(United Arab Emirates) GPX Racing	911 GT3 R	12	(France) Mathieu Jaminet	P	3–4
Porsche	(United Arab Emirates) GPX Racing	911 GT3 R	12	(France) Patrick Pilet	P	3–4
Porsche	(United States) Wright Motorsports	911 GT3 R	20	(Belgium) Jan Heylen	PA	2
Porsche	(United States) Wright Motorsports	911 GT3 R	20	(United States) Fred Poordad	PA	2
Porsche	(United States) Wright Motorsports	911 GT3 R	20	(United States) Max Root	PA	2
Porsche	(Germany) Frikadelli Racing Team	911 GT3 R	22	(Germany) Timo Bernhard	P	3
Porsche	(Germany) Frikadelli Racing Team	911 GT3 R	22	(France) Frédéric Makowiecki	P	3
Porsche	(Germany) Frikadelli Racing Team	911 GT3 R	22	(Norway) Dennis Olsen	P	3
Porsche	(Hong Kong) KCMG	911 GT3 R	47	(Denmark) Michael Christensen	P	3
Porsche	(Hong Kong) KCMG	911 GT3 R	47	(France) Kévin Estre	P	3
Porsche	(Hong Kong) KCMG	911 GT3 R	47	(Austria) Richard Lietz	P	3
Porsche	(Italy) Dinamic Motorsport	911 GT3 R	54	(New Zealand) Earl Bamber	P	4
Porsche	(Italy) Dinamic Motorsport	911 GT3 R	54	(France) Kévin Estre	P	4
Porsche	(Italy) Dinamic Motorsport	911 GT3 R	54	(Belgium) Laurens Vanthoor	P	4
Porsche	(Italy) Dinamic Motorsport	911 GT3 R	56	(Belgium) Adrien de Leener	S	3
Porsche	(Italy) Dinamic Motorsport	911 GT3 R	56	(Denmark) Mikkel O. Pedersen	S	3
Porsche	(Italy) Dinamic Motorsport	911 GT3 R	56	(Italy) Andrea Rizzoli	S	3
Porsche	(Italy) Dinamic Motorsport	911 GT3 R	56	(Monaco) Cédric Sbirrazzuoli	S	3
Porsche	(Germany) Rowe Racing	911 GT3 R	98	(New Zealand) Earl Bamber	P	3
Porsche	(Germany) Rowe Racing	911 GT3 R	98	(United Kingdom) Nick Tandy	P	3
Porsche	(Germany) Rowe Racing	911 GT3 R	98	(Belgium) Laurens Vanthoor	P	3
Porsche	(China) Absolute Racing	911 GT3 R	911	(Australia) Matt Campbell	P	1
Porsche	(China) Absolute Racing	911 GT3 R	911	(France) Mathieu Jaminet	P	1
Porsche	(China) Absolute Racing	911 GT3 R	911	(France) Patrick Pilet	P	1
Porsche	(China) Absolute Racing	911 GT3 R	912	(Italy) Matteo Cairoli	P	1
Porsche	(China) Absolute Racing	911 GT3 R	912	(Austria) Thomas Preining	P	1
Porsche	(China) Absolute Racing	911 GT3 R	912	(Germany) Dirk Werner	P	1
Porsche	(Germany) Herberth Motorsport	911 GT3 R	991	(Switzerland) Daniel Allemann	PA	3
Porsche	(Germany) Herberth Motorsport	911 GT3 R	991	(Germany) Ralf Bohn	PA	3
Porsche	(Germany) Herberth Motorsport	911 GT3 R	991	(Germany) Alfred Renauer	PA	3
Porsche	(Germany) Herberth Motorsport	911 GT3 R	991	(Germany) Robert Renauer	PA	3

Icon	Class
P	Pro Cup
S	Silver Cup
PA	Pro-Am Cup
Am	Am Cup

== Race results ==
Rnd.	Circuit	Pole position	IGTC Winners	Winning Manufacturer	Ref.
1	(Australia) Bathurst	(China) No. 911 Absolute Racing	(United Kingdom) No. 7 Bentley Team M-Sport	(Germany) Mercedes-AMG	
1	(Australia) Bathurst	(Australia) Matt Campbell (France) Mathieu Jaminet (France) Patrick Pilet	(France) Jules Gounon (South Africa) Jordan Pepper (Belgium) Maxime Soulet	(Germany) Mercedes-AMG	
2	(United States) Indianapolis	(Germany) No. 34 Walkenhorst Motorsport	(Germany) No. 34 Walkenhorst Motorsport	(Germany) BMW	
2	(United States) Indianapolis	(Netherlands) Nicky Catsburg (United States) Connor De Phillippi (Brazil) Augusto Farfus	(Netherlands) Nicky Catsburg (United States) Connor De Phillippi (Brazil) Augusto Farfus	(Germany) BMW	
3	(Belgium) Spa-Francorchamps	(France) No. 88 Mercedes-AMG Team AKKA ASP	(Germany) No. 98 Rowe Racing	(Germany) Porsche	
3	(Belgium) Spa-Francorchamps	(Russia) Timur Boguslavskiy (Brazil) Felipe Fraga (Italy) Raffaele Marciello	(New Zealand) Earl Bamber (United Kingdom) Nick Tandy (Belgium) Laurens Vanthoor	(Germany) Porsche	
4	(South Africa) Kyalami	(Italy) No. 30 Team Honda Racing	(Germany) No. 34 Walkenhorst Motorsport	(Germany) BMW	
4	(South Africa) Kyalami	(Belgium) Bertrand Baguette (Germany) Mario Farnbacher (Netherlands) Renger van der Zande	(Netherlands) Nicky Catsburg (Brazil) Augusto Farfus (South Africa) Sheldon van der Linde	(Germany) BMW	

== Championship standings ==
Scoring System

Championship points were awarded for the first ten positions in each race. Entries were required to complete 75% of the winning car's race distance in order to be classified and earn points, with the exception of Bathurst where a car simply had to cross the finish line to be classified. Individual drivers were required to participate for a minimum of 25 minutes in order to earn championship points in any race. A manufacturer only received points for its two highest placed cars in each round.

Position	1st	2nd	3rd	4th	5th	6th	7th	8th	9th	10th
Points	25	18	15	12	10	8	6	4	2	1

=== Driver's championship ===
The results indicate the classification relative to other drivers in the series, not the classification in the race.

Pos.	Driver	Manufacturer	BAT (Australia)	IND (United States)	SPA (Belgium)	KYA (South Africa)	Points
1	(Netherlands) Nicky Catsburg (Brazil) Augusto Farfus	BMW	Ret	**1**	Ret	1	50
2	(Australia) Matt Campbell (France) Mathieu Jaminet (France) Patrick Pilet	Porsche	**3**		3	3	45
3	(New Zealand) Earl Bamber (Belgium) Laurens Vanthoor	Porsche	7		1	7	37
4	(Belgium) Frédéric Vervisch	Audi	Ret		2	2	36
5	(Germany) Mario Farnbacher (Netherlands) Renger van der Zande	Honda	Ret	3	8	**4**	31
6	(Italy) Mirko Bortolotti	Audi	Ret	4		2	30
7	(France) Jules Gounon (South Africa) Jordan Pepper (Belgium) Maxime Soulet	Bentley	1	10	9	Ret	28
8	(Italy) Mattia Drudi	Audi	12		2	5	28
8	(Switzerland) Patric Niederhauser	Audi			2	5	28
9	(United Kingdom) David Pittard (Germany) Martin Tomczyk (United Kingdom) Nick Yelloly	BMW		2	Ret	6	26
9	(Germany) Markus Winkelhock	Audi	12	4	5	8	26
10	(United States) Connor De Phillippi	BMW		**1**			25
10	(United Kingdom) Nick Tandy	Porsche			1		25
10	(South Africa) Sheldon van der Linde	BMW				1	25
11	(Germany) Maro Engel (Germany) Luca Stolz	Mercedes-AMG	4		6		20
11	(Germany) Christopher Haase	Audi	Ret		5	5	20
12	(United States) Dane Cameron	Honda	Ret	3	8		19
13	(New Zealand) Shane van Gisbergen (Germany) Maximilian Götz (Australia) Jamie Whincup	Mercedes-AMG	2				18
14	(Belgium) Charles Weerts	Audi				2	18
15	(Netherlands) Yelmer Buurman	Mercedes-AMG	4				12
15	(United States) Spencer Pumpelly	Audi		4			12
15	(United Kingdom) James Calado (Italy) Alessandro Pier Guidi (Denmark) Nicklas Nielsen	Ferrari			4		12
15	(Belgium) Bertrand Baguette	Honda				**4**	12
16	(Brazil) Felipe Fraga (Italy) Raffaele Marciello	Mercedes-AMG	5		**Ret**		10
16	(Germany) Maximilian Buhk	Mercedes-AMG	5				10
16	(United States) Colin Braun (United States) George Kurtz	Mercedes-AMG		5	22		10
16	(United States) Ben Keating	Mercedes-AMG		5			10
16	(France) Dorian Boccolacci	Audi			5		10
17	(Italy) Matteo Cairoli (Austria) Thomas Preining (Germany) Dirk Werner	Porsche	6				8
17	(Belgium) Jan Heylen (United States) Fred Poordad (United States) Max Root	Porsche		6			8
17	(Monaco) Vincent Abril	Mercedes-AMG			6		8
18	(Australia) Craig Lowndes	Porsche	7				6
18	(United States) Shelby Blackstock (United States) Trent Hindman (United States) Robert Megennis	Honda		7			6
18	(Germany) Jörg Bergmeister (France) Frédéric Makowiecki (Norway) Dennis Olsen	Porsche			7		6
18	(France) Kévin Estre	Porsche			11	7	6
19	(Australia) David Calvert-Jones (France) Romain Dumas (New Zealand) Jaxon Evans	Porsche	8				4
19	(Italy) Alessandro Balzan (Mexico) Martin Fuentes (United States) Mark Issa	Ferrari		8			4
19	(South Africa) Kelvin van der Linde	Audi	12		Ret	8	4
19	(Belgium) Dries Vanthoor	Audi	Ret		Ret	8	4
20	(Canada) Roman De Angelis (Netherlands) Olivier Hart (United Kingdom) Andrew Watson	Aston Martin	9				2
20	(Australia) Kenny Habul (Austria) Martin Konrad	Mercedes-AMG	13	9			2
20	(Canada) Mikaël Grenier	Mercedes-AMG		9			2
20	(Canada) Mikaël Grenier	Lamborghini			14		2
20	(United Kingdom) Seb Morris	Bentley	Ret		27	9	2
20	(United Kingdom) Alex Buncombe (United Kingdom) Oliver Jarvis	Bentley	Ret			9	2
21	(United Kingdom) Jake Dennis (New Zealand) Scott Dixon (Australia) Rick Kelly	Aston Martin	10				1
21	(Brazil) Rodrigo Baptista (Portugal) Álvaro Parente (Spain) Andy Soucek	Bentley			10		1
21	(South Africa) Andre Bezuidenhout (South Africa) Saul Hack (Luxembourg) Dylan Pereira	Porsche				10	1
	(Germany) Dennis Marschall	Audi			12	11	0
	(Australia) Marc Cini (Australia) Dean Fiore (Australia) Lee Holdsworth	Audi	11				0
	(Denmark) Michael Christensen (Austria) Richard Lietz	Porsche			11		0
	(Netherlands) Milan Dontje (Austria) Martin Lechman	Audi				11	0
	(Austria) Ferdinand Habsburg (France) Mathieu Vaxivierè	Audi			12		0
	(Austria) Dominik Baumann	Mercedes-AMG	13		22		0
	(Australia) David Reynolds	Mercedes-AMG	13				0
	(United Kingdom) Ricky Collard (United Kingdom) Rob Collard (Russia) Leo Machitski (United Kingdom) Sandy Mitchell	Lamborghini			13		0
	(Switzerland) Ricardo Feller (Austria) Norbert Siedler	Lamborghini			14		0
	(Italy) Eddie Cheever (Italy) Giancarlo Fisichella (United Kingdom) Chris Froggatt (Hong Kong) Jonathan Hui	Ferrari			15		0
	(Russia) Sergey Afanasyev (Italy) Michele Beretta (Germany) Hubert Haupt (Italy) Gabriele Piana	Mercedes-AMG			16		0
	(Spain) Miguel Molina (Italy) Davide Rigon (Russia) Sergey Sirotkin	Ferrari			17		0
	(Netherlands) Indy Dontje (United Kingdom) Philip Ellis (United States) Russel Ward	Mercedes-AMG			18		0
	(Germany) Pierre Ehret (Germany) Daniel Keilwitz (South Africa) David Perel (Italy) Rino Mastronardi	Ferrari			19		0
	(Brazil) Marcos Gomes	Ferrari	WD		20		0
	(United Kingdom) Tom Blomqvist (Japan) Kamui Kobayashi	Ferrari			20		0
	(Germany) Jens Klingmann (Belgium) Benjamin Lessennes (Saudi Arabia) Karim Ojjeh (France) Gilles Vannelet	BMW			21		0
	(Germany) Valentin Pierburg	Mercedes-AMG			22		0
	(United Kingdom) Frank Bird (Denmark) Nicolai Kjærgaard (United Kingdom) Euan McKay	Bentley			23		0
	(Switzerland) Alex Fontana (Chile) Benjamín Hites (Switzerland) Lucas Légeret	Mercedes-AMG			24		0
	(Belgium) Stéphane Lémeret (France) Clement Mateu (France) Romano Ricci (France) Stéphane Tribaudini	Bentley			25		0
	(Italy) Giacomo Altoè (Spain) Albert Costa (France) Franck Perera	Lamborghini			26		0
	(France) Pierre-Alexandre Jean (France) Nelson Panciatici	Bentley			27		0
	(Netherlands) Rik Breukers (Denmark) Benjamin Goethe (United Kingdom) Stuart Hall	Audi			28		0
	(Brazil) Daniel Serra	Ferrari	WD		29		0
	(Italy) Andrea Bertolini (Netherlands) Niek Hommerson (Belgium) Louis Machiels	Ferrari			29		0
	(Finland) Patrick Kujala (United Kingdom) Alex MacDowall (Denmark) Frederik Schandorff	Lamborghini			30		0
	(Switzerland) Daniel Allemann (Germany) Ralf Bohn (Germany) Alfred Renauer (Germany) Robert Renauer	Porsche			31		0
	(Italy) Andrea Caldarelli (Denmark) Dennis Lind (Italy) Marco Mapelli	Lamborghini	Ret		32		0
	(Germany) Christopher Mies	Audi	Ret		Ret		0
	(Australia) Chaz Mostert	BMW	Ret				0
	(Australia) Garth Tander	Audi	Ret				0
	(United Kingdom) Chris Goodwin (France) Côme Ledogar (Belgium) Maxime Martin (Sweden) Alexander West	Aston Martin	Ret				0
	(United States) David Askew (United Kingdom) Ryan Dalziel (United States) Richard Heistand	Mercedes-AMG		Ret			0
	(United States) Trevor Baek (Australia) Ryan Briscoe (United States) Jeff Westphal	Ferrari		Ret			0
	(Russia) Timur Boguslavskiy	Mercedes-AMG			**Ret**		0
	(Belgium) Adrien de Leener (Denmark) Mikkel O. Pedersen (Italy) Andrea Rizzoli (Monaco) Cédric Sbirrazzuoli	Porsche			Ret		0
	(Austria) Philipp Eng	BMW			Ret		0
	(Italy) Raffaele Giammaria (Japan) Hiroshi Hamaguchi (United Kingdom) Phil Keen (Italy) Luigi Moccia	Lamborghini			Ret		0
	(Germany) Alex Aka (France) Simon Gachet (United Kingdom) Finlay Hutchison (Austria) Nicolas Schöll	Audi			Ret		0
	(Australia) Tim Slade	Ferrari	WD				
	(United Kingdom) Olli Caldwell (Italy) Luca Ghiotto (Germany) Marvin Kirchhöfer	Aston Martin	WD				
Pos.	Driver	Manufacturer	BAT (Australia)	IND (United States)	SPA (Belgium)	KYA (South Africa)	Points

Colour	Result
Gold	Winner
Silver	Second place
Bronze	Third place
Green	Points classification
Blue	Non-points classification
Blue	Non-classified finish (NC)
Purple	Retired, not classified (Ret)
Red	Did not qualify (DNQ)
Red	Did not pre-qualify (DNPQ)
Black	Disqualified (DSQ)
White	Did not start (DNS)
White	Withdrew (WD)
White	Race cancelled (C)
Blank	Did not practice (DNP)
Blank	Did not arrive (DNA)
Blank	Excluded (EX)

**Bold** – Pole
Italics – Fastest Lap

=== Manufacturer's championship ===
Pos.	Manufacturer	Car	BAT (Australia)	IND (United States)	SPA (Belgium)	KYA (South Africa)	Points
1	(Germany) Porsche	911 GT3 R	**3**	6	1	3	100
1	(Germany) Porsche	911 GT3 R	6		3	7	100
1	(Germany) Porsche	911 GT3 R			7		100
2	(Germany) BMW	M6 GT3	Ret	**1**	21	1	76
2	(Germany) BMW	M6 GT3		2	Ret	6	76
2	(Germany) BMW	M6 GT3			Ret		76
3	(Germany) Audi	R8 LMS Evo	11	4	2	2	74
3	(Germany) Audi	R8 LMS Evo	12		5	5	74
3	(Germany) Audi	R8 LMS Evo			12		74
4	(Germany) Mercedes-AMG	AMG GT3; AMG GT3 Evo	2	5	**6**		50
4	(Germany) Mercedes-AMG	AMG GT3; AMG GT3 Evo	4	9	16		50
4	(Germany) Mercedes-AMG	AMG GT3; AMG GT3 Evo			18		50
5	(Japan) Honda	NSX GT3 Evo	Ret	3	8	**4**	37
5	(Japan) Honda	NSX GT3 Evo		7			37
6	(United Kingdom) Bentley	Continental GT3	1	10	9	9	33
6	(United Kingdom) Bentley	Continental GT3	Ret		10	Ret	33
6	(United Kingdom) Bentley	Continental GT3			23		33
7	(Italy) Ferrari	488 GT3; 488 GT3 Evo 2020	WD	8	4		16
7	(Italy) Ferrari	488 GT3; 488 GT3 Evo 2020		Ret	15		16
7	(Italy) Ferrari	488 GT3; 488 GT3 Evo 2020			17		16
8	(United Kingdom) Aston Martin	Vantage AMR GT3	9				14
8	(United Kingdom) Aston Martin	Vantage AMR GT3	10				14
	(Italy) Lamborghini	Huracán GT3 Evo	Ret		13		0
	(Italy) Lamborghini	Huracán GT3 Evo			14		0
	(Italy) Lamborghini	Huracán GT3 Evo			26		0
Pos.	Manufacturer	Car	BAT (Australia)	IND (United States)	SPA (Belgium)	KYA (South Africa)	Points

== See also ==
- 2020 GT World Challenge Europe
- 2020 GT World Challenge Europe Sprint Cup
- 2020 GT World Challenge Europe Endurance Cup
- 2020 GT World Challenge Asia
- 2020 GT World Challenge America
