= 2020 Bathurst 12 Hour =

2020 endurance motor race

(Australia) 2020 Bathurst 12 Hour
Event Information
- Round 1 of 4 in the 2020
- Date: 31 January – 2 February 2020
- Location: Bathurst, New South Wales, Australia
- Venue: Mount Panorama Circuit

Results
Race 1
Distance	314 laps	1950.882 km
Pole position	(Australia) Matthew Campbell; Absolute Racing	2:03.5554
Winner	(France) Jules Gounon (South Africa) Jordan Pepper (Belgium) Maxime Soulet; M-Sport	12:00:33.8710

The 2020 Liqui-Moly Bathurst 12 Hour was an endurance motor race which was staged at the Mount Panorama Circuit near Bathurst, in New South Wales, Australia on 2 February 2020. The race, which was promoted and organised by V8 Supercars Australia Pty Ltd., was open to GT3 cars, GT4 cars, Lamborghini Super Trofeo cars and Invitational vehicles. It was the 18th running of the Bathurst 12 Hour, and the opening round of both the 2020 Intercontinental GT Challenge and the 2020 Australian Endurance Championship. 39 cars were entered and 34 cars started, with five entries withdrawn following crashes in practice & qualifying.

The race was won by Jules Gounon, Jordan Pepper and Maxime Soulet driving a Bentley Continental GT3 entered by M-Sport.

== Class structure ==
Cars were classified into the following four classes.

- Class A – GT3 Outright
  - (GT3 Pro)
  - (GT3 Pro-Am)
  - (GT3 Silver)
- Class B - Lamborghini Super Trofeo cars (no entries received)
- Class C – GT4
- Class I – Invitational

== Entry list ==
Team	Car	No.	Drivers	Class
(New Zealand) Earl Bamber Motorsport	Porsche 911 GT3 R	1	(New Zealand) Earl Bamber	AP
(New Zealand) Earl Bamber Motorsport	Porsche 911 GT3 R	1	(Australia) Craig Lowndes	AP
(New Zealand) Earl Bamber Motorsport	Porsche 911 GT3 R	1	(Belgium) Laurens Vanthoor	AP
(Australia) Melbourne Performance Centre	Audi R8 LMS Evo	2	(Germany) Christopher Haase	AP
(Australia) Melbourne Performance Centre	Audi R8 LMS Evo	2	(Belgium) Dries Vanthoor	AP
(Australia) Melbourne Performance Centre	Audi R8 LMS Evo	2	(Belgium) Frédéric Vervisch	AP
(Australia) Grove Racing	Porsche 911 GT3 R	4	(United Kingdom) Ben Barker	APA
(Australia) Grove Racing	Porsche 911 GT3 R	4	(Australia) Brenton Grove	APA
(Australia) Grove Racing	Porsche 911 GT3 R	4	(Australia) Stephen Grove	APA
(Australia) Wall Racing	Lamborghini Huracán GT3 Evo	6	(Australia) Adrian Deitz	AS
(Australia) Wall Racing	Lamborghini Huracán GT3 Evo	6	(Australia) Tony D'Alberto	AS
(Australia) Wall Racing	Lamborghini Huracán GT3 Evo	6	(Australia) Cameron McConville	AS
(Australia) Wall Racing	Lamborghini Huracán GT3 Evo	6	(United Kingdom) Jules Westwood	AS
(United Kingdom) M-Sport	Bentley Continental GT3	7	(France) Jules Gounon	AP
(United Kingdom) M-Sport	Bentley Continental GT3	7	(South Africa) Jordan Pepper	AP
(United Kingdom) M-Sport	Bentley Continental GT3	7	(Belgium) Maxime Soulet	AP
(United Kingdom) M-Sport	Bentley Continental GT3	8	(United Kingdom) Alex Buncombe	AP
(United Kingdom) M-Sport	Bentley Continental GT3	8	(United Kingdom) Oliver Jarvis	AP
(United Kingdom) M-Sport	Bentley Continental GT3	8	(United Kingdom) Seb Morris	AP
(Australia) Hallmarc Racing	Audi R8 LMS Evo	9	(Australia) Marc Cini	APA
(Australia) Hallmarc Racing	Audi R8 LMS Evo	9	(Australia) Dean Fiore	APA
(Australia) Hallmarc Racing	Audi R8 LMS Evo	9	(Australia) Lee Holdsworth	APA
(New Zealand) Earl Bamber Motorsport	Porsche 911 GT3 R	12	(Australia) David Calvert-Jones	APA
(New Zealand) Earl Bamber Motorsport	Porsche 911 GT3 R	12	(France) Romain Dumas	APA
(New Zealand) Earl Bamber Motorsport	Porsche 911 GT3 R	12	(New Zealand) Jaxon Evans	APA
(United States) RHC Jorgensen-Strom	BMW M4 GT4	13	(Netherlands) Danny van Dongen	C
(United States) RHC Jorgensen-Strom	BMW M4 GT4	13	(United States) Daren Jorgensen	C
(United States) RHC Jorgensen-Strom	BMW M4 GT4	13	(United States) Brett Strom	C
(Hong Kong) KCMG	Nissan GT-R Nismo GT3 (2018)	18	(Switzerland) Alexandre Imperatori	AP
(Hong Kong) KCMG	Nissan GT-R Nismo GT3 (2018)	18	(Italy) Edoardo Liberati	AP
(Hong Kong) KCMG	Nissan GT-R Nismo GT3 (2018)	18	(Brazil) João Paulo de Oliveira	AP
(Canada) Multimatic Motorsports / (Australia) Nineteen Corporation	Mercedes-AMG GT4	19	(Australia) Mark Griffith	C
(Canada) Multimatic Motorsports / (Australia) Nineteen Corporation	Mercedes-AMG GT4	19	(Germany) Dirk Müller	C
(Canada) Multimatic Motorsports / (Australia) Nineteen Corporation	Mercedes-AMG GT4	19	(United Kingdom) Harrison Newey	C
(Australia) T2 Racing	MARC II V8	20	(Australia) Adam Hargraves	I
(Australia) T2 Racing	MARC II V8	20	(New Zealand) Daniel Jilesen	I
(Australia) T2 Racing	MARC II V8	20	(Australia) Steve Owen	I
(Australia) T2 Racing	MARC II V8	20	(Monaco) Cédric Sbirrazzuoli	I
(Australia) Melbourne Performance Centre	Audi R8 LMS Evo	22	(Italy) Mirko Bortolotti	AP
(Australia) Melbourne Performance Centre	Audi R8 LMS Evo	22	(Germany) Christopher Mies	AP
(Australia) Melbourne Performance Centre	Audi R8 LMS Evo	22	(Australia) Garth Tander	AP
(Australia) Tony Bates Racing	Audi R8 LMS Evo	24	(Australia) Tony Bates	AS
(Australia) Tony Bates Racing	Audi R8 LMS Evo	24	(Australia) Geoff Emery	AS
(Australia) Tony Bates Racing	Audi R8 LMS Evo	24	(Australia) Dylan O'Keeffe	AS
(Australia) Tony Bates Racing	Audi R8 LMS Evo	24	(Australia) Max Twigg	AS
(Taiwan) HubAuto Corsa	Ferrari 488 GT3	27	(Brazil) Marcos Gomes	AP
(Taiwan) HubAuto Corsa	Ferrari 488 GT3	27	(Brazil) Daniel Serra	AP
(Taiwan) HubAuto Corsa	Ferrari 488 GT3	27	(Australia) Tim Slade	AP
(Australia) Trofeo Motorsport	Lamborghini Huracán GT3	29	(Australia) Dean Canto	AS
(Australia) Trofeo Motorsport	Lamborghini Huracán GT3	29	(Australia) Grant Denyer	AS
(Australia) Trofeo Motorsport	Lamborghini Huracán GT3	29	(Australia) Liam Talbot	AS
(Australia) Trofeo Motorsport	Lamborghini Huracán GT3	29	(Australia) Marcel Zalloua	AS
(Italy) JAS Motorsport	Honda NSX GT3 Evo	30	(United States) Dane Cameron	AP
(Italy) JAS Motorsport	Honda NSX GT3 Evo	30	(Germany) Mario Farnbacher	AP
(Italy) JAS Motorsport	Honda NSX GT3 Evo	30	(Netherlands) Renger van der Zande	AP
(Germany) Walkenhorst Motorsport	BMW M6 GT3	34	(Netherlands) Nick Catsburg	AP
(Germany) Walkenhorst Motorsport	BMW M6 GT3	34	(Brazil) Augusto Farfus	AP
(Germany) Walkenhorst Motorsport	BMW M6 GT3	34	(Australia) Chaz Mostert	AP
(Hong Kong) KCMG	Nissan GT-R Nismo GT3 (2018)	35	(Australia) Josh Burdon	AP
(Hong Kong) KCMG	Nissan GT-R Nismo GT3 (2018)	35	(Japan) Katsumasa Chiyo	AP
(Hong Kong) KCMG	Nissan GT-R Nismo GT3 (2018)	35	(Japan) Tsugio Matsuda	AP
(Germany) Black Falcon	Mercedes-AMG GT3	46	(Russia) Sergey Afanasyev	AS
(Germany) Black Falcon	Mercedes-AMG GT3	46	(Germany) Patrick Assenheimer	AS
(Germany) Black Falcon	Mercedes-AMG GT3	46	(Italy) Michele Beretta	AS
(Australia) 59Racing	McLaren 720S GT3	59	(Croatia) Martin Kodrić	AS
(Australia) 59Racing	McLaren 720S GT3	59	(Australia) Fraser Ross	AS
(Australia) 59Racing	McLaren 720S GT3	59	(New Zealand) Dominic Storey	AS
(Australia) 59Racing	McLaren 720S GT3	60	(United Kingdom) Ben Barnicoat	AP
(Australia) 59Racing	McLaren 720S GT3	60	(Sweden) Tom Blomqvist	AP
(Australia) 59Racing	McLaren 720S GT3	60	(Portugal) Álvaro Parente	AP
(Switzerland) R-Motorsport	Aston Martin Vantage AMR GT3	62	(United Kingdom) Oliver Caldwell	AP
(Switzerland) R-Motorsport	Aston Martin Vantage AMR GT3	62	(Italy) Luca Ghiotto	AP
(Switzerland) R-Motorsport	Aston Martin Vantage AMR GT3	62	(Germany) Marvin Kirchhöfer	AP
(China) FFF Racing Team	Lamborghini Huracán GT3 Evo	63	(Italy) Andrea Caldarelli	AP
(China) FFF Racing Team	Lamborghini Huracán GT3 Evo	63	(Denmark) Dennis Lind	AP
(China) FFF Racing Team	Lamborghini Huracán GT3 Evo	63	(Italy) Marco Mapelli	AP
(Australia) SunEnergy1 Racing	Mercedes-AMG GT3	75	(Austria) Dominik Baumann	APA
(Australia) SunEnergy1 Racing	Mercedes-AMG GT3	75	(Australia) Kenny Habul	APA
(Australia) SunEnergy1 Racing	Mercedes-AMG GT3	75	(Austria) Martin Konrad	APA
(Australia) SunEnergy1 Racing	Mercedes-AMG GT3	75	(Australia) David Reynolds	APA
(Switzerland) R-Motorsport	Aston Martin Vantage AMR GT3	76	(United Kingdom) Jake Dennis	AP
(Switzerland) R-Motorsport	Aston Martin Vantage AMR GT3	76	(New Zealand) Scott Dixon	AP
(Switzerland) R-Motorsport	Aston Martin Vantage AMR GT3	76	(Australia) Rick Kelly	AP
(Hong Kong) Craft-Bamboo Racing	Mercedes-AMG GT3 Evo	77	(Netherlands) Yelmer Buurman	AP
(Hong Kong) Craft-Bamboo Racing	Mercedes-AMG GT3 Evo	77	(Germany) Maro Engel	AP
(Hong Kong) Craft-Bamboo Racing	Mercedes-AMG GT3 Evo	77	(Germany) Luca Stolz	AP
MARC Cars Australia	MARC II V8	91	(Australia) Aaron Cameron	I
MARC Cars Australia	MARC II V8	91	(Australia) Nick Percat	I
MARC Cars Australia	MARC II V8	91	(Australia) Broc Feeney	I
MARC Cars Australia	MARC II V8	92	(Australia) Tyler Everingham	I
MARC Cars Australia	MARC II V8	92	(United Kingdom) James Kaye	I
MARC Cars Australia	MARC II V8	92	(Australia) Hadrian Morrall	I
(Australia) GJ Motorsport	MARC II V8	95	(Australia) Bayley Hall	I
(Australia) GJ Motorsport	MARC II V8	95	(Australia) Warren Luff	I
(Australia) GJ Motorsport	MARC II V8	95	(Australia) Brad Schumacher	I
(Australia) GJ Motorsport	MARC II V8	95	(Australia) Geoff Taunton	I
(Australia) Hobson Motorsport	Nissan GT-R Nismo GT3 (2015)	96	(Australia) Brett Hobson	AS
(Australia) Hobson Motorsport	Nissan GT-R Nismo GT3 (2015)	96	(Australia) Kurt Kostecki	AS
(Australia) Hobson Motorsport	Nissan GT-R Nismo GT3 (2015)	96	(Australia) Garth Walden	AS
(United Kingdom) Garage 59	Aston Martin Vantage AMR GT3	159	(Canada) Roman De Angelis	AS
(United Kingdom) Garage 59	Aston Martin Vantage AMR GT3	159	(Netherlands) Olivier Hart	AS
(United Kingdom) Garage 59	Aston Martin Vantage AMR GT3	159	(United Kingdom) Andrew Watson	AS
(United Kingdom) Garage 59	Aston Martin Vantage AMR GT3	188	(United Kingdom) Chris Goodwin	APA
(United Kingdom) Garage 59	Aston Martin Vantage AMR GT3	188	(France) Côme Ledogar	APA
(United Kingdom) Garage 59	Aston Martin Vantage AMR GT3	188	(Belgium) Maxime Martin	APA
(United Kingdom) Garage 59	Aston Martin Vantage AMR GT3	188	(Sweden) Alexander West	APA
(Australia) Melbourne Performance Centre	Audi R8 LMS Evo	222	(Italy) Mattia Drudi	AP
(Australia) Melbourne Performance Centre	Audi R8 LMS Evo	222	(South Africa) Kelvin van der Linde	AP
(Australia) Melbourne Performance Centre	Audi R8 LMS Evo	222	(Germany) Markus Winkelhock	AP
(Australia) Triple Eight Race Engineering	Mercedes-AMG GT3	777	(Australia) Anton de Pasquale	APA
(Australia) Triple Eight Race Engineering	Mercedes-AMG GT3	777	(Australia) Nick Foster	APA
(Australia) Triple Eight Race Engineering	Mercedes-AMG GT3	777	(Australia) Sam Shahin	APA
(Australia) Triple Eight Race Engineering	Mercedes-AMG GT3	777	(Australia) Yasser Shahin	APA
(Australia) Triple Eight Race Engineering	Mercedes-AMG GT3 Evo	888	(New Zealand) Shane van Gisbergen	AP
(Australia) Triple Eight Race Engineering	Mercedes-AMG GT3 Evo	888	(Germany) Maximilian Götz	AP
(Australia) Triple Eight Race Engineering	Mercedes-AMG GT3 Evo	888	(Australia) Jamie Whincup	AP
(China) Absolute Racing	Porsche 911 GT3 R	911	(Australia) Matt Campbell	AP
(China) Absolute Racing	Porsche 911 GT3 R	911	(France) Mathieu Jaminet	AP
(China) Absolute Racing	Porsche 911 GT3 R	911	(France) Patrick Pilet	AP
(China) Absolute Racing	Porsche 911 GT3 R	912	(Italy) Matteo Cairoli	AP
(China) Absolute Racing	Porsche 911 GT3 R	912	(Austria) Thomas Preining	AP
(China) Absolute Racing	Porsche 911 GT3 R	912	(Germany) Dirk Werner	AP
(Hong Kong) GruppeM Racing	Mercedes-AMG GT3 Evo	999	(Germany) Maximilian Buhk	AP
(Hong Kong) GruppeM Racing	Mercedes-AMG GT3 Evo	999	(Brazil) Felipe Fraga	AP
(Hong Kong) GruppeM Racing	Mercedes-AMG GT3 Evo	999	(Switzerland) Raffaele Marciello	AP

== Results ==
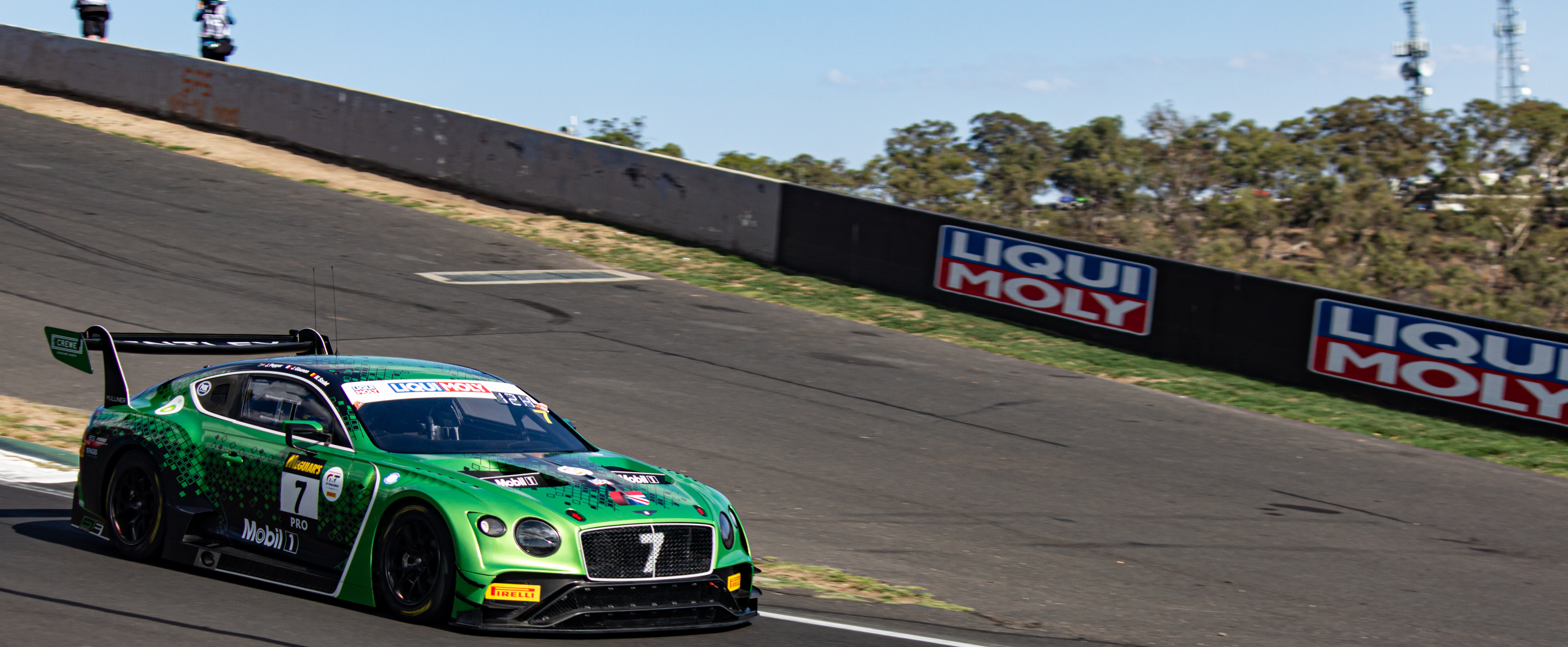
The winning Bentley Continental GT3

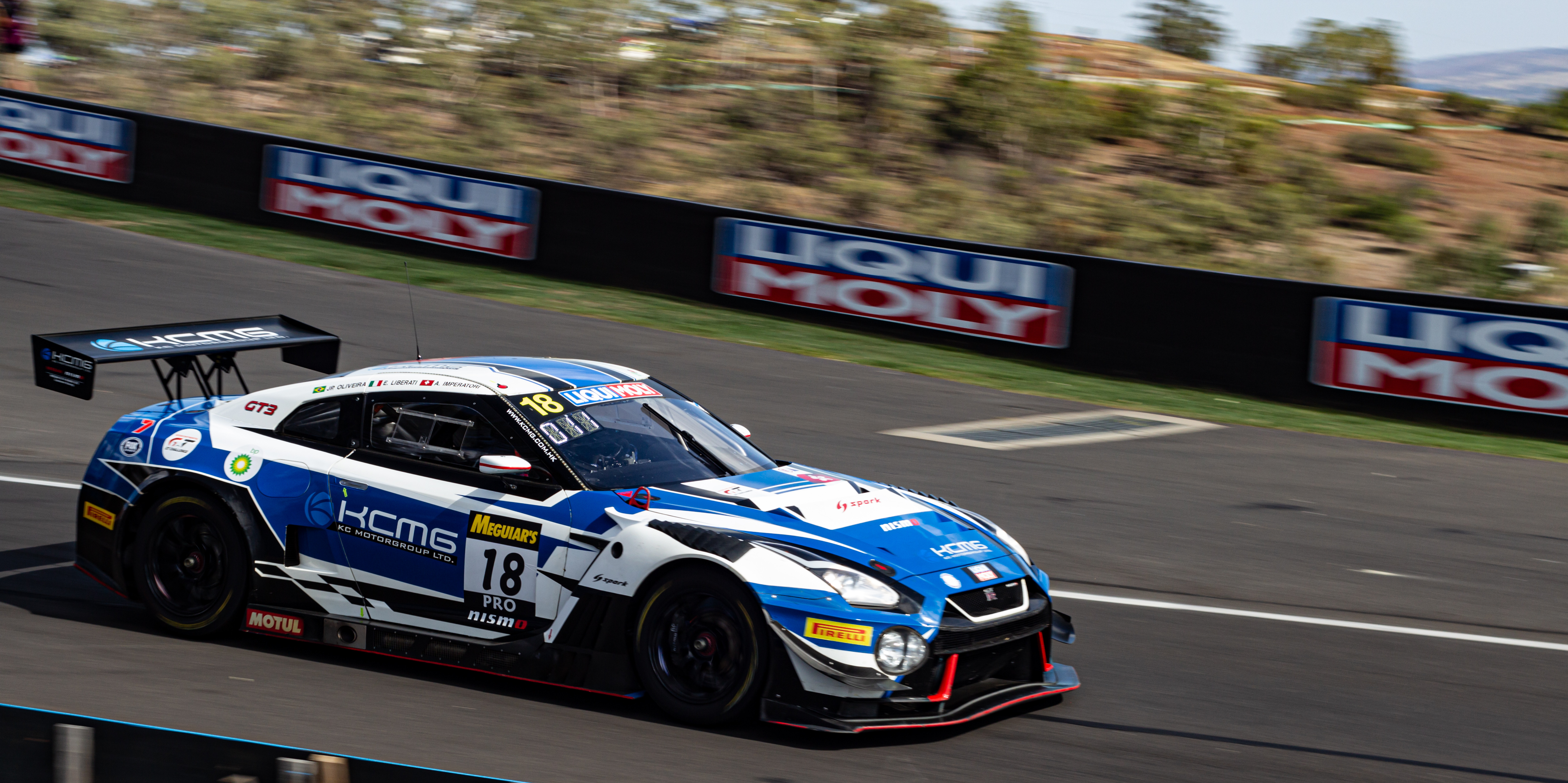
The 2018 model Nissan GT-R Nismo GT3 entry of KCMG was driven by Edoardo Liberati, Alex Imperatori and João Paulo de Oliveira.

=== Qualifying ===
Pos.	No.	Class	Driver	Team	Car	Time	Gap
1	911	P	(Australia) Matt Campbell	(China) Absolute Racing	Porsche 911 GT3 R	2:03.4336	
2	77	P	(Germany) Maro Engel	(Hong Kong) Craft-Bamboo Racing	Mercedes-AMG GT3 Evo	2:03.5361	+0.1025
3	60	P	(Portugal) Álvaro Parente	(Australia) 59Racing	McLaren 720S GT3	2:03.6021	+0.1685
4	999	P	(Switzerland) Raffaele Marciello	(Hong Kong) GruppeM Racing	Mercedes-AMG GT3 Evo	2:03.6431	+0.2095
5	1	P	(Belgium) Laurens Vanthoor	(New Zealand) Earl Bamber Motorsport	Porsche 911 GT3 R	2:03.6832	+0.2496
6	222	P	(South Africa) Kelvin van der Linde	(Australia) Melbourne Performance Centre	Audi R8 LMS Evo	2:03.6858	+0.2522
7	18	P	(Brazil) João Paulo de Oliveira	(Hong Kong) KCMG	Nissan GT-R Nismo GT3 (2018)	2:03.7150	+0.2814
8	76	P	(United Kingdom) Jake Dennis	(Switzerland) R-Motorsport	Aston Martin Vantage AMR GT3	2:03.7539	+0.3203
9	63	P	(Italy) Marco Mapelli	(China) FFF Racing Team	Lamborghini Huracán GT3 Evo	2:03.9407	+0.5071
10	888	P	(New Zealand) Shane van Gisbergen	(Australia) Triple Eight Race Engineering	Mercedes-AMG GT3 Evo	2:03.9882	+0.5546
11	7	P	(France) Jules Gounon	(United Kingdom) M-Sport	Bentley Continental GT3	2:04.1107	+0.6771
12	912	P	(Italy) Matteo Cairoli	(China) Absolute Racing	Porsche 911 GT3 R	2:04.2267	+0.7931
13	75	PA	(Australia) David Reynolds	(Australia) SunEnergy1 Racing	Mercedes-AMG GT3	2:04.2711	+0.8375
14	2	P	(Belgium) Dries Vanthoor	(Australia) Melbourne Performance Centre	Audi R8 LMS Evo	2:04.2742	+0.8406
15	34	P	(Australia) Chaz Mostert	(Germany) Walkenhorst Motorsport	BMW M6 GT3	2:04.3096	+0.8760
16	4	PA	(United Kingdom) Ben Barker	(Australia) Grove Racing	Porsche 911 GT3 R	2:04.3591	+0.9255
17	59	S	(New Zealand) Dominic Storey	(Australia) 59Racing	McLaren 720S GT3	2:04.3883	+0.9547
18	188	PA	(France) Côme Ledogar	(United Kingdom) Garage 59	Aston Martin Vantage AMR GT3	2:04.4248	+0.9912
19	22	P	(Germany) Christopher Mies	(Australia) Melbourne Performance Centre	Audi R8 LMS Evo	2:04.5434	+1.1098
20	159	S	(United Kingdom) Andrew Watson	(United Kingdom) Garage 59	Aston Martin Vantage AMR GT3	2:04.6088	+1.1752
21	46	S	(Germany) Patrick Assenheimer	(Germany) Black Falcon	Mercedes-AMG GT3	2:04.6515	+1.2179
22	9	PA	(Australia) Lee Holdsworth	(Australia) Hallmarc Racing	Audi R8 LMS Evo	2:04.6804	+1.2468
23	62	P	(Germany) Marvin Kirchhöfer	(Switzerland) R-Motorsport	Aston Martin Vantage AMR GT3	2:04.7039	+1.2703
24	30	P	(Netherlands) Renger van der Zande	(Italy) JAS Motorsport	Honda NSX GT3 Evo	2:04.7948	+1.3612
25	12	PA	(France) Romain Dumas	(New Zealand) Earl Bamber Motorsport	Porsche 911 GT3 R	2:05.3877	+1.9541
26	29	PA	(Australia) Dean Canto	(Australia) Trofeo Motorsport	Lamborghini Huracán GT3	2:05.4162	+1.9826
27	6	S	(Australia) Cameron McConville	(Australia) Wall Racing	Lamborghini Huracán GT3 Evo	2:05.4408	+2.0072
28	91	INV	(Australia) Nick Percat	MARC Cars Australia	MARC II V8	2:05.5375	+2.1039
29	24	S	(Australia) Dylan O'Keeffe	(Australia) Tony Bates Racing	Audi R8 LMS Evo	2:05.9268	+2.4932
30	95	INV	(Australia) Warren Luff	(Australia) GJ Motorsport	MARC II V8	2:05.9928	+2.5592
31	96	S	(Australia) Kurt Kostecki	(Australia) Hobson Motorsport	Nissan GT-R Nismo GT3 (2015)	2:07.2753	+3.8417
32	20	INV	(Australia) Steve Owen	(Australia) T2 Racing	MARC II V8	2:07.3434	+3.9098
33	92	INV	(Australia) Tyler Everingham	MARC Cars Australia	MARC II V8	2:08.5309	+5.0973
34	777	PA	(Australia) Sam Shahin	(Australia) Triple Eight Race Engineering	Mercedes-AMG GT3	2:09.6731	+6.2395
35	13	GT4	(United States) Brett Strom	(United States) RHC Jorgensen-Strom	BMW M4 GT4	2:16.8128	+13.3792
36	19	GT4	(Germany) Dirk Müller	(Canada) Multimatic Motorsports / (Australia) Nineteen Corporation	Mercedes-AMG GT4	2:17.4249	+13.9913
NC	8	P	(United Kingdom) Oliver Jarvis	(United Kingdom) M-Sport	Bentley Continental GT3	No time	
WD	27	P	(Brazil) Daniel Serra	(Taiwan) HubAuto Corsa	Ferrari 488 GT3	Withdrawn	
WD	35	P	(Japan) Katsumasa Chiyo	(Hong Kong) KCMG	Nissan GT-R Nismo GT3 (2018)	Withdrawn	

=== Top 10 shootout ===
Pos.	No.	Driver	Team	Car	Time	Gap
1	911	(Australia) Matt Campbell	(China) Absolute Racing	Porsche 911 GT3 R	2:03.5554	
2	60	(Portugal) Álvaro Parente	(Australia) 59Racing	McLaren 720S GT3	2:03.7802	+0.2248
3	999	(Italy) Raffaele Marciello	(Hong Kong) GruppeM Racing	Mercedes-AMG GT3 Evo	2:03.8219	+0.2665
4	18	(Brazil) João Paulo de Oliveira	(Hong Kong) KCMG	Nissan GT-R Nismo GT3 (2018)	2:03.9403	+0.3849
5	1	(Belgium) Laurens Vanthoor	(New Zealand) Earl Bamber Motorsport	Porsche 911 GT3 R	2:03.9829	+0.4275
6	77	(Germany) Maro Engel	(Hong Kong) Craft-Bamboo Racing	Mercedes-AMG GT3 Evo	2:04.0769	+0.5215
7	222	(South Africa) Kelvin van der Linde	(Australia) Melbourne Performance Centre	Audi R8 LMS Evo	2:04.3442	+0.7888
8	888	(New Zealand) Shane van Gisbergen	(Australia) Triple Eight Race Engineering	Mercedes-AMG GT3 Evo	2:04.3560	+0.8006
9	63	(Italy) Marco Mapelli	(China) FFF Racing Team	Lamborghini Huracán GT3 Evo	2:04.5014	+0.9460
10	76	(United Kingdom) Jake Dennis	(Switzerland) R-Motorsport	Aston Martin Vantage AMR GT3	2:04.7524	+1.1970

=== Race ===
Pos.	Class	No.	Team / Entrant	Drivers	Car	Laps	Time/Retired
Pos.	Class	No.	Team / Entrant	Drivers	Engine	Laps	Time/Retired
1	P	7	(United Kingdom) M-Sport	(France) Jules Gounon (South Africa) Jordan Pepper (Belgium) Maxime Soulet	Bentley Continental GT3	314	12:00:33.8710
1	P	7	(United Kingdom) M-Sport	(France) Jules Gounon (South Africa) Jordan Pepper (Belgium) Maxime Soulet	Bentley EA824 4.0 L Turbo V8	314	12:00:33.8710
2	P	60	(Australia) 59Racing	(United Kingdom) Ben Barnicoat (Sweden) Tom Blomqvist (Portugal) Álvaro Parente	McLaren 720S GT3	314	+41.524
2	P	60	(Australia) 59Racing	(United Kingdom) Ben Barnicoat (Sweden) Tom Blomqvist (Portugal) Álvaro Parente	McLaren M840T 4.0 L Turbo V8	314	+41.524
3	P	888	(Australia) Triple Eight Race Engineering	(New Zealand) Shane van Gisbergen (Germany) Maximilian Götz (Australia) Jamie Whincup	Mercedes-AMG GT3 Evo	314	+44.460
3	P	888	(Australia) Triple Eight Race Engineering	(New Zealand) Shane van Gisbergen (Germany) Maximilian Götz (Australia) Jamie Whincup	Mercedes-AMG M159 6.2 L V8	314	+44.460
4	P	911	(China) Absolute Racing	(Australia) Matt Campbell (France) Mathieu Jaminet (France) Patrick Pilet	Porsche 911 GT3 R	314	+45.990
4	P	911	(China) Absolute Racing	(Australia) Matt Campbell (France) Mathieu Jaminet (France) Patrick Pilet	Porsche 4.0 L Flat-6	314	+45.990
5	P	77	(Hong Kong) Craft-Bamboo Racing	(Netherlands) Yelmer Buurman (Germany) Maro Engel (Germany) Luca Stolz	Mercedes-AMG GT3 Evo	314	+1:03.039
5	P	77	(Hong Kong) Craft-Bamboo Racing	(Netherlands) Yelmer Buurman (Germany) Maro Engel (Germany) Luca Stolz	Mercedes-AMG M159 6.2 L V8	314	+1:03.039
6	P	999	(Hong Kong) GruppeM Racing	(Germany) Maximilian Buhk (Brazil) Felipe Fraga (Switzerland) Raffaele Marciello	Mercedes-AMG GT3 Evo	314	+1:07.794^{1}
6	P	999	(Hong Kong) GruppeM Racing	(Germany) Maximilian Buhk (Brazil) Felipe Fraga (Switzerland) Raffaele Marciello	Mercedes-AMG M159 6.2 L V8	314	+1:07.794^{1}
7	P	912	(China) Absolute Racing	(Italy) Matteo Cairoli (Austria) Thomas Preining (Germany) Dirk Werner	Porsche 911 GT3 R	314	+1:36.097
7	P	912	(China) Absolute Racing	(Italy) Matteo Cairoli (Austria) Thomas Preining (Germany) Dirk Werner	Porsche 4.0 L Flat-6	314	+1:36.097
8	S	59	(Australia) 59Racing	(Croatia) Martin Kodrić (Australia) Fraser Ross (New Zealand) Dominic Storey	McLaren 720S GT3	313	+1 lap
8	S	59	(Australia) 59Racing	(Croatia) Martin Kodrić (Australia) Fraser Ross (New Zealand) Dominic Storey	McLaren M840T 4.0 L Turbo V8	313	+1 lap
9	P	1	(New Zealand) Earl Bamber Motorsport	(New Zealand) Earl Bamber (Australia) Craig Lowndes (Belgium) Laurens Vanthoor	Porsche 911 GT3 R	312	+2 laps
9	P	1	(New Zealand) Earl Bamber Motorsport	(New Zealand) Earl Bamber (Australia) Craig Lowndes (Belgium) Laurens Vanthoor	Porsche 4.0 L Flat-6	312	+2 laps
10	PA	4	(Australia) Grove Racing	(United Kingdom) Ben Barker (Australia) Brenton Grove (Australia) Stephen Grove	Porsche 911 GT3 R	312	+2 laps
10	PA	4	(Australia) Grove Racing	(United Kingdom) Ben Barker (Australia) Brenton Grove (Australia) Stephen Grove	Porsche 4.0 L Flat-6	312	+2 laps
11	PA	12	(New Zealand) Earl Bamber Motorsport	(Australia) David Calvert-Jones (France) Romain Dumas (New Zealand) Jaxon Evans	Porsche 911 GT3 R	311	+3 laps
11	PA	12	(New Zealand) Earl Bamber Motorsport	(Australia) David Calvert-Jones (France) Romain Dumas (New Zealand) Jaxon Evans	Porsche 4.0 L Flat-6	311	+3 laps
12	P	18	(Hong Kong) KCMG	(Switzerland) Alexandre Imperatori (Italy) Edoardo Liberati (Brazil) João Paulo de Oliveira	Nissan GT-R Nismo GT3 (2018)	311	+3 laps
12	P	18	(Hong Kong) KCMG	(Switzerland) Alexandre Imperatori (Italy) Edoardo Liberati (Brazil) João Paulo de Oliveira	Nissan VR38DETT 3.8 L Turbo V6	311	+3 laps
13	S	159	(United Kingdom) Garage 59	(Canada) Roman De Angelis (Netherlands) Olivier Hart (United Kingdom) Andrew Watson	Aston Martin Vantage AMR GT3	311	+3 laps
13	S	159	(United Kingdom) Garage 59	(Canada) Roman De Angelis (Netherlands) Olivier Hart (United Kingdom) Andrew Watson	Aston Martin M177 4.0 L Turbo V8	311	+3 laps
14	S	46	(Germany) Black Falcon	(Russia) Sergey Afanasyev (Germany) Patrick Assenheimer (Italy) Michele Beretta	Mercedes-AMG GT3	311	+3 laps^{2}
14	S	46	(Germany) Black Falcon	(Russia) Sergey Afanasyev (Germany) Patrick Assenheimer (Italy) Michele Beretta	Mercedes-AMG M159 6.2 L V8	311	+3 laps^{2}
15	INV	91	MARC Cars Australia	(Australia) Aaron Cameron (Australia) Nick Percat (Australia) Broc Feeney	MARC II V8	310	+4 laps
15	INV	91	MARC Cars Australia	(Australia) Aaron Cameron (Australia) Nick Percat (Australia) Broc Feeney	Ford Modular 5.2 L V8	310	+4 laps
16	P	76	(Switzerland) R-Motorsport	(United Kingdom) Jake Dennis (New Zealand) Scott Dixon (Australia) Rick Kelly	Aston Martin Vantage AMR GT3	308	+6 laps
16	P	76	(Switzerland) R-Motorsport	(United Kingdom) Jake Dennis (New Zealand) Scott Dixon (Australia) Rick Kelly	Aston Martin M177 4.0 L Turbo V8	308	+6 laps
17	PA	9	(Australia) Hallmarc Racing	(Australia) Marc Cini (Australia) Dean Fiore (Australia) Lee Holdsworth	Audi R8 LMS Evo	308	+6 laps
17	PA	9	(Australia) Hallmarc Racing	(Australia) Marc Cini (Australia) Dean Fiore (Australia) Lee Holdsworth	Audi DAR 5.2 L V10	308	+6 laps
18	P	222	(Australia) Melbourne Performance Centre	(Italy) Mattia Drudi (South Africa) Kelvin van der Linde (Germany) Markus Winkelhock	Audi R8 LMS Evo	308	+6 laps
18	P	222	(Australia) Melbourne Performance Centre	(Italy) Mattia Drudi (South Africa) Kelvin van der Linde (Germany) Markus Winkelhock	Audi DAR 5.2 L V10	308	+6 laps
19	S	29	(Australia) Trofeo Motorsport	(Australia) Dean Canto (Australia) Grant Denyer (Australia) Liam Talbot (Australia) Marcel Zalloua	Lamborghini Huracán GT3	300	+14 laps
19	S	29	(Australia) Trofeo Motorsport	(Australia) Dean Canto (Australia) Grant Denyer (Australia) Liam Talbot (Australia) Marcel Zalloua	Lamborghini DGF 5.2 L V10	300	+14 laps
20	PA	75	(Australia) SunEnergy1 Racing	(Austria) Dominik Baumann (Australia) Kenny Habul (Austria) Martin Konrad (Australia) David Reynolds	Mercedes-AMG GT3	290	+24 laps
20	PA	75	(Australia) SunEnergy1 Racing	(Austria) Dominik Baumann (Australia) Kenny Habul (Austria) Martin Konrad (Australia) David Reynolds	Mercedes-AMG M159 6.2 L V8	290	+24 laps
21	S	96	(Australia) Hobson Motorsport	(Australia) Brett Hobson (Australia) Kurt Kostecki (Australia) Garth Walden	Nissan GT-R Nismo GT3 (2018)	288	+26 laps
21	S	96	(Australia) Hobson Motorsport	(Australia) Brett Hobson (Australia) Kurt Kostecki (Australia) Garth Walden	Nissan VR38DETT 3.8 L Turbo V6	288	+26 laps
22	GT4	13	(United States) RHC Jorgensen-Strom	(Netherlands) Danny van Dongen (United States) Daren Jorgensen (United States) Brett Strom	BMW M4 GT4	277	+37 laps
22	GT4	13	(United States) RHC Jorgensen-Strom	(Netherlands) Danny van Dongen (United States) Daren Jorgensen (United States) Brett Strom	BMW N55 3.0 L Turbo I6	277	+37 laps
23	GT4	19	(Canada) Multimatic Motorsports / (Australia) Nineteen Corporation	(Australia) Mark Griffith (Germany) Dirk Müller (United Kingdom) Harrison Newey	Mercedes-AMG GT4	270	+44 laps
23	GT4	19	(Canada) Multimatic Motorsports / (Australia) Nineteen Corporation	(Australia) Mark Griffith (Germany) Dirk Müller (United Kingdom) Harrison Newey	Mercedes-AMG M178 4.0 L Turbo V8	270	+44 laps
DNF	P	8	(United Kingdom) M-Sport	(United Kingdom) Alex Buncombe (United Kingdom) Oliver Jarvis (United Kingdom) Seb Morris	Bentley Continental GT3	225	Puncture
DNF	P	8	(United Kingdom) M-Sport	(United Kingdom) Alex Buncombe (United Kingdom) Oliver Jarvis (United Kingdom) Seb Morris	Bentley EA824 4.0 L Turbo V8	225	Puncture
NC	INV	20	(Australia) T2 Racing	(Australia) Adam Hargraves (New Zealand) Daniel Jilesen (Australia) Steve Owen (Monaco) Cédric Sbirrazzuoli	MARC II V8	203	Not Classified^{3}
NC	INV	20	(Australia) T2 Racing	(Australia) Adam Hargraves (New Zealand) Daniel Jilesen (Australia) Steve Owen (Monaco) Cédric Sbirrazzuoli	Ford Modular 5.2 L V8	203	Not Classified^{3}
DNF	P	63	(China) FFF Racing Team	(Italy) Andrea Caldarelli (Denmark) Dennis Lind (Italy) Marco Mapelli	Lamborghini Huracán GT3 Evo	187	Fuel pump
DNF	P	63	(China) FFF Racing Team	(Italy) Andrea Caldarelli (Denmark) Dennis Lind (Italy) Marco Mapelli	Lamborghini DGF 5.2 L V10	187	Fuel pump
DNF	P	30	(Italy) JAS Motorsport	(United States) Dane Cameron (Germany) Mario Farnbacher (Netherlands) Renger van der Zande	Honda NSX GT3 Evo	184	Electrical
DNF	P	30	(Italy) JAS Motorsport	(United States) Dane Cameron (Germany) Mario Farnbacher (Netherlands) Renger van der Zande	Honda JNC1 3.5 L Turbo V6	184	Electrical
NC	INV	95	(Australia) GJ Motorsport	(Australia) Bayley Hall (Australia) Warren Luff (Australia) Brad Schumacher (Australia) Geoff Taunton	MARC II V8	167	Not Classified^{3}
NC	INV	95	(Australia) GJ Motorsport	(Australia) Bayley Hall (Australia) Warren Luff (Australia) Brad Schumacher (Australia) Geoff Taunton	Ford Modular 5.2 L V8	167	Not Classified^{3}
DNF	P	34	(Germany) Walkenhorst Motorsport	(Netherlands) Nick Catsburg (Brazil) Augusto Farfus (Australia) Chaz Mostert	BMW M6 GT3	166	Overheating
DNF	P	34	(Germany) Walkenhorst Motorsport	(Netherlands) Nick Catsburg (Brazil) Augusto Farfus (Australia) Chaz Mostert	BMW S63 4.4 L Turbo V8	166	Overheating
DNF	P	2	(Australia) Melbourne Performance Centre	(Germany) Christopher Haase (Belgium) Dries Vanthoor (Belgium) Frédéric Vervisch	Audi R8 LMS Evo	148	Camshaft sensor
DNF	P	2	(Australia) Melbourne Performance Centre	(Germany) Christopher Haase (Belgium) Dries Vanthoor (Belgium) Frédéric Vervisch	Audi DAR 5.2 L V10	148	Camshaft sensor
DNF	S	24	(Australia) Tony Bates Racing	(Australia) Tony Bates (Australia) Geoff Emery (Australia) Dylan O'Keeffe (Australia) Max Twigg	Audi R8 LMS Evo	84	Engine
DNF	S	24	(Australia) Tony Bates Racing	(Australia) Tony Bates (Australia) Geoff Emery (Australia) Dylan O'Keeffe (Australia) Max Twigg	Audi DAR 5.2 L V10	84	Engine
DNF	P	22	(Australia) Melbourne Performance Centre	(Italy) Mirko Bortolotti (Germany) Christopher Mies (Australia) Garth Tander	Audi R8 LMS Evo	61	Crash
DNF	P	22	(Australia) Melbourne Performance Centre	(Italy) Mirko Bortolotti (Germany) Christopher Mies (Australia) Garth Tander	Audi DAR 5.2 L V10	61	Crash
DNF	S	6	(Australia) Wall Racing	(Australia) Adrian Deitz (Australia) Tony D'Alberto (Australia) Cameron McConville (United Kingdom) Jules Westwood	Lamborghini Huracán GT3 Evo	43	Crash
DNF	S	6	(Australia) Wall Racing	(Australia) Adrian Deitz (Australia) Tony D'Alberto (Australia) Cameron McConville (United Kingdom) Jules Westwood	Lamborghini DGF 5.2 L V10	43	Crash
DNF	PA	188	(United Kingdom) Garage 59	(United Kingdom) Chris Goodwin (France) Côme Ledogar (Belgium) Maxime Martin (Sweden) Alexander West	Aston Martin Vantage AMR GT3	37	Crash
DNF	PA	188	(United Kingdom) Garage 59	(United Kingdom) Chris Goodwin (France) Côme Ledogar (Belgium) Maxime Martin (Sweden) Alexander West	Aston Martin M177 4.0 L Turbo V8	37	Crash
WD	P	62	(Switzerland) R-Motorsport	(United Kingdom) Oliver Caldwell (Italy) Luca Ghiotto (Germany) Marvin Kirchhöfer	Aston Martin Vantage AMR GT3		Crash in Q2
WD	P	62	(Switzerland) R-Motorsport	(United Kingdom) Oliver Caldwell (Italy) Luca Ghiotto (Germany) Marvin Kirchhöfer	Aston Martin M177 4.0 L Turbo V8		Crash in Q2
WD	INV	92	MARC Cars Australia	(Australia) Tyler Everingham (United Kingdom) James Kaye (Australia) Hadrian Morrall	MARC II V8		Crash in Q1
WD	INV	92	MARC Cars Australia	(Australia) Tyler Everingham (United Kingdom) James Kaye (Australia) Hadrian Morrall	Ford Modular 5.2 L V8		Crash in Q1
WD	PA	777	(Australia) Triple Eight Race Engineering	(Australia) Anton de Pasquale (Australia) Nick Foster (Australia) Sam Shahin (Australia) Yasser Shahin	Mercedes-AMG GT3		Crash in Q1
WD	PA	777	(Australia) Triple Eight Race Engineering	(Australia) Anton de Pasquale (Australia) Nick Foster (Australia) Sam Shahin (Australia) Yasser Shahin	Mercedes-AMG M159 6.2 L V8		Crash in Q1
WD	P	27	(Taiwan) HubAuto Corsa	(Brazil) Marcos Gomes (Brazil) Daniel Serra (Australia) Tim Slade	Ferrari 488 GT3		Crash in FP5
WD	P	27	(Taiwan) HubAuto Corsa	(Brazil) Marcos Gomes (Brazil) Daniel Serra (Australia) Tim Slade	Ferrari F154 3.9 L Turbo V8		Crash in FP5
WD	P	35	(Hong Kong) KCMG	(Australia) Josh Burdon (Japan) Katsumasa Chiyo (Japan) Tsugio Matsuda	Nissan GT-R Nismo GT3 (2018)		Crash in FP1
WD	P	35	(Hong Kong) KCMG	(Australia) Josh Burdon (Japan) Katsumasa Chiyo (Japan) Tsugio Matsuda	Nissan VR38DETT 3.8 L Turbo V6		Crash in FP1
Fastest lap set by Kelvin van der Linde on lap 305 – 2:03.2789

Notes

- ^1 – Car No. 999 received a 30 seconds post-race penalty for a pit procedure infringement.
- ^2 – Car No. 46 received a 270 seconds post-race penalty
- ^3 – Cars No. 95 and No. 20 were both running at the finish of the race, but failed to complete the minimum laps necessary to be classified.

== Australian Tourist Trophy ==
The Australian Tourist Trophy was awarded by the Confederation of Australian Motor Sport to the drivers of the outright winning car.

Intercontinental GT Challenge
Previous race: 2019 Kyalami 9 Hours	2020 season	Next race: 2020 Indianapolis 8 Hours
