= David Pittard =

British racing driver

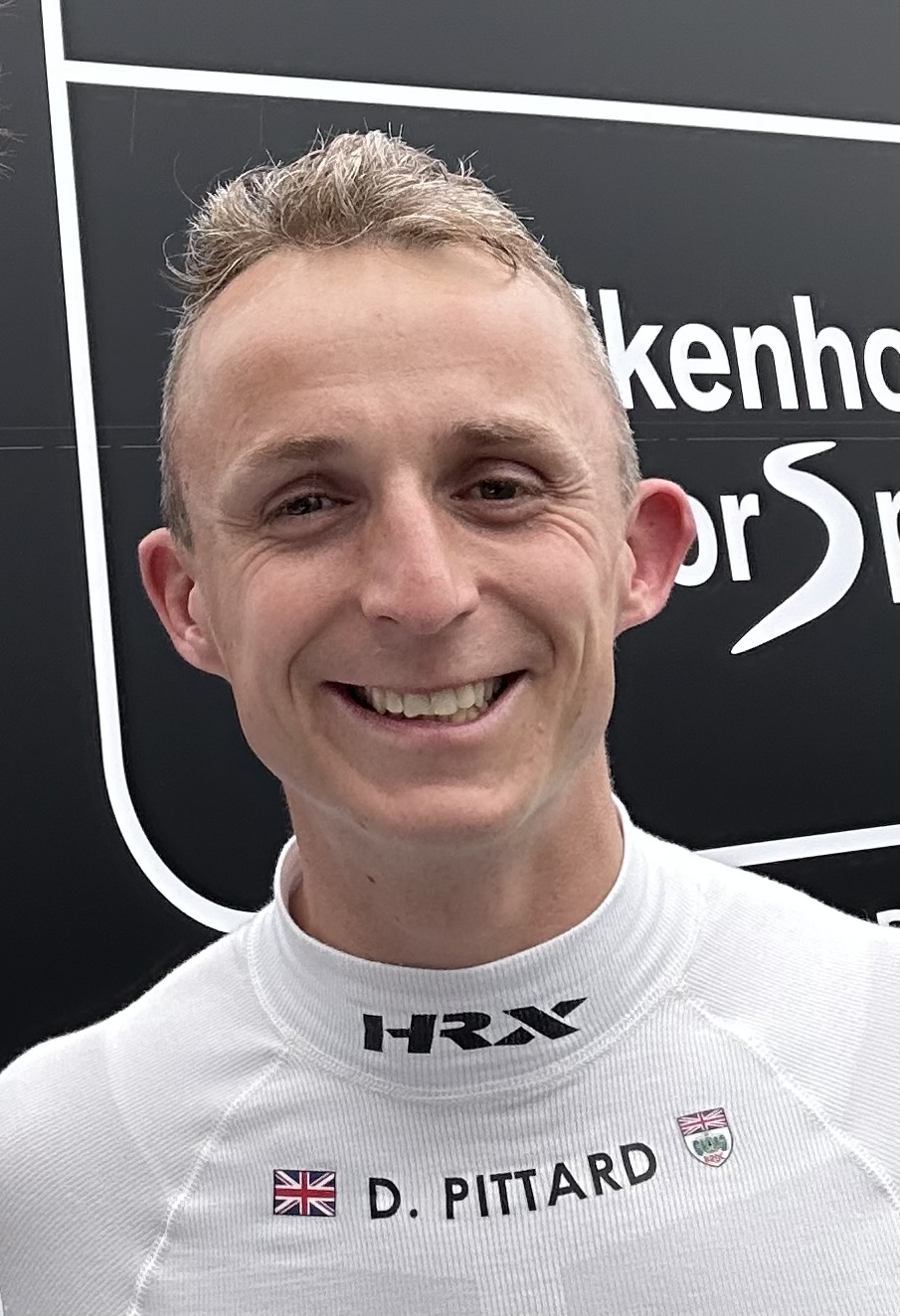
- Pittard in 2024
- Nationality: (United Kingdom) British
- Born: David Graeme Pittard; 29 January 1992 (age 34) Hertfordshire, England

IMSA SportsCar Championship career
- Debut season: 2022
- Current team: Heart of Racing Team
- Categorisation: FIA Silver (until 2022); FIA Gold (2023–)
- Car number: 23
- Former teams: Northwest AMR
- Starts: 4
- Wins: 0
- Podiums: 0
- Poles: 0
- Fastest laps: 0

Previous series
- 2013 2014–2015 2017 2019–2020: Ginetta GT5 Challenge; Ginetta GT4 Supercup; British GT Championship; Intercontinental GT Challenge
- Statistics up to date as of 4 November 2023.

David Graeme Pittard (born 29 January 1992) is a British racing driver who competes in the Nürburgring Endurance Series and IMSA SportsCar Championship. He was part of the Frikadelli Racing Team entry which won the 2023 24 Hours of Nürburgring.

== Early life ==
Pittard studied Motorsport Engineering at Brunel University.

== Career ==
=== Early career ===
Pittard began his circuit racing career in 2010, taking part in the Britain-based Toyota MR2 Racing Series, which he would return to in 2011. He would add a campaign in the BRSCC Sports 2000 Pinto Championship during the 2011 season, before taking on the Britcar Endurance Series in 2012. Ahead of the 2013 season, Pittard announced that he'd be taking part in the Ginetta GT5 Challenge. In his opening season of competition, Pittard scored his maiden victory in the first race of the weekend at Silverstone, taking two more alongside seven podiums en route to a fifth-place finish in the overall championship. Owing to his performance in the championship, Pittard was elevated to BRDC Rising Star status at season's end. Pittard moved to the Ginetta GT4 Supercup in 2014, driving for SV Racing. After claiming a podium each in the opening two weekends, Pittard took his first victory of the season at Thruxton in May. Pittard doubled up with a victory during the second race as well, elevating him to first in the championship. He would claim another victory at Croft before sweeping the Silverstone weekend, eventually finishing second in the championship to Charlie Robertson. Following his strong rookie season, SV Racing team boss Danny Buxton stated that he believed Pittard had a bright future in GT racing. After returning to the Ginetta GT4 Supercup in 2015 for a pair of races, as well as a one-off in the North America-based FARA Endurance Championship, Pittard stepped away from professional racing until 2017.

=== GT racing ===
2017 saw Pittard return to pro racing, taking part in the British GT Championship with Lanan Racing. In line with his Ginetta roots, Pittard and co-driver Alex Reed took part in the GT4 class with a Ginetta G55 GT4, taking part in the Silver sub-class. The duo claimed their first and only victory of the season at Oulton Park; one of four podium finishes as they finished third in the class championship. Pittard supplemented his British GT campaign with historic racing, taking part in the FIA Masters Historic Sports Car Championship.

2018 saw Pittard travel to Germany, taking on a drive in the Nürburgring Endurance Series for Walkenhorst Motorsport. In just his third race behind the wheel of a GT3 car, he took pole position for the sixth race of the season. Pittard cited his decision to take up a drive in the series as an effort to attract the attention of a manufacturer for a factory drive. Ahead of the 2019 season, Pittard signed a full-time contract with Walkenhorst, who would employ him in the Nürburgring Endurance Series, Nürburgring 24 Hours, and 24 Hours of Spa. Pittard returned to the Nürburgring in 2019, claiming further victories in the Nürburgring Endurance Series. At the end of the season, he cited his goal in the immediate future as becoming a BMW factory driver.

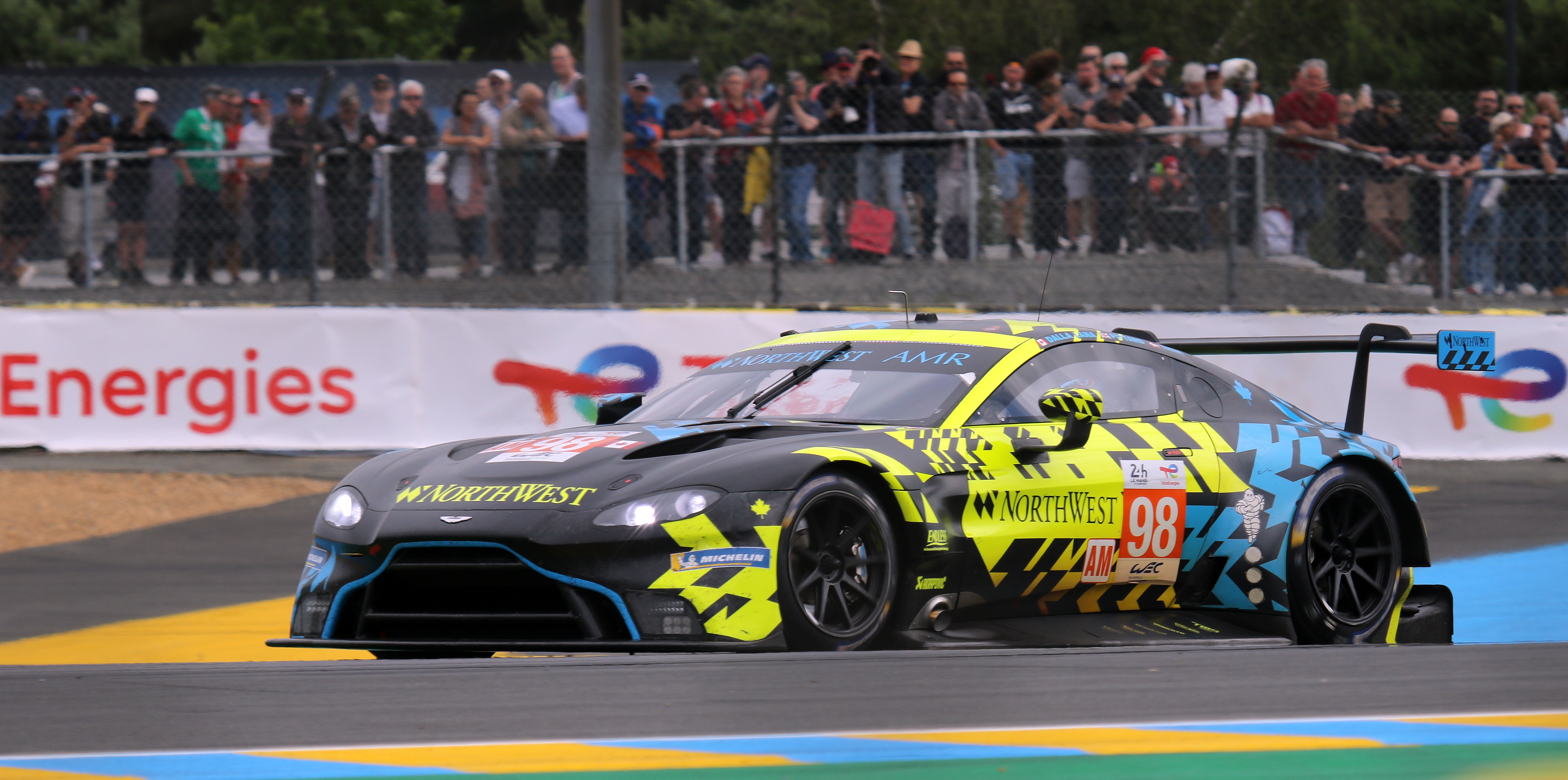
Pittard's Aston Martin Vantage GTE at the 2022 24 Hours of Le Mans.

In 2020, Pittard joined Walkenhorst for their entry into the Intercontinental GT Challenge, joining BMW factory drivers Martin Tomczyk and Nick Yelloly. Although the team didn't participate in the opening round at Bathurst, they claimed a podium at Indianapolis and would finish ninth in the overall championship. The following year, Pittard would join Walkenhorst for a full season campaign in the GT World Challenge Europe Endurance Cup, taking part in the Pro class. Through five races, the team would finish with just four total points, taking 28th in the championship. At the end of the season, Pittard would take part in both the BMW M Motorsport selected driver test in Spain as well as the WEC Rookie Test, where he would pilot an Aston Martin Vantage GTE. The move would be somewhat of a harbinger for Pittard, who would join Aston Martin for the 2022 FIA World Endurance Championship. However, his status was subject to a degree of confusion in the pre-season. After initially being confirmed as a full factory driver, Aston Martin Racing later stated that he was merely contracted to the Northwest AMR team, the customer operation with which Pittard was competing in 2022, to preserve his ranking as an FIA Silver-ranked driver. Paired with Nicki Thiim and Paul Dalla Lana, the trio would claim their sole victory of the season during the opening round at Sebring, but registered two further podiums and finished second in the GTE Am championship. At the end-of-season BRDC awards ceremony, Pittard was handed the Woolf Barnato Trophy, given to the highest-placed British driver in a British car at the 24 Hours of Le Mans.

Pittard formed a part of the Frikadelli Racing Team entry that won the 2023 24 Hours of Nürburgring, driving alongside Earl Bamber, Nicky Catsburg, and Felipe Fernández Laser. Pittard's position in the driver lineup wasn't initially confirmed until after the 2023 24 Hours of Daytona, which he had taken part in with the Heart of Racing Team.

== Racing record ==
=== Career summary ===
Season	Series	Team	Races	Wins	Poles	F/Laps	Podiums	Points	Position
2013	Ginetta GT5 Challenge - G40	SV21	18	3	2	1	7	346	5th
2014	Ginetta GT4 Supercup	SV Racing with KX	27	5	2	8	12	633	**2nd**
2015	Ginetta GT4 Supercup - Pro	Privateer	2	0	0	0	0	38	18th
2015	FARA Endurance Championship - MP-1A 2015		1	0	0	1	1	18	19th
2016	Touring Car Endurance Series - A3	Team BRIT							
2016	24H Series - A3	Team BRIT							
2017	British GT Championship - GT4	Lanan Racing	10	1	0	0	4	133	**3rd**
2017	FIA Masters Historic Sports Car Championship		5	0	0	0	0	39	4th
2018	FIA Masters Historic Sports Cars Post-66 Championship		1	0	0	0	1	9	20th
2019	Blancpain GT Series Endurance Cup	Walkenhorst Motorsport	1	0	0	0	0	0	NC
2019	Intercontinental GT Challenge	Walkenhorst Motorsport	1	0	0	0	0	0	NC
2019	24 Hours of Nürburgring - SP9	Walkenhorst Motorsport	1	0	0	0	0	N/A	DNF
2019	FIA Masters Historic Sports Cars Pre-66 Championship		1	0	1	1	0	0	NC
2020	GT World Challenge Europe Endurance Cup	Walkenhorst Motorsport	1	0	0	0	0	0	NC
2020	Intercontinental GT Challenge	Walkenhorst Motorsport	3	0	0	0	1	26	9th
2020	24 Hours of Nürburgring - SP9 Pro	Walkenhorst Motorsport	1	0	0	0	0	N/A	12th
2021	GT World Challenge Europe Endurance Cup	Walkenhorst Motorsport	5	0	0	0	0	4	28th
2021	24 Hours of Nürburgring - SP9 Pro	Walkenhorst Motorsport	1	0	0	0	0	N/A	11th
2022	GT World Challenge Europe Endurance Cup	Beechdean AMR	1	0	0	0	0	0	NC
2022	FIA World Endurance Championship - GTE Am	Northwest AMR	6	1	0	0	3	118	**2nd**
2022	IMSA SportsCar Championship - GTD	Northwest AMR	2	0	0	0	0	211	61st
2022	24 Hours of Nürburgring - SP9 Pro	TF Sport AMR	1	0	0	0	0	N/A	DNF
2023	IMSA SportsCar Championship - GTD Pro	Heart of Racing Team	3	0	0	0	0	837	10th
2023	24 Hours of Nürburgring - SP9	Frikadelli Racing Team	1	1	0	0	1	N/A	**1st**
2024	GT World Challenge Europe Endurance Cup	Walkenhorst Racing	5	0	0	0	0	12	18th
2024	Nürburgring Langstrecken-Serie - SP9	Walkenhorst Motorsport							
2024	24 Hours of Nürburgring - SP9	Walkenhorst Motorsport	1	0	0	0	0	N/A	DNF
2024	GT World Challenge Europe Sprint Cup	Comtoyou Racing	5	0	0	0	0	0	NC
2024	GT World Challenge Europe Sprint Cup - Gold	Comtoyou Racing	5	1	1	0	1	26.5	8th
2025	GT World Challenge Europe Endurance Cup	Walkenhorst Motorsport	4	0	0	0	0	5	24th
2025	Nürburgring Langstrecken-Serie - SP9	Walkenhorst Motorsport							
2025	24 Hours of Nürburgring - SP9	Walkenhorst Motorsport	1	0	0	0	0	N/A	DNF
2026	Nürburgring Langstrecken-Serie - SP9	KCMG							
2026	24 Hours of Nürburgring - SP9	KCMG	1	0	0	0	0	N/A	DNF
2026	Nürburgring Langstrecken-Serie - VT2-RWD								
2026	GT World Challenge Europe Sprint Cup	KPX Motorsport	10	0	0	0	0	2	28th
2026	GT World Challenge Europe Endurance Cup	Paradine Competition	1	0	0	0	0	9	26th

=== Complete GT World Challenge Europe results ===
==== GT World Challenge Europe Endurance Cup ====
Year	Team	Car	Class	1	2	3	4	5	6	7	Pos.	Points
2019	Walkenhorst Motorsport	BMW M6 GT3	Am	MNZ	SIL	LEC	SPA; 6H; 70	SPA; 12H; 70	SPA; 24H; Ret	CAT	NC	0
2020	Walkenhorst Motorsport	BMW M6 GT3	Pro	IMO	NÜR	SPA; 6H; 23	SPA; 12H; 18	SPA; 24H; Ret	LEC		NC	0
2021	Walkenhorst Motorsport	BMW M6 GT3	Pro	MNZ; 26	LEC; 8	SPA; 6H; 11	SPA; 12H; Ret	SPA; 24H; Ret	NÜR; 12	CAT; 21	28th	4
2022	Beechdean AMR	Aston Martin Vantage AMR GT3	Silver	IMO	LEC	SPA; 6H; Ret	SPA; 12H; Ret	SPA; 24H; Ret	HOC	CAT	NC	0
2024	Walkenhorst Racing	Aston Martin Vantage AMR GT3 Evo	Pro	LEC; Ret	SPA; 6H; 16	SPA; 12H; 15	SPA; 24H; 4	NÜR; 13	MNZ; 23	JED; 11	18th	12
2025	Walkenhorst Motorsport	Aston Martin Vantage AMR GT3 Evo	Pro	LEC; 8	MNZ; 12	SPA; 6H; WD	SPA; 12H; WD	SPA; 24H; WD	NÜR; 14	CAT; 10	24th	5
2026	Paradine Competition	BMW M4 GT3 Evo	Bronze	LEC	MNZ	SPA; 6H; 19	SPA; 12H; 2	SPA; 24H; 13	NÜR	ALG	9th	36

==== GT World Challenge Europe Sprint Cup ====
Year	Team	Car	Class	1	2	3	4	5	6	7	8	9	10	Pos.	Points
2024	Comtoyou Racing	Aston Martin Vantage AMR GT3 Evo	Gold	BRH; 1	BRH; 2	MIS; 1	MIS; 2	HOC; 1; 21	HOC; 2; 30	MAG; 1; 27	MAG; 2 DNS	**CAT**; **1**; 11	CAT; 2; 20	8th	26.5
2026	KPX Motorsport	BMW M4 GT3 Evo	Gold	BRH; 1; 29	BRH; 2; 24	MIS; 1; 30	MIS; 2; 25	MAG; 1; 26	MAG; 2; 31	ZAN; 1; 30	ZAN; 2; 37	CAT; 1; 8	CAT; 2 Ret	8th	43

^{†} Driver did not finish the race, but was classified as he completed over 90% of the race distance.

=== Complete 24 Hours of Nürburgring results ===
Year	Team	Co-Drivers	Car	Class	Laps	Pos.	Class Pos.
2019	(Germany) Walkenhorst Motorsport	(Norway) Christian Krognes (Spain) Lucas Ordóñez (United Kingdom) Nick Yelloly	BMW M6 GT3	SP9 Pro	10	DNF	DNF
2020	(Germany) Walkenhorst Motorsport	(Denmark) Mikkel Jensen (Norway) Christian Krognes (South Africa) Jordan Pepper	BMW M6 GT3	SP9 Pro	83	12th	12th
2021	(Germany) Walkenhorst Motorsport	(Norway) Christian Krognes (Germany) Jörg Müller (United Kingdom) Ben Tuck	BMW M6 GT3	SP9 Pro	57	15th	15th
2022	(United Kingdom) TF Sport AMR	(Belgium) Maxime Martin (Denmark) Marco Sørensen (Denmark) Nicki Thiim	Aston Martin Vantage AMR GT3	SP9 Pro	45	DNF	DNF
2023	(Germany) Frikadelli Racing Team	(New Zealand) Earl Bamber (Netherlands) Nicky Catsburg (Germany) Felipe Fernández Laser	Ferrari 296 GT3	SP9 Pro	162	**1st**	**1st**
2024	(Germany) Walkenhorst Motorsport	(Poland) Kuba Giermaziak (Norway) Christian Krognes (Denmark) Nicki Thiim	Aston Martin Vantage AMR GT3 Evo	SP9 Pro	26	DNF	DNF
2025	(Germany) Walkenhorst Motorsport	(Italy) Mattia Drudi (Norway) Christian Krognes (Denmark) Nicki Thiim	Aston Martin Vantage AMR GT3 Evo	SP9 Pro	72	DNF	DNF
2026	(Hong Kong) KCMG	(Japan) Nirei Fukuzumi (Japan) Naoya Gamou (Finland) Jesse Krohn	Mercedes-AMG GT3 Evo	SP9 Pro	15	DNF	DNF

=== Complete WeatherTech SportsCar Championship results ===
(key) (Races in bold indicate pole position)

Year	Team	Class	Make	Engine	1	2	3	4	5	6	7	8	9	10	11	12	Rank	Points
2022	Northwest AMR	GTD	Aston Martin Vantage AMR GT3	Aston Martin 4.0 L Turbo V8	DAY; 12	SEB	LBH	LGA	MDO	DET	WGL	MOS	LIM	ELK	VIR	PET	61st	211
2023	Heart of Racing Team	GTD Pro	Aston Martin Vantage AMR GT3	Aston Martin 4.0 L Turbo V8	DAY; 7	SEB; 8	LBH	MON	WGL	MOS	LIM	ELK	VIR	IMS	PET; 4		10th	837

=== Complete FIA World Endurance Championship results ===
Year	Entrant	Class	Car	Engine	1	2	3	4	5	6	Rank	Points
2022	Northwest AMR	LMGTE Am	Aston Martin Vantage AMR	Aston Martin 4.0 L Turbo V8	SEB; 1	SPA; 3	LMS; 2	MNZ; 8	FUJ; 5	BHR; 5	2nd	118

=== 24 Hours of Le Mans results ===
Year	Team	Co-Drivers	Car	Class	Laps	Pos.	Class Pos.
2022	(Canada) Northwest AMR	(Canada) Paul Dalla Lana (Denmark) Nicki Thiim	Aston Martin Vantage AMR	GTE; Am	342	36th	**3rd**
