= 2013 MSS Security V8 Supercars Challenge =

Motorsport event

(Victoria (state)) 2013 MSS Security V8 Supercars Challenge
Event Information
- Date: 25–28 March 2013
- Location: Melbourne, Victoria
- Venue: Melbourne Grand Prix Circuit
- Weather: Fine

Results
Race 1
Distance	12 laps	64 km
Pole position	Fabian Coulthard; Brad Jones Racing	1:55.6682
Winner	Fabian Coulthard; Brad Jones Racing	25:14.8756
Race 2
Distance	12 laps	64 km
Winner	Fabian Coulthard; Brad Jones Racing	24:38.9131
Race 3
Distance	12 laps	64 km
Winner	Fabian Coulthard; Brad Jones Racing	27:29.4439
Race 4
Distance	12 laps	64 km
Winner	Scott McLaughlin; Garry Rogers Motorsport	24:35.7698
Round Results
First	Fabian Coulthard; Brad Jones Racing	289 pts
Second	Jason Bright; Brad Jones Racing	238 pts
Third	Will Davison; Ford Performance Racing	224 pts

The 2013 V8 Supercars Albert Park Challenge was a motor race for the Australian sedan-based V8 Supercars. It was a stand-alone event not part of the 2013 International V8 Supercars Championship, but it was attended by all of the International Championship's teams. The event was held at the Melbourne Grand Prix Circuit as the principal support event of the 2013 Australian Grand Prix.

Fabian Coulthard won the opening three races with Scott McLaughlin winning the fourth and final race.

== Report ==
=== Qualifying ===
Pos.	No.	Name	Car	Team	Time
1	14	(New Zealand) Fabian Coulthard	Holden VF Commodore	Brad Jones Racing	1:55.6682
2^{1}	8	(Australia) Jason Bright	Holden VF Commodore	Brad Jones Racing	1:56.0173
3	97	(New Zealand) Shane van Gisbergen	Holden VF Commodore	Tekno Autosports	1:56.0444
4	888	(Australia) Craig Lowndes	Holden VF Commodore	Triple Eight Race Engineering	1:56.2054
5	1	(Australia) Jamie Whincup	Holden VF Commodore	Triple Eight Race Engineering	1:56.4227
6	55	(Australia) David Reynolds	Ford FG Falcon	Rod Nash Racing	1:56.6233
7	19	(Australia) Jonathon Webb	Holden VF Commodore	Tekno Autosports	1:56.7129
8	33	(New Zealand) Scott McLaughlin	Holden VF Commodore	Garry Rogers Motorsport	1:56.7223
9	6	(Australia) Will Davison	Ford FG Falcon	Ford Performance Racing	1:56.8193
10	5	(Australia) Mark Winterbottom	Ford FG Falcon	Ford Performance Racing	1:56.8625
11	66	(Australia) Russell Ingall	Holden VF Commodore	Walkinshaw Racing	1:57.2019
12	36	(Australia) Michael Caruso	Nissan Altima L33	Nissan Motorsport	1:57.2178
13	7	(Australia) Todd Kelly	Nissan Altima L33	Nissan Motorsport	1:57.2748
14	47	(Australia) Tim Slade	Mercedes-Benz E63 AMG	James Rosenberg Racing	1:57.3251
15	2	(Australia) Garth Tander	Holden VF Commodore	Holden Racing Team	1:57.3650
16	3	(Australia) Tony D'Alberto	Holden VF Commodore	Tony D'Alberto Racing	1:57.4147
17	21	(Australia) David Wall	Holden VF Commodore	Britek Motorsport	1:57.4390
18	22	(Australia) James Courtney	Holden VF Commodore	Holden Racing Team	1:57.4600
19	15	(Australia) Rick Kelly	Nissan Altima L33	Nissan Motorsport	1:57.4779
20	360	(Australia) James Moffat	Nissan Altima L33	Nissan Motorsport	1:57.4882
21	18	(Australia) Alex Davison	Ford FG Falcon	Charlie Schwerkolt Racing	1:57.5041
22	34	(Australia) Alexandre Prémat	Holden VF Commodore	Garry Rogers Motorsport	1:57.5220
23	4	(Australia) Lee Holdsworth	Mercedes-Benz E63 AMG	Erebus Motorsport	1:57.6629
24	88	(Australia) Dean Fiore	Holden VF Commodore	Lucas Dumbrell Motorsport	1:58.0042
25	17	(Australia) Tim Blanchard	Ford FG Falcon	Dick Johnson Racing	1:58.2013
26	9	(Germany) Maro Engel	Mercedes-Benz E63 AMG	Erebus Motorsport	1:58.9306
EXC^{2}	12	(New Zealand) Jonny Reid	Ford FG Falcon	Dick Johnson Racing	1:57.8355
EXC^{3}	80	(Australia) Scott Pye	Holden VF Commodore	Lucas Dumbrell Motorsport	1:57.4172

Notes:

- ^1 — Jason Bright was demoted two places on the grid for taking the chequered flag twice at the end of Practice 1.
- ^2 — Jonny Reid was excluded from the session for holding up Alexandre Prémat during the session.
- ^3 — Scott Pye was excluded from the session for leaving the pit lane without permission at the end of the session.

=== Race 1 ===
Pos.	No.	Name	Car	Team	Grid	Time	Points
1	14	(New Zealand) Fabian Coulthard	Holden VF Commodore	Brad Jones Racing	1	25:14.8756	75
2	8	(Australia) Jason Bright	Holden VF Commodore	Brad Jones Racing	4	+1.7467	69
3	6	(Australia) Will Davison	Ford FG Falcon	Ford Performance Racing	9	+4.6233	64
4	1	(Australia) Jamie Whincup	Holden VF Commodore	Triple Eight Race Engineering	5	+6.4004	60
5	888	(Australia) Craig Lowndes	Holden VF Commodore	Triple Eight Race Engineering	3	+7.1534	55
6	33	(New Zealand) Scott McLaughlin	Holden VF Commodore	Garry Rogers Motorsport	8	+7.1716	51
7	360	(Australia) James Moffat	Nissan Altima L33	Nissan Motorsport	20	+8.4223	48
8	2	(Australia) Garth Tander	Holden VF Commodore	Holden Racing Team	15	+14.3048	45
9	15	(Australia) Rick Kelly	Nissan Altima L33	Nissan Motorsport	19	+14.5232	42
10	22	(Australia) James Courtney	Holden VF Commodore	Holden Racing Team	18	+15.5583	39
11	7	(Australia) Todd Kelly	Nissan Altima L33	Nissan Motorsport	13	+15.7877	36
12	19	(Australia) Jonathon Webb	Holden VF Commodore	Tekno Autosports	7	+15.9691	34
13	55	(Australia) David Reynolds	Ford FG Falcon	Rod Nash Racing	6	+18.1643	33
14	17	(Australia) Tim Blanchard	Ford FG Falcon	Dick Johnson Racing	25	+19.2969	31
15	36	(Australia) Michael Caruso	Nissan Altima L33	Nissan Motorsport	12	+22.3795	30
16	66	(Australia) Russell Ingall	Holden VF Commodore	Walkinshaw Racing	11	+23.0077	28
17	88	(Australia) Dean Fiore	Holden VF Commodore	Lucas Dumbrell Motorsport	24	+23.2954	27
18	4	(Australia) Lee Holdsworth	Mercedes-Benz E63 AMG	Erebus Motorsport	23	+26.1491	25
19	21	(Australia) David Wall	Holden VF Commodore	Britek Motorsport	17	+26.5788	24
20	18	(Australia) Alex Davison	Ford FG Falcon	Charlie Schwerkolt Racing	21	+27.5962	22
21	80	(Australia) Scott Pye	Holden VF Commodore	Lucas Dumbrell Motorsport	28	+28.6292	21
22	47	(Australia) Tim Slade	Mercedes-Benz E63 AMG	James Rosenberg Racing	14	+29.9848	19
23	9	(Germany) Maro Engel	Mercedes-Benz E63 AMG	Erebus Motorsport	26	+34.2795	18
24	12	(New Zealand) Jonny Reid	Ford FG Falcon	Dick Johnson Racing	27	+40.2330	16
25	5	(Australia) Mark Winterbottom	Ford FG Falcon	Ford Performance Racing	9	+57.2767^{1}	15
Ret	97	(New Zealand) Shane van Gisbergen	Holden VF Commodore	Tekno Autosports	2	Gearbox	
Ret	34	(France) Alexandre Prémat	Holden VF Commodore	Garry Rogers Motorsport	22	Accident	
Ret	3	(Australia) Tony D'Alberto	Holden VF Commodore	Tony D'Alberto Racing	16	Accident	

Notes:

- ^1 — Mark Winterbottom was penalised fifty seconds for an unsafe pit release.

=== Race 2 ===
Pos.	No.	Name	Car	Team	Grid	Time	Points
1	14	(New Zealand) Fabian Coulthard	Holden VF Commodore	Brad Jones Racing	1	24:38.9131	75
2	8	(Australia) Jason Bright	Holden VF Commodore	Brad Jones Racing	2	+4.8875	69
3^{1}	888	(Australia) Craig Lowndes	Holden VF Commodore	Triple Eight Race Engineering	5	+2.1309	64
4	6	(Australia) Will Davison	Ford FG Falcon	Ford Performance Racing	3	+14.6794	60
5	360	(Australia) James Moffat	Nissan Altima L33	Nissan Motorsport	7	+15.1337	55
6	33	(New Zealand) Scott McLaughlin	Holden VF Commodore	Garry Rogers Motorsport	6	+15.6054	51
7	55	(Australia) David Reynolds	Ford FG Falcon	Rod Nash Racing	13	+19.0084	48
8	7	(Australia) Todd Kelly	Nissan Altima L33	Nissan Motorsport	11	+19.1730	45
9	97	(New Zealand) Shane van Gisbergen	Holden VF Commodore	Tekno Autosports	26	+21.6430	42
10	22	(Australia) James Courtney	Holden VF Commodore	Holden Racing Team	10	+22.1579	39
11	19	(Australia) Jonathon Webb	Holden VF Commodore	Tekno Autosports	12	+23.8646	36
12	5	(Australia) Mark Winterbottom	Ford FG Falcon	Ford Performance Racing	25	+27.8380	34
13	15	(Australia) Rick Kelly	Nissan Altima L33	Nissan Motorsport	9	+29.2584	33
14	36	(Australia) Michael Caruso	Nissan Altima L33	Nissan Motorsport	15	+29.5086	31
15	18	(Australia) Alex Davison	Ford FG Falcon	Charlie Schwerkolt Racing	20	+29.7064	30
16	3	(Australia) Tony D'Alberto	Holden VF Commodore	Tony D'Alberto Racing	27	+30.0255	28
17	66	(Australia) Russell Ingall	Holden VF Commodore	Walkinshaw Racing	16	+31.4344	27
18	4	(Australia) Lee Holdsworth	Mercedes-Benz E63 AMG	Erebus Motorsport	18	+36.7153	25
19	88	(Australia) Dean Fiore	Holden VF Commodore	Lucas Dumbrell Motorsport	17	+40.5788	24
20	17	(Australia) Tim Blanchard	Ford FG Falcon	Dick Johnson Racing	14	+41.8414	22
21	80	(Australia) Scott Pye	Holden VF Commodore	Lucas Dumbrell Motorsport	21	+42.1581	21
22	21	(Australia) David Wall	Holden VF Commodore	Britek Motorsport	19	+42.3978	19
23	12	(New Zealand) Jonny Reid	Ford FG Falcon	Dick Johnson Racing	24	+42.9018	18
24	9	(Germany) Maro Engel	Mercedes-Benz E63 AMG	Erebus Motorsport	23	+44.3861	16
25	1	(Australia) Jamie Whincup	Holden VF Commodore	Triple Eight Race Engineering	4	+56.7257	15
Ret	47	(Australia) Tim Slade	Mercedes-Benz E63 AMG	James Rosenberg Racing	22	Engine	
Ret	2	(Australia) Garth Tander	Holden VF Commodore	Holden Racing Team	8	Oil radiator	

Notes:

- ^1 — Craig Lowndes was relegated to third position for an unsafe pit release.

=== Race 3 ===
Pos.	No.	Name	Car	Team	Grid	Time	Points
1	14	(New Zealand) Fabian Coulthard	Holden VF Commodore	Brad Jones Racing	1	27:29.4439	75
2	55	(Australia) David Reynolds	Ford FG Falcon	Rod Nash Racing	7	+0.6864	69
3	8	(Australia) Jason Bright	Holden VF Commodore	Brad Jones Racing	2	+9.7504	64
4	22	(Australia) James Courtney	Holden VF Commodore	Holden Racing Team	10	+10.7603	60
5	6	(Australia) Will Davison	Ford FG Falcon	Ford Performance Racing	4	+11.1233	55
6	15	(Australia) Rick Kelly	Nissan Altima L33	Nissan Motorsport	13	+19.9648	51
7	5	(Australia) Mark Winterbottom	Ford FG Falcon	Ford Performance Racing	12	+20.1074	48
8	66	(Australia) Russell Ingall	Holden VF Commodore	Walkinshaw Racing	17	+25.7092	45
9	18	(Australia) Alex Davison	Ford FG Falcon	Charlie Schwerkolt Racing	15	+25.9445	42
10	360	(Australia) James Moffat	Nissan Altima L33	Nissan Motorsport	5	+28.2865	39
11	17	(Australia) Tim Blanchard	Ford FG Falcon	Dick Johnson Racing	20	+32.0330	36
12	21	(Australia) David Wall	Holden VF Commodore	Britek Motorsport	22	+36.8693	34
13	3	(Australia) Tony D'Alberto	Holden VF Commodore	Tony D'Alberto Racing	16	+37.6099	33
14	12	(New Zealand) Jonny Reid	Ford FG Falcon	Dick Johnson Racing	23	+43.3512	31
15	4	(Australia) Lee Holdsworth	Mercedes-Benz E63 AMG	Erebus Motorsport	18	+44.1397	30
16	33	(New Zealand) Scott McLaughlin	Holden VF Commodore	Garry Rogers Motorsport	6^{2}	+49.7772	28
17	47	(Australia) Tim Slade	Mercedes-Benz E63 AMG	James Rosenberg Racing	26	+1:03.8456	27
Ret	9	(Germany) Maro Engel	Mercedes-Benz E63 AMG	Erebus Motorsport	24	Electrics	
Ret	2	(Australia) Garth Tander	Holden VF Commodore	Holden Racing Team	27	Steering	
EXC^{1}	97	(New Zealand) Shane van Gisbergen	Holden VF Commodore	Tekno Autosports	9		
EXC^{1}	888	(Australia) Craig Lowndes	Holden VF Commodore	Triple Eight Race Engineering	3		
EXC^{1}	19	(Australia) Jonathon Webb	Holden VF Commodore	Tekno Autosports	11		
EXC^{1}	36	(Australia) Michael Caruso	Nissan Altima L33	Nissan Motorsport	14		
EXC^{1}	7	(Australia) Todd Kelly	Nissan Altima L33	Nissan Motorsport	8		
EXC^{1}	1	(Australia) Jamie Whincup	Holden VF Commodore	Triple Eight Race Engineering	25		
EXC^{1}	80	(Australia) Scott Pye	Holden VF Commodore	Lucas Dumbrell Motorsport	21		
EXC^{1}	88	(Australia) Dean Fiore	Holden VF Commodore	Lucas Dumbrell Motorsport	19		

Notes:

- ^1 — Shane van Gisbergen, Craig Lowndes, Jonathon Webb, Michael Carsuo, Todd Kelly, Jamie Whincup, Scott Pye and Dean Fiore were excluded from the results after their cars were found to be outside the allowed ignition timing variance.
- ^2 — Scott McLaughlin was due to start from sixth place on the grid, however his car failed to fire at the start of the warm up lap and he started from pit lane.

=== Race 4 ===
Pos.	No.	Name	Car	Team	Grid^{1}	Time	Points
1	33	(New Zealand) Scott McLaughlin	Holden VF Commodore	Garry Rogers Motorsport	7	24:35.7698	75
2	888	(Australia) Craig Lowndes	Holden VF Commodore	Triple Eight Race Engineering	9	+1.6852	69
3	14	(New Zealand) Fabian Coulthard	Holden VF Commodore	Brad Jones Racing	1	+2.0032	64
4	55	(Australia) David Reynolds	Ford FG Falcon	Rod Nash Racing	4	+2.4752	60
5	18	(Australia) Alex Davison	Ford FG Falcon	Charlie Schwerkolt Racing	12	+6.7752	55
6	1	(Australia) Jamie Whincup	Holden VF Commodore	Triple Eight Race Engineering	17	+8.3943	51
7	7	(Australia) Todd Kelly	Nissan Altima L33	Nissan Motorsport	14	+9.3351	48
8	6	(Australia) Will Davison	Ford FG Falcon	Ford Performance Racing	3	+13.8983	45
9	97	(New Zealand) Shane van Gisbergen	Holden VF Commodore	Tekno Autosports	25	+14.0136	42
10	360	(Australia) James Moffat	Nissan Altima L33	Nissan Motorsport	5	+14.3803	39
11	8	(Australia) Jason Bright	Holden VF Commodore	Brad Jones Racing	2	+16.4297	36
12	36	(Australia) Michael Caruso	Nissan Altima L33	Nissan Motorsport	20	+20.0522	34
13	15	(Australia) Rick Kelly	Nissan Altima L33	Nissan Motorsport	8	+21.3834	33
14	17	(Australia) Tim Blanchard	Ford FG Falcon	Dick Johnson Racing	13	+22.1463	31
15	21	(Australia) David Wall	Holden VF Commodore	Britek Motorsport	16	+22.6272	30
16	80	(Australia) Scott Pye	Holden VF Commodore	Lucas Dumbrell Motorsport	26	+27.7706	28
17	88	(Australia) Dean Fiore	Holden VF Commodore	Lucas Dumbrell Motorsport	21	+27.9402	27
18	12	(New Zealand) Jonny Reid	Ford FG Falcon	Dick Johnson Racing	19	+28.6582	25
19	3	(Australia) Tony D'Alberto	Holden VF Commodore	Tony D'Alberto Racing	22	+30.6041	24
20	4	(Australia) Lee Holdsworth	Mercedes-Benz E63 AMG	Erebus Motorsport	15	+34.1072	22
21	9	(Germany) Maro Engel	Mercedes-Benz E63 AMG	Erebus Motorsport	27	+34.3546	21
Ret	19	(Australia) Jonathon Webb	Holden VF Commodore	Tekno Autosports	18		
Ret	2	(Australia) Garth Tander	Holden VF Commodore	Holden Racing Team	24		
Ret	47	(Australia) Tim Slade	Mercedes-Benz E63 AMG	James Rosenberg Racing	23		
Ret	5	(Australia) Mark Winterbottom	Ford FG Falcon	Ford Performance Racing	11	Accident	
Ret	66	(Australia) Russell Ingall	Holden VF Commodore	Walkinshaw Racing	10	Accident	
Ret	22	(Australia) James Courtney	Holden VF Commodore	Holden Racing Team	6	Engine	

Notes:

- ^1 — Grid positions for Race 4 were based on the combined points from the previous three races during the weekend.
