= 2015 FIA GT World Cup =

1st World Cup for GT3-spec sports cars in Macau

Race details
Date	22 November 2015
Official name	62nd Suncity Group Macau Grand Prix
Location	Guia Circuit, Macau
Course	Temporary street circuit 6.120 km (3.803 mi)
Distance	Qualifying Race; 12 laps, 61.200 km (38.028 mi); Main Race; 14 laps, 85.684 km (53.242 mi)
- Qualifying Race

Pole
Driver	(Germany) Stefan Mücke	Craft-Bamboo Racing
Time	2:18.032

Fastest Lap
Driver	(Germany) Stefan Mücke	Craft-Bamboo Racing
Time	2:18.930 (on lap 10)

Podium
First	(Germany) Maro Engel	Mercedes AMG Driving Academy
Second	(Italy) Edoardo Mortara	Audi Sport Team Phoenix
Third	(Germany) Stefan Mücke	Craft-Bamboo Racing
- Main Race

Pole
Driver	(Germany) Maro Engel	Mercedes AMG Driving Academy

Fastest Lap
Driver	(Germany) Stefan Mücke	Craft-Bamboo Racing
Time	2:19.736 (on lap 11)

Podium
First	(Germany) Maro Engel	Mercedes AMG Driving Academy
Second	(Germany) René Rast	Audi Sport Team WRT
Third	(Germany) Stefan Mücke	Craft-Bamboo Racing

The 2015 FIA GT World Cup was the race's inaugural edition and the eighth time Grand Touring (GT) sports car machinery participated in Macau's autonomous territory. On November 22, it was staged in the streets of the city as a non-championship race as part of the GT Asia Series in GT3-spec cars. The Automobile General Association Macau-China appointed the Stéphane Ratel Organisation (SRO) to assist in establishing a grid. The race itself consisted of two races: a 12-lap qualification race that determined the starting grid for the 14-lap main race.

Mercedes AMG Driving Academy driver Maro Engel won the main race from pole position after winning the Qualification Race the previous day after on-track victor Edoardo Mortara was penalised ten seconds for brake testing him. Mortara accelerated faster than Engel during the rolling start, but he quickly lost the lead to the former. Engel then dominated the rest of the race, which was stopped two laps early due to a multi-car accident behind the safety car, and the result was recalculated two laps back. René Rast finished second in his Audi R8 LMS, while Stefan Mücke completed the podium in his Craft-Bamboo Racing entered Aston Martin Vantage V12.

== Entry list and rules ==
To enter the FIA GT World Cup in Macau, drivers had to compete in a Fédération Internationale de l'Automobile (FIA)-regulated championship based on GT3 regulations. On 11 September 2015, Audi, Aston Martin, Mercedes-Benz, McLaren and Porsche were announced as the five manufacturers accepted to enter the event that was open to any car model meeting GT3 rules. Manufacturers could enter up to three drivers through privateer teams, and the teams representing manufacturers could field both gold and platinum ranked drivers; bronze and silver-rated entrants were considered on a case-by-case basis by the FIA GT World Cup Committee. On October 7, 2015, the FIA GT World Cup entry list was released. The first list of participants had 22 drivers, including 2014 Macau GT Cup race winner Maro Engel, two-time Macau Grand Prix victor Edoardo Mortara, and 24 Hours of Le Mans co-winner Earl Bamber. René Rast, a World Endurance Championship participant, was called in as a late replacement for Laurens Vanthoor, who withdrew from the race on doctor's orders after injuring his hip at the Misano World Circuit's Blancpain Sprint Series round.

== Background ==
The 2015 FIA GT World Cup was the event's maiden running and the eighth time Grand Touring (GT) cars contested in Macau. It took place on November 22, 2015, at the 6.2 km (3.9 mi) 22-turn Guia Circuit, after three days of practise and qualifying. The motorsport promoter Stéphane Ratel Organisation (SRO) elected not to renew its contract with the FIA two years before the 2015 FIA GT World Cup, and in early 2013, the SRO's founder, Stéphane Ratel, proposed creating a race for the finest teams and drivers. These proposals were dormant for a while until an FIA World Motor Sport Council meeting in Doha saw the idea resurface and eventually confirmed by the sport's governing body on 20 March 2015. It was the first collaboration between Ratel and the FIA since the FIA GT1 World Championship disbanded. The FIA GT World Cup was granted its status after the World Touring Car Championship stopped travelling to Macau, and it replaced the Baku World Challenge which was discontinued that year when Formula One announced it would hold a race in the city from 2016. The Automobile General Association Macao-China, the race's promoter, asked the SRO to assist in forming a grid.

== Practice and qualifying ==
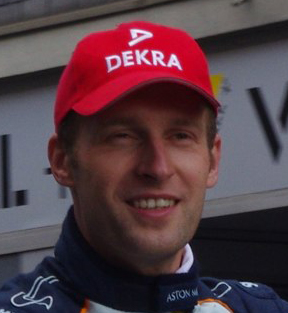
Stefan Mücke (pictured in 2011) took pole position in the closing minutes of qualifying.

There was one 30-minute practice session each on Thursday afternoon and Friday morning before Sunday's race. Renger van der Zande set the quickest lap for the Mercedes AMG Driving Academy SLS GT3 in the first practise session at 2:20.796, two-tenths of a second faster than anybody else. In second place was his brandmate Engel. Mortara finished third in the lone Audi Sport Team Phoenix R8 LMS entry. Darryl O'Young's Aston Martin V12 Vantage finished fourth. Bamber was the fastest Porsche competitor, finishing fifth. Positions six through ten were filled by Stefan Mücke, André Couto, Keita Sawa, Rast, and Richard Lyons. Engel led for the majority of the second practice session until Mücke passed him with a time of 2:20.082, the fastest lap of the weekend at the time. Van Der Zande finished second, 0.021 seconds slower, with Adderly Fong third Engel was fourth, and Bamber fifth, repeating his first practise session performance. Positions six through ten were filled by O'Young, Mortara, Álvaro Parente, his teammate Kévin Estre, and Rast.

Friday afternoon's half-hour qualifying session determined the starting order for the qualification race through each driver's fastest lap times. Before he hit an inside kerbstone at Mandarin Corner and lost control of his car, which then drifted into a barrier (the first of three stoppages), Engel was the early leader in qualifying. Engel took responsibility for the collision and apologised to his team. Van Der Zande's crash into a wall at Paiol caused qualifying to be turn red-flagged qualifying for the second time to repair the barriers. With less than 12 minutes remaining. Audi devised a strategy to let Mortara to drive in clear air for a pole position effort. But Cuoto experienced oversteer and severely damaged his car in an incident at Mandarin curve, which ricocheted between the barriers. Cuoto's crash, which left him unhurt, led to the session's third and last interruption. With six minutes left in qualifying, Mortara started recording fast sector times to take provisional pole before Mücke passed him with a lap of 2:18.032. Mücke was joined on the grid's front row by Mortara. Engel's accident left him in third. Rast was fourth, Van Der Zande fifth and O'Young sixth. O'Young's teammate Lyons was seventh. Bamber, Fong and Parente were eighth to tenth, respectively. Estre was the fastest driver not to qualify in the top ten, ahead of teammate Cuoto, Sawa, Marchy Lee, the Thai duo of Pasin Lathouras and Vutthikorn Inthraphuvasak, Dylan Derdaele, Jeffrey Lee, Weng Sun Mok and Philip Ma. John Shen and Jacky Yeung completed the 22 qualifiers.

=== Qualifying classification ===
Final qualifying results
Pos.	Class	No.	Driver	Team	Manufacturer	Time	Gap
1	P	97	(Germany) Stefan Mücke	(Hong Kong) Craft-Bamboo Racing	Aston Martin	2:18.032	—
2	P	6	(Italy) Edoardo Mortara	(Germany) Audi Sport Team Phoenix	Audi	2:18.144	+0.112
3	P	1	(Germany) Maro Engel	(Germany) Mercedes AMG Driving Academy	Mercedes-Benz	2:18.168	+0.136
4	P	7	(Germany) René Rast	(Belgium) Audi Sport Team WRT	Audi	2:18.315	+0.283
5	G	2	(Netherlands) Renger van der Zande	(Germany) Mercedes AMG Driving Academy	Mercedes-Benz	2:18.746	+0.714
6	S	55	(Hong Kong) Darryl O'Young	(Hong Kong) Craft-Bamboo Racing	Aston Martin	2:19.427	+1.395
7	G	99	(United Kingdom) Richard Lyons	(Hong Kong) Craft-Bamboo Racing	Aston Martin	2:19.637	+1.605
8	G	19	(New Zealand) Earl Bamber	(Hong Kong) LKM Racing	Porsche	2:19.687	+1.655
9	S	8	(Hong Kong) Adderly Fong	(Hong Kong) Bentley Team Absolute	Bentley	2:19.972	+1.940
10	P	25	(Portugal) Álvaro Parente	(China) FFF Racing Team	McLaren	2:20.048	+2.016
11	P	15	(France) Kévin Estre	(China) FFF Racing Team	McLaren	2:20.255	+2.223
12	G	5	(Macau) André Couto	(China) FFF Racing Team	McLaren	2:20.584	+2.552
13	S	88	(Japan) Keita Sawa	(Hong Kong) Bentley Team Absolute	Bentley	2:21.136	+3.104
14	S	30	(Hong Kong) Marchy Lee	Audi Hong Kong	Audi	2:21.679	+3.647
15	S	10	(Thailand) Pasin Lathouras	(Italy) AF Corse	Ferrari	2:22.249	+4.217
16	S	9	(Thailand) Vutthikorn Inthraphuvasak	(Thailand) Est Cola Racing Team	Porsche	2:25.318	+7.286
17	S	20	(Belgium) Dylan Derdaele	(Japan) Gulf Racing JP	Porsche	2:26.550	+8.518
18	B	33	(Chinese Taipei) Jeffrey Lee	(Hong Kong) Absolute Racing	Audi	2:26.952	+8.920
19	B	3	(Singapore) Weng Sun Mok	(Singapore) Clearwater Racing	McLaren	2:28.204	+10.172
20	S	98	(Hong Kong) Philip Ma	(Hong Kong) Absolute Racing	Audi	2:30.907	+12.875
21	B	68	(Canada) John Shen	(Hong Kong) Modena Motorsports	Porsche	2:34.703	+16.671
22	B	77	(Hong Kong) Jacky Yeung	(Hong Kong) Bentley Team Absolute	Bentley	2:35.302	+17.270

Categorisation
Icon	Class
P	Platinum
G	Gold
S	Silver
B	Bronze

== Qualifying race ==
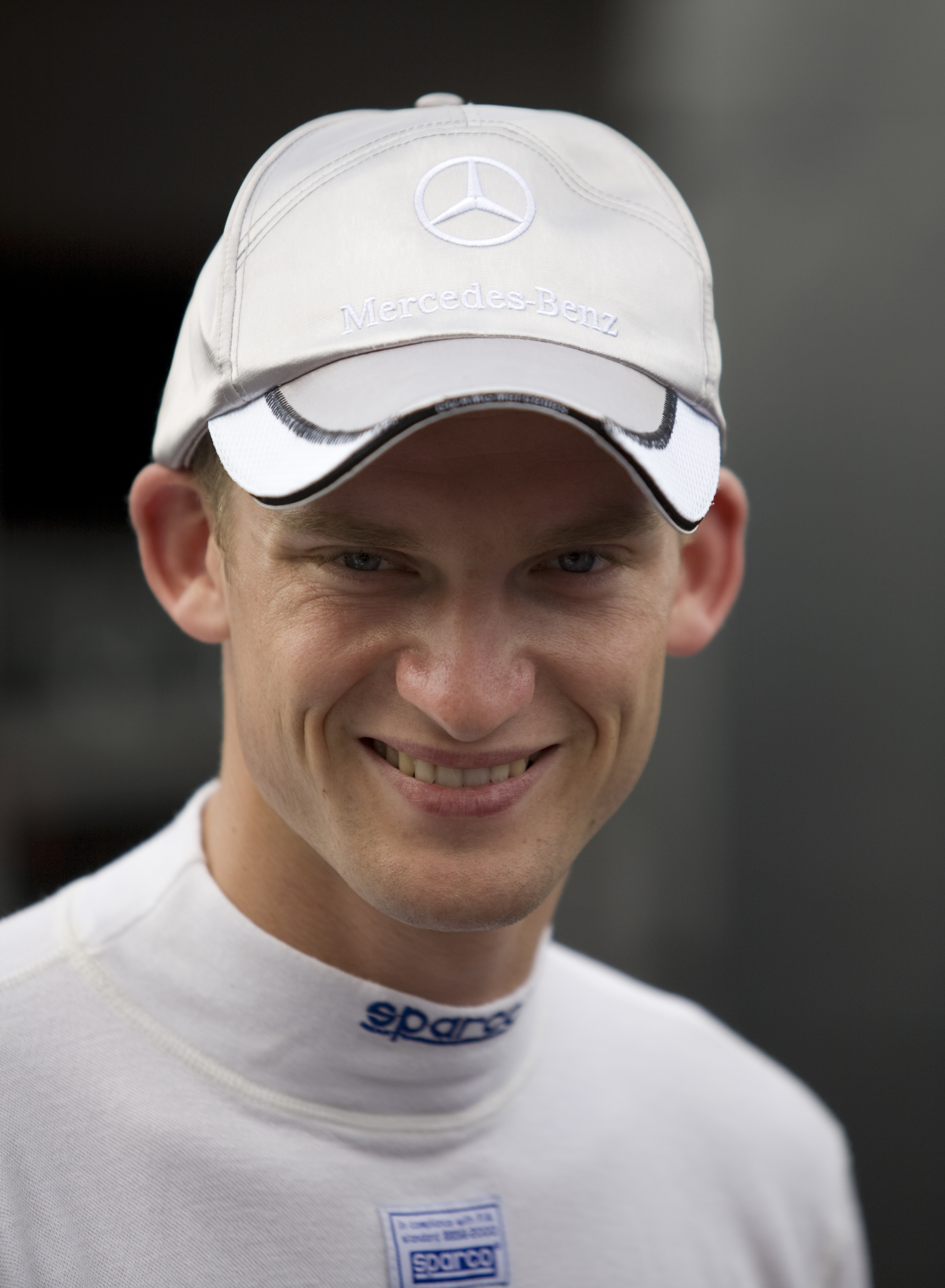
Maro Engel (pictured in 2009) won the qualification race to start from pole position in the main race which he won.

At 12:15 Macau Standard Time (UTC+08:00), the qualifying race to set the main race's starting order began under dry and cloudy conditions with the air and track temperatures at 26 °C (79 °F) and 27 °C (81 °F). At the start, Mücke stopped Mortara's overtake to retain the lead into Mandarin turn, before Engel used his straightline speed to pass Mortara for second position approaching Lisboa corner. Rast dropped to fifth as brandmate Marchy Lee gained another position before turning into Lisboa corner. Despite matching his pace earlier in the race, Engel was unable to challenge Mücke because the leader controlled his speed; both men pulled away from the trailing Mortara and Van Der Zande. Fong lost control of his Bentley Continental GT and crashed heavily at the Solitude Esses on the third lap. The safety car was deployed a lap later to neutralise the order because his car was stranded in the centre of the track.

At the lap eight restart, Mücke got away cleanly to lead the race back up to speed, with Engel and Mortara close behind. Simultaneously, fourth-placed Van Der Zande sought but failed to move up the order. Engel had to take evasive action when Mücke accelerated and then abruptly braked. After the race, Engel expressed his surprise at Mücke's actions. The leaders were unable to execute any further manoeuvres, and the margins at the front grew progressively until the qualification race ended. Mücke led the race from start to finish. He was then found to have brake tested Engel in violation of the regulations and was given a ten-second time penalty. Engel was given the victory and took pole position for the main race. Mortara joined him on the grid's front row. Mücke's penalty demoted him to third place. Van Der Zande was fourth, Rast was fifth, and Lyons was sixth. Following closely were Bamber, O'Young, Parente, and Estre, who rounded out the top ten. Sawa, Marchy Lee, Lathouras, Inthraphuvasak, Derdaele, Jeffrey Lee, Sun Mok, Sheng, Yeng, Cuoto, and Ma were the final 21 classified finishers.

=== Qualifying race classification ===
Classification of the qualifying race
Pos.	Class	No.	Driver	Team	Manufacturer	Laps	Time/Retired
1	P	1	(Germany) Maro Engel	(Germany) Mercedes AMG Driving Academy	Mercedes-Benz	12	34:38.768
2	P	6	(Italy) Edoardo Mortara	(Germany) Audi Sport Team Phoenix	Audi	12	+5.212
3	P	97	(Germany) Stefan Mücke	(Hong Kong) Craft-Bamboo Racing	Aston Martin	12	+8.303
4	G	2	(Netherlands) Renger van der Zande	(Germany) Mercedes AMG Driving Academy	Mercedes-Benz	12	+8.331
5	P	7	(Germany) René Rast	(Belgium) Audi Sport Team WRT	Audi	12	+9.112
6	G	99	(United Kingdom) Richard Lyons	(Hong Kong) Craft-Bamboo Racing	Aston Martin	12	+10.312
7	G	19	(New Zealand) Earl Bamber	(Hong Kong) LKM Racing	Porsche	12	+11.225
8	S	55	(Hong Kong) Darryl O'Young	(Hong Kong) Craft-Bamboo Racing	Aston Martin	12	+12.375
9	P	25	(Portugal) Álvaro Parente	(China) FFF Racing Team	McLaren	12	+13.004
10	P	15	(France) Kévin Estre	(China) FFF Racing Team	McLaren	12	+13.634
11	S	88	(Japan) Keita Sawa	(Hong Kong) Bentley Team Absolute	Bentley	12	+20.312
12	S	30	(Hong Kong) Marchy Lee	Audi Hong Kong	Audi	12	+22.110
13	S	10	(Thailand) Pasin Lathouras	(Italy) AF Corse	Ferrari	12	+22.290
14	S	9	(Thailand) Vutthikorn Inthraphuvasak	(Thailand) Est Cola Racing Team	Porsche	12	+36.772
15	S	20	(Belgium) Dylan Derdaele	(Japan) Gulf Racing JP	Porsche	12	+56.464
16	B	33	(Chinese Taipei) Jeffrey Lee	(Hong Kong) Absolute Racing	Audi	12	+1:01.009
17	B	3	(Singapore) Weng Sun Mok	(Singapore) Clearwater Racing	McLaren	12	+1:01.682
18	B	68	(Canada) John Shen	(Hong Kong) Modena Motorsports	Porsche	12	+1:17.517
19	B	77	(Hong Kong) Jacky Yeung	(Hong Kong) Bentley Team Absolute	Bentley	12	+1:51.644
20	G	5	(Macau) André Couto	(China) FFF Racing Team	McLaren	11	+1 Lap
21	S	98	(Hong Kong) Philip Ma	(Hong Kong) Absolute Racing	Audi	11	+1 Lap
Ret	S	8	(Hong Kong) Adderly Fong	(Hong Kong) Bentley Team Absolute	Bentley	2	Accident

== Main race ==
The race began under dry and sunny weather at 12:55 local time. The air temperature was 28 °C (82 °F) and a track temperature at 28 °C (82 °F). Fong withdrew from the race because his chassis was too damaged from the previous day's qualification race crash. Mortara made a quick getaway after the race's rolling start and stopped Engel's initial pass to take the lead before the Mandarin Oriental corner. Mortara lost the lead to Engel when he steered into the inside as they approached the Reservoir Kink bend. After a brisk start, his teammate van der Zande took second position. Mücke then took third from Mortara before Lisboa corner. Estre collided with Lyon's rear at the turn, and both drivers retired. After crashing into a barrier at San Francisco Bend, Bamber retired on the lap. At the end of the first lap, Engel led teammate Van der Zande, followed by, Mortara, Mücke, Parente, O'Young, Sawa, Marchy Lee and Lathouras. The first five were covered by five seconds with the rest of the field 18 seconds behind them.

It's unbelievable, I’m overjoyed as the best GT drivers were up against each other in this race, so I’m proud to be the first winner of the FIA GT World Cup! But I’m especially proud of my team. I made a big mistake in qualifying on Friday and I thought right there, standing in the wall, that my weekend might be over and I blew the opportunity we had here. To win this race is amazing because I just love this place, I love this track. I had to make a really good start and I knew I had to hold the inside line and stay in front or try to get ahead in the Mandarin corner, otherwise it would be difficult. I just managed to pass Edoardo Mortara on the left-hand side, so that was the key to retaking the lead. From there I really put my head down; I just focused on my driving, trying to keep cool and open up the gap.

— Maro Engel, on winning the inaugural FIA GT World Cup.

At the midway, Derdaele's car had a punctured tyre and retired at Lisboa curve, while Parente lost sixth place to O'Young by having a better exit out of a turn. Meanwhile, Engel extended his advantage over second-placed Van Der Zande when the course of the race altered on lap 12. Van Der Zande was slowed by traffic, allowing Mücke to challenge him for second place heading into Lisboa bend. As a result of the manoeuvre, Mücke struck Van der Zande's vehicle from behind, causing debris to land in Mücke's left rear wheel. The two collided as Mücke passed Van Der Zande on the inside as they approached Lisboa corner on the next lap. Both drivers ran wide under braking, allowing Rast and Mortara of Audi into second and third places. When the safety car was deployed to close the field down following an accident on lap 14, Engel's eight-second lead over Mortara was reduced to nothing. Inthraphuvasak crashed at Paiol corner, leaving his vehicle stranded in the middle of the course.

As everyone waited for additional laps at racing speed behind the safety car, a multi-vehicle accident occurred at Moorish Hill with 2½ laps to go. The lapped Shen struck the tyre barrier, and every driver behind him collided with each other since he blocked the course. Race control decided to stop the race and not restart it, counting back the result by two laps. Engel won the first FIA GT World Cup, his second consecutive victory in Macau after winning the GT event in 2014. Mortara finished second before a 20-second time penalty was enforced by the International Sporting Code for being deemed to have jumped the start, promoting Rast and Mucke to second and third. Off the podium, Van Der Zande, O'Young, Mortara, Parente, Marchy Lee, Sawa and Lathouras, Couto, Jeffrey Lee, Sun, Shen, Ma, Yueng and Inthraphuvasak were the final finishers.

=== Main race classification ===
Classification of the main race
Pos.	Class	No.	Driver	Team	Manufacturer	Laps	Time/Retired
1	P	1	(Germany) Maro Engel	(Germany) Mercedes AMG Driving Academy	Mercedes-Benz	14	33:28.832
2	P	7	(Germany) René Rast	(Belgium) Audi Sport Team WRT	Audi	14	+2.900
3	P	97	(Germany) Stefan Mücke	(Hong Kong) Craft-Bamboo Racing	Aston Martin	14	+3.690
4	G	2	(Netherlands) Renger van der Zande	(Germany) Mercedes AMG Driving Academy	Mercedes-Benz	14	+4.422
5	S	55	(Hong Kong) Darryl O'Young	(Hong Kong) Craft-Bamboo Racing	Aston Martin	14	+17.444
6 (Note: Mortara had originally placed at second, but a twenty-second time penalty was later applied due to jump start.)	P	6	(Italy) Edoardo Mortara	(Germany) Audi Sport Team Phoenix	Audi	14	+22.321
7	P	25	(Portugal) Álvaro Parente	(China) FFF Racing Team	McLaren	14	+24.880
8	S	30	(Hong Kong) Marchy Lee	Audi Hong Kong	Audi	14	+37.248
9	S	88	(Japan) Keita Sawa	(Hong Kong) Bentley Team Absolute	Bentley	14	+30.404
10	S	10	(Thailand) Pasin Lathouras	(Italy) AF Corse	Ferrari	14	+40.354
11	G	5	(Macau) André Couto	(China) FFF Racing Team	McLaren	14	+1:32.315/Accident
12	B	33	(Chinese Taipei) Jeffrey Lee	(Hong Kong) Absolute Racing	Audi	14	+2:29.634
13	B	3	(Singapore) Weng Sun Mok	(Singapore) Clearwater Racing	McLaren	14	+3:08.350
14	B	68	(Canada) John Shen	(Hong Kong) Modena Motorsports	Porsche	13	+1 Lap/Accident
15	S	98	(Hong Kong) Philip Ma	(Hong Kong) Absolute Racing	Audi	13	+1 Lap
16	B	77	(Hong Kong) Jacky Yeung	(Hong Kong) Bentley Team Absolute	Bentley	13	+1 Lap
17	S	9	(Thailand) Vutthikorn Inthraphuvasak	(Thailand) Est Cola Racing Team	Porsche	12	Accident
Ret	S	20	(Belgium) Dylan Derdaele	(Japan) Gulf Racing JP	Porsche	7	Puncture
Ret	G	19	(New Zealand) Earl Bamber	(Hong Kong) LKM Racing	Porsche	1	Accident Damage
Ret	P	15	(France) Kévin Estre	(China) FFF Racing Team	McLaren	1	Collision Damage
Ret	G	99	(United Kingdom) Richard Lyons	(Hong Kong) Craft-Bamboo Racing	Aston Martin	0	Collision
DNS (Note: Adderly Fong did not start the Main Race, because his Bentley had too much damage after a crash the day before in the Qualifying Race.)	S	8	(Hong Kong) Adderly Fong	(Hong Kong) Bentley Team Absolute	Bentley	—	Accident

== FIA GT World Cup for Manufacturers ==
The FIA GT World Cup for Manufacturers award was presented to the manufacturer supplying the cars with a manufacturer entry with the highest number of points after adding the points of its two best cars awarded based on the result of the Main Race.

=== Scoring system ===
To be classified and earn points, entries had to complete 90 per cent of the winning car's race distance. The pole position winner received no points.

==== Main Race points ====
Points scoring system for the FIA GT World Cup
Position	**1st**	**2nd**	**3rd**	**4th**	**5th**	**6th**	**7th**	**8th**	**9th**	**10th**
Points	25	18	15	12	10	8	6	4	2	1

Final FIA GT World Cup for Manufacturers standings
Pos.	Manufacturer	Car	Drivers	(Macau) MAC		Total
Pos.	Manufacturer	Car	Drivers	QR	MR	Total
1	(Germany) Mercedes-Benz	SLS AMG GT3	(Germany) Maro Engel	1	1	37
1	(Germany) Mercedes-Benz	SLS AMG GT3	(Netherlands) Renger van der Zande	4	4	37
2	(Germany) Audi	R8 LMS	(Hong Kong) Marchy Lee	12	8^{1}	26
2	(Germany) Audi	R8 LMS	(Italy) Edoardo Mortara	2	6	26
2	(Germany) Audi	R8 LMS	(Germany) René Rast	5	2	26
3	(United Kingdom) Aston Martin	V12 Vantage GT3	(United Kingdom) Richard Lyons	6	Ret^{1}	25
3	(United Kingdom) Aston Martin	V12 Vantage GT3	(Germany) Stefan Mücke	**3**	3	25
3	(United Kingdom) Aston Martin	V12 Vantage GT3	(Hong Kong) Darryl O'Young	8	5	25
4	(United Kingdom) McLaren	650S GT3	(Macau) André Couto	20	11	6
4	(United Kingdom) McLaren	650S GT3	(France) Kévin Estre	10	Ret^{1}	6
4	(United Kingdom) McLaren	650S GT3	(Portugal) Álvaro Parente	9	7	6
5	(Germany) Porsche	997 GT3-R	(New Zealand) Earl Bamber	7	Ret^{1}	0
5	(Germany) Porsche	997 GT3-R	(Belgium) Dylan Derdaele	15	Ret	0
5	(Germany) Porsche	997 GT3-R	(Thailand) Vutthikorn Inthraphuvasak	14	17†	0

Key
Colour	Result
Gold	Race winner
Silver	2nd place
Bronze	3rd place
Green	Points finish
Blue	Non-points finish
Blue	Non-classified finish (NC)
Purple	Did not finish (Ret)
Black	Disqualified (DSQ)
Black	Excluded (EX)
White	Did not start (DNS)
White	Race cancelled (C)
White	Withdrew (WD)
Blank	Did not participate

**Bold** – Pole

Italics – Fastest Lap

Notes

- † – Drivers did not finish the race, but were classified as they completed over 90% of the race distance.
- ^{1} – Only the two best highest finishing cars of a manufacturer are able to score points. The result of the lowest finishing car is not included.

== See also ==
- 2015 Macau Grand Prix
- 2015 Guia Race of Macau
