= Maro Engel =

German racing driver (born 1985)

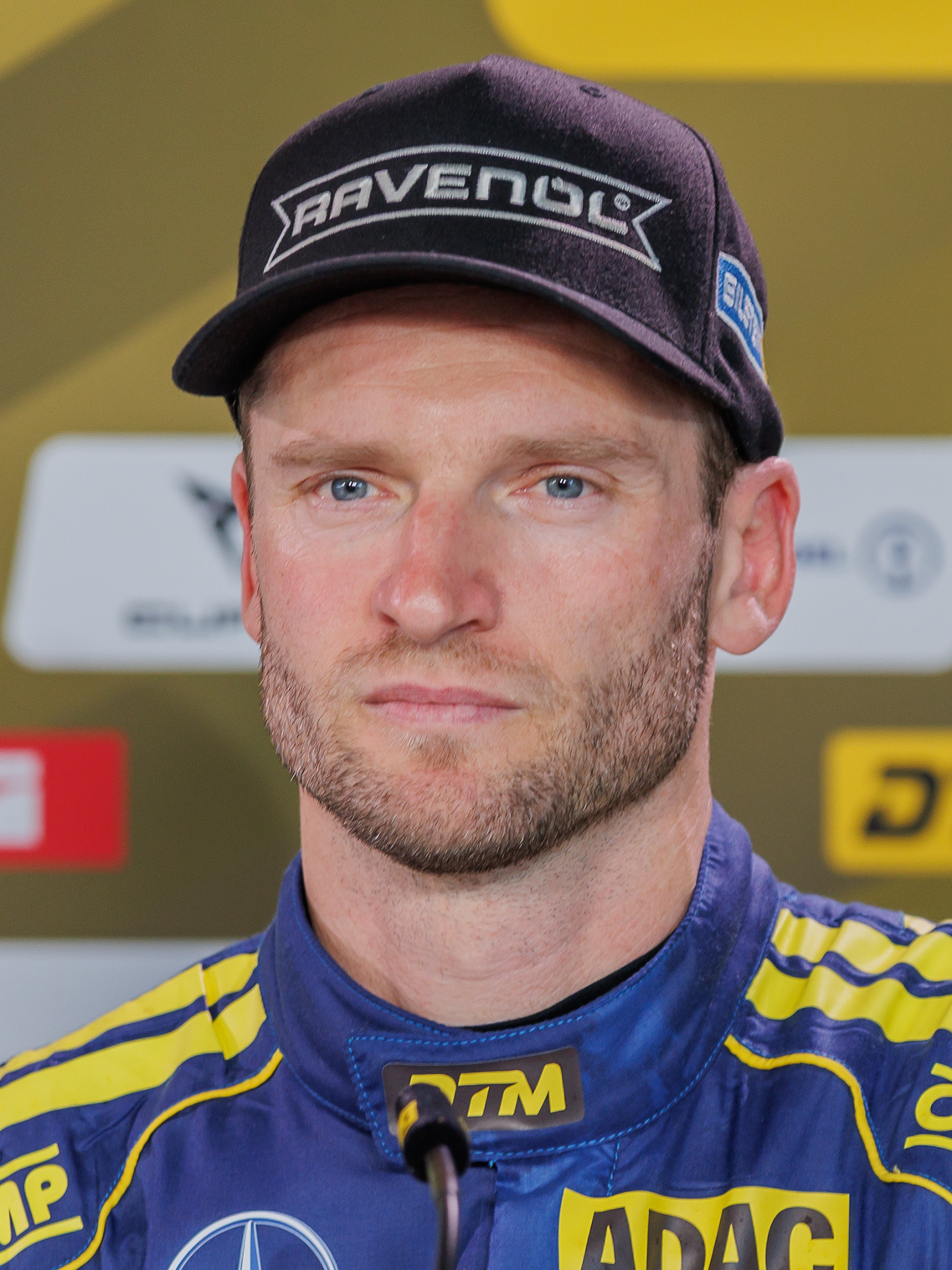
- Engel in 2025
- Nationality: (Germany) German
- Born: Maro René Engel; 27 August 1985 (age 41) Munich, West Germany

Deutsche Tourenwagen Masters career
- Current team: Mercedes-AMG Team Winward
- Categorisation: FIA Platinum

Formula E career
- Debut season: 2016–17
- Current team: Venturi Grand Prix
- Car number: 5
- Starts: 23
- Championships: 0
- Wins: 0
- Poles: 0
- Fastest laps: 2
- Best finish: 12th in 2017–18
- Finished last season: 12th

Maro René Engel (born 27 August 1985) is a German professional racing driver. He is a Mercedes-AMG factory driver since 2008 and a brand ambassador since 2017.

Engel has won the Macau GT Cup four times (2014, 2015, 2022, 2024), the Nürburgring 24 Hours twice (2016, 2026), and the Suzuka 10 Hours (2018), Blancpain GT Series Endurance Cup (2018), GT World Challenge Europe Sprint Cup (2024) and Bathurst 12 Hour once (2026). Additionally, Engel was overall GT World Challenge Europe champion in 2024, and is a three-time Deutsche Tourenwagen Masters (DTM) race winner and two-time 24 Hours of Daytona class winner.

Engel currently competes in DTM, GT World Challenge Europe, IMSA, Intercontinental GT Challenge and the FIA GT World Cup. Over his career he has raced in a variety of different series: in Formula 3, V8 Supercars, FIA Formula E and the three eras of the DTM.

Engel holds the Nürburgring Nordschleife lap record for road-legal production cars since September 2024, setting a lap time of 6:29.090 driving the Mercedes-AMG ONE, surpassing the previous record by over six seconds. He also holds the pole lap record for the Bathurst 12 Hour since 2023.

== Racing career ==
=== Early career ===
Born in Munich, Engel competed in karting in Germany and France between 1996 and 1999 and finished fourth in the 2000 European Junior Karting Championship. He then moved onto Formula BMW, finishing third in the 2001 Junior Cup, before finishing eighth in Formula BMW ADAC the following year.

=== Formula Three (2003–2007) ===
After short spells in Formula Three in 2003-2004, and Italian Formula 3000 in 2005, Engel competed in full seasons in British series in 2006 and 2007, in 2006 receiving backing from Direxiv. In 2007, he was signed as a Mercedes-Benz Junior driving for Carlin Motorsport. He finished fifth with one victory in 2006, and was runner-up to Marko Asmer in 2007 with three wins.

=== Deutsche Tourenwagen Masters (2008–2011) ===
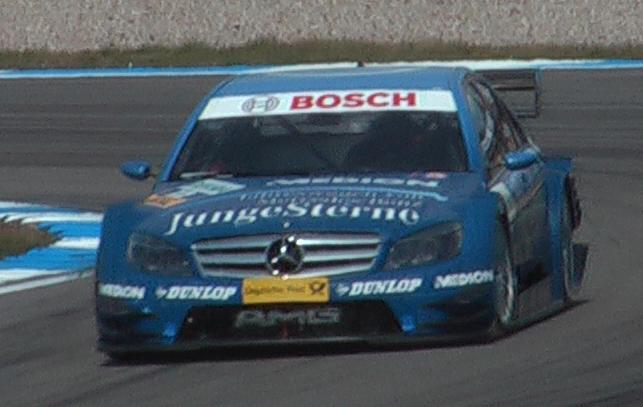
Engel driving at Hockenheim in the 2008 Deutsche Tourenwagen Masters season.

In 2008, Engel was signed as a factory driver by AMG Mercedes to drive a one-year-old car run by Mücke Motorsport in the Deutsche Tourenwagen Masters for the 2008 season. He remained with the team 2011 season. In four years racing in the category, he achieved a best result of sixth place at first round held at the Hockenheimring in 2009. He went on to finish the 2009 season in twelfth place over all, scoring eight points.

=== GT Racing (2012) ===
After leaving DTM, Engel spent the 2012 year making several guest appearances in selected sports car racing championships worldwide as a member of the AMG Customer Sports team, winning the fifth round of the 2012 Australian GT Championship at the Phillip Island Grand Prix Circuit, driving a Mercedes-Benz SLS AMG GT3 prepared by Erebus Racing.

=== V8 Supercars (2013) ===
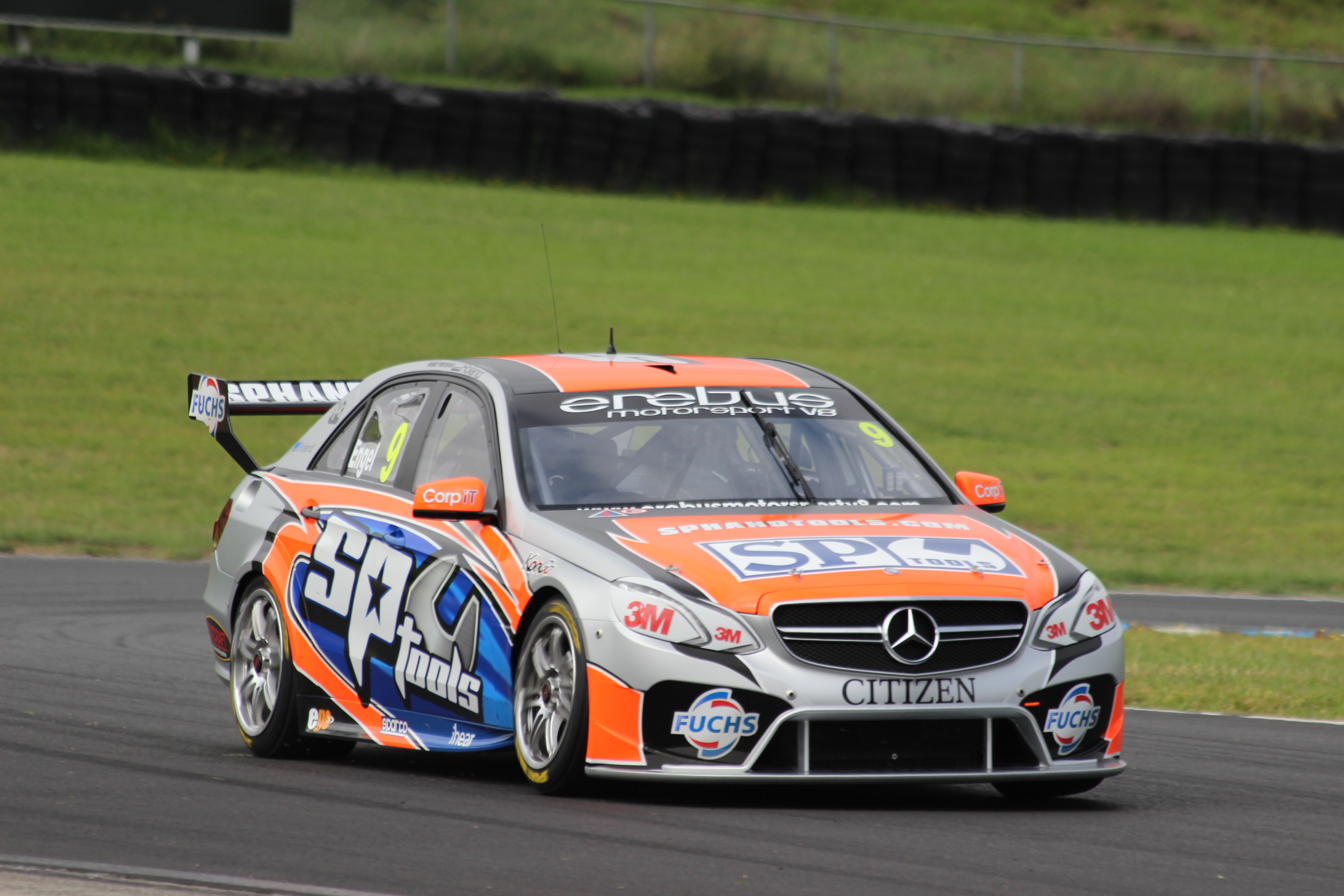
Engel testing a Erebus Mercedes E63 AMG for the V8 Supercar Championship

Engel made his V8 Supercar debut in 2013, driving a Erebus Mercedes E63 AMG entered by Erebus Motorsport (formerly known as Stone Brothers Racing). Engel replaced Shane van Gisbergen as the driver of the No. 9 SP Tools entry. Engel had five race retirements. His best finish was a ninth place in a hastily prepared under developed car at the third race of the Darwin round.

=== Macau Grand Prix GT Cup (2013) ===
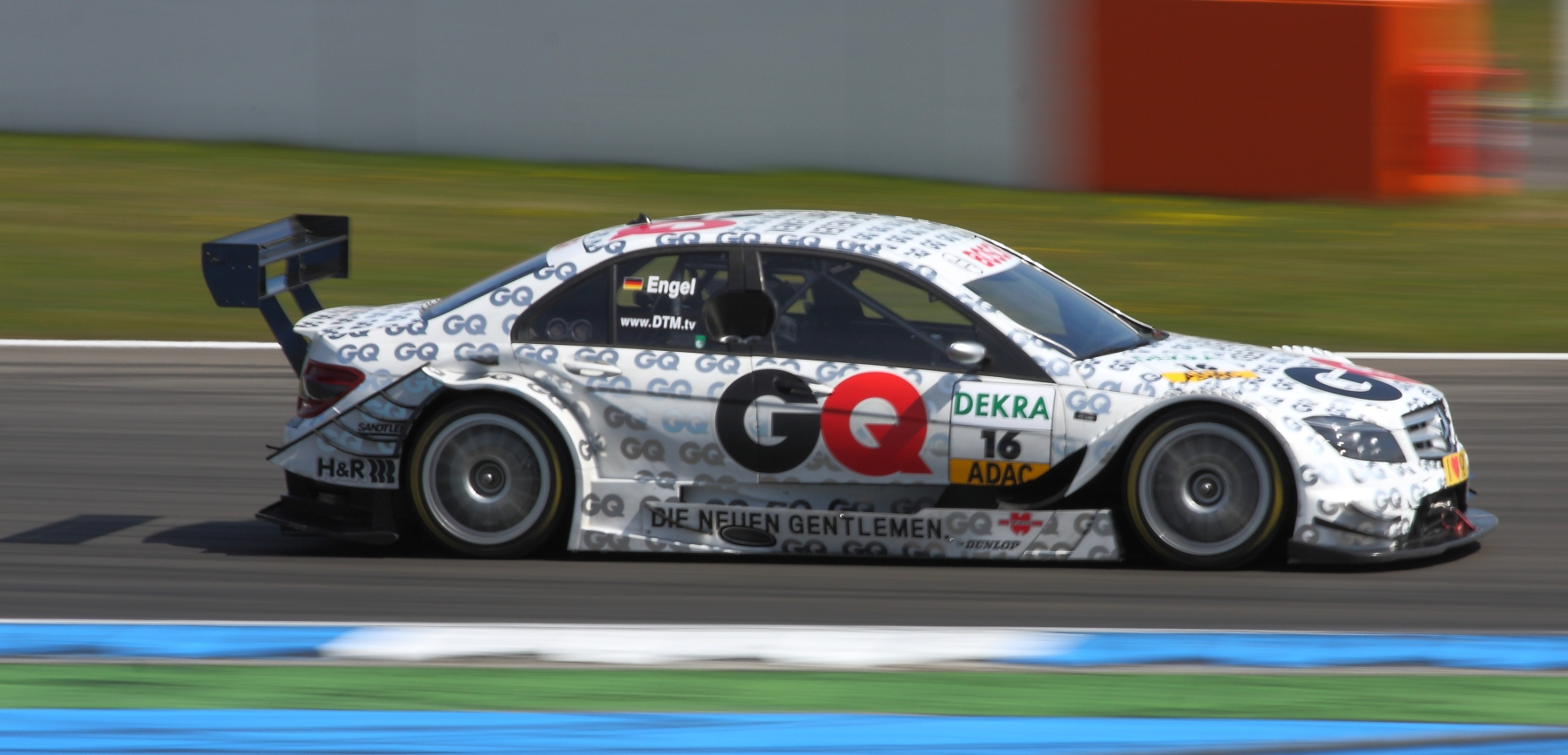
Engel captured in his Mercedes-AMG DTM C-Class

Next to his commitments in V8 Supercar for Erebus Motorsport, Engel competed in the 2013 Macau GT Cup with a Mercedes-Benz SLS AMG GT3 scoring pole position and a lap record in qualifying. Narrowly missing out on the victory due to sustaining a puncture on the front left while leading, two laps before the end.

=== GT Racing (2014) ===
In 2014, Engel resumed his duties as a member of the AMG Customer Sports team racing exclusively with the Mercedes-Benz SLS AMG GT3. Making his debut in the Bathurst 12 Hour racing for Erebus Motorsport together with Bernd Schneider and Nico Bastian, Engel scored pole position with a lap record of 2min03.8586 and winning the inaugural Allan Simonsen Pole Position Trophy. The German trio dominated the race for nine hours before an issue forced them to pit for repairs dropping them seven laps down. He participated in his first 24 Hours Nürburgring racing for German team ROWE Racing finishing the "Hardest race in the World" in third place together with his teammates Nico Bastian Christian Hohenadel and Michael Zehe.

Engel also competed in various VLN races for ROWE Racing winning the ninth round of the VLN championship. He also raced in the German ADAC GT Masters series for ROWE Racing.

=== Macau Grand Prix GT Cup (2014) ===
Racing for the Mercedes-AMG Driving Academy team in a Mercedes-Benz SLS AMG GT3 Engel returned to Macau winning the 2014 Macau GT Cup ahead of his teammate Renger van der Zande scoring a 1-2 win in the gambling capital against Audi, BMW, Porsche and other factory teams and drivers.

=== GT Racing (2015) ===
Engel continued racing with and for the AMG Customer Sports team in the Mercedes-Benz SLS AMG GT3. He was also part of the Mercedes-AMG drivers that assisted development of the new Mercedes-AMG GT3.

=== FIA GT World Cup (2015) ===
In 2015, the Macau GT Cup was recognised by the FIA as the FIA GT World Cup lifting its status to the World Cup for GT3 cars. Engel returned with his Mercedes-AMG Driving Academy team in the successful Mercedes-Benz SLS AMG GT3. Engel won the twelve-lap qualification race from third on the grid after Stefan Mücke was penalised for a Safety car procedure infringement. Starting from pole position in the eighteen-lap race, Engel won the race and was crowned the inaugural FIA GT World Cup Champion. Through Engel's victory combined with the fourth-place finish of his teammate Renger van der Zande, Mercedes-Benz won the inaugural FIA GT Manufacturers World Cup.

=== GT Racing (2016) ===
Racing for Mercedes-AMG Team Black Falcon in the new Mercedes-AMG GT3, Engel took overall victory at the Nürburgring 24 hours together with his teammates Bernd Schneider (racing driver) Adam Christodoulou and Manuel Metzger. Engel made the decisive pass to win the race on the last lap. His winning margin was the tightest in the history of the race with merely 5,6s separating the first two cars. Engel was also the first winner of the SCG Pole position trophy after scoring pole position for the Nürburgring 24 hour race in drying track conditions with a lap of 8 minutes 14.563 in the No. 9 Mercedes-AMG GT3 with which Engel also raced performing a double start duty and finishing the race in fourth position with this second car.

Following two victories in 2014 and 2015 in Macau, Engel finished third at the 2016 FIA GT World Cup,

=== Formula E ===
In August 2016, Engel joined Venturi Grand Prix to make his debut in the 2016-17 season. In his second season, Engel finished 12th in the driver standings, scoring a best result of fourth at the Paris ePrix.

=== Deutsche Tourenwagen Masters (2017) ===
In 2017, Engel rejoined the DTM with Mercedes-Benz, taking his maiden DTM win at the Moscow Raceway.

=== GT Racing (2018) ===
In 2018, racing for Mercedes-AMG Team Black Falcon, Engel went on to win the prestigious Blancpain Endurance Series title with his co-drivers, Luca Stolz and Yelmer Buurmann. Racing for Mercedes-AMG Team GruppeM, he went on to win the Suzuka 10h Intercontinental GT Challenge round sharing the car with Raffaele Marciello and Tristan Vautier.

Racing for Mercedes-AMG Team Black Falcon, Engel finished second at the Nurburgring 24h with his team mates Adam Christodoulou, Manuel Metzger and Dirk Mueller.

At the FIA GT World Cup in Macau, Engel finished second with his Mercedes-AMG GT3 behind the winning BMW M6 GT3 of Augusto Farfus.

=== GT Racing (2019) ===
In 2019, Engel finished runner up in the Blancpain GT Series, Overall and Sprint championships as well as third in the Endurance championship racing for Mercedes-AMG Team Black Falcon with his team mates Luca Stolz (sprint & endurance) and Yelmer Buurmann (endurance). He also scored Pole Position for the Nurburgring and Spa 24h races, a feat which had not been done by any current GT driver scoring pole position for the two biggest GT only Sportscar races in the world in the same year. Together with Yelmer Buurmann and Luca Stolz, he finished the Spa 24h race in third place.

=== GT Racing (2020) ===
In 2020, Engel finished third in the ADAC GT Masters championship racing for Mercedes-AMG team Toksport and sharing the car with his team mate Luca Stolz, they were in contention for the title until the final race but had to contend with third place in the final rankings. Engel also scored his second consecutive pole position for the Nurburgring 24h race scoring his third SCG Pole Position award making him the driver with the most pole awards since its inception.

=== GT Racing (2021) ===
In 2021, Engel won the Daytona 24h race in the GTD class racing for Winward Racing together with Philipp Ellis, Indy Dontje and team owner Russell Ward. It marked the first class win for Mercedes-AMG at the legendary Daytona 24h race.

Racing for Mercedes-AMG team Toksport (sprint) and Mercedes-AMG team HRT (endurance), Engel finished runner up in the GT World Challenge sprint championship and third in the GT World Challenge Overall championship together with his team mate Luca Stolz.

In the ADAC GT Masters championship in a repeat scenario from the previous year, Engel and team mate Luca Stolz racing for Mercedes-AMG team Toksport were in contention until the final race but had to contend with third in the final rankings after a controversial penalty in the final race while leading and on course to take the championship.

=== GT Racing (2022) ===
In 2022, Engel won his third Macau Gran Prix GT Cup racing for Mercedes-AMG team Craft Bamboo. He also finished second at the Bathurst 12h with team mates Daniel Juncadella and Kevin Tse. At the Nurburgring 24h, Engel finished third racing for Mercedes-AMG team Getspeed together with his team mates Daniel Juncadella and Jules Gounon. At the Sebring 12h, Engel finished third in GTD PRO racing with Jules Gounon and Cooper McNeil for Weathertech Racing. After a five year break, Engel returned to DTM in under its new GT3 regulations scoring one pole position and two podiums.

=== GT Racing (2023) ===
In 2023, Engel took his second class win in the Daytona 24h winning the GTD Pro class for Weathertech Racing together with team mates Jules Gounon, Daniel Juncadella and team owner Cooper McNeil. Later that year. he also took the class win at the Petit Le Mans 10h and third at the Sebring 12h in GTD PRO for Weathertech Racing, once again with Gounon and Juncadella.

At the Bathurst 12h, Engel scored Pole Position setting a new qualifying track record of 2min00,8819 on the way to taking his second Allan Simonsen Pole award driving for Mercedes-AMG team GruppeM. In the race the following day together with team mates Raffaele Marciello and Mikael Grenier he finished in third place after the crew was forced to change a organizer supplied modem at the last pitstop which stopped working, dropping them from a comfortable lead to second place. In the final stint, Engel collided with his Daytona winning team mate Jules Gounon while fighting to regain the lead. Following the contact, Engel received a drive through penalty and dropped to third place. In the remaining 30 minutes, Engel closed down the gap to the leaders and the finish was the closest finish in Bathurst 12h history with the top three cars covered by 1,4177s.

In DTM, Engel took one pole position and one win in what was a difficult year for the Mercedes-AMG cars as a whole.

In GT World Challenge Endurance, Engel finished third in the Endurance championship racing for Mercedes-AMG team Getspeed (season except Spa 24h)and Mercedes-AMG team GruppeM (Spa 24h).

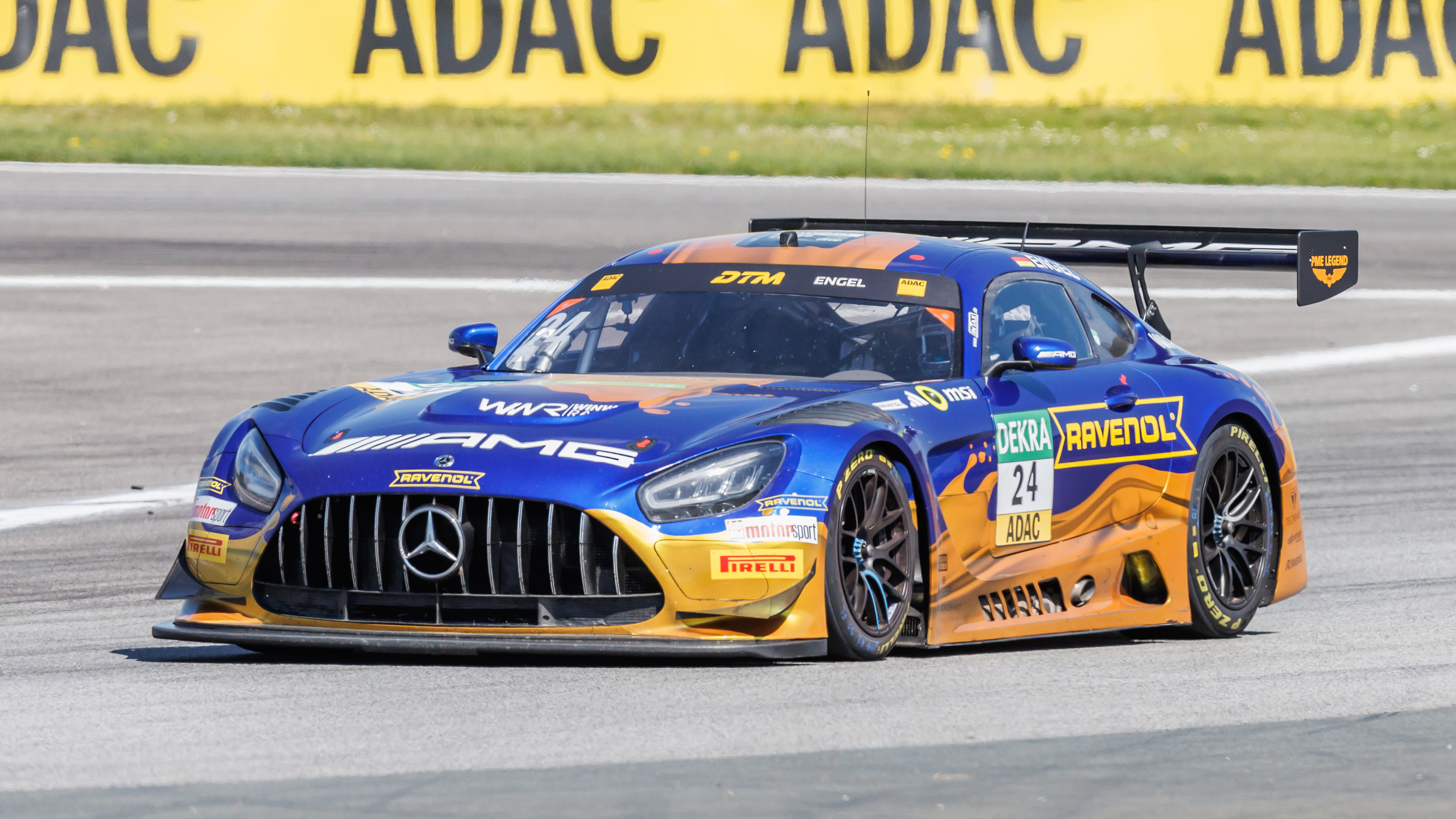
Engel at Motorsport Arena Oschersleben in 2025

At the FIA GT World Cup in Macau, racing for Mercedes-AMG team Craft Bamboo, Engel qualified in third place and finished the qualifying race in second place behind brand mate Raffaele Marciello. In the main race, Engel suffered a shifting issue while running in second place which forced him to retire from the race.

=== GT Racing (2024) ===
2024 saw Engel open his year at the 24 Hours of Daytona alongside Luca Stolz, Jules Gounon, and SunEnergy1 Racing team owner Kenny Habul. During the seventh hour, their AMG GT3 ran into issues, and after repeated trips to the garage, was finally retired after 193 laps completed. He would fare better in the Bathurst 12 Hour, finishing eighth in the No. 130 GruppeM Racing AMG with Felipe Fraga and David Reynolds. However, he would suffer further retirements at both the Nürburgring 24 Hours and 24 Hours of Spa.

In DTM, Engel was embroiled in a title fight with Mirko Bortolotti and Kelvin van der Linde. Despite not winning a race, he would finish the season in third, with one pole, five runner-up finishes, and seven podiums.

Engel joined Winward Racing, entered as Winward Racing Team Mann-Filter in the Sprint Cup and Mercedes-AMG Team Mann-Filter in the Endurance Cup, for the GT World Challenge Europe season. He and Lucas Auer were fighting for the Sprint Cup with Team WRT's Dries Vanthoor and Charles Weerts, eventually coming out on top by 2.5 points with three wins and six podiums. Both would take the GT World Challenge Europe title over Vanthoor and Weerts as well by the same margin. The two of them, along with Daniel Morad, would find less success in the Endurance Cup, scoring a podium at Nürburgring and victory at the final race at Jeddah to finish sixth in the standings.

Engel went on to take his second victory at the GT World Cup.

Engel was brought into the No. 30 Craft-Bamboo Racing entry to replace Daniel Morad for rounds 2 and 3 of GT World Challenge Asia at Buriram and Fuji, respectively. He would end up scoring points in both races at Fuji, finishing second in the latter alongside Cao Qi.

== Commitment ==
Engel is a member of the 'Champions for Peace' club, a group of 80 famous elite athletes including Novak Djokovic and Sergey Bubka among others, committed to serving peace in the world through sport, created by Peace and Sport, a Monaco-based international organization.

== Racing record ==
=== Career summary ===
Season	Series	Team	Races	Wins	Poles	F/laps	Podiums	Points	Position
2001	Formula BMW Junior	ADAC e.V. Motorsport	20	3	5	2	9	203	**3rd**
2002	Formula BMW ADAC	Eifelland Racing	18	1	1	0	4	89	8th
2003	Formula 3 Euro Series	Opel Team KMS	8	0	0	0	0	0	31st
2004	German Formula Three Championship	Seyffarth Motorsport	2	0	0	0	0	7	15th
2005	Italian Formula 3000 Championship	Durango	5	0	0	1	0	17	7th
2006	Macau Grand Prix	Carlin Motorsport	1	0	0	0	0	—N/a	9th
2006	Masters of Formula 3	Carlin Motorsport	1	0	0	0	0	—N/a	15th
2006	British Formula 3 International Series	Carlin Motorsport	22	1	3	2	8	174	5th
2007	Masters of Formula 3	Carlin Motorsport	1	0	0	0	0	—N/a	13th
2007	British Formula 3 International Series	Carlin Motorsport	22	3	4	1	8	208	**2nd**
2008	Deutsche Tourenwagen Masters	Mücke Motorsport	11	0	0	0	0	0	16th
2009	Deutsche Tourenwagen Masters	Mücke Motorsport	10	0	0	0	0	8	12th
2010	Deutsche Tourenwagen Masters	Mücke Motorsport	11	0	0	0	0	3	15th
2011	Deutsche Tourenwagen Masters	Mücke Motorsport	10	0	0	0	0	5	13th
2012	International GT Open	Lapidus Racing	2	0	0	0	0	0	NC
2012	Australian GT Championship	Erebus Racing	2	1	1	1	2	0	NC
2013	Macau GT Cup	Erebus Racing	1	0	1	0	0	—N/a	DNF
2013	MSS Security V8 Supercars Challenge	Erebus Racing	4	0	0	0	0	55	25th
2013	International V8 Supercars Championship	Erebus Racing	37	0	0	0	0	836	28th
2013	Pirtek Endurance Cup	Erebus Racing	4	0	0	0	0	231	22nd
2014	ADAC GT Masters	Rowe Racing	16	0	0	0	0	79	12th
2014	24 Hours of Nürburgring - SP9	Rowe Racing	1	0	0	0	1	—N/a	**3rd**
2014	Macau GT Cup	Mercedes-AMG Driving Academy	1	1	0	0	1	—N/a	**1st**
2015	Blancpain Endurance Series - Pro-Am	Black Falcon	4	0	0	2	1	30	13th
2015	24 Hours of Nürburgring - SP9	Rowe Racing	1	0	0	0	0	—N/a	DNF
2015	FIA GT World Cup	Mercedes-AMG Driving Academy	2	2	1	0	2	—N/a	**1st**
2016	IMSA SportsCar Championship - PC	Starworks Motorsport	2	0	0	0	0	26	27th
2016	Blancpain GT Series Endurance Cup	AMG - Team Black Falcon	5	0	0	0	0	0	NC
2016	24 Hours of Nürburgring - SP9	AMG - Team Black Falcon	1	1	1	1	1	—N/a	**1st**
2016	Intercontinental GT Challenge	AMG - Team Black Falcon	1	0	0	0	0	6	15th
2016	Intercontinental GT Challenge	Erebus Motorsport	1	0	0	0	0	6	15th
2016	24H Series - A6-Pro	Abu Dhabi Racing Black Falcon	1	0	0	0	0	0	NC
2016	GT Asia Series	Mercedes-AMG Driving Academy-Team AAI	2	0	0	0	0	0	NC
2016	FIA GT World Cup	Mercedes-AMG Driving Academy	2	0	0	0	1	—N/a	**3rd**
2016-17	Formula E Championship	Venturi Formula E Team	11	0	0	2	0	16	17th
2017	Deutsche Tourenwagen Masters	Mercedes-AMG Motorsport SILBERPFEIL Energy	18	1	0	0	1	51	15th
2017	IMSA SportsCar Championship - GTD	SunEnergy1 Racing	1	0	0	0	0	13	77th
2017	Blancpain GT Series Endurance Cup	Black Falcon	1	0	0	0	0	0	NC
2017	24H Series - A6	Black Falcon	1	0	0	0	1	26	NC
2017	Intercontinental GT Challenge	Mercedes-AMG Team STM/HTP Motorsport	1	0	0	0	0	0	NC
2017	24 Hours of Nürburgring - SP9	Mercedes-AMG Team Black Falcon	1	0	0	0	0	—N/a	5th
2017	FIA GT World Cup	Mercedes-AMG Team GruppeM Racing	2	0	0	1	1	—N/a	**3rd**
2017-18	Formula E Championship	Venturi Formula E Team	12	0	0	0	0	31	12th
2018	ADAC GT Masters	AutoArenA Motorsport	2	0	0	0	0	0	NC
2018	24 Hours of Nürburgring - SP9	Mercedes-AMG Team Black Falcon	1	0	0	0	1	—N/a	**2nd**
2018	Blancpain GT Series Endurance Cup	Mercedes-AMG Team Black Falcon	5	1	1	1	2	73	**1st**
2018	IMSA SportsCar Championship - GTD	SunEnergy1 Racing	2	0	0	0	0	43	42nd
2018	Intercontinental GT Challenge	Mercedes-AMG Team Black Falcon	1	0	0	0	1	58	4th
2018	Intercontinental GT Challenge	Mercedes-AMG Team GruppeM Racing	1	1	1	0	1	58	4th
2018	Intercontinental GT Challenge	Mercedes-AMG Team SunEnergy1 Racing	1	0	0	0	1	58	4th
2018	FIA GT World Cup	Mercedes-AMG Team GruppeM Racing	2	0	0	0	2	—N/a	**2nd**
2019	ADAC GT Masters	Toksport WRT	4	0	0	0	2	0	NC†
2019	Blancpain GT World Challenge Europe	Black Falcon	10	1	1	2	5	92.5	**2nd**
2019	Blancpain GT Series Endurance Cup	Mercedes-AMG Team Black Falcon	5	0	1	0	2	51	**3rd**
2019	24 Hours of Nürburgring - SP9	Mercedes-AMG Team Black Falcon	1	0	1	0	0	—N/a	DNF
2019	Intercontinental GT Challenge	Mercedes-AMG Team Craft Bamboo Black Falcon	1	0	0	0	0	44	11th
2019	Intercontinental GT Challenge	Mercedes-AMG Team GruppeM Racing	3	0	0	0	1	44	11th
2019	Intercontinental GT Challenge	Mercedes-AMG Team Black Falcon	1	0	1	0	1	44	11th
2019	FIA GT World Cup	Mercedes-AMG Team GruppeM Racing	2	0	0	0	0	—N/a	9th
2020	ADAC GT Masters	Toksport WRT	14	1	1	1	6	167	**3rd**
2020	24H GT Series - GT3-Pro	Toksport WRT	1	0	1	1	0	12	12th
2020	GT World Challenge Europe Sprint Cup	Haupt Racing Team	8	1	1	1	3	60	6th
2020	GT World Challenge Europe Endurance Cup	Haupt Racing Team	4	0	0	0	1	40	7th
2020	Intercontinental GT Challenge	Mercedes-AMG Team Craft Bamboo Black Falcon	1	0	0	0	0	20	11th
2020	Intercontinental GT Challenge	Mercedes-AMG Team HRT	1	0	0	0	0	20	11th
2020	24 Hours of Nürburgring - SP9	Mercedes-AMG Team HRT	1	0	1	0	0	—N/a	8th
2021	ADAC GT Masters	BWT Toksport WRT	14	0	0	0	6	176	**3rd**
2021	GT World Challenge Europe Sprint Cup	Mercedes-AMG Team Toksport	10	4	2	2	6	95	**2nd**
2021	GT World Challenge Europe Endurance Cup	BWT Haupt Racing Team	5	0	0	0	1	25	12th
2021	Intercontinental GT Challenge	Mercedes-AMG Team HRT	1	0	0	0	0	0	NC
2021	Intercontinental GT Challenge	Mercedes-AMG Team Craft Bamboo Racing	1	0	0	0	0	0	NC
2021	IMSA SportsCar Championship - GTD	HTP Winward Motorsport	3	1	0	0	1	1035	26th
2021	IMSA SportsCar Championship - GTD	SunEnergy1 Racing	2	0	0	0	0	1035	26th
2021	24H GT Series - GT3-Pro	Mercedes-AMG Team HRT Bilstein	1	0	0	0	1	0	NC†
2021	24 Hours of Nürburgring - SP9	Mercedes-AMG Team HRT Bilstein	1	0	0	0	0	—N/a	DNF
2022	Deutsche Tourenwagen Masters	Mercedes-AMG Team GruppeM Racing	16	0	1	1	2	65	12th
2022	ADAC GT Masters	Mann-Filter Team Landgraf	2	1	2	1	2	51	22nd
2022	GT World Challenge Europe Endurance Cup	BWT Team GetSpeed Performance	4	0	0	0	1	44	7th
2022	GT World Challenge Europe Endurance Cup	Mercedes-AMG Team GruppeM Racing	1	0	0	0	0	44	7th
2022	IMSA SportsCar Championship - GTD Pro	WeatherTech Racing	3	0	0	1	1	826	12th
2022	Intercontinental GT Challenge	Mercedes-AMG Team Craft-Bamboo Racing	1	0	0	0	1	30	9th
2022	Intercontinental GT Challenge	Mercedes-AMG Team GruppeM Racing	2	0	1	0	0	30	9th
2022	24H GT Series - GT3	SunEnergy1 by SPS automotive performance							
2022	24 Hours of Nürburgring - SP9	Mercedes-AMG Team GetSpeed BWT	1	0	0	0	1	—N/a	**3rd**
2022	Macau GT Cup	Mercedes-AMG Team Craft-Bamboo Racing	2	2	0	0	2	—N/a	**1st**
2023	Deutsche Tourenwagen Masters	Mercedes-AMG Team Mann-Filter	16	1	1	1	1	107	10th
2023	GT World Challenge Europe Endurance Cup	Mercedes-AMG Team Al Manar	4	0	0	0	2	61	**3rd**
2023	GT World Challenge Europe Endurance Cup	Mercedes-AMG Team GruppeM Racing	1	0	0	0	0	61	**3rd**
2023	IMSA SportsCar Championship - GTD Pro	WeatherTech Racing	3	2	1	2	3	1088	8th
2023	Intercontinental GT Challenge	Mercedes-AMG Team GruppeM Racing	5	1	3	1	3	61	6th
2023	24 Hours of Nürburgring - SP9	Mercedes-AMG Team GetSpeed	1	0	0	0	0	—N/a	DNF
2023	FIA GT World Cup	Mercedes-AMG Team Craft-Bamboo Racing	1	0	0	0	0	—N/a	DNF
2024	Deutsche Tourenwagen Masters	Mercedes-AMG Team Winward	16	0	1	1	7	203	**3rd**
2024	GT World Challenge Europe Sprint Cup	Winward Racing	10	3	1	1	8	107	**1st**
2024	GT World Challenge Europe Endurance Cup	Mercedes-AMG Team Mann-Filter	5	1	0	1	2	48	6th
2024	IMSA SportsCar Championship - GTD Pro	SunEnergy1 Racing	1	0	0	0	0	201	45th
2024	GT World Challenge Asia	Craft-Bamboo Racing	4	0	0	0	1	20	27th
2024	Intercontinental GT Challenge	Mercedes-AMG Team GruppeM Racing	2	0	0	0	1	21	12th
2024	Intercontinental GT Challenge	Mercedes-AMG Team GetSpeed	1	0	0	0	0	21	12th
2024	Intercontinental GT Challenge	Mercedes-AMG Team Mann-Filter	1	0	0	0	0	21	12th
2024	Nürburgring Langstrecken-Serie - SP9	Mercedes-AMG Team GetSpeed	2	0	0	0	0	3*	40th*
2024	24 Hours of Nürburgring - SP9	Mercedes-AMG Team GetSpeed	1	0	0	0	0	—N/a	DNF
2024	GT World Challenge America - Pro	Mercedes-AMG Team GruppeM Racing	1	0	0	0	1	0	NC†
2024	FIA GT World Cup	Mercedes-AMG Team GruppeM Racing	2	1	0	1	1	—N/a	**1st**
2024-25	Asian Le Mans Series - GT	Winward Racing	6	0	0	0	1	33	9th
2025	Deutsche Tourenwagen Masters	Mercedes-AMG Team Winward	16	0	0	1	4	184	**3rd**
2025	IMSA SportsCar Championship - GTD Pro	75 Express	1	0	0	0	0	186	44th
2025	Intercontinental GT Challenge	Mercedes-AMG Team GMR	2	0	0	0	1	24	16th
2025	Intercontinental GT Challenge	Mercedes-AMG Team GetSpeed	1	0	0	0	0	24	16th
2025	Intercontinental GT Challenge	Mercedes-AMG Team Mann-Filter	1	0	0	0	0	24	16th
2025	Nürburgring Langstrecken-Serie - SP9	Mercedes-AMG Team Bilstein by GetSpeed							
2025	24 Hours of Nürburgring - SP9	Mercedes-AMG Team GetSpeed	1	0	0	0	0	—N/a	DNF
2025	GT World Challenge Europe Endurance Cup	Mercedes-AMG Team Mann-Filter	5	1	1	0	2	72	**2nd**
2025	GT World Challenge Europe Sprint Cup	Winward Racing	10	1	1	2	4	76.5	4th
2025	Gulf 12 Hours	Winward Racing	1	0	0	0	0	N/A	DNF
2025	24H Series - GT3	TFT Racing	1	0	0	0	0	0	NC†
2025-26	24H Series Middle East - GT3	Winward Racing	2	0	0	0	1	48	8th
2026	IMSA SportsCar Championship - GTD Pro	75 Express	1	0	0	0	1	350	32nd
2026	Intercontinental GT Challenge	Mercedes-AMG Team GMR	1	1	0	0	1	68	**2nd**
2026	Intercontinental GT Challenge	Mercedes-AMG Team Ravenol	1	1	0	0	1	68	**2nd**
2026	Intercontinental GT Challenge	Mercedes-AMG Team Mann-Filter	1	0	0	0	1	68	**2nd**
2026	Deutsche Tourenwagen Masters	Mercedes-AMG Team Ravenol	16	3	2	3	6	213	**2nd**
2026	Nürburgring Langstrecken-Serie - SP9	Mercedes-AMG Team Ravenol							
2026	24 Hours of Nürburgring - SP9	Mercedes-AMG Team Ravenol	1	1	0	0	1	—N/a	**1st**
2026	24H Series - GT3	GetSpeed Team PCX Racing	2	0	2	2	1	60	19th
2026	GT World Challenge Europe Endurance Cup	Mercedes-AMG Team Mann-Filter	5	0	1	0	3	86	**1st**
2026	GT World Challenge Europe Sprint Cup	Winward Racing	10	0	0	2	3	45.5	6th
2026	FIA GT World Cup	Craft-Bamboo Racing	0	0	0	0	0	—N/a	TBD

^{†} Guest driver ineligible to score points. ^{*} Season still in progress.

=== Complete Formula Three Euro Series results ===
(key) (Races in bold indicate pole position) (Races in italics indicate fastest lap)

Year	Entrant	Chassis	Engine	1	2	3	4	5	6	7	8	9	10	11	12	13	14	15	16	17	18	19	20	DC	Points
2003	Opel Team KMS	Dallara F302/009	Spiess-Opel	HOC; 1; 12	HOC; 2; 16	ADR; 1; 23	ADR; 2; 24	PAU; 1	PAU; 2	NOR; 1 Ret	NOR; 2; 14	LMS; 1; 20	LMS; 2; 20	NÜR; 1	NÜR; 2	A1R; 1	A1R; 2	ZAN; 1	ZAN; 2	HOC; 1	HOC; 2	MAG; 1	MAG; 2	31st	0

^{†} Driver did not finish the race, but was classified as he completed over 90% of the race distance.

=== Complete Deutsche Tourenwagen Masters results ===
(key) (Races in bold indicate pole position) (Races in italics indicate fastest lap)

Year	Team	Car	1	2	3	4	5	6	7	8	9	10	11	12	13	14	15	16	17	18	Pos.	Points
2008	Mücke Motorsport	AMG-Mercedes C-Klasse 2007	HOC; 17	OSC; Ret	MUG; 11	LAU; 11	NOR; 9	ZAN; 14	NÜR; Ret	BRH; 17	CAT; 13	BUG; 14	HOC; 12								16th	0
2009	Mücke Motorsport	AMG-Mercedes C-Klasse 2008	HOC; 6	LAU; 8	NOR; Ret	ZAN; 7	OSC; 7	NÜR; 12	BRH; 10	CAT; 10	DIJ; 12	HOC; 10									12th	8
2010	Mücke Motorsport	AMG-Mercedes C-Klasse 2009	HOC; 16	VAL; 11	LAU; 15	NOR; 9	NÜR; 8	ZAN; Ret	BRH; 11	OSC; 12	HOC; 9	ADR; 7	SHA; 16								15th	3
2011	Mücke Motorsport	AMG-Mercedes C-Klasse 2008	HOC; 8	ZAN; 7	SPL; 14	LAU; 10	NOR; 9	NÜR; 15	BRH; 10	OSC; 7	VAL; 15	HOC; 14									13th	5
2017	Mercedes-AMG Motorsport SILBERPFEIL Energy	AMG-Mercedes C63 Coupé 2017	HOC; 1; 17	HOC; 2; 10	LAU; 1; 9	LAU; 2; 12	HUN; 1; 13	HUN; 2; 15	NOR; 1; 14	NOR; 2; 14	MSC; 1; 10	MSC; 2; 1	ZAN; 1; 16	ZAN; 2; 11	NÜR; 1; 4	NÜR; 2; 5	SPL; 1; 15	SPL; 2; 15	HOC; 1; 16	HOC; 2; 13	15th	51
2022	Mercedes-AMG Team GruppeM Racing	Mercedes-AMG GT3 Evo	ALG; 1; 10	ALG; 2; 10	LAU; 1; 5^{3}	LAU; 2; 2^{3}	IMO; 1; 10	IMO; 2; 7	NOR; 1 Ret	NOR; 2; 10	NÜR; 1; 16	NÜR; 2 Ret	SPA; 1 Ret	SPA; 2; 23	RBR; 1; 7	**RBR**; **2**; 3^{1}	HOC; 1; 11	HOC; 2 Ret			12th	65
2023	Mercedes-AMG Team Landgraf	Mercedes-AMG GT3 Evo	OSC; 1; 13	OSC; 2; 14	**ZAN**; **1**; 1^{1}	ZAN; 2; 5^{3}	NOR; 1; 7	NOR; 2; 9	NÜR; 1; 12	NÜR; 2; 4	LAU; 1; 13	LAU; 2 Ret	SAC; 1 Ret	SAC; 2 Ret	RBR; 1; 5	RBR; 2; 12	HOC; 1; 17	HOC; 2; 5			10th	107
2024	Mercedes-AMG Team Winward	Mercedes-AMG GT3 Evo	OSC; 1; 13	OSC; 2; 2	LAU; 1; 2	LAU; 2; 7	ZAN; 1; 11	ZAN; 2; 13	NOR; 1; 8	NOR; 2; 2^{3}	NÜR; 1; 3	**NÜR**; **2**; 2^{1}	SAC; 1; 3	SAC; 2; 5	RBR; 1; 2^{3}	RBR; 2; 8	HOC; 1; 4	HOC; 2; 10			3rd	203
2025	Mercedes-AMG Team Winward	Mercedes-AMG GT3 Evo	OSC; 1; 3	OSC; 2; 12	LAU; 1; 2^{3}	LAU; 2; 5	ZAN; 1; 9^{2}	ZAN; 2; 5	NOR; 1; 3	NOR; 2; 4	NÜR; 1 Ret	NÜR; 2; 4	SAC; 1; 9	SAC; 2; 6	RBR; 1; 5	RBR; 2; 4	HOC; 1; 4	HOC; 2; 3			3rd	184
2026	Mercedes-AMG Team Ravenol	Mercedes-AMG GT3 Evo	**RBR**; **1**; 3^{1}	RBR; 2; 1	ZAN; 1; 6	ZAN; 2; 4	LAU; 1; 15	LAU; 2; 7	NOR; 1; 2^{2}	NOR; 2; 7	OSC; 1; 3^{3}	OSC; 2; 1	NÜR; 1; 6	NÜR; 2 Ret	SAC; 1; 5	**SAC**; **2**; 17^{1}	HOC; 1; 4	HOC; 2; 1^{3}			2nd	213

=== Supercars Championship results ===
V8 Supercar results
Year	Team	No.	Car	1	2	3	4	5	6	7	8	9	10	11	12	13	14	15	16	17	18	19	20	21	22	23	24	25	26	27	28	29	30	31	32	33	34	35	36	Pos.	Pts
2013	Erebus Motorsport	9	Mercedes-Benz E63 AMG	ADE; R1; 24	ADE; R2; Ret	SYM; R3; Ret	SYM; R4; 24	SYM; R5; 23	PUK; R6; 24	PUK; R7; 21	PUK; R8; 20	PUK; R9; 21	BAR; R10; 25	BAR; R11; 26	BAR; R12; Ret	COA; R13; 23	COA; R14; Ret	COA; R15; 24	COA; R16; 25	HID; R17; 16	HID; R18; 22	HID; R19; 9	TOW; R20; 19	TOW; R21; 27	QLD; R22; 19	QLD; R23; 27	QLD; R24; 17	WIN; R25; 18	WIN; R26; 17	WIN; R27; 19	SAN; R28; 25	BAT; R29; 20	SUR; R30; 21	SUR; R31; 22	PHI; R32; 21	PHI; R33; 22	PHI; R34; 19	SYD; R35; Ret	SYD; R36; 20	28th	836

=== Bathurst 1000 results ===
Year	No.	Team	Car	Co-driver	Position	Laps
2013	9	Erebus Motorsport	Mercedes-Benz E63 AMG	(Australia) Steven Johnson	20th	160

=== Complete Bathurst 12 Hour results ===
Year	Team	Co-drivers	Car	Class	Laps	Pos.	Class pos.
2014	(Australia) Erebus Motorsport	(Germany) Nico Bastian (Germany) Bernd Schneider	Mercedes-Benz SLS AMG	A	291	7th	7th
2016	(Australia) Erebus Motorsport	(United States) Austin Cindric (Germany) Bernd Schneider	Mercedes-Benz SLS AMG	AP	219	DNF	
2017	(Australia) Scott Taylor Motorsports	(New Zealand) Craig Baird (New Zealand) Shane van Gisbergen	Mercedes AMG GT3	AA	283	DNF	
2019	(Hong Kong) Craft-Bamboo Racing	(United Kingdom) Gary Paffett (Germany) Luca Stolz	Mercedes AMG GT3	APP	185	DNF	
2020	(Hong Kong) Craft-Bamboo Racing	(Netherlands) Yelmer Buurman (Germany) Luca Stolz	Mercedes AMG GT3 Evo	Pro	314	5th	5th
2022	(Hong Kong) Craft-Bamboo Racing	(Spain) Daniel Juncadella (Macau) Kevin Tse	Mercedes AMG GT3 Evo	APA	291	**2nd**	**2nd**
2023	(Hong Kong) GruppeM Racing	(Canada) Mikaël Grenier (Switzerland) Raffaele Marciello	Mercedes AMG GT3 Evo	Pro	323	**3rd**	**3rd**
2024	(Hong Kong) GruppeM Racing	(Brazil) Felipe Fraga (Australia) David Reynolds	Mercedes AMG GT3 Evo	Pro	275	8th	8th
2025	(Hong Kong) Mercedes-AMG Team GMR	(Canada) Mikaël Grenier (Belgium) Maxime Martin	Mercedes AMG GT3 Evo	Pro	170	DNF	
2026	(Hong Kong) Mercedes-AMG Team GMR	(Canada) Mikaël Grenier (Belgium) Maxime Martin	Mercedes AMG GT3 Evo	Pro	262	**1st**	**1st**

=== Complete 24 Hours of Nürburgring results ===
Year	Team	Co-drivers	Car	Class	Laps	Pos.	Class pos.
2014	(Germany) Rowe Racing	(Germany) Nico Bastian (Germany) Christian Hohenadel (Germany) Michel Zehe	Mercedes-Benz SLS AMG GT3	SP9 GT3	157	**3rd**	**3rd**
2015	(Germany) Rowe Racing	(Germany) Thomas Jäger (Germany) Jan Seyffarth (Netherlands) Renger van der Zande	Mercedes-Benz SLS AMG GT3	SP9 GT3	61	DNF	
2016	(Germany) AMG - Team Black Falcon	(United Kingdom) Adam Christodoulou (Germany) Manuel Metzger (Germany) Bernd Schneider	Mercedes-AMG GT3	SP9	134	**1st**	**1st**
2017	(Germany) Mercedes-AMG Team Black Falcon	(Germany) Dirk Müller (Germany) Thomas Jäger (Germany) Jan Seyffarth	Mercedes-AMG GT3	SP9	146	23rd	17th
2018	(Germany) Mercedes-AMG Team Black Falcon	(United Kingdom) Adam Christodoulou (Germany) Manuel Metzger (Germany) Dirk Müller	Mercedes-AMG GT3	SP9	135	**2nd**	**2nd**
2019	(Germany) Mercedes-AMG Team Black Falcon	(United Kingdom) Adam Christodoulou (Germany) Manuel Metzger (Germany) Dirk Müller	Mercedes-AMG GT3	SP9	49	DNF	
2020	(Germany) Mercedes-AMG Team HRT AutoArena	(Germany) Patrick Assenheimer (Austria) Dominik Baumann (Germany) Dirk Müller	Mercedes-AMG GT3 Evo	SP9	85	8th	8th
2021	(Germany) Mercedes-AMG Team HRT	(Germany) Patrick Assenheimer (Germany) Nico Bastian (Germany) Hubert Haupt	Mercedes-AMG GT3 Evo	SP9	46	DNF	
2022	(Germany) Mercedes-AMG Team GetSpeed BWT	(France) Jules Gounon (Spain) Daniel Juncadella	Mercedes-AMG GT3 Evo	SP9 Pro	159	**3rd**	**3rd**
2023	(Germany) Mercedes-AMG Team GetSpeed	(Andorra) Jules Gounon (Spain) Daniel Juncadella	Mercedes-AMG GT3 Evo	SP9 Pro	49	DNF	
2024	(Germany) Mercedes-AMG Team GetSpeed	(United Kingdom) Adam Christodoulou (Andorra) Jules Gounon (Germany) Fabian Schiller	Mercedes-AMG GT3 Evo	SP9 Pro	34	DNF	
2025	(Germany) Mercedes-AMG Team GetSpeed	(Belgium) Maxime Martin (Germany) Fabian Schiller (Germany) Luca Stolz	Mercedes-AMG GT3 Evo	SP9 Pro	41	DNF	
2026	(United States) Mercedes-AMG Team Ravenol	(Belgium) Maxime Martin (Germany) Fabian Schiller (Germany) Luca Stolz	Mercedes-AMG GT3 Evo	SP9 Pro	156	**1st**	**1st**

=== Complete GT World Challenge Europe results ===
==== GT World Challenge Europe Endurance Cup ====
(Races in bold indicate pole position) (Races in italics indicate fastest lap)

Year	Team	Car	Class	1	2	3	4	5	6	7	Pos.	Points
Blancpain Endurance Series
2015	Black Falcon	Mercedes-Benz SLS AMG GT3	Pro-Am	MNZ; 38	SIL; DNS	LEC; 8	SPA; 6H; 30	SPA; 12H; 35	SPA; 24H; Ret	CAT; 24	13th	30
Blancpain GT Series Endurance Cup
2016	Black Falcon	Mercedes-AMG GT3	Pro-Am	MNZ; 18	SIL; 17	LEC; 17				CAT; 21	5th	52
2016	AMG - Team Black Falcon	Mercedes-AMG GT3	Pro				SPA; 6H; 45	SPA; 12H; 27	SPA; 24H; 20		NC	0
2017	Mercedes-AMG Team Black Falcon	Mercedes-AMG GT3	Pro	MNZ	SIL	LEC; Ret	SPA; 6H	SPA; 12H	SPA; 24H	CAT	NC	0
2018	Mercedes-AMG Team Black Falcon	Mercedes-AMG GT3	Pro	MNZ; 3	SIL; 6	LEC; Ret	SPA; 6H; 5	SPA; 12H; 2	SPA; 24H; 5	CAT; 1	1st	73
2019	Mercedes-AMG Team Black Falcon	Mercedes-AMG GT3	Pro	MNZ; 3	SIL; 7	LEC; 15	SPA; 6H; 3	SPA; 12H; 3	SPA; 24H; 3	CAT; 12	3rd	51
GT World Challenge Europe Endurance Cup
2020	Mercedes-AMG Team HRT	Mercedes-AMG GT3 Evo	Pro	IMO; 15	NÜR; 3	SPA; 6H; 12	SPA; 12H; 4	SPA; 24H; 7	LEC; 6		7th	40
2021	BWT Haupt Racing Team	Mercedes-AMG GT3 Evo	Pro	MNZ; 13	LEC; 38	SPA; 6H; 16	SPA; 12H; 15	SPA; 24H; 36	NÜR; 3	CAT; 5	12th	25
2022	AMG Team GetSpeed	Mercedes-AMG GT3 Evo	Pro	IMO; 3	LEC; Ret				HOC; 4	CAT; 8	7th	44
2022	AMG Team GruppeM Racing	Mercedes-AMG GT3 Evo	Pro			SPA; 6H; 10	SPA; 12H; 9	SPA; 24H; 4			7th	44
2023	Mercedes-AMG Team AlManar	Mercedes-AMG GT3 Evo	Pro	MNZ; Ret	LEC; 2				NÜR; 2	CAT; 4	3rd	61
2023	Mercedes-AMG Team GruppeM Racing	Mercedes-AMG GT3 Evo	Pro			SPA; 6H; 19	SPA; 12H; 3	SPA; 24H; Ret			3rd	61
2024	Mercedes-AMG Team Mann-Filter	Mercedes-AMG GT3 Evo	Pro	LEC; 45†	SPA; 6H; 10	SPA; 12H; 35	SPA; 24H; Ret	NÜR; 3	MNZ; 16	JED; 1	6th	48
2025	Mercedes-AMG Team Mann-Filter	Mercedes-AMG GT3 Evo	Pro	**LEC**; 4	MNZ; 1	SPA; 6H; 2	SPA; 12H; 7	SPA; 24H; 10	NÜR; 2	CAT; 13	2nd	72
2026	Mercedes-AMG Team Mann-Filter	Mercedes-AMG GT3 Evo	Pro	**LEC**; 2	MNZ; 2	SPA; 6H; 3	SPA; 12H; 4	SPA; 24H; 2	NÜR; 4	ALG; 14	1st	86

* Season still in progress.

==== Complete GT World Challenge Europe Sprint Cup results ====
(key) (Races in bold indicate pole position; results in italics indicate fastest lap)

Year	Team	Car	Class	1	2	3	4	5	6	7	8	9	10	Pos.	Points
2019	Black Falcon	Mercedes-AMG GT3	Pro	**BRH**; **1**; 2	BRH; 2; 1	MIS; 1; 3	MIS; 2; 4	ZAN; 1; 4	ZAN; 2; 4	NÜR; 1; 8	NÜR; 2; 4	HUN; 1; 2	HUN; 2; 3	2nd	92.5
2020	Haupt Racing Team	Mercedes-AMG GT3 Evo	Pro	MIS; 1; 4	MIS; 2; 2	MIS; 3; 4	**MAG**; **1**; 1	MAG; 2; 3	ZAN; 1	ZAN; 2	CAT; 1; 5	CAT; 2; 17	CAT; 3 Ret	6th	60
2021	Toksport WRT	Mercedes-AMG GT3 Evo	Pro	MAG; 1; 25	**MAG**; **2**; 1	ZAN; 1; 7	ZAN; 2 Ret	MIS; 1; 2	MIS; 2; 24	BRH; 1; 2	BRH; 2; 1	VAL; 1; 1	**VAL**; **2**; 1	2nd	95
2024	Winward Racing Team Mann-Filter	Mercedes-AMG GT3 Evo	Pro	BRH; 1; 3	**BRH**; **2**; 1	MIS; 1; 5	MIS; 2; 2	HOC; 1; 1	HOC; 2; 3	MAG; 1; 2	MAG; 2; 1	CAT; 1; 3	CAT; 2; 4	1st	107
2025	Winward Racing	Mercedes-AMG GT3 Evo	Pro	BRH; 1; 6	**BRH**; **2**; 1	ZAN; 1; 3	ZAN; 2; 9	MIS; 1; 4	MIS; 2; 2	MAG; 1; 4	MAG; 2; 7	VAL; 1; 3	VAL; 2; 6	4th	76.5
2026	Winward Racing	Mercedes-AMG GT3 Evo	Pro	BRH; 1; 6	BRH; 2; 3	MIS; 1; 3	MIS; 2; 3	MAG; 1; 4	MAG; 2; 19	ZAN; 1; 13	ZAN; 2; 8	CAT; 1; 7	CAT; 2; 11	6th	45.5

=== Complete IMSA SportsCar Championship results ===
(key) (Races in bold indicate pole position; results in italics indicate fastest lap)

Year	Team	Class	Make	Engine	1	2	3	4	5	6	7	8	9	10	11	12	Rank	Points
2016	Starworks Motorsport	PC	Oreca FLM09	Chevrolet LS3 6.2 L V8	DAY; 7†	SEB; 7	LBH	LGA	DET	WGL	MOS	LIM	ELK	COA	PET		27th	26
2017	SunEnergy1 Racing	GTD	Mercedes-AMG GT3	Mercedes-AMG M159 6.2 L V8	DAY; 18	SEB	LBH	AUS	BEL	WGL	MOS	LIM	ELK	VIR	LGA	PET	77th	12
2018	SunEnergy1 Racing	GTD	Mercedes-AMG GT3	Mercedes-AMG M159 6.2 L V8	DAY; 8	SEB	MOH; 12	BEL	WGL	MOS	LIM	ELK	VIR	LGA	PET		42nd	43
2021	HTP Winward Motorsport	GTD	Mercedes-AMG GT3 Evo	Mercedes-AMG M159 6.2 L V8	DAY; 1											PET; 11	26th	1035
2021	SunEnergy1 Racing	GTD	Mercedes-AMG GT3 Evo	Mercedes-AMG M159 6.2 L V8		SEB; 9	MDO	DET	WGL; 14	WGL	LIM	ELK	LGA	LBH	VIR		26th	1035
2022	WeatherTech Racing	GTD Pro	Mercedes-AMG GT3 Evo	Mercedes-AMG M159 6.2 L V8	DAY; 11	SEB; 3	LBH	LGA	WGL; 5	MOS	LIM	ELK	VIR	PET			12th	826
2023	WeatherTech Racing	GTD Pro	Mercedes-AMG GT3 Evo	Mercedes-AMG M159 6.2 L V8	**DAY**; 1	SEB; 3	LBH	LGA	WGL	MOS	LIM	ELK	VIR	IMS	PET; 1		8th	1088
2024	SunEnergy1 Racing	GTD Pro	Mercedes-AMG GT3 Evo	Mercedes-AMG M159 6.2 L V8	DAY; 13	SEB	LGA	DET	WGL	MOS	ELK	VIR	IMS	PET			45th	201
2025	75 Express	GTD Pro	Mercedes-AMG GT3 Evo	Mercedes-AMG M159 6.2 L V8	DAY; 15	SEB	LGA	DET	WGL	MOS	ELK	VIR	IMS	PET			44th	186
2026	75 Express	GTD Pro	Mercedes-AMG GT3 Evo	Mercedes-AMG M159 6.2 L V8	DAY; 2	SEB	LGA	DET	WGL	MOS	ELK	VIR	IMS	PET			32nd	350

^{†} Engel did not complete sufficient laps to score full points.

=== Complete Intercontinental GT Challenge results ===
Year	Manufacturer	Car	1	2	3	4	5	Pos.	Points
2016	Mercedes-Benz	Mercedes-Benz SLS AMG GT3	BAT; Ret					15th	6
2016	Mercedes-Benz	Mercedes-AMG GT3		SPA; 7	SEP			15th	6
2017	Mercedes-AMG	Mercedes-AMG GT3	BAT; Ret	SPA	LGA			NC	0
2018	Mercedes-AMG	Mercedes-AMG GT3	BAT	SPA; 2	**SUZ**; 1	LGA; 3		4th	58
2019	Mercedes-AMG	Mercedes-AMG GT3	BAT; Ret	LGA; 6	**SPA**; 2	SUZ; 2	KYA; Ret	11st	44
2020	Mercedes-AMG	Mercedes-AMG GT3 Evo	BAT; 4	IND	SPA; 6	KYA		11st	20
2021	Mercedes-AMG	Mercedes-AMG GT3 Evo	SPA; 19	IND; 13	KYA			NC	0
2022	Mercedes-AMG	Mercedes-AMG GT3 Evo	BAT; 2	SPA; 4	IND	**ABU**; Ret		9th	30
2023	Mercedes-AMG	Mercedes-AMG GT3 Evo	**BAT**; 3	**KYA**; 7	SPA; Ret	IND; 3	**ABU**; 1	6th	61
2024	Mercedes-AMG	Mercedes-AMG GT3 Evo	BAT; 7	NÜR; Ret	SPA; Ret	IND; 3		12nd	21
2025	Mercedes-AMG	Mercedes-AMG GT3 Evo	BAT; Ret	NÜR; Ret	SPA; 7	SUZ	IND; 2	16th	24
2026	Mercedes-AMG	Mercedes-AMG GT3 Evo	BAT; 1	NÜR; 1	SPA; 2	SUZ	IND	2nd	68

^{*} Season still in progress.

=== Complete FIA Formula E Championship results ===
(key) (Races in bold indicate pole position; races in italics indicate fastest lap)

Year	Team	Chassis	Powertrain	1	2	3	4	5	6	7	8	9	10	11	12	Pos	Points
2016–17	Venturi Formula E Team	Spark SRT01-e	Venturi VM200-FE-02	HKG; 9	MRK; NC	BUE; NC	MEX; Ret	MCO; 5	PAR	BER; 9	BER; NC	NYC; NC	NYC; Ret	MTL; 12	MTL; 18	17th	16
2017–18	Venturi Formula E Team	Spark SRT01-e	Venturi VM200-FE-03	HKG; 13	HKG; 7	MRK; 12	SCL; Ret	MEX; 16	PDE; 10	RME; 8	PAR; 4	BER; 8	ZUR; 11	NYC; 8	NYC; Ret	12th	31

Sporting positions
Preceded by Edoardo Mortara	Macau GT Cup/FIA GT World Cup; Winner; 2014-2015	Succeeded by Laurens Vanthoor
Preceded by Mirko Bortolotti; Andrea Caldarelli; Christian Engelhart	Blancpain GT Series Endurance Cup; Champion; 2018; With: Yelmer Buurman & Luca Stolz	Succeeded by Andrea Caldarelli; Marco Mapelli
Preceded by Darryl O'Young	Macau GT Cup; Winner; 2022	Succeeded by Raffaele Marciello (FIA GT World Cup)
Preceded by Mattia Drudi; Ricardo Feller	GT World Challenge Europe Sprint Cup; Champion; 2024; With: Lucas Auer	Succeeded by Kelvin van der Linde; Charles Weerts
Preceded by Raffaele Marciello	FIA GT World Cup; Winner; 2024	Succeeded by Antonio Fuoco
Awards and achievements
Preceded by Inaugural	Allan Simonsen Trophy (Pole position Bathurst 12 Hour); 2014	Succeeded by Laurens Vanthoor
Preceded by Chaz Mostert	Allan Simonsen Trophy (Pole position Bathurst 12 Hour); 2023	Succeeded by Sheldon van der Linde
