= Ablation casting =

Ablation casting is a variation of a sand casting involving a soluble binder. The mold is dissolved and washed away, allowing rapid cooling of the casting.

== Procedure ==
Ablation casting is a sand casting process that uses water to wash away the mold while the metal solidifies. This process produces castings with high mechanical properties, reduced defects, and a fine microstructure.

There are three steps in the ablation casting process:

1. Mold preparation: A mold is made from sand particles bonded with a water-soluble binder.
2. Filling: The mold is filled with molten metal.
3. Ablation: While the metal is still molten, a spray of water erodes away the mold. The water allows direct contact with the metal, which eliminates the air gap that usually forms in other casting processes.

== Advantages ==
Ablation casting has several advantages, including:

- No fumes or dust The mold is washed away without producing fumes or dust.
- High cooling rates The water spray produces high cooling rates, which results in a fine eutectic microstructure.
- Directional solidification The water spray allows for directional solidification, which can help reduce problems with casting alloys.
- Low porosity The high temperature gradient and solidification speeds can help eliminate shrinkage porosity.

== Examples ==
Honda used ablation casting to produce the Acura NSX hybrid supercar. Honda chose ablation casting because conventional castings would have been too brittle for the car's crush zones.
