= Honda NSX (second generation) =

Honda NSX (NC1)
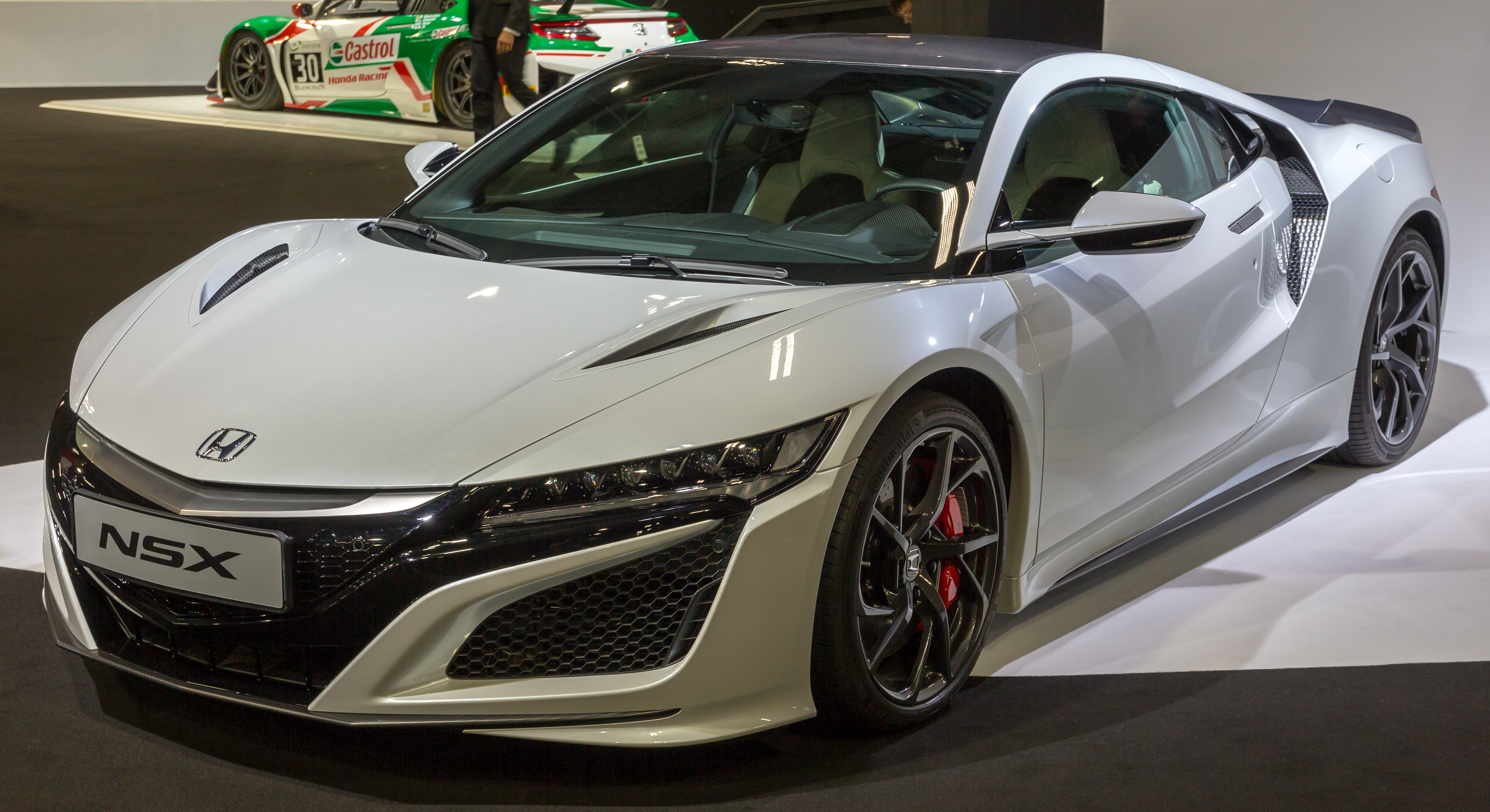

Overview
- Manufacturer: Honda
- Also called: Acura NSX (North America, China and Kuwait)
- Production: May 2016 – 2021 (regular models); 2022 (Type S models); 2026 (Tribute by Italdesign)
- Model years: 2017–2022; 2022 (Type S)
- Assembly: United States: Marysville, Ohio (Performance Manufacturing Center)
- Designer: Jun Goto and Toshinobu Minami; Michelle Christensen (production version); Dai Hara (Type S exterior)

Body and chassis
- Class: Sports car (S)
- Body style: 2-door coupé
- Layout: Longitudinal mid-engine, all-wheel drive

Powertrain
- Engine: 3,493 cc JNC1 twin-turbo V6 75°
- Electric motor: Dual front Twin-motor Unit (TMU) electric motors, single rear Direct Drive electric motor
- Power output: 427 kW (573 hp; 581 PS); 449 kW (602 hp; 610 PS) (Type S)
- Transmission: 9-speed dual-clutch
- Hybrid drivetrain: Full hybrid
- Battery: Lithium-ion

Dimensions
- Wheelbase: 2,630 mm (103.5 in)
- Length: 4,470 mm (176.0 in) (2016–2018); 4,490 mm (176.8 in) (2019–2021); 4,535 mm (178.5 in) (Type S)
- Width: 1,938 mm (76.3 in)
- Height: 1,215 mm (47.8 in)
- Curb weight: 1,725–1,796 kg (3,803–3,960 lb)

Chronology
- Predecessor: Honda NSX (first generation)

The second-generation Honda NSX (marketed as the Acura NSX in North America, China and Kuwait) (Note: New Sports eXperience; model code NC1) is a two-seater sports car which was developed and manufactured by Honda. It is a two-door coupe with a rear mid-engine, all-wheel-drive layout and a gasoline-electric hybrid drivetrain. The car was developed in collaboration between the company's divisions in Japan and the United States, and all models were hand-built at a dedicated factory in Ohio. Production began in 2016 and ended in 2022 with the Type S variant. It succeeds the first-generation NSX that was produced in Japan from 1990 to 2005. The development team aimed to make the car suit a wide range of driving conditions, from high-performance driving on winding roads and racetracks to more relaxed street driving.

The car is powered by a bespoke 3.5-liter twin-turbocharged V6 engine producing 373 kW (507 PS; 500 hp), supplemented by three electric motors to bring the total power output to 427 kW (581 PS; 573 hp). Two of these electric motors are mounted on the front wheels and the remaining one powers the rear wheels, allowing torque vectoring for improved cornering performance, torque fill for improved acceleration, and instant torque for improved response. The NC1 NSX was among the first sports cars and the first car in its performance segment to use hybrid technology. The car received an updated version in 2019, with minor changes to the chassis and styling. For its final model year in 2022, a limited-production Type S model was introduced, with an increase in power to 449 kW (610 PS; 602 hp), various tweaks to the chassis and transmission, and aerodynamic and styling upgrades. A total of 2,908 cars were produced, including 350 Type S models.

The second-generation NSX has been used in motorsports, with a GT500 class Super GT model competing between 2014 and 2023 and a production-based GT3 racing version debuting in 2017. It also won multiple awards, including 2017 Performance Car of the Year by Road & Track magazine.

== Development ==
=== 2008 and prior ===
In July 2005, Honda's North American luxury brand Acura announced that a successor to the first-generation NSX was in development, with the original being discontinued at the end of the year. Over two years later in December 2007, Honda America's CEO, Tetsuo Iwamura, confirmed to the automotive press that the new sports car would be powered by a V10 engine and make its debut to the market by 2010. Potential styling of the car was previewed by the Acura ASCC (Advanced Sports Car Concept) introduced at the 2007 North American International Auto Show. Prototypes of the vehicle were seen testing on the Nürburgring in June 2008, with Honda's CEO Takeo Fukui challenging the developers to make the car faster than the Nissan GT-R around the track. On December 17, 2008, Fukui announced during a speech about Honda's revised financial forecasts that, due to poor economic conditions, all plans for a next-generation of the NSX had been cancelled; the company's profits fell by 81% due to the 2008 financial crisis.

Although the road car project was cancelled, the company used the vehicle as a base model for a racing car named Honda HSV-010 GT, which they entered in the Japanese Super GT Series from 2010 to 2013. Honda was able to enter the HSV-010 GT on the basis that the base model was "production-ready", even though most cars in the series had to be based on production cars. As mandated by the class regulations, that car had a front-engined, rear-wheel drive layout, powered by a 3.4-liter V8, rated over 500 hp (373 kW).

=== 2011 onwards ===
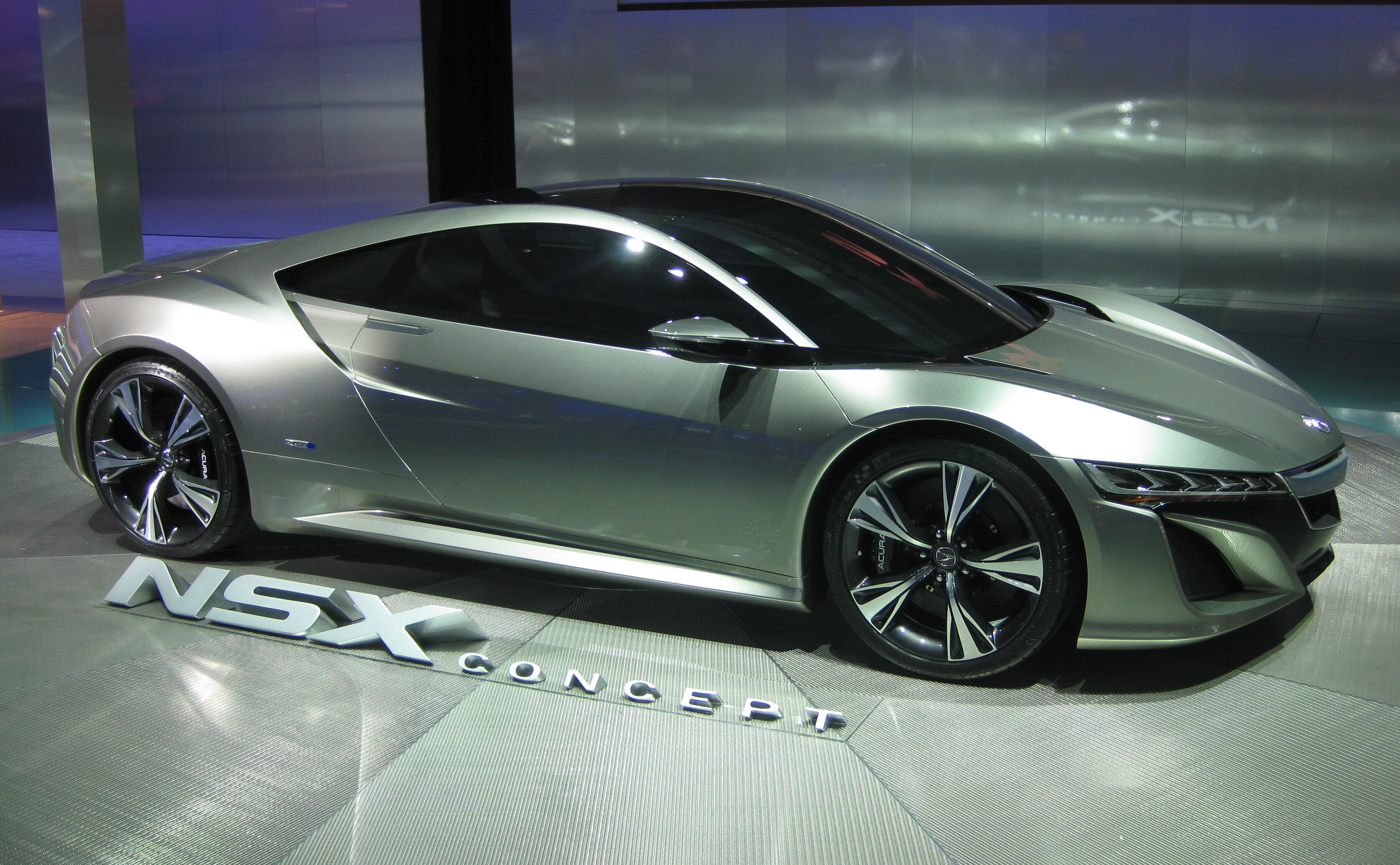
Acura NSX Concept at the 2012 North American International Auto Show

In late 2010 and early 2011, reports from various automotive magazines began to emerge that Honda was again planning to make a new sports car to be a successor to the original NSX, and that it could use electric motors in addition to a petrol engine. Honda CEO Takanobu Ito confirmed in September 2011 that the company had begun development of a new sports car, and by the end of the year in December, Acura announced that they would unveil the next generation of the NSX in concept form at the 2012 North American International Auto Show. On January 9, 2012, Acura unveiled the mid-engined 2012 NSX Concept to the general public, confirming that its SH-AWD system incorporates two electric motors on the front wheels and one on the rear wheels to augment the combustion engine, thus forming a hybrid setup. This setup was chosen to take advantage of the torque vectoring capabilities, instant torque, added power and improved efficiency the electric motors would bring. The concept of a hybrid sports car was new at the time, with other such cars like the Porsche 918, LaFerrari, McLaren P1 and BMW i8 still yet to be released. At the following year's show, a more refined 2013 NSX Concept was revealed with styling closer to the production car.

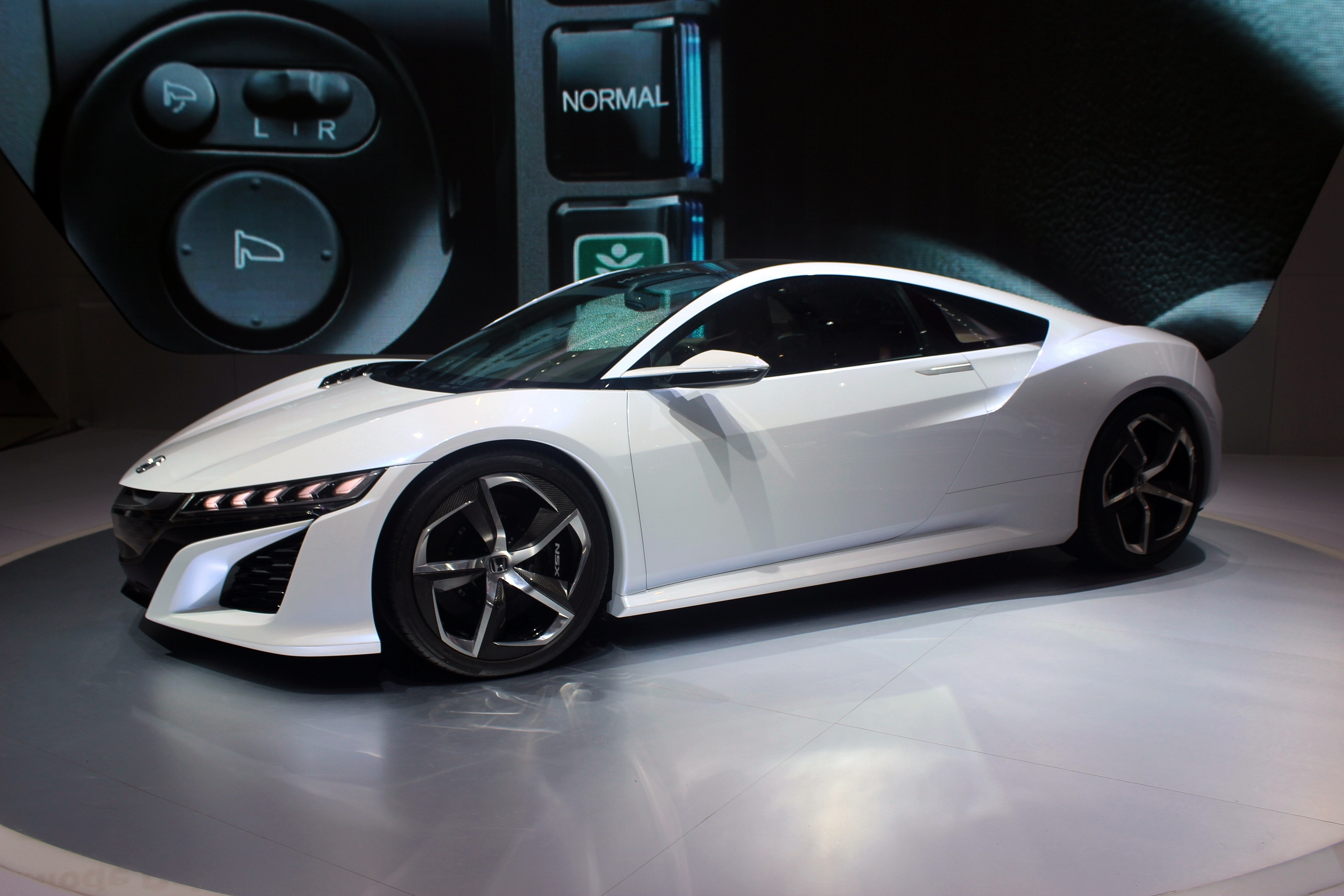
Honda NSX Concept at the 2014 Indonesia International Motor Show

The new NSX would be developed in collaboration between Honda's divisions in Japan and the United States. Initial planning was done in Japan, before a joint Japanese-American development team was established. Development of the engine, hybrid system and transmission would be done at Honda's Automobile R&D Center facility in Tochigi, Japan, while development of the rest of the vehicle was concentrated at the Honda R&D Americas development center in Ohio, United States. Ted Klaus, a Honda engineer since 1990 and future president of Honda Performance Development, was chosen as the global large project leader of the project, while Ryoji Tsukamoto was the large project leader in Japan. Many of the engineers who worked on the car had previously worked on Honda's various motorsport programs.

Early on, the car's core development team met the creators of the original NSX to understand the philosophy behind it on a deeper level. The first-generation model's development team also shared memories, diagrams and schematics from its development, helping the new team establish their vision of what the new car should be like: not a newer version of the original model, but rather a completely new car that maintained the core values of the original. The original NSX's development leaders had encouraged the new team to not directly copy what they did, and the large project leader of the original NSX, Shigeru Uehara, himself had expressed that everything they wanted to do with the first-generation NSX was ultimately accomplished, and as such he wished that the new NSX's development team be given full freedom to design a new car. In terms of the core NSX values, the team felt the car should have performance that would be accessible to less experienced drivers, yet the car should "come alive" with a skillful driver behind the wheel. Everyday usability as well as strong visibility and ergonomics were also deemed as essential values of the NSX. Although the car would use various technologies, the team still wanted it to retain a "real analogue 'sports car' feeling". The team also opted to focus more on the driving feel of the car rather than purely trying to obtain certain performance figures, with Klaus stating: "The NSX has never been about a set of figures on a piece of paper. As with the original, the eventual power figure won't grab headlines, for instance, but the qualities that you can't write down, such as driver involvement and pleasure, are the ones that will matter."

The car was initially set to have a transversely-mounted, naturally-aspirated, 60-degree 3471 cc SOHC V6 engine taken from the Acura RLX/Honda Legend, but in 2013 or earlier, the team came to the conclusion that this engine was not powerful enough to meet the car's performance targets. The team therefore commissioned Honda's R&D Center in Tochigi, Japan to develop a brand-new engine specifically for the NSX with significantly higher performance. A twin-turbocharged, 75-degree 3493 cc DOHC V6 with dry-sump lubrication was chosen, and unlike the previous engine, it would be mounted longitudinally. This change of engine orientation and the space required by the turbochargers and added cooling meant that the rear of the car had to redesigned mid-way through development to accommodate these changes.

The development team tested, benchmarked and examined various cars from rival manufacturers, including the Ferrari 458 Italia, Audi R8 V10, Porsche 911 Turbo, Nissan GT-R and McLaren 12C. The NSX was extensively tested on various racetracks and test facilities, with primary venues including Honda's Takasu test track and Suzuka Circuit in Japan, the Nürburgring Nordschleife in Germany, and the Virginia International Raceway and Transportation Research Center in the United States. Numerous road tests were also conducted, including on the mountain passes in the European Alps. During these sessions, the team was able to fine-tune the car and its systems, with some changes being able to be made on the spot, and others, such as software modifications, through conference calls to Japan. To ensure the car would be reliable in hot weather, the team carried out tests in hot conditions at racecourses like Sebring, as well as long road tests in the UAE. A number of Honda-affiliated racing drivers contributed to the car's development and gave feedback, including Indianapolis 500 winners Dario Franchitti and Takuma Sato and 24 Hours of Daytona winner Graham Rahal.

After the production version was launched, development of future variants of the NSX was moved fully to Japan and Satoshi Mizukami assumed the role of large project leader.

== Official launch and production ==
=== Debut ===
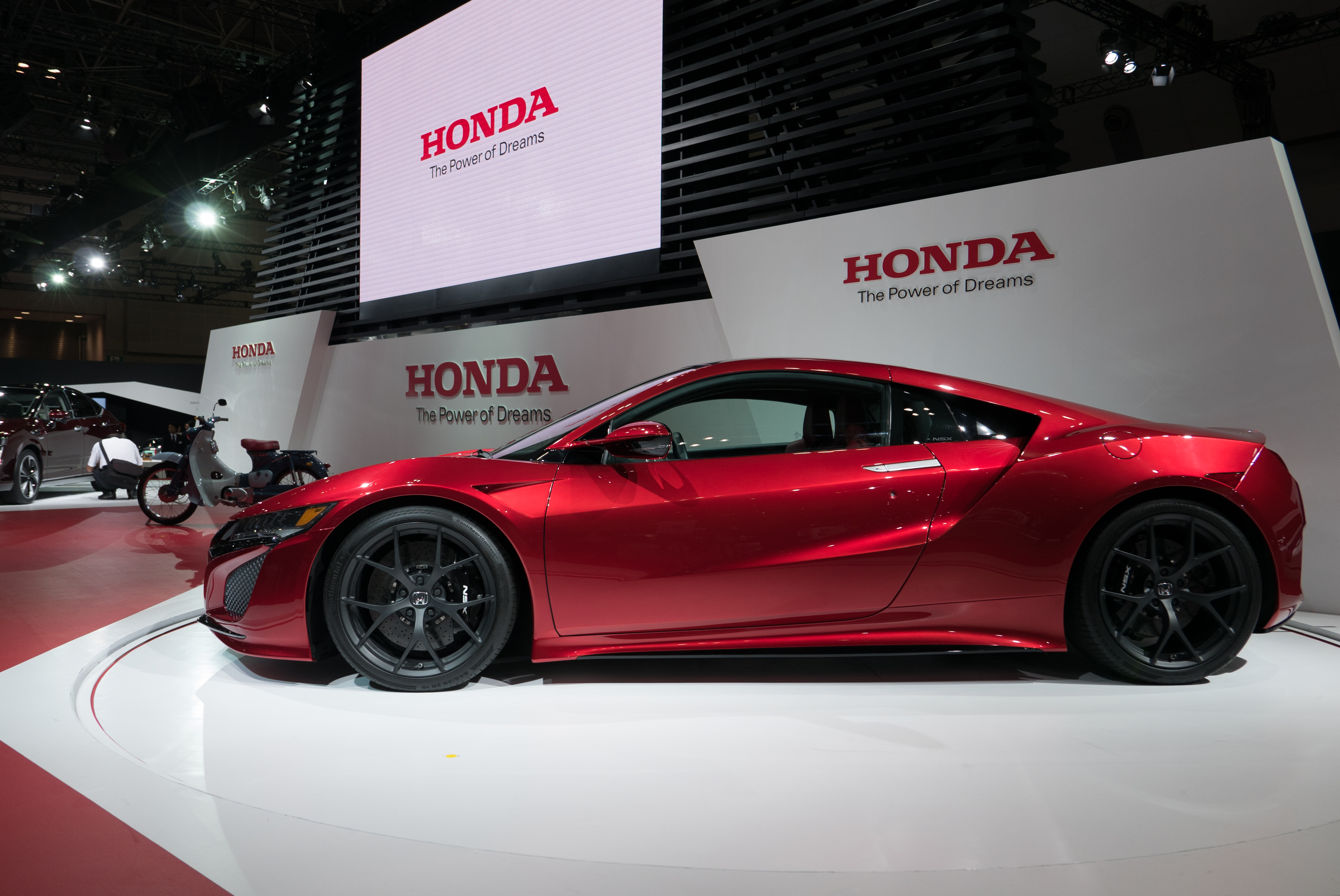
Honda NSX at the 2015 Tokyo Motor Show

On December 27, 2014, Honda announced that the second-generation of the NSX flagship sports car would debut at the 2015 North American International Auto Show, where the car was revealed on January 12, 2015. Honda began taking orders for the NSX in summer 2015, and deliveries in late 2015. In December 2015, the North American pricing was announced with a starting price of US$156,000.

At the same time, Honda announced the European debut for the NSX at the 85th Geneva Motor Show, alongside the FK2 Civic Type R.

The first production vehicle with VIN #001 was auctioned off by Barrett Jackson on January 29, 2016. NASCAR team owner Rick Hendrick won the auction with a bid for US$1.2 million. The entire proceeds from the auction were donated to the charities Pediatric Brain Tumor Foundation and Camp Southern Ground. The first NSX rolled off the production line in Ohio on May 24, 2016.

=== Production ===
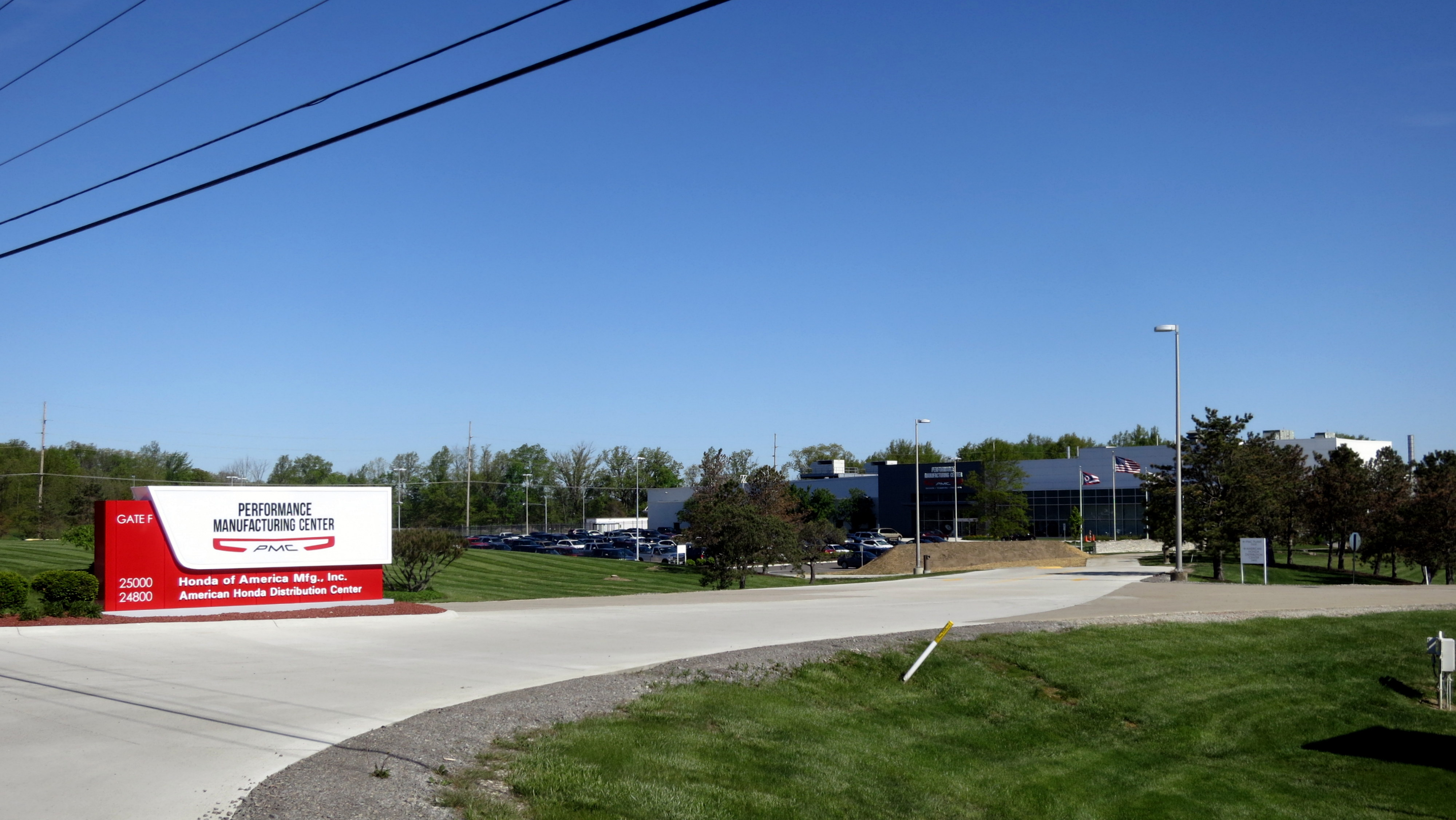
Performance Manufacturing Center (PMC) at Marysville, Ohio

Production of the second generation NSX commenced in 2015 at Honda's Performance Manufacturing Center (PMC), a new US $70 million plant in Marysville, Ohio, built specifically for assembly of the NSX. It is housed inside Honda's former North American Logistics facility, in the midst of their existing research and development (R&D) and production engineering operations. The powertrain is separately assembled by Honda associates at its engine plant in Anna, Ohio.

In February 2017, Honda offered a factory tour, exclusively for the 2017 through 2022 model years U.S. market NSX buyers, called the "NSX Insider Experience". The tour featured the NSX assembly at the PMC facility, a museum visit at the Honda Heritage Center, and racetrack driving at Honda's test track there. Also, owners of the non-delivered NSX could track their personal NSX being assembled and tested, and could place the Acura badge on the just assembled NSX. This factory tour was offered with packages from US $2,000 through up to $6,000 and each participant was guided by an Acura host in an Acura MDX.

=== Discontinuation ===
In 2020, Honda stopped producing the NSX for Japan, Australia and Europe including the United Kingdom due to its poor sales, and announced that it is no longer available in the respective areas for sale. In 2019 and 2020, the NSX had sold only 3 units, and none in Australia. Also, in Japan, only 9 units were sold in January 2020. At the end of 2021, Honda stopped producing the NSX for all other markets and stated that only a limited run Type S variant will be produced in 2022. Honda has sold 2,908 units worldwide (including Type S models).

=== Dimensions ===
The table below indicates the change in dimensions, relative to the original second generation concept car presented in 2012:

	Second-gen NSX	2012 NSX Concept	Difference	2005 NSX	Difference
Length	4,470 mm (176 in)	4,390 mm (173 in)	+80 mm (3.1 in)	4,425 mm (174.2 in)	+45 mm (1.8 in)
Width	1,940 mm (76 in)	1,915 mm (75.4 in)	+25 mm (0.98 in)	1,810 mm (71 in)	+130 mm (5.1 in)
Height	1,215 mm (47.8 in)	1,200 mm (47 in)	+15 mm (0.59 in)	1,170 mm (46 in)	+45 mm (1.8 in)
Wheelbase	2,630 mm (104 in)	2,610 mm (103 in)	+20 mm (0.79 in)	2,530 mm (100 in)	+100 mm (3.9 in)
Front track	1,655 mm (65.2 in)	–	–	1,510 mm (59 in)	+145 mm (5.7 in)
Rear track	1,615 mm (63.6 in)	–	–	1,540 mm (61 in)	+75 mm (3.0 in)

== Overview ==
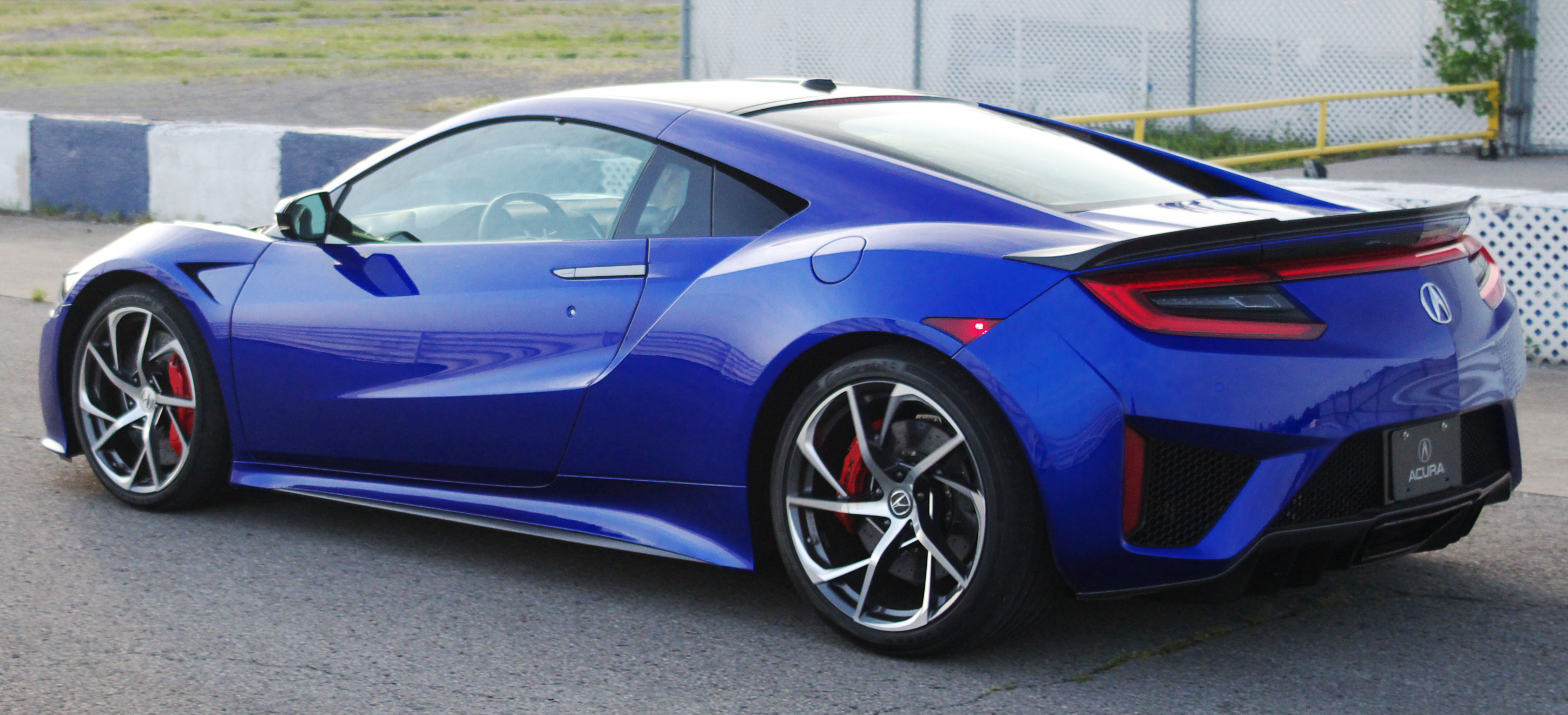
Rear view

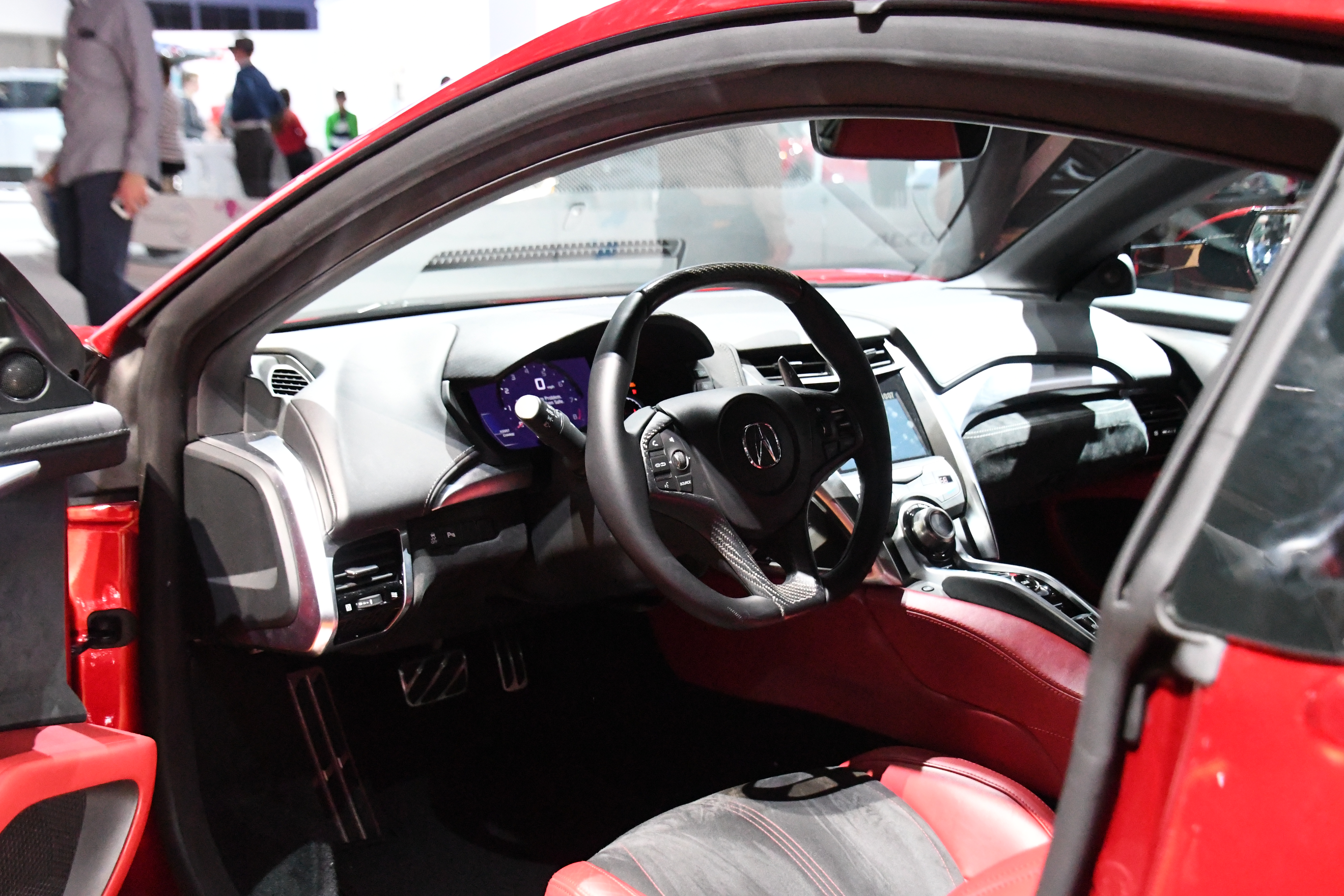
Interior

=== Engine and powertrain ===
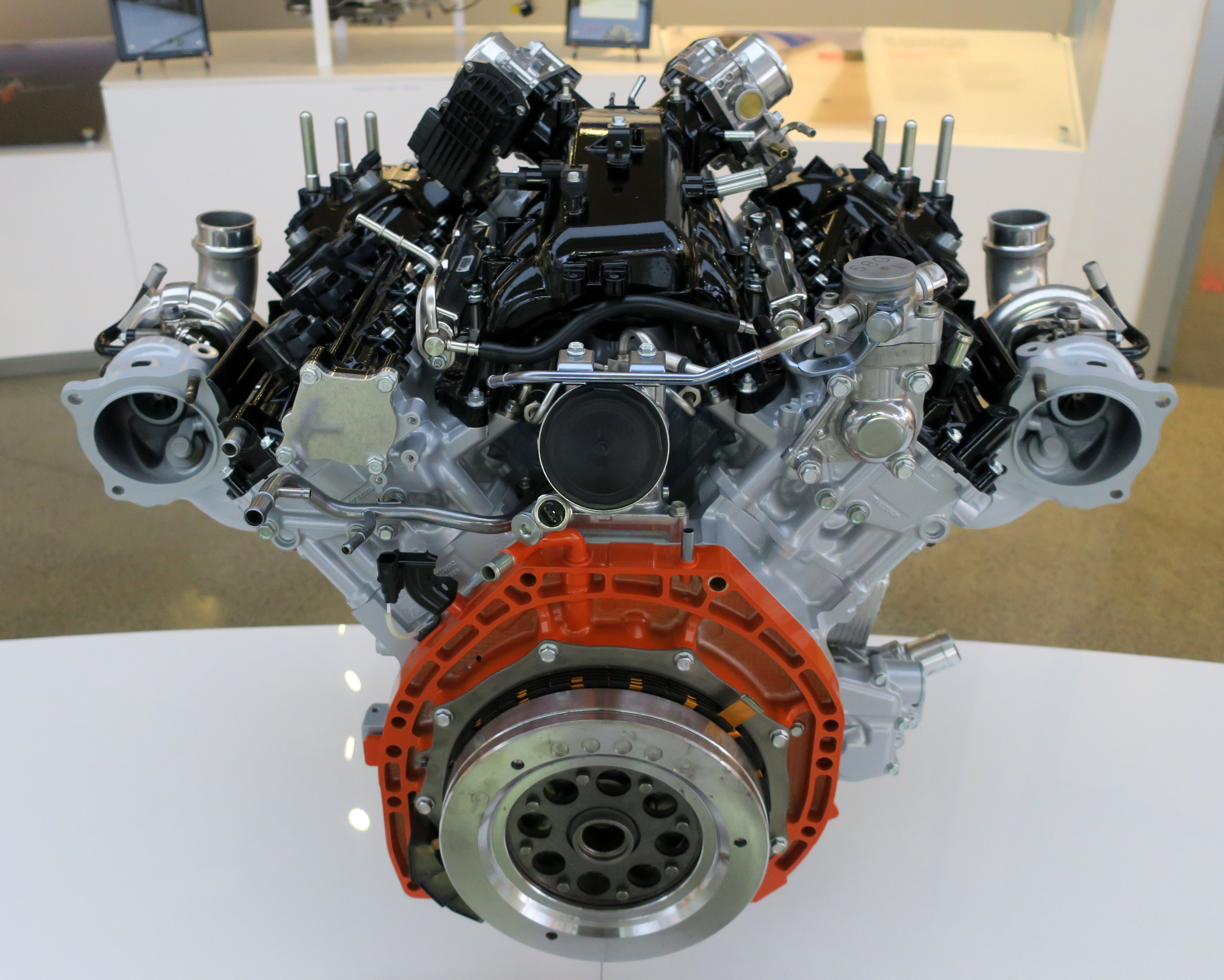
The NSX's 3.5-liter JNC1 V6 engine features a unique 75-degree V-angle.

The car is powered by an internal combustion engine and three electric motors, which combined deliver a maximum power output of 573 hp (581 PS; 427 kW) and peak torque of 476 lb⋅ft (645 N⋅m). The engine, designated JNC1, is a clean sheet design made exclusively for the NSX. It is a twin-turbocharged, 75-degree 3,493 cc (3.5 L; 213.2 cu in) DOHC V6 unit, the bore and stroke of 91 mm x 89.5 mm, with a maximum power output of 500 hp (507 PS; 373 kW) delivered at 6,500–7,500 rpm. It has a broad torque curve, with its maximum torque output of 406 lb⋅ft (550 N⋅m) arriving at 2,000–6,000 rpm, and it redlines at 7,500 rpm. The engine is mounted longitudinally in a mid-rear layout and solely powers the rear wheels. It is a compact design mounted low in the chassis, with the top of the engine being located no higher than the top of the car's tires. The 75-degree V-angle of the engine is uncommon, as most V6 engines have either a 60- or 90-degree bank angle. This angle was chosen to have the best balance between a low center of gravity and minimum vibrations, with the lower and wider 90-degree V6s having inherent vibration issues and the 60-degree angle making the engine undesirably tall. The implementation of a dry sump lubrication system further lowers the center of gravity, reduces the space required for the engine, and prevents engine oil starvation during high-speed cornering. Fuel is injected to the combustion chambers via a DI+PI system; this combines direct injection with port injection, with the latter being used to improve performance at higher engine speeds. High-tumble intake ports are also used, which, in combination with direct injection, enable quick and stable combustion. Hydraulic valve timing control (Dual-VTC) is used in both the intake and exhaust valvetrain systems, which also feature swing-arm type valve actuators. The turbochargers, positioned on both sides of the engine, are a single-scroll design and use electronic wastegates, providing a peak boost pressure of 15.23 psi (1.05 bar). To provide wear resistance, a plasma-transferred thermal spray was applied to the cylinder walls, improving heat transfer and reducing weight compared to more typical cast iron cylinder liners. The NSX's engine is also used in the GT3 race version in "virtually 'bone-stock' form" unlike in other GT3 cars, according to Honda.

The three electric motors were implemented to take advantage of the torque vectoring capabilities, instant torque, added power and improved efficiency they bring. Two of these electric motors are mounted on the front wheels and the remaining one drives the rear wheels, with each of the two front motors providing 36 hp (36 PS; 27 kW) and 54 lb⋅ft (73 N⋅m) of torque, while the rear motor produces 47 hp (48 PS; 35 kW) and 109 lb⋅ft (148 N⋅m) of torque. Since the engine and the electric motors produce their peak power at different speeds, the total system peak output is 573 hp (581 PS; 427 kW) instead of 619 hp (628 PS; 462 kW). In addition to the added power and torque, the electric motors can deliver their peak torque instantaneously, meaning they can further improve the car's acceleration and throttle response. As the front electric motors are able to instantly send positive or negative torque to the front wheels (the latter through regenerative braking), they can create a yaw moment during cornering by sending more torque to the outside wheel, which in turn can improve cornering speeds and create a more agile feel to the car. This AWD system, named Sport Hybrid SH-AWD, can produce a yaw effect in situations where typical mechanical ones cannot, such as when little or no throttle is applied, because the electric motors operate independently from the internal combustion engine. The motors can also provide torque fill during gear changes and lower engine speeds, resulting in more constant and linear acceleration. A 1.3 kWh lithium-ion battery is placed low in the chassis to lower the center of gravity.

The gearbox, designed and built in-house by Honda, is a longitudinal nine-speed dual-clutch transmission (DCT) that can be operated with paddle-shifters behind the steering wheel. It was the world's first nine-speed DCT to be fitted in a production car. The first gear is intended to be a launch gear and the ninth gear is configured for highway cruising, with the seven gears between them (2nd–8th) being designed to make optimum use of the car's power band. Eighth is the ideal gear for achieving the car's top speed, while ninth gear drops the engine speed to around 1,700 rpm when cruising at 60 mph (97 km/h). The length of the gearbox was reduced by 4.72 in (120 mm) by eliminating the first-gear shift mechanism and sharing transmission gears, which Honda says contributes to a rear overhang that is 1.38 in (35 mm) shorter than in comparable cars with seven-speed DCTs. A limited slip differential is integrated into the transmission.

=== Chassis ===
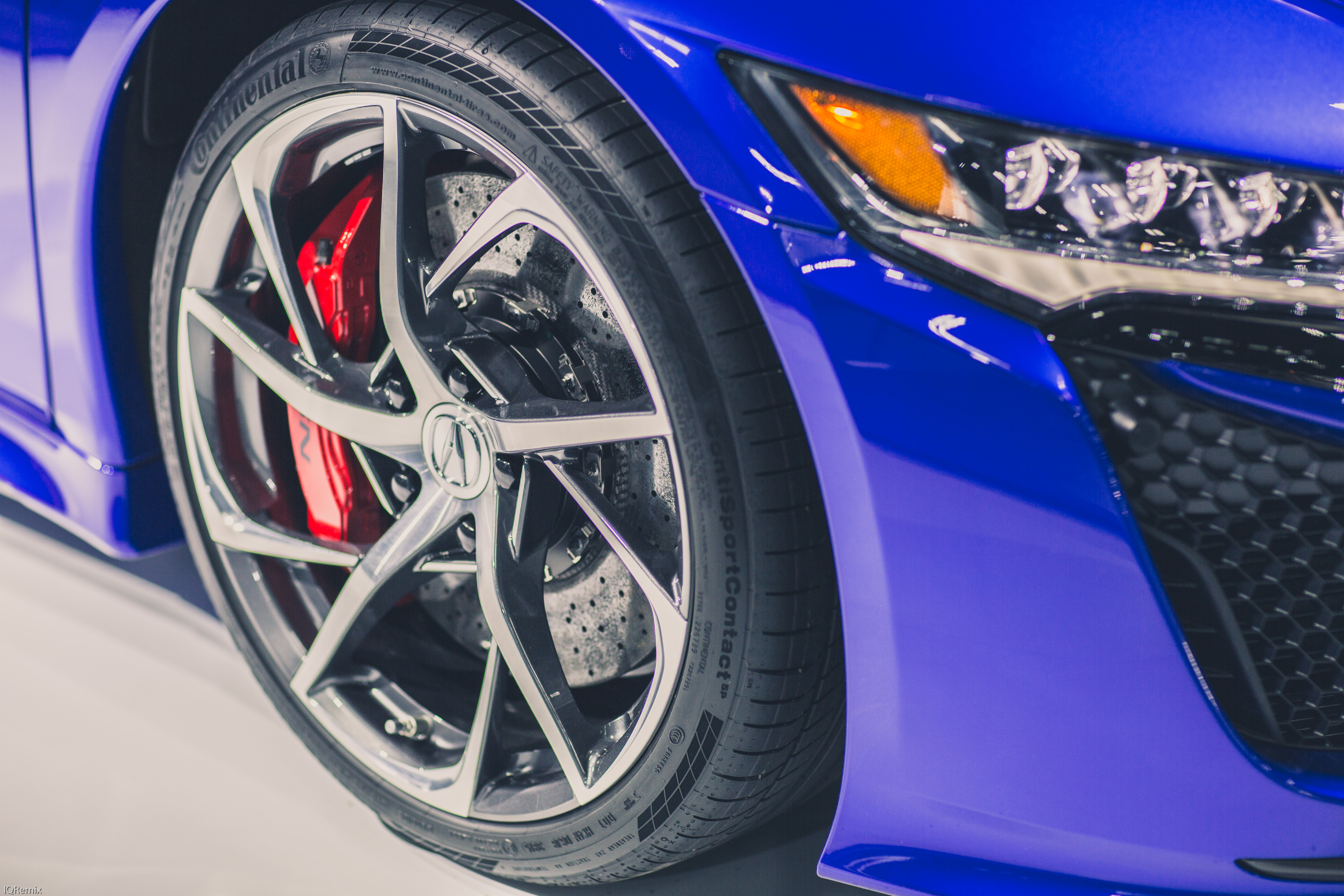
NSX aluminum wheels, optional carbon-ceramic brakes and Continental tires

The NSX has a multi-material space frame made primarily of aluminum, while its exterior body panels are mostly made from sheet molding composite and aluminum. Cast aluminum nodes are used as mounting points for the suspension and engine, and in a world's first car application, the nodes in crush zones are formed using ablation casting technology. The A-pillars are made of steel, with their upper portion and roof rails formed of three-dimensionally bent and quenched ultra-high-strength steel tubes – another first-ever application in an automobile. This allows the pillars to be thinner for better visibility while maintaining strong structural rigidity. The floor panels are made from carbon fiber, with a carbon fiber roof available as an option. According to manufacturer data, the NSX has the lowest center of gravity among its competitors and is also the most rigid car in its class. Its space frame has three times the dynamic torsional stiffness and twice the static torsional stiffness of the Ferrari 458 Italia.

The suspension is double-wishbone with dual lower pivots at the front and multi-link at the rear. All four corners have magnetorheological (MR) dampers. The MR dampers can continuously adjust damping forces in fractions of a second to better suit the driving conditions. A dual-pinion electric power steering system was adopted with a variable gear ratio ranging from 12.9:1 on center to 11.07:1, progressively becoming quicker when off center. The vehicle's brakes feature six-piston front and four-piston rear monobloc calipers made by Brembo, with 370 mm front and 360 mm rear iron discs available as standard and 380 mm front and 360 mm rear carbon ceramic discs available as an option. The brakes are operated by a brake-by-wire system which simulates pedal feel based on factors such as the rate of deceleration, while the front electric motors can also provide braking force through regenerative braking. 19-inch front and 20-inch rear forged aluminum alloy wheels are fitted with either Continental ContiSport Contact 5 or optional track-oriented Pirelli P-Zero Trofeo R tires, which both have a width of 245 mm at the front and 305 mm at the rear.

As the car has a rear-mid-engine layout that is commonly found in high-end sports cars, more of its mass is on the rear axle than on the front with a 42/58 front-to-rear weight distribution. This can improve turn-in response and cornering speeds at the expense of reduced stability compared to a more front-heavy distribution. The car is equipped with an electronic stability control system called Vehicle Stability Assist (VSA), whose intervention threshold and level depend on the driving mode selected, and which can be turned off entirely in Track mode.

=== Exterior ===
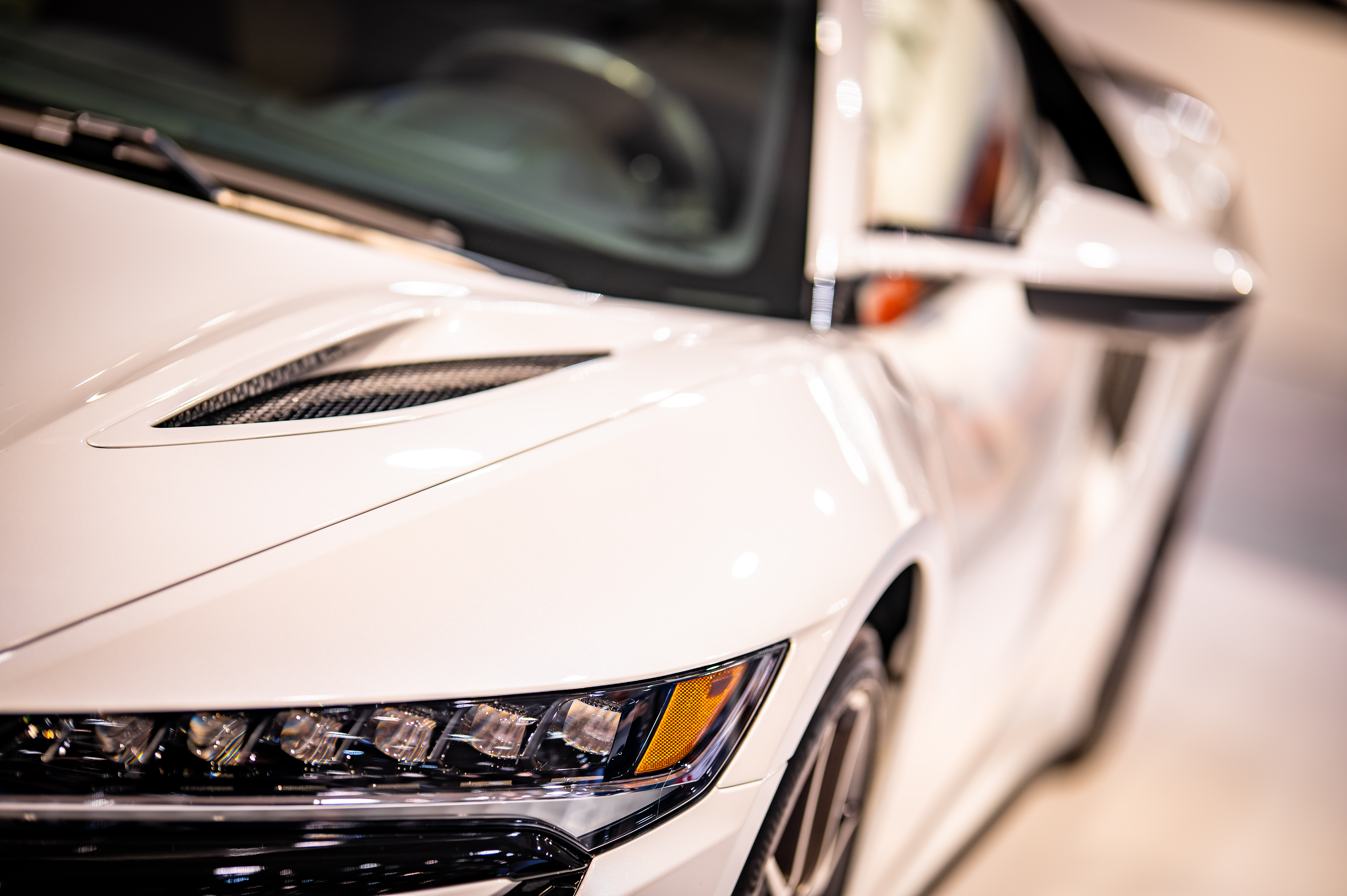
The vents on the NSX's hood create downforce and help direct air along the door panels.

The second-generation NSX has a length of 4470 mm with a wheelbase of 2629 mm, while its height is 1214 mm and width is 2217 mm. The initial design of the car was conceived at Honda's design center in Wako, Japan; this was then evolved into the final production model by the Acura Design Studio in Los Angeles, US. The final production version is 80 mm longer than the 2012 concept and about 20 mm longer in width, height and wheelbase. The design team followed the philosophy of "form follows function" to try to achieve the optimum balance between downforce, cooling, and drag.

The car produces around three times more downforce on the rear axle than on the front to aid stability, and it has a total of ten radiators. Three radiators in the front cool the engine. The front also houses a cooler for the TMU, a cooler for the DCT, a cooler for the PDU, and a condenser. In the engine bay, a small cooler helps the DCT clutch maintain functional temperatures, while each quarter panel houses an intercooler. The front bumper features large vents to get cool air flow into where the car's main radiators are located. This air is then released via vents on the hood, fenders and wheel wakes, which also create downforce on the front axle. These vents are shaped so that they help direct the air along the door panels into a large intake for the engine compartment at the rear, with a floating C-pillar design enabling some of this air to flow to the rear decklid for downforce. The air exits out of the engine room through broad vents on the rear bumper as well as a small horizontal opening above the taillights. An optional carbon fiber rear spoiler further increases the level of rear downforce. Underneath, the car has a flat underbody and a rear diffuser.

Eight different exterior colors were offered on the original pre-update models, three of which were optional pearl and metallic paint schemes, while two were special aerospace-grade "Andaro" colors. Two wheel designs were available: a slightly lighter Y-spoke wheel and a more stylized interwoven design. The latter was offered with a 3D-machined, polished or painted finish. LED headlights, taillights and daytime running lights are used for lighting.

=== Performance ===
External videos
- 2021 Acura NSX at Pikes Peak
- 2016 Honda NSX at Sachsenring
- 2016 Acura NSX drifting at the TRC Dynamic Handling Course

The car has a 0 to 60 mph (97 km/h) acceleration time of 2.9 seconds and an electronically limited top speed of 191 mph (307 km/h). In a test conducted by Car and Driver, the NSX accelerated from 0 to 60 mph (97 km/h) in 3.1 seconds and completed the quarter-mile run in 11.2 seconds at 126 mph (203 km/h).

In September 2021, Acura conducted a test for the NSX Type S around the Grand Prix of Long Beach street circuit with IMSA SportsCar champion Ricky Taylor driving. He set a lap time of 1:32.784 minutes, which was nearly three seconds faster than the 2019 NSX's 1:35.663 minute lap time set by Peter Cunningham and the lap record for a road-legal production vehicles.

== Variants ==
=== 2019 update ===
2019 Honda NSX with the Thermal Orange Pearl body color

In August 2018, Honda announced an overall improvements for the 2019 model year. The improvements included larger front and rear stabilizer bars, which increased front stiffness by 26 percent and rear stiffness by 19 percent, as well as 21 percent stiffer rear toe link bushings. New specially developed Continental tires and optional Pirelli P Zero Trofeo R tires were also included. These led to software optimizations to the Sport Hybrid SH-AWD system, active magnetorheological dampers, electric power steering and VSA settings. According to Honda, the car is 1.9 seconds faster than the NC1 models around the Suzuka Circuit. Visually, the car's previously silver front grille garnish is now painted in the same color as the body. Additionally, a new Thermal Orange Pearl body color became available for 2019, followed by Indy Yellow Pearl for 2020 and Long Beach Blue Pearl for 2021.

=== NSX Type S (2022) ===
On 3 August 2021, Honda announced they would produce an improved, limited-production NSX Type S for 2022 to mark the car's final year of production. The NSX Type S was limited to 350 units worldwide, with 300 of these units available for the U.S. market, 30 for Japan and 15 for Canada. The Type S was the only version of the NSX that will be produced during 2022. The moniker was last used in the NSX on the 1997 NSX Type S and Type S-Zero models that were exclusive for the Japanese domestic market meaning that the 2022 version was the first NSX Type S to be sold out of Japan. The car was unveiled on 12 August 2021 at the Monterey Car Week in the United States, and on 30 August in Japan.

The NSX Type S features several enhancements to the NSX's powertrain, providing a combined maximum power output of 602 hp (610 PS; 449 kW) and 492 lb⋅ft (667 N⋅m) of torque. Enhancements to the internal combustion engine include new turbochargers from the NSX GT3 Evo race car that increase peak boost pressure by 5.6 percent from 15.2 psi (1.05 bar) to 16.1 psi (1.11 bar), new fuel injectors which increase flow rate by 25 percent, and new intercoolers that can dissipate an additional 15 percent more heat than previously. As a result of these upgrades, the internal combustion engine now generates a maximum power output of 522 hp (529 PS; 389 kW) at 6,500–6,850 rpm and 443 lb⋅ft (601 N⋅m) of torque at 2,300–6,000 rpm. The gear ratio of the Twin Motor Unit powering the front wheels was lowered by 20 percent to improve torque off the line and give the car a quicker launch, while the car's usable battery capacity and battery output have been increased by 20 and 10 percent, respectively, as a result of more efficient usage of the car's Intelligent Power Unit. Because of the improvements in battery capacity and output, the car's electric motors have been retuned to offer better performance and a higher electric-only range. The car's 9-speed dual-clutch transmission (DCT) also features improvements. New programming for Sport and Sport+ modes resulted in 50 percent faster upshifts, while the allowable downshift speed in Track mode was raised by 1,500 rpm to allow earlier downshifts. A new "Rapid Downshift Mode" was introduced, allowing the driver to shift to the lowest possible gear according to the car's speed by holding the downshift paddle for 0.6 seconds in Sport, Sport+ and Track modes. In fully automatic mode, the transmission downshifts earlier in Sport+ and Track modes.

The Type S features several new design elements to improve downforce and cooling through enhanced aerodynamics. These include a new nose design and a large carbon-fiber rear diffuser based on the one used on the NSX GT3 Evo. The car also has new forged split-5 spoke wheels, increasing front track by 0.4 in (10 mm) and rear track by 0.8 in (20 mm), and new semi-slick Pirelli P-Zero tires developed exclusively for the NSX Type S, which have contributed to the car's lateral grip increasing by six percent. Honda also optimized the car's chassis, suspension and response, re-tuned its four drive modes, and refined its engine note. Also, black Honda and Acura badging offered exclusively for the NSX Type S just like other Type S models. As an optional feature, a "Lightweight Package" was introduced, reducing 26 kg (57 lb) from the car's curb weight with carbon ceramic brakes, carbon fiber engine cover and carbon fiber interior parts. Also, a new exclusive body paint color, named "Gotham Gray Matte" on North American models and "Carbon Matte Gray Metallic" on Japanese models, was offered, which is limited for 70 vehicles.

With all of these upgrades, Honda states that the NSX Type S can accelerate from 0 to 60 mph (0 to 97 km/h) in under 3 seconds, electronically limited top speed remains at 307 km/h (191 mph) and two seconds faster at the Suzuka Circuit than the 2019–2021 NSX, meaning that the Type S is four seconds faster than the original 2016–2018 model at Suzuka. In May 2022, Car and Driver conducted a performance test for the NSX Type S; the car was 0.2 seconds quicker than the standard NSX, as it accelerated from 0 to 60 mph (0 to 97 km/h) in 2.9 seconds, and completed the quarter-mile run in 11.0 seconds at 126 mph (203 km/h).

On 14 August 2021, the first NSX Type S – VIN #001 out of 350 – was auctioned to Rick Hendrick (same buyer of the first production NSX, which was auctioned back in 2016) for US$1.1 million at Mecum's Daytime Auction, which was held during the Monterey Car Week. All proceeds were donated to charitable organizations, including the Center of Science and Industry (COSI). All 300 Type S models in the United States were reserved with deposits within 24 hours of the car's launch, with a waiting list that includes more than 100 people. Applications for purchase in Japan began on 2 September 2021, with Japanese deliveries beginning in July 2022. Production of the NSX Type S began in January 2022. North American deliveries began in February 2022. Also, Acura Canada and Make-A-Wish Foundation held an online private auction for the first Type S out of 15 reserved Canadian Type S vehicles. The car led to a bid of US$306,364.90, won by Luc Giard and Geneviève Hardy. This was the largest, one-time, single donation the Make-A-Wish ever received. All of the proceeds were led to help children with critical illnesses.

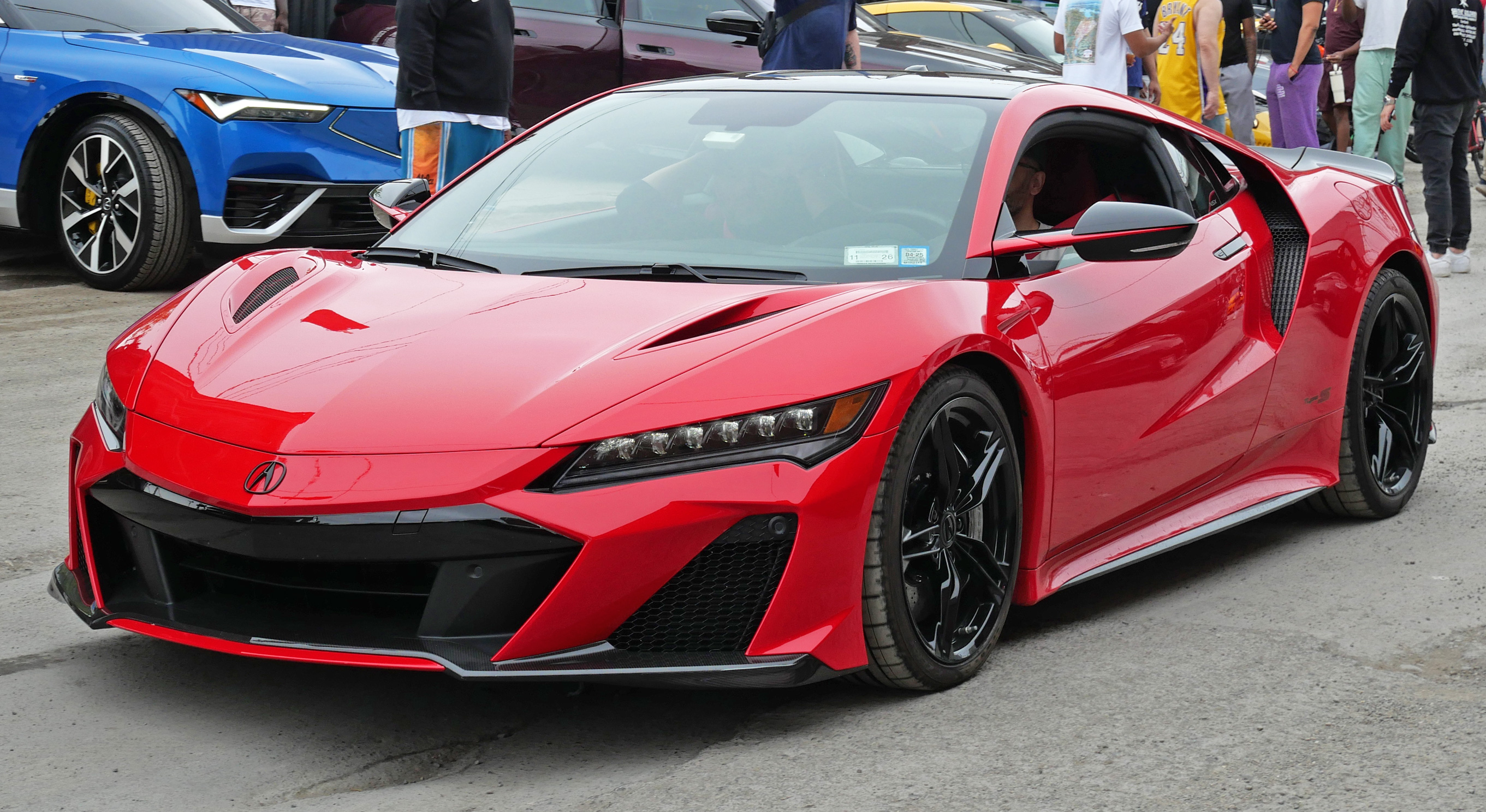
Acura NSX Type S with the Curva Red body color

=== NSX Tribute by Italdesign (2026) ===
Italdesign worked with Honda to create a redesigned version of the second-generation NSX as a tribute to the original NSX. Italdesign said they would only be converting existing customer cars, rather than producing the model themselves, and the conversion was reportedly limited to right-hand-drive examples of the NSX. The NSX by Italdesign made its first exhibition debut at the 2026 Tokyo Auto Salon. There are several inspirations from the first generation model, including the air intake on the roof from the NSX Type R, the distinctive shape of the rear spoiler, and the square-shaped taillight. Production is planned between 10 and 15 units. The tribute doesn't feature any changes to the drivetrain or chassis.

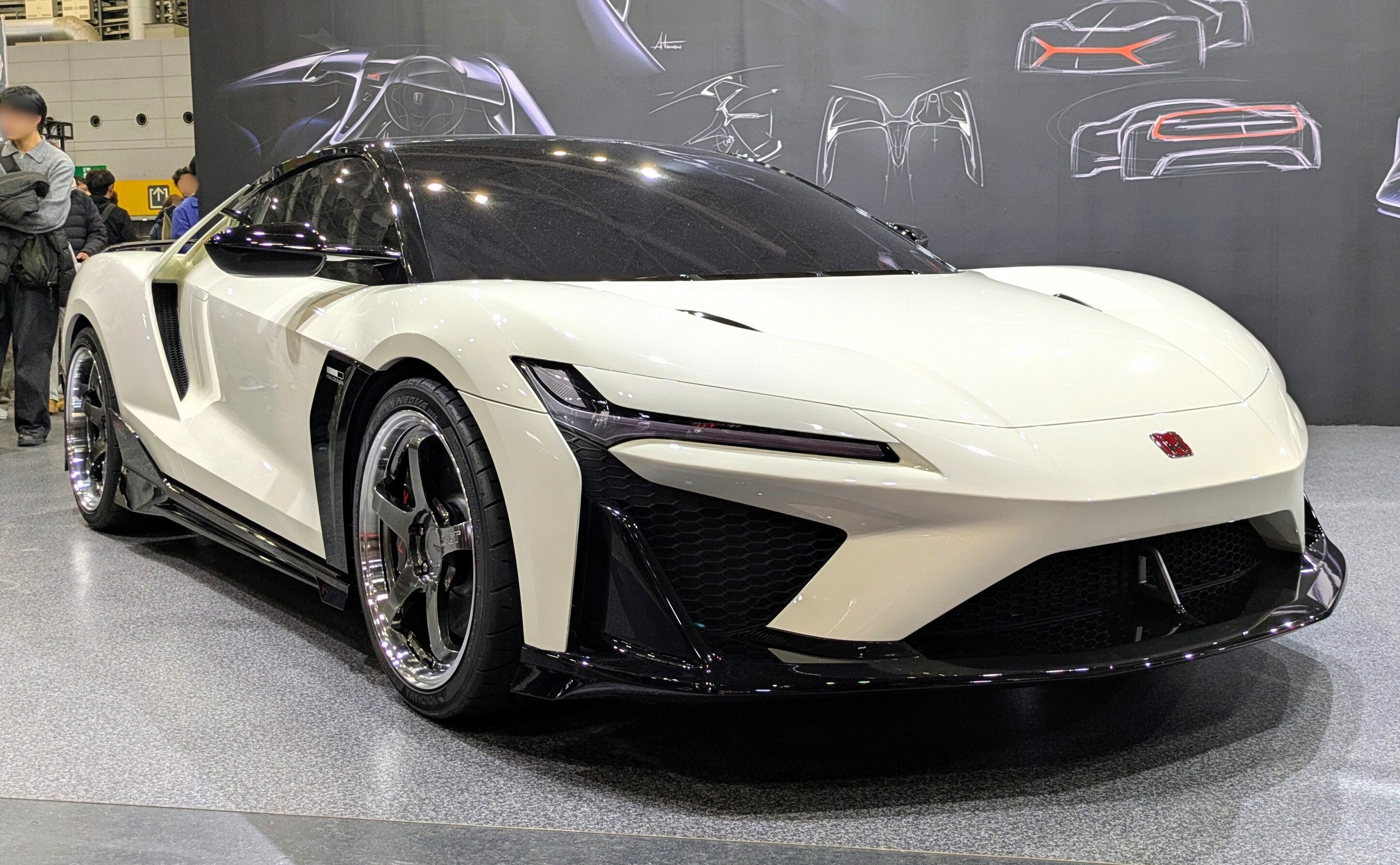
Front

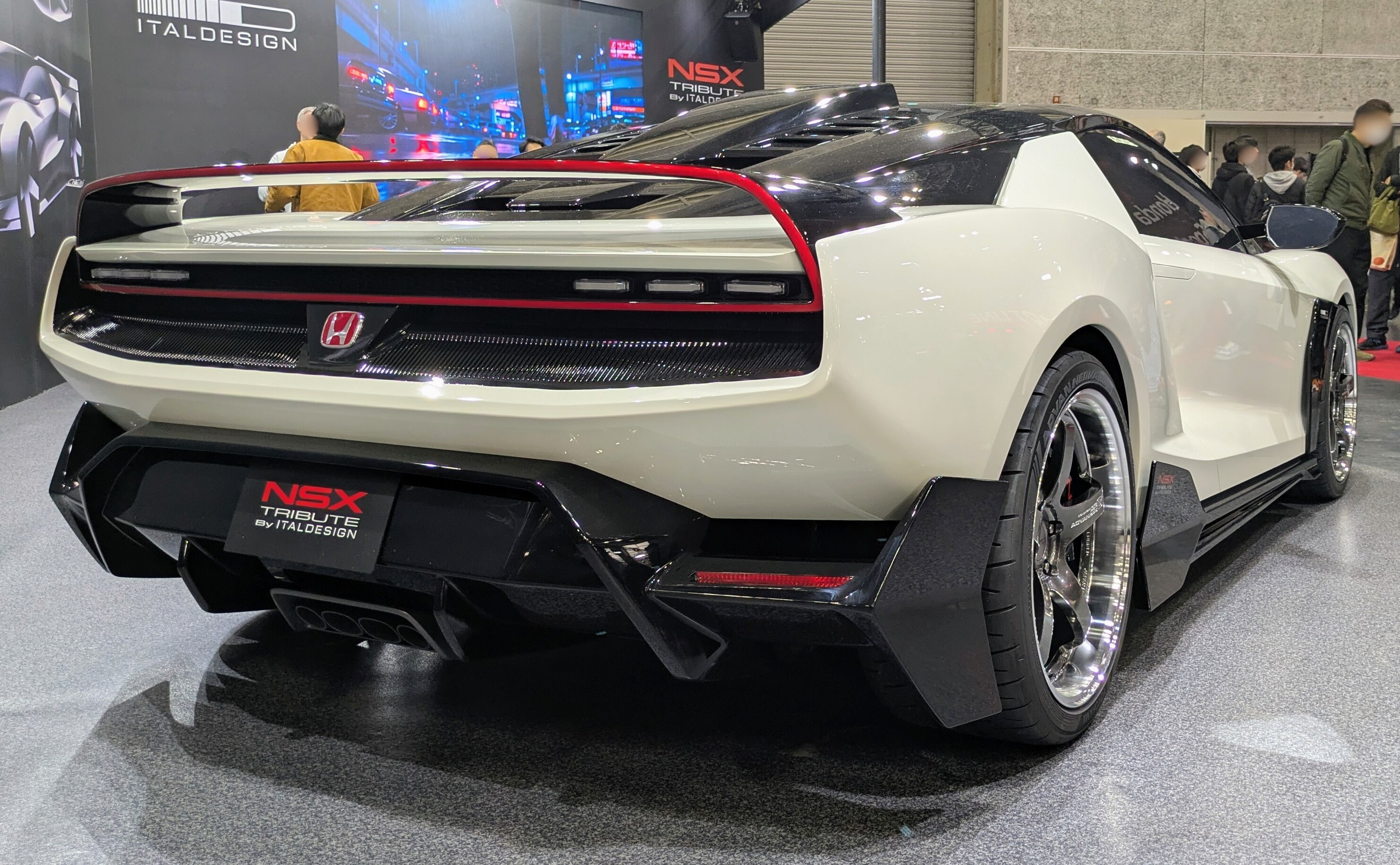
Rear

== Awards and recognition ==
Year	Award and Title
2015	Popular Science – Best of What's New
2016	Auto Bild – Sports Car of the Year
2016	Car of the Year Japan – Special Award
2016	Business Insider – Car of the Year
2016	Auto Color Awards – Special Award
2017	Road & Track – Performance Car of the Year
2017	Autocar – Best Super Sports Car runner-up
2017	Automobile Magazine – 2017 All-Stars winner
2017	AutoGuide.com – Readers' Choice Car of the Year
2017	International Engine of the Year – Best New Engine
2017	MotorWeek – Drivers' Choice Awards – Best Dream Machine
2017	Green Car Journal – Luxury Green Car of the Year
2017	Golden Steering Wheel – UK readers' best sports car choice
2019	The Car Connection – One of The Best Performing Cars
2020	Motor Trend – Best hybrid performance car
2020	Motor Trend – Rated as having Excellent 5-Year Cost to Own
2022	Autocar – One of the Best Super Sports Cars

Road & Track named the NSX as its 2017 Performance Car of the Year. The magazine lauded the NSX for its use of hybrid technology in the service of an emotional driving experience. The NSX also won the AutoGuide.com Readers' Choice Car of the Year Award for achieving high performance with a natural driving feel. The NSX was the Business Insider 2016 Car of the Year on the strength of its striking styling and its unique drivetrain for a car in its price range. The Green Car Journal 2017 Luxury Green Car of the Year award went to the NSX for its combination of performance and efficiency. Automobile staff voted the NSX to its list of 2017 All-Stars; the car won the honor "by consistently putting a grin on drivers' faces" during testing. Motor Trend awarded the NSX first place in its 2020 hybrid performance car comparison, praising the improvements made to the car by the 2019 update. Autocar listed the Honda NSX as one of the best super sports cars for the year 2022.

== Marketing ==
In September 2011, during filming of The Avengers, Robert Downey, Jr. (playing the role of Iron Man) was spotted in an exotic sports car similar to the new NSX, made specifically for the film, rather than the Audi R8 he previously drove in Iron Man and Iron Man 2. The car itself was built by Trans FX using an existing 1991 NSX. Its design was an altered form of the new NSX's final design in order to avoid leaks and speculations about the new sports car by the media. Also, it is currently owned by Robert Downey Jr.

A Super Bowl advertisement for the vehicle began airing in early February 2012, featuring Jerry Seinfeld and Jay Leno.

In 2013, Acura launched an online configuration tool for the new NSX on Facebook. Later that year, the car was featured in the video game Gran Turismo 6.

Although the original name was retained—which stood for "New Sportscar eXperimental"—the second generation model's name has been defined as "New Sports eXperience".

== Motorsport ==
=== Super GT ===
Honda NSX-GT (2nd generation)
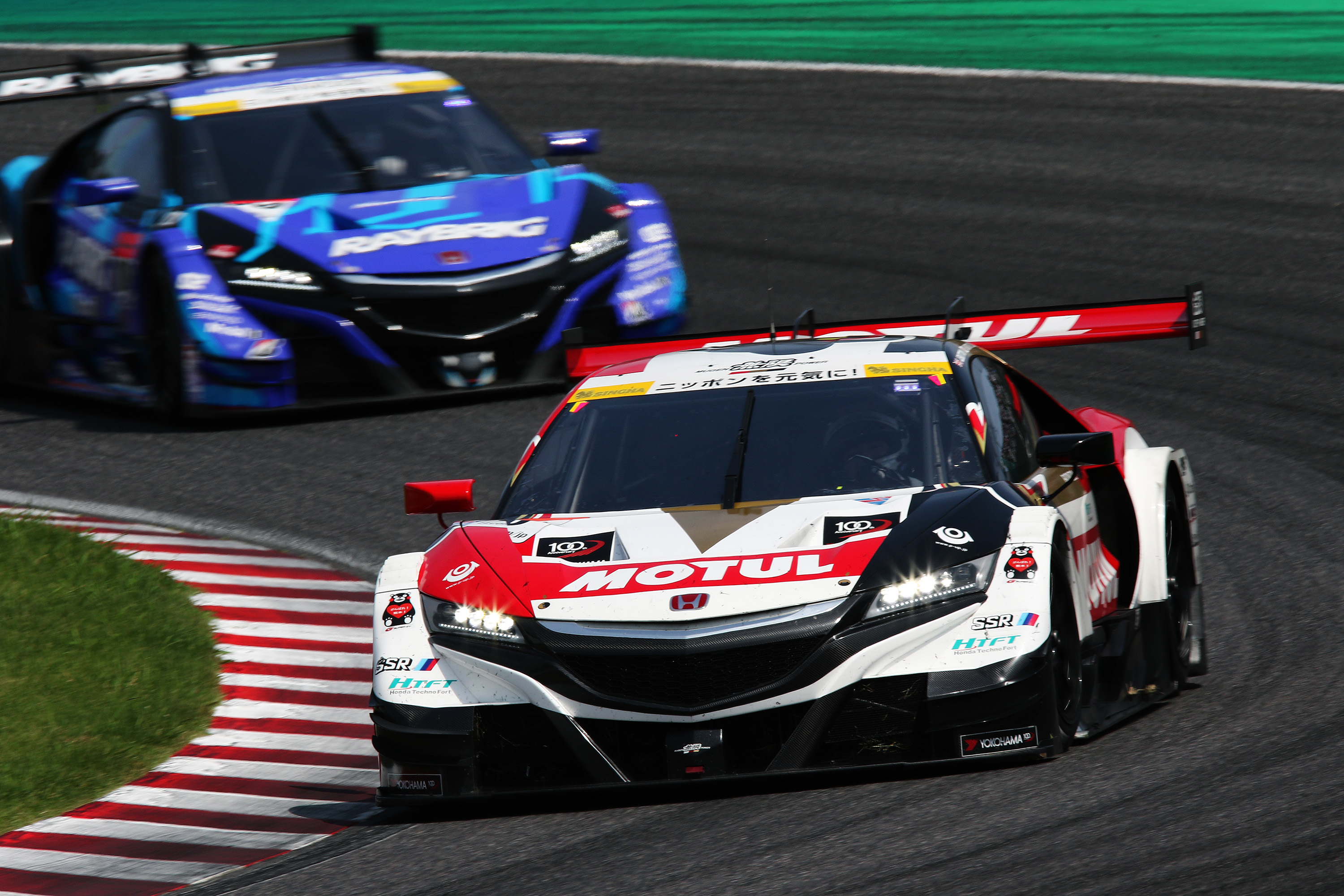
- Honda NSX-GTs in 2017
- Category: Super GT GT500
- Constructor: Honda
- Predecessor: Honda HSV-010 GT
- Successor: Honda Civic Type R-GT

Technical specifications
- Chassis: Carbon-fibre monocoque
- Suspension (front): Double wishbone, pushrod operated, twin dampers and torsion bars
- Suspension (rear): Double wishbone, pushrod operated, twin dampers and spring
- Length: 4,650–4,775 mm (183–188 in) excluding rear wing 5,010 mm (197 in) including rear wing
- Width: 1,950 mm (77 in)
- Height: 1,150 mm (45 in)
- Wheelbase: Standard Class 1 2,750 mm (108 in)
- Engine: Honda HR-414E/HR-417E/HR-420E 1,995 cc (122 cu in) inline-4 single-turbocharged Rear mid-engine, rear-wheel-drive (2014–2019); Front mid-engine, rear-wheel drive (2020–2023)
- Transmission: Hewland 6-speed sequential semi-automatic gearbox
- Power: 483 kW (648 hp; 657 PS)
- Weight: 1,020 + 70 kg (2,249 + 154 lb) hybrid weight (removed since 2016)
- Fuel: Various
- Lubricants: Various
- Brakes: Hydraulic ventilated carbon disk. AP Racing calipers
- Tyres: Bridgestone Potenza, Dunlop Direzza and Yokohama ADVAN; Tan-Ei-Sya/SSR Wheels

Competition history
- Notable entrants: (Japan) Autobacs Racing Team Aguri (Japan) Real Racing (Japan) Dome (Japan) Nakajima Racing (Japan) Team Kunimitsu (Japan) Team Mugen (Japan) Drago Corse
- Notable drivers: (Italy) Vitantonio Liuzzi (Japan) Kosuke Matsuura (Japan) Toshihiro Kaneishi (Japan) Koudai Tsukakoshi (Japan) Naoki Yamamoto (France) Jean-Karl Vernay (France) Frédéric Makowiecki (Japan) Takuya Izawa (Belgium) Bertrand Baguette (Japan) Daisuke Nakajima (Japan) Takashi Kogure (Japan) Hideki Mutoh (Japan) Tomoki Nojiri (United Kingdom) Oliver Turvey (United Kingdom) Jenson Button (Japan) Tadasuke Makino (Japan) Takashi Kobayashi
- Debut: 2014 Okayama GT 300km
Races	Wins	Poles
71	19	21
- Teams' Championships: 2 (2018 & 2020)
- Drivers' Championships: 2 (Jenson Button, Naoki Yamamoto & Tadasuke Makino, 2018 & 2020)

The NSX Concept-GT, a race car based on the NSX concept, was unveiled in 2013 to race in the GT500 category of the Super GT Series from 2014. During the 2014 season, the NSX Concept-GT received its first pole and victory at Fuji Speedway in August, with the best-placed Honda driver fourth in the championship. In 2015, the car won at Sportsland Sugo and finished third in the championship. The car featured a hybrid system in 2014 and 2015, but it was abandoned for the 2016 season, with hybrid systems banned from GT500 in 2017. The 2016 season saw the car score a pole position in Suzuka and three podiums.

In 2017, Honda launched the NSX-GT based on the production version, replacing the NSX Concept-GT. The car won the final running of the Suzuka 1000km in 2017, and in 2018, it won the championship with Jenson Button and Naoki Yamamoto of Team Kunimitsu crowned champions. In an incident-filled 2019, the car won the Okayama round and the second Super GT × DTM Dream Race, which was the mid-engine NSX's final race. Due to regulation changes in accordance with Class One Touring Cars regulations, Honda debuted new NSX-GT with a front-engine layout for the 2020 season. Team Kunimitsu's NSX would win the GT500 title in an upset after the rival TOM'S Toyota GR Supra ran out of fuel at the end of the final lap of the championship race at Fuji Speedway.

At Mobility Resort Motegi during the pre-season testing for the 2022 season, Honda was spied testing new NSX-GT race cars which were based on the NSX Type S. In February 2022, the NSX-GT Type S made its public debut at the Honda Racing "Thanks Day" racing festival at Suzuka Circuit.

On the opening round at Okayama International Circuit, Team Kunimitsu's NSX-GT Type S qualified 3rd on the grid. On the race day the car finished 2nd overall, driven by Naoki Yamamoto and Tadasuke Makino. On the second round at Fuji Speedway, the car scored its first win with team Autobacs Racing Team Aguri (ARTA). Nirei Fukuzumi and Tomoki Nojiri were the drivers who won the round. On the third round at Suzuka International Racing Course, team Astemo Real Racing's #17 car scored another podium by finishing the race in 2nd, driven by Nobuharu Matsushita and Koudai Tsukakoshi, the team also was in fight with two other Nissan Z GT500 drivers for the championship heading onto the last race. The car managed to win the championship decider starting from pole position, but failed to win the championship, ended the season 3rd in standings.

=== GT3 ===
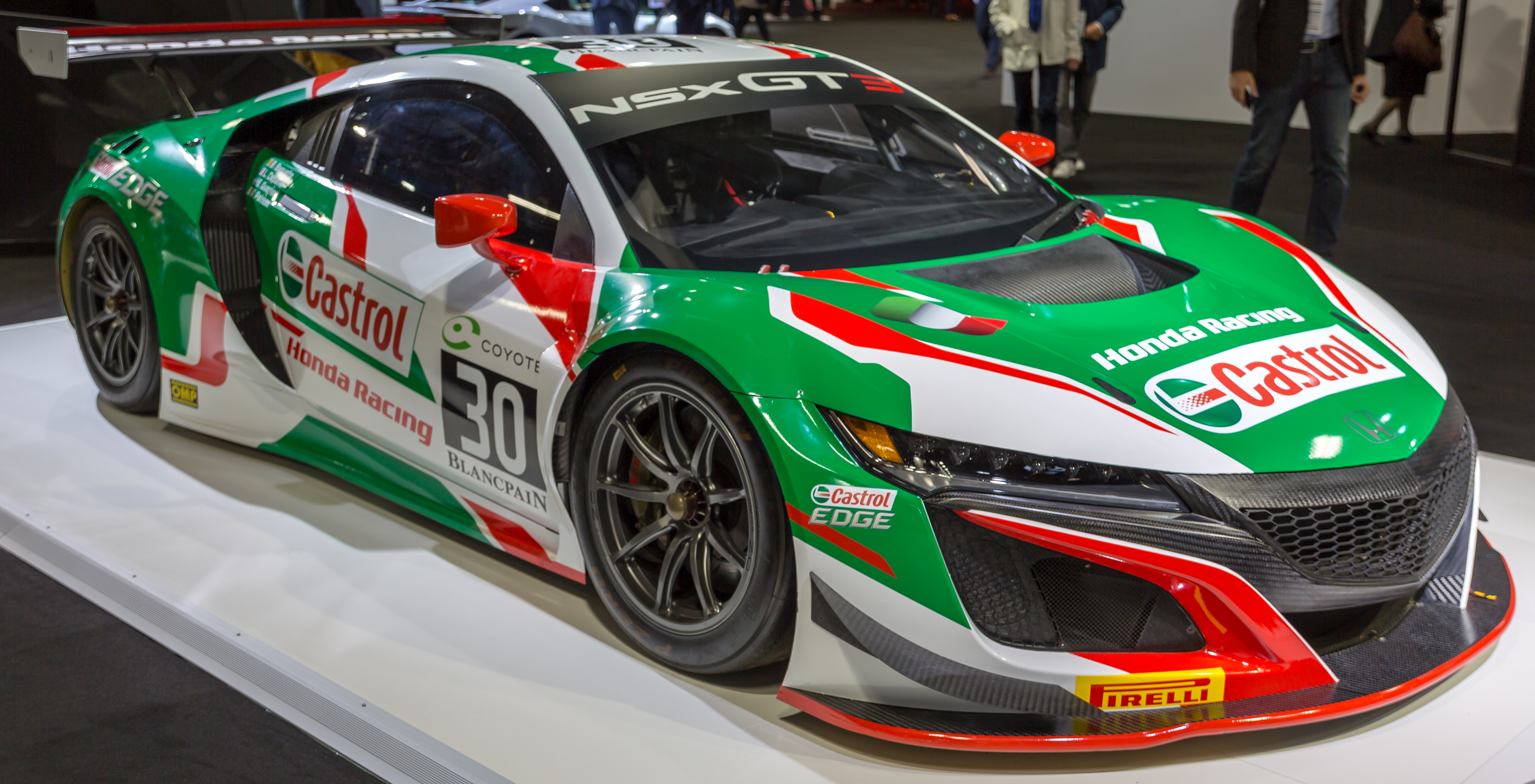
The NSX GT3 on display at the 2018 Paris Motor Show.

At the 2016 New York International Auto Show, Honda announced the GT3 version of the NSX, to begin competition in 2017. During its first season of racing in 2017, the NSX GT3 scored its first race victory in the IMSA SportsCar Championship GTD class at Belle Isle, followed by another win at the following round of the championship, the 6 Hours of Watkins Glen. It also won the Utah round of the Pirelli World Challenge. For the following year in 2018, the car finished second in the IMSA GTD championship with two wins. It made its debut in the Japanese Super GT Series, scoring a podium in Autopolis. The car also made its debut at the 24 Hours of Spa, finishing the 24-hour race seventh in the Pro-Am class.

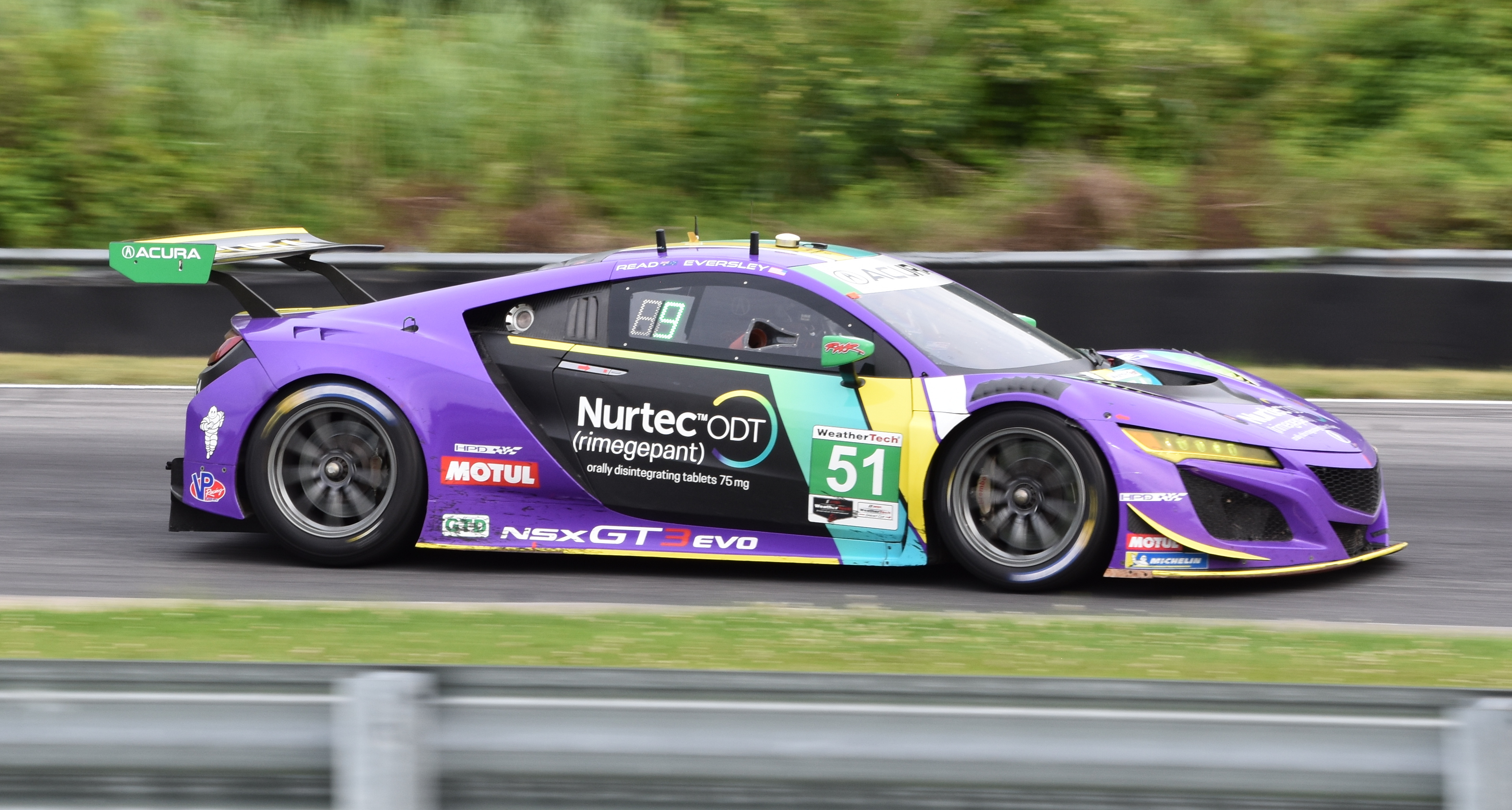
The NSX GT3 Evo of Rick Ware Racing at Lime Rock Park.

Honda introduced an upgraded version of the car, the NSX GT3 Evo, for 2019. Its upgrades include improved aerodynamics and cooling, as well as new turbochargers. The car had a successful debut year, winning the 2019 IMSA SportsCar Championship GTD drivers' and teams' titles, as well as the 2019 Super GT drivers' and teams' titles in the GT300 class. The NSX GT3 Evo successfully defended its IMSA titles in 2020, winning back-to-back drivers' and teams' titles, as well as the manufacturers' championship. The car also won several championships in SRO's GT World Challenge America, winning Pro-Am drivers' and teams' titles in 2019, and overall manufacturers', drivers' and teams' titles in 2020. In the Intercontinental GT Challenge, the car scored two pole positions, a podium at the 2020 Indianapolis 8 Hours, an overall top-six finish at the 2019 24 Hours of Spa, and dominated the 2020 Kyalami 9 Hours until heavy rain shuffled the order with an hour remaining. Other successes for the car include winning the 2019 Blancpain GT Sports Club title and race wins in the Italian GT Championship and International GT Open.

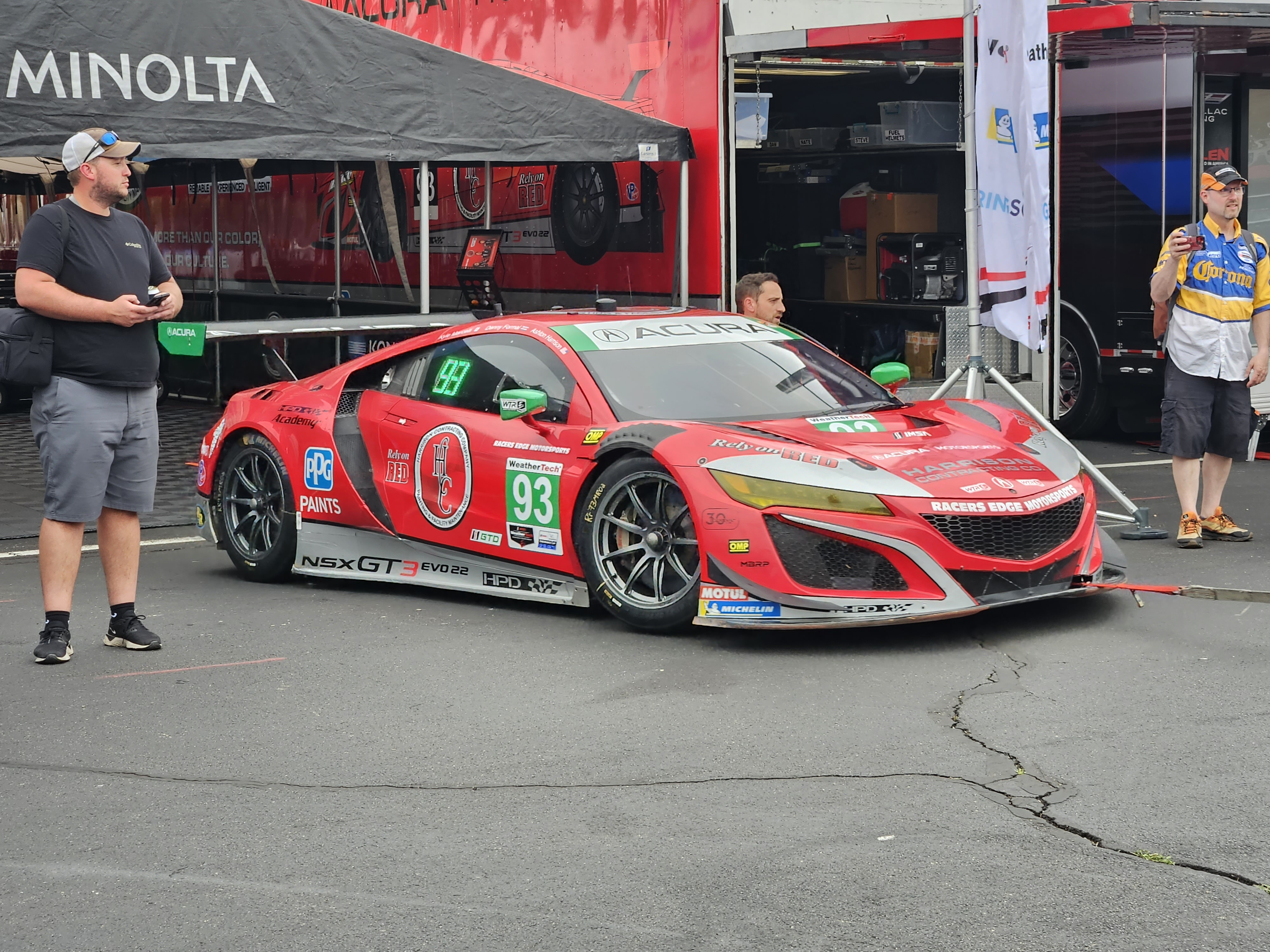
The NSX GT3 Evo22 of Racers Edge Motorsports at Watkins Glen International.

Another upgraded version of the car was introduced for 2022, the NSX GT3 Evo22. The upgrades include improved intercoolers, re-tuned suspension, new wheel system revisions, optional headlight variants along with FIA-mandated rain lights and air conditioning system. Production of the NSX GT3 Evo22 is handled by JAS Motorsport using chassis resources from Marysville, Ohio plant. The car is expected to compete in racing globally until 2024. In IMSA, the car took victory at the 2022 edition of the Petit Le Mans endurance race with Gradient Racing, who were the overall winner among all the GT entries. The 2022 GT World Challenge America season saw the Racers Edge Motorsports NSX GT3 Evo22 win the Pro-Am championship with drivers Mario Farnbacher and Ashton Harrison. The car scored four race wins, four pole positions, and eight podium finishes during the season. During the 2022 season of the Le Mans Cup, GMB Motorsport took five victories with the car – including at the Road to Le Mans – to win the drivers' and teams' championships. It also claimed four wins on the road in Super GT between 2022 and 2023 with ARTA and Team UpGarage. Honda would cease factory support for the NSX GT3 at the end of 2024. JAS Motorsport would continue to support existing NSX GT3s in Europe.

In 2025, JAS Motorsport and Nova Race created a further evolution of the Honda NSX GT3, dubbed the Evo25. This car races under a national GT3 homologation in the Italian GT Championship.

In 2026, The JAS Motorsport-built Honda NSX GT3 Evo 22 continued its run of success by winning the Thailand Super Series, supercar GT3 Crown. This brought the NSX GT3 including all evolutions of the platform, to a total of 27 major global crowns.

=== Production car ===
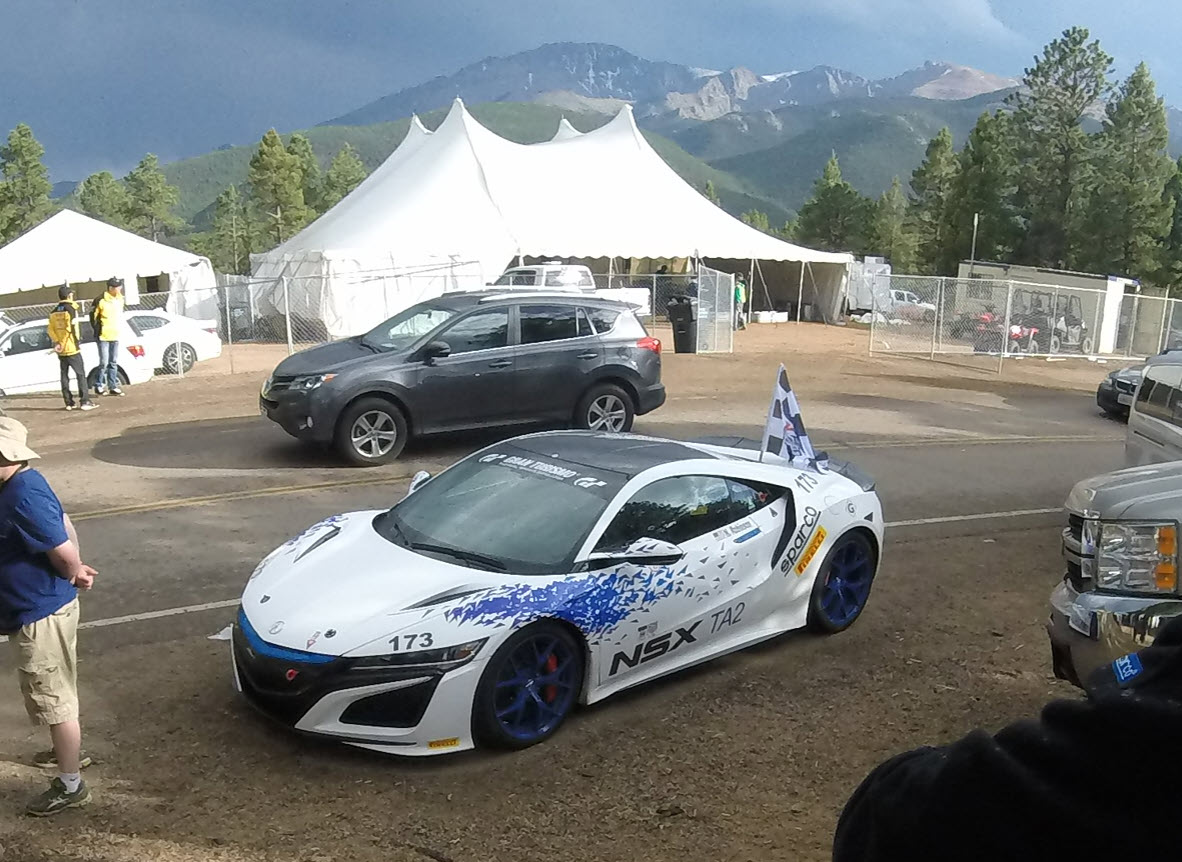
2017 NSX after TA2 class win at the 2016 PPIHC

A production-based 2017 Acura NSX won the Time Attack 2 production-class at the 2016 Pikes Peak International Hill Climb on June 26, 2016. The 2017 Acura NSX Time Attack 2 car won the class with a time of 10:28.820, over 11 sec ahead of the 2nd placed Viper ACR. This was the first North American and International race win for the production-based second generation NSX.

== Sales ==
Honda has sold 2,908 NSX units worldwide (including 350 units of Type S models).

From a total of 350 Type S units, VIN #001—#300 were designated for deliveries in the United States with 50 of them were painted in Gotham Grey body color, VIN #301—#330 were scheduled for deliveries in Japan with 15 of them in Gotham Grey, VIN #331—#345 delivered to Canada with 5 Gotham Grey vehicles and VIN #346—350 deliveries were currently unknown.

Calendar year	Canada	Europe	US
2016	50	—	269
2017	49	126	581
2018	47	45	170
2019	22	36	238
2020	25	8	128
2021	23	3	124
2022	15	—	298
2023	—	—	5

European sales statistics are from the following countries: Austria, Belgium, Cyprus, Czech Republic, Denmark, Estonia, Finland, France, Germany, Great Britain, Greece, Hungary, Iceland, Ireland, Italy, Latvia, Lithuania, Luxembourg, Netherlands, Norway, Poland, Portugal, Romania, Slovakia, Slovenia, Spain, Sweden, Switzerland.

== Replacement ==
On August 23, 2021, at the Monterey Car Week, Acura's Vice President and Brand Officer Jon Ikeda said in an interview with The Drive that the second generation NSX will be succeeded by a next-generation model, stating, "If you notice, we make an NSX when there's something we want to say. The first-gen was gas. Second-gen was a hybrid. There's gonna be another one." Ikeda hinted that the successor will be powered by an all-electric powertrain.
