= 2014 Okayama GT 300km =

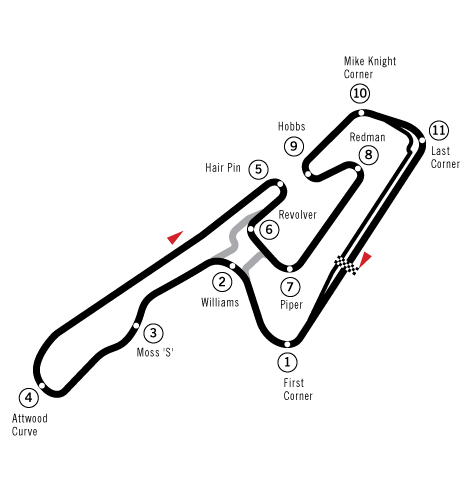
Layout of the Okayama International Circuit

The 2014 Okayama GT 300 km was the first round of the 2014 Super GT season. It took place on April 6, 2014.

== Race result ==
Race result is as follows.

Pos	No	Team	Drivers	Chassis	Tyre	Time/Difference	Laps
GT500
1	37	Lexus Team KeePer TOM'S	(Italy) Andrea Caldarelli (Japan) Daisuke Ito	Lexus RC F	B	1:57:15.816	81
2	6	Lexus Team LeMans ENEOS	(Japan) Yuji Kunimoto (Japan) Kazuya Oshima	Lexus RC F	B	+5.026	81
3	12	Calsonic Team Impul	(Brazil) Joao Paulo de Oliveira (Japan) Hironobu Yasuda	Nissan GT-R	B	+18.818	81
4	39	Lexus Team SARD	(Japan) Hiroaki Ishiura (United Kingdom) Oliver Jarvis	Lexus RC F	B	+21.475	81
5	18	Weider Modulo Dome Racing	(France) Jean-Karl Vernay (Japan) Naoki Yamamoto	Honda NSX-GT	MI	+23.259	81
6	17	Keihin Real Racing	(Japan) Toshihiro Kaneishi (Japan) Koudai Tsukakoshi	Honda NSX-GT	B	+31.039	81
7	23	Nismo	(Italy) Ronnie Quintarelli (Japan) Tsugio Matsuda	Nissan GT-R	MI	+31.367	81
8	8	Autobacs Racing Team Aguri	(Italy) Vitantonio Liuzzi (Japan) Kosuke Matsuura	Honda NSX-GT	B	+1:07.608	81
9	100	Team Kunimitsu	(Japan) Takashi Kogure (Japan) Hideki Mutoh	Honda NSX-GT	B	+1 Lap	80
10	46	MOLA	(Japan) Satoshi Motoyama (Japan) Masataka Yanagida	Nissan GT-R	MI	+1 Lap	80
11	19	Lexus Team WedsSport BANDOH	(Japan) Yuhi Sekiguchi (Japan) Juichi Wakisaka	Lexus RC F	Y	+1 Lap	80
12	24	Kondo Racing	(Germany) Michael Krumm (Japan) Daiki Sasaki	Nissan GT-R	Y	+1 Lap	80
13	36	Lexus Team Petronas TOM'S	(Japan) Kazuki Nakajima (United Kingdom) James Rossiter	Lexus RC F	B	+2 Laps	79
14	1	Lexus Team Zent Cerumo	(Japan) Kohei Hirate (Japan) Yuji Tachikawa	Lexus RC F	B	+4 Laps	77
15	32	Epson Nakajima Racing	(Japan) Daisuke Nakajima (Belgium) Bertrand Baguette	Honda NSX-GT	D	+6 Laps	75
GT300
1	4	GSR & Team Ukyo	(Japan) Nobuteru Taniguchi (Japan) Tatsuya Kataoka	BMW Z4 GT3	Y	1:58:28.101	77
2	7	BMW Sports Trophy Team Studie	(Japan) Seiji Ara (Germany) Jörg Müller	BMW Z4 GT3	Y	+0.329	77
3	11	Gainer	(Japan) Katsuyuki Hiranaka (Sweden) Björn Wirdheim	Mercedes-Benz SLS AMG GT3	D	+1 Lap	76
4	3	NDDP Racing with B-MAX	(Japan) Kazuki Hoshino (Spain) Lucas Ordóñez	Nissan GT-R GT3	Y	+1 Lap	76
5	65	Leon Racing	(Japan) Haruki Kurosawa (Japan) Kyosuke Mineo	Mercedes-Benz SLS AMG GT3	Y	+1 Lap	76
6	55	Autobacs Racing Team Aguri	(Japan) Takashi Kobayashi (Japan) Shinichi Takagi	Honda CR-Z	B	+1 Lap	76
7	86	JLOC	(Japan) Shinya Hosokawa (Japan) Koji Yamanishi	Lamborghini Gallardo GT3	Y	+2 Laps	75
8	21	Audi Sport Team Hitotsuyama	(Japan) Tomonobu Fujii (United Kingdom) Richard Lyons	Audi R8 LMS ultra	Y	+2 Laps	75
9	0	Team Mugen	(Japan) Yuhki Nakayama (Japan) Tomoki Nojiri	Honda CR-Z	B	+2 Laps	75
10	10	Gainer	(Japan) Masayuki Ueda (Japan) Hideki Yamauchi	Mercedes-Benz SLS AMG GT3	D	+2 Laps	75
11	88	JLOC	(Japan) Takayuki Aoki (Japan) Manabu Orido	Lamborghini Gallardo GT3	Y	+2 Laps	75
12	9	Pacific Racing Team	(Japan) Yuya Sakamoto (Japan) Takuya Shirasaka	Porsche 911 GT3	Y	+2 Laps	75
13	50	Arnage Racing	(Japan) Masaki Kano (Japan) Hideto Yasuoka	Aston Martin V12 Vantage GT3	Y	+2 Laps	75
14	2	Cars Tokai Dream28	(Japan) Hiroki Katoh (Japan) Kazuho Takahashi	McLaren MP4-12C GT3	Y	+3 Laps	74
15	5	Team Mach	(Japan) Tetsuji Tamanaka (Japan) Junichiro Yamashita	Nissan GT-R GT3	Y	+3 Laps	74
16	360	Tomei Sports	(Japan) Atsushi Tanaka (Japan) Hiroki Yoshida	Nissan GT-R GT3	Y	+3 Laps	74
17	33	Porsche Team KTR	(Germany) Tim Bergmeister (Japan) Akihiro Tsuzuki	Porsche 911 GT3	Y	+3 Laps	74
18	48	Dijon Racing	(Japan) Hiroshi Takamori (Japan) Masaki Tanaka	Nissan GT-R GT3	Y	+3 Laps	74
19	67	Team Taisan	(Japan) Shogo Mitsuyama (Japan) Naoki Yokomizo	Nissan GT-R GT3	Y	+6 Laps	71
20	22	R'Qs MotorSports	(Japan) Takeshi Tsuchiya (Japan) Hisashi Wada	Mercedes-Benz SLS AMG GT3	Y	+8 Laps	69
21	61	R&D Sport	(Japan) Takuto Iguchi (Japan) Kota Sasaki	Subaru BRZ	MI	+14 Laps	63
22	60	LM corsa	(Japan) Akira Iida (Japan) Hiroki Yoshimoto	BMW Z4 GT3	Y	+19 Laps	58
Ret	31	apr	(Japan) Morio Nitta (Japan) Koki Saga	Toyota Prius	Y	+55 Laps	22
Ret	30	apr	(Japan) Yuki Iwasaki (Japan) Masami Kageyama	Nissan GT-R GT3	Y	+75 Laps	2

- GT500 Fastest Lap – Kazuya Oshima, #6 Lexus Team LeMans ENEOS Lexus RC F – 1:21.977
- GT300 Fastest Lap – Morio Nitta, #31 apr Toyota Prius – 1:28.931

Super GT
Previous race: None	2014 season	Next race: Fuji GT 500km
