= Bundesautobahn 980 =

Federal motorway in Germany

A 980
- Bundesautobahn 980

Route information
- Length: 5 km (3.1 mi)

Location
- Country: Germany
- States: Bavaria

Highway system
- Roads in Germany; Autobahns; List; Federal; List; State; E-roads

Bundesautobahn 980 (translates from German as Federal Motorway 980, short form Autobahn 980, abbreviated as BAB 980 or A 980) is an autobahn in southern Germany. It runs through the Allgäu and is part of the once-proposed A 98 plans that were never carried out.

== Exit list ==
State	District	Location	km	mi	Exit	Name	Destinations	Notes
Bayern	Oberallgäu	Waltenhofen	0	0.0	—		B 12 – Lindau	western endpoint of motorway
Bayern	Oberallgäu	Waltenhofen	0	0.0	3	Waltenhofen	B 19 – Waltenhofen, Oberstdorf, Sonthofen, Immenstadt, Kempten	Sonthofen only signed westbound
Bayern	Oberallgäu	Sulzberg	3.0	1.9	2	Durach	Durach, Kempten-St. Mang, Sulzberg	
Bayern	Oberallgäu	Sulzberg	7.2	4.5	1	Dreieck Allgäu	A 7 – Ulm, München, Augsburg, Stuttgart (southbound); A 7 – Innsbruck, Reutte, Füssen, Oy-Mittelberg (northbound)	
1.000 mi = 1.609 km; 1.000 km = 0.621 mi: Concurrency terminus; Incomplete access; Proposed; Route transition
