= Sulzberg =

Sulzberg or Sulzburg may refer to:

- Sulzberg, Austria, a municipality in Vorarlberg, Austria
- Sulzberg, Oberallgäu, a municipality in Oberallgäu, Germany
- Sulzberg (Mangfall Mountains), a mountain in the Bavarian Alps, Germany
- Sulzberg (Lower Bavaria), a mountain in Bavaria, Germany
- Sulzberg, a Swiss Heritage Site in Untereggen, St. Gallen, Switzerland
- Sulzburg, a city in Breisgau-Hochschwarzwald, Baden-Württemberg, Germany
