= Waltenhofen =

Municipality in Bavaria, Germany

- Municipality
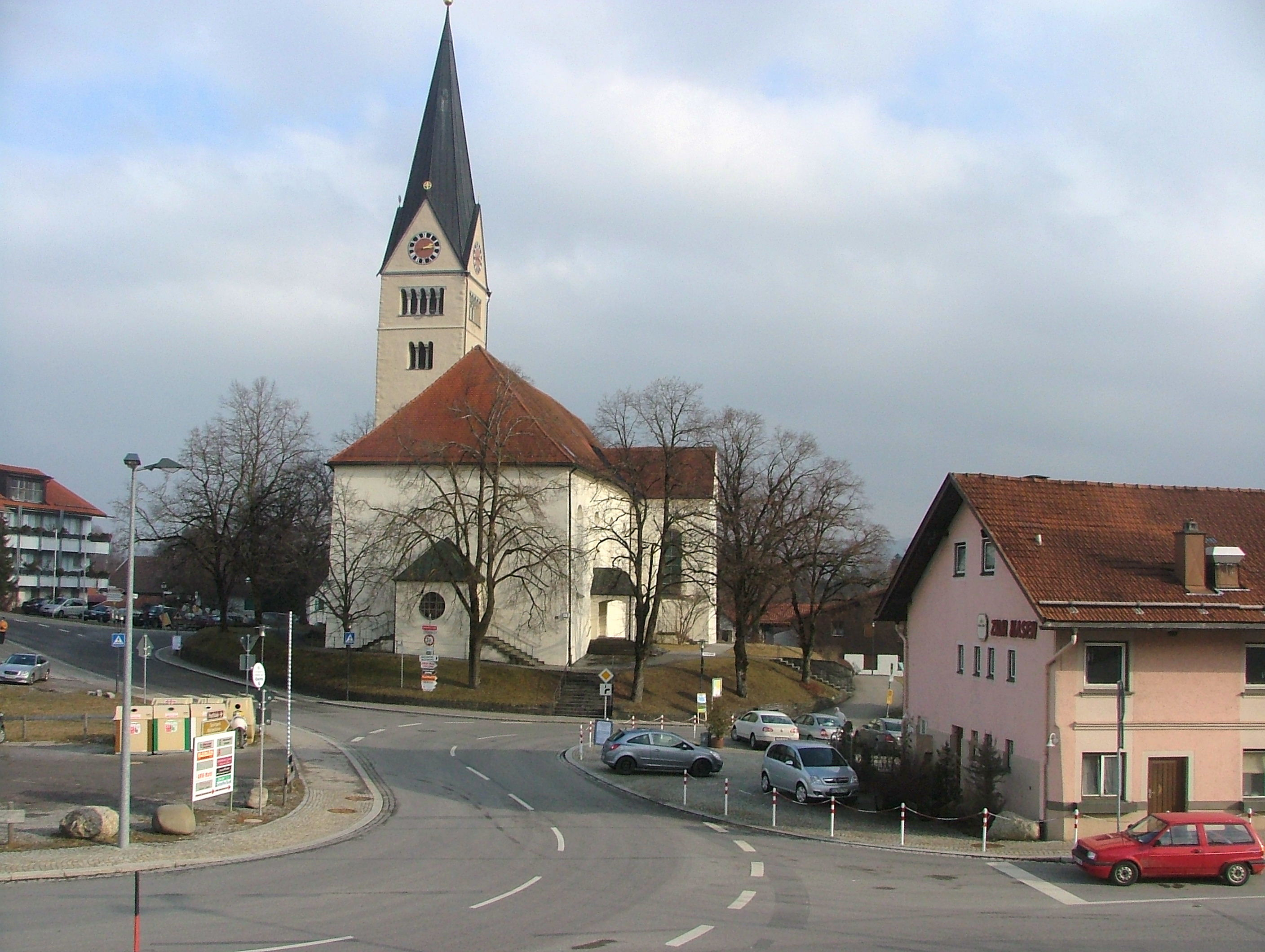
- View of the parish church in Waltenhofen

- Coat of arms

- Location of Waltenhofen within Oberallgäu district
- Interactive map of Waltenhofen
- Location within Germany Location within Bavaria
- Coordinates: 47°40′23″N 10°18′22″E
- Country: Germany
- State: Bavaria
- Admin. region: Schwaben
- District: Oberallgäu

Government
  - Mayor (2024–30): Stefan Sommer (CSU)

Area
  - Total: 59.75 km^{2} (23.07 sq mi)
- Elevation: 722 m (2,369 ft)

Population (2025-12-31)
  - Total: 9,787
  - Density: 163.8/km^{2} (424.2/sq mi)
- Time zone: UTC+01:00 (CET)
  - Summer (DST): UTC+02:00 (CEST)
- Postal codes: 87448
- Dialling codes: 08303
- Vehicle registration: OA
- Website: www.waltenhofen.de

Waltenhofen is a municipality in the district of Oberallgäu, in Swabia, Bavaria, Germany. As of 30 September 2025, it had 9,827 inhabitants. The municipality lies in the Allgäu between Kempten and Immenstadt.

== Geography ==
Waltenhofen extends between Kempten to the north and Immenstadt to the south, and also borders the municipalities of Durach and Sulzberg to the east and Buchenberg and Weitnau to the west. The municipality ranges in elevation from 720 to 1,063 metres above sea level; the Stoffelberg is the highest point in the municipal area.

The municipality's better-known districts are Waltenhofen, Hegge, Lanzen, Martinszell, Memhölz, Niedersonthofen, Oberdorf and Rauns. The municipal website and BayernPortal describe Martinszell, Memhölz and Niedersonthofen together as part of the recreational area around the Niedersonthofener See. BayernPortal lists many additional officially named Ortsteile (localities), including hamlets and isolated farmsteads.

The present municipality also consists of four cadastral districts (Gemarkungen): Waltenhofen, Memhölz, Niedersonthofen and Martinszell i.Allgäu.

== History ==
The historical place-name database Geschichte Bayerns records early forms of the name including Waltinhovin (around 1200), Waltenhouen (1274–1275), and Waltenhofen (1419).

According to the Haus der Bayerischen Geschichte, Waltenhofen later came into the possession of the lords of Rauns and, by inheritance in 1464, passed to the family of Werdenstein, which also held the patronage of the churches in Rauns and Waltenhofen.

The district of Hegge was first mentioned in 1543 in connection with a paper mill. Because of its favourable location near Kempten, it later experienced strong industrial growth; after the Second World War, further population growth helped lead to the construction of a new parish church there.

=== Municipal reform ===
During the municipal reform in Bavaria, Waltenhofen was enlarged by the incorporation of Memhölz on 1 January 1972, Niedersonthofen on 1 January 1976, and Martinszell im Allgäu on 1 April 1976.

== Demographics ==
Official Bavarian statistics record the population of Waltenhofen at 3,148 in 1840, 7,969 in 1987, 8,847 in 2011 and 9,759 in 2021.

== Economy and infrastructure ==
Land use in Waltenhofen remains strongly shaped by agriculture, woodland and water surfaces. At the end of 2021, 59.6% of the municipal area was agricultural land, 20.7% was forest and 4.9% consisted of water surfaces.

At 30 June 2021, official statistics recorded 2,565 employees subject to social insurance contributions working in the municipality and 4,101 such employees resident in Waltenhofen.

Tourism also plays a role in the local economy. In 2021, Waltenhofen had 21 accommodation establishments with ten or more guest beds, offering 450 beds; these establishments recorded 11,910 guest arrivals and 57,205 overnight stays.

=== Education ===
The municipality lists three school sites: the combined primary and middle school in Waltenhofen, the primary school in Hegge, and the primary school in Oberdorf/Martinszell. Official school statistics for 2021/22 record four public primary and lower-secondary schools in the municipality, with 26 teachers and 440 pupils.

In 2022, Waltenhofen had six childcare facilities with 509 approved places and 464 children in care.

=== Transport ===
The municipality is served by Martinszell (Allgäu) station in the Oberdorf district. Waltenhofen also has road connections to the Bundesstraße 19 and the Bundesautobahn 980.

== Notable buildings ==
The main Roman Catholic parish church in Waltenhofen is St. Martin, described by the municipality as a late-Baroque church of 1770.

Other notable churches in the municipality include:

- St. Alexander and George in Niedersonthofen, described by the municipality as one of the district's most important late-Gothic churches;
- St. Cosmas and Damian in Rauns, a church with Romanesque, Gothic and Baroque elements dating in its present form to the 14th century;
- Maria, Queen of the Apostles in Hegge, consecrated in 1951.
