= Audi 5 Series DTM =

Touring racing car by Audi

Audi A5 DTM R17 (2012) Audi RS5 DTM R17 (2013) Audi RS5 DTM RC3 (2014–2018)
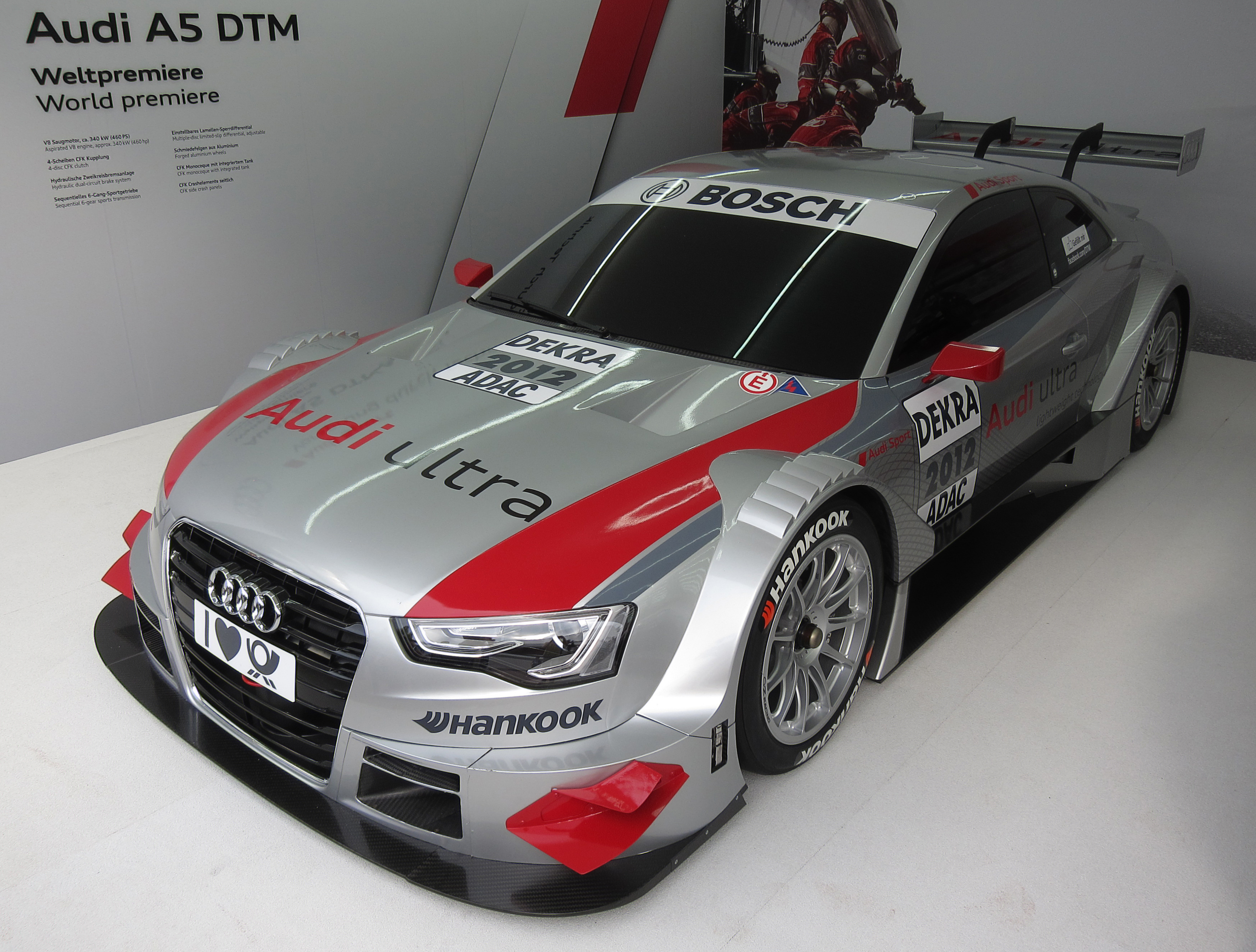
- Audi A5 DTM
- Category: Deutsche Tourenwagen Masters (Touring Cars)
- Constructor: (Germany) Audi
- Designer(s): Wolfgang Dürheimer
- Predecessor: Audi A4 DTM
- Successor: Audi RS5 Turbo DTM

Technical specifications

Competition history
- Notable entrants: (Germany) Team Rosberg (Germany) Abt Sportsline (Germany) Phoenix Racing (Germany) Audi Sport Team Abt (Belgium) Audi Sport Team W Racing Team
- Notable drivers: (Italy) Edoardo Mortara (Portugal) Filipe Albuquerque (Sweden) Mattias Ekström (United Kingdom) Jamie Green (Germany) Mike Rockenfeller (Spain) Miguel Molina (Germany) Timo Scheider (France) Adrien Tambay (Switzerland) Rahel Frey (Switzerland) Nico Müller (Italy) Antonio Giovinazzi (Germany) René Rast (France) Loïc Duval (Netherlands) Robin Frijns
- Debut: 2012 Hockenheimring 1 Deutsche Tourenwagen Masters round
Races	Wins	Poles	F/Laps
102 (including non-championship race at Olympiastadion Munich)	40	30	44
- Constructors' Championships: 3 (2014, 2016 and 2017)
- Drivers' Championships: 2 (2013 and 2017)

The Audi 5 Series DTM (also known as the Audi A5 DTM (2012) later Audi RS5 DTM (2013–2018)) is a touring car constructed by the German car manufacturer Audi AG for use in the Deutsche Tourenwagen Masters. It was developed in 2011 and has been raced in DTM seasons 2012-2018 before being replaced by updated turbo version of Audi RS5 Turbo DTM from 2019 season onwards. It was designed by former Audi Head of Research and Development Wolfgang Dürheimer. The A5 DTM replaced the retired Audi A4 DTM at the end of the 2011 season and based on the production Audi A5.

== A5 DTM ==
Audi began development, design and construction of the A5 DTM chassis in October 2010. The first A5 DTM chassis was assembled in May 2011, with the first vehicle completed in late-July. Codenamed R17 it was intended to see its first race in the 2012 DTM season. Replacing the successful A4 DTM which had been raced since 2004, the A5 had large shoes to fill. Built by Audi Sport in Ingolstadt, the completed A5 DTM was revealed at Frankfurt Motor Show on 12 September 2011.

The A5 DTM was still fitted with a V8 engine that used in a previous Audi A4 DTM and Abt-Audi TT DTM were built jointly by Audi and Neil Brown Engineering (NBE) rated at 460 hp (343 kW) and coupled to a 6-speed transmission grafted from the previous A4 DTM car. It features steering wheel-mounted paddle shifters, engine electronics (Bosch MS 5.1) and the central display from the Audi R8 LMS, larger and wider tires from Hankook, 32-gallons safety fuel tank inside carbon fiber cell, and a large rear wing. In accordance with DTM regulations, side-impact zones designed by Zylon and Rohacell are incorporated into construction of the car. The fuel tank is also integrated into the carbon fiber monocoque for greater safety and reduced fire risk.

At the beginning of the 2012 season, homologation rules for DTM cars were changed, and an increase in minimum weight from 1,050 kg (2,315 lb) to 1,110 kg (2,447 lb) was mandated.

=== Debut ===
With the homologation of the A5 DTM completed on 1 March 2012, the car's race debut was at the 2012 Hockenheimring DTM round on 29 April 2012. Audi Sport Team Abt's Mattias Ekström won the pole only.

=== Teams and drivers ===
In the 2012 DTM season lined-up eight drivers on for three teams. Mattias Ekström, Timo Scheider, Adrien Tambay and Rahel Frey start for Abt Sportsline. Phoenix Racing approached with Miguel Molina and Mike Rockenfeller. Filipe Albuquerque and Edoardo Mortara raced for Team Rosberg.

In the 2013 DTM season lined-up eight drivers on for four teams. Mattias Ekström and Jamie Green start for Abt Sportsline. Mike Rockenfeller and Miguel Molina for Phoenix Racing. Timo Scheider and Adrien Tambay start for Audi Sport Team Abt. Filipe Albuquerque and Edoardo Mortara start for Team Rosberg.

== RS5 DTM ==
After the 2012 season, the vehicle was renamed RS5 DTM, correspond with the Audi RS5 production model. It is powered by a naturally-aspirated engine and 2xDOHC camshafts. The engine itself is a custom-built Audi 4.0 L V8 with four valves per cylinder and a 90 degree V-angle. It has a power output of approximately 460 hp (343 kW; 466 PS) and torque of 500 N⋅m (369 lbf⋅ft). Front longitudinally mounted engine layout, the RS5's engine is indirect fuel injected. The RS5 DTM's ECU is a Bosch Motronic MS 5.1 and other components such as the CDI ignition are also supplied by Bosch. Audi RS5 DTM's debut during DTM preseason test at Circuit de Catalunya on 26–28 March 2013 by all Audi teams and drivers.

The Audi RS5 DTM's race debut was at the 2013 Hockenheimring DTM round on 5 May 2013. Audi Sport Team Abt's Timo Scheider won the pole only.

On 4 March 2014, the RS5 DTM was redesigned and launched during 2014 Geneva Motor Show. During development, the vehicle was codenamed "RC3."

After the 2018 2nd Hockenheimring rounds and Jerez post-season testing of the Deutsche Tourenwagen Masters, the Audi RS5 DTM machine was permanently retired from competition and replaced with the newly-turbo updated Audi RS5 Turbo DTM machine starting from the 2019 season.

== Production Edition ==
The Audi A5 DTM is special version of the standard Audi A5 production car. It was revealed at the 2013 International Motor Show at Geneva on 6 March 2013, in celebration of Mike Rockenfeller's 2013 DTM overall victory. It includes a choice of 4 engines (2.0 TDI quattro (177 PS (130 kW)), 3.0 TDI quattro (245 PS (180 kW)), 2.0 TFSI quattro (225 PS (165 kW)), and 3.0 TFSI quattro (272 PS (200 kW))); a choice of 3 body colours (Misano red, Daytona gray and Glacier white), DTM badges on the door sill trims, fenders and the side sills; a fixed rear wing in body color, exterior mirrors in aluminum look, and 20-inch cast aluminum wheels in a 5 V-spoke design. Only 300 such vehicles were built.

The vehicle went on sale on 21 October 2013.

== Gallery ==
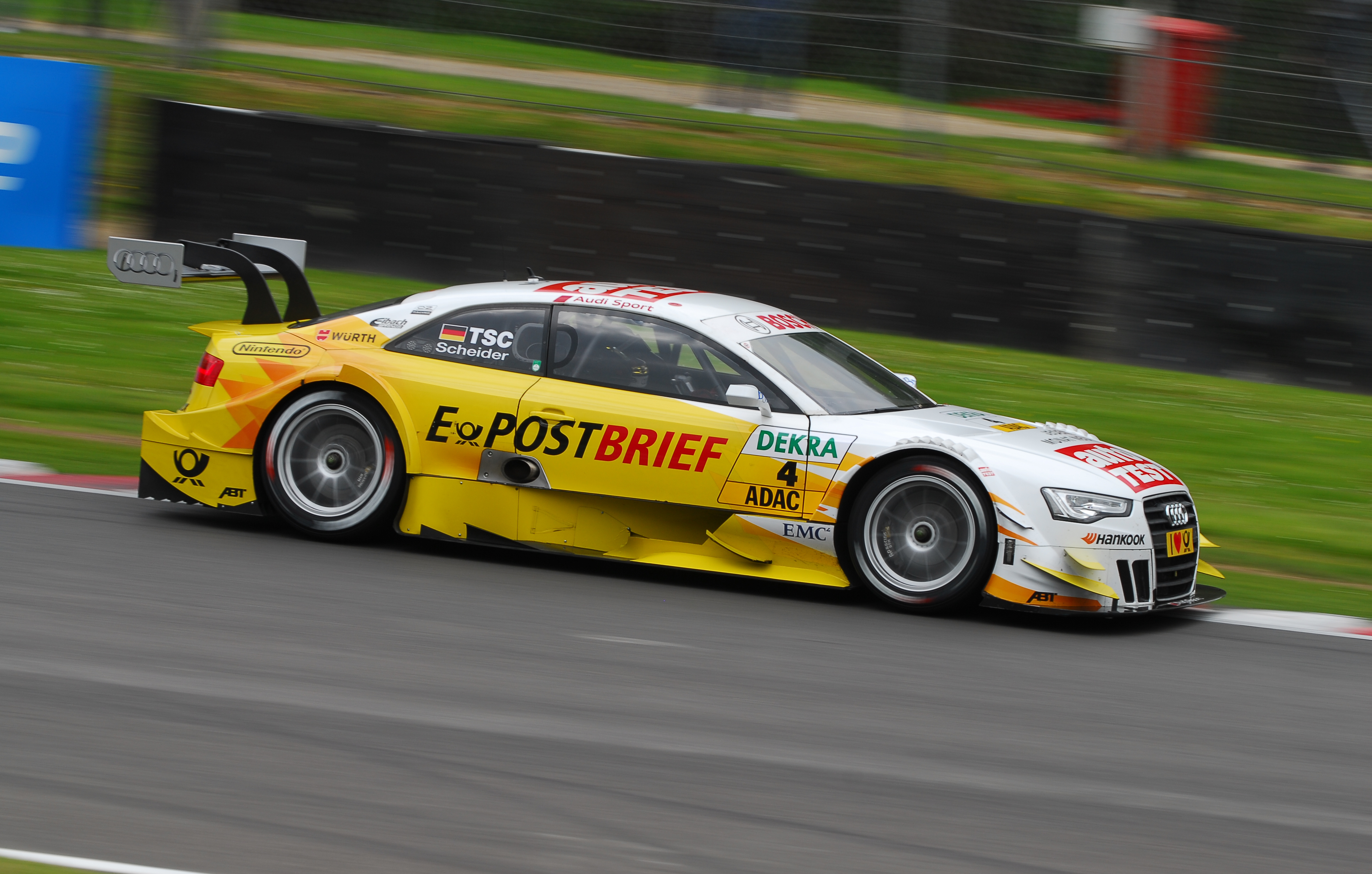
2012 A5 DTM (Timo Scheider)

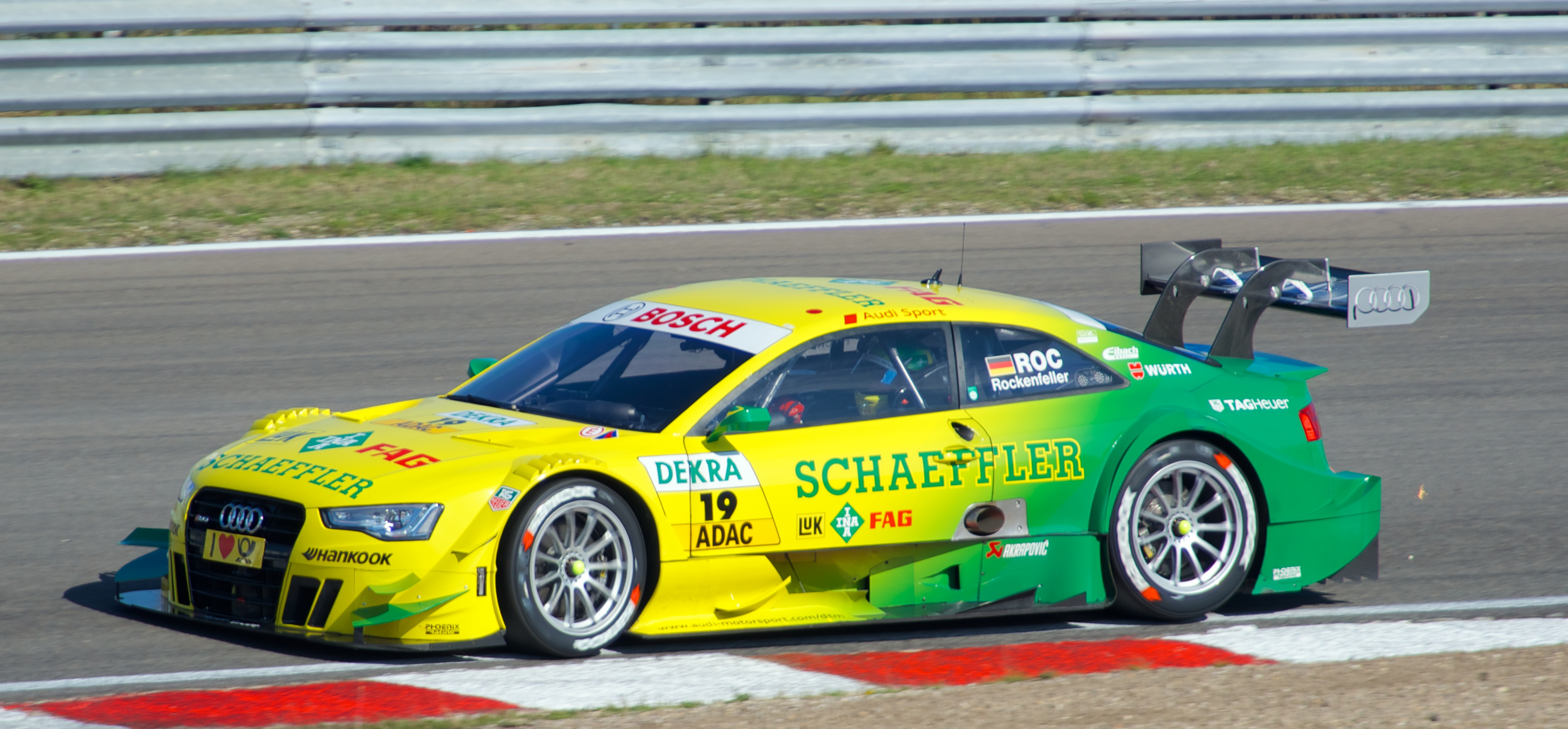
2013 RS5 DTM R17 (Mike Rockenfeller)
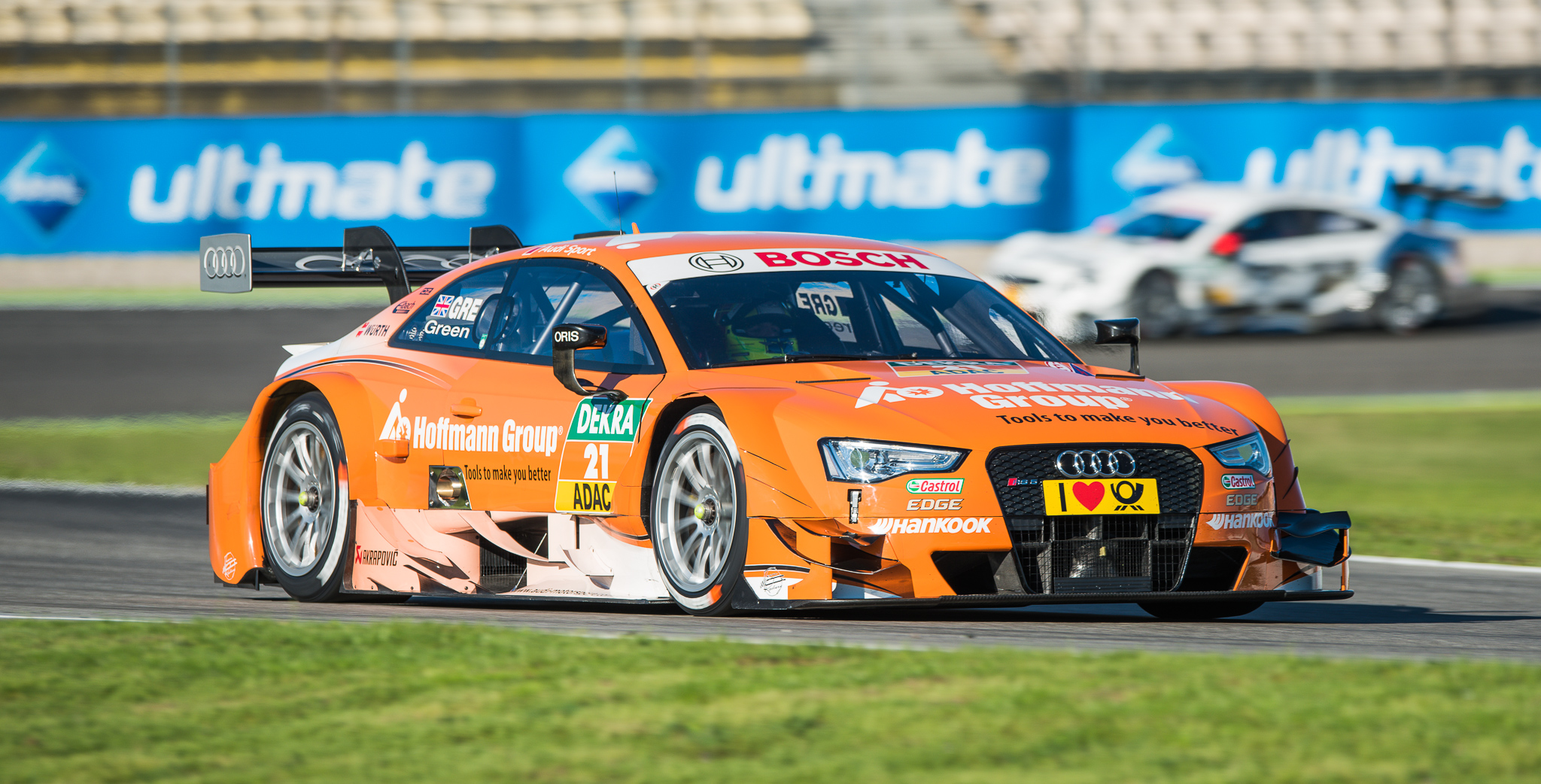
2014 RS5 DTM RC3 (Jamie Green)

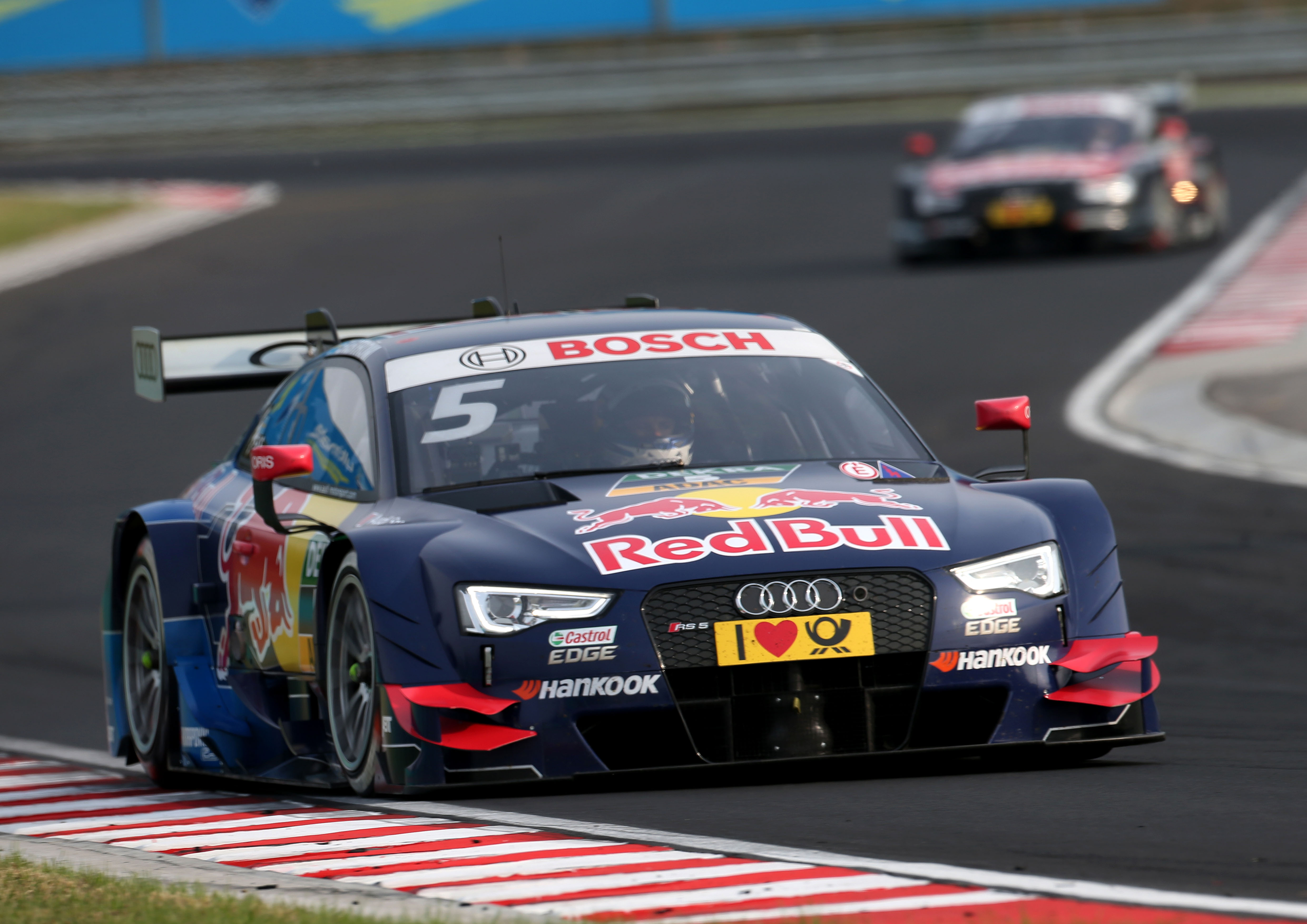
2016 RS5 DTM RC3 (Mattias Ekström)

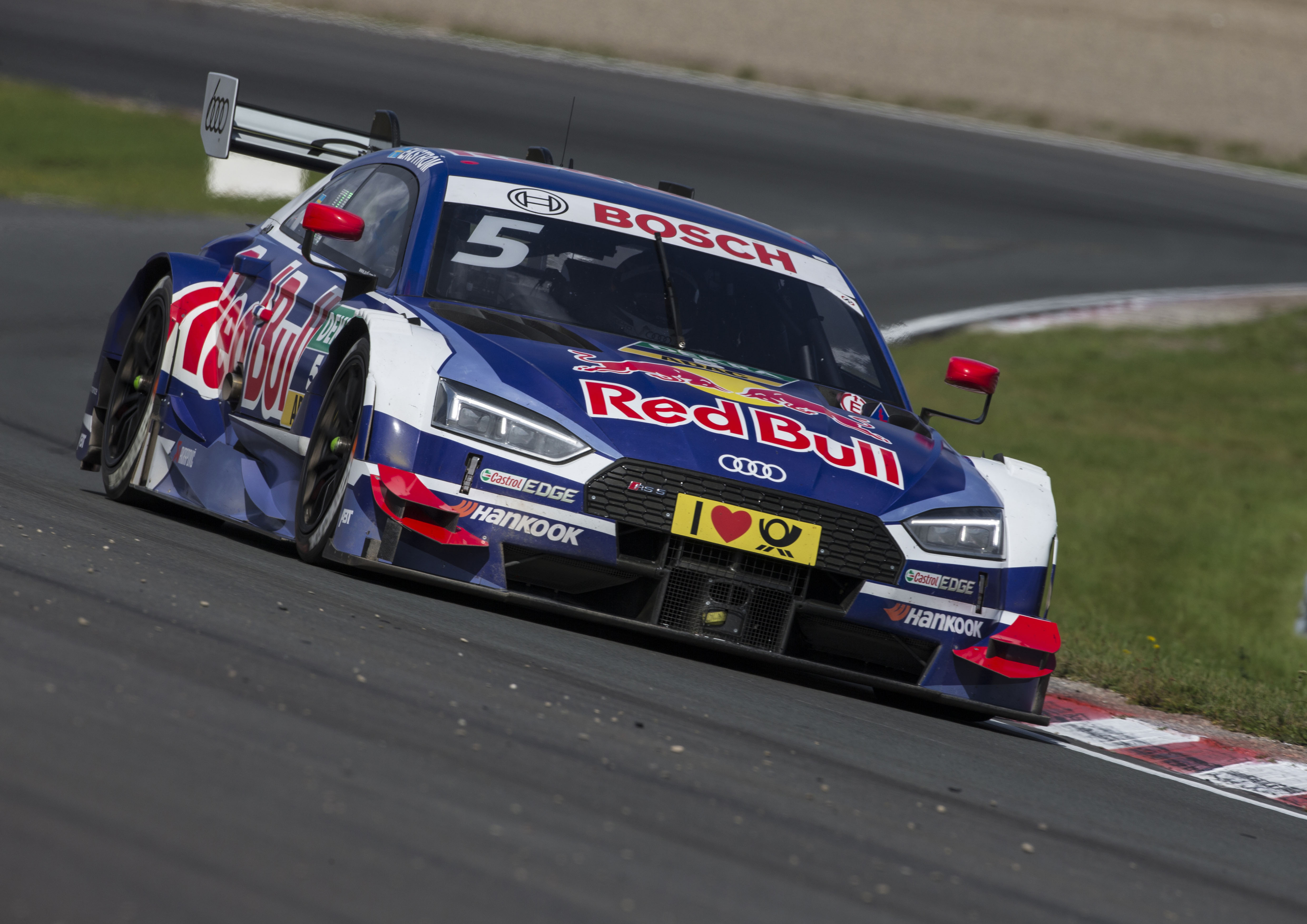
2017 RS5 DTM RC3 (Mattias Ekström)

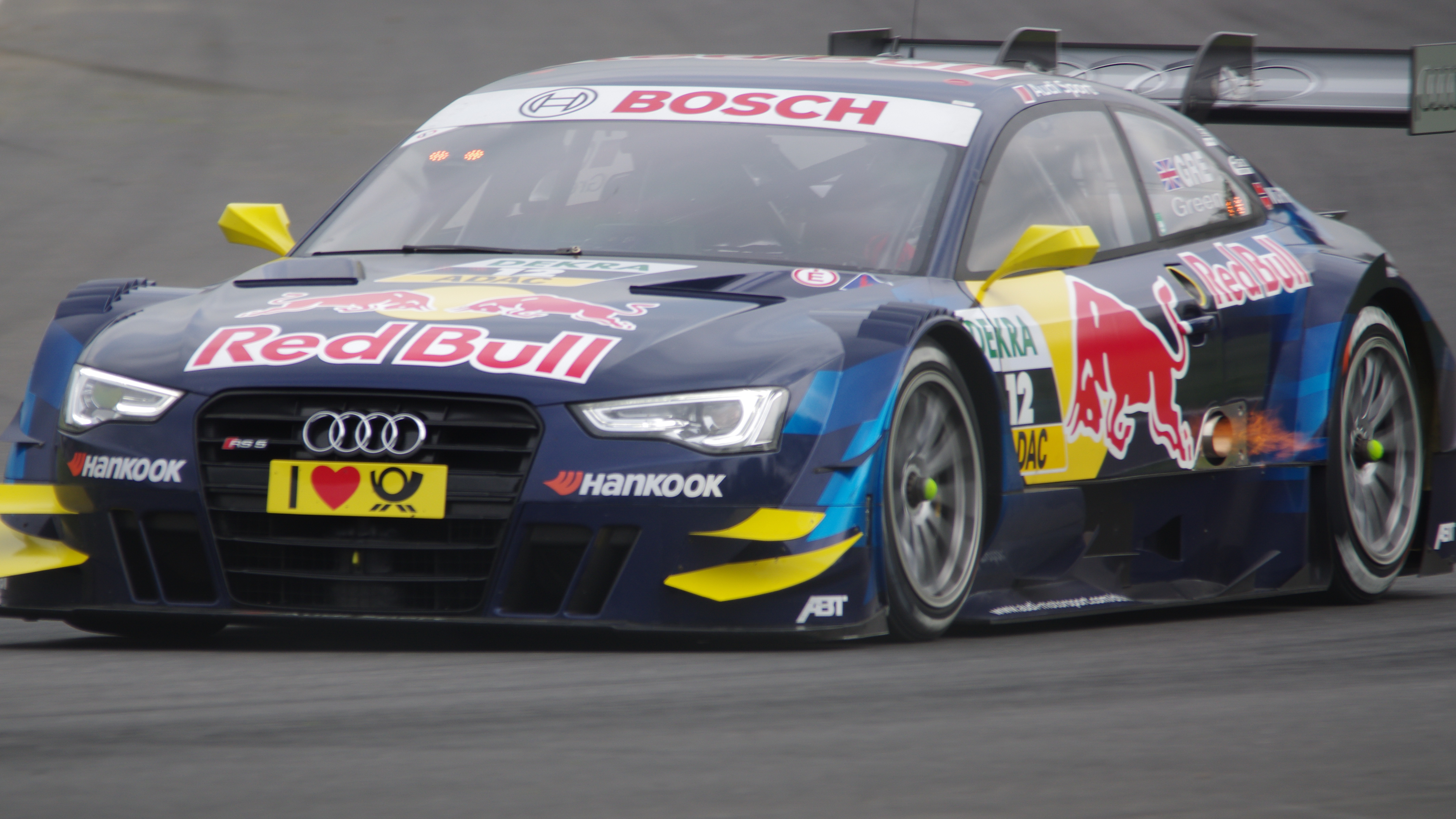
RS5 DTM R17

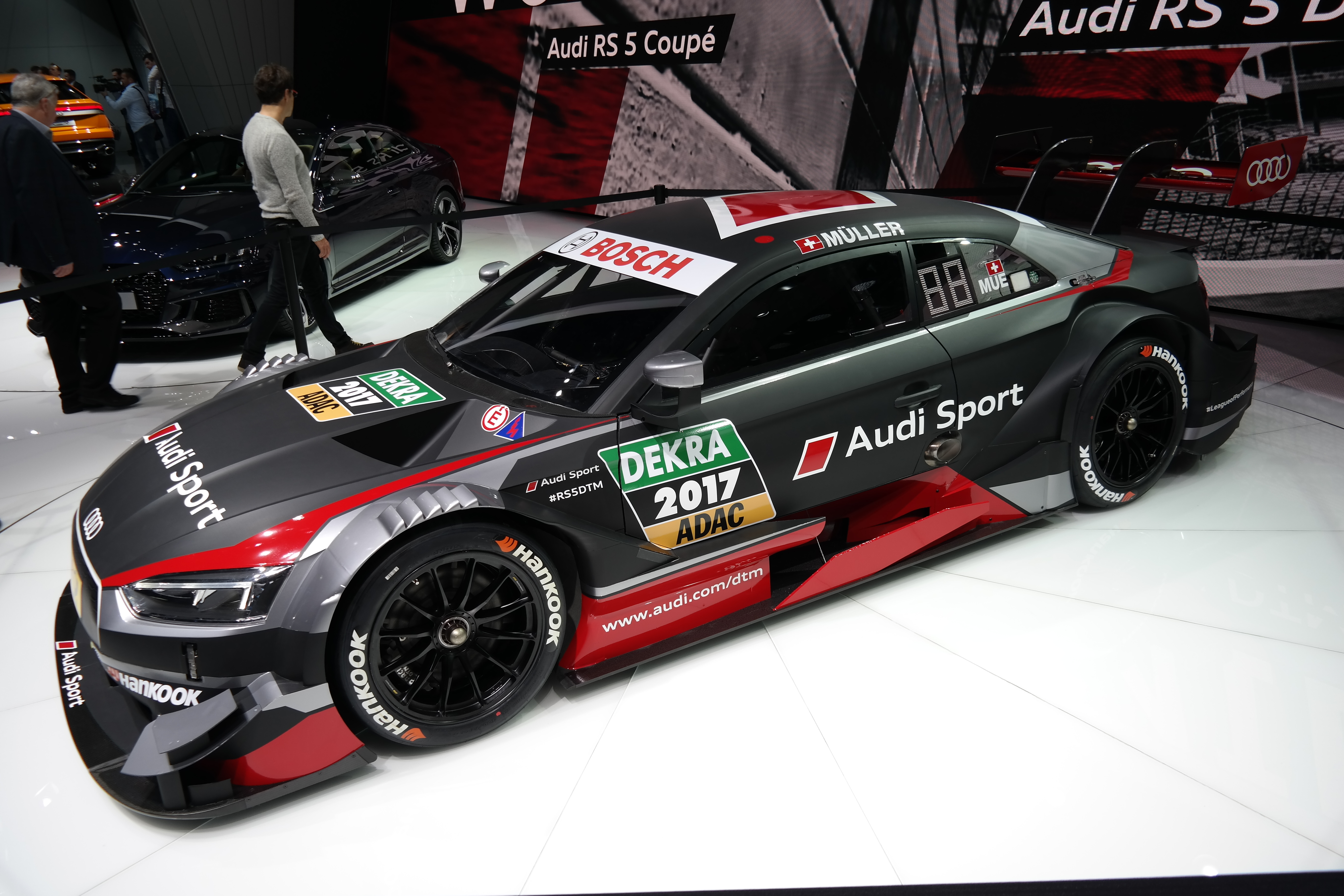
RS5 DTM RC3
