= Schlechtenberg Solarpark =

Photovoltaic power station in Germany

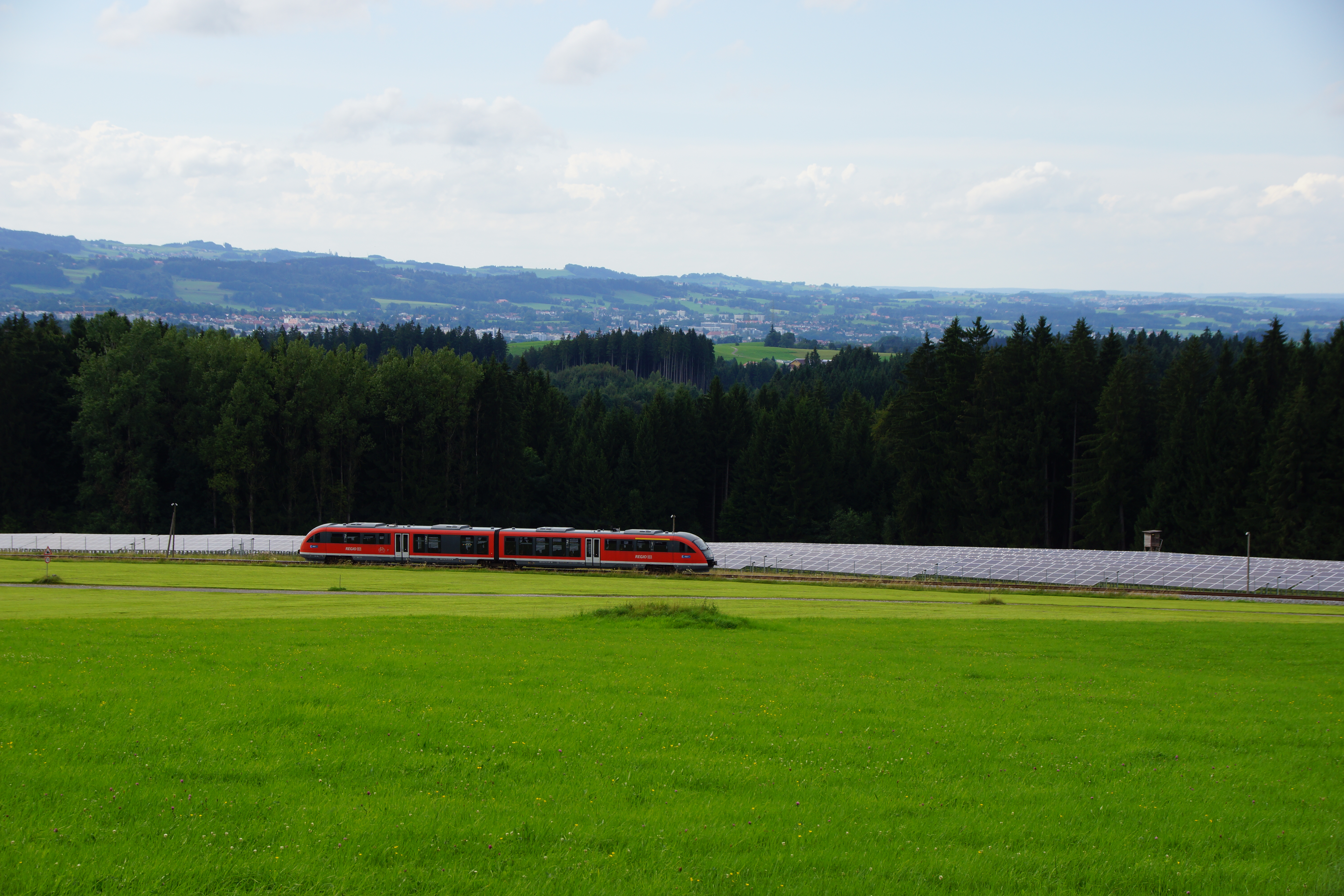
- Solarpark Schlechtenberg
- Country: Germany
- Location: Sulzberg, Oberallgäu, Bavaria
- Coordinates: 47°40′49″N 10°23′39″E
- Status: Operational
- Commission date: 2013; 13 years ago
- Operator: AIC Projects GmbH

Solar farm
- Type: Flat-panel PV

Power generation
- Units operational: 33,000
- Nameplate capacity: 8.2 MW
- Annual net output: 9.84 GWh

External links
- Commons: Related media on Commons

The Schlechtenberg Solarpark consists of 33,000 solar panels by Hanwha SolarOne, has a length of 1.2 kilometers (0.75 mi) and a width of 100 meters (330 ft). Inaugurated in September 2013, it was the largest photovoltaic power station in the Allgäu, Swabia, Germany.

== See also ==
- Photovoltaic power stations
- Solar power in Germany
