= Wolfgang Dürheimer =

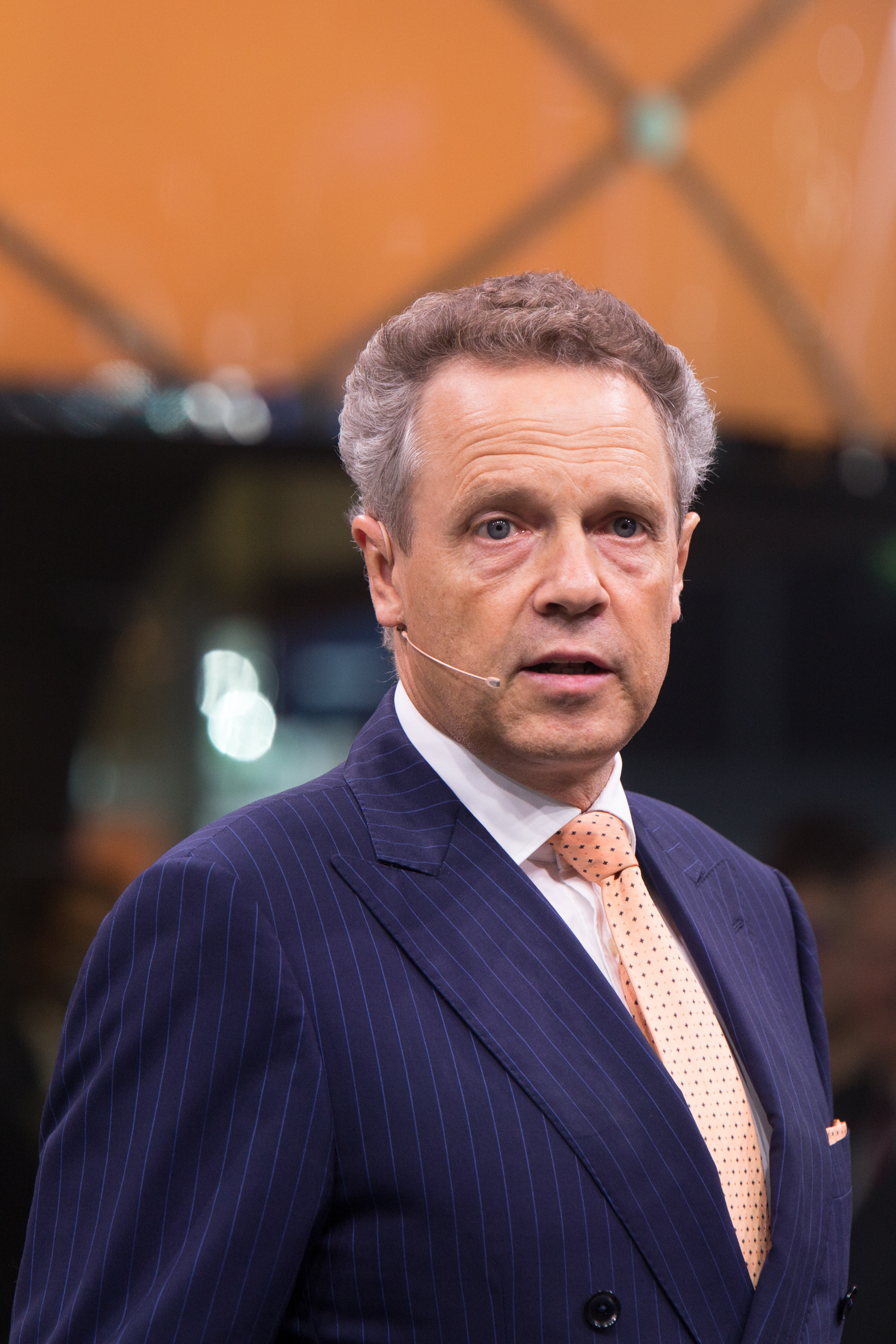
- Dürrheimer at IAA 2017
- Born: June 20, 1958 (age 68); Martinszell im Allgäu
- Education: University of Applied Sciences, Munich

Wolfgang Dürheimer (born 20 June 1958) is a German automotive business executive who, until January 2018, was the president of Bugatti Automobiles S.A.S. He was the former executive vice president of research and development at Porsche AG.

== Life ==
He was born in Martinzell in the Region of Oberallgäu on 20 June 1958.

He has a degree in Automotive Engineering and a Post Graduate degree in Engineering Business Management from the University of Applied Sciences, Munich.

== Career ==
He also has been the chairman and chief executive officer at Bentley Motors Limited and president of Bugatti Automobiles S.A.S. since June 1, 2014.

He has received a Fulbright scholarship. He also worked as the Chief executive officer and the Chairman of Bentley Motors.
