= Martinszell im Allgäu =

Village in Bavaria, Germany

Coordinates: 47°37′33″N 10°16′50″E

- Village
- Martinszell i. Allgäu
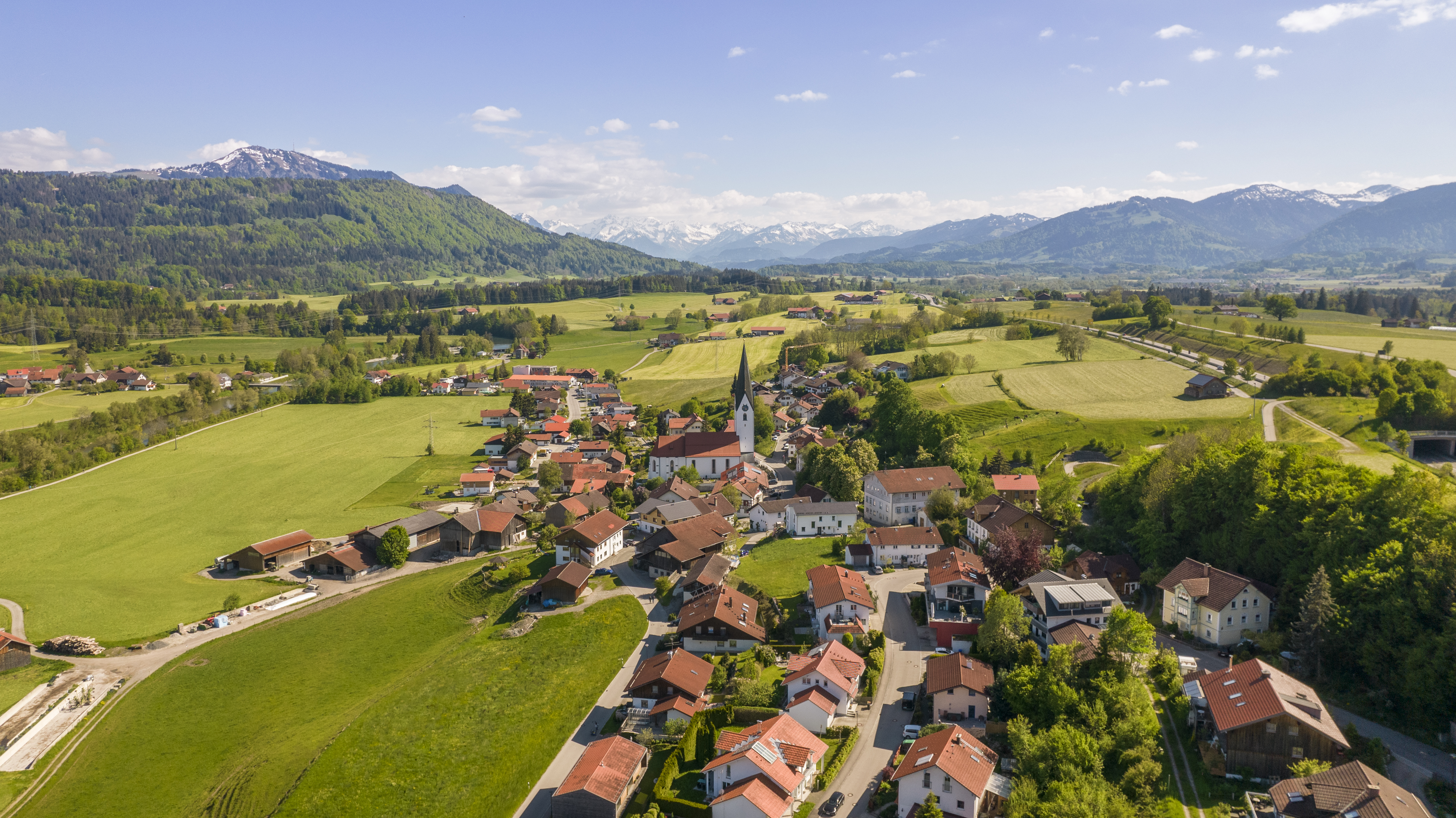
- View of Martinszell im Allgäu

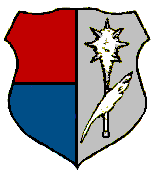
- Coat of arms

- Location in Bavaria Location in Germany
- Country: Germany
- State: Bavaria
- Administrative region: Swabia
- District: Oberallgäu
- Municipality: Waltenhofen

Population (1987)Village only.
  - Total: 258

Martinszell im Allgäu (officially Martinszell i. Allgäu) is a village in the municipality of Waltenhofen, in Oberallgäu, Swabia, Bavaria, Germany. In the Bavarian place-name database, the settlement is classified as a Pfarrdorf ("parish village"). The name is also used for one of Waltenhofen's cadastral districts (Gemarkungen).

== Geography and administrative status ==
Martinszell is one of the localities of Waltenhofen in the Oberallgäu district. Bavaria's public services portal describes Waltenhofen together with its lakeside districts of Martinszell, Memhölz and Niedersonthofen as the Niedersonthofener See recreational area.

The cadastral district of Martinszell im Allgäu remains in official administrative use. In Bavaria's official list of cadastral districts it is recorded as Gemarkung 097683, and municipal planning documents use the designation Gemarkung Martinszell im Allgäu for land in Oberdorf bei Immenstadt.

Bavarikon gives a population of 258 for the village itself in 1987. Earlier figures listed there are 307 (1970), 350 (1950), 164 (1925), and 154 (1871).

== Name ==
Historical forms recorded in the Bavarian historical place-name database include Cella sancti Martini (1237, preserved in an 18th-century copy), sant Martinszelle (1336), and Martinszell i. Allgäu (1973).

== History ==
Martinszell is associated with the German Peasants' War through the Martinszeller Vertrag (Martinszell Treaty), concluded on 23 October 1525 between the abbot of Kempten and representatives of the court district of Martinszell. The Baden-Württemberg state history portal LEO-BW notes that parts of the later Memmingen treaty were based on this agreement.

The reformer Matthias Waibel was born in Martinszell at the end of the 15th century.

== Landmarks ==
The Catholic church of St. Martin is the principal church of the village. The municipality of Waltenhofen describes it as a Baroque/Neo-Gothic village church associated with Prince-Abbot Honorius Roth von Schreckenstein.

== See also ==
- Waltenhofen
