= Sulzburg Jewish Cemetery =

Jewish cemetery in Sulzburg, Baden-Württemberg, Germany

- Jüdischer Friedhof Sulzburg
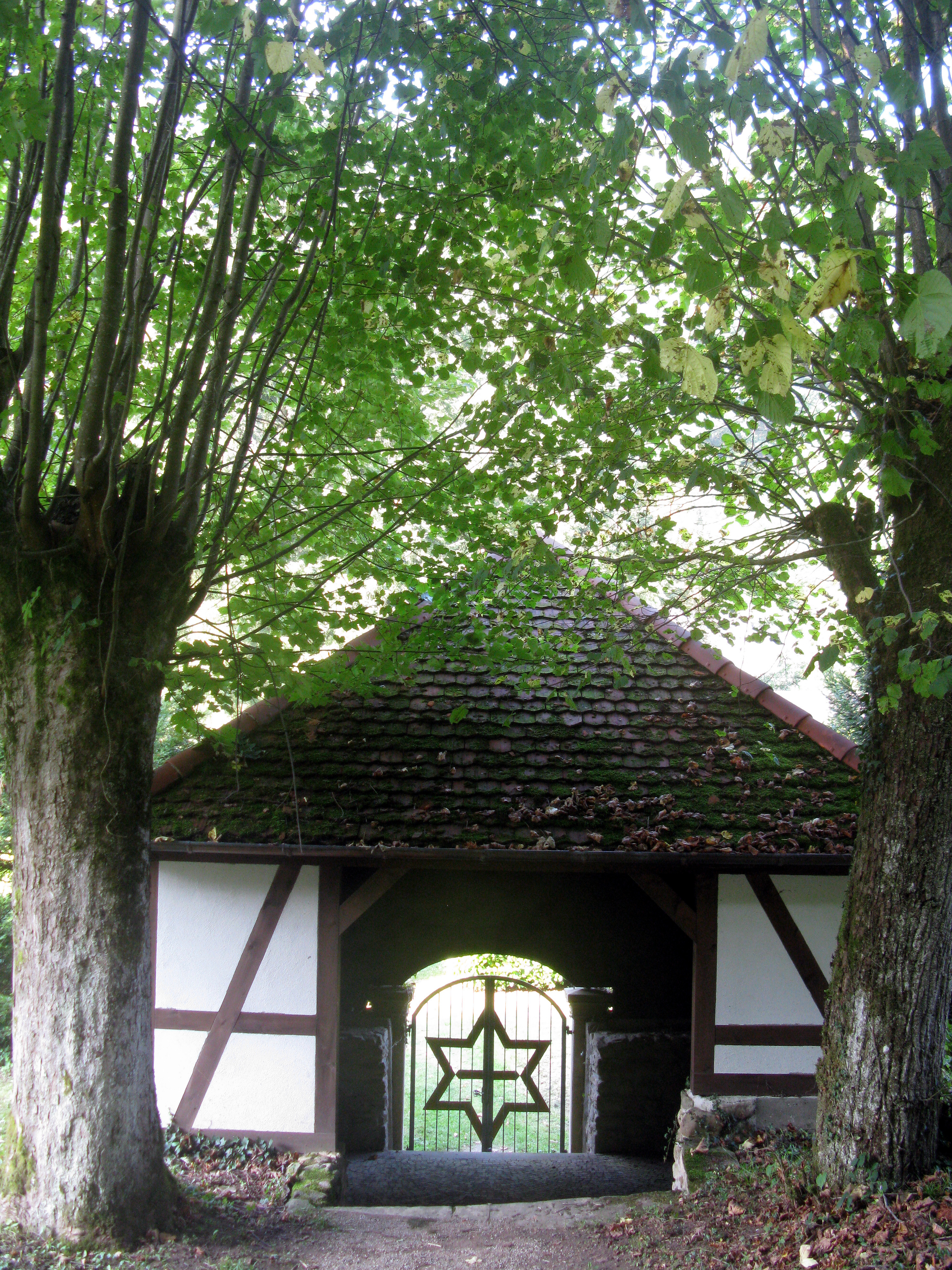
- The entry door of the cemetery
- Interactive map of Sulzburg Jewish Cemetery

Details
- Established: mid-16th century
- Location: Sulzburg, Breisgau-Hochschwarzwald, Baden-Württemberg
- Country: Germany
- Coordinates: 47°50′08″N 7°43′23″E
- Type: Jewish cemetery
- No. of graves: 462

Sulzburg Jewish Cemetery (German: jüdischer Friedhof Sulzburg) is a Jewish burial place located in Sulzburg, Baden-Württemberg, Germany. It is listed as a heritage site.

== Location ==
The Jewish cemetery is located on Badstraße in Berholz Forest. It spreads over 61.48 ares.

== History ==
The cemetery was probably built in the mid-16th century. Jews from Sulzburg and neighbouring locations were buried there until a collective Jewish cemetery was opened in Lörrach in 1670. During several decades, no grave was added and the cemetery fell into ruin.

In 1717, the cemetery recovered its initial role. The small room was built at this time. The cemetery has 462 graves, the oldest datable one being from 1737. Evidence of desecration can be seen in the modern part of the cemetery.

In 1970, a monument was erected to commemorate the victims of the persecution of Jews in the Third Reich.

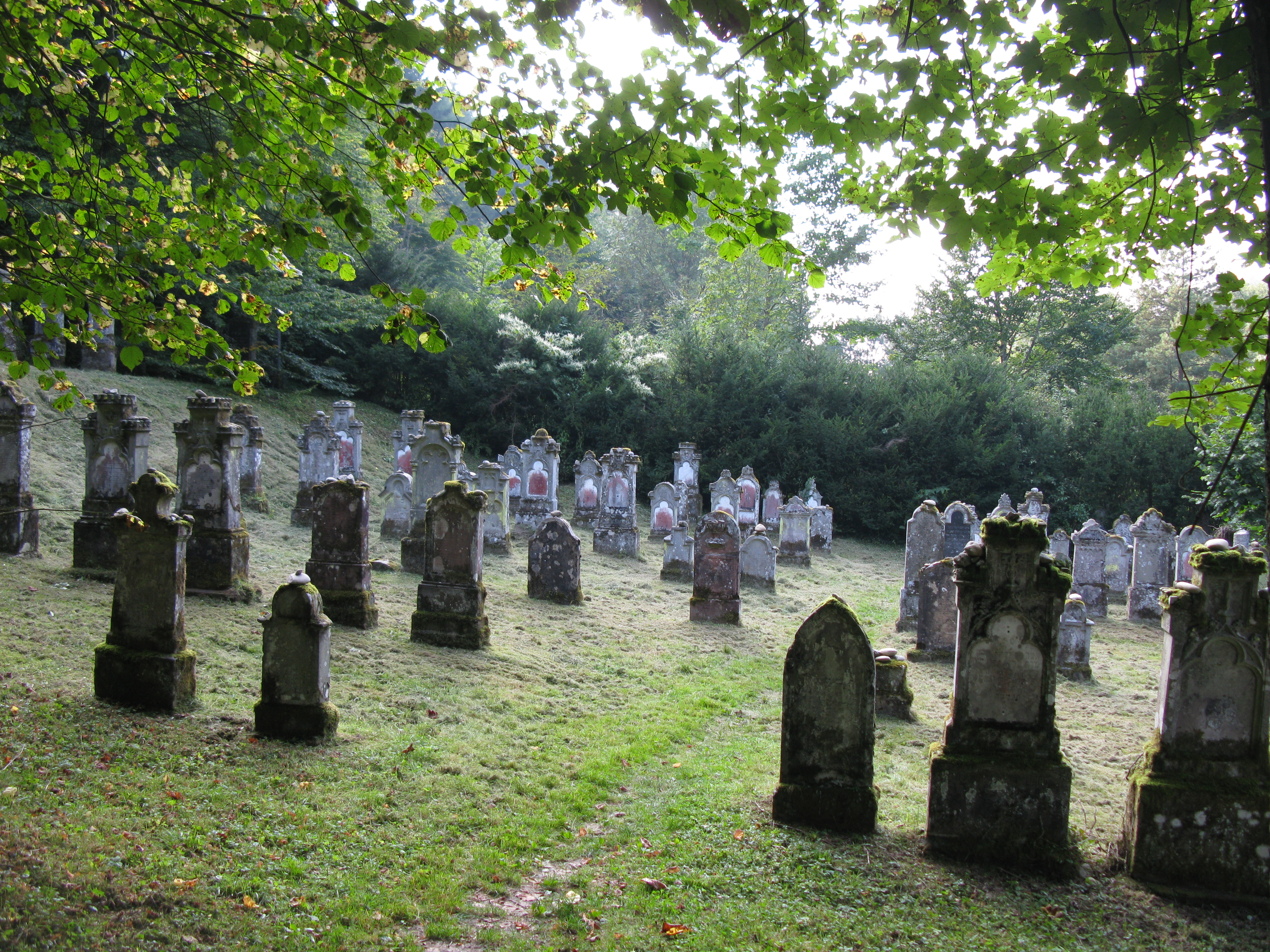
Graves in the cemetery.
