= Sulzburg =

- Town
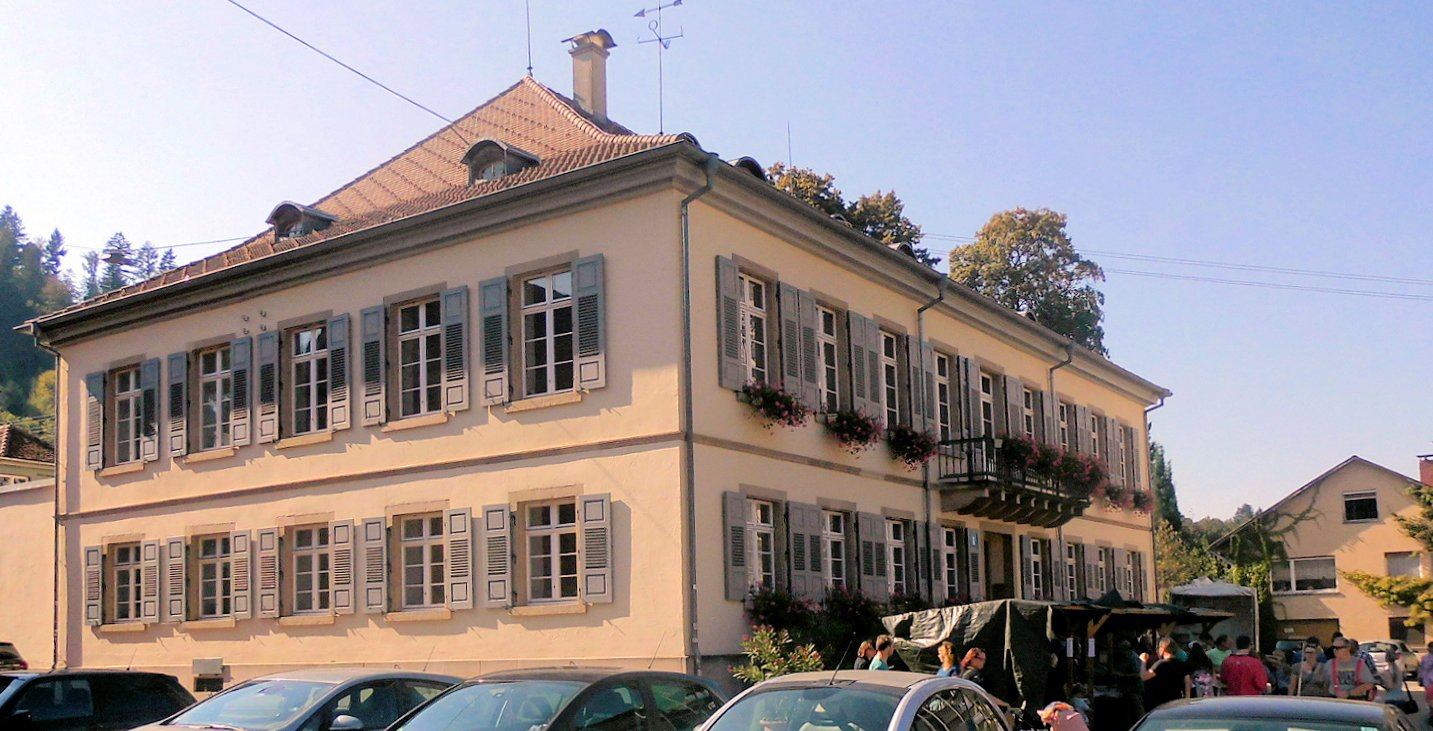
- Town hall

- Coat of arms

- Location of Sulzburg within Breisgau-Hochschwarzwald district
- Interactive map of Sulzburg
- Location within Germany Location within Baden-Württemberg
- Coordinates: 47°50′25″N 7°42′33″E
- Country: Germany
- State: Baden-Württemberg
- Admin. region: Freiburg
- District: Breisgau-Hochschwarzwald

Government
  - Mayor (2021–29): Dirk Blens (CDU)

Area
  - Total: 22.74 km^{2} (8.78 sq mi)
- Elevation: 337 m (1,106 ft)

Population (2025-12-31)
  - Total: 2,766
  - Density: 121.6/km^{2} (315.0/sq mi)
- Time zone: UTC+01:00 (CET)
  - Summer (DST): UTC+02:00 (CEST)
- Postal codes: 79295
- Dialling codes: 07634
- Vehicle registration: FR
- Website: www.sulzburg.de

Sulzburg (German pronunciation: [ˈzʊltsbʊʁk]) is a town in the district Breisgau-Hochschwarzwald, in Baden-Württemberg, Germany. It is situated on the western slope of the Black Forest, 20 km southwest of Freiburg.

Sulzburg had a long tradition of continuous Jewish settlement since medieval times. Around 1850, almost one third of its population of around 1,200 was Jewish. Sulzburg's lovely, barrel-vaulted synagogue has been completely restored. There exists an old Jewish cemetery near the town.

== Notable people ==
- Frederick V, Margrave of Baden-Durlach (1594–1659), Markgraf of Baden-Durlach, 1622 to 1659
- Johann Daniel Schöpflin (1694–1771), professor of history, eloquence and the theory of law at the University of Strasbourg
- Gustav Weil (1808–1889), first orientalist, first Jewish professor in Germany.
- Herman Kiefer (1825–1911), a physician, politician and US diplomat.
- Ernst Leitz (1843-1920) founded the Ernst Leitz Optical Works in Wetzlar; father of Ernst Leitz II
- Erich Bloch (1925–2016), computer scientist and engineer, director of the US National Science Foundation

== See also ==
- Sulzberg
