= Hannelore Siegel =

German politician

Member of the Bavarian Senate
- In office 1 January 1996 – 31 December 1999

Personal details
- Born: Hannelore Siegel; 5 August 1941 Durach, Bavaria, Germany
- Died: 26 November 2016 (aged 75) Durach, Bavaria, Germany
- Occupation: Farmer; politician
- Awards: Order of Merit of the Federal Republic of Germany (2002); Bavarian Order of Merit (2005)

Hannelore Siegel (5 August 1941 - 26 November 2016) was a German farmer and politician who served in the Bavarian Senate from 1996 to 1999. She also served in several positions in the Bayerischer Bauernverband, including state chair (1995-2002).

== Biography ==
Hannelore Suppmayr was born on 5 August 1941 in the Miesenbach village in Durach, Bavaria, and she was educated at a Durach primary school and the Kempten Agricultural and Domestic Science School. After working at her parents' farm, she married into the Siegel family farm in Durach in 1964.

Siegel served in several positions in the Bayerischer Bauernverband: local chair for Durach (1971 to 1991), district chair for Oberallgäu (1987-1997), regional chair for Swabia (1992-2002), and state chair (1995-2002). She was also a member of the national board of the German Rural Women's Association and, from 1999 to 2002, served as their second vice president. The BBV awarded her the title of honorary state farmer.

From 1984 to 1996, Siegel served on the Durach municipal council as a representative of independent voters. On 1 January 1996, she began serving in the Bavarian Senate, serving until 31 December 1999. She served on Committee on Social, Health and Family Policy and on the Bavarian State Senior Citizens' Council. In 1999, she was nominated by the Christian Social Union in Bavaria for the 11th Federal Convention.

Siegel was awarded the Order of Merit of the Federal Republic of Germany in 2002 and the Bavarian Order of Merit in 2005. The Bayerisches Landwirtschaftliches Wochenblatt reported that she "championed the interests of Bavarian rural women with dedication and expertise".

Siegel died on 26 November 2016 in Durach.
