= Sulzberg (Mangfall Mountains) =

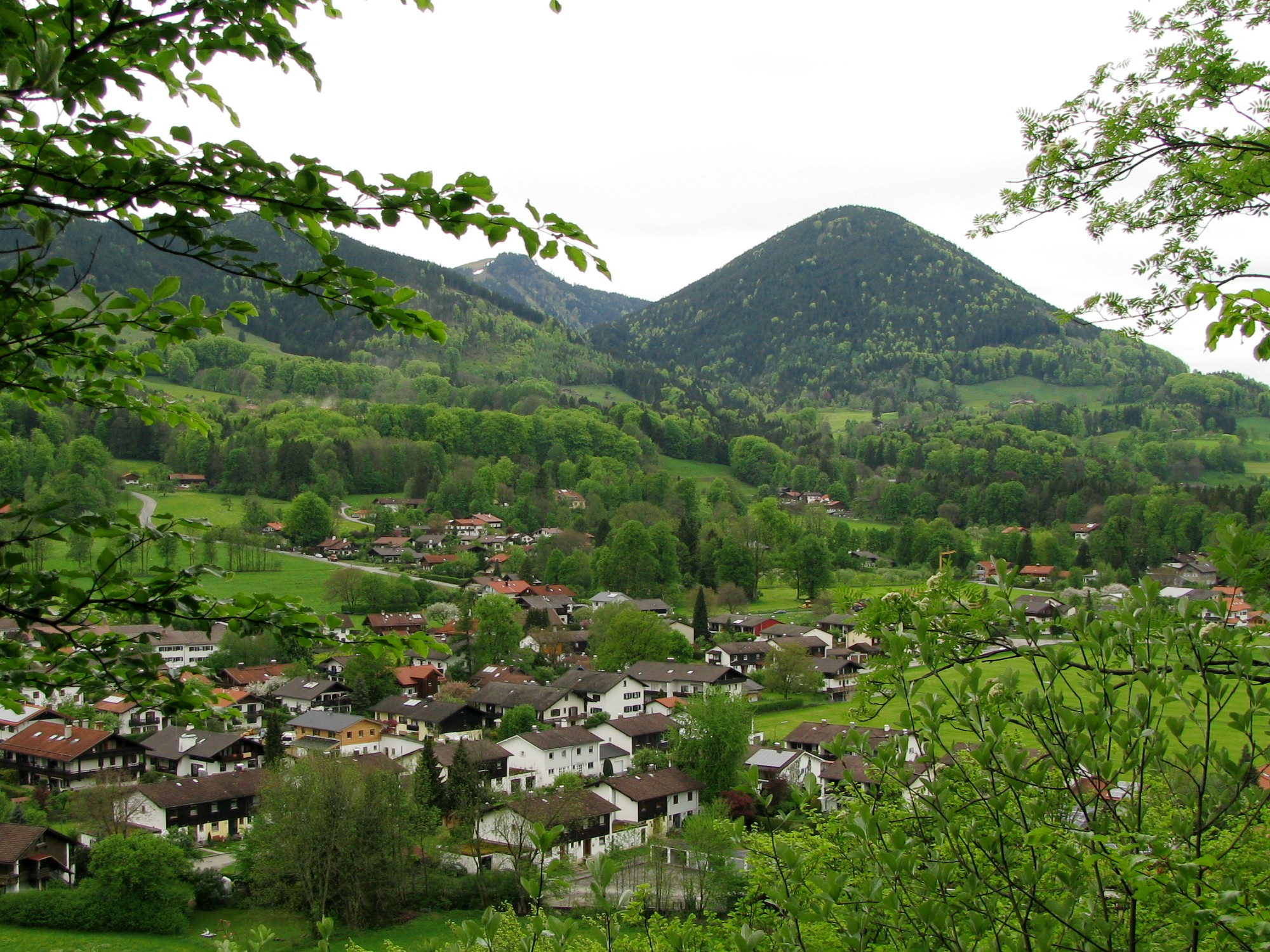
- Sulzberg aus südöstlicher Richtung

Highest point
- Elevation: 1,117 m (3,665 ft)
- Coordinates: 47°44′41″N 12°03′43″E

Geography
- Location within Bavaria
- Location: Landkreis Rosenheim, Bavaria, Germany
- Parent range: Bavarian Prealps

The Sulzberg (German pronunciation: [ˈzʊltsbɛʁk]) is a mountain in the Bavarian Alps. It is located between Litzldorf, Großholzhausen and Brannenburg, south of Rosenheim, Bavaria in Germany.
