= Durach =

- Municipality
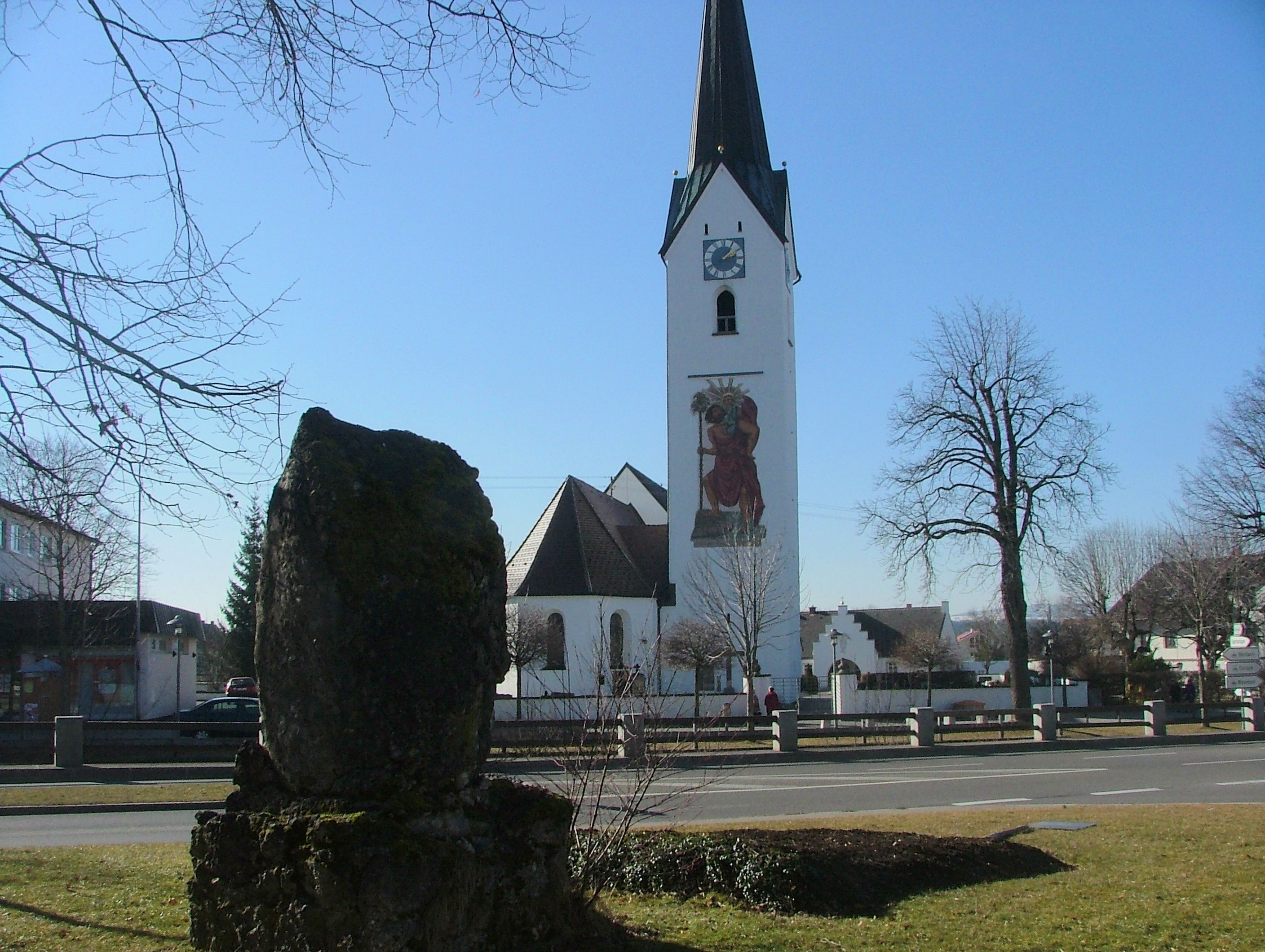
- Heilig Geist church (Holy Spirit church)

- Coat of arms

- Location of Durach within Oberallgäu district
- Interactive map of Durach
- Location within Germany Location within Bavaria
- Coordinates: 47°42′N 10°20′E
- Country: Germany
- State: Bavaria
- Admin. region: Schwaben
- District: Oberallgäu

Government
  - Mayor (2020–26): Gerhard Hock

Area
  - Total: 20.72 km^{2} (8.00 sq mi)
- Elevation: 714 m (2,343 ft)

Population (2025-12-31)
  - Total: 6,924
  - Density: 334.2/km^{2} (865.5/sq mi)
- Time zone: UTC+01:00 (CET)
  - Summer (DST): UTC+02:00 (CEST)
- Postal codes: 87471
- Dialling codes: 0831
- Vehicle registration: OA
- Website: www.durach-allgaeu.de

Durach (German pronunciation: [ˈduːʁax]) is a municipality in the district of Oberallgäu in Bavaria in Germany.

The village came into international media attention in August 2008 when a light aircraft hit power lines in its vicinity and the pilot and passenger, who had survived inside the plane dangling on high-tension power cables, were rescued in front of cameras.

== Notable people ==
- Hannelore Siegel (1941-2016), member of the Bavarian Senate.
