= Sulzberg, Oberallgäu =

Sulzberg
- Municipality
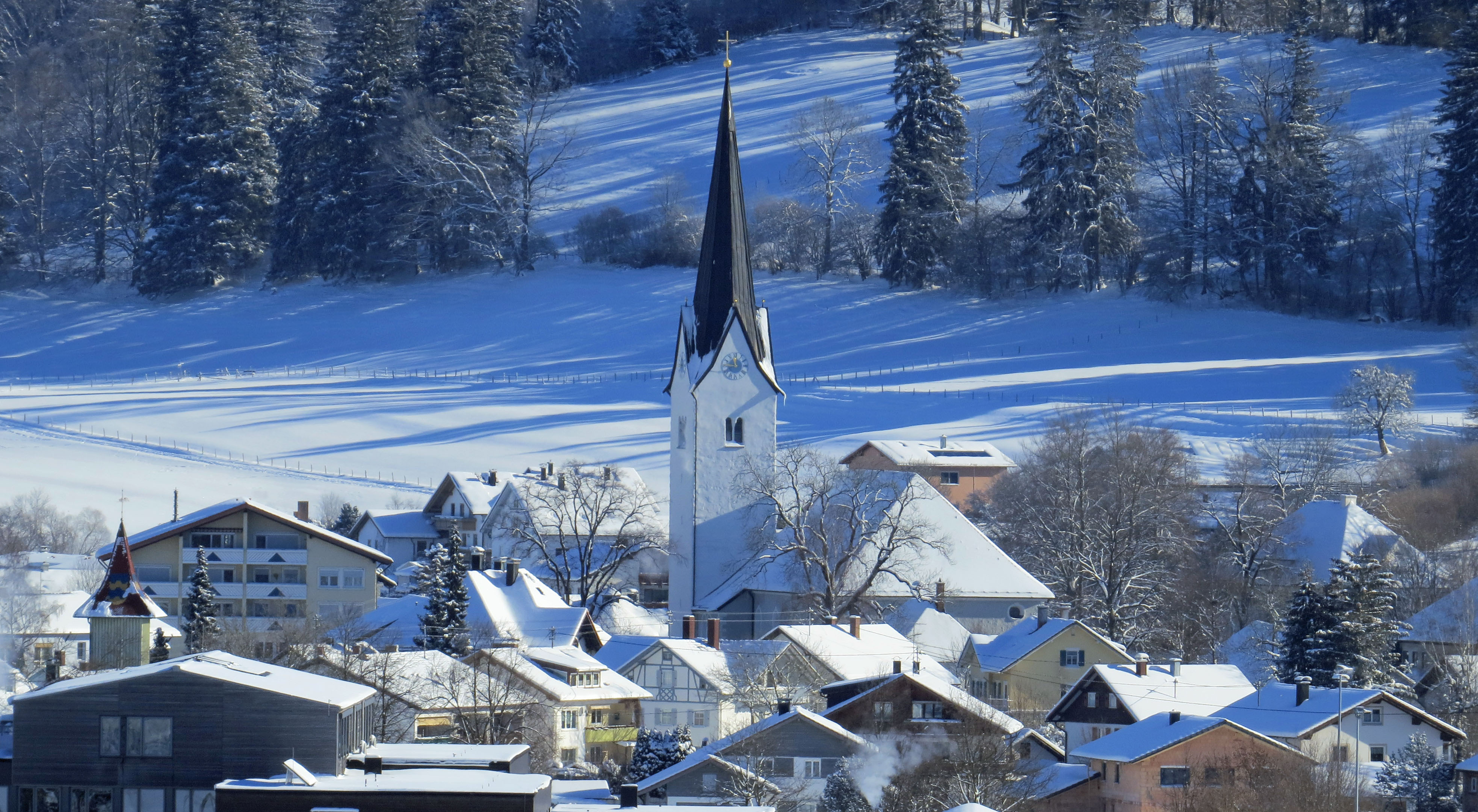
- Sulzberg seen from the west

- Flag Coat of arms

- Location of Sulzberg within Oberallgäu district
- Interactive map of Sulzberg
- Location within Germany Location within Bavaria
- Coordinates: 47°40′N 10°21′E
- Country: Germany
- State: Bavaria
- Admin. region: Schwaben
- District: Oberallgäu

Government
  - Mayor (2020–26): Gerhard Frey

Area
  - Total: 40.99 km^{2} (15.83 sq mi)
- Elevation: 700–990 m (2,300–3,250 ft)

Population (2025-12-31)
  - Total: 5,059
  - Density: 123.4/km^{2} (319.7/sq mi)
- Time zone: UTC+01:00 (CET)
  - Summer (DST): UTC+02:00 (CEST)
- Postal codes: 87477
- Dialling codes: 08376
- Vehicle registration: OA
- Website: www.sulzberg.de

Sulzberg (German pronunciation: [ˈzʊltsbɛʁk]) is a municipality in the district of Oberallgäu in Bavaria in Germany.
