= Bentley Continental GT =

Grand touring car manufactured since 2003

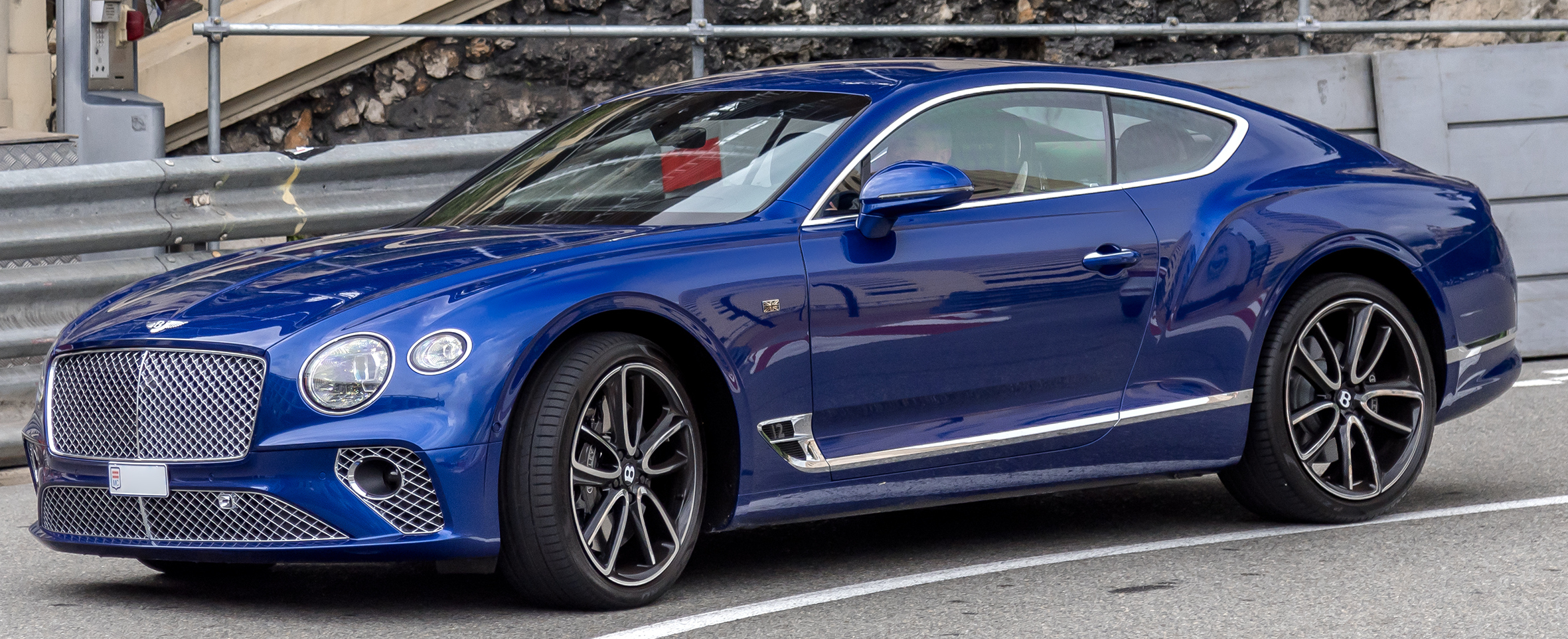

Overview
- Manufacturer: Bentley
- Production: 2003–present
- Assembly: United Kingdom: Crewe (Bentley Crewe)

Body and chassis
- Class: Grand tourer (S)
- Body style: 2-door fastback coupé 2-door convertible
- Layout: F4 layout FR layout (2025–present Supersports)

The Bentley Continental GT is a grand touring car manufactured and marketed by the British company Bentley Motors since 2003. The Continental GT is offered as a two-door coupé or convertible, with four seats. It was the first new Bentley released after the company's acquisition by Volkswagen AG in 1998, and the first Bentley to employ mass production manufacturing techniques. It was later joined by the Bentley Continental Flying Spur, a four-door saloon car variant.

== Origin ==
In 1994, Rolls-Royce Motors who at that time owned the Bentley brand, previewed a convertible concept car at the Geneva Motor Show – the Concept Java. The car was designed to be a smaller, more affordable Bentley, yet still exclusive in order to maintain the integrity of the brand. It was to appeal to a new range of potential buyers and generate increase sales volume for Rolls-Royce. At the time the current Bentley Continental R was an ultra-exclusive £180,000 in the UK, within reach of a very select market, selling only 200–300 units a year. The Concept Java never went into production in the form seen in 1994, although 13 cars were made for the Sultan of Brunei. However, the Bentley Continental GT realised the concept of the Java as a more affordable Bentley, manufactured in much larger volumes.

== First generation (2003–2011) ==
First generation
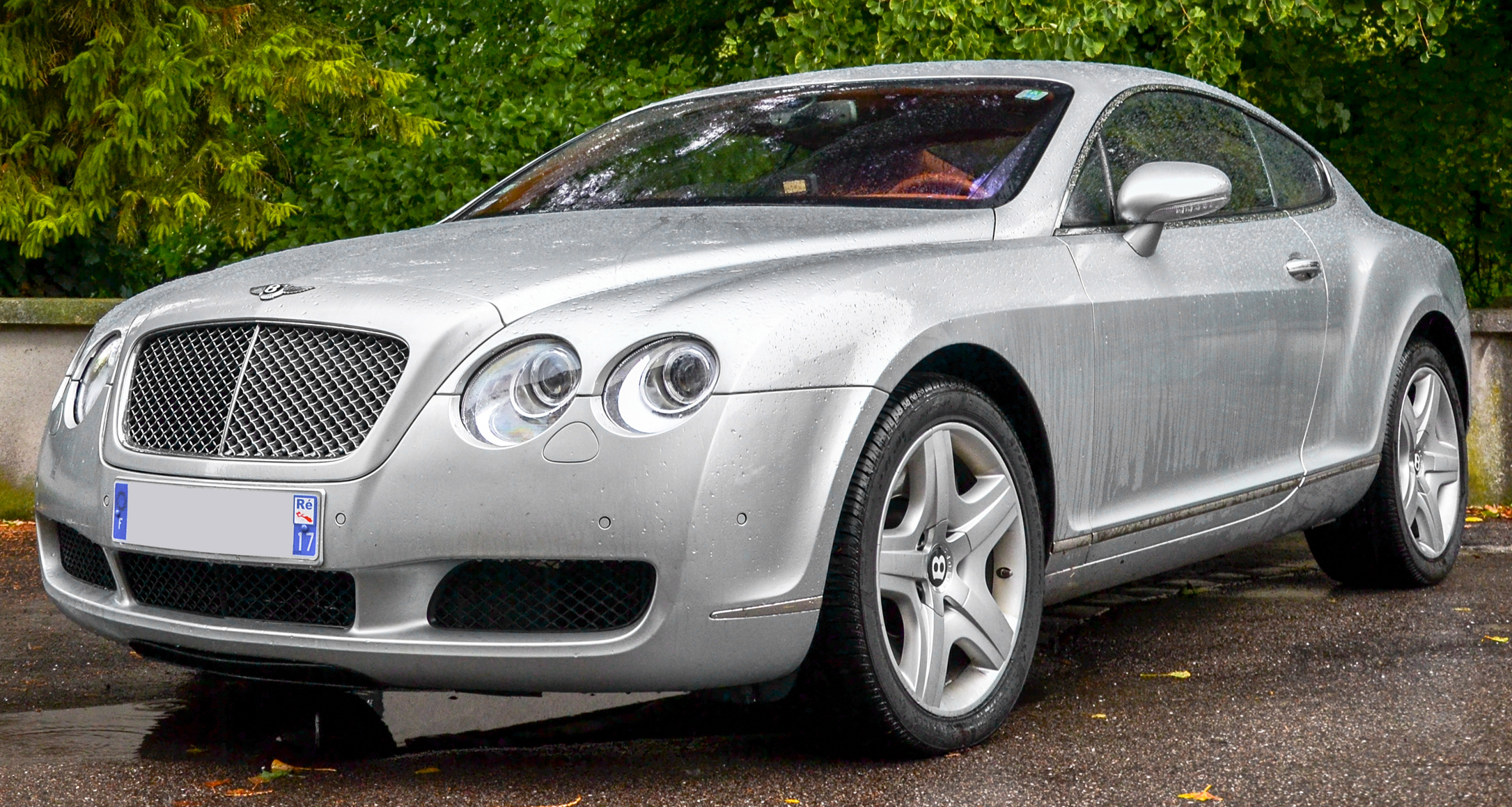

Overview
- Production: March 2003–2011
- Designer: Raul Pires, Dirk van Braeckel (2000)

Body and chassis
- Platform: Volkswagen Group D1
- Related: Bentley Flying Spur; Volkswagen Phaeton

Powertrain
- Engine: 6.0 L W12 twin-turbo
- Transmission: 6-speed ZF 6HP 26A tiptronic automatic

Dimensions
- Wheelbase: 2,746 mm (108.1 in)
- Length: 4,808 mm (189.3 in): 2003–2005; 4,804 mm (189.1 in): 2006–2011
- Width: 1,918 mm (75.5 in): 2003–2005 & GTC; 1,946 mm (76.6 in): Supersports; 75.4 in (1,915 mm): 2009–2011 Coupe; 77.4 in (1,966 mm): 2009–2011 Convertible
- Height: 1,390 mm (54.7 in); 1,380 mm (54.3 in): Speed; 1,398 mm (55.0 in): GTC
- Kerb weight: 2,350 kg (5,181 lb); 2,485 kg (5,478 lb): GTC

=== Continental GT (2003–2011) ===
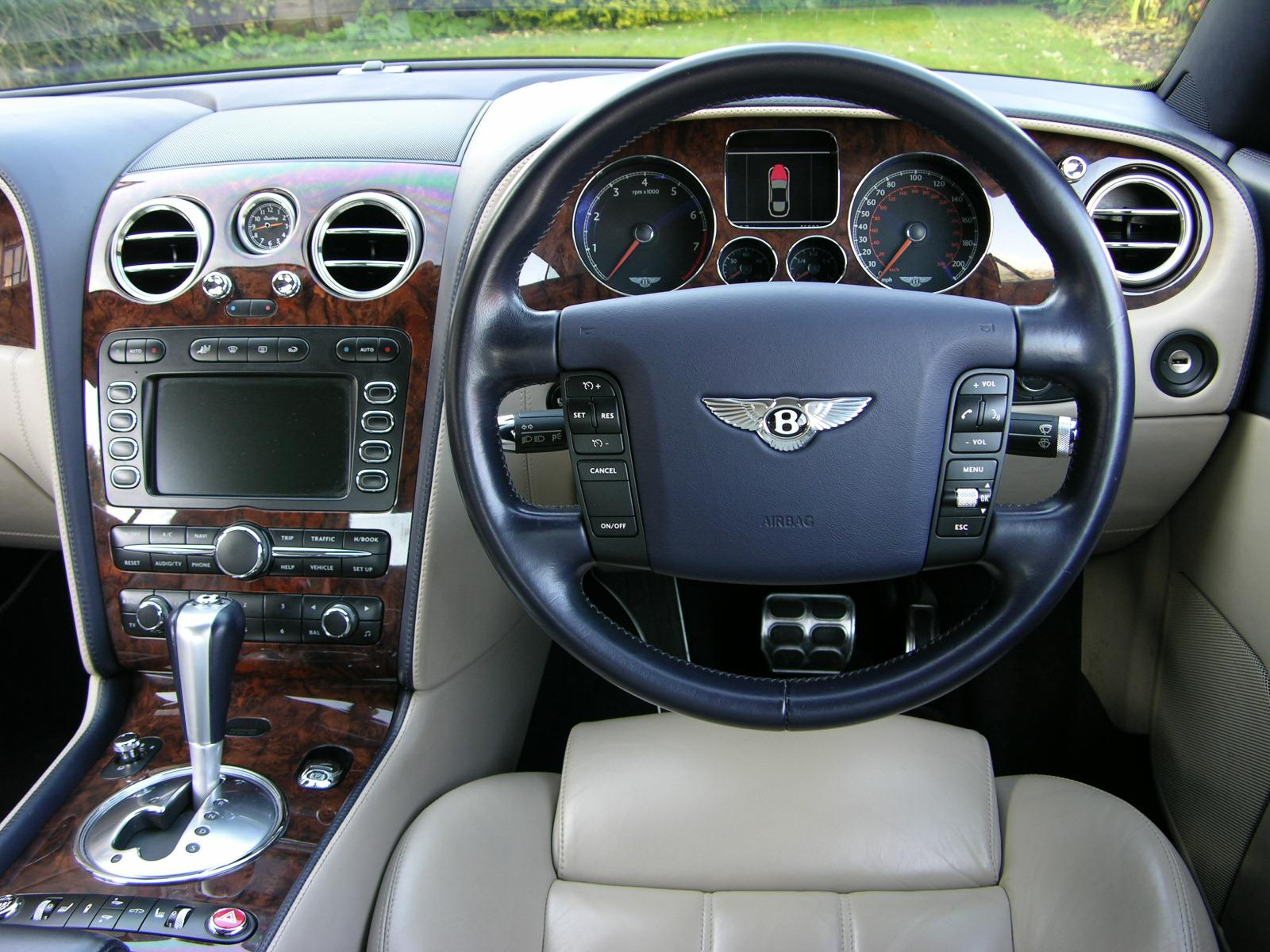
Bentley Continental GT interior

The vehicle debuted in 2002 at the Paris Motor Show, followed by Le Mans, the 2003 Goodwood Festival of Speed and the 2003 annual Bentley Drivers Club meeting at Silverstone. The car differed from the previous Continental R & T models in terms of its concept: although much of the car is hand assembled, it is a mass-produced car made in significantly larger numbers. It is not a coach-built car. The price at launch was less than half the price of the Continental R, giving the car a wider customer base.

The Continental GT is equipped with a 6.0 litre twin-turbocharged W12 engine, which produces a DIN-rated power output of 560 PS (412 kW; 552 bhp) at 6,100 rpm, and torque of 650 N⋅m (479 lbf⋅ft) at 1,600–6,100 rpm. A Torsen-based permanent four-wheel drive is standard. It can accelerate from 0 to 100 km/h (0.0 to 62.1 mph) in 4.8 seconds, and go on to reach a top speed of 318 km/h (197.6 mph).

The Continental GT coupe features fixed front quarter glass, but no B pillar between the front and rear side windows, a design which has been carried on through all subsequent generations of the car.

Early models include a choice of 6 body colours (Diamond Black, Burnt Oak, Cypress, Neptune, Spruce, and Umbrian Red), 8 hide colours (Beluga, Burnt Oak, Laurel, Nautic, Portland, Saffron, Savannah, Saddle), 5 veneer types (Burr Oak, Burr Walnut, Dark Stained Walnut, Madrona, Piano Black) and 4 carpet and seatbelt colours (Beluga, Burnt Oak, Laurel, Nautic). The dashboard clock was made by Swiss luxury watchmaker Breitling, which Bentley commissioned in 2002.

American musician Prince owned a 2006 Continental GT Coupe in Baby Blue. Upon his death, in April 2016, the car was placed on permanent display in the sound stage at his famous Paisley Park complex in Chanhassen, Minnesota.

=== 2005 model year update, Mulliner Driving Specification (2004–2011) ===
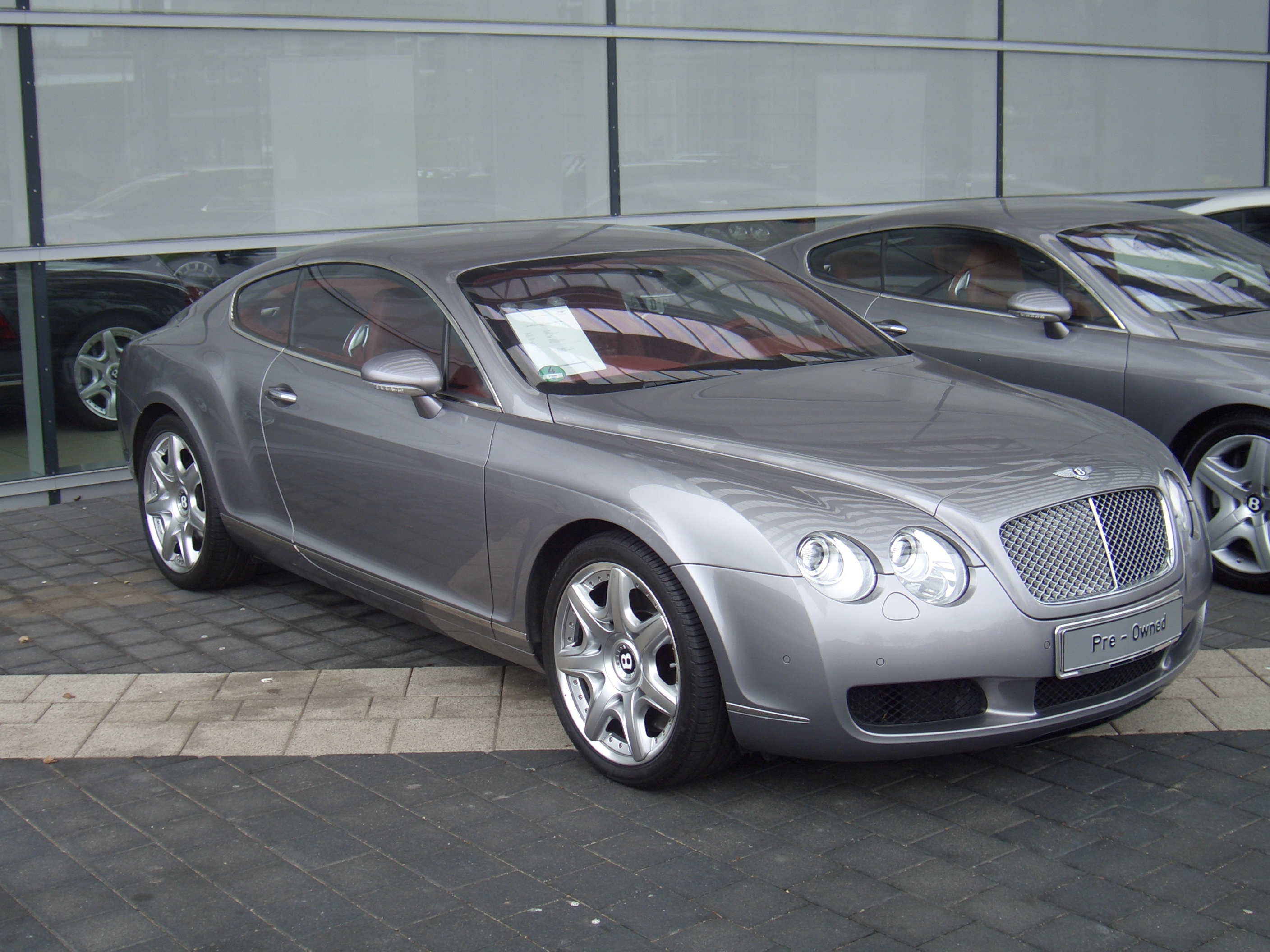
Bentley Continental GT Mulliner Driving Specification

Changes to the Bentley Continental GT for 2005 include voice activation for the in-car telephone in six languages and increased interior trim options with the addition of magnolia hide, as well as carpets and seat belts that can be matched to either the main or secondary hide colour.

The Mulliner Driving Specification includes 20-inch 2-piece 7-spoke alloy sports wheels with bespoke Yokohama Advan Sport 275/35 R20 tyres, drilled alloy sports foot pedals and footrest, a gear lever finished in knurled chrome and hide, two-tone leather and veneer combinations, diamond quilted hide to facings, doors and rear quarter panels; embroidered 'Bentley' marque emblem to seat facings, indented hide headlining and dark-stained burr walnut or piano black veneer.

The vehicles went on sale in October 2004.

=== Continental GTC (2006–2011) ===
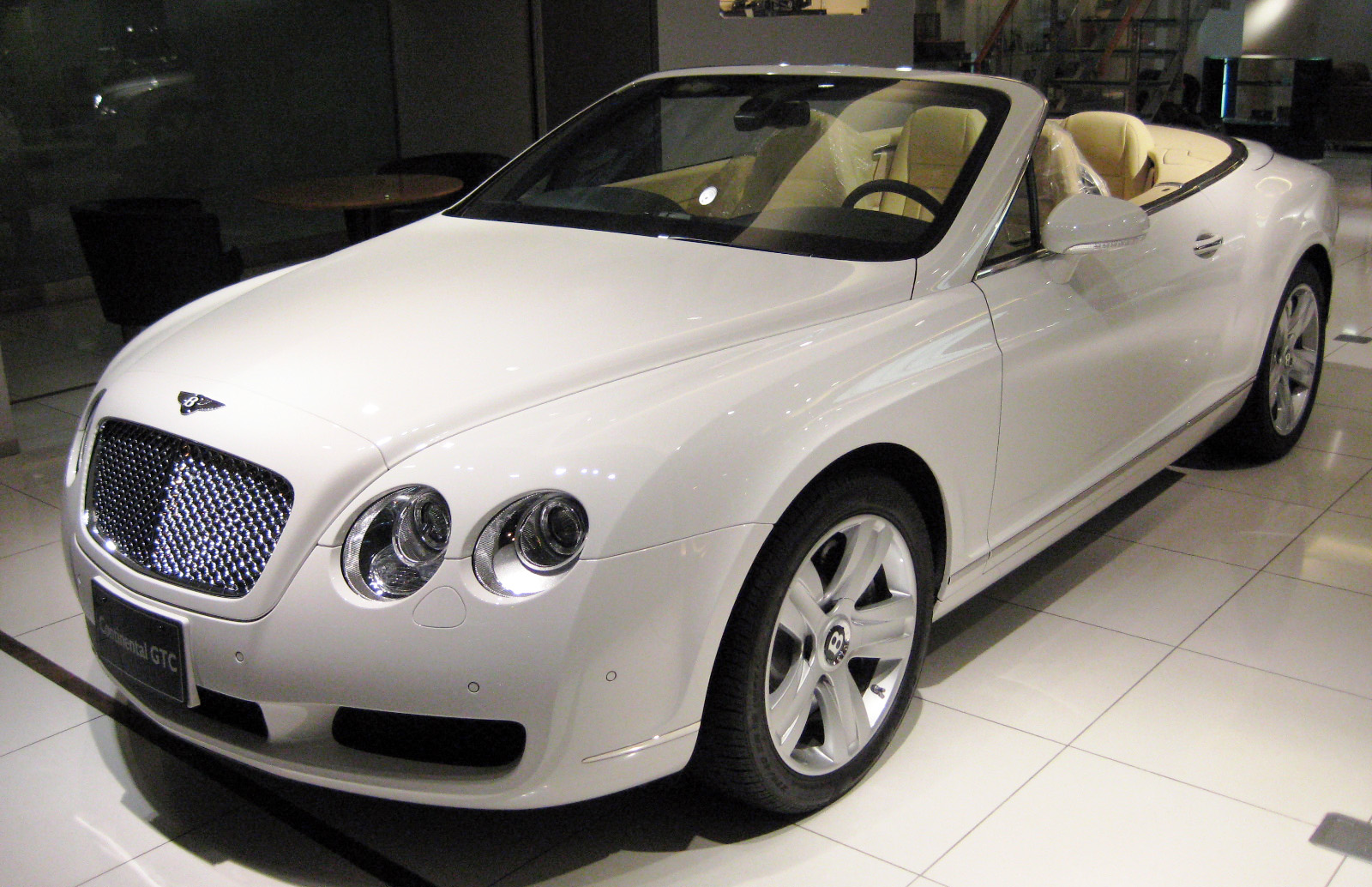
Bentley Continental GTC front view

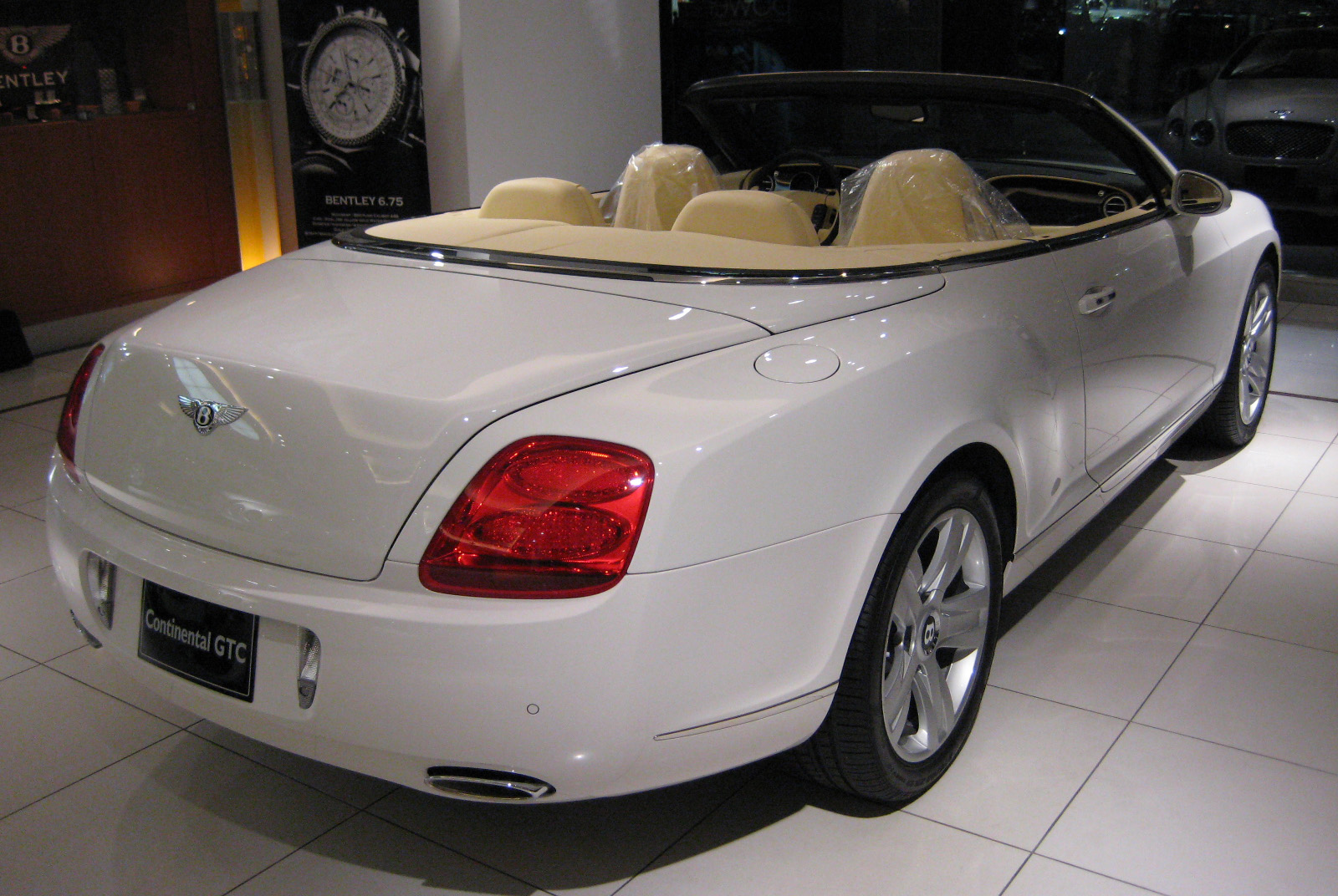
Bentley Continental GTC rear view

The convertible version of the Continental GT, the Continental GTC, was first presented in September 2005, and was introduced to several world markets in the autumn of 2006. The roof is produced by Karmann in Osnabrück, Germany.

The GTC uses identical powertrain detail as the GT, and can accelerate from 0 to 100 km/h (0.0 to 62.1 mph) in 5.1 seconds. With the roof up, it can reach a top speed of 314 km/h (195.1 mph), though with the roof down top speed drops to 305 km/h (189.5 mph).

The vehicle was unveiled at the 2006 New York International Auto Show, followed by the C. de Salamanca in Seville. The vehicle went on sale in late 2006.

=== 2008 model year update, Continental GT Speed, Mulliner Driving Specification (2007–2011) ===
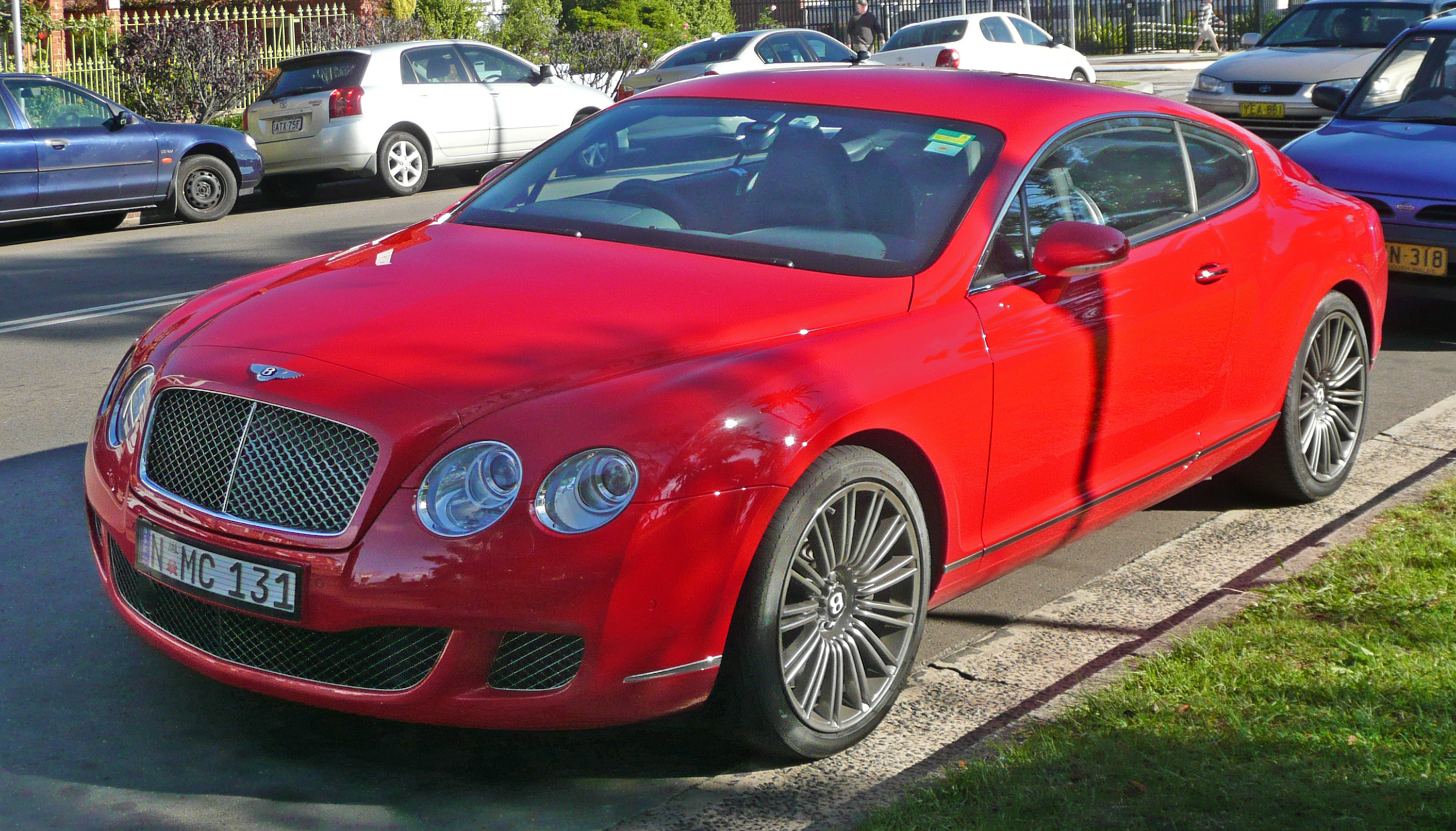
Bentley Continental GT Speed front view

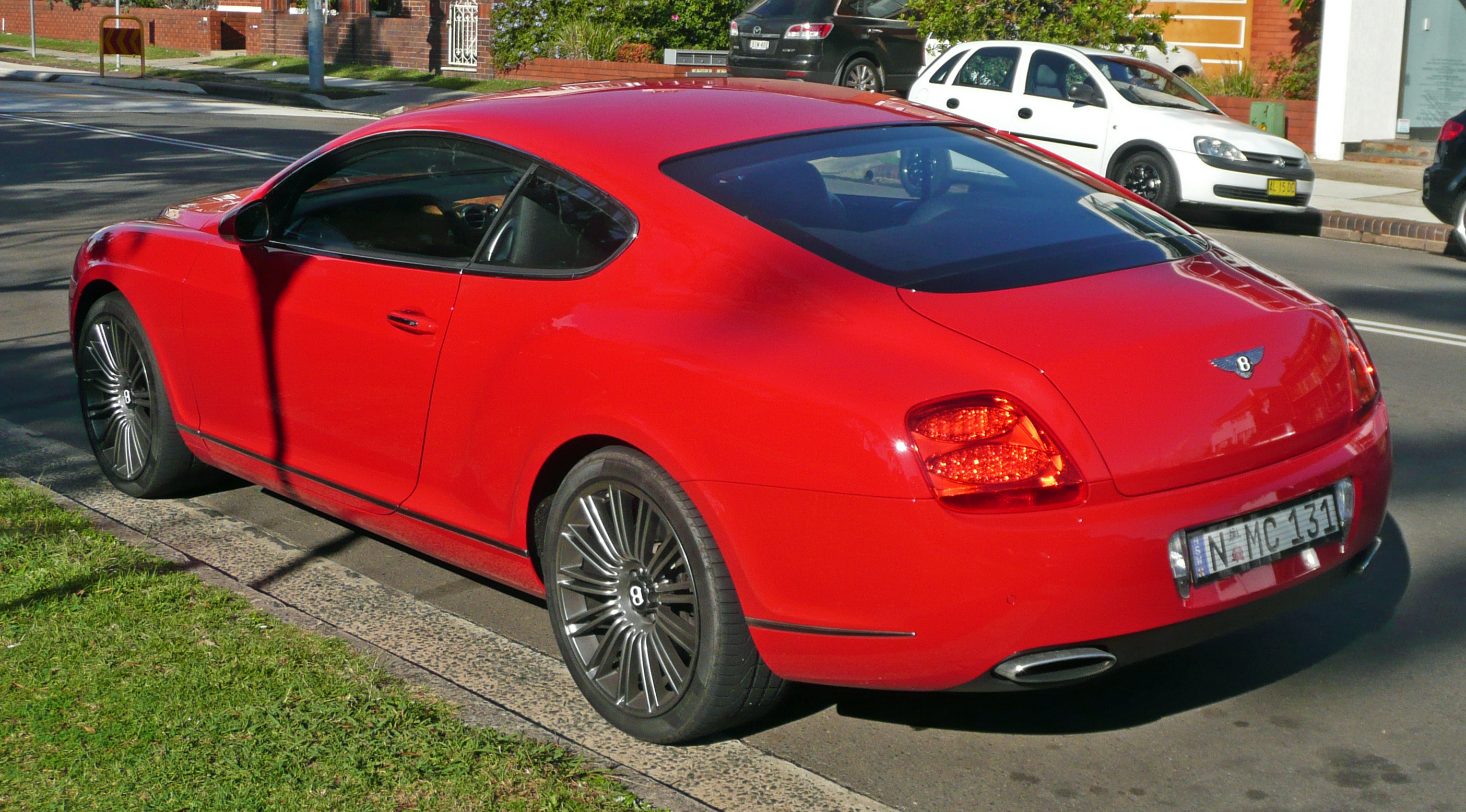
Bentley Continental GT Speed rear view

Changes to the Continental GT for 2008 include a 35 kg (77 lb) reduction in kerb weight due primarily to optimisation of suspension and cooling system components and an increased use of aluminium parts in the suspension. Other changes include a revised Servotronic power steering for improved feel and feedback, optional fade-resistant carbon ceramic brakes provide improved brake feel (only available on 20-inch wheels), new, more upright front grille and larger lower air intakes give improved airflow to aid engine cooling; chromed headlamp bezels, two new exterior paint colours (Cumbrian Green and Granite), two new leather hide colours (Newmarket Tan and Cumbrian Green), new low-friction dampers, new 'Sport Traction' mode for the Bosch 8.1 ESP system and a Bentley 'B' brake pedal.

The Mulliner Driving Specification includes drilled alloy sport foot-pedals, knurled chrome/hide gear lever, diamond quilted hide to seat facings, doors and rear quarter panels.

The Continental GT Speed is a version of the Continental GT with increased engine power to 608 PS (447 kW; 600 bhp) and 750 N⋅m (553 lb⋅ft) of torque. It also includes a lowered ride height, uprated spring/damper settings and uprated anti-roll bars for improved agility and body control; unique 9.5Jx20-inch wheels with bespoke Pirelli P-Zero performance tyres, retuned speed-sensitive Servotronic system, solid-mounted front subframe and stiffer rear bushings; 'Dynamic' mode for the Bosch 8.1 ESP system, front grille and lower air intakes in dark-tinted chrome matrix and wider rifled sports exhaust tail pipes.

The Continental GT Speed was unveiled at Laguna Village Polo in 2007, followed by the 2007 Frankfurt Motor Show. Both the new Continental GT and GT Speed were available to order from August 2007. Additionally, 2008 model year vehicles also include a price increase over previous models.

=== 2009 Continental GTC update, Continental GTC Speed, Mulliner Driving Specification (2009–2011) ===
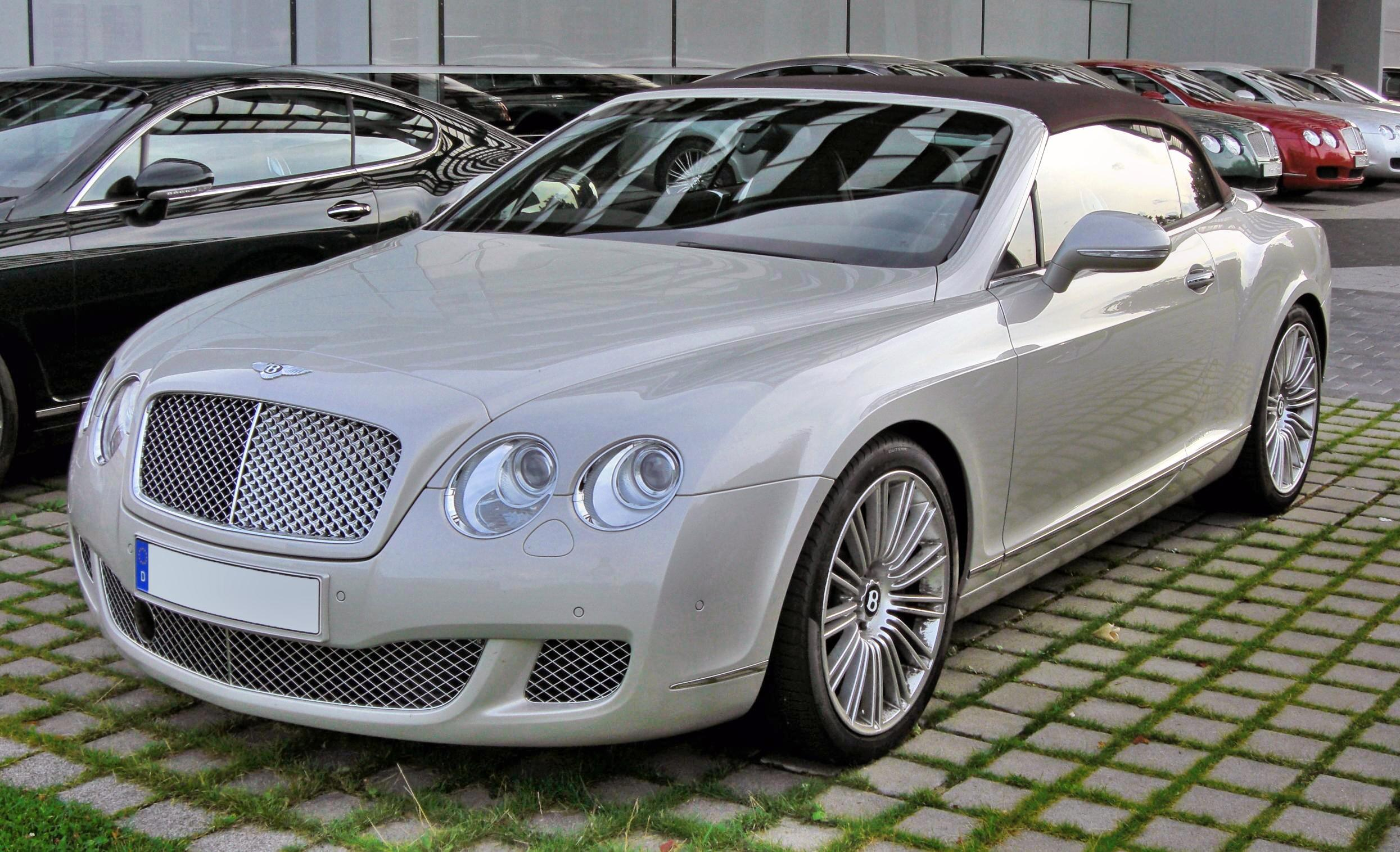
2009 Bentley Continental GTC Speed front view

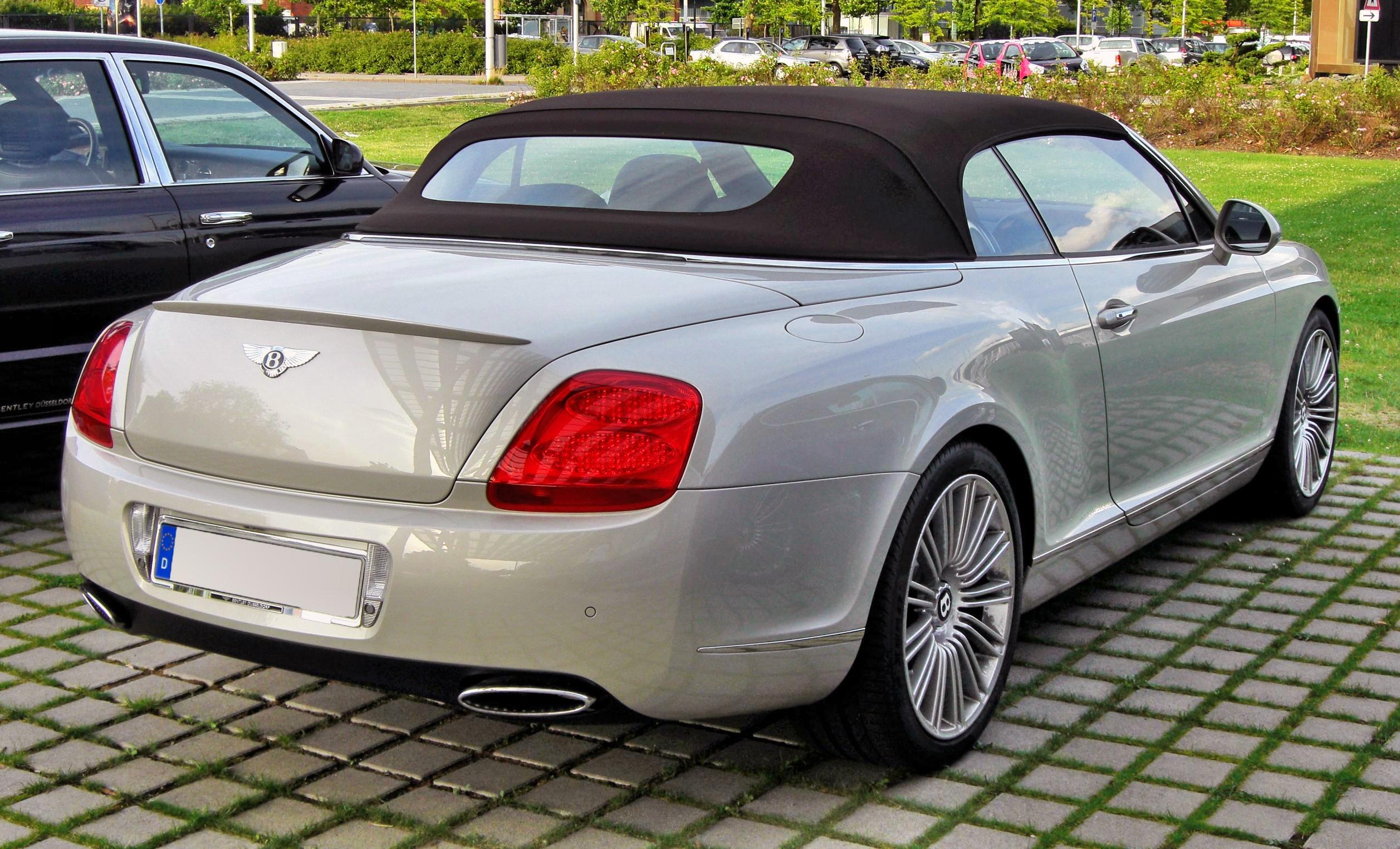
2009 Bentley Continental GTC Speed rear view

Changes to the Continental GTC for 2009 include a new more upright front grille, larger lower air intake, chrome headlamp bezels, retuned Servotronic power steering for improved feedback and feel, new optional Follow-to-stop, radar–based Adaptive Cruise Control, optional carbon ceramic brakes with 420 mm front and 356 mm rear discs and eight-piston callipers (only available with 20 – inch wheels), two new exterior colours (Aquamarine, Blue Crystal) and a new interior colour (Aquamarine).

The Mulliner Driving Specification includes a choice of three standard veneers (Burr Walnut, Dark Stained Burr Walnut, Piano Black, drilled alloy sport foot-pedals, gear lever finished in knurled chrome and hide, diamond quilted hide to seat facings, doors and rear quarter panels; embroidered Bentley emblem to seat facings, 20-inch two-piece alloy sports wheels (GTC only) or 20-inch multi-spoke alloy wheels in Dark Tint painted finish (GTC Speed only).

The Continental GTC Speed is based on the Continental GTC with Mulliner Driving Specification. It is equipped with the engine from the Continental GT Speed as well as radiator and lower air intake grilles with a dark tinted matrix, 9.5Jx20-inch multi-spoke alloy wheels, Bentley-bespoke Pirelli PZero tyres, lowered suspension by 10 mm at the front and 15 mm, wider twin-rifled exhaust tail pipes and a new boot-mounted lip spoiler.

The vehicle was unveiled at the 2009 North American International Auto Show.

=== Continental GT Series 51 (2009) ===
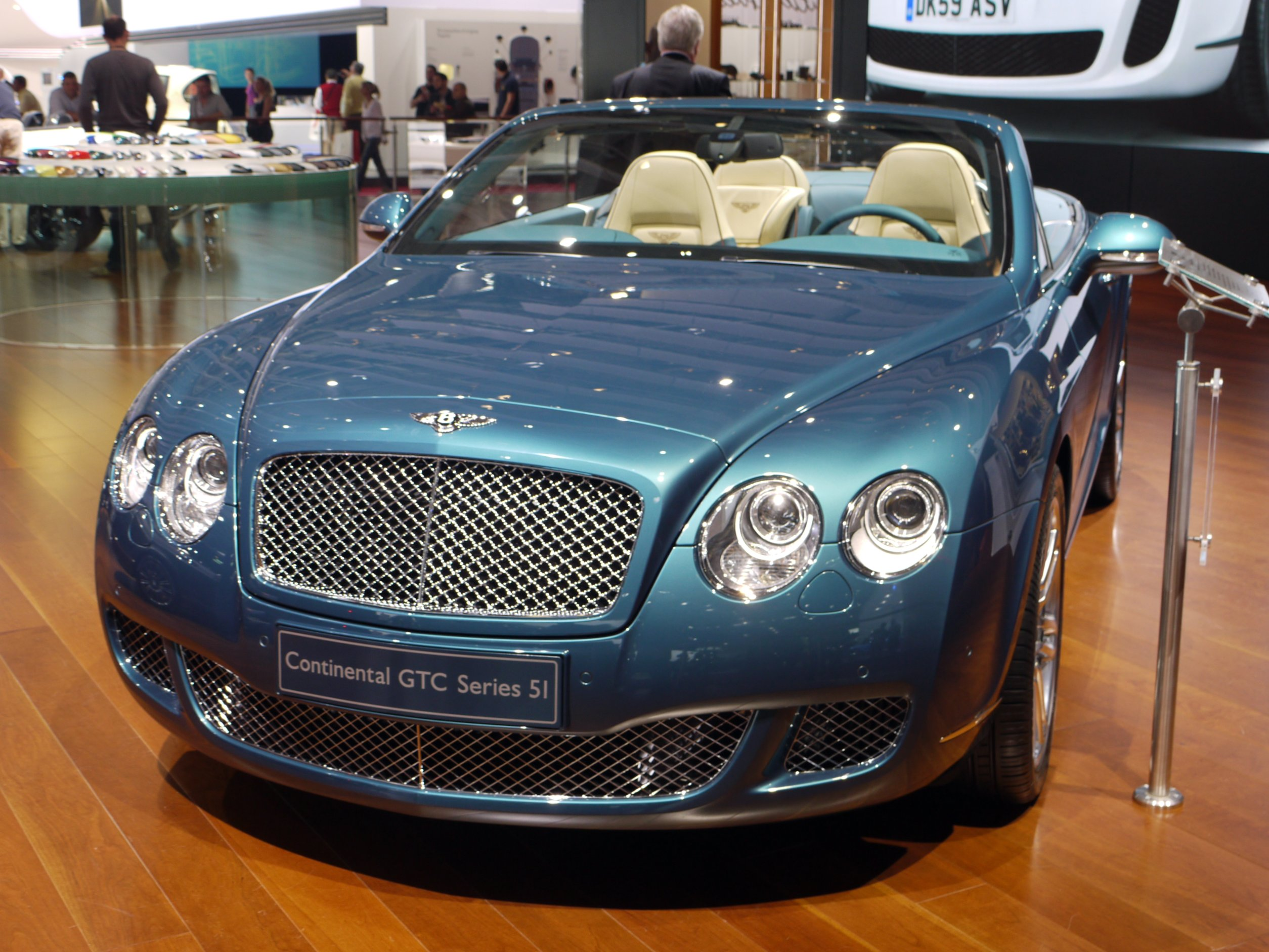
Bentley Continental GT Series 51 (France)

The Series 51 models include additional vehicle customisation options for the Continental GT and GTC, such as use of non-indented hide for diamond quilting and contrast piping for the seats and doors as well as bespoke Series 51 treadplates. Other options include Dark and Bright 'Engine Spin' aluminium dashboard and centre console options, Amboyna veneer, colour matched overmats and boot carpets, 20-inch 14-spoke polished Diamond wheel with a dark centre cap, a signature '51' badge on the front wings and an optional two-tone paint job (with one colour running over the bonnet, roof and flowing down to the boot).

The vehicles (including a Continental GTC with Imperial Blue as a main and secondary hide, Linen seat and door inserts and Newmarket Tan as the accent colour) were unveiled at the 2009 Frankfurt Motor Show, followed by the Continental GTC model in 2010 at the North American International Auto Show.

Ordering of Series 51 models began from 1 September 2009.

=== Continental Supersports (2009–2011) ===
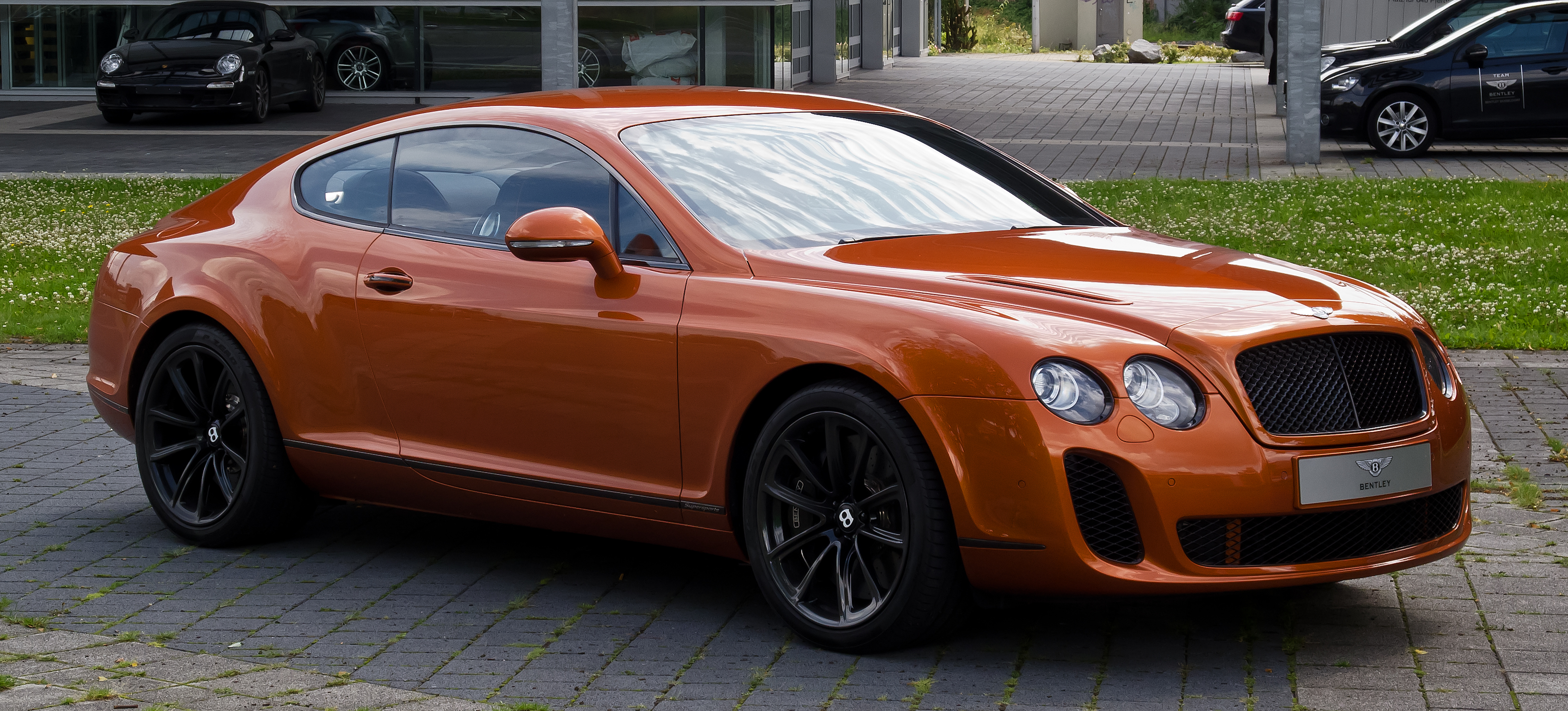
Bentley Continental Supersports coupe front view

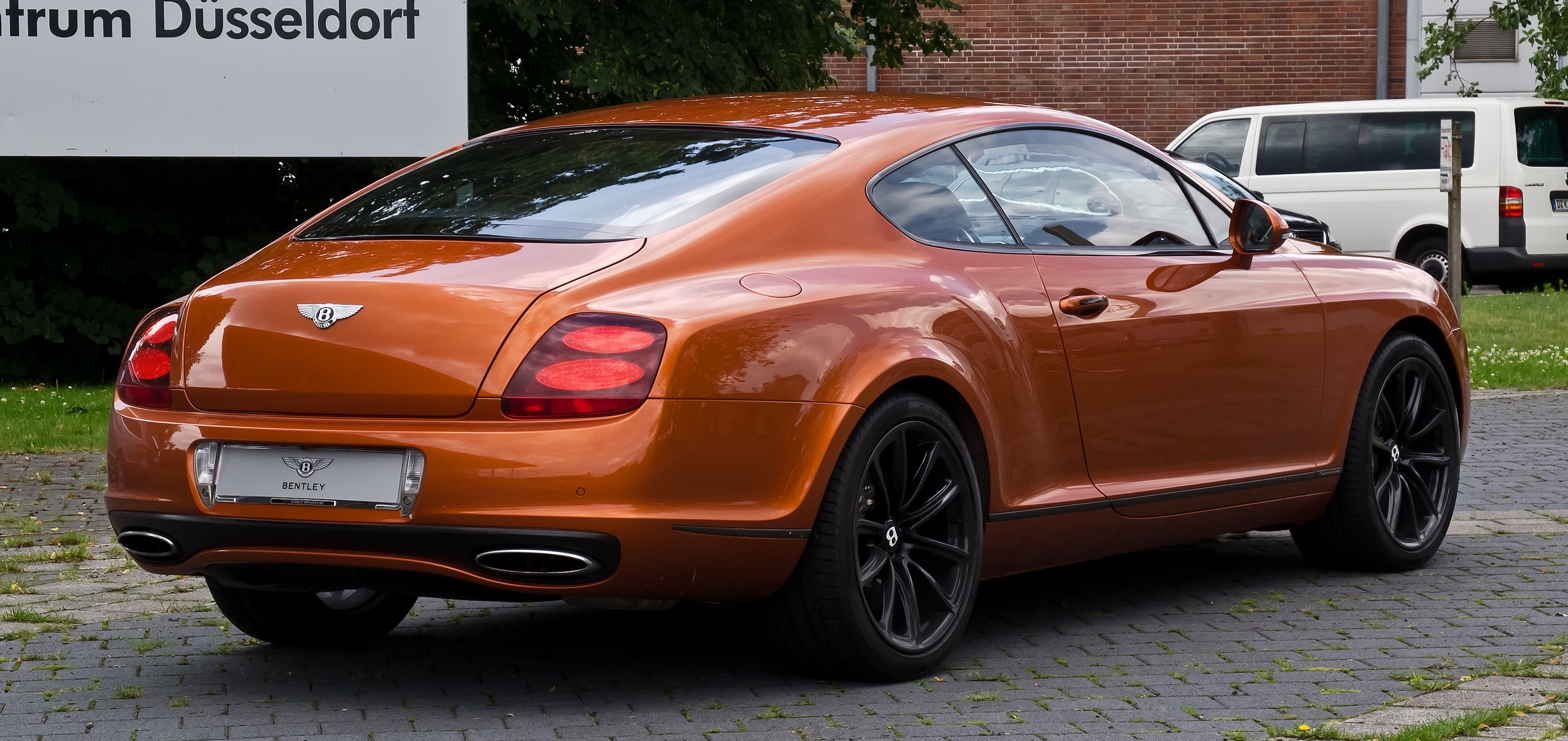
Bentley Continental Supersports coupe rear view

In February 2009, Bentley announced a limited production of the Bentley Continental Supersports. The car was unveiled at the 2009 Geneva Motor Show, announced by Jay Leno, to be available in autumn 2009 worldwide, followed by FlexFuel-compatible models in North America by summer 2010.

The first Bentley capable of running on both motor spirit and biofuel (E85 ethanol), its 6.0 litre W12 engine is rated at 630 PS (463 kW; 621 bhp) at 6,000 rpm and 800 N⋅m (590 lbf⋅ft) at 1,700–5,600 rpm – using either fuel. The car can accelerate from 0 to 100 km/h (0.0 to 62.1 mph) in 3.7 seconds and 0 to 160 km/h (0.0 to 99.4 mph) in 8.9 seconds, with a top speed of 330 km/h (205.1 mph). This made it the fastest and the most powerful production Bentley ever at the time of production. The Supersports was already known as the best handling Bentley. Bentley says the Supersports can deliver 1.29 g forces on a 300-foot (91 m) skid pad, as compared to its sibling the Continental GT speed, which can perform up to 0.98 g forces on a 300-foot (91 m) skid pad.

It includes a revised ZF 6HP 28A tiptronic automatic with a "Quickshift" system that reduces shift times by 50%, and enables double downshifts. The car uses a Torsen T-3 centre differential for the 40:60 rear-biased torque split for the four-wheel drive system. Other changes include revised Continuous Damping Control (CDC), 20-inch lightweight alloy wheels (with increased 25 mm (1.0 in) offset on rear wheels) with 275/35 ZR20 Pirelli Ultra High Performance tyres, advanced Bosch Electronic Stability Programme (ESP) with switchable Dynamic Mode, Carbon fibre-reinforced Silicon Carbide (C/SiC) ceramic disc brakes (claimed to be the largest brakes ever fitted to a production car at the time of production), 110 kilograms (243 lb) weight saving over Continental GT Speed and an automatic retractable spoiler (deploys at 80 km/h (50 mph)).

The US model has an MSRP of approximately US$270,000, with early vehicles not having E85 capability, which would be available in summer of 2010 for the US market.

=== Continental Supersports Convertible (2010–2011) ===
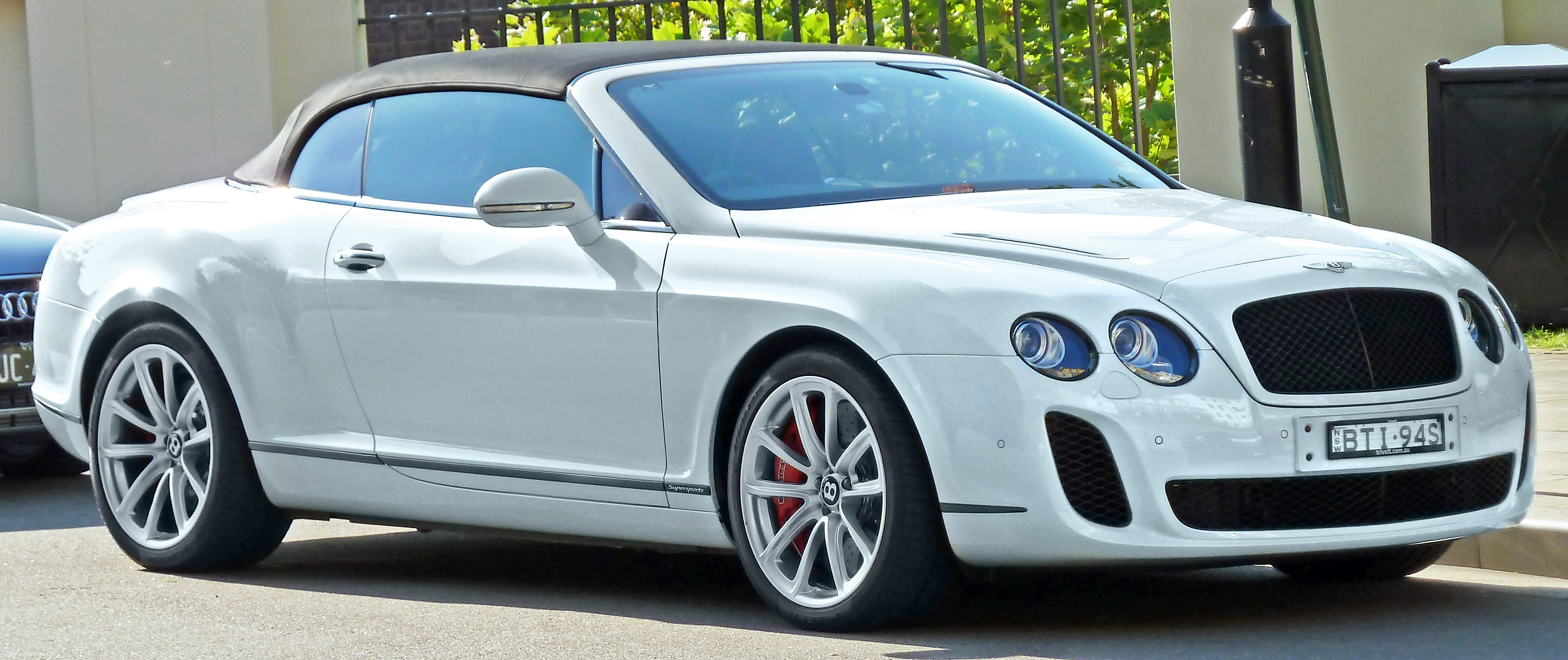
Bentley Continental Supersports convertible front view

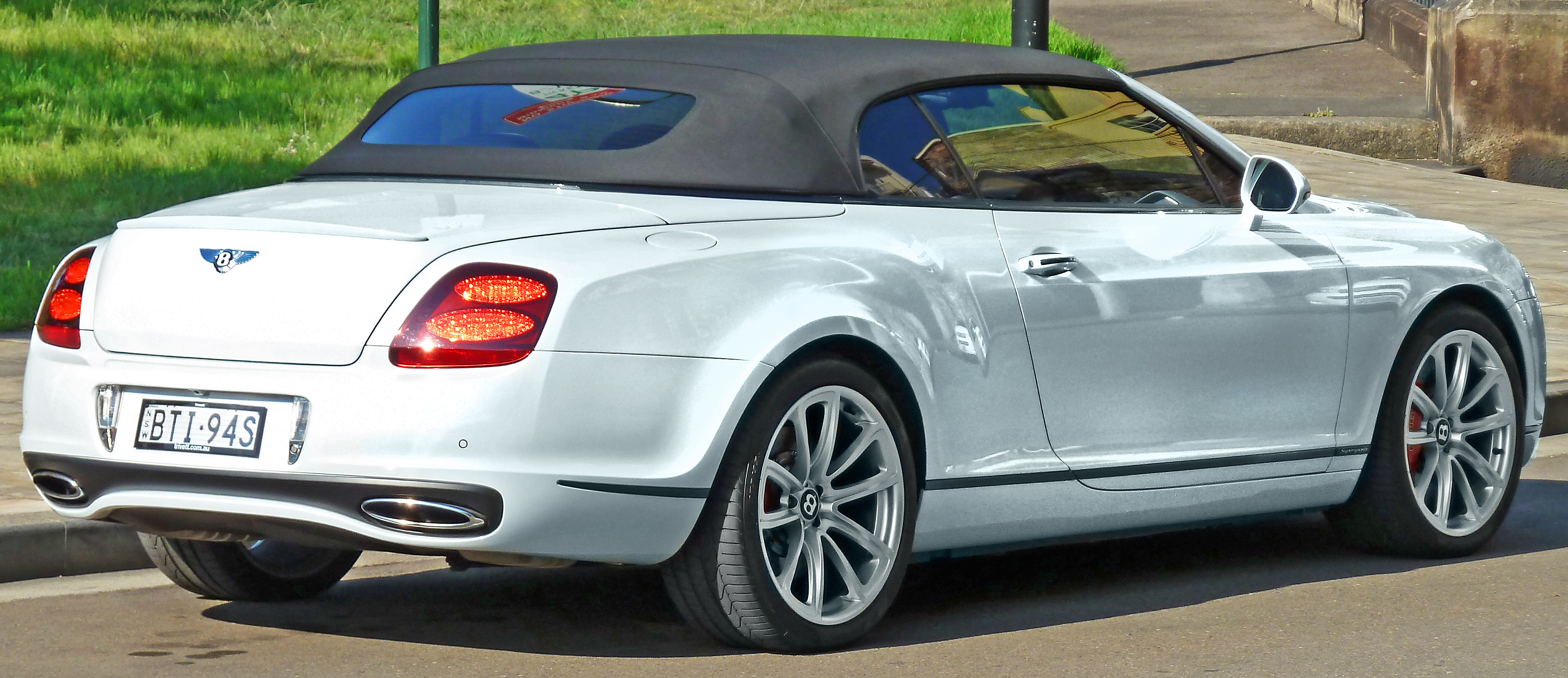
Bentley Continental Supersports rear view

The Continental Supersports Convertible is a convertible version of the Continental Supersports coupe. It features a revised version of the ZF 6HP 26 transmission with "Quickshift," cutting shift times by 50% and enabling double downshifts. The convertible also gets new, lightweight 20-inch alloy wheels that are 22 lb (10.0 kg) lighter than the standard wheel.

The vehicle was unveiled at the 2010 Geneva Motor Show. The US model went on sale in Summer of 2010 for $280,400.

== Second generation (2011–2018) ==
Second generation
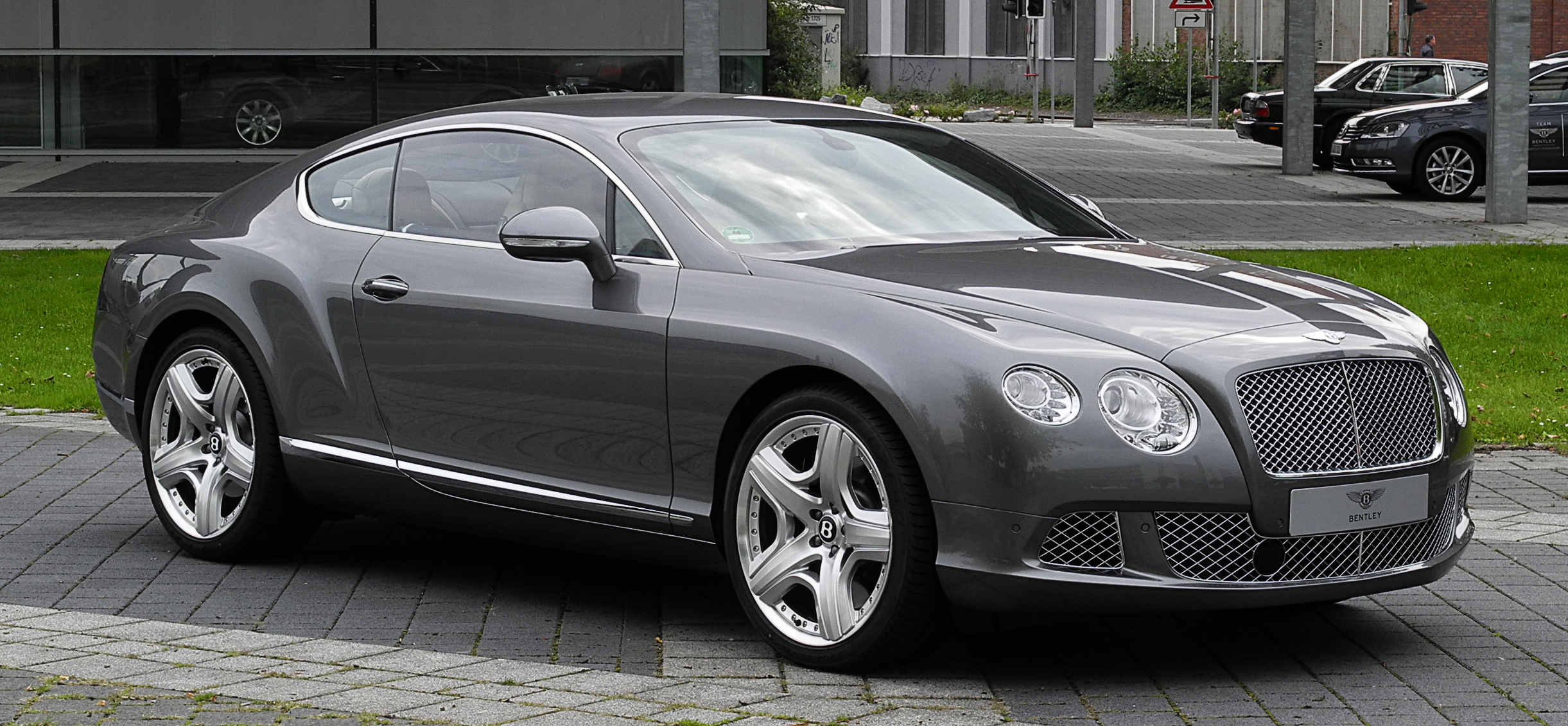

Overview
- Production: 2011–2018
- Designer: Dirk van Braeckel

Body and chassis
- Platform: Volkswagen Group D1
- Related: Bentley Flying Spur; Volkswagen Phaeton

Powertrain
- Engine: 4.0 L EA824/CND twin-turbo V8; 6.0 L EA398 twin-turbo W12
- Transmission: 8-speed tiptronic automatic

Dimensions
- Wheelbase: 2,746 mm (108.1 in)
- Length: 4,806 mm (189.2 in)
- Width: 1,944 mm (76.5 in)
- Height: 1,404 mm (55.3 in)
- Kerb weight: 2,320 kg (5,115 lb)

=== Continental GT W12 (2011–2018) ===
The vehicle was unveiled at the 2010 Paris Motor Show.

Ordering of the Continental GT began in October 2010, with deliveries of 2011 Continental GT beginning in the first quarter of 2011.

=== Continental GT V8 (2012–2018) ===
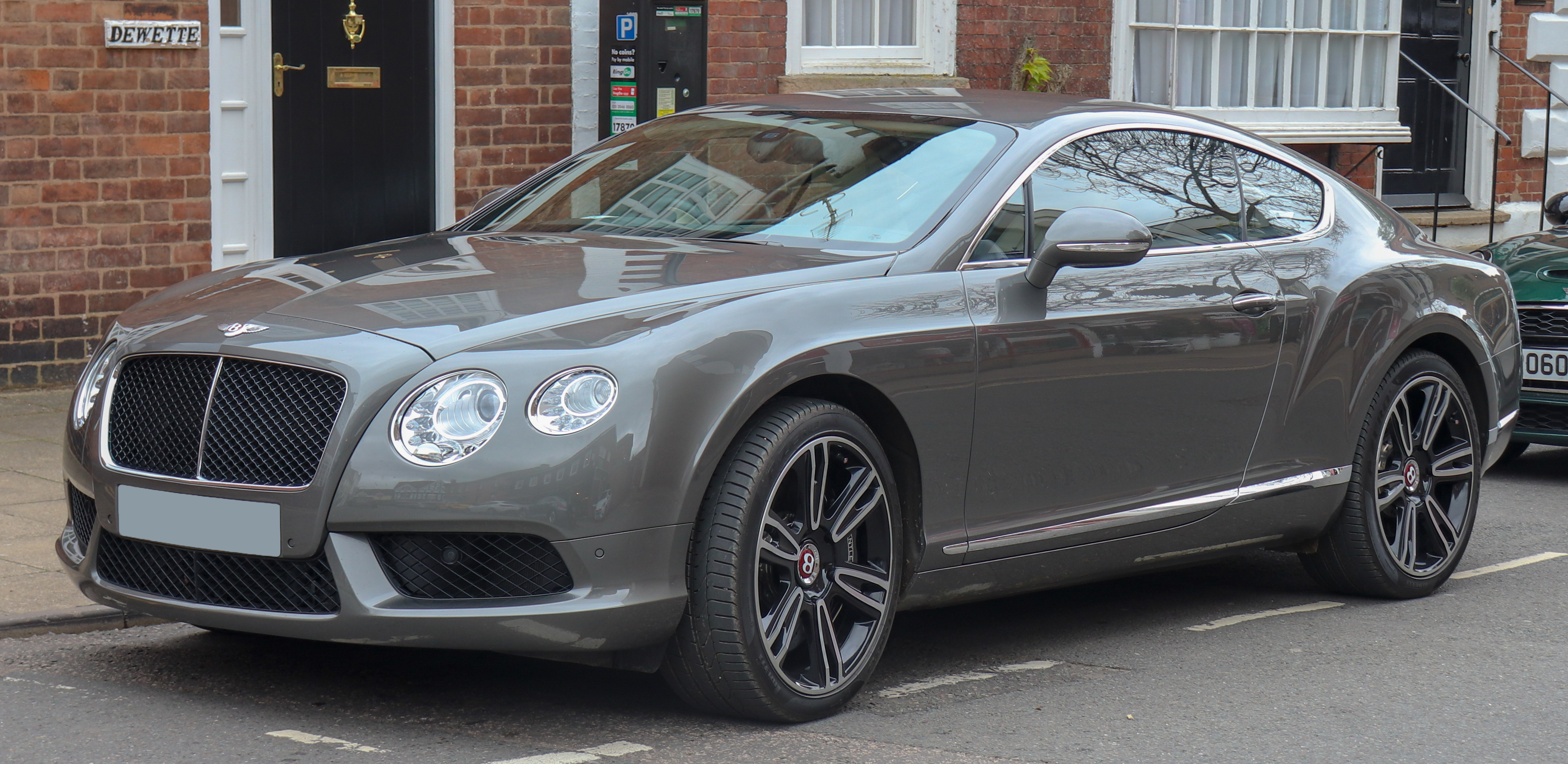
Continental GT V8 exterior

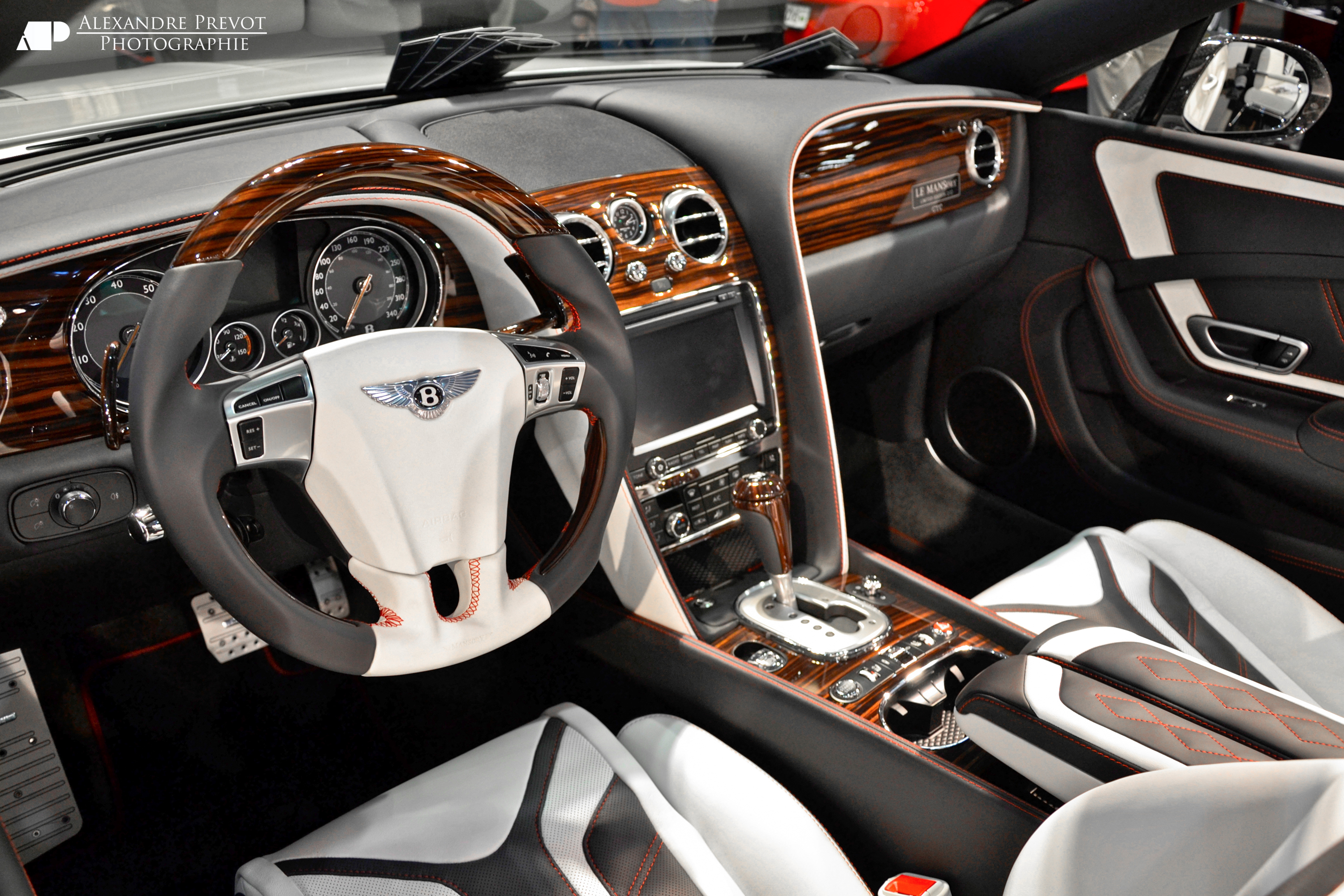
Continental GT V8 interior

The GT V8 version of the Continental GT has a twin-turbo 4-litre (3,993 cc) V8 engine (developed jointly with Audi) that produces 500 hp (373 kW) and 487 lb⋅ft (660 N⋅m) of torque. The car is capable of reaching a top speed of 192 mph (309 km/h). It also features cylinder deactivation technology that can deactivate half of the cylinders when they're not needed to improve fuel economy by up to 8%. Other changes, including on-demand steering assistance, weight reduction, better engine heat management, overrun alternator charging and eco-tyres, improve overall fuel consumption by 40% from the W12's 17.1 mpg to the V8's 26.1 mpg.

The vehicle was unveiled at the 2012 North American International Auto Show, followed by the SkyLounge in Munich, the 2012 Beijing International Automotive Exhibition and the 2012 Goodwood Festival of Speed.

=== Continental GTC W12 (2011–2018) ===
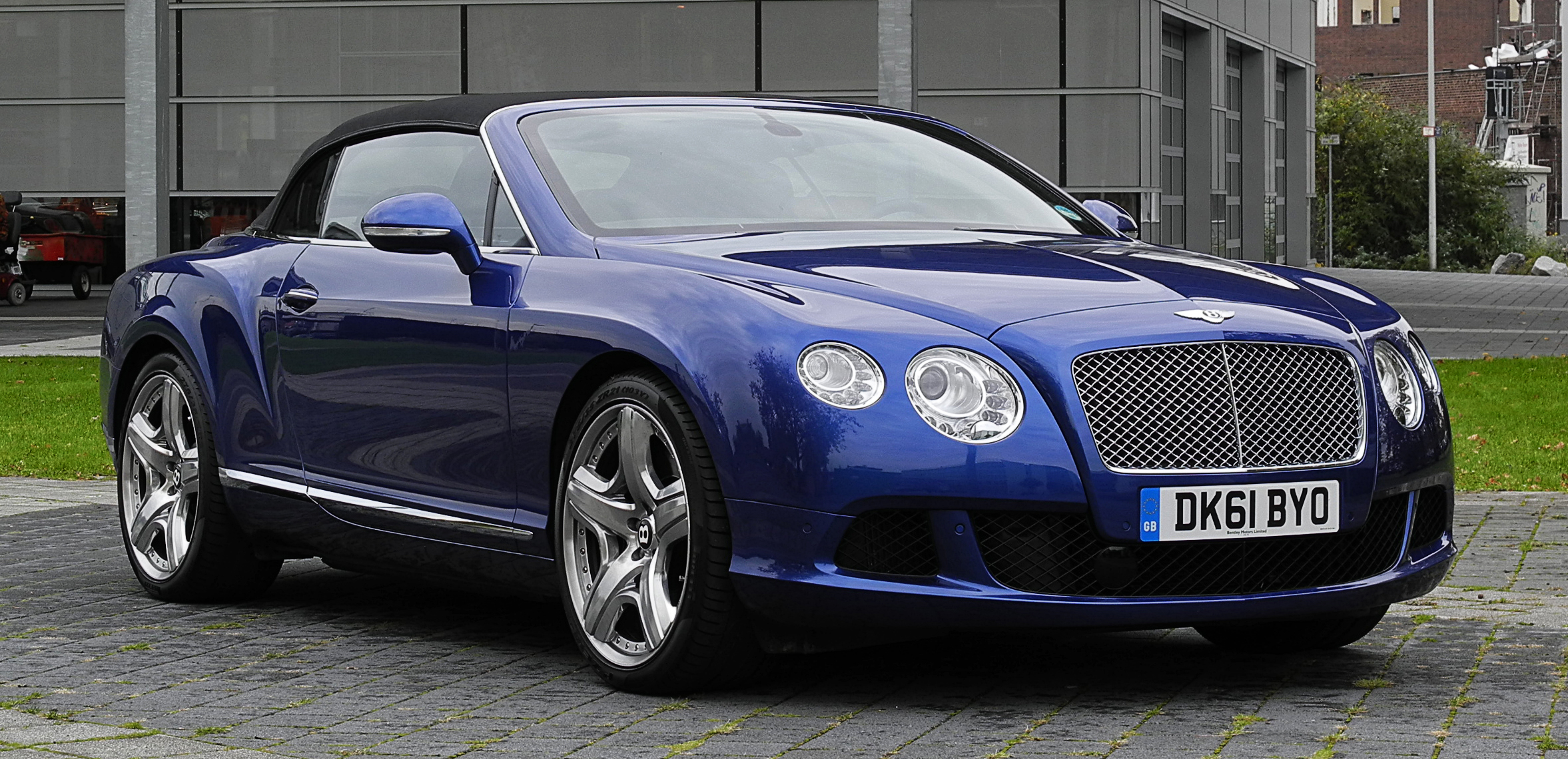
Continental GTC W12 front view

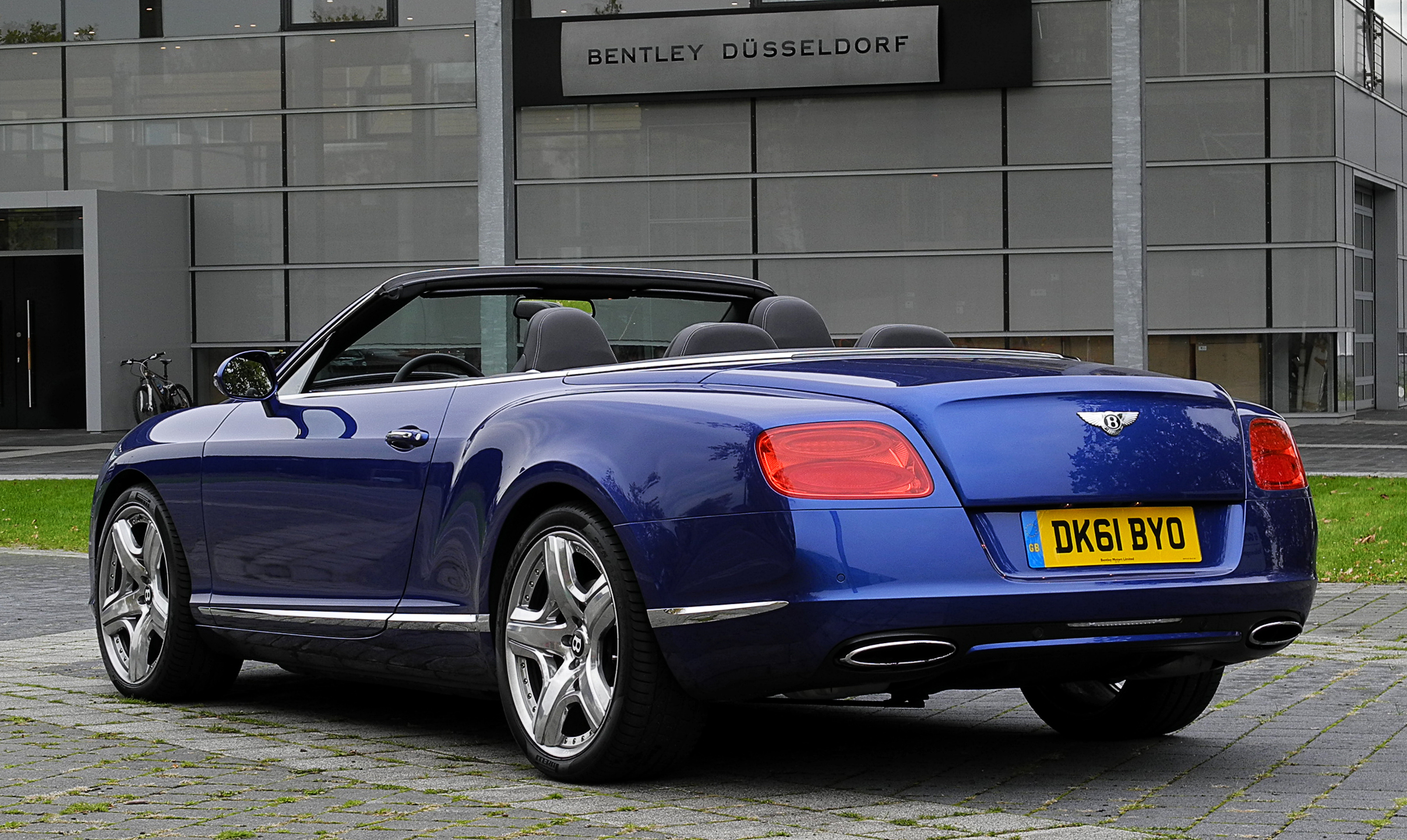
Continental GTC W12 rear view

The vehicle was unveiled at the 2011 Frankfurt Motor Show, followed by the 2012 Qatar International Motor Show.

Delivery of the Bentley Continental GTC began in late 2011.

=== Continental GT Speed Coupé (2012–2018) ===
The Continental GT Speed Coupé is a version of the Continental GT W12 with increased engine power to 616 hp (459 kW; 625 PS) and 590 lb⋅ft (800 N⋅m) of torque. It also features a lowered ride height and chassis and uprated suspension. It has a top speed of 330 km/h (205 mph) and can accelerate from 0–60 mph (0–97 km/h) in 4.0 seconds.

The vehicle was first unveiled at the Goodwood Festival of Speed in 2012, followed by the 2012 Pebble Beach Concours d'Elegance, the 2012 Moscow International Auto Salon, the 2012 Paris Motor Show, 2012 AUTO ZÜRICH, and the 2012 LA Auto Show.

=== Continental GTC V8 (2012–2018) ===
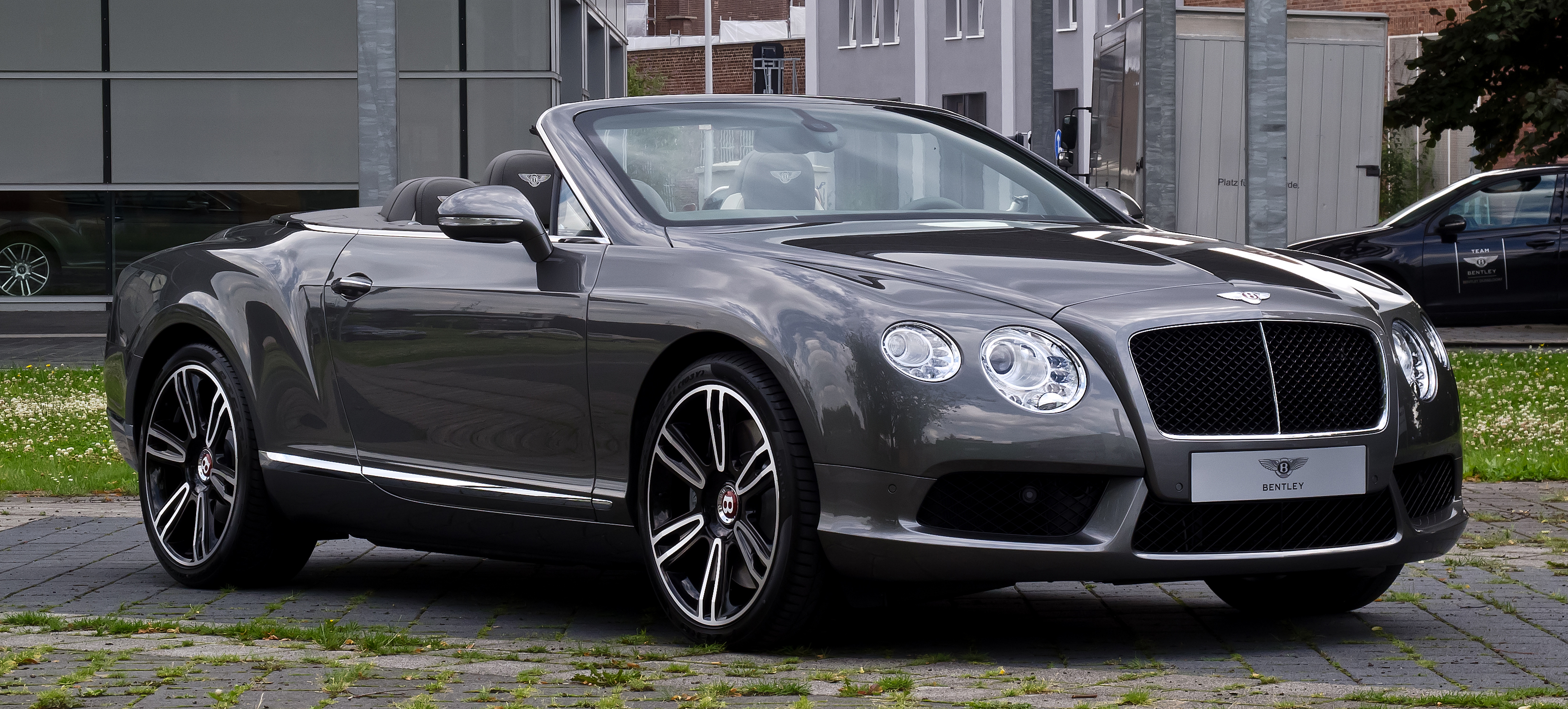
Continental GTC V8

The vehicle was first unveiled at the 2012 North American International Auto Show, followed by the 2012 Geneva Motor Show, 2012 New York International Auto Show, 2012 Paris International Auto Salon and the 2013 Los Angeles Auto Show.

=== Continental GT Speed Convertible (2013–2018) ===
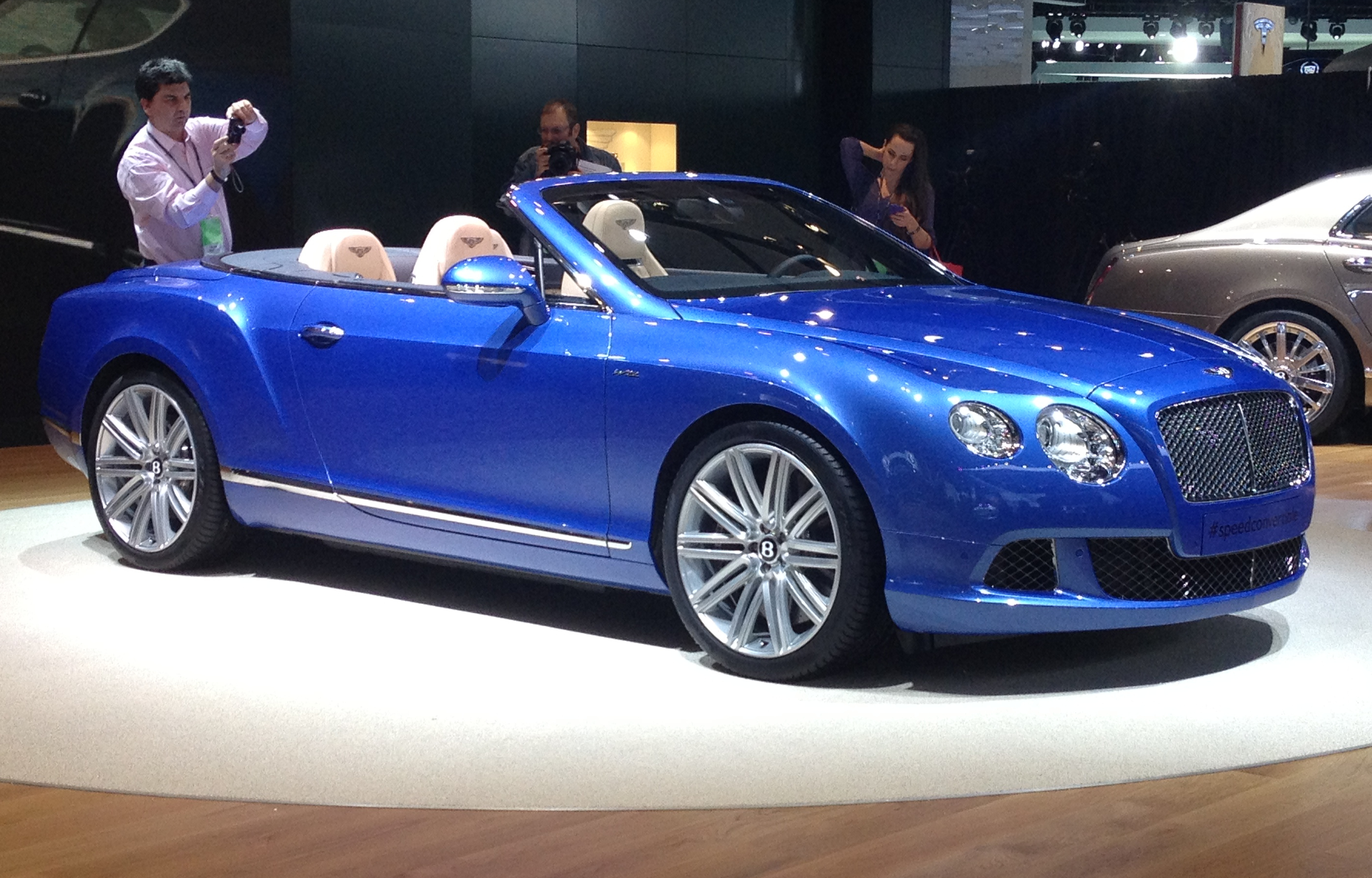
Continental GT Speed Convertible

The Continental GT Speed Convertible includes an ME17 engine management system, self-levelling system set 10 mm lower than the 575 PS Continental GT convertible, Electronic Stability Control with Dynamic Mode, matrix radiator grille and bumper air intakes in dark-tint chrome finish, 21" Speed alloy wheels in silver or an optional dark tint, diamond-quilted hide upholstery, Dark Tint Aluminium 'engine spin' finish (optional fine wood veneers, satin-finish carbon fibre option for fascia and centre console), top speed of 325 km/h (202 mph).

The vehicle was unveiled at the 2013 North American International Auto Show.

=== Continental GT V8 S (2014–2018) ===
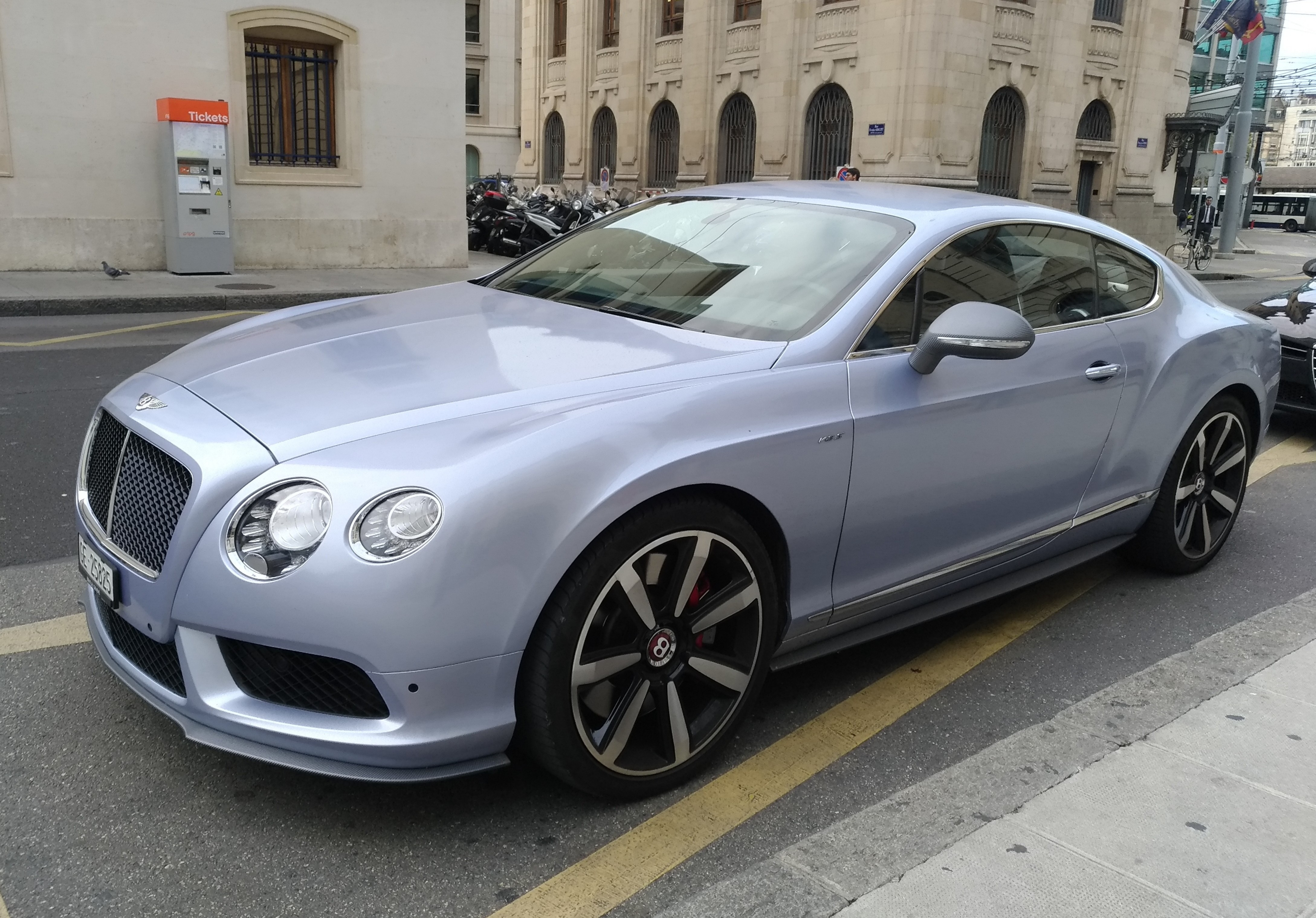
Continental GT V8 S

Available in a coupe and convertible body, The Continental GT V8 S is a version of the Continental GT V8 with increased engine power to 528 PS (388 kW; 521 hp) at 6,000 rpm and 680 N⋅m (502 lb⋅ft) of torque at 1,700 rpm. The 8-speed ZF automatic transmission's calibration was also enhanced to provide a more responsive drive. The GT V8 S also features increased agility and body control to match the engine's higher output, achieved by revising the damper and spring rates, suspension uprights, anti-roll bars and stability control system as well as lowering the car 10mm. These changes were similar, though not identical to those fitted to GT Speed models of the same year. An aerodynamic front splitter, discrete side sills and rear diffuser in Beluga gloss were also fitted as well as a front radiator matrix also finished in Beluga gloss, new exclusive 20-inch wheels with open-spoke design, red-painted brake calipers, optional sports exhaust, optional duo-tone interiors, choice of interior trim in seventeen hide colours, unique contrast centre stripe for the hide-trimmed roof lining matching the colour of the main hide, knurled chrome detailing to the gearshift lever, Piano Black veneers and 'V8 S' on each sill tread plate as well as on both front wings. For the first time on a factory GT, dark tint front and rear lights were also made available as an option and proved very popular, so much so that they were standardised on the GT Speed model from the following model year.

The vehicle was unveiled at the 2013 Frankfurt Motor Show, followed by the 2014 North American International Auto Show, 2014 Beijing International Automotive Show and the 2014 Goodwood Festival of Speed.

The vehicles were set to arrive in Bentley dealerships from early 2014.

=== 2014 model year update ===
Changes to the 2014 Continental GT include the debut of seven distinctive equipment packages. Premier Specification includes additional technology and comfort whilst the Interior Style Specification uses the best of Bentley hand-craftsmanship for the ultimate tailored cabin.

=== Continental GT Speed (2013–2018) ===
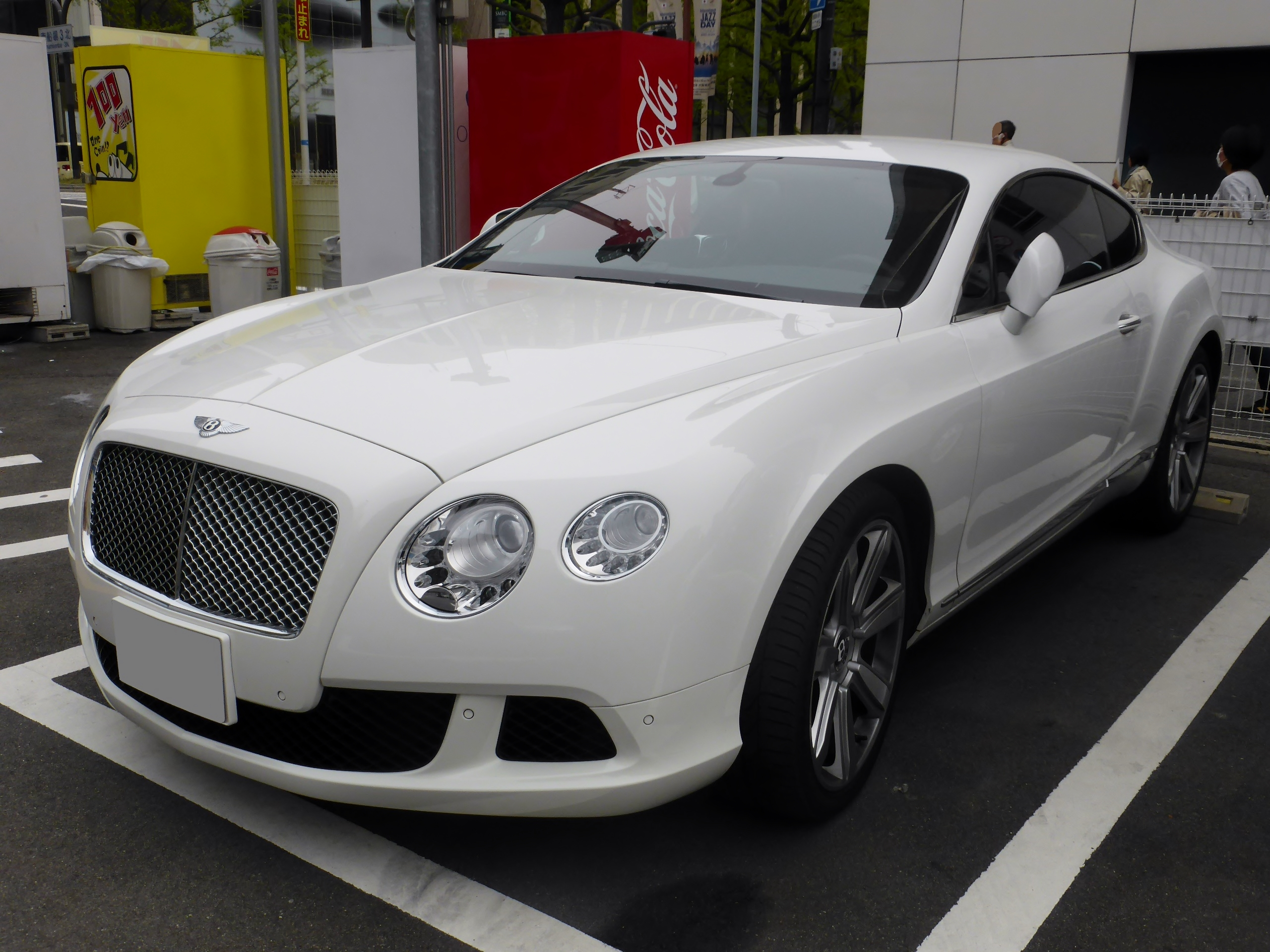
2014 Continental GT Speed

The Continental GT Speed Coupé was unveiled at the 2014 Geneva Motor Show, followed by the 2014 New York International Auto Show (coupe) and the 2014 Beijing International Automotive Show.

Delivery was set to begin in summer of 2014.

Changes to the new Continental GT Speed included increased engine power to 625 PS (460 kW; 616 hp) and 820 N⋅m (605 lb⋅ft) of torque, sports suspension (uprated anti-rolls bars, air springs, dampers and suspension uprights as well as revised stability control) dark tint front upper and lower grills, Speed branded treadplates, unique design 21" Speed wheels and a chrome 'Speed' badge on both front wings. Mulliner Drivers Specification was also included as standard and from the 2015 model year the GT Speed came as standard with a body coloured bodykit including front splitter, side skirts and rear diffuser, 21-inch Dark tint Speed design wheels (previously an option), a choice of red or black painted brake calipers and dark tint front & rear lamps. Inside a new unique Speed colour split was made available and a 'Speed' badge was installed on the passenger side fascia plate in a similar design to those fitted on the front wings. 2015 model year cars also came with an addition 10PS and 10Nm of torque, both helping to increase top speed and reduce acceleration times.

From the 2016 model year the Speed model gained the range face-lift enhancements of other GT models as well as a new 21" 5 spoke 'directional' alloy wheel design and again more power, this time an increase of 8PS for a total of 642PS. This makes the 2016 model year Speed the most powerful Continental GT yet outside of the flagship Supersports model introduced in 2017 for the final year of GT production for that generation.

=== 2015 model year update ===
Changes to the Continental GT for 2015 include a new front bumper with a smaller radiator shell, redesigned wings with a new vent with a metallic 'B' adornment, new bright chrome wing badges for the V8 S and W12 models, redesigned boot lid, reshaped and widened rear bumper with full-width brightware, a new rear diffuser design for V8 S and GT Speed, new 20 and 21-inch wheels (new 20-inch 6 tri-spoke wheel for GT V8 and GT W12 with painted finish for V8 and bright machined for W12, 21-inch seven-twin-spoke wheel in Graphite grey with bright machined spokes for Mulliner Driving Specification models, addition of 21-inch five-spoke directional sports wheel for V8 S and GT Speed), three new body colours choices: Marlin (a rich metallic blue), Camel (a soft golden tone) and Jetstream (a light, bright metallic blue), new straight-fluting pattern for 4 seats with Mulliner Driving Specification (standard on GT Speed) includes a tightened 'small-diamond' pattern on seat upholstery, redesigned driver controls, optional sports-orientated steering wheel, larger gear-shift paddles incorporating tactile knurled metal embellishers, new dials and graphics at driver's instrument panel, interior illuminated by LEDs, centre console with a new black gear lever surround, a new hidden storage compartment between rear seats capable of accommodating and charging electronic devices including iPads, optional semi-aniline hide for the seat cushions and backrests in the GT W12 and GT Speed, 2 new leather colours choices (Shortbread, Camel), new Alcantara headlining option (colour matched to all 17 of the available interior hide colours) for the GT V8 S, GT W12 and Speed coupe; optional on-board WiFi, increased engine power to 590 PS (434 kW; 582 hp) and 720 N⋅m (531 lb⋅ft) for the GT W12, 6-cylinder deactivation for the GT W12.

The vehicle was unveiled at the 2015 Geneva Motor Show, followed by the 2015 Frankfurt Motor Show (Continental GT Speed Convertible, GT3). Delivery began in summer of 2015.

=== Continental Supersports (2017–2018) ===
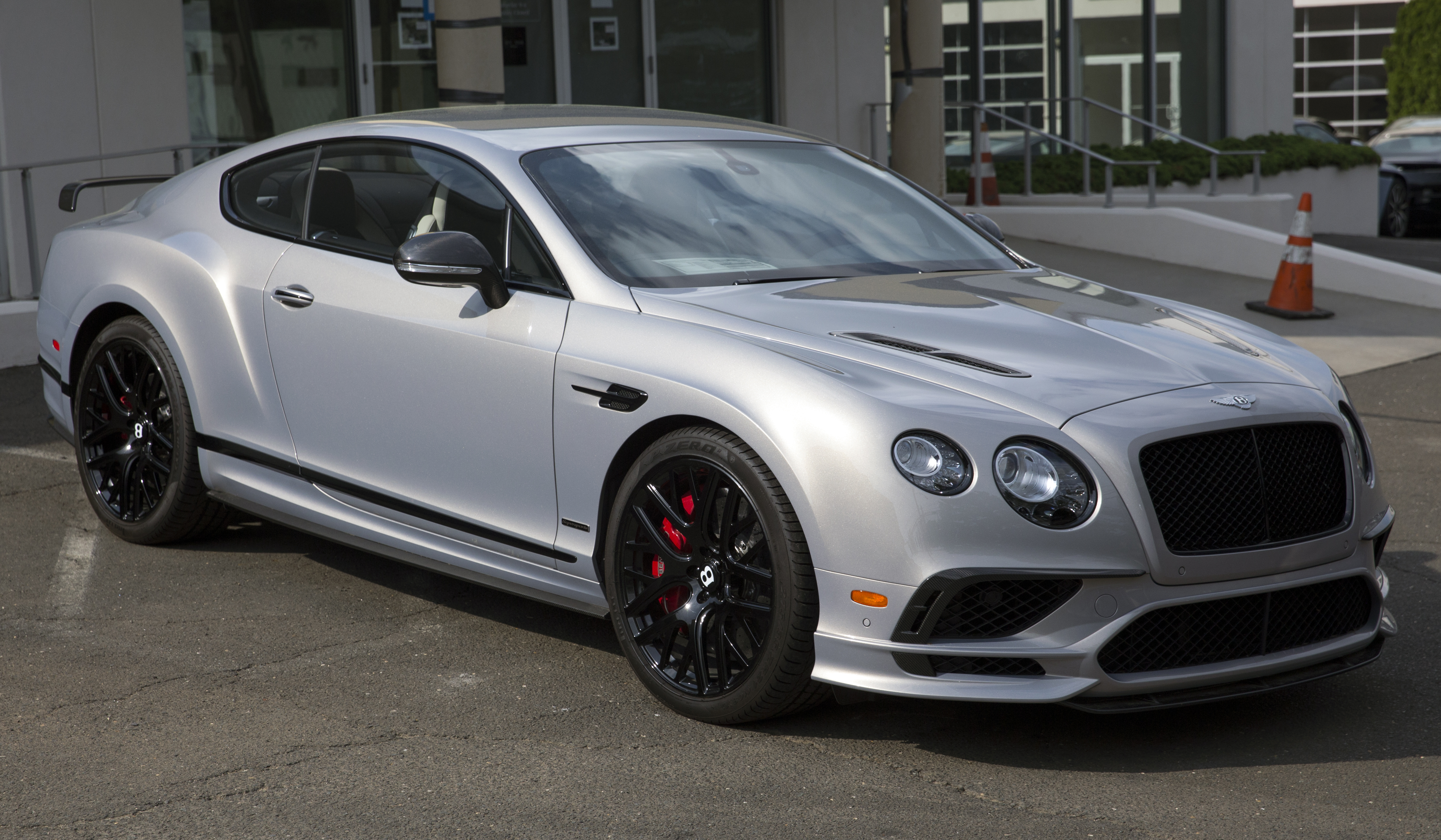
Bentley Continental Supersports front view

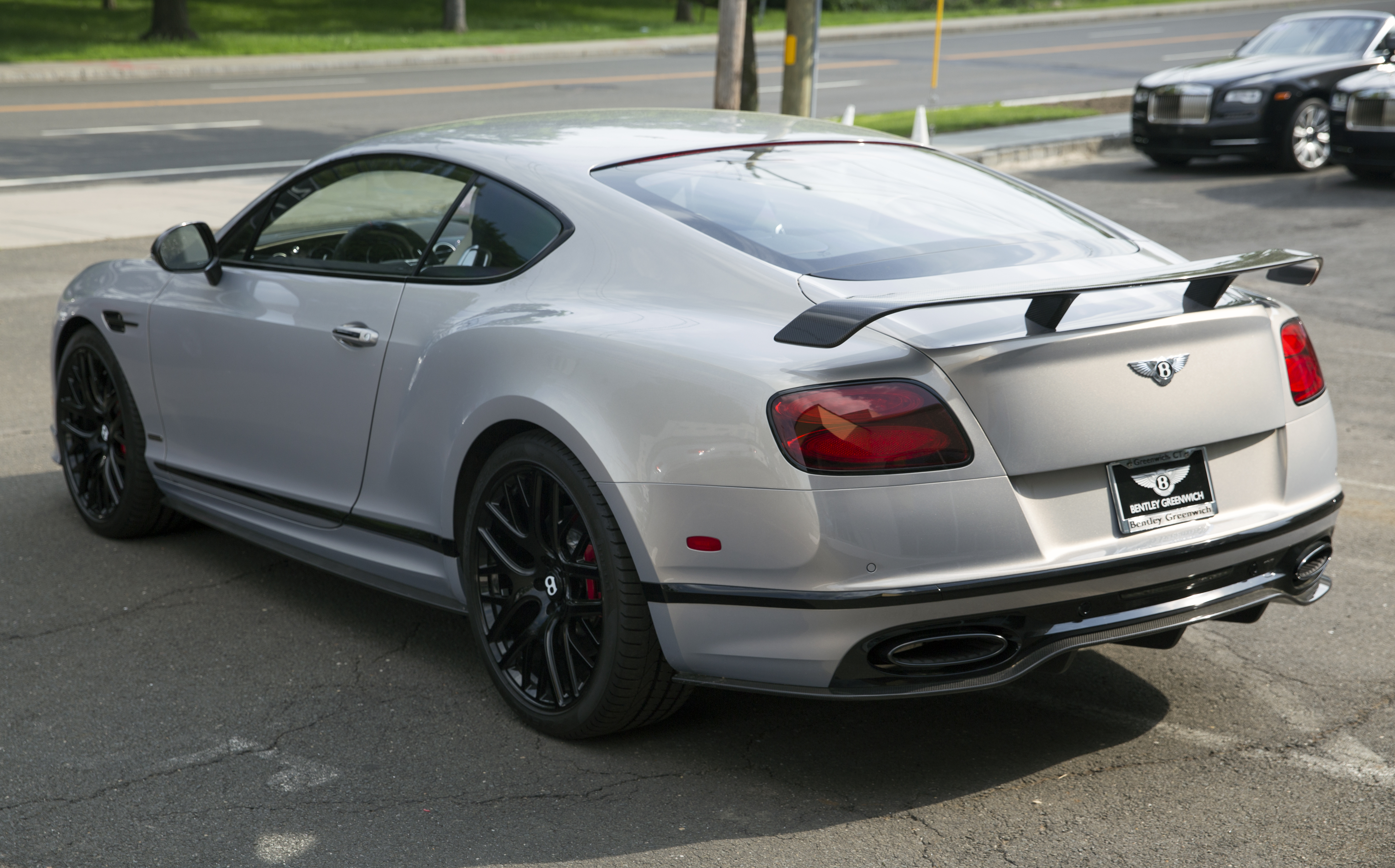
Bentley Continental Supersports rear view

Available in coupé and convertible bodies, the Continental Supersports (also available with X Specification) is a version of the Continental GT W12 with increased engine power to 710 PS (522 kW; 700 hp) at 6,000 rpm and 1,017 N⋅m (750 lb⋅ft) of torque at 2,050–4,500 rpm. It also includes a ZF 8-speed automatic with Quickshift, Block Shifting and wheel-mounted paddleshift, carbon ceramic brakes with enhanced cooling, 420 mm (17 in) front and 356 mm (14 in) rear carbon silicon carbide brake discs, 21-inch forged alloy wheels, optional titanium exhaust system, updated version of the torque vectoring system from Continental GT3-R, dynamic system brakes, lowered and stiffened dynamic suspension set-up, front and rear bumper designs incorporating a carbon-fibre splitter and diffuser respectively, new side sill extensions and bonnet vents in carbon-fibre, gloss-black front wing vents, rifled exhaust tailpipe in gloss-black, dark-tint headlamps and tail-lamps, black-finished brightware at front grilles, lights, rear bumper, door handles and window surrounds; optional aerodynamically balanced rear spoiler and front splitter combination for coupe, new Supersports badging, 21-inch forged alloy wheels in black and bright-machined finish, optional side decals optional carbon-fibre engine cover in gloss-finish with Supersports branding, multi-layer hood for convertible, neck warmer for convertible, tri-tone interior option, new diamond-quilted design at seats and door side panels with Alcantara upholstery, a choice of 11 veneers and technical finishes (including chequered Supersports carbon-fibre fascia panels), new Supersports emblem stitching, bespoke Supersports steering wheel and unique gearlever with Alcantara accents. 710 Supersports in total were built.

The X Specification includes eight unique duo-tone paint treatments and carbon-fibre door mirrors and heel plates, titanium exhaust, carbon-fibre finish to the interior side panels and carbon-fibre engine cover, a gloss black finish to the 21-inch forged wheels.

== Third generation (2018–2024) ==
Third generation
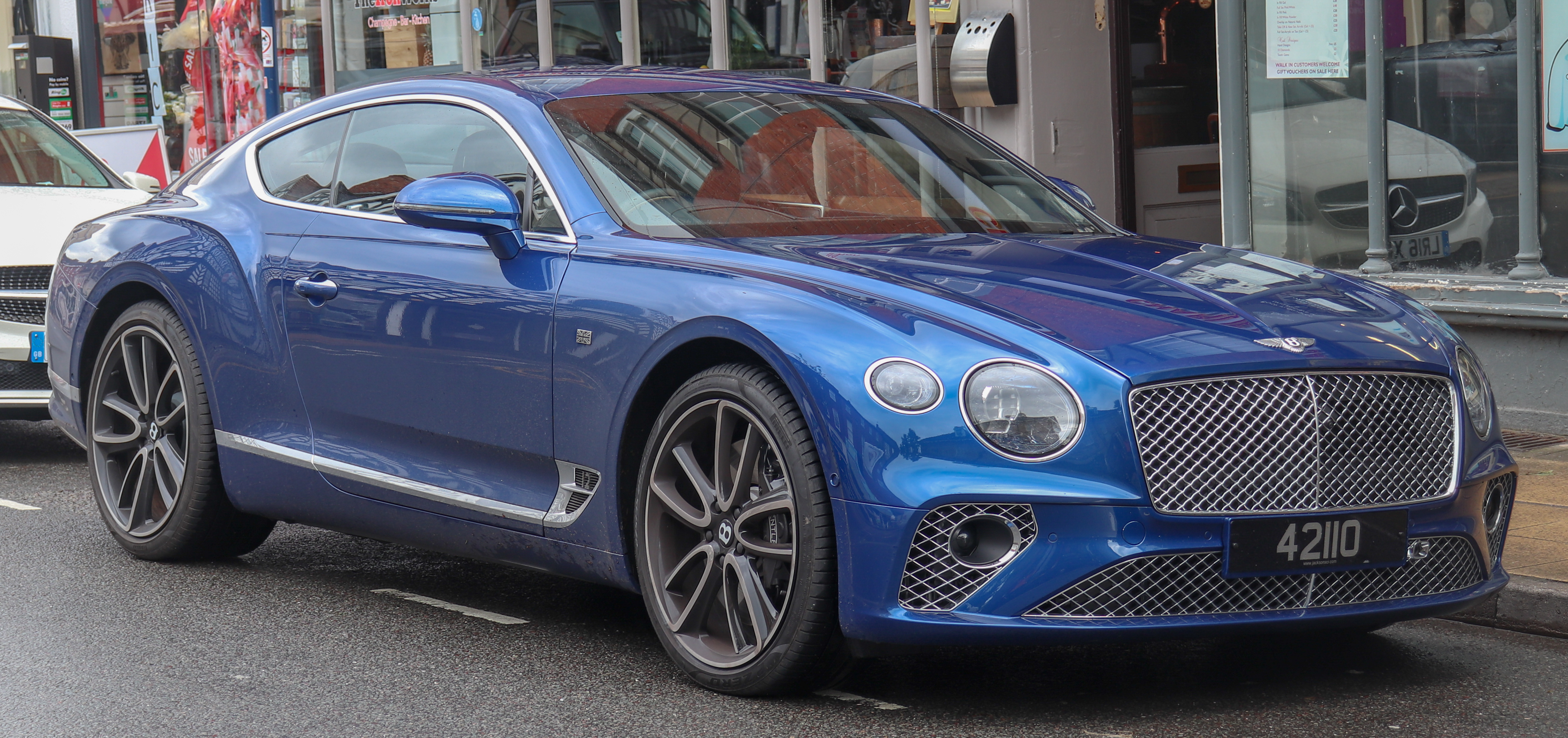

Overview
- Production: 2018–2024
- Designer: Stefan Sielaff (Design Director) John Paul Gregory (Exterior); Darren Day (Interior)

Body and chassis
- Platform: Volkswagen Group MSB platform
- Related: Bentley Flying Spur; Porsche Panamera (971); Bentley Mulliner Bacalar

Powertrain
- Engine: 6.0 L W12 twin-turbo; EA824/CND 4.0 L V8 twin-turbo
- Power output: 550 PS (542 hp; 405 kW) (CDVA); 635 PS (626 hp; 467 kW) (2018–2021); 659 PS (650 hp; 485 kW) (2021–2024)
- Transmission: 8-speed Porsche PDK dual clutch

Dimensions
- Wheelbase: 2,851 mm (112.2 in)
- Length: 4,850 mm (190.9 in)
- Width: 1,954 mm (76.9 in)
- Height: 1,405 mm (55.3 in)
- Kerb weight: 2,244 kg (4,947 lb) (W12); 2,164 kg (4,771 lb) (V8)

=== Continental GT W12 (2018–2021) ===
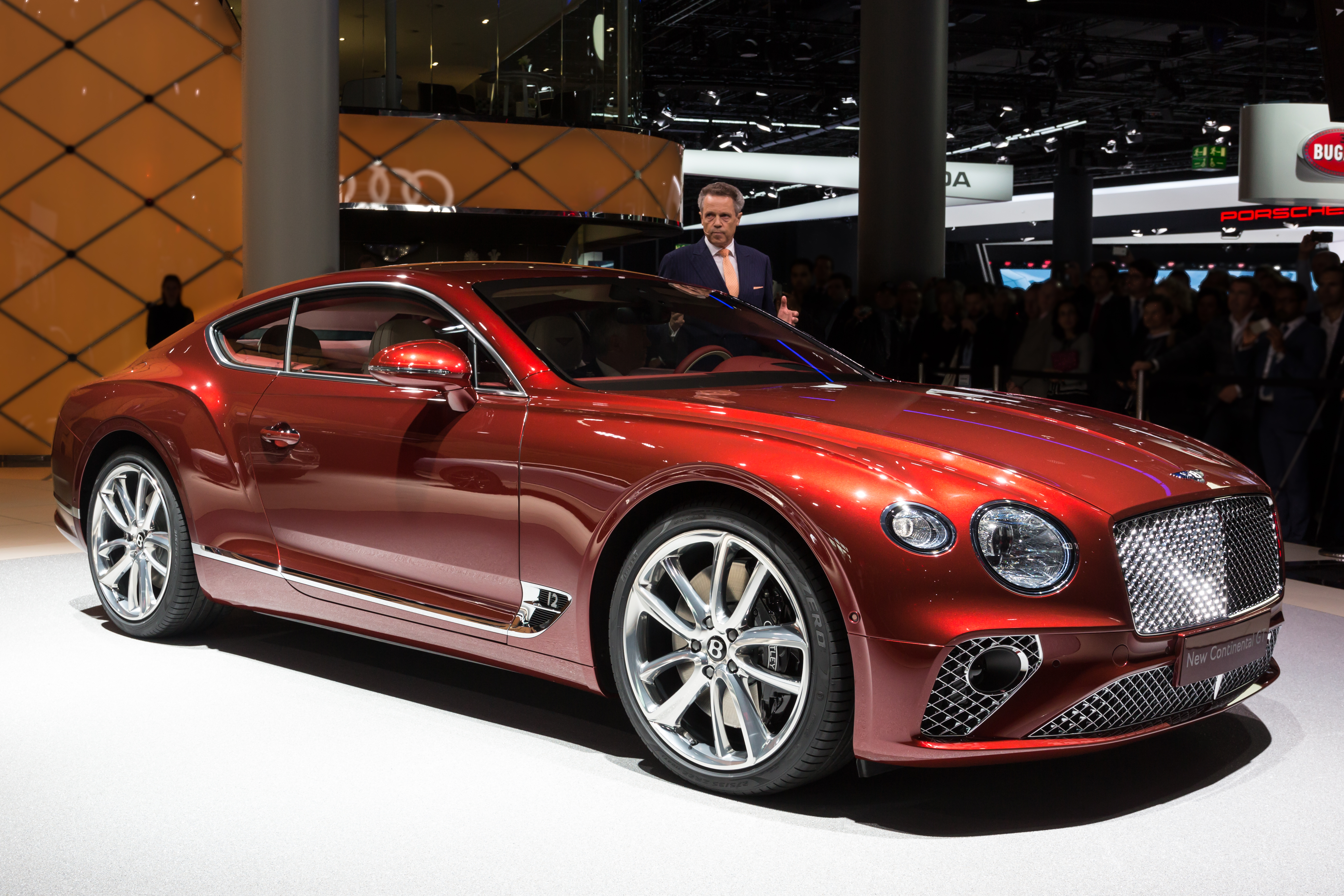
Continental GT W12 front view

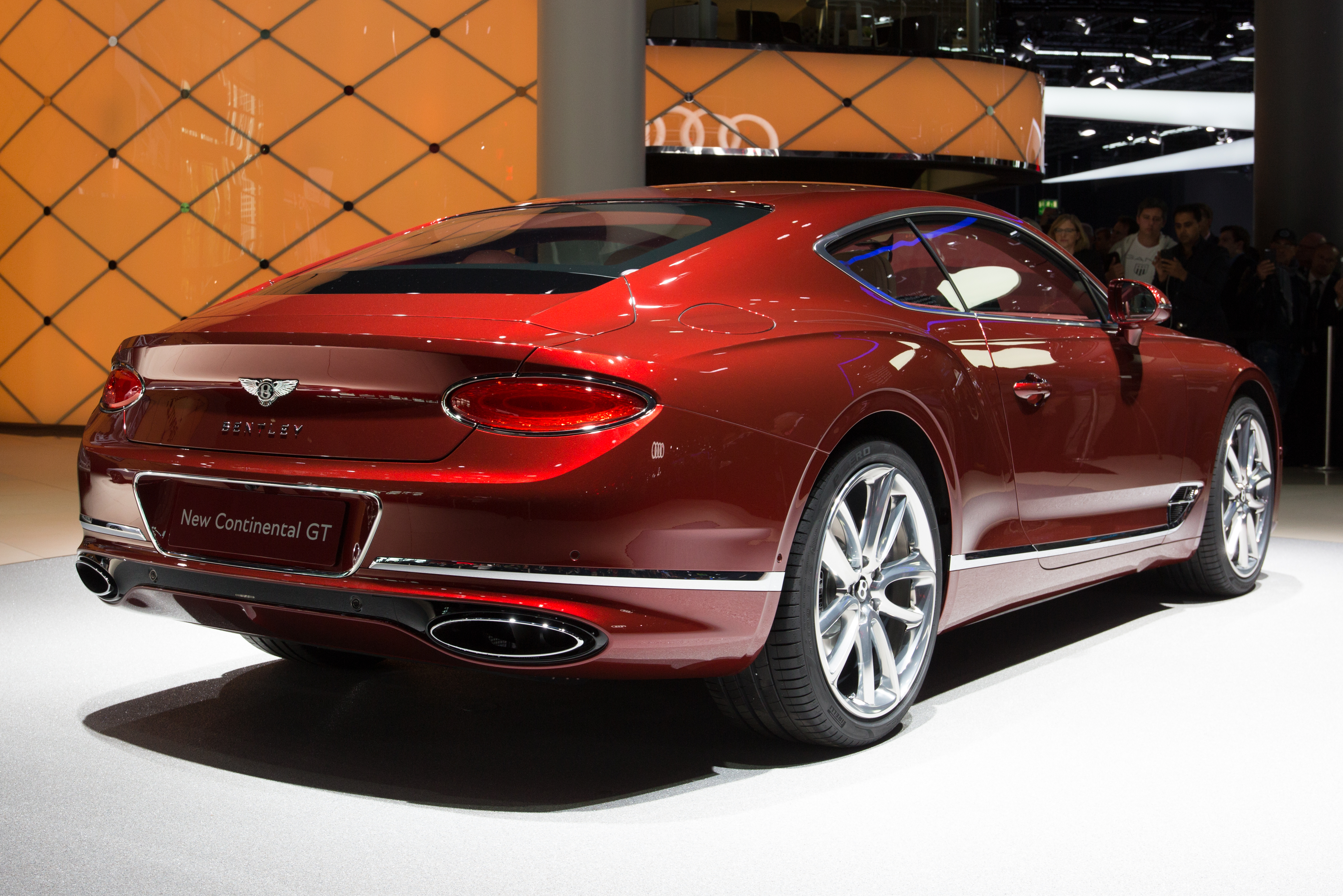
Continental GT W12 rear view

The press release announcing a third-generation Continental GT was made on 29 August 2017. The model made its physical debut when it was unveiled at the 2017 Frankfurt Motor Show where it drew a huge crowd. Production began in 2018 with a base price of £156,700. In January 2019, Bentley announced it would celebrate its 100th birthday with a limited-edition car, likely based on the Continental GT, to debut at the Geneva auto show. November 2018 saw the debut of a 2019 Bentley Continental GT Convertible, to go on sale in 2019.

The model shares the Volkswagen-developed MSB platform with the second-generation Porsche Panamera. Compared to previous models, the car features a lighter body (>80 kg (176.4 lb)), an extended wheelbase (135 mm (5.3 in)), a 48-volt roll-control system and a new 6.0-litre W12 TSI engine, as well as a significant interior overhaul including an industry first rotating display. The Continental GT is the first production car ever to have an entire body side made from the Super Formed process; a precision technique with aluminium which allows more complex, sharply defined body lines. Unlike prior models, the panels are "superformed" with heated aluminium sheets molded by gas instead of a stamp. Manufacturer's figures indicate 0–60 mph takes 3.6 seconds (3.7 seconds 0–100 km/h) and it is capable of reaching a top speed of 333 km/h (207 mph). The W12 engine – designed, developed, and handbuilt in Crewe – is a further enhanced version of the TSI engine launched in the Bentayga in 2016. Featuring high- and low- pressure direct fuel injection, a variable displacement system, stop-start technology and launch mode, the powertrain produces 635 PS (626 hp) and 900 N⋅m (664 lb⋅ft) of torque.

=== Continental GT/GTC V8 (2019–2024) ===
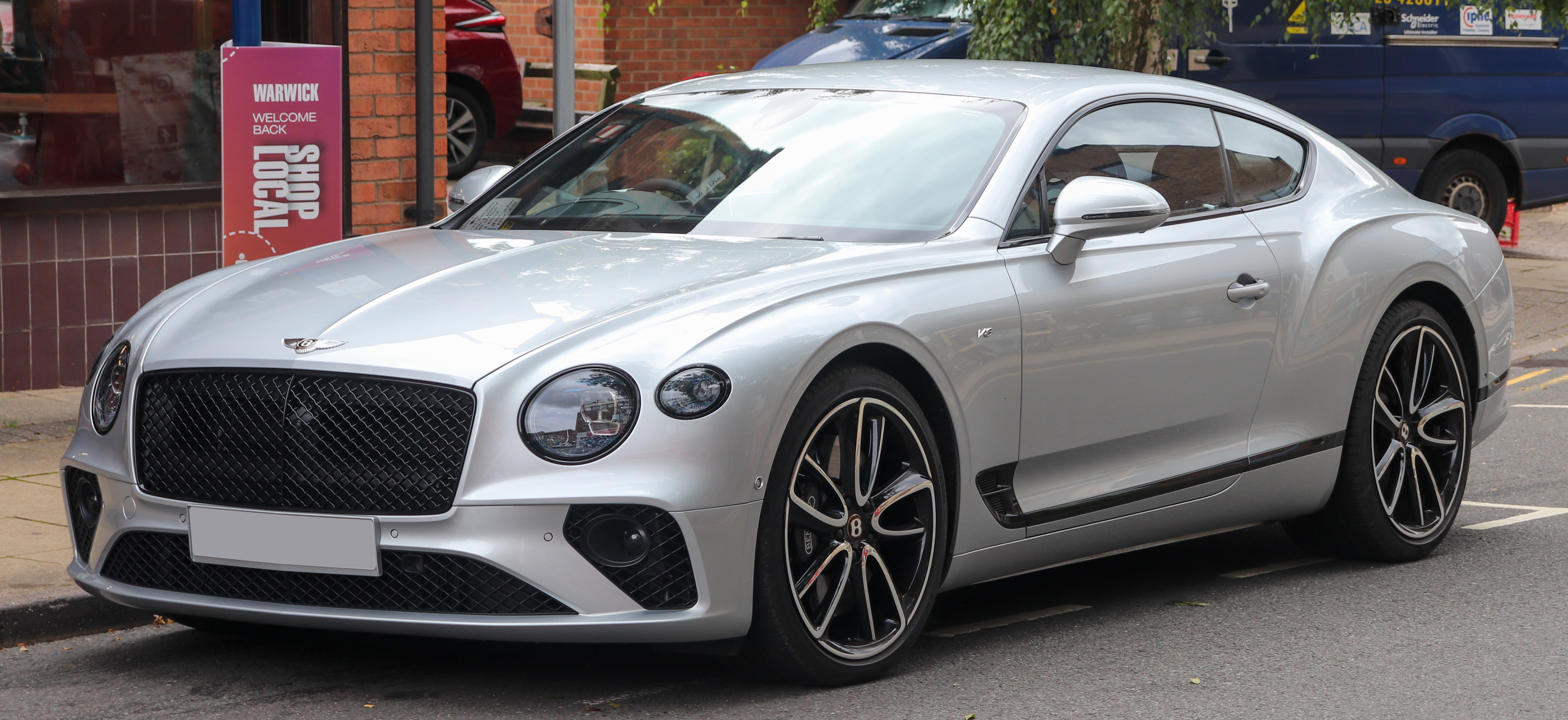
Continental GT V8 front view

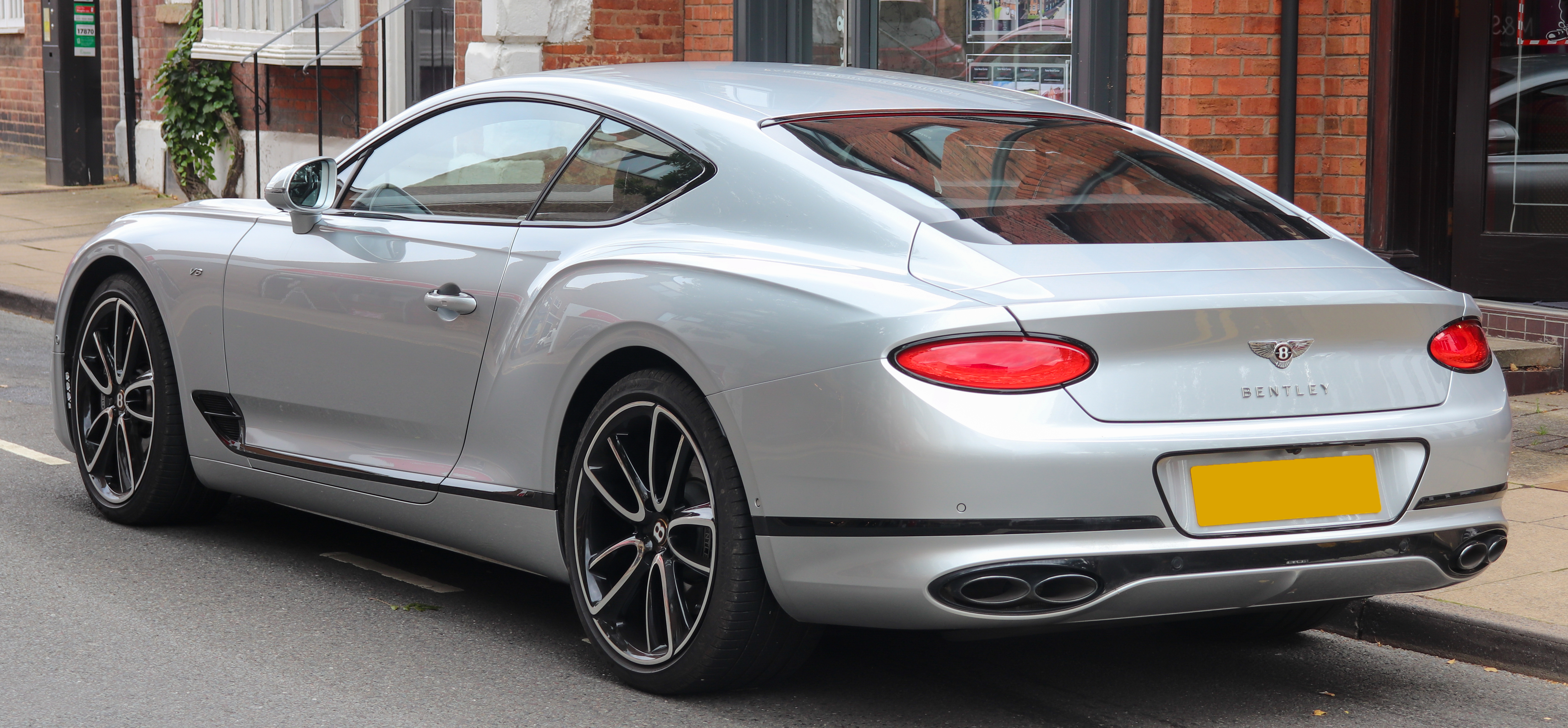
Continental GT V8 rear view

The Continental GT V8 has a 4.0L twin-turbocharged V8 that produces 550 PS (542 hp) and 770 N⋅m (568 lb⋅ft) of torque. The car can accelerate from 0-60 mph (97 km/h) in 3.9 seconds and is capable of reaching a top speed of 198 mph (319 km/h). The Continental GTC V8 is the Convertible variant of the Continental GT V8. It has a top speed of 198 mph (319 km/h) and has the ability to accelerate from 0 to 100 km/h (62 mph) in four seconds. GTC is the largest serial convertible in the world since 2023.

=== Continental GT/GTC Mulliner (2020–2024) ===
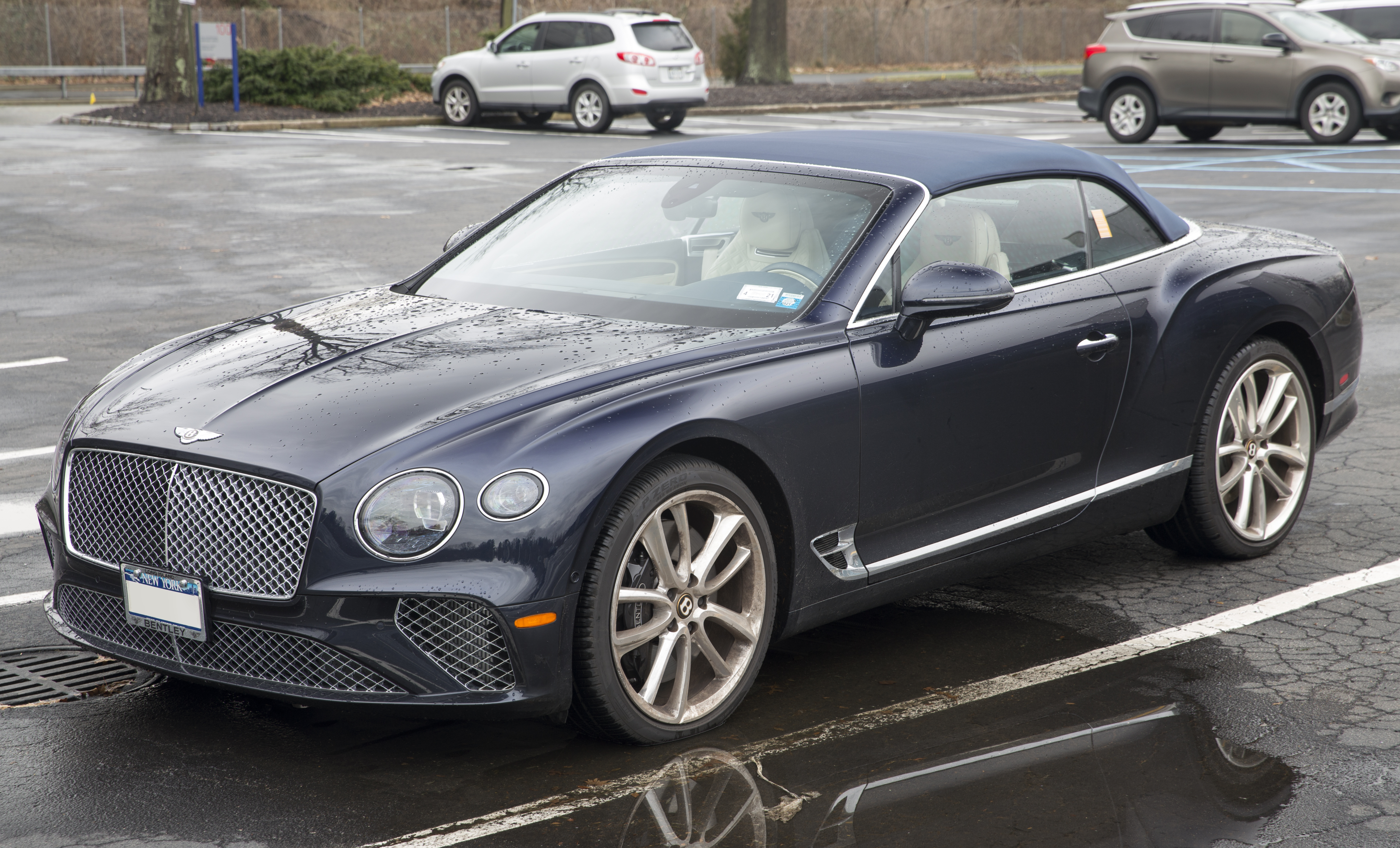
Continental GTC Mulliner

The Continental GT Mulliner is a luxury version of the Continental GT V8 which's interior features have been handcrafted. The car has the Mulliner Driving Specification and the Mulliner interior features. This car has a V8 engine identical to the Bentley Continental GT V8 and has the same capabilities. This car also has a Convertible version known as the GTC Mulliner with the same configurations as all the other models have.

=== Continental GT/GTC Speed (2021–2024) ===
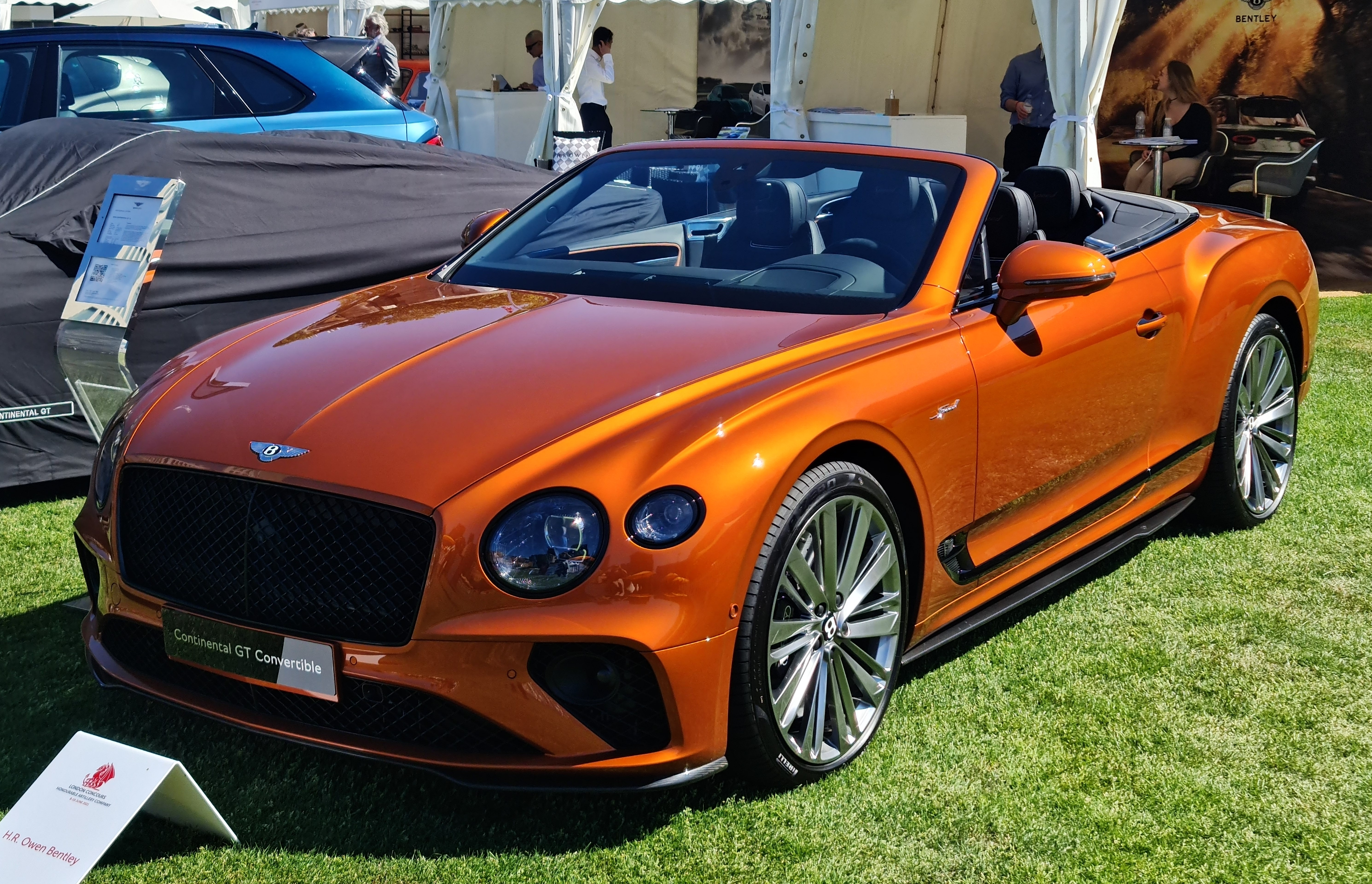
Continental GTC Speed

The Bentley Continental GT speed is a car powered by a W12 engine as the Continental GT which enables it to accelerate from 0 to 100 km/h (0 to 62 mph) in 3.5 seconds and reach a maximum speed of 208 mph (335 km/h). It also has a maximum torque of 900 N⋅m (664 lb⋅ft) and a maximum power of 659 PS (650 bhp). The interior features sporty seats and the new Bentley rotating screen. This car also has a convertible edition which has the same capabilities of the GT coupé except the acceleration capability of 0-100 km/h (62 mph) which takes 3.6 seconds.

== Fourth generation (2024–present) ==
Fourth generation
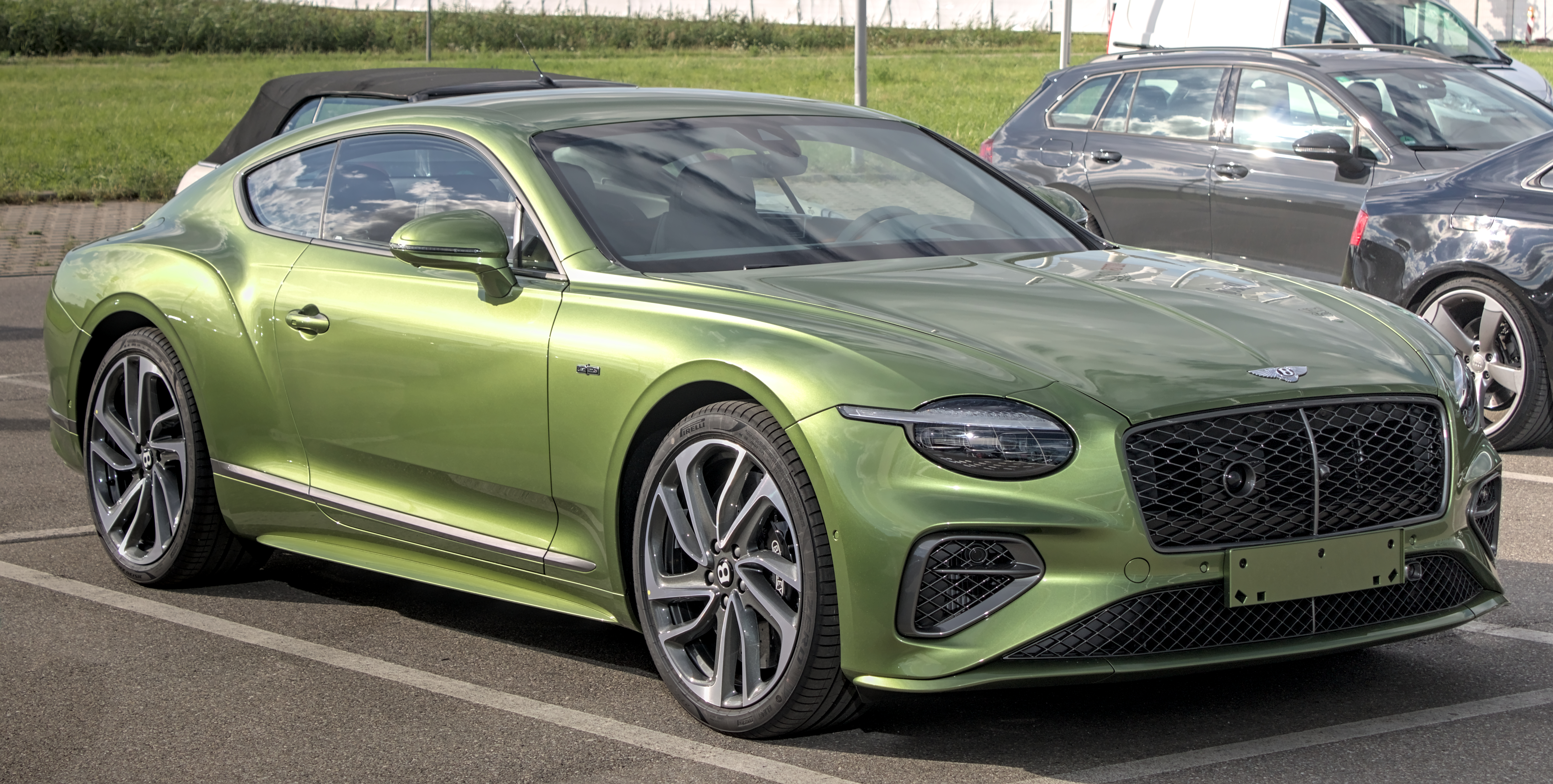

Overview
- Production: 2024–present

Body and chassis
- Platform: Volkswagen Group MSB platform
- Related: Bentley Flying Spur; Porsche Panamera (976); Bentley Mulliner Bacalar

Powertrain
- Engine: 4.0 L V8 Ultra Performance Hybrid twin-turbo; 4.0 L V8 High Performance Hybrid twin-turbo; 4.0 L V8 twin-turbo (Supersports)
- Electric motor: Permanent Magnet Syncronus motor (V8 Ultra Performance Hybrid and High Performance Hybrid)
- Power output: 782 PS (771 hp; 575 kW); 680 PS (671 hp; 500 kW); 666 PS (657 hp; 490 kW) (Supersports)
- Transmission: 8-speed Porsche PDK dual clutch
- Hybrid drivetrain: PHEV (Ultra performance and high performance V8 PHEV)

Dimensions
- Wheelbase: 2,851 mm (112.2 in)
- Length: 4,895 mm (192.7 in)
- Width: 2,187 mm (86.1 in)
- Height: 1,397 mm (55.0 in)
- Kerb weight: 2,459 kg (5,421 lb)

=== Continental GT/GTC Speed (2024–present) ===
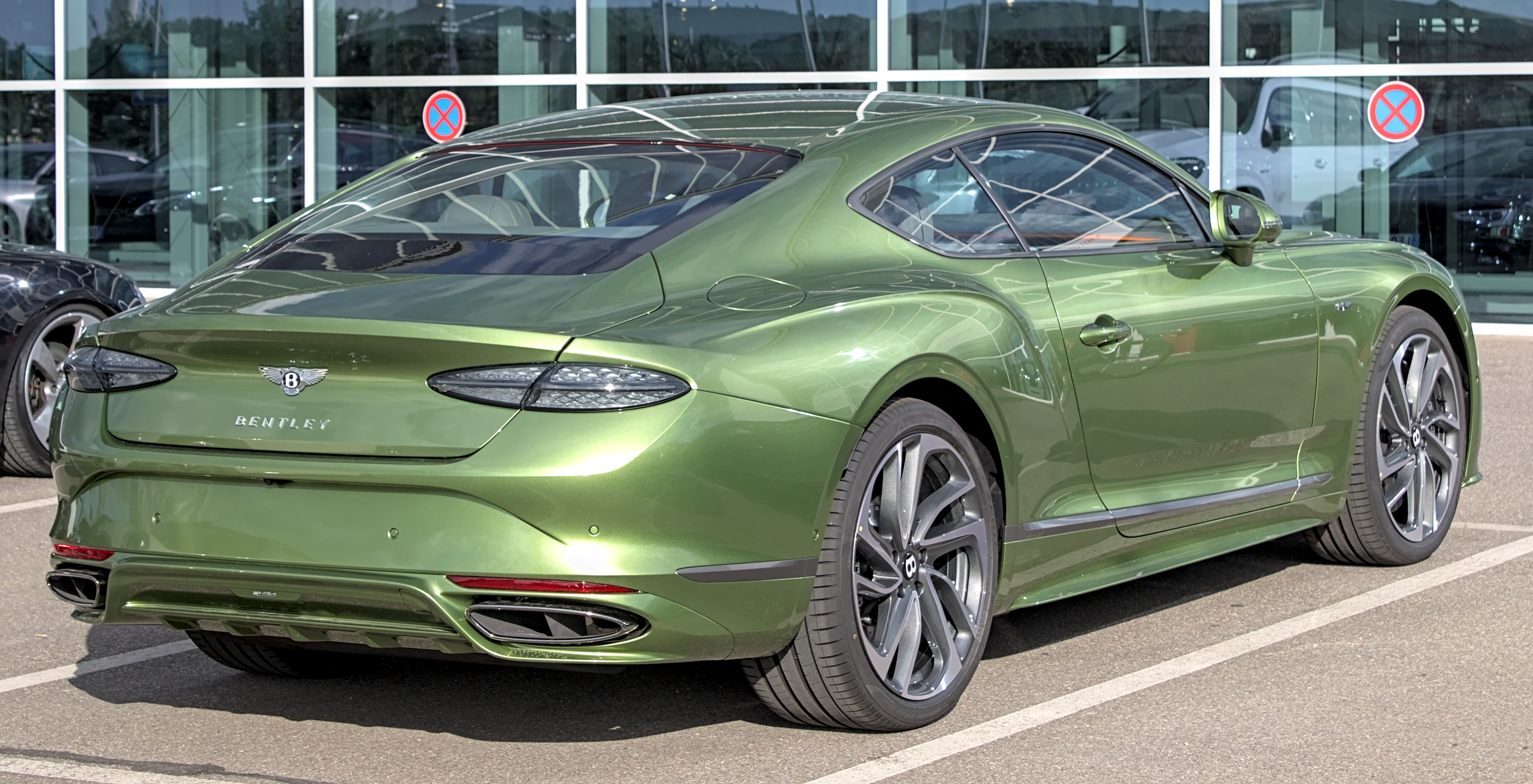
Rear view

The press release for the 2025 Continental GT was made on 25 June 2024, following several weeks of media previews with the model's prototype. The fourth generation Continental was introduced with the top range Speed specification which made its public debut at the 2024 Goodwood Festival of Speed.

The fourth generation GT Speed is powered by a twin-turbo Ultra Performance Hybrid V8 engine, replacing the outgoing W12 engine which ceased production in mid-2024. Capable of generating a maximum power of 782 PS (771 bhp) and a maximum torque of 1,000 N⋅m (738 lb⋅ft), the new hybrid engine enables the car to accelerate from 0 to 100 km/h (0 to 62 mph) in 3.2 seconds. Retaining the exterior look and the Porsche Panamera platform of the third generation Continental GT, the fourth generation model has been slightly restyled with features adopted from the Bentley Mulliner Bacalar and Mulliner Batur concept cars. This includes the introduction of new headlights, making the model the first Bentley to have a single-headlight setup since the 1959 Bentley S2. At 2,459 kilograms (5,421 lb), the car is also heavier than the third generation model; this owes to the 25.9 kWh battery mounted behind the rear axle which contributes to the fourth generation's 49:51 weight distribution. Manufacturer figures indicate an electric-only range of 81 kilometres (50 mi) from the plug-in battery alone.

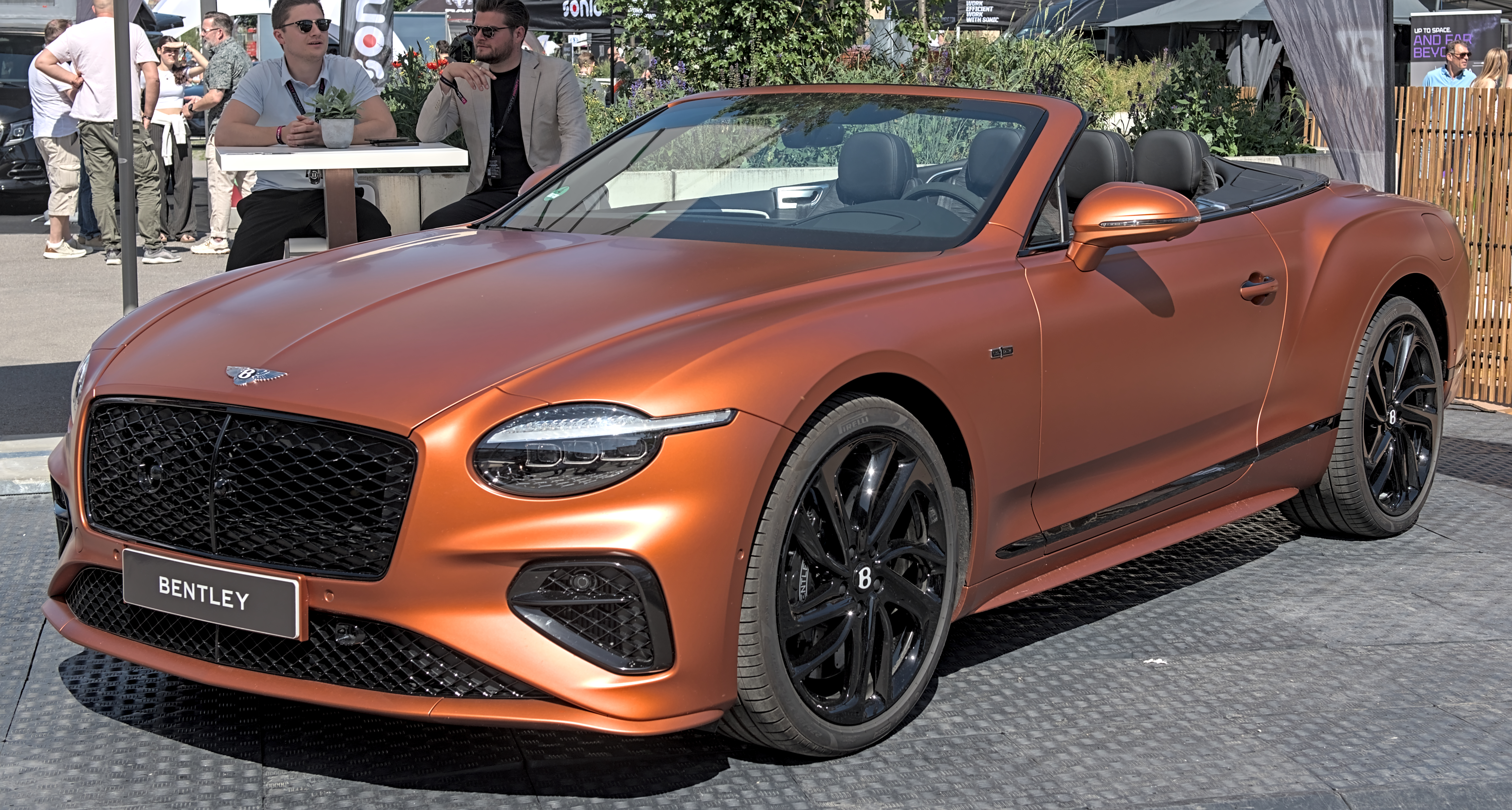
GTC (Front view)

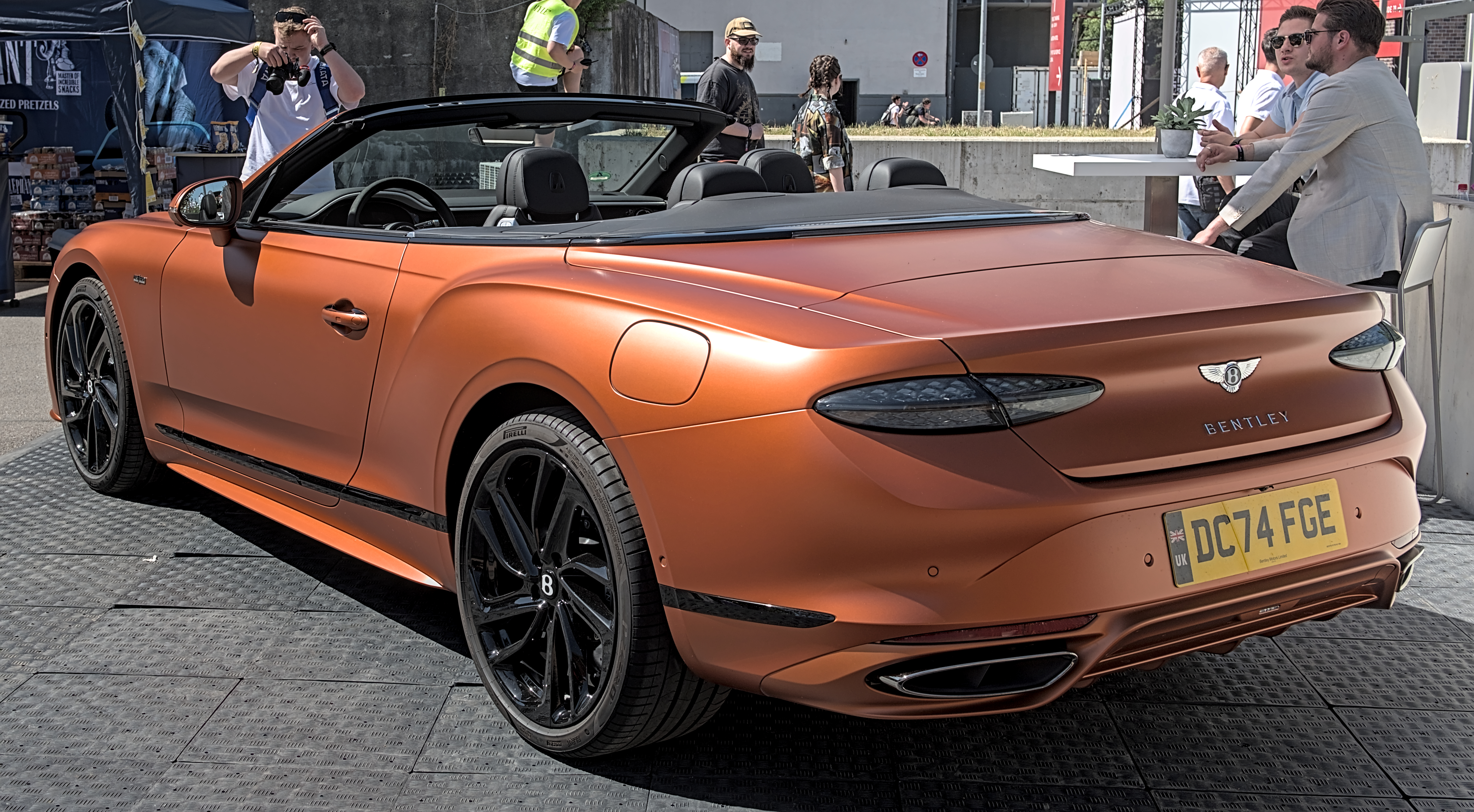
Rear view

=== Continental GT/GTC Mulliner (2024–present) ===
Unveiled on October 1, 2024, alongside the Flying Spur Mulliner, the Continental GT Mulliner is the range topping version of the Continental GT. The GT Mulliner is powered by the same Ultra Performance Hybrid V8 engine as the GT Speed, featuring new crystal cut headlamps and red taillights distinct from the Speed version. The unveiling also includes the debut of a new 'floating diamond' grille, as well as welcome animation lights, two-toned side-view mirrors, and interior options, only exclusive to Mulliner Bentley models.

=== Continental GT/GTC (2025–present) ===
Introduced alongside the GT Azure, the base model Continental GT was unveiled on April 8, 2025. The model marks the introduction of a new twin-turbo High Performance Hybrid V8 engine, a derated version of the Ultra Performance Hybrid V8 found on the Speed and Mulliner versions of the car. Capable of generating a maximum power output of 680 PS (671 bhp) and a maximum torque of 930 N⋅m (686 lb⋅ft), the new engine option allows the car to accelerate from 0 to 100 km/h (0 to 62 mph) in 3.5 seconds.

=== Continental GT/GTC Azure (2025–present) ===
Featuring the same engine and drivetrain as the base Continental GT, the GT Azure features a new contrasting black grille with a vertical chrome surround. Unveiled alongside a Flying Spur Azure counterpart, the car introduces new exterior and interior design options, exclusive to the range.

=== Continental Supersports (2026–present) ===
The Supersports name returned for the fourth generation after 9 years, skipping the third generation Continental. For this model, it excludes the hybrid powertrain from the 4.0-litre twin-turbo V8 powering the rear wheels, producing 666 PS (657 bhp) and 800 N⋅m (590 lb⋅ft), which is less powerful than the Speed variant. It is also by far the lightest production Bentley ever built, weighing at 1,998 kg (4,405 lb). This allows the car to accelerate from 0 to 100 km/h (0 to 62 mph) in 3.6 seconds, and reaches a top speed of 310 km/h (193 mph). As standard, it comes with carbon ceramic brakes alongside a set of 22" lightweight forged rims and full-length titanium exhaust system, developed in conjunction with Manthey Racing and Akrapovič, respectively. 500 units will be made globally.

== Special editions ==
=== Continental GT Diamond Series (2007) ===
The Continental GT Diamond Series is a limited (400 units worldwide) version of the 2007 model year Continental GT Mulliner Driving Specification, commemorating the Crewe factory's 60th anniversary. It includes carbon-silicon carbide brakes (420x40mm cross-drilled front and 356x28mm rear), exclusive 9Jx20-inch 14-spoke alloy wheels, choice of 3 additional exclusive body colours (Moroccan Blue (bright blue), Anthracite (grey black) and Meteor (steel blue grey)), unique insignia to exterior, unique treadplates with the text 'Celebrating 60 years of manufacturing in Crewe', choice of upgraded veneers (Dark Stained Burr Walnut or Piano Black (additional veneers available at extra cost)), drilled alloy sport foot pedals, gear lever finished in knurled chrome and hide, diamond quilted hide to seat facings, door and rear quarter panels; embroidered Bentley emblem to seat facings, indented hide headlining and a Mulliner alloy fuel filler cap.

=== Continental GTC, GTC Speed 80-11 Editions (2010) ===
The 80-11 models are limited (80 units per model) versions of the Continental GTC and GTC Speed for the North American market. They feature 20-inch 14-spoke alloy diamond wheels polished with unique black center caps featuring Bentley 'B' emblem (GTC) or 20-inch wheels from Supersports finished in dark tint with red brake calipers (GTC Speed) as well as Union Jack brightware badges on the front wings, exclusive Midnight body colour option, Dark Grey Metallic soft top and the Mulliner fuel-filler cap as standard, Beluga main leather hide with white (GTC) or Pillar Box Red (GTC Speed) contrast stitching and piping and Bentley emblems, Piano Black veneers, engine-turned aluminium with bright (GTC) or dark (GTC Speed) finish, drilled alloy sport foot pedals, treadplates and a badge on the console with the '80-11 Edition' signature. The vehicle was unveiled at the 2010 Pebble Beach Concours d'Elegance, and arrived at Bentley dealers in the Autumn of 2010 as 2011 model year vehicles.

=== Continental GT Design Series China (2010) ===
The Continental GT Design Series China is a version of the Continental GT for the Chinese market. It features a three-tone interior that blends a main leather hide colour with accent and insert colours as well as a choice of Orange and Magenta accent colours, choice of Orange Flame and Magenta Metallic body colours, Piano Black and dark-stained Burr Walnut veneer (or optional Amboyna), exterior wing badge and a treadplate and name badge positioned on the centre console that says 'Design Series China'.

The vehicle was unveiled at the 2010 Auto China Motor Show in Beijing.

=== Continental Supersports Convertible ISR (2011) ===
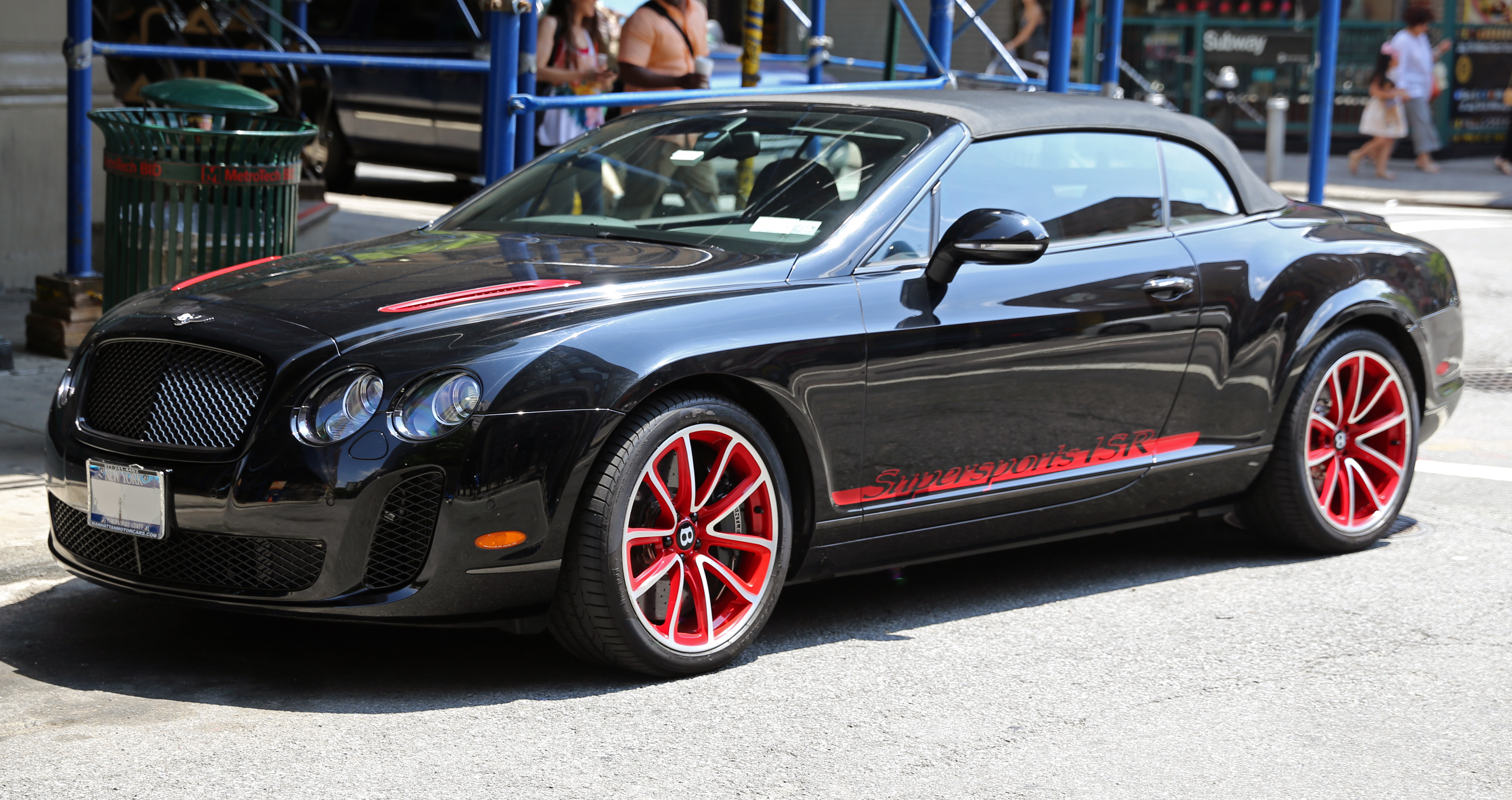
2012 Supersports ISR front view

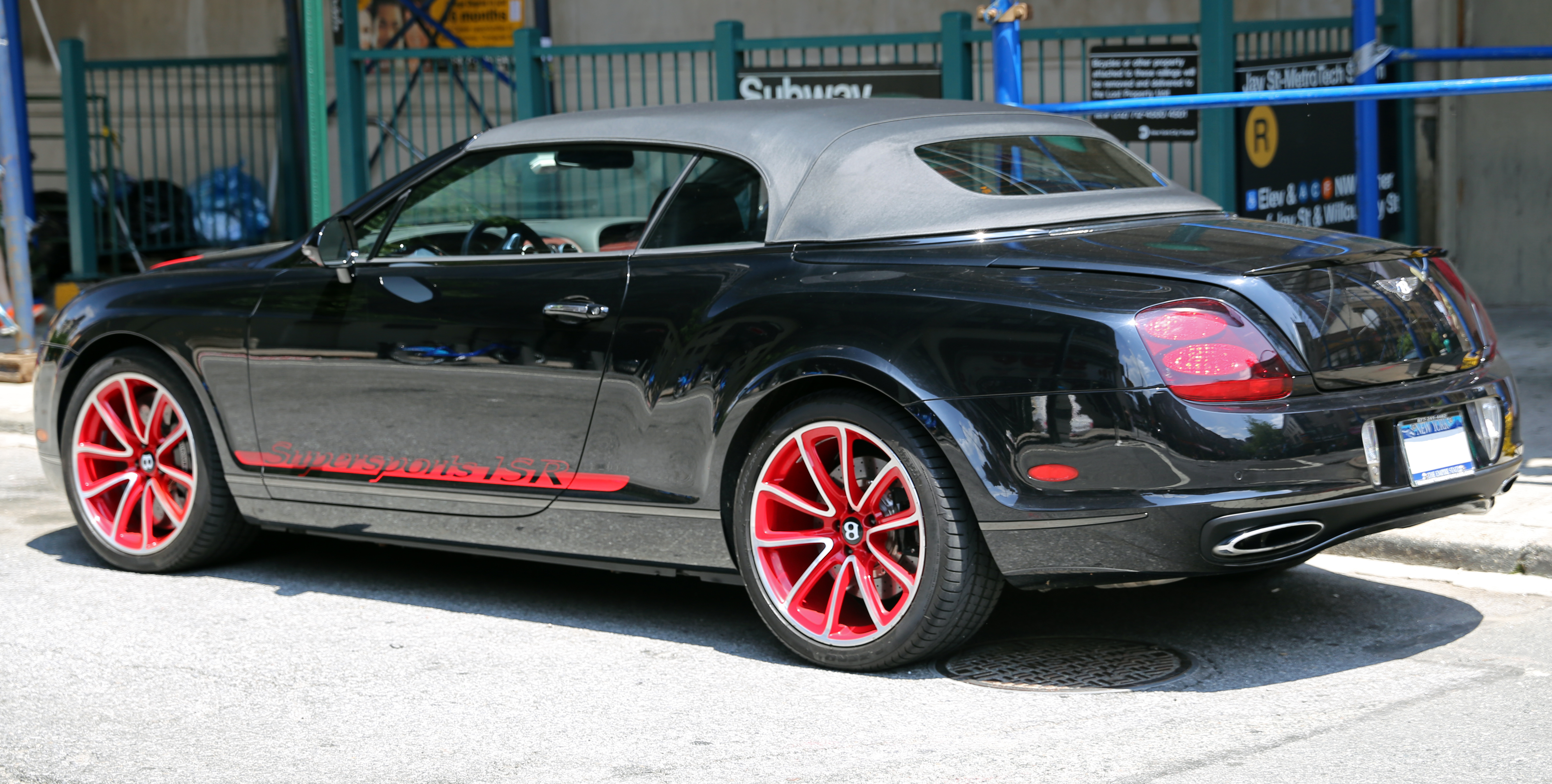
2012 Supersports ISR rear view

The Bentley Continental Supersports Convertible ISR (Ice Speed Record) is a limited (100 units) version of the Bentley Continental Supersports convertible, commemorating Bentley's world ice speed record set by Finland's four-time world rally champion Juha Kankkunen. It includes a W12 engine rated at 640 PS (471 kW; 631 bhp), Quickshift six-speed automatic transmission, 420 mm front and 356 mm rear diameter carbon ceramic brake discs with eight-piston front calipers, three body colours (Beluga, Quartzite, Arctica White) with Dark Grey Metallic soft top in three-ply composite construction, 20-inch 10-spoke Supersports wheels in dark tint. The interior has leather upholstery, diamond-quilted Alcantara to doors and quarter panels and seat facings, 'soft-grip' leather on the steering wheel and gear lever, high-gloss carbon fibre on the dashboard and console and roof panel with unique red weave, Pillar Box red piping to seats and doors, Pillar Box Red contrast stitching to seats, door casings, steering wheel and gearshift paddles; front seats and floor mats with embroidered 'Supersports' legends, and a Breitling dashboard clock with red accent.

The vehicle was unveiled at the 2011 Geneva Motor Show.

=== Continental GT Le Mans Edition (2013) ===
The Continental GT Le Mans Editions are limited (48 units per model) versions of the Continental GT V8 coupe and convertible, GT W12 coupé and convertible, and GT Speed coupé. They are built for the North American market to commemorate Bentley's six victories at the 24 Hours of Le Mans. Each car includes a unique Le Mans Edition numbered badge, Le Mans Edition clock face, embroidered Le Mans badge to each headrest, tread plates with the limited edition name, unique Le Mans Edition wheels and specific interior veneers and exterior colours. The vehicles were made in 6 models, named after the winning drivers:

| Model | Exterior | Interior | Stitching | Veneer |
|---|---|---|---|---|
| John Duff | Moonbeam | Two-tone Linen and Beluga | Contrast | Piano Black and Bright Aluminium |
| Dudley Benjafield | Verdant | Two-tone Linen and Cumbrian Green | Contrast | Dark Stain Burr Walnut and Bright Aluminium |
| Woolf Barnato | Granite | Hotspur | Beluga | Carbon Fibre |
| Tim Birkin | Glacier White | Beluga | White | Piano Black and Bright Aluminium |
| Glen Kidston | Dark Sapphire, with Blue hued exterior roof on GT Convertible models | Two-tone Newmarket Tan and Imperial Blue | Contrast | Dark Stain Burr Walnut and Dark Aluminium |
| Guy Smith | Beluga | Beluga | Hotspur | Piano Black and Dark Aluminium |

The vehicles went on sale in the second quarter of 2013.

=== Continental GT3-R (2014–2015) ===
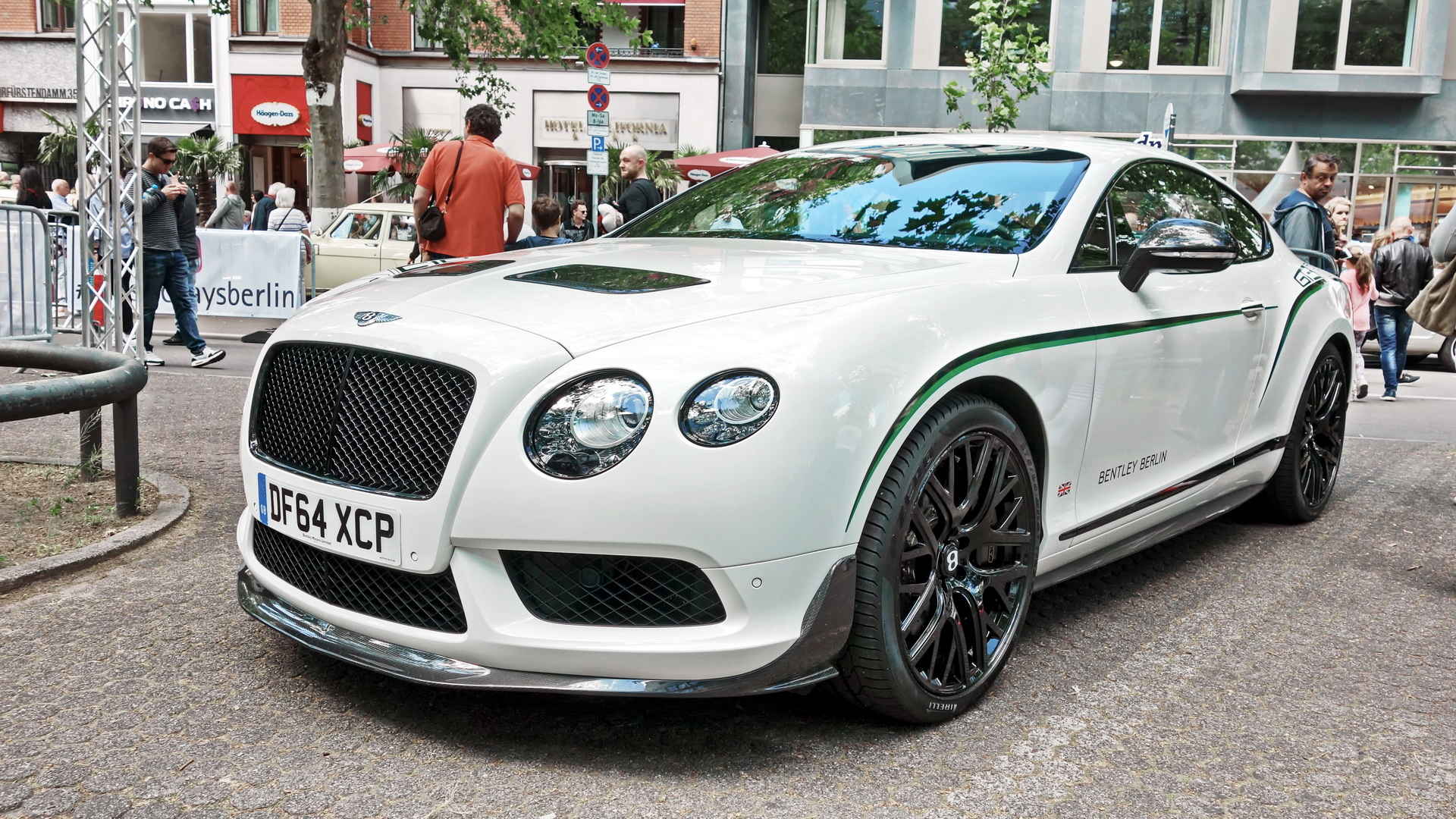
Bentley Continental GT3-R front view

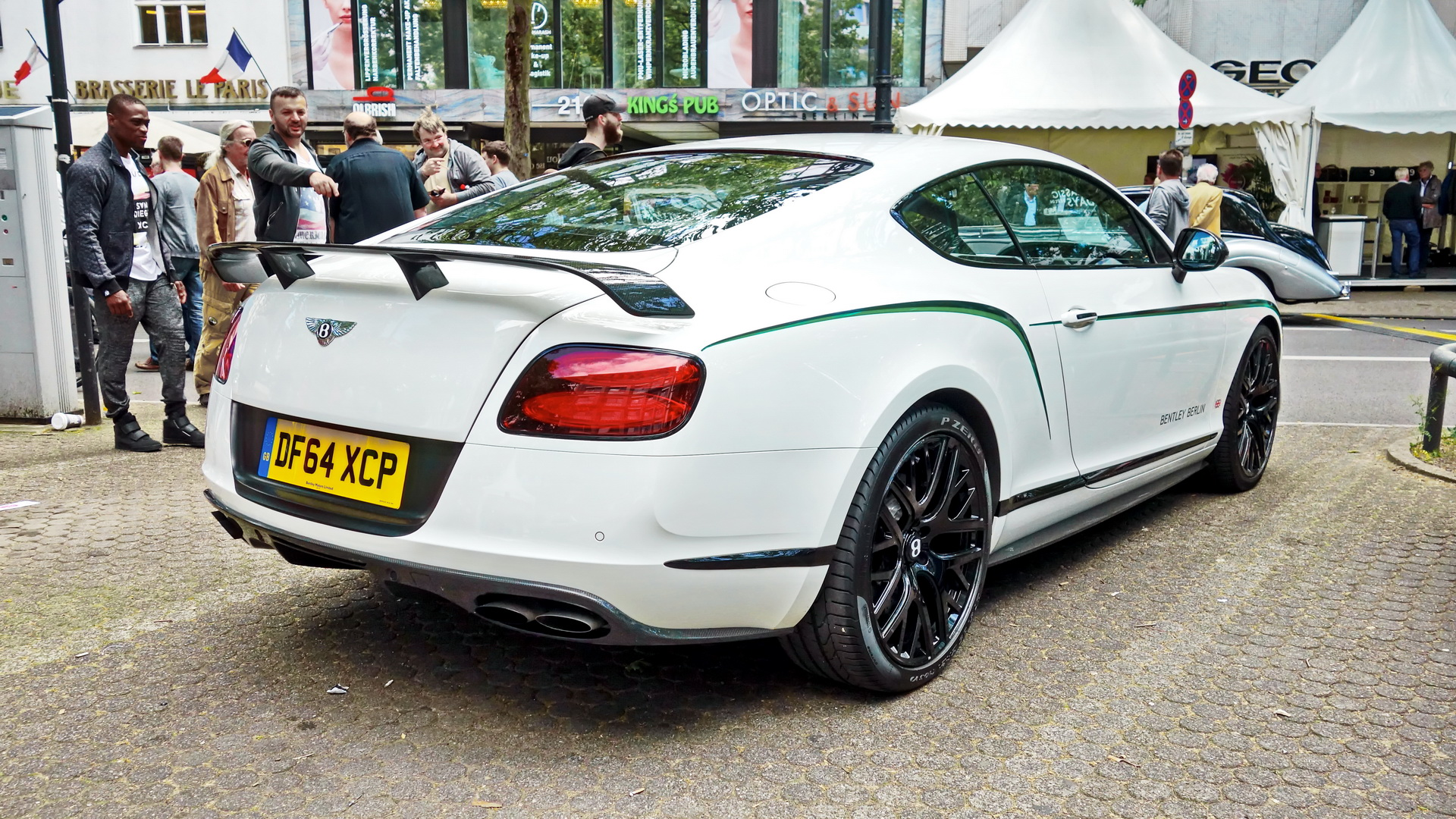
Bentley Continental GT3-R rear view

The Continental GT3-R is a limited (300 units, including 99 in US, 4 in Canada) version of the Continental GT V8 S coupe inspired by the Continental GT3 race car. It features 100 kg (220 lb) weight reduction, increased engine power to 580 PS (427 kW; 572 hp) at 6,000 rpm and 700 N⋅m (516 lb⋅ft) of torque at 1,700 rpm. Other changes include torque vectoring for each of the rear wheels, shorter gearing, recalibrated control software, all-new titanium exhaust with 7-kilogram (15 lb) weight saving and retuned acoustics, forged 21-inch alloy wheels in gloss black, Pirelli tyres, sport-focused Electronic Stability Control programme, Carbon Silicon Carbide (CSiC) braking system (420 mm front and 356 mm rear brake discs, 8-piston front calipers in green), two-seat cabin with carbon fibre, Alcantara and leather interior upholstery; bespoke sport seats with additional side support through deeper bolsters upholstered in Beluga black leather and diamond-quilted Alcantara, upholstered steering wheel and gear shifter, centre console and fascia panels in carbon fibre, carbon fibre door casings with diamond-quilted Alcantara inner panels, rear cabin with a carbon fibre surround and upholstered in leather and Alcantara, green hide colour on the seats, instrument panel, door panels, contrast stitching throughout the seats and diamond-quilted areas; GT3-R badging on the centre console, passenger-side fascia panel, sill treadplates; GT3-R stitching at seat headrests in with contrast-green stitching, carbon fibre fixed rear wing and boot lid, bonnet with two vents, Glacier White body colour with gloss carbon fibre contrasts, two-tone green graphics tracing two power lines to the side profile of the car (one leading backwards from the front wheel, the other tracing the shape of the Continental GT's rear haunch), headlamp bezels, matrix grille, window surrounds and bumper strips in gloss black. US models also included sequentially numbered GT3-R sill treadplates.

The vehicle was unveiled at the 2014 Pebble Beach Concours d'Elegance.

Delivery was set to begin late in 2014. Purchase of the car also included free standard servicing for four years (at the 10,000,-20,000-and-30,000-mile [16,000, 32,000 and 48,000 km] marks). In 2015, journalists made a GT3-R go 0–60 mph (0–97 km/h) in 3.3 seconds.

The US model went on sale for US$337,000, with deliveries to the Americas Region starting at the first quarter of 2015.

=== "Monster by Mulliner" Continental GT V8 S (2016) ===
The "Monster by Mulliner" Continental GT V8 S is a version of the Continental GT V8 S coupe built by the Mulliner bespoke coach-building division. It features 16 3400-watt Monster speakers tuned by Head Monster Noel Lee, red and black interior colour scheme, Hotspur Continental GT V8 S Beluga hide, 3D laser-etched fascia panel in Piano Black, "Always Lead, Never Follow™" and "Monster by Mulliner" headrest embroidery, Onyx body colour, Hotspur accents including a unique body kit and radiator shell bezel, red brake calipers, a gloss black polished wheel, black bonnet vents, GT Design Seats by Mulliner and 24K gold wireless headphones in a special compartment.

The vehicle was unveiled at the Consumer Electronics Show in 2016.

=== Continental GT Speed Coupé, Convertible and Black Edition (2016–2018) ===
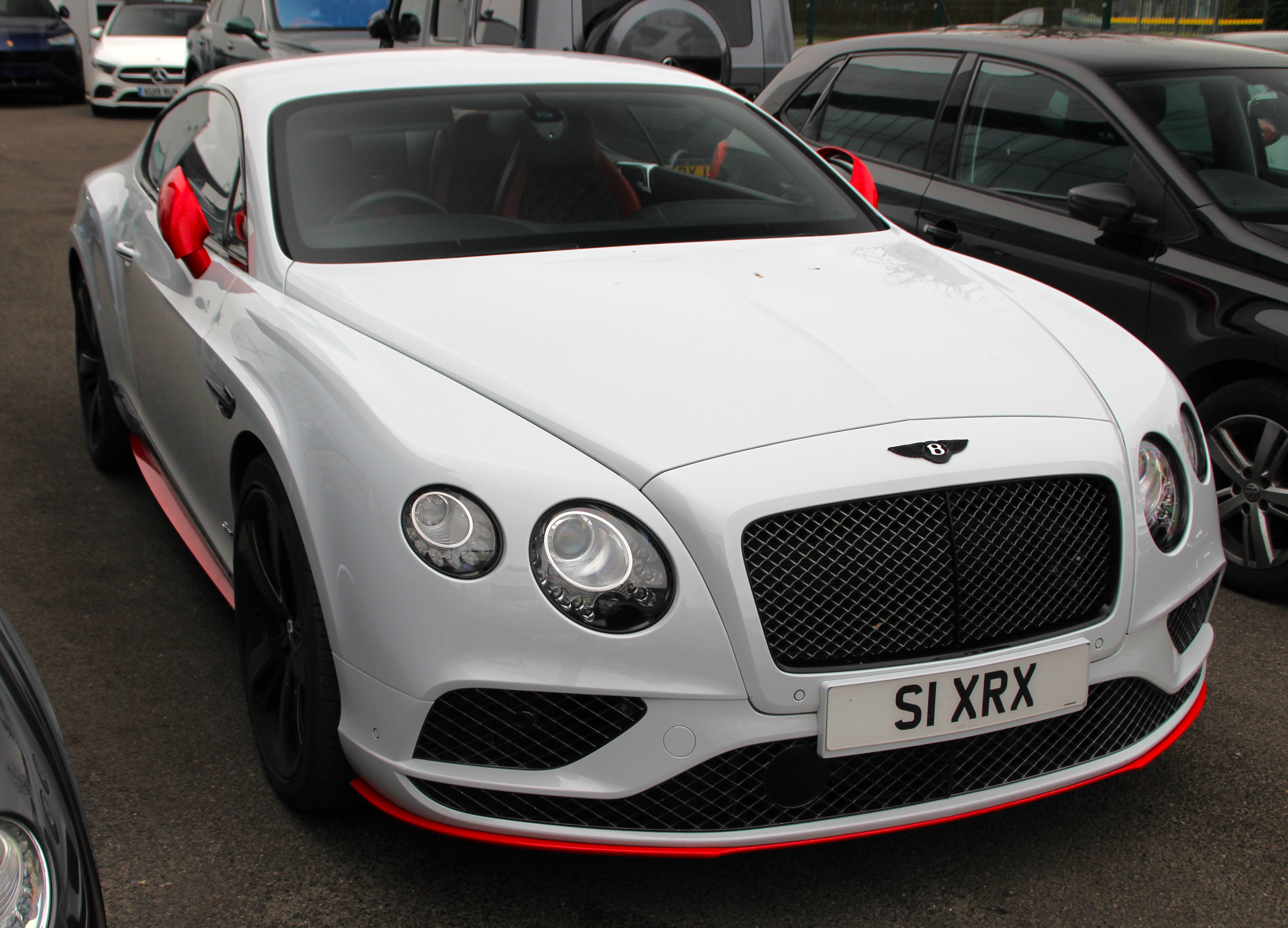
2016 Bentley Continental GT Speed

Changes to the Continental GT Speed include an increased top speed to 331 km/h (206 mph), increased engine power to 642 PS (472 kW; 633 hp) and 840 N⋅m (620 lb⋅ft) of torque at 2,000–5,000 rpm as well as carbon fibre on the fascia, centre and roof consoles.

The GT Speed Black Edition also includes a high gloss black finish to the exterior brightware (including window openings and lamp bezels), all-black 21-inch five-spoke directional wheels, brake calipers in red or black, contrast colours to the front splitter, side skirts and rear diffuser in four different shades (Hallmark, Beluga, St James' Red, Cyber Yellow), optional door mirrors colour-matching, seats and centre console bordered by contrasting leather in Porpoise, Beluga, Pillar Box Red or Cyber Yellow; contrast stitching at seats and centre console matching diamond quilting of the doors and Mulliner GT Design seats.

The vehicles were unveiled in New York City, followed by the 2016 Goodwood Festival of Speed (GT Speed) and the 2016 Pebble Beach Concours d'Elegance (GT Speed Black Edition).

Delivery began in summer 2016.

US models went on sale as 2017 model year vehicles, with deliveries began at summer 2016.

=== Pop art Bentley Continental GT V8 S Convertible (2016) ===
The Pop art Bentley Continental GT V8 S Convertible is a one-off version of the Continental GT V8 S Convertible designed by Sir Peter Blake and Mulliner. It features St Luke's Blue body colour on the rear haunches, doors and boot lid; British Racing Green lower body, Fuchsia pink-coloured radiator shell, black exterior brightware and a black hood, each seat trimmed in a different hide colour (Cumbrian Green, Imperial Blue, Newmarket Tan and Hotspur), steering wheel with a Hotspur outer rim, Newmarket Tan inner rim and Cumbrian Green centre, Imperial Blue stitching; pink leather gear lever, centre console, dashboard and interior door panels veneered in Piano Black; Sir Peter's signature at fascia panel and embroidered on all four seat headrests, unique storage cases with Piano Black veneer outer lining and Continental Yellow and St James Red internal linings, treadplate with text 'No. 1 of 1'.

The vehicle was sold in 2016 at the Goodwood Festival of Speed auction by Bonhams on 2016-06-24, with funds raised to be donated to Care2Save Charitable Trust.

=== Mulliner Bacalar (2021) ===
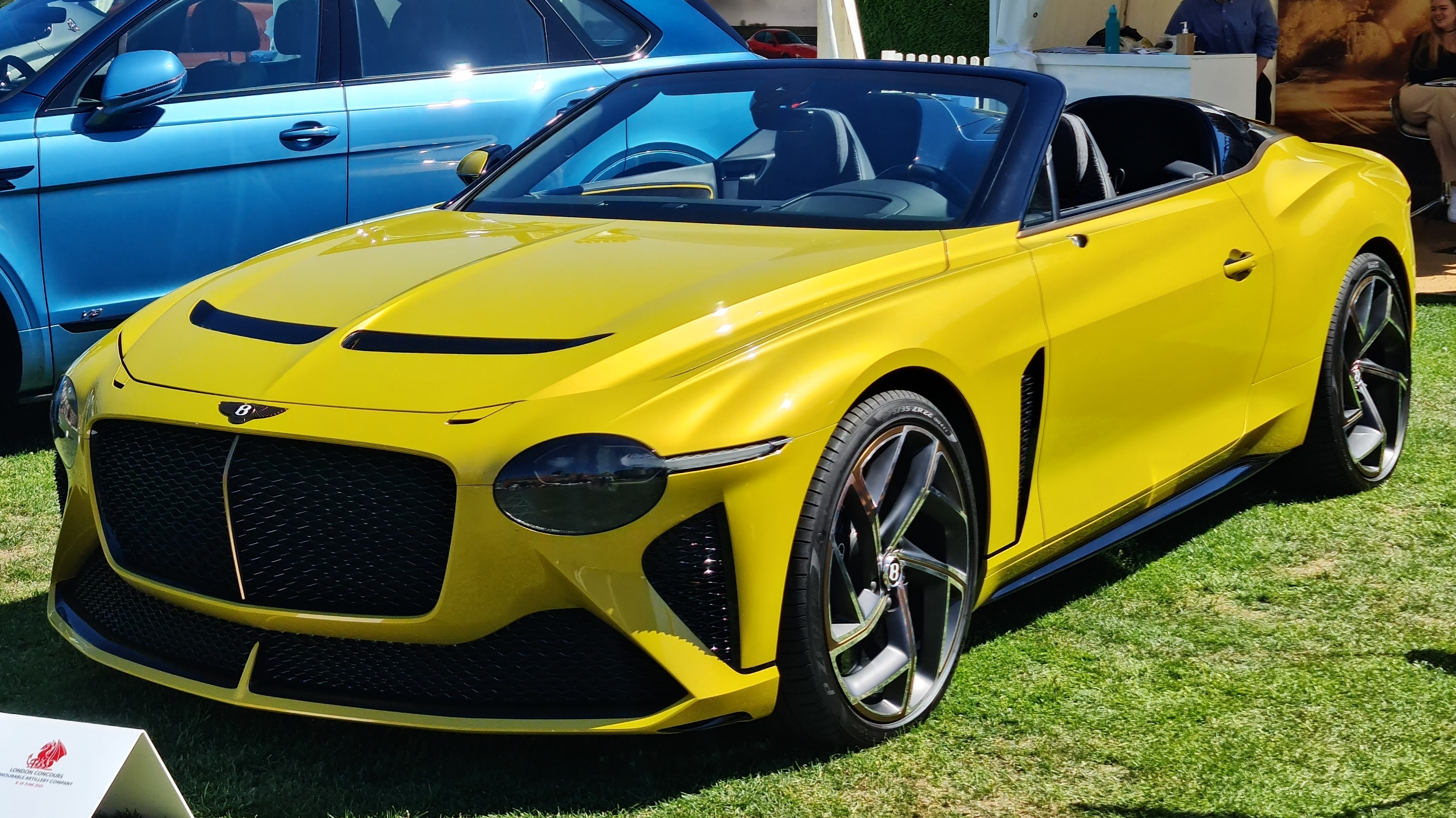
Bentley Mulliner Bacalar front view

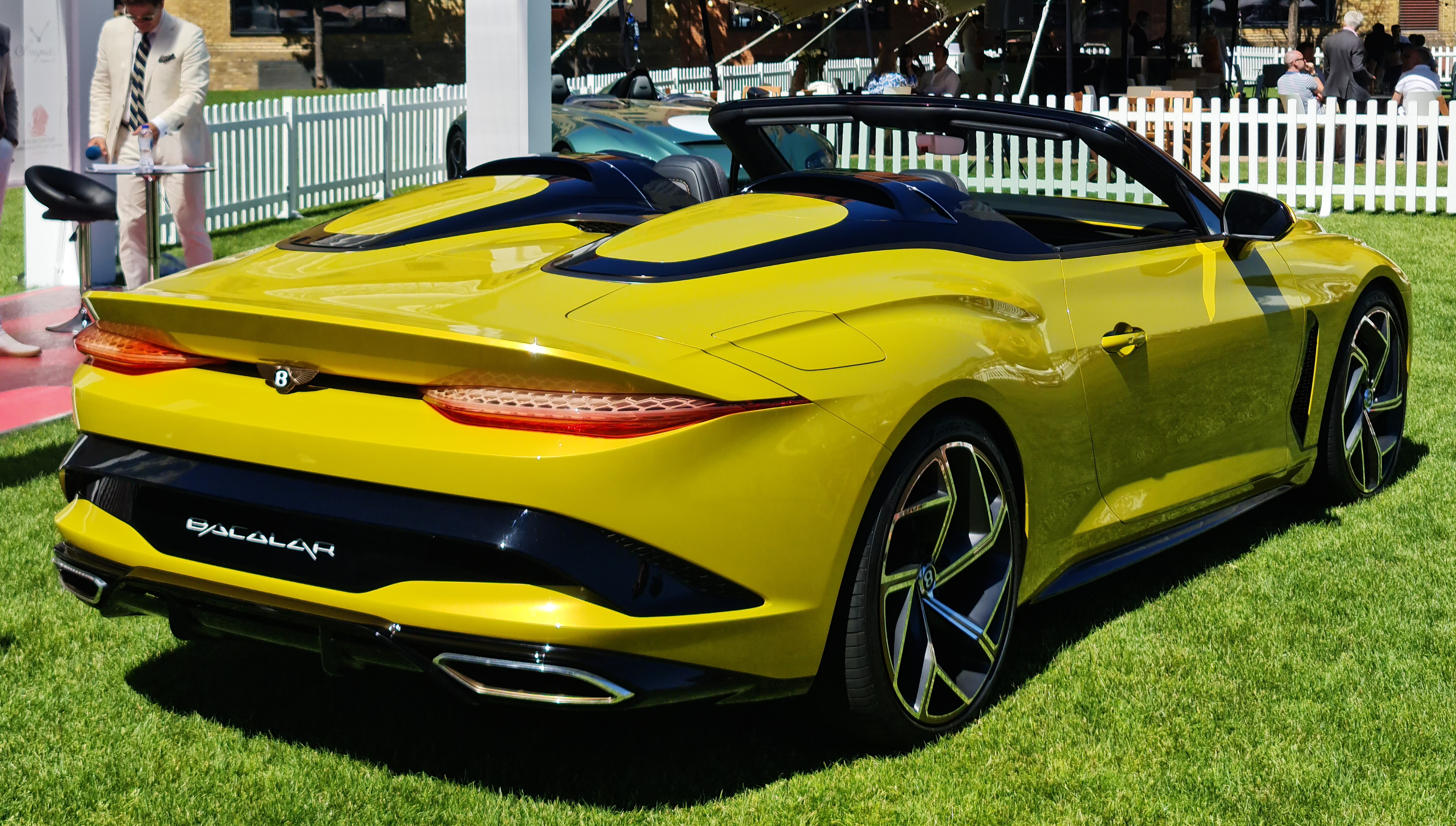
Bentley Mulliner Bacalar rear view

Designed by Bentley Mulliner, it is a limited (12 units) production roofless two-seater barchetta inspired by Bentley EXP 100 GT concept car. Superficially similar to convertible, it externally only shares door handle with Continental GT, which contains the keyless entry system. It includes a 6.0-litre W12 TSI engine rated 659 PS (485 kW; 650 hp), rear track 20 mm wider than Continental GT, bespoke, 22-inch tri-finish wheels, unique front and rear horizontal lights, model emblem 'hidden' behind the lacquer of sustainable rice husk paint, optional luggage, dark anodised titanium trim on the main controls, metallic dark bronze on Bulls-eye air vents, semi-gloss Khamun leather and natural wool upholstery, Bentley Rotating Display, unique clock face with individual one-of-12 badging, Riverwood wraparound dashboard veneer, wool overmats from Wilton. It can accelerate from 0 to 100 kph in 3.5 seconds and have a top speed of over 322 km/h (200 mph) as the third Generation Continental GT W12.

Each vehicle can be further customised by the example specifications created by Bentley Design Team:

- The Clerkenwell: Moss Green body colour, Cumbrian Green and Golden Oak upholstery, stitching in Saddle thread and the use of Cheltenham Tweed
- The Menlo: Cobalt body colour, Beluga upholstery with Cyber Yellow accent, Anthracite Alcantara textile with Piano Black veneer
- The Fulton: Lacquer Red body colour, Open Pore Riverwood and Piano Black veneer, perforated Mulliner Beluga upholstery and Hotspur accents, gloss black brightware and Beluga Alcantara textile
- The Greenwich: New Grey body colour, Cricket Ball upholstery with British accent, Grey Tweed textile, Open Pore Riverwood with High Gloss Riverwood veneer
- The Brickell: Atom Silver body colour, Hyperactive interior and exterior accents, Open Pore Riverwood and Piano Black veneer, Grey Tweed textile
- The Randwick (demonstration car): Yellow Flame body colour with Gloss Black highlights, Beluga interior upholstery and Grey Tweed textile with bright Khamun accents, Dark Bronze accent, Open Pore Riverwood and Piano Black veneers

The vehicle was unveiled in Bentley's Crewe plant, followed by 2020 Salon Privé.

Production was set to begin in 2021.

==== Production ====
Bacalar Car Zero, the engineering prototype for the production Bacalar, was under quality tests at a variety of locations around Europe as of 16 December 2020.

==== Marketing ====
As part of Bentley Mulliner Bacalar launch, Bentley launched design-your-own Bacalar competition via the @BentleyComms Twitter channel. The winner was Eleanor, whom had designed a rainbow-themed concept. The company recreated the theme with the 7 paint colours: Dragon Red II (metallic red), Orange Flame (Citric and Magenta, mixed with Mica pigment and powdered aluminium), Yellow Flame (rice husk ash), Apple Green (green), Jetstream II (blue metallic), Sequin Blue (metallic blue with deep shadow and 'flop') and Azure Purple (dark blue similar to African Violet flower).

=== Mulliner Batur (2023) ===
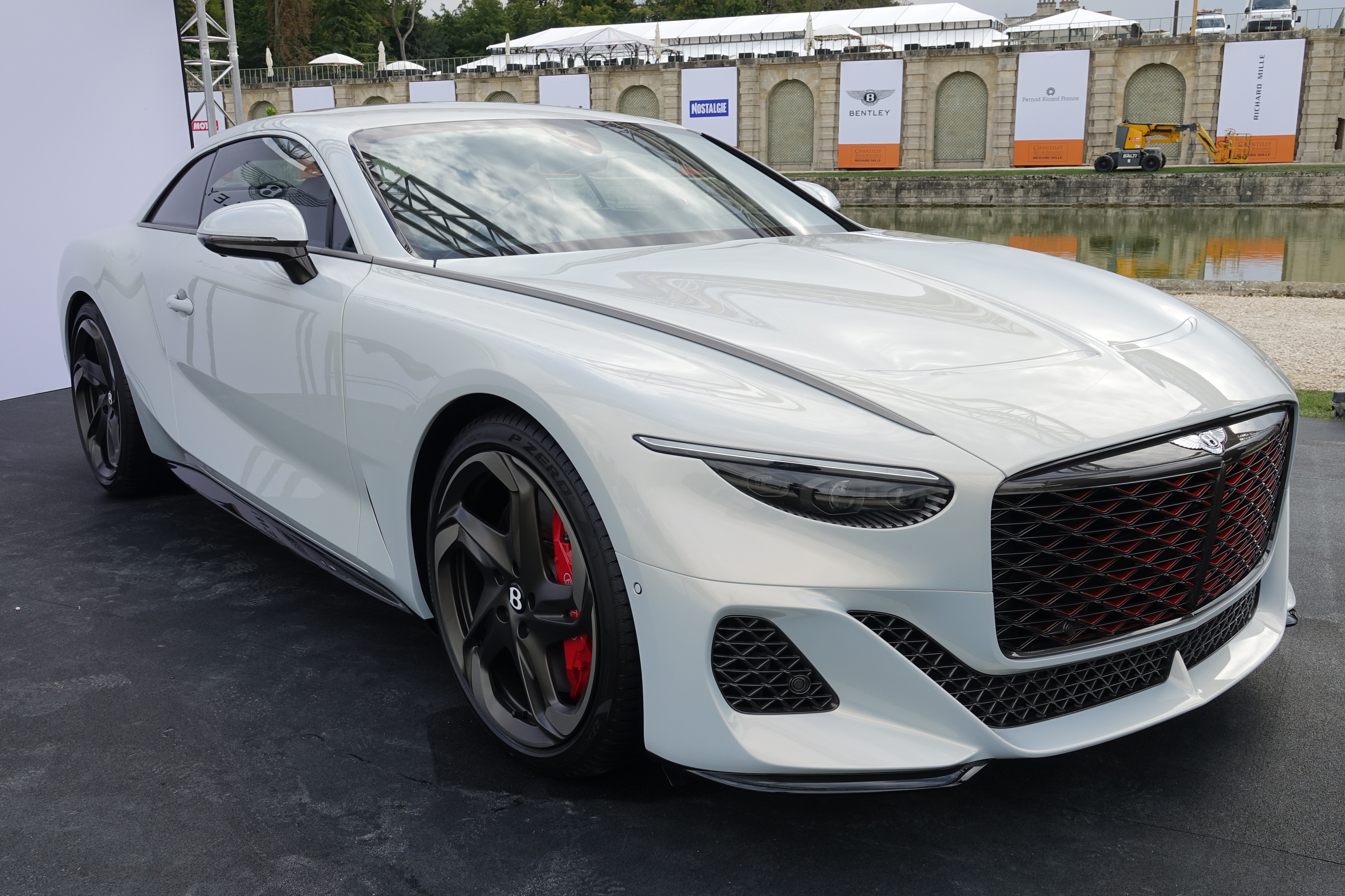
Bentley Mulliner Batur

The Bentley Mulliner Batur is a limited production model designed by the Bentley Mulliner Coachbuilt team. The Batur is named after Lake Batur, a volcanic crater lake in Kintamani on the Bali island of Indonesia. Both a convertible and coupe were offered (the Batur Coupe is simply known as Batur), with 16 convertibles and 18 coupes produced. The Batur is the last new Bentley model to use the W12 engine, as well as the most powerful, with the engine upgraded with a new intake system, upgraded turbochargers, and a revised tune to produce 740 PS (544 kW; 730 hp) at 5500 rpm and 737 lb⋅ft (999 N⋅m) of torque at 1750-5000 rpm in the coupe, and 750 PS (552 kW; 740 hp) in the convertible. Bentley claims a 0-100 km/h (62 mph) acceleration time of 3.3 seconds and a top speed of 209 mph (336 km/h) for the coupe. The base price of the Batur is around 2.1 million USD. The Batur is handcrafted in Mulliner's workshop at Bentley's carbon neutral factory in Crewe, England.

== Concept cars ==
=== Continental GTZ (2008) ===
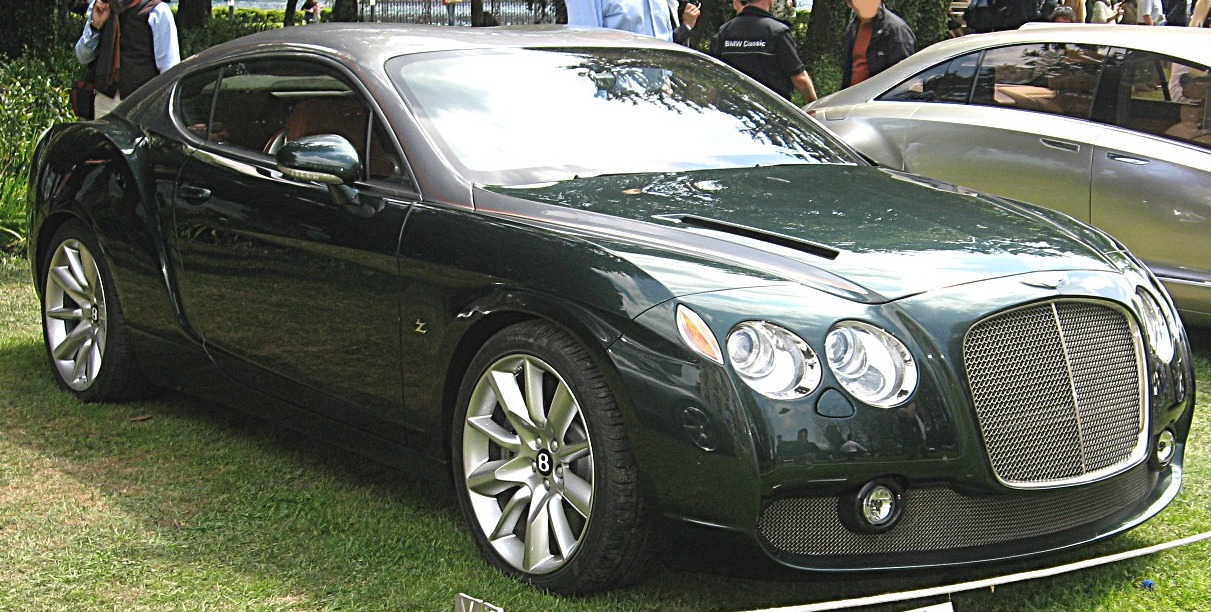
Bentley GTZ front view

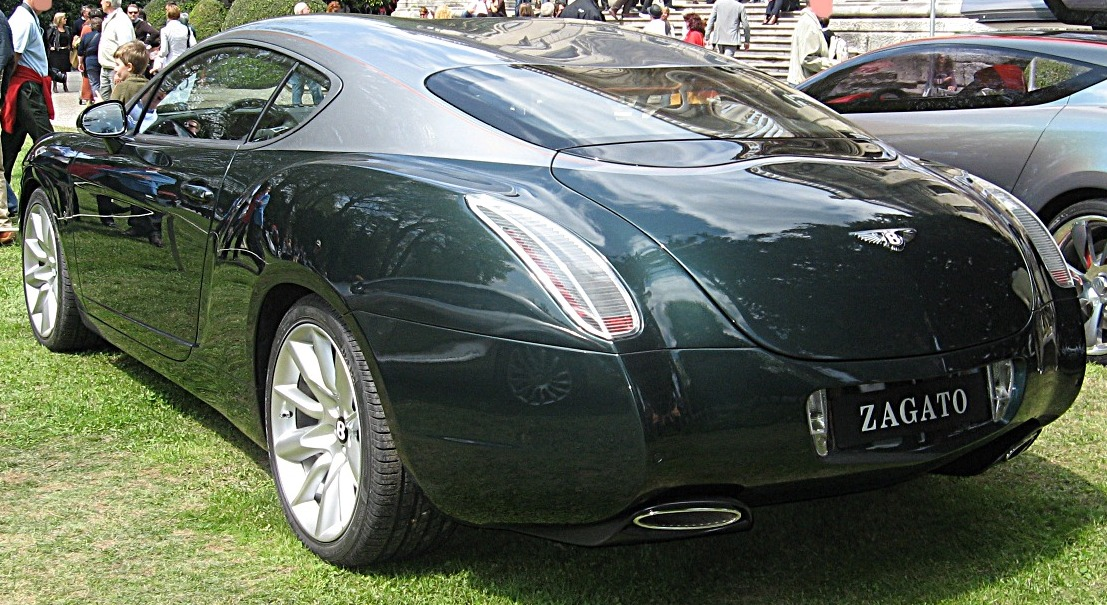
Bentley GTZ rear view

The Continental GTZ is a version of the Bentley Continental GT Speed with a custom body produced in association with Italian coachbuilder Zagato, with technical partners Coventry Prototype Panels, DELVIS GmbH and PPG. The project was conceived during a discussion between Bentley Motors Limited CEO Dr. Ing. Franz Josef Paefgen and Dr. Andrea Zagato, President of Zagato at the Pebble Beach Concours d'Elegance in 2006. According to Autoblog, the GTZ was limited to just nine examples.

The vehicle was unveiled at the 2008 Geneva Motor Show.

=== Continental Flying Star (2010) ===
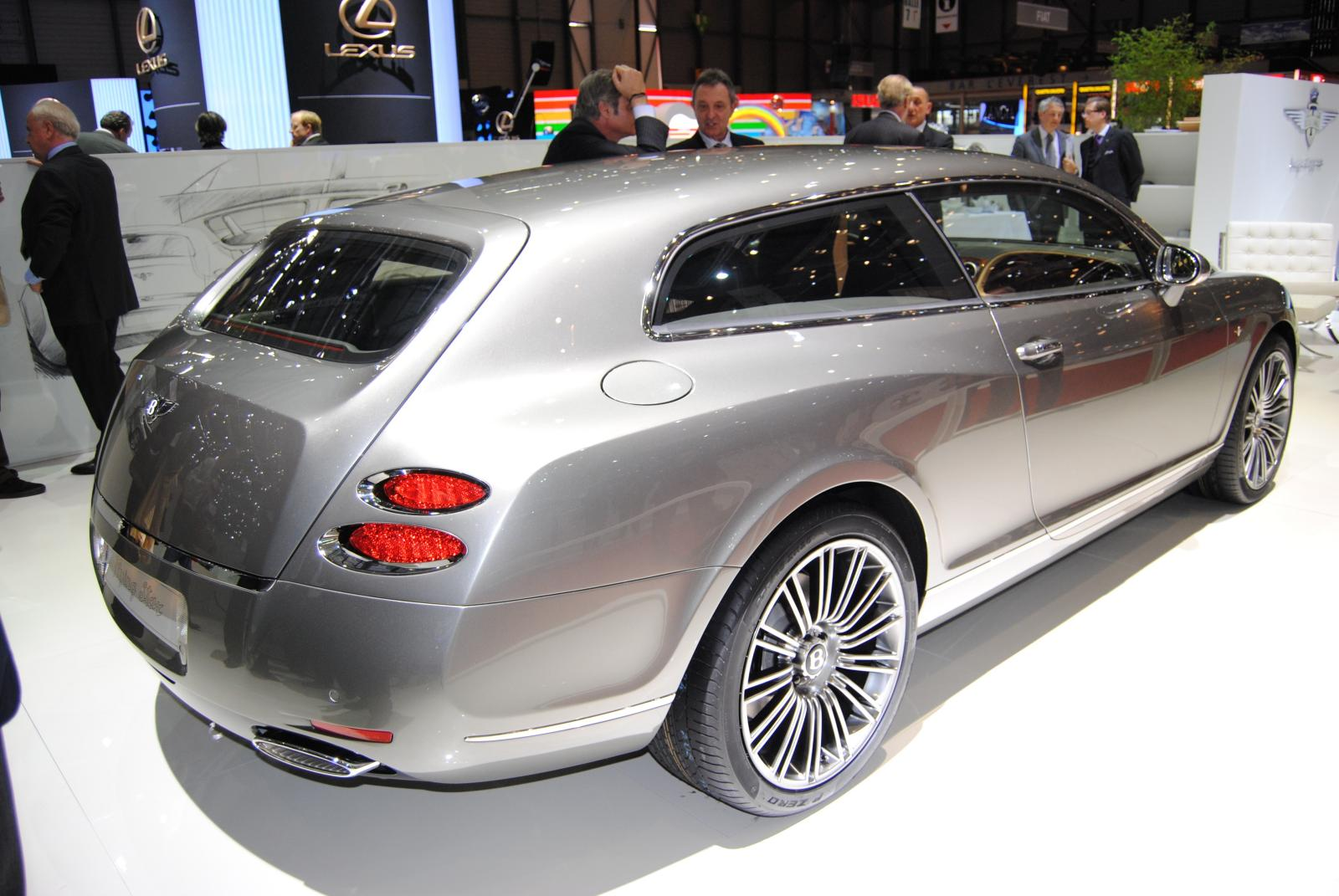
Continental Flying Star rear view

The Bentley Continental Flying Star is a 2-door wagon version of the Bentley Continental built on the basis of the Continental GTC in collaboration with Carrozzeria Touring Superleggera. Only 19 units were built.

=== Continental GT3 Concept Racer (2012) ===
The Continental GT3 Concept Racer is a race car concept based on the Continental GT V8. It was unveiled at the 2012 Paris International Auto Salon, followed by the 2012 LA Auto Show.

=== Continental GTZ (2012) ===
The 2012 Continental GTZ is the second Continental GTZ by Zagato and was built on the 2nd generation Continental platform with body panels covering the top of rear wheels.

The vehicle was unveiled at the 2012 Concorso d'Eleganza.

=== EXP 10 Speed 6 (2015) ===
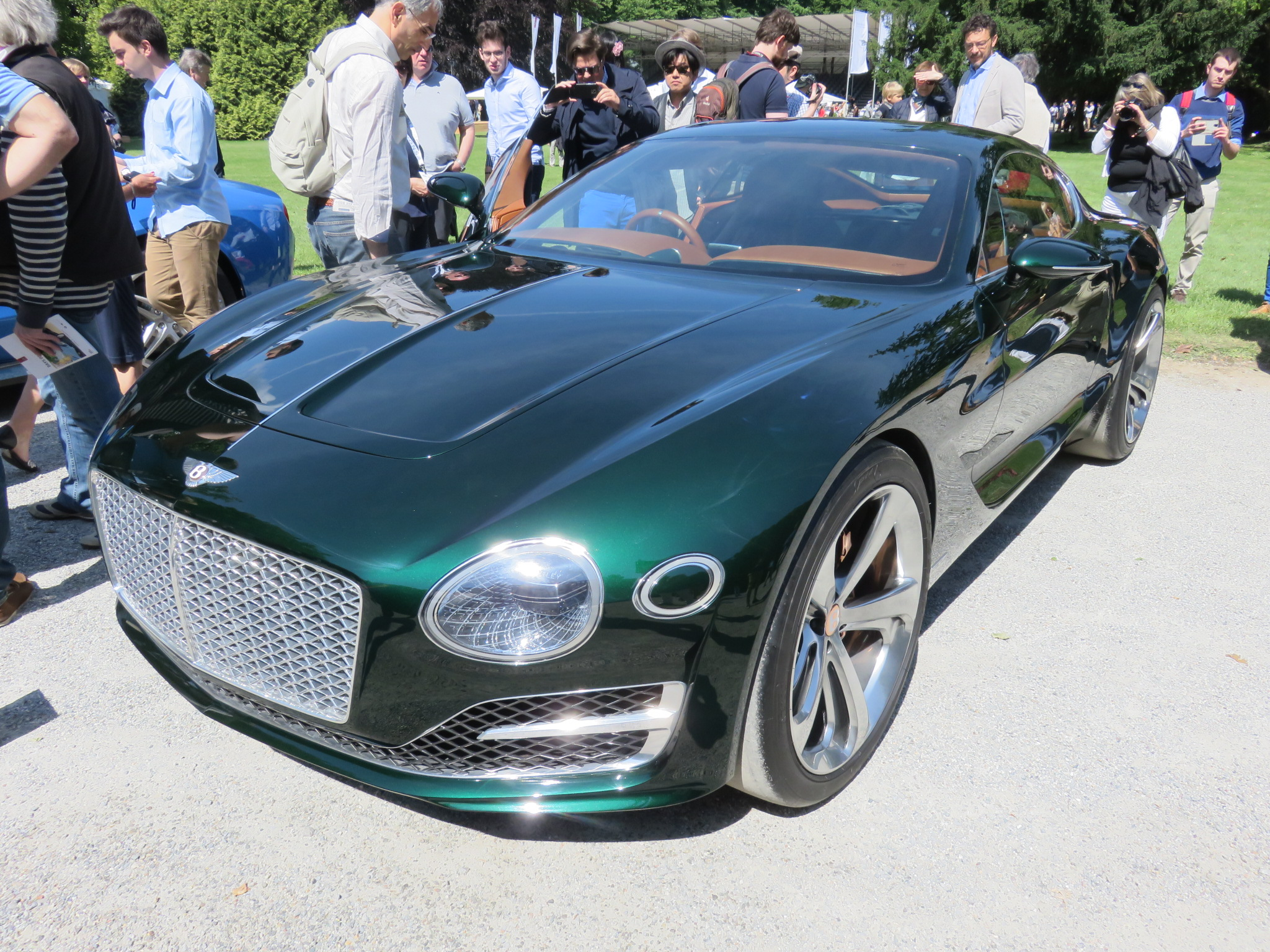
Bentley EXP 10 Speed 6 front view

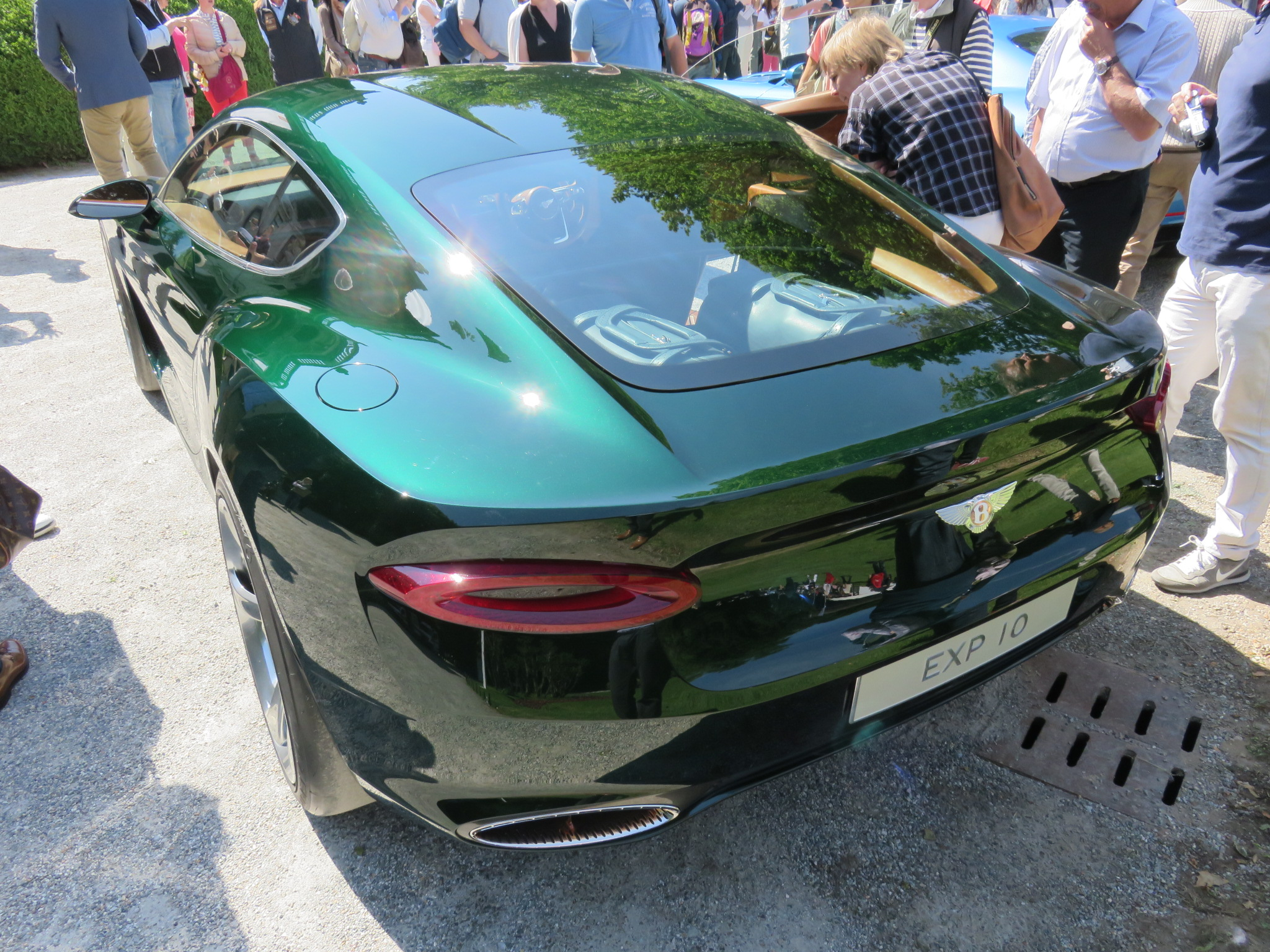
Bentley EXP 10 Speed 6 rear view

The Bentley EXP 10 Speed 6 is a concept car by Bentley based on the third generation Continental GT, launched in 2015 at the Geneva Motor Show. According to the chairman, Wolfgang Dürheimer it is another Bentley concept car for the future.

=== Bentley EXP 12 Speed 6e (2017) ===
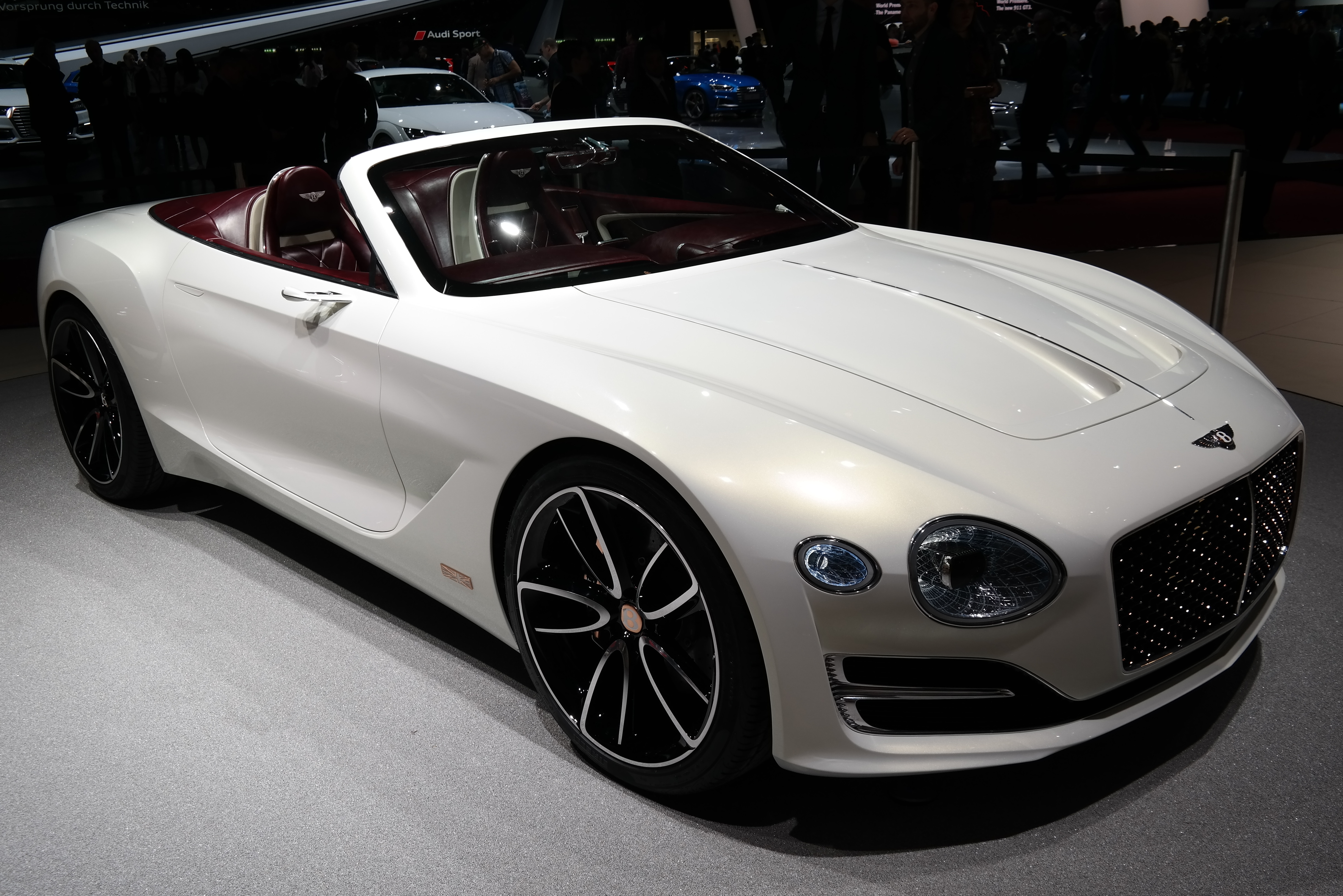
Bentley EXP 12 Speed 6e front view

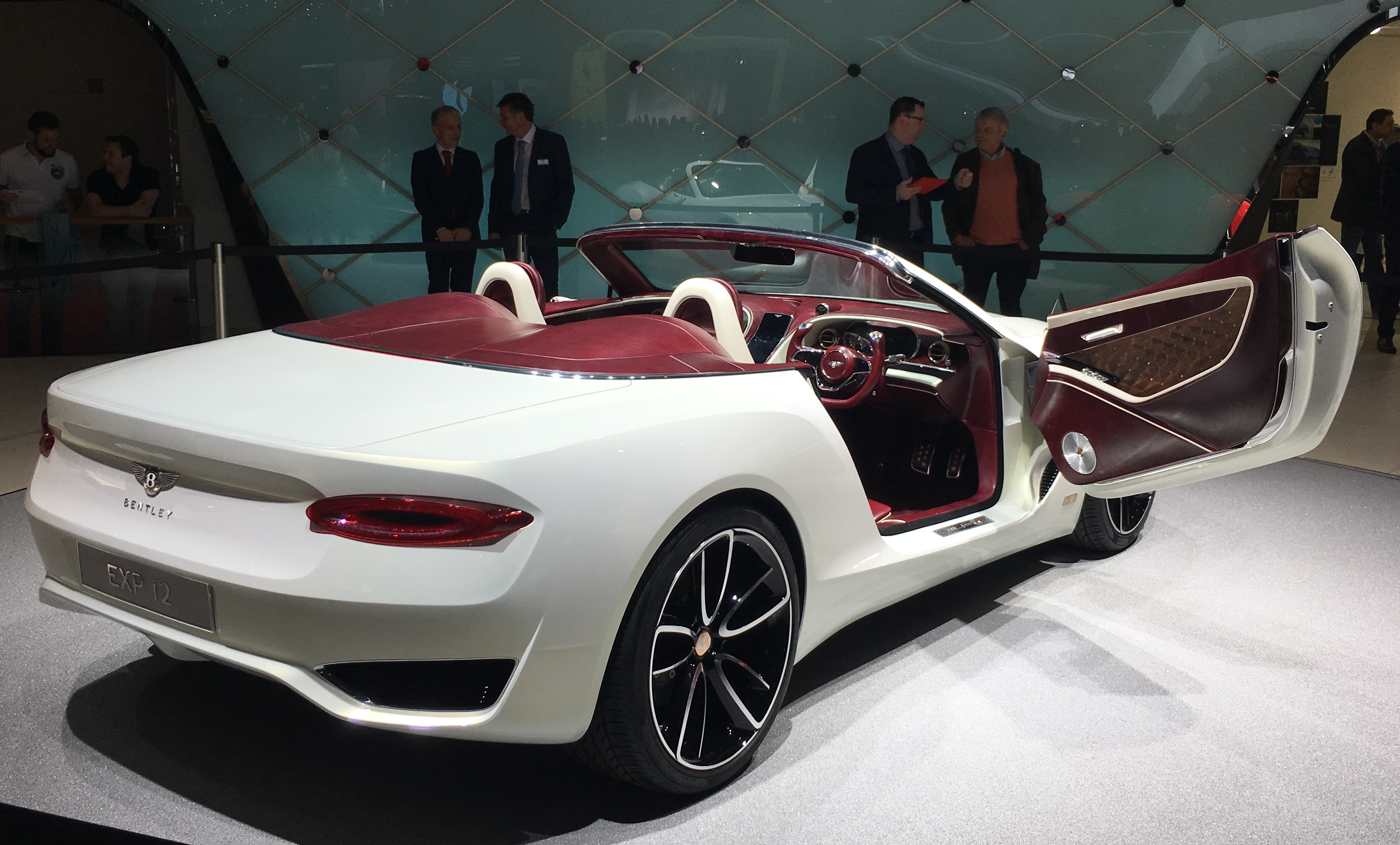
Bentley EXP 12 Speed 6e rear view

The Bentley EXP 12 Speed 6e is an all electric Concept car by Bentley Motors unveiled at the 2017 Geneva Motor Show. The design is inspired by its successful predecessor, the EXP 10 Speed Six, and the 3rd generation Continental GT. The interior design matches its predecessor's design and is only available as a convertible. According to the chairman, Wolfgang Dürheimer, this car was made to gather customer reaction on the electrification of their future models.

=== EXP 100 GT (2019) ===
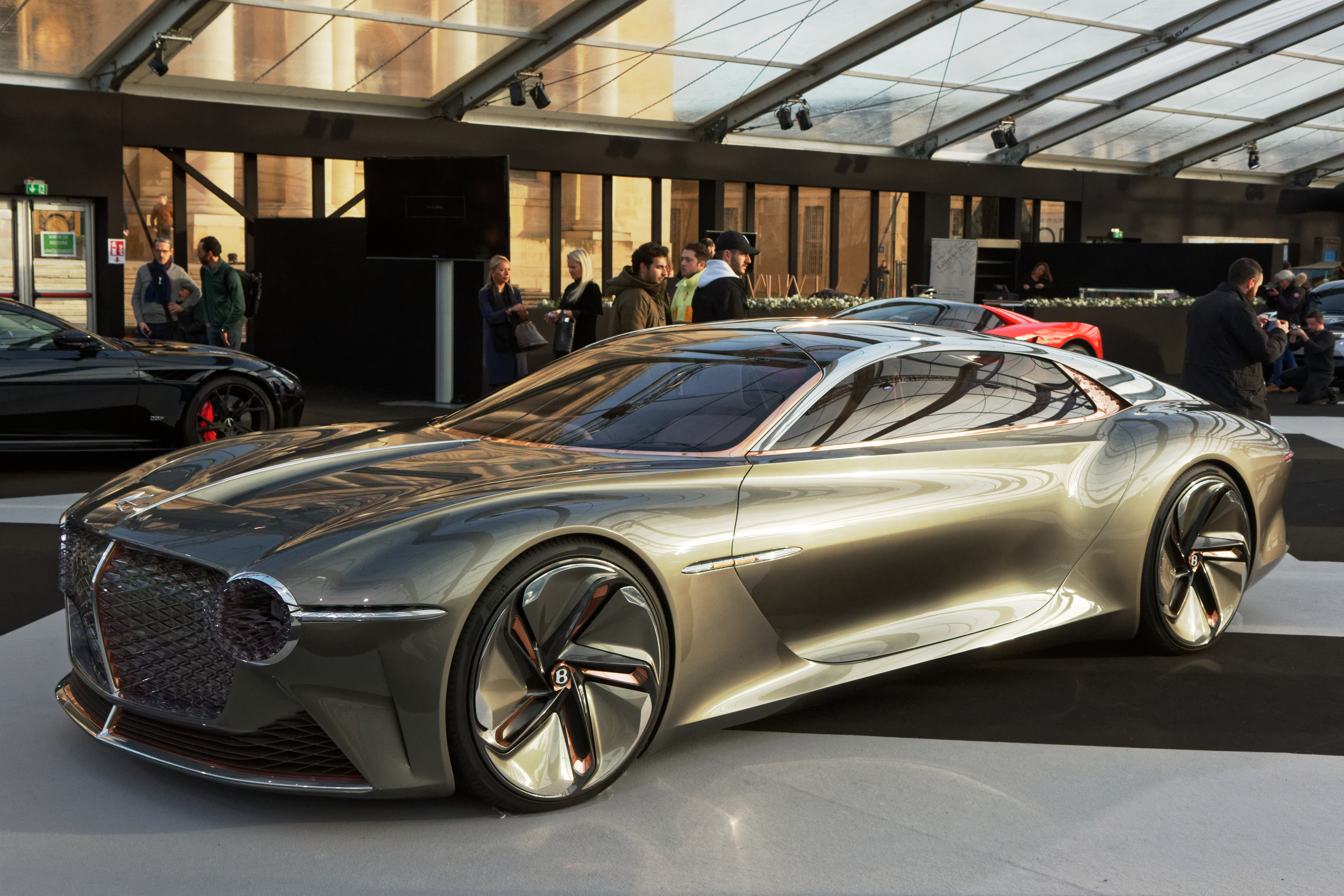
Bentley EXP 100 GT front View

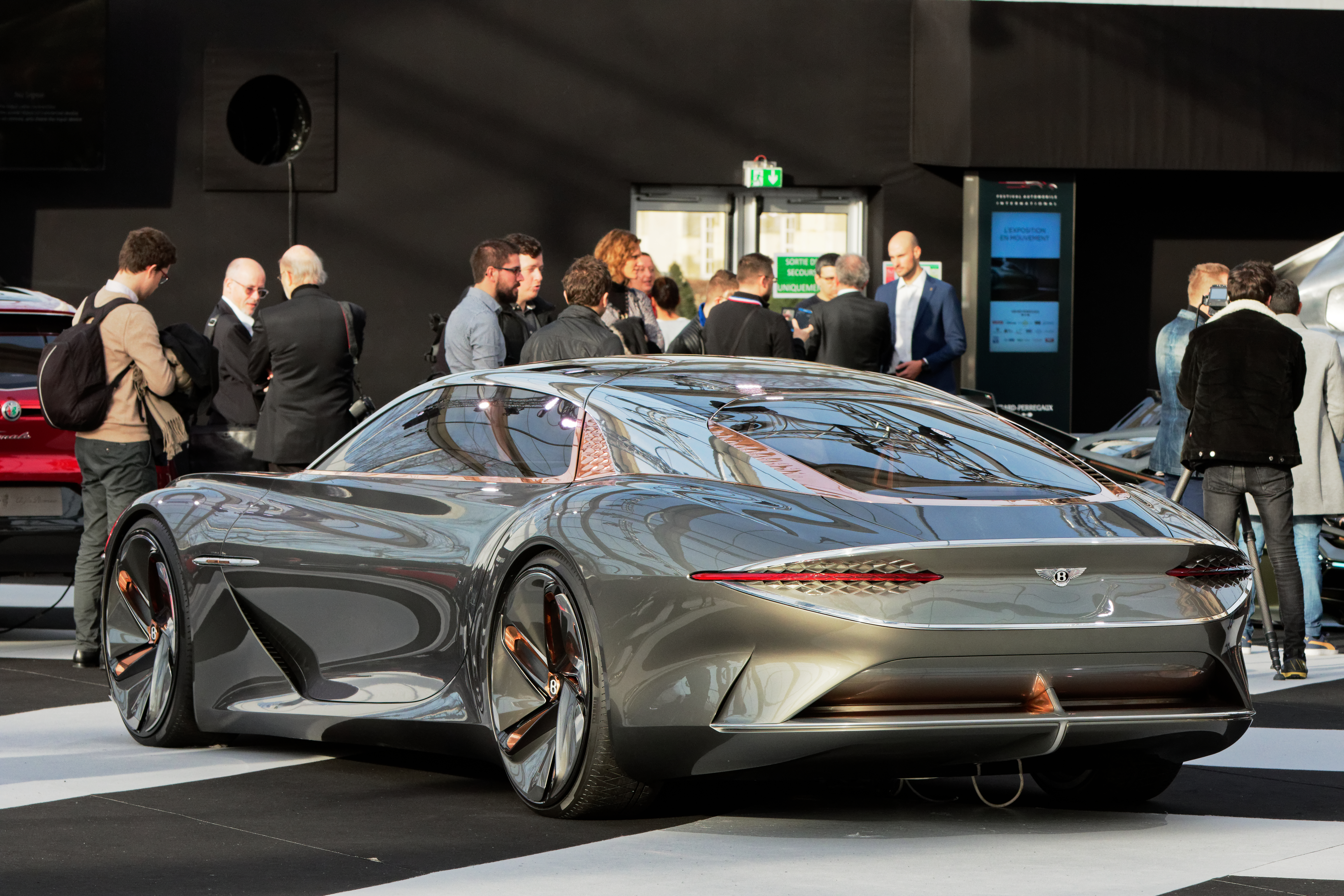
Bentley EXP 100 GT rear View

The Bentley EXP 100 GT is a concept car introduced by Bentley for its 100th anniversary, on 10 July 2019. It is Bentley's vision of a GT car for 2035. The car is a fully electric 2-door coupe which can accelerate from 0-60 mph in 2.5 seconds and has a top speed of 186 mph.

== Motorsports ==
=== First generation (2003–2011) ===
In early 2007, a Bentley Continental GT Speed equipped with Nokian Hakkapeliitta Sport Utility 5 studded winter tyres and driven by four-time World Rally Champion Juha Kankkunen, broke the World Speed Record on Ice – on the frozen Baltic Sea near Oulu, Finland. It averaged 321.6 km/h (199.83 mph) in both directions on the "flying kilometre", reaching a maximum speed of 331 km/h (205.67 mph). The previous record was 296 km/h (183.9 mph), achieved with a Bugatti EB110 Supersport. The record-breaking Bentley was largely standard except for a roll-cage, aerodynamic improvements, low-temperature fuel and calibration.

In February 2011, Bentley succeeded in breaking their own land-ice speed record previously set by the Continental GT. They managed to bring a slightly modified Supersports Convertible to 205.48 MPH in Finland, verified by Guinness World Records.

On 15 February 2011 Kankkunen broke the record again, reaching an average speed of 331 km/h (205.67 mph) in a convertible Bentley Continental Supersports. Bentley announced that a limited edition of the car would be released to celebrate the achievement. It seems that Bentley provoked the former tyre supplier by attempting a new record with a different brand (using Pirelli Sotto Zero IIs) because, on 6 March 2011, Nokian Tyres test driver, piloting an Audi RS6 with Nokian Hakkapeliitta 7 studded tyres, took the ice speed record in Finland, clocking a top speed of 206.05 mph (331.61 km/h) in freezing conditions.

=== Continental GT3 (2013–2018) ===
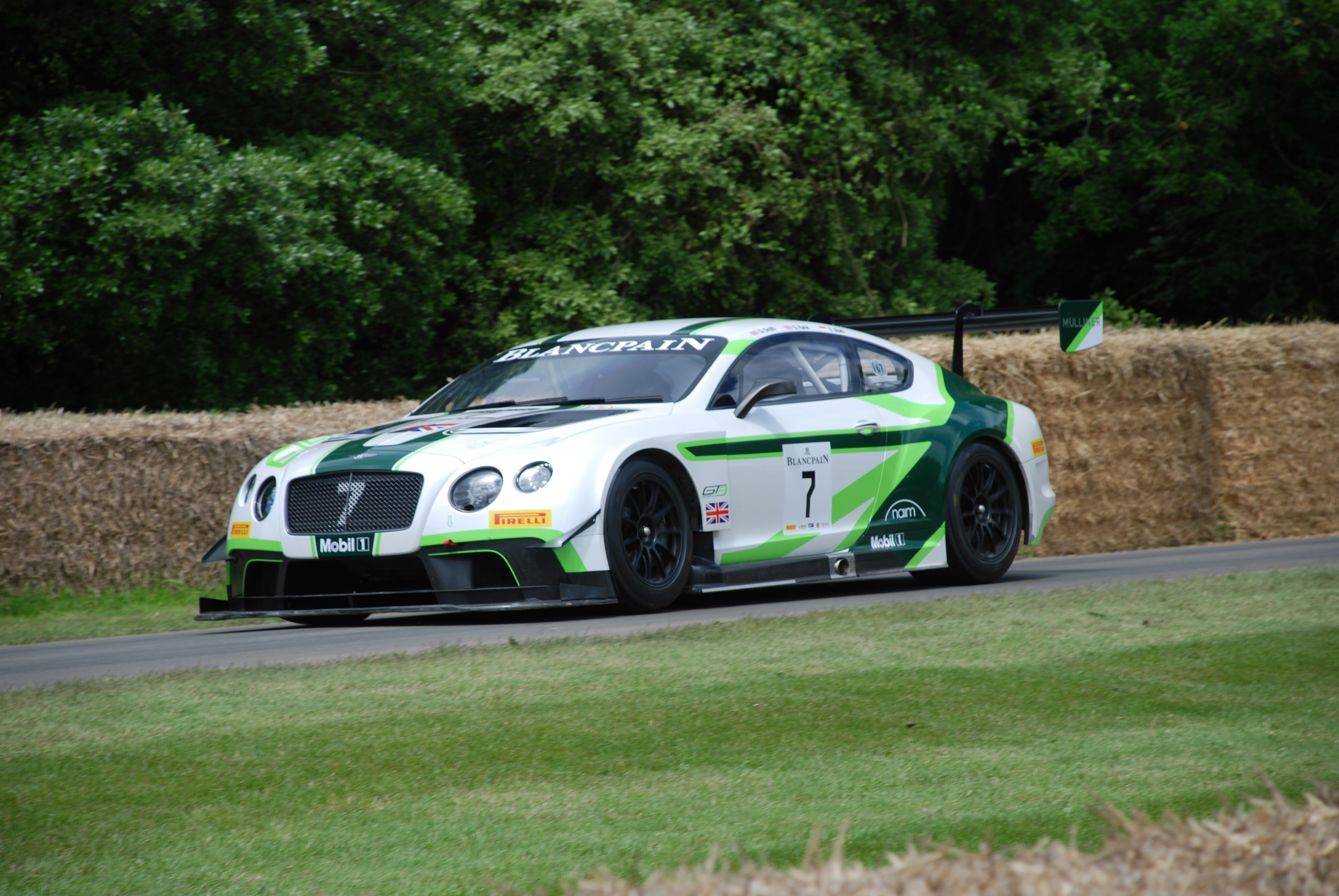
Bentley Continental GT3 front view

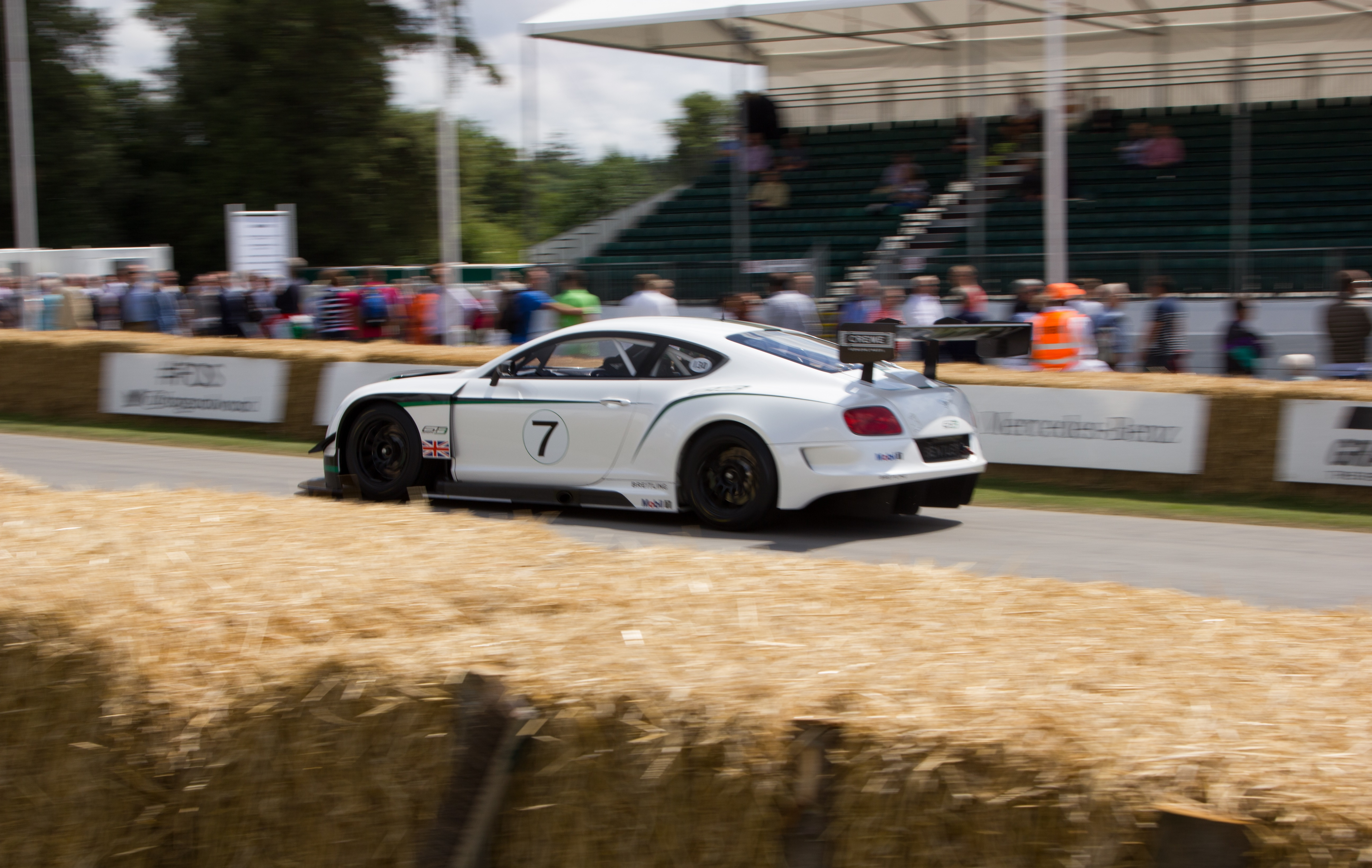
Bentley Continental GT3 rear view

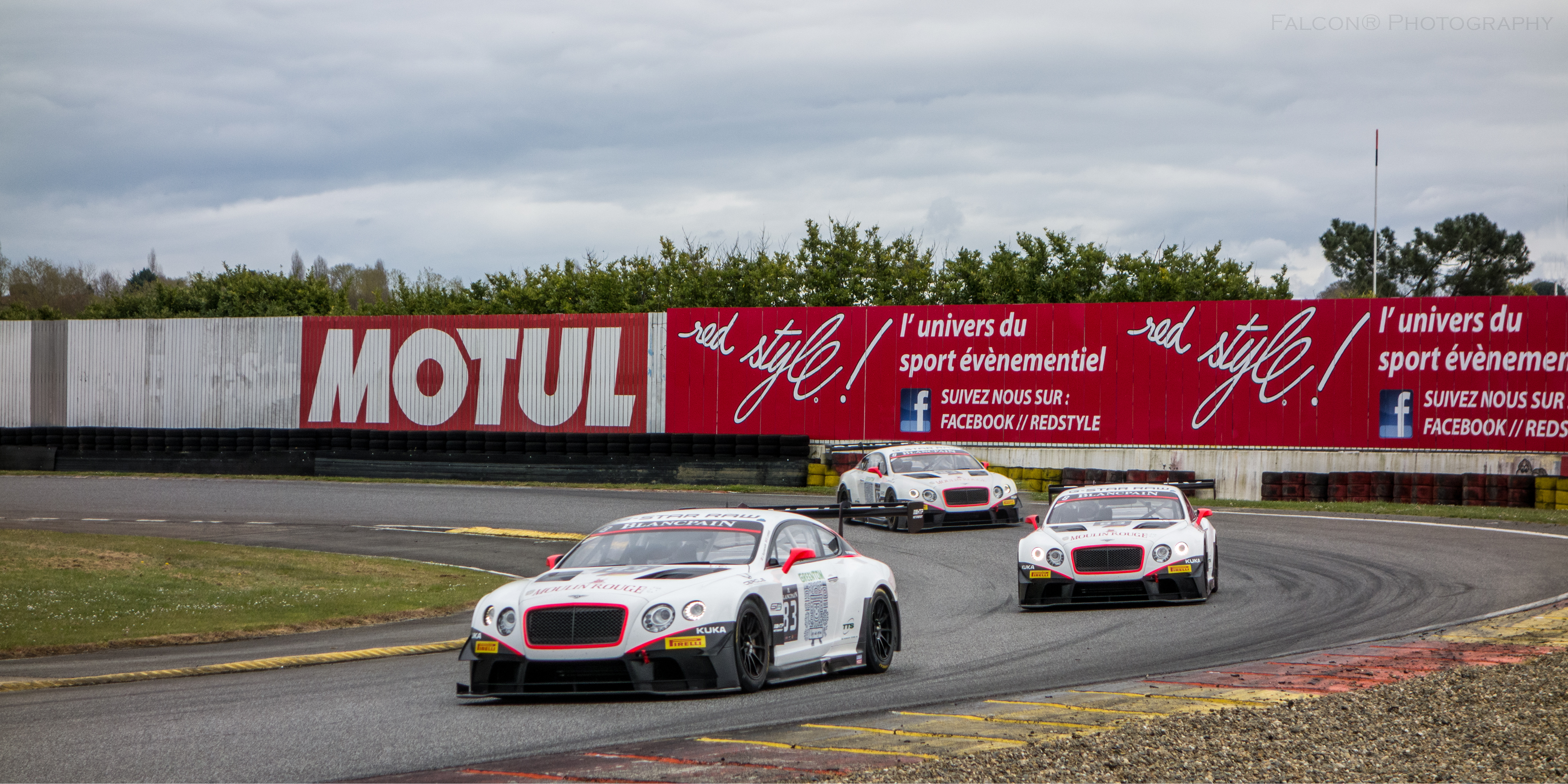
Bentley Continental GT3-R

The Continental GT3 is a rear-wheel-drive race car version of Continental GT V8 coupe, based on the Continental GT3 Concept Racer. It was unveiled at the 2013 Goodwood Festival of Speed, followed by the 2013 Rolex Monterey Motorsports Reunion and the 2014 Goodwood Festival of Speed.

It includes a 4.0-litre twin-turbo V8 engine rated at 608 PS (447 kW; 600 hp), as well as a Xtrac six-speed sequential gearbox with a limited-slip differential in transaxle, racing clutch, steering wheel mounted paddle operated pneumatic gear shift, Drivetrain Carbon fibre propshaft, double wishbone suspension front and rear, four-way adjustable racing dampers; hydraulic power-assisted steering, ventilated iron disc brakes front and rear, Brembo 6/4-piston front/rear calipers, driver-adjustable brake bias, FIA-specification steel roll cage, Sparco six-point FIA safety harness, onboard fire extinguisher, onboard pneumatic jack system, FIA-specification racing fuel cell, race-specification ABS and traction control, lightweight race battery, OZ Racing 18x13-inch rims with 310/710R18 tyres and the removal of the leather and wood interior trim.

The design was completed by a specialist team of engineers from Bentley Motors supported by the Continental GT3 Technical Partner, M-Sport Ltd.

Bentley Motorsport first entered development races with the Continental GT3 before starting full competition in the Blancpain GT Series in 2014 after completing FIA homologation. The first race began at Gulf 12 Hours, held at the Yas Marina Circuit in Abu Dhabi. The Team M-Sport Wald International car completed the Gulf 12 Hours race in fourth place. In May 2014, the factory team won the Silverstone round of the Blancpain Endurance Series.

The Bentley Continental GT3 won the 2015 Blancpain GT Sprint Series championship with drivers Vincent Abril and Maximilian Buhk. In the 2015 Blancpain GT Endurance Series the Continental GT3 came just 3 points shy of winning the championship, earning second place.

At the 2016 Bathurst 12 Hour, two Bentley Team M-Sport GT3s completed the race in third and seventh place.

In 2016, Bentley Motorsport planned to enter 90 top-level GT races around the world in 2016, including the Blancpain GT Series, SRO Intercontinental GT Challenge, Blancpain Endurance Series, Pirelli World Challenge, GT Asia, ADAC GT Masters, The British GT Championship and the Nürburgring 24 Hours.

The race car was entered in the 2016 Goodwood hill climb, driven by David Brabham.

==== Other second generation cars ====
A Continental GTC W12 and Continental GT V8 were used in Nürburgring 24 Hour Race as official parade cars.

A Continental GT V8 was entered in the 2012 Goodwood Festival of Speed hill climb.

The Continental GTC W12, Continental Supersports and Continental GT V8 became the official parade cars for the 2012 Nürburgring 24 Hour Race.

A 2016 Bentley Continental GT Speed driven by John Bowe reached a top speed of 331 km/h (206 mph) at Stuart Highway, Australia.

=== Continental GT3 (2018–2021) ===
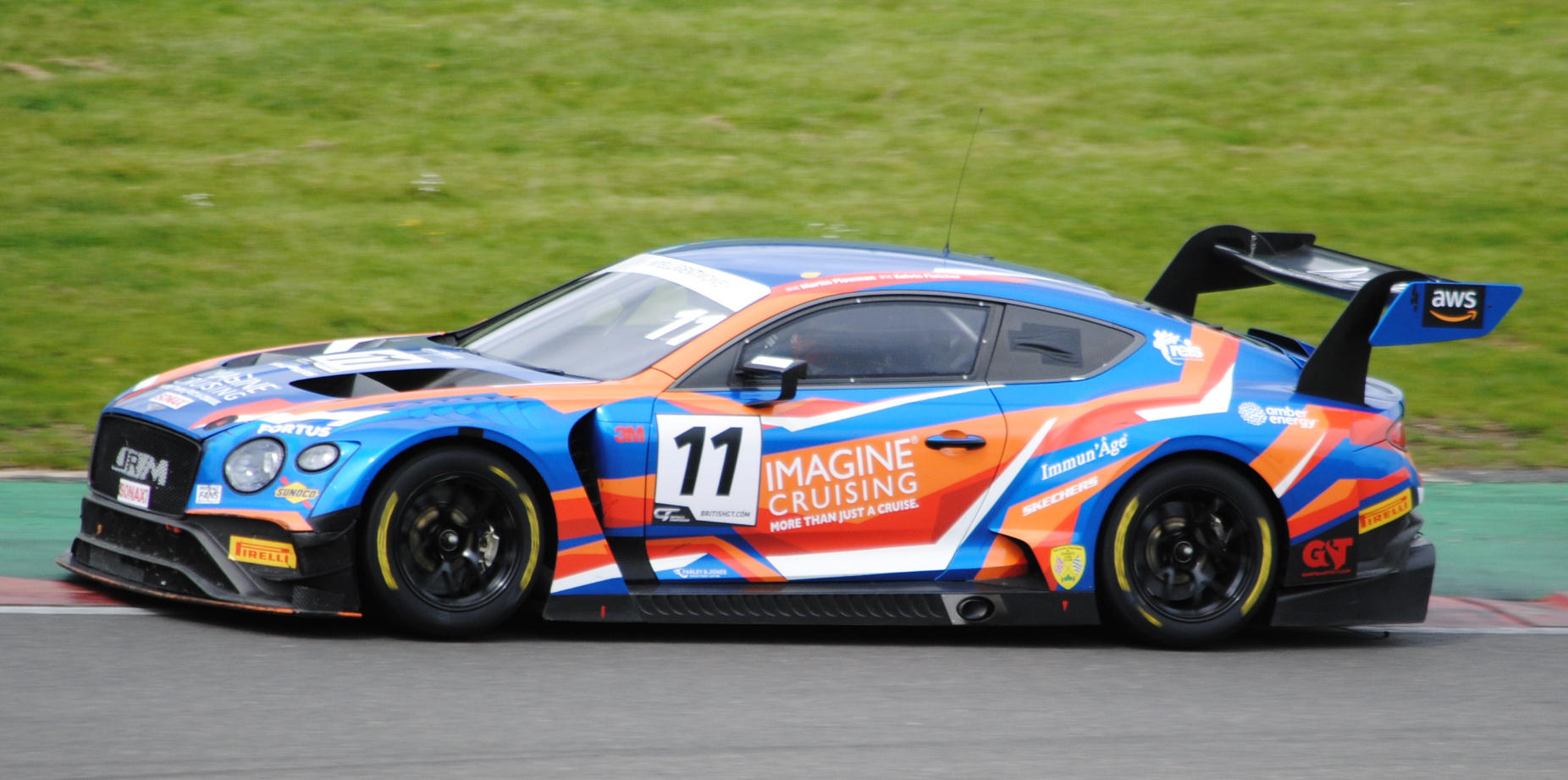
Bentley Continental GT3 side view

Bentley Motorsport unveiled the new Continental GT3 based on the third generation Continental GT in November 2017. The rear-wheel drive race car utilises a >550 bhp 4.0-litre twin-turbo V8. It made its race debut at the opening round of the 2018 Blancpain GT Series Endurance Cup.

The Bentley Continental GT3 won the 2020 Liqui-Moly Bathurst 12 Hour with drivers Jules Gounon, Jordan Pepper and Maxime Soulet.

In 2020, Bentley announced plans to retire the Continental GT3 program at the end of the 2021 season, citing the manufacturer's focus on electric vehicles as the reason.

== Production ==
=== First generation (2003–2011) ===
Continental GT was designed, engineered and built in Crewe.

12th Annual Elton John AIDS Foundation Fundraiser for $400,000 to Alabama native Joe Blount.

Production of the Continental GTC began at the Crewe, Cheshire plant in September 2006, before the ending production of Bentley vehicles in Volkswagen Group manufacturing facility in Dresden, Germany at December 2006.

As of 14 May 2009, Continental models were certified to have 85% recyclability (or 95% recoverability) of materials.

=== Second generation (2011–2018) ===
The Continental GT3's steering wheel, door pulls and seat were built in the Crewe plant.

The first Continental GT3 car was built by the Bentley motorsport team in conjunction with M-Sport.

The Continental GT3-R was built in the Crewe plant and finished in Bentley's Motorsport division.

The production of the Volkswagen Group W12 engines used in Continental GT W12 engine models were relocated to the Crewe plant from the end of 2014 onwards. Some of the panels on the GT are made with super forming.

The interior of the Continental GT Speed was built in Bentley's Leather and Trim workshop.

| Year | Production | |
| Year | Coupé | Cabriolet |
|---|---|---|
| 2003 | 107 | - |
| 2004 | 6,896 | - |
| 2005 | 4,733 | - |
| 2006 | 3,611 | 1,742 |
| 2007 | 2,140 | 4,847 |
| 2008 | 2,699 | 2,408 |
| 2009 | 1,211 | 722 |
| 2010 | 1,735 | 843 |
| 2011 | 3,416 | 677 |
| 2012 | 3,536 | 2,638 |
| 2013 | 3,602 | 2,197 |
| 2014 | 3,442 | 2,151 |
| 2015 | 3,997 | 2,216 |
| 2016 | 2,272 | 1,600 |
| 2017 | 1,345 | 1,468 |
| 2018 | 2,841 | 28 |
| 2019 | 3,903 | 2,750 |
| 2020 | 1,995 | 1,244 |
| 2021 | 3,031 | 1,972 |
| 2022 | 4,793 | |
| 2023 | 4,168 | |

== Marketing ==
=== First generation (2003–2011) ===
The Continental GT was marketed to new customers with an average age of just under 50 years old, with 75% upper luxury coupé buyer not from existing customer base.

Breitling SA produced a limited edition (1000 units per colour) Breitling for Bentley Supersports chronograph wrist watches (based on Breitling Calibre 26B) inspired by the Bentley Continental Supersports car.

Breitling SA produced a series of 1000-unit Bentley Supersports Light Body wrist watches (based on the Breitling Calibre 27B) to commemorate the Bentley Continental Supersports Convertible's ice speed record. The watch was unveiled at Baselworld in 2011.

=== Second generation (2011–2018) ===
The Continental GT3's Motorsport Collection, including race clothing (technical polo shirts, T-shirts, race-wear, Bentley motorsport hoodie, baseball cap, racing overall), race duffle bag, ear plugs, GT3 Lanyard, GT3 Espresso, beach towel, were unveiled at the 2016 Geneva Motor Show.

To commemorate the Continental Supersports launch, Breitling SA produced a limited (500 units) Breitling for Bentley Supersports B55 chronograph.

As part of the Continental GT Convertible launch, Ettinger of London produced leather goods under the Bentley Collection label to complement the new colour Breeze created for Continental GT Convertible, which included iPhone case and the Blackberry case, leather loop keyring and key case. Model Assemblies produced 50 1:43 Continental GT Convertible model cars in Breeze. A series of 2012 Bentley Collection items were also produced, including 'The Flying B' range a desk paperweight, letter opener and wine bottle stopper; 'Inspired by Our Heritage' four-piece Espresso coffee cup set featuring original racing scenes from the Brooklands and Le Mans racetracks; jackets, polo shirts and soft shell fleeces, Anthony Holt Silversmiths made-to-order Valet boxes, silver 1:12 replica of the Bentley Blower, Bentley Eyewear Collection sunglasses (in fine wood, Asian water buffalo horn, 18ct white, yellow and rose gold). The sunglasses were produced by Estede, with lenses produced by Zeiss.

As part of the Continental GT V8 launch, Breitling SA created a 250-piece limited edition of its Bentley GMT chronograph (based on the Breitling Calibre 47B) featuring a second time-zone display.

To demonstrate Bentley Continental GT's cold climate capabilities, Bentley Power on Ice programme returned in February 2013, allowing existing owners, enthusiasts and aspiring drivers the chance to explore the extreme limits of the Continental GT on the frozen lakes of northern Finland.

== Specifications ==
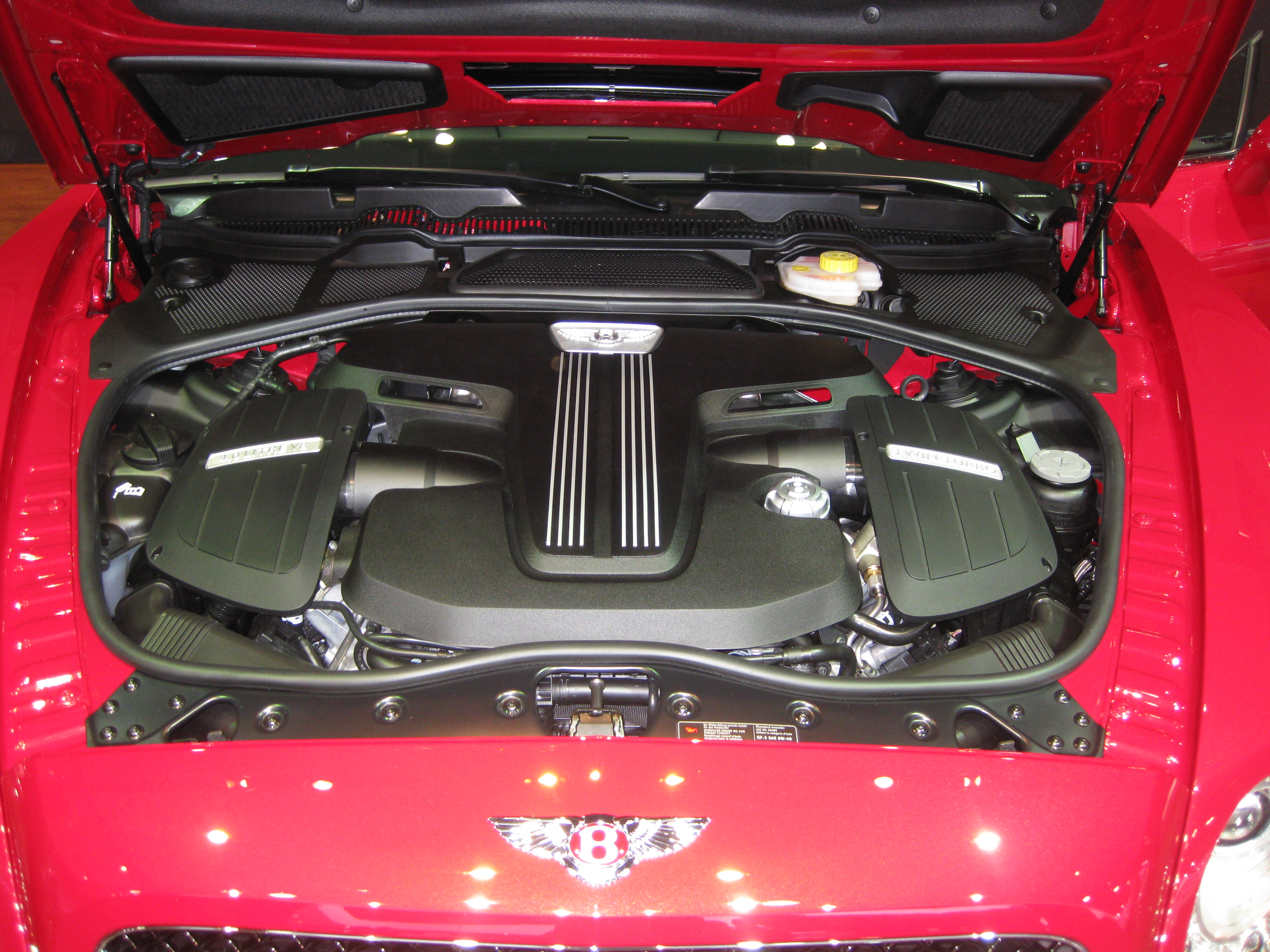
Bentley Continental GT V8 engine

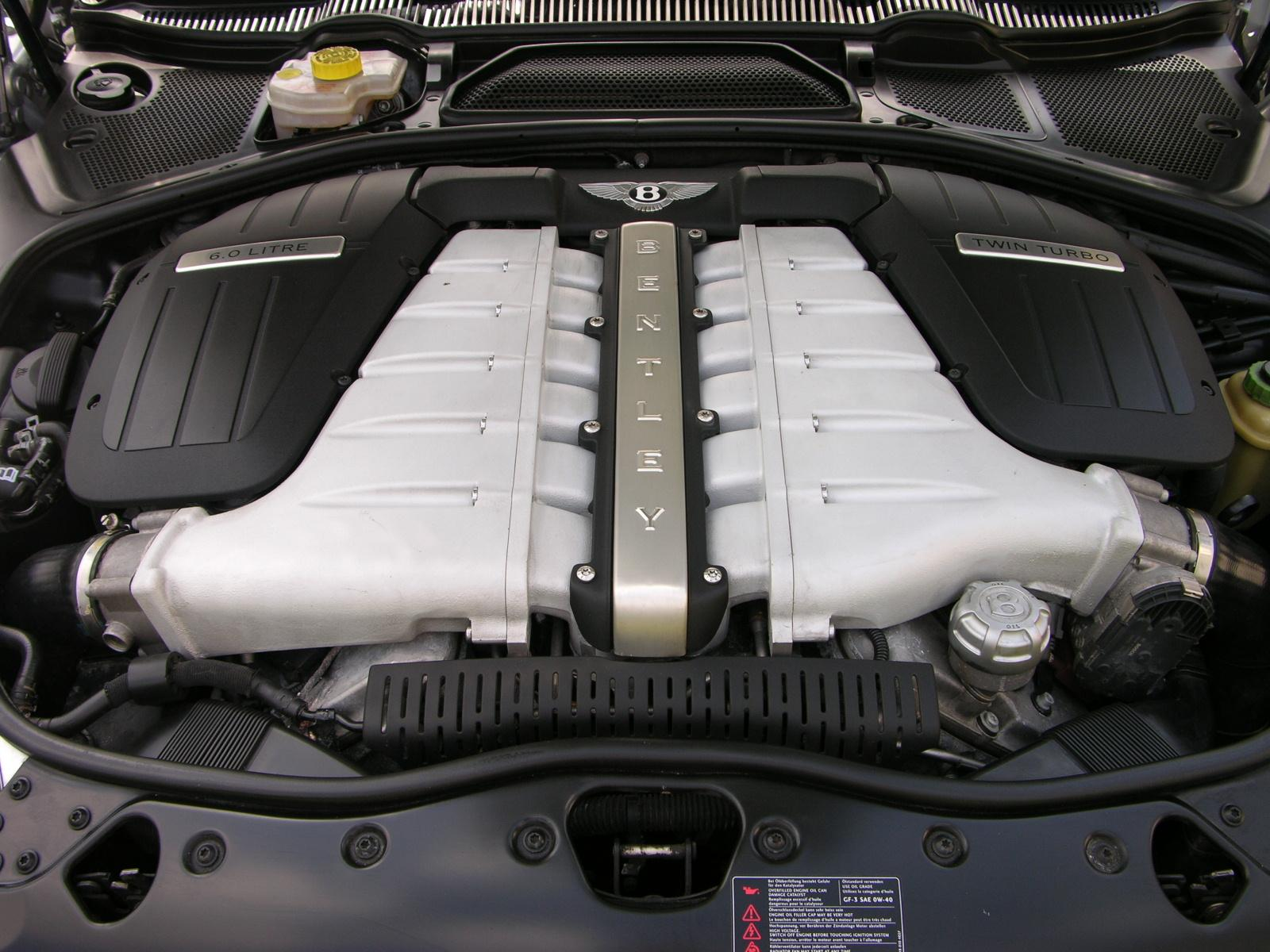
Bentley Continental GT W12 engine

=== First generation (2003–2011) ===
==== Engines ====
Petrol engines
| Model | Years | Type/code | Power at rpm, Torque at rpm |
|---|---|---|---|
| Continental GT | 2003–2010 | 5,998 cc (366.0 cu in) W12 twin turbo | 560 PS (412 kW; 552 hp) at 6,000, 650 N⋅m (479 lb⋅ft) at 1,700 |
| Continental GTC | 2006–2010 | 5,998 cc (366.0 cu in) W12 twin turbo | 560 PS (412 kW; 552 hp) at 6,000, 650 N⋅m (479 lb⋅ft) at 1,700 |
| Continental GT Speed | 2007–2010 | 5,998 cc (366.0 cu in) W12 twin turbo | 608 PS (447 kW; 600 hp) at 6,000, 750 N⋅m (553 lb⋅ft) at 1,750 |
| Continental GTC Speed | 2009–2010 | 5,998 cc (366.0 cu in) W12 twin turbo | 608 PS (447 kW; 600 hp) at 6,000, 750 N⋅m (553 lb⋅ft) at 1,750 |
| Continental Supersports | 2009–2010 | 5,998 cc (366.0 cu in) W12 twin turbo | 630 PS (463 kW; 621 hp) at 6,000, 800 N⋅m (590 lb⋅ft) at 1,700 |
| Continental Supersports Convertible | 2010 | 5,998 cc (366.0 cu in) W12 twin turbo | 630 PS (463 kW; 621 hp) at 6,000, 800 N⋅m (590 lb⋅ft) at 1,700 |

=== Second generation (2011–2018) ===
==== Body styles ====
Petrol engines
| Model | Coupe | Convertible |
|---|---|---|
| GT V8 | 2013–2018 | 2012–2018 |
| GT V8 S | 2014–2018 | 2014–2018 |
| GT3-R | 2015 | N/A |
| GT W12 (575PS) | 2011–2015 | 2011–2015 |
| GT W12 (590PS) | 2015–2018 | 2015–2018 |
| GT Speed (625PS) | 2012–2014 | 2013–2014 |
| GT Speed (635PS) | 2014–2016 | 2014–2016 |
| GT Speed (642PS) | 2016–2018 | 2016–2018 |
| Supersports | 2017–2018 | 2017–2018 |

==== Engines ====
Petrol engines
| Model | Years | Type/code | Power at rpm, Torque at rpm |
|---|---|---|---|
| GT V8 | 2013–2018 | 3,993 cc (243.7 cu in) V8 twin turbo | 507 PS (373 kW; 500 hp) at 6,000, 660 N⋅m (487 lb⋅ft) at 1,700 |
| GT V8 S | 2014–2018 | 3,993 cc (243.7 cu in) V8 twin turbo | 528 PS (388 kW; 521 hp) at 6,000, 680 N⋅m (502 lb⋅ft) at 1,700 |
| GT3-R | 2015 | 3,993 cc (243.7 cu in) V8 twin turbo | 580 PS (427 kW; 572 hp) at 6,000, 700 N⋅m (516 lb⋅ft) at 1,700 (592 HP & 553 Ft-Lbs for 15 sec. in overboost) |
| GT W12 | 2011–2015 | 5,998 cc (366.0 cu in) W12 twin turbo | 575 PS (423 kW; 567 hp) at 6,000, 700 N⋅m (516 lb⋅ft) at 1,700 |
| GT W12 | 2015–2018 | 5,998 cc (366.0 cu in) W12 twin turbo | 590 PS (434 kW; 582 hp) at 6000, 720 N⋅m (531 lb⋅ft) at 1,700 |
| GT Speed | 2012–2014 | 5,998 cc (366.0 cu in) W12 twin turbo | 625 PS (460 kW; 616 hp) at 6,000, 800 N⋅m (590 lb⋅ft) at 1,700 |
| GT Speed | 2014–2016 | 5,998 cc (366.0 cu in) W12 twin turbo | 635 PS (467 kW; 626 hp) at 6,000, 820 N⋅m (605 lb⋅ft) at 1,700 |
| GT Speed | 2016–2018 | 5,998 cc (366.0 cu in) W12 twin turbo | 642 PS (472 kW; 633 hp) at 6000, 840 N⋅m (620 lb⋅ft) at 1,700 |
| Supersports | 2017–2018 | 5,998 cc (366.0 cu in) W12 twin turbo | 710 PS (522 kW; 700 hp) at 5900, 1,017 N⋅m (750 lb⋅ft) at 2050–4500 |

In 2015 for the 2016 model year GT W12 models gained a new engine design which included variable cylinder management to reduce emissions and at the same time had a power increase to 590PS, helping to reduce the 0–100 km/h time.

In 2014, for the 2015 Model year GT Speed models gained at additional 10PS (635 in total) and in 2015 for the 2016 model year this was increased again by 8PS (642PS) with both these steps increasing the top speed and reducing the 0–100 km/h time.

Beginning with the 2011 model year, all Bentley Continental range vehicles support the use of petrol and E85 bioethanol fuel types in all markets, including North America.

==== Transmissions ====
Petrol engines
| Model | Years | Types |
|---|---|---|
| GT V8 | 2013–2018 | 8-speed ZF transmission with Quickshift and steering column mounted gearshift paddles |
| GT V8 S | 2014–2018 | 8-speed ZF transmission with Quickshift and steering column mounted gearshift paddles |
| GT3-R | 2015 | 8-speed ZF automatic with Quickshift. Separate GT3-R specific normal & S modes. Steering-column-mounted paddle shift. |
| GT W12 | 2011–2012 | 6-speed ZF transmission with Quickshift and steering column mounted gearshift paddles |
| GT W12 | 2013–2018 | 8-speed ZF transmission with Quickshift and steering column mounted gearshift paddles |
| GT Speed | 2012–2018 | 8-speed ZF transmission with Quickshift and steering column mounted gearshift paddles |
| Supersports | 2017–2018 | 8-speed ZF transmission with Quickshift and steering column mounted gearshift paddles |

The 6 Speed ZF transmission was only ever offered for 18 months of this generations' production run and was replaced by the ZF 8-speed transmission from the 2013 model year, this transmission first being introduced on the Mulsanne.

=== Third generation (2018–2024) ===
==== Engines ====
Petrol engines
| Model | Years | Type/code | Power at rpm, Torque at rpm |
|---|---|---|---|
| GT W12 | 2018–2021 | 5,950 cc (363 cu in) W12 twin turbo | 635 PS (467 kW; 626 hp) at 6,000 RPM. 900 N⋅m (664 lb⋅ft) at 1,350–4,500 RPM. |
| GT V8 | 2019–2024 | 3,993 cc (243.7 cu in) V8 twin turbo | 550 PS (405 kW; 542 hp) at 6,000 RPM, 770 N⋅m (568 lb⋅ft) at 2,000–4,000 RPM. |
| GT MULLINER | 2020–2024 | 5,950 cc (363 cu in) W12 twin turbo | 635 PS (467 kW; 626 hp) at 6,000 RPM. 900 N⋅m (664 lb⋅ft) at 1,350–4,500 RPM. |
| GT MULLINER V8 | 2020–2024 | 3,993 cc (243.7 cu in) V8 twin turbo | 550 PS (405 kW; 542 hp) at 6,000 RPM, 770 N⋅m (568 lb⋅ft) at 2,000–4,000 RPM. |
| GT Speed | 2021–2024 | 5,950 cc (363 cu in) W12 twin turbo | 659 PS (485 kW; 650 hp) at 6,000 RPM, 900 N⋅m (664 lb⋅ft) at 1,500–5,000 RPM. |

==== Transmissions ====
Petrol engines
| Model | Years | Types |
|---|---|---|
| GT W12 / GT Mulliner W12 | 2018–2021 (W12); 2020–2024 (Mulliner W12) | 8-speed Bentley Dual-Clutch transmission |
| GT V8 / GT Mulliner V8 | 2019–2024 | 8-speed Bentley Dual-Clutch transmission |
| GT Speed | 2021–2024 | 8-speed Bentley Dual-Clutch transmission |

=== Fourth generation (2024–present) ===
==== Engines ====
Petrol engines
| Model | Years | Type/code | Power at rpm, Torque at rpm |
|---|---|---|---|
| GT Speed High Performance | 2024– | 3,996 cc (243.9 cu in) V8 twin turbo PHEV | 680 PS (500 kW; 671 hp) at 6,250 RPM, 930 N⋅m (686 lb⋅ft) at 2,300–4,500 RPM. |
| GT Speed Ultra Performance | 2024– | 3,996 cc (243.9 cu in) V8 twin turbo PHEV | 782 PS (575 kW; 771 hp) at 6,000 RPM, 1,000 N⋅m (738 lb⋅ft) at 2,000–4,500 RPM. |

==== Transmissions ====
Petrol engines
| Model | Years | Types |
|---|---|---|
| GT Speed High Performance | 2024– | 8-speed Bentley Dual-Clutch transmission |
| GT Speed Ultra Performance | 2024– | 8-speed Bentley Dual-Clutch transmission |

== Appearance in media ==
A modified Bentley Continental GT appeared in Season 4, Episode 2 (A Massive Hunt) of the Amazon Prime Video original series The Grand Tour, and later a cameo reappearance in Clarkson's Farm. It was driven by Jeremy Clarkson, and was modified car with long-travel shock absorbers, armor-plated steel running on the belly of the car from the front to the back, big chunky tyres, a snorkel, off-road lights, and also repainted the car from blue to green. The car is currently on display at the Bentley headquarters.

== Technically related ==
- Bentley Flying Spur (2005)
- Volkswagen Phaeton
- Porsche Panamera

== See also ==
- Rolls-Royce Phantom Drophead Coupé
- Rolls-Royce Wraith (2013)
- Rolls-Royce Spectre
- Mercedes-Benz CL-Class/Mercedes-Benz S-Class Coupé
