= 2018 Intercontinental GT Challenge =

Sports car racing series

The 2018 Intercontinental GT Challenge was the third season of the Intercontinental GT Challenge. The season featured four rounds, starting with the Liqui Moly Bathurst 12 Hour on 4 February and concluding with the California 8 Hours on 28 October. Markus Winkelhock was the defending Drivers' champion and Audi was the defending Manufacturers' champion.

The series reverted to rules of the inaugural season, where each manufacturer was permitted to nominate up to four cars in each event. In 2017 all cars and drivers scored points towards the championship.

== Calendar ==
At the annual press conference during the 2017 24 Hours of Spa on 28 July, the Stéphane Ratel Organisation announced the 2018 calendar. Suzuka was added to the schedule, replacing the Sepang 12 Hours, which was cancelled the season before. On 25 November 2017, it was announced the race at Laguna Seca was moved a week.

Round	Race	Circuit	Date	Report
1	Bathurst 12 Hour	Mount Panorama Circuit, Bathurst, Australia	4 February	Report
2	24 Hours of Spa	Circuit de Spa-Francorchamps, Stavelot, Belgium	28–29 July	Report
3	Suzuka 10 Hours	Suzuka Circuit, Suzuka, Japan	26 August	Report
4	California 8 Hours	WeatherTech Raceway Laguna Seca, Monterey, United States	28 October	Report

Also part of the Blancpain GT Series Endurance Cup

== Entry list ==
Manufacturer	Team	Car	No.	Drivers	Class	Rounds
Audi	(Belgium) / Audi Sport Team WRT (Note: Cars No. 1, 2, 19, 37, 39 and 66 entered as Audi Sport Team WRT. Car No. 17 entered as Belgian Audi Club Team WRT at Round 2 and as Audi Sport Team WRT at Rounds 3 and 4.); (Belgium) / Belgian Audi Club Team WRT	R8 LMS	1	(Germany) Christopher Mies	P	2
Audi	(Belgium) / Audi Sport Team WRT; (Belgium) / Belgian Audi Club Team WRT	R8 LMS	1	(Spain) Alex Riberas	P	2
Audi	(Belgium) / Audi Sport Team WRT; (Belgium) / Belgian Audi Club Team WRT	R8 LMS	1	(Belgium) Dries Vanthoor	P	2
Audi	(Belgium) / Audi Sport Team WRT; (Belgium) / Belgian Audi Club Team WRT	R8 LMS	2	(Netherlands) Robin Frijns	P	2
Audi	(Belgium) / Audi Sport Team WRT; (Belgium) / Belgian Audi Club Team WRT	R8 LMS	2	(Switzerland) Nico Müller	P	2
Audi	(Belgium) / Audi Sport Team WRT; (Belgium) / Belgian Audi Club Team WRT	R8 LMS	2	(Germany) René Rast	P	2
Audi	(Belgium) / Audi Sport Team WRT; (Belgium) / Belgian Audi Club Team WRT	R8 LMS	17	(United Kingdom) Stuart Leonard	P	2–4
Audi	(Belgium) / Audi Sport Team WRT; (Belgium) / Belgian Audi Club Team WRT	R8 LMS	17	(Switzerland) Marcel Fässler	P	2
Audi	(Belgium) / Audi Sport Team WRT; (Belgium) / Belgian Audi Club Team WRT	R8 LMS	17	(Brazil) Daniel Serra	P	2
Audi	(Belgium) / Audi Sport Team WRT; (Belgium) / Belgian Audi Club Team WRT	R8 LMS	17	(South Africa) Sheldon van der Linde	P	3–4
Audi	(Belgium) / Audi Sport Team WRT; (Belgium) / Belgian Audi Club Team WRT	R8 LMS	17	(United Kingdom) Jake Dennis	P	3
Audi	(Belgium) / Audi Sport Team WRT; (Belgium) / Belgian Audi Club Team WRT	R8 LMS	17	(Spain) Alex Riberas	P	4
Audi	(Belgium) / Audi Sport Team WRT; (Belgium) / Belgian Audi Club Team WRT	R8 LMS	19	(Netherlands) Robin Frijns	P	4
Audi	(Belgium) / Audi Sport Team WRT; (Belgium) / Belgian Audi Club Team WRT	R8 LMS	19	(Belgium) Dries Vanthoor	P	4
Audi	(Belgium) / Audi Sport Team WRT; (Belgium) / Belgian Audi Club Team WRT	R8 LMS	19	(Germany) Markus Winkelhock	P	4
Audi	(Belgium) / Audi Sport Team WRT; (Belgium) / Belgian Audi Club Team WRT	R8 LMS	37	(Netherlands) Robin Frijns	P	1
Audi	(Belgium) / Audi Sport Team WRT; (Belgium) / Belgian Audi Club Team WRT	R8 LMS	37	(United Kingdom) Stuart Leonard	P	1
Audi	(Belgium) / Audi Sport Team WRT; (Belgium) / Belgian Audi Club Team WRT	R8 LMS	37	(Belgium) Dries Vanthoor	P	1
Audi	(Belgium) / Audi Sport Team WRT; (Belgium) / Belgian Audi Club Team WRT	R8 LMS	39	(Canada) Paul Dalla Lana	PA	1
Audi	(Belgium) / Audi Sport Team WRT; (Belgium) / Belgian Audi Club Team WRT	R8 LMS	39	(Australia) Will Davison	PA	1
Audi	(Belgium) / Audi Sport Team WRT; (Belgium) / Belgian Audi Club Team WRT	R8 LMS	39	(Portugal) Pedro Lamy	PA	1
Audi	(Belgium) / Audi Sport Team WRT; (Belgium) / Belgian Audi Club Team WRT	R8 LMS	39	(Austria) Mathias Lauda	PA	1
Audi	(Belgium) / Audi Sport Team WRT; (Belgium) / Belgian Audi Club Team WRT	R8 LMS	66	(Germany) Christopher Mies	P	3
Audi	(Belgium) / Audi Sport Team WRT; (Belgium) / Belgian Audi Club Team WRT	R8 LMS	66	(Belgium) Dries Vanthoor	P	3
Audi	(Belgium) / Audi Sport Team WRT; (Belgium) / Belgian Audi Club Team WRT	R8 LMS	66	(Belgium) Frédéric Vervisch	P	3
Audi	(China) Audi Sport Team Absolute Racing	R8 LMS	6	(Germany) Christopher Haase	P	3
Audi	(China) Audi Sport Team Absolute Racing	R8 LMS	6	(South Africa) Kelvin van der Linde	P	3
Audi	(China) Audi Sport Team Absolute Racing	R8 LMS	6	(Germany) Markus Winkelhock	P	3
Audi	(Japan) Audi Sport Team Hitotsuyama	R8 LMS	21	(United Kingdom) Richard Lyons	P	3
Audi	(Japan) Audi Sport Team Hitotsuyama	R8 LMS	21	(Belgium) Alessio Picariello	P	3
Audi	(Japan) Audi Sport Team Hitotsuyama	R8 LMS	21	(Japan) Ryuichiro Tomita	P	3
Audi	(Australia) Audi Sport Team MPC	R8 LMS	22	(South Africa) Kelvin van der Linde	P	1
Audi	(Australia) Audi Sport Team MPC	R8 LMS	22	(Australia) Garth Tander	P	1
Audi	(Australia) Audi Sport Team MPC	R8 LMS	22	(Belgium) Frédéric Vervisch	P	1
Audi	(Australia) Audi Sport Team MPC	R8 LMS	74	(Germany) Christopher Haase	P	1
Audi	(Australia) Audi Sport Team MPC	R8 LMS	74	(Germany) Christopher Mies	P	1
Audi	(Australia) Audi Sport Team MPC	R8 LMS	74	(Germany) Markus Winkelhock	P	1
Audi	(France) Audi Sport Team Saintéloc	R8 LMS	25	(Germany) Christopher Haase	P	2
Audi	(France) Audi Sport Team Saintéloc	R8 LMS	25	(Belgium) Frédéric Vervisch	P	2
Audi	(France) Audi Sport Team Saintéloc	R8 LMS	25	(Germany) Markus Winkelhock	P	2
Audi	(Germany) Audi Sport Team Land	R8 LMS	29	(Germany) Christopher Haase	P	4
Audi	(Germany) Audi Sport Team Land	R8 LMS	29	(South Africa) Kelvin van der Linde	P	4
Audi	(Germany) Audi Sport Team Land	R8 LMS	29	(Germany) Christopher Mies	P	4
Bentley	(United Kingdom) Bentley Team M-Sport	Continental GT3 (2018)	(0)7	(France) Jules Gounon	P	2–4
Bentley	(United Kingdom) Bentley Team M-Sport	Continental GT3 (2018)	(0)7	(United Kingdom) Steven Kane	P	2–4
Bentley	(United Kingdom) Bentley Team M-Sport	Continental GT3 (2018)	(0)7	(South Africa) Jordan Pepper	P	2–4
Bentley	(United Kingdom) Bentley Team M-Sport	Continental GT3 (2018)	(0)8	(Monaco) Vincent Abril	P	2–4
Bentley	(United Kingdom) Bentley Team M-Sport	Continental GT3 (2018)	(0)8	(Spain) Andy Soucek	P	2–4
Bentley	(United Kingdom) Bentley Team M-Sport	Continental GT3 (2018)	(0)8	(Belgium) Maxime Soulet	P	2–4
Bentley	(United Kingdom) Bentley Team M-Sport	Continental GT3 (2016)	17	(France) Jules Gounon	P	1
Bentley	(United Kingdom) Bentley Team M-Sport	Continental GT3 (2016)	17	(United Kingdom) Steven Kane	P	1
Bentley	(United Kingdom) Bentley Team M-Sport	Continental GT3 (2016)	17	(United Kingdom) Guy Smith	P	1
Bentley	(United Kingdom) Bentley Team M-Sport	Continental GT3 (2016)	18	(Monaco) Vincent Abril	P	1
Bentley	(United Kingdom) Bentley Team M-Sport	Continental GT3 (2016)	18	(Spain) Andy Soucek	P	1
Bentley	(United Kingdom) Bentley Team M-Sport	Continental GT3 (2016)	18	(Belgium) Maxime Soulet	P	1
Bentley	(United States) K-PAX Racing	Continental GT3 (2016)	9	(Brazil) Rodrigo Baptista	P	4
Bentley	(United States) K-PAX Racing	Continental GT3 (2016)	9	(Portugal) Álvaro Parente	P	4
Bentley	(United States) K-PAX Racing	Continental GT3 (2016)	9	(United States) Bryan Sellers	P	4
Bentley	(United Kingdom) Team Parker Racing	Continental GT3 (2016)	31	(United Kingdom) Andy Meyrick	PA	2
Bentley	(United Kingdom) Team Parker Racing	Continental GT3 (2016)	31	(United Kingdom) Seb Morris	PA	2
Bentley	(United Kingdom) Team Parker Racing	Continental GT3 (2016)	31	(United Kingdom) Derek Pierce	PA	2
Bentley	(United Kingdom) Team Parker Racing	Continental GT3 (2016)	31	(United Kingdom) Rob Smith	PA	2
McLaren	(Australia) YNA Autosport	650S GT3	47	(New Zealand) Scott McLaughlin	PA	1
McLaren	(Australia) YNA Autosport	650S GT3	47	(Australia) Fraser Ross	PA	1
McLaren	(Australia) YNA Autosport	650S GT3	47	(United Kingdom) Andrew Watson	PA	1
McLaren	(Australia) YNA Autosport	650S GT3	47	(United Kingdom) Alexander West	PA	1
McLaren	(Australia) YNA Autosport	650S GT3	58	(New Zealand) Shane van Gisbergen	P	1
McLaren	(Australia) YNA Autosport	650S GT3	58	(France) Côme Ledogar	P	1
McLaren	(Australia) YNA Autosport	650S GT3	58	(Australia) Craig Lowndes	P	1
McLaren	(United Kingdom) Garage 59	650S GT3	58	(United Kingdom) Ben Barnicoat	P	2–3
McLaren	(United Kingdom) Garage 59	650S GT3	58	(France) Côme Ledogar	P	2–3
McLaren	(United Kingdom) Garage 59	650S GT3	58	(France) Olivier Pla	P	2
McLaren	(United Kingdom) Garage 59	650S GT3	58	(United Kingdom) Andrew Watson	P	3
McLaren	(United Kingdom) Garage 59	650S GT3	188	(United Kingdom) Chris Goodwin	Am	2
McLaren	(United Kingdom) Garage 59	650S GT3	188	(United Kingdom) Chris Harris	Am	2
McLaren	(United Kingdom) Garage 59	650S GT3	188	(United Kingdom) Andrew Watson	Am	2
McLaren	(United Kingdom) Garage 59	650S GT3	188	(United Kingdom) Alexander West	Am	2
Mercedes-AMG	(Japan) Mercedes-AMG Team Good Smile	AMG GT3	00	(Japan) Tatsuya Kataoka	P	3
Mercedes-AMG	(Japan) Mercedes-AMG Team Good Smile	AMG GT3	00	(Japan) Kamui Kobayashi	P	3
Mercedes-AMG	(Japan) Mercedes-AMG Team Good Smile	AMG GT3	00	(Japan) Nobuteru Taniguchi	P	3
Mercedes-AMG	(Germany) Mercedes-AMG Team Black Falcon	AMG GT3	4	(Netherlands) Yelmer Buurman	P	2
Mercedes-AMG	(Germany) Mercedes-AMG Team Black Falcon	AMG GT3	4	(Germany) Maro Engel	P	2
Mercedes-AMG	(Germany) Mercedes-AMG Team Black Falcon	AMG GT3	4	(Germany) Luca Stolz	P	2
Mercedes-AMG	(Australia) / Scott Taylor Motorsport (Note: Car No. 8 entered as Scott Taylor Motorsport and car No. 75 entered as Mercedes-AMG Team SunEnergy1 Racing.); (Australia) / Mercedes-AMG Team SunEnergy1 Racing	AMG GT3	8	(New Zealand) Craig Baird	PA	1
Mercedes-AMG	(Australia) / Scott Taylor Motorsport; (Australia) / Mercedes-AMG Team SunEnergy1 Racing	AMG GT3	8	(Australia) Tony D'Alberto	PA	1
Mercedes-AMG	(Australia) / Scott Taylor Motorsport; (Australia) / Mercedes-AMG Team SunEnergy1 Racing	AMG GT3	8	(Australia) Max Twigg	PA	1
Mercedes-AMG	(Australia) / Scott Taylor Motorsport; (Australia) / Mercedes-AMG Team SunEnergy1 Racing	AMG GT3	75	(Australia) Kenny Habul	P	1
Mercedes-AMG	(Australia) / Scott Taylor Motorsport; (Australia) / Mercedes-AMG Team SunEnergy1 Racing	AMG GT3	75	(Italy) Raffaele Marciello	P	1
Mercedes-AMG	(Australia) / Scott Taylor Motorsport; (Australia) / Mercedes-AMG Team SunEnergy1 Racing	AMG GT3	75	(France) Tristan Vautier	P	1
Mercedes-AMG	(Australia) / Scott Taylor Motorsport; (Australia) / Mercedes-AMG Team SunEnergy1 Racing	AMG GT3	75	(Australia) Jamie Whincup	P	1
Mercedes-AMG	(United Kingdom) / Strakka Racing (Note: Car No. 42 entered as Strakka Racing and cars No. 43, 55 and 56 entered as Mercedes-AMG Team Strakka Racing. Car No. 44 entered as Mercedes-AMG Team Strakka Racing at Round 3 and as Strakka Racing at Round 4.); (United Kingdom) / Mercedes-AMG Team Strakka Racing	AMG GT3	42	(Italy) David Fumanelli	PA	2–4
Mercedes-AMG	(United Kingdom) / Strakka Racing; (United Kingdom) / Mercedes-AMG Team Strakka Racing	AMG GT3	42	(United Kingdom) Nick Leventis	PA	2–4
Mercedes-AMG	(United Kingdom) / Strakka Racing; (United Kingdom) / Mercedes-AMG Team Strakka Racing	AMG GT3	42	(United Kingdom) Chris Buncombe	PA	2
Mercedes-AMG	(United Kingdom) / Strakka Racing; (United Kingdom) / Mercedes-AMG Team Strakka Racing	AMG GT3	42	(United Kingdom) Lewis Williamson	PA	2
Mercedes-AMG	(United Kingdom) / Strakka Racing; (United Kingdom) / Mercedes-AMG Team Strakka Racing	AMG GT3	42	(Brazil) Felipe Fraga	PA	3–4
Mercedes-AMG	(United Kingdom) / Strakka Racing; (United Kingdom) / Mercedes-AMG Team Strakka Racing	AMG GT3	43	(Germany) Maximilian Götz	P	2–4
Mercedes-AMG	(United Kingdom) / Strakka Racing; (United Kingdom) / Mercedes-AMG Team Strakka Racing	AMG GT3	43	(Portugal) Álvaro Parente	P	2–3
Mercedes-AMG	(United Kingdom) / Strakka Racing; (United Kingdom) / Mercedes-AMG Team Strakka Racing	AMG GT3	43	(Germany) Maximilian Buhk	P	2
Mercedes-AMG	(United Kingdom) / Strakka Racing; (United Kingdom) / Mercedes-AMG Team Strakka Racing	AMG GT3	43	(United Kingdom) Lewis Williamson	P	3–4
Mercedes-AMG	(United Kingdom) / Strakka Racing; (United Kingdom) / Mercedes-AMG Team Strakka Racing	AMG GT3	43	(Italy) Raffaele Marciello	P	4
Mercedes-AMG	(United Kingdom) / Strakka Racing; (United Kingdom) / Mercedes-AMG Team Strakka Racing	AMG GT3	44	(France) Adrien Tambay	P	3–4
Mercedes-AMG	(United Kingdom) / Strakka Racing; (United Kingdom) / Mercedes-AMG Team Strakka Racing	AMG GT3	44	(Germany) Maximilian Buhk	P	3
Mercedes-AMG	(United Kingdom) / Strakka Racing; (United Kingdom) / Mercedes-AMG Team Strakka Racing	AMG GT3	44	(United Kingdom) Oliver Rowland	P	3
Mercedes-AMG	(United Kingdom) / Strakka Racing; (United Kingdom) / Mercedes-AMG Team Strakka Racing	AMG GT3	44	(United Kingdom) Jack Hawksworth	P	4
Mercedes-AMG	(United Kingdom) / Strakka Racing; (United Kingdom) / Mercedes-AMG Team Strakka Racing	AMG GT3	44	(Germany) Christian Vietoris	P	4
Mercedes-AMG	(United Kingdom) / Strakka Racing; (United Kingdom) / Mercedes-AMG Team Strakka Racing	AMG GT3	55	(Italy) David Fumanelli	PA	1
Mercedes-AMG	(United Kingdom) / Strakka Racing; (United Kingdom) / Mercedes-AMG Team Strakka Racing	AMG GT3	55	(United Kingdom) Nick Leventis	PA	1
Mercedes-AMG	(United Kingdom) / Strakka Racing; (United Kingdom) / Mercedes-AMG Team Strakka Racing	AMG GT3	55	(Australia) Cameron Waters	PA	1
Mercedes-AMG	(United Kingdom) / Strakka Racing; (United Kingdom) / Mercedes-AMG Team Strakka Racing	AMG GT3	55	(United Kingdom) Lewis Williamson	PA	1
Mercedes-AMG	(United Kingdom) / Strakka Racing; (United Kingdom) / Mercedes-AMG Team Strakka Racing	AMG GT3	56	(Germany) Maximilian Buhk	P	1
Mercedes-AMG	(United Kingdom) / Strakka Racing; (United Kingdom) / Mercedes-AMG Team Strakka Racing	AMG GT3	56	(Germany) Maximilian Götz	P	1
Mercedes-AMG	(United Kingdom) / Strakka Racing; (United Kingdom) / Mercedes-AMG Team Strakka Racing	AMG GT3	56	(Portugal) Álvaro Parente	P	1
Mercedes-AMG	(United States) SunEnergy1 Racing	AMG GT3	75	(Canada) Mikaël Grenier	PA	3
Mercedes-AMG	(United States) SunEnergy1 Racing	AMG GT3	75	(Australia) Kenny Habul	PA	3
Mercedes-AMG	(United States) SunEnergy1 Racing	AMG GT3	75	(Germany) Luca Stolz	PA	3
Mercedes-AMG	(Germany) / Mercedes-AMG Team MANN-FILTER (Note: Car No. 84 entered as Mercedes-AMG Team MANN-FILTER and car No. 175 entered as SunEnergy1 Team HTP Motorsport.); (Germany) / SunEnergy1 Team HTP Motorsport	AMG GT3	84	(Switzerland) Edoardo Mortara	P	2
Mercedes-AMG	(Germany) / Mercedes-AMG Team MANN-FILTER; (Germany) / SunEnergy1 Team HTP Motorsport	AMG GT3	84	(United Kingdom) Gary Paffett	P	2
Mercedes-AMG	(Germany) / Mercedes-AMG Team MANN-FILTER; (Germany) / SunEnergy1 Team HTP Motorsport	AMG GT3	84	(Netherlands) Renger van der Zande	P	2
Mercedes-AMG	(Germany) / Mercedes-AMG Team MANN-FILTER; (Germany) / SunEnergy1 Team HTP Motorsport	AMG GT3	175	(Australia) Kenny Habul	PA	2
Mercedes-AMG	(Germany) / Mercedes-AMG Team MANN-FILTER; (Germany) / SunEnergy1 Team HTP Motorsport	AMG GT3	175	(Germany) Thomas Jäger	PA	2
Mercedes-AMG	(Germany) / Mercedes-AMG Team MANN-FILTER; (Germany) / SunEnergy1 Team HTP Motorsport	AMG GT3	175	(Austria) Martin Konrad	PA	2
Mercedes-AMG	(Germany) / Mercedes-AMG Team MANN-FILTER; (Germany) / SunEnergy1 Team HTP Motorsport	AMG GT3	175	(Germany) Bernd Schneider	PA	2
Mercedes-AMG	(France) / SunEnergy1 Racing (Note: Car No. 75 entered as SunEnergy1 Racing, car No. 88 entered as Mercedes-AMG Team AKKA ASP and car No. 175 entered as Mercedes-AMG Team SunEnergy1 Racing.); (France) / Mercedes-AMG Team AKKA ASP; (France) / Mercedes-AMG Team SunEnergy1 Racing	AMG GT3	75	(Canada) Mikaël Grenier	PA	4
Mercedes-AMG	(France) / SunEnergy1 Racing; (France) / Mercedes-AMG Team AKKA ASP; (France) / Mercedes-AMG Team SunEnergy1 Racing	AMG GT3	75	(Australia) Kenny Habul	PA	4
Mercedes-AMG	(France) / SunEnergy1 Racing; (France) / Mercedes-AMG Team AKKA ASP; (France) / Mercedes-AMG Team SunEnergy1 Racing	AMG GT3	75	(Germany) Luca Stolz	PA	4
Mercedes-AMG	(France) / SunEnergy1 Racing; (France) / Mercedes-AMG Team AKKA ASP; (France) / Mercedes-AMG Team SunEnergy1 Racing	AMG GT3	88	(Spain) Daniel Juncadella	P	2
Mercedes-AMG	(France) / SunEnergy1 Racing; (France) / Mercedes-AMG Team AKKA ASP; (France) / Mercedes-AMG Team SunEnergy1 Racing	AMG GT3	88	(Italy) Raffaele Marciello	P	2
Mercedes-AMG	(France) / SunEnergy1 Racing; (France) / Mercedes-AMG Team AKKA ASP; (France) / Mercedes-AMG Team SunEnergy1 Racing	AMG GT3	88	(France) Tristan Vautier	P	2
Mercedes-AMG	(France) / SunEnergy1 Racing; (France) / Mercedes-AMG Team AKKA ASP; (France) / Mercedes-AMG Team SunEnergy1 Racing	AMG GT3	175	(Germany) Maximilian Buhk	P	4
Mercedes-AMG	(France) / SunEnergy1 Racing; (France) / Mercedes-AMG Team AKKA ASP; (France) / Mercedes-AMG Team SunEnergy1 Racing	AMG GT3	175	(Germany) Maro Engel	P	4
Mercedes-AMG	(France) / SunEnergy1 Racing; (France) / Mercedes-AMG Team AKKA ASP; (France) / Mercedes-AMG Team SunEnergy1 Racing	AMG GT3	175	(France) Tristan Vautier	P	4
Mercedes-AMG	(Hong Kong) Mercedes-AMG Team GruppeM Racing	AMG GT3	888	(Germany) Maro Engel	P	3
Mercedes-AMG	(Hong Kong) Mercedes-AMG Team GruppeM Racing	AMG GT3	888	(Italy) Raffaele Marciello	P	3
Mercedes-AMG	(Hong Kong) Mercedes-AMG Team GruppeM Racing	AMG GT3	888	(France) Tristan Vautier	P	3
Porsche	(Japan) D'station Racing	911 GT3 R	7	(New Zealand) Earl Bamber	P	3
Porsche	(Japan) D'station Racing	911 GT3 R	7	(Japan) Tomonobu Fujii	P	3
Porsche	(Japan) D'station Racing	911 GT3 R	7	(Germany) Sven Müller	P	3
Porsche	(United States) Competition Motorsports	911 GT3 R	12	(United States) David Calvert-Jones	PA	1
Porsche	(United States) Competition Motorsports	911 GT3 R	12	(Australia) Matt Campbell	PA	1
Porsche	(United States) Competition Motorsports	911 GT3 R	12	(Australia) Alex Davison	PA	1
Porsche	(United States) Competition Motorsports	911 GT3 R	12	(United States) Patrick Long	PA	1
Porsche	(Germany) KÜS Team75 Bernhard	911 GT3 R	117	(New Zealand) Earl Bamber	P	2
Porsche	(Germany) KÜS Team75 Bernhard	911 GT3 R	117	(Germany) Timo Bernhard	P	2
Porsche	(Germany) KÜS Team75 Bernhard	911 GT3 R	117	(Belgium) Laurens Vanthoor	P	2
Porsche	(United States) Black Swan Racing	911 GT3 R	54(0)	(Netherlands) Jeroen Bleekemolen	PA	1–3
Porsche	(United States) Black Swan Racing	911 GT3 R	54(0)	(United States) Tim Pappas	PA	1–3
Porsche	(United States) Black Swan Racing	911 GT3 R	54(0)	(Germany) Marc Lieb	PA	1–2
Porsche	(United States) Black Swan Racing	911 GT3 R	54(0)	(Germany) Luca Stolz	PA	1
Porsche	(United States) Black Swan Racing	911 GT3 R	54(0)	(United States) Marc Miller	PA	2–3
Porsche	(United States) Black Swan Racing	911 GT3 R	54(0)	(Netherlands) Jeroen Bleekemolen	P	4
Porsche	(United States) Black Swan Racing	911 GT3 R	54(0)	(United States) Patrick Long	P	4
Porsche	(United States) Black Swan Racing	911 GT3 R	54(0)	(United States) Tim Pappas	P	4
Porsche	(Germany) Manthey Racing	911 GT3 R	911	(France) Romain Dumas	P	1–3
Porsche	(Germany) Manthey Racing	911 GT3 R	911	(France) Frédéric Makowiecki	P	1–3
Porsche	(Germany) Manthey Racing	911 GT3 R	911	(Germany) Dirk Werner	P	1–3
Porsche	(United States) Wright Motorsports	911 GT3 R	911	(France) Romain Dumas	P	4
Porsche	(United States) Wright Motorsports	911 GT3 R	911	(France) Frédéric Makowiecki	P	4
Porsche	(United States) Wright Motorsports	911 GT3 R	911	(Germany) Dirk Werner	P	4
Porsche	(Hong Kong) Craft-Bamboo Racing	911 GT3 R	991	(France) Kévin Estre	P	1, 3
Porsche	(Hong Kong) Craft-Bamboo Racing	911 GT3 R	991	(Belgium) Laurens Vanthoor	P	1, 3
Porsche	(Hong Kong) Craft-Bamboo Racing	911 GT3 R	991	(New Zealand) Earl Bamber	P	1
Porsche	(Hong Kong) Craft-Bamboo Racing	911 GT3 R	991	(France) Mathieu Jaminet	P	3
Porsche	(Germany) Herberth Motorsport	911 GT3 R	991	(Germany) Edward Lewis Brauner	Am	2
Porsche	(Germany) Herberth Motorsport	911 GT3 R	991	(Germany) Jürgen Häring	Am	2
Porsche	(Germany) Herberth Motorsport	911 GT3 R	991	(Germany) Alfred Renauer	Am	2
Porsche	(Germany) Herberth Motorsport	911 GT3 R	991	(Germany) Wolfgang Triller	Am	2

Icon	Class
P	Pro Cup
PA	Pro-Am Cup
Am	Am Cup

Cars not nominated by a manufacturer and therefore not eligible for manufacturer or overall driver points
Drivers participating in championship for Bronze-rated drivers

== Race results ==
Rnd.	Circuit	Pole position	IGTC Winners	Bronze Winners	Winning Manufacturer
1	(Australia) Bathurst	(Australia) No. 22 Audi Sport Team MPC (Note: Chaz Mostert took Pole position in the No. 43 BMW Team Schnitzer car, but Kelvin van der Linde was the highest qualified Intercontinental GT Challenge driver.)	(Belgium) No. 37 Audi Sport Team WRT	(Australia) No. 75 Mercedes-AMG Team SunEnergy1 Racing	Audi
1	(Australia) Bathurst	(South Africa) Kelvin van der Linde (Australia) Garth Tander (Belgium) Frédéric Vervisch	(Netherlands) Robin Frijns (United Kingdom) Stuart Leonard (Belgium) Dries Vanthoor	(Australia) Kenny Habul	Audi
2	(Belgium) Spa-Francorchamps	(Belgium) No. 2 Audi Sport Team WRT (Note: Maxime Martin took Pole position in the No. 62 R-Motorsport car, but Nico Müller was the highest qualified Intercontinental GT Challenge driver.)	(France) No. 25 Audi Sport Team Saintéloc (Note: Tom Blomqvist, Philipp Eng and Christian Krognes won the race in the No. 34 Walkenhorst Motorsport car, but Christopher Haase, Frédéric Vervisch and Markus Winkelhock were the highest classified Intercontinental GT Challenge drivers.)	(United Kingdom) No. 42 Strakka Racing	Audi
2	(Belgium) Spa-Francorchamps	(Netherlands) Robin Frijns (Switzerland) Nico Müller (Germany) René Rast	(Germany) Christopher Haase (Belgium) Frédéric Vervisch (Germany) Markus Winkelhock	(United Kingdom) Nick Leventis	Audi
3	(Japan) Suzuka	(Hong Kong) No. 888 Mercedes-AMG Team GruppeM Racing (Note: Nick Foster took Pole position in the No. 28 HubAuto Corsa car, but Raffaele Marciello was the highest qualified Intercontinental GT Challenge driver.)	(Hong Kong) No. 888 Mercedes-AMG Team GruppeM Racing	(United States) No. 75 SunEnergy 1 Racing	Mercedes-AMG
3	(Japan) Suzuka	(Germany) Maro Engel (Italy) Raffaele Marciello (France) Tristan Vautier	(Germany) Maro Engel (Italy) Raffaele Marciello (France) Tristan Vautier	(Australia) Kenny Habul	Mercedes-AMG
4	(United States) Laguna Seca	(Germany) No. 29 Audi Sport Team Land	(Germany) No. 29 Audi Sport Team Land	(United Kingdom) No. 63 DXDT Racing	Audi
4	(United States) Laguna Seca	(Germany) Christopher Haase (South Africa) Kelvin van der Linde (Germany) Christopher Mies	(Germany) Christopher Haase (South Africa) Kelvin van der Linde (Germany) Christopher Mies	(United States) David Askew	Audi

NOTE: California 8 Hours results altered 26 June 2019 following review as the original Bronze winner, No. 42 Strakka Racing's Nick Leventis, was disqualified for doping violations.

== Championship standings ==
Scoring system

Championship points were awarded for the first ten positions in each race. Entries were required to complete 75% of the winning car's race distance in order to be classified and earn points, with the exception of Bathurst where a car simply had to cross the finish line to be classified. Individual drivers were required to participate for a minimum of 25 minutes in order to earn championship points in any race. A manufacturer only received points for its two highest placed cars in each round.

Position	**1st**	**2nd**	**3rd**	**4th**	**5th**	**6th**	**7th**	**8th**	**9th**	**10th**
Points	25	18	15	12	10	8	6	4	2	1

=== Drivers' championships ===
The results indicate the classification relative to other drivers in the series, not the classification in the race.

Pos.	Driver	Manufacturer	BAT (Australia)	SPA (Belgium)	SUZ (Japan)	LGA (United States)	Points
1	(France) Tristan Vautier	Mercedes-AMG	2	3	**1**	3	73
2	(Germany) Christopher Haase	Audi	Ret	1	3	**1**	65
3	(Italy) Raffaele Marciello	Mercedes-AMG	2	3	**1**	7	64
4	(Germany) Markus Winkelhock	Audi	Ret	1	3	2	58
4	(Germany) Maro Engel	Mercedes-AMG		2	**1**	3	58
5	(Belgium) Dries Vanthoor	Audi	1	13	4	2	55
5	(Netherlands) Robin Frijns	Audi	1	**4**		2	55
6	(South Africa) Kelvin van der Linde	Audi	**12**		3	**1**	40
7	(Belgium) Frédéric Vervisch	Audi	**12**	1	4		37
7	(Germany) Christopher Mies	Audi	Ret	13	4	**1**	37
7	(United Kingdom) Stuart Leonard	Audi	1	Ret	9	5	37
8	(Germany) Maximilian Götz	Mercedes-AMG	13	5	2	7	34
9	(Germany) Maximilian Buhk	Mercedes-AMG	13	5	7	3	31
10	(United Kingdom) Lewis Williamson	Mercedes-AMG	7	7^{2}	2	7	30
11	(Portugal) Álvaro Parente	Mercedes-AMG	13	5	2		28
11	(Portugal) Álvaro Parente	Bentley				11^{3}	28
12	(France) Romain Dumas (France) Frédéric Makowiecki (Germany) Dirk Werner	Porsche	6	11	12	4	22
13	(Australia) Kenny Habul	Mercedes-AMG	2	8^{2}	10^{2}	12	18
13	(Germany) Luca Stolz	Porsche	3^{1}				18
13	(Germany) Luca Stolz	Mercedes-AMG		2	10^{2}	11	18
13	(Australia) Jamie Whincup	Mercedes-AMG	2				18
13	(Netherlands) Yelmer Buurman	Mercedes-AMG		2			18
14	(Netherlands) Jeroen Bleekemolen (United States) Tim Pappas	Porsche	3	14	13	8	19
15	(Monaco) Vincent Abril (Spain) Andy Soucek (Belgium) Maxime Soulet	Bentley	Ret	Ret	6	6	16
16	(Germany) Marc Lieb	Porsche	3	14			15
16	(Spain) Daniel Juncadella	Mercedes-AMG		3			15
17	(United States) Patrick Long	Porsche	4			9	15
18	(United States) David Calvert-Jones (Australia) Matt Campbell (Australia) Alex Davison	Porsche	4				12
18	(Switzerland) Nico Müller (Germany) René Rast	Audi		**4**			12
18	(South Africa) Sheldon van der Linde	Audi			9	5	12
19	(Belgium) Laurens Vanthoor	Porsche	5	Ret	10		12
19	(France) Kévin Estre	Porsche	5		11		11
20	(Spain) Alex Riberas	Audi		13		5	10
20	(New Zealand) Earl Bamber	Porsche	5	Ret	Ret		10
20	(Japan) Tatsuya Kataoka (Japan) Kamui Kobayashi (Japan) Nobuteru Taniguchi	Mercedes-AMG			5		10
20	(France) Adrien Tambay	Mercedes-AMG			7	8	12
21	(Switzerland) Edoardo Mortara (United Kingdom) Gary Paffett (Netherlands) Renger van der Zande	Mercedes-AMG		6			8
22	(France) Côme Ledogar	McLaren	Ret	9	Ret		6
22	(United Kingdom) Ben Barnicoat	McLaren		9	Ret		6
22	(Italy) David Fumanelli (United Kingdom) Nick Leventis	Mercedes-AMG	7	7^{2}	Ret^{2}	DSQ	6
22	(Australia) Cameron Waters	Mercedes-AMG	7				6
22	(France) Olivier Pla	McLaren		9			6
22	(United Kingdom) Oliver Rowland	Mercedes-AMG			7		6
23	(France) Jules Gounon (United Kingdom) Steven Kane	Bentley	11	10	14	11	4
23	(South Africa) Jordan Pepper	Bentley		10	14	11	4
23	(United Kingdom) Andrew Watson	McLaren	8	15	Ret		4
23	(United Kingdom) Alexander West	McLaren	8	15			4
23	(New Zealand) Scott McLaughlin (Australia) Fraser Ross	McLaren	8				4
23	(United Kingdom) Richard Lyons (Belgium) Alessio Picariello (Japan) Ryuichiro Tomita	Audi			8		4
23	(United Kingdom) Jack Hawksworth (Germany) Christian Vietoris	Mercedes-AMG				8	6
24	(New Zealand) Craig Baird (Australia) Tony D'Alberto (Australia) Max Twigg	Mercedes-AMG	9				2
24	(United Kingdom) Jake Dennis	Audi			9		2
25	(Canada) Paul Dalla Lana (Australia) Will Davison (Portugal) Pedro Lamy (Austria) Mathias Lauda	Audi	10				1
25	(Germany) Edward Lewis Brauner (Germany) Jürgen Häring (Germany) Alfred Renauer (Germany) Wolfgang Triller	Porsche		12			1
25	(France) Mathieu Jaminet	Porsche			11		1
25	(Brazil) Rodrigo Baptista (United States) Bryan Sellers	Bentley				11	1
	(United Kingdom) Guy Smith	Bentley	11				0
	(United States) Marc Miller	Porsche		14	13		0
	(Australia) Garth Tander	Audi	**12**				0
	(United Kingdom) Chris Goodwin (United Kingdom) Chris Harris	McLaren		15			0
	(New Zealand) Shane van Gisbergen (Australia) Craig Lowndes	McLaren	Ret				
	(Germany) Timo Bernhard	Porsche		Ret			
	(United Kingdom) Andy Meyrick (United Kingdom) Seb Morris (United Kingdom) Derek Pierce (United Kingdom) Rob Smith	Bentley		Ret			
	(Switzerland) Marcel Fässler (Brazil) Daniel Serra	Audi		Ret			
	(Japan) Tomonobu Fujii (Germany) Sven Müller	Porsche			Ret		
Drivers ineligible to score points
	(United Kingdom) Chris Buncombe	Mercedes-AMG		7			
	(Brazil) Felipe Fraga	Mercedes-AMG			Ret	8	
	(Germany) Thomas Jäger (Austria) Martin Konrad (Germany) Bernd Schneider	Mercedes-AMG		8			
	(Canada) Mikaël Grenier	Mercedes-AMG			10	13	
Pos.	Driver	Manufacturer	BAT (Australia)	SPA (Belgium)	SUZ (Japan)	LGA (United States)	Points

Colour	Result
Gold	Winner
Silver	Second place
Bronze	Third place
Green	Points classification
Blue	Non-points classification
Blue	Non-classified finish (NC)
Purple	Retired, not classified (Ret)
Red	Did not qualify (DNQ)
Red	Did not pre-qualify (DNPQ)
Black	Disqualified (DSQ)
White	Did not start (DNS)
White	Withdrew (WD)
White	Race cancelled (C)
Blank	Did not practice (DNP)
Blank	Did not arrive (DNA)
Blank	Excluded (EX)

**Bold** – Pole
Italics – Fastest Lap

Notes

- ^{1} – Luca Stolz's result with Porsche did not count, because he scored more points with Mercedes-AMG.
- ^{2} – Ineligible to score points.
- ^{3} – Álvaro Parente's result with Bentley did not count, because he scored more points with Mercedes-AMG.
- ^{4} - Results finalised on 27 July 2019 following review of California 8 Hours.

==== Bronze Drivers ====
Pos.	Driver	Manufacturer	BAT (Australia)	SPA (Belgium)	SUZ (Japan)	LGA (United States)	Points
1	(Australia) Kenny Habul	Mercedes-AMG	2	8	10	13	83
2	(United States) Tim Pappas	Porsche	3	14	13	10	66
Pos.	Driver	Manufacturer	BAT (Australia)	SPA (Belgium)	SUZ (Japan)	LGA (United States)	Points

=== Manufacturers' championship ===
Only the top two cars for a manufacturer are eligible for points.

Pos.	Manufacturer	Car	BAT (Australia)	SPA (Belgium)	SUZ (Japan)	LGA (United States)	Points
1	Audi	R8 LMS	**1**	1	3	**1**	138
1	Audi	R8 LMS	10	**4**	4	2	138
2	Mercedes-AMG	AMG GT3	2	2	**1**	3	127
2	Mercedes-AMG	AMG GT3	7	3	2	7	127
3	Porsche	911 GT3 R	3	11	11	4	69
3	Porsche	911 GT3 R	4	12	12	10	69
4	Bentley	Continental GT3 (2016); Continental GT3 (2018)	11	10	6	5	40
4	Bentley	Continental GT3 (2016); Continental GT3 (2018)	Ret	Ret	14	11	40
5	McLaren	650S GT3	8	9	Ret		20
5	McLaren	650S GT3	Ret	15			20
Pos.	Manufacturer	Car	BAT (Australia)	SPA (Belgium)	SUZ (Japan)	LGA (United States)	Points

== See also ==
- Intercontinental GT Challenge
