= 2018 24 Hours of Spa =

Layout of the Circuit de Spa-Francorchamps

The 2018 Total Spa 24 Hours was the 71st running of the Spa 24 Hours endurance race. It was also the fourth round of the 2018 Blancpain GT Series Endurance Cup and was held on 28 and 29 July at the Circuit de Spa-Francorchamps, Belgium.

== Entry list ==
The following drivers will attend the 2018 24 Hours of Spa:

Icon	Class
P	Pro Cup
S	Silver Cup
PA	Pro-Am Cup
Am	Am Cup
N	Group N

Team	Car	N°	Drivers	Class
(Belgium) Audi Sport Team WRT	Audi R8 LMS	1	(Belgium) Dries Vanthoor	P
(Belgium) Audi Sport Team WRT	Audi R8 LMS	1	(Spain) Alex Riberas	P
(Belgium) Audi Sport Team WRT	Audi R8 LMS	1	(Germany) Christopher Mies	P
(Belgium) Audi Sport Team WRT	Audi R8 LMS	2	(Germany) René Rast	P
(Belgium) Audi Sport Team WRT	Audi R8 LMS	2	(Switzerland) Nico Müller	P
(Belgium) Audi Sport Team WRT	Audi R8 LMS	2	(Netherlands) Robin Frijns	P
(Germany) Black Falcon	Mercedes-AMG GT3	4	(Netherlands) Yelmer Buurman	P
(Germany) Black Falcon	Mercedes-AMG GT3	4	(Germany) Luca Stolz	P
(Germany) Black Falcon	Mercedes-AMG GT3	4	(Germany) Maro Engel	P
(Germany) Black Falcon	Mercedes-AMG GT3	5	(Saudi Arabia) Saud Al Faisal	PA
(Germany) Black Falcon	Mercedes-AMG GT3	5	(Greece) Kriton Lendoudis	PA
(Germany) Black Falcon	Mercedes-AMG GT3	5	(Portugal) Rui Aguas	PA
(Germany) Black Falcon	Mercedes-AMG GT3	5	(United Kingdom) Tom Onslow-Cole	PA
(Germany) Black Falcon	Mercedes-AMG GT3	6	(Saudi Arabia) Abdulaziz Al Faisal	S
(Germany) Black Falcon	Mercedes-AMG GT3	6	(Germany) Hubert Haupt	S
(Germany) Black Falcon	Mercedes-AMG GT3	6	(Germany) Manuel Metzger	S
(Germany) Black Falcon	Mercedes-AMG GT3	6	(Italy) Gabriele Piana	S
(United Kingdom) Bentley Team M-Sport	Bentley Continental GT3	7	(South Africa) Jordan Pepper	P
(United Kingdom) Bentley Team M-Sport	Bentley Continental GT3	7	(United Kingdom) Steven Kane	P
(United Kingdom) Bentley Team M-Sport	Bentley Continental GT3	7	(France) Jules Gounon	P
(United Kingdom) Bentley Team M-Sport	Bentley Continental GT3	8	(Monaco) Vincent Abril	P
(United Kingdom) Bentley Team M-Sport	Bentley Continental GT3	8	(Spain) Andy Soucek	P
(United Kingdom) Bentley Team M-Sport	Bentley Continental GT3	8	(Belgium) Maxine Soulet	P
(Italy) Target Racing	Lamborghini Huracán GT3	9	(Italy) Alberto di Folco	Am
(Italy) Target Racing	Lamborghini Huracán GT3	9	(Italy) Stefano Costantini	Am
(Italy) Target Racing	Lamborghini Huracán GT3	9	(Belgium) Bernard Delhez	Am
(Italy) Target Racing	Lamborghini Huracán GT3	9	(France) Sylvain Debs	Am
(Italy) Ombra Racing	Lamborghini Huracán GT3	12	(China) Kang Ling	S
(Italy) Ombra Racing	Lamborghini Huracán GT3	12	(Italy) Alex Frassinetti	S
(Italy) Ombra Racing	Lamborghini Huracán GT3	12	(France) Romain Monti	S
(Italy) Ombra Racing	Lamborghini Huracán GT3	12	(Italy) Andrea Rizzoli	S
(Switzerland) Emil Frey Lexus Racing	Lexus RC F GT3	14	(Germany) Marco Seefried	P
(Switzerland) Emil Frey Lexus Racing	Lexus RC F GT3	14	(Austria) Christian Klien	P
(Switzerland) Emil Frey Lexus Racing	Lexus RC F GT3	14	(Spain) Albert Costa	P
(Belgium) Belgian Audi Club Team WRT	Audi R8 LMS	17	(Brazil) Daniel Serra	P
(Belgium) Belgian Audi Club Team WRT	Audi R8 LMS	17	(United Kingdom) Stuart Leonard	P
(Belgium) Belgian Audi Club Team WRT	Audi R8 LMS	17	(Switzerland) Marcel Fässler	P
(Italy) Antonelli Motorsport	Lamborghini Huracán GT3	18	(United States) Juan Perez	PA
(Italy) Antonelli Motorsport	Lamborghini Huracán GT3	18	(Italy) Gianluca Giraudi	PA
(Italy) Antonelli Motorsport	Lamborghini Huracán GT3	18	(Italy) Loris Spinelli	PA
(Italy) Antonelli Motorsport	Lamborghini Huracán GT3	18	(Italy) Giacomo Altoè	PA
(Austria) GRT Grasser Racing Team	Lamborghini Huracán GT3	19	(Argentina) Ezequiel Perez Companc	P
(Austria) GRT Grasser Racing Team	Lamborghini Huracán GT3	19	(Italy) Raffaelle Giammaria	P
(Austria) GRT Grasser Racing Team	Lamborghini Huracán GT3	19	(Italy) Marco Mapelli	P
(Austria) GRT Grasser Racing Team	Lamborghini Huracán GT3	63	(Italy) Andrea Cadarelli	P
(Austria) GRT Grasser Racing Team	Lamborghini Huracán GT3	63	(Germany) Christian Engelhart	P
(Austria) GRT Grasser Racing Team	Lamborghini Huracán GT3	63	(Italy) Mirko Bortolotti	P
(Austria) GRT Grasser Racing Team	Lamborghini Huracán GT3	82	(Switzerland) Rolf Ineichen	P
(Austria) GRT Grasser Racing Team	Lamborghini Huracán GT3	82	(United Kingdom) Phil Keen	P
(Austria) GRT Grasser Racing Team	Lamborghini Huracán GT3	82	(France) Franck Perera	P
(United Kingdom) GT SPORT-MOTUL Team RJN	Nissan GT-R Nismo GT3	22	(United Kingdom) Sean Walkinshaw	S
(United Kingdom) GT SPORT-MOTUL Team RJN	Nissan GT-R Nismo GT3	22	(United Kingdom) Jordan Witt	S
(United Kingdom) GT SPORT-MOTUL Team RJN	Nissan GT-R Nismo GT3	22	(Mexico) Ricardo Sanchez	S
(United Kingdom) GT SPORT-MOTUL Team RJN	Nissan GT-R Nismo GT3	22	(United Kingdom) Struan Moore	S
(United Kingdom) GT SPORT-MOTUL Team RJN	Nissan GT-R Nismo GT3	23	(United Kingdom) Matt Parry	P
(United Kingdom) GT SPORT-MOTUL Team RJN	Nissan GT-R Nismo GT3	23	(United Kingdom) Alex Buncombe	P
(United Kingdom) GT SPORT-MOTUL Team RJN	Nissan GT-R Nismo GT3	23	(Spain) Lucas Ordoñez	P
(France) Audi Sport Team Sainteloc	Audi R8 LMS	25	(Germany) Markus Winkelhock	P
(France) Audi Sport Team Sainteloc	Audi R8 LMS	25	(Belgium) Frederic Vervisch	P
(France) Audi Sport Team Sainteloc	Audi R8 LMS	25	(Germany) Christopher Haase	P
(France) Sainteloc Racing	Audi R8 LMS	26	(Belgium) Christian Kelders	Am
(France) Sainteloc Racing	Audi R8 LMS	26	(France) Nyls Stievenart	Am
(France) Sainteloc Racing	Audi R8 LMS	26	(France) Marc Rostan	Am
(France) Sainteloc Racing	Audi R8 LMS	26	(France) Simon Gachet	Am
(Italy) Daiko Lazarus Racing	Lamborghini Huracán GT3	28	(France) Arno Santamato	S
(Italy) Daiko Lazarus Racing	Lamborghini Huracán GT3	28	(Italy) Stefano Gattuso	S
(Italy) Daiko Lazarus Racing	Lamborghini Huracán GT3	28	(Germany) Nicolas Pohler	S
(Italy) Daiko Lazarus Racing	Lamborghini Huracán GT3	28	(Italy) Fabrizio Crestani	S
(Germany) Montaplast by Land-Motorsport	Audi R8 LMS	29	(South Africa) Kelvin van der Linde	P
(Germany) Montaplast by Land-Motorsport	Audi R8 LMS	29	(South Africa) Sheldon van der Linde	P
(Germany) Montaplast by Land-Motorsport	Audi R8 LMS	29	(Switzerland) Jeffrey Schmidt	P
(Italy) Castrol Honda Racing	Acura Honda NSX GT3	30	(Italy) Riccardo Patrese	PA
(Italy) Castrol Honda Racing	Acura Honda NSX GT3	30	(France) Loic Depailler	PA
(Italy) Castrol Honda Racing	Acura Honda NSX GT3	30	(Argentina) Esteban Guerrieri	PA
(Italy) Castrol Honda Racing	Acura Honda NSX GT3	30	(Belgium) Bertrand Baguette	PA
(United Kingdom) Team Parker Racing	Bentley Continental GT3	31	(United Kingdom) Rob Smith	PA
(United Kingdom) Team Parker Racing	Bentley Continental GT3	31	(United Kingdom) Derek Pierce	PA
(United Kingdom) Team Parker Racing	Bentley Continental GT3	31	(United Kingdom) Andy Meyrick	PA
(United Kingdom) Team Parker Racing	Bentley Continental GT3	31	(United Kingdom) Seb Morris	PA
(Germany) Wakenhorst Motorsport	BMW M6 GT3	34	(United Kingdom) Tom Blomqvist	P
(Germany) Wakenhorst Motorsport	BMW M6 GT3	34	(Norway) Christian Krognes	P
(Germany) Wakenhorst Motorsport	BMW M6 GT3	34	(Austria) Philipp Eng	P
(Germany) Wakenhorst Motorsport	BMW M6 GT3	36	(Norway) Anders Buchardt	Am
(Germany) Wakenhorst Motorsport	BMW M6 GT3	36	(Germany) Henry Walkenhorst	Am
(Germany) Wakenhorst Motorsport	BMW M6 GT3	36	(Germany) Ralf Oeverhaus	Am
(Germany) Wakenhorst Motorsport	BMW M6 GT3	36	(Germany) Immanuel Vinke	Am
(Russia) SMP Racing by AKKA ASP	Mercedes-AMG GT3	35	(United Kingdom) Michael Meadows	P
(Russia) SMP Racing by AKKA ASP	Mercedes-AMG GT3	35	(Russia) Denis Bulatov	P
(Russia) SMP Racing by AKKA ASP	Mercedes-AMG GT3	35	(Russia) Vitaly Petrov	P
(United Kingdom) Strakka Racing	Mercedes-AMG GT3	42	(United Kingdom) Chris Buncombe	PA
(United Kingdom) Strakka Racing	Mercedes-AMG GT3	42	(United Kingdom) Nick Leventis	PA
(United Kingdom) Strakka Racing	Mercedes-AMG GT3	42	(United Kingdom) Lewis Williamson	PA
(United Kingdom) Strakka Racing	Mercedes-AMG GT3	42	(Italy) David Fumanelli	PA
(United Kingdom) Strakka Racing	Mercedes-AMG GT3	43	(Germany) Maxi Buhk	P
(United Kingdom) Strakka Racing	Mercedes-AMG GT3	43	(Portugal) Alvaro Parente	P
(United Kingdom) Strakka Racing	Mercedes-AMG GT3	43	(Germany) Maxi Götz	P
(United Kingdom) Strakka Racing	Mercedes-AMG GT3	44	(Brazil) Rubens Barrichello	P
(United Kingdom) Strakka Racing	Mercedes-AMG GT3	44	(Germany) Christian Vietoris	P
(United Kingdom) Strakka Racing	Mercedes-AMG GT3	44	(Brazil) Felipe Fraga	P
(United Kingdom) Ram Racing	Mercedes-AMG GT3	49	(United Kingdom) Darren Burke	PA
(United Kingdom) Ram Racing	Mercedes-AMG GT3	49	(Turkey) Salih Yoluc	PA
(United Kingdom) Ram Racing	Mercedes-AMG GT3	49	(United Kingdom) Euan Hankey	PA
(United Kingdom) Ram Racing	Mercedes-AMG GT3	49	(Sweden) Felix Rosenqvist	PA
(Italy) AF Corse	Ferrari 488 GT3	51	(United Kingdom) Duncan Cameron	PA
(Italy) AF Corse	Ferrari 488 GT3	51	(Italy) Lorenzo Bontempelli	PA
(Italy) AF Corse	Ferrari 488 GT3	51	(United Kingdom) Aaron Scott	PA
(Italy) AF Corse	Ferrari 488 GT3	51	(Republic of Ireland) Matt Griffin	PA
(Italy) AF Corse	Ferrari 488 GT3	53	(Netherlands) Niek Hommerson	PA
(Italy) AF Corse	Ferrari 488 GT3	53	(Belgium) Lous Machiels	PA
(Italy) AF Corse	Ferrari 488 GT3	53	(Italy) Marco Cioci	PA
(Italy) AF Corse	Ferrari 488 GT3	53	(Italy) Andrea Bertolini	PA
(Switzerland) Emil Frey Jaguar Racing	Emil Frey GT3 Jaguar	54	(Switzerland) Alex Fontana	S
(Switzerland) Emil Frey Jaguar Racing	Emil Frey GT3 Jaguar	54	(Switzerland) Adrian Zaugg	S
(Switzerland) Emil Frey Jaguar Racing	Emil Frey GT3 Jaguar	54	(Canada) Mikael Grenier	S
(Germany) Attempto Racing	Audi R8 LMS	55	(Germany) Kim-Luis Schramm	P
(Germany) Attempto Racing	Audi R8 LMS	55	(Austria) Clemens Schmid	P
(Germany) Attempto Racing	Audi R8 LMS	55	(Germany) Pierre Kaffer	P
(Germany) Attempto Racing	Audi R8 LMS	66	(Netherlands) Pieter Schothorst	P
(Germany) Attempto Racing	Audi R8 LMS	66	(Netherlands) Steijn Schothorst	P
(Germany) Attempto Racing	Audi R8 LMS	66	(United Kingdom) Jamie Green	P
(United Kingdom) Garage 59	McLaren 650S GT3	58	(France) Côme Ledogar	P
(United Kingdom) Garage 59	McLaren 650S GT3	58	(France) Olivier Pla	P
(United Kingdom) Garage 59	McLaren 650S GT3	58	(United Kingdom) Ben Barnicoat	P
(United Kingdom) Garage 59	McLaren 650S GT3	188	(Sweden) Alexander West	Am
(United Kingdom) Garage 59	McLaren 650S GT3	188	(United Kingdom) Chris Harris	Am
(United Kingdom) Garage 59	McLaren 650S GT3	188	(United Kingdom) Chris Goodwin	Am
(United Kingdom) Garage 59	McLaren 650S GT3	188	(United Kingdom) Andrew Watson	Am
(Switzerland) R-Motorsport	Aston Martin V12 Vantage	62	(Austria) Dominik Baumann	P
(Switzerland) R-Motorsport	Aston Martin V12 Vantage	62	(Germany) Marvin Kirchhöfer	P
(Switzerland) R-Motorsport	Aston Martin V12 Vantage	62	(Belgium) Maxime Martin	P
(Switzerland) R-Motorsport	Aston Martin V12 Vantage	76	(France) Matthieu Vaxiviere	P
(Switzerland) R-Motorsport	Aston Martin V12 Vantage	76	(United Kingdom) Jake Dennis	P
(Switzerland) R-Motorsport	Aston Martin V12 Vantage	76	(Denmark) Nicki Thiim	P
(Italy) GDL Racing	Lamborghini Super Trofeo	67	(Indonesia) Andrew Haryanto	N
(Italy) GDL Racing	Lamborghini Super Trofeo	67	(Argentina) Andres Josephsohn	N
(Italy) GDL Racing	Lamborghini Super Trofeo	67	(Italy) Beniamino Caccia	N
(Italy) GDL Racing	Lamborghini Super Trofeo	67	(Belgium) Sarah Bovy	N
(Belgium) Speed Lover	Porsche 991 Cup	70	(Belgium) Pierre-Yves Paque	N
(Belgium) Speed Lover	Porsche 991 Cup	70	(Belgium) Gregory Paisse	N
(Belgium) Speed Lover	Porsche 991 Cup	70	(Luxembourg) Bob Wilwert	N
(Belgium) Speed Lover	Porsche 991 Cup	70	(France) Gilles Petit	N
(Russia) SMP Racing	Ferrari 488 GT3	72	(Russia) Mikhail Aleshin	P
(Russia) SMP Racing	Ferrari 488 GT3	72	(Spain) Miguel Molina	P
(Russia) SMP Racing	Ferrari 488 GT3	72	(Italy) Davide Rigon	P
(Singapore) T2 Motorsport	Ferrari 488 GT3	75	(Singapore) Gregory Teo	Am
(Singapore) T2 Motorsport	Ferrari 488 GT3	75	(Indonesia) David Tjiptobiantoro	Am
(Singapore) T2 Motorsport	Ferrari 488 GT3	75	(Italy) Matteo Cressoni	Am
(United Kingdom) Barwell Motorsport	Lamborghini Huracán GT3	77	(Switzerland) Adrian Amstutz	Am
(United Kingdom) Barwell Motorsport	Lamborghini Huracán GT3	77	(Russia) Leo Machitski	Am
(United Kingdom) Barwell Motorsport	Lamborghini Huracán GT3	77	(Finland) Patrick Kujala	Am
(United Kingdom) Barwell Motorsport	Lamborghini Huracán GT3	78	(Italy) Michele Beretta	S
(United Kingdom) Barwell Motorsport	Lamborghini Huracán GT3	78	(Netherlands) Rik Breukers	S
(United Kingdom) Barwell Motorsport	Lamborghini Huracán GT3	78	(United Kingdom) Sandy Mitchell	S
(United Kingdom) Barwell Motorsport	Lamborghini Huracán GT3	78	(Croatia) Martin Kodric	S
(Germany) Mercedes-AMG Team MANN-FILTER	Mercedes-AMG GT3	84	(Netherlands) Renger van der Zande	P
(Germany) Mercedes-AMG Team MANN-FILTER	Mercedes-AMG GT3	84	(Switzerland) Edoardo Mortara	P
(Germany) Mercedes-AMG Team MANN-FILTER	Mercedes-AMG GT3	84	(United Kingdom) Gary Paffett	P
(France) AKKA ASP Team	Mercedes-AMG GT3	88	(Italy) Raffaele Marciello	P
(France) AKKA ASP Team	Mercedes-AMG GT3	88	(Spain) Daniel Juncadella	P
(France) AKKA ASP Team	Mercedes-AMG GT3	88	(France) Tristan Vautier	P
(France) AKKA ASP Team	Mercedes-AMG GT3	89	(France) Nico Jamin	Am
(France) AKKA ASP Team	Mercedes-AMG GT3	89	(Switzerland) Philippe Giauque	Am
(France) AKKA ASP Team	Mercedes-AMG GT3	89	(France) Eric Debard	Am
(France) AKKA ASP Team	Mercedes-AMG GT3	89	(France) Fabien Barthez	Am
(France) AKKA ASP Team	Mercedes-AMG GT3	90	(United Kingdom) Jack Manchester	S
(France) AKKA ASP Team	Mercedes-AMG GT3	90	(Netherlands) Jules Szymkowiak	S
(France) AKKA ASP Team	Mercedes-AMG GT3	90	(Germany) Fabian Schiller	S
(France) AKKA ASP Team	Mercedes-AMG GT3	90	(Germany) Nico Bastian	S
Oman Racing with TF Sport	Aston Martin V12 Vantage	97	(Oman) Ahmad Al Harthy	S
Oman Racing with TF Sport	Aston Martin V12 Vantage	97	(United Kingdom) Euan Mckay	S
Oman Racing with TF Sport	Aston Martin V12 Vantage	97	(United Kingdom) Charlie Eastwood	S
Oman Racing with TF Sport	Aston Martin V12 Vantage	97	(United Kingdom) Ross Gunn	S
(Germany) ROWE Racing	BMW M6 GT3	98	(United Kingdom) Ricky Collard	P
(Germany) ROWE Racing	BMW M6 GT3	98	(Germany) Marco Wittmann	P
(Germany) ROWE Racing	BMW M6 GT3	98	(Finland) Jesse Krohn	P
(Germany) ROWE Racing	BMW M6 GT3	99	(United Kingdom) Alexander Sims	P
(Germany) ROWE Racing	BMW M6 GT3	99	(Germany) Jens Klingmann	P
(Germany) ROWE Racing	BMW M6 GT3	99	(Netherlands) Nicky Catsburg	P
(Belgium) Brussels Racing	Aston Martin V12 Vantage	100	(Belgium) Nicolas Van Dierendonck	PA
(Belgium) Brussels Racing	Aston Martin V12 Vantage	100	(Belgium) Koen Wauters	PA
(Belgium) Brussels Racing	Aston Martin V12 Vantage	100	(Belgium) Tim Verbergt	PA
(Belgium) Brussels Racing	Aston Martin V12 Vantage	100	(Belgium) Sam Dejonghe	PA
(Germany) Aust Motorsport	Audi R8 LMS	111	(Switzerland) Nikolaj Rogivue	S
(Germany) Aust Motorsport	Audi R8 LMS	111	(Netherlands) Loris Hezemans	S
(Germany) Aust Motorsport	Audi R8 LMS	111	(Switzerland) Philipp Frommenwiler	S
(Germany) Aust Motorsport	Audi R8 LMS	111	(Germany) Tobias Dauenhauer	S
(Switzerland) Emil Frey Lexus Racing	Lexus RC F GT3	114	(Austria) Norbert Siedler	P
(Switzerland) Emil Frey Lexus Racing	Lexus RC F GT3	114	(Monaco) Stephane Ortelli	P
(Switzerland) Emil Frey Lexus Racing	Lexus RC F GT3	114	(Finland) Markus Palttala	P
(Germany) KÜS Team75 Bernhard	Porsche 911 GT3 R	117	(New Zealand) Earl Bamber	P
(Germany) KÜS Team75 Bernhard	Porsche 911 GT3 R	117	(Germany) Timo Bernhard	P
(Germany) KÜS Team75 Bernhard	Porsche 911 GT3 R	117	(Belgium) Laurens Vanthoor	P
(Germany) Sun Energy 1 Team HTP Motorsport	Mercedes-AMG GT3	175	(Australia) Kenny Habul	PA
(Germany) Sun Energy 1 Team HTP Motorsport	Mercedes-AMG GT3	175	(Germany) Bernd Schneider	PA
(Germany) Sun Energy 1 Team HTP Motorsport	Mercedes-AMG GT3	175	(Germany) Thomas Jäger	PA
(Germany) Sun Energy 1 Team HTP Motorsport	Mercedes-AMG GT3	175	(Austria) Martin Konrad	PA
(Germany) Rinaldi Racing	Ferrari 488 GT3	333	(Germany) Daniel Keilwitz	PA
(Germany) Rinaldi Racing	Ferrari 488 GT3	333	(Germany) Alexander Mattschull	PA
(Germany) Rinaldi Racing	Ferrari 488 GT3	333	(Russia) Rinat Salikhov	PA
(Germany) Rinaldi Racing	Ferrari 488 GT3	333	(South Africa) David Perel	PA
(Germany) Rinaldi Racing	Ferrari 488 GT3	488	(Germany) Murod Sultanov	Am
(Germany) Rinaldi Racing	Ferrari 488 GT3	488	(South Korea) Rick Yoon	Am
(Germany) Rinaldi Racing	Ferrari 488 GT3	488	(United States) Nicholas Boulle	Am
(Germany) Rinaldi Racing	Ferrari 488 GT3	488	(Germany) Pierre Ehret	Am
(United States) Black Swan Racing	Porsche 911 GT3 R	540	(United States) Tim Pappas	PA
(United States) Black Swan Racing	Porsche 911 GT3 R	540	(Netherlands) Jeroen Bleekemolen	PA
(United States) Black Swan Racing	Porsche 911 GT3 R	540	(United States) Marc Miller	PA
(United States) Black Swan Racing	Porsche 911 GT3 R	540	(Germany) Marc Lieb	PA
(Germany) Attempto Racing	Lamborghini Huracán GT3	666	(Austria) Sven Heyrowsky	Am
(Germany) Attempto Racing	Lamborghini Huracán GT3	666	(Switzerland) Jürgen Krebs	Am
(Germany) Attempto Racing	Lamborghini Huracán GT3	666	(Switzerland) Tim Müller	Am
(Germany) Attempto Racing	Lamborghini Huracán GT3	666	(Germany) John Louis Jasper	Am
(Germany) Manthey Racing	Porsche 911 GT3 R	911	(France) Frédéric Makowiecki	P
(Germany) Manthey Racing	Porsche 911 GT3 R	911	(France) Romain Dumas	P
(Germany) Manthey Racing	Porsche 911 GT3 R	911	(Germany) Dirk Werner	P
(Germany) Herberth Motorsport	Porsche 911 GT3 R	991	(Germany) Jürgen Häring	Am
(Germany) Herberth Motorsport	Porsche 911 GT3 R	991	(Germany) Edward Lewis	Am
(Germany) Herberth Motorsport	Porsche 911 GT3 R	991	(Germany) Wolfgang Triller	Am
(Germany) Herberth Motorsport	Porsche 911 GT3 R	991	(Germany) Alfred Renauer	Am

== Qualifying ==
These were the 10 fastest cars in qualifying

Pos	N°	Driver	Team	Car	Time	Dif
1	1	Dries Vanthoor	Audi Sport Team WRT	Audi R8 LMS	2:18,578	
2	62	Maxime Martin	R-Motorsport	Aston Martin V12 Vantage	2:19.183	+0,605
3	2	Nico Müller	Audi Sport Team WRT	Audi R8 LMS	2:19.366	+0,788
4	72	Davide Rigon	SMP Racing	Ferrari 488 GT3	2:19.433	+0,855
5	29	Kevin van der Linde	Montaplast by Land-Motorsport	Audi R8 LMS	2:19.493	+0,915
6	58	Côme Ledogar	Garage 59	McLaren 650S GT3	2:19.512	+0,934
7	25	Markus Winkelhock	Audi Sport Team Saintéloc	Audi R8 LMS	2:19.515	+0,937
8	34	Philipp Eng	Wakenhorst Motorsport	BMW M6 GT3	2:19.517	+0,939
9	911	Frédéric Makowiecki	Manthey Racing	Porsche 911 GT3	2:19.649	+1,071
10	63	Mirko Bortolotti	GRT Grasser Racing Team	Lamborghini Huracán GT3	2:19.697	+1,119

== Race ==
=== Race result ===
Pos	Class	No	Team	Drivers	Car	Laps
1	Pro	34	(Germany) Walkenhorst Motorsport	(United Kingdom) Tom Blomqvist (Austria) Philipp Eng (Norway) Christian Krognes	BMW M6 GT3	511
2	Pro	99	(Germany) Rowe Racing	(Netherlands) Nick Catsburg (Germany) Jens Klingmann (United Kingdom) Alexander Sims	BMW M6 GT3	511
3	Pro	29	(Germany) Montaplast by Land-Motorsport	(South Africa) Kelvin van der Linde (South Africa) Sheldon van der Linde (Switzerland) Jeffrey Schmidt	Audi R8 LMS	511
4	Pro	25	(France) Audi Sport Team Saintéloc	(Germany) Christopher Haase (Belgium) Frédéric Vervisch (Germany) Markus Winkelhock	Audi R8 LMS	511
5	Pro	4	(Germany) Mercedes-AMG Team Black Falcon	(Netherlands) Yelmer Buurman (Germany) Maro Engel (Germany) Luca Stolz	Mercedes-AMG GT3	511
6	Pro	88	(France) Mercedes-AMG Team AKKA ASP	(Spain) Daniel Juncadella (Italy) Raffaele Marciello (France) Tristan Vautier	Mercedes-AMG GT3	510
7	Pro	23	(United Kingdom) GT SPORT MOTUL Team RJN	(United Kingdom) Alex Buncombe (Spain) Lucas Ordóñez (United Kingdom) Matt Parry	Nissan GT-R Nismo GT3 (2018)	510
8	Pro	2	(Belgium) Audi Sport Team WRT	(Netherlands) Robin Frijns (Switzerland) Nico Müller (Germany) René Rast	Audi R8 LMS	509
9	Pro	76	(Switzerland) R-Motorsport	(United Kingdom) Jake Dennis (Denmark) Nicki Thiim (France) Matthieu Vaxiviere	Aston Martin V12 Vantage GT3	508
10	Pro	72	(Russia) SMP Racing	(Italy) Davide Rigon (Spain) Miguel Molina (Russia) Mikhail Aleshin	Ferrari 488 GT3	508
11	Pro	43	(United Kingdom) Mercedes-AMG Team Strakka Racing	(Germany) Maximilian Buhk (Germany) Maximilian Götz (Portugal) Álvaro Parente	Mercedes-AMG GT3	508
12	Pro	84	(Germany) Mercedes-AMG Team MANN-FILTER	(Switzerland) Edoardo Mortara (United Kingdom) Gary Paffett (Netherlands) Renger van der Zande	Mercedes-AMG GT3	507
13	Pro	14	(Switzerland) Emil Frey Lexus Racing	(Spain) Albert Costa (Austria) Christian Klien (Germany) Marco Seefried	Lexus RC F GT3	507
14	Pro	19	(Austria) GRT Grasser Racing Team	(Italy) Raffaele Giammaria (Argentina) Ezequiel Pérez Companc (Italy) Marco Mapelli	Lamborghini Huracán GT3	506
15	Pro-Am	333	(Germany) Rinaldi Racing	(Germany) Daniel Keilwitz (Germany) Alexander Mattschull (Russia) Rinat Salikhov (South Africa) David Perel	Ferrari 488 GT3	506
16	Pro	35	(Russia) SMP Racing by AKKA ASP	(Russia) Denis Bulatov (United Kingdom) Michael Meadows (Russia) Vitaly Petrov	Mercedes-AMG GT3	505
17	Pro-Am	42	(United Kingdom) Strakka Racing	(United Kingdom) Chris Buncombe (Italy) David Fumanelli (United Kingdom) Nick Leventis (United Kingdom) Lewis Williamson	Mercedes-AMG GT3	504
18	Silver	12	(Italy) Ombra Racing	(Italy) Alex Frassineti (China) Kang Ling (France) Romain Monti (Italy) Andrea Rizzoli	Lamborghini Huracán GT3	504
19	Silver	78	(United Kingdom) Barwell Motorsport	(Italy) Michele Beretta (Netherlands) Rik Breukers (Croatia) Martin Kodrić (United Kingdom) Sandy Mitchell	Lamborghini Huracán GT3	504
20	Pro-Am	175	(Germany) SunEnergy 1 Team HTP Motorsport	(Australia) Kenny Habul (Germany) Thomas Jäger (Austria) Martin Konrad (Germany) Bernd Schneider	Mercedes-AMG GT3	503
21	Pro-Am	51	(Italy) AF Corse	(Italy) Lorenzo Bontempelli (United Kingdom) Duncan Cameron (Republic of Ireland) Matt Griffin (United Kingdom) Aaron Scott	Ferrari 488 GT3	503
22	Pro	58	(United Kingdom) Garage 59	(United Kingdom) Ben Barnicoat (France) Côme Ledogar (France) Olivier Pla	McLaren 650S GT3	503
23	Silver	6	(Germany) Black Falcon	(Saudi Arabia) Abdulaziz Al Faisal (Germany) Hubert Haupt (Germany) Manuel Metzger (Italy) Gabriele Piana	Mercedes-AMG GT3	501
24	Pro	55	(Germany) Attempto Racing	(Germany) Pierre Kaffer (Austria) Clemens Schmid (Germany) Kim-Luis Schramm	Audi R8 LMS	501
25	Pro	7	(United Kingdom) Bentley Team M-Sport	(France) Jules Gounon (United Kingdom) Steven Kane (South Africa) Jordan Pepper	Bentley Continental GT3 (2018)	499
26	Pro-Am	53	(Italy) AF Corse	(Italy) Andrea Bertolini (Italy) Marco Cioci (Netherlands) Niek Hommerson (Belgium) Louis Machiels	Ferrari 488 GT3	499
27	Am	77	(United Kingdom) Barwell Motorsport	(United Kingdom) Richard Abra (Switzerland) Adrian Amstutz (Finland) Patrick Kujala (Russia) Leo Machitski	Lamborghini Huracán GT3	496
28	Silver	54	(Switzerland) Emil Frey Jaguar Racing	(Switzerland) Alex Fontana (Canada) Mikaël Grenier (Switzerland) Adrian Zaugg	Emil Frey GT3 Jaguar	496
29	Pro	911	(Germany) Manthey Racing	(France) Romain Dumas (France) Frédéric Makowiecki (Germany) Dirk Werner	Porsche 911 GT3 R	493
30	Am	9	(Italy) Target Racing	(Italy) Stefano Costantini (France) Sylvain Debs (Belgium) Bernard Delhez (Italy) Alberto Di Folco	Lamborghini Huracán GT3	491
31	Pro-Am	5	(Germany) Black Falcon	(Portugal) Rui Águas (Saudi Arabia) Saud Al Faisal (Greece) Kriton Lendoudis (United Kingdom) Tom Onslow-Cole	Mercedes-AMG GT3	490
32	Pro-Am	30	(Italy) Castrol Honda Racing	(Belgium) Bertrand Baguette (France) Loïc Depailler (Argentina) Esteban Guerrieri (Italy) Riccardo Patrese	Honda NSX GT3	490
33	Pro-Am	49	(United Kingdom) Ram Racing	(United Kingdom) Euan Hankey (Turkey) Salih Yoluç (United Kingdom) Darren Burke (Sweden) Felix Rosenqvist	Mercedes-AMG GT3	489
34	Am	488	(Germany) Rinaldi Racing	(United States) Nicholas Boulle (Germany) Pierre Ehret (Germany) Murad Sultanov (South Korea) Rick Yoon	Ferrari 488 GT3	488
35	Pro	62	(Switzerland) R-Motorsport	(Austria) Dominik Baumann (Germany) Marvin Kirchhöfer (Belgium) Maxime Martin	Aston Martin V12 Vantage GT3	485
36	Am	75	(Singapore) T2 Motorsport	(Italy) Christian Colombo (Italy) Matteo Cressoni (Singapore) Gregory Teo (Indonesia) David Tjiptobiantoro	Ferrari 488 GT3	482
37	Silver	22	(United Kingdom) GT SPORT MOTUL Team RJN	(United Kingdom) Struan Moore (Mexico) Ricardo Sánchez (United Kingdom) Sean Walkinshaw (United Kingdom) Jordan Witt	Nissan GT-R Nismo GT3 (2017)	482
38	Am	36	(Germany) Walkenhorst Motorsport	(Norway) Anders Buchardt (Germany) Ralf Oeverhaus (Germany) Immanuel Vinke (Germany) Henry Walkenhorst	BMW M6 GT3	478
39	Am	991	(Germany) Herberth Motorsport	(Germany) Edward Lewis Brauner (Germany) Jürgen Häring (Germany) Wolfgang Triller (Germany) Alfred Renauer	Porsche 911 GT3 R	475
40	Pro	1	(Belgium) Audi Sport Team WRT	(Germany) Christopher Mies (Spain) Alex Riberas (Belgium) Dries Vanthoor	Audi R8 LMS	456
41	Pro-Am	540	(United States) Black Swan Racing	(Netherlands) Jeroen Bleekemolen (Germany) Marc Lieb (United States) Marc Miller (United States) Tim Pappas	Porsche 911 GT3 R	447
42	Am	188	(United Kingdom) Garage 59	(United Kingdom) Chris Goodwin (United Kingdom) Chris Harris (United Kingdom) Andrew Watson (Sweden) Alexander West	McLaren 650S GT3	391
43	Group Nat.	70	(Belgium) SpeedLover	(Belgium) Grégory Paisse (Belgium) Pierre-Yves Paque (France) Gilles Petit (Luxembourg) Bob Wilwert	Porsche 911 GT3 Cup	390
44	Pro	66	(Germany) Attempto Racing	(United Kingdom) Jamie Green (Netherlands) Pieter Schothorst (Netherlands) Steijn Schothorst	Audi R8 LMS	384
45	Pro-Am	100	(Belgium) Brussels Racing	(Belgium) Sam Dejonghe (Belgium) Nicolas Vandierendonck (Belgium) Tim Verbergt (Belgium) Koen Wauters	Aston Martin V12 Vantage GT3	376
46	Pro-Am	18	(Italy) Antonelli Motorsport	(Italy) Giacomo Altoè (Italy) Gianluca Giraudi (United States) Juan Perez (Italy) Loris Spinelli	Lamborghini Huracán GT3	374
47	Group Nat.	67	(Italy) GDL Racing	(Belgium) Sarah Bovy (Italy) Beniamino Caccia (Indonesia) Andrew Haryanto (Argentina) Andrés Josephsohn	Lamborghini Huracán LP 620-2 Super Trofeo	364
DNF	Pro	117	(Germany) KÜS Team75 Bernhard	(New Zealand) Earl Bamber (Germany) Timo Bernhard (Belgium) Laurens Vanthoor	Porsche 911 GT3 R	353
DNF	Pro	8	(United Kingdom) Bentley Team M-Sport	(Monaco) Vincent Abril (Spain) Andy Soucek (Belgium) Maxime Soulet	Bentley Continental GT3 (2018)	349
DNF	Silver	111	(Germany) Aust Motorsport	(Germany) Tobias Dauenhauer (Switzerland) Philipp Frommenwiler (Netherlands) Loris Hezemans (Switzerland) Nikolaj Rogivue	Audi R8 LMS	342
DNF	Pro	82	(Austria) GRT Grasser Racing Team	(Switzerland) Rolf Ineichen (United Kingdom) Phil Keen (France) Franck Perera	Lamborghini Huracán GT3	311
DNF	Silver	90	(France) AKKA ASP Team	(Germany) Nico Bastian (United Kingdom) Jack Manchester (Germany) Fabian Schiller (Netherlands) Jules Szymkowiak	Mercedes-AMG GT3	261
DNF	Am	666	(Germany) Attempto Racing	(Austria) Sven Heyrowsky (Germany) John-Louis Jasper (Switzerland) Jürgen Krebs (Switzerland) Tim Müller (Finland) Rory Penttinen	Lamborghini Huracán GT3	227
DNF	Pro	114	(Switzerland) Emil Frey Lexus Racing	(Monaco) Stéphane Ortelli (Finland) Markus Palttala (Austria) Norbert Siedler	Lexus RC F GT3	196
DNF	Pro-Am	31	(United Kingdom) Team Parker Racing	(United Kingdom) Andy Meyrick (United Kingdom) Seb Morris (United Kingdom) Derek Pierce (United Kingdom) Rob Smith	Bentley Continental GT3 (2016)	195
DNF	Pro	98	(Germany) Rowe Racing	(United Kingdom) Ricky Collard (Finland) Jesse Krohn (Germany) Marco Wittmann	BMW M6 GT3	194
DNF	Silver	28	(Italy) Daiko Lazarus Racing	(Italy) Fabrizio Crestani (Italy) Stefano Gattuso (Germany) Nicolas Pohler (France) Arno Santamato	Lamborghini Huracán GT3	135
DNF	Pro	44	(United Kingdom) Strakka Racing	(Brazil) Rubens Barrichello (Brazil) Felipe Fraga (Germany) Christian Vietoris	Mercedes-AMG GT3	117
DNF	Pro	63	(Austria) GRT Grasser Racing Team	(Italy) Mirko Bortolotti (Italy) Andrea Caldarelli (Germany) Christian Engelhart	Lamborghini Huracán GT3	113
DNF	Pro	17	(Belgium) Belgian Audi Club Team WRT	(Switzerland) Marcel Fässler (United Kingdom) Stuart Leonard (Brazil) Daniel Serra	Audi R8 LMS	93
DNF	Silver	97	Oman Racing with TF Sport	(Republic of Ireland) Charlie Eastwood (United Kingdom) Ross Gunn (Oman) Ahmad Al Harthy (United Kingdom) Euan McKay	Aston Martin V12 Vantage GT3	72
DNF	Am	89	(France) AKKA ASP Team	(France) Fabian Barthez (France) Eric Debard (Switzerland) Philippe Giauque (France) Nico Jamin	Mercedes-AMG GT3	43
DNF	Am	26	(France) Saintéloc Racing	(France) Simon Gachet (Belgium) Christian Kelders (France) Marc Rostan (France) Nyls Stievenart	Audi R8 LMS	39

Intercontinental GT Challenge
Previous race: Bathurst 12 Hour	2018 season	Next race: Suzuka 10 Hours
