= 2018 Suzuka 10 Hours =

Layout of the Suzuka International Racing Course

The 2018 Suzuka 10 Hours was endurance event that took place on August 26, 2018 at the Suzuka Circuit in Suzuka City, Japan. It was the 47th edition of the Summer Endurance Classic at Suzuka, and the first as part of the Intercontinental GT Challenge, running under the ten-hour format (the race having previously been a 1000-kilometer format). The race was won by the GruppeM Racing team with Maro Engel, Raffaele Marciello and Tristan Vautier driving.

Due to regulation change, GT300 cars were still eligible to race in Suzuka 10 Hours, while GT500 cars were banned.

== Classification ==
Pos	Car No.	Class	Entrant	Drivers	Vehicle	Laps
1	888	P	(Hong Kong) Mercedes-AMG Team GruppeM Racing	(Germany) Maro Engel (Italy) Raffaele Marciello (France) Tristan Vautier	Mercedes-AMG GT3	276
2	43	P	(United Kingdom) Mercedes-AMG Team Strakka Racing	(Germany) Maximilian Götz (Portugal) Álvaro Parente (United Kingdom) Lewis Williamson	Mercedes-AMG GT3	276
3	6	P	(China) Audi Sport Team Absolute Racing	(Germany) Christopher Haase (South Africa) Kelvin van der Linde (Germany) Markus Winkelhock	Audi R8 LMS	276
4	66	P	(Belgium) Audi Sport Team WRT	(Germany) Christopher Mies (Belgium) Dries Vanthoor (Belgium) Frédéric Vervisch	Audi R8 LMS	276
5	00	P	(Japan) Mercedes-AMG Team Good Smile	(Japan) Tatsuya Kataoka (Japan) Kamui Kobayashi (Japan) Nobuteru Taniguchi	Mercedes-AMG GT3	275
6	08	P	(United Kingdom) Bentley Team M-Sport	(Monaco) Vincent Abril (Spain) Andy Soucek (Belgium) Maxime Soulet	Bentley Continental GT3	275
7	44	P	(United Kingdom) Strakka Racing	(Germany) Maximilian Buhk (United Kingdom) Oliver Rowland (France) Adrien Tambay	Mercedes-AMG GT3	275
8	21	P	(Japan) Audi Sport Team Hitotsuyama	(United Kingdom) Richard Lyons (Belgium) Alessio Picariello (Japan) Ryuichiro Tomita	Audi R8 LMS	275
9	17	P	(Belgium) Audi Sport Team WRT	(United Kingdom) Jake Dennis (United Kingdom) Stuart Leonard (South Africa) Sheldon van der Linde	Audi R8 LMS	275
10	75	PA	(United States) SunEnergy1 Racing	(Canada) Mikaël Grenier (Australia) Kenny Habul (Germany) Luca Stolz	Mercedes-AMG GT3	275
11	991	P	(Hong Kong) Craft-Bamboo Racing	(France) Kévin Estre (France) Mathieu Jaminet (Belgium) Laurens Vanthoor	Porsche 911 GT3 R	275
12	911	P	(Germany) Manthey Racing	(France) Romain Dumas (France) Frédéric Makowiecki (Germany) Dirk Werner	Porsche 911 GT3 R	275
13	28	PA	(Chinese Taipei) HubAuto Corsa	(Australia) Nick Foster (South Africa) David Perel (Japan) Hiroki Yoshida	Ferrari 488 GT3	275
14	11	P	(Japan) GAINER	(Japan) Katsuyuki Hiranaka (Japan) Kazuki Hoshino (Japan) Hironobu Yasuda	Nissan GT-R Nismo GT3	274
15	88	P	(Japan) JLOC	(Italy) Andrea Caldarelli (Japan) Kazuki Hiramine (Italy) Marco Mapelli	Lamborghini Huracán GT3	273
16	8	P	(Japan) ARN Racing	(Japan) Kohei Hirate (Japan) Hiroaki Nagai (Japan) Koki Saga	Ferrari 488 GT3	273
17	87	PA	(Japan) JLOC	(Japan) Taiyo Iida (Japan) Yuya Motojima (Japan) Kimiya Sato	Lamborghini Huracán GT3	273
18	10	P	(Japan) Honda Team Motul	(Japan) Hideki Mutoh (Japan) Daisuke Nakajima (Japan) Naoki Yamamoto	Honda NSX GT3	272
19	54	PA	(United States) Black Swan Racing	(Netherlands) Jeroen Bleekemolen (United States) Marc Miller (United States) Tim Pappas	Porsche 911 GT3 R	271
20	91	PA	(Chinese Taipei) Singha-Team AAI	(United Kingdom) Tom Blomqvist (Japan) Akira Iida (Thailand) Piti Bhirombhakdi	BMW M6 GT3	270
21	34	P	(Japan) Modulo Drago Corse	(Japan) Takashi Kogure (Japan) Ryo Michigami (Japan) Hiroki Otsu	Honda NSX GT3	270
22	13	PA	(China) Absolute Racing	(China) Congfu Cheng (Hong Kong) Adderly Fong (China) Jingzu Sun	Audi R8 LMS	270
23	777	PA	(Japan) CarGuy Racing	(Japan) Kei Cozzolino (Japan) Takeshi Kimura (Japan) Naoki Yokomizo	Honda NSX GT3	268
24	27	P	(Chinese Taipei) HubAuto Corsa	(Republic of Ireland) Matt Griffin (Spain) Miguel Molina (Italy) Davide Rigon	Ferrari 488 GT3	267
25	112	Am	(Japan) Sato, Yamashita-SS/Rn-Sports	(Japan) Norio Kubo (Japan) Atsushi Sato (Japan) Ryosei Yamashita	Mercedes-AMG GT3	264
26	37	PA	(Germany) Callaway Competition with Bingo Racing	(Japan) Yuta Kamimura (Japan) Yuichi Mikasa (Japan) Shinji Takei	Chevrolet Corvette C7 GT3-R	260
27	18	P	(Japan) Team UpGarage	(Japan) Takuto Iguchi (Japan) Takashi Kobayashi (Japan) Yuhki Nakayama	Toyota 86 MC	246
28	77	PA	(Japan) D'station Racing	(New Zealand) Jono Lester (Japan) Satoshi Hoshino (Japan) Tsubasa Kondo	Porsche 911 GT3 R	246
29	07	P	(United Kingdom) Bentley Team M-Sport	(France) Jules Gounon (United Kingdom) Steven Kane (South Africa) Jordan Pepper	Bentley Continental GT3	217
Not Classified
-	018	P	(Hong Kong) KCMG	(Japan) Katsumasa Chiyo (Japan) Tsugio Matsuda (Switzerland) Alexandre Imperatori	Nissan GT-R Nismo GT3	155
-	28	PA	(Japan) CarsTokaiDream28	(Japan) Hiroshi Hamaguchi (Japan) Hiroki Katoh (Japan) Kazuho Takahashi	Lotus Evora MC	98
-	23	P	(Hong Kong) KCMG	(United Kingdom) Richard Bradley (United Kingdom) Oliver Jarvis (Italy) Edoardo Liberati	Nissan GT-R Nismo GT3	95
-	58	P	(United Kingdom) Garage 59	(United Kingdom) Ben Barnicoat (United Kingdom) Andrew Watson (France) Côme Ledogar	McLaren 650S GT3	77
-	7	P	(Japan) D'station Racing	(New Zealand) Earl Bamber (Japan) Tomonobu Fujii (Germany) Sven Müller	Porsche 911 GT3 R	72
-	42	PA	(United Kingdom) Strakka Racing	(Brazil) Felipe Fraga (Italy) David Fumanelli (United Kingdom) Nick Leventis	Mercedes-AMG GT3	22

== Notes ==
Intercontinental GT Challenge
Previous race: 24 Hours of Spa	2018 season	Next race: California 8 Hours
