= 2018 California 8 Hours =

Race details
Date	28 October 2018
Location	Monterey, United States
Course	3.602 km (2.238 mi)
- Race

Pole
Drivers	(Germany) Christopher Haase (South Africa) Kelvin van der Linde (Germany) Christopher Mies	(Germany) Audi Sport Team Land
Time	1:23.660

Podium
First	(Germany) Christopher Haase (South Africa) Kelvin van der Linde (Germany) Christopher Mies	(Germany) Audi Sport Team Land
Second	(Netherlands) Robin Frijns (Belgium) Dries Vanthoor (Germany) Markus Winkelhock	(Belgium) Audi Sport Team WRT
Third	(Germany) Maximilian Buhk (Germany) Maro Engel (France) Tristan Vautier	(United States) Mercedes-AMG Team SunEnergy1 Racing

The 2018 WeatherTech Raceway California 8 Hours was the second edition of the WeatherTech Raceway California 8 Hours race held on WeatherTech Raceway Laguna Seca on 28 October 2018. The race was contested with GT3-spec cars, GT Cup-spec cars, GT4-spec cars, MARC cars and TCR-touring cars. The race was organized by the Stéphane Ratel Organisation (SRO).

The second annual California 8 Hours is the fourth and final round of the 2018 Intercontinental GT Challenge.

== Entries ==
No.	Entrant	Car	Class	Driver 1	Driver 2	Driver 3
GT3 Entries
7	(United Kingdom) Bentley Team M-Sport	Bentley Continental GT3 (2018)	P	(France) Jules Gounon	(United Kingdom) Steven Kane	(South Africa) Jordan Pepper
8	(United Kingdom) Bentley Team M-Sport	Bentley Continental GT3 (2018)	P	(Monaco) Vincent Abril	(Spain) Andy Soucek	(Belgium) Maxime Soulet
9	(United States) K-PAX Racing	Bentley Continental GT3 (2016)	P	(Brazil) Rodrigo Baptista	(Portugal) Álvaro Parente	(United States) Bryan Sellers
17	(Belgium) Audi Sport Team WRT	Audi R8 LMS	P	(United Kingdom) Stuart Leonard	(South Africa) Sheldon van der Linde	(Spain) Alex Riberas
19	(Belgium) Audi Sport Team WRT	Audi R8 LMS	P	(Netherlands) Robin Frijns	(Belgium) Dries Vanthoor	(Germany) Markus Winkelhock
29	(Germany) Audi Sport Team Land	Audi R8 LMS	P	(Germany) Christopher Haase	(South Africa) Kelvin van der Linde	(Germany) Christopher Mies
33	(Slovakia) ARC Bratislava	BMW M6 GT3	PA	(Latvia) Konstantīns Calko	(Slovakia) Miro Konôpka	(Poland) Andrzej Lewandowski
42	(United Kingdom) Strakka Racing	Mercedes-AMG GT3	PA	(Brazil) Felipe Fraga	(Italy) David Fumanelli	(United Kingdom) Nick Leventis
43	(United Kingdom) Mercedes-AMG Team Strakka Racing	Mercedes-AMG GT3	P	(Germany) Maximilian Götz	(Italy) Raffaele Marciello	(United Kingdom) Lewis Williamson
44	(United Kingdom) Strakka Racing	Mercedes-AMG GT3	P	(United Kingdom) Jack Hawksworth	(France) Adrien Tambay	(Germany) Christian Vietoris
46	(United States) PPM	Lamborghini Huracán GT3	PA	(United States) Steve Dunn	(United States) Brandon Gdovic	(Japan) Shinya Michimi
54	(United States) Black Swan Racing	Porsche 911 GT3 R	P	(Netherlands) Jeroen Bleekemolen	(United States) Patrick Long	(United States) Tim Pappas
63	(United States) DXDT Racing	Mercedes-AMG GT3	PA	(United States) David Askew	(United Kingdom) Ryan Dalziel	(United States) Mike Hedlund
75	(Australia) SunEnergy1 Racing	Mercedes-AMG GT3	PA	(Canada) Mikaël Grenier	(Australia) Kenny Habul	(Germany) Luca Stolz
87	(United States) Vital Speed Motorsport	Ferrari 488 GT3	P	(United States) Trevor Baek	(United Kingdom) Marino Franchitti	(United States) Jeff Westphal
175	(Australia) Mercedes-AMG Team SunEnergy1 Racing	Mercedes-AMG GT3	P	(Germany) Maximilian Buhk	(Germany) Maro Engel	(France) Tristan Vautier
911	(United States) Porsche Motorsport North America by Wright Motorsports	Porsche 911 GT3 R	P	(France) Romain Dumas	(France) Frédéric Makowiecki	(Germany) Dirk Werner
GT Cup Entries
6	(United States) US RaceTronics	Lamborghini Huracán Super Trofeo Evo		(United States) Steven Aghakhani	(United States) Richard Antinucci	(United Kingdom) Taylor Proto
GT4 Entries
2	(United States) GMG Racing	Audi R8 LMS GT4		(United States) Jason Bell	(United States) Andrew Davis	(United States) James Sofronas
10	(United States) PF Racing	Ford Mustang GT4		(United States) Jade Buford	(Canada) Scott Maxwell	(United States) James Pesek
12	(United States) Ian Lacy Racing	Ginetta G55 GT4		(United States) Frank Gannett	(United States) Ian Lacy	(United States) Drew Staveley
22	(United States) Automatic Racing	Aston Martin V8 Vantage GT4		(United States) Charles Espenlaub	(United States) Eric Lux	(United States) Charles Putnam
34	(United States) Murillo Racing	Mercedes-AMG GT4		(United States) Matt Fassnacht	(United States) Christian Szymczak	
51	(United States) Team Panoz Racing	Panoz Avezzano GT4		(United States) Preston Calvert	(United States) Ian James	(United States) Matt Keegan
65	(United States) Murillo Racing	Mercedes-AMG GT4		(United States) Jeff Mosing	(United States) Justin Piscitell	(United States) Tim Probert
66	(United States) TRG	Porsche Cayman GT4 Clubsport MR		(United States) Derek DeBoer	(United States) Sean Gibbons	(United States) Spencer Pumpelly
67	(United States) TRG	Porsche Cayman GT4 Clubsport MR		(United States) Chris Bellomo	(United States) Tom Dyer	(United States) Robert Orcutt
88	(United States) Stephen Cameron Racing	BMW M4 GT4		(United States) Gregory Liefooghe	(United States) Sean Quinlan	(United States) Henry Schmitt
91	(United States) Rearden Racing	Audi R8 LMS GT4		(United States) James Burke	(United States) Jeff Burton	(United States) Jessica Burton
113	(United States) RHC-Jorgensen/Strom	BMW M4 GT4		(United States) Daren Jorgensen	(United States) Jon Miller	(United States) Brett Strom
626	(United States) Rearden Racing	Audi R8 LMS GT4		(United States) Jeff Kearl	(United States) Vesko Kozarov	(United States) Lara Tallman
TCR Entries
23	(United States) M1 GT Racing	Audi RS 3 LMS TCR		(United States) Walter Bowlin	(Canada) Jerimy Daniel	(United Kingdom) Lars Viljoen
98	(United States) Bryan Herta Autosport with Curb-Agajanian	Hyundai i30 N TCR		(United States) Bryan Herta	(United States) Colton Herta	(United States) George Kurtz
99	(United States) Bryan Herta Autosport with Curb-Agajanian	Hyundai i30 N TCR		(United States) Michael Lewis	(Canada) Mark Wilkins	(United States) Mason Filippi

Icon	Class
P	Pro Cup
PA	Pro-Am Cup

== Official results ==
Bold denotes category winner. Results validated on 26 June 2019 following an FIA-related hearing.

Pos.	Class	No.	Team/Entrant	Drivers	Car	Laps
1	**GT3 Pro**	**29**	**(Germany) Audi Sport Team Land**	**(Germany) Christopher Haase** **(South Africa) Kelvin van der Linde** **(Germany) Christopher Mies**	**Audi R8 LMS**	**306**
2	GT3 Pro	19	(Belgium) Audi Sport Team WRT	(Netherlands) Robin Frijns (Belgium) Dries Vanthoor (Germany) Markus Winkelhock	Audi R8 LMS	306
3	GT3 Pro	175	(United States) Mercedes-AMG Team SunEnergy1 Racing	(Germany) Maximilian Buhk (Germany) Maro Engel (France) Tristan Vautier	Mercedes-AMG GT3	306
4	GT3 Pro	911	(United States) Wright Motorsports	(France) Romain Dumas (France) Frédéric Makowiecki (Germany) Dirk Werner	Porsche 911 GT3 R	306
5	GT3 Pro	17	(Belgium) Audi Sport Team WRT	(United Kingdom) Stuart Leonard (South Africa) Sheldon van der Linde (Spain) Alex Riberas	Audi R8 LMS	306
6	GT3 Pro	8	(United Kingdom) Bentley Team M-Sport	(Monaco) Vincent Abril (Spain) Andy Soucek (Belgium) Maxime Soulet	Bentley Continental GT3 (2018)	305
7	GT3 Pro	43	(United Kingdom) Mercedes-AMG Team Strakka Racing	(Germany) Maximilian Götz (Italy) Raffaele Marciello (United Kingdom) Lewis Williamson	Mercedes-AMG GT3	304
8	GT3 Pro	44	(United Kingdom) Strakka Racing	(United Kingdom) Jack Hawksworth (France) Adrien Tambay (Germany) Christian Vietoris	Mercedes-AMG GT3	303
9	GT3 Pro	54	(United States) Black Swan Racing	(Netherlands) Jeroen Bleekemolen (United States) Patrick Long (United States) Tim Pappas	Porsche 911 GT3 R	303
10	GT3 Pro	9	(United States) K-PAX Racing	(Brazil) Rodrigo Baptista (Portugal) Álvaro Parente (United States) Bryan Sellers	Bentley Continental GT3 (2016)	302
11	GT3	7	(United Kingdom) Bentley Team M-Sport	(France) Jules Gounon (United Kingdom) Steven Kane (South Africa) Jordan Pepper	Bentley Continental GT3 (2018)	297
12	**GT3 Pro-Am**	**2**	**(United States) DXDT Racing**	**(United States) David Askew** **(United Kingdom) Ryan Dalziel** **(United States) Mike Hedlund**	**Mercedes-AMG GT3**	**296**
13	**GTC**	**6**	**(United States) US RaceTronics**	**(United States) Steven Aghakhani** **(United States) Richard Antinucci** **(United Kingdom) Taylor Proto**	**Lamborghini Huracán Super Tropheo Evo**	**291**
14	GT3 Pro-Am	46	(United States) PPM	(United States) Steven Dunn (United States) Brandon Gdovic (Japan) Shinya Michimi	Lamborghini Huracán GT3	283
15	**GT4**	**626**	**(United States) Rearden Racing**	**(United States) Jeff Kearl** **(United States) Vesko Kozarov** **(United States) Lara Tallman**	**Audi R8 LMS GT4**	**281**
16	GT4	66	(United States) TRG	(United States) Derek DeBoer (United States) Sean Gibbons (United States) Spencer Pumpelly	Porsche Cayman GT4 Clubsport MR	280
17	GT4	65	(United States) Murillo Racing	(United States) Jeff Mosing (United States) Justin Piscitell (United States) Tim Probert	Mercedes-AMG GT4	280
18	GT4	12	(United States) Ian Lacy Racing	(United States) Frank Gannett (United States) Ian Lacy (United States) Drew Staveley	Ginetta G55 GT4	280
19	GT4	88	(United States) Stephen Cameron Racing	(United States) Gregory Liefooghe (United States) Sean Quinlan (United States) Henry Schmitt	BMW M4 GT4	278
20	**TCR**	**98**	**(United States) Bryan Herta Autosport with Curb-Agajanian**	**(United States) Bryan Herta** **(United States) Colton Herta** **(United States) George Kurtz**	**Hyundai i30 N TCR**	**276**
21	GT4	91	(United States) Rearden Racing	(United States) James Burke (United States) Jeff Burton (United States) Jessica Burton	Rudi R8 LMS GT4	272
22	GT4	113	(United States) RHC-Jorgensen/Strom	(United States) Daren Jorgensen (United States) Jon Miller (United States) Brett Strom	BMW M4 GT4	272
23	GT4	34	(United States) Murillo Racing	(United States) Matt Fassnacht (United States) Christian Szymczak	Mercedes-AMG GT4	263
24	GT4	67	(United States) TRG	(United States) Chris Bellomo (United States) Tom Dyer (United States) Robert Orcutt	Porsche Cayman GT4 Clubsport MR	256
25	GT4	22	(United States) Automatic Racing	(United States) Charles Espenlaub (United States) Eric Lux (United States) Charles Putnam	Aston Martin V8 Vantage GT4	237
26	GT3 Pro-Am	75	(United States) SunEnergy1 Racing	(Canada) Mikaël Grenier (Australia) Kenny Habul (Germany) Luca Stolz	Mercedes-AMG GT3	219
27	GT4	2	(United States) GMG Racing	(United States) Jason Bell (United States) Andrew Davis (United States) James Sofronas	Audi R8 LMS GT4	217
DNF	GT4	10	(United States) PF Racing	(United States) Jade Buford (Canada) Scott Maxwell (United States) James Pesek	Ford Mustang GT4	194
DNF	GT3 Pro	87	(United States) Vital Speed Motorsport	(United States) Trevor Baek (United Kingdom) Marino Franchitti (United States) Jeff Westphal	Ferrari 488 GT3	112
DNF	GT4	51	(United States) Team Panoz Racing	(United States) Preston Calvert (United States) Ian James (United States) Matt Keegan	Panoz Avezzano GT4	81
DNF	TCR	99	(United States) Bryan Herta Autosport with Curb-Agajanian	(United States) Michael Lewis (Canada) Mark Wilkins (United States) Mason Filippi	Hyundai i30 N TCR	58
DNS	GT3 Pro-Am	33	(Slovakia) ARC Bratislava	(Latvia) Konstantīns Calko (Slovakia) Miro Konôpka (Poland) Andrzej Lewandowski	BMW M6 GT3	0
DNS	TCR	23	(United States) M1 GT Racing	(United States) Walter Bowlin (Canada) Jerimy Daniel (United Kingdom) Lars Viljoen	Audi RS3 LMS TCR	0
DQ	GT3 Pro-Am	42	(United Kingdom) Strakka Racing	(Brazil) Felipe Fraga (Italy) David Fumanelli (United Kingdom) Nick Leventis	Mercedes-AMG GT3	304

NOTE: The No. 42 Strakka Racing Mercedes-AMG GT that had finished eighth overall, and first in GT3 Pro-Am, was disqualified under after driver Nick Leventis was found in violation of FIA doping regulations. Leventis' urine sample was taken to the Sports Medicine Research & Testing Laboratory at the University of Utah in Salt Lake City, Utah, where it tested positive for anastrozole (an exogenous aromatase inhibitor, prohibited under S4.1 of the FIA Anti-Doping Code), drostanolone and related metabolite 2α-methyl-5α-androstan-3α-ol-17-one, which are exogenous anabolic 3 androgenic steroids, prohibited under S1.1.a of the FIA Anti-Doping Code). The results were altered on 26 June 2019 after an official report of the positive test.

Intercontinental GT Challenge
Previous race: Suzuka 10 Hours	2018 season	Next race: none
