= Tim Pappas =

American racing driver

- Nationality: American
- Born: Timothy Angelus Pappas; September 14, 1973 (age 53) New York City, New York, U.S.

American Le Mans Series career
- Current team: Black Swan Racing
- Categorisation: FIA Silver (until 2016); FIA Bronze (2017–)
- Former teams: Team Trans Sport

Previous series
- Rolex Sports Car Series,

Championship titles
- 2010-2011: ALMS GTC Championship

Timothy Angelus Pappas (born September 14, 1973 in New York City) is an American racing driver and businessman who competes in the American Le Mans Series with his Black Swan Racing team. He won the 2010 and 2011 American Le Mans Series GTC Drivers Championships and is the president of Pappas Enterprises Inc., his family's four-decade old real estate company.

== Early racing career ==
Pappas began his professional driving career in 2000 in Continental Tire Sports Car Challenge competition before making select Rolex Sports Car Series starts. In 2005, he drove a BMW 330i to two podiums and six top-ten finishes in the Continental Tire Sports Car Challenge

== American Le Mans Series ==
In 2007, Pappas made his debut in the American Le Mans Series with his Team Trans Sport organization. Making 11 starts in his rookie season with Terry Borcheller in a Porsche 911 GT3 RSR, Pappas scored a season-best fourth-place finish in the GT2 category at the Petit Le Mans, while collecting four top-five finishes in total.

Running under the Black Swan Racing banner, Pappas debuted a new Doran Ford GT-R for 2008, making six starts in the GT2 category with co-driver Anthony Lazzaro.

Pappas and his Black Swan team took one year off before moving to the newly formed GTC category in 2010, earning his and the team's first class championship after four wins and eight podium finishes in as many starts. In 2011, Pappas and regular co-driver Jeroen Bleekemolen repeated as GTC champions with another four class victories and three second-place finishes in nine starts.

The 2012 season saw Pappas and Black Swan step up to P2 with a Lola B11/80 Honda, leased from Level 5 Motorsports. While kicking off the season with a podium at the 2012 12 Hours of Sebring an early race accident in the second round of the season at Long Beach led to the team withdrawing from P2 competition due to a lack of spare parts amid Lola's financial administration.

== Personal life ==
Pappas is the president of Pappas Enterprises Inc., his family's four-decade old real estate company based in Boston, Massachusetts. Additionally, Pappas holds a film degree from New York University.

== Motorsports career results ==
=== Complete IMSA SportsCar Championship results ===
(key) (Races in bold indicate pole position) (Races in italics indicate fastest lap)

Year	Team	Class	Make	Engine	1	2	3	4	5	6	7	8	9	10	11	12	Pos.	Pts	Ref
2014	Flying Lizard Motorsports	GTD	Audi R8 LMS ultra	Audi 5.2L V10	DAY; 2	SEB	LGA	DET	WGL	MOS	IND	ELK	VIR	COA	COA		58th	33	
2016	Black Swan Racing	GTD	Porsche 911 GT3 R	Porsche 4.0L Flat-6	DAY; 2	SEB; 13	LGA; 17	BEL; WD	WGL; 7	MOS	LIM; 12	ELK	VIR	AUS	PET		15th	112	
2017	TRG	GTD	Porsche 911 GT3 R	Porsche 4.0 L Flat-6	DAY; 10	SEB	LBH	AUS	BEL	WGL	MOS	LIM	ELK	VIR	LGA	PET	66th	21	
2018	Park Place Motorsports	GTD	Porsche 911 GT3 R	Porsche 4.0L Flat-6	DAY; 18	SEB; 9	MOH	BEL	WGL	MOS	LIM	ELK	VIR	LGA	PET; 13		38th	53	
2019	Black Swan Racing	GTD	Porsche 911 GT3 R	Porsche 4.0L Flat-6	DAY; 14	SEB	MDO	DET	WGL	MOS	LIM	ELK	VIR	LGA	PET		62nd	17	
2020	Black Swan Racing	GTD	Porsche 911 GT3 R	Porsche 4.0 L Flat-6	DAY; 5	DAY	SEB	ELK	VIR	ATL	MDO	CLT	PET	LGA	SEB		43rd	26	

== 24 Hours of Le Mans results ==
Year	Team	Co-Drivers	Car	Class	Laps	Pos.	Class Pos.
2018	(Germany) Proton Competition	(United States) Patrick Long (United States) Spencer Pumpelly	Porsche 911 RSR	GTE; Am	334	29th	4th
