= 2017 Intercontinental GT Challenge =

Sports car racing series

The 2017 Intercontinental GT Challenge was the second season of the Intercontinental GT Challenge. The season featured three rounds, starting with the Liqui Moly Bathurst 12 Hour on 5 February and concluding with the Mazda Raceway California 8 Hours on 15 October, after the SRO Motorsports Group chose to cancel the Sepang 12 Hours scheduled for 10 December, due to a lack of entries. Laurens Vanthoor was the defending drivers' champion and Audi was the defending manufacturers' champion.

In contrast to the inaugural season, manufacturers no longer needed to enter their cars separately. In 2017, as long as they held an international licence, all cars and drivers entered in the overall GT3 class, together with the manufacturers in the overall GT4 class were automatically eligible to score points towards the titles.

== Calendar ==
Round	Event	Circuit	Date	Report
1	Liqui Moly Bathurst 12 Hour	Mount Panorama Circuit, Bathurst, Australia	5 February	Report
2	Total 24 Hours of Spa	Circuit de Spa-Francorchamps, Spa, Belgium	29–30 July	Report
3	Mazda Raceway California 8 Hours	Mazda Raceway Laguna Seca, Monterey, United States	15 October	Report
Cancelled due to a lack of entries
Race		Circuit		Original Date
Motul Sepang 12 Hours		Sepang International Circuit, Sepang, Malaysia		10 December

Also part of the Blancpain GT Series Endurance Cup

== Entry list ==
=== GT3 ===
Manufacturer	Team	Car	No.	Drivers	Class	Rounds
Acura	(United States) RealTime Racing	NSX GT3	43	(United States) Dane Cameron	P	3
Acura	(United States) RealTime Racing	NSX GT3	43	(United States) Tom Dyer	P	3
Acura	(United States) RealTime Racing	NSX GT3	43	(United States) Ryan Eversley	P	3
Acura	(United States) RealTime Racing	NSX GT3	93	(France) Jules Gounon	P	3
Acura	(United States) RealTime Racing	NSX GT3	93	(Netherlands) Peter Kox	P	3
Acura	(United States) RealTime Racing	NSX GT3	93	(Canada) Mark Wilkins	P	3
Aston Martin	(Australia) Miedecke Stone Motorsport	Vantage GT3	35	(Australia) Tony Bates	Am	1
Aston Martin	(Australia) Miedecke Stone Motorsport	Vantage GT3	35	(Australia) George Miedecke	Am	1
Aston Martin	(Australia) Miedecke Stone Motorsport	Vantage GT3	35	(Australia) Ashley Walsh	Am	1
Aston Martin	Oman Racing Team with TF Sport	Vantage GT3	97	(United Kingdom) Jonathan Adam	PA	2
Aston Martin	Oman Racing Team with TF Sport	Vantage GT3	97	(United Kingdom) Euan Hankey	PA	2
Aston Martin	Oman Racing Team with TF Sport	Vantage GT3	97	(Oman) Ahmad Al Harthy	PA	2
Aston Martin	Oman Racing Team with TF Sport	Vantage GT3	97	(Turkey) Salih Yoluç	PA	2
Audi	(Belgium) / Audi Sport Team WRT (Note: Cars No. 1, 2 and 5 entered as Audi Sport Team WRT, cars No. 3, 6 and 17 entered as Team WRT and car No. 11 entered as Belgian Audi Club Team WRT.); (Belgium) / Team WRT; (Belgium) / Belgian Audi Club Team WRT	R8 LMS	1	(Spain) Antonio García	P	2
Audi	(Belgium) / Audi Sport Team WRT; (Belgium) / Team WRT; (Belgium) / Belgian Audi Club Team WRT	R8 LMS	1	(Switzerland) Nico Müller	P	2
Audi	(Belgium) / Audi Sport Team WRT; (Belgium) / Team WRT; (Belgium) / Belgian Audi Club Team WRT	R8 LMS	1	(Germany) René Rast	P	2
Audi	(Belgium) / Audi Sport Team WRT; (Belgium) / Team WRT; (Belgium) / Belgian Audi Club Team WRT	R8 LMS	2	(Germany) Christopher Mies	P	2
Audi	(Belgium) / Audi Sport Team WRT; (Belgium) / Team WRT; (Belgium) / Belgian Audi Club Team WRT	R8 LMS	2	(United States) Connor De Phillippi	P	2
Audi	(Belgium) / Audi Sport Team WRT; (Belgium) / Team WRT; (Belgium) / Belgian Audi Club Team WRT	R8 LMS	2	(Belgium) Frédéric Vervisch	P	2
Audi	(Belgium) / Audi Sport Team WRT; (Belgium) / Team WRT; (Belgium) / Belgian Audi Club Team WRT	R8 LMS	3	(United Kingdom) Josh Caygill	PA	2
Audi	(Belgium) / Audi Sport Team WRT; (Belgium) / Team WRT; (Belgium) / Belgian Audi Club Team WRT	R8 LMS	3	(United Kingdom) Richard Lyons	PA	2
Audi	(Belgium) / Audi Sport Team WRT; (Belgium) / Team WRT; (Belgium) / Belgian Audi Club Team WRT	R8 LMS	3	(Austria) Nikolaus Mayr-Melnhof	PA	2
Audi	(Belgium) / Audi Sport Team WRT; (Belgium) / Team WRT; (Belgium) / Belgian Audi Club Team WRT	R8 LMS	3	(Australia) Jonathan Venter	PA	2
Audi	(Belgium) / Audi Sport Team WRT; (Belgium) / Team WRT; (Belgium) / Belgian Audi Club Team WRT	R8 LMS	5	(Switzerland) Marcel Fässler	P	2
Audi	(Belgium) / Audi Sport Team WRT; (Belgium) / Team WRT; (Belgium) / Belgian Audi Club Team WRT	R8 LMS	5	(Germany) André Lotterer	P	2
Audi	(Belgium) / Audi Sport Team WRT; (Belgium) / Team WRT; (Belgium) / Belgian Audi Club Team WRT	R8 LMS	5	(Belgium) Dries Vanthoor	P	2
Audi	(Belgium) / Audi Sport Team WRT; (Belgium) / Team WRT; (Belgium) / Belgian Audi Club Team WRT	R8 LMS	6	(France) Nathanaël Berthon	P	2
Audi	(Belgium) / Audi Sport Team WRT; (Belgium) / Team WRT; (Belgium) / Belgian Audi Club Team WRT	R8 LMS	6	(Monaco) Stéphane Richelmi	P	2
Audi	(Belgium) / Audi Sport Team WRT; (Belgium) / Team WRT; (Belgium) / Belgian Audi Club Team WRT	R8 LMS	6	(France) Benoît Tréluyer	P	2
Audi	(Belgium) / Audi Sport Team WRT; (Belgium) / Team WRT; (Belgium) / Belgian Audi Club Team WRT	R8 LMS	11	(United Kingdom) Jake Dennis	P	3
Audi	(Belgium) / Audi Sport Team WRT; (Belgium) / Team WRT; (Belgium) / Belgian Audi Club Team WRT	R8 LMS	11	(Netherlands) Robin Frijns	P	3
Audi	(Belgium) / Audi Sport Team WRT; (Belgium) / Team WRT; (Belgium) / Belgian Audi Club Team WRT	R8 LMS	11	(United Kingdom) Stuart Leonard	P	3
Audi	(Belgium) / Audi Sport Team WRT; (Belgium) / Team WRT; (Belgium) / Belgian Audi Club Team WRT	R8 LMS	17	(United Kingdom) Jake Dennis	P	2
Audi	(Belgium) / Audi Sport Team WRT; (Belgium) / Team WRT; (Belgium) / Belgian Audi Club Team WRT	R8 LMS	17	(United Kingdom) Jamie Green	P	2
Audi	(Belgium) / Audi Sport Team WRT; (Belgium) / Team WRT; (Belgium) / Belgian Audi Club Team WRT	R8 LMS	17	(United Kingdom) Stuart Leonard	P	2
Audi	(Australia) DJS Racing	R8 LMS ultra	2	(Australia) James Bergmuller	Am	1
Audi	(Australia) DJS Racing	R8 LMS ultra	2	(New Zealand) Samuel Fillmore	Am	1
Audi	(Australia) DJS Racing	R8 LMS ultra	2	(Australia) Daniel Stutterd	Am	1
Audi	(Australia) Team ASR	R8 LMS	3	(New Zealand) Daniel Gaunt	PA	1
Audi	(Australia) Team ASR	R8 LMS	3	(New Zealand) Matt Halliday	PA	1
Audi	(Australia) Team ASR	R8 LMS	3	(Australia) Ash Samadi	PA	1
Audi	(Australia) GT Motorsport	R8 LMS	5	(Australia) Nathan Antunes	Am	1
Audi	(Australia) GT Motorsport	R8 LMS	5	(Australia) Elliot Barbour	Am	1
Audi	(Australia) GT Motorsport	R8 LMS	5	(Australia) Greg Taylor	Am	1
Audi	(Australia) Hallmarc	R8 LMS	9	(Australia) Marc Cini	PA	1
Audi	(Australia) Hallmarc	R8 LMS	9	(Australia) Dean Fiore	PA	1
Audi	(Australia) Hallmarc	R8 LMS	9	(Australia) Lee Holdsworth	PA	1
Audi	(France) / Audi Sport Team Saintéloc (Note: Car No. 25 entered as Audi Sport Team Saintéloc and car No. 26 entered as Saintéloc Racing.); (France) / Saintéloc Racing	R8 LMS	25	(France) Jules Gounon	P	2
Audi	(France) / Audi Sport Team Saintéloc; (France) / Saintéloc Racing	R8 LMS	25	(Germany) Christopher Haase	P	2
Audi	(France) / Audi Sport Team Saintéloc; (France) / Saintéloc Racing	R8 LMS	25	(Germany) Markus Winkelhock	P	2
Audi	(France) / Audi Sport Team Saintéloc; (France) / Saintéloc Racing	R8 LMS	26	(Belgium) Frédéric Bouvy	Am	2
Audi	(France) / Audi Sport Team Saintéloc; (France) / Saintéloc Racing	R8 LMS	26	(Belgium) Christian Kelders	Am	2
Audi	(France) / Audi Sport Team Saintéloc; (France) / Saintéloc Racing	R8 LMS	26	(France) Marc Rostan	Am	2
Audi	(Germany) Audi Sport Team Land	R8 LMS	29	(Germany) Christopher Haase	P	3
Audi	(Germany) Audi Sport Team Land	R8 LMS	29	(Germany) Christopher Mies	P	3
Audi	(Germany) Audi Sport Team Land	R8 LMS	29	(United States) Connor De Phillippi	P	3
Audi	(United States) Audi Sport Team Magnus	R8 LMS	44	(Germany) Pierre Kaffer	P	3
Audi	(United States) Audi Sport Team Magnus	R8 LMS	44	(South Africa) Kelvin van der Linde	P	3
Audi	(United States) Audi Sport Team Magnus	R8 LMS	44	(Germany) Markus Winkelhock	P	3
Audi	(Australia) Supabarn	R8 LMS	44	(New Zealand) Simon Evans	Am	1
Audi	(Australia) Supabarn	R8 LMS	44	(Australia) James Koundouris	Am	1
Audi	(Australia) Supabarn	R8 LMS	44	(Australia) Theo Koundouris	Am	1
Audi	(Australia) Supabarn	R8 LMS	44	(Australia) Marcus Marshall	Am	1
Audi	(Australia) Jamec Pem Racing	R8 LMS	74	(Netherlands) Robin Frijns	P	1
Audi	(Australia) Jamec Pem Racing	R8 LMS	74	(Germany) Frank Stippler	P	1
Audi	(Australia) Jamec Pem Racing	R8 LMS	74	(Germany) Markus Winkelhock	P	1
Audi	(Australia) Jamec Pem Racing	R8 LMS	75	(Germany) Christopher Haase	P	1
Audi	(Australia) Jamec Pem Racing	R8 LMS	75	(Germany) Christopher Mies	P	1
Audi	(Australia) Jamec Pem Racing	R8 LMS	75	(Australia) Garth Tander	P	1
Audi	(Czech Republic) / ISR (Note: Car No. 75 entered as ISR and car No. 76 entered as Audi Sport Team ISR.); (Czech Republic) / Audi Sport Team ISR	R8 LMS	75	(Portugal) Filipe Albuquerque	P	2
Audi	(Czech Republic) / ISR; (Czech Republic) / Audi Sport Team ISR	R8 LMS	75	(Czech Republic) Filip Salaquarda	P	2
Audi	(Czech Republic) / ISR; (Czech Republic) / Audi Sport Team ISR	R8 LMS	75	(Austria) Clemens Schmid	P	2
Audi	(Czech Republic) / ISR; (Czech Republic) / Audi Sport Team ISR	R8 LMS	76	(Germany) Pierre Kaffer	P	2
Audi	(Czech Republic) / ISR; (Czech Republic) / Audi Sport Team ISR	R8 LMS	76	(South Africa) Kelvin van der Linde	P	2
Audi	(Czech Republic) / ISR; (Czech Republic) / Audi Sport Team ISR	R8 LMS	76	(Germany) Frank Stippler	P	2
Bentley	(United Kingdom) Bentley Team M-Sport	Continental GT3	7 (Note: Entered with No. 17 at Round 1.)	(United Kingdom) Oliver Jarvis	P	1–2
Bentley	(United Kingdom) Bentley Team M-Sport	Continental GT3	7	(United Kingdom) Steven Kane	P	1–2
Bentley	(United Kingdom) Bentley Team M-Sport	Continental GT3	7	(United Kingdom) Guy Smith	P	1–2
Bentley	(United Kingdom) Bentley Team M-Sport	Continental GT3	8	(Monaco) Vincent Abril	P	1–2
Bentley	(United Kingdom) Bentley Team M-Sport	Continental GT3	8	(Spain) Andy Soucek	P	1–2
Bentley	(United Kingdom) Bentley Team M-Sport	Continental GT3	8	(Belgium) Maxime Soulet	P	1–2
Bentley	(Germany) Bentley Team ABT	Continental GT3	9	(Germany) Christer Jöns	P	2
Bentley	(Germany) Bentley Team ABT	Continental GT3	9	(South Africa) Jordan Pepper	P	2
Bentley	(Germany) Bentley Team ABT	Continental GT3	9	(Belgium) Nico Verdonck	P	2
BMW	(Australia) / Team Castrol Vodafone (Note: Car No. 7 entered as Team Castrol Vodafone and car No. 60 entered as BMW Team SRM.); (Australia) / BMW Team SRM	M6 GT3	7	(Germany) Timo Glock	P	1
BMW	(Australia) / Team Castrol Vodafone; (Australia) / BMW Team SRM	M6 GT3	7	(Australia) Russell Ingall	P	1
BMW	(Australia) / Team Castrol Vodafone; (Australia) / BMW Team SRM	M6 GT3	7	(Australia) Tony Longhurst	P	1
BMW	(Australia) / Team Castrol Vodafone; (Australia) / BMW Team SRM	M6 GT3	7	(Australia) Mark Skaife	P	1
BMW	(Australia) / Team Castrol Vodafone; (Australia) / BMW Team SRM	M6 GT3	60	(New Zealand) Steve Richards	P	1
BMW	(Australia) / Team Castrol Vodafone; (Australia) / BMW Team SRM	M6 GT3	60	(Australia) Mark Winterbottom	P	1
BMW	(Australia) / Team Castrol Vodafone; (Australia) / BMW Team SRM	M6 GT3	60	(Germany) Marco Wittmann	P	1
BMW	(Germany) / Walkenhorst Motorsport (Note: Cars No. 35 and 36 entered as Walkenhorst Motorsport and car No. 99 entered as Walkenhorst.); (Germany) / Walkenhorst	M6 GT3	35	(Finland) Matias Henkola	PA	2
BMW	(Germany) / Walkenhorst Motorsport; (Germany) / Walkenhorst	M6 GT3	35	(Norway) Christian Krognes	PA	2
BMW	(Germany) / Walkenhorst Motorsport; (Germany) / Walkenhorst	M6 GT3	35	(Germany) Nico Menzel	PA	2
BMW	(Germany) / Walkenhorst Motorsport; (Germany) / Walkenhorst	M6 GT3	35	(Finland) Markus Palttala	PA	2
BMW	(Germany) / Walkenhorst Motorsport; (Germany) / Walkenhorst	M6 GT3	36	(Belgium) Stef Van Campenhout	Am	2
BMW	(Germany) / Walkenhorst Motorsport; (Germany) / Walkenhorst	M6 GT3	36	(Germany) Ralf Oeverhaus	Am	2
BMW	(Germany) / Walkenhorst Motorsport; (Germany) / Walkenhorst	M6 GT3	36	(Germany) David Schiwietz	Am	2
BMW	(Germany) / Walkenhorst Motorsport; (Germany) / Walkenhorst	M6 GT3	36	(Germany) Henry Walkenhorst	Am	2
BMW	(Germany) / Walkenhorst Motorsport; (Germany) / Walkenhorst	M6 GT3	99	(United Kingdom) Ricky Collard	P	1
BMW	(Germany) / Walkenhorst Motorsport; (Germany) / Walkenhorst	M6 GT3	99	(Germany) Nico Menzel	P	1
BMW	(Germany) / Walkenhorst Motorsport; (Germany) / Walkenhorst	M6 GT3	99	(Germany) Jörg Müller	P	1
BMW	MARC Cars Australia	M6 GT3	90	(Australia) Morgan Haber	Am	1
BMW	MARC Cars Australia	M6 GT3	90	(Australia) Chaz Mostert	Am	1
BMW	MARC Cars Australia	M6 GT3	90	(Australia) Max Twigg	Am	1
BMW	(Germany) Rowe Racing	M6 GT3	98	(United Kingdom) Tom Blomqvist	P	2
BMW	(Germany) Rowe Racing	M6 GT3	98	(Netherlands) Nick Catsburg	P	2
BMW	(Germany) Rowe Racing	M6 GT3	98	(Canada) Bruno Spengler	P	2
BMW	(Germany) Rowe Racing	M6 GT3	99	(Austria) Philipp Eng	P	2
BMW	(Germany) Rowe Racing	M6 GT3	99	(Belgium) Maxime Martin	P	2
BMW	(Germany) Rowe Racing	M6 GT3	99	(United Kingdom) Alexander Sims	P	2
Ferrari	(Switzerland) Kessel Racing	488 GT3	11	(Poland) Michał Broniszewski	PA	2
Ferrari	(Switzerland) Kessel Racing	488 GT3	11	(Italy) Matteo Cressoni	PA	2
Ferrari	(Switzerland) Kessel Racing	488 GT3	11	(Italy) Giacomo Piccini	PA	2
Ferrari	(Switzerland) Kessel Racing	488 GT3	11	(Italy) Andrea Rizzoli	PA	2
Ferrari	(Switzerland) Kessel Racing	488 GT3	888	(Italy) Niki Cadei	Am	2
Ferrari	(Switzerland) Kessel Racing	488 GT3	888	(Belgium) Jacques Duyver	Am	2
Ferrari	(Switzerland) Kessel Racing	488 GT3	888	(South Africa) David Perel	Am	2
Ferrari	(Switzerland) Kessel Racing	488 GT3	888	(Italy) Marco Zanuttini	Am	2
Ferrari	(Switzerland) Spirit of Race (Note: Cars No. 50, 53 and 961 entered as Spirit of Race under Swiss licence. Cars No. 51 and 52 entered as AF Corse and car No. 55 entered as Kaspersky Motorsport, both under Italian licence. Car No. 72 entered as SMP Racing under Russian licence.) (Italy) AF Corse (Italy) Kaspersky Motorsport (Russia) SMP Racing	488 GT3	50	(Thailand) Pasin Lathouras	P	2
Ferrari	(Switzerland) Spirit of Race (Italy) AF Corse (Italy) Kaspersky Motorsport (Russia) SMP Racing	488 GT3	50	(Italy) Alessandro Pier Guidi	P	2
Ferrari	(Switzerland) Spirit of Race (Italy) AF Corse (Italy) Kaspersky Motorsport (Russia) SMP Racing	488 GT3	50	(Italy) Michele Rugolo	P	2
Ferrari	(Switzerland) Spirit of Race (Italy) AF Corse (Italy) Kaspersky Motorsport (Russia) SMP Racing	488 GT3	51	(Monaco) Olivier Beretta	PA	2
Ferrari	(Switzerland) Spirit of Race (Italy) AF Corse (Italy) Kaspersky Motorsport (Russia) SMP Racing	488 GT3	51	(Italy) Lorenzo Bontempelli	PA	2
Ferrari	(Switzerland) Spirit of Race (Italy) AF Corse (Italy) Kaspersky Motorsport (Russia) SMP Racing	488 GT3	51	(Monaco) Francesco Castellacci	PA	2
Ferrari	(Switzerland) Spirit of Race (Italy) AF Corse (Italy) Kaspersky Motorsport (Russia) SMP Racing	488 GT3	51	(Japan) Motoaki Ishikawa	PA	2
Ferrari	(Switzerland) Spirit of Race (Italy) AF Corse (Italy) Kaspersky Motorsport (Russia) SMP Racing	488 GT3	52	(United Kingdom) Duncan Cameron	PA	2
Ferrari	(Switzerland) Spirit of Race (Italy) AF Corse (Italy) Kaspersky Motorsport (Russia) SMP Racing	488 GT3	52	(Republic of Ireland) Matt Griffin	PA	2
Ferrari	(Switzerland) Spirit of Race (Italy) AF Corse (Italy) Kaspersky Motorsport (Russia) SMP Racing	488 GT3	52	(Italy) Riccardo Ragazzi	PA	2
Ferrari	(Switzerland) Spirit of Race (Italy) AF Corse (Italy) Kaspersky Motorsport (Russia) SMP Racing	488 GT3	52	(United Kingdom) Aaron Scott	PA	2
Ferrari	(Switzerland) Spirit of Race (Italy) AF Corse (Italy) Kaspersky Motorsport (Russia) SMP Racing	488 GT3	53	(Italy) Andrea Bertolini	PA	2
Ferrari	(Switzerland) Spirit of Race (Italy) AF Corse (Italy) Kaspersky Motorsport (Russia) SMP Racing	488 GT3	53	(United Kingdom) Rory Butcher	PA	2
Ferrari	(Switzerland) Spirit of Race (Italy) AF Corse (Italy) Kaspersky Motorsport (Russia) SMP Racing	488 GT3	53	(Netherlands) Niek Hommerson	PA	2
Ferrari	(Switzerland) Spirit of Race (Italy) AF Corse (Italy) Kaspersky Motorsport (Russia) SMP Racing	488 GT3	53	(Belgium) Louis Machiels	PA	2
Ferrari	(Switzerland) Spirit of Race (Italy) AF Corse (Italy) Kaspersky Motorsport (Russia) SMP Racing	488 GT3	55	(United Kingdom) James Calado	P	2
Ferrari	(Switzerland) Spirit of Race (Italy) AF Corse (Italy) Kaspersky Motorsport (Russia) SMP Racing	488 GT3	55	(Italy) Marco Cioci	P	2
Ferrari	(Switzerland) Spirit of Race (Italy) AF Corse (Italy) Kaspersky Motorsport (Russia) SMP Racing	488 GT3	55	(Italy) Giancarlo Fisichella	P	2
Ferrari	(Switzerland) Spirit of Race (Italy) AF Corse (Italy) Kaspersky Motorsport (Russia) SMP Racing	488 GT3	72	(Spain) Miguel Molina	P	2
Ferrari	(Switzerland) Spirit of Race (Italy) AF Corse (Italy) Kaspersky Motorsport (Russia) SMP Racing	488 GT3	72	(Italy) Davide Rigon	P	2
Ferrari	(Switzerland) Spirit of Race (Italy) AF Corse (Italy) Kaspersky Motorsport (Russia) SMP Racing	488 GT3	72	(Russia) Viktor Shaytar	P	2
Ferrari	(Switzerland) Spirit of Race (Italy) AF Corse (Italy) Kaspersky Motorsport (Russia) SMP Racing	488 GT3	961	(Lebanon) Alex Demirdjian	PA	2
Ferrari	(Switzerland) Spirit of Race (Italy) AF Corse (Italy) Kaspersky Motorsport (Russia) SMP Racing	488 GT3	961	(France) Nicolas Minassian	PA	2
Ferrari	(Switzerland) Spirit of Race (Italy) AF Corse (Italy) Kaspersky Motorsport (Russia) SMP Racing	488 GT3	961	(Italy) Davide Rizzo	PA	2
Ferrari	(Switzerland) Spirit of Race (Italy) AF Corse (Italy) Kaspersky Motorsport (Russia) SMP Racing	488 GT3	961	(Finland) Toni Vilander	PA	2
Ferrari	(Australia) Maranello Motorsport	488 GT3	88	(Australia) Craig Lowndes	P	1
Ferrari	(Australia) Maranello Motorsport	488 GT3	88	(Finland) Toni Vilander	P	1
Ferrari	(Australia) Maranello Motorsport	488 GT3	88	(Australia) Jamie Whincup	P	1
Ferrari	(Germany) Rinaldi Racing	488 GT3	333	(Italy) Matteo Malucelli	PA	2
Ferrari	(Germany) Rinaldi Racing	488 GT3	333	(Germany) Alexander Mattschull	PA	2
Ferrari	(Germany) Rinaldi Racing	488 GT3	333	(Russia) Rinat Salikhov	PA	2
Ferrari	(Germany) Rinaldi Racing	488 GT3	333	(Austria) Norbert Siedler	PA	2
Ferrari	(Germany) Rinaldi Racing	488 GT3	488	(Germany) Pierre Ehret	Am	2
Ferrari	(Germany) Rinaldi Racing	488 GT3	488	(Belgium) Patrick Van Glabeke	Am	2
Ferrari	(Germany) Rinaldi Racing	488 GT3	488	(Italy) Gabriele Lancieri	Am	2
Ferrari	(Germany) Rinaldi Racing	488 GT3	488	(Italy) Rino Mastronardi	Am	2
Jaguar	(Switzerland) Emil Frey Jaguar Racing	Jaguar XK Emil Frey G3	14	(Spain) Albert Costa	P	2
Jaguar	(Switzerland) Emil Frey Jaguar Racing	Jaguar XK Emil Frey G3	14	(Switzerland) Lorenz Frey	P	2
Jaguar	(Switzerland) Emil Frey Jaguar Racing	Jaguar XK Emil Frey G3	14	(Monaco) Stéphane Ortelli	P	2
Jaguar	(Switzerland) Emil Frey Jaguar Racing	Jaguar XK Emil Frey G3	114	(Switzerland) Jonathan Hirschi	P	2
Jaguar	(Switzerland) Emil Frey Jaguar Racing	Jaguar XK Emil Frey G3	114	(Austria) Christian Klien	P	2
Jaguar	(Switzerland) Emil Frey Jaguar Racing	Jaguar XK Emil Frey G3	114	(Germany) Marco Seefried	P	2
Lamborghini	(Italy) Ombra Racing	Huracán GT3	12	(Italy) Michele Beretta	P	2
Lamborghini	(Italy) Ombra Racing	Huracán GT3	12	(Italy) Stefano Gattuso	P	2
Lamborghini	(Italy) Ombra Racing	Huracán GT3	12	(Italy) Andrea Piccini	P	2
Lamborghini	(Austria) GRT Grasser Racing Team	Huracán GT3	19	(Italy) Raffaele Giammaria	P	2
Lamborghini	(Austria) GRT Grasser Racing Team	Huracán GT3	19	(Switzerland) Rolf Ineichen	P	2
Lamborghini	(Austria) GRT Grasser Racing Team	Huracán GT3	19	(Argentina) Ezequiel Pérez Companc	P	2
Lamborghini	(Austria) GRT Grasser Racing Team	Huracán GT3	63	(Italy) Mirko Bortolotti	P	2
Lamborghini	(Austria) GRT Grasser Racing Team	Huracán GT3	63	(Italy) Andrea Caldarelli	P	2
Lamborghini	(Austria) GRT Grasser Racing Team	Huracán GT3	63	(Germany) Christian Engelhart	P	2
Lamborghini	(Italy) Orange 1 Team Lazarus	Huracán GT3	27	(Italy) Fabrizio Crestani	P	2
Lamborghini	(Italy) Orange 1 Team Lazarus	Huracán GT3	27	(Italy) Luca Filippi	P	2
Lamborghini	(Italy) Orange 1 Team Lazarus	Huracán GT3	27	(Germany) Nicolas Pohler	P	2
Lamborghini	(Australia) Trofeo Motorsport	Huracán GT3	29	(Australia) Dean Canto	Am	1
Lamborghini	(Australia) Trofeo Motorsport	Huracán GT3	29	(Italy) Ivan Capelli	Am	1
Lamborghini	(Australia) Trofeo Motorsport	Huracán GT3	29	(Australia) Jim Manolios	Am	1
Lamborghini	(Australia) Trofeo Motorsport	Huracán GT3	29	(Australia) Ryan Millier	Am	1
Lamborghini	(Germany) Attempto Racing	Huracán GT3	66	(Canada) Mikaël Grenier	P	2
Lamborghini	(Germany) Attempto Racing	Huracán GT3	66	(Netherlands) Jaap van Lagen	P	2
Lamborghini	(Germany) Attempto Racing	Huracán GT3	66	(Netherlands) Max van Splunteren	P	2
Lamborghini	(Germany) Attempto Racing	Huracán GT3	67	(Belgium) Sarah Bovy	Am	2
Lamborghini	(Germany) Attempto Racing	Huracán GT3	67	(Germany) Jürgen Krebs	Am	2
Lamborghini	(Germany) Attempto Racing	Huracán GT3	67	(Italy) Giorgio Maggi	Am	2
Lamborghini	(Germany) Attempto Racing	Huracán GT3	67	(France) Clément Mateu	Am	2
Lamborghini	(United Kingdom) Barwell Motorsport	Huracán GT3	77	(Switzerland) Adrian Amstutz	PA	2
Lamborghini	(United Kingdom) Barwell Motorsport	Huracán GT3	77	(United Kingdom) Oliver Gavin	PA	2
Lamborghini	(United Kingdom) Barwell Motorsport	Huracán GT3	77	(Croatia) Martin Kodrić	PA	2
Lamborghini	(United Kingdom) Barwell Motorsport	Huracán GT3	77	(Finland) Patrick Kujala	PA	2
Lamborghini	(United Kingdom) Barwell Motorsport	Huracán GT3	78	(United Kingdom) Richard Abra	PA	2
Lamborghini	(United Kingdom) Barwell Motorsport	Huracán GT3	78	(United Kingdom) Phil Keen	PA	2
Lamborghini	(United Kingdom) Barwell Motorsport	Huracán GT3	78	(Russia) Leo Machitski	PA	2
Lamborghini	(United Kingdom) Barwell Motorsport	Huracán GT3	78	(Portugal) Miguel Ramos	PA	2
Lamborghini	(Austria) Team HB Racing	Huracán GT3	777	(Belgium) Bernard Delhez	Am	2
Lamborghini	(Austria) Team HB Racing	Huracán GT3	777	(Germany) Mike Stursberg	Am	2
Lamborghini	(Austria) Team HB Racing	Huracán GT3	777	(France) Gilles Vannelet	Am	2
Lamborghini	(Austria) Team HB Racing	Huracán GT3	777	(Switzerland) Christopher Zanella	Am	2
McLaren	(Australia) Tekno Autosports/McLaren GT	650S GT3	1	(United Kingdom) Rob Bell	P	1
McLaren	(Australia) Tekno Autosports/McLaren GT	650S GT3	1	(France) Côme Ledogar	P	1
McLaren	(Australia) Tekno Autosports/McLaren GT	650S GT3	1	(Portugal) Álvaro Parente	P	1
McLaren	(Australia) Tekno Autosports/McLaren GT	650S GT3	59	(United Kingdom) Ben Barnicoat	P	1
McLaren	(Australia) Tekno Autosports/McLaren GT	650S GT3	59	(United Kingdom) Jonny Kane	P	1
McLaren	(Australia) Tekno Autosports/McLaren GT	650S GT3	59	(Australia) Will Davison	P	1
McLaren	(United States) K-PAX Racing	650S GT3	9	(United Kingdom) Ben Barnicoat	P	3
McLaren	(United States) K-PAX Racing	650S GT3	9	(Portugal) Álvaro Parente	P	3
McLaren	(United States) K-PAX Racing	650S GT3	9	(United States) Bryan Sellers	P	3
McLaren	(Australia) Objective Racing	650S GT3	11	(Australia) Alex Davison	PA	1
McLaren	(Australia) Objective Racing	650S GT3	11	(Australia) Warren Luff	PA	1
McLaren	(Australia) Objective Racing	650S GT3	11	(Australia) Tim Slade	PA	1
McLaren	(Australia) Objective Racing	650S GT3	11	(Australia) Tony Walls	PA	1
McLaren	(Australia) Keltic Racing	650S GT3	37	(Australia) Grant Denyer	Am	1
McLaren	(Australia) Keltic Racing	650S GT3	37	(Australia) Klark Quinn	Am	1
McLaren	(Australia) Keltic Racing	650S GT3	37	(United Kingdom) Tony Quinn	Am	1
McLaren	(Australia) Keltic Racing	650S GT3	37	(New Zealand) Andrew Waite	Am	1
McLaren	(United Kingdom) Strakka Racing	650S GT3	42	(United Kingdom) Craig Fleming	PA	2
McLaren	(United Kingdom) Strakka Racing	650S GT3	42	(United Kingdom) Nick Leventis	PA	2
McLaren	(United Kingdom) Strakka Racing	650S GT3	42	(United Kingdom) Oliver Webb	PA	2
McLaren	(United Kingdom) Strakka Racing	650S GT3	42	(United Kingdom) Lewis Williamson	PA	2
McLaren	(United Kingdom) Strakka Racing	650S GT3	43	(Italy) David Fumanelli	P	2
McLaren	(United Kingdom) Strakka Racing	650S GT3	43	(United Kingdom) Jonny Kane	P	2
McLaren	(United Kingdom) Strakka Racing	650S GT3	43	(United Kingdom) Sam Tordoff	P	2
McLaren	(United Kingdom) Strakka Racing	650S GT3	58	(United Kingdom) Ben Barnicoat	P	2
McLaren	(United Kingdom) Strakka Racing	650S GT3	58	(United Kingdom) Rob Bell	P	2
McLaren	(United Kingdom) Strakka Racing	650S GT3	58	(France) Côme Ledogar	P	2
McLaren	(United Kingdom) Strakka Racing	650S GT3	59	(Malaysia) Jazeman Jaafar	P	2
McLaren	(United Kingdom) Strakka Racing	650S GT3	59	(Netherlands) Pieter Schothorst	P	2
McLaren	(United Kingdom) Strakka Racing	650S GT3	59	(United Kingdom) Andrew Watson	P	2
McLaren	(United Kingdom) Garage 59	650S GT3	188	(United Kingdom) Bradley Ellis	Am	2
McLaren	(United Kingdom) Garage 59	650S GT3	188	(United Kingdom) Chris Goodwin	Am	2
McLaren	(United Kingdom) Garage 59	650S GT3	188	(United Kingdom) Chris Harris	Am	2
McLaren	(United Kingdom) Garage 59	650S GT3	188	(Sweden) Alexander West	Am	2
Mercedes-Benz	(Japan) Good Smile Racing with Team UKYO	AMG GT3	00	(Japan) Tatsuya Kataoka	P	2
Mercedes-Benz	(Japan) Good Smile Racing with Team UKYO	AMG GT3	00	(Japan) Kamui Kobayashi	P	2
Mercedes-Benz	(Japan) Good Smile Racing with Team UKYO	AMG GT3	00	(Japan) Nobuteru Taniguchi	P	2
Mercedes-Benz	(Germany) Black Falcon	AMG GT3	4	(Netherlands) Yelmer Buurman	P	2
Mercedes-Benz	(Germany) Black Falcon	AMG GT3	4	(United Kingdom) Adam Christodoulou	P	2
Mercedes-Benz	(Germany) Black Falcon	AMG GT3	4	(Germany) Luca Stolz	P	2
Mercedes-Benz	(Germany) Black Falcon	AMG GT3	15	(Netherlands) Jeroen Bleekemolen	PA	2
Mercedes-Benz	(Germany) Black Falcon	AMG GT3	15	(United States) Dore Chaponick Jr.	PA	2
Mercedes-Benz	(Germany) Black Falcon	AMG GT3	15	(United States) Scott Heckert	PA	2
Mercedes-Benz	(Germany) Black Falcon	AMG GT3	15	(United States) Brett Sandberg	PA	2
Mercedes-Benz	(Germany) Black Falcon	AMG GT3	16	(Germany) Maximilian Götz	PA	2
Mercedes-Benz	(Germany) Black Falcon	AMG GT3	16	(Germany) Marvin Kirchhöfer	PA	2
Mercedes-Benz	(Germany) Black Falcon	AMG GT3	16	(United Kingdom) Oliver Morley	PA	2
Mercedes-Benz	(Germany) Black Falcon	AMG GT3	16	(Spain) Miguel Toril	PA	2
Mercedes-Benz	(Germany) Black Falcon	AMG GT3	18	(Saudi Arabia) Abdulaziz Bin Turki Al Faisal	PA	2
Mercedes-Benz	(Germany) Black Falcon	AMG GT3	18	(Germany) Hubert Haupt	PA	2
Mercedes-Benz	(Germany) Black Falcon	AMG GT3	18	(Italy) Gabriele Piana	PA	2
Mercedes-Benz	(Germany) Black Falcon	AMG GT3	18	(Netherlands) Renger van der Zande	PA	2
Mercedes-Benz	(Australia) Mercedes-AMG Team STM/HTP Motorsport (Note: Car No. 22 entered as Mercedes-AMG Team STM/HTP Motorsport under Australian licence, and car No. 48 entered as MANN-FILTER Team HTP Motorsport, cars No. 83 and 85 entered as HTP Motorsport and car No. 84 entered as Mercedes-AMG Team HTP Motorsport under German licence.) (Germany) MANN-FILTER Team HTP Motorsport (Germany) HTP Motorsport (Germany) Mercedes-AMG Team HTP Motorsport	AMG GT3	22	(New Zealand) Craig Baird	P	1
Mercedes-Benz	(Australia) Mercedes-AMG Team STM/HTP Motorsport (Germany) MANN-FILTER Team HTP Motorsport (Germany) HTP Motorsport (Germany) Mercedes-AMG Team HTP Motorsport	AMG GT3	22	(Germany) Maro Engel	P	1
Mercedes-Benz	(Australia) Mercedes-AMG Team STM/HTP Motorsport (Germany) MANN-FILTER Team HTP Motorsport (Germany) HTP Motorsport (Germany) Mercedes-AMG Team HTP Motorsport	AMG GT3	22	(New Zealand) Shane van Gisbergen	P	1
Mercedes-Benz	(Australia) Mercedes-AMG Team STM/HTP Motorsport (Germany) MANN-FILTER Team HTP Motorsport (Germany) HTP Motorsport (Germany) Mercedes-AMG Team HTP Motorsport	AMG GT3	48	(Germany) Patrick Assenheimer	P	2
Mercedes-Benz	(Australia) Mercedes-AMG Team STM/HTP Motorsport (Germany) MANN-FILTER Team HTP Motorsport (Germany) HTP Motorsport (Germany) Mercedes-AMG Team HTP Motorsport	AMG GT3	48	(Netherlands) Indy Dontje	P	2
Mercedes-Benz	(Australia) Mercedes-AMG Team STM/HTP Motorsport (Germany) MANN-FILTER Team HTP Motorsport (Germany) HTP Motorsport (Germany) Mercedes-AMG Team HTP Motorsport	AMG GT3	48	(Germany) Kenneth Heyer	P	2
Mercedes-Benz	(Australia) Mercedes-AMG Team STM/HTP Motorsport (Germany) MANN-FILTER Team HTP Motorsport (Germany) HTP Motorsport (Germany) Mercedes-AMG Team HTP Motorsport	AMG GT3	83	(Canada) Paul Dalla Lana	PA	1
Mercedes-Benz	(Australia) Mercedes-AMG Team STM/HTP Motorsport (Germany) MANN-FILTER Team HTP Motorsport (Germany) HTP Motorsport (Germany) Mercedes-AMG Team HTP Motorsport	AMG GT3	83	(Portugal) Pedro Lamy	PA	1
Mercedes-Benz	(Australia) Mercedes-AMG Team STM/HTP Motorsport (Germany) MANN-FILTER Team HTP Motorsport (Germany) HTP Motorsport (Germany) Mercedes-AMG Team HTP Motorsport	AMG GT3	83	(Austria) Mathias Lauda	PA	1
Mercedes-Benz	(Australia) Mercedes-AMG Team STM/HTP Motorsport (Germany) MANN-FILTER Team HTP Motorsport (Germany) HTP Motorsport (Germany) Mercedes-AMG Team HTP Motorsport	AMG GT3	83	(Germany) Bernd Schneider	PA	1
Mercedes-Benz	(Australia) Mercedes-AMG Team STM/HTP Motorsport (Germany) MANN-FILTER Team HTP Motorsport (Germany) HTP Motorsport (Germany) Mercedes-AMG Team HTP Motorsport	AMG GT3	84	(Germany) Maximilian Buhk	P	2
Mercedes-Benz	(Australia) Mercedes-AMG Team STM/HTP Motorsport (Germany) MANN-FILTER Team HTP Motorsport (Germany) HTP Motorsport (Germany) Mercedes-AMG Team HTP Motorsport	AMG GT3	84	(Sweden) Jimmy Eriksson	P	2
Mercedes-Benz	(Australia) Mercedes-AMG Team STM/HTP Motorsport (Germany) MANN-FILTER Team HTP Motorsport (Germany) HTP Motorsport (Germany) Mercedes-AMG Team HTP Motorsport	AMG GT3	84	(France) Franck Perera	P	2
Mercedes-Benz	(Australia) Mercedes-AMG Team STM/HTP Motorsport (Germany) MANN-FILTER Team HTP Motorsport (Germany) HTP Motorsport (Germany) Mercedes-AMG Team HTP Motorsport	AMG GT3	85	(Austria) Dominik Baumann	P	2
Mercedes-Benz	(Australia) Mercedes-AMG Team STM/HTP Motorsport (Germany) MANN-FILTER Team HTP Motorsport (Germany) HTP Motorsport (Germany) Mercedes-AMG Team HTP Motorsport	AMG GT3	85	(Sweden) Edward Sandström	P	2
Mercedes-Benz	(Australia) Mercedes-AMG Team STM/HTP Motorsport (Germany) MANN-FILTER Team HTP Motorsport (Germany) HTP Motorsport (Germany) Mercedes-AMG Team HTP Motorsport	AMG GT3	85	(Germany) Fabian Schiller	P	2
Mercedes-Benz	(Australia) Hog's	AMG GT3	61	(Australia) Mark Griffith	PA	1
Mercedes-Benz	(Australia) Hog's	AMG GT3	61	(Australia) David Reynolds	PA	1
Mercedes-Benz	(Australia) Hog's	AMG GT3	61	(New Zealand) Dominic Storey	PA	1
Mercedes-Benz	(France) / Mercedes-AMG Team AKKA ASP (Note: Car No. 88 entered as Mercedes-AMG Team AKKA ASP. Cars No. 89 and 90 entered as AKKA ASP.); (France) / AKKA ASP	AMG GT3	88	(Spain) Daniel Juncadella	P	2
Mercedes-Benz	(France) / Mercedes-AMG Team AKKA ASP; (France) / AKKA ASP	AMG GT3	88	(Puerto Rico) Félix Serrallés	P	2
Mercedes-Benz	(France) / Mercedes-AMG Team AKKA ASP; (France) / AKKA ASP	AMG GT3	88	(France) Tristan Vautier	P	2
Mercedes-Benz	(France) / Mercedes-AMG Team AKKA ASP; (France) / AKKA ASP	AMG GT3	89	(France) Ludovic Badey	PA	2
Mercedes-Benz	(France) / Mercedes-AMG Team AKKA ASP; (France) / AKKA ASP	AMG GT3	89	(Germany) Nico Bastian	PA	2
Mercedes-Benz	(France) / Mercedes-AMG Team AKKA ASP; (France) / AKKA ASP	AMG GT3	89	(Switzerland) Alex Fontana	PA	2
Mercedes-Benz	(France) / Mercedes-AMG Team AKKA ASP; (France) / AKKA ASP	AMG GT3	89	(Switzerland) Daniele Perfetti	PA	2
Mercedes-Benz	(France) / Mercedes-AMG Team AKKA ASP; (France) / AKKA ASP	AMG GT3	90	(Italy) Raffaele Marciello	P	2
Mercedes-Benz	(France) / Mercedes-AMG Team AKKA ASP; (France) / AKKA ASP	AMG GT3	90	(United Kingdom) Michael Meadows	P	2
Mercedes-Benz	(France) / Mercedes-AMG Team AKKA ASP; (France) / AKKA ASP	AMG GT3	90	(Italy) Edoardo Mortara	P	2
Nissan	(United Kingdom) / Motul Team RJN Motorsport (Note: Car No. 22 entered as Motul Team RJN Motorsport and car No. 23 entered as Motul Team RJN Nissan.); (United Kingdom) / Motul Team RJN Nissan	GT-R Nismo GT3	22	(United Kingdom) Struan Moore	P	2
Nissan	(United Kingdom) / Motul Team RJN Motorsport; (United Kingdom) / Motul Team RJN Nissan	GT-R Nismo GT3	22	(United Kingdom) Matt Parry	P	2
Nissan	(United Kingdom) / Motul Team RJN Motorsport; (United Kingdom) / Motul Team RJN Nissan	GT-R Nismo GT3	22	(Australia) Matt Simmons	P	2
Nissan	(United Kingdom) / Motul Team RJN Motorsport; (United Kingdom) / Motul Team RJN Nissan	GT-R Nismo GT3	23	(United Kingdom) Alex Buncombe	P	2
Nissan	(United Kingdom) / Motul Team RJN Motorsport; (United Kingdom) / Motul Team RJN Nissan	GT-R Nismo GT3	23	(Japan) Katsumasa Chiyo	P	2
Nissan	(United Kingdom) / Motul Team RJN Motorsport; (United Kingdom) / Motul Team RJN Nissan	GT-R Nismo GT3	23	(Spain) Lucas Ordóñez	P	2
Nissan	(Australia) Nissan Motorsport	GT-R Nismo GT3	23	(United Kingdom) Alex Buncombe	P	1
Nissan	(Australia) Nissan Motorsport	GT-R Nismo GT3	23	(Australia) Michael Caruso	P	1
Nissan	(Australia) Nissan Motorsport	GT-R Nismo GT3	23	(Japan) Katsumasa Chiyo	P	1
Nissan	(Australia) Nissan Motorsport	GT-R Nismo GT3	24	(Australia) Todd Kelly	P	1
Nissan	(Australia) Nissan Motorsport	GT-R Nismo GT3	24	(United Kingdom) Jann Mardenborough	P	1
Nissan	(Australia) Nissan Motorsport	GT-R Nismo GT3	24	(Germany) Florian Strauss	P	1
Nissan	(Australia) Wall Racing	GT-R Nismo GT3	38	(Hong Kong) Daniel Bilski	Am	1
Nissan	(Australia) Wall Racing	GT-R Nismo GT3	38	(Australia) Adrian Flack	Am	1
Nissan	(Australia) Wall Racing	GT-R Nismo GT3	38	(New Zealand) Chris Pither	Am	1
Nissan	(Australia) Wall Racing	GT-R Nismo GT3	66	(United States) Erik Davis	Am	1
Nissan	(Australia) Wall Racing	GT-R Nismo GT3	66	(Australia) Brett Hobson	Am	1
Nissan	(Australia) Wall Racing	GT-R Nismo GT3	66	(United States) Fred Poordad	Am	1
Porsche	(United States) Competition Motorsports	911 GT3 R	12	(Australia) David Calvert-Jones	PA	1
Porsche	(United States) Competition Motorsports	911 GT3 R	12	(Australia) Matt Campbell	PA	1
Porsche	(United States) Competition Motorsports	911 GT3 R	12	(Germany) Marc Lieb	PA	1
Porsche	(United States) Competition Motorsports	911 GT3 R	12	(United States) Patrick Long	PA	1
Porsche	(United States) / GMG Racing (Note: Car No. 17 entered as GMG Racing and car No. 77 entered as Calvert Dynamics / GMG Racing.); (United States) / Calvert Dynamics / GMG Racing	911 GT3 R	17	(Germany) Wolf Henzler	P	3
Porsche	(United States) / GMG Racing; (United States) / Calvert Dynamics / GMG Racing	911 GT3 R	17	(Germany) Sven Müller	P	3
Porsche	(United States) / GMG Racing; (United States) / Calvert Dynamics / GMG Racing	911 GT3 R	17	(United States) Alec Udell	P	3
Porsche	(United States) / GMG Racing; (United States) / Calvert Dynamics / GMG Racing	911 GT3 R	77	(United States) Preston Calvert	PA	3
Porsche	(United States) / GMG Racing; (United States) / Calvert Dynamics / GMG Racing	911 GT3 R	77	(United States) Andrew Davis	PA	3
Porsche	(United States) / GMG Racing; (United States) / Calvert Dynamics / GMG Racing	911 GT3 R	77	(United States) Michael Lewis	PA	3
Porsche	(Australia) AMAC Motorsport	997 GT3 R	51	(Australia) Andrew Macpherson	Am	1
Porsche	(Australia) AMAC Motorsport	997 GT3 R	51	(Australia) Tim Miles	Am	1
Porsche	(Australia) AMAC Motorsport	997 GT3 R	51	(Australia) Neale Muston	Am	1
Porsche	(United States) Black Swan Racing	911 GT3 R	54	(Netherlands) Jeroen Bleekemolen	PA	3
Porsche	(United States) Black Swan Racing	911 GT3 R	54	(Australia) David Calvert-Jones	PA	3
Porsche	(United States) Black Swan Racing	911 GT3 R	54	(United States) Tim Pappas	PA	3
Porsche	(United States) Porsche Motorsport North America by Wright Motorsports	911 GT3 R	58	(Germany) Jörg Bergmeister	P	3
Porsche	(United States) Porsche Motorsport North America by Wright Motorsports	911 GT3 R	58	(France) Romain Dumas	P	3
Porsche	(United States) Porsche Motorsport North America by Wright Motorsports	911 GT3 R	58	(United States) Patrick Long	P	3
Porsche	(Germany) KÜS TEAM75 Bernhard	911 GT3 R	117	(Denmark) Michael Christensen	P	2
Porsche	(Germany) KÜS TEAM75 Bernhard	911 GT3 R	117	(France) Kévin Estre	P	2
Porsche	(Germany) KÜS TEAM75 Bernhard	911 GT3 R	117	(Belgium) Laurens Vanthoor	P	2
Porsche	(Germany) Herberth Motorsport	911 GT3 R	911	(Germany) Jürgen Häring	PA	2
Porsche	(Germany) Herberth Motorsport	911 GT3 R	911	(Germany) Marc Lieb	PA	2
Porsche	(Germany) Herberth Motorsport	911 GT3 R	911	(Germany) Alfred Renauer	PA	2
Porsche	(Germany) Herberth Motorsport	911 GT3 R	911	(Germany) Robert Renauer	PA	2
Porsche	(Germany) Herberth Motorsport	911 GT3 R	912	(Switzerland) Daniel Allemann	PA	2
Porsche	(Germany) Herberth Motorsport	911 GT3 R	912	(Germany) Ralf Bohn	PA	2
Porsche	(Germany) Herberth Motorsport	911 GT3 R	912	(France) Mathieu Jaminet	PA	2
Porsche	(Germany) Herberth Motorsport	911 GT3 R	912	(Germany) Sven Müller	PA	2
Porsche	(Australia) Walkinshaw GT3	911 GT3 R	911	(New Zealand) Earl Bamber	P	1
Porsche	(Australia) Walkinshaw GT3	911 GT3 R	911	(France) Kévin Estre	P	1
Porsche	(Australia) Walkinshaw GT3	911 GT3 R	911	(Belgium) Laurens Vanthoor	P	1
Porsche	(Australia) Walkinshaw GT3	911 GT3 R	912	(Australia) John Martin	Am	1
Porsche	(Australia) Walkinshaw GT3	911 GT3 R	912	(Australia) Duvashen Padayachee	Am	1
Porsche	(Australia) Walkinshaw GT3	911 GT3 R	912	(Australia) Liam Talbot	Am	1
Reiter Engineering	(Australia) Lago Racing	Gallardo R-EX	32	(Australia) Roger Lago	Am	1
Reiter Engineering	(Australia) Lago Racing	Gallardo R-EX	32	(Australia) Steve Owen	Am	1
Reiter Engineering	(Australia) Lago Racing	Gallardo R-EX	32	(Australia) David Russell	Am	1
Reiter Engineering	(New Zealand) Kiwi Racing	Gallardo R-EX	47	(New Zealand) Kevin Bell	Am	1
Reiter Engineering	(New Zealand) Kiwi Racing	Gallardo R-EX	47	(New Zealand) Nick Chester	Am	1
Reiter Engineering	(New Zealand) Kiwi Racing	Gallardo R-EX	47	(New Zealand) Glenn Smith	Am	1
Reiter Engineering	(New Zealand) Kiwi Racing	Gallardo R-EX	47	(New Zealand) John De Veth	Am	1

Icon	Class
P	Pro Cup
PA	Pro-Am Cup
Am	Am Cup

=== GT4 ===
Manufacturer	Team	Car	No.	Drivers	Rounds
Aston Martin	(United States) TRG	Vantage GT4	07	(United States) Michael Davis	3
Aston Martin	(United States) TRG	Vantage GT4	07	(United States) Derek DeBoer	3
Aston Martin	(United States) TRG	Vantage GT4	07	(United States) Greg Milzcik	3
Aston Martin	(United States) TRG	Vantage GT4	3	(United States) Craig Lyons	3
Aston Martin	(United States) TRG	Vantage GT4	3	(United States) Thomas Merrill	3
Aston Martin	(United States) TRG	Vantage GT4	3	(United States) Kris Wilson	3
Aston Martin	(Switzerland) R-Motorsport	Vantage GT4	62	(Switzerland) Andreas Baenziger	1
Aston Martin	(Switzerland) R-Motorsport	Vantage GT4	62	(Australia) Peter Leemhuis	1
Aston Martin	(Switzerland) R-Motorsport	Vantage GT4	62	(Denmark) Jan Struve	1
Aston Martin	(United States) Automatic Racing	Vantage GT4	99	(United States) Charles Espenlaub	3
Aston Martin	(United States) Automatic Racing	Vantage GT4	99	(United States) Eric Lux	3
Aston Martin	(United States) Automatic Racing	Vantage GT4	99	(United States) Charlie Putman	3
Ginetta	(United States) Ian Lacy Racing	G55 GT4	12	(United States) Frank Gannett	3
Ginetta	(United States) Ian Lacy Racing	G55 GT4	12	(United States) Ian Lacy	3
Ginetta	(United States) Ian Lacy Racing	G55 GT4	12	(United States) Drew Staveley	3
Ginetta	(Australia) RA Motorsports - Ginetta	G55 GT4	55	(Australia) Tim Berryman	1
Ginetta	(Australia) RA Motorsports - Ginetta	G55 GT4	55	(Australia) Peter Paddon	1
Ginetta	(Australia) RA Motorsports - Ginetta	G55 GT4	55	(United Kingdom) Mike Simpson	1
Ginetta	(Australia) RA Motorsports - Ginetta	G55 GT4	69	(Malaysia) Zen Low	1
Ginetta	(Australia) RA Motorsports - Ginetta	G55 GT4	69	(Australia) Jake Parsons	1
Ginetta	(Australia) RA Motorsports - Ginetta	G55 GT4	69	(Australia) Aidan Read	1
Ginetta	(Australia) RA Motorsports - Ginetta	G55 GT4	69	(Japan) Shinyo Sano	1
KTM	(Australia) M Motorsport	X-Bow GT4	48	(Czech Republic) Tomáš Enge	1
KTM	(Australia) M Motorsport	X-Bow GT4	48	(Austria) Reinhard Kofler	1
KTM	(Australia) M Motorsport	X-Bow GT4	48	(Australia) Justin McMillan	1
KTM	(Australia) M Motorsport	X-Bow GT4	48	(Australia) Glen Wood	1
Porsche	(United States) HKG Racing / GMG Racing	Cayman GT4 Clubsport	8	(United States) Andy Lee	3
Porsche	(United States) HKG Racing / GMG Racing	Cayman GT4 Clubsport	8	(United States) Jon Miller	3
Porsche	(United States) HKG Racing / GMG Racing	Cayman GT4 Clubsport	8	(United States) Carter Yeung	3
Porsche	(United States) Rearden Racing	Cayman GT4 Clubsport MR	26	(United States) Jeff Kearl	3
Porsche	(United States) Rearden Racing	Cayman GT4 Clubsport MR	26	(United States) Sean McAlister	3
Porsche	(United States) Rearden Racing	Cayman GT4 Clubsport MR	26	(United States) Jeff Westphal	3
Porsche	(United States) Rearden Racing	Cayman GT4 Clubsport MR	117	(United States) Daren Jorgensen	3
Porsche	(United States) Rearden Racing	Cayman GT4 Clubsport MR	117	(Bulgaria) Vesko Kozarov	3
Porsche	(United States) Rearden Racing	Cayman GT4 Clubsport MR	117	(United States) Hutton McKenna	3
Porsche	(United Kingdom) Brookspeed	Cayman GT4 Clubsport	40	(United Kingdom) David Drinkwater	1
Porsche	(United Kingdom) Brookspeed	Cayman GT4 Clubsport	40	(United Kingdom) Aaron Mason	1
Porsche	(United Kingdom) Brookspeed	Cayman GT4 Clubsport	40	(United Kingdom) Adrian Watt	1
Porsche	(United Kingdom) Brookspeed	Cayman GT4 Clubsport	41	(Australia) Coleby Cowham	1
Porsche	(United Kingdom) Brookspeed	Cayman GT4 Clubsport	41	(Australia) Ashley Jarvis	1
Porsche	(United Kingdom) Brookspeed	Cayman GT4 Clubsport	41	(Australia) Lindsay Kearns	1
PROsport Porsche	(Germany) PROsport Performance	Cayman PRO4 GT4	18	(United States) Charles Espenlaub	1
PROsport Porsche	(Germany) PROsport Performance	Cayman PRO4 GT4	18	(United States) Joe Foster	1
PROsport Porsche	(Germany) PROsport Performance	Cayman PRO4 GT4	18	(United States) Andy Pilgrim	1
PROsport Porsche	(Germany) PROsport Performance	Cayman PRO4 GT4	18	(United States) Charles Putman	1
PROsport Porsche	(Germany) PROsport Performance	Cayman PRO4 GT4	19	(Netherlands) Max Braams	1
PROsport Porsche	(Germany) PROsport Performance	Cayman PRO4 GT4	19	(Australia) Harri Jones	1
PROsport Porsche	(Germany) PROsport Performance	Cayman PRO4 GT4	19	(Denmark) Nicolaj Møller Madsen	1
PROsport Porsche	(Germany) PROsport Performance	Cayman PRO4 GT4	19	(Germany) Jörg Viebahn	1

== Race results ==
Rnd.	Circuit	Pole Position	GT3 Winners	GT4 Winners	Winning Manufacturers	
Rnd.	Circuit	Pole Position	GT3 Winners	GT4 Winners	GT3	GT4
1	(Australia) Bathurst	(Australia) No. 88 Maranello Motorsport	(Australia) No. 88 Maranello Motorsport	(Germany) No. 19 PROsport Performance	Ferrari	PROsport Porsche
1	(Australia) Bathurst	(Australia) Craig Lowndes (Finland) Toni Vilander (Australia) Jamie Whincup	(Australia) Craig Lowndes (Finland) Toni Vilander (Australia) Jamie Whincup	(Netherlands) Max Braams (Australia) Harri Jones (Denmark) Nicolaj Møller Madsen (Germany) Jörg Viebahn	Ferrari	PROsport Porsche
2	(Belgium) Spa-Francorchamps	(Italy) No. 55 Kaspersky Motorsport	(France) No. 25 Audi Sport Team Saintéloc	did not participate	Audi	did not participate
2	(Belgium) Spa-Francorchamps	(United Kingdom) James Calado (Italy) Marco Cioci (Italy) Giancarlo Fisichella	(France) Jules Gounon (Germany) Christopher Haase (Germany) Markus Winkelhock	did not participate	Audi	did not participate
3	(United States) Laguna Seca	(Germany) No. 29 Audi Sport Team Land	(United States) No. 44 Audi Sport Team Magnus	(United States) No. 26 Rearden Racing	Audi	Porsche
3	(United States) Laguna Seca	(Germany) Christopher Haase (Germany) Christopher Mies (United States) Connor De Phillippi	(Germany) Pierre Kaffer (South Africa) Kelvin van der Linde (Germany) Markus Winkelhock	(United States) Jeff Kearl (United States) Sean McAlister (United States) Jeff Westphal	Audi	Porsche

== Championship standings ==
Scoring system

Championship points were awarded for the first ten positions in each race. Entries were required to complete 75% of the winning car's race distance in order to be classified and earn points, with the exception of Bathurst where a car simply had to cross the finish line to be classified. Individual drivers were required to participate for a minimum of 25 minutes in order to earn championship points in any race. A manufacturer only received points for its two highest placed cars in each round.

Position	**1st**	**2nd**	**3rd**	**4th**	**5th**	**6th**	**7th**	**8th**	**9th**	**10th**
Points	25	18	15	12	10	8	6	4	2	1

=== Drivers' championship ===
The results indicate the classification relative to other drivers in the series, not the classification in the race. For unknown reasons some drivers were ineligible to score points. It is unknown which drivers that did not finish in a points scoring position were ineligible to score points.

Pos.	Driver	Manufacturer	BAT (Australia)	SPA (Belgium)	LGA (United States)	Points
1	(Germany) Markus Winkelhock	Audi	Ret	1	1	50
2	(Germany) Christopher Haase	Audi	13	1	**2**	44
3	(Germany) Christopher Mies	Audi	13	5	**2**	29
4	(Australia) David Calvert-Jones	Porsche	2		5	28
4	(United States) Connor De Phillippi	Audi		5	**2**	28
5	(Germany) Pierre Kaffer (South Africa) Kelvin van der Linde	Audi		9	1	27
5	(Portugal) Álvaro Parente	McLaren	5		3	27
6	(Finland) Toni Vilander	Ferrari	**1**	17		25
6	(Australia) Craig Lowndes (Australia) Jamie Whincup	Ferrari	**1**			25
6	(France) Jules Gounon	Audi		1		25
6	(France) Jules Gounon	Acura			Ret^{1}	25
7	(Monaco) Vincent Abril (Spain) Andy Soucek (Belgium) Maxime Soulet	Bentley	12	2		20
8	(United States) Patrick Long	Porsche	2		14	18
8	(Germany) Marc Lieb	Porsche	2	Ret		18
9	(United Kingdom) Oliver Jarvis (United Kingdom) Steven Kane (United Kingdom) Guy Smith	Bentley	3	14		15
9	(United Kingdom) Ben Barnicoat	McLaren	DNS	Ret	3	15
9	(Italy) Raffaele Marciello (United Kingdom) Michael Meadows (Italy) Edoardo Mortara	Mercedes-Benz		3		15
9	(United States) Bryan Sellers	McLaren		3		15
10	(United Kingdom) Rob Bell (France) Côme Ledogar	McLaren	5	Ret		12
10	(France) Kévin Estre (Belgium) Laurens Vanthoor	Porsche	Ret	4		12
10	(Denmark) Michael Christensen	Porsche		4		12
10	(United States) Dane Cameron (United States) Tom Dyer (United States) Ryan Eversley	Acura			4	12
11	(Australia) Roger Lago (Australia) Steve Owen (Australia) David Russell	Reiter Engineering	6			10
11	(Belgium) Frédéric Vervisch	Audi		5		10
11	(Netherlands) Jeroen Bleekemolen	Mercedes-Benz		Ret^{2}		10
11	(Netherlands) Jeroen Bleekemolen	Porsche			5	10
12	(Netherlands) Robin Frijns	Audi	Ret		6	8
12	(United Kingdom) Jake Dennis (United Kingdom) Stuart Leonard	Audi		Ret	6	8
12	(New Zealand) Matt Halliday (Australia) Ash Samadi	Audi	7			8
12	(Spain) Antonio García (Switzerland) Nico Müller (Germany) René Rast	Audi		6		8
13	(Germany) Sven Müller	Porsche		29	7	6
13	(Australia) Todd Kelly (United Kingdom) Jann Mardenborough (Germany) Florian Strauss	Nissan	8			6
13	(Austria) Dominik Baumann (Sweden) Edward Sandström (Germany) Fabian Schiller	Mercedes-Benz		7		6
13	(Germany) Wolf Henzler (United States) Alec Udell	Porsche			7	6
14	(Italy) Ivan Capelli (Australia) Jim Manolios (Australia) Ryan Millier	Lamborghini	10			4
14	(Netherlands) Yelmer Buurman (United Kingdom) Adam Christodoulou (Germany) Luca Stolz	Mercedes-Benz		8		4
14	(United States) Preston Calvert (United States) Andrew Davis (United States) Michael Lewis	Porsche			8	4
15	(Germany) Frank Stippler	Audi	Ret	9		2
15	(United States) Jeff Kearl (United States) Sean McAlister (United States) Jeff Westphal	Porsche			9	2
16	(Australia) Garth Tander	Audi	13			1
16	(United Kingdom) Tom Blomqvist (Netherlands) Nick Catsburg (Canada) Bruno Spengler	BMW		10		1
16	(United States) Jon Miller (United States) Carter Yeung	Porsche			10	1
	(Switzerland) Marcel Fässler (Germany) André Lotterer (Belgium) Dries Vanthoor	Audi		11		0
	(United States) Craig Lyons (United States) Thomas Merrill (United States) Kris Wilson	Aston Martin			11	0
	(Germany) Maximilian Götz (Germany) Marvin Kirchhöfer (United Kingdom) Oliver Morley (Spain) Miguel Toril	Mercedes-Benz		12		0
	(United States) Daren Jorgensen (Bulgaria) Vesko Kozarov (United States) Hutton McKenna	Porsche			12	0
	(United Kingdom) Alex Buncombe (Japan) Katsumasa Chiyo	Nissan	21	13		0
	(Spain) Lucas Ordóñez	Nissan		13		0
	(United States) Michael Davis (United States) Derek DeBoer (United States) Greg Milzcik	Aston Martin			13	0
	(New Zealand) Steve Richards (Australia) Mark Winterbottom (Germany) Marco Wittmann	BMW	14			0
	(Germany) Jörg Bergmeister (France) Romain Dumas	Porsche			14	0
	(Australia) Alex Davison (Australia) Warren Luff (Australia) Tim Slade (Australia) Tony Walls	McLaren	15			0
	(United Kingdom) Jonathan Adam (United Kingdom) Euan Hankey (Oman) Ahmad Al Harthy (Turkey) Salih Yoluç	Aston Martin		15		0
	(Netherlands) Max Braams (Australia) Harri Jones (Denmark) Nicolaj Møller Madsen (Germany) Jörg Viebahn	PROsport Porsche	16			0
	(Italy) Michele Beretta (Italy) Stefano Gattuso (Italy) Andrea Piccini	Lamborghini		16		0
	(United Kingdom) David Drinkwater (United Kingdom) Aaron Mason (United Kingdom) Adrian Watt	Porsche	17			0
	(Lebanon) Alex Demirdjian (France) Nicolas Minassian (Italy) Davide Rizzo	Ferrari		17		0
	(Australia) Coleby Cowham (Australia) Ashley Jarvis (Australia) Lindsay Kearns	Porsche	18			0
	(Italy) Raffaele Giammaria (Switzerland) Rolf Ineichen (Argentina) Ezequiel Pérez Companc	Lamborghini		18		0
	(Malaysia) Zen Low (Australia) Jake Parsons (Australia) Aidan Read (Japan) Shinyo Sano	Ginetta	19			0
	(Monaco) Olivier Beretta (Italy) Lorenzo Bontempelli (Monaco) Francesco Castellacci (Japan) Motoaki Ishikawa	Ferrari		19		0
	(Germany) Nico Menzel	BMW	DNS	20		0
	(Hong Kong) Daniel Bilski (Australia) Adrian Flack (New Zealand) Chris Pither	Nissan	20			0
	(Finland) Matias Henkola (Norway) Christian Krognes (Finland) Markus Palttala	BMW		20		0
	(Australia) Michael Caruso	Nissan	21			0
	(Italy) Fabrizio Crestani (Italy) Luca Filippi (Germany) Nicolas Pohler	Lamborghini		21		0
	(Italy) Niki Cadei (Belgium) Jacques Duyver (South Africa) David Perel (Italy) Marco Zanuttini	Ferrari		22		0
	(United Kingdom) Duncan Cameron (Republic of Ireland) Matt Griffin (Italy) Riccardo Ragazzi (United Kingdom) Aaron Scott	Ferrari		23		0
	(Spain) Miguel Molina (Italy) Davide Rigon (Russia) Viktor Shaytar	Ferrari		24		0
	(Germany) Pierre Ehret (Belgium) Patrick Van Glabeke (Italy) Gabriele Lancieri (Italy) Rino Mastronardi	Ferrari		25		0
	(Belgium) Stef Van Campenhout (Germany) Ralf Oeverhaus (Germany) David Schiwietz (Germany) Henry Walkenhorst	BMW		26		0
	(Belgium) Frédéric Bouvy (Belgium) Christian Kelders (France) Marc Rostan	Audi		27		0
	(Belgium) Bernard Delhez (Germany) Mike Stursberg (France) Gilles Vannelet (Switzerland) Christopher Zanella	Lamborghini		28		0
	(Switzerland) Daniel Allemann (Germany) Ralf Bohn (France) Mathieu Jaminet	Porsche		29		0
	(United Kingdom) Struan Moore (United Kingdom) Matt Parry (Australia) Matt Simmons	Nissan		30		0
	(Belgium) Sarah Bovy (Germany) Jürgen Krebs (Italy) Giorgio Maggi (France) Clément Mateu	Lamborghini		31		0
	(United Kingdom) Bradley Ellis (United Kingdom) Chris Goodwin (United Kingdom) Chris Harris (Sweden) Alexander West	McLaren		32		0
	(Austria) Philipp Eng (Belgium) Maxime Martin (United Kingdom) Alexander Sims	BMW		33		0
	(Canada) Mikaël Grenier (Netherlands) Jaap van Lagen (Netherlands) Max van Splunteren	Lamborghini		34		0
	(United Kingdom) Jonny Kane	McLaren	DNS	Ret		
	(New Zealand) Craig Baird (Germany) Maro Engel (New Zealand) Shane van Gisbergen	Mercedes-Benz	Ret			
	(Australia) James Bergmuller (New Zealand) Samuel Fillmore (Australia) Daniel Stutterd	Audi	Ret			
	(Canada) Paul Dalla Lana (Portugal) Pedro Lamy (Austria) Mathias Lauda (Germany) Bernd Schneider	Mercedes-Benz	Ret			
	(Czech Republic) Tomáš Enge (Austria) Reinhard Kofler (Australia) Justin McMillan (Australia) Glen Wood	KTM	Ret			
	(Australia) Andrew Macpherson (Australia) Tim Miles (Australia) Neale Muston	Porsche	Ret			
	(United States) Erik Davis (Australia) Brett Hobson (United States) Fred Poordad	Nissan	Ret			
	(Australia) Tim Berryman (Australia) Peter Paddon (United Kingdom) Mike Simpson	Ginetta	Ret			
	(Australia) Nathan Antunes (Australia) Elliot Barbour (Australia) Greg Taylor	Audi	Ret			
	(Australia) Mark Griffith (Australia) David Reynolds (New Zealand) Dominic Storey	Mercedes-Benz	Ret			
	(Australia) Morgan Haber (Australia) Chaz Mostert (Australia) Max Twigg	BMW	Ret			
	(Germany) Timo Glock (Australia) Russell Ingall (Australia) Tony Longhurst (Australia) Mark Skaife	BMW	Ret			
	(New Zealand) Kevin Bell (New Zealand) Nick Chester (New Zealand) Glenn Smith (New Zealand) John De Veth	Reiter Engineering	Ret			
	(Australia) Grant Denyer (Australia) Klark Quinn (United Kingdom) Tony Quinn (New Zealand) Andrew Waite	McLaren	Ret			
	(Australia) Tony Bates (Australia) George Miedecke (Australia) Ashley Walsh	Aston Martin	Ret			
	(New Zealand) Earl Bamber	Porsche	Ret			
	(France) Nathanaël Berthon (Monaco) Stéphane Richelmi (France) Benoît Tréluyer	Audi		Ret		
	(Malaysia) Jazeman Jaafar (Netherlands) Pieter Schothorst (United Kingdom) Andrew Watson	McLaren		Ret		
	(Spain) Daniel Juncadella (Puerto Rico) Félix Serrallés (France) Tristan Vautier	Mercedes-Benz		Ret		
	(United States) Dore Chaponick Jr. (United States) Scott Heckert (United States) Brett Sandberg	Mercedes-Benz		Ret		
	(United Kingdom) Craig Fleming (United Kingdom) Nick Leventis (United Kingdom) Oliver Webb (United Kingdom) Lewis Williamson	McLaren		Ret		
	(United Kingdom) Richard Abra (United Kingdom) Phil Keen (Russia) Leo Machitski (Portugal) Miguel Ramos	Lamborghini		Ret		
	(France) Ludovic Badey (Germany) Nico Bastian (Switzerland) Alex Fontana (Switzerland) Daniele Perfetti	Mercedes-Benz		Ret		
	(Germany) Patrick Assenheimer (Netherlands) Indy Dontje (Germany) Kenneth Heyer	Mercedes-Benz		Ret		
	(Germany) Maximilian Buhk (Sweden) Jimmy Eriksson (France) Franck Perera	Mercedes-Benz		Ret		
	(Germany) Jürgen Häring (Germany) Alfred Renauer (Germany) Robert Renauer	Porsche		Ret		
	(Spain) Albert Costa (Switzerland) Lorenz Frey (Monaco) Stéphane Ortelli	Jaguar		Ret		
	(Italy) Matteo Malucelli (Germany) Alexander Mattschull (Russia) Rinat Salikhov (Austria) Norbert Siedler	Ferrari		Ret		
	(Germany) Christer Jöns (South Africa) Jordan Pepper (Belgium) Nico Verdonck	Bentley		Ret		
	(Italy) Mirko Bortolotti (Italy) Andrea Caldarelli (Germany) Christian Engelhart	Lamborghini		Ret		
	(United Kingdom) James Calado (Italy) Marco Cioci (Italy) Giancarlo Fisichella	Ferrari		**Ret**		
	(Poland) Michał Broniszewski (Italy) Matteo Cressoni (Italy) Giacomo Piccini (Italy) Andrea Rizzoli	Ferrari		Ret		
	(Switzerland) Adrian Amstutz (United Kingdom) Oliver Gavin (Croatia) Martin Kodrić (Finland) Patrick Kujala	Lamborghini		Ret		
	(Italy) Andrea Bertolini (United Kingdom) Rory Butcher (Netherlands) Niek Hommerson (Belgium) Louis Machiels	Ferrari		Ret		
	(United Kingdom) Josh Caygill (United Kingdom) Richard Lyons (Austria) Nikolaus Mayr-Melnhof (Australia) Jonathan Venter	Audi		Ret		
	(Japan) Tatsuya Kataoka (Japan) Kamui Kobayashi (Japan) Nobuteru Taniguchi	Mercedes-Benz		Ret		
	(Italy) David Fumanelli (United Kingdom) Sam Tordoff	McLaren		Ret		
	(Saudi Arabia) Abdulaziz Bin Turki Al Faisal (Germany) Hubert Haupt (Italy) Gabriele Piana (Netherlands) Renger van der Zande	Mercedes-Benz		Ret		
	(Portugal) Filipe Albuquerque (Czech Republic) Filip Salaquarda (Austria) Clemens Schmid	Audi		Ret		
	(Switzerland) Jonathan Hirschi (Austria) Christian Klien (Germany) Marco Seefried	Jaguar		Ret		
	(United Kingdom) Jamie Green	Audi		Ret		
	(Thailand) Pasin Lathouras (Italy) Alessandro Pier Guidi (Italy) Michele Rugolo	Ferrari		Ret		
	(United States) Frank Gannett (United States) Ian Lacy (United States) Drew Staveley	Ginetta			Ret	
	(United States) Charles Espenlaub (United States) Charlie Putman	PROsport Porsche	DNS^{3}			
	(United States) Charles Espenlaub (United States) Charlie Putman	Aston Martin			Ret	
	(United States) Eric Lux	Aston Martin			Ret	
	(Netherlands) Peter Kox (Canada) Mark Wilkins	Acura			Ret	
	(United States) Joe Foster (United States) Andy Pilgrim	PROsport Porsche	DNS			
	(Australia) Will Davison	McLaren	DNS			
	(United Kingdom) Ricky Collard (Germany) Jörg Müller	BMW	DNS			
	(Switzerland) Andreas Baenziger (Australia) Peter Leemhuis (Denmark) Jan Struve	Aston Martin	WD			
Drivers ineligible to score points
	(Australia) Matt Campbell	Porsche	2			
	(Australia) John Martin (Australia) Duvashen Padayachee (Australia) Liam Talbot	Porsche	4			
	(United States) Tim Pappas	Porsche			5	
	(New Zealand) Daniel Gaunt	Audi	7			
	(Australia) Marc Cini (Australia) Dean Fiore (Australia) Lee Holdsworth	Audi	9			
	(Australia) Dean Canto	Lamborghini	10			
	(United States) Andy Lee	Porsche			10	
	(New Zealand) Simon Evans (Australia) James Koundouris (Australia) Theo Koundouris (Australia) Marcus Marshall	Audi	11			
Pos.	Driver	Manufacturer	BAT (Australia)	SPA (Belgium)	LGA (United States)	Points

Colour	Result
Gold	Winner
Silver	Second place
Bronze	Third place
Green	Points classification
Blue	Non-points classification
Blue	Non-classified finish (NC)
Purple	Retired, not classified (Ret)
Red	Did not qualify (DNQ)
Red	Did not pre-qualify (DNPQ)
Black	Disqualified (DSQ)
White	Did not start (DNS)
White	Withdrew (WD)
White	Race cancelled (C)
Blank	Did not practice (DNP)
Blank	Did not arrive (DNA)
Blank	Excluded (EX)

**Bold** – Pole
Italics – Fastest Lap

Notes

- ^{1} – Jules Gounon's result with Acura did not count, because he got a better result with Audi.
- ^{2} – Jeroen Bleekemolen's result with Mercedes-Benz did not count, because he got a better result with Porsche.
- ^{3} – Charles Espenlaub and Charles Putman's result with PROsport Porsche did not count, because they got a better result with Aston Martin.

=== Manufacturers' championships ===
If more than two cars of a specific manufacturer finished in the top 10, these cars would be considered invisible and their points would be redistributed to the next eligible car.

==== GT3 ====
Pos.	Manufacturer	Car	BAT (Australia)	SPA (Belgium)	LGA (United States)	Points
1	Audi	R8 LMS; R8 LMS ultra	7	1	1	87
1	Audi	R8 LMS; R8 LMS ultra	13	5	**2**	87
2	Porsche	911 GT3 R 997 GT3 R	2	4	5	48
2	Porsche	911 GT3 R 997 GT3 R	Ret	29	7	48
3	Bentley	Continental GT3	3	2		37
3	Bentley	Continental GT3	12	14		37
4	McLaren	650S GT3	5	32	3	27
4	McLaren	650S GT3	15	Ret		27
5	Ferrari	488 GT3	**1**	**17**		25
5	Ferrari	488 GT3		19		25
6	Mercedes-Benz	AMG GT3	Ret	3		23
6	Mercedes-Benz	AMG GT3	Ret	7		23
7	Acura	NSX GT3			4	12
7	Acura	NSX GT3			Ret	12
8	Reiter Engineering	Gallardo R-EX	6			10
8	Reiter Engineering	Gallardo R-EX	Ret			10
8	Nissan	GT-R Nismo GT3	8	13		10
8	Nissan	GT-R Nismo GT3	20	30		10
9	BMW	M6 GT3	14	10		6
9	BMW	M6 GT3	Ret	20		6
10	Lamborghini	Huracán GT3	10	16		4
10	Lamborghini	Huracán GT3		18		4
11	Aston Martin	Vantage GT3	Ret	15		1
12	Jaguar	XK Emil Frey G3		Ret		
12	Jaguar	XK Emil Frey G3		Ret		
Pos.	Manufacturer	Car	BAT (Australia)	SPA (Belgium)	LGA (United States)	Points

==== GT4 ====
Pos.	Manufacturer	Car	BAT (Australia)	LGA (United States)	Points
1	Porsche	Cayman GT4 Clubsport; Cayman GT4 Clubsport MR	17	9	61
1	Porsche	Cayman GT4 Clubsport; Cayman GT4 Clubsport MR	18^{1}	10	61
2	PROsport Porsche	Cayman PRO4 GT4	16		25
2	PROsport Porsche	Cayman PRO4 GT4	DNS		25
3	Ginetta	G55 GT4	19	Ret	15
3	Ginetta	G55 GT4	Ret		15
4	Aston Martin	Vantage GT4	WD	11	15
4	Aston Martin	Vantage GT4		**13**^{1}	15
	KTM	X-Bow GT4	**Ret**		
Pos.	Manufacturer	Car	BAT (Australia)	LGA (United States)	Points

Notes

- ^{1} – Results did not count towards championship.

== See also ==
- Intercontinental GT Challenge
