= 2017 Mazda Raceway California 8 Hours =

Race details
Date	15 October 2017
Location	Monterey, United States
Course	3.602 km (2.238 mi)
Weather	Qualifying: Sunny; Race: Sunny
- Race

Pole
Driver	(Germany) Christopher Haase	Audi Sport Team Land
Time	1:23.961

Podium
First	(Germany) Pierre Kaffer (South Africa) Kelvin van der Linde (Germany) Markus Winkelhock	Audi Sport Team Magnus
Second	(Germany) Christopher Haase (Germany) Christopher Mies (United States) Connor De Phillippi	Audi Sport Team Land
Third	(United Kingdom) Ben Barnicoat (Portugal) Álvaro Parente (United States) Bryan Sellers	K-PAX Racing

The 2017 Mazda Raceway California 8 Hours was the first Mazda Raceway California 8 Hours race held on Mazda Raceway Laguna Seca on 15 October 2017. The race was contested with GT3-spec cars, GT4-spec cars and MARC cars. The race was organized by the Stéphane Ratel Organisation (SRO).

== Event format ==
Day	Session	Time/distance
Thursday (12 October)	Testing	100 minutes
Friday (13 October)	Free practice	90 minutes
Friday (13 October)	Pre-qualifying practice	60 minutes
Saturday (14 October)	Qualifying	45 minutes
Saturday (14 October)	Pole shootout	15 minutes
Sunday (15 October)	Race	8 hours

== Race results ==
Class winners in bold.

Pos.	Class	No.	Drivers	Team	Car	Laps	Time/Retired
1	**GT3 Pro**	**44**	(Germany) **Pierre Kaffer** (South Africa) **Kelvin van der Linde** (Germany) **Markus Winkelhock**	(United States) **Audi Sport Team Magnus**	**Audi R8 LMS**	**314**	**8:00:27.641**
2	GT3 Pro	29	(Germany) Christopher Haase (Germany) Christopher Mies (United States) Connor De Phillippi	(Germany) Audi Sport Team Land	Audi R8 LMS	314	+2.488
3	GT3 Pro	9	(United Kingdom) Ben Barnicoat (Portugal) Álvaro Parente (United States) Bryan Sellers	(United States) K-PAX Racing	McLaren 650S GT3	314	+43.050
4	GT3 Pro	43	(United States) Dane Cameron (United States) Tom Dyer (United States) Ryan Eversley	(United States) RealTime Racing	Acura NSX GT3	313	+1 Lap
5	**GT3 Pro-Am**	**54**	(Netherlands) **Jeroen Bleekemolen** (Australia) **David Calvert-Jones** (United States) **Tim Pappas**	(United States) **Black Swan Racing**	**Porsche 911 GT3 R**	**312**	**+2 Laps**
6	GT3 Pro	11	(United Kingdom) Jake Dennis (Netherlands) Robin Frijns (United Kingdom) Stuart Leonard	(Belgium) Belgian Audi Club Team WRT	Audi R8 LMS	312	+2 Laps
7	GT3 Pro	17	(Germany) Wolf Henzler (Germany) Sven Müller (United States) Alec Udell	(United States) GMG Racing	Porsche 911 GT3 R	312	+2 Laps
8	GT3 Pro-Am	77	(United States) Preston Calvert (United States) Andrew Davis (United States) Michael Lewis	(United States) Calvert Dynamics / GMG Racing	Porsche 911 GT3 R	308	+6 Laps
9	**Inv**	**193**	(Australia) **Jake Camilleri** (Australia) **Morgan Haber** (Australia) **Hadrian Morrell**	**MARC Cars Australia**	**MARC Mazda 3 V8**	**294**	**+20 Laps**
10	Inv	194	(Papua New Guinea) Keith Kassulke (Australia) Ryan McLeod (United States) Will Rodgers	MARC Cars Australia	MARC Mazda 3 V8	294	+20 Laps
11	**GT4**	**26**	(United States) **Jeff Kearl** (United States) **Sean McAlister** (United States) **Jeff Westphal**	(United States) **Rearden Racing**	**Porsche Cayman GT4 Clubsport MR**	**286**	**+28 Laps**
12	GT4	8	(United States) Andy Lee (United States) Jon Miller (United States) Carter Yeung	(United States) HKG Racing / GMG Racing	Porsche Cayman GT4 Clubsport	286	+28 Laps
13	GT4	3	(United States) Craig Lyons (United States) Thomas Merrill (United States) Kris Wilson	(United States) TRG	Aston Martin Vantage GT4	280	+34 Laps
14	GT4	117	(United States) Daren Jorgensen (Bulgaria) Vesko Kozarov (United States) Hutton McKenna	(United States) Rearden Racing	Porsche Cayman GT4 Clubsport MR	280	+34 Laps
15	GT4	07	(United States) Michael Davis (United States) Derek DeBoer (United States) Greg Milzcik	(United States) TRG	Aston Martin Vantage GT4	266	+48 Laps
16	GT3 Pro	58	(Germany) Jörg Bergmeister (France) Romain Dumas (United States) Patrick Long	(United States) Porsche Motorsport North America by Wright Motorsports	Porsche 911 GT3 R	256	+58 Laps
Ret	GT4	12	(United States) Frank Gannett (United States) Ian Lacy (United States) Drew Staveley	(United States) Ian Lacy Racing	Ginetta G55 GT4	206	Retired
Ret	GT4	99	(United States) Charles Espenlaub (United States) Eric Lux (United States) Charlie Putman	(United States) Automatic Racing	Aston Martin Vantage GT4	136	Retired
Ret	GT3 Pro	93	(France) Jules Gounon (Netherlands) Peter Kox (Canada) Mark Wilkins	(United States) RealTime Racing	Acura NSX GT3	21	Cooling system

== See also ==
- 2017 Intercontinental GT Challenge
- Mazda Raceway Laguna Seca
