= 2017 Bathurst 12 Hour =

Endurance motorsports race in Australia

Layout of the Mount Panorama Circuit

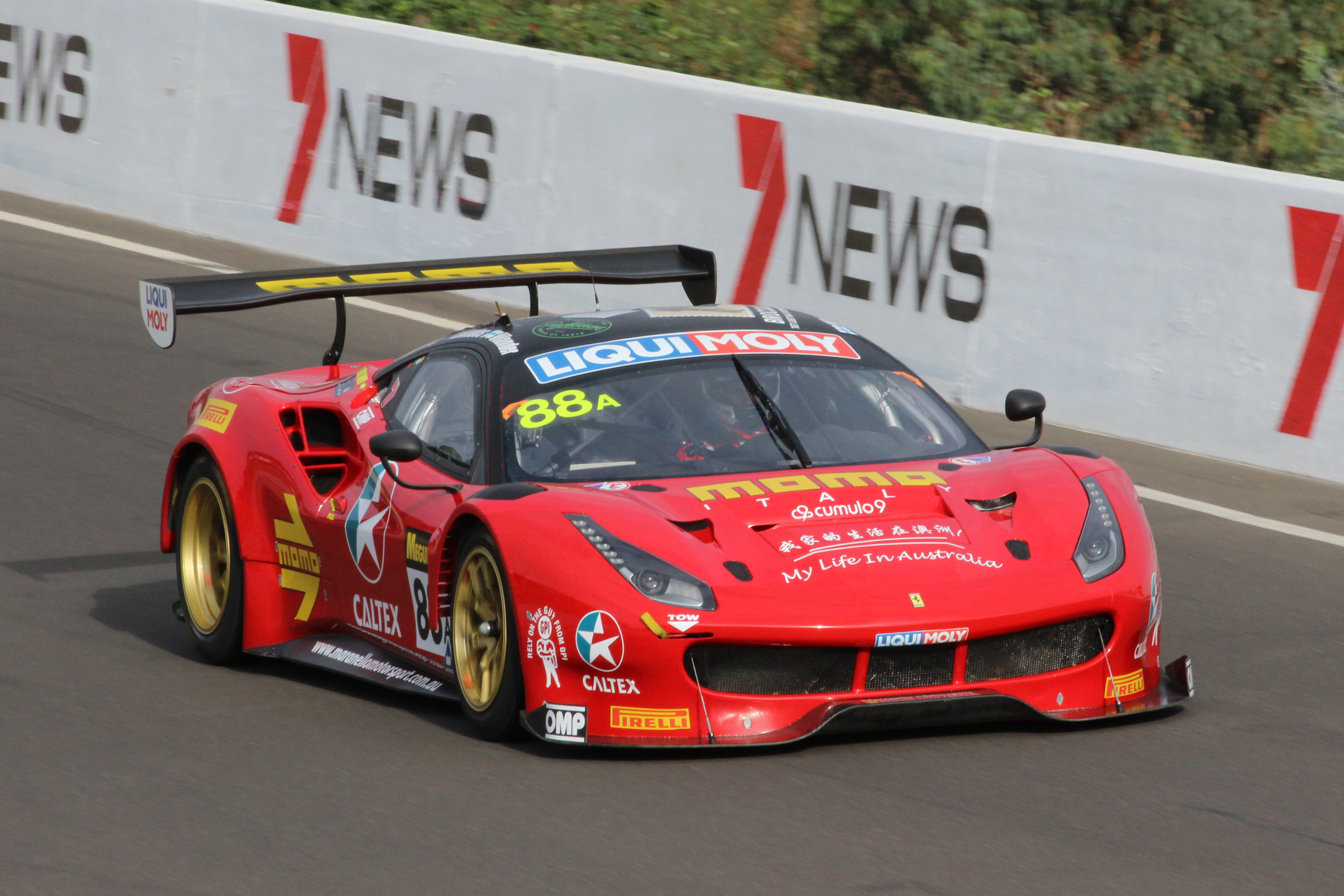
The race and Class APP-winning Ferrari 488 GT3 of Toni Vilander, Craig Lowndes and Jamie Whincup.

The 2017 Liqui Moly Bathurst 12 Hour endurance race was a motorsport event for GT3 cars, GT3 Cup cars, GT4 cars and invited vehicles. It was staged at the Mount Panorama Circuit, near Bathurst, in New South Wales, Australia on 5 February 2017. The race, which was the 15th running of the Bathurst 12 Hour, was the opening round of the 2017 Intercontinental GT Challenge Series. For the first time, the winners of the race were awarded the Australian Tourist Trophy.

Of the 2016 winning drivers, Shane van Gisbergen moved from Tekno Autosports and McLaren to Scott Taylor Motorsport's Mercedes-AMG GT3, prepared by HTP Motorsport with factory Mercedes backing, Álvaro Parente remained with Tekno Autosports and Tekno team owner Jonathon Webb did not drive.

The GT4 Class expanded for 2017 with eight entries, the Porsche Cayman, KTM X-Bow GT4, Ginetta G55 and Aston Martin Vantage GT4.

55 cars were entered (the largest field since the 2007 revival) and 51 cars started, with four entries withdrawn following crashes in practice and qualifying.

The race was won by Craig Lowndes, Jamie Whincup and Toni Vilander driving a Ferrari 488 GT3 entered by Maranello Motorsport.

== Class structure ==
2017 the first year all-professional driver rosters were permitted. Previously, teams were required one unseeded driver in each entry.

Cars competed in the following four classes.

- Class A – GT3 Outright
  - Class APP (GT3 Pro) – for driver combinations with no unseeded drivers.
  - Class APA (GT3 Pro-Am) – for driver combinations including one unseeded driver.
  - Class AAM (GT3 Am) – for driver combinations including two or three unseeded drivers.
- Class B – GT3 Cup Cars
- Class C – GT4
- Class I – Invitational

== Official results ==
Bold denotes category winner.

Pos.	Class	No.	Team / Entrant	Drivers	Car	Laps	Time/Retired
Pos.	Class	No.	Team / Entrant	Drivers	Engine	Laps	Time/Retired
1	**APP**	**88**	**(Australia) Maranello Motorsport**	**(Australia) Craig Lowndes (Australia) Jamie Whincup (Finland) Toni Vilander**	**Ferrari 488 GT3**	**290**	**12:00:36.966**
1	**APP**	**88**	**(Australia) Maranello Motorsport**	**(Australia) Craig Lowndes (Australia) Jamie Whincup (Finland) Toni Vilander**	**3.9 L Ferrari F154 twin-turbo V8**	**290**	**12:00:36.966**
2	**APA**	**12**	**(United States) Competition Motorsports**	**(Australia) David Calvert-Jones (United States) Patrick Long (Germany) Marc Lieb (Australia) Matt Campbell**	**Porsche 911 GT3 R**	**289**	**+1 lap**
2	**APA**	**12**	**(United States) Competition Motorsports**	**(Australia) David Calvert-Jones (United States) Patrick Long (Germany) Marc Lieb (Australia) Matt Campbell**	**4.0 L Porsche H6**	**289**	**+1 lap**
3	APP	17	(United Kingdom) Bentley Team M-Sport	(United Kingdom) Oliver Jarvis (United Kingdom) Steven Kane (United Kingdom) Guy Smith	Bentley Continental GT3	289	+1 lap
3	APP	17	(United Kingdom) Bentley Team M-Sport	(United Kingdom) Oliver Jarvis (United Kingdom) Steven Kane (United Kingdom) Guy Smith	4.0 L Volkswagen twin-turbo V8	289	+1 lap
4	**AAM**	**912**	**(Australia) Walkinshaw GT3 Racing**	**(Australia) Liam Talbot (Australia) John Martin (Australia) Duvashen Padayachee**	**Porsche 911 GT3 R**	**289**	**+1 lap**
4	**AAM**	**912**	**(Australia) Walkinshaw GT3 Racing**	**(Australia) Liam Talbot (Australia) John Martin (Australia) Duvashen Padayachee**	**4.0 L Porsche H6**	**289**	**+1 lap**
5	APP	1	(Australia) Tekno Autosports	(Portugal) Álvaro Parente (United Kingdom) Rob Bell (France) Côme Ledogar	McLaren 650S GT3	289	+1 lap
5	APP	1	(Australia) Tekno Autosports	(Portugal) Álvaro Parente (United Kingdom) Rob Bell (France) Côme Ledogar	3.8 L McLaren M838T twin-turbo V8	289	+1 lap
6	AAM	32	(Australia) Lago Racing	(Australia) Roger Lago (Australia) Steve Owen (Australia) David Russell	Lamborghini Gallardo R-EX	288	+2 laps
6	AAM	32	(Australia) Lago Racing	(Australia) Roger Lago (Australia) Steve Owen (Australia) David Russell	5.2 L Lamborghini V10	288	+2 laps
7	APA	3	(Australia) Team ASR	(Australia) Ash Samadi (New Zealand) Daniel Gaunt (New Zealand) Matt Halliday	Audi R8 LMS	288	+2 laps
7	APA	3	(Australia) Team ASR	(Australia) Ash Samadi (New Zealand) Daniel Gaunt (New Zealand) Matt Halliday	5.2 L FSI 2×DOHC Audi V10	288	+2 laps
8	APP	24	(Australia) Nissan Motorsport	(United Kingdom) Jann Mardenborough (Australia) Todd Kelly (Germany) Florian Strauss	Nissan GT-R Nismo GT3	288	+2 laps
8	APP	24	(Australia) Nissan Motorsport	(United Kingdom) Jann Mardenborough (Australia) Todd Kelly (Germany) Florian Strauss	3.8 L Nissan VR38DETT twin-turbo V6	288	+2 laps
9	APA	9	(Australia) Hallmarc Racing	(Australia) Marc Cini (Australia) Dean Fiore (Australia) Lee Holdsworth	Audi R8 LMS	287	+3 laps
9	APA	9	(Australia) Hallmarc Racing	(Australia) Marc Cini (Australia) Dean Fiore (Australia) Lee Holdsworth	5.2 L FSI 2×DOHC Audi V10	287	+3 laps
10	AAM	29	(Australia) Trofeo Motorsport	(Italy) Ivan Capelli (Australia) Jim Manolios (Australia) Ryan Millier (Australia) Dean Canto	Lamborghini Huracán GT3	285	+5 laps
10	AAM	29	(Australia) Trofeo Motorsport	(Italy) Ivan Capelli (Australia) Jim Manolios (Australia) Ryan Millier (Australia) Dean Canto	5.2 L Lamborghini V10	285	+5 laps
11	AAM	44	(Australia) Supabarn Supermarkets Racing	(Australia) James Koundouris (Australia) Theo Koundouris (Australia) Marcus Marshall (New Zealand) Simon Evans	Audi R8 LMS	284	+6 laps
11	AAM	44	(Australia) Supabarn Supermarkets Racing	(Australia) James Koundouris (Australia) Theo Koundouris (Australia) Marcus Marshall (New Zealand) Simon Evans	5.2 L FSI 2×DOHC Audi V10	284	+6 laps
12	APP	8	(United Kingdom) Bentley Team M-Sport	(Spain) Andy Soucek (Belgium) Maxime Soulet (Monaco) Vincent Abril	Bentley Continental GT3	283	+7 laps
12	APP	8	(United Kingdom) Bentley Team M-Sport	(Spain) Andy Soucek (Belgium) Maxime Soulet (Monaco) Vincent Abril	4.0 L Volkswagen twin-turbo V8	283	+7 laps
13	APP	75	(Australia) Jamec Pem Racing	(Germany) Christopher Haase (Germany) Christopher Mies (Australia) Garth Tander	Audi R8 LMS	282	+8 laps
13	APP	75	(Australia) Jamec Pem Racing	(Germany) Christopher Haase (Germany) Christopher Mies (Australia) Garth Tander	5.2 L FSI 2×DOHC Audi V10	282	+8 laps
14	APP	60	(New Zealand) BMW Team SRM	(New Zealand) Steven Richards (Germany) Marco Wittmann (Australia) Mark Winterbottom	BMW M6 GT3	281	+9 laps
14	APP	60	(New Zealand) BMW Team SRM	(New Zealand) Steven Richards (Germany) Marco Wittmann (Australia) Mark Winterbottom	4.4 L S63 BMW V8	281	+9 laps
15	**B**	**21**	**(New Zealand) Steven Richards Motorsport**	**(Australia) Dean Grant (Australia) Dylan O'Keeffe (Australia) Xavier West (Australia) David Wall**	**Porsche 991 GT3 Cup**	**274**	**+16 laps**
15	**B**	**21**	**(New Zealand) Steven Richards Motorsport**	**(Australia) Dean Grant (Australia) Dylan O'Keeffe (Australia) Xavier West (Australia) David Wall**	**3.8 L Porsche H6**	**274**	**+16 laps**
16	B	50	(Australia) Synep Racing	(Australia) Josh Cranston (Australia) Adam Cranston (Australia) Aaron Steer (United Kingdom) James Winslow	Porsche 991 GT3 Cup	272	+18 laps
16	B	50	(Australia) Synep Racing	(Australia) Josh Cranston (Australia) Adam Cranston (Australia) Aaron Steer (United Kingdom) James Winslow	3.8 L Porsche H6	272	+18 laps
17	**I**	**91**	**MARC Cars Australia**	**(Australia) Will Brown (Papua New Guinea) Keith Kassulke (Australia) Rod Salmon**	**MARC Focus V8**	**270**	**+20 laps**
17	**I**	**91**	**MARC Cars Australia**	**(Australia) Will Brown (Papua New Guinea) Keith Kassulke (Australia) Rod Salmon**	**5.0 L Ford Coyote V8**	**270**	**+20 laps**
18	I	92	MARC Cars Australia	(Australia) Michael Benton (Australia) Hadrian Morrall (Australia) Aaron Seton (Australia) Glenn Seton	MARC Focus V8	270	+20 laps
18	I	92	MARC Cars Australia	(Australia) Michael Benton (Australia) Hadrian Morrall (Australia) Aaron Seton (Australia) Glenn Seton	5.0 L Ford Coyote V8	270	+20 laps
19	B	14	(Australia) IKAD Racing	(Australia) Peter Major (Australia) Jordan Love (Australia) Nick McBride	Porsche 997 GT3 Cup	269	+21 laps
19	B	14	(Australia) IKAD Racing	(Australia) Peter Major (Australia) Jordan Love (Australia) Nick McBride	3.6 L Porsche H6	269	+21 laps
20	APA	11	(Australia) Objective Racing	(Australia) Alex Davison (Australia) Warren Luff (Australia) Tim Slade (Australia) Tony Walls	McLaren 650S GT3	268	+22 laps
20	APA	11	(Australia) Objective Racing	(Australia) Alex Davison (Australia) Warren Luff (Australia) Tim Slade (Australia) Tony Walls	3.8 L McLaren M838T twin-turbo V8	268	+22 laps
21	I	93	MARC Cars Australia	(Australia) Jake Camilleri (Australia) Jack Smith (Australia) Rob Thomson	MARC Mazda 3 V8	267	+23 laps
21	I	93	MARC Cars Australia	(Australia) Jake Camilleri (Australia) Jack Smith (Australia) Rob Thomson	5.0 L Ford Coyote V8	267	+23 laps
22	B	6	(Australia) Wall Racing	(Australia) Richard Gartner (Australia) Ric Shaw (Australia) Indiran Padayachee (Australia) Aaron Zerefos	Porsche 997 GT3 Cup	267	+23 laps
22	B	6	(Australia) Wall Racing	(Australia) Richard Gartner (Australia) Ric Shaw (Australia) Indiran Padayachee (Australia) Aaron Zerefos	3.6 L Porsche H6	267	+23 laps
23	**C**	**19**	**(Germany) PROsport Performance**	**(Netherlands) Max Braams (Denmark) Nicolaj Møller Madsen (Germany) Jörg Viebahn (Australia) Harri Jones**	**Porsche Cayman Pro 4**	**263**	**+27 laps**
23	**C**	**19**	**(Germany) PROsport Performance**	**(Netherlands) Max Braams (Denmark) Nicolaj Møller Madsen (Germany) Jörg Viebahn (Australia) Harri Jones**	**3.4 L Porsche H6**	**263**	**+27 laps**
24	C	40	(United Kingdom) Brookspeed	(United Kingdom) Aaron Mason (United Kingdom) David Drinkwater (United Kingdom) Adrian Watt	Porsche Cayman GT4 Clubsport	260	+30 laps
24	C	40	(United Kingdom) Brookspeed	(United Kingdom) Aaron Mason (United Kingdom) David Drinkwater (United Kingdom) Adrian Watt	3.8 L Porsche H6	260	+30 laps
25	I	95	MARC Cars Australia	(Australia) Geoff Taunton (Australia) Jason Busk (Australia) Bryce Fullwood	MARC Focus V8	258	+32 laps
25	I	95	MARC Cars Australia	(Australia) Geoff Taunton (Australia) Jason Busk (Australia) Bryce Fullwood	5.0 L Ford Coyote V8	258	+32 laps
26	I	76	(Switzerland) R-Motorsport	(Germany) Markus Lungstrass (Austria) Florian Kamelger (United Kingdom) Darren Turner	Aston Martin Vantage GT8	253	+37 laps
26	I	76	(Switzerland) R-Motorsport	(Germany) Markus Lungstrass (Austria) Florian Kamelger (United Kingdom) Darren Turner	4.7 L Aston Martin V8	253	+37 laps
27	C	41	(United Kingdom) Brookspeed	(Australia) Coleby Cowham (Australia) Lindsay Kearns (Australia) Ashley Jarvis	Porsche Cayman GT4 Clubsport	249	+41 laps
27	C	41	(United Kingdom) Brookspeed	(Australia) Coleby Cowham (Australia) Lindsay Kearns (Australia) Ashley Jarvis	3.8 L Porsche H6	249	+41 laps
28	C	69	(Malaysia) Ayelzo Ecotint Racing	(Australia) Jake Parsons (Japan) Shinyo Sano (Malaysia) Zen Low (Australia) Aidan Read	Ginetta G55	247	+43 laps
28	C	69	(Malaysia) Ayelzo Ecotint Racing	(Australia) Jake Parsons (Japan) Shinyo Sano (Malaysia) Zen Low (Australia) Aidan Read	3.7 L Ford Cyclone V6	247	+43 laps
29	I	65	(Australia) Daytona Sports Cars	(Australia) Jamie Augustine (Australia) Dean Lillie (Australia) Benjamin Schoots	Dodge Viper Competition Coupe	226	+64 laps
29	I	65	(Australia) Daytona Sports Cars	(Australia) Jamie Augustine (Australia) Dean Lillie (Australia) Benjamin Schoots	8.3 L Viper V10	226	+64 laps
30	I	94	MARC Cars Australia	(Australia) Tim Leahey (Australia) Gerard McLeod (Australia) Nick Rowe (Australia) Leanne Tander	MARC Mazda 3 V8	218	+72 laps
30	I	94	MARC Cars Australia	(Australia) Tim Leahey (Australia) Gerard McLeod (Australia) Nick Rowe (Australia) Leanne Tander	5.0 L Ford Coyote V8	218	+72 laps
31	AAM	38	(Australia) Wall Racing	(Hong Kong) Daniel Bilski (Australia) Adrian Flack (New Zealand) Chris Pither	Nissan GT-R Nismo GT3	200	+90 laps
31	AAM	38	(Australia) Wall Racing	(Hong Kong) Daniel Bilski (Australia) Adrian Flack (New Zealand) Chris Pither	3.8 L Nissan VR38DETT twin-turbo V6	200	+90 laps
32	APP	23	(Australia) Nissan Motorsport	(United Kingdom) Alex Buncombe (Japan) Katsumasa Chiyo (Australia) Michael Caruso	Nissan GT-R Nismo GT3	174	+116 laps
32	APP	23	(Australia) Nissan Motorsport	(United Kingdom) Alex Buncombe (Japan) Katsumasa Chiyo (Australia) Michael Caruso	3.8 L Nissan VR38DETT twin-turbo V6	174	+116 laps
DNF	APP	22	(Australia) Scott Taylor Motorsport	(New Zealand) Shane van Gisbergen (New Zealand) Craig Baird (Germany) Maro Engel	Mercedes-AMG GT3	282	Crash
DNF	APP	22	(Australia) Scott Taylor Motorsport	(New Zealand) Shane van Gisbergen (New Zealand) Craig Baird (Germany) Maro Engel	6.2 L Mercedes-Benz M159 V8	282	Crash
DNF	AAM	2	(Australia) DJS Racing	(Australia) James Bergmuller (New Zealand) Sam Fillmore (Australia) Danny Stutterd	Audi R8 LMS Ultra	272	Crash
DNF	AAM	2	(Australia) DJS Racing	(Australia) James Bergmuller (New Zealand) Sam Fillmore (Australia) Danny Stutterd	5.2 L FSI 2×DOHC Audi V10	272	Crash
DNF	APA	83	(Germany) HTP Motorsport	(Canada) Paul Dalla Lana (Portugal) Pedro Lamy (Austria) Mathias Lauda (Germany) Bernd Schneider	Mercedes-AMG GT3	263	Chassis damage
DNF	APA	83	(Germany) HTP Motorsport	(Canada) Paul Dalla Lana (Portugal) Pedro Lamy (Austria) Mathias Lauda (Germany) Bernd Schneider	6.2 L Mercedes-Benz M159 V8	263	Chassis damage
DNF	C	48	(Australia) M Motorsport	(Australia) Justin McMillan (Australia) Glen Wood (Czech Republic) Tomáš Enge (Austria) Reinhard Kofler	KTM X-Bow GT4	220	Fire
DNF	C	48	(Australia) M Motorsport	(Australia) Justin McMillan (Australia) Glen Wood (Czech Republic) Tomáš Enge (Austria) Reinhard Kofler	2.0 L Audi 16v TFSI turbocharged I4	220	Fire
DNF	I	54	(Australia) Donut King Racing	(Australia) Tony Alford (Australia) Beric Lynton (United Kingdom) Jeff Smith	MARC Focus V8	217	Crash
DNF	I	54	(Australia) Donut King Racing	(Australia) Tony Alford (Australia) Beric Lynton (United Kingdom) Jeff Smith	5.0 L Ford Coyote V8	217	Crash
DNF	AAM	51	(Australia) AMAC Motorsport	(Australia) Andrew Macpherson (Australia) Neale Muston (Australia) Tim Miles	Porsche 911 GT3 R	210	Crash
DNF	AAM	51	(Australia) AMAC Motorsport	(Australia) Andrew Macpherson (Australia) Neale Muston (Australia) Tim Miles	3.8 L Porsche H6	210	Crash
DNF	AAM	66	(Australia) Wall Racing	(Australia) Brett Hobson (United States) Erik Davis (United States) Fred Poordad	Nissan GT-R Nismo GT3	202	Crash
DNF	AAM	66	(Australia) Wall Racing	(Australia) Brett Hobson (United States) Erik Davis (United States) Fred Poordad	3.8 L Nissan VR38DETT twin-turbo V6	202	Crash
DNF	C	55	(Australia) RA Motorsports	(Australia) Tim Berryman (Australia) Peter Paddon (United Kingdom) Mike Simpson	Ginetta G55	172	Crash
DNF	C	55	(Australia) RA Motorsports	(Australia) Tim Berryman (Australia) Peter Paddon (United Kingdom) Mike Simpson	3.7 L Ford Cyclone V6	172	Crash
DNF	AAM	5	(Australia) GT Motorsport	(Australia) Nathan Antunes (Australia) Elliot Barbour (Australia) Greg Taylor	Audi R8 LMS	161	Spun off
DNF	AAM	5	(Australia) GT Motorsport	(Australia) Nathan Antunes (Australia) Elliot Barbour (Australia) Greg Taylor	5.2 L FSI 2×DOHC Audi V10	161	Spun off
DNF	APA	61	(Australia) Griffith Corporation	(Australia) Mark Griffith (New Zealand) Dominic Storey (Australia) David Reynolds	Mercedes-AMG GT3	157	Crash
DNF	APA	61	(Australia) Griffith Corporation	(Australia) Mark Griffith (New Zealand) Dominic Storey (Australia) David Reynolds	6.2 L Mercedes-Benz M159 V8	157	Crash
DNF	AAM	90	MARC Cars Australia	(Australia) Chaz Mostert (Australia) Morgan Haber (Australia) Max Twigg	BMW M6 GT3	136	Gearbox
DNF	AAM	90	MARC Cars Australia	(Australia) Chaz Mostert (Australia) Morgan Haber (Australia) Max Twigg	4.4 L S63 BMW V8	136	Gearbox
DNF	APP	7	(Australia) BMW Team SRM	(Germany) Timo Glock (Australia) Russell Ingall (Australia) Tony Longhurst (Australia) Mark Skaife	BMW M6 GT3	134	Crash
DNF	APP	7	(Australia) BMW Team SRM	(Germany) Timo Glock (Australia) Russell Ingall (Australia) Tony Longhurst (Australia) Mark Skaife	4.4 L S63 BMW V8	134	Crash
DNF	AAM	47	(New Zealand) Kiwi Racing	(New Zealand) Glenn Smith (New Zealand) Kevin Bell (New Zealand) Nicholas Chester (New Zealand) John de Veth	Lamborghini Gallardo R-EX	133	Engine
DNF	AAM	47	(New Zealand) Kiwi Racing	(New Zealand) Glenn Smith (New Zealand) Kevin Bell (New Zealand) Nicholas Chester (New Zealand) John de Veth	5.2 L Lamborghini V10	133	Engine
DNF	I	28	(Australia) On Track Motorsport	(Australia) Garry Mennell (New Zealand) Bernard Verryt (Belgium) Steve van Bellingen	BMW 335i	111	Brakes
DNF	I	28	(Australia) On Track Motorsport	(Australia) Garry Mennell (New Zealand) Bernard Verryt (Belgium) Steve van Bellingen	3.0 L BMW N55 twin-turbo I6	111	Brakes
DNF	AAM	37	(Australia) Keltic Racing	(Australia) Klark Quinn (United Kingdom) Tony Quinn (Australia) Grant Denyer (New Zealand) Andrew Waite	McLaren 650S GT3	95	Crash
DNF	AAM	37	(Australia) Keltic Racing	(Australia) Klark Quinn (United Kingdom) Tony Quinn (Australia) Grant Denyer (New Zealand) Andrew Waite	3.8 L McLaren M838T twin-turbo V8	95	Crash
DNF	AAM	35	(Australia) Miedecke Stone Motorsport	(Australia) George Miedecke (Australia) Ash Walsh (Australia) Tony Bates	Aston Martin Vantage GT3	75	Crash
DNF	AAM	35	(Australia) Miedecke Stone Motorsport	(Australia) George Miedecke (Australia) Ash Walsh (Australia) Tony Bates	6.0 L Aston Martin V12	75	Crash
DNF	APP	911	(Australia) Walkinshaw GT3 Racing	(New Zealand) Earl Bamber (France) Kévin Estre (Belgium) Laurens Vanthoor	Porsche 911 GT3 R	44	Steering Rack
DNF	APP	911	(Australia) Walkinshaw GT3 Racing	(New Zealand) Earl Bamber (France) Kévin Estre (Belgium) Laurens Vanthoor	4.0 L Porsche H6	44	Steering Rack
DNF	B	4	(Australia) Grove Motorsport	(Australia) Stephen Grove (United Kingdom) Ben Barker (Switzerland) Alexandre Imperatori	Porsche 991 GT3 Cup	32	Crash
DNF	B	4	(Australia) Grove Motorsport	(Australia) Stephen Grove (United Kingdom) Ben Barker (Switzerland) Alexandre Imperatori	3.8 L Porsche H6	32	Crash
DNF	APP	74	(Australia) Jamec Pem Racing	(Germany) Markus Winkelhock (Netherlands) Robin Frijns (Germany) Frank Stippler	Audi R8 LMS	6	Crash
DNF	APP	74	(Australia) Jamec Pem Racing	(Germany) Markus Winkelhock (Netherlands) Robin Frijns (Germany) Frank Stippler	5.2 L FSI 2×DOHC Audi V10	6	Crash
DNS	C	18	(Germany) PROsport Performance	(United States) Charles Putman (United States) Charles Espenlaub (United States) Joe Foster (United States) Andy Pilgrim	Porsche Cayman Pro 4		Crash in Qualifying
DNS	C	18	(Germany) PROsport Performance	(United States) Charles Putman (United States) Charles Espenlaub (United States) Joe Foster (United States) Andy Pilgrim	3.4 L Porsche H6		Crash in Qualifying
DNS	APP	59	(Australia) Tekno Autosports	(United Kingdom) Ben Barnicoat (Australia) Will Davison (United Kingdom) Jonny Kane	McLaren 650S GT3		Crash in Qualifying
DNS	APP	59	(Australia) Tekno Autosports	(United Kingdom) Ben Barnicoat (Australia) Will Davison (United Kingdom) Jonny Kane	3.8 L McLaren M838T twin-turbo V8		Crash in Qualifying
DNS	APP	99	(Germany) Walkenhorst Motorsport	(Germany) Jörg Müller (Germany) Nico Menzel (United Kingdom) Ricky Collard	BMW M6 GT3		Crash in Qualifying
DNS	APP	99	(Germany) Walkenhorst Motorsport	(Germany) Jörg Müller (Germany) Nico Menzel (United Kingdom) Ricky Collard	4.4 L S63 BMW V8		Crash in Qualifying
DNS	C	62	(Switzerland) R-Motorsport	(Switzerland) Andreas Baenziger (Australia) Peter Leemhuis (Denmark) Jan Struve	Aston Martin Vantage GT4		Crash in Practice 5
DNS	C	62	(Switzerland) R-Motorsport	(Switzerland) Andreas Baenziger (Australia) Peter Leemhuis (Denmark) Jan Struve	4.7 L Aston Martin V8		Crash in Practice 5

- Race time of winning car: 12:00:36.966
- Fastest race lap: 2:02.908 – Toni Vilander
