= MARC Cars Australia =

Australian motor racing team and manufacturer

MARC Cars Australia Pty Ltd
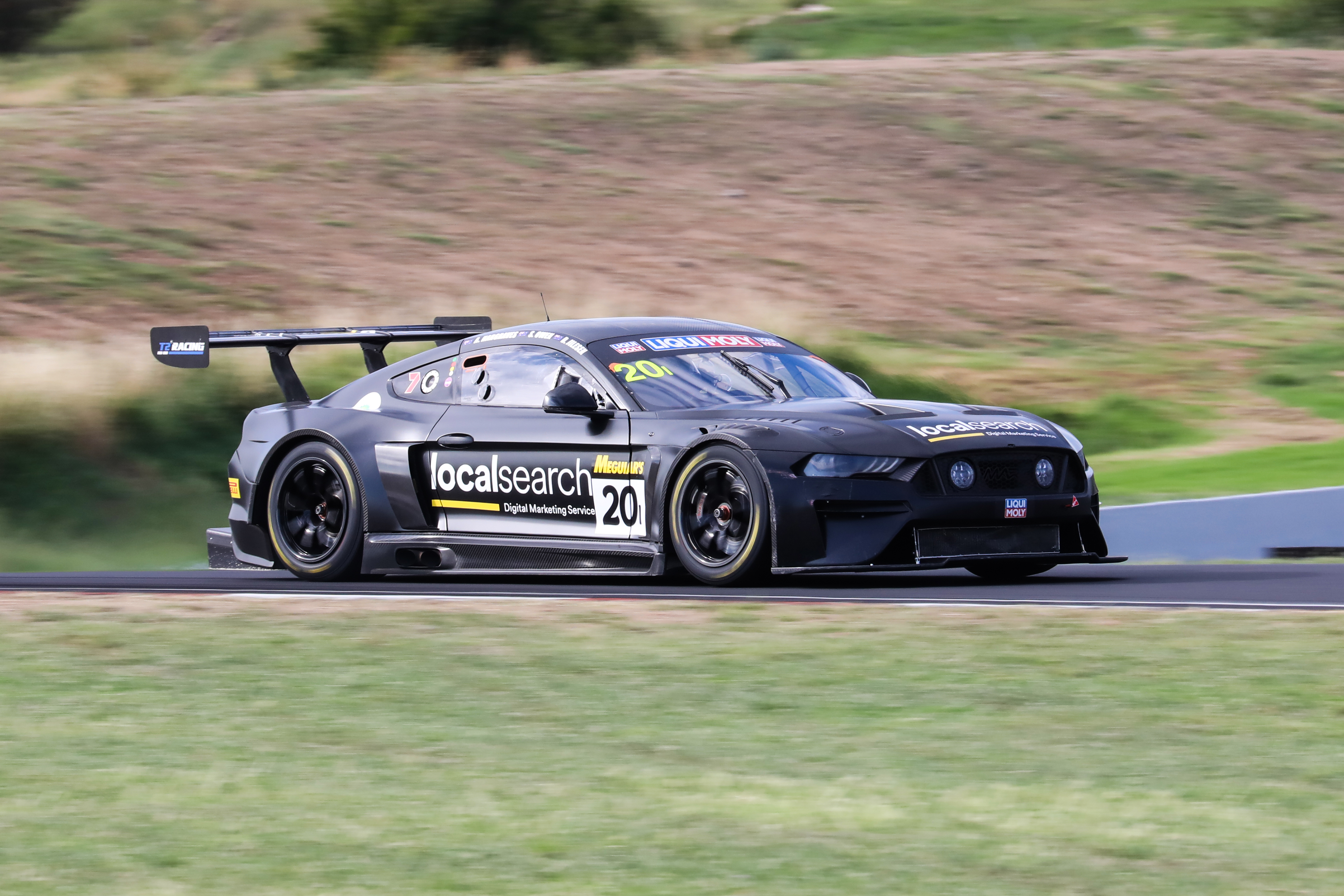
- Industry: Automotive
- Founded: 2013
- Founder: Ryan McLeod
- Headquarters: Norwell, Australia
- Products: MARC Focus GTC; MARC Mazda3 GTC; MARC II V8; MARC GT
- Services: Automobile manufacturing
- Owner: Geoff Taunton
- Website: www.marccarsaustralia.com.au/

MARC Cars Australia is an Australian auto racing team and racecar manufacturer, who compete internationally in sports car and endurance racing events, mostly in their own GTC prototype cars.

== Racing history ==
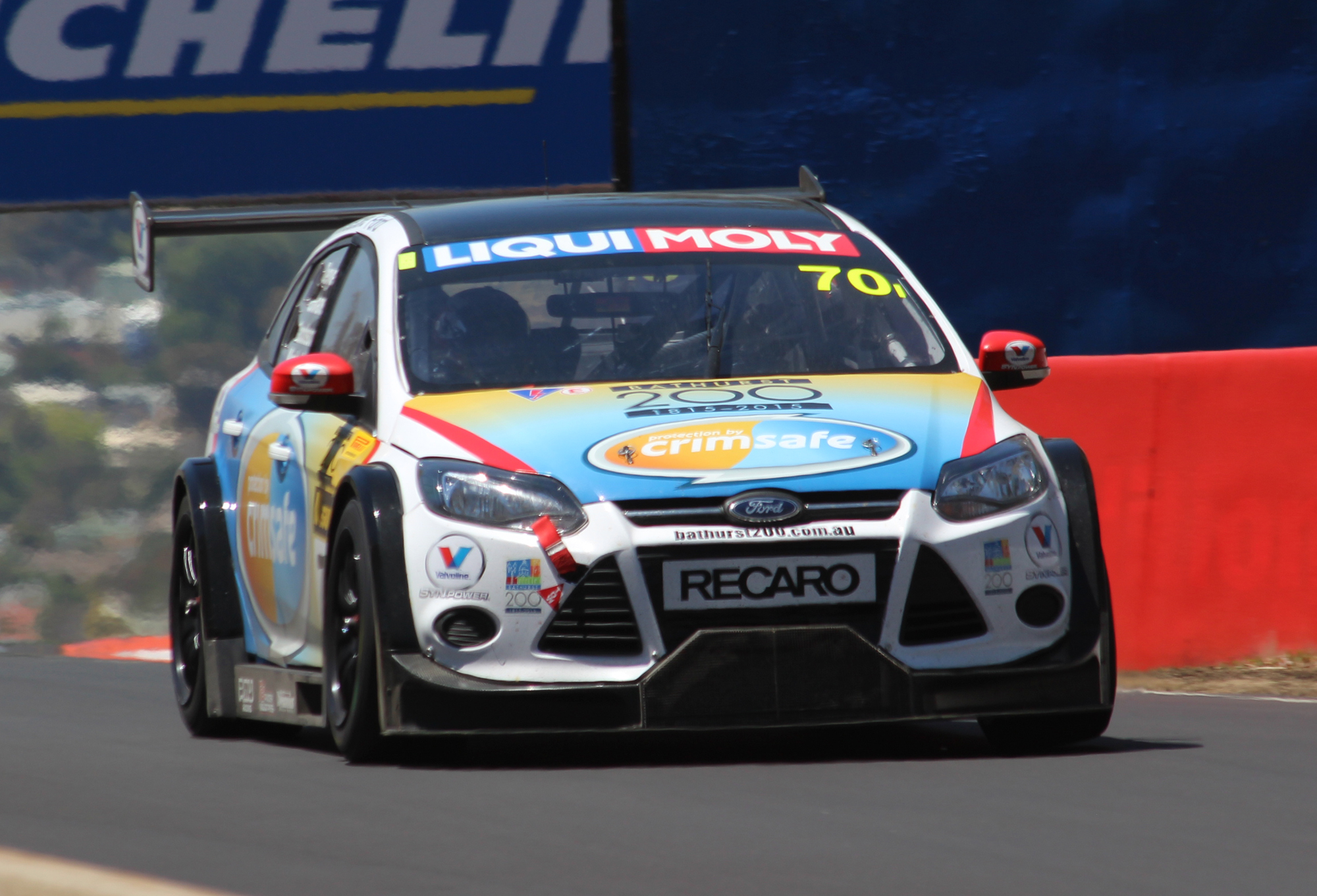
The MARC Focus GTC which won the Invitational class at the 2014 Liqui Moly Bathurst 12 Hour.

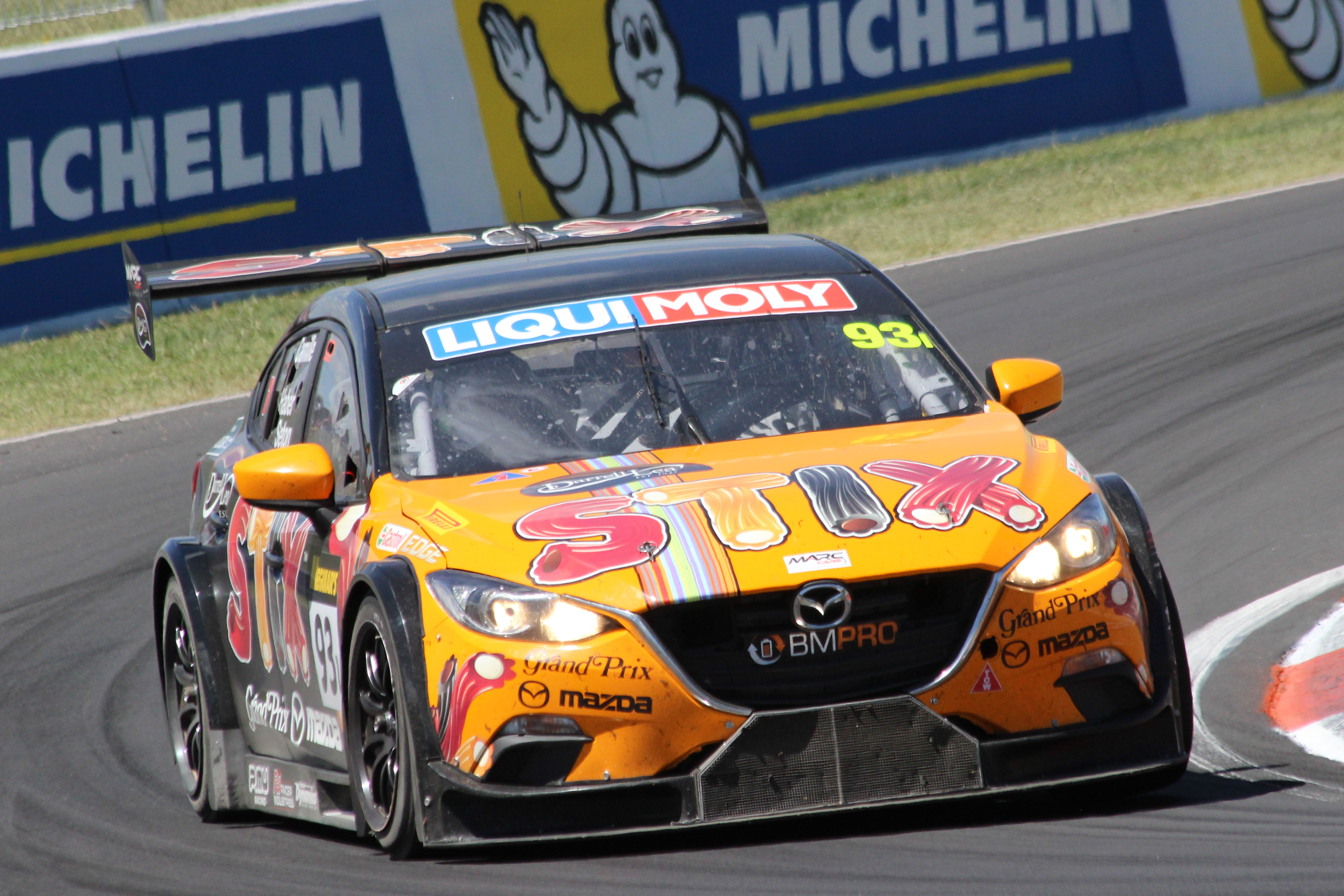
The MARC Mazda3 GTC which won the Invitational class at the 2016 Liqui Moly Bathurst 12 Hour.

=== Production ===
Founder Ryan McLeod entered several editions of the Bathurst 12 Hour under the team's former name, Racer Industries. After an initial foray in 2009 with father Peter and brother Gerard, the family entry, driving a Holden Astra SRi returned in 2010 to win its class. In the years following, the team moved away from a family focus, instead providing opportunities to various young drivers including Chaz Mostert, Scott Pye and Ashley Walsh in a HSV VXR Turbo. The team won further class victories in 2012, in which the team finished seventh overall, and in 2013.

=== GTC ===
In 2013, an initial GTC prototype was built and tested by Pace Innovations, following their work on new chassis for the Supercars Championship and V8SuperTourer series. The initial model, styled as a Ford Focus, featured a five-litre Ford Coyote V8 engine and was tested at Queensland Raceway by Glenn Seton and Russell Ingall amongst others. After an initial plan to run the cars in South Africa, Racer Industries developed a package based on the GTC prototype and entered three cars, now each branded as a MARC, in the Invitational class of the 2014 Liqui Moly Bathurst 12 Hour.

McLeod used the event as a launching pad for developing and promoting a package that could compete in global endurance races on a reduced budget. The team, or its cars, have since competed in the Silverstone 24 Hours, Dubai 24 Hour and Sepang 12 Hours amongst others. In 2015, the team competed in the full season of the 24H Series, consisting of six 12 or 24 hour races globally. Since then, VDS Racing Adventures have used MARC cars in the series. In 2015, MARC also unveiled a Mazda3-styled body panel kit to enter the 2015 Liqui Moly Bathurst 12 Hour, which still used the Ford Coyote engine.

In 2014, MARC Cars were given their own class in the National Sports Sedan Series, while they are also eligible for the Australian GT Trophy Series as of 2016. With the Invitational class at the Bathurst 12 Hour predominantly made up of MARC entries, the team has won four consecutive class victories with the GTC prototypes, which extends to six when taking into account their HSV victories.

In 2017, MARC Cars competed in the United States for the first time, with entries in the California 8 Hours at Mazda Raceway Laguna Seca and the 24H COTA at the Circuit of the Americas.

=== II V8 ===
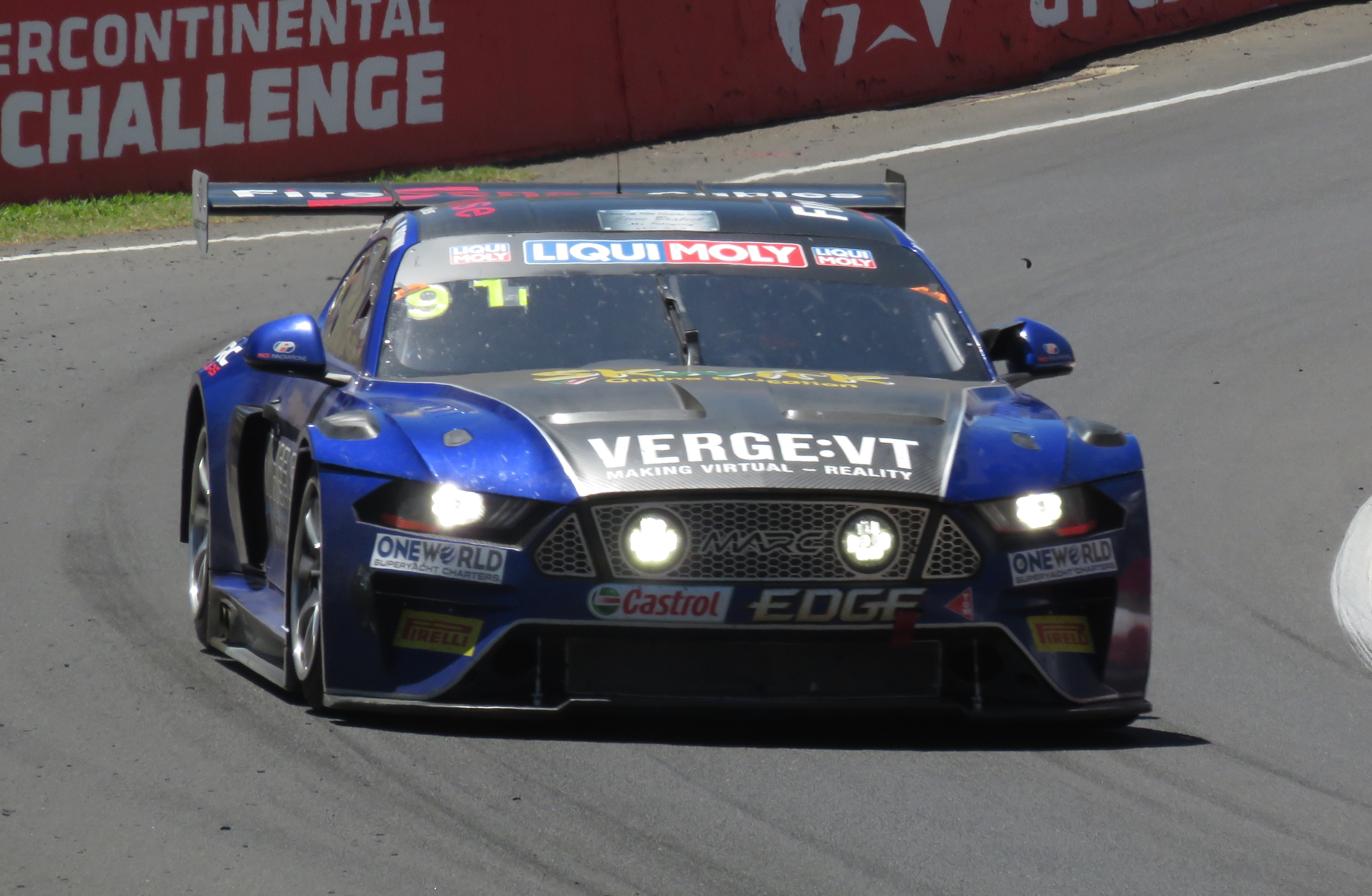
The MARC II V8 which won the Invitational class at the 2018 Liqui Moly Bathurst 12 Hour.

Ahead of the 2018 Liqui Moly Bathurst 12 Hour, MARC Cars Australia launched the MARC II V8, their second generation GTC racer unofficially styled on the Ford Mustang. Their three entries in the Bathurst 12 Hour were allowed to lap in the 2:06s bracket, having previously been restricted to 2:10s. With MARC Cars making up seven of the nine entries in the Invitational class, the manufacturer picked up another class victory, with the sole remaining MARC II V8 finishing ahead of the first generation MARC entries.

=== GT3 and GT4 ===
In 2016, MARC Cars acquired a BMW M6 GT3 and entered it in selected rounds of the 2016 Australian GT Championship, including hiring factory BMW driver Bruno Spengler to drive with regular driver Morgan Haber at the Phillip Island round. The team also entered their M6 GT3, as well as a record six GTC entries, at the 2017 Liqui Moly Bathurst 12 Hour with Chaz Mostert as lead driver. Mostert qualified second on the grid, however the car did not finish the race after suffering a Gearbox failure. From the 2018 Bathurst 12 Hour, MARC Cars prepared a BMW M4 GT4 for American entry RHC-Lawrence/Strom.

=== IRC GT ===
IRC GT
- Constructor: PACE Innovations
- Production: 2023

Technical specifications
- Chassis: Chromoly space frame
- Suspension: Double-wishbone front and rear suspension, 4-way adjustable KW dampers
- Length: 4,934 mm (194.3 in)
- Width: 2,010 mm (79 in)
- Axle track: 1,720 mm (68 in)
- Wheelbase: 2,800 mm (110 in)
- Engine: GM LS3 6.2 L; 376.0 cu in (6,162 cc) V8 Naturally-aspirated FR layout
- Torque: 705 N⋅m (520 lb⋅ft)
- Transmission: Holinger MFT 6-speed sequential
- Power: 550 hp (558 PS; 410 kW)
- Weight: 1,125 kg (2,480.2 lb)
- Brakes: Brembo ventilated steel discs Front: 380mm x 35mm Rear: 313mm x 25.4mm
- Tyres: Michelin; Pirelli

Competition history
- Notable entrants: (Australia) 111 Racing (Australia) Matt Stone Racing (Australia) Localsearch T2 Racing
- Notable drivers: (Australia) Jake Camilleri (Australia) Darren Currie (Australia) Mark Griffith (Canada) Paul Tracy
- Debut: 2024 Bathurst 12 Hour
| Races | Wins | Podiums | Poles | F/Laps |
|---|---|---|---|---|
| 7 | 0 overall 3 class | 6 | 3 | 1 |
- Teams' Championships: 1 (2025 Middle East Trophy)
- Drivers' Championships: 1 (2025 Middle East Trophy)

The IRC GT was launched in 2023, built and designed by PACE Innovations with car performance aimed at competing against FIA GT3 cars. It made its competitive debut at the 2024 Bathurst 12 Hour, sweeping the Invitational class podium. Australian team 111 Racing, finished in second twice during the 2025 Middle East Trophy, claiming the drivers' and teams' championship. Former Indycar driver, Paul Tracy entered the car into the first two rounds of the 2025 Trans Am Series in the XGT class at Sebring and Road Atlanta. He started on pole and won both races and led the most laps in class

== Company history ==
In 2020, GJ Motorsport, run by Geoff Taunton and a former customer team using MARC's prototypes, purchased the company from Ryan McLeod.

== Cars ==
| Car Name | Body Style | Engine | Image |
|---|---|---|---|
| MARC Focus GTC | Ford Focus | Ford 5.0 L Coyote V8 | |
| MARC Mazda3 GTC | Mazda3 | Ford 5.0 L Coyote V8 | |
| MARC BMW M235i GTC | BMW M235i | Ford 5.0 L Coyote V8 | |
| MARC II V8 | Ford Mustang | Ford 5.2 L Coyote V8 | |
| MARC IRC GT | Mercedes C63 | GM 6.2 L LS3 | |
| MARC GT SS | Ford Mustang | GM 6.2 L LS3 | |
| MARC GT | Chevrolet Camaro | GM 6.2 L LS3 | |
| MARC IRC Model A | Aston Martin DB9 | GM 6.2 L LS3 | |
