= California 8 Hours =

Auto race

Intercontinental GT Challenge
- Venue: WeatherTech Raceway Laguna Seca
- First race: 2017
- Last race: 2019
- Duration: 8 Hours
- Most wins (driver): Kelvin van der Linde (2)
- Most wins (manufacturer): Audi (2)

The California 8 Hours was a sports car endurance race held at WeatherTech Raceway Laguna Seca in Monterey, California, United States from 2017 to 2019 as part of the Intercontinental GT Challenge.

The inaugural edition was open to GT3 and GT4 cars. TCR Touring Cars were added for 2018.

For the first two years, the California 8 Hours served as the season finale of the Intercontinental GT Challenge. In 2019, the date was brought forward to fill the second race of the season. The event was replaced as the American leg of IGTC by the newly created Indianapolis 8 Hours event at Indianapolis Motor Speedway in the 2020 Intercontinental GT Challenge.

Over the three editions of the event, it was broadcast in part on television by CBS Sports Network, and streamed live across the internet.

== Winners ==
Year	Drivers	Vehicle	Entrant	Laps	Ref
2017	(Germany) Pierre Kaffer (South Africa) Kelvin van der Linde (Germany) Markus Winkelhock	Audi R8 LMS	(United States) Audi Sport Team Magnus	314	
2018	(Germany) Christopher Haase (South Africa) Kelvin van der Linde (Germany) Christopher Mies	Audi R8 LMS	(Germany) Audi Sport Team Land	306	
2019	(Australia) Nick Foster (Spain) Miguel Molina (Australia) Tim Slade	Ferrari 488 GT3	(Taiwan) HubAuto Corsa	327	

== Multiple winners ==
=== By driver ===
Wins	Driver	Years
2	(South Africa) Kelvin van der Linde	2017, 2018

=== By manufacturer ===
Wins	Manufacturer	Years
2	(Germany) Audi	2017, 2018

== See also ==
- Intercontinental GT Challenge
