= 2021 Indianapolis 8 Hours =

(United States) 2021 Indianapolis 8 Hours
Event Information
- Round 2 of 3 in the 2021 Intercontinental GT Challenge
- Date: 17 October 2021 Intercontinental GT Challenge
- Location: Speedway, Indiana, United States
- Venue: Indianapolis Motor Speedway

Results
Race 1
Distance	265 laps	636.88 miles (1,024.96 km) km
Pole position	(Italy) No. 51 AF Corse (driver for session: Alessandro Pier Guidi); AF Corse - Francorchamps Motors	1:33.456
Winner	(Germany) Christopher Haase (Switzerland) Patric Niederhauser (Germany) Markus Winkelhock (France) Audi Sport Team Saintéloc	8:00:59.768

The 2021 Indianapolis 8 Hours was an endurance race held on 17 October 2021 at the Indianapolis Motor Speedway in Speedway, in Indiana, United States. The event was open to cars in GT classes, namely GT3 and GT4. It was the second running of the Indianapolis 8 Hour. It was also the second leg of the 2021 Intercontinental GT Challenge and the seventh and final race of the 2021 GT World Challenge America. The GT World Challenge America results were determined by the race results after three hours instead of the full eight hours.

The race was run on the SCCA Runoffs layout, not the INDYCAR Grand Prix layout as was done the previous year, as it was made necessary as a result of kerbing damage in the Turn 5-6 chicane during the Verizon 200 NASCAR-INDYCAR meeting. The Runoffs course utilised the old Formula One course with the newer Snake Pit section.

== Class structure ==
Cars competed in the following two GT classes.

- GT3 Cars
- GT4 Cars

== Entry list ==
No.	Entrant	Car	Class	Driver 1	Driver 2	Driver 3
Group GT3 (28 entries)
04	(United States) CrowdStrike/ DXDT Racing	Mercedes-AMG GT3 Evo	PA	(United States) Colin Braun	(United States) Ben Keating	(United States) George Kurtz
3	(United States) K-Pax Racing	Lamborghini Huracán GT3 Evo	P	(Italy) Mirko Bortolotti	(Italy) Andrea Caldarelli	(South Africa) Jordan Pepper
6	(United States) K-Pax Racing	Lamborghini Huracán GT3 Evo	P	(United States) Corey Lewis	(Italy) Marco Mapelli	(Italy) Giovanni Venturini
10	(United States) TR3 Racing	Lamborghini Huracán GT3 Evo	PA	(Italy) Giacomo Altoè	(United States) John Megrue	(United States) Bill Sweedler
12	(United States) Ian Lacy Racing with G3 Racing	Aston Martin Vantage AMR GT3	PA	(United States) Frank Gannett	(United States) Ian Lacy	(United States) Drew Staveley
16	(Malaysia) EBM Giga Racing	Porsche 911 GT3 R	PA	(United States) Nick Boulle	(Malaysia) Adrian D'Silva	(Canada) Jeffrey Kingsley
19	(United States) CrowdStrike/ DXDT Racing	Mercedes-AMG GT3 Evo	PA	(United States) Michael Cooper	(United States) Thomas Merrill	(United States) Erin Vogel
20	(United States) Wright Motorsports	Porsche 911 GT3 R	S	(Belgium) Jan Heylen	(United States) Fred Poordad	(United States) Max Root
25	(France) Audi Sport Team Saintéloc	Audi R8 LMS Evo	P	(Germany) Christopher Haase	(Switzerland) Patric Niederhauser	(Germany) Markus Winkelhock
26	(France) Saintéloc Racing	Audi R8 LMS Evo	S	(Belgium) Nicolas Baert	(Switzerland) Lucas Légeret	(France) Aurélien Panis
32	(Belgium) Audi Sport Team WRT	Audi R8 LMS Evo	P	(Germany) Christopher Mies	(Belgium) Dries Vanthoor	(Belgium) Charles Weerts
33	(United States) Winward Racing	Mercedes-AMG GT3 Evo	S	(Germany) Marvin Dienst	(United Kingdom) Philip Ellis	(United States) Russell Ward
34	(United States) GMG Racing	Porsche 911 GT3 R	PA	(Norway) Dennis Olsen	(United States) James Sofronas	(United States) Kyle Washington
37	(Belgium) Audi Sport Team WRT	Audi R8 LMS Evo	P	(Italy) Mattia Drudi	(Netherlands) Robin Frijns	(Switzerland) Nico Müller
51	(Italy) AF Corse - Francorchamps Motors	Ferrari 488 GT3 Evo 2020	P	(France) Côme Ledogar	(Denmark) Nicklas Nielsen	(Italy) Alessandro Pier Guidi
59	(United States) Crucial Motorsports	McLaren 720S GT3	P	(United Kingdom) Ben Barnicoat	(United Kingdom) Robert Bell	(United States) Paul Holton
61	(Italy) AF Corse	Ferrari 488 GT3 Evo 2020	Am	(United States) Conrad Grunewald	(United States) Mark Kvamme	(United States) Jean-Claude Saada
63	(United States) CrowdStrike/ DXDT Racing	Mercedes-AMG GT3 Evo	PA	(United States) David Askew	(United Kingdom) Ryan Dalziel	(United States) Scott Smithson
70	(United Kingdom) Inception Racing with Optimum Motorsport	McLaren 720S GT3	PA	(United States) Brendan Iribe	(United States) Kevin Madsen	(United Kingdom) Ollie Millroy
71	(Italy) AF Corse - Francorchamps Motors	Ferrari 488 GT3 Evo 2020	P	(Italy) Antonio Fuoco	(United Kingdom) Callum Ilott	(Italy) Davide Rigon
75	(Australia) SunEnergy1 Racing	Mercedes-AMG GT3 Evo	PA	(Canada) Mikaël Grenier	(Australia) Kenny Habul	(Austria) Martin Konrad
77	(Canada) Richard Mille - Compass Racing	Acura NSX GT3 Evo	S	(Germany) Mario Farnbacher	(United States) Ashton Harrison	(United States) Matt McMurry
88	(United States) Zelus Motorsports	Lamborghini Huracán GT3 Evo	PA	(United States) Jason Harward	(United States) Madison Snow	TBA
89	(France) Mercedes-AMG Team AKKA ASP	Mercedes-AMG GT3 Evo	P	(Russia) Timur Boguslavskiy	(Spain) Daniel Juncadella	(Italy) Raffaele Marciello
91	(United States) Rearden Racing	Lamborghini Huracán GT3 Evo	PA	(United States) Jeff Burton	(Bulgaria) Vesko Kozarov	TBA
93	(United States) Racers Edge Motorsports	Acura NSX GT3 Evo	S	(United States) Jacob Abel	(United States) Dakota Dickerson	(United States) Taylor Hagler
96	(United States) Turner Motorsport	BMW M6 GT3	P	(United States) Connor De Phillippi	(United States) Michael Dinan	(United States) Robby Foley
99	(Hong Kong) Mercedes-AMG Team Craft-Bamboo Racing	Mercedes-AMG GT3 Evo	P	(Germany) Maro Engel	(France) Jules Gounon	(Germany) Luca Stolz
Group GT4 (13 entries)
09	(United States) Automatic Racing	Aston Martin Vantage AMR GT4	Am	(United States) Jonathan Branam	(United States) Paul Kiebler	(United States) Mikel Miller
2	(United States) GMG Racing	Aston Martin Vantage AMR GT4	PA	(United States) Jason Bell	(United States) Andrew Davis	(United States) Trent Hindman
7	(United States) Nolasport with OGH	Porsche 718 Cayman GT4 Clubsport	Am	(United States) Sean Gibbons	(United Kingdom) Pippa Mann	(United States) Sam Owens
8	(United States) GMG Racing	Audi R8 LMS GT4 Evo	PA	(United States) Andy Lee	(United States) Joel Miller	(United States) Elias Sabo
36	(United States) Bimmerworld Racing	BMW M4 GT4	S	(United States) Bill Auberlen	(United States) James Clay	(United States) Chandler Hull
47	(United States) Nolasport	Porsche 718 Cayman GT4 Clubsport	PA	(United States) Jason Hart	(United Kingdom) Colin Noble	(United States) Matt Travis
54	(United States) Black Swan Racing	Porsche 718 Cayman GT4 Clubsport	PA	(Netherlands) Jeroen Bleekemolen	(Netherlands) Sebastiaan Bleekemolen	(United States) Tim Pappas
66	(United States) TRG - The Racers Group	Porsche 718 Cayman GT4 Clubsport	PA	(United States) Derek DeBoer	(United States) Andy Lally	(United States) Spencer Pumpelly
68	(United States) TGR Smooge Racing	Toyota GR Supra GT4	Am	(United States) Kevin Conway	(United States) John Geesbreght	(United Kingdom) Jack Hawksworth
82	(United States) Bimmerworld Racing	BMW M4 GT4	S	(United States) Nick Galante	(United States) Devin Jones	(United States) James Walker
98	(United States) Random Vandals Racing	BMW M4 GT4	PA	(United States) Al Carter	(United States) Conor Daly	(United States) Paul Sparta
111	(United States) Classic BMW	BMW M4 GT4	S	(United States) John Capestro-DuBets	(Canada) Alex Filsinger	(United States) Dominic Starkweather
119	(United States) Stephen Cameron Racing	BMW M4 GT4	PA	(United States) Guy Cosmo	(United States) Tom Dyer	(Australia) Sean Quinlan

Icon	Class
P	Pro Cup
S	Silver Cup
PA	Pro/Am Cup
Am	Am Cup

== Qualifying ==
=== Qualifying results ===
Pole positions in each class are denoted in bold.

Final qualifying classification
Pos.	Class	No.	Team	Qualifying	Pole Shootout	Grid
**1**	**GT3 Pro**	**51**	(Italy) **AF Corse - Francorchamps Motors**	1:34.916	**1:33.456**	1
2	GT3 Pro	25	(France) Audi Sport Team Saintéloc	1:34.728	1:33.514	2
3	GT3 Pro	99	(Hong Kong) Mercedes-AMG Team Craft-Bamboo Racing	**1:34.444**	1:33.515	3
4	GT3 Pro	71	(Italy) AF Corse - Francorchamps Motors	1:34.706	1:33.556	4
5	GT3 Pro	32	(Belgium) Audi Sport Team WRT	1:34.826	1:33.817	5
6	GT3 Pro	37	(Belgium) Audi Sport Team WRT	1:34.562	1:33.845	6
**7**	**GT3 Silver**	**33**	(United States) **Winward Racing**	1:35.168	1:34.013	7
8	GT3 Pro	89	(France) Mercedes-AMG Team AKKA ASP	1:34.942	1:34.130	8
9	GT3 Silver	20	(United States) Wright Motorsports	1:35.885	1:34.197	9
**10**	**GT3 Pro/Am**	**75**	(Australia) **SunEnergy1 Racing**	1:35.791	1:34.232	10
11	GT3 Pro	3	(United States) K-Pax Racing	1:34.641	1:34.376	11
12	GT3 Silver	26	(France) Saintéloc Racing	1:35.503	1:34.418	12
13	GT3 Silver	93	(United States) Racers Edge Motorsports	1:35.775	1:34.456	13
14	GT3 Pro	6	(United States) K-Pax Racing	1:35.664	1:34.903	14
15	GT3 Pro	59	(United States) Crucial Motorsports	1:34.730	No Time	15
16	GT3 Silver	77	(Canada) Richard Mille - Compass Racing	1:36.045		16
17	GT3 Pro/Am	70	(United Kingdom) Inception Racing with Optimum Motorsport	1:36.152		17
18	GT3 Pro/Am	19	(United States) CrowdStrike/ DXDT Racing	1:36.395		18
19	GT3 Pro/Am	34	(United States) GMG Racing	1:36.523		19
20	GT3 Pro/Am	88	(United States) Zelus Motorsports	1:36.764		20
21	GT3 Pro/Am	04	(United States) CrowdStrike/ DXDT Racing	1:37.044		21
22	GT3 Pro/Am	63	(United States) CrowdStrike/ DXDT Racing	1:37.199		22
23	GT3 Pro/Am	10	(United States) TR3 Racing	1:37.218		23
24	GT3 Pro/Am	91	(United States) Rearden Racing	1:37.429		24
**25**	**GT3 Am**	**61**	(Italy) **AF Corse**	1:37.537		25
26	GT3 Pro/Am	16	(Malaysia) EBM Giga Racing	1:41.637		26
**27**	**GT4 Am**	**68**	(United States) **TGR Smooge Racing**	1:43.069		39 (Note: The No. 68 Smooge Racing Toyota GR Supra GT4 has been stripped of its GT4 class pole following a overboost issue in Qualifying.)
**28**	**GT4 Pro/Am**	**2**	(United States) **GMG Racing**	1:43.516		27
**29**	**GT4 Silver**	**36**	(United States) **Bimmerworld Racing**	1:43.748		28
30	GT4 Pro/Am	119	(United States) Stephen Cameron Racing	1:44.093		29
31	GT4 Silver	82	(United States) Bimmerworld Racing	1:44.240		30
32	GT4 Pro/Am	47	(United States) Nolasport	1:44.252		31
33	GT4 Pro/Am	8	(United States) GMG Racing	1:44.414		32
34	GT4 Pro/Am	98	(United States) Random Vandals Racing	1:44.649		33
35	GT4 Silver	111	(United States) Classic BMW	1:44.651		34
36	GT4 Pro/Am	66	(United States) TRG - The Racers Group	1:44.740		35
37	GT4 Pro/Am	54	(United States) Black Swan Racing	1:44.859		36
38	GT4 Am	7	(United States) Nolasport with OGH	1:46.189		37
39	GT4 Am	09	(United States) Automatic Racing	1:44.608		38
40	GT3 Pro	96	(United States) Turner Motorsport	No Time		WD (Note: The No. 96 Turner Motorsport BMW M6 GT3 was withdrawn following Michael Dinan's sickness in pre-qualifying.)
41	GT3 Pro/Am	12	(United States) Ian Lacy Racing with G3 Racing	No Time		WD (Note: The No. 12 Ian Lacy Racing with G3 Racing Aston Martin Vantage AMR GT3 was withdrawn following Frank Gannett's crash in Friday's Bronze Test Session.)

== Race Result ==
Class winners denoted with bold and ‡.

Pos.	Class	No.	Team / Entrant	Drivers	Car	Laps	Time/Retired
1	GT3 Pro	25	(France) Audi Sport Team Saintéloc	(Germany) Christopher Haase (Switzerland) Patric Niederhauser (Germany) Markus Winkelhock	Audi R8 LMS Evo	265	8:00:59.768‡
2	GT3 Pro	89	(France) Mercedes-AMG Team AKKA ASP	(Russia) Timur Boguslavskiy (Spain) Daniel Juncadella (Italy) Raffaele Marciello	Mercedes-AMG GT3 Evo	265	+11.958
3	GT3 Pro	3	(United States) K-Pax Racing	(Italy) Mirko Bortolotti (Italy) Andrea Caldarelli (South Africa) Jordan Pepper	Lamborghini Huracán GT3 Evo	265	+22.853
4	GT3 Pro	51	(Italy) AF Corse - Francorchamps Motors	(France) Côme Ledogar (Denmark) Nicklas Nielsen (Italy) Alessandro Pier Guidi	Ferrari 488 GT3 Evo 2020	265	+49.508
5	GT3 Pro	32	(Belgium) Audi Sport Team WRT	(Germany) Christopher Mies (Belgium) Dries Vanthoor (Belgium) Charles Weerts	Audi R8 LMS Evo	265	+51.655
6	GT3 Silver	77	(Canada) Richard Mille - Compass Racing	(Germany) Mario Farnbacher (United States) Ashton Harrison (United States) Matt McMurry	Acura NSX GT3 Evo	265	+59.815‡
7	GT3 Silver	26	(France) Saintéloc Racing	(Belgium) Nicolas Baert (Switzerland) Lucas Légeret (France) Aurélien Panis	Audi R8 LMS Evo	265	+1:23.937
8	GT3 Silver	93	(United States) Racers Edge Motorsports	(United States) Jacob Abel (United States) Dakota Dickerson (United States) Taylor Hagler	Acura NSX GT3 Evo	264	+1 Lap
9	GT3 Pro	6	(United States) K-Pax Racing	(United States) Corey Lewis (Italy) Marco Mapelli (Italy) Giovanni Venturini	Lamborghini Huracán GT3 Evo	264	+1 Lap
10	GT3 Pro-Am	75	(Australia) SunEnergy1 Racing	(Canada) Mikaël Grenier (Australia) Kenny Habul (Austria) Martin Konrad	Mercedes-AMG GT3 Evo	261	+4 Laps‡
11	GT3 Pro-Am	34	(United States) GMG Racing	(Norway) Dennis Olsen (United States) James Sofronas (United States) Kyle Washington	Porsche 911 GT3 R	261	+4 Laps
12	GT3 Pro	37	(Belgium) Audi Sport Team WRT	(Italy) Mattia Drudi (Netherlands) Robin Frijns (Switzerland) Nico Müller	Audi R8 LMS Evo	261	+4 Laps
13	GT3 Pro-Am	10	(United States) TR3 Racing	(Italy) Giacomo Altoè (United States) John Megrue (United States) Bill Sweedler	Lamborghini Huracán GT3 Evo	259	+6 Laps
14	GT3 Pro-Am	63	(United States) CrowdStrike/DXDT Racing	(United States) David Askew (United Kingdom) Ryan Dalziel (United States) Scott Smithson	Mercedes-AMG GT3 Evo	256	+9 Laps
15	GT3 Pro-Am	70	(United Kingdom) Inception Racing with Optimum Motorsport	(United States) Brendan Iribe (United States) Kevin Madsen (United Kingdom) Ollie Millroy	McLaren 720S GT3	255	+10 Laps
16	GT3 Am	61	(Italy) AF Corse	(United States) Conrad Grunewald (United States) Mark Kvamme (United States) Jean-Claude Saada	Ferrari 488 GT3 Evo 2020	254	+11 Laps‡
17	GT4 Silver	36	(United States) Bimmerworld Racing	(United States) Bill Auberlen (United States) James Clay (United States) Chandler Hull	BMW M4 GT4	247	+18 Laps‡
18	GT4 Pro-Am	119	(United States) Stephen Cameron Racing	(United States) Guy Cosmo (United States) Tom Dyer (Australia) Sean Quinlan	BMW M4 GT4	247	+18 Laps‡
19	GT4 Pro-Am	54	(United States) Black Swan Racing	(Netherlands) Jeroen Bleekemolen (Netherlands) Sebastiaan Bleekemolen (United States) Tim Pappas	Porsche 718 Cayman GT4 Clubsport	247	+18 Laps
20	GT4 Silver	82	(United States) Bimmerworld Racing	(United States) Nick Galante (United States) Devin Jones (United States) James Walker	BMW M4 GT4	246	+19 Laps
21	GT4 Pro-Am	66	(United States) TRG - The Racer's Group	(United States) Derek DeBoer (United States) Andy Lally (United States) Spencer Pumpelly	Porsche 718 Cayman GT4 Clubsport	246	+19 Laps
22	GT4 Pro-Am	8	(United States) GMG Racing	(United States) Andy Lee (United States) Joel Miller (United States) Elias Sabo	Audi R8 LMS GT4 Evo	244	+21 Laps
23	GT4 Silver	111	(United States) Classic BMW	(United States) John Capestro-DuBets (Canada) Alex Filsinger (United States) Dominic Starkweather	BMW M4 GT4	223	+42 Laps
24	GT3 Pro-Am	04	(United States) CrowdStrike/DXDT Racing	(United States) Colin Braun (United States) Ben Keating (United States) George Kurtz	Mercedes-AMG GT3 Evo	212	+53 Laps
25	GT4 Am	09	(United States) Automatic Racing	(United States) Jonathan Branam (United States) Paul Kiebler (United States) Mikel Miller	Aston Martin Vantage AMR GT4	212	+53 Laps‡
26	GT4 Am	7	(United States) Nolasport with OGH	(United States) Sean Gibbons (United Kingdom) Pippa Mann (United States) Sam Owens	Porsche 718 Cayman GT4 Clubsport	200	+65 Laps
27	GT4 Pro-Am	47	(United States) Nolasport	(United States) Jason Hart (United Kingdom) Colin Noble (United States) Matt Travis	Porsche 718 Cayman GT4 Clubsport	196	+69 Laps
NC	GT3 Pro	99	(Hong Kong) Mercedes-AMG Team Craft-Bamboo Racing	(Germany) Maro Engel (France) Jules Gounon (Germany) Luca Stolz	Mercedes-AMG GT3 Evo	243	Retired
NC	GT3 Pro	59	(United States) Crucial Motorsports	(United Kingdom) Ben Barnicoat (United Kingdom) Robert Bell (United States) Paul Holton	McLaren 720S GT3	242	Retired
NC	GT3 Pro	71	(Italy) AF Corse - Francorchamps Motors	(Italy) Antonio Fuoco (United Kingdom) Callum Ilott (Italy) Davide Rigon	Ferrari 488 GT3 Evo 2020	237	Retired
NC	GT4 Pro-Am	98	(United States) Random Vandals Racing	(United States) Al Carter (United States) Conor Daly (United States) Paul Sparta	BMW M4 GT4	169	Retired
NC	GT3 Pro-Am	16	(Malaysia) EBM Giga Racing	(United States) Nick Boulle (Malaysia) Adrian D'Silva (Canada) Jeffery Kingsley	Porsche 911 GT3 R	144	Retired
NC	GT3 Silver	20	(United States) Wright Motorsports	(Belgium) Jan Heylen (United States) Fred Poordad (United States) Max Root	Porsche 911 GT3 R	144	Retired
NC	GT4 Pro-Am	2	(United States) GMG Racing	(United States) Jason Bell (United States) Andrew Davis (United States) Trent Hindman	Aston Martin Vantage AMR GT4	134	Retired
NC	GT4 Am	68	(United States) TGR Smooge Racing	(United States) Kevin Conway (United States) John Geesbreght (United Kingdom) Jack Hawksworth	Toyota GR Supra GT4	120	Retired
NC	GT3 Pro-Am	91	(United States) Rearden Racing	(United States) Jeff Burton (Bulgaria) Vesko Kozarov	Lamborghini Huracán GT3 Evo	103	Retired
NC	GT3 Pro-Am	19	(United States) CrowdStrike/DXDT Racing	(United States) Michael Cooper (United States) Thomas Merrill (United States) Erin Vogel	Mercedes-AMG GT3 Evo	62	Retired
NC	GT3 Silver	33	(United States) Winward Racing	(Germany) Marvin Dienst (United Kingdom) Philip Ellis (United States) Russell Ward	Mercedes-AMG GT3 Evo	62	Retired
NC	GT3 Pro-Am	88	(United States) Zelus Motorsports	(United States) Jason Harward (United States) Madison Snow	Lamborghini Huracán GT3 Evo	100	Retired
Results

Intercontinental GT Challenge
Previous race: 2021 24 Hours of Spa	2021 season	Next race: 2021 Kyalami 9 Hours
