= 2021 Kyalami 9 Hours =

Endurance motorsport race, held February 2022

(South Africa) 2021 Kyalami 9 Hours
Event Information
- Round 3 of 3 in the 2021 Intercontinental GT Challenge
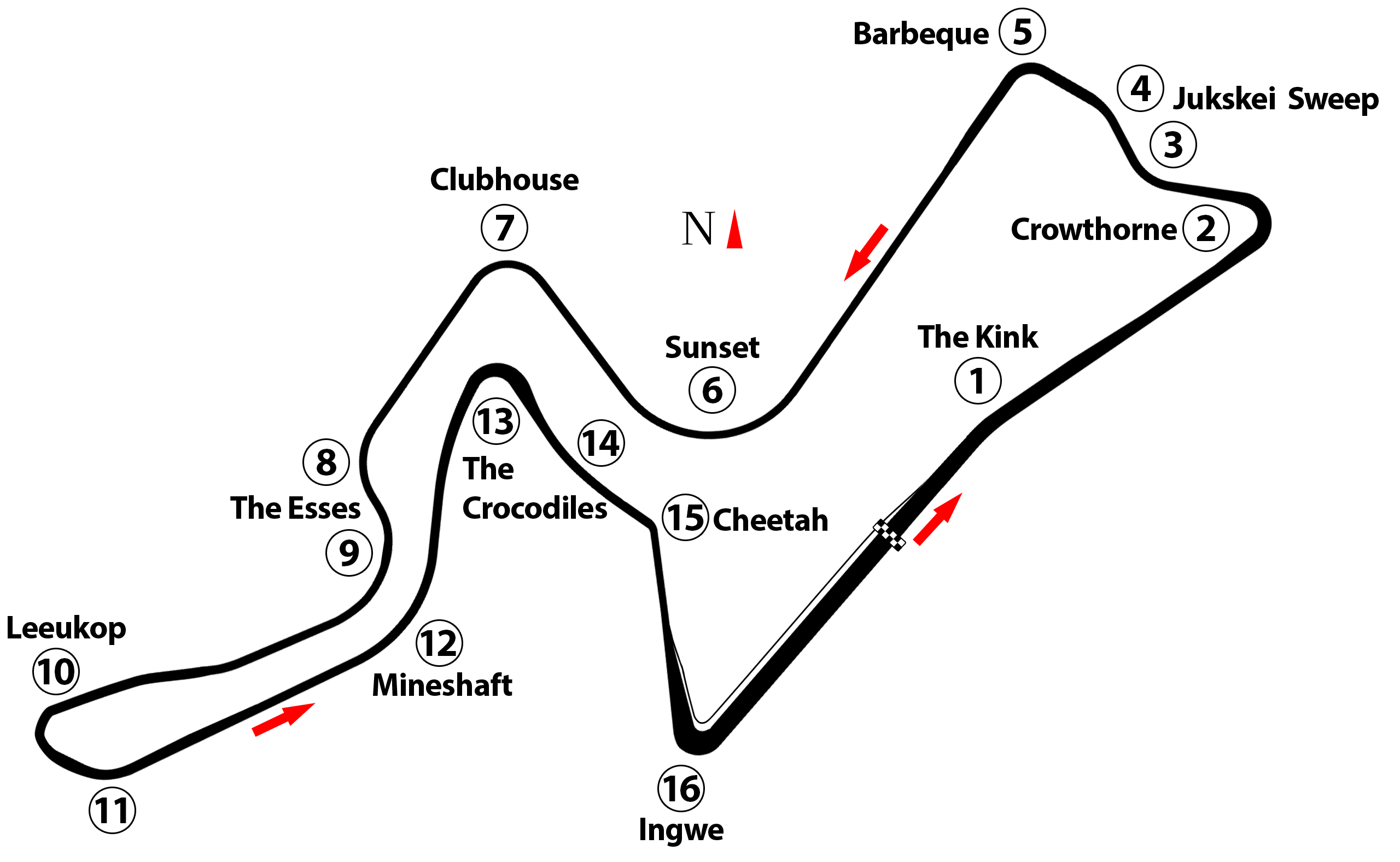
- Date: 3-5 February 2022 2021 Intercontinental GT Challenge
- Location: Midrand, Gauteng, South Africa
- Venue: Kyalami Grand Prix Circuit

Results
Race 1
Distance	307 laps	1.390,403 km
Winner	(Russia) Timur Boguslavskiy (France) Jules Gounon (Italy) Raffaele Marciello; AKKA ASP Team	9:01:17.933

The 2021 Kyalami 9 Hours was an endurance event that took place on 5 February 2022 at the Kyalami Grand Prix Circuit in Midrand, South Africa. The event was the third and final round of the 2021 Intercontinental GT Challenge. Initially it was to be held on 2-4 December, but it was postponed due to SARS-CoV-2 Omicron variant cases in South Africa and rescheduled to 3-5 February 2022.

== Entry list ==
Team	Vehicle	Engine	No	Driver	Class
(South Africa) MJR Motorsport	Audi R8 LMS GT4 Evo	Audi 5.2 L V10	80	(South Africa) Marius Jackson	Nat
(South Africa) MJR Motorsport	Audi R8 LMS GT4 Evo	Audi 5.2 L V10	80	(South Africa) Mo Mia	Nat
(South Africa) MJR Motorsport	Audi R8 LMS GT4 Evo	Audi 5.2 L V10	80	(South Africa) Mikaeel Pitamber	Nat
(South Africa) Stradale Into Africa	Lamborghini Huracán GT3 Evo	Lamborghini 5.2 L V10	23	(South Africa) Philip Kekana	Nat
(South Africa) Stradale Into Africa	Lamborghini Huracán GT3 Evo	Lamborghini 5.2 L V10	23	(South Africa) Xolile Letlaka	Nat
(South Africa) Stradale Into Africa	Lamborghini Huracán GT3 Evo	Lamborghini 5.2 L V10	23	(South Africa) Tschops Sipuka	Nat
(France) Saintéloc Racing	Audi R8 LMS Evo	Audi 5.2 L V10	25	(South Africa) Kelvin van der Linde	P
(France) Saintéloc Racing	Audi R8 LMS Evo	Audi 5.2 L V10	25	(Germany) Markus Winkelhock	P
(France) Saintéloc Racing	Audi R8 LMS Evo	Audi 5.2 L V10	25	(Switzerland) Patric Niederhauser	P
(France) Saintéloc Racing	Audi R8 LMS Evo	Audi 5.2 L V10	26	(Belgium) Nicolas Baert	S
(France) Saintéloc Racing	Audi R8 LMS Evo	Audi 5.2 L V10	26	(France) Simon Gachet	S
(France) Saintéloc Racing	Audi R8 LMS Evo	Audi 5.2 L V10	26	(Switzerland) Lucas Légeret	S
(Belgium) Belgian Audi Club Team WRT	Audi R8 LMS Evo	Audi 5.2 L V10	32	(Italy) Mattia Drudi	P
(Belgium) Belgian Audi Club Team WRT	Audi R8 LMS Evo	Audi 5.2 L V10	32	(Germany) Christopher Haase	P
(Belgium) Belgian Audi Club Team WRT	Audi R8 LMS Evo	Audi 5.2 L V10	32	(Belgium) Charles Weerts	P
(Denmark) High Class Racing with WRT	Audi R8 LMS Evo	Audi 5.2 L V10	33	(Netherlands) Thierry Vermeulen	PA
(Denmark) High Class Racing with WRT	Audi R8 LMS Evo	Audi 5.2 L V10	33	(Denmark) Michael Markussen	PA
(Denmark) High Class Racing with WRT	Audi R8 LMS Evo	Audi 5.2 L V10	33	(United States) Mark Patterson	PA
(South Africa) Stradale Motorsport	Lamborghini Huracán GT3 Evo	Lamborghini 5.2 L V10	86	(South Africa) Charl Arangies	Nat
(South Africa) Stradale Motorsport	Lamborghini Huracán GT3 Evo	Lamborghini 5.2 L V10	86	(South Africa) Arnold Neveling	Nat
(South Africa) Stradale Motorsport	Lamborghini Huracán GT3 Evo	Lamborghini 5.2 L V10	86	(South Africa) Michael van Rooyen	Nat
(Italy) AF Corse - Francorchamps Motors	Ferrari 488 GT3 Evo 2020	Ferrari F154CB 3.9 L Turbo V8	51	(Italy) Alessandro Pier Guidi	P
(Italy) AF Corse - Francorchamps Motors	Ferrari 488 GT3 Evo 2020	Ferrari F154CB 3.9 L Turbo V8	51	(France) Côme Ledogar	P
(Italy) AF Corse - Francorchamps Motors	Ferrari 488 GT3 Evo 2020	Ferrari F154CB 3.9 L Turbo V8	51	(Spain) Miguel Molina	P
(Italy) AF Corse - Francorchamps Motors	Ferrari 488 GT3 Evo 2020	Ferrari F154CB 3.9 L Turbo V8	71	(Italy) Antonio Fuoco	P
(Italy) AF Corse - Francorchamps Motors	Ferrari 488 GT3 Evo 2020	Ferrari F154CB 3.9 L Turbo V8	71	(Denmark) Nicklas Nielsen	P
(Italy) AF Corse - Francorchamps Motors	Ferrari 488 GT3 Evo 2020	Ferrari F154CB 3.9 L Turbo V8	71	(Italy) Alessio Rovera	P
(Australia) SunEnergy1 Racing	Mercedes-AMG GT3 Evo	Mercedes-AMG M159 6.2 L V8	75	(Canada) Mikaël Grenier	PA
(Australia) SunEnergy1 Racing	Mercedes-AMG GT3 Evo	Mercedes-AMG M159 6.2 L V8	75	(Australia) Kenny Habul	PA
(Australia) SunEnergy1 Racing	Mercedes-AMG GT3 Evo	Mercedes-AMG M159 6.2 L V8	75	(Austria) Martin Konrad	PA
(France) AKKA ASP Team	Mercedes-AMG GT3 Evo	Mercedes-AMG M159 6.2 L V8	89	(France) Jules Gounon	P
(France) AKKA ASP Team	Mercedes-AMG GT3 Evo	Mercedes-AMG M159 6.2 L V8	89	(Russia) Timur Boguslavskiy	P
(France) AKKA ASP Team	Mercedes-AMG GT3 Evo	Mercedes-AMG M159 6.2 L V8	89	(Italy) Raffaele Marciello	P

Teams
Icon	Class
P	Pro Cup
S	Silver Cup
PA	Pro-Am Cup
Nat	GT3 National Cup
Nat	GT4 National Cup

== Results ==
=== Qualifying ===
Fastest in class in bold.

Pos.	Class	No.	Team	Car	Time	Gap
1	**Pro**	**89**	**(France) AKKA ASP Team**	**Mercedes-AMG GT3 Evo**	**1:42.465**	—
2	Pro	71	(Italy) AF Corse - Francorchamps Motors	Ferrari 488 GT3 Evo 2020	1:42.914	+0.449
3	Pro	51	(Italy) AF Corse - Francorchamps Motors	Ferrari 488 GT3 Evo 2020	1:43.109	+0.644
4	**Pro-Am**	**75**	**(Australia) SunEnergy1 Racing**	**Mercedes-AMG GT3 Evo**	**1:43.331**	**+0.866**
5	Pro	25	(France) Saintéloc Racing	Audi R8 LMS Evo	1:43.459	+0.994
6	Pro	32	(Belgium) Belgian Audi Club Team WRT	Audi R8 LMS Evo	1:43.472	+1.007
7	**Silver**	**26**	**(France) Saintéloc Racing**	**Audi R8 LMS Evo**	**1:43.864**	**+1.399**
8	Pro-Am	33	(Denmark) High Class Racing with WRT	Audi R8 LMS Evo	1:44.133	+1.668
9	**Nat GT3**	**86**	**(South Africa) Stradale Motorsport**	**Lamborghini Huracán GT3 Evo**	**1:46.289**	**+3.824**
10	Nat GT3	17	(South Africa) MJR Motorsport	Audi R8 LMS Evo	1:47.101	+4.636
11	**Nat GT4**	**80**	**(South Africa) MJR Motorsport**	**Audi R8 LMS GT4 Evo**	**1:55.163**	**+12.698**
12	Nat GT3	23	(South Africa) Stradale Into Africa	Lamborghini Huracán GT3 Evo	2:08.383	+25.918

=== Race ===
Class winner in bold.

Pos.	Class	No.	Team	Drivers	Car	Laps	Time/Gap
1	**Pro**	**89**	**(France) AKKA ASP Team**	**(France) Jules Gounon** **(Russia) Timur Boguslavskiy** **(Italy) Raffaele Marciello**	**Mercedes-AMG GT3 Evo**	**307**	**9:01:17.933**
2	Pro	51	(Italy) AF Corse - Francorchamps Motors	(Italy) Alessandro Pier Guidi (France) Côme Ledogar (Spain) Miguel Molina	Ferrari 488 GT3 Evo 2020	307	+15.668
3	Pro	25	(France) Saintéloc Racing	(South Africa) Kelvin van der Linde (Germany) Markus Winkelhock (Switzerland) Patric Niederhauser	Audi R8 LMS Evo	307	+42.083
4	Pro	32	(Belgium) Belgian Audi Club Team WRT	(Italy) Mattia Drudi (Germany) Christopher Haase (Belgium) Charles Weerts	Audi R8 LMS Evo	307	+47.133
5	**Silver**	**26**	**(France) Saintéloc Racing**	**(Belgium) Nicolas Baert** **(France) Simon Gachet** **(Switzerland) Lucas Légeret**	**Audi R8 LMS Evo**	**297**	**+10 Laps**
6	**Pro-Am**	**33**	**(Denmark) High Class Racing with WRT**	**(Netherlands) Thierry Vermeulen** **(Denmark) Michael Markussen** **(United States) Mark Patterson**	**Audi R8 LMS Evo**	**296**	**+11 Laps**
7	Pro-Am	75	(Australia) SunEnergy1 Racing	(Canada) Mikaël Grenier (Australia) Kenny Habul (Austria) Martin Konrad	Mercedes-AMG GT3 Evo	289	+18 Laps
8	**Nat GT3**	**86**	**(South Africa) Stradale Motorsport**	**(South Africa) Charl Arangies** **(South Africa) Arnold Neveling** **(South Africa) Michael van Rooyen**	**Lamborghini Huracán GT3 Evo**	**278**	**+29 Laps**
9	Nat GT3	23	(South Africa) Stradale Into Africa	(South Africa) Philip Kekana (South Africa) Xolile Letlaka (South Africa) Tschops Sipuka	Lamborghini Huracán GT3 Evo	262	+45 Laps
10	**Nat GT4**	**80**	**(South Africa) MJR Motorsport**	**(South Africa) Marius Jackson** **(South Africa) Mo Mia** **(South Africa) Mikaeel Pitamber**	**Audi R8 LMS GT4 Evo**	**220**	**+87 Laps**
NC	Pro	71	(Italy) AF Corse - Francorchamps Motors	(Italy) Antonio Fuoco (Denmark) Nicklas Nielsen (Italy) Alessio Rovera	Ferrari 488 GT3 Evo 2020	118	+189 Laps

Intercontinental GT Challenge
Previous race: 2021 Indianapolis 8 Hours	2021 season	Next race: 2022 Bathurst 12 Hour
