= 2021 24 Hours of Spa =

74th 24 Hours of Spa endurance race

(Belgium) 2021 24 Hours of Spa
Event Information
- Round 1 of 3 in the 2021 Intercontinental GT Challenge
- Date: 29 July–1 August 2021 Intercontinental GT Challenge
- Location: Spa-Francorchamps, Wallonia, Belgium
- Venue: Circuit de Spa-Francorchamps

Results
Race 1
Distance	556 laps	3894.224 km
Pole position	(Italy) Raffaele Marciello (France) AKKA ASP	2:17.949
Winner	(France) Côme Ledogar (Denmark) Nicklas Nielsen (Italy) Alessandro Pier Guidi (Italy) Iron Lynx	24:01:16.554

The 2021 24 Hours of Spa (also known as the TotalEnergies 24 Hours of Spa for sponsorship reasons) was the 74th running of the 24 Hours of Spa. It took place from 29 July–1 August 2021. The race was part of both the 2021 GT World Challenge Europe Endurance Cup and the 2021 Intercontinental GT Challenge.

== Background ==
After being delayed the previous year to October due to the COVID-19 pandemic in Belgium, the race returned to its traditional end of July date for 2021. Spectators were allowed for the race, but were restricted to two bubbles and were required to wear a mask at all times. Initial plans also would have required spectators to provide proof of vaccination or a negative test result for the COVID-19 virus, but this was scrapped days before the event.

Supporting the race weekend were the GT4 European Series, Lamborghini Super Trofeo, TCR Europe Championship, Renault Clio Cup Europe, and a new TC France series.

Prior to the race, Frikadelli Racing was forced to withdraw due to the impacts of the 2021 European floods. Their spot was taken over by Schnabl Engineering.

== Entry list ==
No.	Entrant	Car	Driver 1	Driver 2	Driver 3	Driver 4
Pro Cup (25 entries)
3	(Germany) Schnabl Engineering	Porsche 911 GT3 R	(Denmark) Michael Christensen	(France) Frédéric Makowiecki	(Norway) Dennis Olsen	
4	(Germany) BWT Haupt Racing Team	Mercedes-AMG GT3 Evo	(France) Vincent Abril	(Germany) Maro Engel	(Germany) Luca Stolz	
18	(Hong Kong) KCMG	Porsche 911 GT3 R	(Australia) Josh Burdon	(Switzerland) Alexandre Imperatori	(Italy) Edoardo Liberati	
21	(Germany) Rutronik Racing	Porsche 911 GT3 R	(France) Kévin Estre	(Austria) Richard Lietz	(Germany) Sven Müller	
22	(United Arab Emirates) GPX Martini Racing	Porsche 911 GT3 R	(New Zealand) Earl Bamber	(Australia) Matt Campbell	(France) Mathieu Jaminet	
25	(France) Audi Sport Team Saintéloc	Audi R8 LMS Evo	(Germany) Christopher Haase	(Switzerland) Patric Niederhauser	(Germany) Markus Winkelhock	
26	(France) Saintéloc Racing	Audi R8 LMS Evo	(United Kingdom) Jamie Green	(United Kingdom) Finlay Hutchison	(France) Adrien Tambay	
32	(Belgium) Audi Sport Team WRT	Audi R8 LMS Evo	(South Africa) Kelvin van der Linde	(Belgium) Dries Vanthoor	(Belgium) Charles Weerts	
34	(Germany) Walkenhorst Motorsport	BMW M6 GT3	(South Africa) Sheldon van der Linde	(United Kingdom) David Pittard	(Germany) Marco Wittmann	
35	(Germany) Walkenhorst Motorsport	BMW M6 GT3	(Germany) Timo Glock	(France) Thomas Neubauer	(Germany) Martin Tomczyk	
37	(Belgium) Audi Sport Team WRT	Audi R8 LMS Evo	(Netherlands) Robin Frijns	(Denmark) Dennis Lind	(Switzerland) Nico Müller	
38	(United Kingdom) Jota Sport	McLaren 720S GT3	(United Kingdom) Ben Barnicoat	(United Kingdom) Rob Bell	(United Kingdom) Ollie Wilkinson	
47	(Hong Kong) KCMG	Porsche 911 GT3 R	(Belgium) Maxime Martin	(United Kingdom) Nick Tandy	(Belgium) Laurens Vanthoor	
50	(Taiwan) HubAuto Racing	Mercedes-AMG GT3 Evo	(Germany) Maximilian Buhk	(Netherlands) Nicky Catsburg	(Germany) Maximilian Götz	
51	(Italy) Iron Lynx	Ferrari 488 GT3 Evo 2020	(Italy) Alessandro Pier Guidi	(France) Côme Ledogar	(Denmark) Nicklas Nielsen	
54	(Italy) Dinamic Motorsport	Porsche 911 GT3 R	(Austria) Klaus Bachler	(Italy) Matteo Cairoli	(Germany) Christian Engelhart	
56	(Italy) Dinamic Motorsport	Porsche 911 GT3 R	(France) Romain Dumas	(Denmark) Mikkel O. Pedersen	(Italy) Andrea Rizzoli	
63	(China) Orange 1 FFF Racing Team	Lamborghini Huracán GT3 Evo	(Italy) Mirko Bortolotti	(Italy) Andrea Caldarelli	(Italy) Marco Mapelli	
66	(Germany) Audi Sport Team Attempto	Audi R8 LMS Evo	(Italy) Mattia Drudi	(Germany) Christopher Mies	(Germany) Kim-Luis Schramm	
71	(Italy) Iron Lynx	Ferrari 488 GT3 Evo 2020	(Italy) Antonio Fuoco	(United Kingdom) Callum Ilott	(Italy) Davide Rigon	
88	(France) Mercedes-AMG Team AKKA ASP	Mercedes-AMG GT3 Evo	(France) Jules Gounon	(Italy) Raffaele Marciello	(Spain) Daniel Juncadella	
89	(France) AKKA ASP Team	Mercedes-AMG GT3 Evo	(Austria) Lucas Auer	(Russia) Timur Boguslavskiy	(Brazil) Felipe Fraga	
95	(United Kingdom) Garage 59 AMR	Aston Martin Vantage AMR GT3	(United Kingdom) Ross Gunn	(Denmark) Marco Sørensen	(Denmark) Nicki Thiim	
114	(Switzerland) Emil Frey Racing	Lamborghini Huracán GT3 Evo	(United Kingdom) Jack Aitken	(Finland) Konsta Lappalainen	(France) Arthur Rougier	
163	(Switzerland) Emil Frey Racing	Lamborghini Huracán GT3 Evo	(Italy) Giacomo Altoè	(Spain) Albert Costa	(France) Franck Perera	
Silver Cup (16 entries)
5	(Germany) Haupt Racing Team	Mercedes-AMG GT3 Evo	(Germany) Patrick Assenheimer	(Italy) Michele Beretta	(Netherlands) Indy Dontje	(Germany) Hubert Haupt
7	(Germany) Toksport WRT	Mercedes-AMG GT3 Evo	(Germany) Marvin Dienst	(Zimbabwe) Axcil Jefferies	(France) Paul Petit	(Colombia) Óscar Tunjo
14	(Switzerland) Emil Frey Racing	Lamborghini Huracán GT3 Evo	(Switzerland) Alex Fontana	(Switzerland) Ricardo Feller	(Switzerland) Rolf Ineichen	
16	(Austria) GRT Grasser Racing Team	Lamborghini Huracán GT3 Evo	(Italy) Alberto Di Folco	(Italy) Kikko Galbiati	(Austria) Clemens Schmid	(Germany) Tim Zimmermann
27	(France) Saintéloc Racing	Audi R8 LMS Evo	(France) Alexandre Cougnaud	(Switzerland) Lucas Légeret	(France) Aurélien Panis	(Monaco) Louis Prette
30	(United Kingdom) ROFGO Racing with Team WRT	Audi R8 LMS Evo	(Argentina) Franco Colapinto	(Germany) Benjamin Goethe	(United Kingdom) James Pull	
31	(Belgium) Belgian Audi Club Team WRT	Audi R8 LMS Evo	(Denmark) Valdemar Eriksen	(United Kingdom) Frank Bird	(Japan) Ryuichiro Tomita	
33	(Germany) Rinaldi Racing	Ferrari 488 GT3 Evo 2020	(Italy) Fabrizio Crestani	(Chile) Benjamin Hites	(South Africa) David Perel	
40	(Germany) SPS Automotive Performance	Mercedes-AMG GT3 Evo	(Germany) Lance David Arnold	(Switzerland) Miklas Born	(Australia) Jordan Love	(Switzerland) Yannick Mettler
57	(United States) Winward Motorsport	Mercedes-AMG GT3 Evo	(United Kingdom) Philip Ellis	(Canada) Mikaël Grenier	(United States) Russel Ward	
87	(France) AKKA ASP Team	Mercedes-AMG GT3 Evo	(France) Thomas Drouet	(France) Simon Gachet	(Russia) Konstantin Tereshchenko	(Romania) Petru Umbrărescu
90	(Argentina) Madpanda Motorsport	Mercedes-AMG GT3 Evo	(Netherlands) Rik Breukers	(Argentina) Ezequiel Pérez Companc	(Finland) Patrick Kujala	(Mexico) Ricardo Sanchez
99	(Germany) Attempto Racing	Audi R8 LMS Evo	(Germany) Alex Aka	(Austria) Max Hofer	(France) Fabien Lavergne	(Germany) Dennis Marschall
159	(United Kingdom) Garage 59	Aston Martin Vantage AMR GT3	(France) Valentin Hasse-Clot	(Denmark) Nicolai Kjærgaard	(United Kingdom) Alex MacDowall	
222	(Germany) Allied-Racing	Porsche 911 GT3 R	(Switzerland) Julien Apotheloz	(Denmark) Bastian Buus	(Germany) Lars Kern	(France) Arno Santamato
666	(Italy) Vincenzo Sospiri Racing	Lamborghini Huracán GT3 Evo	(Netherlands) Glenn van Berlo	(Belgium) Baptiste Moulin	(Japan) Yuki Nemoto	Martin Rump
Pro-Am Cup (15 entries)
2	(Germany) GetSpeed Performance	Mercedes-AMG GT3 Evo	(Germany) Nico Bastian	(Luxembourg) Olivier Grotz	(Germany) Florian Scholze	
10	(Belgium) Boutsen Ginion Racing	BMW M6 GT3	(Germany) Jens Klingmann	(Germany) Jens Liebhauser	(Saudi Arabia) Karim Ojjeh	(France) Yann Zimmer
11	(Switzerland) Kessel Racing	Ferrari 488 GT3 Evo 2020	(Italy) David Fumanelli	(Germany) Tim Kohmann	(Italy) Giorgio Roda	(Italy) Francesco Zollo
19	(China) Orange 1 FFF Racing Team	Lamborghini Huracán GT3 Evo	(Belgium) Bertrand Baguette	(Italy) Stefano Costantini	(Japan) Hiroshi Hamaguchi	(United Kingdom) Phil Keen
20	(Germany) SPS Automotive Performance	Mercedes-AMG GT3 Evo	(Austria) Dominik Baumann	(United States) Colin Braun	(United States) George Kurtz	(Germany) Valentin Pierburg
52	(Italy) AF Corse	Ferrari 488 GT3 Evo 2020	(Italy) Andrea Bertolini	(Switzerland) Lorenzo Bontempelli	(Belgium) Louis Machiels	(Italy) Alessio Rovera
53	(Italy) AF Corse	Ferrari 488 GT3 Evo 2020	(United Kingdom) Duncan Cameron	(Republic of Ireland) Matt Griffin	(Italy) Rino Mastronardi	(Spain) Miguel Molina
61	(Malaysia) EBM Giga Racing	Porsche 911 GT3 R	(New Zealand) Will Bamber	(Malaysia) Adrian D'Silva	(New Zealand) Reid Harker	(Luxembourg) Carlos Rivas
69	(United Kingdom) Ram Racing	Mercedes-AMG GT3 Evo	(United Kingdom) Ricky Collard	(United Kingdom) Rob Collard	(United Kingdom) Sam De Haan	(Germany) Fabian Schiller
70	(United Kingdom) Inception Racing with Optimum Motorsport	McLaren 720S GT3	(United States) Brendan Iribe	(United States) Kevin Madsen	(United Kingdom) Ollie Millroy	(South Africa) Jordan Pepper
77	(United Kingdom) Barwell Motorsport	Lamborghini Huracán GT3 Evo	(Portugal) Henrique Chaves	(Russia) Leo Machitski	(United Kingdom) Sandy Mitchell	(Portugal) Miguel Ramos
93	(United Kingdom) Sky - Tempesta Racing	Ferrari 488 GT3 Evo 2020	(Italy) Eddie Cheever III	(Italy) Matteo Cressoni	(United Kingdom) Chris Froggatt	(Hong Kong) Jonathan Hui
107	(France) CMR	Bentley Continental GT3	(France) Nelson Panciatici	(Belgium) Ulysse de Pauw	(France) Gilles Vannelet	(South Africa) Stuart White
188	(United Kingdom) Garage 59	Aston Martin Vantage AMR GT3	(Republic of Ireland) Charlie Eastwood	(United Kingdom) Chris Goodwin	(Switzerland) Marvin Kirchhöfer	(Sweden) Alexander West
911	(Germany) Precote Herberth Motorsport	Porsche 911 GT3 R	(Hong Kong) Antares Au	(Germany) Daniel Allemann	(Germany) Alfred Renauer	(Germany) Robert Renauer
Am Cup (2 entries)
23	(Germany) Huber Motorsport	Porsche 911 GT3 R	(Switzerland) Ivan Jacoma	(Switzerland) Nicolas Leutwiler	(Germany) Nico Menzel	(Germany) Jacob Schell
166	(Switzerland) Hägeli by T2 Racing	Porsche 911 GT3 R	(Germany) Marc Basseng	(Germany) Dennis Busch	(Switzerland) Pieder Decurtins	(Germany) Manuel Lauck

== Results ==
=== Race ===
Class winners denoted in bold and with ‡

Pos	Class	No	Team	Drivers	Car	Laps	Time/Reason
1	**Pro**	**51**	**(Italy) Iron Lynx**	**(France) Côme Ledogar (Denmark) Nicklas Nielsen (Italy) Alessandro Pier Guidi**	**Ferrari 488 GT3 Evo 2020**	**556**	**24:01:16.554‡**
2	Pro	32	(Belgium) Audi Sport Team WRT	(Belgium) Dries Vanthoor (South Africa) Kelvin van der Linde (Belgium) Charles Weerts	Audi R8 LMS Evo	556	+3.978
3	Pro	95	(United Kingdom) Garage 59 AMR	(United Kingdom) Ross Gunn (Denmark) Marco Sørensen (Denmark) Nicki Thiim	Aston Martin Vantage AMR GT3	556	+1:24.957
4	Pro	37	(Belgium) Audi Sport Team WRT	(Netherlands) Robin Frijns (Denmark) Dennis Lind (Switzerland) Nico Müller	Audi R8 LMS Evo	554	+2 Laps
5	Pro	47	(Hong Kong) KCMG	(Belgium) Maxime Martin (United Kingdom) Nick Tandy (Belgium) Laurens Vanthoor	Porsche 911 GT3 R	554	+2 Laps
6	Pro	25	(France) Audi Sport Team Saintéloc	(Germany) Christopher Haase (Switzerland) Patric Niederhauser (Germany) Marcus Winkelhock	Audi R8 LMS Evo	554	+2 Laps
7	Pro	38	(United Kingdom) Jota Sport	(United Kingdom) Ben Barnicoat (United Kingdom) Rob Bell (United Kingdom) Ollie Wilkinson	McLaren 720S GT3	554	+2 Laps
8	Pro	63	(China) Orange 1 FFF Racing Team	(Italy) Mirko Bortolotti (Italy) Andrea Caldarelli (Italy) Marco Mapelli	Lamborghini Huracán GT3 Evo	554	+2 Laps
9	Pro	66	(Germany) Audi Sport Team Attempto	(Italy) Mattia Drudi (Germany) Christopher Mies (Germany) Kim-Luis Schramm	Audi R8 LMS Evo	554	+2 Laps
10	Pro	89	(France) AKKA ASP Team	(Austria) Lucas Auer (Russia) Timur Boguslavskiy (Brazil) Felipe Fraga	Mercedes-AMG GT3 Evo	552	+4 Laps
11	**Silver**	**90**	**(Argentina) MadPanda Motorsport**	**(Netherlands) Rik Breukers (Finland) Patrick Kujala (Argentina) Ezequiel Pérez Companc (Mexico) Ricardo Sanchez**	**Mercedes-AMG GT3 Evo**	**551**	**+5 Laps‡**
12	Pro	18	(Hong Kong) KCMG	(Australia) Josh Burdon (Switzerland) Alexandre Imperatori (Italy) Edoardo Liberati	Porsche 911 GT3 R	550	+6 Laps
13	Silver	7	(Germany) Toksport WRT	(Germany) Marvin Dienst (Zimbabwe) Axcil Jefferies (France) Paul Petit (Colombia) Óscar Tunjo	Mercedes-AMG GT3 Evo	550	+6 Laps
14	Silver	159	(United Kingdom) Garage 59	(France) Valentin Hasse-Clot (Denmark) Nicolai Kjærgaard (United Kingdom) Alex MacDowall (Finland) Tuomas Tujula	Aston Martin Vantage AMR GT3	550	+6 Laps
15	Silver	99	(Germany) Attempto Racing	(Germany) Alex Aka (Austria) Max Hofer (France) Fabien Lavergne	Audi R8 LMS Evo	550	+6 Laps
16	**Pro-Am**	**53**	**(Italy) AF Corse**	**(United Kingdom) Duncan Cameron (Republic of Ireland) Matt Griffin (Italy) Rino Mastronardi (Spain) Miguel Molina**	**Ferrari 488 GT3 Evo 2020**	**550**	**+6 Laps‡**
17	Pro-Am	52	(Italy) AF Corse	(Italy) Andrea Bertolini (Belgium) Louis Machiels (Italy) Alessio Rovera (Belgium) John Wartique	Ferrari 488 GT3 Evo 2020	549	+7 Laps
18	Pro-Am	77	(United Kingdom) Barwell Motorsport	(Portugal) Henrique Chaves (Russia) Leo Machitski (United Kingdom) Sandy Mitchell (Portugal) Miguel Ramos	Lamborghini Huracán GT3 Evo	547	+9 Laps
19	Pro-Am	93	(United Kingdom) Sky - Tempesta Racing	(United Kingdom) Eddie Cheever III (Italy) Matteo Cressoni (United Kingdom) Chris Froggatt (Hong Kong) Jonathan Hui	Ferrari 488 GT3 Evo 2020	547	+9 Laps
20	Pro-Am	61	(Malaysia) EBM Giga Racing	(New Zealand) Will Bamber (Malaysia) Adrian Henry D'Silva (New Zealand) Reid Harker (Luxembourg) Carlos Rivas	Porsche 911 GT3 R	547	+9 Laps
21	Silver	40	(Germany) SPS Automotive Performance	(Switzerland) Miklas Born (Germany) Lance David Arnold (Australia) Jordan Love (Switzerland) Yannick Mettler	Mercedes-AMG GT3 Evo	547	+9 Laps
22	Silver	30	(United Kingdom) ROFGO Racing with Team WRT	(Argentina) Franco Colapinto (Germany) Benjamin Goethe (United Kingdom) James Pull	Audi R8 LMS Evo	546	+10 Laps
23	Silver	87	(France) AKKA ASP Team	(France) Thomas Drouet (France) Simon Gachet (Russia) Konstantin Tereshchenko (Romania) Petru Umbrărescu	Mercedes-AMG GT3 Evo	545	+11 Laps
24	Silver	31	(Belgium) Belgian Audi Club Team WRT	(United Kingdom) Frank Bird (Denmark) Valdemar Eriksen (Japan) Ryuichiro Tomita	Audi R8 LMS Evo	545	+11 Laps
25	Pro-Am	20	(Germany) SPS Automotive Performance	(Austria) Dominik Baumann (United States) Colin Braun (United States) George Kurtz (Germany) Valentin Pierburg	Mercedes-AMG GT3 Evo	544	+12 Laps
26	Pro-Am	911	(Germany) Precote Herberth Motorsport	(Hong Kong) Antares Au (Switzerland) Daniel Allemann (Germany) Alfred Renauer (Germany) Robert Renauer	Porsche 911 GT3 R	542	+14 Laps
27	Silver	222	(Germany) Allied-Racing	(Switzerland) Julien Apotheloz (Denmark) Bastian Buus (Germany) Lars Kern (France) Arno Santamato	Porsche 911 GT3 R	542	+14 Laps
28	Pro-Am	70	(United Kingdom) Inception Racing with Optimum Motorsport	(United States) Brendan Iribe (United States) Kevin Madsen (United Kingdom) Oliver Millroy (South Africa) Jordan Pepper	McLaren 720S GT3	537	+19 Laps
29	Silver	27	(France) Saintéloc Racing	(France) Alexandre Cougnaud (Switzerland) Lucas Légeret (Monaco) Louis Prette (France) Aurélien Panis	Audi R8 LMS Evo	534	+22 Laps
30	Silver	33	(Germany) Rinaldi Racing	(Italy) Fabrizio Crestani (Chile) Benjamín Hites (South Africa) David Perel	Ferrari 488 GT3 Evo 2020	533	+23 Laps†
31	Silver	14	(Switzerland) Emil Frey Racing	(Switzerland) Ricardo Feller (Switzerland) Alex Fontana (Switzerland) Rolf Ineichen	Lamborghini Huracán GT3 Evo	527	+29 Laps†
32	Pro-Am	11	(Switzerland) Kessel Racing	(Italy) David Fumanelli (Germany) Tim Kohmann (Italy) Giorgio Roda (Italy) Francesco Zollo	Ferrari 488 GT3 Evo 2020	525	+31 Laps†
33	**Am**	**166**	**(Switzerland) Hägeli by T2 Racing**	**(Germany) Marc Basseng (Germany) Dennis Busch (Switzerland) Pieder Decurtins (Germany) Manuel Lauck**	**Porsche 911 GT3 R**	**518**	**+38 Laps‡**
34	Pro-Am	69	(United Kingdom) Ram Racing	(United Kingdom) Ricky Collard (United Kingdom) Rob Collard (United Kingdom) Sam de Haan (Germany) Fabian Schiller	Mercedes-AMG GT3 Evo	474	+82 Laps†
35	Pro-Am	10	(Belgium) Boutsen Ginion Racing	(Germany) Jens Liebhauser (Germany) Jens Klingmann (Saudi Arabia) Karim Ojjeh (France) Yann Zimmer	BMW M6 GT3	439	+117 Laps
36	Pro	4	(Germany) BWT Haupt Racing Team	(France) Vincent Abril (Germany) Maro Engel (Germany) Luca Stolz	Mercedes-AMG GT3 Evo	431	+125 Laps†
37	Pro	50	(Taiwan) HubAuto Racing	(Germany) Maximilian Buhk (Netherlands) Nick Catsburg (Germany) Maximilian Götz	Mercedes-AMG GT3 Evo	408	+148 Laps
38	Am	23	(Germany) Huber Motorsport	(Switzerland) Ivan Jacoma (Switzerland) Nicolas Leutwiler (Germany) Nico Menzel (Germany) Jacob Schell	Porsche 911 GT3 R	395	+161 Laps†
NC	Pro-Am	2	(Germany) GetSpeed Performance	(Germany) Nico Bastian (Luxembourg) Olivier Grotz (Germany) Florian Scholze (France) Jim Pla	Mercedes-AMG GT3 Evo	376	Mechanical
NC	Silver	16	(Austria) GRT Grasser Racing Team	(Italy) Alberto Maria di Folco (Italy) Emilian Galbiati (Austria) Clemens Schmid (Germany) Tim Zimmermann	Lamborghini Huracán GT3 Evo	349	Accident
NC	Pro	88	(France) Mercedes-AMG Team AKKA ASP	(France) Jules Gounon (Spain) Daniel Juncadella (Italy) Raffaele Marciello	Mercedes-AMG GT3 Evo	344	Dampers
NC	Pro	54	(Italy) Dinamic Motorsport	(Austria) Klaus Bachler (Italy) Matteo Cairoli (Germany) Christian Engelhart	Porsche 911 GT3 R	341	Mechanical
NC	Pro-Am	107	(France) CMR	(France) Nelson Panciatici (Belgium) Ulysse de Pauw (France) Gilles Vannelet (South Africa) Stuart White	Bentley Continental GT3	300	Mechanical
NC	Pro-Am	188	(United Kingdom) Garage 59	(Republic of Ireland) Charlie Eastwood (United Kingdom) Chris Goodwin (Germany) Marvin Kirchhöfer (Sweden) Alexander West	Aston Martin Vantage AMR GT3	292	Gearbox
NC	Pro	3	(Germany) Schnabl Engineering	(Denmark) Michael Christensen (France) Frédéric Makowiecki (Norway) Dennis Olsen	Porsche 911 GT3 R	254	Accident
NC	Pro	22	(United Arab Emirates) GPX Martini Racing	(New Zealand) Earl Bamber (Australia) Matthew Campbell (France) Mathieu Jaminet	Porsche 911 GT3 R	246	Steering
NC	Silver	666	(Italy) Vincenzo Sospiri Racing	(Netherlands) Glenn van Berlo (Belgium) Baptiste Moulin (Japan) Yuki Nemoto (Estonia) Martin Rump	Lamborghini Huracán GT3 Evo	245	Mechanical
NC	Pro	34	(Germany) Walkenhorst Motorsport	(United Kingdom) David Pittard (South Africa) Sheldon van der Linde (Germany) Marco Wittmann	BMW M6 GT3	221	Engine
NC	Pro	35	(Germany) Walkenhorst Motorsport	(Germany) Timo Glock (France) Thomas Neubauer (Germany) Martin Tomczyk	BMW M6 GT3	213	Accident damage
NC	Pro-Am	19	(China) Orange 1 FFF Racing Team	(Belgium) Bertrand Baguette (Italy) Stefano Costantini (Japan) Hiroshi Hamaguchi (United Kingdom) Phil Keen	Lamborghini Huracán GT3 Evo	180	Electrical
NC	Silver	57	(United States) Winward Motorsport	(United Kingdom) Philip Ellis (Canada) Mikaël Grenier (United States) Russell Ward	Mercedes-AMG GT3 Evo	167	Accident
NC	Pro	26	(France) Saintéloc Racing	(United Kingdom) Jamie Green (United Kingdom) Finlay Hutchison (France) Adrien Tambay	Audi R8 LMS Evo	155	Accident damage
NC	Pro	56	(Italy) Dinamic Motorsport	(France) Romain Dumas (Denmark) Mikkel O. Pedersen (Italy) Andrea Rizzoli	Porsche 911 GT3 R	134	Mechanical
NC	Silver	5	(Germany) Haupt Racing Team	(Germany) Patrick Assenheimer (Italy) Michele Beretta (Netherlands) Indy Dontje (Germany) Hubert Haupt	Mercedes-AMG GT3 Evo	71	Mechanical
NC	Pro	114	(Switzerland) Emil Frey Racing	(United Kingdom) Jack Aitken (Finland) Konsta Lappalainen (France) Arthur Rougier	Lamborghini Huracán GT3 Evo	9	Accident
NC	Pro	163	(Switzerland) Emil Frey Racing	(Italy) Giacomo Altoè (Spain) Albert Costa (France) Franck Perera	Lamborghini Huracán GT3 Evo	9	Accident
NC	Pro	71	(Italy) Iron Lynx	(Italy) Antonio Fuoco (United Kingdom) Callum Ilott (Italy) Davide Rigon	Ferrari 488 GT3 Evo 2020	9	Accident
NC	Pro	21	(Germany) Rutronik Racing	(France) Kévin Estre (Austria) Richard Lietz (Germany) Sven Müller	Porsche 911 GT3 R	9	Accident
FINAL RESULTS

- † indicates car was classified, but not running at the finish.

Previous race: 2020 Kyalami 9 Hours	Intercontinental GT Challenge; 2021 season	Next race: 2021 Indianapolis 8 Hours
Previous race: 2021 Paul Ricard 1000km	GT World Challenge Europe Endurance Cup; 2021 season	Next race: 2021 3 Hours of Nürburgring
