= Charles Weerts =

Belgian racing driver

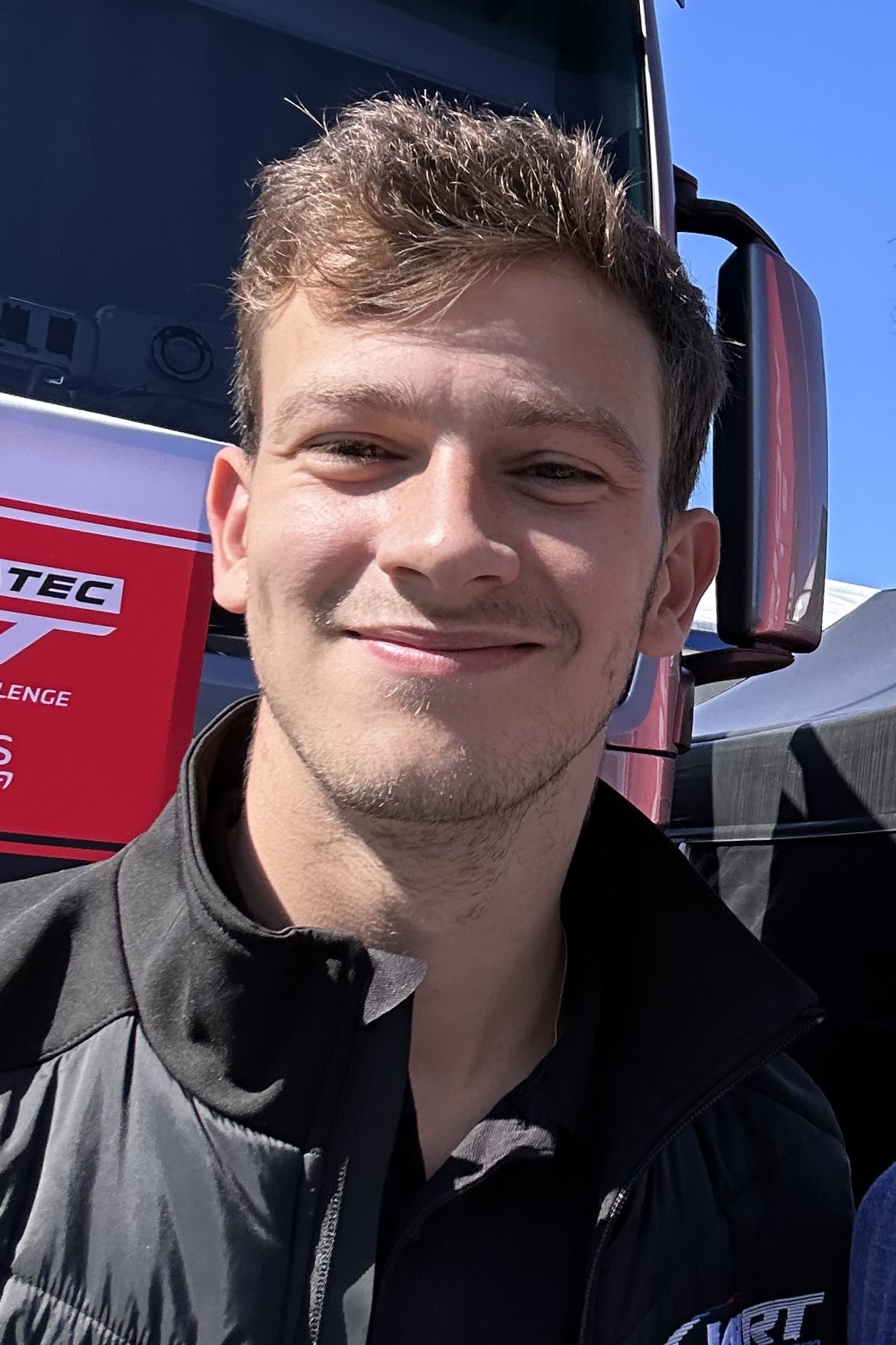
- Weerts in 2023
- Nationality: (Belgium) Belgian
- Born: Charles Pierre Julien Weerts; 1 March 2001 (age 25) Verviers, Belgium

GT World Challenge Europe Sprint Cup career
- Debut season: 2019
- Current team: Team WRT
- Categorisation: FIA Silver (until 2021); FIA Gold (2022); FIA Platinum (2023–)
- Car number: 32
- Starts: 60
- Wins: 16
- Podiums: 35
- Poles: 8
- Fastest laps: 5

Previous series
- ADAC Formula 4 Formula 4 UAE Championship: 2017–2018; 2016–2018

Championship titles
- 2017–18 2020, 2021, 2022, 2025 2024: Formula 4 UAE Championship; GT World Challenge Europe Sprint Cup; Intercontinental GT Challenge

GT World Challenge Europe Endurance Cup career
- Debut season: 2019
- Current team: Team WRT
- Car number: 32
- Starts: 29
- Wins: 1
- Podiums: 5
- Poles: 2
- Statistics up to date as of 31 March 2025.

Charles Pierre Julien Weerts (born 1 March 2001) is a Belgian racing driver who currently competes in the GT World Challenge Europe. On December 8, 2022, Weerts was announced as a factory driver for BMW M Motorsport where he would continue to drive for Team WRT.

== Career ==
=== Junior formula ===
Weerts made his single-seater debut in 2017, joining Team Motopark for the 2017 ADAC Formula 4 season, alongside the final three races of the Formula 4 UAE Championship. During the 2017 ADAC F4 season, he would score 22nd in the overall classification and second in the Rookie Championship, scoring just three points towards the drivers' title. The following Formula 4 UAE season, Weerts was crowned series champion, sweeping the final quadruple-header round at Dubai Autodrome en route to a 50-point lead over second-placed David Schumacher. However, the victory would mark Weerts' final season with Team Motopark, as he would switch to Van Amersfoort Racing for the 2018 ADAC Formula 4 season. After finishing fifth in points, securing one win and four podiums, Weerts would leave the team at the conclusion of the 2018 season.

=== Sports cars ===
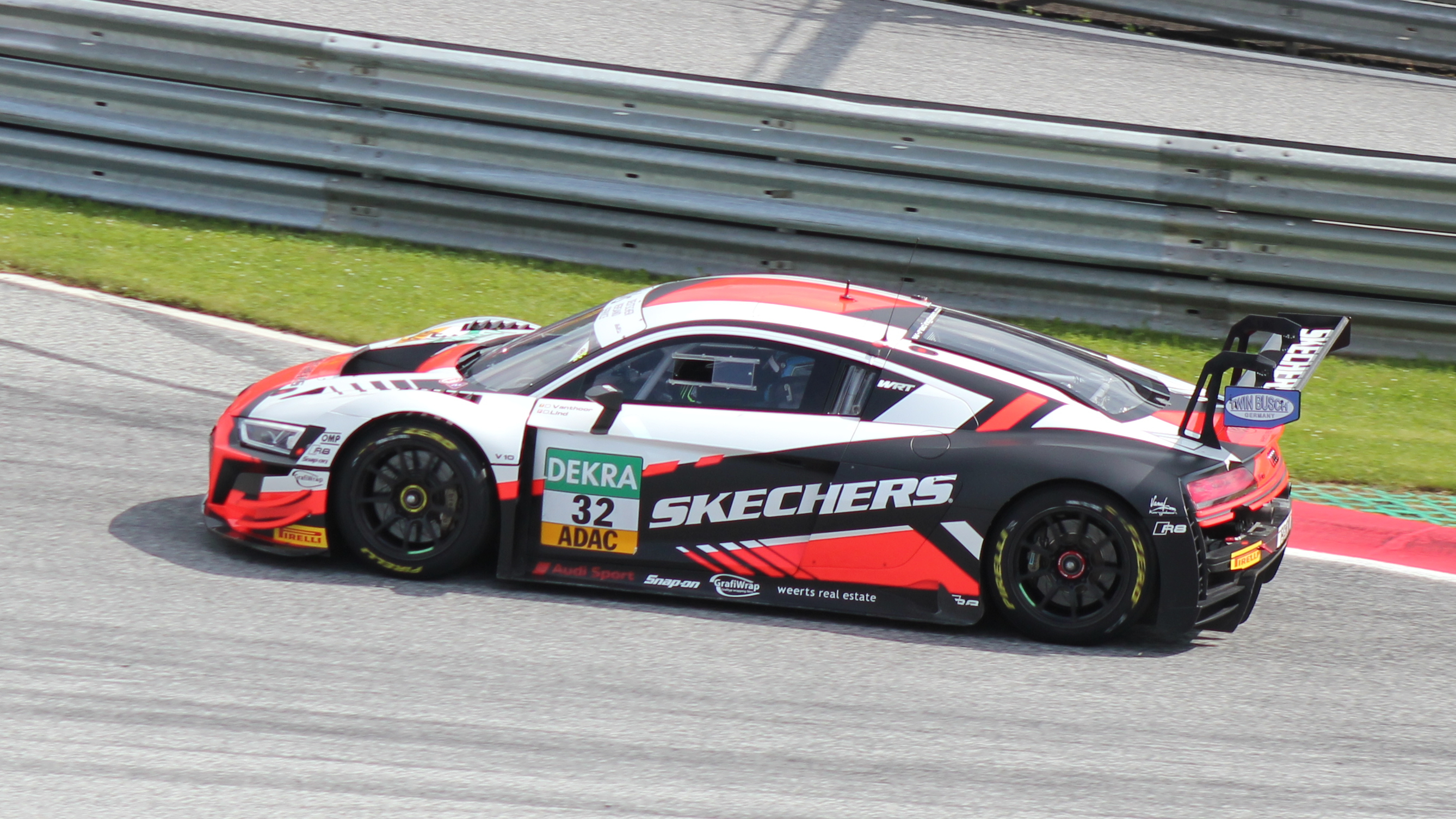
Weerts' Audi at the Red Bull Ring in 2021

2019 saw Weerts explore a new discipline of motorsport, joining Belgian Audi Club Team WRT for the 2019 Blancpain GT Series Endurance Cup campaign. After a lackluster 2019 season which saw Weerts' entries score a solitary point across five races, he was paired with Dries Vanthoor for full season campaigns in both series during 2020. After scoring two wins and six podiums in ten races, Vanthoor and Weerts claimed the Sprint Cup title in the Pro category. Following his title, Weerts was promoted to Audi factory driver status for 2021. He began the team's title defense on a high note, taking pole for the opening race of the weekend at Magny-Cours, before going on to win Saturday's event, further adding a podium finish the following afternoon. Following the fourth round at Brands Hatch, Weerts and Vanthoor successfully defended their Sprint Cup title. In 2022, Weerts, together with Vanthoor were able to clinch a third consecutive Sprint Cup title. They finished the season with five wins and nine podiums in ten races.

=== BMW M Factory Driver ===
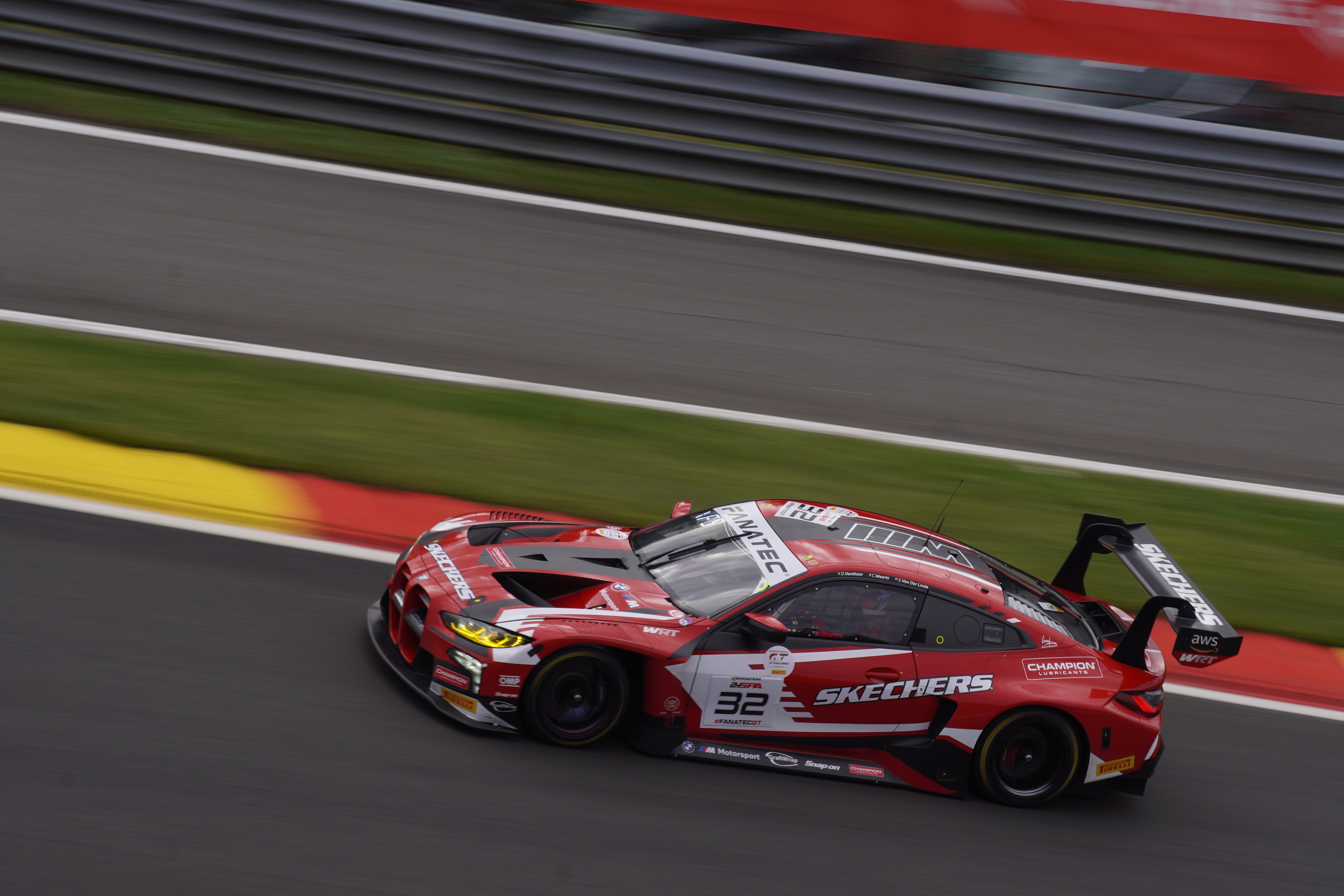
Weerts' #32 BMW M4 GT3 during the 2023 24 Hours of Spa

At the end of the 2022 season, Weerts confirmed he would part ways with Audi Sport and was later announced as a factory BMW M driver from the 2023 season on. He was joined by his current teammate Dries Vanthoor and Team WRT, both making the switch from Audi as well. In his first race as an official BMW factory driver, the 2023 Kyalami 9 Hours, Weerts scored the overall victory alongside Vanthoor and Sheldon van der Linde. Weerts once again embarked on a full-season GT World Challenge Europe campaign. Weerts stated his ambitions to remain on top in the Sprint Cup, but argued that the change in machinery for 2023 ensured that the team's efforts to score a fourth consecutive title wouldn't be easy. Ultimately, the entry finished third in Sprint Cup points, tallying six total podium finishes and a sole race victory during the penultimate race weekend at Valencia. In Endurance Cup competition, Weerts, Vanthoor, and van der Linde registered a best race finish of sixth at Monza, finishing 11th in the final points classification.

Heading into their second BMW season, Weerts and Vanthoor remained in the Sprint Cup and once again partnered van der Linde in the Endurance events. The year began with two mistakes from Weerts, who first crashed with a lapped car at the Bathurst 12 Hours and then retired from the opening Endurance Cup event as a result of a collision with Alessio Rovera. He redeemed himself in the first pair of Sprint Cup rounds, winning at Brands Hatch due to a strong pit stop as well as taking pole and victory in race 2 of the Misano weekend. Weerts and the WRT team would continue their strong form through the year taking podiums in Monza, Spa, Hockenheim, and winning round 1 at Magny-Cours. However, following a podium-less conclusion to both their sprint and combined seasons at Barcelona and Jeddah respectively, Weerts would finish runner-up to the Winward pairing of Engel and Auer. 2.5 points separated them in either championship, marking definite progress in his second year as a BMW factory driver, but not quite the championship dominating form of previous races. He would, however be crowned Intercontinental GT Challenge champion following an excellent run of consistent podiums and race wins after initially retiring from the opening round at Bathurst.

Heading into 2025, WRT and many other BMW associated teams received an upgrade package from BMW for their M4 GT3. These improvements meant that Weerts and WRT seemingly got off to the perfect start, with Weerts opening the year with a win at the 6H of Dubai. He also showed marked improvement in the old car as well, following the sister car home in a 1–2 at the Bathurst 12H. The momentum would carry into the opening round of the Fanatec GT World Challenge Europe season, with new teammates in recently announced BMW factory driver Kelvin van der Linde full time, and another newcomer in the form of the rising young talent Ugo De Wilde for endurance rounds. The new pairing would open the championship with a win at the 6 hour event at Circuit Paul Richard. They would then score a podium in round two of Brands Hatch and then secure their first spring win of the campaign in round two at Zanvoort. Currently, they sit atop all three championships as a result.

== Personal life ==
Weerts is heir to real estate and logistics company Weerts Group, with his father Yves having been its CEO since 1994. Yves Weerts is a member of the board of directors at W Racing Team.

== Racing record ==
=== Career summary ===
Season	Series	Team	Races	Wins	Poles	F/Laps	Podiums	Points	Position
2016–17	Formula 4 UAE Championship	Team Motopark 2	11	0	0	0	1	84	7th
2017	ADAC Formula 4 Championship	Motopark	21	0	0	0	0	3	22nd
2017–18	Formula 4 UAE Championship	Dragon Motopark F4	23	8	3	8	16	377	**1st**
2018	ADAC Formula 4 Championship	Van Amersfoort Racing	21	1	0	2	4	195	5th
2018	Italian F4 Championship	Van Amersfoort Racing	3	0	0	0	0	15	18th
2018	FIA GT Nations Cup	Team Belgium	3	1	1	0	1	N/A	DNF
2019	Blancpain GT Series Sprint Cup	Belgian Audi Club Team WRT	10	1	1	0	1	40.5	6th
2019	Blancpain GT Series Endurance Cup	Belgian Audi Club Team WRT	3	0	0	0	0	0	NC
2019	Italian GT Endurance Championship - GT3 Pro	Audi Sport Italia	2	0	0	0	2	?	?
2020	GT World Challenge Europe Sprint Cup	Belgian Audi Club Team WRT	10	2	0	0	6	89	**1st**
2020	GT World Challenge Europe Endurance Cup	Belgian Audi Club Team WRT	4	0	0	0	0	39	8th
2020	ADAC GT Masters	Team WRT	12	1	0	0	3	82	10th
2020	Intercontinental GT Challenge	Audi Sport Team WRT	1	0	0	0	1	18	14th
2021	GT World Challenge Europe Sprint Cup	Belgian Audi Club Team WRT	10	4	2	1	7	103.5	**1st**
2021	GT World Challenge Europe Endurance Cup	Belgian Audi Club Team WRT	5	0	0	0	3	79	**3rd**
2021	Intercontinental GT Challenge	Audi Sport Team WRT	3	0	0	0	1	40	5th
2021	ADAC GT Masters	Team WRT	12	1	1	0	1	66	14th
2021	Le Mans Cup - GT3	Team WRT	2	0	0	0	0	0	NC†
2022	GT World Challenge Europe Sprint Cup	Team WRT	10	5	3	1	9	135.5	**1st**
2022	GT World Challenge Europe Endurance Cup	Team WRT	5	1	2	0	1	39	9th
2022	Intercontinental GT Challenge	Audi Sport Team WRT	1	0	0	0	0	0	NC
2023	GT World Challenge Europe Endurance Cup	Team WRT	5	0	0	0	0	26	11th
2023	GT World Challenge Europe Sprint Cup	Team WRT	10	1	1	0	6	86.5	**3rd**
2023	Intercontinental GT Challenge	Team WRT	5	1	0	1	1	44	9th
2024	GT World Challenge America - Pro	Team WRT	1	1	1	1	1	0	NC†
2024	GT World Challenge Europe Endurance Cup	Team WRT	5	0	0	0	2	48	7th
2024	GT World Challenge Europe Sprint Cup	Team WRT	10	3	1	4	7	104.5	**2nd**
2024	Intercontinental GT Challenge	Team WRT	3	2	0	0	2	68	**1st**
2024	Intercontinental GT Challenge	BMW M Team RMG	1	0	0	0	1	68	**1st**
2024	Nürburgring Langstrecken-Serie - SP9	BMW M Team RMG	2	0	0	0	0	0	NC†
2024	24 Hours of Nürburgring - SP9	BMW M Team RMG	1	0	0	0	1	N/A	**3rd**
2025	Middle East Trophy - GT3	The Bend Team WRT	1	1	1	0	1	0	NC†
2025	GT World Challenge Europe Endurance Cup	Team WRT	5	1	1	1	1	63	**3rd**
2025	GT World Challenge Europe Sprint Cup	Team WRT	10	2	0	0	6	88.5	**1st**
2025	Intercontinental GT Challenge	Team WRT	4	2	0	0	3	78	**3rd**
2025	Nürburgring Langstrecken-Serie - SP3T	FK Performance Motorsport	2	0	0	1	2	0	NC†
2025	24 Hours of Nürburgring - SP3T	FK Performance Motorsport	1	1	0	0	1	N/A	**1st**
2026	Nürburgring Langstrecken-Serie - SP9	Schubert Motorsport	2	0	0	0	0	*	*
2026	24 Hours of Nürburgring - SP9	Schubert Motorsport	1	0	0	0	0	N/A	7th
2026	Intercontinental GT Challenge	Schubert Motorsport	1	0	0	0	0	8	26th
2026	Intercontinental GT Challenge	Team WRT	2	0	0	0	0	8	26th
2026	GT World Challenge Europe Endurance Cup	Team WRT	5	0	0	0	1	42	4th
2026	GT World Challenge Europe Sprint Cup	Team WRT	10	2	0	1	3	55	5th
2026	Italian GT Championship Sprint Cup - GT3	Gino Motorsport	2	0	1	1	1	15	NC†
2026	Italian GT Championship Endurance Cup - GT3	Gino Motorsport	1	0	0	0	0	2	NC†

^{†} As Weerts was a guest driver, he was ineligible to score points.
^{*} Season still in progress.

=== Complete Formula 4 UAE Championship results ===
(key) (Races in bold indicate pole position) (Races in italics indicate fastest lap)

Year	Team	1	2	3	4	5	6	7	8	9	10	11	12	13	14	15	16	17	18	19	20	21	22	23	24	Pos	Points
2016-17	Team Motopark 2	DUB1; 1	DUB1; 2	DUB1; 3	YMC1; 1	YMC1; 2	YMC1; 3	YMC1; 4	DUB2; 1; 6	DUB2; 2 Ret	DUB2; 3; 4	YMC2; 1; 7	YMC2; 2; 5	YMC2; 3; 6	YMC2; 4; 8	YMC3; 1; 5	YMC3; 2; 2	YMC3; 3; 5	YMC3; 4; 6							7th	84
2017-18	Dragon Motopark F4	**YMC1**; **1**; 1	YMC1; 2; 6	YMC1; 3; 2	YMC1; 4; 2	YMC2; 1; 2	YMC2; 2; 3	YMC2; 3; 1	YMC2; 4; 3	DUB1; 1 Ret	DUB1; 2; 5	DUB1; 3; 7	DUB1; 4 C	YMC3; 1; 1	YMC3; 2; 3	YMC3; 3 Ret	YMC3; 4; 4	YMC4; 1; 1	YMC4; 2; 3	YMC4; 3; 3	YMC4; 4; 4	**DUB2**; **1**; 1	DUB2; 2; 1	**DUB2**; **3**; 1	DUB2; 4; 1	1st	377

=== Complete ADAC Formula 4 Championship results ===
(key) (Races in bold indicate pole position) (Races in italics indicate fastest lap)

Year	Team	1	2	3	4	5	6	7	8	9	10	11	12	13	14	15	16	17	18	19	20	21	Pos	Points
2017	Motopark	OSC1; 1; 12	OSC1; 2; 15	OSC1; 3; 18	LAU; 1; 9	LAU; 2; 16	LAU; 3; 13	RBR; 1; 17	RBR; 2 Ret	RBR; 3; 23	OSC2; 1; 18	OSC2; 2; 22	OSC2; 3; 18	NÜR; 1; 21	NÜR; 2; 23	NÜR; 3; 18	SAC; 1 Ret	SAC; 2; 15	SAC; 3; 18	HOC; 1; 21	HOC; 2; 10	HOC; 3; 12	22nd	3
2018	Van Amersfoort Racing	OSC; 1 Ret	OSC; 2; 4	OSC; 3; 3	HOC1; 1; 7	HOC1; 2; 4	HOC1; 3; 4	LAU; 1; 10	LAU; 2; 5	LAU; 3; 2	RBR; 1; 5	RBR; 2 Ret	RBR; 3; 8	HOC2; 1; 8	HOC2; 2; 8	NÜR; 1; 7	NÜR; 2; 5	NÜR; 3; 4	HOC3; 1; 1	HOC3; 2; 4	HOC3; 3; 2		5th	195

=== Complete Italian F4 Championship results ===
(key) (Races in bold indicate pole position) (Races in italics indicate fastest lap)

Year	Team	1	2	3	4	5	6	7	8	9	10	11	12	13	14	15	16	17	18	19	20	21	Pos	Points
2018	Van Amersfoort Racing	ADR; 1	ADR; 2	ADR; 3	LEC; 1; 10	LEC; 2; 5	LEC; 3; 8	MNZ; 1	MNZ; 2	MNZ; 3	MIS; 1	MIS; 2	MIS; 3	IMO; 1	IMO; 2	IMO; 3	VLL; 1	VLL; 2	VLL; 3	MUG; 1	MUG; 2	MUG; 3	18th	15

=== Complete GT World Challenge Europe results ===
==== GT World Challenge Europe Endurance Cup ====
Year	Team	Car	Class	1	2	3	4	5	6	7	Pos.	Points
2019	Belgian Audi Club Team WRT	Audi R8 LMS Evo	Silver	MNZ; 27	SIL; Ret						25th	1
2019	Belgian Audi Club Team WRT	Audi R8 LMS Evo	Pro			LEC; 13	SPA; 6H; 30	SPA; 12H; 22	SPA; 24H; 12	CAT; Ret	NC	0
2020	Belgian Audi Club Team WRT	Audi R8 LMS Evo	Pro	IMO; 4	NÜR; 5	SPA; 6H; 54	SPA; 12H; 54	SPA; 24H; Ret	LEC; 4		8th	39
2021	Belgian Audi Club Team WRT	Audi R8 LMS Evo	Pro	MNZ; Ret	LEC; 2	SPA; 6H; 5	SPA; 12H; 2	SPA; 24H; 2	NÜR; 6	CAT; 3	3rd	79
2022	Team WRT	Audi R8 LMS Evo II	Pro	**IMO**; 1	LEC; 41	SPA; 6H; 14	SPA; 12H; 14	SPA; 24H; Ret	**HOC**; Ret	CAT; 4	9th	39
2023	Team WRT	BMW M4 GT3	Pro	MNZ; 6	LEC; Ret	SPA; 6H; 1	SPA; 12H; 52†	SPA; 24H; Ret	NÜR; 7	CAT; 11	11th	26
2024	Team WRT	BMW M4 GT3	Pro	LEC; Ret	SPA; 6H; 15	SPA; 12H; 16	SPA; 24H; 3	NÜR; 44†	MNZ; 2	JED; 4	7th	48
2025	Team WRT	BMW M4 GT3 Evo	Pro	LEC; 1	MNZ; 5	SPA; 6H; 7	SPA; 12H; 9	SPA; 24H; 7	**NÜR**; 10	CAT; 6	3rd	63
2026	Team WRT	BMW M4 GT3 Evo	Pro	LEC; 4	MNZ; 30	SPA; 6H; 2	SPA; 12H; 24	SPA; 24H; 12	NÜR; 2	ALG; 29	4th	42

^{*} Season still in progress.

==== GT World Challenge Europe Sprint Cup ====
Year	Team	Car	Class	1	2	3	4	5	6	7	8	9	10	Pos.	Points
2019	Belgian Audi Club Team WRT	Audi R8 LMS Evo	Pro	BRH; 1; 12	BRH; 2; 6	**MIS**; **1** Ret	MIS; 2; 1	ZAN; 1; 13	ZAN; 2; 5	NÜR; 1; 4	NÜR; 2; 26	HUN; 1; 8	HUN; 2; 7	6th	40.5
2020	Belgian Audi Club Team WRT	Audi R8 LMS Evo	Pro	MIS; 1; 1	MIS; 2; 4	MIS; 3; 1	MAG; 1; 3	MAG; 2; 4	ZAN; 1; 12	ZAN; 2; 7	CAT; 1; 6	CAT; 2; 2	CAT; 3; 2	1st	89
2021	Team WRT	Audi R8 LMS Evo	Pro	**MAG**; **1**; 1	MAG; 2; 2	ZAN; 1; 8	ZAN; 2; 3	**MIS**; **1**; 1	MIS; 2; 1	BRH; 1; 1	BRH; 2; 2	VAL; 1; 16	VAL; 2 Ret	1st	103.5
2022	Team WRT	Audi R8 LMS Evo II	Pro	BRH; 1; 2	BRH; 2; 2	MAG; 1; 1	MAG; 2; 6	**ZAN**; **1**; 1	ZAN; 2; 2	**MIS**; **1**; 1	**MIS**; **2**; 1	VAL; 1; 3	VAL; 2; 1	1st	135.5
2023	Team WRT	BMW M4 GT3	Pro	BRH; 1; 3	BRH; 2; 3	MIS; 1; 3	**MIS**; **2**; 9	HOC; 1; 3	HOC; 2; 5	VAL; 1; 5	VAL; 2; 1	ZAN; 1; 5	ZAN; 2; 2	3rd	86.5
2024	Team WRT	BMW M4 GT3	Pro	BRH; 1; 1	BRH; 2; 7	MIS; 1; 2	**MIS**; **2**; 1	HOC; 1; 2	HOC; 2; 2	MAG; 1; 1	MAG; 2; 2	CAT; 1; 9	CAT; 2; 7	2nd	104.5
2025	Team WRT	BMW M4 GT3 Evo	Pro	BRH; 1; 7	BRH; 2; 2	ZAN; 1; 5	ZAN; 2; 1	MIS; 1; 3	MIS; 2; 5	MAG; 1; 3	MAG; 2; 3	VAL; 1 Ret	VAL; 2; 1	1st	88.5
2026	Team WRT	BMW M4 GT3 Evo	Pro	BRH; 1; 3	BRH; 2; 6	MIS; 1; 1	MIS; 2; 1	MAG; 1; 7	MAG; 2 Ret	ZAN; 1 Ret	ZAN; 2; 15	CAT; 1; 10	CAT; 2; 6	5th	55

^{*} Season still in progress.

=== Complete ADAC GT Masters results ===
(key) (Races in bold indicate pole position) (Races in italics indicate fastest lap)

Year	Team	Car	1	2	3	4	5	6	7	8	9	10	11	12	13	14	Pos.	Points
2020	Team WRT	Audi R8 LMS Evo	LAU; 1; 20	**LAU**; **2**; 1	NÜR; 1 Ret	NÜR; 2; 2	HOC; 1; 14	HOC; 2 DSQ	SAC; 1; 11	SAC; 2; 2	RBR; 1 WD	RBR; 2 WD	LAU; 1; 23	LAU; 2; 26	OSC; 1; 15	OSC; 2; 7	10th	82
2021	Team WRT	Audi R8 LMS Evo	OSC; 1; 11	OSC; 2; 12	RBR; 1	RBR; 2	ZAN; 1; 5	**ZAN**; **2**; 1	LAU; 1 Ret	LAU; 2; 24	SAC; 1; 6	SAC; 2 Ret	HOC; 1; 23	HOC; 2 Ret	NÜR; 1; 10	NÜR; 2 Ret	14th	66

=== Complete Intercontinental GT Challenge results ===
Year	Manufacturer	Car	1	2	3	4	5	Pos.	Points
2020	Audi	Audi R8 LMS Evo	BAT	IND	SPA	KYA; 2		14th	18
2021	Audi	Audi R8 LMS Evo	SPA; 2	IND; 5	KYA; 4			6th	40
2022	Audi	Audi R8 LMS Evo II	BAT	SPA; Ret	IND	GUL		NC	0
2023	BMW	BMW M4 GT3	BAT; 4	KYA; 1	SPA; Ret	IND; 10	GUL; 7	9th	44
2024	BMW	BMW M4 GT3	BAT; Ret	**NÜR**; 2	SPA; 1	IND; 1		1st	68
2025	BMW	BMW M4 GT3	BAT; 2					4th	78
2025	BMW	BMW M4 GT3 Evo		NÜR	SPA; 5	SUZ; 1	IND; 1	4th	78
2026	BMW	BMW M4 GT3 Evo	BAT; 11	NÜR; 6	SPA; 11	SUZ	IND	26th	8

=== Complete 24 Hours of Spa results ===
Year	Team	Co-Drivers	Car	Class	Laps	Pos.	Class Pos.
2019	(Belgium) Belgian Audi Club Team WRT	(France) Norman Nato (Netherlands) Rik Breukers	Audi R8 LMS	Pro Cup	362	12th	12th
2020	(Belgium) Belgian Audi Club Team WRT	(Switzerland) Edoardo Mortara (Germany) Frank Stippler	Audi R8 LMS Evo	Pro Cup	70	DNF	DNF
2021	(Belgium) Audi Sport Team WRT	(South Africa) Kelvin van der Linde (Belgium) Dries Vanthoor	Audi R8 LMS Evo	Pro Cup	556	**2nd**	**2nd**
2022	(Belgium) Audi Sport Team WRT	(South Africa) Kelvin van der Linde (Belgium) Dries Vanthoor	Audi R8 LMS Evo II	Pro Cup	293	DNF	DNF
2023	(Belgium) Team WRT	(South Africa) Sheldon van der Linde (Belgium) Dries Vanthoor	BMW M4 GT3	Pro Cup	250	DNF	DNF
2024	(Belgium) Team WRT	(South Africa) Sheldon van der Linde (Belgium) Dries Vanthoor	BMW M4 GT3	Pro Cup	478	3rd	3rd
2025	(Belgium) Team WRT	(Belgium) Ugo de Wilde (South Africa) Kelvin van der Linde	BMW M4 GT3 Evo	Pro Cup	548	7th	7th
2026	(Belgium) Team WRT	(South Africa) Jordan Pepper (South Africa) Kelvin van der Linde	BMW M4 GT3 Evo	Pro Cup	541	12th	10th

=== Complete 24 Hours of Nürburgring results ===
Year	Team	Co-Drivers	Car	Class	Laps	Pos.	Class Pos.
2024	(Germany) BMW M Team RMG	(United Kingdom) Daniel Harper (Germany) Max Hesse	BMW M4 GT3	SP9 Pro	50	3rd	3rd
2025	(Germany) FK Performance Motorsport	(Germany) Michael Bräutigam (Belgium) Ugo de Wilde (Germany) Jens Klingmann	BMW M2 Racing (G87)	SP 3T	120	35th	1st
2026	(Germany) Schubert Motorsport	(Austria) Philipp Eng (Netherlands) Robin Frijns (Germany) Marco Wittmann	BMW M4 GT3 Evo	SP9 Pro	154	8th	7th

=== Complete Bathurst 12 Hour results ===
Year	Team	Co-Drivers	Car	Class	Laps	Pos.	Class Pos.
2023	(Belgium) Team WRT	(Belgium) Dries Vanthoor (South Africa) Sheldon van der Linde	BMW M4 GT3	Pro	323	4th	4th
2024	(Belgium) Team WRT	(Belgium) Dries Vanthoor (South Africa) Sheldon van der Linde	BMW M4 GT3	Pro	120	DNF	
2025	(Belgium) Team WRT	(Switzerland) Raffaele Marciello (Italy) Valentino Rossi	BMW M4 GT3	Pro	306	**2nd**	**2nd**
2026	(Belgium) Team WRT	(South Africa) Jordan Pepper (South Africa) Kelvin van der Linde	BMW M4 GT3 Evo	Pro	262	12th	8th

Sporting positions
Preceded by Jonathan Aberdein	Formula 4 UAE Championship; Champion; 2017–18	Succeeded by Matteo Nannini
Preceded by Andrea Caldarelli; Marco Mapelli	GT World Challenge Europe Sprint Cup; Pro Champion; 2020, 2021, 2022; With: Dries Vanthoor	Succeeded by Mattia Drudi; Ricardo Feller
