= 2021 Intercontinental GT Challenge =

Motorsport season

The 2021 Intercontinental GT Challenge was the sixth season of the Intercontinental GT Challenge. Normally a five round season, the races in the Pacific Rim were eliminated because of pandemic-related restrictions, reducing the season to three rounds, one in Europe (24 Hours of Spa on 31 July), one in North America (Indianapolis 8 Hour), and one in Africa (Kyalami 9 Hours, later postponed to 5 February 2022). Nicky Catsburg and Augusto Farfus were the defending drivers' champions and Porsche was the defending Manufacturers' champion.

== Calendar ==
At the annual press conference during the 2020 24 Hours of Spa on 23 October, the Stéphane Ratel Organisation announced the first draft of the 2021 calendar.

Round	Race	Circuit	Date	Report
1	24 Hours of Spa	Circuit de Spa-Francorchamps, Stavelot, Belgium	31 July–1 August 2021	report
2	Indianapolis 8 Hour	Indianapolis Motor Speedway, Indianapolis, United States	17 October 2021	report
3	Kyalami 9 Hours	Kyalami Grand Prix Circuit, Midrand, South Africa	5 February 2022	report

Also part of the GT World Challenge Europe
Also part of the GT World Challenge America

The Kyalami 9 Hours was rescheduled from 4 December 2021 to 5 February 2022 due to SARS-CoV-2 Omicron variant cases in South Africa.

== Entry list ==
Manufacturer	Team	Car	No.	Drivers	Class	Rounds
Audi	(France) Audi Sport Team Saintéloc Racing	R8 LMS Evo	25	(Switzerland) Patric Niederhauser	P	All
Audi	(France) Audi Sport Team Saintéloc Racing	R8 LMS Evo	25	(Germany) Markus Winkelhock	P	All
Audi	(France) Audi Sport Team Saintéloc Racing	R8 LMS Evo	25	(Germany) Christopher Haase	P	1–2
Audi	(France) Audi Sport Team Saintéloc Racing	R8 LMS Evo	25	(South Africa) Kelvin van der Linde	P	3
Audi	(France) Saintéloc Racing	R8 LMS Evo	26	(Belgium) Nicolas Baert	S	2–3
Audi	(France) Saintéloc Racing	R8 LMS Evo	26	(Switzerland) Lucas Légeret	S	2–3
Audi	(France) Saintéloc Racing	R8 LMS Evo	26	(France) Aurélien Panis	S	2
Audi	(France) Saintéloc Racing	R8 LMS Evo	26	(France) Simon Gachet	S	3
Audi	(Belgium) Team WRT	R8 LMS Evo	30	(Argentina) Franco Colapinto	S	1
Audi	(Belgium) Team WRT	R8 LMS Evo	30	(Germany) Benjamin Goethe	S	1
Audi	(Belgium) Team WRT	R8 LMS Evo	30	(United Kingdom) James Pull	S	1
Audi	(Belgium) Team WRT	R8 LMS Evo	31	(United Kingdom) Frank Bird	S	1
Audi	(Belgium) Team WRT	R8 LMS Evo	31	(Japan) Ryuichiro Tomita	S	1
Audi	(Belgium) Team WRT	R8 LMS Evo	31	(Denmark) Valdemar Eriksen	S	1
Audi	(Belgium) Audi Sport Team WRT	R8 LMS Evo	32	(Belgium) Charles Weerts	P	All
Audi	(Belgium) Audi Sport Team WRT	R8 LMS Evo	32	(Belgium) Dries Vanthoor	P	1–2
Audi	(Belgium) Audi Sport Team WRT	R8 LMS Evo	32	(South Africa) Kelvin van der Linde	P	1
Audi	(Belgium) Audi Sport Team WRT	R8 LMS Evo	32	(Germany) Christopher Mies	P	2
Audi	(Belgium) Audi Sport Team WRT	R8 LMS Evo	32	(Italy) Mattia Drudi	P	3
Audi	(Belgium) Audi Sport Team WRT	R8 LMS Evo	32	(Germany) Christopher Haase	P	3
Audi	(Belgium) Audi Sport Team WRT	R8 LMS Evo	37	(Netherlands) Robin Frijns	P	1–2
Audi	(Belgium) Audi Sport Team WRT	R8 LMS Evo	37	(Switzerland) Nico Müller	P	1–2
Audi	(Belgium) Audi Sport Team WRT	R8 LMS Evo	37	(Denmark) Dennis Lind	P	1
Audi	(Belgium) Audi Sport Team WRT	R8 LMS Evo	37	(Italy) Mattia Drudi	P	2
Audi	(Denmark) High Class Racing with WRT	R8 LMS Evo	33	(Denmark) Michael Markussen	PA	3
Audi	(Denmark) High Class Racing with WRT	R8 LMS Evo	33	(United States) Mark Patterson	PA	3
Audi	(Denmark) High Class Racing with WRT	R8 LMS Evo	33	(Netherlands) Thierry Vermeulen	PA	3
Audi	(Germany) Audi Sport Team Attempto	R8 LMS Evo	66	(Italy) Mattia Drudi	P	1
Audi	(Germany) Audi Sport Team Attempto	R8 LMS Evo	66	(Germany) Dennis Marschall	P	1
Audi	(Germany) Audi Sport Team Attempto	R8 LMS Evo	66	(Germany) Christopher Mies	P	1
Ferrari	(Germany) Rinaldi Racing	488 GT3	33	(Chile) Benjamín Hites	S	1
Ferrari	(Germany) Rinaldi Racing	488 GT3	33	(South Africa) David Perel	S	1
Ferrari	(Germany) Rinaldi Racing	488 GT3	33	(Italy) Fabrizio Crestani	S	1
Ferrari	(Italy) Iron Lynx Motorsport Lab	488 GT3	51	(Italy) Alessandro Pier Guidi	P	1
Ferrari	(Italy) Iron Lynx Motorsport Lab	488 GT3	51	(Denmark) Nicklas Nielsen	P	1
Ferrari	(Italy) Iron Lynx Motorsport Lab	488 GT3	51	(France) Côme Ledogar	P	1
Ferrari	(Italy) Iron Lynx Motorsport Lab	488 GT3	71	(Italy) Antonio Fuoco	P	1
Ferrari	(Italy) Iron Lynx Motorsport Lab	488 GT3	71	(United Kingdom) Callum Ilott	P	1
Ferrari	(Italy) Iron Lynx Motorsport Lab	488 GT3	71	(Italy) Davide Rigon	P	1
Ferrari	(Italy) AF Corse - Francorchamps Motors	488 GT3	51	(Italy) Alessandro Pier Guidi	P	2–3
Ferrari	(Italy) AF Corse - Francorchamps Motors	488 GT3	51	(France) Côme Ledogar	P	2–3
Ferrari	(Italy) AF Corse - Francorchamps Motors	488 GT3	51	(Denmark) Nicklas Nielsen	P	2
Ferrari	(Italy) AF Corse - Francorchamps Motors	488 GT3	51	(Spain) Miguel Molina	P	3
Ferrari	(Italy) AF Corse - Francorchamps Motors	488 GT3	71	(Italy) Antonio Fuoco	P	2–3
Ferrari	(Italy) AF Corse - Francorchamps Motors	488 GT3	71	(Italy) Alessio Rovera	P	2–3
Ferrari	(Italy) AF Corse - Francorchamps Motors	488 GT3	71	(United Kingdom) Callum Ilott	P	2
Ferrari	(Italy) AF Corse - Francorchamps Motors	488 GT3	71	(Denmark) Nicklas Nielsen	P	3
Ferrari	(Italy) AF Corse	488 GT3	52	(Italy) Alessio Rovera	PA	1
Ferrari	(Italy) AF Corse	488 GT3	52	(Belgium) John Wartique	PA	1
Ferrari	(Italy) AF Corse	488 GT3	52	(Belgium) Louis Machiels	PA	1
Ferrari	(Italy) AF Corse	488 GT3	52	(Italy) Andrea Bertolini	PA	1
Ferrari	(Italy) AF Corse	488 GT3	53	(Spain) Miguel Molina	PA	1
Ferrari	(Italy) AF Corse	488 GT3	53	(United Kingdom) Duncan Cameron	PA	1
Ferrari	(Italy) AF Corse	488 GT3	53	(Italy) Rino Mastronardi	PA	1
Ferrari	(Italy) AF Corse	488 GT3	53	(Republic of Ireland) Matt Griffin	PA	1
Ferrari	(Italy) AF Corse	488 GT3	61	(United States) Conrad Grunewald	Am	2
Ferrari	(Italy) AF Corse	488 GT3	61	(United States) Mark Kvamme	Am	2
Ferrari	(Italy) AF Corse	488 GT3	61	(United States) Jean-Claude Saada	Am	2
Ferrari	(United Kingdom) SKY - Tempesta Racing	488 GT3	93	(Italy) Matteo Cressoni	PA	1
Ferrari	(United Kingdom) SKY - Tempesta Racing	488 GT3	93	(United Kingdom) Chris Froggatt	PA	1
Ferrari	(United Kingdom) SKY - Tempesta Racing	488 GT3	93	(Hong Kong) Jonathan Hui	PA	1
Ferrari	(United Kingdom) SKY - Tempesta Racing	488 GT3	93	(Italy) Eddie Cheever	PA	1
Lamborghini	(United States) K-PAX Racing	Huracán GT3 Evo	3	(Italy) Mirko Bortolotti	P	2
Lamborghini	(United States) K-PAX Racing	Huracán GT3 Evo	3	(Italy) Andrea Caldarelli	P	2
Lamborghini	(United States) K-PAX Racing	Huracán GT3 Evo	3	(South Africa) Jordan Pepper	P	2
Lamborghini	(United States) K-PAX Racing	Huracán GT3 Evo	6	(United States) Corey Lewis	P	2
Lamborghini	(United States) K-PAX Racing	Huracán GT3 Evo	6	(Italy) Marco Mapelli	P	2
Lamborghini	(United States) K-PAX Racing	Huracán GT3 Evo	6	(Italy) Giovanni Venturini	P	2
Lamborghini	(United States) TR3 Racing	Huracán GT3 Evo	10	(Italy) Giacomo Altoè	PA	2
Lamborghini	(United States) TR3 Racing	Huracán GT3 Evo	10	(United States) John Megrue	PA	2
Lamborghini	(United States) TR3 Racing	Huracán GT3 Evo	10	(United States) Bill Sweedler	PA	2
Lamborghini	(Switzerland) Emil Frey Racing	Huracán GT3 Evo	14	(Switzerland) Alex Fontana	S	1
Lamborghini	(Switzerland) Emil Frey Racing	Huracán GT3 Evo	14	(Switzerland) Rolf Ineichen	S	1
Lamborghini	(Switzerland) Emil Frey Racing	Huracán GT3 Evo	14	(Switzerland) Ricardo Feller	S	1
Lamborghini	(Switzerland) Emil Frey Racing	Huracán GT3 Evo	163	(Italy) Giacomo Altoè	P	1
Lamborghini	(Switzerland) Emil Frey Racing	Huracán GT3 Evo	163	(France) Franck Perera	P	1
Lamborghini	(Switzerland) Emil Frey Racing	Huracán GT3 Evo	163	(Spain) Albert Costa	P	1
Lamborghini	(Austria) GRT Grasser Racing Team	Huracán GT3 Evo	16	(Italy) Alberto Di Folco	S	1
Lamborghini	(Austria) GRT Grasser Racing Team	Huracán GT3 Evo	16	(Austria) Clemens Schmid	S	1
Lamborghini	(Austria) GRT Grasser Racing Team	Huracán GT3 Evo	16	(Germany) Tim Zimmermann	S	1
Lamborghini	(Austria) GRT Grasser Racing Team	Huracán GT3 Evo	16	(Italy) Kikko Galbiati	S	1
Lamborghini	(China) Orange 1 FFF Racing Team	Huracán GT3 Evo	19	(Italy) Stefano Costantini	PA	1
Lamborghini	(China) Orange 1 FFF Racing Team	Huracán GT3 Evo	19	(United Kingdom) Phil Keen	PA	1
Lamborghini	(China) Orange 1 FFF Racing Team	Huracán GT3 Evo	19	(Belgium) Bertrand Baguette	PA	1
Lamborghini	(China) Orange 1 FFF Racing Team	Huracán GT3 Evo	19	(Japan) Hiroshi Hamaguchi	PA	1
Lamborghini	(China) Orange 1 FFF Racing Team	Huracán GT3 Evo	63	(Italy) Mirko Bortolotti	P	1
Lamborghini	(China) Orange 1 FFF Racing Team	Huracán GT3 Evo	63	(Italy) Marco Mapelli	P	1
Lamborghini	(China) Orange 1 FFF Racing Team	Huracán GT3 Evo	63	(Italy) Andrea Caldarelli	P	1
Lamborghini	(United Kingdom) Barwell Motorsport	Huracán GT3 Evo	77	(United Kingdom) Sandy Mitchell	PA	1
Lamborghini	(United Kingdom) Barwell Motorsport	Huracán GT3 Evo	77	(Russia) Leo Machitski	PA	1
Lamborghini	(United Kingdom) Barwell Motorsport	Huracán GT3 Evo	77	(Portugal) Miguel Ramos	PA	1
Lamborghini	(United Kingdom) Barwell Motorsport	Huracán GT3 Evo	77	(Portugal) Henrique Chaves	PA	1
Mercedes-AMG	(Germany) Mercedes-AMG Team HRT	AMG GT3 Evo	4	(Monaco) Vincent Abril	P	1
Mercedes-AMG	(Germany) Mercedes-AMG Team HRT	AMG GT3 Evo	4	(Germany) Maro Engel	P	1
Mercedes-AMG	(Germany) Mercedes-AMG Team HRT	AMG GT3 Evo	4	(Germany) Luca Stolz	P	1
Mercedes-AMG	(Germany) Toksport WRT	AMG GT3 Evo	7	(Germany) Marvin Dienst	S	1
Mercedes-AMG	(Germany) Toksport WRT	AMG GT3 Evo	7	(Zimbabwe) Axcil Jefferies	S	1
Mercedes-AMG	(Germany) Toksport WRT	AMG GT3 Evo	7	(France) Paul Petit	S	1
Mercedes-AMG	(Germany) Toksport WRT	AMG GT3 Evo	7	(Colombia) Óscar Tunjo	S	1
Mercedes-AMG	(United States) Winward Racing	AMG GT3 Evo	33	(Germany) Marvin Dienst	S	2
Mercedes-AMG	(United States) Winward Racing	AMG GT3 Evo	33	(United Kingdom) Philip Ellis	S	2
Mercedes-AMG	(United States) Winward Racing	AMG GT3 Evo	33	(United States) Russell Ward	S	2
Mercedes-AMG	(United States) Winward Racing	AMG GT3 Evo	57	(United Kingdom) Philip Ellis	S	1
Mercedes-AMG	(United States) Winward Racing	AMG GT3 Evo	57	(Canada) Mikaël Grenier	S	1
Mercedes-AMG	(United States) Winward Racing	AMG GT3 Evo	57	(United States) Russell Ward	S	1
Mercedes-AMG	(Taiwan) HubAuto	AMG GT3 Evo	50	(Germany) Maximilian Buhk	P	1
Mercedes-AMG	(Taiwan) HubAuto	AMG GT3 Evo	50	(Netherlands) Nicky Catsburg	P	1
Mercedes-AMG	(Taiwan) HubAuto	AMG GT3 Evo	50	(Germany) Maximilian Götz	P	1
Mercedes-AMG	(Australia) SunEnergy1 Racing	AMG GT3 Evo	75	(Canada) Mikaël Grenier	PA	2–3
Mercedes-AMG	(Australia) SunEnergy1 Racing	AMG GT3 Evo	75	(Australia) Kenny Habul	PA	2–3
Mercedes-AMG	(Australia) SunEnergy1 Racing	AMG GT3 Evo	75	(Austria) Martin Konrad	PA	2–3
Mercedes-AMG	(France) Mercedes-AMG Team AKKA ASP	AMG GT3 Evo	88	(France) Jules Gounon	P	1
Mercedes-AMG	(France) Mercedes-AMG Team AKKA ASP	AMG GT3 Evo	88	(Spain) Daniel Juncadella	P	1
Mercedes-AMG	(France) Mercedes-AMG Team AKKA ASP	AMG GT3 Evo	88	(Italy) Raffaele Marciello	P	1
Mercedes-AMG	(France) Mercedes-AMG Team AKKA ASP	AMG GT3 Evo	89	(Russia) Timur Boguslavskiy	P	All
Mercedes-AMG	(France) Mercedes-AMG Team AKKA ASP	AMG GT3 Evo	89	(Austria) Lucas Auer	P	1
Mercedes-AMG	(France) Mercedes-AMG Team AKKA ASP	AMG GT3 Evo	89	(Brazil) Felipe Fraga	P	1
Mercedes-AMG	(France) Mercedes-AMG Team AKKA ASP	AMG GT3 Evo	89	(Spain) Daniel Juncadella	P	2
Mercedes-AMG	(France) Mercedes-AMG Team AKKA ASP	AMG GT3 Evo	89	(Italy) Raffaele Marciello	P	2–3
Mercedes-AMG	(France) Mercedes-AMG Team AKKA ASP	AMG GT3 Evo	89	(France) Jules Gounon	P	3
Mercedes-AMG	(Hong Kong) Mercedes-AMG Team Craft-Bamboo Racing	AMG GT3 Evo	99	(Germany) Maro Engel	P	2
Mercedes-AMG	(Hong Kong) Mercedes-AMG Team Craft-Bamboo Racing	AMG GT3 Evo	99	(France) Jules Gounon	P	2
Mercedes-AMG	(Hong Kong) Mercedes-AMG Team Craft-Bamboo Racing	AMG GT3 Evo	99	(Germany) Luca Stolz	P	2
Porsche	(Germany) Schnabl Engineering	911 GT3 R	3	(Denmark) Michael Christensen	P	1
Porsche	(Germany) Schnabl Engineering	911 GT3 R	3	(France) Frédéric Makowiecki	P	1
Porsche	(Germany) Schnabl Engineering	911 GT3 R	3	(Norway) Dennis Olsen	P	1
Porsche	(Malaysia) EBM Giga Racing	911 GT3 R	16	(United States) Nicholas Boulle	PA	2
Porsche	(Malaysia) EBM Giga Racing	911 GT3 R	16	(Malaysia) Adrian d'Silva	PA	2
Porsche	(Malaysia) EBM Giga Racing	911 GT3 R	16	(Canada) Jeff Kinglsey	PA	2
Porsche	(United States) Wright Motorsports	911 GT3 R	20	(Belgium) Jan Heylen	S	2
Porsche	(United States) Wright Motorsports	911 GT3 R	20	(United States) Fred Poordad	S	2
Porsche	(United States) Wright Motorsports	911 GT3 R	20	(United States) Max Root	S	2
Porsche	(United Arab Emirates) GPX Martini Racing	911 GT3 R	22	(New Zealand) Earl Bamber	P	1
Porsche	(United Arab Emirates) GPX Martini Racing	911 GT3 R	22	(Australia) Matt Campbell	P	1
Porsche	(United Arab Emirates) GPX Martini Racing	911 GT3 R	22	(France) Mathieu Jaminet	P	1
Porsche	(Germany) Huber Motorsport	911 GT3 R	23	(Switzerland) Ivan Jacoma	Am	1
Porsche	(Germany) Huber Motorsport	911 GT3 R	23	(Switzerland) Nicolas Leutwiler	Am	1
Porsche	(Germany) Huber Motorsport	911 GT3 R	23	(Germany) Nico Menzel	Am	1
Porsche	(Germany) Huber Motorsport	911 GT3 R	23	(Germany) Jacob Schell	Am	1
Porsche	(United States) GMG Racing	911 GT3 R	34	(Norway) Dennis Olsen	PA	2
Porsche	(United States) GMG Racing	911 GT3 R	34	(United States) James Sofronas	PA	2
Porsche	(United States) GMG Racing	911 GT3 R	34	(United States) Kyle Washington	PA	2
Porsche	(Hong Kong) KCMG	911 GT3 R	47	(Belgium) Maxime Martin	P	1
Porsche	(Hong Kong) KCMG	911 GT3 R	47	(United Kingdom) Nick Tandy	P	1
Porsche	(Hong Kong) KCMG	911 GT3 R	47	(Belgium) Laurens Vanthoor	P	1
Porsche	(Italy) Dinamic Motorsport	911 GT3 R	54	(Austria) Klaus Bachler	P	1
Porsche	(Italy) Dinamic Motorsport	911 GT3 R	54	(Germany) Christian Engelhart	P	1
Porsche	(Italy) Dinamic Motorsport	911 GT3 R	54	(Italy) Matteo Cairoli	P	1
Porsche	(Germany) Herberth Motorsport	911 GT3 R	911	(Hong Kong) Antares Au	PA	1
Porsche	(Germany) Herberth Motorsport	911 GT3 R	911	(Switzerland) Daniel Allemann	PA	1
Porsche	(Germany) Herberth Motorsport	911 GT3 R	911	(Germany) Alfred Renauer	PA	1
Porsche	(Germany) Herberth Motorsport	911 GT3 R	911	(Germany) Robert Renauer	PA	1

Icon	Class
P	Pro Cup
S	Silver Cup
PA	Pro-Am Cup
Am	Am Cup

Intercontinental GT Pro-Am Challenge
Manufacturer	Team	Car	No.	Drivers	Class	Rounds
Porsche	(Malaysia) EBM Giga Racing	911 GT3 R	16	(United States) Nicholas Boulle	PA	2
Porsche	(Malaysia) EBM Giga Racing	911 GT3 R	16	(Malaysia) Adrian d'Silva	PA	2
Porsche	(Malaysia) EBM Giga Racing	911 GT3 R	16	(Canada) Jeff Kinglsey	PA	2
Porsche	(Malaysia) EBM Giga Racing	911 GT3 R	61	(Germany) Wolfgang Triller	PA	1
Porsche	(Malaysia) EBM Giga Racing	911 GT3 R	61	(New Zealand) Reid Harker	PA	1
Porsche	(Malaysia) EBM Giga Racing	911 GT3 R	61	(New Zealand) Will Bamber	PA	1
Porsche	(Malaysia) EBM Giga Racing	911 GT3 R	61	(Luxembourg) Carlos Rivas	PA	1
McLaren	(United Kingdom) Inception Racing	McLaren 720S GT3	70	(United Kingdom) Ollie Millroy	PA	1–2
McLaren	(United Kingdom) Inception Racing	McLaren 720S GT3	70	(United States) Brendan Iribe	PA	1–2
McLaren	(United Kingdom) Inception Racing	McLaren 720S GT3	70	(United States) Kevin Madsen	PA	1–2
McLaren	(United Kingdom) Inception Racing	McLaren 720S GT3	70	(South Africa) Jordan Pepper	PA	1

== Race results ==
Rnd.	Circuit	Pole position	IGTC Winners	Winning Manufacturer	Ref.
1	(Belgium) Spa-Francorchamps	(France) No. 88 Mercedes-AMG Team AKKA ASP	(Italy) No. 51 Iron Lynx Motorsport Lab	(Italy) Ferrari	
1	(Belgium) Spa-Francorchamps	(France) Jules Gounon (Spain) Daniel Juncadella (Italy) Raffaele Marciello	(Italy) Alessandro Pier Guidi (Denmark) Nicklas Nielsen (France) Côme Ledogar	(Italy) Ferrari	
2	(United States) Indianapolis	(Italy) No. 51 AF Corse - Francorchamps Motors	(France) No. 25 Audi Sport Team Saintéloc Racing	(Germany) Audi	
2	(United States) Indianapolis	(Italy) Alessandro Pier Guidi (Denmark) Nicklas Nielsen (France) Côme Ledogar	(Germany) Christopher Haase (Switzerland) Patric Niederhauser (Germany) Markus Winkelhock	(Germany) Audi	
3	(South Africa) Kyalami	(France) No. 89 Mercedes-AMG Team AKKA ASP	(France) No. 89 Mercedes-AMG Team AKKA ASP	(Germany) Mercedes	
3	(South Africa) Kyalami	(France) Jules Gounon (Russia) Timur Boguslavskiy (Italy) Raffaele Marciello	(France) Jules Gounon (Russia) Timur Boguslavskiy (Italy) Raffaele Marciello	(Germany) Mercedes	

== Championship standings ==
Scoring System

Championship points were awarded for the first ten positions in each race. Entries were required to complete 75% of the winning car's race distance in order to be classified and earn points. Individual drivers were required to participate for a minimum of 25 minutes in order to earn championship points in any race. A manufacturer only received points for its two highest placed cars in each round.

Position	1st	2nd	3rd	4th	5th	6th	7th	8th	9th	10th
Points	25	18	15	12	10	8	6	4	2	1

=== Driver's championship ===
The results indicate the classification relative to other drivers in the series, not the classification in the race.

Pos.	Driver	Manufacturer	SPA (Belgium)	IND (United States)	KYA (South Africa)	Points
1	(France) Côme Ledogar (Italy) Alessandro Pier Guidi	Ferrari	1	**4**	2	55
2	(Switzerland) Patric Niederhauser (Germany) Markus Winkelhock	Audi	5	1	3	50
3	(Russia) Timur Boguslavskiy	Mercedes-AMG	8	2	**1**	47
4	(Germany) Christopher Haase	Audi	5	1	4	47
5	(Italy) Raffaele Marciello	Mercedes-AMG	**Ret**	2	**1**	43
6	(Belgium) Charles Weerts	Audi	2	5	4	40
7	(Denmark) Nicklas Nielsen	Ferrari	1	**4**	Ret	37
8	(South Africa) Kelvin van der Linde	Audi	2		3	33
9	(Belgium) Dries Vanthoor	Audi	2	5		28
10	(France) Jules Gounon	Mercedes-AMG	**Ret**	13	**1**	25
11	(Italy) Mirko Bortolotti (Italy) Andrea Caldarelli	Lamborghini	6	3		23
12	(Spain) Miguel Molina	Ferrari	10		2	19
13	(Italy) Mattia Drudi	Audi	7	10	4	19
14	(Spain) Daniel Juncadella	Mercedes-AMG	**Ret**	2		18
15	(Belgium) Nicolas Baert (Switzerland) Lucas Légeret	Audi		6	5	18
16	(Netherlands) Robin Frijns (Switzerland) Nico Müller	Audi	3	10		16
17	(Germany) Christopher Mies	Audi	7	5		16
18	(Denmark) Dennis Lind	Audi	3			15
19	(South Africa) Jordan Pepper	Lamborghini		3		15
20	(Italy) Marco Mapelli	Lamborghini	6	7		14
21	(Belgium) Maxime Martin (United Kingdom) Nick Tandy (Belgium) Laurens Vanthoor	Porsche	4			12
22	(France) Simon Gachet	Audi			5	10
23	(Canada) Mikaël Grenier	Mercedes-AMG	Ret	8	7	10
24	(Australia) Kenny Habul (Austria) Martin Konrad	Mercedes-AMG		8	7	10
25	(France) Aurélien Panis	Audi		6		8
26	(Denmark) Michael Markussen (United States) Mark Patterson (Netherlands) Thierry Vermeulen	Audi			6	8
27	(Germany) Dennis Marschall	Audi	7			6
28	(United States) Corey Lewis (Italy) Giovanni Venturini	Lamborghini		7		6
29	(Austria) Lucas Auer (Brazil) Felipe Fraga	Mercedes-AMG	8			4
30	(Norway) Dennis Olsen	Porsche	Ret	9		2
31	(Germany) Marvin Dienst	Mercedes-AMG	9	Ret		2
32	(Zimbabwe) Axcil Jefferies (France) Paul Petit (Colombia) Oscar Tunjo	Mercedes-AMG	9			2
33	(United States) James Sofronas (United States) Kyle Washington	Porsche		9		2
34	(United Kingdom) Duncan Cameron (Republic of Ireland) Matt Griffin (Italy) Rino Mastronardi	Ferrari	10			1
	(Italy) Alessio Rovera	Ferrari	11	14	Ret	0
	(Italy) Giacomo Altoè	Lamborghini	Ret	11		0
	(Italy) Andrea Bertolini (Belgium) Louis Machiels (Belgium) John Wartique	Ferrari	11			0
	(United States) John Megrue (United States) Bill Sweedler	Lamborghini		11		0
	(Portugal) Henrique Chaves (Russia) Leo Machitski (United Kingdom) Sandy Mitchell (Portugal) Miguel Ramos	Lamborghini	12			0
	(United States) Conrad Grunewald (United States) Mark Kvamme (United States) Jean-Claude Saada	Lamborghini		12		0
	(Germany) Maro Engel (Germany) Luca Stolz	Mercedes-AMG	19	13		0
	(Italy) Eddie Cheever (Italy) Matteo Cressoni (United Kingdom) Chris Froggatt (Hong Kong) Jonathan Hui	Ferrari	13			0
	(Italy) Antonio Fuoco	Ferrari	Ret	14	Ret	0
	(United Kingdom) Callum Ilott	Ferrari	Ret	14		0
	(Argentina) Franco Colapinto (Germany) Benjamin Goethe (United Kingdom) James Pull	Audi	14			0
	(United Kingdom) Frank Bird (Denmark) Valdemar Eriksen (Japan) Ryuichiro Tomita	Audi	15			0
	(Switzerland) Daniel Allemann (Hong Kong) Antares Au (Germany) Alfred Renauer (Germany) Robert Renauer	Porsche	16			0
	(Italy) Fabrizio Crestani (Chile) Benjamín Hites (South Africa) David Perel	Ferrari	17			0
	(Switzerland) Ricardo Feller (Switzerland) Alex Fontana (Switzerland) Rolf Ineichen	Lamborghini	18			0
	(Monaco) Vincent Abril	Mercedes-AMG	19			0
	(Germany) Maximilian Buhk (New Zealand) Nicky Catsburg (Germany) Maximilian Götz	Mercedes-AMG	20			0
	(Switzerland) Ivan Jacoma (Switzerland) Nicolas Leutwiler (Germany) Nico Menzel (Germany) Jacob Schell	Porsche	21			0
	(United Kingdom) Philip Ellis (United States) Russell Ward	Mercedes-AMG	Ret	Ret		0
	(Italy) Kikko Galbiati (Italy) Alberto Di Folco (Austria) Clemens Schmid (Germany) Tim Zimmermann	Lamborghini	Ret			0
	(Austria) Klaus Bachler (Italy) Matteo Cairoli (Germany) Christian Engelhart	Porsche	Ret			0
	(Denmark) Michael Christensen (France) Frédéric Makowiecki	Porsche	Ret			0
	(New Zealand) Earl Bamber (Australia) Matt Campbell (France) Mathieu Jaminet	Porsche	Ret			0
	(Belgium) Bertrand Baguette (Italy) Stefano Costantini (Japan) Hiroshi Hamaguchi (United Kingdom) Phil Keen	Lamborghini	Ret			0
	(Spain) Albert Costa (France) Franck Perera	Lamborghini	Ret			0
	(Italy) Davide Rigon	Ferrari	Ret			0
	(Belgium) Jan Heylen (United States) Fred Poordad (United States) Max Root	Porsche		Ret		0
Pos.	Driver	Manufacturer	SPA (Belgium)	IND (United States)	KYA (South Africa)	Points

Colour	Result
Gold	Winner
Silver	Second place
Bronze	Third place
Green	Points classification
Blue	Non-points classification
Blue	Non-classified finish (NC)
Purple	Retired, not classified (Ret)
Red	Did not qualify (DNQ)
Red	Did not pre-qualify (DNPQ)
Black	Disqualified (DSQ)
White	Did not start (DNS)
White	Withdrew (WD)
White	Race cancelled (C)
Blank	Did not practice (DNP)
Blank	Did not arrive (DNA)
Blank	Excluded (EX)

**Bold** – Pole
Italics – Fastest Lap

== See also ==
- 2021 GT World Challenge Europe
- 2021 GT World Challenge Europe Sprint Cup
- 2021 GT World Challenge Europe Endurance Cup
- 2021 GT World Challenge America
- 2021 GT World Challenge Asia
- 2021 GT World Challenge Australia
