= Lucas Légeret =

Swiss racing driver (born 2001)

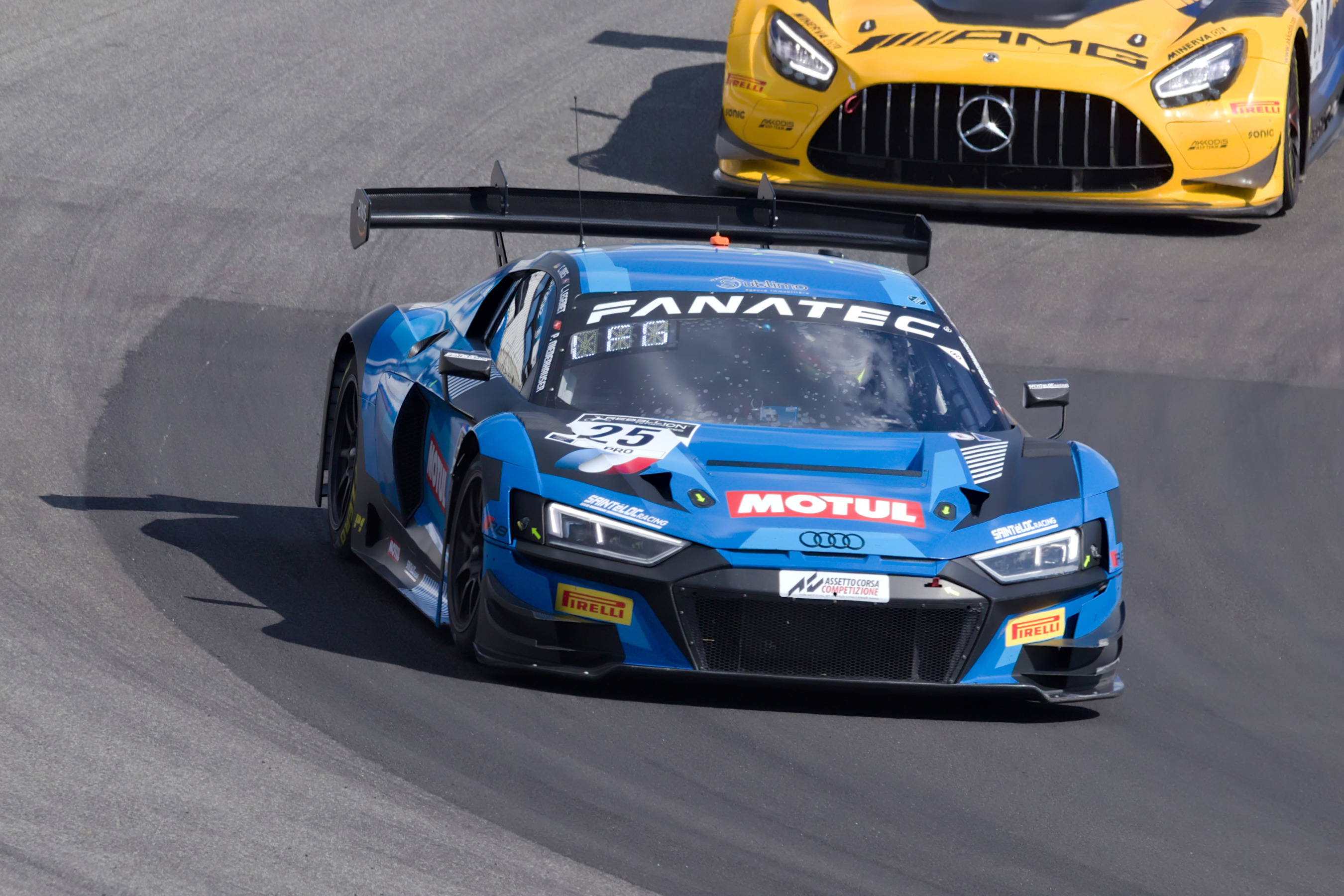
- Légeret in 2022
- Nationality: (Switzerland) Swiss
- Born: 10 May 2001 (age 25) Vevey, Switzerland

GT World Challenge Europe Sprint Cup career
- Debut season: 2022
- Current team: CSA Racing
- Categorisation: FIA Bronze (2017); FIA Silver (2018–)
- Car number: 111
- Starts: 16 (16 entries)
- Wins: 0
- Podiums: 2
- Poles: 0
- Fastest laps: 0
- Best finish: 6th in 2023

Lucas Légeret (born 10 May 2001) is a Swiss racing driver currently competing in the Gold Cup class of the GT World Challenge Europe Sprint Cup with CSA Racing.

Having driven karts from the age of nine, Légeret made his car racing debut in the LMP3 category in 2017, where he scored his first victories in the V de V Endurance Series. Following three seasons spent competing in the European Le Mans Series, the Swiss driver moved to the world of GT3 racing. Since then, he has competed intermittently in the GT World Challenge Europe Endurance and Sprint Cups, scoring a career-high Endurance Cup win at Hockenheim in 2022 in a Saintéloc Audi he shared with Christopher Mies and Patric Niederhauser. He has thus far scored two overall podiums in the Sprint Cup, both coming in 2023 with Comtoyou Racing alongside Christopher Haase.

Légeret competed at the 2020 24 Hours of Le Mans, driving for Dempsey-Proton Racing in the LMGTE Am class. He finished tenth in the category.

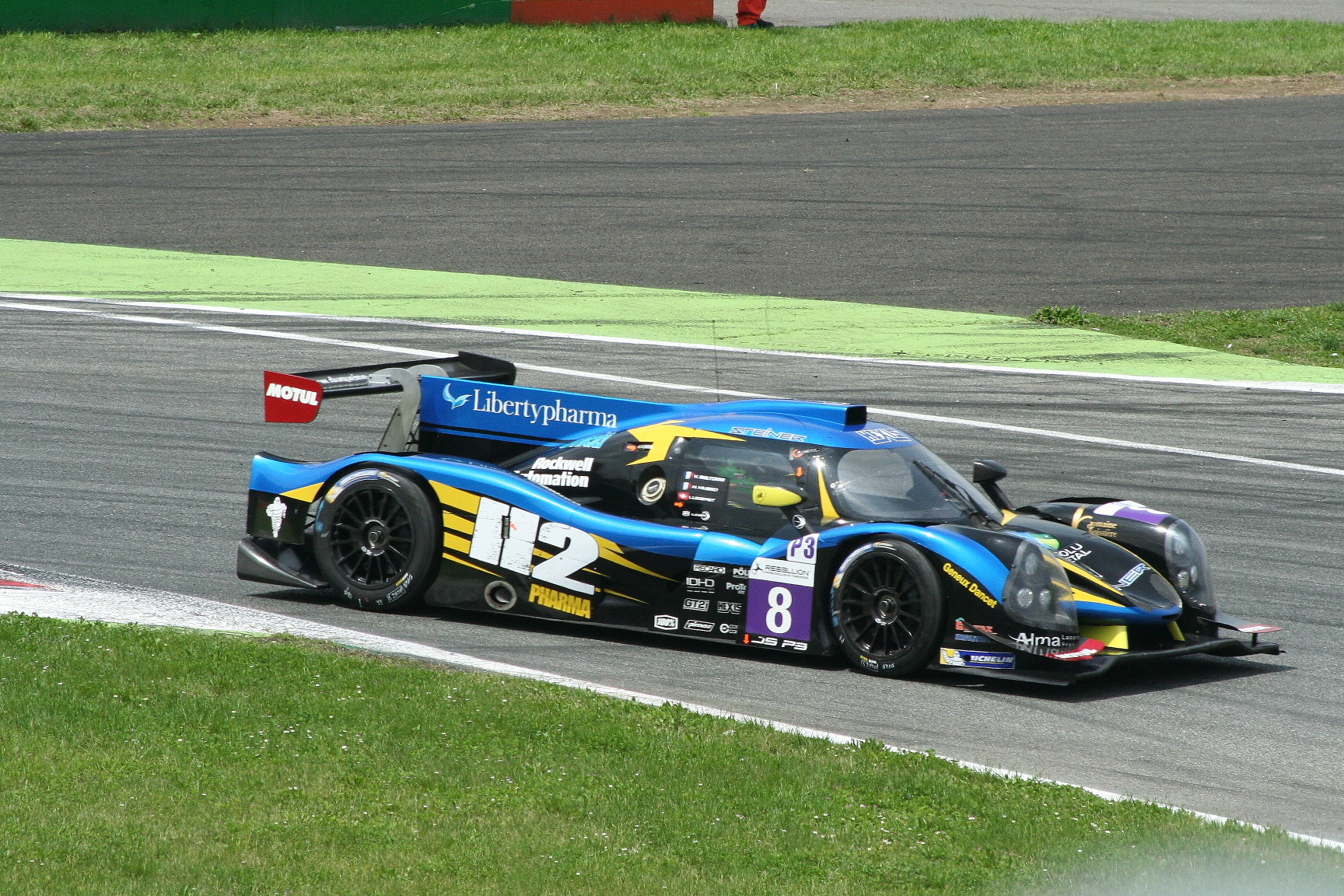
Légeret during his LMP3 days in 2017.

== Racing record ==
=== Career summary ===
Season	Series	Team	Races	Wins	Poles	F/Laps	Podiums	Points	Position
2017	European Le Mans Series - LMP3	Duqueine Engineering	5	0	0	0	0	2.5	23rd
2017	V de V Endurance Series - LMP3	Duqueine Engineering	5	2	0	0	3	156.5	7th
2017	Le Mans Cup - LMP3	Duqueine Engineering	2	0	0	0	0	0.5	42nd
2018	European Le Mans Series - LMP3	M.Racing - YMR	6	0	1	0	1	27.5	10th
2019	European Le Mans Series - LMP3	M Racing	6	0	2	2	0	21.5	11th
2019–20	FIA World Endurance Championship - LMGTE Am	Dempsey-Proton Racing	1	0	0	0	0	10	29th
2020	GT World Challenge Europe Endurance Cup	AKKA ASP Team	4	0	0	0	0	0	NC
2020	GT World Challenge Europe Endurance Cup - Silver	AKKA ASP Team	4	0	0	1	0	32	11th
2020	Intercontinental GT Challenge	AKKA ASP Team	1	0	0	0	0	0	NC
2020	24 Hours of Le Mans - LMGTE Am	Dempsey-Proton Racing	1	0	0	0	0	N/A	10th
2021	GT World Challenge Europe Endurance Cup	Saintéloc Racing	1	0	0	0	0	0	NC
2021	GT World Challenge Europe Endurance Cup - Silver	Saintéloc Racing	1	0	0	0	0	1	33rd
2021	Intercontinental GT Challenge	Saintéloc Racing	2	0	0	0	0	18	15th
2021	European Le Mans Series - LMP3	Saintéloc Racing	1	0	0	0	0	0	NC†
2022	GT World Challenge Europe Endurance Cup	Saintéloc Junior Team	5	1	0	0	1	33	13th
2022	GT World Challenge Europe Sprint Cup	Saintéloc Junior Team	2	0	0	0	0	3	22nd
2022	GT World Challenge Europe Sprint Cup - Silver	Saintéloc Junior Team	2	0	0	0	1	19.5	11th
2022	Intercontinental GT Challenge	Saintéloc Junior Team	2	0	0	0	0	0	NC
2022	24H GT Series - GT3	Saintéloc Racing	1	0	0	1	1	0	NC†
2023	GT World Challenge Europe Sprint Cup	Comtoyou Racing	10	0	0	0	2	50	6th
2023	GT World Challenge Europe Endurance Cup	CSA Racing	1	0	0	0	0	0	NC
2023	GT World Challenge Europe Endurance Cup	Comtoyou Racing	1	0	0	0	0	0	NC
2023	GT World Challenge Europe Endurance Cup - Bronze	CSA Racing	1	0	0	0	0	0	NC
2023	GT World Challenge Europe Endurance Cup - Silver	Comtoyou Racing	1	0	0	0	1	33	11th
2024	GT World Challenge Europe Sprint Cup	CSA Racing	10	0	0	0	0	12.5	14th
2024	GT World Challenge Europe Sprint Cup - Gold	CSA Racing	10	2	4	2	7	97.5	**3rd**
2024	GT World Challenge Europe Endurance Cup	Saintéloc Racing	1	0	0	0	0	0	NC
2025	GT World Challenge Europe Endurance Cup	Saintéloc Racing	1	0	0	0	0	0	NC
2025	French GT4 Cup - Pro-Am	Saintéloc Racing	4	0	0	0	0	0	NC
2026	GT World Challenge Europe Endurance Cup	Saintéloc Racing	1	0	0	0	0	0	NC
2026	GT World Challenge Europe Endurance Cup	Walkenhorst Motorsport	1	0	0	0	0	0	NC
2026	McLaren Trophy Europe	CSA Racing	3	0	1	0	1	7*	15th*

^{†} As Légeret was a guest driver, he was ineligible for championship points.
^{*} Season still in progress.

=== Complete European Le Mans Series results ===
Year	Team	Class	Car	Engine	1	2	3	4	5	6	Pos.	Points
2017	Duqueine Engineering	LMP3	Ligier JS P3	Nissan VK50VE 5.0 L V8	SIL	MNZ; 13	RBR; 11				23rd	2.5
2017	Duqueine Engineering	LMP3	Norma M30	Nissan VK50VE 5.0 L V8				LEC; NC	SPA; 13	ALG; 10	23rd	2.5
2018	M.Racing - YMR	LMP3	Norma M30	Nissan VK50VE 5.0 L V8	**LEC**; 2	MNZ; 13	RBR; Ret	SIL; 8	SPA; 8‡	**ALG**; 10	10th	27.5
2019	M Racing	LMP3	Norma M30	Nissan VK50VE 5.0 L V8	LEC; 9	**MNZ**; 5	CAT; 11	**SIL**; 8	SPA; Ret	**ALG**; 9	11th	21.5
2021	Saintéloc Racing	LMP3	Ligier JS P320	Nissan VK56DE 5.6L V8	CAT	RBR	LEC	MNZ	SPA	ALG; 5	NC†	0

† As Légeret was a guest driver, he was ineligible for points

=== Complete GT World Challenge Europe results ===
==== GT World Challenge Europe Endurance Cup ====
Year	Team	Car	Class	1	2	3	4	5	6	7	Pos.	Points
2020	AKKA ASP Team	Mercedes-AMG GT3	Silver	IMO; 38	NÜR; 38	SPA; 6H; 27	SPA; 12H; 39	**SPA**; **24H**; 29	LEC; 21		11th	32
2021	Saintéloc Junior Team	Audi R8 LMS Evo	Silver	MNZ	LEC	SPA; 6H; 45	SPA; 12H; 30	SPA; 24H; 29	NÜR	CAT	33rd	1
2022	Saintéloc Junior Team	Audi R8 LMS Evo II	Pro	IMO; 9	LEC; Ret	SPA; 6H; 16	SPA; 12H; 28	SPA; 24H; 19	HOC; 1	BAR; 7	13th	33
2023	CSA Racing	Audi R8 LMS Evo II	Bronze	MNZ	LEC; 38						NC	0
2023	Comtoyou Racing	Audi R8 LMS Evo II	Silver			SPA; 6H; 33	SPA; 12H; 22	SPA; 24H; 19	NÜR	CAT	11th	33
2024	Saintéloc Racing	Audi R8 LMS Evo II	Silver	LEC	SPA; 6H	SPA; 12H	SPA; 24H	NÜR	MNZ	**JED**; 13	16th	34
2025	Saintéloc Racing	Audi R8 LMS Evo II	Silver	LEC; 22	MNZ	SPA; 6H	SPA; 12H	SPA; 24H	NÜR	CAT	22nd	19
2026	Saintéloc Racing	Audi R8 LMS Evo II	Silver	LEC	MNZ	SPA; 6H; 25	SPA; 12H; 40	SPA; 24H; 30	NÜR		27th	11
2026	Walkenhorst Motorsport	Aston Martin Vantage AMR GT3 Evo	Silver							ALG; 45	27th	11

==== GT World Challenge Europe Sprint Cup ====
(key) (Races in bold indicate pole position) (Races in italics indicate fastest lap)

Year	Team	Car	Class	1	2	3	4	5	6	7	8	9	10	Pos.	Points
2022	Saintéloc Junior Team	Audi R8 LMS Evo II	Silver	BRH; 1	BRH; 2	MAG; 1	MAG; 2	ZAN; 1	ZAN; 2	MIS; 1; 7	MIS; 2; 11	VAL; 1	VAL; 2	11th	19.5
2023	Comtoyou Racing	Audi R8 LMS Evo II	Pro	BRH; 1; 4	BRH; 2; 5	MIS; 1; 9	MIS; 2; 2	HOC; 1; 7	HOC; 2; 2	VAL; 1; 4	VAL; 2; 9	ZAN; 1 Ret	ZAN; 2; 12	6th	50
2024	CSA Racing	Audi R8 LMS Evo II	Gold	**BRH**; **1**; 9	BRH; 2; 13	**MIS**; **1**; 32	**MIS**; **2**; 11	HOC; 1; 13	HOC; 2; 9	MAG; 1; 7	MAG; 2; 7	CAT; 1; 6	**CAT**; **2**; 28	3rd	97.5

^{*}Season still in progress.

=== Complete 24 Hours of Le Mans results ===
Year	Team	Co-Drivers	Car	Class	Laps	Pos.	Class Pos.
2020	(Germany) Dempsey-Proton Racing	(France) Julien Andlauer (Thailand) Vutthikorn Inthraphuvasak	Porsche 911 RSR	GTE; Am	331	36th	10th
