= Edoardo Mortara =

Swiss-Italian racing driver (born 1987)

- Mortara at the 2024 6 Hours of Fuji
- Nationality: (Switzerland) Swiss (Italy) Italian (Note: Mortara, a dual citizen, competed under an Italian racing licence in his junior career, and later in DTM and WEC. He represents Switzerland in Formula E.)
- Born: Edoardo Alberto Gérard Mortara; 12 January 1987 (age 39) Geneva, Switzerland

Formula E career
- Debut season: 2017–18
- Current team: Mahindra Racing
- Categorisation: FIA Platinum
- Car number: 48
- Former teams: ROKiT Venturi Racing, Maserati MSG Racing
- Starts: 116
- Championships: 0
- Wins: 6
- Podiums: 18
- Poles: 6
- Fastest laps: 2
- Best finish: 2nd in 2020–21
- Finished last season: 5th (137 pts)

Previous series
- 2011–18 2007–10 2009 2009 2008–09 2006 2006: DTM; Formula Three Euroseries; GP2 Series; Formula Renault 3.5 Series; GP2 Asia Series; Formula Renault 2.0 Eurocup; Formula Renault 2.0 Italia

Championship titles
- 2010: Formula 3 Euro Series

Awards
- 2009 2010 2011 2012 2013 2017: Macau Grand Prix; Macau Grand Prix; Macau GT Cup; Macau GT Cup; Macau GT Cup; FIA GT World Cup
- Statistics up to date as of 26 May 2025.

Edoardo Alberto Gérard "Edo" Mortara (born 12 January 1987) is a Swiss-Italian-French professional racing driver currently competing in Formula E for Mahindra Racing and in the IMSA SportsCar Championship for Automobili Lamborghini Squadra Corse. Born in Geneva, Switzerland, he holds triple nationality from all three countries. He is a former Formula Three Euroseries champion and he almost claimed the DTM title with Audi in 2016. In 2021 and 2022, he finished in second and then third overall in the FIA Formula E World Companionship.

Mortara is renowned as "Mr Macau" as he has amassed ten wins (with seven overall victories) in Macau from 2008 to 2017 in F3 and GT races. These wins include 2008 F3 Qualification Race, 2009 F3 Main Race, 2010 F3 Qualification Race and Main Race, 2011, 2012, 2013 Macau GT Races, 2013 Audi R8 LMS Race and 2017 Macau GT World Cup Qualification Race and Main Race. This is a record for any driver or rider in Macau up to date.

Mortara was also ranked 38th and 15th by the famous "Autosport" magazine as one of the top-50 drivers in the world in 2021 and 2022 respectively.

== Early career ==
=== Karting and lower formulae ===
Mortara began racing in karts, where he won the 2002 South Garda Winter Cup and 2005 Andrea Margutti Trophy. In 2006, Mortara stepped up to formula racing, driving for Prema Powerteam in both the Formula Renault Eurocup and Formula Renault 2.0 Italia series. He scored on two occasions in the former, finishing 22nd in the drivers' standings, and claimed three podiums in the latter to finish fourth overall.

=== Formula 3 Euro Series (2007–2008) ===
In 2007, Mortara joined Signature-Plus in the Formula 3 Euro Series. After scoring his maiden car racing victory during round two at Brands Hatch, Mortara took three more podiums, including another win in a rain-affected race 1 at Barcelona. He ended up eighth in the standings and won the rookie classification. Mortara returned to Signature for his sophomore season in 2008. Despite a strong start to his campaign, which included a victory at Pau and a total of six podiums from the opening eight races, Mortara tailed off in the campaign's second half, allowing Nico Hülkenberg to take a dominant title. Mortara narrowly beat Jules Bianchi to second in the championship. He also took part in the 2008 Macau Grand Prix, where he won the qualification race after passing Keisuke Kunimoto, before losing out to Kunimoto in the main race and finishing second.

=== GP2 step-up and Macau victories (2009–2010) ===
Having contested the latter four events of the GP2 Asia Series at the start of 2009, scoring a podium on his debut in Bahrain, Mortara joined Arden International in the 2009 GP2 Series. Despite winning the first sprint race of the year at Barcelona, Mortara only claimed a total of five points finishes across the season and finished 14th overall. At the end of 2009, Mortara returned to Formula Three to race at the Macau Grand Prix with Signature. Having qualified fourth, Mortara finished third in the qualification race. Mortara then won the main race, passing Jean-Karl Vernay in the closing laps.

Mortara returned to the Formula 3 Euro Series in 2010 with Signature. A dominant campaign followed, as Mortara won seven of the higher-points-awarding Saturday races and claimed the championship title. He capped off his junior single-seater career by winning the 2010 Macau Grand Prix, where he qualified first, dominated the qualification race, and claimed the main race win after overtaking Laurens Vanthoor. With that achievement, he became the first ever driver to win the Macau Grand Prix in successive years during the Formula Three era.

== DTM career ==
=== Audi (2011–2016) ===
For 2011, Mortara joined Audi Team Rosberg in the Deutsche Tourenwagen Masters, driving the older Audi A4 DTM 2008 chassis. He scored his maiden points with a sixth place in round two at Zandvoort. After winning the exhibition qualifying race at the Munich Olympic Stadium, Mortara claimed his first podium in the championship by finishing third at Brands Hatch. He returned to the podium during the next race in Oschersleben, placing third again in a wet-affected race. Mortara finished ninth in the drivers' standings.

Mortara remained with Team Rosberg for the 2012 season. After scoring points from two of the opening three races, Mortara achieved pole position at the Red Bull Ring, before going on to achieve his first DTM victory after fighting off the Mercedes of Gary Paffett. Mortara took his next podium at the Nürburgring, finishing second to a dominant Bruno Spengler. At the following race, a wet-weather affair at Zandvoort, Mortara battled past marque colleague Mike Rockenfeller in the closing laps and scored his second win of the season. Mortara then retired from two of the final three races, which included a lap 1 crash with Ralf Schumacher at Oschersleben caused by Mortara, and finished fifth in the championship.

In 2013, Mortara returned for a third and final year with Team Rosberg. He experienced a challenging campaign, finishing 21st in the standings with just three points to his name.

Ahead of the 2014 season, Mortara moved to Audi Sport Team Abt. Having retired from the season opener at the Hockenheimring due to a late puncture, Mortara returned to the podium in round two at Oschersleben with a third place. He finished fourth in the next two races, before taking ninth in Moscow after lap 1 contact with Jamie Green and 16th at Spielberg. Mortara then qualified second at the Nürburgring before finishing third. A 16th place at the Lausitzring was followed by fourth in Zandvoort, where Mortara recovered from being disqualified from qualifying for a technical infringement. Mortara's slim chances of finishing second in the drivers' championship were ended at the Hockenheim finale, where a bad start and subsequent collision damage caused him to retire. He ended up fifth in the standings.

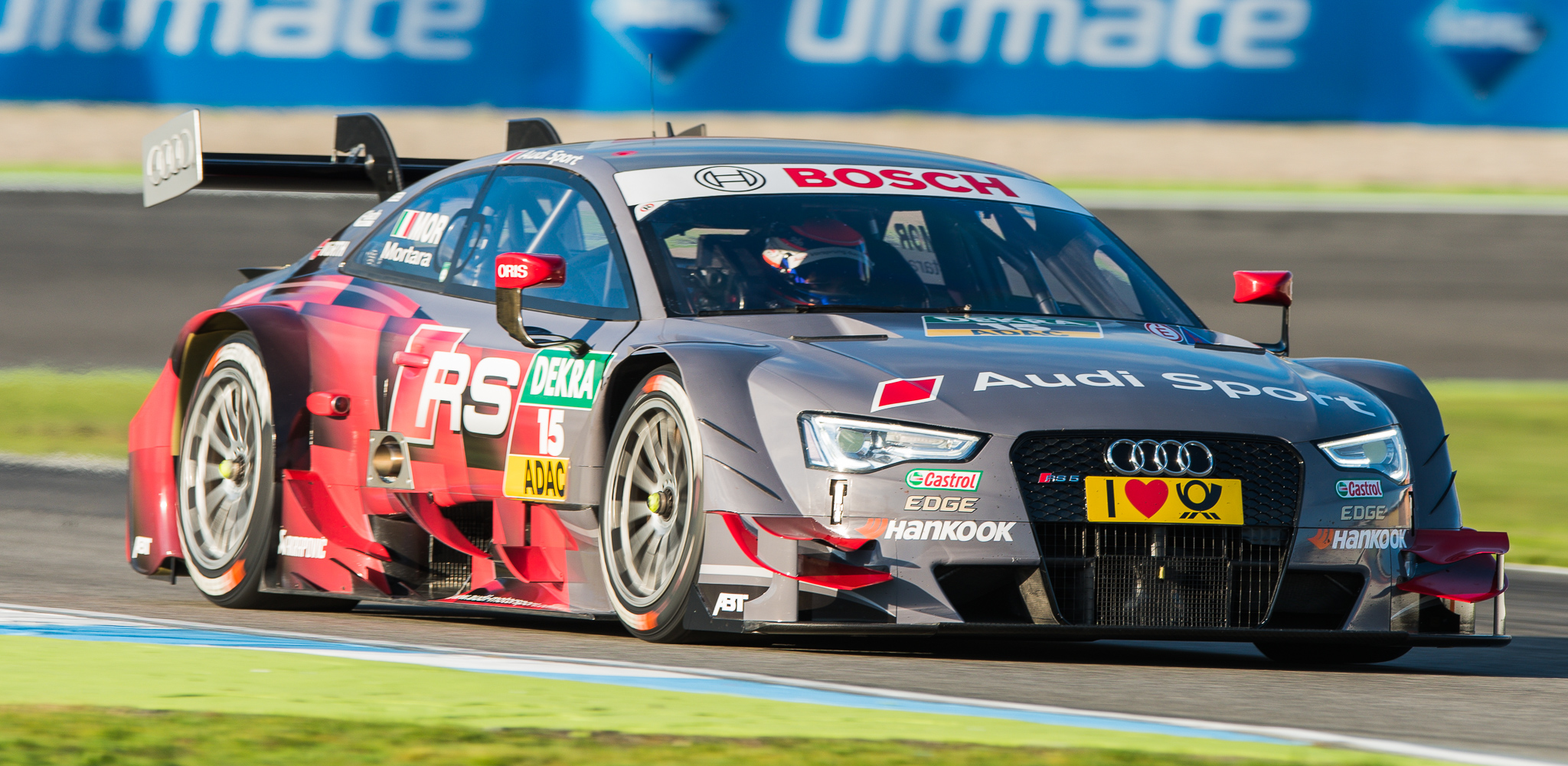
Mortara in DTM in 2014

Mortara's 2015 season started with a fourth and second place at the Hockenheimring. He then took second again at race 1 at the Lausitzring before finishing fifth in race 2. Two scoreless races at the Norisring followed; meanwhile at Zandvoort, Mortara retired from both races, with a collision in race 2 drawing the ire of Daniel Juncadella. Mortara qualified on pole for race 1 at the Red Bull Ring, which he went on to win despite losing the lead at the start. He finished third in race 2 and moved up to second in the standings. Two points finishes in Moscow kept his title bid going, but a pair of retirements at Oschersleben set Mortara back. Mortara scored a second place in race 1 at the Nürburgring after fighting off Pascal Wehrlein, but retired from race 2 after a collision with Timo Glock. He again retired due to contact in race 1 at Hockenheim, before going from 13th on the grid to second in race 2. With six podiums, Mortara finished fourth in the standings.

In 2016, Mortara returned for his third season with Team Abt. He started the year by winning the opening race at Hockenheim, overcoming an illness that affected him during the weekend. Mortara scored another podium with third at Spielberg, before finishing eighth in race 1 at the Lausitzring. At the Norisring, Mortara held off Jamie Green in the closing laps and claimed his second victory of the season, one that lifted him to the top of the standings. His next podium came in race 2 at Zandvoort, where Mortara benefited from punctures for two Mercedes ahead of him to finish third. Three finishes inside the top ten later, Mortara won race 2 at the Nürburgring by passing leader Lucas Auer during the second stint. He then took pole for race 1 at the Hungaroring and cruised to a dominant victory. In race 2, a collision between Mortara and title rival Marco Wittmann resulted in a non-score, meaning that Mortara entered the season finale with a 14-point gap to points leader Wittmann. Mortara started eighth for race 1 in Hockenheim and, thanks to several overtakes in the second stint, finished third, one place behind Wittmann. He then won race 2, though a fourth place for Wittmann meant that Mortara would finish second overall.

At the end of 2016, it was announced that Mortara would leave Audi to become a factory driver for Mercedes.

=== Mercedes-Benz (2017–2018) ===
For his first DTM season at Mercedes in 2017, Mortara joined the HWA-run Mercedes-AMG Motorsport BWT team. He finished 14th in the championship, scoring a lone podium with third at the Norisring.

Mortara remained at the HWA-run team in 2018. At the second round, held on the Lausitzring, Mortara took his first DTM victory for Mercedes in race 1. His next win came in race 1 at the Norisring, where Mortara qualified on pole and controlled the race. He finished second in race 2 of the weekend. Mortara then had two weekends where he failed to score a podium, before finishing third and second in Misano. With just two more points from the final three events, Mortara finished sixth in the standings.

During his DTM career, Mortara won ten races, scored 26 podiums, five poles, and six fastest laps.

== Sportscar career ==
=== Macau GT dominance (2011–2013) ===
In 2011, Mortara drove a Volkswagen Golf24 at the 24 Hours of Nürburgring, but retired from the race. At the end of the year, he took part in the Macau GT Cup in an Audi R8 LMS GT3. He ended up winning in controlling fashion, continuing the success from his Formula Three days. Mortara returned to the Macau GT Cup in 2012 and won again, having impressively passed Lucas di Grassi on lap 4 of the main race. In 2013, Mortara passed Alexandre Imperatori on the penultimate lap to claim another win on the Guia Circuit.

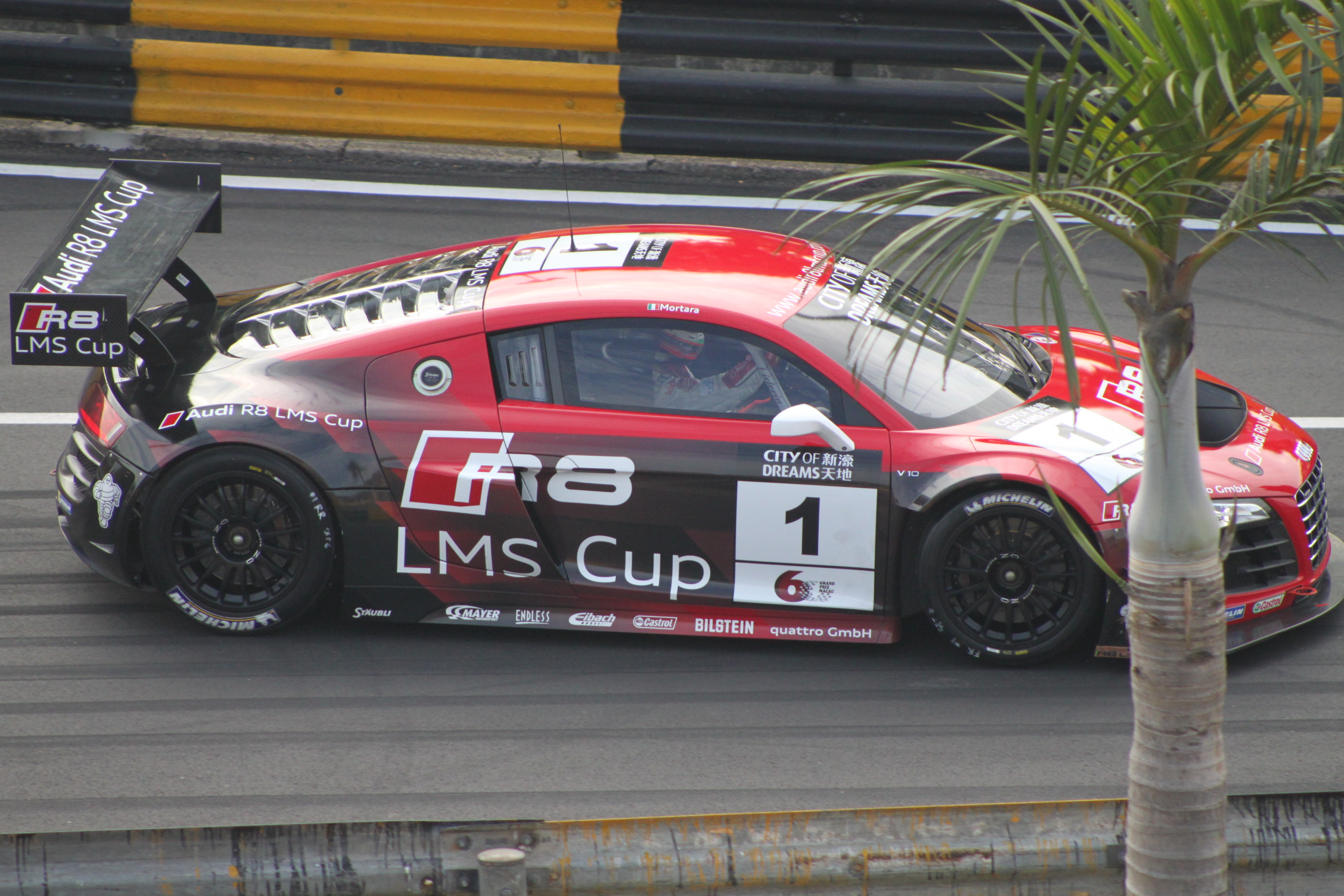
Mortara during the 2013 Macau GT race.

=== Macau podiums and fourth GT victory (2014–2017) ===
At the 2014 edition of the Macau GT race, Mortara claimed pole position in qualifying. However, a bad start caused Mortara to be overtaken by Maro Engel and Renger van der Zande, leaving him third at the checkered flag. In 2015, the race was rebranded as the FIA GT World Cup, with Mortara contesting the event as part of Audi Sport Team Phoenix. He qualified second but was overtaken by Engel in the qualifying race, though he would be classified second following a penalty for Stefan Mücke. In the main race, Mortara finished second on the road, but was demoted to sixth because of a penalty given for a jump start. At the 2016 GT World Cup, Mortara drove for Team WRT. He set the track record in a GT3 car during qualifying on his way to pole position. In the qualification race though, a bad start allowed teammate Laurens Vanthoor to jump ahead at the start, just before Mortara crashed into a wall. Mortara pitted to repair his car but was able to catch up to the pack thanks to a safety car, and ended up finishing 13th. He remained 13th in the shortened main race.

During the 2017 season, Mortara raced in the Blancpain GT Series Endurance Cup for AKKA ASP. Partnering Raffaele Marciello and Michael Meadows, Mortara qualified on pole for the 24 Hours of Spa alongside them and finished the race in third. With another podium at Silverstone, the trio ended the campaign fifth in the drivers' standings. He also drove for Mercedes-AMG Team HTP Motorsport at the 24 Hours of Nürburgring, but retired. The 2017 FIA GT World Cup meanwhile saw Mortara's first attempt at the race behind the wheel of a Mercedes-AMG GT3. Mortara took pole again before winning a chaotic qualification race; he had lost the lead to Maro Engel at the start but, after a red flag, was able to restart from first place due to a battery failure on Engel's car. Despite lightly hitting the wall on lap 1 of the main race, Mortara went unchallenged on his way to a sixth Macau victory.

=== Final years with Mercedes and Audi (2018–2023) ===
In 2018, Mortara only contested one GT3 race, the 2018 FIA GT World Cup with Team GruppeM Racing. He qualified fourth, last of the three Mercedes entries, and remained fourth in the qualification race. Due to a crash for stablemate Marciello in the main race, Mortara was able to finish third overall. For the 2019 edition, Mortara joined Team Craft-Bamboo Racing. After qualifying sixth, Mortara retired in the qualification race following contact with the crashing Maro Engel. Mortara recovered to sixth in the final race.

After foreigners were barred from contesting the 2020 and 2021 races due to the effects of the COVID-19 pandemic, Mortara joined Audi Sport Asia Team Absolute for the 2022 Macau GT Cup. Mortara qualified on pole, but was forced to start the qualification race from the pit lane after jumping the start of the formation lap; he recovered to finish fourth. Mortara then climbed to second place in the main race.

In 2023, Mortara took part in several GT3 events. He firstly entered the 24 Hours of Nürburgring with Mercedes-AMG Team Bilstein by HRT, but though the team finished third, Mortara was not awarded the result as he was withdrawn by the team midway through the race. (Note: Mortara was an entered driver in the No. 4 Mercedes-AMG Team Bilstein car, but was withdrawn during the race having driven 8 laps early on. He was not credited with the third-place finish.) He then joined Absolute Racing for the final round of the GT World Challenge Asia, where he finished fifth and seventh alongside Bao Jinlong at Sepang. To cap off the year, Mortara drove for Audi Sport Asia Team Absolute in Macau. He qualified second before being relegated to third by Engel in the qualification race. A failure on Engel's car allowed Mortara to finish second in the main race.

=== Lamborghini Hypercar project (2024–2025) ===
Ahead of the 2024 season, Mortara joined Lamborghini to become part of the brand's LMDh roster. Alongside Mirko Bortolotti and Daniil Kvyat, Mortara was chosen to pilot the new SC63 in the FIA World Endurance Championship. The team failed to score points until round four, the 24 Hours of Le Mans, where Mortara and his teammates finished tenth overall. This would be the team's only points finish, as the lineup finished last of all full-time entries in the championship. Mortara also drove in one round of the GT World Challenge Europe Endurance Cup with Iron Lynx, finishing 18th at Monza. At season's end, Mortara drove for SJM Theodore Vincenzo Sospiri Racing in the FIA GT World Cup, where he qualified 11th and finished tenth in the qualification race. A clean Sunday allowed Mortara to finish seventh overall.

Going into 2025, Lamborghini moved its SC63 programme fully to the IMSA SportsCar Championship, where Mortara drove in three events. He and Romain Grosjean finished tenth in Indianapolis, having been on course for a potential top five finish before a collision with the No. 7 Porsche forced them into an unscheduled pit stop. He, Grosjean, and Kvyat finished fourth at the season-ending Petit Le Mans. During 2025, Mortara drove in fourth rounds of GT World Challenge Asia in a Pro-Am-classed Absolute Corse entry, He partnered with Andrea Anatra and Vincenzo Ricci at Okayama his best result was fifth at the Mandalika Street Circuit. To end the year, Mortara once again drove at Macau, piloting a Lamborghini Huracán GT3 Evo 2 for Absolute Racing. Mortara started tenth for the qualification race, where a multi-car mixup caused him to drop to 15th. He crashed out of the race after "an apparent failure".

== Formula E ==
=== Venturi Racing (2017–2022) ===
==== 2017–18 season ====
In October 2017, it was announced that Mortara would join the Venturi Racing team for the 2017–18 Formula E season. Despite starting from 19th for his first race in Hong Kong, Mortara climbed up to seventh in race 1. On Sunday, Mortara qualified for super pole, where he qualified second. Mortara took the lead of race 2 after an early half-spin by Felix Rosenqvist and controlled the race until lap 43, when difficulties with his car's regenerative braking system caused him to spin and drop to third. He was promoted to second after original race winner Daniel Abt had been disqualified. Mortara later rued his mistake, which had happened through his desire to set the fastest lap alongside the race win. He qualified 18th in Marrakesh after persistent electrical issues throughout the weekend, before a contact-strewn race ended when Mortara and teammate Maro Engel collided. A 17th place in qualifying for the Santiago ePrix resulted in a 13th-placed finish, with Mortara having a half-spin during the race. Mortara then qualified 20th and last in Mexico City, but recovered to finish eighth. Mortara damaged his car on lap 9 of the Punta del Este ePrix, necessitating an early switch to the second car and a subsequently conservative drive, which ended in 17th place. After placing 17th in qualifying in Rome following contact with a wall, Mortara finished tenth in the race despite suffering contact from José María López. Mortara suffered another crash caused by López in Paris, where he ended up 13th. After missing the Berlin ePrix due his DTM commitments, Mortara retired from the Zurich ePrix due to a suspension failure. He missed the season finale in New York City and finished 13th in the drivers' standings.

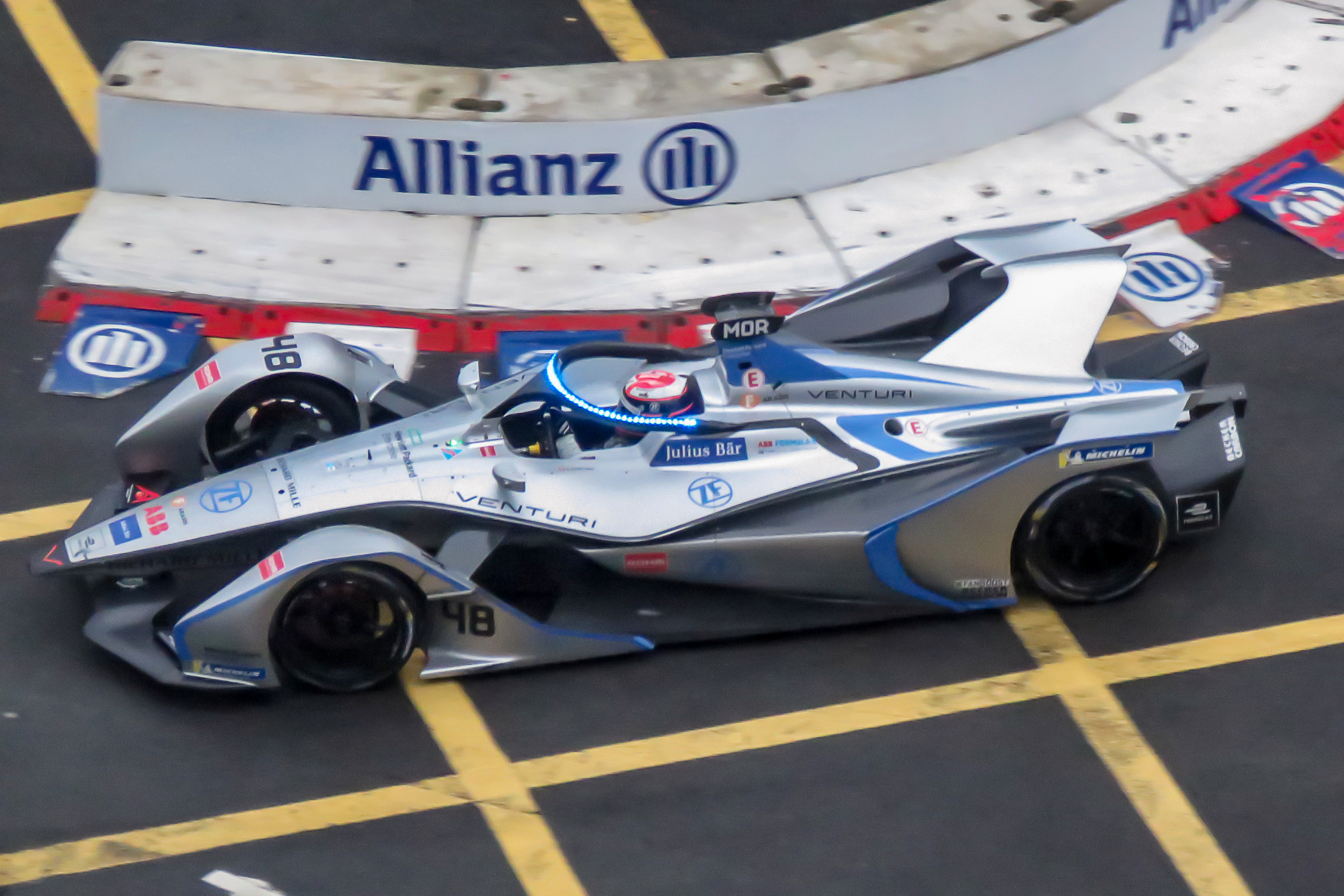
Mortara claimed his first FE victory for himself and Venturi team in Hong Kong.

==== 2018–19 season ====
Mortara returned to the Venturi team for the 2018–19 campaign, the first year for the new Spark SRT05e chassis. Despite crashing out of free practice for the Ad Diriyah ePrix with a brake failure, Mortara qualified 10th; he locked up and hit the barrier at turn 1 on the opening lap and finished 19th, one lap down. A 13th place in Marrakesh was followed by fourth in Santiago, where Mortara survived an early collision caused by Alexander Sims. In Mexico City, a post-race penalty for Pascal Wehrlein promoted Mortara to third. He then achieved redemption at Hong Kong: having qualified third but started sixth due to a red flag speeding penalty, Mortara profited from a late collision between Sam Bird and André Lotterer to finish second. As race winner Bird was penalised, Mortara was instead awarded the victory, his first in Formula E.

From here, Mortara would not score another point for the rest of the season. He received a drive-through penalty at Sanya for not activating attack mode the mandatory two times, which demoted him from tenth to 13th. Mortara retired at Rome with a driveshaft failure and crashed out of the Parix ePrix following a collision with Alex Lynn, in a move he himself described as "a bit optimistic". A three-place grid penalty carried over to the Monaco ePrix, where Mortara was forced to retire after colliding with Jérôme d'Ambrosio. After finishing 11th in Berlin, Mortara collided with Sims in Bern and retired; he received a five-place grid drop. At the season finale in New York City, Mortara retired from both races. He ended the season 14th in the standings.

==== 2019–20 season ====
Mortara began the 2019–20 season by finishing seventh in race 1 at Diriyah. He then narrowly missed out on the podium in race 2, finishing fourth. Having been held up in qualifying by a spinning Robin Frijns in Santiago, Mortara started from seventh, before hitting teammate Felipe Massa in the race and retiring later with collision damage following contact with António Félix da Costa. Mortara finished eighth in Mexico City and scored a fifth place in Marrakesh.

Due to the effects of the COVID-19 pandemic, the Formula E season ended with six races in Berlin. At the first race, Mortara received a drive-through penalty for causing a collision, dropping him to 17th place. He then finished eighth in race 2. Two 14th places in races 3 and 4 were followed by an eighth place in race 5. During race 6, Mortara dropped from his starting spot of sixth to finish tenth. Mortara ended up 14th in the championship, comprehensively outscoring teammate Massa.

==== 2020–21 season ====
Going into the 2020–21 season, Mortara returned for a fourth season with Venturi. At race 1 in Diriyah, Mortara pulled off a brave double overtake on Mitch Evans and Pascal Wehrlein, before overtaking René Rast late in the race to finish second. During the free practice session for race 2 however, Mortara suffered a freak accident: his car lost brake pressure following a practice start, causing Mortara to crash into the wall at turn 18. It was later revealed by Mercedes, which provided powertrains to the Venturi team, that an incorrect software parameter meant the rear brake system did not activate as intended and the fail-safe did not kick in. Mortara was released from the hospital but opted not to partake in race 2.

In Rome, Mortara's car refused to power up in qualifying and he was forced to start race 1 at the back of the grid; after serving a drive-through penalty for breaking parc fermé, Mortara retired from the race, having broken his front wing by hitting a suddenly-slowing Sérgio Sette Câmara. In race 2, Mortara climbed from seventh to fourth place, notably pulling off an important save of his car in the closing laps. Mortara retired from race 1 at Valencia due to a collision caused by André Lotterer, finished ninth in race 2, and ended the Monaco ePrix in 12th after a collision on the final lap.

A starting spot of sixth in race 1 at Puebla allowed Mortara to climb to fourth on track, which became third after the finish following a disqualification for Pascal Wehrlein. In race 2, Mortara started third and climbed to first, before holding off Wehrlein to take the victory and the championship lead. His points advantage disappeared at the next round in New York City, where Mortara failed to score points in both races; an electrical glitch in qualifying forced him to start race 1 from the back of the grid, while a lap 1 collision with Jake Dennis compromised race 2. Mortara started from 16th in race 1 at London, but was able to finish ninth. After starting race 2 from 20th, Mortara missed out on the points by finishing 11th, having stalled at the start due to a technical issue.

Going into the Berlin ePrix, Mortara was able to qualify fourth for race 1. He fought near the front throughout the race, eventually losing out on the victory to Lucas di Grassi by just over a tenth of a second. This allowed Mortara to climb to second in the standings, three points behind leader Nyck de Vries, entering race 2. Mortara qualified 11th, but this proved immaterial as he hit Mitch Evans, who had stalled on the grid, at the race start. Mortara suffered a fractured vertebra as a result of the collision, which was registered at 26 g. Nonetheless, Mortara finished the tightly congested championship fight in second overall.

==== 2021–22 season ====
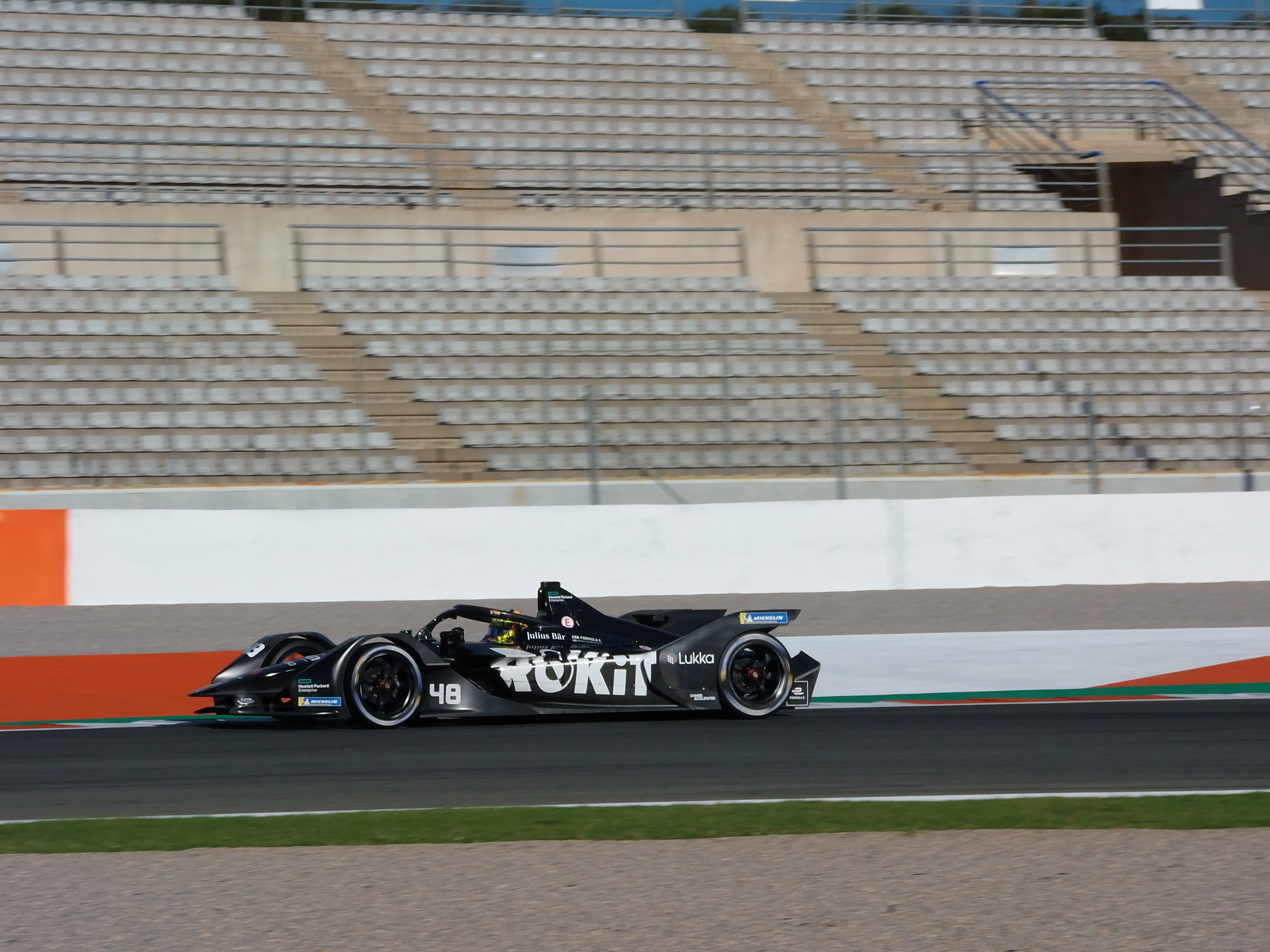
Mortara during testing for the 2021–22 Formula E World Championship. He finished the season third.

The 2021–22 season ended up being the last for the Gen2 package, with Mortara remaining at Venturi. He crashed in qualifying for race 1 at Diriyah but recovered to finish sixth. Race 2 saw Mortara pass both polesitter de Vries and his new teammate Lucas di Grassi to take his third Formula E victory, which allowed him to move into the championship lead. He qualified second in Mexico City but fell to fifth in the race's second half, then finished seventh in race 1 at Rome despite receiving a penalty for causing a collision with Oliver Rowland. In race 2, Mortara was hit by Félix da Costa, then retired with a suspected driveshaft failure after clipping a wall. From a 16th place on the grid in Monaco, Mortara recovered to fight teammate di Grassi for seventh place, before receiving a puncture from a contact with di Grassi. Following the race, Mortara dubbed di Grassi "the butcher of Formula E".

Mortara claimed his maiden Formula E pole position for race 1 in Berlin, beating Alexander Sims in the final. A composed race drive allowed him to claim victory. He qualified first again for Sunday's race, but was beaten at the start by de Vries and ended up finishing second. In Jakarta, Mortara qualified fourth before finishing third. At the Marrakesh ePrix, Mortara battled past Félix da Costa after the first attack mode activation and fought off the two DS Techeetah cars to take victory, as well as the championship lead. Mortara was originally classified fifth at the red-flagged race 1 of the New York City ePrix, where he and three other cars aquaplained off the track due to a torrential downpour, but was demoted to ninth for speeding under full-course yellow conditions. He finished tenth in race 2, having failed to set a lap in qualifying due to a braking problem.

The two London races set Mortara back in the championship. In race 1, an early collision with Sam Bird forced Mortara to pit for repairs; race 2 saw Mortara receiving a penalty for causing a collision, in addition to spinning off during an overtaking attempt. His title chase ended in race 1 at the season-ending Seoul round, where Mortara retired on lap 20 with a puncture. Mortara capped off his season strongly by winning race 2, which allowed him to finish third in the standings.

=== Maserati MSG Racing (2023) ===
==== 2022–23 season ====
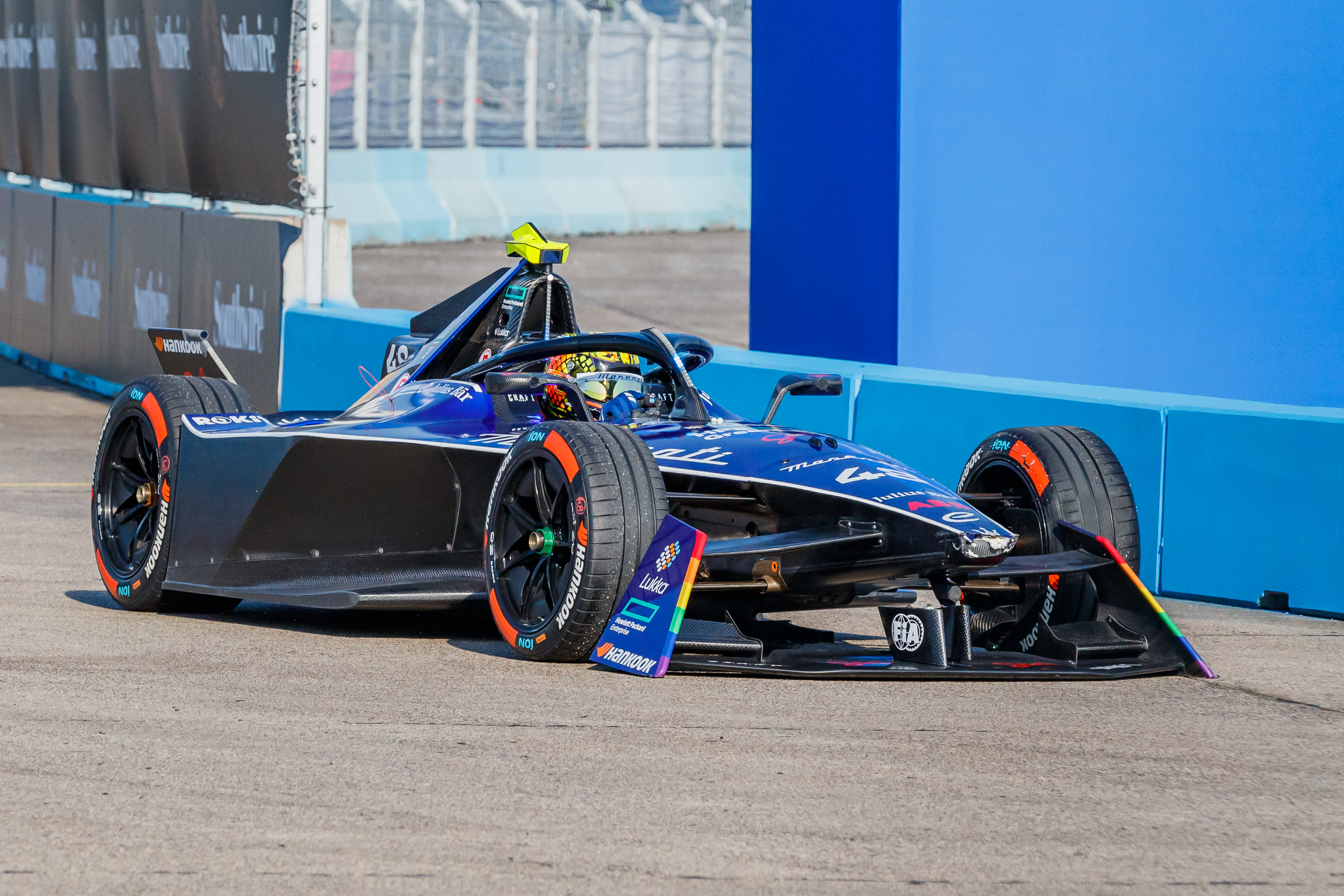
Mortara at the 2023 Berlin ePrix

Mortara remained at Venturi, which was rebranded as Maserati MSG Racing, for the 2022–23 season, the first using the new Gen3 chassis. Mortara experienced a difficult season containing multiple incidents and accidents. He crashed out of the Mexico City ePrix midway through the race, then retired from race 1 in Diriyah with a puncture. In race 2, Mortara scored his first points of the year with a ninth place. At Hyderabad, Mortara broke his front wing on lap 2 after hitting Nick Cassidy, but recovered to finish tenth. Despite showing strong pace in practice for the Cape Town ePrix, Mortara crashed out of qualifying and retired from the race early on with a mechanical failure. At São Paulo, Mortara qualified fourth but hit Mitch Evans on lap 1; he caught up to the pack during a safety car period but later spun after making contact with Nico Müller. He finished the first Berlin race ninth but retired on Sunday with a suspension issue.

At the Monaco ePrix, Mortara battled for the points positions before being hit by teammate Maximilian Günther. Mortara scored points in both races at Jakarta, though a missed attack mode activation in race 2 caused him to fall to eighth. He then ran sixth at Portland but was forced to retire after again suffering contact from Günther. In race 1 at Rome, Mortara was involved in a multi-car pileup triggered by Sam Bird, who lost control of his car out of the fast turn 6. Mortara, unsighted, hit Bird's stricken car and retired, although neither driver were injured in the accident. In race 2, Mortara climbed from ninth to fourth, earning him his best result of the season. Despite being hit by Stoffel Vandoorne in race 1 of the London ePrix, Mortara recovered to finish fifth. He finished 11th in race 2, leaving him 14th in the championship standings.

After spending six years with the team, Mortara left Maserati at the end of the season.

=== Mahindra Racing (2024–) ===
==== 2023–24 season ====
Mortara joined Mahindra Racing ahead of the 2023–24 season, having signed a multi-year contract. His maiden year with the team provided mixed impressions. After starting the campaign with four point-less finishes, Mortara fought for the lead with Oliver Rowland at Tokyo, going on to finish sixth on the road before being disqualified for energy overuse. He also failed to score from the next three races, which included an accident at Monaco caused by a technical failure. Mortara scored his and the team's first points of the season in qualifying for the first Berlin race, beating Stoffel Vandoorne in the duels final to claim pole position. In a peloton-style race, Mortara slipped down to eighth. He then went another three races without scoring, but achieved his best result of the year with a fourth place in Portland's race 1. In race 2, Mortara suffered a puncture after making contact with Félix da Costa. Mortara finished fifth in race 1 at London, earning himself enough points to place 16th in the drivers' championship. Mortara ended up as the full-time driver with the lowest number of completed race laps during the season.

==== 2024–25 season ====
The 2024–25 season started much more positively for Mortara, who finished fifth in São Paulo. After a non-score in Mexico City, Mortara went on a run of four successive points finishes, claiming seventh and tenth at Jeddah, fifth in Miami after fighting for the podium in a red-flagged event, and fourth in race 1 at Monaco. In race 2, he finished 12th. Mortara fought for the podium in the opening embers of the first Tokyo race, but slid down to sixth after the mandatory pit stop. He then received a penalty for causing a collision with Taylor Barnard in race 2, demoting him from fifth to 12th. At Shanghai, Mortara ended race 1 due to a collision with Nick Cassidy and placed 19th in race 2.

Mortara ended his podium drought at the Jakarta ePrix, where he profited from misfortune for the leading pair of de Vries and Jake Dennis to climb up to second, chasing eventual winner Dan Ticktum until the checkered flag. Thanks to a penalty for Félix da Costa, Mortara also finished on the rostrum in race 1 at Berlin, taking third after starting from 11th. More points followed with sixth place in race 1 at London despite an early collision caused by Maximilian Günther, but an early car-related issue ended race 2 prematurely. Mortara finished eighth in the championship, helping Mahindra to climb to fourth in the teams' standings.

==== 2025–26 season ====
In 2025–26, Mortara remained at Mahindra for the final season of the Gen3 era.

==== 2026–27 season ====
Mortara continued at Mahindra for a fourth campaign during the 2026–27 season heading into the Gen4 era.

== Racing record ==
=== Career summary ===
Season	Series	Team	Races	Wins	Poles	F/Laps	Podiums	Points	Position
2006	Eurocup Formula Renault 2.0	Prema Powerteam	14	0	0	0	0	8	22nd
2006	Formula Renault 2.0 Italia	Prema Powerteam	15	0	0	1	3	144	4th
2007	Formula 3 Euro Series	Signature-Plus	20	2	0	1	4	37	8th
2007	Macau Grand Prix	Signature-Plus	1	0	0	0	0	N/A	10th
2008	Formula 3 Euro Series	Signature-Plus	20	1	0	0	6	49.5	**2nd**
2008	Macau Grand Prix	Signature-Plus	1	0	1	0	1	N/A	**2nd**
2008–09	GP2 Asia Series	Trust Team Arden	8	0	0	0	1	11	11th
2009	GP2 Series	Telmex Arden International	20	1	0	2	1	19	14th
2009	Formula Renault 3.5 Series	Tech 1 Racing	2	0	0	0	0	6	24th
2009	Formula Renault 3.5 Series	KMP Group/SG Formula	2	0	0	0	0	6	24th
2009	Formula 3 Euro Series	Kolles & Heinz Union	2	0	0	0	0	0	NC†
2009	Macau Grand Prix	Signature	1	1	0	1	1	N/A	**1st**
2010	Formula 3 Euro Series	Signature	18	7	5	6	11	101	**1st**
2010	Macau Grand Prix	Signature	1	1	1	1	1	N/A	**1st**
2011	Deutsche Tourenwagen Masters	Team Rosberg	10	0	0	0	2	21	9th
2011	Macau GT Cup	Audi R8 LMS	1	1	1	1	1	N/A	**1st**
2011	24 Hours of Nürburgring - SP8T	Volkswagen Motorsport	1	0	0	0	0	N/A	DNF
2012	Deutsche Tourenwagen Masters	Team Rosberg	10	2	1	0	3	82	5th
2012	Macau GT Cup	Audi R8 LMS	1	1	1	1	1	N/A	**1st**
2013	Deutsche Tourenwagen Masters	Audi Sport Team Abt Sportsline	10	0	0	0	0	3	21st
2013	Audi R8 LMS Cup China	Brothers Racing Team	1	1	1	0	1	N/A	**1st**
2013	Macau GT Cup	Brothers Racing Team	1	1	0	1	1	N/A	**1st**
2014	Deutsche Tourenwagen Masters	Audi Sport Team Abt Sportsline	10	0	0	0	2	68	5th
2014	Macau GT Cup	Audi Race Experience	1	0	1	0	1	N/A	**3rd**
2015	Deutsche Tourenwagen Masters	Audi Sport Team Abt Sportsline	18	1	1	2	6	143	4th
2015	FIA GT World Cup	Audi Sport Team Phoenix	2	0	0	0	1	N/A	6th
2016	Deutsche Tourenwagen Masters	Audi Sport Team Abt Sportsline	18	5	2	3	8	202	**2nd**
2016	FIA GT World Cup	Audi Sport Team WRT	2	0	1	0	0	N/A	13th
2016	24 Hours of Nürburgring - SP9	Phoenix Racing	1	0	0	0	0	N/A	DNF
2017	Deutsche Tourenwagen Masters	Mercedes-AMG Motorsport BWT	18	0	0	0	1	61	14th
2017	Blancpain GT Series Endurance Cup	AKKA ASP	5	0	0	0	2	43	5th
2017	Intercontinental GT Challenge	AKKA ASP	1	0	0	0	1	15	9th
2017	FIA GT World Cup	Mercedes-AMG Team Driving Academy	2	2	1	0	2	N/A	**1st**
2017	24 Hours of Nürburgring - SP9	Mercedes-AMG Team HTP Motorsport	1	0	0	0	0	N/A	DNF
2017–18	Formula E	Venturi Formula E Team	9	0	0	0	1	29	13th
2018	Deutsche Tourenwagen Masters	SILBERPFEIL Energy Mercedes-AMG Motorsport	20	2	1	0	5	140	6th
2018	FIA GT World Cup	Mercedes-AMG Team Driving Academy	2	0	0	1	1	N/A	**3rd**
2018–19	Formula E	Venturi Formula E Team	13	1	0	0	2	52	14th
2019	FIA GT World Cup	Mercedes-AMG Team Craft Bamboo Racing	2	0	0	0	0	N/A	6th
2019–20	Formula E	ROKiT Venturi Racing	11	0	0	0	0	41	14th
2020–21	Formula E	ROKiT Venturi Racing	14	1	0	0	4	92	**2nd**
2021–22	Formula E	ROKiT Venturi Racing	16	4	2	2	6	169	**3rd**
2022	Macau GT Cup	Audi Sport Asia Team Absolute	2	0	1	2	1	N/A	**2nd**
2022–23	Formula E	Maserati MSG Racing	16	0	0	0	0	39	14th
2023	GT World Challenge Asia - GT3	Absolute Racing	2	0	0	0	0	16	26th
2023	24 Hours of Nürburgring - SP9	Mercedes-AMG Team Bilstein by HRT	1	0	1	0	0	N/A	NC (Note: Mortara was an entered driver in the No. 4 Mercedes-AMG Team Bilstein car, but was withdrawn during the race having driven 8 laps early on. He was not credited with the third-place finish.)
2023	FIA GT World Cup	Audi Sport Asia Team Absolute	2	0	0	0	1	N/A	**2nd**
2023	Thailand Super Series - GT3	Absolute B-Quik Racing	2	0	1	0	0	N/A	NC†
2023–24	Formula E	Mahindra Racing	16	0	1	0	0	29	16th
2024	FIA World Endurance Championship - Hypercar	Lamborghini Iron Lynx	7	0	0	0	0	2	32nd
2024	GT World Challenge Europe Endurance Cup	Iron Lynx	1	0	0	0	0	0	NC
2024	FIA GT World Cup	SJM Theodore Vincenzo Sospiri Racing	2	0	0	0	0	N/A	7th
2024–25	Formula E	Mahindra Racing	16	0	0	0	3	92	8th
2025	IMSA SportsCar Championship - GTP	Automobili Lamborghini Squadra Corse	3	0	0	0	0	749	25th
2025	GT World Challenge Asia	Absolute Corse	3	0	0	0	0	10	35th
2025	GT World Challenge Asia - Pro-Am Cup	Absolute Corse	3	0	0	0	1	25	25th
2025	FIA GT World Cup	Absolute Racing	1	0	0	0	0	N/A	DNF
2025–26	Formula E	Mahindra Racing	17	0	4	0	3	137	5th
2026–27	Formula E	Mahindra Racing	0	0	0	0	0	0	TBD

^{†} As Mortara was a guest driver, he was ineligible to score points. ^{*} Season still in progress.

=== Complete Formula Renault 2.0 Italia results ===
(key) (Races in bold indicate pole position) (Races in italics indicate fastest lap)

Year	Team	1	2	3	4	5	6	7	8	9	10	11	12	13	14	15	Pos	Points
2006	Prema Powerteam	MUG; 1; 2	MUG; 2; 3	VLL; 1; 4	VLL; 2; 20	IMO; 1 Ret	IMO; 2; 6	SPA; 1; 3	SPA; 2; 7	HOC; 1; 5	HOC; 2; 14	MIS; 1; 9	MIS; 2; 7	VAR; 7	MNZ; 1; 16	MNZ; 2; 5	4th	144

=== Complete Eurocup Formula Renault 2.0 results ===
(key) (Races in bold indicate pole position) (Races in italics indicate fastest lap)

Year	Team	1	2	3	4	5	6	7	8	9	10	11	12	13	14	Pos	Points
2006	Prema Powerteam	ZOL; 1; 15	ZOL; 2 Ret	IST; 1 Ret	IST; 2; 20	MIS; 1; 26	MIS; 2; 12	NÜR; 1; 17	NÜR; 2; 20	DON; 1 Ret	DON; 2; 9	LMS; 1 Ret	LMS; 2; 7	CAT; 1 Ret	CAT; 2; 27	22nd	8

=== Complete Formula 3 Euro Series results ===
(key) (Races in bold indicate pole position) (Races in italics indicate fastest lap)

Year	Entrant	Chassis	Engine	1	2	3	4	5	6	7	8	9	10	11	12	13	14	15	16	17	18	19	20	DC	Points
2007	Signature-Plus	Dallara 305/035	Mercedes	HOC; 1; 6	HOC; 2; 8	BRH; 1; 8	BRH; 2; 1	NOR; 1; 3	NOR; 2 Ret	MAG; 1; 16	MAG; 2; 12	MUG; 1; 9	MUG; 2; 18	ZAN; 1; 14	ZAN; 2; 9	NÜR; 1; 22	NÜR; 2; 11	CAT; 1; 1	CAT; 2 Ret	NOG; 1; 6	NOG; 2; 8	HOC; 1; 6	HOC; 2; 2	8th	37
2008	Signature-Plus	Dallara F308/073	Volkswagen	HOC; 1; 3	HOC; 2; 3	MUG; 1; 4	MUG; 2; 3	PAU; 1; 2	PAU; 2; 1	NOR; 1; 4	NOR; 2; 3	ZAN; 1 Ret	ZAN; 2; 21	NÜR; 1 Ret	NÜR; 2; 23	BRH; 1; 4	BRH; 2; 4	CAT; 1; 9	CAT; 2 Ret	LMS; 1; 9	LMS; 2; 14	HOC; 1; 12	HOC; 2; 6	2nd	49.5
2009	Kolles & Heinz Union	Dallara F308/005	Volkswagen	HOC; 1	HOC; 2	LAU; 1	LAU; 2	NOR; 1	NOR; 2	ZAN; 1	ZAN; 2	OSC; 1	OSC; 2	NÜR; 1	NÜR; 2	BRH; 1	BRH; 2	CAT; 1	CAT; 2	DIJ; 1	DIJ; 2	HOC; 1 Ret	HOC; 2 Ret	NC	0
2010	Signature	Dallara F309/023	Volkswagen	LEC; 1; 1	LEC; 2; 2	HOC; 1; 2	HOC; 2; 3	**VAL**; **1**; 1	VAL; 2; 6	**NOR**; **1**; 1	NOR; 2; 3	**NÜR**; **1**; 1	NÜR; 2; 6	**ZAN**; **1**; 1	ZAN; 2; 11	BRH; 1; 1	BRH; 2 Ret	OSC; 1; 5	OSC; 2 Ret	**HOC**; **1**; 1	HOC; 2 DSQ			1st	101

=== Complete GP2 Series results ===
(key) (Races in bold indicate pole position) (Races in italics indicate fastest lap)

Year	Entrant	1	2	3	4	5	6	7	8	9	10	11	12	13	14	15	16	17	18	19	20	DC	Points
2009	Arden International	CAT; FEA; 6	CAT; SPR; 1	MON; FEA; Ret	MON; SPR; 13	IST; FEA; Ret	IST; SPR; 9	SIL; FEA; Ret	SIL; SPR; Ret	NÜR; FEA; 17	NÜR; SPR; Ret	HUN; FEA; 12	HUN; SPR; 14	VAL; FEA; 6	VAL; SPR; 12	SPA; FEA; 8	SPA; SPR; Ret	MNZ; FEA; 5	MNZ; SPR; Ret	ALG; FEA; Ret	ALG; SPR; 8	14th	19

==== Complete GP2 Asia Series results ====
(key) (Races in bold indicate pole position) (Races in italics indicate fastest lap)

Year	Entrant	1	2	3	4	5	6	7	8	9	10	11	12	DC	Points
2008–09	Trust Team Arden	SHI; FEA	SHI; SPR	ARE; FEA	ARE; SPR	BHR1; FEA; 3	BHR1; SPR; 8	LSL; FEA; 7	LSL; SPR; 4	SEP; FEA; Ret	SEP; SPR; 17	BHR2; FEA; Ret	BHR2; SPR; 16	11th	11

=== Complete Formula Renault 3.5 Series results ===
(key) (Races in bold indicate pole position) (Races in italics indicate fastest lap)

Year	Team	1	2	3	4	5	6	7	8	9	10	11	12	13	14	15	16	17	Pos	Points
2009	Tech 1 Racing	CAT; SPR	CAT; FEA	SPA; SPR	SPA; FEA	MON; FEA	HUN; SPR; 21	HUN; FEA; Ret	SIL; SPR	SIL; FEA									24th	6
2009	KMP Group/SG Formula										BUG; SPR; Ret	BUG; FEA; 6	ALG; SPR	ALG; FEA	NÜR; SPR	NÜR; FEA	ALC; SPR	ALC; FEA	24th	6

=== Complete Deutsche Tourenwagen Masters results ===
(key) (Races in bold indicate pole position) (Races in italics indicate fastest lap)

Year	Team	Car	1	2	3	4	5	6	7	8	9	10	11	12	13	14	15	16	17	18	19	20	Pos	Points
2011	Team Rosberg	Audi A4 DTM 2008	HOC; 14	ZAN; 6	SPL; 16	LAU; Ret	NOR; 5	NÜR; 7	BRH; 3	OSC; 3	VAL; 16	HOC; 13											9th	21
2012	Team Rosberg	Audi A5 DTM	HOC; 11	LAU; 8	BRH; 9	**SPL**; 1	NOR; Ret	NÜR; 2	ZAN; 1	OSC; Ret	VAL; 16†	HOC; 6											5th	82
2013	Team Rosberg	Audi RS5 DTM	HOC; Ret	BRH; 21†	SPL; 15	LAU; 9	NOR; 17†	MSC; Ret	NÜR; 12	OSC; 10	ZAN; 14	HOC; 15											21st	3
2014	Audi Sport Team Abt Sportsline	Audi RS5 DTM	HOC; 22†	OSC; 3	HUN; 4	NOR; 4	MSC; 9	SPL; 16	NÜR; 3	LAU; 16	ZAN; 4	HOC; 22†											5th	68
2015	Audi Sport Team Abt Sportsline	Audi RS5 DTM	HOC; 1; 4	HOC; 2; 2	LAU; 1; 2	LAU; 2; 5	NOR; 1; 11	NOR; 2; 15	ZAN; 1 Ret	ZAN; 2 Ret	**SPL**; **1**; 1	SPL; 2; 3	MSC; 1; 6	MSC; 2; 8	OSC; 1; 19†	OSC; 2 Ret	NÜR; 1; 2	NÜR; 2 Ret	HOC; 1 Ret	HOC; 2; 3			4th	143
2016	Audi Sport Team Abt Sportsline	Audi RS5 DTM	HOC; 1; 1	HOC; 2; 11	SPL; 1; 3	SPL; 2 Ret	LAU; 1; 8	LAU; 2; 12	NOR; 1; 1	NOR; 2; 8	ZAN; 1; 17	ZAN; 2; 3	MSC; 1; 8	MSC; 2; 6	NÜR; 1; 4	NÜR; 2; 1	**HUN**; **1**; 1	**HUN**; **2**; 19†	HOC; 1; 3	HOC; 2; 1			2nd	202
2017	Mercedes-AMG Motorsport BWT	Mercedes-AMG C63 DTM	HOC; 1; 4	HOC; 2; 13	LAU; 1; 7	LAU; 2; 11	HUN; 1; 9	HUN; 2; 11	NOR; 1; 8	NOR; 2; 3	MSC; 1; 13	MSC; 2; 10	ZAN; 1; 12	ZAN; 2; 12	NÜR; 1; 7	NÜR; 2; 16	SPL; 1; 9	SPL; 2; 17	HOC; 1; 5	HOC; 2; 9			14th	61
2018	SILBERPFEIL Energy Mercedes-AMG Motorsport	Mercedes-AMG C63 DTM	HOC; 1; 4	HOC; 2 Ret	LAU; 1; 1	LAU; 2; 11	HUN; 1; 5	HUN; 2 DSQ	**NOR**; **1**; 1	NOR; 2; 2	ZAN; 1; 13	ZAN; 2; 8	BRH; 1; 8	BRH; 2; 17	MIS; 1; 3	MIS; 2; 2	NÜR; 1; 13	NÜR; 2; 11	SPL; 1; 16	SPL; 2; 10	HOC; 1; 10	HOC; 2; 13	6th	140

^{†} Driver did not finish, but was classified as he completed more than 90% of the race distance.

=== Complete Formula E results ===
(key) (Races in bold indicate pole position; races in italics indicate fastest lap)

Year	Team	Chassis	Powertrain	1	2	3	4	5	6	7	8	9	10	11	12	13	14	15	16	17	Pos	Points
2017–18	Venturi Formula E Team	Spark SRT01-e	Venturi VM200-FE-03	HKG; 7	HKG; 2	MRK; 17†	SCL; 13	MEX; 8	PDE; 17	RME; 10	PAR; 13	BER	ZUR; Ret	NYC	NYC						13th	29
2018–19	Venturi Formula E Team	Spark SRT05e	Venturi VFE05	ADR; 19	MRK; 13	SCL; 4	MEX; 3	HKG; 1	SYX; 13	RME; Ret	PAR; Ret	MCO; Ret	BER; 11	BRN; Ret	NYC; Ret	NYC; Ret					14th	52
2019–20	ROKiT Venturi Racing	Spark SRT05e	Mercedes-Benz EQ Silver Arrow 01	DIR; 7	DIR; 4	SCL; Ret	MEX; 8	MRK; 5	BER; 17	BER; 8	BER; 14	BER; 14	BER; 8	BER; 10							14th	41
2020–21	ROKiT Venturi Racing	Spark SRT05e	Mercedes-Benz EQ Silver Arrow 02	DIR; 2	DIR; DNS	RME; Ret	RME; 4	VLC; Ret	VLC; 9	MCO; 12	PUE; 3	PUE; 1	NYC; 14	NYC; 17	LDN; 9	LDN; 11	BER; 2	BER; Ret			2nd	92
2021–22	ROKiT Venturi Racing	Spark SRT05e	Mercedes-EQ Silver Arrow 02	DRH; 6	DRH; 1	MEX; 5	RME; 7	RME; Ret	MCO; Ret	**BER**; 1	**BER**; 2	JAK; 3	MRK; 1	NYC; 9	NYC; 10	LDN; 18	LDN; 13	SEO; Ret	SEO; 1		3rd	169
2022–23	Maserati MSG Racing	Formula E Gen3	Maserati Tipo Folgore	MEX; Ret	DRH; Ret	DRH; 9	HYD; 10	CAP; Ret	SAP; Ret	BER; 9	BER; Ret	MCO; 11	JAK; 6	JAK; 8	POR; Ret	RME; Ret	RME; 4	LDN; 5	LDN; 11		14th	39
2023–24	Mahindra Racing	Formula E Gen3	Mahindra M9Electro	MEX; 13	DRH; 15	DRH; 11	SAP; 12	TOK; DSQ	MIS; Ret	MIS; 13	MCO; Ret	**BER**; 8	BER; 16	SIC; Ret	SIC; 13	POR; 4	POR; Ret	LDN; 5	LDN; Ret		16th	29
2024–25	Mahindra Racing	Formula E Gen3 Evo	Mahindra M11Electro	SAO; 5	MEX; 19	JED; 7	JED; 10	MIA; 5	MCO; 4	MCO; 12	TKO; 6	TKO; 12	SHA; Ret	SHA; 19	JKT; 2	BER; 3	BER; 11	LDN; 6	LDN; Ret		9th	88
2025–26	Mahindra Racing	Formula E Gen3 Evo	Mahindra M12Electro	SAO; Ret	MEX; 2	MIA; 6	**JED**; 2	**JED**; 4	MAD; 5	**BER**; 4	BER; 7	MCO; 17	MCO; 5	SAN; Ret	SHA; 15	SHA; 16	TKO; 5	**TKO**; Ret	LDN; 7	LDN; 3	5th	137

^{†} Driver did not finish, but was classified as he completed more than 90% of the race distance. ^{*} Season still in progress.

=== Complete FIA World Endurance Championship results ===
(key) (Races in bold indicate pole position) (Races in italics indicate fastest lap)

Year	Entrant	Class	Car	Engine	1	2	3	4	5	6	7	8	Rank	Points
2024	Lamborghini Iron Lynx	Hypercar	Lamborghini SC63	Lamborghini 3.8 L Turbo V8	QAT; 13	IMO; 12	SPA	LMS; 10	SAP; 17	COA; 14	FUJ; Ret	BHR; Ret	32nd	2

=== Complete 24 Hours of Le Mans results ===
Year	Team	Co-Drivers	Car	Class	Laps	Pos.	Class Pos.
2024	(Italy) Lamborghini Iron Lynx	(Italy) Mirko Bortolotti; Daniil Kvyat	Lamborghini SC63	Hypercar	309	10th	10th

=== Complete IMSA SportsCar Championship results ===
(key) (Races in bold indicate pole position; races in italics indicate fastest lap)

Year	Team	Class	Make	Engine	1	2	3	4	5	6	7	8	9	Rank	Points
2025	Automobili Lamborghini Squadra Corse	GTP	Lamborghini SC63	Lamborghini 3.8 L Turbo V8	DAY; 12	SEB	LBH	LGA	DET	WGL	ELK	IMS; 10	PET; 4	25th	749

=== Complete GT World Challenge Asia results ===
Year	Team	Car	Class	1	2	3	4	5	6	7	8	9	10	11	12	DC	Points
2025	Absolute Corse	Lamborghini Huracán GT3 Evo 2	Pro-Am	SEP; 1	SEP; 2	MAN; 1; 8	MAN; 2; 3	CHA; 1	CHA; 2	FUJ; 1	FUJ; 2	OKA; 1; 7	OKA; 2 DNS	BEI; 1	BEI; 2	25th	25

== Notes ==
Sporting positions
Preceded by Keisuke Kunimoto	Macau Grand Prix; Winner; 2009–2010	Succeeded by Daniel Juncadella
Preceded by Jules Bianchi	Formula 3 Euro Series; Champion; 2010	Succeeded by Roberto Merhi
Preceded by Keita Sawa	Macau GT Cup; Winner; 2011-2013	Succeeded by Maro Engel (FIA GT World Cup)
Preceded by Laurens Vanthoor	FIA GT World Cup; Winner; 2017	Succeeded by Augusto Farfus
