= 2018 FIA GT World Cup =

Motor race

Race details
Date	18 November 2018
Official name	SJM Macau GT Cup – FIA GT World Cup
Location	Guia Circuit, Macau
Course	Temporary street circuit 6.120 km (3.803 mi)
Distance	Qualification Race; 12 laps, 73.440 km (45.634 mi); Main Race; 18 laps, 110.160 km (68.450 mi)
- Qualification Race

Pole
Driver	Raffaele Marciello (ITA)	Mercedes-AMG Team GruppeM Racing
Time	2:16.800

Fastest lap
Driver	Augusto Farfus (BRA)	BMW Team Schnitzer
Time	2:17.987 (on lap 9)

Podium
First	Augusto Farfus (BRA)	BMW Team Schnitzer
Second	Raffaele Marciello (ITA)	Mercedes-AMG Team GruppeM Racing
Third	Maro Engel (DEU)	Mercedes-AMG Team GruppeM Racing
- Main Race

Pole
Driver	Augusto Farfus (BRA)	BMW Team Schnitzer

Fastest lap
Driver	Edoardo Mortara (CHE)	Mercedes-AMG Team GruppeM Racing
Time	2:18.276 (on lap 10)

Podium
First	Augusto Farfus (BRA)	BMW Team Schnitzer
Second	Maro Engel (DEU)	Mercedes-AMG Team GruppeM Racing
Third	Edoardo Mortara (CHE)	Mercedes-AMG Team GruppeM Racing

The 2018 FIA GT World Cup (formally the SJM Macau GT Cup – FIA GT World Cup) was a Grand Touring (GT) sports car race held on the Guia Circuit in the Chinese Special Administrative Region of Macau on 18 November. It was the event's fourth annual edition and the eleventh GT3 car race in Macau. Only platinum and gold drivers were allowed to compete, but silver drivers were eligible on a case by case basis at the FIA GT World Cup Committee's discretion. The Stéphane Ratel Organisation, in collaboration with the Fédération Internationale de l'Automobile (FIA), promoted the race. The event was made up of two races: a 12-lap qualifying race to set the 18-lap main race's starting grid.

Augusto Farfus of BMW Team Schnitzer won the main race from pole position in a BMW M6 GT3. After winning the Qualification Race the afternoon before, Farfus led every lap of the main race to achieve his fourth Macau victory and his first since the 2009 Guia Race of Macau. BMW became the third manufacturer to win the race. Mercedes-AMG Team GruppeM Racing's Maro Engel finished second, and his teammate Edoardo Mortara finished third.

== Background and entry list ==
The 2018 FIA GT World Cup was confirmed at the FIA World Motor Sport Council meeting on March 9. The event was held in the Chinese Special Administrative Region of Macau thanks to a contract extension with race organisers. It was the race's fourth staging and the eleventh GT3 event in Macau, taking place on the 6.120 km (3.803 mi) Guia Circuit in the streets of Macau on November 18, 2018, after three days of practice and qualifying. The Stéphane Ratel Organisation (SRO) collaborated with the Fédération Internationale de l'Automobile (FIA) to promote the race; the SRO was appointed by the promoter Associação Geral Automóvel de Macau-China to form a field of cars. The manufacturers' championship was presented to the maker of the winning participant's car, in accordance with the event regulations. The FIA nominated tyre manufacturer Pirelli as the race's control tyre supplier for the fourth successive year.

Drivers had to have competed in an FIA-regulated championship race based on GT3 regulations in the previous two seasons or have significant experience in Grand Touring (GT) cars to enter the race. Only those with a platinum or gold racing licences could automatically enter. Silver-ranked drivers were also permitted, but they had to be approved individually by the FIA GT World Cup Committee. Bronze-rated competitors were not permitted to compete. Entries were open from 6 July to 31 August. The FIA released the entry list on 18 October. The entry list included 15 drivers from 11 different countries, (Note: Lamborghini was not present because its main Asian-based team was preparing to relocate to Europe, and Honda was not present because they did not prioritise the GT3 category. Aston Martin and McLaren were preparing to launch new GT3 cars, while Bentley was delivering new Continental GT3s to teams.) and they came from series such as the ADAC GT Masters and the Blancpain GT Series. Maro Engel, Laurens Vanthoor and Edoardo Mortara, as well as 2007 Macau Grand Prix winner Oliver Jarvis, were all former FIA GT World Cup winners.

The FIA imposed a balance of performance to ensure a high level of parity. The Audi R8 LMS had 10 kg (22 lb) of ballast added. Meanwhile, the weight of the BMW M6 GT3 was decreased by 10 kg (22 lb) but the turbocharger boost was reduced. The Mercedes-AMG GT3 gained handling with a 20 kg (44 lb) reduction in ballast but lost performance due to a 1 mm (0.039 in) reduction in air restrictor size. The Nissan GT-R Nismo GT3 debuted in Macau, weighing 1,305 kg (2,877 lb), while the Porsche 911 GT3 R received no performance changes.

== Practice ==
There were two half-an-hour practice sessions preceding the 18 November race. Robin Frijns's No. 66 Team WRT Speedstar Audi R8 LMS lapped fastest in the first practice session on the afternoon of 15 November at 2:18.588, ahead of Mortara, Christopher Haase, Augusto Farfus and Earl Bamber. Four manufacturers were represented in the first five. The session was stopped for separate accidents at the Melco hairpin. Dries Vanthoor, Frijns' teammate, hit the outside wall and lost control, coming to a stop sideways across the circuit. His car's front-left bodywork was damaged, and the spoiler was removed. While attempting to avoid Dries Vanthoor, Mathieu Jaminet was unsighted and crashed into a wall, sustaining minor damage to his car's left door. Farfus was forced to stop after that. Four manufacturers occupied the first five positions in the second practice session on the morning of November 16, with Bamber setting the fastest lap in the No. 912 Manthey Racing Porsche 911 GT3 R at 2:17.436 with three minutes remaining after adjustments and tyre changes. Second through fifth were Engel, Frijns, Laurens Vanthoor, and Farfus. When Haase lost control of his vehicle and collided with the barrier at the R Bend turn, the session ended prematurely.

== Qualifying ==
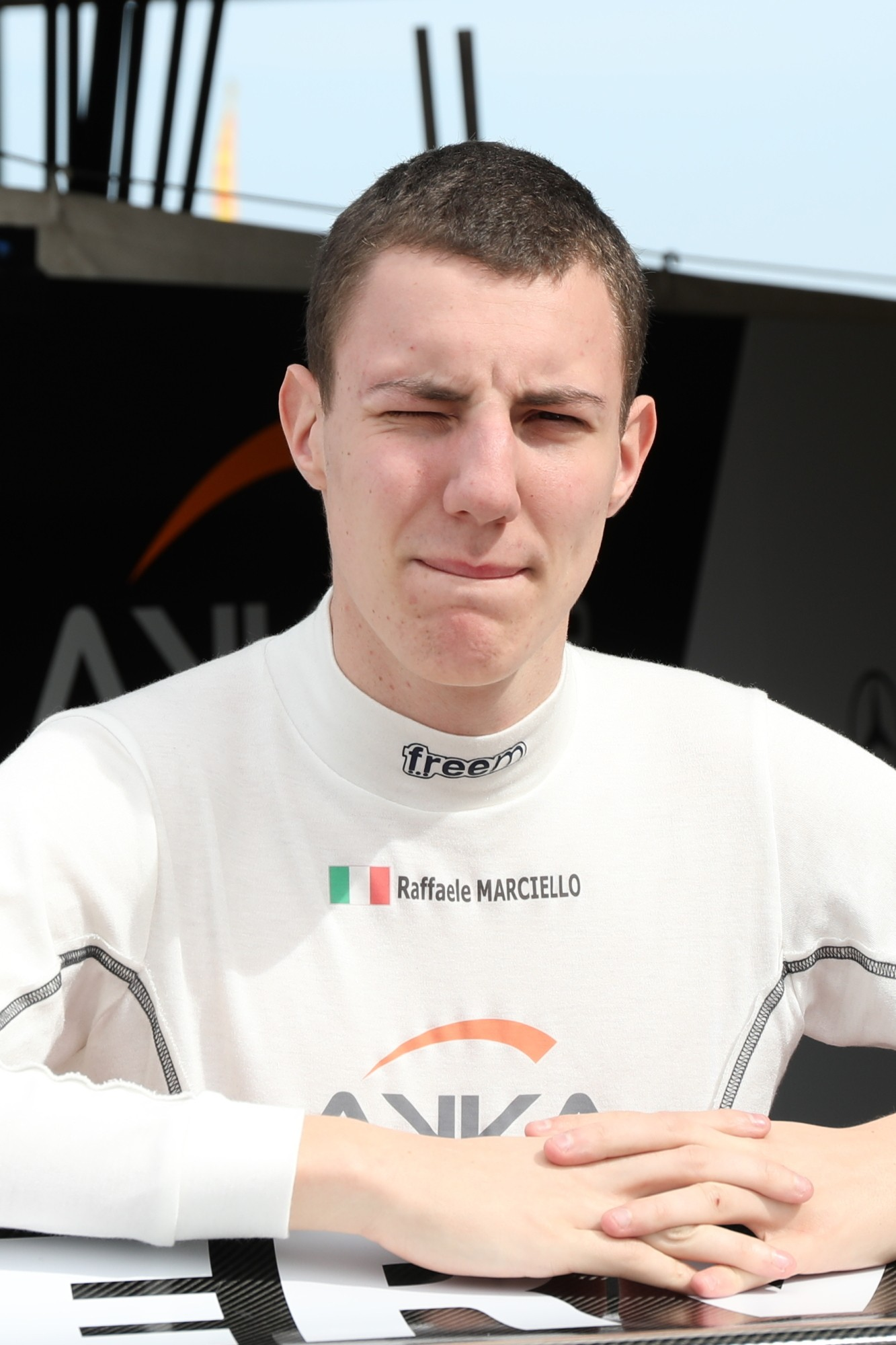
Raffaele Marciello set the fastest lap in qualifying to start from pole position.

Friday afternoon's half-hour qualifying session determined the qualification race's starting order through each driver's fastest lap times. Conditions were cool for qualifying. Raffaele Marciello's No. 999 GruppeM Racing Mercedes-AMG GT3 took pole position in his second race in Macau, as the only driver to go under 2:17 on his final timed lap at 2:16.8 time on his final timed lap. It was his second pole position in Macau since the 2013 Macau Grand Prix. Marciello demoted Farfus from pole to second, despite the latter lapping faster with two minutes remaining. Following late-session improvements and a battle between both drivers, Engel took third and Mortara was fourth, giving Mercedes three positions in the top four. Manthey's Bamber and Laurens Vanthoor were fifth and sixth, with Audi drivers Frijns, Haase, and Dries Vanthoor seventh through ninth. Jaminet qualified tenth. Alexandre Imperatori took 11th, followed by Adderly Fong and Darryl O'Young from Hong Kong in 12th and 13th. Jarvis qualified 14th in his first Macau race since winning the 2007 Macau Grand Prix and Tsugio Matsuda in 15th completed the starting order. Frijns outbraked himself at Lisboa corner and crashed into the barrier during qualifying, necessitating the use of a localised yellow flag with less than three minutes remaining.

=== Post-qualifying ===
The FIA changed the performance balance again before the qualifying race, reducing the minimum ballast of the three KCMG-fielded Nissan GT-R Nismo GT3s by 20 kg (44 lb) for better handling. The vehicles' performance was also improved, with turbocharger boost increases across the board. O'Young started from the back of the field after changing engines after qualifying.

=== Qualifying classification ===
Final qualifying classification
Pos.	Class	No.	Driver	Team	Manufacturer	Time	Gap
1	P	999	Raffaele Marciello (ITA)	Mercedes-AMG Team GruppeM Racing	Mercedes-Benz	2:16.800	–
2	P	42	Augusto Farfus (BRA)	BMW Team Schnitzer	BMW	2:17.357	+0.557
3	P	888	Maro Engel (DEU)	Mercedes-AMG Team GruppeM Racing	Mercedes-Benz	2:17.422	+0.622
4	P	1	Edoardo Mortara (CHE)	Mercedes-AMG Team GruppeM Racing	Mercedes-Benz	2:17.431	+0.631
5	P	912	Earl Bamber (NZL)	Manthey Racing	Porsche	2:17.717	+0.917
6	P	911	Laurens Vanthoor (BEL)	Manthey Racing	Porsche	2:17.848	+1.048
7	P	66	Robin Frijns (NLD)	Audi Sport Team WRT Speedstar	Audi	2:18.042	+1.242
8	P	28	Christopher Haase (DEU)	Audi Sport Team Rutronik	Audi	2:18.579	+1.779
9	G	88	Dries Vanthoor (BEL)	Audi Sport Team WRT Speedstar	Audi	2:18.674	+1.894
10	G	991	Mathieu Jaminet (FRA)	Craft-Bamboo Racing	Porsche	2:19.249	+2.449
11	G	18	Alexandre Imperatori (HKG)	KCMG	Nissan	2:19.321	+2.521
12	G	77	Adderly Fong (HKG)	Zun Motorsport Crew	Audi	2:20.000	+3.200
13	S	55	Darryl O'Young (HKG)	Craft-Bamboo Racing	Porsche	2:20.337	+3.537 (Note: Darryl O'Young began from the back of the field for the Qualification Race due to an engine switch.)
14	P	35	Oliver Jarvis (GBR)	KCMG	Nissan	2:20.411	+3.611
15	P	23	Tsugio Matsuda (JPN)	KCMG	Nissan	2:21.710	+4.910

Categorisation
Icon	Class
P	Platinum
G	Gold
S	Silver

== Qualifying race ==
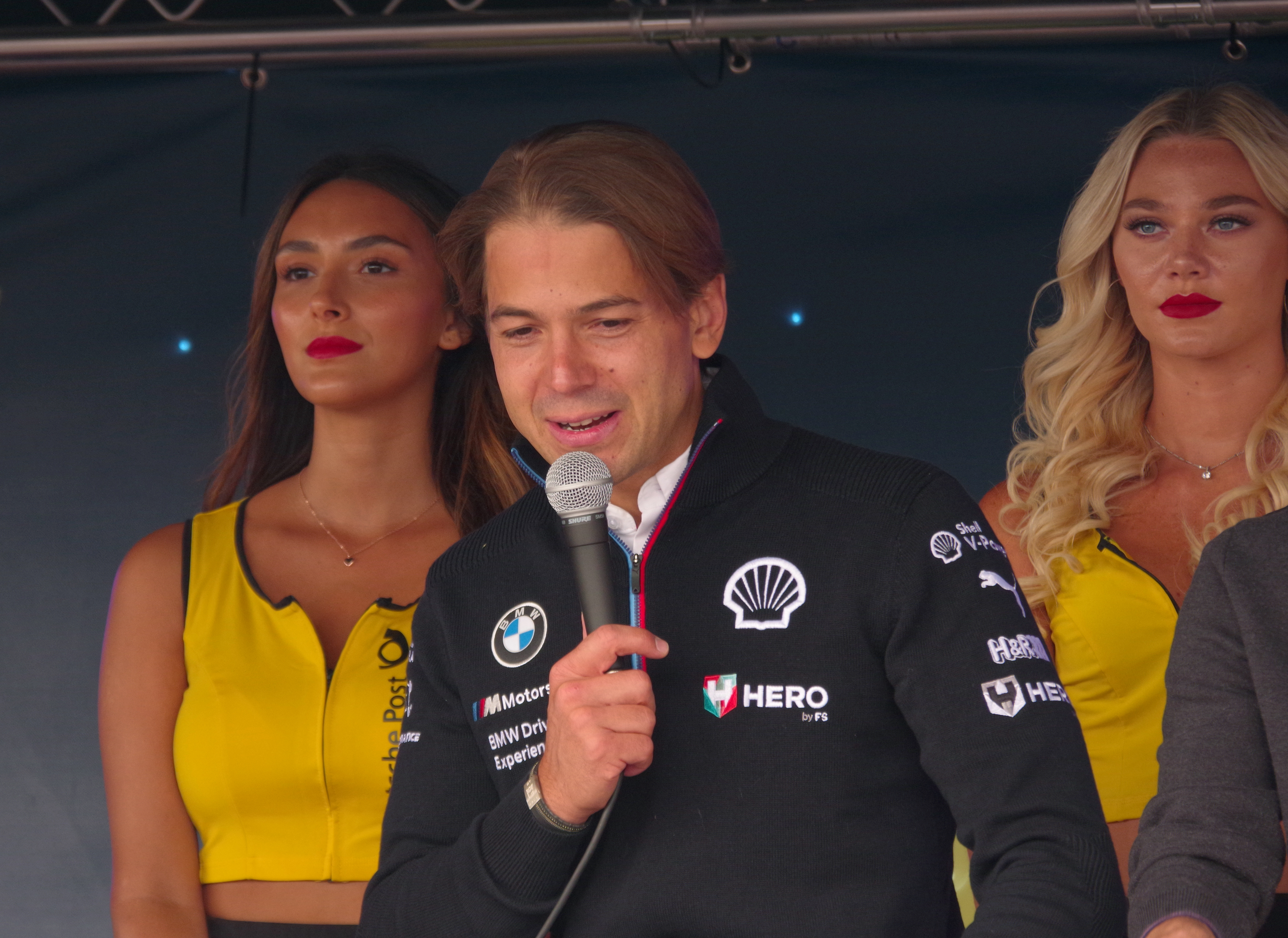
Augusto Farfus won both the qualification and the main race to achieve his first victory in Macau since 2009.

The qualifying race to determine the main race's starting order began at 13:05 Macau Standard Time (UTC+08:00) on November 17 under overcast conditions of 23 °C (73 °F). Matsuda failed to start because smoke billowed from the front of his car as the formation lap began. Farfus had a better start than Marciello and took the lead on the outside into Mandarin Bend corner. The safety car was dispatched almost immediately for a three-car collision. Laurens Vanthoor and Mortara collided as Mortara was defending from Vanthoor and Bamber on both sides into Mandarin Bend turn. Mortara swerved to the right as Bamber did the same, colliding with Laurens Vanthoor. Vanthoor went into a half-spin on the entry to the corner, crashing sideways into the outside barrier and rolling back across the circuit. He was unhurt. Two laps were completed under safety car conditions to allow Laurens Vanthoor's car to be removed from the track before it was withdrawn for the third lap restart.

Farfus took longer than usual to resume racing speeds after steering his car from side to side on the back straight before the final turn. By the end of the third lap, he was consistently quicker than Marciello and had a second's advantage over him after a clean start, subsequently extending it to 2.5 seconds. Marciello set the race's fastest lap of 2:17.989 on lap seven to briefly threaten a comeback, but Farfus quickly responded by lapping four-tenths of a second faster on lap eight and then by seven-tenths of a second faster on lap nine, resetting the fastest lap to 2:17.987. Farfus could then gradually extend his lead, even though Marciello and his teammate Engel were faster in the track's mountain section. He won the 12-lap qualifying race, claiming pole position for the main race by 3.812 seconds over Marciello. The final classified finishers were Engel, Mortara, Bamber, Frijns, Haase, Dries Vanthoor, Jaminet, Imperatori, Fong, Jarvis and O'Young.

=== Qualification Race classification ===
Final classification of the qualifying race
Pos.	Class	No.	Driver	Team	Manufacturer	Laps	Time/Retired
1	P	42	Augusto Farfus (BRA)	BMW Team Schnitzer	BMW	12	29:35.782
2	P	999	Raffaele Marciello (ITA)	Mercedes-AMG Team GruppeM Racing	Mercedes-Benz	12	+3.812
3	P	888	Maro Engel (DEU)	Mercedes-AMG Team GruppeM Racing	Mercedes-Benz	12	+5.022
4	P	1	Edoardo Mortara (CHE)	Mercedes-AMG Team GruppeM Racing	Mercedes-Benz	12	+5.706
5	P	912	Earl Bamber (NZL)	Manthey Racing	Porsche	12	+6.296
6	P	66	Robin Frijns (NLD)	Audi Sport Team WRT Speedstar	Audi	12	+13.102
7	P	28	Christopher Haase (DEU)	Audi Sport Team Rutronik	Audi	12	+13.652
8	G	88	Dries Vanthoor (BEL)	Audi Sport Team WRT Speedstar	Audi	12	+14.232
9	G	991	Mathieu Jaminet (FRA)	Craft-Bamboo Racing	Porsche	12	+21.393
10	G	18	Alexandre Imperatori (HKG)	KCMG	Nissan	12	+25.067
11	G	77	Adderly Fong (HKG)	Zun Motorsport Crew	Audi	12	+28.790
12	P	35	Oliver Jarvis (GBR)	KCMG	Nissan	12	+32.084
13	S	55	Darryl O'Young (HKG)	Craft-Bamboo Racing	Porsche	12	+41.794
Ret	P	911	Laurens Vanthoor (BEL)	Manthey Racing	Porsche	0	Accident
Ret	P	23	Tsugio Matsuda (JPN)	KCMG	Nissan	0	Engine

== Main race ==
"This is a fantastic victory. It is 29 years to the day that my dad gave me my first motorcycle and to be here now winning the FIA GT World Cup is a very special moment. It's all the more special because Charly (Lamm) is here. We brought a small team to Macau but everyone here for BMW Motorsport has done a fantastic job. We had a plan and I think we executed it perfectly. I think it's the first time the GT has had a full green race as well. I knew I had the pace, I knew I had the package and that the start would be crucial for a good race. So, a lot of effort when into turn one; I wanted to keep the lead and that was pretty much it. I was just committed, fully committed to keeping my car on the track. In the last sector I got a good run on to the straight and we made it! It's our first GT World Cup."

— Augusto Farfus on winning the 2018 FIA GT World Cup.

On November 18, at 12:25 p.m. local time, the race began in overcast conditions. Laurens Vanthoor was forced to withdraw from the rest of the event due to chassis damage sustained in his first lap accident with Mortara in the previous day's qualification race, resulting in his second consecutive weekend-ending crash. Farfus made a quick start from pole position and steered to the inside to maintain the lead over Marciello entering the first turn. As Farfus entered Lisboa corner, Maricello applied pressure, but he was unable to overtake him and remained second. Behind Farfus and Maricello, Mortara and his teammate Engel were third and fourth with Bamber fifth. Bamber collided with the barrier at the Solitude Esses on the second lap but continued without damaging his vehicle. Farfus had opened up a more than one-second lead over Marciello by the lap's conclusion. Following the first four laps, Marciello drew close to Farfus and was able to put pressure on the race leader by closely following him. Marciello was able to lap faster in the circuit's mountain areas, but he failed to close up enough to Farfus to attempt a pass. Marciello hit the barrier while attempting to turn into Lisboa turn on the eighth lap after braking late for the turn and running deep. He returned to the track without necessitating the yellow flags and dropped to tenth. The accident promoted Engel to second, behind Farfus.

To distract Farfus, Engel frequently used light flashing. Throughout most of the rest of the race, he stayed within a second of Farfus, who countered with his BMW's higher straightline speed over Engel's Mercedes-Benz exiting the final turn. Matsuda passed O'Young for 13th on lap 11, while Marciello passed Imperatori for ninth and Jaminet passed Dries Vanthoor for seventh on the following lap. With two laps remaining, Engel made a braking error for the Melco hairpin, increasing Farfus' lead. Farfus eventually led all 18 laps to achieve his first Macau victory since the 2009 Guia Race of Macau, his fourth in Macau, and his first GT victory on the Guia Circuit. BMW became the third manufacturer to win the FIA GT World Cup since it was granted FIA status in 2015. Engel followed 0.981 seconds later in second. His teammate Mortara, whose car lacked downforce and pace, finished third after overcoming an early race error at Police bend. Bamber in fourth was the final car in the lead pack. Frijns was the highest-placed Audi driver, finishing fifth, giving four manufacturers a presence in the top five. Frijns finished two seconds ahead of Haase, who was sixth. Jaminet and Dries Vanthoor finished seventh and eighth, respectively, with Marciello ninth. Imperatori was the highest-finishing Nissan driver, finishing tenth. The final four finishers were Fong, Jarvis (who was off the pace all weekend), Matuda, and O'Young. During a race with no safety car deployments, only three overtakes happened.

=== Main Race classification ===
Final classification of the main race
Pos.	Class	No.	Driver	Team	Manufacturer	Laps	Time/Retired
1	P	42	Augusto Farfus (BRA)	BMW Team Schnitzer	BMW	18	41:45.992
2	P	888	Maro Engel (DEU)	Mercedes-AMG Team GruppeM Racing	Mercedes-Benz	18	+0.981
3	P	1	Edoardo Mortara (CHE)	Mercedes-AMG Team GruppeM Racing	Mercedes-Benz	18	+1.823
4	P	912	Earl Bamber (NZL)	Manthey Racing	Porsche	18	+3.283
5	P	66	Robin Frijns (NLD)	Audi Sport Team WRT Speedstar	Audi	18	+4.549
6	P	28	Christopher Haase (DEU)	Audi Sport Team Rutronik	Audi	18	+6.588
7	G	991	Mathieu Jaminet (FRA)	Craft-Bamboo Racing	Porsche	18	+20.504
8	G	88	Dries Vanthoor (BEL)	Audi Sport Team WRT Speedstar	Audi	18	+21.449
9	P	999	Raffaele Marciello (ITA)	Mercedes-AMG Team GruppeM Racing	Mercedes-Benz	18	+23.009
10	G	18	Alexandre Imperatori (HKG)	KCMG	Nissan	18	+31.147
11	G	77	Adderly Fong (HKG)	Zun Motorsport Crew	Audi	18	+41.960
12	P	35	Oliver Jarvis (GBR)	KCMG	Nissan	18	+43.391
13	P	23	Tsugio Matsuda (JPN)	KCMG	Nissan	18	+1:03.531
14	S	55	Darryl O'Young (HKG)	Craft-Bamboo Racing	Porsche	18	+1:08.268
DNS	P	911	Laurens Vanthoor (BEL)	Manthey Racing	Porsche	0	Accident (Note: Laurens Vanthoor did not start the Main Race because the chassis of his car sustained too much damage in an accident during the Qualification Race.)

== See also ==
- 2018 Macau Grand Prix
