= 2006 Formula Renault 2.0 Italia =

Motor racing competition

Seasons
- ← 2005 2007 →

The 2006 Formula Renault 2.0 Italia was the seventh season of the Formula Renault 2.0 Italia series. Dani Clos would win the championship driving for Jenzer Motorsport. Cram Competition won the teams championship.

Jaime Alguersuari would win the winter series for Cram Competition.

== Drivers and Teams ==
2006 Entry List
Team	No.	Driver name	Rounds
(Italy) Prema Powerteam	1	(Italy) Edoardo Mortara	All
(Italy) Prema Powerteam	2	(Netherlands) Henkie Waldschmidt	All
(Italy) Prema Powerteam	3	(United Kingdom) Martin Plowman	All
(Italy) BVM Minardi Team	4	(Italy) Daniel Zampieri	4-8
(Italy) BVM Minardi Team	6	(Italy) Pietro Gandolfi	6-8
(Italy) BVM Minardi Team	10	(Italy) Francesco Provenzano	1-6
(Italy) BVM Minardi Team	36	(Mexico) Pablo Sánchez López	All
(Italy) BVM Minardi Team	37	(Italy) Federico Muggia	1-3
(Italy) RP Motorsport	5	(Italy) Marco Mapelli	4-8
(Italy) RP Motorsport	27	(Italy) Matteo Chinosi	All
(Italy) RP Motorsport	29	(Netherlands) Danny Bleek	1-3
(Italy) RP Motorsport	31	(Finland) Mikael Forsten	1-5, 7-8
(San Marino) W&D Racing	7	(San Marino) Paolo Meloni	1-6, 8
(Italy) CO2 Motorsport	8	(Italy) Andrea Caldarelli	All
(Italy) CO2 Motorsport	23	(Belgium) Jonathan Thonon	All
(Italy) CO2 Motorsport	81	(Italy) Antonino Pellegrino	6-7
(Italy) CO2 Motorsport	90	(France) Michaël Rossi	8
(Italy) Viola Formula Racing	9	(Italy) Valerio Prandi	All
(Italy) Viola Formula Racing	12	(Italy) Riccardo Azzoli	8
(Italy) Cram Competition	11	(Italy) Gregorio Baracchi	1-3, 7-8
(Italy) Cram Competition	15	(Spain) Jaime Alguersuari	All
(Italy) Cram Competition	16	(Italy) Edoardo Piscopo	All
(Italy) Cram Competition	17	(South Africa) Adrian Zaugg	All
(Italy) Cram Competition	50	(Italy) Andrea Pellizzato	All
(Italy) IT Loox Racing Car	14	(Italy) Valentino Sebastiani	All
(Italy) IT Loox Racing Car	24	(Italy) Niki Sebastiani	All
(Italy) IT Loox Racing Car	32	(Italy) Riccardo Cinti	All
(Switzerland) Jenzer Motorsport	18	(Austria) Walter Grubmüller	1-6
(Switzerland) Jenzer Motorsport	19	(Italy) Marco Frezza	1-3
(Switzerland) Jenzer Motorsport	20	(Netherlands) Junior Strous	1-2
(Switzerland) Jenzer Motorsport	21	(Switzerland) Rahel Frey	1-3, 5-8
(Switzerland) Jenzer Motorsport	22	(Spain) Dani Clos	All
(Switzerland) Jenzer Motorsport	26	(Argentina) Néstor Girolami	8
(Switzerland) Jenzer Motorsport	51	(Italy) Marco Frezza	4-6
(Switzerland) Jenzer Motorsport	52	(Argentina) Lucas Benamo	3
(Italy) Tomcat Racing	20	(Netherlands) Junior Strous	6
(Italy) Tomcat Racing	25	(Italy) Gianluca Colombo	8
(Italy) Tomcat Racing	74	(Italy) Tobias Tauber	1-4
(Italy) Tomcat Racing	88	(Italy) Pasquale Di Sabatino	1-6
(Italy) Tomcat Racing	95	(Argentina) Augusto Scalbi	7-8
(Italy) Durango	28	(Italy) Niccolò Valentini	1, 3-4, 6, 8
(Italy) Durango	33	(Venezuela) Carlo Vudafieri	2-4, 6-8
(Italy) Kiwi ESP	33	(Venezuela) Carlo Vudafieri	1
(Italy) Kiwi ESP	99	(Venezuela) Johnny Cecotto Jr.	1-2
(Italy) AP Motorsport	39	(Romania) Mihai Marinescu	All
(Italy) Facondini Racing	44	(Spain) Oliver Campos-Hull	1-6
(Italy) Facondini Racing	45	(Spain) Daniel Campos-Hull	1-5
(Italy) Euronova Racing	46	(Italy) Filippo Ponti	All
(Italy) Euronova Racing	56	(Italy) Alberto Costa	All
(Italy) Euronova Racing	66	(Italy) Michele Caliendo	1-3, 5-8

== Calendar ==
Round	Race	Circuit	Date	Pole position	Fastest lap	Winning driver	Winning team
1	R1	(Italy) Mugello Circuit	March 25	(Italy) Andrea Caldarelli	(South Africa) Adrian Zaugg	(South Africa) Adrian Zaugg	(Italy) Cram Competition
1	R2	(Italy) Mugello Circuit	March 26		(South Africa) Adrian Zaugg	(South Africa) Adrian Zaugg	(Italy) Cram Competition
2	R1	(Italy) ACI Vallelunga Circuit	April 8	(Italy) Edoardo Piscopo	(Italy) Valentino Sebastiani	(South Africa) Adrian Zaugg	(Italy) Cram Competition
2	R2	(Italy) ACI Vallelunga Circuit	April 9		(Spain) Dani Clos	(Italy) Valentino Sebastiani	(Italy) IT Loox Racing Car
3	R1	(Italy) Autodromo Enzo e Dino Ferrari	May 21	(South Africa) Adrian Zaugg	(South Africa) Adrian Zaugg	(South Africa) Adrian Zaugg	(Italy) Cram Competition
3	R2	(Italy) Autodromo Enzo e Dino Ferrari	May 21	(South Africa) Adrian Zaugg	(Netherlands) Henkie Waldschmidt	(South Africa) Adrian Zaugg	(Italy) Cram Competition
4	R1	(Belgium) Circuit de Spa-Francorchamps	June 3	(Spain) Dani Clos	(Spain) Dani Clos	(Spain) Dani Clos	(Switzerland) Jenzer Motorsport
4	R2	(Belgium) Circuit de Spa-Francorchamps	June 4	(Spain) Dani Clos	(Italy) Edoardo Mortara	(Spain) Dani Clos	(Switzerland) Jenzer Motorsport
5	R1	(Germany) Hockenheimring	July 8	(United Kingdom) Martin Plowman	(Italy) Edoardo Piscopo	(Spain) Dani Clos	(Switzerland) Jenzer Motorsport
5	R2	(Germany) Hockenheimring	July 9	(Spain) Dani Clos	(Spain) Dani Clos	(Spain) Dani Clos	(Switzerland) Jenzer Motorsport
6	R1	(Italy) Misano World Circuit	July 23	(Spain) Dani Clos	(Spain) Dani Clos	(Spain) Dani Clos	(Switzerland) Jenzer Motorsport
6	R2	(Italy) Misano World Circuit	July 23	(Spain) Dani Clos	(Spain) Dani Clos	(Spain) Dani Clos	(Switzerland) Jenzer Motorsport
7	R1	(Italy) Autodromo Riccardo Paletti	September 17	(South Africa) Adrian Zaugg	(South Africa) Adrian Zaugg	(South Africa) Adrian Zaugg	(Italy) Cram Competition
8	R1	(Italy) Autodromo Nazionale Monza	October 7	(Netherlands) Henkie Waldschmidt	(South Africa) Adrian Zaugg	(Spain) Dani Clos	(Switzerland) Jenzer Motorsport
8	R2	(Italy) Autodromo Nazionale Monza	October 8	(Netherlands) Henkie Waldschmidt	(South Africa) Adrian Zaugg	(Spain) Dani Clos	(Switzerland) Jenzer Motorsport

== Championship standings ==
Each championship round included 2 or 3 races by rounds length of 30 minutes each. Points were awarded as follows:

Position	1st	2nd	3rd	4th	5th	6th	7th	8th	9th	10th
Points	30	24	20	16	12	10	8	6	4	2

In each race, 2 additional points were awarded for pole position, and 2 for fastest lap.

=== Drivers ===
Pos	Driver	(Italy) MUG		(Italy) VLL		(Italy) IMO		(Belgium) SPA		(Germany) HOC		(Italy) MIS		(Italy) VAR	(Italy) MNZ		Points
Pos	Driver	1	2	3	4	5	6	7	8	9	10	11	12	13	14	15	Points
1	(Spain) Dani Clos	6	4	2	12	3	3	1	1	1	1	1	1	2	1	1	378
2	(South Africa) Adrian Zaugg	1	1	1	3	1	1	2	Ret	26	3	3	3	1	4	2	342
3	(Italy) Edoardo Piscopo	3	2	3	5	2	2	24	2	25	4	2	2	4	2	3	256
4	(Italy) Edoardo Mortara	2	3	4	20	Ret	6	3	7	5	14	9	7	7	16	5	144
5	(United Kingdom) Martin Plowman	7	8	19	13	6	5	Ret	21	2	15	7	4	11	5	7	108
6	(Netherlands) Henkie Waldschmidt	9	7	5	Ret	Ret	7	5	Ret	Ret	8	11	6	10	3	4	106
7	(Italy) Valentino Sebastiani	30	Ret	Ret	1	26	11	4	Ret	8	10	4	9	6	8	11	92
8	(Italy) Niki Sebastiani	15	18	Ret	2	4	4	Ret	Ret	14	Ret	5	8	5	Ret	14	86
9	(Italy) Matteo Chinosi	8	9	8	6	7	9	7	19	3	5	13	13	Ret	Ret	15	80
10	(Spain) Jaime Alguersuari	19	14	10	21	5	13	6	3	20	11	18	5	12	Ret	10	56
11	(Romania) Mihai Marinescu	11	12	12	Ret	9	28	Ret	Ret	4	2	15	11		Ret	9	50
12	(Netherlands) Junior Strous	4	5	Ret	4							16	20				48
13	(Italy) Marco Frezza	28	22	6	Ret	Ret	8	Ret	4	24	13	6	10				44
14	(Italy) Andrea Caldarelli	Ret	Ret	9	10	Ret	14	22	6	Ret	Ret	17	19	3	13	12	38
15	(Italy) Federico Muggia	5	6	11	Ret	8	29										34
16	(Belgium) Jonathan Thonon	29	16	15	11	21	31	10	5	10	9	29	17	8	Ret	16	26
17	(Mexico) Pablo Sánchez López	18	11	7	Ret	18	12	23	Ret	9	Ret	19	16	9	6	Ret	26
18	(Switzerland) Rahel Frey	10	10	13	9	19	10			Ret	12	8	23	15	Ret	8	24
19	(Italy) Filippo Ponti	14	26	27	8	15	15	9	9	7	Ret	14	Ret	Ret			22
20	(Argentina) Néstor Girolami														7	6	18
21	(Austria) Walter Grubmüller	Ret	25	16	19	16	Ret	15	8	23	6	10	24				18
22	(Spain) Oliver Campos-Hull	Ret	24	Ret	Ret	13	16	8	11	12	7	12	12				14
23	(Spain) Daniel Campos-Hull	Ret	Ret			Ret	24	16	Ret	6	Ret						10
24	(Italy) Riccardo Cinti	17	13	Ret	7	22	21	Ret	10	13	Ret	Ret	Ret	13	15	17	10
25	(Italy) Alberto Costa	13	Ret	25	Ret	10	19	Ret	14	Ret	20	Ret	26	Ret	9	Ret	6
26	(Argentina) Augusto Scalbi													16	10	Ret	2
27	(Italy) Daniel Zampieri							17	18	11	17	Ret	18	Ret	12	13	0
28	(Italy) Andrea Pellizzato	16	15	DNS	Ret	11	20	25	16	15	19	25	Ret	Ret	14	Ret	0
29	(San Marino) Paolo Meloni	20	19	28	16	17	18	11	15	18	18	27	21		Ret	20	0
30	(Italy) Cristian Corsini														11	18	0
31	(Italy) Pasquale Di Sabatino	12	Ret	14	Ret	27	32	12	Ret	16	22	20	14				0
32	(Italy) Valerio Prandi	21	23	18	Ret	12	23	Ret	12	17	Ret	Ret	22	17	Ret	21	0
33	(Italy) Francesco Provenzano	22	17	DNS	14	14	Ret	14	13	Ret	Ret	Ret	Ret				0
34	(Italy) Marco Mapelli							21	13	21	16	26	15	14	Ret	27	0
35	(Italy) Tobias Tauber	23	20	17	15	20	22	18	17								0
36	(Finland) Mikael Forsten	24	21	22	17	24	25	19	Ret	22	23			18	Ret	24	0
37	(Italy) Riccardo Azzoli														17	19	0
38	(Argentina) Lucas Benamo					Ret	17										0
39	(Italy) Michele Caliendo	26	Ret	23	18	Ret	Ret	19	21			23	27	21	21	23	0
40	(Italy) Gianluca Colombo														18	Ret	0
41	(Venezuela) Carlo Vudafieri	Ret	Ret	20	Ret	Ret	26	21	Ret			22	Ret	19	22	25	0
42	(Italy) Gregorio Baracchi	25	Ret	26	Ret	Ret	Ret							20	19	Ret	0
43	(Italy) Niccolò Valentini	Ret	Ret			25	27	20	20			24	28		20	22	0
44	(Italy) Andrea Pellegrino											21	25	Ret			0
45	(Venezuela) Johnny Cecotto Jr.	Ret	27	21	Ret												0
46	(Netherlands) Danny Bleek	27	Ret	24	Ret	23	30										0
47	(Italy) Pietro Gandolfi											28	29	Ret	23	26	0

=== Teams ===
Pos	Team	Points
1	(Italy) Cram Competition	674
2	(Switzerland) Jenzer Motorsport	518
3	(Italy) Prema Powerteam	358
4	(Italy) IT Loox Racing	188
5	(Italy) RP Motorsport	78
6	(Italy) CO2 Motorsport	64
7	(Italy) BVM Minardi	56
8	(Italy) AP Motorsport	48
9	(Italy) Euronova Racing	30
10	(Italy) Facondini Racing	26
11	(Italy) Tomcat Racing	2

== Winter Series ==
The winter series was made up of two meetings both at Vallelunga with two races each.

- Point system : 32, 28, 24, 22, 20, 18, 16, 14, 12, 10, 8, 6, 4, 2, 1 for 15th. In each race 2 point for Fastest lap and 2 for Pole position.
- Races : 2 race by rounds length of 30 minutes each.

Pos	Driver	Team	(Italy) VAL Nov 11–12		(Italy) VAL Nov 18–19		Points
Pos	Driver	Team	1	2	3	4	Points
1	(Spain) Jaime Alguersuari	Cram Competition	1	1	1	1	142
2	(Italy) Frankie Provenzano	BVM Minardi	2	2	3	4	102
3	(Spain) Roberto Merhi	It Loox Racing	3	7	2	3	92
4	(Italy) Mirko Bortolotti	RP Motorsport	8	4	4	2	88
5	(Italy) Michele Faccin	CO2 Motorsport	5	12	6	5	64
6	(Italy) Riccardo Cinti	It Loox Racing	10	3	9	7	62
7	(Spain) Aleix Alcaraz	Cram Competition	11	5	5	9	60
8	(Ecuador) Sebastián Merchán	Facondini Racing	6	9	7	8	60
9	(Italy) Nicola de Marco	Durango	9	8	8	10	50
10	(Italy) Daniel Zampieri	BVM Minardi	4	21	10	6	50
11	(France) Cédric Sbirrazzuoli	Durango	12	6	16	12	30
12	(Ecuador) Henry Taleb Jr.	Facondini Racing	7	22	12	20	22
13	(Bulgaria) Simeon Ivanov	CO2 Motorsport	19	10	13	11	22
14	(Romania) Matei Mihaescu	CO2 Motorsport	13	13	11	19	16
15	(Italy) Federico Leo	RP Motorsport	14	11	Ret	13	14
16	(Italy) Marco Visconti	Dynamic Engineering			14	14	4
17	(Italy) Alessia Belometti	AP Motorsport	21	14	Ret	18	2
18	(Belgium) Jonathan Dhaese	CO2 Motorsport	15	15			2
19	(Italy) Alberto Bassi	Dynamic Engineering	17	17	15	21	1
20	(Austria) Bianca Steiner	Team Steiner	Ret	23	Ret	15	1
21	(Italy) Nicola Zonzini	RP Motorsport	16	20	17	16	0
22	(Italy) Andrea Roda	Tomcat Racing	22	16	Ret	23	0
23	(Italy) Natale Marzullo	It Loox Racing	20	18	19	17	0
24	(Italy) Giovanni Nava	Cram Competition	18	19	18	22	0
