= 2017 FIA GT World Cup =

3rd World Cup for GT3-spec sports cars in Macau

Race details
Date	19 November 2017
Official name	SJM Macau GT Cup – FIA GT World Cup
Location	Guia Circuit, Macau
Course	Temporary street circuit 6.120 km (3.803 mi)
Distance	Qualification Race; 11 laps, 67.320 km (41.831 mi); Main Race; 18 laps, 110.160 km (68.450 mi)
- Qualification Race

Pole
Driver	(Switzerland) Edoardo Mortara	Mercedes-AMG Team Driving Academy
Time	2:17.565

Fastest lap
Driver	(Netherlands) Robin Frijns	Audi Sport Team WRT
Time	2:19.153 (on lap 10)

Podium
First	(Switzerland) Edoardo Mortara	Mercedes-AMG Team Driving Academy
Second	(Brazil) Augusto Farfus	BMW Team Schnitzer
Third	(Italy) Raffaele Marciello	Mercedes-AMG Team GruppeM Racing
- Main Race

Pole
Driver	(Switzerland) Edoardo Mortara	Mercedes-AMG Team Driving Academy

Fastest lap
Driver	(Germany) Maro Engel	Mercedes-AMG Team GruppeM Racing
Time	2:20.196 (on lap 17)

Podium
First	(Switzerland) Edoardo Mortara	Mercedes-AMG Team Driving Academy
Second	(Netherlands) Robin Frijns	Audi Sport Team WRT
Third	(Germany) Maro Engel	Mercedes-AMG Team GruppeM Racing

The 2017 FIA GT World Cup (formally the SJM Macau GT Cup – FIA GT World Cup) was a non-championship Grand Touring (GT) sports car race held on the streets of the Macau autonomous territory on 19 November 2017. It was the event's third edition, and the tenth Macau GT3-specification cars race. The Automobile General Association Macau-China appointed the motorsports organiser Stéphane Ratel Organisation (SRO) to form a grid for the race. The race itself consisted of an 11-lap qualifying race that set the starting order for the 18-lap main race.

Mercedes-AMG Team Driving Academy's Edoardo Mortara won the main race from pole position in a Mercedes-AMG GT3 after winning the Qualification Race the afternoon before. Mortara led from the start and every lap of the main race to achieved his sixth Macau victory. Second place was taken by the highest-placed rookie, Robin Frijns, driving an Audi R8 LMS for Audi Sport Team WRT. Maro Engel of Mercedes-AMG Team GruppeM Racing completed the podium in third.

== Background and entry list ==
The 2017 FIA GT World Cup was the event's third iteration and the eleventh time GT3 vehicles had raced in Macau. It was held on the 6.2 km (3.9 mi) 22-turn Guia Circuit on 19 November 2017 with three preceding days of practice and qualifying. Following the 2016 iteration, in which an accident involving Laurens Vanthoor curtailed the race and time constraints meant that all scheduled laps could not be completed, the FIA moved the first race of the 2017 Guia Race of Macau from Sunday morning to Saturday afternoon to increase the likelihood that the race would run for all 18 scheduled laps. Manufacturer-supported teams with professional drivers rated platinum or gold were permitted to compete as part of organiser Stéphane Ratel Organisation's goal of having a World Cup event for professionals and one for amateurs. Safety and trackside recovery procedures were enhanced. Following the 2016 race, some kerbs at turns one and two were modified for safety reasons, and TecPro energy absorption barriers were installed.

Drivers had to have competed in a Fédération Internationale de l'Automobile (FIA)-regulated GT3-based championship race in the preceding two seasons or have substantial experience in Grand Touring (GT) cars to enter the FIA GT World Cup in Macau. Only drivers with a platinum or gold racing licence could compete, with silver-ranked drivers eligible on a case-by-case basis at the FIA GT World Cup Committee's discretion. Bronze-level competitors were not permitted to compete. Pirelli was the race's control tyre supplier and drivers were permitted to use five sets of slick tyres and three sets of wet-weather tyres.

On 24 October 2017, the entry list was made public. Twenty drivers from 13 nations raced, representing seven brands (Audi, BMW, Ferrari, Honda, Lamborghini, Mercedes-AMG, and Porsche). It featured defending winner Vanthoor, 2016–17 Formula E champion Lucas di Grassi, 2016 FIA World Endurance co-champion Romain Dumas, Blancpain GT Series champion Mirko Bortolotti, two-time Deutsche Tourenwagen Masters champion Marco Wittmann, and 2014 Bathurst 1000 co-winner Chaz Mostert.

== Practice and qualifying ==
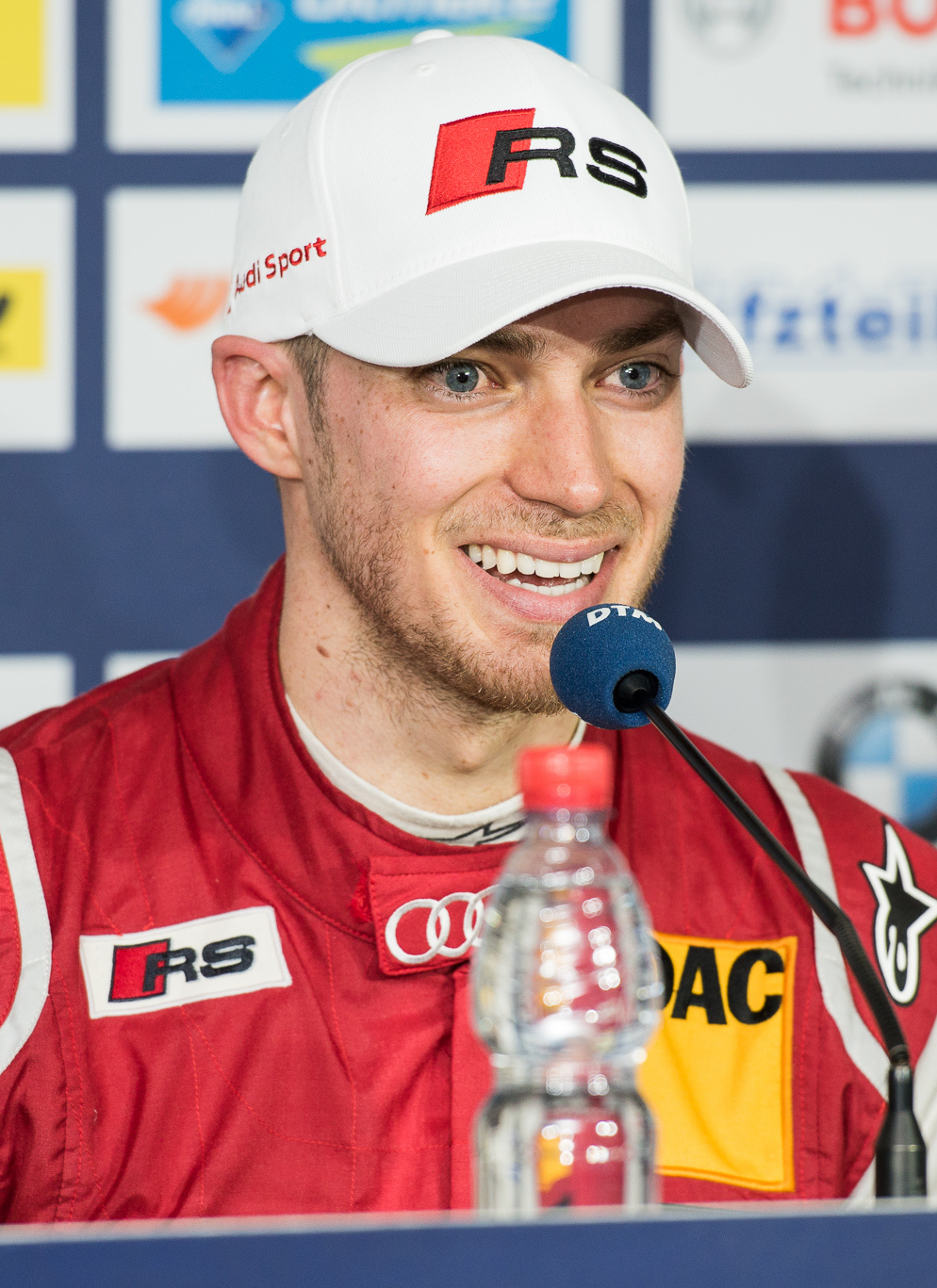
Edoardo Mortara (pictured in 2014) took his second successive pole position in Macau and he went on to win the Qualifying Race and the Main Race.

There was one 30-minute practice session each on Thursday morning and Friday morning preceding Sunday's race. In the first practice session, Maro Engel's No. 999 Mercedes-AMG Team GruppeM Racing car lapped fastest at 2:18.948 on his final lap. Raffaele Marciello's sister No. 888 car was second, Edoardo Mortara's No. 48 Mercedes-AMG Team Driving Academy third, the No. 63 Scuderia Corsa Ferrari 488 of Felix Rosenqvist fourth and Robin Frijns' No. 1 Audi Sport Team WRT R8 LMS fifth. Daniel Juncadella, Markus Pommer, Augusto Farfus, Nico Müller and Darryl O'Young filled positions six through ten as the four Mercedes were within the top six. With ten minutes remaining, Di Grassi lost control of his car and collided with a barrier alongside the circuit in the track's mountain section, but he continued with minor damage.

Frijns led the second practice session with a 2:18.507 lap, ahead of Audi brandmate Pommer in second. Farfus, Juncadella, Müller, Engel, Marciello, di Grassi, Bortolotti and Vanthoor completed the top ten drivers. Pommer spun through 360 degrees on the kerb on the inside of Mandarin Bend corner at more than 250 kilometres per hour (160 mph). He narrowly avoided hitting the wall, and practice was not stopped. Fabian Plentz spun and caused the first stoppage, but he recovered and returned to the pit lane. When Hiroki Yoshimoto crashed his Porsche 911 at Solitude Esses turn and was in a dangerous position, a second red flag appeared.

Friday afternoon's half-hour qualifying session set the starting grid for the qualification race through each driver's fastest lap times. Mercedes-AMG took the first four places in fading light, with Mortara leading for most of qualifying to take his second consecutive pole position in Macau with a lap of 2:17.565 set in the final minutes, which was the race's fastest overall lap. His teammate Juncadella joined him on the grid's front row and Team GruppeM Racing's Engel and Marciello were third and fourth to complete a Mercedes sweep of the first four positions. Müller was the quickest Audi driver in fifth. eight-thousands of a second behind Marciello. Tom Blomqvist's No. 99 Rowe Racing car qualified seventh, behind brandmate Farfus' No. 18 BMW Team Schnitzer M6 GT3 in sixth. Pommer, eighth, was the highest-placed silver ranked driver. Vanthoor's No. 911 Craft-Bamboo Racing car and di Grassi's No. 11 HCB-Rutronik Racing car were ninth and tenth. Rosenqvist was the fastest driver not to qualify in the top ten due to a car set-up error. Renger van der Zande's No. 84 Honda NSX was 12th, with Wittmann's No. 91 FIST Team AAI car in 13th. Bortolotti's Lamborghini Huracán GT3, Dumas and O'Young's Porsche, Frijns and Plentz's Audi, and Mostert's BMW were the last drivers to set a qualifying lap. Yoshimoto did not record a lap time because his team was unable to repair his car after a crash in the second practice session. Two drivers had incidents, but the session ended without the need for a stoppage. A malfunctioning anti-lock braking system caused Frijns to crash into the wall at Fisherman's Bend, but he slowly returned to the pit lane for repairs. Vanthoor crashed into the inside barrier at Fisherman's Bend turn at the end of the session.

Following qualifying, the FIA altered the balance of performance in an attempt to achieve parity. The weight of the Mercedes-AMGs was increased from 1,330 kg (2,930 lb) to 1,360 kg (3,000 lb) and the weight of the Honda NSX was increased from 1,275 kg (2,811 lb) to 1,280 kg (2,820 lb).

=== Qualifying classification ===
Final qualifying classification
Pos.	Class	No.	Driver	Team	Manufacturer	Time	Gap
1	P	48	(Switzerland) Edoardo Mortara	(Germany) Mercedes-AMG Team Driving Academy	Mercedes-Benz	2:17.565	—
2	P	50	(Spain) Daniel Juncadella	(Germany) Mercedes-AMG Team Driving Academy	Mercedes-Benz	2:17.847	+0.282
3	P	999	(Germany) Maro Engel	(Hong Kong) Mercedes-AMG Team GruppeM Racing	Mercedes-Benz	2:17.946	+0.381
4	P	888	(Italy) Raffaele Marciello	(Hong Kong) Mercedes-AMG Team GruppeM Racing	Mercedes-Benz	2:17.998	+0.433
5	P	2	(Switzerland) Nico Müller	(Belgium) Audi Sport Team WRT	Audi	2:18.006	+0.441
6	P	18	(Brazil) Augusto Farfus	(Germany) BMW Team Schnitzer	BMW	2:18.075	+0.510
7	P	99	(United Kingdom) Tom Blomqvist	(Germany) Rowe Racing	BMW	2:18.306	+0.741
8	S	27	(Germany) Markus Pommer	(Germany) Aust Motorsport	Audi	2:18.604	+1.039
9	P	911	(Belgium) Laurens Vanthoor	(Hong Kong) Craft-Bamboo Racing	Porsche	2:18.657	+1.092
10	P	11	(Brazil) Lucas di Grassi	(Germany) HCB-Rutronik-Racing	Audi	2:18.837	+1.272
11	P	63	(Sweden) Felix Rosenqvist	(United States) Scuderia Corsa	Ferrari	2:18.917	+1.352
12	P	84	(Netherlands) Renger van der Zande	(Japan) Honda Racing	Honda	2:19.231	+1.666
13	P	91	(Germany) Marco Wittmann	(Chinese Taipei) FIST Team AAI	BMW	2:19.272	+1.707
14	P	5	(Italy) Mirko Bortolotti	(China) FFF Racing Team by ACM	Lamborghini	2:19.396	+1.831
15	P	7	(France) Romain Dumas	(Chinese Taipei) HubAuto Racing	Porsche	2:20.072	+2.507
16	G	991	(Hong Kong) Darryl O'Young	(Hong Kong) Craft-Bamboo Racing	Porsche	2:20.128	+2.563
17	P	1	(Netherlands) Robin Frijns	(Belgium) Audi Sport Team WRT	Audi	2:20.587	+3.022
18	S	12	(Germany) Fabian Plentz	(Germany) HCB-Rutronik-Racing	Audi	2:21.472	+3.907
19	G	90	(Australia) Chaz Mostert	(Chinese Taipei) FIST Team AAI	BMW	2:24.076	+6.511
20	G	77	(Japan) Hiroki Yoshimoto	(Chinese Taipei) HubAuto Racing	Porsche	No time (Note: Hiroki Yoshimoto did not set a time in Qualifying, because the HubAuto Racing crew were unable to repair the car due to the amount of structural damage suffered during an accident in Free Practice 2.)	—

Categorisation
Icon	Class
P	Platinum
G	Gold
S	Silver

== Qualifying race ==
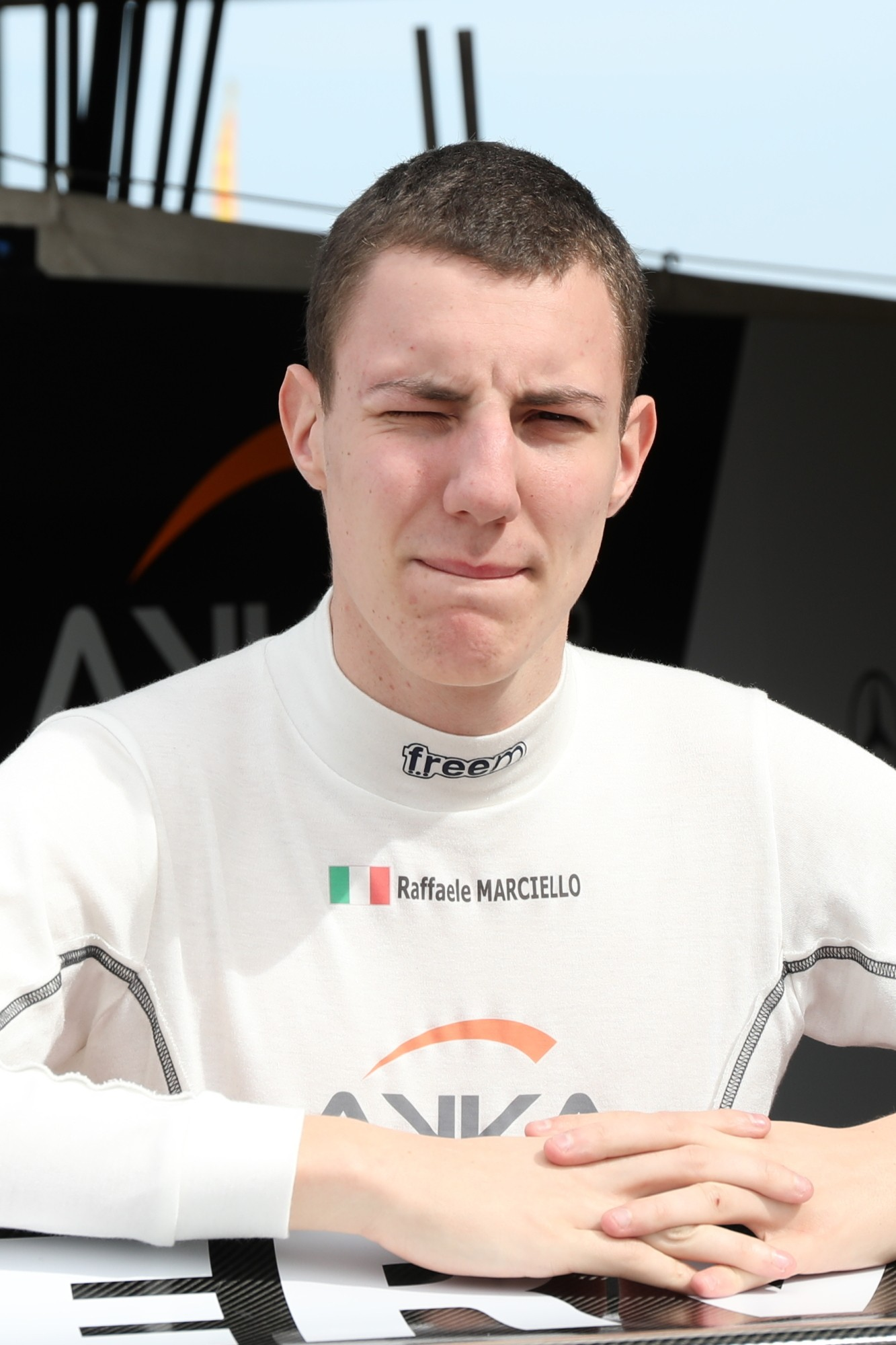
Raffaele Marciello (pictured in 2017) avoided a 16-car multi-car accident that stopped the Qualification Race for more than an hour.

The qualifying race to determine the main race's grid order in overcast, dry weather began on November 18 at 12:25 p.m. Macau Standard Time (UTC+08:00). Mortara fell behind Mercedes-AMG teammate Engel into Lisboa corner at the rolling start. Juncadella, another of Mortara's brandmates, attempted the same thing on the outside, but he knocked his steering arm out of alignment when he made contact with an outside barrier at Reservoir Bend turn. There was no immediate damage, but Juncadella's handling put him wide into an exit barrier as the field entered the right-hand Police Bend turn, considered one of the track's narrowest sections and a blind corner. Marciello narrowly avoided a collision with Juncadella, but Vanthoor was unsighted and understeered into Juncadella's stalled car's right-rear corner. A domino effect of accidents occurred behind Juncadella and prevented drivers behind him in the tightly crowded field from being able to avoid the resulting road block. Di Grassi's car was suspended on Wittmann's bonnet, close to Pommer.

No driver was seriously injured in the collision, but the race was immediately stopped for more than an hour so that track marshals could clear the circuit, and cars were extricated using cranes on the right side of the circuit. The accident involved four uninvolved drivers, and four more damaged cars were deemed repairable and returned to the track. With 25 minutes remaining, the race resumed behind the safety car at 13:20 local time. Because his car failed to start in the pit lane due to a battery failure, Engel's brandmate Mortara led the restart. When racing resumed on lap three, Mortara quickly established a small lead over Farfus, who pressured him but was unable to overtake him. As a result, Mortara won the qualification race after 11 laps and started the main race from pole position. Farfus came in second 1.566 seconds later, and Marciello rounded out the podium in third. Frijns in fourth unsuccessfully pressured Maricello, and the final classified finishers were Mostert, O'Young, Yoshimoto, and Engel.

=== Qualifying race classification ===
Final classification of the qualifying race
Pos.	Class	No.	Driver	Team	Manufacturer	Laps	Time/Retired
1	P	48	(Switzerland) Edoardo Mortara	(Germany) Mercedes-AMG Team Driving Academy	Mercedes-Benz	11	1:16:04.01
2	P	18	(Brazil) Augusto Farfus	(Germany) BMW Team Schnitzer	BMW	11	+1.566
3	P	888	(Italy) Raffaele Marciello	(Hong Kong) Mercedes-AMG Team GruppeM Racing	Mercedes-Benz	11	+2.794
4	P	1	(Netherlands) Robin Frijns	(Belgium) Audi Sport Team WRT	Audi	11	+4.974
5	G	90	(Australia) Chaz Mostert	(Chinese Taipei) FIST Team AAI	BMW	11	+7.129
6	G	991	(Hong Kong) Darryl O'Young	(Hong Kong) Craft-Bamboo Racing	Porsche	11	+34.873
7	G	77	(Japan) Hiroki Yoshimoto	(Chinese Taipei) HubAuto Racing	Porsche	11	+1:01.611
8	P	999	(Germany) Maro Engel	(Hong Kong) Mercedes-AMG Team GruppeM Racing	Mercedes-Benz	10	+1 Lap
Ret	P	50	(Spain) Daniel Juncadella	(Germany) Mercedes-AMG Team Driving Academy	Mercedes-Benz	0	Accident
Ret	P	2	(Switzerland) Nico Müller	(Belgium) Audi Sport Team WRT	Audi	0	Accident
Ret	P	99	(United Kingdom) Tom Blomqvist	(Germany) Rowe Racing	BMW	0	Accident
Ret	S	27	(Germany) Markus Pommer	(Germany) Aust Motorsport	Audi	0	Accident
Ret	P	911	(Belgium) Laurens Vanthoor	(Hong Kong) Craft-Bamboo Racing	Porsche	0	Accident
Ret	P	11	(Brazil) Lucas di Grassi	(Germany) HCB-Rutronik-Racing	Audi	0	Accident
Ret	P	63	(Sweden) Felix Rosenqvist	(United States) Scuderia Corsa	Ferrari	0	Accident
Ret	P	84	(Netherlands) Renger van der Zande	(Japan) Honda Racing	Honda	0	Accident
Ret	P	91	(Germany) Marco Wittmann	(Chinese Taipei) FIST Team AAI	BMW	0	Accident
Ret	P	5	(Italy) Mirko Bortolotti	(China) FFF Racing Team by ACM	Lamborghini	0	Accident
Ret	P	7	(France) Romain Dumas	(Chinese Taipei) HubAuto Racing	Porsche	0	Accident
Ret	S	12	(Germany) Fabian Plentz	(Germany) HCB-Rutronik-Racing	Audi	0	Accident

== Main race ==
The race began at 12:10 p.m. local time on November 19 on a wet track in overcast weather. Many teams worked overnight to repair the structural damage done to their cars in the qualification race accident so that their drivers could compete in the main event. Blomqvist, Bortolotti, Pommer, Plentz, Rosenqvist, and Vanthoor's cars, however, could not be repaired by their respective teams in Macau due to extensive structural damage and were withdrawn from the race, leaving 14 drivers to take the start. Because of the damp track caused by an earlier rain shower, the race director decided to start behind the safety car, allowing drivers to adjust to the changing conditions. At the end of lap two, the safety car was withdrawn, allowing drivers to overtake. Mortara made a clean getaway from the rolling start but went slightly wide at Reservoir Bend corner and hit the outside wall leaving the corner as he opened his steering wide so as to lose as little momentum as possible. He was however untroubled as Farfus could not get close enough to challenge him. At Lisboa turn, Marciello rammed Farfus from behind, causing Farfus to lose third place to Marciello. Farfus slowed, hit an barrier and the car's boot cover lifted.

Engel overtook Yoshimoto and O'Young to move into sixth on lap four. At the start of lap five, Marciello retired in the pit lane with smoke coming from the front of his car after sustaining radiator damage. The contact between Farfus and Marciello gave Mortara a six-second lead. On the sixth lap, track marshals waved a black flag with an orange disc to Farfus, instructing him to enter the pit lane and repair the loose car bodywork following the collision with Marciello. The safety car was deployed on the same lap because di Grassi hit the barrier through the Solitude Esses at high speed. He then stopped his car in the mountain section. Farfus made his pit stop under the safety car to remove his boot cover and dropped to the back of the field. Three laps were spent behind the safety car and Mortara maintained the lead at the lap 10-restart. When Farfus made his pit stop, Engel moved to fourth before passing Mostert for third on the outside at Lisboa corner. O'Young crashed on cold tyres leaving the hill to the right-hand San Francisco Bend turn half a lap later. Müller hit him, sending O'Young spinning into a barrier.

"My DTM season wasn't great, I had a pretty good start and then in the middle I got lost with set-up. I knew that it was ramping up for this race, and it looked pretty promising. I was doing more and more races in DTM, I was being more and more competitive in GT and I knew they always had a good car here. It was very important to win this race. It's a GT world cup and it can really save your season."

— Edoardo Mortara on winning the FIA GT World Cup after struggling in the 2017 Deutsche Tourenwagen Masters.

To allow O'Young's car to be removed from the circuit, the safety car was deployed until the end of lap eleven. At the restart, Mortara maintained his lead, with Frijns second. Engel slipstreamed Frijns to remain with him. Mostert slid wide after exiting the Solitude Esses, allowing the recovering Farfus to overtake him for fourth. Engel spent the next few laps close by Frijns but the latter established a rhythm and began to draw closer to Mortara, catching up to him on the final lap. However, Mortara led every lap achieved his sixth victory in Macau by 0.618 seconds over the closing Frijns who failed to overtake him. Engel finished third, Farfus fourth, and brandmates Mostert and Wittmann fifth and sixth. Dumas finished seventh, Juncadella eighth, and Yoshimoto was the final classified finisher. The attrition rate was moderate, with nine of the fourteen starters finishing the race, and the safety car was on track for six laps.

=== Post-race ===
In response to the sixteen car accident on the first lap of the qualification race, di Grassi called for a Global Positioning System (GPS) and accelerometer monitored automated warning system to caution drivers about an incident on the track. Drivers and fans of motor racing sharply criticised the proposal on social media because they perceived it as a system to slow the cars. Di Grassi said G-force sensors and accelerometers can determine whether a car has crashed, "By GPS positioning you can say if the car is in front of you or behind you. If the car is in front of you, there is a light on the dash that glows yellow automatically, without anyone having to press a button with the same information. We don't have the same race director and marshals, especially in the base categories and amateur series. So we need a system that reacts fast. A system like that may have avoided a lot of crashes because first you don't need to look for the flag, if you’re following someone. It's much brighter if something is in front of you. And then it does not react as a human component."

=== Main race classification ===
Final classification of the main race
Pos.	Class	No.	Driver	Team	Manufacturer	Laps	Time/Retired
1	P	48	(Switzerland) Edoardo Mortara	(Germany) Mercedes-AMG Team Driving Academy	Mercedes-Benz	18	51:52.822
2	P	1	(Netherlands) Robin Frijns	(Belgium) Audi Sport Team WRT	Audi	18	+0.618
3	P	999	(Germany) Maro Engel	(Hong Kong) Mercedes-AMG Team GruppeM Racing	Mercedes-Benz	18	+1.357
4	P	18	(Brazil) Augusto Farfus	(Germany) BMW Team Schnitzer	BMW	18	+12.312
5	G	90	(Australia) Chaz Mostert	(Chinese Taipei) FIST Team AAI	BMW	18	+13.041
6	P	91	(Germany) Marco Wittmann	(Chinese Taipei) FIST Team AAI	BMW	18	+18.031
7	P	7	(France) Romain Dumas	(Chinese Taipei) HubAuto Racing	Porsche	18	+22.616
8	P	50	(Spain) Daniel Juncadella	(Germany) Mercedes-AMG Team Driving Academy	Mercedes-Benz	18	+23.019
9	G	77	(Japan) Hiroki Yoshimoto	(Chinese Taipei) HubAuto Racing	Porsche	18	+54.804
Ret	P	2	(Switzerland) Nico Müller	(Belgium) Audi Sport Team WRT	Audi	11	Collision Damage
Ret	P	84	(Netherlands) Renger van der Zande	(Japan) Honda Racing	Honda	10	Collision Damage
Ret	G	991	(Hong Kong) Darryl O'Young	(Hong Kong) Craft-Bamboo Racing	Porsche	10	Collision Damage
Ret	P	11	(Brazil) Lucas di Grassi	(Germany) HCB-Rutronik-Racing	Audi	5	Accident
Ret	P	888	(Italy) Raffaele Marciello	(Hong Kong) Mercedes-AMG Team GruppeM Racing	Mercedes-Benz	4	Collision Damage
DNS	P	99	(United Kingdom) Tom Blomqvist	(Germany) Rowe Racing	BMW	—	Accident (Note: Tom Blomqvist, Mirko Bortolotti, Fabian Plentz, Markus Pommer, Felix Rosenqvist and Laurens Vanthoor did not start the Main Race, because teams were unable to repair the cars due to the amount of structural damage suffered during an accident in the Qualification Race.)
DNS	S	27	(Germany) Markus Pommer	(Germany) Aust Motorsport	Audi	—	Accident
DNS	P	911	(Belgium) Laurens Vanthoor	(Hong Kong) Craft-Bamboo Racing	Porsche	—	Accident
DNS	P	63	(Sweden) Felix Rosenqvist	(United States) Scuderia Corsa	Ferrari	—	Accident
DNS	P	5	(Italy) Mirko Bortolotti	(China) FFF Racing Team by ACM	Lamborghini	—	Accident
DNS	S	12	(Germany) Fabian Plentz	(Germany) HCB-Rutronik-Racing	Audi	—	Accident

== See also ==
- 2017 Macau Grand Prix
- 2017 Guia Race of Macau
