= Rutronik Racing =

German auto racing team

Coordinates: 48.951948571770885°N 8.579238556447379°E

(Germany) Rutronik Racing
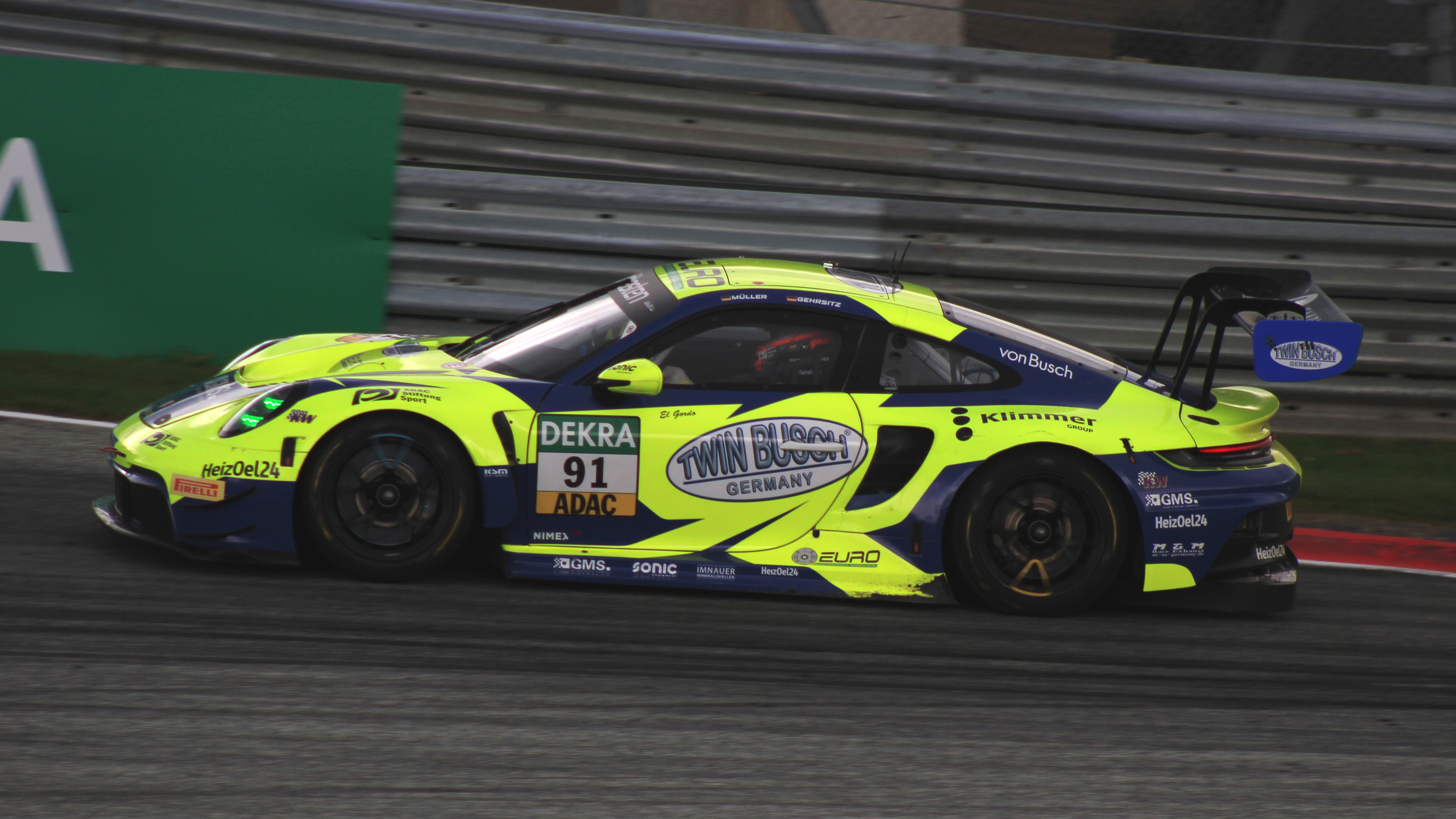
- Founded: 2010
- Founder(s): Hans-Christoph Behler
- Base: Remchingen
- Current series: GT World Challenge
- Former series: GT World Challenge Europe Endurance Cup
- Current drivers: (Hong Kong) Antares Au (Netherlands) Loek Hartog (Germany) Sven Müller (Switzerland) Patric Niederhauser (Belgium) Alessio Picariello (Sri Lanka) Eshan Pieris (Netherlands) Morris Schuring
- Teams' Championships: ADAC GTM (2019)
- Drivers' Championships: ADAC GTM (2019 (South Africa) Kelvin van der Linde)
- Website: https://rutronikracing.com

Rutronik Racing also known as HCB-Rutronik Racing is a German racing team from Remchingen. The team mainly competes in the GT World Challenge. The team was originally founded by Hans-Christoph Behler as HCB Management Gmbh, but was renamed following sponsorship from electronic components distributor Rutronik Elektronische Bauelemente GmbH

== History ==
Founded in 2010, the team competed in the FIA GT World Cup in 2018 as Audi Sport Team Rutronik. In 2019, the team entered the ADAC GT Masters. The team was a customer sport team from Audi Sport Customer Racing and used 10 Audi GT3 cars in two championships.

The racing team won the driver and team classification in its debut season in 2019.

Rutronik Racing fielded two Porsche 911 GT3 R in 2024.

== Results ==
=== ADAC GT Masters ===
Year	Car	Drivers	Points	D.C.	T.C.
2019	Audi R8 LMS Evo	(South Africa) Kelvin van der Linde (Switzerland) Patric Niederhauser	205	1st	1st
2019	Audi R8 LMS Evo	(Germany) Dennis Marschall (Germany) Carrie Schreiner	22	24th	1st
2020	Audi R8 LMS Evo	(South Africa) Kelvin van der Linde (Switzerland) Patric Niederhauser	160	4th	4th
2020	Audi R8 LMS Evo	(Germany) Dennis Marschall	33	24th	4th
2020	Audi R8 LMS Evo	(Germany) Carrie Schreiner	24	28th	4th
2020	Audi R8 LMS Evo	(Germany) Hamza Owega	9	36th	4th
2021	Audi R8 LMS Evo	(Germany) Dennis Marschall (Germany) Kim-Luis Schramm	85	11th	8th
2021	Audi R8 LMS Evo	(Germany) Elia Erhart	19	31st	8th
2021	Audi R8 LMS Evo	(Germany) Pierre Kaffer	11	38th	8th
2021	Audi R8 LMS Evo	(Italy) Mattia Drudi	8	39th	8th
2022	Audi R8 LMS Evo II	(Germany) Dennis Marschall (Germany) Kim-Luis Schramm	120	6th	5th
2022	Audi R8 LMS Evo II	(Germany) Luca Engstler (Switzerland) Patric Niederhauser	104	14th	5th

=== GT World Challenge Europe Sprint Cup ===
Year	Car	Catégory	Drivers	Points	Position	Catégory position
2024	Porsche 911 GT3 R	Pro	(Germany) Sven Müller (Switzerland) Patric Niederhauser	41	5th	5th
2024	Porsche 911 GT3 R	Bronze	(Germany) Dennis Marschall (United States) Dustin Blattner	0	NC	3rd
2025	Porsche 911 GT3 R	Pro	(Germany) Sven Müller (Switzerland) Patric Niederhauser	TBD	TBD	TBD
2025	Porsche 911 GT3 R	Silver	(Netherlands) Loek Hartog (Sri Lanka) Eshan Pieris	TBD	TBD	TBD

=== GT World Challenge Europe Endurance Cup ===
Year	Car	Catégory	Drivers	Points	Position	Catégory position
2021	Porsche 911 GT3 R	Pro	(France) Kévin Estre (Austria) Richard Lietz (Germany) Sven Müller	0	NC	NC
2023	Porsche 911 GT3 R	Pro	(Germany) Laurin Heinrich (Norway) Dennis Olsen (Austria) Thomas Preining	38	7th	7th
2024	Porsche 911 GT3 R	Pro	(Germany) Sven Müller (Switzerland) Patric Niederhauser (France) Julien Andlauer			
2024	Porsche 911 GT3 R	Bronze	(United States) Dustin Blattner (Netherlands) Loek Hartog (Germany) Dennis Marschall (Canada) Zacharie Robichon (Switzerland) Alexander Fach			
2025	Porsche 911 GT3 R	Pro	(Germany) Sven Müller (Switzerland) Patric Niederhauser (Belgium) Alessio Picariello	TBD	TBD	TBD
2025	Porsche 911 GT3 R	Bronze	(Hong Kong) Antares Au (Netherlands) Loek Hartog (Netherlands) Morris Schuring	TBD	TBD	TBD

== Former series results ==
=== FIA GT World Cup ===
Year	Car	Drivers	Position
2016	Audi R8 LMS	(Germany) Fabian Plentz	8th
2016	Audi R8 LMS	(Germany) Tommy Tulpe	18th
2017	Audi R8 LMS	(Brazil) Lucas di Grassi	DNF
2017	Audi R8 LMS	(Germany) Fabian Plentz	DNS
2018	Audi R8 LMS	(Germany) Christopher Haase	6th
2019	Audi R8 LMS Evo	(South Africa) Kelvin van der Linde	10th

=== 24 Hours of Spa ===
Year	Car	Category	Drivers	Position
2021	Porsche 911 GT3 R	Pro	(France) Kévin Estre (Austria) Richard Lietz (Germany) Sven Müller	DNF
2023	Porsche 911 GT3 R	Pro	(Germany) Laurin Heinrich (Norway) Dennis Olsen (Austria) Thomas Preining	5th
2024	Porsche 911 GT3 R	Pro	(France) Julien Andlauer (Germany) Sven Müller (Switzerland) Patric Niederhauser	9th
2024	Porsche 911 GT3 R	Bronze	(United States) Dustin Blattner (Netherlands) Loek Hartog (Germany) Dennis Marschall (Canada) Zacharie Robichon	DNF

=== 24 Hours of Nürburgring ===
Year	Car	Category	Drivers	Position
2021	Porsche 911 GT3 R	SP 9 Pro	(France) Julien Andlauer (France) Romain Dumas (Germany) Tobias Müller (Belgium) Laurens Vanthoor	DNF
2023	Porsche 911 GT3 R	SP 9 Pro	(France) Julien Andlauer (Italy) Matteo Cairoli (Norway) Dennis Olsen	5th
