= 2023 FIA GT World Cup =

Sixth World Cup for GT3-spec race cars in Macau

Race details
| Date | 19 November 2023 |
| Official name | Macau GT Cup – FIA GT World Cup |
| Location | Guia Circuit, Macau |
| Course | Temporary street circuit 6.120 km (3.803 mi) |
| Distance | Qualification Race; 12 laps, 73.440 km (45.634 mi); Main Race; 16 laps, 97.920 km (60.845 mi) |
- Qualification Race

Pole
| Driver | Raffaele Marciello (SUI) | Mercedes-AMG Team Landgraf |
| Time | 2:14.542 |

Fastest lap
| Driver | Edoardo Mortara (SUI) | Audi Sport Asia Team Absolute |
| Time | 2:16.593 |

Podium
| First | Raffaele Marciello (SUI) | Mercedes-AMG Team Landgraf |
| Second | Maro Engel (DEU) | Mercedes-AMG Team Craft-Bamboo Racing |
| Third | Edoardo Mortara (SUI) | Audi Sport Asia Team Absolute |
- Main Race

Fastest lap
| Driver | Daniel Serra (BRA) | Harmony Racing |
| Time | 2:16.051 |

Podium
| First | Raffaele Marciello (SUI) | Mercedes-AMG Team Landgraf |
| Second | Edoardo Mortara (SUI) | Audi Sport Asia Team Absolute |
| Third | Augusto Farfus (BRA) | ROWE Racing |

The 2023 FIA GT World Cup (formally the Macau GT Cup – FIA GT World Cup) was a Grand Touring (GT) sports car race held on the Guia Circuit in Macau on 19 November. It was the sixth FIA GT World Cup and the thirteenth GT3 car race held in Macau. The Automobile General Association Macau-China, the event's promoter, appointed the motorsports organiser SRO Motorsports Group to form a grid. The edition included two races: a 12-lap qualifying race and a 16-lap main event.

Raffaele Marciello of Mercedes-AMG Team Landgraf won both the qualifying and main races from pole position. Marciello led every lap of both races, winning his second consecutive FIA GT World Cup and becoming the race's first repeat winner. Edoardo Mortara of Audi Sport Asia Team Absolute took second place, and Augusto Farfus of ROWE Racing finished third.

== Background and entry list ==
The Fédération Internationale de l'Automobile (FIA) sanctioned the 2023 FIA GT World Cup, the event's sixth edition, the thirteenth race in Macau for GT3-specification vehicles, and an undercard to the 2023 Macau Grand Prix. It was held at the 6.120 km (3.803 mi) Guia Circuit in the streets of the Chinese special administrative region of Macau on 19 November after three days of practice and qualifying, and was co-organised by the SRO Motorsports Group at the FIA's request. The FIA (the governing body of motor racing), the Automobile General Association Macao-China (Macau's FIA member club), and the Macau Grand Prix Organizing Committee signed a three-year agreement to hold the race, which had been cancelled from 2020 to 2022 due to travel restrictions imposed on foreign visitors caused by the COVID-19 pandemic in Macau and was instead held as a non-FIA recognised event. This was in contrast to previous agreements which were one-year contracts. The FIA nominated Pirelli as the race's control tyre supplier on a three-year contract beginning in 2023. Each driver could use five sets of slick tyres and three sets of wet-weather tyres during the weekend.

Drivers had to have competed in an FIA-recognised GT3 championship race within the preceding two seasons or have considerable experience in Grand Touring (GT) cars to enter the event. Platinum, Gold, Silver, and Bronze-rated drivers were permitted to compete, but the FIA GT World Cup Committee might prohibit a competitor's entry if it deemed them to be too inexperienced. Entries were open from 1 July to 31 August. The FIA and the Macau Grand Prix Organizing Committee revealed the entry list on 25 October, which included five GT3 manufacturers (Audi, BMW, Ferrari, Mercedes-AMG and Porsche) and 21 drivers. (Note: GT3 car manufacturer Lamborghini was absent from the race because it was organising the Lamborghini World Finals in Italy that was held on the same weekend as the FIA GT World Cup and was focusing on its 2024 racing programme.) All five preceding FIA GT World Cup winners, Maro Engel, Augusto Farfus, Raffaele Marciello, Edoardo Mortara and Laurens Vanthoor, entered the race. Climax Racing's Mercedes-AMG GT3 Evo was withdrawn after unsuccessfully trying to assign Lucas Auer as its driver, lowering the number of entries to 20.

== Practice and qualifying ==
Two half an hour practice sessions were held on the afternoon of 16 November. Marciello, Christopher Haase and Matteo Cairoli competed for the fastest lap in the first session, with Marciello leading at 2:16.150 on his final fast lap. He was three-tenths of a second faster than Vanthoor in second, with Cairoli, Kévin Estre and Engel in third through fifth. There were no major incidents during the session. Marchy Lee temporarily stopped his Mercedes-Benz on the circuit at the start of practice before Daniel Serra's Ferrari 296 GT3 miscalculated the Melco hairpin on an out-lap, causing a car blockage that marshals cleared. Estre's Porsche suffered slight damage against the turn 15 barrier but continued with no apparent damage. The second practice session was delayed by half an hour owing to incidents during the Macau Grand Prix's first qualifying session, and lap times were quicker than the preceding session. Several drivers led the field before Cairoli lapped quickest overall at 2:15.532 late in the session. Marciello was 0.032 seconds slower in second, followed by Daniel Juncadella, Serra and Farfus. As with the first practice session, there were no major incidents or stoppages. On his final run, Engel overcorrected and drove into the run-off area at Lisboa corner, although his car was not damaged.

Friday afternoon's half-hour qualifying session determined the qualification race's starting order with each driver's fastest lap times. The weather was dry and windy for qualifying. Marciello, in his final race as a Mercedes factory driver before moving to BMW in 2024, reset his own GT3 track record of 2:14.542 on his last quick lap on an old set of tyres to secure his third successive FIA GT World Cup pole position. Marciello was joined on the front row by Mortara, who was 0.216 seconds slower but had provisional pole until Marciello's lap in the last seconds of qualifying. Engel was third, bringing two Mercedes-Benz drivers into the top three, which he attributed to winds and slightly higher tyre pressures. Vanthoor was the fastest of the seven Porsche drivers, taking fourth ahead of Sheldon van der Linde, the highest BMW driver, in fifth. Juncadella took sixth, ahead of Serra's fastest Ferrari in seventh place. Farfus, Earl Bamber and Hasse made up positions eight through ten. Cairoli was unable to maintain his previous pace because he lost momentum, qualifying 11th. Alessio Picariello qualified 12th, ahead of fellow Porsche brandmates Estre in 13th and Deutsche Tourenwagen Masters champion Thomas Preining in 14th. Ye Hongli was the top placed Silver-rated driver in 15th, followed by Adderly Fong in 16th. Jules Gounon was the slowest Platinum-rated participant in 17th, ahead of Cheng Congfu in 18th, Chen Weian in 19th and Lee completed the starting order in 20th. Some drivers ran off into the Lisboa turn run-off area during qualifying. Estre triggered the session's only stoppage when he misjudged his braking point and collided with the outside tyre barrier at Lisboa turn 12 minutes in, causing minor damage to his Porsche's left-front corner. Estre's car had to be removed from the barrier to continue driving. All cars returned to the paddock during the stoppage. Cairoli damaged his car's left front corner after leaving the circuit at Police turn, and Ye damaged the front of his car at Moorish Hill Corner five minutes before practice ended.

=== Qualifying classification ===
Final qualifying classification
| Pos. | Class | No. | Driver | Team | Manufacturer | Time | Gap |
|---|---|---|---|---|---|---|---|
| 1 | P | 48 | Raffaele Marciello (CHE) | (Germany) Mercedes-AMG Team Landgraf | Mercedes-Benz | 2:14.542 | – |
| 2 | P | 40 | Edoardo Mortara (CHE) | (China) Audi Sport Asia Team Absolute | Audi | 2:14.758 | +0.216 |
| 3 | P | 77 | Maro Engel (DEU) | (Hong Kong) Mercedes-AMG Team Craft-Bamboo Racing | Mercedes-Benz | 2:14.908 | +0.366 |
| 4 | P | 99 | Laurens Vanthoor (BEL) | (China) TORO Racing | Porsche | 2:15.045 | +0.503 |
| 5 | P | 32 | Sheldon van der Linde (ZAF) | (Belgium) Team WRT | BMW | 2:15.216 | +0.674 |
| 6 | P | 91 | Daniel Juncadella (ESP) | (Hong Kong) Mercedes-AMG Team Craft-Bamboo Racing | Mercedes-Benz | 2:15.232 | +0.690 |
| 7 | P | 51 | Daniel Serra (BRA) | (China) Harmony Racing | Ferrari | 2:15.254 | +0.712 |
| 8 | P | 11 | Augusto Farfus (BRA) | (Germany) ROWE Racing | BMW | 2:15.435 | +0.893 |
| 9 | P | 22 | Earl Bamber (NZL) | (Chinese Taipei) D2 Racing Team | Porsche | 2:15.491 | +0.949 |
| 10 | P | 41 | Christopher Haase (DEU) | (China) Audi Sport Asia Team Absolute | Audi | 2:15.593 | +1.051 |
| 11 | P | 120 | Matteo Cairoli (ITA) | (China) Absolute Racing | Porsche | 2:15.637 | +1.095 |
| 12 | G | 15 | Alessio Picariello (BEL) | (China) Luanzhou International Circuit | Porsche | 2:15.729 | +1.187 |
| 13 | P | 27 | Kévin Estre (FRA) | (Chinese Taipei) HubAuto Racing | Porsche | 2:15.743 | +1.201 |
| 14 | G | 28 | Thomas Preining (AUT) | (Chinese Taipei) HubAuto Racing | Porsche | 2:16.016 | +1.474 |
| 15 | S | 33 | Ye Hongli (CHN) | (China) R&B Racing | Porsche | 2:16.323 | +1.781 |
| 16 | S | 50 | Adderly Fong (HKG) | (China) Uno Racing Team | Audi | 2:16.433 | +1.891 |
| 17 | P | 2 | Jules Gounon (FRA) | (China) Climax Racing | Mercedes-Benz | 2:16.632 | +2.090 |
| 18 | S | 13 | Cheng Congfu (CHN) | (China) FAW Audi Racing Team | Audi | 2:16.820 | +2.278 |
| 19 | S | 52 | Chen Weian (CHN) | (China) Harmony Racing | Ferrari | 2:16.889 | +2.347 |
| 20 | S | 70 | Marchy Lee (HKG) | (China) TORO Racing | Mercedes-Benz | 2:20.623 | +6.081 |

Categorisation
| Icon | Class |
|---|---|
| P | Platinum |
| G | Gold |
| S | Silver |

== Qualification race ==
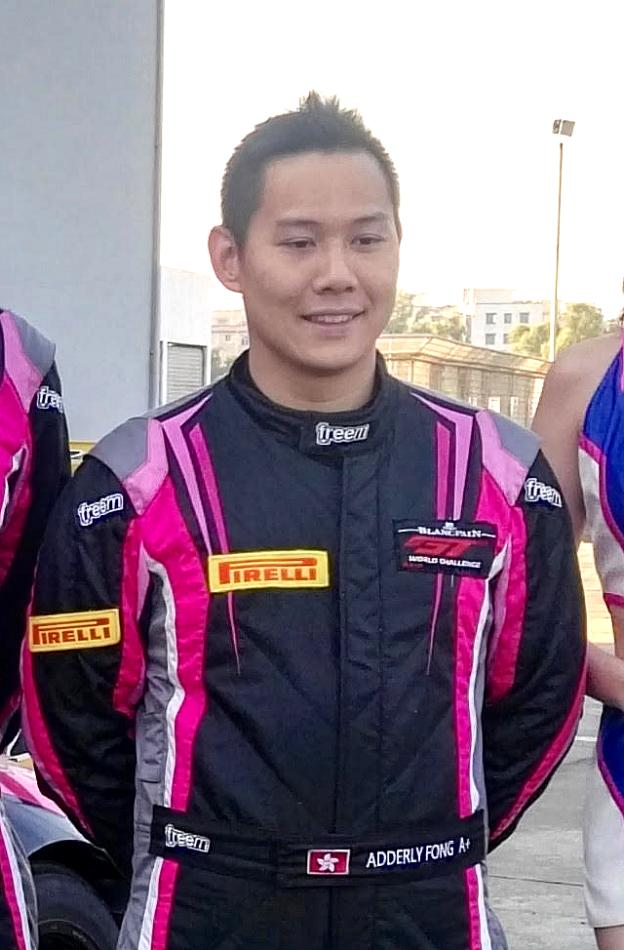
Adderly Fong (pictured in 2019) suffered a major accident in the qualification race that meant he was withdrawn from the main race.

The 12-lap qualifying race to set the main race's starting order commenced in an air temperature of 22 °C (72 °F) at 14:05 Macau Standard Time (UTC+08:00) on 18 November. Marciello made a quick start to lead the race into the first corner, while Mortara and Engel battled for second, with the latter overtaking on the outside through the high-speed Mandarin Oriental Bend turn. Vanthoor lost four positions on the first lap after being forced wide at Lisboa corner and hitting the barrier, while Juncadella moved from sixth to fourth. Preining collided with the guardrail barrier at the entry to San Francisco Bend corner due to driver error, while Cairoli stopped with heavy rear-end damage after colliding with Ye. The safety car was deployed for the first time for four laps to allow for the safe recovery of the crashed cars. Both drivers were unhurt, however Cairoli was transported to the medical centre for a headache. On lap five, Marciello retained the lead after fighting off Engel's attempts to pass him on the run to Lisboa turn. Juncadella tried to pass Mortara for third on the outside into Lisboa and was ahead of him into the turn. Mortara's position on the outside gave him an advantage and Juncadella was pushed into the outside tyre wall. Juncadella fell from fourth to ninth due to the incident, but he continued driving despite another impact with Farfus, removing his front-right side-view mirror. The first three drivers pulled away from the rest of the field.

On lap eight, Fong lost control of his car's rear in the Mandarin Oriental Bend turn due to a loss of some downforce from being affected by turbulence from a vehicle ahead of him. His car's left-rear wheel made minor contact with the inside wall leaving the turn, breaking the rear-left suspension's tie rod and sending him across the track. He struck the outside side barrier exiting the corner before ricocheting across the track. Although his Audi was heavily damaged, Fong was unhurt and quickly exited the car unaided. Fong did not need medical assistance. Race officials dispatched the safety car for the second time before stopping the race with a red flag on lap nine to allow marshals to clear the track of debris and repair the heavily damaged barrier. Every driver returned to the pit lane for the stoppage. The race resumed behind the safety car 23 minutes later, at 14:57 local time, and the drivers exited the pit lane behind the safety car. After one lap behind the safety car, the remaining 17 drivers resumed racing, with Marciello keeping the lead and holding off Engel into Lisboa corner. Van Der Linde passed Serra for fifth into Lisboa turn and regained control of his car despite missing his braking point. There were no change of positions on the final lap, and Maricello pulled away to lead the final two laps and win the qualification race and secure pole position for the main race. Engel finished 1.172 seconds behind in second and Mortara was third. Farfus, Van Der Linde, Serra, Vanthoor, Haase, Juncadella, Bamber, Picariello, Estre, Cheng, Chen, Gounon, Ye and Lee were the last of the finishers. Of the 20 starting drivers, 17 completed the race.

=== Qualification race classification ===
Final qualification race classification
| Pos. | Class | No. | Driver | Team | Car | Laps | Time/Retired |
|---|---|---|---|---|---|---|---|
| 1 | P | 48 | (Switzerland) Raffaele Marciello | (Germany) Mercedes-AMG Team Landgraf | Mercedes-AMG GT3 Evo | 12 | 56:05.030 |
| 2 | P | 77 | (Germany) Maro Engel | (Hong Kong) Mercedes-AMG Team Craft-Bamboo Racing | Mercedes-AMG GT3 Evo | 12 | +1.172 |
| 3 | P | 40 | (Switzerland) Edoardo Mortara | (China) Audi Sport Asia Team Absolute | Audi R8 LMS Evo II | 12 | +1.843 |
| 4 | P | 11 | (Brazil) Augusto Farfus | (Germany) ROWE Racing | BMW M4 GT3 | 12 | +3.355 |
| 5 | P | 32 | (South Africa) Sheldon van der Linde | (Belgium) Team WRT | BMW M4 GT3 | 12 | +3.944 |
| 6 | P | 51 | (Brazil) Daniel Serra | (China) Harmony Racing | Ferrari 296 GT3 | 12 | +5.367 |
| 7 | P | 99 | (Belgium) Laurens Vanthoor | (China) TORO Racing | Porsche 911 GT3 R (992) | 12 | +6.045 |
| 8 | P | 41 | (Germany) Christopher Haase | (China) Audi Sport Asia Team Absolute | Audi R8 LMS Evo II | 12 | +6.695 |
| 9 | P | 91 | (Spain) Daniel Juncadella | (Hong Kong) Mercedes-AMG Team Craft-Bamboo Racing | Mercedes-AMG GT3 Evo | 12 | +7.263 |
| 10 | P | 22 | (New Zealand) Earl Bamber | (Chinese Taipei) D2 Racing Team | Porsche 911 GT3 R (992) | 12 | +8.664 |
| 11 | G | 15 | (Belgium) Alessio Picariello | (China) Luanzhou International Circuit | Porsche 911 GT3 R (992) | 12 | +9.016 |
| 12 | P | 27 | (France) Kévin Estre | (Chinese Taipei) HubAuto Racing | Porsche 911 GT3 R (992) | 12 | +9.586 |
| 13 | S | 13 | (China) Cheng Congfu | (China) FAW Audi Racing Team | Audi R8 LMS Evo II | 12 | +12.338 |
| 14 | S | 52 | (China) Chen Weian | (China) Harmony Racing | Ferrari 488 GT3 Evo 2020 | 12 | +12.846 |
| 15 | P | 2 | (France) Jules Gounon | (China) Climax Racing | Mercedes-AMG GT3 Evo | 12 | +17.243 |
| 16 | S | 33 | (China) Ye Hongli | (China) R&B Racing | Porsche 911 GT3 R (992) | 12 | +20.636^{1} |
| 17 | S | 70 | (Hong Kong) Marchy Lee | (China) TORO Racing | Mercedes-AMG GT3 Evo | 12 | +28.379 |
| Ret | S | 50 | (Hong Kong) Adderly Fong | (China) Uno Racing Team | Audi R8 LMS Evo II | 7 | +5 laps |
| NC | P | 120 | (Italy) Matteo Cairoli | (China) Absolute Racing | Porsche 911 GT3 R (992) | 0 | Accident |
| NC | G | 28 | (Austria) Thomas Preining | (Chinese Taipei) HubAuto Racing | Porsche 911 GT3 R (992) | 0 | Accident |

Notes:

- ^1 — Ye Hongli incurred a ten-second time penalty for colliding with Matteo Cairoli on the first lap and was demoted from 13th to 16th.

== Main race ==
The 16-lap main race began in dry weather conditions of 22 °C (72 °F) at 12:05 local time. Uno Racing Team inspected and withdrew Fong's car owing to chassis damage sustained in the incident in the previous day's qualification race, lowering the number of starting cars to 19. Marciello accelerated from the rolling start to maintain the lead into the first corner, and after defending against Engel, he pulled away on the drive to Lisboa turn. Van Der Linde moved from sixth to fourth while his brandmate Farfus fell from fourth to sixth on lap one. On the following lap, Van Der Linde slipstreamed behind Mortara's car by using his BMW's higher top speed but could not pass him. Engel began suffering from a broken paddle shifter on lap four but the problem exacerbated after examining the cables and connections between the dashboard and the steering wheel. Mortara occasionally closed up to the back of Engel's car, as Van Der Linde applied pressure. On lap eight, Estre collided with the side of Bamber's Porsche at Lisboa turn, damaging his rear diffuser with subsequent contact while contending for tenth. Soon after, Chen made a driver error and crashed into the tyre barrier at the same point, leading race control to deploy the safety car for a single lap because the track was partially blocked.

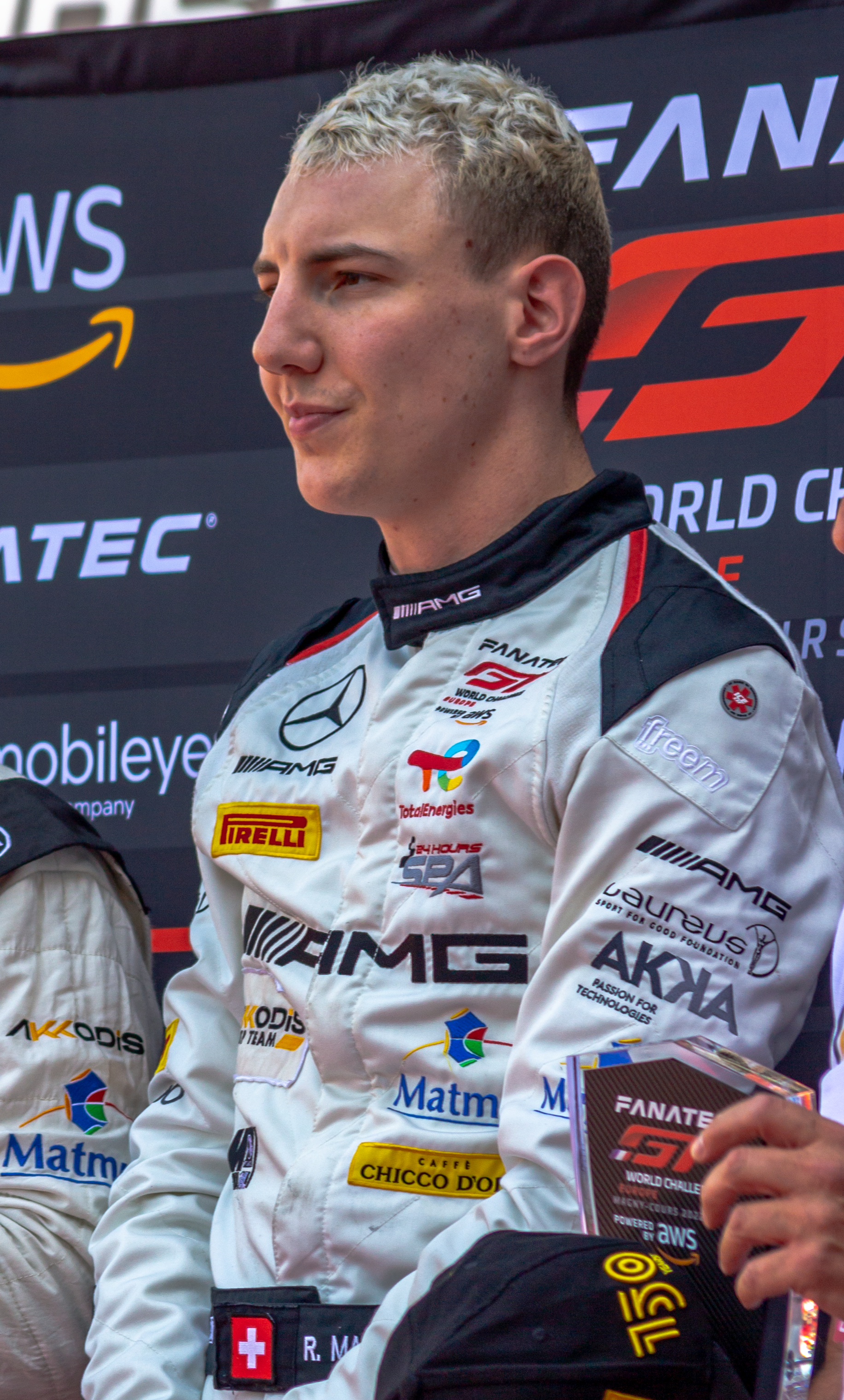
Raffaele Marciello (pictured in 2022) led every lap of both the qualification and main races to become the race's first repeat winner.

Marciello raced away from the field on the lap ten restart after Engel was unable to select second gear owing to a full failure of his paddle shifter and could not drive at full speed. All other drivers were delayed as series regulations banned overtaking before the start/finish line immediately after the safety car's withdrawal. Engel dropped to 18th and drove slowly to the pit lane to retire his car, indirectly because of the safety car period. This promoted Mortara to second and Van Der Linde to third, with Marciello holding a 2.7-second lead. Attention focused on Mortara and Van Der Linde in the battle for second, until the latter made an unscheduled pit stop on lap 11 to replace a left-rear tyre puncture that was caused by on-track debris. Van Der Linde rejoined the track at the back of the field, moving his brandmate Farfus to third, who had overtaken Serra at the restart. On the penultimate lap, Estre collided with the barrier at Fisherman's Bend, removing his rear fender and dropping him from ninth to twelfth.

There were no more overtakes, as Marciello led every lap of the race weekend to clinch his second consecutive FIA GT World Cup victory following his first in 2019 and became the event's first repeat winner since it was first held in 2015. Mortara lagged behind the BMWs and Mercedes-AMGs in terms of acceleration and top speed on the long straights, finishing second 2.51 seconds later. Farfus finished third on the podium, ensuring that three different manufacturers were in the first three places. Serra was the highest-finishing rookie driver in fourth. Juncadella moved from ninth to fifth, ahead of Porsche's best-placed driver Vanthoor in sixth and Hasse was seventh. Picariello took eighth, Bamber came ninth and Ye was the highest-placed silver-ranked entrant in tenth and earned the Silver Cup. Cairoli, Estre, Cheng, Gounon, Preining, Van Der Linde and Lee were the final finishers.

=== Main Race classification ===
Final classification of the main race
| Pos. | Class | No. | Driver | Team | Car | Laps | Time/Retired |
|---|---|---|---|---|---|---|---|
| 1 | P | 48 | (Switzerland) Raffaele Marciello | (Germany) Mercedes-AMG Team Landgraf | Mercedes-AMG GT3 Evo | 16 | 38:35.554 |
| 2 | P | 40 | (Switzerland) Edoardo Mortara | (China) Audi Sport Asia Team Absolute | Audi R8 LMS Evo II | 16 | +2.510 |
| 3 | P | 11 | (Brazil) Augusto Farfus | (Germany) ROWE Racing | BMW M4 GT3 | 16 | +4.295 |
| 4 | P | 51 | (Brazil) Daniel Serra | (China) Harmony Racing | Ferrari 296 GT3 | 16 | +6.018 |
| 5 | P | 91 | (Spain) Daniel Juncadella | (Hong Kong) Mercedes-AMG Team Craft-Bamboo Racing | Mercedes-AMG GT3 Evo | 16 | +6.515 |
| 6 | P | 99 | (Belgium) Laurens Vanthoor | (China) TORO Racing | Porsche 911 GT3 R (992) | 16 | +7.796 |
| 7 | P | 41 | (Germany) Christopher Haase | (China) Audi Sport Asia Team Absolute | Audi R8 LMS Evo II | 16 | +8.377 |
| 8 | G | 15 | (Belgium) Alessio Picariello | (China) Luanzhou International Circuit | Porsche 911 GT3 R (992) | 16 | +8.936 |
| 9 | P | 22 | (New Zealand) Earl Bamber | (Chinese Taipei) D2 Racing Team | Porsche 911 GT3 R (992) | 16 | +13.172 |
| 10 | S | 33 | (China) Ye Hongli | (China) R&B Racing | Porsche 911 GT3 R (992) | 16 | +13.935 |
| 11 | P | 120 | (Italy) Matteo Cairoli | (China) Absolute Racing | Porsche 911 GT3 R (992) | 16 | +14.805 |
| 12 | P | 27 | (France) Kévin Estre | (Chinese Taipei) HubAuto Racing | Porsche 911 GT3 R (992) | 16 | +16.285 |
| 13 | S | 13 | (China) Cheng Congfu | (China) FAW Audi Racing Team | Audi R8 LMS Evo II | 16 | +19.826 |
| 14 | P | 2 | (France) Jules Gounon | (China) Climax Racing | Mercedes-AMG GT3 Evo | 16 | +32.454 |
| 15 | G | 28 | (Austria) Thomas Preining | (Chinese Taipei) HubAuto Racing | Porsche 911 GT3 R (992) | 16 | +59.148 |
| 16 | P | 32 | (South Africa) Sheldon van der Linde | (Belgium) Team WRT | BMW M4 GT3 | 16 | +59.287 |
| 17 | S | 70 | (Hong Kong) Marchy Lee | (China) TORO Racing | Mercedes-AMG GT3 Evo | 16 | +1:05.775 |
| Ret | P | 77 | (Germany) Maro Engel | (Hong Kong) Mercedes-AMG Team Craft-Bamboo Racing | Mercedes-AMG GT3 Evo | 10 | Gearbox |
| Ret | S | 52 | (China) Chen Weian | (China) Harmony Racing | Ferrari 488 GT3 Evo 2020 | 7 | Retired |

== See also ==
- 2023 Macau Grand Prix
