= Raffaele Marciello =

Swiss-born Italian racing driver (born 1994)

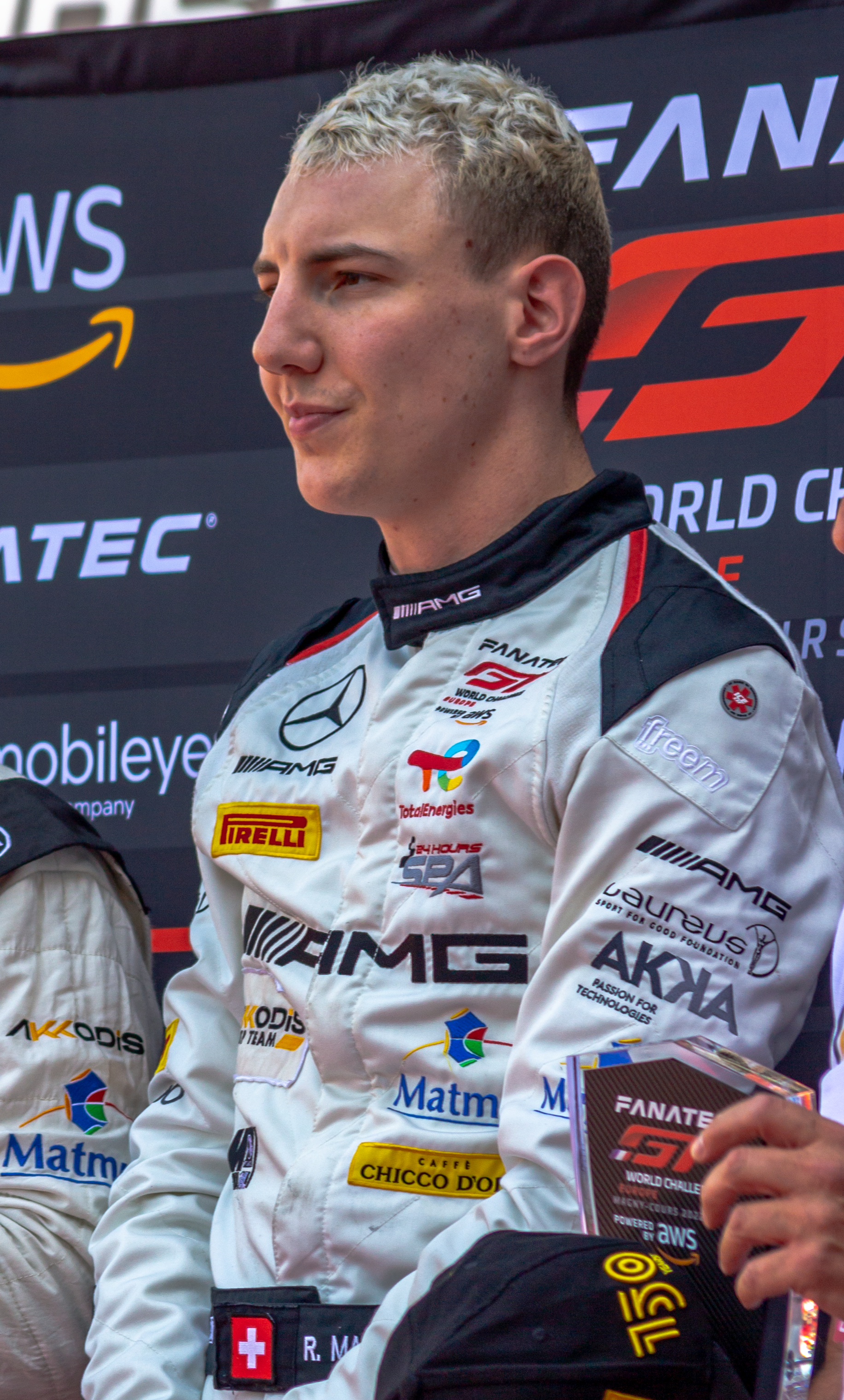
- Marciello in 2022
- Nationality: (Switzerland) Swiss (Italy) Italian (Note: Marciello, a dual citizen, competed under an Italian racing licence earlier in his career. Since 2022, he represents Switzerland.)
- Born: 17 December 1994 (age 31) Zürich, Switzerland

FIA World Endurance Championship career
- Debut season: 2024
- Current team: BMW M Team WRT
- Categorisation: FIA Platinum
- Car number: 15
- Starts: 24 (24 entries)
- Wins: 1
- Podiums: 0
- Poles: 1
- Fastest laps: 0
- Best finish: 3rd in 2026

Previous series
- 2017–2023 2017–2023 2014–2016 2012–2013 2012 2012 2011 2010: GTWC Europe Endurance Cup; GTWC Europe Sprint Cup; GP2 Series; FIA European F3 Championship; Formula 3 Euro Series; Toyota Racing Series; Italian Formula Three; Formula Abarth

Championship titles
- 2018, 2022–2023 2022–2023 2022 2018 2013: GT World Challenge Europe; GTWC Europe Endurance Cup; ADAC GT Masters; Blancpain GT Series Sprint Cup; FIA F3 European Championship

Raffaele "Lello" Marciello (Italian pronunciation: [raffaˈɛːle marˈtʃɛllo]; born 17 December 1994) is a Swiss and Italian professional racing driver who currently competes in the FIA World Endurance Championship for BMW M Team WRT and the GT World Challenge Europe Endurance Cup for Rowe Racing.

Noted for his tall height, Marciello was FIA Formula 3 European champion in 2013, won in the GP2 Series and tested for Ferrari and Sauber in Formula One. He switched to GT racing in 2017 and soon became a Mercedes-AMG works driver, winning the GT World Challenge Europe (2018, 2022, 2023), the FIA GT World Cup (2019, 2023), the ADAC GT Masters (2022) and the Spa 24 Hours (2022). After joining BMW for 2024, Marciello made his LMDh debut in the FIA World Endurance Championship and won the Nürburgring 24 Hours (2025).

== Early career ==
=== Karting ===
Marciello debuted in karting in 2005 and raced in various European championships, working his way up from the junior ranks to progress through to the KF2 category by 2010.

=== Formula Abarth ===
In 2010, Marciello graduated to single-seaters, racing in the newly launched Formula Abarth series in Italy for JD Motorsport. He won opening race at Misano and race at Varano and amassed another two podiums it brought him third place in standings. He and fellow Formula Abarth champion Brandon Maïsano also became members of the Ferrari Driver Academy.

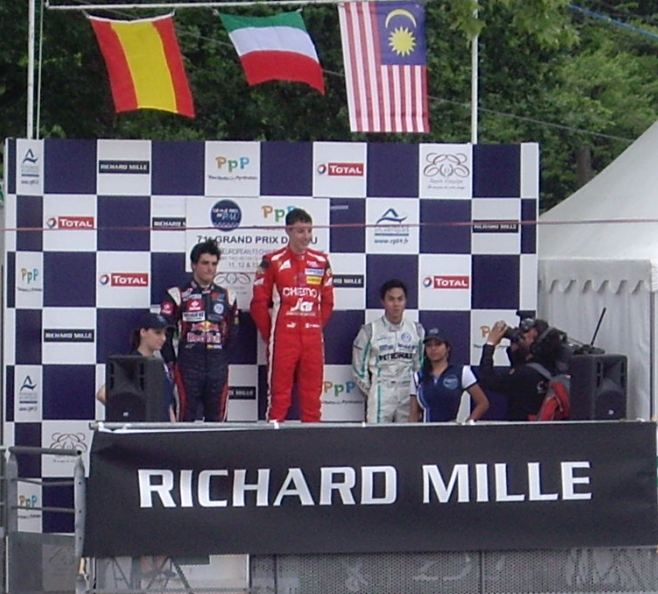
Marciello (center) after winning the 2012 Pau Grand Prix

=== Formula Three ===
Marciello stepped up to Italian Formula Three Championship in 2011 and joined Prema Powerteam. He claimed wins at Misano and Adria and another four podiums, finishing third and losing rookie title to Michael Lewis, but overcoming Maïsano by seven points.

In 2012 Marciello continued his collaboration with Prema Powerteam into Formula 3 Euro Series. and the revived FIA European Formula Three Championship. In FIA F3, he finished second in the championship, with nine podiums including seven wins. In Euro Series, he finished third with ten podiums and six wins. In both championships, he scored more wins than anybody else.

Marciello remained in F3 for 2013, and emerged as a pre-season favourite following his impressive results in the previous year and dominant performances in pre-season testing. He ended up winning 13 races and claimed the title with a race to spare.

=== Toyota Racing Series ===
During the 2012 off-season, Marciello competed in New Zealand-based Toyota Racing Series, taking ninth place in the championship with a win at Hampton Downs.

=== GP2 Series ===
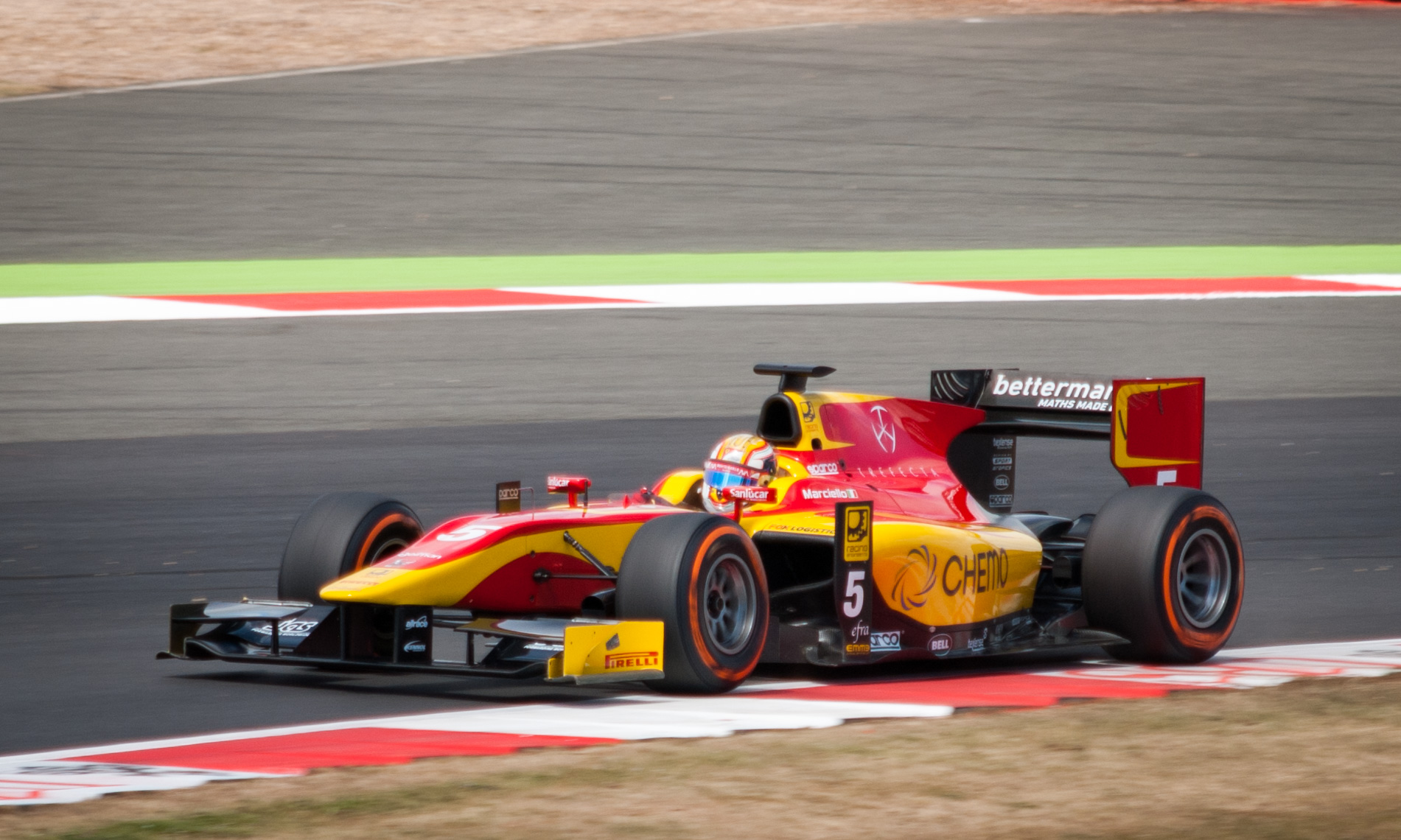
Marciello took his only GP2 pole position at Silverstone in 2014.

Marciello had been looking to be driving in the GP2 Series or World Series by Renault for 2014 after testing both cars in Catalunya in October 2013.

On 20 January 2014, the Ferrari Driver Academy announced Marciello would be racing in GP2 in 2014. However, they did not confirm the team he would be competing with. On 18 February, it was announced he would be driving for the Racing Engineering team. Marciello achieved his first GP2 victory in a wet feature race at Spa-Francorchamps after an intense fight with Stoffel Vandoorne in the closing stages. Multiple errors and incidents plagued Marciello's season, as he only finished in the points on six occasions, but his win and three further podiums took him to eighth in the standings.

Going into the 2015 season, Marciello joined Trident Racing. Though he only qualified outside of the top ten once, Marciello took the same amount of podiums as in his rookie season and finished seventh overall. Nevertheless, he scored 99.1% of the team's points.

Marciello raced with Russian Time in the 2016 season. In a season dominated by Prema Racing, Marciello finished fourth in the standings thanks to consistent performances which yielded six podiums.

=== Formula One ===
On 26 November 2014, Marciello made his Formula One debut behind the wheel of the Ferrari F14 T, during that day's post-season test at the Yas Marina Circuit. He set the second fastest time of the session, half a second adrift of Pascal Wehrlein in the Mercedes F1 W05 Hybrid.

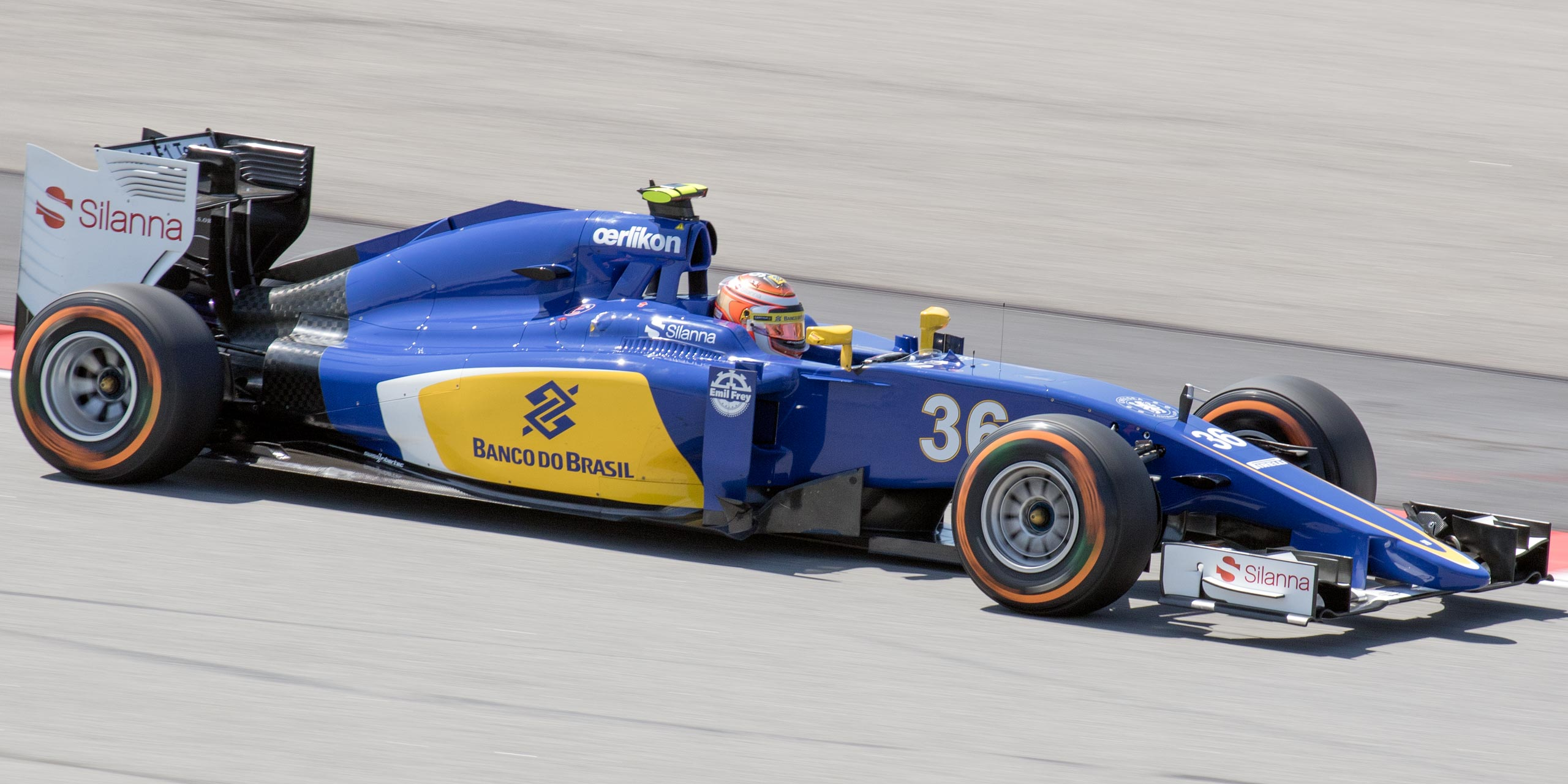
Marciello during free practice for the 2015 Malaysian Grand Prix

On 31 December 2014, it was announced that Marciello had signed as test and reserve driver for the Sauber Formula One team for 2015. In January 2016, it was announced that Marciello had been dropped by Sauber and had split with the Ferrari Driver Academy for personal reasons.

== Sportscar career ==
=== 2017: First step into GT racing ===
In 2017, Marciello ventured into the sportscar racing scene, driving a Mercedes-AMG GT3 for AKKA ASP in the Blancpain GT Series Endurance Cup and Blancpain GT Series Sprint Cup. The Italian impressed in his debut year, scoring two podiums in the Sprint and Endurance cups respectively. His highlight however came at the 24 Hours of Spa, where, having qualified on pole alongside teammates Edoardo Mortara and Michael Meadows, Marciello used up the maximum allowed driving time of 14 hours to help his team to finish third.

=== 2018: Mercedes factory driver ===
Ahead of the 2018 season, Mercedes-AMG added Marciello to their rank of Performance drivers, thus making him a fully-fledged factory driver. The season saw him returning to both the Endurance Cup and Sprint Cup series where, once again with AKKA ASP, he paired up with Meadows in the latter and drove alongside Tristan Vautier and Daniel Juncadella in the former. Marciello performed to a high level, taking second-placed finishes in the Endurance rounds at Silverstone and - after initially being awarded victory when a suspected technical non-compliance for the winning team caused them to be provisionally disqualified - Barcelona, which led him to a runner-up spot in the Endurance Cup. Having inherited the title at first, an appeal by the disqualified team stripped the accolade from Marciello, with the disqualification being converted into a fine. Meanwhile, wins at Budapest and the season finale at the Nürburgring alongside a slew of further podiums gave Marciello and Meadows the Sprint Cup title.

That year, Marciello also partook in all four rounds of the Intercontinental GT Challenge with Mercedes. He scored podiums at Bathurst and Spa, as well as taking a win at the Suzuka 10 Hours, the latter earning him the provisional championship lead, though a seventh place at Laguna Seca, a race in which Marciello damaged his car and received a drive-through penalty after a mistimed move on the WRT Audi of Sheldon van der Linde, set him back to third in the standings.

=== 2019: Maiden Macau crown ===
Continuing into a third season of the Endurance and Sprint series at AKKA ASP, Marciello would be partnered by Vincent Abril in both championships, with the pair being joined by Michael Meadows for the endurance rounds. In the Sprint Cup, Marciello was unable to defend his title, even if a win at Zandvoort and a pair of victories at the season finale in Hungary earned him and Abril third in the championship, one the pair battled for until the final race of the season. As well as this, the final victory at the Hungaroring guaranteed AKKA ASP the teams' title. Their campaign in the Endurance Cup proved less fortunate, as retirements in two races saw the Italian end up 25th overall.

Marciello took part in the FIA GT World Cup, held at the prestigious Guia Circuit in Macau, at the end of the year with Team GruppeM. Having taken pole position for the event the previous year, the Italian repeated said feat in 2019, before proceeding to control Saturday's qualification race and winning the main race, therefore becoming the GT World Cup winner for the first time.

=== 2020: ADAC GT Masters debut ===
Despite a truncated year due to the outbreak of the COVID-19 pandemic, Mercedes would expand Marciello's full-time racing duties, with him not only driving for AKKA in the rebranded GT World Challenge Europe Endurance and Sprint cups, but also taking part in the ADAC GT Masters alongside Philip Ellis. That campaign proved to be largely anonymous, say for the final race at Oschersleben, where Marciello and Ellis took victory from pole position.

His campaign in the Endurance Cup would see more success than the previous year: partnering Felipe Fraga and silver-ranked Timur Boguslavskiy, Marciello and his team ended up fifth in the standings, having taken a pair of podiums at the start of the year before encountering brake issues at the 24 Hours of Spa which ended their championship challenge. In the Sprint Cup, Marciello helped Boguslavskiy towards wins at Misano and Barcelona, though he would finish third in the drivers' standings - one place behind the Russian, who himself ended up mere four points behind the title-winning duo of Dries Vanthoor and Charles Weerts - as he missed the round at Zandvoort due to his commitments at the 24 Hours of Nürburgring.

=== 2021: Further victories in GTM and GTWC ===
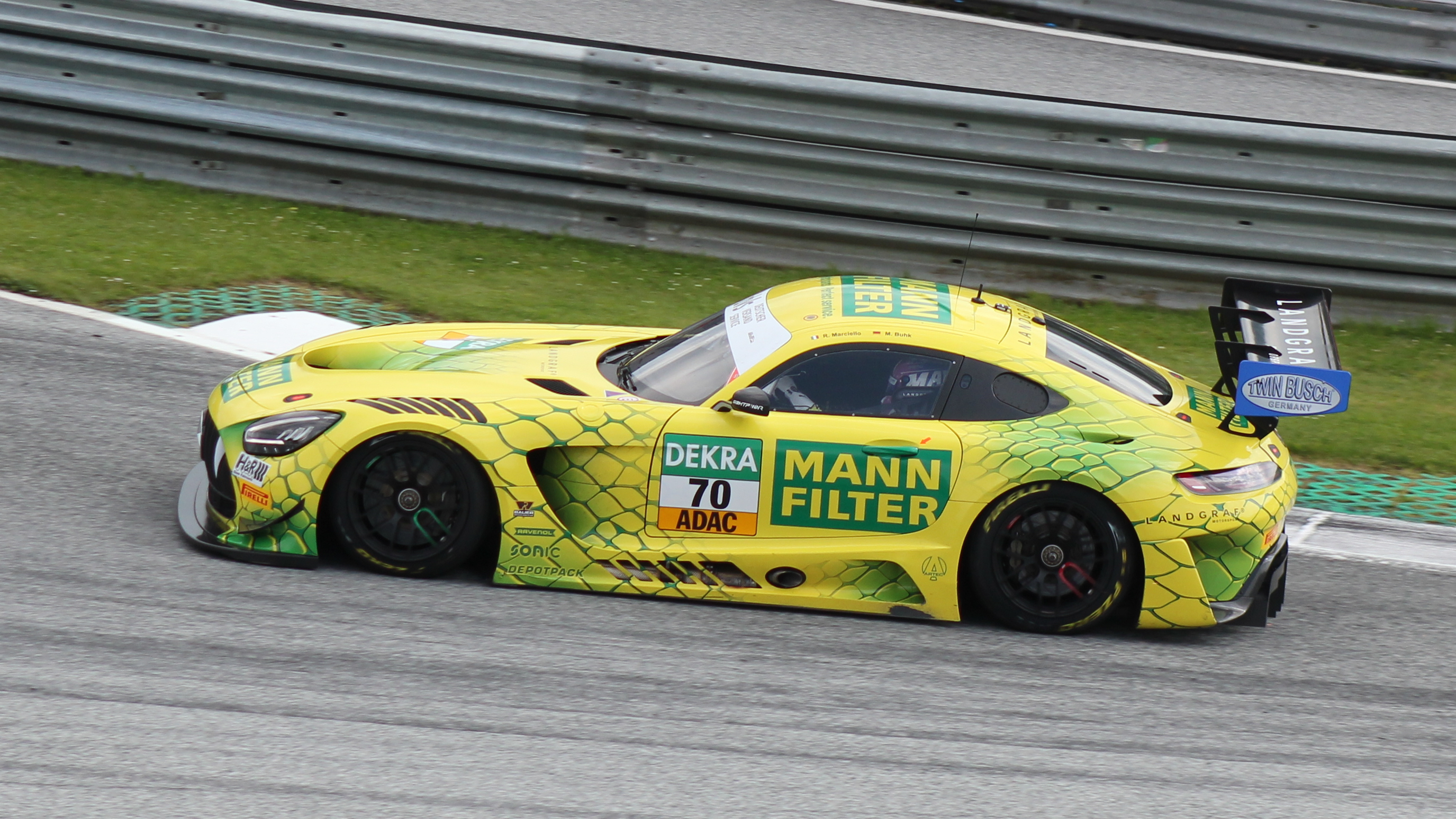
Marciello competing at the Red Bull Ring during the 2021 ADAC GT Masters season.

Marciello remained in the ADAC GT Masters for 2021, this time driving at Mann-Filter Team Landgraf-HTP WWR together with Maximilian Buhk. The season began promisingly, as the duo converted pole to victory at the season opener in Oschersleben in a commanding performance. The team would score two further podiums during the first eight races of the season, which was enough to close the gap to just three points compared to the leading Land-Motorsport outfit of Ricardo Feller and Christopher Mies. However, a retirement at the Sachsenring owing to a crash caused by Albert Costa and a 30-second penalty which led to a finish outside of the points in Hockenheim put the title out of reach for Marciello and Buhk, who ended the season fourth overall.

Marciello also drove for the AKKA ASP Team in the SRO competitions, being joined by new Mercedes factory driver Jules Gounon on a full-time basis in the Endurance Cup and once again partnering Timur Boguslavskiy in the Sprint Cup. In the former series, Marciello and Gounon were able to mount a title charge, taking second places at Monza, a race which Marciello led during the opening stint, and at the Nürburgring, where the team ran in second for the majority of the contest. Additionally, Marciello scored a second successive pole position for the 24 Hours of Spa, though the team would retire due to damper failure. The points they lost in Belgium cost the outfit during the final round in Barcelona, where, despite taking victory alongside Felipe Fraga, Marciello and Gounon would miss out on the championship by four points. In the Sprint Cup, Marciello and Boguslavskiy scored four podiums but failed to win a race, leading to a third-placed finish in the drivers' standings.

Near the end of the year, Marciello confirmed that he would be switching to a Swiss racing licence from 2022 onwards, citing a lack of support from the governing body of Italian motorsport as the reason for his "overdue" switch.

=== 2022: GTM and Endurance Cup titles ===
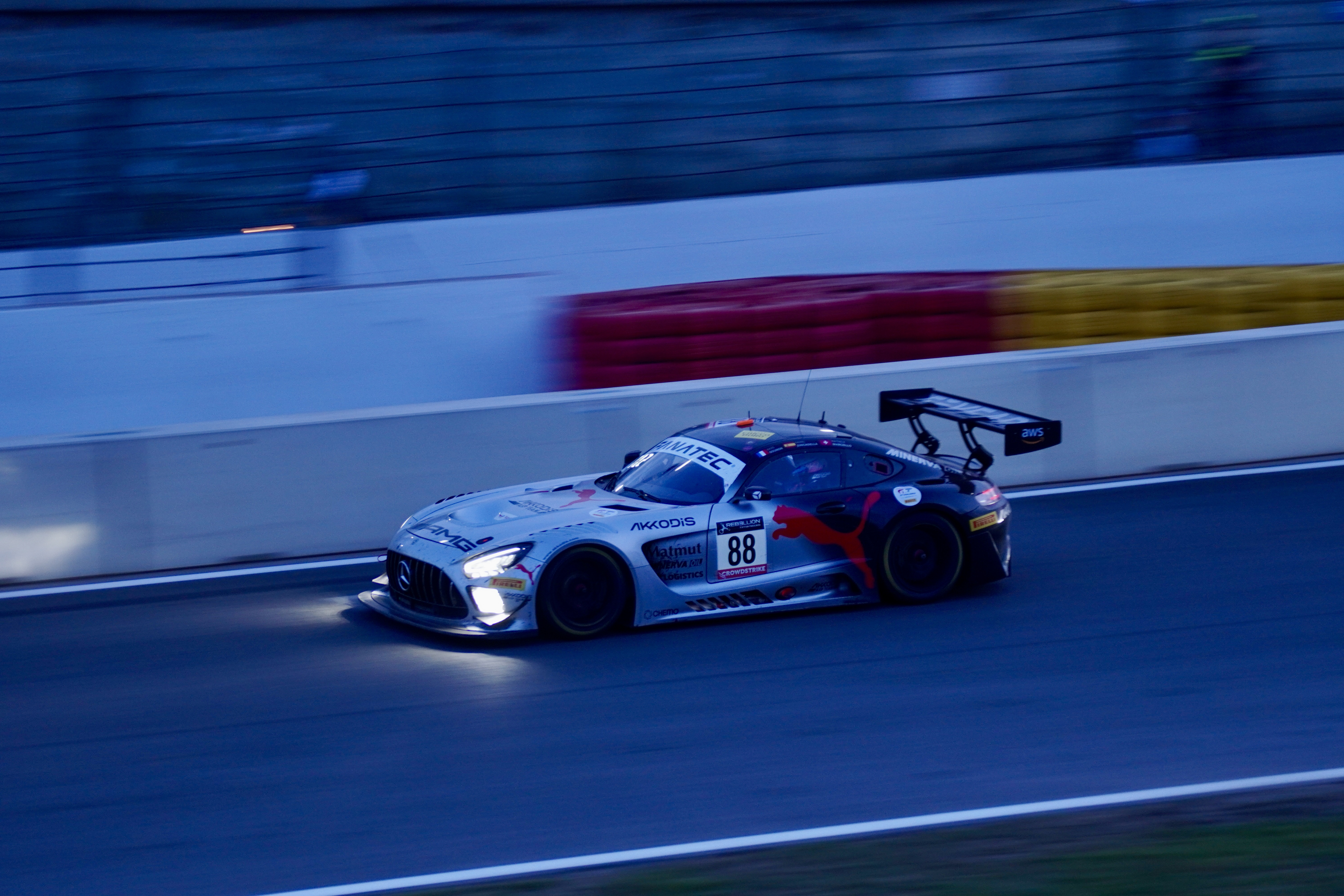
The Mercedes-AMG GT3 Evo driven by Jules Gounon, Daniel Juncadella and Raffaele Marciello that won the 2022 24 Hours of Spa

Team Landgraf and Marciello were reunited for the 2022 ADAC GT Masters season, with a variety of teammates accompanying the Italian across the season. A double podium to start the year off was swiftly followed by Marciello's first pole at the Red Bull Ring, one which he converted to third place in the race. Following that round, teammate Jonathan Aberdein was replaced by Lorenzo Ferrari, with personal issues between Marciello and the South African and a lack of pace from the latter being the speculated reasons for said decision. A disappointing event in Zandvoort was the result, though Marciello would bounce back at the Nürburgring, winning the opening race and finishing second on Sunday alongside fellow factory driver Maro Engel and taking the championship lead in the process. The Swiss driver was joined by Daniel Juncadella, another factory driver of the German brand, for the remaining three rounds, where he took three further podiums as well as two pole positions, which enabled him to clinch the title one race early at the Hockenheimring.

In addition, another double campaign at AKKodis ASP in the Endurance and Sprint cups was in store for Marciello. Once again, he was joined by Boguslavskiy in the Sprint Cup, where wins at Brands Hatch, Magny-Cours and Zandvoort, along with a heap of fastest laps and pole positions on Marciello's part, enabled the pair to fight for the title, though they would lose out for a third successive year to the WRT duo of Vanthoor and Weerts. Despite this, Marciello managed to clinch the overall GT World Challenge Europe title at the final Sprint Cup round. This was compounded by a notable season in the Endurance Cup: having earned top honours at the 24 Hours of Spa, the trio of Marciello, Jules Gounon and Daniel Juncadella ended up winning the championship at the season finale in Barcelona, beating Ferrari's Antonio Fuoco by two points.

=== 2023: Final triumphs with Mercedes ===
At the start of 2023, Marciello drove for GetSpeed Performance in the Asian Le Mans Series. Having scored a pair of podiums during the first event in Dubai, he, Fabian Schiller, and Florian Scholze ended up third in the GT championship. He also made his prototype debut during the 24 Hours of Daytona, where he drove an Oreca 07 for High Class Racing.

Marciello's main campaigns would, once more, lie in the European SRO competitions, as he remained with Boguslavskiy in the Sprint Cup and joined him and Gounon for a title defence in the Endurance Cup. The Endurance Cup season opener at Monza ended with retirement, with Boguslavskiy causing race-ending damage with a misjudged defensive move, though the team bounced back with a victory at Le Castellet, where Marciello charged through the field during the final hours to take victory. A second place at the 24 Hours of Spa was followed by a win from pole position at the Nürburgring. The gap the team had amassed meant that a fifth-placed finish at Barcelona was enough to clinch back-to-back titles for Marciello and Gounon.

Marciello was able to stamp his mark on the Sprint Cup campaign as well, which started with a victory apiece at Brands Hatch and Misano, with dominant opening stints from Marciello being the catalysts for success. The duo retired during the first race at Hockenheim, but would bounce back to win on Sunday in spite of gear-shifting issues which manifested during Boguslavskiy's stint. Another pole position truncated by an imposing first stint from Marciello earned AKKodis victory in Valencia, though this would not be enough to take home the Sprint Cup title, with a collision caused by Audi's Lorenzo Patrese ending the team's final race at Zandvoort, therefore crowning the Tresor Orange1 outfit as champions.

Parallel to his GTWC commitments, Marciello partnered John Ferguson in the British GT Championship. With a win at Snetterton, Marciello and Ferguson helped Ram Racing to fourth place in the teams' standings.

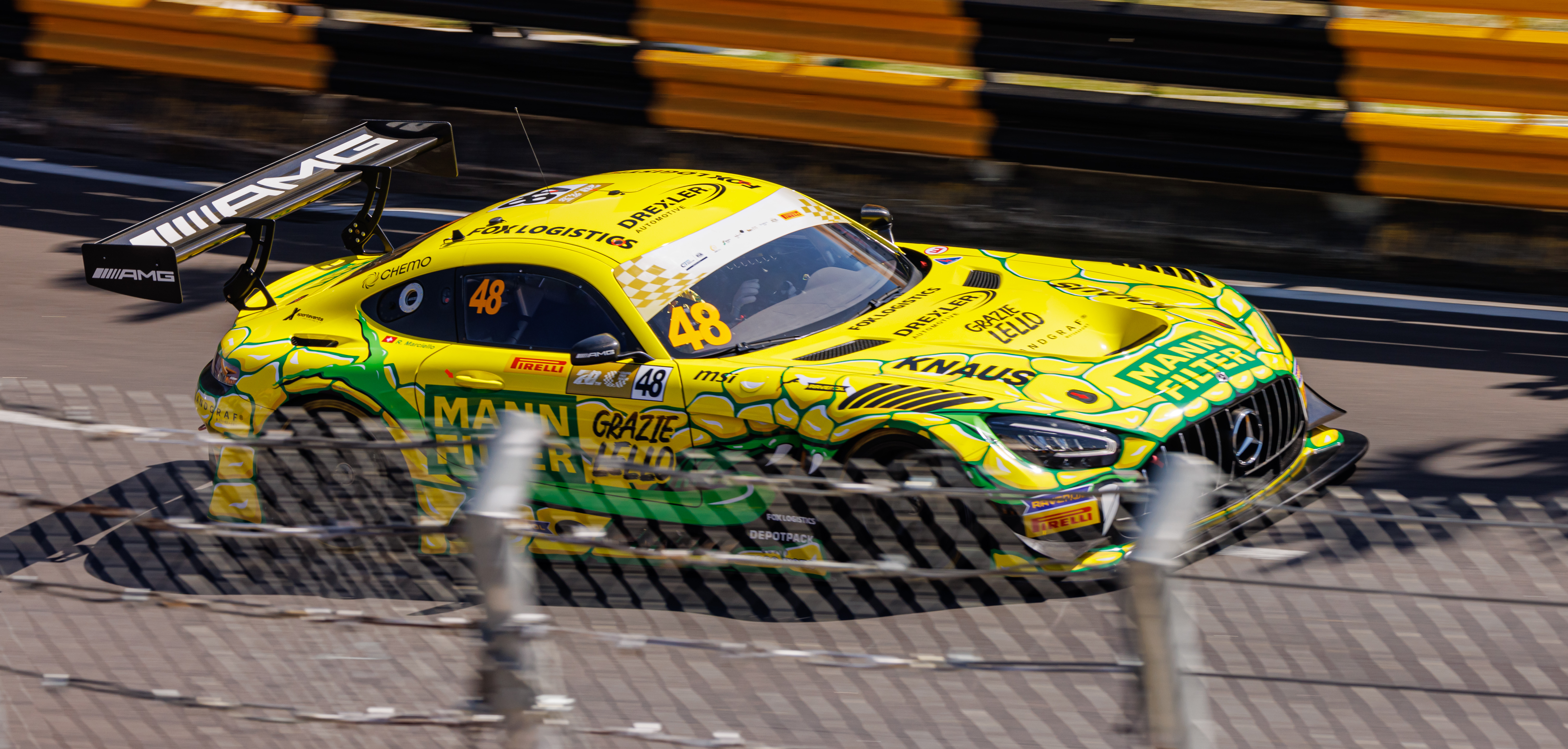
Marciello at the 2023 FIA GT World Cup

In November 2023, Marciello would drive his final race as a Mercedes-AMG factory driver, competing at the FIA GT World Cup in Macau with Team Landgraf. A dominant weekend followed, as Marciello took pole, won the qualifying race on Saturday and clinched world cup honours with a faultless drive on Sunday. With his departure imminent, Marciello presented his Macau victory as a "last gift" to the Mercedes brand he had been a part of for the previous seven years.

=== 2024: Switch to BMW, Hypercar step-up ===
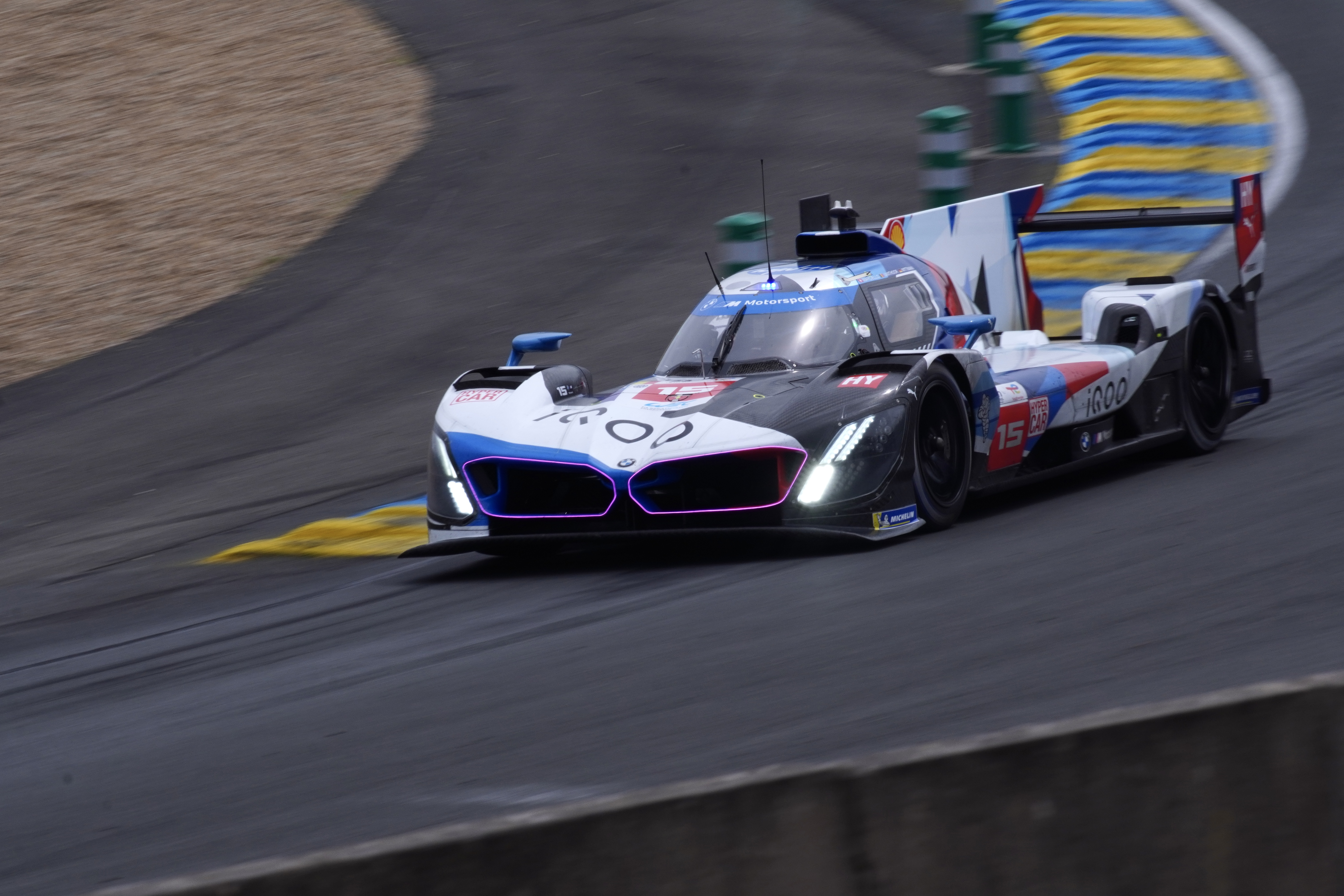
BMW M Hybrid V8 #15 during practice at the 2024 24 Hours of Le Mans

The week after his Macau triumph, Marciello announced that he would be joining BMW as a factory driver. In January 2024, he was announced to be making his debut in the FIA World Endurance Championship in the top-flight Hypercar class, driving for factory-backed Team WRT in a BMW M Hybrid V8 alongside Dries Vanthoor and Marco Wittmann. He also joined bronze-ranked John Ferguson at RAM Racing in the British GT Championship and drove together with Maxime Martin and Valentino Rossi in the GTWCE Endurance Cup. Marciello made his first appearance at the wheel of a BMW M4 GT3 at the 2024 Bathurst 12 Hours alongside the aforementioned pair, finishing fifth.

Marciello's hypercar season yielded mostly muted results. Having failed to score points in the first half of the year, the No. 15 BMW crew finished ninth at São Paulo and eighth in Austin. A strong drive in Fuji then earned the team second place — despite Marciello colliding with Earl Bamber during the third hour —, BMW's first top-class podium in the WEC. Marciello and his teammates capped off the season with fifth in Bahrain, majorly contributing to BMW finishing fifth in the manufacturers' standings.

In British GT, Marciello's season highlight proved a GT3 lap record at Spa-Francorchamps. He left the series after completing just five races and finished 14th in the drivers' standings. In the Endurance Cup meanwhile, Marciello, Martin, and Rossi finished three of the five races in the top five but failed to score at Spa and the Nürburgring, leaving them ninth overall. Marciello performed strongly in the FIA GT World Cup at Macau, qualifying on pole and winning the qualifying race. During the main race however, a furious battle for the lead between Marciello and Antonio Fuoco concluded with both drivers overshooting the Lisboa turn with three laps to go; Marciello finished 18th, one lap down. Both drivers blamed each other for the incident, with Marciello suggesting that Fuoco had moved under braking, whereas Fuoco claimed that Marciello had missed his braking point and therefore hit the rear of Fuoco's Ferrari.

=== 2025: Nürburgring 24 Hour honours ===
Marciello continued driving for BMW and WRT in the 2025 FIA World Endurance Championship, this time being joined by Vanthoor and Kevin Magnussen. He also partnered Augusto Farfus and Jesse Krohn at ROWE Racing in the GTWCE Endurance Cup. After finishing fourth overall in a one-off at the 24 Hours of Daytona, Marciello took second at the Bathurst 12 Hours in a WRT one-two finish. This strong form continued into the first WEC round in Qatar, where Marciello and his teammates finished fourth. They then placed sixth in Imola and tenth in Spa, where Marciello received a drive-through penalty for speeding in the pit lane. A hybrid system cooling issue caused the No. 15 to finish multiple laps down at Le Mans. This set the tone for the team's fortunes, as the No. 15 failed to score points in the remaining four races. This included an accident for Marciello on his outlap at Fuji, caused by him swerving to avoid the suddenly slowing No. 99 Proton Porsche of Nico Pino. BMW still finished fifth in the manufracturers' standings, though Marciello and his teammates ended up behind the sister No. 20 in the drivers' championship.

The GT3 campaign saw Marciello achieve a number of standout results. In the Endurance Cup, a commanding victory at the Nürburgring and third place at Barcelona propelled Marciello and ROWE Racing to fourth in the standings. Marciello also made a one-off start in the Sprint Cup at Misano, winning race 1 with a late overtake on Vincent Abril. The year's highlight came at the 24 Hours of Nürburgring, where Marciello and teammates Farfus, Krohn, and Kelvin van der Linde profited from a penalty for the leading Manthey Porsche to claim victory. This result, coupled with his Bathurst podium, fourth at Spa, and a victory at the Suzuka 1000 km, catapulted Marciello into title contention for the 2025 Intercontinental GT Challenge ahead of the final round in Indianapolis. There, Marciello finished third in a weather-impacted finish, causing him to end up second behind Kelvin van der Linde in the IGTC. At Macau, Marciello capped off the year by finishing second to his old rival Fuoco.

== Personal life ==
Marciello is noted for his tall height relative to his competitors.

== Racing record ==
=== Karting career summary ===
Season	Series	Team	Position
2005	Swiss Championship — Super Mini		**1st**
2005	Bridgestone Cup Switzerland — Super Mini		**2nd**
2006	Swiss Championship — Super Mini	KC Ticino	**2nd**
2006	Champions Cup — Super Mini		**1st**
2007	Swiss Championship — KF3	KC Ticino	**2nd**
2007	Bridgestone Cup Europe — KF3		**2nd**
2007	Bridgestone Cup Switzerland — KF3		4th
2008	South Garda Winter Cup — KF3	Spirit	11th
2008	WSK International Series — KF3	Tony Kart Junior RT	14th
2008	Italian Open Masters — KF3	Spirit	7th
2008	Torneo Industrie — KF3	Claudio Marciello	**3rd**
2008	Spanish Championship — KF3		31st
2008	CIK-FIA European Championship — KF3	Tony Kart Junior RT	17th
2008	Bridgestone Cup Europe — KF3		33rd
2008	Copa Campeones Trophy — KF3	Claudio Marciello	**1st**
2009	South Garda Winter Cup — KF3	Intrepid Junior Team	**2nd**
2009	Andrea Margutti Trophy — KF3	Intrepid Junior Team	**3rd**
2009	WSK International Series — KF3	Intrepid Junior Team	4th
2009	CIK-FIA Monaco Kart Cup — KF3	Morsicani	14th
2009	CIK-FIA European Championship — KF3	Intrepid Junior Team	4th
2009	CIK-FIA World Cup — KF3	Intrepid Junior Team	19th
2010	Andrea Margutti Trophy — KF2		24th

=== Racing career summary ===
Season	Series	Team	Races	Wins	Poles	F/Laps	Podiums	Points	Position
2010	Formula Abarth	JD Motorsport	13	2	0	2	4	91	**3rd**
2011	Italian Formula 3 Championship	Prema Powerteam	14	2	1	2	6	123	**3rd**
2011	FIA International Formula 3 Trophy	Prema Powerteam	2	0	0	0	0	N/A	NC†
2012	FIA Formula 3 European Championship	Prema Powerteam	20	7	4	6	9	228.5	**2nd**
2012	Formula 3 Euro Series	Prema Powerteam	24	6	2	6	4	219.5	**3rd**
2012	Masters of Formula 3	Prema Powerteam	1	0	0	0	1	N/A	**2nd**
2012	Macau Grand Prix	Prema Powerteam	2	0	0	0	0	N/A	8th
2012	Toyota Racing Series	M2 Competition	15	1	0	1	2	535	9th
2013	FIA Formula 3 European Championship	Prema Powerteam	30	13	12	8	19	489.5	**1st**
2013	Macau Grand Prix	Prema Powerteam	1	0	1	0	0	N/A	DNF
2014	GP2 Series	Racing Engineering	22	1	1	1	4	74	8th
2015	GP2 Series	Trident	22	0	0	0	4	110	7th
2015	Formula One	Sauber Motorsport	Test and reserve driver						
2016	GP2 Series	Russian Time	22	0	0	0	6	159	4th
2017	Blancpain GT Series Sprint Cup	AKKA ASP	10	0	0	0	2	16	16th
2017	Blancpain GT Series Endurance Cup	AKKA ASP	5	0	0	0	2	43	5th
2017	Intercontinental GT Challenge	AKKA ASP	1	0	0	0	1	15	9th
2017	Blancpain GT Series Asia	GruppeM Racing Team	2	0	0	1	1	30	18th
2017	Blancpain GT Series Asia - Pro-Am	GruppeM Racing Team	2	1	0	1	2	43	11th
2017	FIA Formula 2 Championship	Trident	2	0	0	0	0	0	29th
2017–18	Asian Le Mans Series - GT	FIST-Team AAI	1	0	1	0	1	19	9th
2018	Blancpain GT Series Sprint Cup	AKKA ASP Team	10	2	2	3	6	98	**1st**
2018	Blancpain GT Series Endurance Cup	Mercedes-AMG Team AKKA ASP	5	0	0	0	2	66	**2nd**
2018	Blancpain GT Series Asia	GruppeM Racing Team	10	1	0	4	4	85	7th
2018	Blancpain GT Series Asia - Pro-Am	GruppeM Racing Team	10	3	0	6	6	155	**3rd**
2018	Pirelli World Challenge	CRP Racing	2	0	1	1	0	25	32nd
2018	SprintX GT Championship Series	CRP Racing	2	0	1	1	0	25	18th
2018	ADAC GT Masters	AutoArenA Motorsport	4	0	0	0	1	18	26th
2018	24 Hours of Nürburgring - SP9	AutoArenA Motorsport	1	0	0	0	0	N/A	DNF
2018	VLN Series - SP9	Mercedes-AMG Team HTP Motorsport	1	0	0	0	1	0	NC†
2018	FIA GT World Cup	Mercedes-AMG Team GruppeM Racing	1	0	0	0	0	N/A	9th
2018	Intercontinental GT Challenge	Mercedes-AMG Team SunEnergy1 Racing	1	0	0	0	1	64	**3rd**
2018	Intercontinental GT Challenge	Mercedes-AMG Team AKKA ASP	1	0	0	0	1	64	**3rd**
2018	Intercontinental GT Challenge	Mercedes-AMG Team GruppeM Racing	1	1	1	0	1	64	**3rd**
2018	Intercontinental GT Challenge	Mercedes-AMG Team Strakka Racing	1	0	0	0	0	64	**3rd**
2018–19	Formula E	GEOX Dragon	Test driver						
2019	Blancpain GT World Challenge Europe	AKKA ASP Team	10	3	4	1	4	78.5	**3rd**
2019	Blancpain GT Series Endurance Cup	Mercedes-AMG Team AKKA ASP	5	0	0	0	0	9	25th
2019	FIA GT World Cup	Mercedes-AMG Team GruppeM Racing	1	1	1	0	1	N/A	**1st**
2019	Intercontinental GT Challenge	Mercedes-AMG Team GruppeM Racing	4	0	1	0	3	55	4th
2019	Intercontinental GT Challenge	Mercedes-AMG Team AKKA ASP	1	0	0	0	0	55	4th
2019	VLN Series - SP9	HTP Motorsport	2	1	0	0	1	16.34	19th
2019	24 Hours of Nürburgring - SP9	Mercedes-AMG Team Mann Filter	1	0	0	0	0	N/A	DNF
2020	ADAC GT Masters	Knaus - Team HTP-Winward	14	1	1	1	2	112	6th
2020	GT World Challenge Europe Sprint Cup	AKKA ASP Team	8	2	2	1	5	75.5	**3rd**
2020	GT World Challenge Europe Endurance Cup	AKKA ASP Team	4	0	1	0	2	52	5th
2020	Intercontinental GT Challenge	Mercedes-AMG Team GruppeM Racing	1	0	0	0	0	10	16th
2020	Intercontinental GT Challenge	Mercedes-AMG Team AKKA ASP	1	0	1	0	0	10	16th
2020	Nürburgring Endurance Series - SP9	Mercedes-AMG Team GetSpeed	3	0	0	0	1	24.43	10th
2020	24 Hours of Nürburgring - SP9	Mercedes-AMG Team GetSpeed	1	0	0	0	0	N/A	DNF
2021	ADAC GT Masters	Mann-Filter Team Landgraf-HTP WWR	14	1	1	1	4	150	4th
2021	GT World Challenge Europe Sprint Cup	AKKA ASP Team	10	0	2	2	4	61.5	**3rd**
2021	GT World Challenge Europe Endurance Cup	AKKA ASP Team	5	1	1	0	3	79	**2nd**
2021	Asian Le Mans Series - GT	HubAuto Racing	4	0	2	0	0	28	7th
2021	IMSA SportsCar Championship - GTD	SunEnergy1 Racing	2	0	0	0	1	341	44th
2021	Intercontinental GT Challenge	Mercedes-AMG Team AKKA ASP	3	1	2	1	2	43	4th
2021	Nürburgring Endurance Series - SP9	Mercedes-AMG Team GetSpeed	1	0	0	0	0	0	NC†
2021	24 Hours of Nürburgring - SP9	Mercedes-AMG Team GetSpeed	1	0	0	0	1	N/A	**3rd**
2022	GT World Challenge Europe Sprint Cup	AKKodis ASP Team	10	3	4	6	8	111.5	**2nd**
2022	GT World Challenge Europe Endurance Cup	AKKodis ASP Team	5	1	1	1	3	89	**1st**
2022	IMSA SportsCar Championship - GTD Pro	WeatherTech Racing	1	0	0	1	0	306	26th
2022	IMSA SportsCar Championship - GTD	SunEnergy1 Racing	1	0	0	0	0	128	70th
2022	ADAC GT Masters	MANN-FILTER Team Landgraf	14	1	5	2	8	193	**1st**
2022	Intercontinental GT Challenge	Mercedes-AMG Team AKKodis ASP	1	1	0	0	1	50	5th
2022	Intercontinental GT Challenge	Mercedes-AMG GruppeM Racing	1	0	0	0	0	50	5th
2022	Intercontinental GT Challenge	Mercedes-AMG Team Craft-Bamboo Racing	1	1	0	0	1	50	5th
2022	Nürburgring Endurance Series - SP9	Mercedes-AMG Team Bilstein	1	0	0	0	0	0	NC†
2022	24H GT Series - GT3	Abu Dhabi Racing by HRT Bilstein	1	0	0	0	0	0	NC†
2022	24 Hours of Nürburgring - SP9	Mercedes-AMG Team Bilstein by HRT	1	0	0	0	0	N/A	7th
2022	Macau GT Cup	TORO Racing	2	0	0	1	1	N/A	DNF
2023	Asian Le Mans Series - GT	GetSpeed Performance	4	0	0	1	2	52	**3rd**
2023	British GT Championship - GT3	RAM Racing	9	1	0	2	2	108	7th
2023	GT World Challenge Europe Sprint Cup	AKKodis ASP Team	10	4	2	1	4	90.5	**2nd**
2023	GT World Challenge Europe Endurance Cup	AKKodis ASP Team	5	2	2	1	3	104	**1st**
2023	IMSA SportsCar Championship - LMP2	High Class Racing	1	0	0	0	0	0	NC‡
2023	IMSA SportsCar Championship - GTD	Winward Racing	1	0	0	0	0	131	67th
2023	Intercontinental GT Challenge	Mercedes-AMG Team GruppeM Racing	2	0	1	0	1	57	7th
2023	Intercontinental GT Challenge	AKKodis ASP Team	1	0	0	0	1	57	7th
2023	Intercontinental GT Challenge	Mercedes-AMG Craft-Bamboo Racing	1	0	0	0	1	57	7th
2023	Nürburgring Endurance Series - SP9	Mercedes-AMG Team Bilstein	3	0	0	0	0	0	NC†
2023	24 Hours of Nürburgring - SP9	Mercedes-AMG Team Bilstein by HRT	1	0	1	0	1	N/A	**3rd**
2023	FIA GT World Cup	Mercedes-AMG Team Mann-Filter	1	1	1	0	1	N/A	**1st**
2024	FIA World Endurance Championship - Hypercar	BMW M Team WRT	8	0	0	0	1	39	14th
2024	GT World Challenge Europe Endurance Cup	Team WRT	5	0	0	0	0	34	9th
2024	Intercontinental GT Challenge	Team WRT	2	0	0	0	0	24	10th
2024	Intercontinental GT Challenge	Rowe Racing	1	0	0	0	0	24	10th
2024	Nürburgring Langstrecken-Serie - SP9	Rowe Racing							
2024	24 Hours of Nürburgring - SP9	Rowe Racing	1	0	0	0	0	N/A	7th
2024	British GT Championship - GT3	RAM Racing	5	0	0	1	0	16.5	14th
2024	Italian GT Sprint Championship - GT3	BMW Italia Ceccato Racing	2	2	2	2	2	44	NC†
2024	FIA GT World Cup	TORO Racing powered by MCG	2	1	1	1	1	N/A	18th
2025	FIA World Endurance Championship - Hypercar	BMW M Team WRT	8	0	0	0	0	27	20th
2025	IMSA SportsCar Championship - GTP	BMW M Team RLL	1	0	1	0	0	315	34th
2025	GT World Challenge Europe Sprint Cup	Team WRT	2	1	0	1	1	16.5	13th
2025	Intercontinental GT Challenge	Team WRT	4	1	0	0	3	95	**2nd**
2025	Intercontinental GT Challenge	Rowe Racing	1	1	0	0	1	95	**2nd**
2025	GT World Challenge Europe Endurance Cup	Rowe Racing	5	1	0	0	2	60	4th
2025	Nürburgring Langstrecken-Serie - SP9	Rowe Racing							
2025	24 Hours of Nürburgring - SP9	Rowe Racing	1	1	0	0	1	N/A	**1st**
2025	FIA GT World Cup	Rowe Racing	1	0	0	0	1	N/A	**2nd**
2026	FIA World Endurance Championship - Hypercar	BMW M Team WRT	8	1	1	0	3	85	**3rd**
2026	IMSA SportsCar Championship - GTP	BMW M Team WRT	1	0	0	0	0	252	30th
2026	Nürburgring Langstrecken-Serie - SP9	Rowe Racing							
2026	24 Hours of Nürburgring - SP9	Rowe Racing	1	0	0	0	0	N/A	DNF
2026	GT World Challenge Europe Endurance Cup	Rowe Racing	4	0	0	0	0	26	8th
2026	Intercontinental GT Challenge	Rowe Racing	2	0	0	0	0	19	19th
2026	Intercontinental GT Challenge	Team WRT	1	0	0	0	1	19	19th
2026	Italian GT Championship Sprint Cup - GT3	BMW Italia Ceccato Racing	2	1	0	0	2	35	NC†
2026	FIA GT World Cup	Team WRT							

^{†} As Marciello was a guest driver, he was ineligible to score points.
^{‡} Points only counted towards the Michelin Endurance Cup, and not the overall LMP2 Championship.
^{*} Season still in progress.

=== Complete Formula Abarth results ===
(key)

Year	Entrant	1	2	3	4	5	6	7	8	9	10	11	12	13	14	15	16	DC	Points
2010	JD Motorsport	MIS; 1; 1	MIS; 2; 3	MAG; 1; 2	MAG; 2 Ret	SPA; 1; 6	SPA; 2; 1	IMO; 1 Ret	IMO; 2 DNS	VAR; 1; 7	VAR; 2; 1	VAL; 1; 4	VAL; 2; 4	MUG; 1; 7	MUG; 2; 7	MNZ; 1; 24	MNZ; 2 Ret	3rd	91

^{†} Driver did not finish the race, but was classified as he completed over 90% of the race distance.

=== Complete Italian Formula Three results ===
(key)

Year	Entrant	1	2	3	4	5	6	7	8	9	10	11	12	13	14	15	16	DC	Points
2011	Prema Powerteam	FRA; 1; 3	FRA; 2; 6	MIS; 1; 10	MIS; 2; 1	IMO; 1 Ret	IMO; 2; 5	SPA; 1; 3	SPA; 2; 4	ADR; 1; 1	ADR; 2; 10	**VLL**; **1**; 2	VLL; 2; 12	MUG; 1; 6	MUG; 2; 6	MZA; 1; 6	MZA; 2; 2	3rd	123

^{†} Driver did not finish the race, but was classified as he completed over 90% of the race distance.

=== Complete Formula 3 Euro Series results ===
(key)

Year	Entrant	Engine	1	2	3	4	5	6	7	8	9	10	11	12	13	14	15	16	17	18	19	20	21	22	23	24	DC	Points
2012	Prema Powerteam	Mercedes	HOC; 1; 6	HOC; 2; 1	HOC; 3; 17	BRH; 1; 1	BRH; 2; 7	BRH; 3; 1	RBR; 1; 1	RBR; 2; 9	RBR; 3; 8	**NOR**; **1**; 22†	NOR; 2; 17	NOR; 3; 1	NÜR; 1; 6	NÜR; 2; 2	NÜR; 3 Ret	ZAN; 1; 4	ZAN; 2; 13	ZAN; 3 Ret	**VAL**; **1**; 1	VAL; 2 Ret	VAL; 3; 3	HOC; 1; 3	HOC; 2; 2	HOC; 3; 8	3rd	219.5

^{†} Driver did not finish the race, but was classified as he completed over 90% of the race distance.

=== Complete FIA Formula 3 European Championship results ===
(key)

Year	Entrant	Engine	1	2	3	4	5	6	7	8	9	10	11	12	13	14	15	16	17	18	19	20	21	22	23	24	25	26	27	28	29	30	DC	Points
2012	Prema Powerteam	Mercedes	HOC; 1; 6	HOC; 2; 17	**PAU**; **1**; 1	**PAU**; **2**; 1	BRH; 1; 1	BRH; 2; 1	RBR; 1; 1	RBR; 2; 8	**NOR**; **1**; 22†	NOR; 2; 1	SPA; 1; 11	SPA; 2; 14	NÜR; 1; 6	NÜR; 2 Ret	ZAN; 1; 4	ZAN; 2 Ret	**VAL**; **1**; 1	VAL; 2; 3	HOC; 1; 3	HOC; 2; 8											2nd	228.5
2013	Prema Powerteam	Mercedes	MNZ; 1; 1	MNZ; 2; 2	**MNZ**; **3**; 1	SIL; 1; 6	SIL; 2; 2	SIL; 3; 1	**HOC**; **1**; 1	**HOC**; **2**; 1	HOC; 3; 4	BRH; 1; 2	BRH; 2; 1	BRH; 3 DSQ	RBR; 1; 4	RBR; 2; 13	RBR; 3; 6	NOR; 1; 1	**NOR**; **2**; 3	**NOR**; **3**; 2	**NÜR**; **1**; 1	**NÜR**; **2**; 1	**NÜR**; **3**; 1	ZAN; 1; 5	ZAN; 2; 16	ZAN; 3 Ret	**VAL**; **1**; 1	VAL; 2 Ret	**VAL**; **3**; 1	**HOC**; **1**; 2	HOC; 2; 4	**HOC**; **3**; 1	1st	489.5

^{†} Driver did not finish the race, but was classified as he completed over 90% of the race distance.

=== Complete GP2 Series/FIA Formula 2 Championship results ===
(key) (Races in bold indicate pole position) (Races in italics indicate fastest lap)

Year	Entrant	1	2	3	4	5	6	7	8	9	10	11	12	13	14	15	16	17	18	19	20	21	22	DC	Points
2014	Racing Engineering	BHR; FEA; 18	BHR; SPR; 24	CAT; FEA; Ret	CAT; SPR; 16	MON; FEA; 12	MON; SPR; 19	RBR; FEA; 3	RBR; SPR; 3	**SIL**; **FEA**; Ret	SIL; SPR; Ret	HOC; FEA; 17	HOC; SPR; Ret	HUN; FEA; 19	HUN; SPR; 8	SPA; FEA; 1	SPA; SPR; 14	MNZ; FEA; Ret	MNZ; SPR; 18	SOC; FEA; 3	SOC; SPR; Ret	YMC; FEA; 11	YMC; SPR; 7	8th	74
2015	Trident	BHR; FEA; Ret	BHR; SPR; 20	CAT; FEA; 6	CAT; SPR; 17	MON; FEA; 8	MON; SPR; 2	RBR; FEA; 15	RBR; SPR; 10	SIL; FEA; 6	SIL; SPR; 2	HUN; FEA; 7	HUN; SPR; 4	SPA; FEA; 14	SPA; SPR; 12	MNZ; FEA; 15	MNZ; SPR; 7	SOC; FEA; 6	SOC; SPR; 3	BHR; FEA; 4	BHR; SPR; 5	YMC; FEA; 2	YMC; SPR; C	7th	110
2016	Russian Time	CAT; FEA; 8	CAT; SPR; 5	MON; FEA; 6	MON; SPR; 3	BAK; FEA; 3	BAK; SPR; 11	RBR; FEA; 3	RBR; SPR; 4	SIL; FEA; 9	SIL; SPR; 6	HUN; FEA; 4	HUN; SPR; 8	HOC; FEA; 3	HOC; SPR; 7	SPA; FEA; 4	SPA; SPR; 5	MNZ; FEA; 2	MNZ; SPR; 14	SEP; FEA; 6	SEP; SPR; 2	YMC; FEA; 10	YMC; SPR; 13	4th	159
2017	Trident	BHR; FEA	BHR; SPR	CAT; FEA	CAT; SPR	MON; FEA	MON; SPR	BAK; FEA	BAK; SPR	RBR; FEA; 19	RBR; SPR; Ret	SIL; FEA	SIL; SPR	HUN; FEA	HUN; SPR	SPA; FEA	SPA; SPR	MNZ; FEA	MNZ; SPR	JER; FEA	JER; SPR	YMC; FEA	YMC; SPR	29th	0

=== Complete Formula One participations ===
(key) (Races in bold indicate pole position; races in italics indicate fastest lap)

Year	Entrant	Chassis	Engine	1	2	3	4	5	6	7	8	9	10	11	12	13	14	15	16	17	18	19	WDC	Points
2015	Sauber F1 Team	Sauber C34	Ferrari 060 1.6 V6 t	AUS	MAL; TD	CHN	BHR	ESP; TD	MON	CAN	AUT	GBR; TD	HUN	BEL	ITA	SIN	JPN	RUS	USA; TD	MEX	BRA	ABU	–	–

=== Complete GT World Challenge Europe results ===
==== GT World Challenge Europe Endurance Cup ====
(key) (Races in bold indicate pole position) (Races in italics indicate fastest lap)

Year	Team	Car	Class	1	2	3	4	5	6	7	Pos.	Points
2017	AKKA ASP	Mercedes-AMG GT3	Pro	MNZ; Ret	SIL; 3	LEC; 10	SPA; 6H; 11	SPA; 12H; 4	SPA; 24H; 3	CAT; 7	5th	43
2018	Mercedes-AMG Team AKKA ASP	Mercedes-AMG GT3	Pro	MNZ; 11	SIL; 2	LEC; 4	SPA; 6H; 15	SPA; 12H; 3	SPA; 24H; 6	CAT; 2	2nd	66
2019	Mercedes-AMG Team AKKA ASP	Mercedes-AMG GT3	Pro	MNZ; 39	SIL; Ret	LEC; Ret	SPA; 6H; 4	SPA; 12H; 7	SPA; 24H; 13	CAT; 38	25th	9
2020	AKKA ASP Team	Mercedes-AMG GT3 Evo	Pro	IMO; 3	NÜR; 2	SPA; 6H; 1	SPA; 12H; 37	**SPA**; **24H**; Ret	LEC; 18		5th	52
2021	AKKA ASP Team	Mercedes-AMG GT3 Evo	Pro	MNZ; 2	LEC; 6	SPA; 6H; 8	SPA; 12H; 4	**SPA**; **24H**; Ret	NÜR; 2	CAT; 1	2nd	79
2022	AKKodis ASP Team	Mercedes-AMG GT3 Evo	Pro	IMO; 2	LEC; 3	SPA; 6H; 3	SPA; 12H; 3	**SPA**; **24H**; 1	HOC; 40†	CAT; 5	1st	89
2023	AKKodis ASP Team	Mercedes-AMG GT3 Evo	Pro	MNZ; Ret	LEC; 1	SPA; 6H; 3	SPA; 12H; 2	**SPA**; **24H**; 2	**NÜR**; 1	CAT; 5	1st	104
2024	Team WRT	BMW M4 GT3	Pro	LEC; 4	SPA; 6H; 28	SPA; 12H; 10	SPA; 24H; 24	NÜR; 18	MNZ; 5	JED; 5	9th	34
2025	Rowe Racing	BMW M4 GT3 Evo	Pro	LEC; 7	MNZ; Ret	SPA; 6H; 8	SPA; 12H; 8	SPA; 24H; 5	NÜR; 1	CAT; 3	4th	60
2026	Rowe Racing	BMW M4 GT3 Evo	Pro	LEC; 6	MNZ; 5	SPA; 6H; 5	SPA; 12H; 21	SPA; 24H; 9	NÜR; 17	ALG	8th	26

^{*}Season still in progress.

==== GT World Challenge Europe Sprint Cup ====
(key) (Races in bold indicate pole position) (Races in italics indicate fastest lap)

Year	Team	Car	Class	1	2	3	4	5	6	7	8	9	10	Pos.	Points
2017	AKKA ASP	Mercedes-AMG GT3	Pro	MIS; QR; 3	MIS; CR; 16	BRH; QR; 8	BRH; CR; 7	ZOL; QR; 2	ZOL; CR; 23	HUN; QR; 9	HUN; CR; 12	NÜR; QR; 13	NÜR; CR; 14	16th	16
2018	AKKA ASP Team	Mercedes-AMG GT3	Pro	ZOL; 1; 8	ZOL; 2; 2	BRH; 1; 3	BRH; 2; 4	MIS; 1; 2	**MIS**; **2**; 10	HUN; 1; 2	**HUN**; **2**; 1	NÜR; 1; 4	NÜR; 2; 1	1st	98
2019	AKKA ASP Team	Mercedes-AMG GT3	Pro	BRH; 1; 4	BRH; 2; 19	MIS; 1; 2	**MIS**; **2**; 15	**ZAN**; **1**; 1	ZAN; 2; 6	NÜR; 1; 9	NÜR; 2 Ret	**HUN**; **1**; 1	**HUN**; **2**; 1	3rd	78.5
2020	AKKA ASP Team	Mercedes-AMG GT3 Evo	Pro	MIS; 1; 8	**MIS**; **2**; 1	MIS; 3; 6	MAG; 1; 7	MAG; 2; 2	ZAN; 1	ZAN; 2	CAT; 1; 3	CAT; 2; 3	**CAT**; **3**; 1	3rd	75.5
2021	AKKA ASP Team	Mercedes-AMG GT3 Evo	Pro	MAG; 1; 5	MAG; 2; 3	ZAN; 1; 2	**ZAN**; **2**; 25	MIS; 1; 5	MIS; 2; 2	BRH; 1; 17	**BRH**; **2**; 6	VAL; 1; 3	VAL; 2; 18	3rd	61.5
2022	AKKodis ASP Team	Mercedes-AMG GT3 Evo	Pro	BRH; 1; 3	**BRH**; **2**; 1	MAG; 1; 2	**MAG**; **2**; 1	ZAN; 1; 23	**ZAN**; **2**; 1	MIS; 1; 2	MIS; 2; 2	VAL; 1; 7	**VAL**; **2**; 3	2nd	111.5
2023	AKKodis ASP Team	Mercedes-AMG GT3 Evo	Pro	**BRH**; **1**; 1	BRH; 2; 6	**MIS**; **1**; 1	MIS; 2; 4	HOC; 1 Ret	HOC; 2; 1	VAL; 1; 1	VAL; 2; 7	ZAN; 1; 4	ZAN; 2 Ret	2nd	90.5
2025	Team WRT	BMW M4 GT3 Evo	Pro	BRH; 1	BRH; 2	ZAN; 1	ZAN; 2	MIS; 1; 1	MIS; 2; 21	MAG; 1	MAG; 2	VAL; 1	VAL; 2	13th	16.5

=== Complete Intercontinental GT Challenge results ===
Year	Manufacturer	Car	1	2	3	4	5	Pos.	Points
2017	Mercedes-Benz	Mercedes-AMG GT3	BAT	SPA; 3	LAG			9th	15
2018	Mercedes-AMG	Mercedes-AMG GT3	BAT; 2	SPA; 3	**SUZ**; 1	LAG; 7		3rd	64
2019	Mercedes-AMG	Mercedes-AMG GT3	BAT; 2	LAG; 2	SPA; 10	SUZ; 2	KYA; Ret	4th	55
2020	Mercedes-AMG	Mercedes-AMG GT3 Evo	BAT; 5	IND	SPA; Ret	KYA		16th	10
2021	Mercedes-AMG	Mercedes-AMG GT3 Evo	SPA; Ret	IND; 2	KYA; 1			5th	43
2022	Mercedes-AMG	Mercedes-AMG GT3 Evo	BAT	SPA; 1	IND; 1	GUL; Ret		5th	50
2023	Mercedes-AMG	Mercedes-AMG GT3 Evo	**BAT**; 3	**KYA**; 7	SPA; 2	IND; 2	ABU	7th	57
2024	BMW	BMW M4 GT3	BAT; 4	NÜR; 5	SPA; 9	IND		10th	24
2025	BMW	BMW M4 GT3	BAT; 2	NÜR; 1	SPA; 4	SUZ; 1	IND; 3	2nd	95
2026	BMW	BMW M4 GT3 Evo	BAT; 3	NÜR; Ret	SPA; 8	SUZ	IND	19th	19

=== Complete Bathurst 12 Hour results ===
Year	Team	Co-Drivers	Car	Class	Laps	Pos.	Class Pos.
2018	(Australia) Scott Taylor Motorsport (United States) Team SunEnergy1 Racing	(Australia) Kenny Habul (France) Tristan Vautier (Australia) Jamie Whincup	Mercedes-AMG GT3	APP	271	**2nd**	**2nd**
2019	(Hong Kong) Mercedes-AMG Team GruppeM Racing	(Germany) Maximilian Buhk (Germany) Maximilian Götz	Mercedes-AMG GT3	APP	312	**3rd**	**3rd**
2020	(Hong Kong) GruppeM Racing	(Germany) Maximilian Buhk (Brazil) Felipe Fraga	Mercedes-AMG GT3 Evo	**P**	314	6th	6th
2023	(Hong Kong) GruppeM Racing	(Germany) Maro Engel (Canada) Mikaël Grenier	Mercedes-AMG GT3 Evo	**P**	323	**3rd**	**3rd**
2024	(Belgium) BMW M Team WRT	(Belgium) Maxime Martin (Italy) Valentino Rossi	BMW M4 GT3	**P**	275	5th	5th
2025	(Belgium) Team WRT	(Belgium) Charles Weerts (Italy) Valentino Rossi	BMW M4 GT3	**P**	306	**2nd**	**2nd**
2026	(Belgium) Team WRT	(Brazil) Augusto Farfus (Italy) Valentino Rossi	BMW M4 GT3 Evo	**P**	262	**3rd**	**3rd**

=== Complete ADAC GT Masters results ===
(key) (Races in bold indicate pole position) (Races in italics indicate fastest lap)

Year	Team	Car	1	2	3	4	5	6	7	8	9	10	11	12	13	14	DC	Points
2018	AutoArenA Motorsport	Mercedes-AMG GT3	OSC; 1	OSC; 2	MST; 1	MST; 2	RBR; 1	RBR; 2	NÜR; 1 Ret	NÜR; 2; 21	ZAN; 1; 13	ZAN; 2; 2	SAC; 1	SAC; 2	HOC; 1	HOC; 2	26th	18
2020	Knaus - Team HTP-Winward	Mercedes-AMG GT3 Evo	LAU1; 1; 18	LAU1; 2; 10	NÜR; 1; 6	NÜR; 2; 8	HOC; 1; 6	HOC; 2; 7	SAC; 1 Ret	SAC; 2; 5	RBR; 1; 6	RBR; 2; 10	LAU2; 1; 15	LAU2; 2 Ret	OSC; 1; 3	**OSC**; **2**; 1^{1}	6th	112
2021	Mann-Filter Team Landgraf-HTP WWR	Mercedes-AMG GT3 Evo	**OSC**; **1**; 1^{1}	OSC; 2 Ret	RBR; 1; 4	RBR; 2; 10	ZAN; 1; 9	ZAN; 2; 2	LAU; 1; 4	LAU; 2; 3	SAC; 1; 4	SAC; 2 Ret	HOC; 1; 20	HOC; 2; 2	NÜR; 1; 5	NÜR; 2; 19	4th	150
2022	Mann-Filter Team Landgraf	Mercedes-AMG GT3 Evo	OSC; 1; 3	OSC; 2; 3^{3}	**RBR**; **1**; 3^{1}	RBR; 2; 14	ZAN; 1; 14	ZAN; 2; 16	**NÜR**; **1**; 1^{1}	**NÜR**; **2**; 2^{1}	LAU; 1; 5	LAU; 2; 3	**SAC**; **1**; 2^{1}	SAC; 2; 2	**HOC**; **1**; 5^{1}	HOC; 2 Ret	1st	193

=== Complete IMSA SportsCar Championship results ===
(key) (Races in bold indicate pole position; races in italics indicate fastest lap)

Year	Entrant	Class	Make	Engine	1	2	3	4	5	6	7	8	9	10	11	12	Rank	Points	Ref
2021	SunEnergy1 Racing	GTD	Mercedes-AMG GT3 Evo	Mercedes-AMG M159 6.2 L V8	DAY; 2	SEB	MDO	DET	WGL	WGL	LIM	ELK	LGA	LBH	VIR	PET	44th	341	
2022	SunEnergy1	GTD	Mercedes-AMG GT3 Evo	Mercedes-AMG M159 6.2 L V8	DAY; 21	SEB		LGA	MDO	DET	WGL	MOS	LIM	ELK	VIR	PET	70th	128	
2022	WeatherTech Racing	GTD Pro	Mercedes-AMG GT3 Evo	Mercedes-AMG M159 6.2 L V8			LBH; 4										26th	306	
2023	High Class Racing	LMP2	Oreca 07	Gibson GK428 4.2 L V8	DAY; 8†	SEB		LGA									NC†	0†	
2023	Winward Racing	GTD	Mercedes-AMG GT3 Evo	Mercedes-AMG M159 6.2 L V8			LBH		WGL; 20	MOS	LIM	ELK	VIR	IMS	PET		67th	131	
2025	BMW M Team RLL	GTP	BMW M Hybrid V8	BMW P66/3 4.0 L Turbo V8	**DAY**; 4	SEB	LBH	LGA	DET	WGL	ELK	IMS	PET				34th	315	
2026	BMW M Team WRT	GTP	BMW M Hybrid V8	BMW P66/3 4.0 L turbo V8	DAY; 8	SEB	LBH	LGA	DET	WGL	ELK	IMS	PET				30th	252	

^{†} Points only counted towards the Michelin Endurance Cup, and not the overall LMP2 Championship.

=== Complete British GT Championship results ===
(key) (Races in bold indicate pole position) (Races in italics indicate fastest lap)

Year	Team	Car	Class	1	2	3	4	5	6	7	8	9	DC	Points
2023	RAM Racing	Mercedes-AMG GT3 Evo	GT3	OUL; 1; 5	OUL; 2; 2	SIL; 1; 5	DON; 1 Ret	SNE; 1; 8	SNE; 2; 1	ALG; 1; 4	BRH; 1 Ret	DON; 1; 4	7th	108
2024	RAM Racing	BMW M4 GT3	GT3	OUL; 1; 12	OUL; 2; 7	SIL; 1; 9	DON; 1; 17	SPA; 1; 10	SNE; 1	SNE; 2	DON; 1	BRA; 1	14th	16.5

=== Complete FIA World Endurance Championship results ===
(key) (Races in bold indicate pole position) (Races in italics indicate fastest lap)

Year	Entrant	Class	Car	Engine	1	2	3	4	5	6	7	8	Rank	Points
2024	BMW M Team WRT	Hypercar	BMW M Hybrid V8	BMW P66/3 4.0 L Turbo V8	QAT; 14	IMO; DSQ	SPA; 11	LMS; Ret	SÃO; 9	COA; 8	FUJ; 2	BHR; 5	14th	39
2025	BMW M Team WRT	Hypercar	BMW M Hybrid V8	BMW P66/3 4.0 L Turbo V8	QAT; 4	IMO; 6	SPA; 10	LMS; 17	SÃO; 17	COA; 12	FUJ; Ret	BHR; Ret	20th	27
2026	BMW M Team WRT	Hypercar	BMW M Hybrid V8	BMW P66/3 4.0 L Turbo V8	IMO; 7	SPA; 2	**LMS**; Ret	SÃO; 1	COA; 8	FUJ; 3	CAT; 7	MNZ; 5	3rd	85

=== Complete 24 Hours of Le Mans results ===
Year	Team	Co-Drivers	Car	Class	Laps	Pos.	Class Pos.
2024	(Germany) BMW M Team WRT	(Belgium) Dries Vanthoor (Germany) Marco Wittmann	BMW M Hybrid V8	Hypercar	102	DNF	DNF
2025	(Germany) BMW M Team WRT	(Denmark) Kevin Magnussen (Belgium) Dries Vanthoor	BMW M Hybrid V8	Hypercar	361	31st	18th
2026	(Germany) BMW M Team WRT	(Denmark) Kevin Magnussen (Belgium) Dries Vanthoor	BMW M Hybrid V8	Hypercar	272	DNF	DNF

== Notes ==
Sporting positions
Preceded by Daniel Juncadella	FIA Formula 3 European Championship; Champion; 2013	Succeeded by Esteban Ocon
Preceded by Robin Frijns; Stuart Leonard	Blancpain GT Series Sprint Cup; Champion; 2018; With: Michael Meadows	Succeeded by Andrea Caldarelli; Marco Mapelli (GT World Challenge Europe)
Preceded by Mirko Bortolotti; Christian Engelhart	Blancpain GT Series; Champion; 2018	Succeeded by Andrea Caldarelli; Marco Mapelli
Preceded by Augusto Farfus	FIA GT World Cup; Winner; 2019	Succeeded by Ye Hongli (Macau GT Cup)
Preceded by Alessandro Pier Guidi; Nicklas Nielsen; Côme Ledogar	GT World Challenge Europe Endurance Cup; Champion; 2022-2023; With: Daniel Juncadella (2022), Jules Gounon (2022-23) & Timur Boguslavskiy (2023)	Succeeded by Alessandro Pier Guidi; Alessio Rovera
Preceded by Dries Vanthoor; Charles Weerts	GT World Challenge Europe; Champion; 2022-2023; With: Timur Boguslavskiy (2023)	Succeeded by Lucas Auer; Maro Engel
Preceded by Christopher Mies; Ricardo Feller	ADAC GT Masters; Champion; 2022	Succeeded by Elias Seppänen; Salman Owega
Preceded by Maro Engel	FIA GT World Cup; Winner; 2023	Succeeded by Maro Engel
Awards and achievements
Preceded by Chaz Mostert	Allan Simonsen Trophy (Pole position Bathurst 12 Hour); 2019	Succeeded by Matt Campbell
