= 2019 FIA GT World Cup =

5th World Cup for GT3-spec race cars in Macau

Race details
Date	17 November 2019
Official name	SJM Macau GT Cup – FIA GT World Cup
Location	Guia Circuit, Macau
Course	Temporary street circuit 6.120 km (3.803 mi)
Distance	Qualification Race; 12 laps, 73.440 km (45.634 mi); Main Race; 18 laps, 110.160 km (68.450 mi)
- Qualification Race

Pole
Driver	Raffaele Marciello (ITA)	Mercedes-AMG Team GruppeM Racing
Time	2:15.669

Fastest lap
Driver	Laurens Vanthoor (BEL)	Rowe Racing
Time	2:17.302 (on lap 12)

Podium
First	Raffaele Marciello (ITA)	Mercedes-AMG Team GruppeM Racing
Second	Earl Bamber (NZL)	Rowe Racing
Third	Laurens Vanthoor (BEL)	Rowe Racing
- Main Race

Pole
Driver	Raffaele Marciello (ITA)	Mercedes-AMG Team GruppeM Racing

Fastest lap
Driver	Earl Bamber (NZL)	Rowe Racing
Time	2:17.182 (on lap 16)

Podium
First	Raffaele Marciello (ITA)	Mercedes-AMG Team GruppeM Racing
Second	Laurens Vanthoor (BEL)	Rowe Racing
Third	Earl Bamber (NZL)	Rowe Racing

The 2019 FIA GT World Cup (formally the SJM Macau GT Cup – FIA GT World Cup) was a Grand Touring (GT) sports car race held on the Guia Circuit in Macau on 17 November. It was the fifth edition of the FIA GT World Cup and the twelfth GT3 car race to be held in Macau. The event promoter, the Automobile General Association Macau-China, appointed the motorsports organiser Stéphane Ratel Organisation (SRO) to form a grid. The edition itself was made up of two races: a 12-lap qualifying race and an 18-lap main event.

Raffaele Marciello of Mercedes-AMG Team GruppeM Racing won both the qualifying and main races from pole position. Marciello led every lap of both races to achieve Mercedes-Benz's third victory in the FIA GT World Cup since Maro Engel won in 2015 and Edoardo Mortara won in 2017. Second place went to Porsche driver Laurens Vanthoor of Rowe Racing, with his teammate Earl Bamber completing the podium in third.

== Background and entry list ==
The 2019 FIA GT World Cup was confirmed at the FIA World Motor Sport Council meeting on 6 December 2018, in Saint Petersburg, Russia. It was part of the 2019 Macau Grand Prix undercard. It took place on the 6.120 km (3.803 mi) Guia Circuit in the streets of Macau on 17 November 2019 after three days of practice and qualifying. It was the fifth FIA GT World Cup and the twelfth GT3 race in Macau since 2008. The Fédération Internationale de l'Automobile (FIA), which oversaw motor racing, and the Stéphane Ratel Organisation jointly managed it. According to the event rules, the manufacturers' championship was presented to the manufacturer of the winning entrant's car.

Drivers had to have competed in an FIA-regulated championship race based on GT3 regulations in the previous two seasons or have significant experience in Grand Touring (GT) cars to enter the race. The event was open to drivers with platinum or gold licences. Following lobbying by GT3 manufacturers and privateers, the FIA allowed amateur drivers (dubbed gentlemen drivers) to race in the 2019 event by reintroducing the silver rated category class for the first time since the 2016 edition. Only Bronze rated competitors could not race. Entries were open from 2 July to 31 August. The FIA released the entry list on 17 October. There were 17 drivers (11 factory drivers) representing 13 nationalities and four manufacturers: Audi, BMW, Mercedes-AMG, and Porsche. (Note: GT3 car manufacturers Aston Martin, Bentley, Lamborghini, McLaren and Nissan were absent in Macau.) This was a two-driver increase from 2018, and it included all four previous FIA GT World Cup winners: Maro Engel, Augusto Farfus, Edoardo Mortara and Laurens Vanthoor.

An FIA investigation into Sophia Flörsch's accident at the 2018 Macau Grand Prix resulted in various track safety improvements. SAFER barriers were retrofitted at Lisboa and San Francisco Bend turns, and the barriers between Reservoir and San Francisco Bend corners were realigned. Hospital Bend turn's wall was moved back by 2 m (6.6 ft) and the photographers' bunker at Lisboa corner was dismantled.

== Practice and qualifying ==
There were two half-an-hour practice sessions preceding the 18 November race. Earl Bamber's No. 98 Rowe Racing Porsche 911 GT3 R led the first practice session on the afternoon of November 14 before improving to a time of 2:17.058 on his final lap. His teammate Laurens Vanthoor was second-quickest, followed by Mercedes-AMG Team GruppeM Racing's Engel and Raffaele Marciello and Craft-Bamboo Racing's Mortara in positions third through fifth. Mortara had been faster late in practice, but he overshot the Lisboa corner entry and made slight contact with the outside barrier. Engel also went off the circuit but continued. Bamber lapped fastest at 2:17.360 in the second practice session on the afternoon of 15 November. His teammate Laurens Vanthoor was second, with Kelvin van der Linde of Audi Sport Team Rutronik, Phoenix Racing's Christopher Haase, and Marciello were third to fifth. Weian Chen caused the first of two stoppages when he ran onto some oil and struck the Reservoir Bend turn barrier. Soon after, Engel stopped his car with apparent mechanical trouble. The session resumed once both cars were removed. A high-speed collision for Absolute Racing's Kévin Estre at Mandarin Oriental Bend corner barrier caused a second stoppage.

Friday afternoon's half-hour qualifying session determined the qualification race's starting order with each driver's fastest lap times. The setting sun resulted in lower track temperatures. Porsches were faster through the mountain section while Mercedes were quicker in the final sector. Marciello, the 2018 Blancpain GT Series champion, set a lap time of 2:15.699 in the No. 999 GruppeM Racing Mercedes-AMG GT3 at the session's end to achieve his second consecutive pole position for the qualifying race. He demoted the highest-placed Audi driver Dries Vanthoor for Audi Sport Team WRT to second after lacking pace in practice. Rowe's Bamber and Laurens Vanthoor were not as quick as they had been in practice, qualifying, third and fourth, separated by two-tenths of a second. Engel was third before falling to fifth late on, being joined by his teammate Mortara in sixth. Audi drivers occupied seventh and eighth with Haase (who was fastest early on but sustained a puncture later on) ahead of Van Der Linde. Alexandre Imperatori and Charles Weerts of Team WRT took ninth and tenth. FIST-AAI Team's Joel Eriksson was the highest-placed BMW driver in 11th, ahead of his brandmate Farfus in 12th. Craft-Bamboo Racing's Alessio Picariello qualified 13th with Estre 14th, Solite Indigo Racing's Roelof Bruins in 15th, Zun Motorsport Crew's Adderly Fong 16th and Chen completing the starting order in 17th. Separate accidents involving Fong and Chen caused stoppages to qualifying.

=== Qualifying classification ===
Final qualifying classification
Pos.	Class	No.	Driver	Team	Manufacturer	Time	Gap
1	P	999	Raffaele Marciello (ITA)	(Hong Kong) Mercedes-AMG Team GruppeM Racing	Mercedes-Benz	2:15.669	–
2	G	25	Dries Vanthoor (BEL)	(Belgium) Audi Sport Team WRT (Note: Car No. 10 entered as Team WRT and car No. 25 entered as Audi Sport Team WRT.)	Audi	2:15.972	+0.303
3	P	98	Earl Bamber (NZL)	(Germany) Rowe Racing	Porsche	2:16.066	+0.397
4	P	99	Laurens Vanthoor (BEL)	(Germany) Rowe Racing	Porsche	2:16.195	+0.526
5	P	888	Maro Engel (DEU)	(Hong Kong) Mercedes-AMG Team GruppeM Racing	Mercedes-Benz	2:16.297	+0.628
6	P	77	Edoardo Mortara (CHE)	(Hong Kong) Mercedes-AMG Team Craft-Bamboo Racing	Mercedes-Benz	2:16.316	+0.647
7	P	5	Christopher Haase (DEU)	(Germany) Phoenix Racing	Audi	2:16.475	+0.806
8	G	31	Kelvin van der Linde (ZAF)	(Germany) Audi Sport Team Rutronik	Audi	2:16.591	+0.922
9	G	911	Alexandre Imperatori (CHE)	(China) Absolute Racing	Porsche	2:16.934	+1.265
10	S	10	Charles Weerts (BEL)	(Belgium) Team WRT	Audi	2:17.058	+1.389
11	P	91	Joel Eriksson (SWE)	(Chinese Taipei) FIST-Team AAI	BMW	2:17.408	+1.739
12	P	42	Augusto Farfus (BRA)	(Germany) BMW Team Schnitzer	BMW	2:17.606	+1.937
13	S	88	Alessio Picariello (BEL)	(Hong Kong) Mercedes-AMG Team Craft-Bamboo Racing	Mercedes-Benz	2:17.690	+2.021
14	P	912	Kévin Estre (FRA)	(China) Absolute Racing	Porsche	2:17.940	+2.270
15	S	97	Roelof Bruins (KOR)	(South Korea) Solite Indigo Racing	Mercedes-Benz	2:18.588	+2.919
16	S	7	Adderly Fong (HKG)	(China) Zun Motorsport Crew	Mercedes-Benz	2:19.200	+3.531
17	S	66	Weian Chen (CHN)	(China) Audi Sport Asia Team TSRT	Audi	2:19.928	+4.258

Categorisation
Icon	Class
P	Platinum
G	Gold
S	Silver

== Qualifying race ==
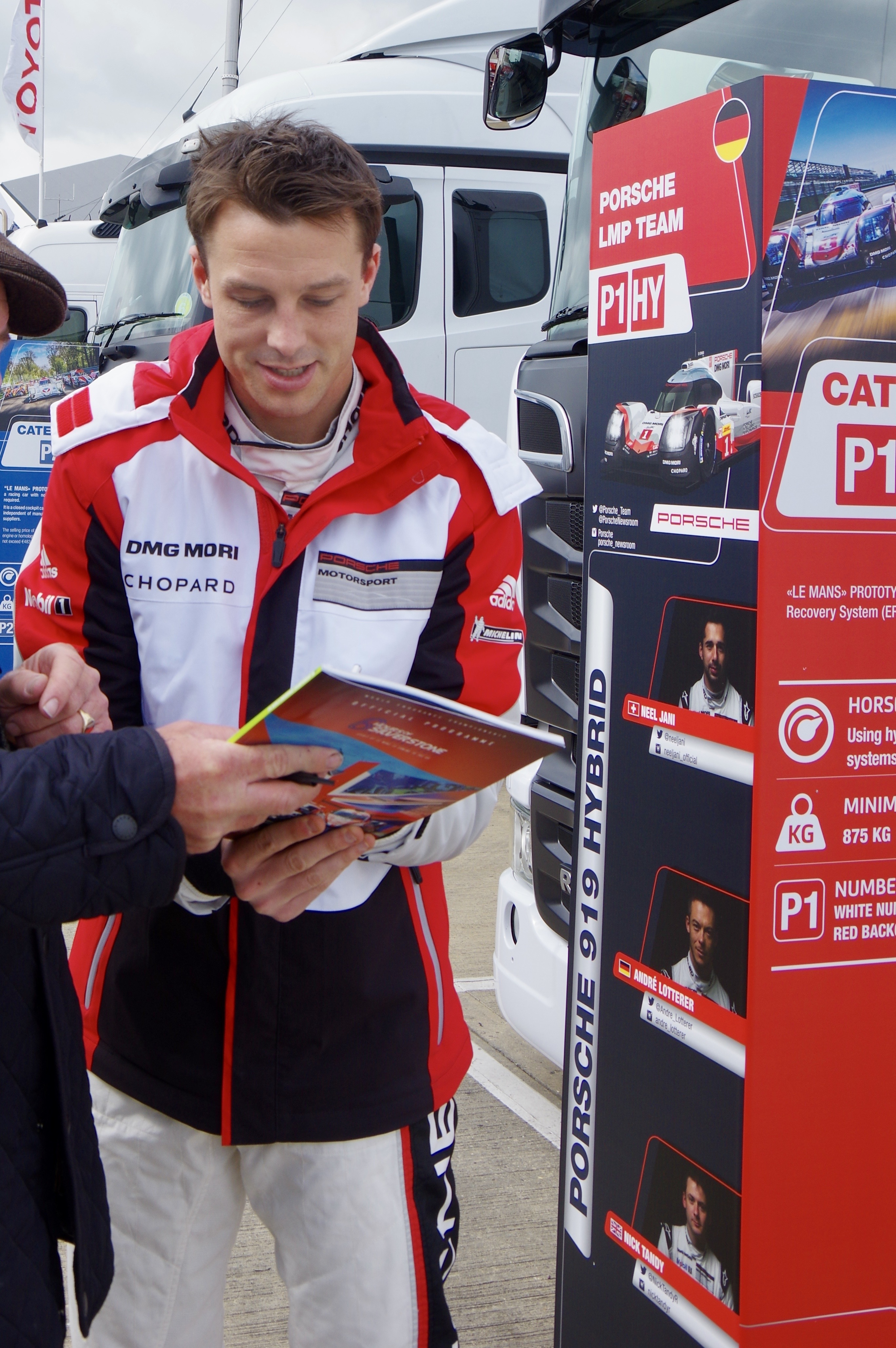
Earl Bamber (pictured in 2017) finished second in the qualification race

The 12-lap qualifying race to set the main race's starting order was scheduled to start in an air temperature of 25 °C (77 °F) at 13:05 Macau Standard Time (UTC+08:00) on 16 November, but was delayed for half an hour due to race management noticing a technical issue with the starting lights gantry. Picariello was forced off the grid and into the pit lane after his car would not start during the formation lap. There, he started after some quick troubleshooting. Dries Vanthoor attempted to overtake pole-position starter Marciello at the start by slipstreaming him, but instead he crashed into the outside wall of the Mandarin Bend corner with the rear of his car. Dries Vanthoor stopped at the entry to Lisboa turn due to car bodywork damage and a left-rear puncture. Further round the lap, Chen lost control of his car and stopped briefly before continuing. At the conclusion of the first lap, the safety car was used for the first time to move Dries Vanthoor's car to a safe area. Racing resumed on lap four and Maricello began to pull away from Rowe teammates Bamber and Laurens Vanthoor who were close behind one another in second and third.

Engel attempted to pass van der Linde for fifth on the outside at the braking zone for Lisboa turn on lap five, but made minor contact with the latter's car's rear. As he drove onto the rumble strips, Engel lost control of his vehicle, slammed into the inside guardrail, and struck Mortara in the side. Both Engel and Mortara retired with car damage and the safety car was deployed again so that the cars could be extricated. Van Der Linde was able to enter the pit lane to retire with car damage. The incident promoted Haase and Farfus to fourth and fifth. Five laps remained when racing resumed, with Marciello again leading Bamber in second. Farfus overtook Haase for fourth into Lisboa turn on the eighth lap, as the top three pulled away from the rest of the field. In the final laps, Bamber and Laurens Vanthoor appeared to be quicker in the track's tighter sections but could not match Marciello's overall pace. Maricello thus led for the remainder of the event, claiming victory and pole position for the main race. Bamber was 0.866 seconds behind in second, with teammate Laurens Vanthoor in third. Farfus finished fourth after starting 12th, and Haase finished fifth. Imperatori, Weerts, and Estre finished sixth through eighth. Eriksson, ninth, had anti-lock braking system issues, causing him to frequently lock his tyres and brake early for corners. Fong, Bruins and Picariello were the final finishers.

=== Qualification Race classification ===
Final classification of the qualifying race
Pos.	Class	No.	Driver	Team	Manufacturer	Laps	Time/Retired
1	P	999	Raffaele Marciello (ITA)	(Hong Kong) Mercedes-AMG Team GruppeM Racing	Mercedes-Benz	12	33:05.753
2	P	98	Earl Bamber (NZL)	(Germany) Rowe Racing	Porsche	12	+0.866
3	P	99	Laurens Vanthoor (BEL)	(Germany) Rowe Racing	Porsche	12	+1.538
4	P	42	Augusto Farfus (BRA)	(Germany) BMW Team Schnitzer	BMW	12	+8.744
5	P	5	Christopher Haase (DEU)	(Germany) Phoenix Racing	Audi	12	+9.521
6	G	911	Alexandre Imperatori (CHE)	(China) Absolute Racing	Porsche	12	+10.377
7	S	10	Charles Weerts (BEL)	(Belgium) Team WRT	Audi	12	+11.446
8	P	912	Kévin Estre (FRA)	(China) Absolute Racing	Porsche	12	+11.720
9	P	91	Joel Eriksson (SWE)	(Chinese Taipei) FIST-Team AAI	BMW	12	+14.824
10	S	7	Adderly Fong (HKG)	(China) Zun Motorsport Crew	Mercedes-Benz	12	+15.334
11	S	97	Roelof Bruins (KOR)	(South Korea) Solite Indigo Racing	Mercedes-Benz	12	+16.145
12	S	88	Alessio Picariello (BEL)	(Hong Kong) Mercedes-AMG Team Craft-Bamboo Racing	Mercedes-Benz	12	+16.666
Ret	G	31	Kelvin van der Linde (ZAF)	(Germany) Audi Sport Team Rutronik	Audi	5	Retired
Ret	P	77	Edoardo Mortara (CHE)	(Hong Kong) Mercedes-AMG Team Craft-Bamboo Racing	Mercedes-Benz	4	Retired
Ret	P	888	Maro Engel (DEU)	(Hong Kong) Mercedes-AMG Team GruppeM Racing	Mercedes-Benz	4	Retired
Ret	S	66	Weian Chen (CHN)	(China) Audi Sport Asia Team TSRT	Audi	3	Retired
Ret	G	25	Dries Vanthoor (BEL)	(Belgium) Audi Sport Team WRT	Audi	0	Retired

== Main race ==
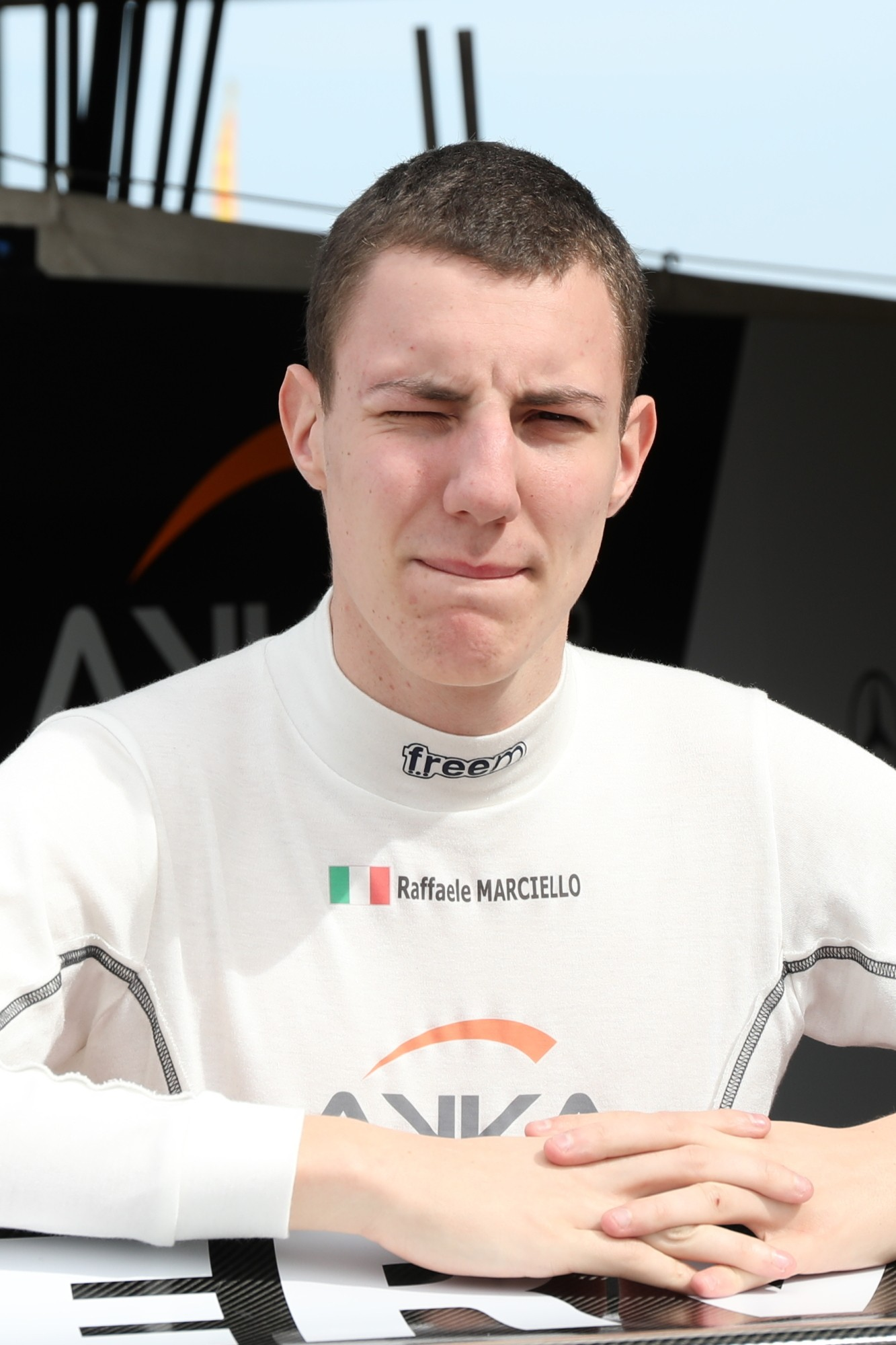
Raffaele Marciello (pictured in 2017) led every lap of each of the qualification and main race to win the FIA GT World Cup.

At 12:25 p.m. local time on November 17, the 18-lap main race began in dry weather of 26 °C (79 °F). Due to the collision with Mortara in the qualifying event, Engel was penalised with a pit lane start. Laurens Vanthoor got off to a faster start than Bamber, passing his teammate for second place as Maricello maintained the lead. The leading trio pulled away from the field, as Bamber held off Farfus in the first lap and Marciello established a half-a-second gap over Vanthoor. Estre attempted to pass Imperatori on the inside into Lisboa corner on the second lap, but collided with the side of his teammate's car. Imperatori was sent into the Lisboa tyre barrier and retired from the race shortly after. On lap three, Dries Vanthoor passed Weerts for tenth. Estre lost control of his car on the inside of the kerb through the quick Mandarin Oriental Bend corner two laps later. In an incident similar to Dries Vanthoor's the day before, he made high-speed contact with the guardrail wall at the turn's exit. A wheel from Estre's car detached and rolled across the track, but no other driver hit it, and debris from his car littered the track. Estre pulled over to the side of the track, and the safety car was dispatched to move the Porsche off the track.

Following the removal of Estre's car from the track, racing resumed at the conclusion of lap eight. Farfus made a quick restart and used his faster straightline speed to briefly pass Bamber's slower starting car for third into the Mandarin Oriental Bend turn. Vanthoor unsuccessfully tried to pass Marciello for the lead at Lisboa turn. Bamber was able to reclaim third on the inside entering Lisboa corner when Farfus had to slow for Laurens Vanthoor, who made slight contact with the rear of Marciello's car. On lap 10, van der Linde passed Bruins for tenth. With a gap of more than a second on lap 13 due to Maricello's personal best sector times, Aware he was unable to match the Mercedes' pace, Vanthoor let his teammate Bamber take second, allowing Bamber to close in on Marciello. Bamber was six-tenths of a second faster than Maricello and close behind him. On the 15th lap, Bamber made slight contact with the barrier after running wide at the Police Bend corner and lost his left exterior wing mirror.

"I would like to thank GruppeM Racing for the amazing car and also Mercedes-AMG. Porsche have been really close the whole weekend so I am really happy that we finally won. I have always been really close to winning this race from Formula 3 when I was on pole and last year in GT, but Macau is always Macau and it's really special to make it all perfect and finally I did. It is just an amazing feeling – to win this it also means I can be regarded as one of the best!"

— Raffaele Marciello on winning the 2019 FIA GT World Cup.

When Marciello was cautious entering the Melco hairpin, Bamber closed in on him again, making slight contact with the rear of his vehicle on the final lap, attempting to find a way past. Marciello led all of the racing laps over the weekend in only his third FIA GT World Cup start, achieving Mercedes' third victory in the event, following Engel in 2015 and Mortara in 2017. In accordance with a pre-race agreement, Bamber purposefully slowed through the R Bend corner and the start/finish straight, giving his teammate second as Bamber finished third. Farfus finished fourth, leading the close group of Haase, Mortara, Eriksson, Dries Vanthoor, Engel and Van Der Linde in positions five through ten. The final classified finishers were Bruins, Weerts and Weian with Fong and Picariello the two other retirements.

The sixth running of the FIA GT World Cup was scheduled for 2020, but the FIA cancelled it due to the COVID-19 pandemic and replaced it with the Macau GT Cup, which was only open to racers from local racing series.

=== Main Race classification ===
Final classification of the main race
Pos.	Class	No.	Driver	Team	Manufacturer	Laps	Time/Retired
1	P	999	Raffaele Marciello (ITA)	(Hong Kong) Mercedes-AMG Team GruppeM Racing	Mercedes-Benz	18	45:14.442
2	P	99	Laurens Vanthoor (BEL)	(Germany) Rowe Racing	Porsche	18	+3.818
3	P	98	Earl Bamber (NZL)	(Germany) Rowe Racing	Porsche	18	+4.700
4	P	42	Augusto Farfus (BRA)	(Germany) BMW Team Schnitzer	BMW	18	+23.618
5	P	5	Christopher Haase (DEU)	(Germany) Phoenix Racing	Audi	18	+24.268
6	P	77	Edoardo Mortara (CHE)	(Hong Kong) Mercedes-AMG Team Craft-Bamboo Racing	Mercedes-Benz	18	+25.063
7	P	91	Joel Eriksson (SWE)	(Chinese Taipei) FIST-Team AAI	BMW	18	+25.978
8	G	25	Dries Vanthoor (BEL)	(Belgium) Audi Sport Team WRT	Audi	18	+26.573
9	P	888	Maro Engel (DEU)	(Hong Kong) Mercedes-AMG Team GruppeM Racing	Mercedes-Benz	18	+27.170
10	G	31	Kelvin van der Linde (ZAF)	(Germany) Audi Sport Team Rutronik	Audi	18	+28.585
11	S	97	Roelof Bruins (KOR)	(South Korea) Solite Indigo Racing	Mercedes-Benz	18	+36.577
12	S	10	Charles Weerts (BEL)	(Belgium) Team WRT	Audi	18	+1:08.732
13	S	66	Weian Chen (CHN)	(China) Audi Sport Asia Team TSRT	Audi	16	+2 Laps
Ret	S	88	Alessio Picariello (BEL)	(Hong Kong) Mercedes-AMG Team Craft-Bamboo Racing	Mercedes-Benz	10	Retired
Ret	P	912	Kévin Estre (FRA)	(China) Absolute Racing	Porsche	4	Retired
Ret	G	911	Alexandre Imperatori (CHE)	(China) Absolute Racing	Porsche	4	Retired
Ret	S	7	Adderly Fong (HKG)	(China) Zun Motorsport Crew	Mercedes-Benz	1	Retired

== See also ==
- 2019 Macau Grand Prix
