= 2023 Indianapolis 8 Hours =

Indianapolis 8 Hours (5–8 October 2023)

(United States) 2023 Indianapolis 8 Hours
Event Information
- Round 4 of 5 in the 2023 Intercontinental GT Challenge
- Date: 8 October 2023 Intercontinental GT Challenge
- Location: Speedway, Indiana, United States
- Venue: Indianapolis Motor Speedway

Results
Race 1
Distance	332 laps	809.71 miles (1,303.10 km) km
Pole position	(Germany) No. 20 Huber Motorsports (driver for session: (Germany) Laurin Heinrich); Huber Motorsports	1:22.707
Winner	(Austria) Philipp Eng (South Africa) Sheldon van der Linde (Belgium) Dries Vanthoor (Belgium) Team WRT	8:00:05.921

The 2023 Indianapolis 8 Hours (also known as the Indianapolis 8 Hour Presented by AWS for sponsorship reasons) was the fourth running of the Indianapolis 8 Hour. It took place from October 5–8, 2023. The race was the fourth round of the 2023 Intercontinental GT Challenge and the seventh and final round 2023 GT World Challenge America championships.

== Background ==
The 2023 edition was open only to cars within GT3 regulations. GT4 cars, which had appeared in the first two races, were dropped from the race in an effort to reduce incidents caused by multi-class racing.

Supporting the race weekend were the Pirelli GT4 America Series, the TC America Series, and the GT America Series.

== Entry list ==
No.	Entrant	Car	Class	Driver 1	Driver 2	Driver 3
04	(United States) Crowdstrike with Riley Motorsports	Mercedes-AMG GT3 Evo	PA	(United States) Colin Braun	(United States) Nolan Siegel	(United States) George Kurtz
007	(United States) TRG-AMR	Aston Martin Vantage AMR GT3	PA	(United States) Derek DeBoer	(France) Valentin Hasse-Clot	(United Kingdom) Ben Tuck
08	(United States) DXDT Racing	Mercedes-AMG GT3 Evo	PA	(United States) Bryan Sellers	(United States) Scott Smithson	(Australia) Tom Sargent
4	(Australia) Grove Racing	Porsche 911 GT3 R	PA	(Australia) Brenton Grove	(Australia) Stephen Grove	(New Zealand) Earl Bamber
20	(Germany) Huber Motorsport	Porsche 911 GT3 R (992)	PA	(Hong Kong) Antares Au	(Germany) Laurin Heinrich	(Germany) Alfred Renauer
21	(United States) Conquest Racing	Ferrari 296 GT3	P	(Italy) Alessandro Balzan	(United States) Manny Franco	(France) Lilou Wadoux
27	(United States) TR3 Racing	Mercedes-AMG GT3 Evo	PA	(United Kingdom) Matt Bell	(United States) Jon Branam	(United States) Kenton Koch
28	(United States) RennSport1 - CBW Racing	Porsche 911 GT3 R (992)	P	(United States) Eric Filgueiras	(Scotland) Stevan McAleer	(Austria) Klaus Bachler
30	(Belgium) Team WRT	BMW M4 GT3	P	(Austria) Philipp Eng	(South Africa) Sheldon van der Linde	(Belgium) Dries Vanthoor
31	(Belgium) Team WRT	BMW M4 GT3	P	(Brazil) Augusto Farfus	(Belgium) Maxime Martin	(Belgium) Charles Weerts
33	(United States) Triarsi Competizione	Ferrari 296 GT3	PA	(Scotland) Ryan Dalziel	(United States) Justin Wetherill	(United States) Onofrio Triarsi
38	(Canada) ST Racing	BMW M4 GT3	PA	(Canada) Samantha Tan	(United States) Neil Verhagen	(United States) Jake Walker
45	(United States) Wright Motorsports	Porsche 911 GT3 R (992)	P	(Belgium) Jan Heylen	(United States) Madison Snow	(United States) Trent Hindman
53	(United States) MDK Motorsports	Porsche 911 GT3 R (992)	P	(United States) Trenton Estep	(United States) Seth Lucas	(Italy) Matteo Cairoli
77	(Hong Kong) Mercedes-AMG Team Craft-Bamboo Racing	Mercedes-AMG GT3 Evo	P	(Germany) Maximilian Götz	(Andorra) Jules Gounon	(Switzerland) Raffaele Marciello
85	(United States) Rearden Racing	Porsche 911 GT3 R (992)	P	(Germany) Christian Engelhart	(Bulgaria) Vesko Kozarov	(United States) Jake Pedersen
91	(United States) DXDT Racing	Mercedes-AMG GT3 Evo	PA	(United States) Jeff Burton	(United States) Corey Lewis	(Switzerland) Philip Ellis
93	(United States) Racers Edge Motorsports with WTR-Andretti	Acura NSX GT3 Evo22	P	(Germany) Mario Farnbacher	(United States) Ashton Harrison	(Canada) Kyle Marcelli
94	(United States) Bimmerworld Racing	BMW M4 GT3	P	(United States) Bill Auberlen	(United States) Chandler Hull	(United States) Robby Foley
120	(United States) Wright Motorsports	Porsche 911 GT3 R (992)	PA	(United States) Adam Adelson	(United States) Elliot Skeer	(United Kingdom) Callum Ilott
535	(United Kingdom) Sky – Tempesta Racing	Ferrari 488 GT3 Evo 2020	PA	(Italy) Eddie Cheever III	(United Kingdom) Chris Froggatt	(Hong Kong) Jonathan Hui
999	(Hong Kong) Team GruppeM Racing	Mercedes-AMG GT3 Evo	P	(Germany) Maro Engel	(Spain) Daniel Juncadella	(Germany) Luca Stolz

Icon	Class
P	Pro Cup
PA	Pro/Am Cup

== Race result ==
Class winners denoted with bold and ‡.

Pos.	Class	No.	Team / Entrant	Drivers	Car	Laps	Time/Retired
1	Pro	30	(Belgium) Team WRT	(Austria) Philipp Eng (South Africa) Sheldon van der Linde (Belgium) Dries Vanthoor	BMW M4 GT3	332	8:00:05.921‡
2	Pro	77	(Hong Kong) Mercedes-AMG Team Craft-Bamboo Racing	(Germany) Maximilian Götz (Switzerland) Raffaele Marciello (Andorra) Jules Gounon	Mercedes-AMG GT3 Evo	332	+53.110
3	Pro	999	(Hong Kong) Team GruppeM Racing	(Germany) Maro Engel (Spain) Daniel Juncadella (Germany) Luca Stolz	Mercedes-AMG GT3 Evo	332	+53.640
4	Pro	45	(United States) Wright Motorsports	(United States) Madison Snow (Belgium) Jan Heylen (United States) Trent Hindman	Porsche 911 GT3 R (992)	330	+2 Laps
5	Pro	28	(United States) RennSport1 - CBW Racing	(United States) Eric Filgueiras (Scotland) Stevan McAleer (Austria) Klaus Bachler	Porsche 911 GT3 R (992)	329	+3 Laps
6	Pro-Am	04	(United States) Crowdstrike with Riley Motorsports	(United States) Colin Braun (United States) Nolan Siegel (United States) George Kurtz	Mercedes-AMG GT3 Evo	329	+3 Laps‡
7	Pro-Am	20	(Germany) Huber Motorsport	(Hong Kong) Antares Au (Germany) Laurin Heinrich (Germany) Alfred Renauer	Porsche 911 GT3 R (992)	328	+4 Laps
8	Pro	53	(United States) MDK Motorsports	(United States) Trenton Estep (United States) Seth Lucas (Italy) Matteo Cairoli	Porsche 911 GT3 R (992)	328	+4 Laps
9	Pro-Am	27	(United States) TR3 Racing	(United Kingdom) Matt Bell (United States) Jon Branam (United States) Kenton Koch	Mercedes-AMG GT3 Evo	328	+4 Laps
10	Pro-Am	535	(United Kingdom) Sky – Tempesta Racing	(Italy) Eddie Cheever III (United Kingdom) Chris Froggatt (Hong Kong) Jonathan Hui	Ferrari 488 GT3 Evo 2020	327	+5 Laps
11	Pro-Am	120	(United States) Wright Motorsports	(United States) Adam Adelson (United States) Elliott Skeer (United Kingdom) Callum Ilott	Porsche 911 GT3 R (992)	327	+5 Laps
12	Pro-Am	38	(Canada) ST Racing	(United States) Neil Verhagen (Canada) Samantha Tan (United States) Jake Walker	BMW M4 GT3	327	+5 Laps
13	Pro-Am	007	(United States) TRG-AMR	(United States) Derek DeBoer (France) Valentin Hasse-Clot (United Kingdom) Ben Tuck	Aston Martin Vantage AMR GT3	326	+6 Laps
14	Pro	93	(United States) Racers Edge Motorsports	(Germany) Mario Farnbacher (United States) Ashton Harrison (Canada) Kyle Marcelli	Acura NSX GT3 Evo22	325	+7 Laps
15	Pro-Am	4	(Australia) Grove Racing	(New Zealand) Earl Bamber (Australia) Brenton Grove (Australia) Stephen Grove	Porsche 911 GT3 R (992)	324	+8 Laps
16	Pro	85	(United States) Rearden Racing	(Germany) Christian Engelhart (Bulgaria) Vesko Kozarov (United States) Jake Pedersen	Porsche 911 GT3 R (992)	322	+10 Laps
17	Pro	31	(Belgium) Team WRT	(Brazil) Augusto Farfus (Belgium) Maxime Martin (Belgium) Charles Weerts	BMW M4 GT3	321	+11 Laps
18	Pro-Am	33	(United States) Triarsi Competizione	(Scotland) Ryan Dalziel (United States) Onofrio Triarsi (United States) Justin Wetherill	Ferrari 296 GT3	317	+15 Laps
19	Pro	21	(United States) Conquest Racing	(Italy) Alessandro Balzan (United States) Manny Franco (France) Lilou Wadoux	Ferrari 296 GT3	311	+21 Laps
20	Pro	94	(United States) Bimmerworld Racing	(United States) Bill Auberlen (United States) Chandler Hull (United States) Richard Heistand	BMW M4 GT3	309	Retired
21	Pro-Am	08	(United States) DXDT Racing	(United States) Bryan Sellers (United States) Scott Smithson (Australia) Tom Sargent	Mercedes-AMG GT3 Evo	285	Suspension
NC	Pro-Am	91	(United States) DXDT Racing	(United States) Jeff Burton (United States) Corey Lewis (Switzerland) Philip Ellis	Mercedes-AMG GT3 Evo	65	Driveline

Intercontinental GT Challenge
Previous race: 2023 24 Hours of Spa	2023 season	Next race: 2023 Gulf 12 Hours
