= 2023 Gulf 12 Hours =

13th Gulf 12 Hours endurance race

Race details
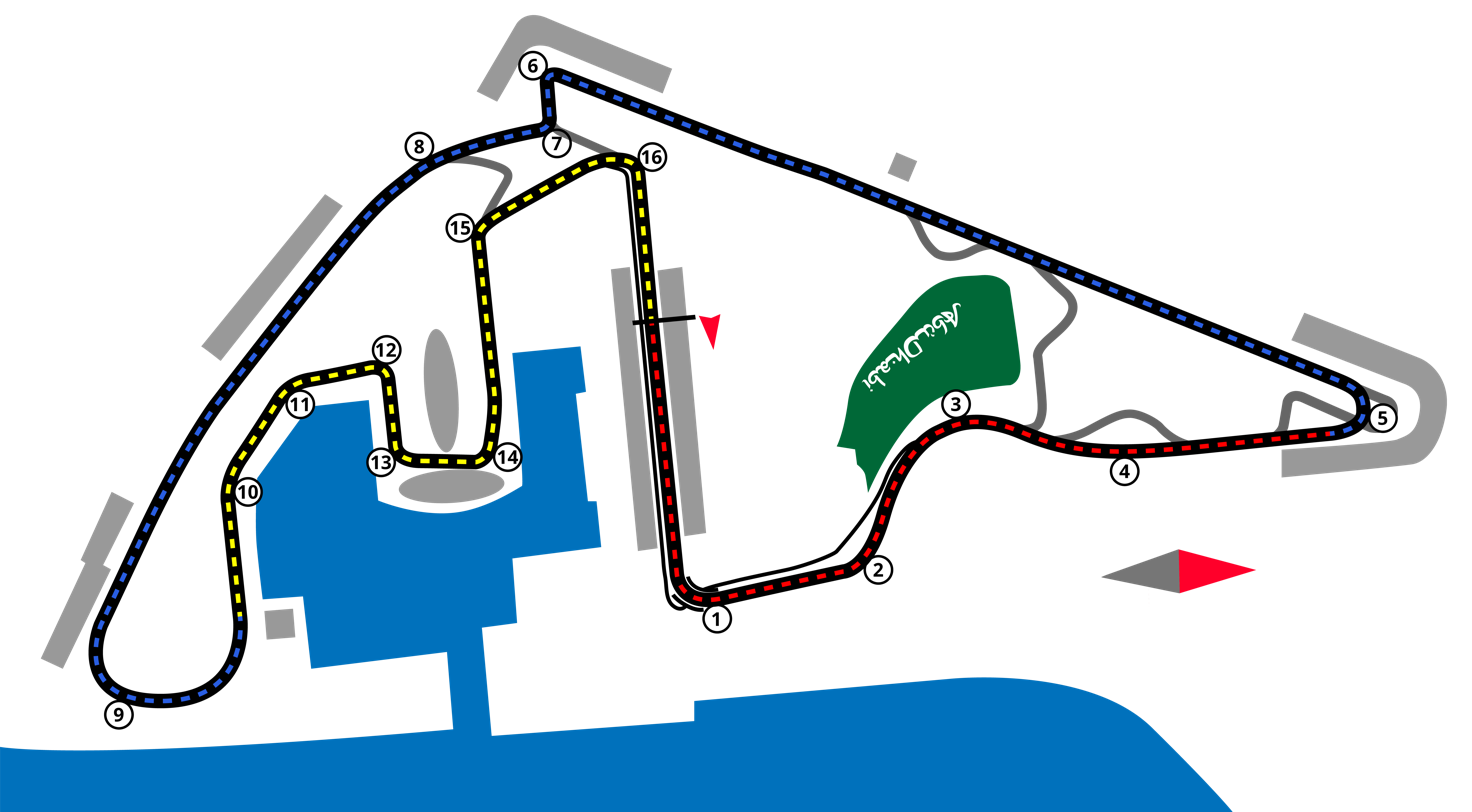
Date	10 December 2023
Official name	Lenovo Gulf 12 Hours
Location	Yas Island, Abu Dhabi, UAE
Course	Permanent circuit 5.281 km (3.281 mi)
Distance	Race; 12 hours
- Qualifying

Pole
Drivers	(Germany) Maro Engel (Canada) Mikaël Grenier (Germany) Luca Stolz	Mercedes-AMG Team GruppeM Racing
Avg Time	1:51.272
- Race

Fastest lap
Driver	(Germany) Maro Engel	Mercedes-AMG Team GruppeM Racing
Time	1:51.291 (on lap 4)

Podium
First	(Germany) Maro Engel (Canada) Mikaël Grenier (Germany) Luca Stolz	Mercedes-AMG Team GruppeM Racing
Second	(Italy) Valentino Rossi (Belgium) Dries Vanthoor (United Kingdom) Nick Yelloly	Team WRT
Third	(Germany) Maximilian Götz (Andorra) Jules Gounon (Germany) Fabian Schiller	Mercedes-AMG Team 2 Seas

The 2023 Gulf 12 Hours (officially titled 2023 Lenovo Gulf 12 Hours) was the 13th edition of the Gulf 12 Hours, and was held at Yas Marina Circuit on 8–10 December 2023. The race was contested with GT3-spec cars. It was the final round of the 2023 Intercontinental GT Challenge.

== Entry list ==
No.	Entrant	Car	Driver 1	Driver 2	Driver 3	Driver 4
GT3 Pro (5 entries)
14	(Bahrain) Mercedes-AMG Team 2 Seas	Mercedes-AMG GT3 Evo	(Germany) Maximilian Götz	(Andorra) Jules Gounon	(Germany) Fabian Schiller	-
32	(Belgium) Team WRT	BMW M4 GT3	(Austria) Philipp Eng	(South Africa) Sheldon van der Linde	(Belgium) Charles Weerts	-
46	(Belgium) Team WRT	BMW M4 GT3	(Italy) Valentino Rossi	(Belgium) Dries Vanthoor	(United Kingdom) Nick Yelloly	-
77	(Hong Kong) Mercedes-AMG Team GruppeM Racing	Mercedes-AMG GT3 Evo	(Austria) Lucas Auer	(United Kingdom) Frank Bird	(Italy) Lorenzo Ferrari	-
99	(Hong Kong) Mercedes-AMG Team GruppeM Racing	Mercedes-AMG GT3 Evo	(Germany) Maro Engel	(Canada) Mikaël Grenier	(Germany) Luca Stolz	-
GT3 Pro-Am (12 entries)
4	(Australia) Grove Racing	Porsche 911 GT3 R (992)	(Australia) Brenton Grove	(Australia) Stephen Grove	(New Zealand) Richie Stanaway	-
11	(Switzerland) Kessel Racing	Ferrari 296 GT3	(Australia) Scott Andrews	(Italy) David Fumanelli	(United States) Anton Dias Perera	(Italy) Giorgio Roda
12	(Switzerland) Centri Porsche Ticino	Porsche 911 GT3 R (992)	(Italy) Stefano Costantini	(Switzerland) Alex Fontana	(Switzerland) Yannick Mettler	(United States) Hash Patel
25	(Italy) AF Corse	Ferrari 296 GT3	(Italy) Alessandro Cozzi	(Italy) Marco Pulcini	(Italy) Alessio Rovera	(Italy) Giorgio Sernagiotto
26	(United Arab Emirates) OJ Lifestyle Racing by Racing One	Ferrari 296 GT3	(Canada) Ramez Azzam	(United Kingdom) Omar Jackson	(India) Zaamin Jaffer	(Zimbabwe) Axcil Jefferies
27	(United Kingdom) Optimum Motorsport	McLaren 720S GT3 Evo	(United Kingdom) Rob Bell	(United Kingdom) Ollie Millroy	(United Kingdom) Mark Radcliffe	-
33	(Germany) Herberth Motorsport	Porsche 911 GT3 R (992)	(Hong Kong) Antares Au	(Italy) Matteo Cairoli	(Germany) Tim Heinemann	-
59	(United Kingdom) Garage 59	McLaren 720S GT3 Evo	(United Kingdom) Shaun Balfe	(Germany) Benjamin Goethe	(Germany) Oliver Goethe	(United Kingdom) Mark Sansom
74	(Switzerland) Kessel Racing	Ferrari 296 GT3	(Poland) Michael Broniszewski	(Italy) Davide Rigon	(Italy) Niccolò Schirò	-
75	(Australia) SunEnergy1 Racing	Mercedes-AMG GT3 Evo	(Austria) Dominik Baumann	(Switzerland) Philip Ellis	(Australia) Kenny Habul	(Austria) Martin Konrad
88	(United Kingdom) Garage 59	McLaren 720S GT3 Evo	(Germany) Marvin Kirchhöfer	(Monaco) Louis Prette	(Sweden) Alexander West	-
93	(United Kingdom) Sky – Tempesta Racing	McLaren 720S GT3 Evo	(Italy) Eddie Cheever III	(United Kingdom) Chris Froggatt	(Hong Kong) Jonathan Hui	(Macau) Kevin Tse
GT3 Am (11 entries)
2	(Antigua and Barbuda) HAAS RT	Audi R8 LMS Evo II	(France) Grégory Guilvert	(Belgium) Xavier Knauf	(Finland) Miika Panu	(Belgium) Grégory Servais
3	(Bahrain) 2 Seas Motorsport	Mercedes-AMG GT3 Evo	(Bahrain) Isa Al Khalifa	(United Kingdom) Ian Loggie	(Oman) Al Faisal Al Zubair	-
7	(Germany) Herberth Motorsport	Porsche 911 GT3 R (992)	(Switzerland) Daniel Allemann	(Germany) Ralf Bohn	(Germany) Alfred Renauer	-
20	(Italy) AF Corse	Ferrari 296 GT3	(Italy) Christian Colombo	(Belgium) Stéphane Lémeret	(Indonesia) David Tjiptobiantoro	(France) Lilou Wadoux
21	(Germany) Car Collection Motorsport	Porsche 911 GT3 R (992)	(United States) Dustin Blattner	(Germany) Constantin Dressler	(Germany) Joel Sturm	-
51	(Italy) AF Corse	Ferrari 488 GT3 Evo 2020	(Greece) Kriton Lendoudis	(Italy) Nicola Marinangeli	(Switzerland) Christoph Ulrich	(France) Alex Fox
61	(Italy) AF Corse	Ferrari 296 GT3	(United States) Conrad Grunewald	(Belgium) Laurent de Meeus	(Portugal) Miguel Ramos	(United States) Jean Claude Saada
73	(Italy) MP Racing	Mercedes-AMG GT3 Evo	(Italy) Corinna Gostner	(Italy) David Gostner	(Italy) Manuela Gostner	(Italy) Thomas Gostner
76	(United Kingdom) 7TSIX	Mercedes-AMG GT3 Evo	(United Kingdom) Tom Jackson	(United Kingdom) Wayne Marrs	(Zimbabwe) Ameerh Naran	(United Kingdom) Matt Topham
79	(Ukraine) Tsunami RT	Porsche 911 GT3 R (992)	(Italy) Stefano Borghi	(Italy) Marco Cassará	(Italy) Davide Scannicchio	(Italy) Johannes Zelger
86	(Austria) Baron Motorsport	Ferrari 488 GT3 Evo 2020	(Italy) Daniele di Amato	(Austria) Ernst Kirchmayr	(Monaco) Philippe Prette	(Germany) Axel Sartingen

== Qualifying ==
=== Qualifying results ===
Fastest times for each car are denoted in bold.
Pole positions in each class are denoted in bold.

Pos.	Class	No.	Team	Car	Avg. Time	Driver 1	Driver 2	Driver 3	Driver 4
1	P	**99**	**(Hong Kong) Mercedes-AMG Team GruppeM Racing**	**Mercedes-AMG GT3 Evo**	**1:51.272**	**1:51.075**	1:51.364	1:51.378	
2	P	14	(Bahrain) Mercedes-AMG Team 2 Seas	Mercedes-AMG GT3 Evo	1:51.504	1:51.733	**1:51.106**	1:51.675	
3	PA	**33**	**(Germany) Herberth Motorsport**	**Porsche 911 GT3 R (992)**	**1:51.731**	**1:50.592**	1:51.187	1:53.414	
4	P	46	(Belgium) Team WRT	BMW M4 GT3	1:51.756	1:52.259	1:51.614	**1:51.396**	
5	P	77	(Hong Kong) Mercedes-AMG Team GruppeM Racing	Mercedes-AMG GT3 Evo	1:51.762	1:52.082	1:51.806	**1:51.400**	
6	PA	88	(United Kingdom) Garage 59	McLaren 720S GT3 Evo	1:51.911	**1:51.162**	1:53.212	1:51.361	
7	PA	27	(United Kingdom) Optimum Motorsport	McLaren 720S GT3 Evo	1:52.021	1:51.769	1:52.885	**1:51.409**	
8	P	32	(Belgium) Team WRT	BMW M4 GT3	1:52.025	1:52.347	1:52.030	**1:51.699**	
9	Am	**21**	**(Germany) Car Collection Motorsport**	**Porsche 911 GT3 R (992)**	**1:52.173**	1:52.284	1:53.036	**1:51.199**	
10	PA	59	(United Kingdom) Garage 59	McLaren 720S GT3 Evo	1:52.255	1:51.426	**1:50.549**	1:52.768	1:54.279
11	PA	11	(Switzerland) Kessel Racing	Ferrari 296 GT3	1:52.442	**1:50.705**	1:51.981	1:51.324	1:55.760
12	Am	7	(Germany) Herberth Motorsport	Porsche 911 GT3 R (992)	1:52.615	**1:51.254**	1:52.226	1:54.367	
13	PA	75	(Australia) SunEnergy1 Racing	Mercedes-AMG GT3 Evo	1:52.637	1:53.115	1:53.919	**1:51.726**	1:51.789
14	PA	93	(United Kingdom) Sky – Tempesta Racing	McLaren 720S GT3 Evo	1:52.657	1:52.843	1:52.725	1:53.521	**1:51.540**
15	PA	26	(United Arab Emirates) OJ Lifestyle Racing by Racing One	Ferrari 296 GT3	1:53.040	1:51.728	1:55.357	1:53.706	**1:51.370**
16	PA	4	(Australia) Grove Racing	Porsche 911 GT3 R (992)	1:53.187	**1:51.550**	1:52.221	1:55.792	
17	Am	3	(Bahrain) 2 Seas Motorsport	Mercedes-AMG GT3 Evo	1:53.208	1:54.406	1:52.991	**1:52.227**	
18	PA	25	(Italy) AF Corse	Ferrari 296 GT3	1:53.271	1:54.460	1:51.477	1:56.413	**1:50.734**
19	Am	2	(Antigua and Barbuda) HAAS RT	Audi R8 LMS Evo II	1:53.570	1:52.848	1:52.698	**1:52.641**	1:56.093
20	Am	61	(Italy) AF Corse	Ferrari 296 GT3	1:53.796	**1:51.693**	1:53.118	1:54.778	1:55.597
21	Am	20	(Italy) AF Corse	Ferrari 296 GT3	1:53.853	1:52.463	1:53.602	**1:51.878**	1:57.471
22	Am	51	(Italy) AF Corse	Ferrari 488 GT3 Evo 2020	1:55.160	**1:51.822**	1:53.842	1:55.998	1:58.979
23	Am	79	(Ukraine) Tsunami RT	Porsche 911 GT3 R (992)	1:55.529	**1:54.521**	1:55.018	1:57.059	1:55.519
24	PA	12	(Switzerland) Centri Porsche Ticino	Porsche 911 GT3 R (992)	1:57.150				**1:57.150**
25	Am	76	(United Kingdom) 7TSIX	Mercedes-AMG GT3 Evo	1:57.512		**1:55.165**	1:59.544	1:57.829
26	Am	73	(Italy) MP Racing	Mercedes-AMG GT3 Evo	1:57.750	**1:55.305**	1:56.017	2:01.835	1:57.844
WD	PA	74	(Switzerland) Kessel Racing	Ferrari 296 GT3					
WD	Am	86	(Austria) Baron Motorsport	Ferrari 488 GT3 Evo 2020					

== Race ==
=== Race classification ===
Class winners denoted in bold.

Pos.	Class	#	Team	Drivers	Car	Laps	Time/Gap/Retired
1	P	**99**	**(Hong Kong) Mercedes-AMG Team GruppeM Racing**	**(Germany) Maro Engel** **(Canada) Mikaël Grenier** **(Germany) Luca Stolz**	**Mercedes-AMG GT3 Evo**	**348**	**12:01:18.056**
2	P	46	(Belgium) Team WRT	(Italy) Valentino Rossi (Belgium) Dries Vanthoor (United Kingdom) Nick Yelloly	BMW M4 GT3	348	+12.811
3	P	14	(Bahrain) Mercedes-AMG Team 2 Seas	(Germany) Maximilian Götz (Andorra) Jules Gounon (Germany) Fabian Schiller	Mercedes-AMG GT3 Evo	347	+1 Lap
4	P	77	(Hong Kong) Mercedes-AMG Team GruppeM Racing	(Austria) Lucas Auer (United Kingdom) Frank Bird (Italy) Lorenzo Ferrari	Mercedes-AMG GT3 Evo	346	+2 Laps
5	Am	**21**	**(Germany) Car Collection Motorsport**	**(United States) Dustin Blattner** **(Germany) Constantin Dressler** **(Germany) Joel Sturm**	**Porsche 911 GT3 R (992)**	**346**	**+2 Laps**
6	PA	**27**	**(United Kingdom) Optimum Motorsport**	**(United Kingdom) Rob Bell** **(United Kingdom) Ollie Millroy** **(United Kingdom) Mark Radcliffe**	**McLaren 720S GT3 Evo**	**345**	**+3 Laps**
7	PA	11	(Switzerland) Kessel Racing	(Australia) Scott Andrews (Italy) David Fumanelli (United States) Anton Dias Perera (Italy) Giorgio Roda	Ferrari 296 GT3	344	+4 Laps
8	PA	33	(Germany) Herberth Motorsport	(Hong Kong) Antares Au (Italy) Matteo Cairoli (Germany) Tim Heinemann	Porsche 911 GT3 R (992)	343	+5 Laps
9	Am	3	(Bahrain) 2 Seas Motorsport	(Bahrain) Isa Al Khalifa (United Kingdom) Ian Loggie (Oman) Al Faisal Al Zubair	Mercedes-AMG GT3 Evo	343	+5 Laps
10	Am	7	(Germany) Herberth Motorsport	(Switzerland) Daniel Allemann (Germany) Ralf Bohn (Germany) Alfred Renauer	Porsche 911 GT3 R (992)	343	+5 Laps
11	PA	25	(Italy) AF Corse	(Italy) Alessandro Cozzi (Italy) Marco Pulcini (Italy) Alessio Rovera (Italy) Giorgio Sernagiotto	Ferrari 296 GT3	343	+5 Laps
12	PA	88	(United Kingdom) Garage 59	(Germany) Marvin Kirchhöfer (Monaco) Louis Prette (Sweden) Alexander West	McLaren 720S GT3 Evo	342	+6 Laps
13	PA	93	(United Kingdom) Sky – Tempesta Racing	(Italy) Eddie Cheever III (United Kingdom) Chris Froggatt (Hong Kong) Jonathan Hui (Macau) Kevin Tse	McLaren 720S GT3 Evo	342	+6 Laps
14	P	32	(Belgium) Team WRT	(Austria) Philipp Eng (South Africa) Sheldon van der Linde (Belgium) Charles Weerts	BMW M4 GT3	342	+6 Laps
15	Am	20	(Italy) AF Corse	(Italy) Christian Colombo (Belgium) Stéphane Lémeret (Indonesia) David Tjiptobiantoro (France) Lilou Wadoux	Ferrari 296 GT3	340	+8 Laps
16	PA	75	(Australia) SunEnergy1 Racing	(Austria) Dominik Baumann (Switzerland) Philip Ellis (Australia) Kenny Habul (Austria) Martin Konrad	Mercedes-AMG GT3 Evo	338	+10 Laps
17	Am	2	(Antigua and Barbuda) HAAS RT	(France) Grégory Guilvert (Belgium) Xavier Knauf (Finland) Miika Panu (Belgium) Grégory Servais	Audi R8 LMS Evo II	330	+18 Laps
18	Am	73	(Italy) MP Racing	(Italy) Corinna Gostner (Italy) David Gostner (Italy) Manuela Gostner (Italy) Thomas Gostner	Mercedes-AMG GT3 Evo	308	+40 Laps
19	Am	61	(Italy) AF Corse	(United States) Conrad Grunewald (Belgium) Laurent de Meeus (Portugal) Miguel Ramos (United States) Jean Claude Saada	Ferrari 296 GT3	304	+44 Laps
20	PA	26	(United Arab Emirates) OJ Lifestyle Racing by Racing One	(Canada) Ramez Azzam (United Kingdom) Omar Jackson (India) Zaamin Jaffer (Zimbabwe) Axcil Jefferies	Ferrari 296 GT3	291	+57 Laps
21	Am	51	(Italy) AF Corse	(Greece) Kriton Lendoudis (Italy) Nicola Marinangeli (Switzerland) Christoph Ulrich (France) Alex Fox	Ferrari 488 GT3 Evo 2020	244	+104 Laps
22	Am	79	(Ukraine) Tsunami RT	(Italy) Stefano Borghi (Italy) Marco Cassará (Italy) Davide Scannicchio (Italy) Johannes Zelger	Porsche 911 GT3 R (992)	199	+149 Laps
23	PA	4	(Australia) Grove Racing	(Australia) Brenton Grove (Australia) Stephen Grove (New Zealand) Richie Stanaway	Porsche 911 GT3 R (992)	34	+314 Laps
24	PA	59	(United Kingdom) Garage 59	(United Kingdom) Shaun Balfe (Germany) Benjamin Goethe (Germany) Oliver Goethe (United Kingdom) Mark Sansom	McLaren 720S GT3 Evo	24	+324 Laps
DNS	PA	12	(Switzerland) Centri Porsche Ticino	(Italy) Stefano Costantini (Switzerland) Alex Fontana (Switzerland) Yannick Mettler (United States) Hash Patel	Porsche 911 GT3 R (992)		Qualifying crash
DNS	Am	76	(United Kingdom) 7TSIX	(United Kingdom) Tom Jackson (United Kingdom) Wayne Marrs (Zimbabwe) Ameerh Naran (United Kingdom) Matt Topham	Mercedes-AMG GT3 Evo		Qualifying crash

== Notes ==
Intercontinental GT Challenge
Previous race: 2023 Indianapolis 8 Hours	2023 season	Next race: 2024 Bathurst 12 Hour
