= 2023 Kyalami 9 Hours =

Endurance race in Gauteng, S. Africa

(South Africa) 2023 Kyalami 9 Hours
Event Information
- Round 2 of 5 in the 2023 Intercontinental GT Challenge
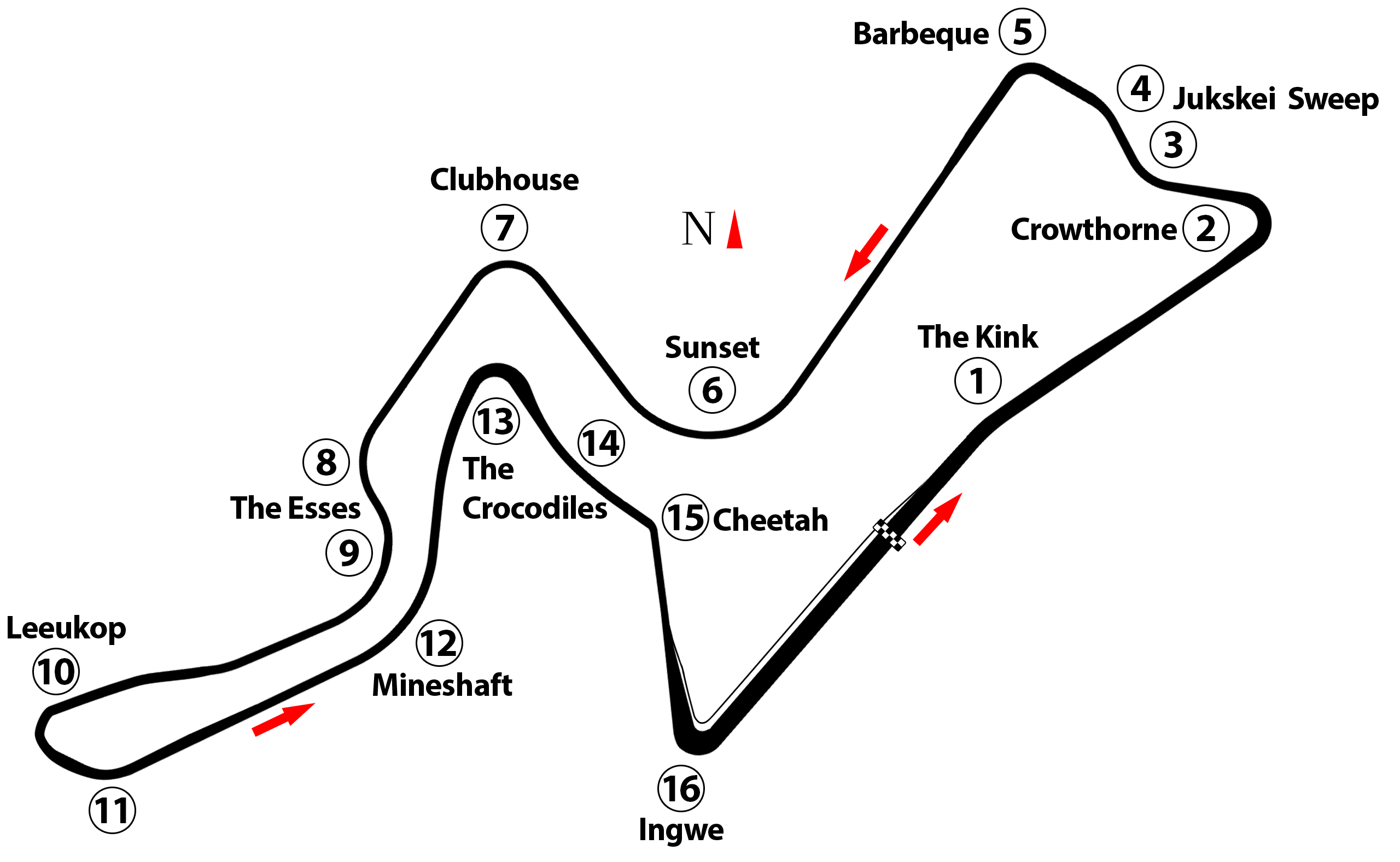
- Date: 23–25 February 2023 Intercontinental GT Challenge
- Location: Midrand, Gauteng, South Africa
- Venue: Kyalami Grand Prix Circuit

Results
Race 1
Distance	306 laps	1385.874 km
Pole position	(Germany) Maro Engel (Canada) Mikaël Grenier (Italy) Raffaele Marciello; GruppeM Racing	1:42.617
Winner	(South Africa) Sheldon van der Linde (Belgium) Dries Vanthoor (Belgium) Charles Weerts; Team WRT	9:00:56.286

The 2023 Kyalami 9 Hours (commercially titled 2023 Joburg Kyalami 9 Hours) was an endurance event that took place on 25 February 2023 at the Kyalami Grand Prix Circuit in Midrand, South Africa. The event was the second round of five in the 2023 Intercontinental GT Challenge.

== Results ==
=== Qualifying ===
Pos.	No.	Class	Driver	Team	Car	Individual Times	Aggregate Time	Gap
Intercontinental GT Challenge
1	999	P	(Germany) Maro Engel (Canada) Mikaël Grenier (Italy) Raffaele Marciello	(Hong Kong) GruppeM Racing	Mercedes-AMG GT3 Evo	1:43.167; 1:42.657; 1:42.029	1:42.617	
2	32	P	(Belgium) Dries Vanthoor (South Africa) Sheldon van der Linde (Belgium) Charles Weerts	(Belgium) Team WRT	BMW M4 GT3	1:43.299; 1:42.759; 1:42.768	1:42.942	+0.325
3	33	P	(Austria) Philipp Eng (Brazil) Augusto Farfus Jr. (Belgium) Maxime Martin	(Belgium) Team WRT	BMW M4 GT3	1:43.492; 1:42.834; 1:42.586	1:42.970	+0.353
4	66	P	(Italy) Mattia Drudi (Switzerland) Ricardo Feller (Switzerland) Patric Niederhauser	(Germany) Attempto Racing	Audi R8 LMS Evo2	1:43.383; 1:43.019; 1:42.681	1:43.027	+0.410
5	99	P	(Germany) Markus Winkelhock (Germany) Dennis Marschall (Germany) Alex Aka	(Germany) Attempto Racing	Audi R8 LMS Evo2	1:43.817; 1:42.804; 1:42.946	1:43.189	+0.572
6	75	PA	(Switzerland) Yannick Mettler (Australia) Kenny Habul (France) Jules Gounon	(Australia) SunEnergy1 Racing (Germany) SPS Automotive Performance	Mercedes-AMG GT3 Evo	1:43.519; 1:44.444; 1:42.470	1:43.477	+0.860
7	4	PA	(Australia) Stephen Grove (Australia) Brenton Grove (New Zealand) Earl Bamber	(Australia) Grove Racing	Porsche 911 GT3 R	1:46.166; 1:43.823; 1:42.347	1:44.112	+1.495
8	20	PA	(Germany) Luca Stolz (United Kingdom) Reece Barr (Portugal) Miguel Ramos	(Germany) SPS Automotive Performance	Mercedes-AMG GT3 Evo	1:43.655; 1:44.351; 1:44.904	1:44.303	+1.686
9	86	PA	(South Africa) Charl Arangies (South Africa) Arnold Neveling (South Africa) Clint Weston	(South Africa) Stradale Motorsport	Mercedes-AMG GT3	1:46.489; 1:45.187; 1:46.181	1:45.952	+2.335
10	80	PA	(South Africa) Kwanda Mokoena (South Africa) Mo Mia (South Africa) Marius Jackson	(South Africa) MJR Motorsport	Audi R8 LMS Evo2	No time 1:53.179; 1:54.477	1:53.828	+11.211
National Cup
1	3	GT3	(South Africa) Mikaël Pitamber	(South Africa) Pablo Clark Racing	Mercedes-AMG GT3	1:45.103		+2.486
2	11	GT3	(South Africa) Sunthrasagaran Moodley	(South Africa) BigFoot Express Racing	Mercedes-AMG GT3	1:54.118		+11.501
3	51	GT4	(South Africa) Joseph Ellerine	(South Africa) MJR Motorsport	Audi R8 LMS GT4	1:59.470		+16.853

=== Race ===
Pos.	Class	No.	Team	Drivers	Car	Laps	Time / Retired
1	32	P	(Belgium) Dries Vanthoor (South Africa) Sheldon van der Linde (Belgium) Charles Weerts	(Belgium) Team WRT	BMW M4 GT3	306	9:00:56.286
2	33	P	(Austria) Philipp Eng (Brazil) Augusto Farfus Jr. (Belgium) Maxime Martin	(Belgium) Team WRT	BMW M4 GT3	306	+1.778
3	66	P	(Italy) Mattia Drudi (Switzerland) Ricardo Feller (Switzerland) Patric Niederhauser	(Germany) Attempto Racing	Audi R8 LMS Evo2	306	+3.052
4	99	P	(Germany) Markus Winkelhock (Germany) Dennis Marschall (Germany) Alex Aka	(Germany) Attempto Racing	Audi R8 LMS Evo2	305	+1 lap
5	75	PA	(Switzerland) Yannick Mettler (Australia) Kenny Habul (France) Jules Gounon	(Australia) SunEnergy1 Racing (Germany) SPS Automotive Performance	Mercedes-AMG GT3 Evo	304	+2 laps
6	4	PA	(Australia) Stephen Grove (Australia) Brenton Grove (New Zealand) Earl Bamber	(Australia) Grove Racing	Porsche 911 GT3 R	302	+4 laps
7	20	PA	(Germany) Luca Stolz (United Kingdom) Reece Barr (Portugal) Miguel Ramos	(Germany) SPS Automotive Performance	Mercedes-AMG GT3 Evo	302	+4 laps
8	86	PA	(South Africa) Charl Arangies (South Africa) Arnold Neveling (South Africa) Clint Weston	(South Africa) Stradale Motorsport	Mercedes-AMG GT3	280	+26 laps
9	999	P	(Germany) Maro Engel (Canada) Mikaël Grenier (Italy) Raffaele Marciello	(Hong Kong) GruppeM Racing	Mercedes-AMG GT3 Evo	244	+62 laps
DNF	80	PA	(South Africa) Kwanda Mokoena (South Africa) Mo Mia (South Africa) Marius Jackson	(South Africa) MJR Motorsport	Audi R8 LMS Evo2	183	Master cylinder
DNF	3	GT3	(South Africa) Mikaël Pitamber	(South Africa) Pablo Clark Racing	Mercedes-AMG GT3	34	National Cup
DNF	11	GT3	(South Africa) Sunthrasagaran Moodley	(South Africa) BigFoot Express Racing	Mercedes-AMG GT3	32	National Cup
DNF	51	GT4	(South Africa) Joseph Ellerine	(South Africa) MJR Motorsport	Audi R8 LMS GT4	30	National Cup

Intercontinental GT Challenge
Previous race: 2023 Bathurst 12 Hour	2023 season	Next race: 2023 24 Hours of Spa
