= 2023 Intercontinental GT Challenge =

Motorsport event

The 2023 Intercontinental GT Challenge was the eighth season of the Intercontinental GT Challenge. It comprised five rounds starting with the Bathurst 12 Hour on 3 February with the finale at Gulf 12 Hours on 9 December.

== Calendar ==
Map of circuit locations

Round	Race	Circuit	Date	Report
1	(Australia) Bathurst 12 Hour	Mount Panorama Circuit, Bathurst, Australia	3–5 February	Report
2	(South Africa) Kyalami 9 Hours	Kyalami Grand Prix Circuit, Midrand, South Africa	23–25 February	Report
3	(Belgium) 24 Hours of Spa	Circuit de Spa-Francorchamps, Stavelot, Belgium	29 June–2 July	Report
4	Indianapolis 8 Hour	Indianapolis Motor Speedway, Indianapolis, United States	5–7 October	Report
5	(United Arab Emirates) Gulf 12 Hours	Yas Marina Circuit, Abu Dhabi, United Arab Emirates	8–10 December	Report

Also part of the GT World Challenge Europe
Also part of the GT World Challenge America

== Entries ==
Manufacturer	Team	Car	No.	Drivers	Class	Rounds
BMW	(Belgium) Team WRT	M4 GT3	30	(Germany) Niklas Krütten	G	3
BMW	(Belgium) Team WRT	M4 GT3	30	(France) Jean-Baptiste Simmenauer	G	3
BMW	(Belgium) Team WRT	M4 GT3	30	(Australia) Calan Williams	G	3
BMW	(Belgium) Team WRT	M4 GT3	30	(Austria) Philipp Eng	P	4
BMW	(Belgium) Team WRT	M4 GT3	30	(South Africa) Sheldon van der Linde	P	4
BMW	(Belgium) Team WRT	M4 GT3	30	(Belgium) Dries Vanthoor	P	4
BMW	(Belgium) Team WRT	M4 GT3	31	(United Kingdom) Adam Carroll	P	3
BMW	(Belgium) Team WRT	M4 GT3	31	(United Kingdom) Lewis Proctor	P	3
BMW	(Belgium) Team WRT	M4 GT3	31	(United Kingdom) Tim Whale	P	3
BMW	(Belgium) Team WRT	M4 GT3	31	(Brazil) Augusto Farfus	P	4
BMW	(Belgium) Team WRT	M4 GT3	31	(Belgium) Maxime Martin	P	4
BMW	(Belgium) Team WRT	M4 GT3	31	(Belgium) Charles Weerts	P	4
BMW	(Belgium) Team WRT	M4 GT3	32	(South Africa) Sheldon van der Linde	P	1–3, 5
BMW	(Belgium) Team WRT	M4 GT3	32	(Belgium) Charles Weerts	P	1–3, 5
BMW	(Belgium) Team WRT	M4 GT3	32	(Belgium) Dries Vanthoor	P	1–3
BMW	(Belgium) Team WRT	M4 GT3	32	(Austria) Philipp Eng	P	5
BMW	(Belgium) Team WRT	M4 GT3	33	(Austria) Philipp Eng	P	2
BMW	(Belgium) Team WRT	M4 GT3	33	(Brazil) Augusto Farfus	P	2
BMW	(Belgium) Team WRT	M4 GT3	33	(Belgium) Maxime Martin	P	2
BMW	(Belgium) Team WRT	M4 GT3	46	(Italy) Valentino Rossi	P	1, 3, 5
BMW	(Belgium) Team WRT	M4 GT3	46	(Brazil) Augusto Farfus	P	1, 3
BMW	(Belgium) Team WRT	M4 GT3	46	(Belgium) Maxime Martin	P	1, 3
BMW	(Belgium) Team WRT	M4 GT3	46	(Belgium) Dries Vanthoor	P	5
BMW	(Belgium) Team WRT	M4 GT3	46	(United Kingdom) Nick Yelloly	P	5
BMW	(Canada) ST Racing	M4 GT3	38	(Canada) Samantha Tan	PA	4
BMW	(Canada) ST Racing	M4 GT3	38	(United States) Neil Verhagen	PA	4
BMW	(Canada) ST Racing	M4 GT3	38	(United States) Jake Walker	PA	4
BMW	(United States) Bimmerworld Racing	M4 GT3	94	(United States) Bill Auberlen	PA	4
BMW	(United States) Bimmerworld Racing	M4 GT3	94	(United States) Robby Foley	PA	4
BMW	(United States) Bimmerworld Racing	M4 GT3	94	(United States) Chandler Hull	PA	4
BMW	(Germany) ROWE Racing	M4 GT3	98	(Austria) Philipp Eng	P	3
BMW	(Germany) ROWE Racing	M4 GT3	98	(Germany) Marco Wittmann	P	3
BMW	(Germany) ROWE Racing	M4 GT3	98	(United Kingdom) Nick Yelloly	P	3
Mercedes-AMG	(United States) CrowdStrike Racing by Riley Motorsports	AMG GT3 Evo	04	(United States) Colin Braun	PA	4
Mercedes-AMG	(United States) CrowdStrike Racing by Riley Motorsports	AMG GT3 Evo	04	(United States) George Kurtz	PA	4
Mercedes-AMG	(United States) CrowdStrike Racing by Riley Motorsports	AMG GT3 Evo	04	(United States) Nolan Siegel	PA	4
Mercedes-AMG	(Bahrain) Mercedes-AMG Team 2 Seas	AMG GT3 Evo	14	(Germany) Maximilian Götz	P	5
Mercedes-AMG	(Bahrain) Mercedes-AMG Team 2 Seas	AMG GT3 Evo	14	(Andorra) Jules Gounon	P	5
Mercedes-AMG	(Bahrain) Mercedes-AMG Team 2 Seas	AMG GT3 Evo	14	(Germany) Fabian Schiller	P	5
Mercedes-AMG	(Germany) SPS automotive performance	AMG GT3 Evo	20	(Republic of Ireland) Reece Barr	PA	2
Mercedes-AMG	(Germany) SPS automotive performance	AMG GT3 Evo	20	(Portugal) Miguel Ramos	PA	2
Mercedes-AMG	(Germany) SPS automotive performance	AMG GT3 Evo	20	(Germany) Luca Stolz	PA	2
Mercedes-AMG	(United States) Winward Racing	AMG GT3 Evo	57	(Netherlands) Indy Dontje	G	3
Mercedes-AMG	(United States) Winward Racing	AMG GT3 Evo	57	(Switzerland) Philip Ellis	G	3
Mercedes-AMG	(United States) Winward Racing	AMG GT3 Evo	57	(United States) Russell Ward	G	3
Mercedes-AMG	(Australia) SunEnergy1 Racing	AMG GT3 Evo	75	(Andorra) Jules Gounon	P	1
Mercedes-AMG	(Australia) SunEnergy1 Racing	AMG GT3 Evo	75	(Australia) Kenny Habul	P	1
Mercedes-AMG	(Australia) SunEnergy1 Racing	AMG GT3 Evo	75	(Germany) Luca Stolz	P	1
Mercedes-AMG	(Australia) SunEnergy1 Racing	AMG GT3 Evo	75	(Australia) Kenny Habul	PA	2, 5
Mercedes-AMG	(Australia) SunEnergy1 Racing	AMG GT3 Evo	75	(Andorra) Jules Gounon	PA	2
Mercedes-AMG	(Australia) SunEnergy1 Racing	AMG GT3 Evo	75	(Switzerland) Yannick Mettler	PA	2
Mercedes-AMG	(Australia) SunEnergy1 Racing	AMG GT3 Evo	75	(Austria) Martin Konrad	PA	3, 5
Mercedes-AMG	(Australia) SunEnergy1 Racing	AMG GT3 Evo	75	(Netherlands) Nicky Catsburg	PA	3
Mercedes-AMG	(Australia) SunEnergy1 Racing	AMG GT3 Evo	75	(Australia) Chaz Mostert	PA	3
Mercedes-AMG	(Australia) SunEnergy1 Racing	AMG GT3 Evo	75	(Germany) Adam Osieka	PA	3
Mercedes-AMG	(Australia) SunEnergy1 Racing	AMG GT3 Evo	75	(Austria) Dominik Baumann	PA	5
Mercedes-AMG	(Australia) SunEnergy1 Racing	AMG GT3 Evo	75	(Switzerland) Philip Ellis	PA	5
Mercedes-AMG	(Hong Kong) Mercedes-AMG Craft-Bamboo Racing	AMG GT3 Evo	77	(Netherlands) Nicky Catsburg	P	1
Mercedes-AMG	(Hong Kong) Mercedes-AMG Craft-Bamboo Racing	AMG GT3 Evo	77	(Switzerland) Philip Ellis	P	1
Mercedes-AMG	(Hong Kong) Mercedes-AMG Craft-Bamboo Racing	AMG GT3 Evo	77	(Spain) Daniel Juncadella	P	1
Mercedes-AMG	(Hong Kong) Mercedes-AMG Craft-Bamboo Racing	AMG GT3 Evo	77	(Germany) Maximilian Götz	P	4
Mercedes-AMG	(Hong Kong) Mercedes-AMG Craft-Bamboo Racing	AMG GT3 Evo	77	(Andorra) Jules Gounon	P	4
Mercedes-AMG	(Hong Kong) Mercedes-AMG Craft-Bamboo Racing	AMG GT3 Evo	77	(Switzerland) Raffaele Marciello	P	4
Mercedes-AMG	(Hong Kong) Mercedes-AMG Team GruppeM Racing	AMG GT3 Evo	77	(Austria) Lucas Auer	P	5
Mercedes-AMG	(Hong Kong) Mercedes-AMG Team GruppeM Racing	AMG GT3 Evo	77	(United Kingdom) Frank Bird	P	5
Mercedes-AMG	(Hong Kong) Mercedes-AMG Team GruppeM Racing	AMG GT3 Evo	77	(Italy) Lorenzo Ferrari	P	5
Mercedes-AMG	(Hong Kong) Mercedes-AMG Team GruppeM Racing	AMG GT3 Evo	99	(Germany) Maro Engel	P	5
Mercedes-AMG	(Hong Kong) Mercedes-AMG Team GruppeM Racing	AMG GT3 Evo	99	(Canada) Mikaël Grenier	P	5
Mercedes-AMG	(Hong Kong) Mercedes-AMG Team GruppeM Racing	AMG GT3 Evo	99	(Germany) Luca Stolz	P	5
Mercedes-AMG	(Hong Kong) Mercedes-AMG Team GruppeM Racing	AMG GT3 Evo	999	(Germany) Maro Engel	P	1–4
Mercedes-AMG	(Hong Kong) Mercedes-AMG Team GruppeM Racing	AMG GT3 Evo	999	(Canada) Mikaël Grenier	P	1–3
Mercedes-AMG	(Hong Kong) Mercedes-AMG Team GruppeM Racing	AMG GT3 Evo	999	(Switzerland) Raffaele Marciello	P	1–2
Mercedes-AMG	(Hong Kong) Mercedes-AMG Team GruppeM Racing	AMG GT3 Evo	999	(Spain) Daniel Juncadella	P	3–4
Mercedes-AMG	(Hong Kong) Mercedes-AMG Team GruppeM Racing	AMG GT3 Evo	999	(Germany) Luca Stolz	P	4
Mercedes-AMG	(South Africa) Stradale Motorsport	AMG GT3 Evo	86	(South Africa) Charl Arangies	PA	2
Mercedes-AMG	(South Africa) Stradale Motorsport	AMG GT3 Evo	86	(South Africa) Arnold Neveling	PA	2
Mercedes-AMG	(South Africa) Stradale Motorsport	AMG GT3 Evo	86	(South Africa) Clint Weston	PA	2
Mercedes-AMG	(France) AKKodis ASP Team	AMG GT3 Evo	88	Timur Boguslavskiy	P	3
Mercedes-AMG	(France) AKKodis ASP Team	AMG GT3 Evo	88	(Andorra) Jules Gounon	P	3
Mercedes-AMG	(France) AKKodis ASP Team	AMG GT3 Evo	88	(Switzerland) Raffaele Marciello	P	3
Mercedes-AMG	(United States) DXDT Racing	AMG GT3 Evo	91	(United States) Jeff Burton	PA	4
Mercedes-AMG	(United States) DXDT Racing	AMG GT3 Evo	91	(Switzerland) Philip Ellis	PA	4
Mercedes-AMG	(United States) DXDT Racing	AMG GT3 Evo	91	(United States) Corey Lewis	PA	4
Mercedes-AMG	(Oman) Mercedes-AMG Team Al Manar	AMG GT3 Evo	777	(Austria) Lucas Auer	P	3
Mercedes-AMG	(Oman) Mercedes-AMG Team Al Manar	AMG GT3 Evo	777	(Germany) Fabian Schiller	P	3
Mercedes-AMG	(Oman) Mercedes-AMG Team Al Manar	AMG GT3 Evo	777	(Germany) Luca Stolz	P	3
Mercedes-AMG	(Australia) Makita Volante Rosso Motorsport	AMG GT3	24	(Australia) Tony Bates	PA	1
Mercedes-AMG	(Australia) Makita Volante Rosso Motorsport	AMG GT3	24	(Australia) Jordan Love	PA	1
Mercedes-AMG	(Australia) Makita Volante Rosso Motorsport	AMG GT3	24	(Australia) David Reynolds	PA	1
Porsche	(Australia) Grove Racing	911 GT3 R	4	(Australia) Brenton Grove	PA	1–2, 4–5
Porsche	(Australia) Grove Racing	911 GT3 R	4	(Australia) Stephen Grove	PA	1–2, 4–5
Porsche	(Australia) Grove Racing	911 GT3 R	4	(Australia) Anton de Pasquale	PA	1
Porsche	(Australia) Grove Racing	911 GT3 R	4	(New Zealand) Earl Bamber	PA	2, 4
Porsche	(Australia) Grove Racing	911 GT3 R	4	(New Zealand) Richie Stanaway	PA	5
Porsche	(Australia) Grove Racing	911 GT3 R	23	(New Zealand) Earl Bamber	B	3
Porsche	(Australia) Grove Racing	911 GT3 R	23	(Australia) Brenton Grove	B	3
Porsche	(Australia) Grove Racing	911 GT3 R	23	(Australia) Stephen Grove	B	3
Porsche	(Australia) Grove Racing	911 GT3 R	23	(Australia) Anton de Pasquale	B	3
Porsche	(Germany) Herberth Motorsport	911 GT3 R	7	(Switzerland) Daniel Allemann	Am	5
Porsche	(Germany) Herberth Motorsport	911 GT3 R	7	(Germany) Ralf Bohn	Am	5
Porsche	(Germany) Herberth Motorsport	911 GT3 R	7	(Germany) Alfred Renauer	Am	5
Porsche	(Germany) Herberth Motorsport	911 GT3 R	33	(Hong Kong) Antares Au	PA	5
Porsche	(Germany) Herberth Motorsport	911 GT3 R	33	(Italy) Matteo Cairoli	PA	5
Porsche	(Germany) Herberth Motorsport	911 GT3 R	33	(Germany) Tim Heinemann	PA	5
Porsche	(Germany) Car Collection Motorsport	911 GT3 R	12	(Italy) Stefano Costantini	PA	5
Porsche	(Germany) Car Collection Motorsport	911 GT3 R	12	(Switzerland) Alex Fontana	PA	5
Porsche	(Germany) Car Collection Motorsport	911 GT3 R	12	(Switzerland) Yannick Mettler	PA	5
Porsche	(Germany) Car Collection Motorsport	911 GT3 R	12	(United States) Hash Patel	PA	5
Porsche	(Germany) Huber Motorsport	911 GT3 R	20	(Hong Kong) Antares Au	PA	4
Porsche	(Germany) Huber Motorsport	911 GT3 R	20	(Germany) Laurin Heinrich	PA	4
Porsche	(Germany) Huber Motorsport	911 GT3 R	20	(Germany) Alfred Renauer	PA	4
Porsche	(United States) Wright Motorsports	911 GT3 R	45	(Belgium) Jan Heylen	P	4
Porsche	(United States) Wright Motorsports	911 GT3 R	45	(United States) Trent Hindman	P	4
Porsche	(United States) Wright Motorsports	911 GT3 R	45	(United States) Madison Snow	P	4
Porsche	(United States) MDK Motorsports	911 GT3 R	53	(Italy) Matteo Cairoli	P	4
Porsche	(United States) MDK Motorsports	911 GT3 R	53	(United States) Trenton Estep	P	4
Porsche	(United States) MDK Motorsports	911 GT3 R	53	(United States) Seth Lucas	P	4
Porsche	(Italy) Dinamic GT Huber Racing	911 GT3 R	54	(Germany) Christian Engelhart	P	3
Porsche	(Italy) Dinamic GT Huber Racing	911 GT3 R	54	(Turkey) Ayhancan Güven	P	3
Porsche	(Italy) Dinamic GT Huber Racing	911 GT3 R	54	(Germany) Sven Müller	P	3
Porsche	(Germany) Manthey EMA (Note: Car no. 92 entered under a German license.) (Australia) Manthey EMA (Note: Car no 912. entered under an Australian license.)	911 GT3 R	92	(France) Julien Andlauer	P	3
Porsche	(Germany) Manthey EMA (Australia) Manthey EMA	911 GT3 R	92	(France) Kévin Estre	P	3
Porsche	(Germany) Manthey EMA (Australia) Manthey EMA	911 GT3 R	92	(Belgium) Laurens Vanthoor	P	3
Porsche	(Germany) Manthey EMA (Australia) Manthey EMA	911 GT3 R	912	(Australia) Matt Campbell	P	1
Porsche	(Germany) Manthey EMA (Australia) Manthey EMA	911 GT3 R	912	(France) Mathieu Jaminet	P	1
Porsche	(Germany) Manthey EMA (Australia) Manthey EMA	911 GT3 R	912	(Austria) Thomas Preining	P	1
Porsche	(Germany) Rutronik Racing	911 GT3 R	96	(Germany) Laurin Heinrich	P	3
Porsche	(Germany) Rutronik Racing	911 GT3 R	96	(Norway) Dennis Olsen	P	3
Porsche	(Germany) Rutronik Racing	911 GT3 R	96	(Austria) Thomas Preining	P	3
Porsche	(United States) GMG Racing by Car Collection Motorsport	911 GT3 R	132	(Netherlands) Jeroen Bleekemolen	PA	3
Porsche	(United States) GMG Racing by Car Collection Motorsport	911 GT3 R	132	(United States) Patrick Long	PA	3
Porsche	(United States) GMG Racing by Car Collection Motorsport	911 GT3 R	132	(United States) James Sofronas	PA	3
Porsche	(United States) GMG Racing by Car Collection Motorsport	911 GT3 R	132	(United States) Kyle Washington	PA	3

Icon	Class
P	Pro Cup
S	Silver Cup
PA	Pro-Am Cup
G	Gold Cup
Am	Am Cup
B	Bronze Cup

Intercontinental GT Challenge Independent Cup
Manufacturer	Team	Car	No.	Drivers	Class	Rounds
Ferrari	(United Kingdom) Sky – Tempesta Racing	488 GT3 Evo 2020	535	(Italy) Eddie Cheever III	PA	4
Ferrari	(United Kingdom) Sky – Tempesta Racing	488 GT3 Evo 2020	535	(United Kingdom) Chris Froggatt	PA	4
Ferrari	(United Kingdom) Sky – Tempesta Racing	488 GT3 Evo 2020	535	(Hong Kong) Jonathan Hui	PA	4
McLaren	(United Kingdom) Sky – Tempesta Racing	720S GT3 Evo	93	(Italy) Eddie Cheever III	B	3
McLaren	(United Kingdom) Sky – Tempesta Racing	720S GT3 Evo	93	(United Kingdom) Chris Froggatt	B	3
McLaren	(United Kingdom) Sky – Tempesta Racing	720S GT3 Evo	93	(Hong Kong) Jonathan Hui	B	3
McLaren	(United Kingdom) Sky – Tempesta Racing	720S GT3 Evo	93	(Switzerland) Jeffrey Schmidt	B	3
McLaren	(United Kingdom) Sky – Tempesta Racing	720S GT3 Evo	93	(Italy) Eddie Cheever III	PA	5
McLaren	(United Kingdom) Sky – Tempesta Racing	720S GT3 Evo	93	(United Kingdom) Chris Froggatt	PA	5
McLaren	(United Kingdom) Sky – Tempesta Racing	720S GT3 Evo	93	(Hong Kong) Jonathan Hui	PA	5
McLaren	(United Kingdom) Sky – Tempesta Racing	720S GT3 Evo	93	(Macau) Kevin Tse	PA	5
Mercedes-AMG	(Australia) SunEnergy1 Racing	AMG GT3 Evo	75	(Australia) Kenny Habul	PA	2, 5
Mercedes-AMG	(Australia) SunEnergy1 Racing	AMG GT3 Evo	75	(Andorra) Jules Gounon	PA	2
Mercedes-AMG	(Australia) SunEnergy1 Racing	AMG GT3 Evo	75	(Switzerland) Yannick Mettler	PA	2
Mercedes-AMG	(Australia) SunEnergy1 Racing	AMG GT3 Evo	75	(Austria) Martin Konrad	PA	3, 5
Mercedes-AMG	(Australia) SunEnergy1 Racing	AMG GT3 Evo	75	(Netherlands) Nicky Catsburg	PA	3
Mercedes-AMG	(Australia) SunEnergy1 Racing	AMG GT3 Evo	75	(Australia) Chaz Mostert	PA	3
Mercedes-AMG	(Australia) SunEnergy1 Racing	AMG GT3 Evo	75	(Germany) Adam Osieka	PA	3
Mercedes-AMG	(Australia) SunEnergy1 Racing	AMG GT3 Evo	75	(Austria) Dominik Baumann	PA	5
Mercedes-AMG	(Australia) SunEnergy1 Racing	AMG GT3 Evo	75	(Switzerland) Philip Ellis	PA	5
Mercedes-AMG	(Australia) Harrolds Volante Rosso Motorsport	AMG GT3 Evo	101	(Hong Kong) Jonathan Hui	S	1
Mercedes-AMG	(Australia) Harrolds Volante Rosso Motorsport	AMG GT3 Evo	101	(Australia) Josh Hunt	S	1
Mercedes-AMG	(Australia) Harrolds Volante Rosso Motorsport	AMG GT3 Evo	101	(Australia) Ross Poulakis	S	1
Mercedes-AMG	(Australia) Harrolds Volante Rosso Motorsport	AMG GT3 Evo	101	(Macau) Kevin Tse	S	1
Porsche	(Australia) Grove Racing	911 GT3 R	4	(Australia) Brenton Grove	PA	1–2, 4–5
Porsche	(Australia) Grove Racing	911 GT3 R	4	(Australia) Stephen Grove	PA	1–2, 4–5
Porsche	(Australia) Grove Racing	911 GT3 R	4	(Australia) Anton de Pasquale	PA	1
Porsche	(Australia) Grove Racing	911 GT3 R	4	(New Zealand) Earl Bamber	PA	2, 4
Porsche	(Australia) Grove Racing	911 GT3 R	4	(New Zealand) Richie Stanaway	PA	5
Porsche	(Australia) Grove Racing	911 GT3 R	23	(New Zealand) Earl Bamber	B	3
Porsche	(Australia) Grove Racing	911 GT3 R	23	(Australia) Brenton Grove	B	3
Porsche	(Australia) Grove Racing	911 GT3 R	23	(Australia) Stephen Grove	B	3
Porsche	(Australia) Grove Racing	911 GT3 R	23	(Australia) Anton de Pasquale	B	3
Porsche	(Germany) Huber Motorsport	911 GT3 R	20	(Hong Kong) Antares Au	B	3
Porsche	(Germany) Huber Motorsport	911 GT3 R	20	(Italy) Matteo Cairoli	B	3
Porsche	(Germany) Huber Motorsport	911 GT3 R	20	(Germany) Jannes Fittje	B	3
Porsche	(Germany) Huber Motorsport	911 GT3 R	20	(Germany) Tim Heinemann	B	3
Porsche	(Germany) Huber Motorsport	911 GT3 R	20	(Hong Kong) Antares Au	PA	4
Porsche	(Germany) Huber Motorsport	911 GT3 R	20	(Germany) Laurin Heinrich	PA	4
Porsche	(Germany) Huber Motorsport	911 GT3 R	20	(Germany) Alfred Renauer	PA	4
Porsche	(Germany) Herberth Motorsport	911 GT3 R	33	(Hong Kong) Antares Au	PA	5
Porsche	(Germany) Herberth Motorsport	911 GT3 R	33	(Italy) Matteo Cairoli	PA	5
Porsche	(Germany) Herberth Motorsport	911 GT3 R	33	(Germany) Tim Heinemann	PA	5

== Championship standings ==
Scoring system

Championship points were awarded for the first ten positions in each race. Entries were required to complete 75% of the winning car's race distance in order to be classified and earn points. Individual drivers were required to participate for a minimum of 25 minutes in order to earn championship points in any race. A manufacturer only received points for its two highest placed cars in each round.

Position	**1st**	**2nd**	**3rd**	**4th**	**5th**	**6th**	**7th**	**8th**	**9th**	**10th**
Points	25	18	15	12	10	8	6	4	2	1

=== Drivers' championships ===
The results indicate the classification relative to other drivers in the series, not the classification in the race.

Pos.	Driver	Manufacturer	BAT (Australia)	KYA (South Africa)	SPA (Belgium)	IND (United States)	ABU (United Arab Emirates)	Points
1	(Andorra) Jules Gounon	Mercedes-AMG	1	3	2	2	3	91
2	(Germany) Luca Stolz	Mercedes-AMG	1	4	6	3	**1**	83
3	(Belgium) Dries Vanthoor	BMW	4	1	Ret	1	2	80
4	(Austria) Philipp Eng	BMW		2	1	1	7	74
5	(South Africa) Sheldon van der Linde	BMW	4	1	Ret	1	7	68
6	(Germany) Maro Engel	Mercedes-AMG	**3**	**7**	Ret	3	**1**	61
7	(Switzerland) Raffaele Marciello	Mercedes-AMG	**3**	**7**	2	2		57
8	(Canada) Mikaël Grenier	Mercedes-AMG	**3**	**7**	Ret		**1**	46
9	(Belgium) Charles Weerts	BMW	4	1	Ret	10	7	44
10	(United Kingdom) Nick Yelloly	BMW			1		2	43
11	(Australia) Kenny Habul	Mercedes-AMG	1	3			NC	40
12	(Brazil) Augusto Farfus (Belgium) Maxime Martin	BMW	5	2	5	10		39
13	(Italy) Valentino Rossi	BMW	5		5		2	38
14	(Germany) Maximilian Götz	Mercedes-AMG				2	3	33
15	(Austria) Thomas Preining	Porsche	2		4			30
16	(Germany) Marco Wittmann	BMW			1			25
17	(Spain) Daniel Juncadella	Mercedes-AMG	6		Ret	3		23
=	(Germany) Fabian Schiller	Mercedes-AMG			6		3	23
18	(Germany) Laurin Heinrich	Porsche			4	**6**		20
=	(Austria) Lucas Auer	Mercedes-AMG			6		4	20
19	(Australia) Matt Campbell (France) Mathieu Jaminet	Porsche	2					18
=	Timur Boguslavskiy	Mercedes-AMG			2			18
=	(Hong Kong) Antares Au	Porsche				**6**	5	18
20	(Germany) Alfred Renauer	Porsche				**6**	6	16
=	(Italy) Matteo Cairoli	Porsche				7	5	16
21	(Switzerland) Yannick Mettler	Mercedes-AMG		3			DNS	15
=	(France) Kévin Estre (Belgium) Laurens Vanthoor (France) Julien Andlauer	Porsche			3			15
22	(Australia) Brenton Grove (Australia) Stephen Grove	Porsche	Ret	4	11	9	Ret	14
=	(New Zealand) Earl Bamber	Porsche		4	11	9		14
23	(Norway) Dennis Olsen	Porsche			4			12
=	(Belgium) Jan Heylen (United States) Trent Hindman (United States) Madison Snow	Porsche				4		12
=	(Italy) Lorenzo Ferrari (United Kingdom) Frank Bird	Mercedes-AMG					4	12
24	(Netherlands) Nicky Catsburg	Mercedes-AMG	6		9			10
=	(Portugal) Miguel Ramos (Republic of Ireland) Reece Barr	Mercedes-AMG		5				10
=	(United States) Colin Braun (United States) George Kurtz (United States) Nolan Siegel	Mercedes-AMG				5		10
=	(Germany) Tim Heinemann	Porsche					5	10
25	(Switzerland) Philip Ellis	Mercedes-AMG	6		10	Ret	NC	9
26	(South Africa) Charl Arangies (South Africa) Arnold Neveling (South Africa) Clint Weston	Mercedes-AMG		6				8
=	(Switzerland) Daniel Allemann (Germany) Ralf Bohn	Porsche					6	8
27	(Australia) Tony Bates (Australia) Jordan Love (Australia) David Reynolds	Mercedes-AMG	7					6
=	(Germany) Christian Engelhart (Germany) Sven Müller (Turkey) Ayhancan Güven	Porsche			7			6
=	(United States) Trenton Estep (United States) Seth Lucas	Porsche				7		6
28	(Germany) Niklas Krütten (France) Jean-Baptiste Simmenauer (Australia) Calan Williams	BMW			8			4
=	(Canada) Samantha Tan (United States) Neil Verhagen (United States) Jake Walker	BMW				8		4
29	(Austria) Martin Konrad	Mercedes-AMG			9		NC	2
=	(Australia) Chaz Mostert (Germany) Adam Osieka	Mercedes-AMG			9			2
30	(Netherlands) Indy Dontje (United States) Russell Ward	Mercedes-AMG			10			1
-	(Australia) Anton de Pasquale	Porsche	Ret		11			0
-	(United States) Bill Auberlen (United States) Robby Foley (United States) Chandler Hull	BMW				11		0
-	(Austria) Dominik Baumann	Mercedes-AMG					NC	0
-	(Netherlands) Jeroen Bleekemolen (United States) Patrick Long (United States) James Sofronas (United States) Kyle Washington	Porsche			Ret			0
-	(United States) Jeff Burton (United States) Corey Lewis	Mercedes-AMG				Ret		0
-	(New Zealand) Richie Stanaway	Porsche					Ret	0
Pos.	Driver	Manufacturer	BAT (Australia)	KYA (South Africa)	SPA (Belgium)	IND (United States)	ABU (United Arab Emirates)	Points

Colour	Result
Gold	Winner
Silver	Second place
Bronze	Third place
Green	Points classification
Blue	Non-points classification
Blue	Non-classified finish (NC)
Purple	Retired, not classified (Ret)
Red	Did not qualify (DNQ)
Red	Did not pre-qualify (DNPQ)
Black	Disqualified (DSQ)
White	Did not start (DNS)
White	Withdrew (WD)
White	Race cancelled (C)
Blank	Did not practice (DNP)
Blank	Did not arrive (DNA)
Blank	Excluded (EX)

**Bold** – Pole
Italics – Fastest Lap

=== Manufacturer's championship ===
Pos.	Manufacturer	BAT (Australia)	KYA (South Africa)	SPA (Belgium)	IND (United States)	ABU (United Arab Emirates)	Points
1	(Germany) Mercedes-AMG	1	3	2	2	**1**	164
1	(Germany) Mercedes-AMG	**3**	5	6	3	3	164
2	(Germany) BMW	4	1	1	1	2	159
2	(Germany) BMW	5	2	5	8	7	159
3	(Germany) Porsche	2	4	3	4	5	101
3	(Germany) Porsche	Ret		4	**6**	6	101

== See also ==
- 2023 British GT Championship
- 2023 GT World Challenge Europe
- 2023 GT World Challenge Europe Sprint Cup
- 2023 GT World Challenge Europe Endurance Cup
- 2023 GT World Challenge Asia
- 2023 GT World Challenge America
- 2023 GT World Challenge Australia
