= 2023 Bathurst 12 Hour =

Car endurance race in Australia

(Australia) 2023 Liqui-Moly Bathurst 12 Hour
Event Information
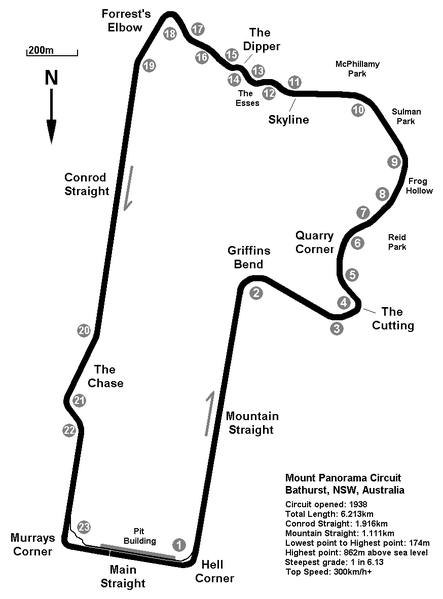
- Date: 3–5 February 2023
- Location: Bathurst, New South Wales
- Venue: Mount Panorama Circuit

Results
Race 1
| Distance | laps | km |
| Pole position | (Germany) Maro Engel; GruppeM Racing | 2:00.8819 |

The 2023 Liqui Moly Bathurst 12 Hour was an endurance race for FIA GT3 cars and invited vehicles, staged at the Mount Panorama Circuit in Bathurst, New South Wales, Australia, on 5 February 2023. It was the opening round of five in the 2023 Intercontinental GT Challenge.

The race was won by the SunEnergy1 AKKodis ASP Team entered Mercedes-AMG GT3 Evo driven by Kenny Habul, Jules Gounon and Luca Stolz.

== Entry list ==
=== Class structure ===
Entries were divided into classes based on car type and driver ratings.

- Class A – GT3 (current-specification GT3 cars)
  - Pro - for driving combinations with no driver category restrictions.
  - Pro-Am - for driving combinations featuring two FIA Platinum-, FIA Gold- or FIA Silver-rated drivers and one or two FIA Bronze-rated drivers.
  - Silver Cup - for driving combinations featuring only FIA Silver- and FIA Bronze-rated drivers
  - Bronze - for driving combinations featuring only FIA Bronze-rated drivers.
- Class I – Invitational class
  - Class I will be open to MARC Cars, GT2 cars and GTC cars from one-make categories.
  - Class I entries are required to have at least one FIA Bronze-rated driver.

Class B was also available for entry for Porsche GT3 Cup cars and Class C was also available for entry for GT4 cars, however due to a lack of entries in both classes, Classes B & C were merged into Class I.

=== Entries ===
| Team | Car | Engine | No. | Drivers | Class |
Class A (GT3)
| (Australia) Grove Racing | Porsche 911 GT3 R | Porsche 4.0 L Flat-6 | 4 | (Australia) Anton De Pasquale | PA |
| (Australia) Grove Racing | Porsche 911 GT3 R | Porsche 4.0 L Flat-6 | 4 | (Australia) Brenton Grove | PA |
| (Australia) Grove Racing | Porsche 911 GT3 R | Porsche 4.0 L Flat-6 | 4 | (Australia) Stephen Grove | PA |
| (Australia) Wall Racing | Lamborghini Huracán GT3 Evo | Lamborghini DGF 5.2 L V10 | 6 | (Australia) Tony D'Alberto | S |
| (Australia) Wall Racing | Lamborghini Huracán GT3 Evo | Lamborghini DGF 5.2 L V10 | 6 | (Australia) Adrian Deitz | S |
| (Australia) Wall Racing | Lamborghini Huracán GT3 Evo | Lamborghini DGF 5.2 L V10 | 6 | (Australia) Grant Denyer | S |
| (Australia) Wall Racing | Lamborghini Huracán GT3 Evo | Lamborghini DGF 5.2 L V10 | 6 | (Australia) David Wall | S |
| (Australia) Hallmarc Racing | Audi R8 LMS Evo II | Audi DAR 5.2 L V10 | 9 | (Australia) Marc Cini | PA |
| (Australia) Hallmarc Racing | Audi R8 LMS Evo II | Audi DAR 5.2 L V10 | 9 | (Australia) Dean Fiore | PA |
| (Australia) Hallmarc Racing | Audi R8 LMS Evo II | Audi DAR 5.2 L V10 | 9 | (Australia) Lee Holdsworth | PA |
| (New Zealand) International Motorsport (Note: Car #10 ran under the commercial title "Myland Team IMS".) | Audi R8 LMS Evo II | Audi DAR 5.2 L V10 | 10 | (New Zealand) Andrew Fawcet | S |
| (New Zealand) International Motorsport | Audi R8 LMS Evo II | Audi DAR 5.2 L V10 | 10 | (New Zealand) Daniel Gaunt | S |
| (New Zealand) International Motorsport | Audi R8 LMS Evo II | Audi DAR 5.2 L V10 | 10 | (Australia) Dylan O'Keeffe | S |
| (Australia) Volante Rosso Motorsport | Mercedes-AMG GT3 Evo | Mercedes-AMG M159 6.2 L V8 | 24 | (Australia) Tony Bates | PA |
| (Australia) Volante Rosso Motorsport | Mercedes-AMG GT3 Evo | Mercedes-AMG M159 6.2 L V8 | 24 | (Australia) Jordan Love | PA |
| (Australia) Volante Rosso Motorsport | Mercedes-AMG GT3 Evo | Mercedes-AMG M159 6.2 L V8 | 24 | (Australia) David Reynolds | PA |
| (Australia) Volante Rosso Motorsport | Mercedes-AMG GT3 Evo | Mercedes-AMG M159 6.2 L V8 | 101 | (Hong Kong) Jonathan Hui | S |
| (Australia) Volante Rosso Motorsport | Mercedes-AMG GT3 Evo | Mercedes-AMG M159 6.2 L V8 | 101 | (Australia) Josh Hunt | S |
| (Australia) Volante Rosso Motorsport | Mercedes-AMG GT3 Evo | Mercedes-AMG M159 6.2 L V8 | 101 | (Australia) Ross Poulakis | S |
| (Australia) Volante Rosso Motorsport | Mercedes-AMG GT3 Evo | Mercedes-AMG M159 6.2 L V8 | 101 | (Macau) Kevin Tse | S |
| (Belgium) Team WRT (Note: Cars #32 and #46 ran under the commercial title "BMW M Team WRT".) | BMW M4 GT3 | BMW S58B30T0 3.0 L Turbo I6 | 32 | (South Africa) Sheldon van der Linde | P |
| (Belgium) Team WRT | BMW M4 GT3 | BMW S58B30T0 3.0 L Turbo I6 | 32 | (Belgium) Dries Vanthoor | P |
| (Belgium) Team WRT | BMW M4 GT3 | BMW S58B30T0 3.0 L Turbo I6 | 32 | (Belgium) Charles Weerts | P |
| (Belgium) Team WRT | BMW M4 GT3 | BMW S58B30T0 3.0 L Turbo I6 | 46 | (Brazil) Augusto Farfus | P |
| (Belgium) Team WRT | BMW M4 GT3 | BMW S58B30T0 3.0 L Turbo I6 | 46 | (Belgium) Maxime Martin | P |
| (Belgium) Team WRT | BMW M4 GT3 | BMW S58B30T0 3.0 L Turbo I6 | 46 | (Italy) Valentino Rossi | P |
| (Australia) Valmont Racing | Mercedes-AMG GT3 Evo | Mercedes-AMG M159 6.2 L V8 | 44 | (Australia) Aaron Cameron | S |
| (Australia) Valmont Racing | Mercedes-AMG GT3 Evo | Mercedes-AMG M159 6.2 L V8 | 44 | (Australia) Duvashen Padayachee | S |
| (Australia) Valmont Racing | Mercedes-AMG GT3 Evo | Mercedes-AMG M159 6.2 L V8 | 44 | (Australia) Sergio Pires | S |
| (Australia) Valmont Racing | Mercedes-AMG GT3 Evo | Mercedes-AMG M159 6.2 L V8 | 44 | (Australia) Marcel Zalloua | S |
| (Australia) Melbourne Performance Centre (Note: Car #47 ran under the commercial title "Supabarn Team MPC", Car #65 ran under the commercial title "Sportsbet Team MPC", Car #74 ran under the commercial title "Audi Sport Team MPC", and Car #777 ran under the commercial title "The Bend Motorsport Park Team MPC".) | Audi R8 LMS Evo II | Audi DAR 5.2 L V10 | 47 | (Australia) James Koundouris | S |
| (Australia) Melbourne Performance Centre | Audi R8 LMS Evo II | Audi DAR 5.2 L V10 | 47 | (Australia) Theo Koundouris | S |
| (Australia) Melbourne Performance Centre | Audi R8 LMS Evo II | Audi DAR 5.2 L V10 | 47 | (Australia) David Russell | S |
| (Australia) Melbourne Performance Centre | Audi R8 LMS Evo II | Audi DAR 5.2 L V10 | 47 | (Australia) Jonathon Webb | S |
| (Australia) Melbourne Performance Centre | Audi R8 LMS Evo II | Audi DAR 5.2 L V10 | 65 | (Australia) Chaz Mostert | PA |
| (Australia) Melbourne Performance Centre | Audi R8 LMS Evo II | Audi DAR 5.2 L V10 | 65 | (Australia) Fraser Ross | PA |
| (Australia) Melbourne Performance Centre | Audi R8 LMS Evo II | Audi DAR 5.2 L V10 | 65 | (Australia) Liam Talbot | PA |
| (Australia) Melbourne Performance Centre | Audi R8 LMS Evo II | Audi DAR 5.2 L V10 | 74 | (Italy) Mattia Drudi (Note: Drudi is an Italian driver competing under a Sammarinese licence.) | P |
| (Australia) Melbourne Performance Centre | Audi R8 LMS Evo II | Audi DAR 5.2 L V10 | 74 | (Germany) Christopher Haase | P |
| (Australia) Melbourne Performance Centre | Audi R8 LMS Evo II | Audi DAR 5.2 L V10 | 74 | (Switzerland) Patric Niederhauser | P |
| (Australia) Melbourne Performance Centre | Audi R8 LMS Evo II | Audi DAR 5.2 L V10 | 777 | (Switzerland) Ricardo Feller | PA |
| (Australia) Melbourne Performance Centre | Audi R8 LMS Evo II | Audi DAR 5.2 L V10 | 777 | (Germany) Christopher Mies | PA |
| (Australia) Melbourne Performance Centre | Audi R8 LMS Evo II | Audi DAR 5.2 L V10 | 777 | (Australia) Yasser Shahin | PA |
| (Australia) M Motorsport / (Australia) Vantage Racing | Audi R8 LMS Evo II^{1} | Audi DAR 5.2 L V10 | 50 | (Australia) David Crampton | S |
| (Australia) M Motorsport / (Australia) Vantage Racing | Audi R8 LMS Evo II^{1} | Audi DAR 5.2 L V10 | 50 | (Australia) Trent Harrison | S |
| (Australia) M Motorsport / (Australia) Vantage Racing | Audi R8 LMS Evo II^{1} | Audi DAR 5.2 L V10 | 50 | (Australia) Glen Wood | S |
| (Australia) PremiAir Racing / (Australia) Schumacher Motorsport (Note: Car #55 ran under the commercial title "Schumacher Motorsport Fuchs Racing".) | Audi R8 LMS Evo II | Audi DAR 5.2 L V10 | 55 | (Australia) James Golding | PA |
| (Australia) PremiAir Racing / (Australia) Schumacher Motorsport | Audi R8 LMS Evo II | Audi DAR 5.2 L V10 | 55 | (Australia) Brad Schumacher | PA |
| (Australia) PremiAir Racing / (Australia) Schumacher Motorsport | Audi R8 LMS Evo II | Audi DAR 5.2 L V10 | 55 | (Belgium) Frédéric Vervisch | PA |
| (Australia) SunEnergy1 Racing / (France) AKKodis ASP Team (Note: Car #75 ran under the commercial title "SunEnergy1 AKKodis ASP Team".) | Mercedes-AMG GT3 Evo | Mercedes-AMG M159 6.2 L V8 | 75 | (France) Jules Gounon (Note: Gounon is a French driver competing under an Andorran licence.) | P |
| (Australia) SunEnergy1 Racing / (France) AKKodis ASP Team | Mercedes-AMG GT3 Evo | Mercedes-AMG M159 6.2 L V8 | 75 | (Australia) Kenny Habul | P |
| (Australia) SunEnergy1 Racing / (France) AKKodis ASP Team | Mercedes-AMG GT3 Evo | Mercedes-AMG M159 6.2 L V8 | 75 | (Germany) Luca Stolz | P |
| (Hong Kong) Craft-Bamboo Racing (Note: Car #77 ran under the commercial title "Mercedes-AMG Craft-Bamboo Racing".) | Mercedes-AMG GT3 Evo | Mercedes-AMG M159 6.2 L V8 | 77 | (Netherlands) Nicky Catsburg | P |
| (Hong Kong) Craft-Bamboo Racing | Mercedes-AMG GT3 Evo | Mercedes-AMG M159 6.2 L V8 | 77 | (Switzerland) Philip Ellis | P |
| (Hong Kong) Craft-Bamboo Racing | Mercedes-AMG GT3 Evo | Mercedes-AMG M159 6.2 L V8 | 77 | (Spain) Daniel Juncadella | P |
| (Australia) Triple Eight Race Engineering | Mercedes-AMG GT3 Evo | Mercedes-AMG M159 6.2 L V8 | 99 | (Malaysia) Prince Jeffri Ibrahim | PA |
| (Australia) Triple Eight Race Engineering | Mercedes-AMG GT3 Evo | Mercedes-AMG M159 6.2 L V8 | 99 | (New Zealand) Richie Stanaway | PA |
| (Australia) Triple Eight Race Engineering | Mercedes-AMG GT3 Evo | Mercedes-AMG M159 6.2 L V8 | 99 | (Australia) Jamie Whincup | PA |
| (Australia) Triple Eight Race Engineering | Mercedes-AMG GT3 Evo | Mercedes-AMG M159 6.2 L V8 | 888 | (Australia) Broc Feeney | P |
| (Australia) Triple Eight Race Engineering | Mercedes-AMG GT3 Evo | Mercedes-AMG M159 6.2 L V8 | 888 | (Germany) Maximilian Götz | P |
| (Australia) Triple Eight Race Engineering | Mercedes-AMG GT3 Evo | Mercedes-AMG M159 6.2 L V8 | 888 | (New Zealand) Shane van Gisbergen | P |
| (Australia) Scott Taylor Motorsport | Mercedes-AMG GT3 | Mercedes-AMG M159 6.2 L V8 | 222 | (Australia) Alex Davison | PA |
| (Australia) Scott Taylor Motorsport | Mercedes-AMG GT3 | Mercedes-AMG M159 6.2 L V8 | 222 | (Australia) Geoff Emery | PA |
| (Australia) Scott Taylor Motorsport | Mercedes-AMG GT3 | Mercedes-AMG M159 6.2 L V8 | 222 | (Australia) Craig Lowndes | PA |
| (Australia) Scott Taylor Motorsport | Mercedes-AMG GT3 | Mercedes-AMG M159 6.2 L V8 | 222 | (Australia) Scott Taylor | PA |
| (Germany) Manthey Racing / (Australia) EMA Motorsport (Note: Car #912 ran under the commercial title "Manthey EMA Motorsport".) | Porsche 911 GT3 R | Porsche 4.0 L Flat-6 | 912 | (Australia) Matt Campbell | P |
| (Germany) Manthey Racing / (Australia) EMA Motorsport | Porsche 911 GT3 R | Porsche 4.0 L Flat-6 | 912 | (France) Mathieu Jaminet | P |
| (Germany) Manthey Racing / (Australia) EMA Motorsport | Porsche 911 GT3 R | Porsche 4.0 L Flat-6 | 912 | (Austria) Thomas Preining | P |
| (Hong Kong) GruppeM Racing | Mercedes-AMG GT3 Evo | Mercedes-AMG M159 6.2 L V8 | 999 | (Germany) Maro Engel | P |
| (Hong Kong) GruppeM Racing | Mercedes-AMG GT3 Evo | Mercedes-AMG M159 6.2 L V8 | 999 | (Canada) Mikaël Grenier | P |
| (Hong Kong) GruppeM Racing | Mercedes-AMG GT3 Evo | Mercedes-AMG M159 6.2 L V8 | 999 | (Switzerland) Raffaele Marciello | P |
Class I (Invitational)
| (Australia) Nineteen Corporation | Mercedes-AMG GT4 | Mercedes-AMG M178 4.0 L Turbo V8 | 19 | (Australia) Mark Griffith | INV |
| (Australia) Nineteen Corporation | Mercedes-AMG GT4 | Mercedes-AMG M178 4.0 L Turbo V8 | 19 | (Australia) Christian Pancione | INV |
| (Australia) Nineteen Corporation | Mercedes-AMG GT4 | Mercedes-AMG M178 4.0 L Turbo V8 | 19 | (Germany) Fabian Schiller | INV |
| (Papua New Guinea) Wheels / FX Racing | MARC II V8 | Ford Modular 5.2 L V8 | 52 | (Papua New Guinea) Keith Kassulke | INV |
| (Papua New Guinea) Wheels / FX Racing | MARC II V8 | Ford Modular 5.2 L V8 | 52 | (Australia) Cameron McLeod | INV |
| (Papua New Guinea) Wheels / FX Racing | MARC II V8 | Ford Modular 5.2 L V8 | 52 | (Australia) Hadrian Morrall | INV |
| (Australia) Daytona Sports Cars | SIN R1 GT4 | GM LS7 7.0 L V8 | 66 | (Australia) Ben Schoots | INV |
| (Australia) Daytona Sports Cars | SIN R1 GT4 | GM LS7 7.0 L V8 | 66 | (Australia) Dylan Thomas | INV |
| (Australia) Daytona Sports Cars | SIN R1 GT4 | GM LS7 7.0 L V8 | 66 | (Australia) Shane Woodman | INV |
| (Australia) MRA Motorsport | MARC Mazda 3 V8 | Ford Coyote 5.0 L V8 | 111 | (Australia) Darren Currie | INV |
| (Australia) MRA Motorsport | MARC Mazda 3 V8 | Ford Coyote 5.0 L V8 | 111 | (Australia) Grant Donaldson | INV |
| (Australia) MRA Motorsport | MARC Mazda 3 V8 | Ford Coyote 5.0 L V8 | 111 | (Australia) Geoff Taunton | INV |

| Icon | Class |
|---|---|
| P | Pro |
| S | Silver |
| PA | Pro-Am |
| Am | Am |
| INV | Invitational |

^1 – The #50 Vantage Racing entry switched from a KTM X-Bow GT2 Concept to an Audi R8 LMS Evo II following an engine failure during Friday practice.

== Qualifying ==
=== Qualifying ===
| Pos. | No. | Class | Drivers | Team | Car | Combined Time | Gap |
|---|---|---|---|---|---|---|---|
| 1 | 999 | PRO | (Germany) Maro Engel (Italy) Raffaele Marciello | (Hong Kong) GruppeM Racing | Mercedes-AMG GT3 Evo | | |
| 2 | 75 | PRO | (Germany) Luca Stolz (France) Jules Gounon | (Australia) SunEnergy1 Racing / (France) Akkodis ASP Team | | | |
| 3 | 888 | PRO | (Australia) Broc Feeney (Germany) Maximilian Götz | (Australia) Triple Eight Race Engineering | | | |
| 4 | 912 | PRO | (Australia) Matthew Campbell (France) Mathieu Jaminet | (Germany) Manthey Racing / (Australia) EMA Motorsport | | | |
| 5 | 32 | PRO | (South Africa) Sheldon van der Linde (Belgium) Dries Vanthoor | (Belgium) Team WRT | | | |
| 6 | 46 | PRO | (Brazil) Augusto Farfus (Belgium) Maxime Martin | (Belgium) Team WRT | | | |
| 7 | 74 | PRO | (Italy) Mattia Drudi (Germany) Christopher Haase | (Australia) Melbourne Performance Centre | | | |
| 8 | 65 | PAM | (Australia) Chaz Mostert (Australia) Liam Talbot | (Australia) Melbourne Performance Centre | | | |
| 9 | 77 | PRO | (Netherlands) Nicky Catsburg (Spain) Daniel Juncadella | (Hong Kong) Craft-Bamboo Racing | | | |
| 10 | 44 | SIL | (Australia) Aaron Cameron (Australia) Duvashen Padayachee | (Australia) Valmont Racing | | | |
| 11 | 6 | SIL | (Australia) Tony D'Alberto (Australia) David Wall | (Australia) Wall Racing | | | |
| 12 | 55 | PAM | (Belgium) Frédéric Vervisch (Australia) Brad Schumacher | (Australia) PremiAir Racing / (Australia) Schumacher Motorsport | | | |
| 13 | 10 | SIL | (New Zealand) Daniel Gaunt (Australia) Dylan O'Keeffe | (New Zealand) International Motorsport | | | |
| 14 | 47 | SIL | (Australia) David Russell (Australia) Jonathon Webb | (Australia) Melbourne Performance Centre | | | |
| 15 | 99 | PAM | (New Zealand) Richie Stanaway (Malaysia) Prince Jefri Ibrahim | (Australia) Triple Eight Race Engineering | | | |
| 16 | 777 | PAM | (Switzerland) Ricardo Feller (Australia) Yasser Shahin | (Australia) Melbourne Performance Centre | | | |
| 17 | 222 | PAM | (Australia) Alex Davison (Australia) Geoff Emery | (Australia) Scott Taylor Motorsport | | | |
| 18 | 24 | PAM | (Australia) Jordan Love (Australia) Tony Bates | (Australia) Volante Rosso Motorsport | | | |
| 19 | 101 | SIL | (Australia) Josh Hunt (Macau) Tse Wingkin | (Australia) Volante Rosso Motorsport | | | |
| 20 | 4 | PAM | (Australia) Anton de Pasquale (Australia) Stephen Grove | (Australia) Grove Racing | | | |
| 21 | 9 | PAM | (Australia) Lee Holdsworth (Australia) Marc Cini | (Australia) Hallmarc Racing | | | |
| 22 | 50 | SIL | (Australia) Glen Wood (Australia) David Crampton | (Australia) M Motorsport / (Australia) Vantage Racing | | | |
| 23 | 19 | INV | (Australia) Christan Pancione (Australia) Mark Griffith | (Australia) Nineteen Corporation | | | |
| 24 | 111 | INV | (Australia) Grant Donaldson | (Australia) MRA Motorsport | | | |
| WD | 66 | INV | | (Australia) Daytona Sportscar | | | |
| WD | 52 | INV | | (Papua New Guinea) Wheels FX Racing | | | |

=== Top Ten Shootout ===
| Pos. | No. | Class | Driver | Team | Car | Time | Gap |
|---|---|---|---|---|---|---|---|
| 1 | 999 | PRO | (Germany) Maro Engel | (Hong Kong) GruppeM Racing | Mercedes-AMG GT3 Evo | 2:00.8819 | |
| 2 | 888 | PRO | (Australia) Broc Feeney | (Australia) Triple Eight Race Engineering | Mercedes-AMG GT3 Evo | 2:01.0983 | +0.2164 |
| 3 | 912 | PRO | (Australia) Matthew Campbell | (Germany) Manthey Racing / (Australia) EMA Motorsport | Porsche 911 GT3 R | 2:01.1730 | +0.2911 |
| 4 | 75 | PRO | (France) Jules Gounon | (Australia) SunEnergy1 Racing / (France) AKKodis ASP Team | Mercedes-AMG GT3 Evo | 2:01.2916 | +0.4097 |
| 5 | 65 | PAM | (Australia) Chaz Mostert | (Australia) Melbourne Performance Centre | Audi R8 LMS Evo II | 2:01.8694 | +0.9875 |
| 6 | 46 | PRO | (Belgium) Maxime Martin | (Belgium) Team WRT | BMW M4 GT3 | 2:02.5083 | +1.6264 |
| 7 | 44 | SIL | (Australia) Aaron Cameron | (Australia) Valmont Racing | Mercedes-AMG GT3 Evo | 2:02.5482 | +1.6663 |
| 8 | 77 | PRO | (Spain) Daniel Juncadella | (Hong Kong) Craft-Bamboo Racing | Mercedes-AMG GT3 Evo | 2:03.0311 | +2.1492 |
| DSQ | 32 | PRO | (South Africa) Sheldon van der Linde | (Belgium) Team WRT | BMW M4 GT3 | Time Disallowed | |
| DSQ | 74 | PRO | (Germany) Christopher Haase | (Australia) Melbourne Performance Centre | Audi R8 LMS Evo II | Time Disallowed | |
Provisional Results

== Race ==
Class winners indicated in bold and with ‡.

| Pos. | Class | No. | Team | Drivers | Car | Laps | Time/Retired |
| Pos. | Class | No. | Team | Drivers | Engine | Laps | Time/Retired |
|---|---|---|---|---|---|---|---|
| 1 | P | **75** | **(Australia) SunEnergy1 Racing / (France) AKKodis ASP Team** | **(Australia) Kenny Habul (France) Jules Gounon (Germany) Luca Stolz** | **Mercedes-AMG GT3 Evo** | **323** | **12:00:40.1193‡** |
| 1 | P | **75** | **(Australia) SunEnergy1 Racing / (France) AKKodis ASP Team** | **(Australia) Kenny Habul (France) Jules Gounon (Germany) Luca Stolz** | **Mercedes-AMG M159 6.2 L V8** | **323** | **12:00:40.1193‡** |
| 2 | P | 912 | (Germany) Manthey Racing / (Australia) EMA Motorsport | (Australia) Matthew Campbell (France) Mathieu Jaminet (Austria) Thomas Preining | Porsche 911 GT3 R | 323 | +0.9267 |
| 2 | P | 912 | (Germany) Manthey Racing / (Australia) EMA Motorsport | (Australia) Matthew Campbell (France) Mathieu Jaminet (Austria) Thomas Preining | Porsche 4.0 L Flat-6 | 323 | +0.9267 |
| 3 | P | 999 | (Hong Kong) GruppeM Racing | (Germany) Maro Engel (Canada) Mikaël Grenier (Switzerland) Raffaele Marciello | Mercedes-AMG GT3 Evo | 323 | +1.4177 |
| 3 | P | 999 | (Hong Kong) GruppeM Racing | (Germany) Maro Engel (Canada) Mikaël Grenier (Switzerland) Raffaele Marciello | Mercedes-AMG M159 6.2 L V8 | 323 | +1.4177 |
| 4 | P | 32 | (Belgium) Team WRT | (South Africa) Sheldon van der Linde (Belgium) Dries Vanthoor (Belgium) Charles Weerts | BMW M4 GT3 | 323 | +44.7457 |
| 4 | P | 32 | (Belgium) Team WRT | (South Africa) Sheldon van der Linde (Belgium) Dries Vanthoor (Belgium) Charles Weerts | BMW S58B30T0 3.0 L Turbo I6 | 323 | +44.7457 |
| 5 | P | 888 | (Australia) Triple Eight Race Engineering | (Australia) Broc Feeney (Germany) Maximilian Götz (New Zealand) Shane van Gisbergen | Mercedes-AMG GT3 Evo | 322 | +1 Lap |
| 5 | P | 888 | (Australia) Triple Eight Race Engineering | (Australia) Broc Feeney (Germany) Maximilian Götz (New Zealand) Shane van Gisbergen | Mercedes-AMG M159 6.2 L V8 | 322 | +1 Lap |
| 6 | P | 46 | (Belgium) Team WRT | (Brazil) Augusto Farfus (Belgium) Maxime Martin (Italy) Valentino Rossi | BMW M4 GT3 | 322 | +1 Lap |
| 6 | P | 46 | (Belgium) Team WRT | (Brazil) Augusto Farfus (Belgium) Maxime Martin (Italy) Valentino Rossi | BMW S58B30T0 3.0 L Turbo I6 | 322 | +1 Lap |
| 7 | PA | **65** | **(Australia) Melbourne Performance Centre** | **(Australia) Chaz Mostert (Australia) Fraser Ross (Australia) Liam Talbot** | **Audi R8 LMS Evo II** | **321** | **+2 Laps‡** |
| 7 | PA | **65** | **(Australia) Melbourne Performance Centre** | **(Australia) Chaz Mostert (Australia) Fraser Ross (Australia) Liam Talbot** | **Audi DAR 5.2 L V10** | **321** | **+2 Laps‡** |
| 8 | P | 77 | (Hong Kong) Craft-Bamboo Racing | (Netherlands) Nicky Catsburg (Switzerland) Philip Ellis (Spain) Daniel Juncadella | Mercedes-AMG GT3 Evo | 321 | +2 Laps |
| 8 | P | 77 | (Hong Kong) Craft-Bamboo Racing | (Netherlands) Nicky Catsburg (Switzerland) Philip Ellis (Spain) Daniel Juncadella | Mercedes-AMG M159 6.2 L V8 | 321 | +2 Laps |
| 9 | PA | 777 | (Australia) Melbourne Performance Centre | (Switzerland) Ricardo Feller (Germany) Christopher Mies (Australia) Yasser Shahin | Audi R8 LMS Evo II | 320 | +3 Laps |
| 9 | PA | 777 | (Australia) Melbourne Performance Centre | (Switzerland) Ricardo Feller (Germany) Christopher Mies (Australia) Yasser Shahin | Audi DAR 5.2 L V10 | 320 | +3 Laps |
| 10 | PA | 99 | (Australia) Triple Eight Race Engineering | (Malaysia) Prince Jeffri Ibrahim (New Zealand) Richie Stanaway (Australia) Jamie Whincup | Mercedes-AMG GT3 Evo | 319 | +4 Laps |
| 10 | PA | 99 | (Australia) Triple Eight Race Engineering | (Malaysia) Prince Jeffri Ibrahim (New Zealand) Richie Stanaway (Australia) Jamie Whincup | Mercedes-AMG M159 6.2 L V8 | 319 | +4 Laps |
| 11 | PA | 24 | (Australia) Volante Rosso Motorsport | (Australia) Tony Bates (Australia) Jordan Love (Australia) David Reynolds | Mercedes-AMG GT3 Evo | 316 | +7 Laps |
| 11 | PA | 24 | (Australia) Volante Rosso Motorsport | (Australia) Tony Bates (Australia) Jordan Love (Australia) David Reynolds | Mercedes-AMG M159 6.2 L V8 | 316 | +7 Laps |
| 12 | S | **10** | **(New Zealand) International Motorsport** | **(New Zealand) Andrew Fawcet (New Zealand) Daniel Gaunt (Australia) Dylan O'Keeffe** | **Audi R8 LMS Evo II** | **316** | **+7 Laps‡** |
| 12 | S | **10** | **(New Zealand) International Motorsport** | **(New Zealand) Andrew Fawcet (New Zealand) Daniel Gaunt (Australia) Dylan O'Keeffe** | **Audi DAR 5.2 L V10** | **316** | **+7 Laps‡** |
| 13 | PA | 9 | (Australia) Hallmarc Racing | (Australia) Marc Cini (Australia) Dean Fiore (Australia) Lee Holdsworth | Audi R8 LMS Evo II | 316 | +7 Laps |
| 13 | PA | 9 | (Australia) Hallmarc Racing | (Australia) Marc Cini (Australia) Dean Fiore (Australia) Lee Holdsworth | Audi DAR 5.2 L V10 | 316 | +7 Laps |
| 14 | S | 101 | (Australia) Volante Rosso Motorsport | (Hong Kong) Jonathan Hui (Australia) Josh Hunt (Australia) Ross Poulakis (Macau) Kevin Tse | Mercedes-AMG GT3 Evo | 310 | +13 Laps |
| 14 | S | 101 | (Australia) Volante Rosso Motorsport | (Hong Kong) Jonathan Hui (Australia) Josh Hunt (Australia) Ross Poulakis (Macau) Kevin Tse | Mercedes-AMG M159 6.2 L V8 | 310 | +13 Laps |
| 15 | S | 50 | (Australia) M Motorsport / (Australia) Vantage Racing | (Australia) David Crampton (Australia) Trent Harrison (Australia) Glen Wood (Australia) Jayden Ojeda | Audi R8 LMS Evo II | 309 | +14 Laps |
| 15 | S | 50 | (Australia) M Motorsport / (Australia) Vantage Racing | (Australia) David Crampton (Australia) Trent Harrison (Australia) Glen Wood (Australia) Jayden Ojeda | Audi DAR 5.2 L V10 | 309 | +14 Laps |
| 16 | S | 47 | (Australia) Melbourne Performance Centre | (Australia) James Koundouris (Australia) Theo Koundouris (Australia) David Russell (Australia) Jonathon Webb | Audi R8 LMS Evo II | 301 | +22 Laps |
| 16 | S | 47 | (Australia) Melbourne Performance Centre | (Australia) James Koundouris (Australia) Theo Koundouris (Australia) David Russell (Australia) Jonathon Webb | Audi DAR 5.2 L V10 | 301 | +22 Laps |
| 17 | INV | **111** | **(Australia) MRA Motorsport** | **(Australia) Darren Currie (Australia) Grant Donaldson (Australia) Geoff Taunton** | **MARC Mazda 3 V8** | **283** | **+40 Laps‡** |
| 17 | INV | **111** | **(Australia) MRA Motorsport** | **(Australia) Darren Currie (Australia) Grant Donaldson (Australia) Geoff Taunton** | **Ford Coyote 5.0 L V8** | **283** | **+40 Laps‡** |
| DNF | PA | 55 | (Australia) PremiAir Racing / (Australia) Schumacher Motorsport | (Australia) James Golding (Australia) Brad Schumacher (Belgium) Frédéric Vervisch | Audi R8 LMS Evo II | 243 | Engine |
| DNF | PA | 55 | (Australia) PremiAir Racing / (Australia) Schumacher Motorsport | (Australia) James Golding (Australia) Brad Schumacher (Belgium) Frédéric Vervisch | Audi DAR 5.2 L V10 | 243 | Engine |
| DNF | INV | 19 | (Australia) Nineteen Corporation | (Australia) Mark Griffith (Australia) Christian Pancione (Germany) Fabian Schiller | Mercedes-AMG GT4 | 210 | Engine |
| DNF | INV | 19 | (Australia) Nineteen Corporation | (Australia) Mark Griffith (Australia) Christian Pancione (Germany) Fabian Schiller | Mercedes-AMG M178 4.0 L Turbo V8 | 210 | Engine |
| DNF | PA | 222 | (Australia) Scott Taylor Motorsport | (Australia) Alex Davison (Australia) Geoff Emery (Australia) Craig Lowndes (Australia) Scott Taylor | Mercedes-AMG GT3 | 177 | Accident |
| DNF | PA | 222 | (Australia) Scott Taylor Motorsport | (Australia) Alex Davison (Australia) Geoff Emery (Australia) Craig Lowndes (Australia) Scott Taylor | Mercedes-AMG M159 6.2 L V8 | 177 | Accident |
| DNF | S | 44 | (Australia) Valmont Racing | (Australia) Aaron Cameron (Australia) Duvashen Padayachee (Australia) Sergio Pires (Australia) Marcel Zalloua | Mercedes-AMG GT3 Evo | 89 | Accident |
| DNF | S | 44 | (Australia) Valmont Racing | (Australia) Aaron Cameron (Australia) Duvashen Padayachee (Australia) Sergio Pires (Australia) Marcel Zalloua | Mercedes-AMG M159 6.2 L V8 | 89 | Accident |
| DNF | S | 6 | (Australia) Wall Racing | (Australia) Tony D'Alberto (Australia) Adrian Deitz (Australia) Grant Denyer (Australia) David Wall | Lamborghini Huracán GT3 Evo | 70 | Suspension |
| DNF | S | 6 | (Australia) Wall Racing | (Australia) Tony D'Alberto (Australia) Adrian Deitz (Australia) Grant Denyer (Australia) David Wall | Lamborghini DGF 5.2 L V10 | 70 | Suspension |
| DNF | PA | 4 | (Australia) Grove Racing | (Australia) Anton de Pasquale (Australia) Brenton Grove (Australia) Stephen Grove | Porsche 911 GT3 R | 56 | Accident |
| DNF | PA | 4 | (Australia) Grove Racing | (Australia) Anton de Pasquale (Australia) Brenton Grove (Australia) Stephen Grove | Porsche 4.0 L Flat-6 | 56 | Accident |
| DNF | P | 74 | (Australia) Melbourne Performance Centre | (Italy) Mattia Drudi (Germany) Christopher Haase (Switzerland) Patric Niederhauser | Audi R8 LMS Evo II | 13 | Accident |
| DNF | P | 74 | (Australia) Melbourne Performance Centre | (Italy) Mattia Drudi (Germany) Christopher Haase (Switzerland) Patric Niederhauser | Audi DAR 5.2 L V10 | 13 | Accident |
| WD | INV | 66 | (Australia) Daytona Sports Cars | (Australia) Ben Schoots (Australia) Dylan Thomas (Australia) Shane Woodman | SIN R1 GT4 | | Crash in Practice 6 |
| WD | INV | 66 | (Australia) Daytona Sports Cars | (Australia) Ben Schoots (Australia) Dylan Thomas (Australia) Shane Woodman | Chevrolet LS7 7.0 L V8 | | Crash in Practice 6 |
| WD | INV | 52 | (Papua New Guinea) Wheels FX Racing | (Papua New Guinea) Keith Kassulke (Australia) Hadrian Morrall (Australia) Cameron McLeod | MARC II V8 | | Crash in Practice 4 |
| WD | INV | 52 | (Papua New Guinea) Wheels FX Racing | (Papua New Guinea) Keith Kassulke (Australia) Hadrian Morrall (Australia) Cameron McLeod | Ford Modular 5.2 L V8 | | Crash in Practice 4 |
OFFICIAL RESULTS

== Notes ==
Intercontinental GT Challenge
| Previous race: 2022 Gulf 12 Hours (December) | 2023 season | Next race: 2023 Kyalami 9 Hours |
