= Jonathan Hui =

Hong Kong racing driver

許建德 Jonathan Hui
- Nationality: Hong Kong
- Born: Hong Kong

GT World Challenge Europe career
- Debut season: 2021
- Current team: Sky Tempesta Racing
- Categorisation: FIA Bronze
- Car number: 93

Previous series
- 2017 2019: 24H Series; GT World Challenge Europe Endurance Cup

Championship titles
- 2021, 2023, 2023: GT World Challenge Europe Endurance Cup Pro-Am, Intercontinental GT Challenge Independent Cup

Jonathan Hui Kin-tak (Chinese: 許建德) is a Hong Kong businessman and racing driver. He is the grandson of Hui Sai-fun, the former chairman of the board of directors of Central Development Limited, and the son of Hui Jinqian. Hui has also served as a director of BRADFORD ENTERPRISES LIMITED. On October 30, 2021, Hui and Chris Froggatt won the annual GT World Challenge Europe Endurance Cup driver's championship in the Pro-Am category. Hui himself became the first Hong Kong racer to win that championship.

== Career ==
Hui first came into contact with racing in Canada around 1996, and discovered his interest in this sport from track days. It was not until 2000 that he returned to Hong Kong and formally received training from Formula Campus, which was very popular in China at the time. In 2004, he participated in the annual Super Car Challenge (later renamed Asia GT) for the first time. The car that he used was a Subaru WRX, while his opponents drove cars such as Ferrari 360CS and Porsche 911. However, with constant efforts, he used a Japanese sports car to stand on the podium for the first time in the fifth round and finished third.

At the 2018 Dubai 24 Hour, BLACK FALCON Team TMD Friction, composed of Frank Yu, Antares Au, Hui and Macau driver Kevin Tse, achieved good results. They drove in Mercedes-AMG GT4 and competed in the GT4 class where they completed 548 laps, finishing in third place in the GT4 class, ranking 31st overall.

In mid-2018, for the January 2019 race, Hui personally traveled to tracks he had never driven before, including Monza, Paul Ricard and Spa-Francorchamps, and hired coaches to provide him with focused training. At the same time, he also asked Ouyang Ruoxi for advice on driving a racing simulator to prepare lessons for each trip to a different track.

=== 2020 ===
On 13 September 2020, Hui and Formula One alum Giancarlo Fisichella drove the No. 92 Sky Tempesta Racing Ferrari 488 GT3 Evo in the Pro-Am category. He participated in the GT World Challenge Europe sprint race for the first time and won two consecutive races at the French circuit Magny-Cours. On 18–19 September, in the Road to Le Mans race event held in Le Mans, France, Hui teamed with Chris Froggatt and took turns driving Sky Tempesta Racing's Ferrari 488 GT3 Evo car in the two qualifying sessions. Ranked 7th and 5th in the GT3 category, the two finished fourth in the first race and third in the second race. Hui, Froggatt, Eddie Cheever III and Fisichella entered in the Pro-Am class at the 24 Hours of Spa in Belgium on 24–25 October. The four took turns driving the No. 93 The Sky Tempesta Racing Team's Ferrari 488 GT3 Evo where they finished second. Hui thus became the first Hong Kong driver finish on the podium since the event was held in 1924.

=== 2021 ===
On 29 May 2021, Hui, Froggatt and Cheever drove a Ferrari 488 GT3 and successfully won the Pro-Am category of the Paul Ricard 1000km. This victory kept Sky Tempesta Racing's hopes of competing for the annual championship alive, with the team accumulating 39 points in the standings and ranking third in the class. Hui, Froggatt and Cheever, who were joined by Italian driver Matteo Cressoni, entered the 24 Hours of Spa. Unfortunately, the team was overtaken in the last hour due to a sudden thunderstorm, and finally crossed the line in fourth place. However, in terms of overall results, the Sky Tempesta Racing team scored enough points to rise to the top of the endurance race Pro-Am category with a 17-point advantage.

On September 5, Hui, together with his team Sky Tempesta Racing teammates Rino Mastronardi and Chris Froggatt, competed in the penultimate race of the season of the GT World Challenge Europe endurance race at the Nürburgring GP circuit. He later caught up and finally crossed the line in second place. With that result, Sky Tempesta Racing scored 19 points and successfully expanded its lead in the Pro-Am class standings. The 2021 GT World Challenge Europe season had its season finale on 10 October. The Sky Tempesta Racing team, which brought together Hui, Froggatt, Mastronardi and Cheever, successfully stood out from the 13 participating world-class teams and successfully locked in the Pro-Am group after five rounds. In addition, Hui and Froggatt also won the annual driver's championship in the Pro-Am category, and Hui became the first Hong Kong driver to win the GT World Challenge European category championship.

=== 2022 ===
At the 2022 24 Hours of Spa, the No. 93 Sky Tempesta Racing Mercedes-AMG GT3 driven by Hui finished in third place in the Gold Cup. However, his compatriot, Antares, collided with Hui's car three hours into the race and had to withdraw from the race early. After the race, Hui said regretfully: "It was a joy to be on the podium at the Spa 24 Hours, but I made a mistake because I misunderstood that the race had restarted, which led to me bumping into my friend. Another Hong Kong driver, Au Tin Chun, caused the opponent to withdraw. This accident is entirely my responsibility, and I sincerely apologize to Au Tin Chun and all other Herberth Motorsport team members."

=== 2023 ===
Hui teamed up with Kevin Tse and Australian driver Ross Poulakis to form a three-person team to drive the Harrolds Volante Rosso Motorsport team's No. 101 Mercedes-AMG GT3 to participate in the 2023 Bathurst 12 Hour. This circuit is also the site of the first round of the 2023 Intercontinental GT Challenge, which took place from 3 to 5 February.

== Motorsport results ==
=== Complete 24 Hours of Le Mans results ===
| Year | Team | Co-Drivers | Car | Class | Laps | Pos. | Class Pos. |
|---|---|---|---|---|---|---|---|
| 2025 | (United Kingdom) Ziggo Sport – Tempesta | (Italy) Eddie Cheever III (United Kingdom) Chris Froggatt | Ferrari 296 GT3 | LMGT3 | 335 | 46th | 14th |
