= Brenton Grove =

Australian racing driver

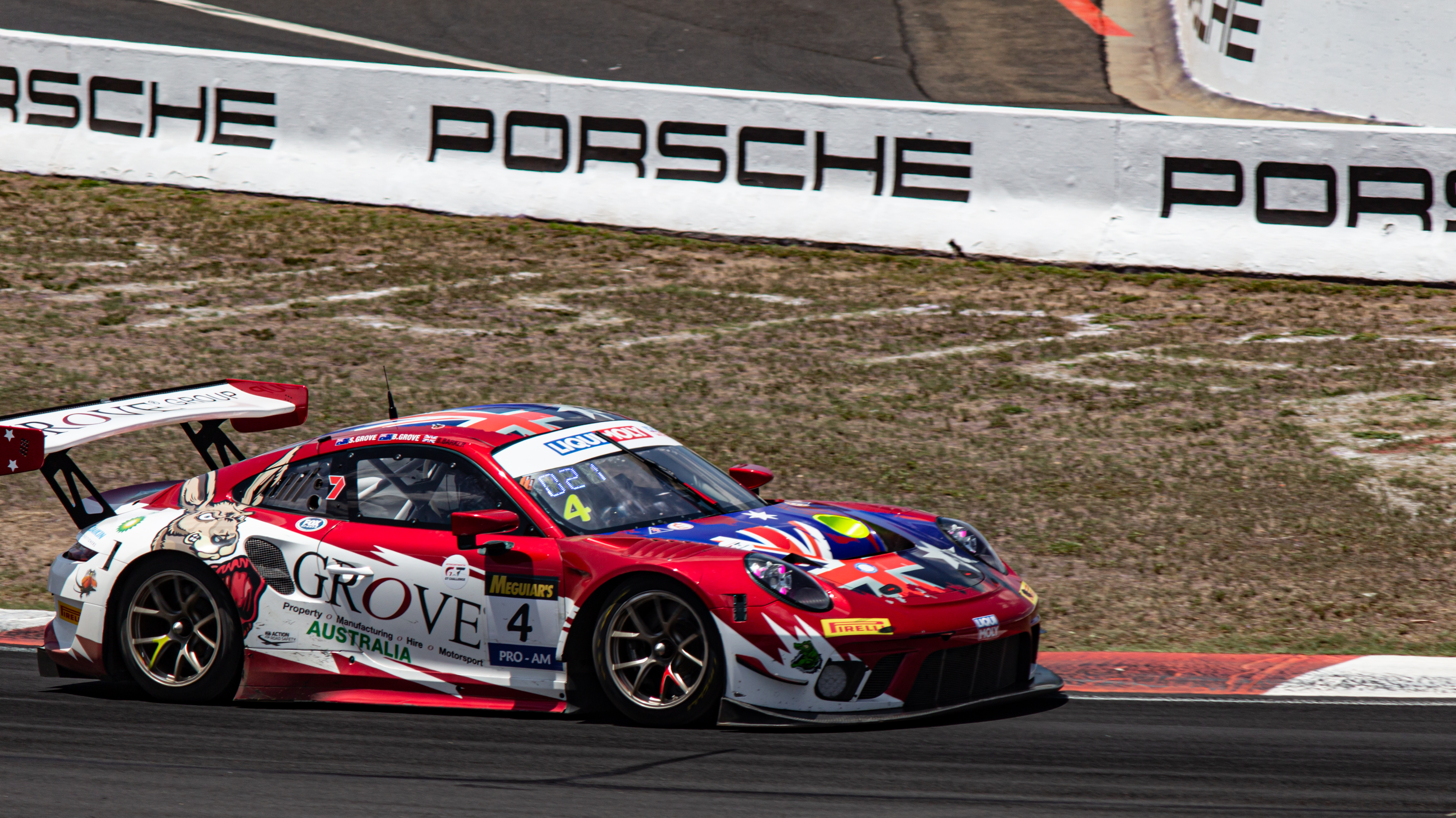
- Grove at the 2020 Bathurst 12 Hour
- Nationality: Australian
- Born: 9 April 1997 (age 29) Melbourne, Victoria
- Relatives: Stephen Grove (father)

Super2 Series
- Categorisation: FIA Silver
- Years active: 2018–2019
- Teams: Grove Motorsport; Triple Eight Race Engineering
- Starts: 29
- Wins: 0
- Podiums: 1
- Poles: 0
- Fastest laps: 0
- Best finish: 8th in 2019

Previous series
- 2014,2017 2016: Porsche GT3 Cup Aust. Formula 4 Australia
Medal record
GT3
Representing Australia
FIA Motorsport Games
Bronze medal – third place	2019 Rome	GT Cup

Brenton Lee Grove (born 9 April 1997) is a racing driver from Australia. He currently competes in the 2021 GT World Challenge Australia for Grove Racing. During the 2019 season, Grove and his father Stephen represented Australia in the 2019 FIA Motorsport Games GT Cup, finishing third overall.

== Racing record ==
=== Career summary ===
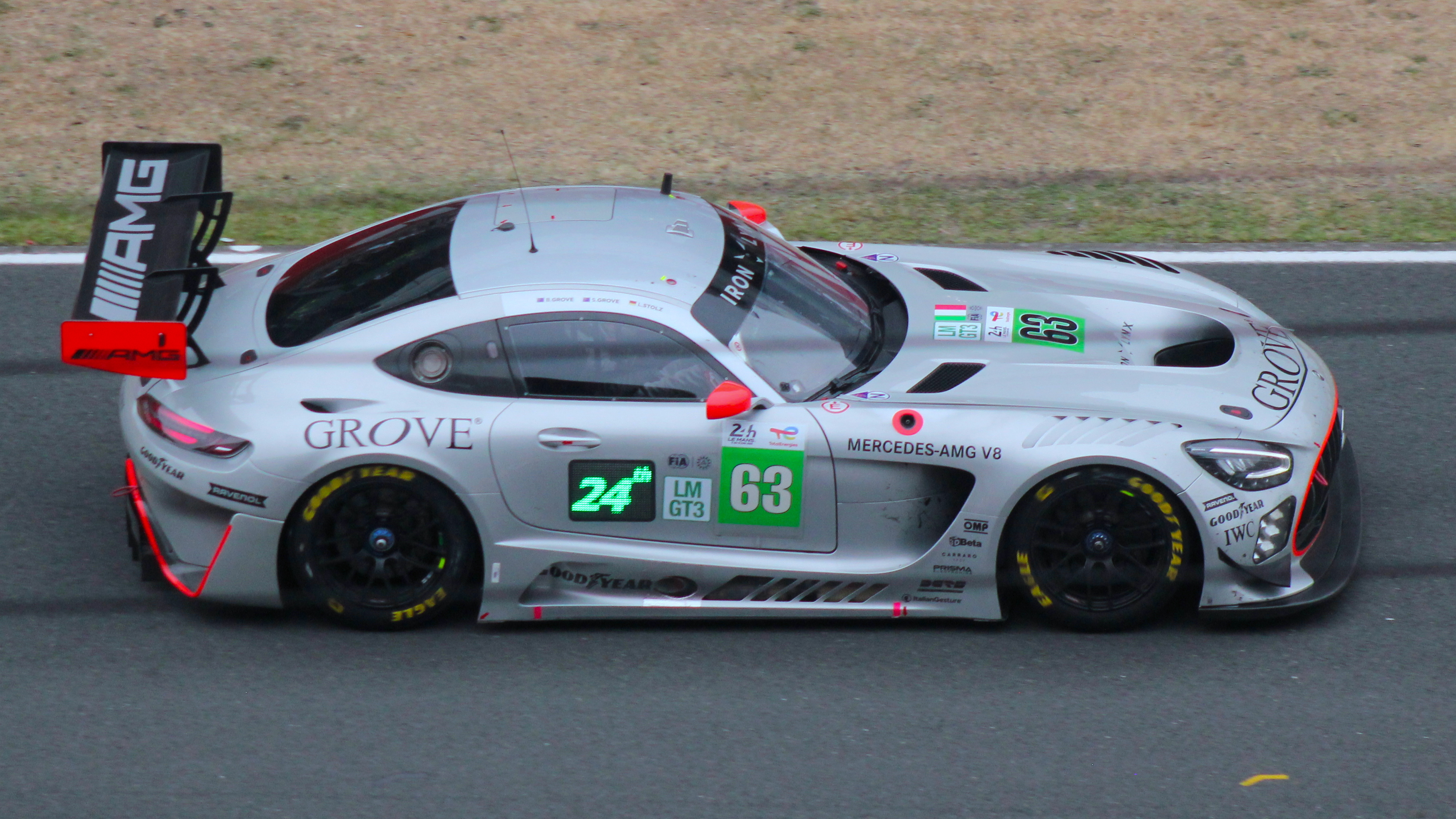
Grove's No. 63 car at the 2025 24 Hours of Le Mans

Season	Series	Team	Races	Wins	Poles	F/Laps	Podiums	Points	Position
2014	Porsche GT3 Cup Challenge Australia	Grove Group	3	0	0	0	0	14	29th
2014	Victorian Porsche 944 Challenge	Grove Group	6	0	0	0	0	36	21st
2015	Victorian Sports Car Championship	Grove Group	3	0	0	1	0	63	17th
2016	Australian Formula 4 Championship	Team BRM	18	1	0	0	1	93	9th
2017	Porsche GT3 Cup Challenge Australia	Grove Motorsport	18	3	1	1	15	218	**2nd**
2017	Porsche Carrera Cup Australia	Porsche Centre Melbourne	6	0	0	0	0	146	13th
2018	Super2 Series	Grove Racing	15	0	0	0	0	615	21st
2018	FIA GT Nations Cup	Team Australia	3	0	0	0	0	N/A	DNF
2018-19	NZ Touring Cars Championship - Class 1	Richards Team Motorsport	18	0	0	1	7	867	4th
2019	Super2 Series	Triple Eight Race Engineering	14	0	0	0	1	1062	8th
2019	FIA Motorsport Games GT Cup	Team Australia	3	0	0	0	1	N/A	**3rd**
2019	Porsche Carrera Cup Australia	Grove Motorsport	3	0	0	0	0	66	25th
2019	Porsche Supercup	MRS Cup-Racing	1	0	0	0	0	0	34th
2021	GT World Challenge Australia - Pro-Am	Grove Motorsport	8	0	1	0	3	111	4th
2022	GT World Challenge Australia - Pro-Am	Grove Motorsport							
2022	GT World Challenge Europe Endurance Cup	EBM Grove Racing	1	0	0	0	0	0	NC
2022	Intercontinental GT Challenge	Grove Racing							
2022	Intercontinental GT Challenge	EBM Giga Racing							
2022	24H GT Series - GT3	Grove Motorsport by Herberth Motorsport							
2022	FIA Motorsport Games GT Cup	Team Australia	1	0	0	0	0	N/A	7th
2022-23	Middle East Trophy - GT3	EBM – Grove Racing							
2023	GT World Challenge Australia - Pro-Am	Grove Racing							
2023	GT World Challenge Europe Endurance Cup	Grove Racing	1	0	0	0	0	0	NC
2023	Intercontinental GT Challenge	Grove Racing	5	0	0	0	0	14	22nd
2023-24	Middle East Trophy - GT3	EBM – Grove Racing							
2024	GT World Challenge Australia - Pro-Am	EBM – Grove Racing	6	0	0	1	1	41	9th
2024	24H Series - GT3	Grove Racing							
2024	Gulf 12 Hours	2 Seas – Grove Racing	1	0	0	0	0	N/A	17th
2025	24H Series - GT3	Iron Lynx – Grove Racing							
2025	International GT Open	Iron Lynx – Grove Racing	2	0	0	0	0	0	67th
2025	FIA World Endurance Championship - LMGT3	Iron Lynx							
2025	Gulf 12 Hours	Grove Racing by GetSpeed	1	0	0	0	1	N/A	**3rd**
2025-26	24H Series Middle East - GT3	Grove Racing by GetSpeed							

=== Complete Australian Formula 4 Championship results ===
(key) (Races in bold indicate pole position) (Races in italics indicate fastest lap)

Year	Team	1	2	3	4	5	6	7	8	9	10	11	12	13	14	15	16	17	18	DC	Points
2016	Team BRM	SYM; 1; 1	SYM; 2; 8	SYM; 3; 8	PHI; 1; 9	PHI; 2; 8	PHI; 3; 9	SMP; 1; 11	SMP; 2; 6	SMP; 3; 7	QLD; 1 Ret	QLD; 2; 9	QLD; 3; 6	SAN; 1; 7	SAN; 2; 8	SAN; 3; 5	SUR; 1 Ret	SUR; 2 Ret	SUR; 3; 7	9th	93

=== Complete Super2 Series results ===
(key) (Round results only)

Super2 Series results
Year	Team	Car	1	2	3	4	5	6	7	Position	Points
2018	Grove Motorsport	Holden VF Commodore	ADE; 21	SYM; 17	BAR; 21	TOW; 22	SAN; 18	BAT; 10	NEW; 20	21st	615
2019	Triple Eight Race Engineering	Holden VF Commodore	ADE; 16	BAR; 16	TOW; 4	QLD; 16	BAT; 4	SAN; 14	NEW; 8	8th	1062

=== Complete Bathurst 12 Hour results ===
Year	Team	Co-drivers	Car	Class	Laps	Pos.	Class pos.
2018	(Australia) Grove Motorsport	(Australia) Stephen Grove (United Kingdom) Ben Barker (New Zealand) Daniel Gaunt	Porsche 991 GT3 Cup	B	260	17th	**1st**
2019	(Australia) Grove Motorsport	(Australia) Stephen Grove (United Kingdom) Ben Barker	Porsche 991 GT3 Cup	B	299	16th	**1st**
2020	(Australia) Grove Motorsport	(Australia) Stephen Grove (United Kingdom) Ben Barker	Porsche 911 GT3 R	Pro-Am	312	10th	**1st**
2022	(Australia) Grove Racing	(Australia) Stephen Grove (United Kingdom) Ben Barker	Porsche 911 GT3 R	Pro-Am	197	DNF	DNF
2023	(Australia) Grove Racing	(Australia) Anton de Pasquale (Australia) Stephen Grove	Porsche 911 GT3 R	A	56	DNF	DNF
2025	(Australia) Grove Racing	(Germany) Fabian Schiller (Australia) Stephen Grove	Mercedes-AMG GT3 Evo	B	53	DNF	DNF

=== 24 Hours of Le Mans results ===
Year	Team	Co-Drivers	Car	Class	Laps	Pos.	Class Pos.
2025	(Italy) Iron Lynx	(Australia) Stephen Grove (Germany) Luca Stolz	Mercedes AMG GT3 Evo	LMGT3	334	47th	15th
