= 2021 3 Hours of Monza =

(Italy) 2021 Monza 3 Hours
Event Information
- Round 1 of 5 in the 2021 GT World Challenge Europe Endurance Cup
- Date: 16–18 April 2021 GT World Challenge Europe Endurance Cup
- Location: Monza, Lombardy, Italy
- Venue: Autodromo Nazionale di Monza
- Weather: Wet

Results
Race 1
Distance	79 laps	457.647 km
Pole position	(Italy) Mirko Bortolotti (Italy) Marco Mapelli (Italy) Andrea Caldarelli; FFF Racing Team	1:47.006
Winner	(Italy) Matteo Cairoli (Germany) Christian Engelhart (Austria) Klaus Bachler; Dinamic Motorsport	3:01:27.213

The 2021 GT World Challenge Europe 3 Hours of Monza was an endurance motor race for the GT World Challenge Europe Endurance Cup, the first race of the 2021 GT World Challenge Europe Endurance Cup, held on 18 April 2021 at the Autodromo Nazionale di Monza in Monza, Italy.

== Classification ==
=== Qualifying ===
Pos.	#	Drivers	Team	Car	Class	Individual	Combined	Gap
1	63	(Italy) Mirko Bortolotti (Italy) Marco Mapelli (Italy) Andrea Caldarelli	(China) FFF Racing Team	Lamborghini Huracán GT3 Evo	P	1:46.949; 1:47.341; 1:46.729	1:47.006	
2	88	(France) Jules Gounon (Spain) Daniel Juncadella (Italy) Raffaele Marciello	(France) AKKA ASP	Mercedes-AMG GT3 Evo	P	1:47.223; 1:47.375; 1:46.442	1:47.013	+0.007
3	71	(Italy) Antonio Fuoco (United Kingdom) Callum Ilott (Italy) Davide Rigon	(Italy) Iron Lynx	Ferrari 488 GT3 Evo	P	1:47.114; 1:46.972; 1:47.220	1:47.102	+0.096
4	32	(Belgium) Charles Weerts (Belgium) Dries Vanthoor (South Africa) Kelvin van der Linde	(Belgium) Team WRT	Audi R8 LMS Evo	P	1:47.225; 1:47.192; 1:47.097	1:47.171	+0.165
5	22	(Australia) Matthew Campbell (New Zealand) Earl Bamber (France) Mathieu Jaminet	(United Arab Emirates) GPX Martini Racing	Porsche 911 GT3 R	P	1:47.748; 1:47.422; 1:46.795	1:47.321	+0.315
6	163	(Italy) Giacomo Altoè (Spain) Albert Costa (Austria) Norbert Siedler	(Switzerland) Emil Frey Racing	Lamborghini Huracán GT3 Evo	P	1:47.805; 1:47.240; 1:46.966	1:47.337	+0.331
7	14	(Switzerland) Alex Fontana (Switzerland) Rolf Ineichen (Switzerland) Ricardo Feller	(Switzerland) Emil Frey Racing	Lamborghini Huracán GT3 Evo	S	1:47.469; 1:47.939; 1:46.680	1:47.362	+0.356
8	51	(Italy) Alessandro Pier Guidi (Denmark) Nicklas Nielsen (France) Côme Ledogar	(Italy) Iron Lynx	Ferrari 488 GT3 Evo	P	1:47.681; 1:47.455; 1:47.045	1:47.393	+0.387
9	4	(Germany) Maro Engel (Germany) Luca Stolz (Monaco) Vincent Abril	(Germany) Haupt Racing Team	Mercedes-AMG GT3 Evo	P	1:47.710; 1:47.385; 1:47.129	1:47.408	+0.402
10	34	(Germany) Marco Wittmann (South Africa) Sheldon van der Linde (United Kingdom) David Pittard	(Germany) Walkenhorst Motorsport	BMW M6 GT3	P	1:47.521; 1:47.398; 1:47.310	1:47.409	+0.403
11	87	(France) Thomas Drouet (Russia) Konstantin Tereshchenko (France) Simon Gachet	(France) AKKA ASP	Mercedes-AMG GT3 Evo	S	1:47.878; 1:47.424; 1:47.186	1:47.496	+0.490
12	54	(Italy) Matteo Cairoli (Germany) Christian Engelhart (Austria) Klaus Bachler	(Italy) Dinamic Motorsport	Porsche 911 GT3 R	P	1:47.791; 1:47.624; 1:47.353	1:47.589	+0.583
13	7	(Germany) Marvin Dienst (France) Paul Petit (Colombia) Óscar Tunjo	(Germany) Toksport	Mercedes-AMG GT3 Evo	S	1:47.692; 1:48.375; 1:46.797	1:47.621	+0.615
14	114	(United Kingdom) Jack Aitken (Finland) Konsta Lappalainen (France) Arthur Rougier	(Switzerland) Emil Frey Racing	Lamborghini Huracán GT3 Evo	P	1:48.080; 1:47.996; 1:47.044	1:47.706	+0.700
15	35	(Germany) Timo Glock (France) Thomas Neubauer (Germany) Martin Tomczyk	(Germany) Walkenhorst Motorsport	BMW M6 GT3	P	1:48.257; 1:47.806; 1:47.103	1:47.722	+0.716
16	31	(United Kingdom) Frank Bird (Japan) Ryuichiro Tomita (Denmark) Valdemar Eriksen	(Belgium) Team WRT	Audi R8 LMS Evo	S	1:47.819; 1:47.364; 1:48.062	1:47.748	+0.742
17	38	(United Kingdom) Ben Barnicoat (United Kingdom) Rob Bell (United Kingdom) Oliver Wilkinson	(United Kingdom) Jota Sport	McLaren 720S GT3	P	1:47.609; 1:48.392; 1:47.390	1:47.797	+0.791
18	30	(Denmark) Benjamin Goethe (United Kingdom) Stuart Hall (United Kingdom) James Pull	(Belgium) Team WRT	Audi R8 LMS Evo	S	1:47.926; 1:48.001; 1:47.593	1:47.840	+0.834
19	57	(United States) Russell Ward (Canada) Mikaël Grenier (United Kingdom) Philip Ellis	(United States) Winward Motorsport	Mercedes-AMG GT3 Evo	S	1:48.697; 1:47.691; 1:47.237	1:47.875	+0.869
20	26	(Belgium) Frédéric Vervisch (Germany) Markus Winkelhock (United Kingdom) Finlay Hutchison	(France) Saintéloc Racing	Audi R8 LMS Evo	P	1:48.008; 1:48.432; 1:47.232	1:47.890	+0.884
21	25	(France) Alexandre Cougnaud (Germany) Christopher Haase (France) Adrien Tambay	(France) Saintéloc Racing	Audi R8 LMS Evo	P	1:48.120; 1:48.241; 1:47.311	1:47.890	+0.884
22	99	(Germany) Alex Aka (Germany) Dennis Marschall (Italy) Tommaso Mosca	(Germany) Attempto Racing	Audi R8 LMS Evo	S	1:48.102; 1:48.451; 1:47.414	1:47.989	+0.983
23	66	(Italy) Mattia Drudi (Germany) Kim-Luis Schramm (Germany) Christopher Mies	(Germany) Attempto Racing	Audi R8 LMS Evo	P	1:48.065; 1:47.866; 1:48.057	1:47.996	+0.990
24	56	(France) Romain Dumas (Denmark) Mikkel Pedersen (Italy) Andrea Rizzoli	(Italy) Dinamic Motorsport	Porsche 911 GT3 R	P	1:48.693; 1:47.622; 1:47.687	1:48.000	+0.994
25	159	(France) Valentin Hasse-Clot (Denmark) Nicolai Kjærgaard (United Kingdom) Alex MacDowall	(United Kingdom) Garage 59	Aston Martin Vantage AMR GT3	S	1:48.559; 1:48.207; 1:47.372	1:48.046	+1.040
26	70	(United States) Brendan Iribe (United Kingdom) Oliver Millroy	(United Kingdom) Inception Racing	McLaren 720S GT3	PA	1:47.891; 1:48.509; 1:47.938	1:48.112	+1.106
27	107	(France) Nelson Panciatici (France) Gilles Vannelet (South Africa) Stuart White	(France) Classic and Modern Racing	Bentley Continental GT3	PA	1:49.137; 1:47.757; 1:47.485	1:48.126	+1.120
28	16	(Italy) Emilian Galbiati (Austria) Clemens Schmid (Germany) Tim Zimmermann	(Austria) GRT Grasser Racing Team	Lamborghini Huracán GT3 Evo	S	1:48.334; 1:48.030; 1:48.333	1:48.232	+1.226
29	33	(Chile) Benjamin Hites (Finland) Patrick Kujala	(Germany) Rinaldi Racing	Ferrari 488 GT3 Evo	S	1:48.663; 1:48.360; 1:47.719	1:48.247	+1.241
30	188	(Sweden) Alexander West (United Kingdom) Chris Goodwin (United Kingdom) Jonathan Adam	(United Kingdom) Garage 59	Aston Martin Vantage AMR GT3	PA	1:49.344; 1:48.460; 1:47.130	1:48.311	+1.305
31	2	(Germany) Nico Bastian (Luxembourg) Olivier Grotz (Germany) Florian Scholze	(Germany) GetSpeed Performance	Mercedes-AMG GT3 Evo	PA	1:48.094; 1:48.952; 1:48.125	1:48.390	+1.384
32	52	(Italy) Andrea Bertolini (Switzerland) Lorenzo Bontempelli (Belgium) Louis Machiels	(Italy) AF Corse	Ferrari 488 GT3 Evo	PA	1:49.066; 1:48.605; 1:47.596	1:48.422	+1.416
33	19	(United Kingdom) Phil Keen (Japan) Hiroshi Hamaguchi	(China) FFF Racing Team	Lamborghini Huracán GT3 Evo	PA	1:47.865; 1:48.690; 1:48.954	1:48.503	+1.497
34	69	(United Kingdom) Rob Collard (United Kingdom) Sam de Haan (United Kingdom) Callum MacLeod	(United Kingdom) Ram Racing	Mercedes-AMG GT3 Evo	PA	1:49.065; 1:48.553; 1:48.158	1:48.592	+1.586
35	5	(Germany) Patrick Assenheimer (Germany) Hubert Haupt (Mexico) Ricardo Sanchez	(Germany) Haupt Racing Team	Mercedes-AMG GT3 Evo	S	1:49.055; 1:48.397; 1:48.397	1:48.616	+1.610
36	77	(Switzerland) Adrian Amstutz (Portugal) Henrique Chaves (Portugal) Miguel Ramos	(United Kingdom) Barwell Motorsport	Lamborghini Huracán GT3 Evo	PA	1:49.845; 1:48.629; 1:47.558	1:48.677	+1.671
37	93	(United Kingdom) Chris Froggatt (Italy) Eddie Cheever III (Germany) Stefan Görig	(United Kingdom) Tempesta Racing	Ferrari 488 GT3 Evo	PA	1:48.685; 1:50.190; 1:47.358	1:48.744	+1.738
38	40	(Switzerland) Niklas Born (Australia) Jordan Love (Switzerland) Yannick Mettler	(Germany) SPS Automotive Performance	Mercedes-AMG GT3 Evo	S	1:49.089; 1:48.579; 1:48.704	1:48.790	+1.784
39	20	(Austria) Dominik Baumann (Germany) Valentin Pierburg	(Germany) SPS Automotive Performance	Mercedes-AMG GT3 Evo	PA	1:48.124; 1:49.368; 1:49.095	1:48.862	+1.856
40	10	(Saudi Arabia) Karim Ojjeh (Germany) Jens Klingmann (Germany) Jens Liebhauser	(Belgium) Boutsen Ginion Racing	BMW M6 GT3	PA	1:50.531; 1:49.275; 1:47.940	1:49.248	+2.242
41	11	(Italy) Giorgio Roda (Germany) Tim Kohmann (Italy) Francesco Zollo	(Switzerland) Kessel Racing	Ferrari 488 GT3 Evo	PA	1:48.933; 1:51.875; 1:48.604	1:49.804	+2.798
42^{1}	90	(Argentina) Ezequiel Pérez Companc (Netherlands) Rik Breukers	(Argentina) MadPanda Motorsport	Mercedes-AMG GT3 Evo	S	1:48.123; 1:47.126; No time	1:47.624	+0.618
WD^{2}	222	(Switzerland) Julien Apotheloz (Germany) Jan Kasperlik (Austria) Nicolas Schöll	(Germany) Allied Racing	Porsche 911 GT3 R	PA	No time No time No time	No time	

- ^1 – The #90 MadPanda Motorsport entry only set a valid time in 2 of the 3 sessions, requiring it to start behind all entries that had set a valid time in all 3 sessions.
- ^2 – The #222 Allied Racing entry crashed in pre-qualifying and was withdrawn from the event.

=== Race ===
Pos.	#	Drivers	Team	Car	Class	Laps	Time/Gap/Retired	Points
1	54	(Italy) Matteo Cairoli (Germany) Christian Engelhart (Austria) Klaus Bachler	(Italy) Dinamic Motorsport	Porsche 911 GT3 R	P	79	3:01:27.213	25
2	88	(France) Jules Gounon (Spain) Daniel Juncadella (Italy) Raffaele Marciello	(France) AKKA ASP	Mercedes-AMG GT3 Evo	P	79	+2.886	18
3	14	(Switzerland) Alex Fontana (Switzerland) Rolf Ineichen (Switzerland) Ricardo Feller	(Switzerland) Emil Frey Racing	Lamborghini Huracán GT3 Evo	S	79	+3.141	25
4	71	(Italy) Antonio Fuoco (United Kingdom) Callum Ilott (Italy) Davide Rigon	(Italy) Iron Lynx	Ferrari 488 GT3 Evo	P	79	+3.613	15
5	51	(Italy) Alessandro Pier Guidi (Denmark) Nicklas Nielsen (France) Côme Ledogar	(Italy) Iron Lynx	Ferrari 488 GT3 Evo	P	79	+7.799	12
6	30	(Denmark) Benjamin Goethe (United Kingdom) Stuart Hall (United Kingdom) James Pull	(Belgium) Team WRT	Audi R8 LMS Evo	S	79	+15.607	18
7	57	(United States) Russell Ward (Canada) Mikaël Grenier (United Kingdom) Philip Ellis	(United States) Winward Motorsport	Mercedes-AMG GT3 Evo	S	79	+19.506	15
8	31	(United Kingdom) Frank Bird (Japan) Ryuichiro Tomita (Denmark) Valdemar Eriksen	(Belgium) Team WRT	Audi R8 LMS Evo	S	79	+23.391	12
9	26	(Belgium) Frédéric Vervisch (Germany) Markus Winkelhock (United Kingdom) Finlay Hutchison	(France) Saintéloc Racing	Audi R8 LMS Evo	P	79	+26.060	10
10	56	(France) Romain Dumas (Denmark) Mikkel Pedersen (Italy) Andrea Rizzoli	(Italy) Dinamic Motorsport	Porsche 911 GT3 R	P	79	+33.042	8
11	87	(France) Thomas Drouet (Russia) Konstantin Tereshchenko (France) Simon Gachet	(France) AKKA ASP	Mercedes-AMG GT3 Evo	S	79	+34.062	10
12	66	(Italy) Mattia Drudi (Germany) Kim-Luis Schramm (Germany) Christopher Mies	(Germany) Attempto Racing	Audi R8 LMS Evo	P	79	+44.844	6
13	4	(Germany) Maro Engel (Germany) Luca Stolz (Monaco) Vincent Abril	(Germany) Haupt Racing Team	Mercedes-AMG GT3 Evo	P	79	+45.172	4
14	188	(Sweden) Alexander West (United Kingdom) Chris Goodwin (United Kingdom) Jonathan Adam	(United Kingdom) Garage 59	Aston Martin Vantage AMR GT3	PA	79	+49.410	25
15	99	(Germany) Alex Aka (Germany) Dennis Marschall (Italy) Tommaso Mosca	(Germany) Attempto Racing	Audi R8 LMS Evo	S	79	+55.224	8
16	19	(United Kingdom) Phil Keen (Japan) Hiroshi Hamaguchi	(China) FFF Racing Team	Lamborghini Huracán GT3 Evo	PA	79	+56.939	18
17	33	(Chile) Benjamin Hites (Finland) Patrick Kujala	(Germany) Rinaldi Racing	Ferrari 488 GT3 Evo	S	79	+1:04.867	6
18	40	(Switzerland) Niklas Born (Australia) Jordan Love (Switzerland) Yannick Mettler	(Germany) SPS Automotive Performance	Mercedes-AMG GT3 Evo	S	79	+1:05.381	4
19	159	(France) Valentin Hasse-Clot (Denmark) Nicolai Kjærgaard (United Kingdom) Alex MacDowall	(United Kingdom) Garage 59	Aston Martin Vantage AMR GT3	S	79	+1:12.044	2
20	7	(Germany) Marvin Dienst (France) Paul Petit (Colombia) Óscar Tunjo	(Germany) Toksport	Mercedes-AMG GT3 Evo	S	79	+1:12.372	1
21	77	(Switzerland) Adrian Amstutz (Portugal) Henrique Chaves (Portugal) Miguel Ramos	(United Kingdom) Barwell Motorsport	Lamborghini Huracán GT3 Evo	PA	79	+1:17.049	15
22	5	(Germany) Patrick Assenheimer (Germany) Hubert Haupt (Mexico) Ricardo Sanchez	(Germany) Haupt Racing Team	Mercedes-AMG GT3 Evo	S	79	+1:28.082	
23	163	(Italy) Giacomo Altoè (Spain) Albert Costa (Austria) Norbert Siedler	(Switzerland) Emil Frey Racing	Lamborghini Huracán GT3 Evo	P	78	+1 lap	2
24	63	(Italy) Mirko Bortolotti (Italy) Marco Mapelli (Italy) Andrea Caldarelli	(China) FFF Racing Team	Lamborghini Huracán GT3 Evo	P	78	+1 lap	1+1
25	2	(Germany) Nico Bastian (Luxembourg) Olivier Grotz (Germany) Florian Scholze	(Germany) GetSpeed Performance	Mercedes-AMG GT3 Evo	PA	78	+1 lap	12
26	34	(Germany) Marco Wittmann (South Africa) Sheldon van der Linde (United Kingdom) David Pittard	(Germany) Walkenhorst Motorsport	BMW M6 GT3	P	78	+1 lap	
27	16	(Italy) Emilian Galbiati (Austria) Clemens Schmid (Germany) Tim Zimmermann	(Austria) GRT Grasser Racing Team	Lamborghini Huracán GT3 Evo	S	78	+1 lap	
28	20	(Austria) Dominik Baumann (Germany) Valentin Pierburg	(Germany) SPS Automotive Performance	Mercedes-AMG GT3 Evo	PA	78	+1 lap	10
29	52	(Italy) Andrea Bertolini (Switzerland) Lorenzo Bontempelli (Belgium) Louis Machiels	(Italy) AF Corse	Ferrari 488 GT3 Evo	PA	78	+1 lap	8
30	93	(United Kingdom) Chris Froggatt (Italy) Eddie Cheever III (Germany) Stefan Görig	(United Kingdom) Tempesta Racing	Ferrari 488 GT3 Evo	PA	78	+1 lap	6
31	107	(France) Nelson Panciatici (France) Gilles Vannelet (South Africa) Stuart White	(France) Classic and Modern Racing	Bentley Continental GT3	PA	77	+2 laps	4
32	35	(Germany) Timo Glock (France) Thomas Neubauer (Germany) Martin Tomczyk	(Germany) Walkenhorst Motorsport	BMW M6 GT3	P	75	+4 laps	
DNF	10	(Saudi Arabia) Karim Ojjeh (Germany) Jens Klingmann (Germany) Jens Liebhauser	(Belgium) Boutsen Ginion Racing	BMW M6 GT3	PA	52	Puncture	
DNF	90	(Argentina) Ezequiel Pérez Companc (Netherlands) Rik Breukers	(Argentina) MadPanda Motorsport	Mercedes-AMG GT3 Evo	S	49		
DNF	114	(United Kingdom) Jack Aitken (Finland) Konsta Lappalainen (France) Arthur Rougier	(Switzerland) Emil Frey Racing	Lamborghini Huracán GT3 Evo	P	40		
DNF	32	(Belgium) Charles Weerts (Belgium) Dries Vanthoor (South Africa) Kelvin van der Linde	(Belgium) Team WRT	Audi R8 LMS Evo	P	29	Puncture	
DNF	38	(United Kingdom) Ben Barnicoat (United Kingdom) Rob Bell (United Kingdom) Oliver Wilkinson	(United Kingdom) Jota Sport	McLaren 720S GT3	P	29		
DNF	22	(Australia) Matthew Campbell (New Zealand) Earl Bamber (France) Mathieu Jaminet	(United Arab Emirates) GPX Martini Racing	Porsche 911 GT3 R	PA	26		
DNF	11	(Italy) Giorgio Roda (Germany) Tim Kohmann (Italy) Francesco Zollo	(Switzerland) Kessel Racing	Ferrari 488 GT3 Evo	PA	18	Suspension	
DNF	69	(United Kingdom) Rob Collard (United Kingdom) Sam de Haan (United Kingdom) Callum MacLeod	(United Kingdom) Ram Racing	Mercedes-AMG GT3 Evo	P	8	Crash	
DNF	25	(France) Alexandre Cougnaud (Germany) Christopher Haase (France) Adrien Tambay	(France) Saintéloc Racing	Audi R8 LMS Evo	PA	2	Mechanical	
DNF	70	(United States) Brendan Iribe (United Kingdom) Oliver Millroy	(United Kingdom) Inception Racing	McLaren 720S GT3	PA	1	Mechanical	

== Standings after the event ==
Pro Cup standings

Pos	Pilot	Pts	Gap
1	(Italy) Matteo Cairoli (Germany) Christian Engelhart (Austria) Klaus Bachler	25	
2	(France) Jules Gounon (Spain) Daniel Juncadella (Italy) Raffaele Marciello	18	+7
3	(Italy) Antonio Fuoco (United Kingdom) Callum Ilott (Italy) Davide Rigon	15	+10
4	(Italy) Alessandro Pier Guidi (Denmark) Nicklas Nielsen (France) Côme Ledogar	12	+13
5	(Belgium) Frédéric Vervisch (Germany) Markus Winkelhock (United Kingdom) Finlay Hutchison	10	+15

Silver Cup standings

Pos	Driver	Pts	Gap
1	(Switzerland) Alex Fontana (Switzerland) Rolf Ineichen (Switzerland) Ricardo Feller	25	
2	(Denmark) Benjamin Gøthe (United Kingdom) Stuart Hall (United Kingdom) James Pull	18	+7
3	(United States) Russell Ward (Canada) Mikaël Grenier (United Kingdom) Philip Ellis	15	+10
4	(United Kingdom) Frank Bird (Japan) Ryuichiro Tomita (Denmark) Valdemar Eriksen	12	+13
5	(France) Thomas Drouet (Russia) Konstantin Tereshchenko (France) Simon Gachet	10	+15

Pro-Am Cup standings

Pos	Driver	Pts	Gap
1	(Sweden) Alexander West (United Kingdom) Chris Goodwin (United Kingdom) Jonathan Adam	25	
2	(United Kingdom) Phil Keen (Japan) Hiroshi Hamaguchi	18	+7
3	(Switzerland) Adrian Amstutz (Portugal) Henrique Chaves (Portugal) Miguel Ramos	15	+10
4	(Germany) Nico Bastian (Luxembourg) Olivier Grotz (Germany) Florian Scholze	12	+13
5	(Austria) Dominik Baumann (Germany) Valentin Pierburg	10	+15

- Note: Only the top five positions are included for both sets of standings.

Previous race: 2020 Paul Ricard 1000km	GT World Challenge Europe Endurance Cup; 2021 season	Next race: 2021 Paul Ricard 1000km
