= 2021 GT World Challenge Europe Endurance Cup =

Motorsports event

The 2021 Fanatec GT World Challenge Europe Endurance Cup was the eleventh season of the GT World Challenge Europe Endurance Cup. It saw the series return to a five-event schedule following a shortened 2020 programme.

== Calendar ==
The season began on 16 April at Autodromo Nazionale Monza, and ended on 10 October at Circuit de Barcelona-Catalunya. It lasted five rounds.

Round	Race	Circuit	Date
1	3 Hours of Monza	Autodromo Nazionale Monza, Monza, Italy	16 - 18 April
2	Circuit Paul Ricard 1000 km	Circuit Paul Ricard, Le Castellet, France	28 - 30 May
3	Total 24 Hours of Spa	Circuit de Spa-Francorchamps, Stavelot, Belgium	29 July - 1 August
4	3 Hours of Nürburgring	Nürburgring, Nürburg, Germany	3 - 5 September
5	3 Hours of Barcelona	Circuit de Barcelona-Catalunya, Montmeló, Spain	8 - 10 October

== Entry list ==
Team	Car	No.	Drivers	Class	Rounds
(Germany) GetSpeed Performance	Mercedes-AMG GT3 Evo	2	(Luxembourg) Olivier Grotz	PA	All
(Germany) GetSpeed Performance	Mercedes-AMG GT3 Evo	2	(Germany) Florian Scholze	PA	All
(Germany) GetSpeed Performance	Mercedes-AMG GT3 Evo	2	(Germany) Nico Bastian	PA	1–3
(Germany) GetSpeed Performance	Mercedes-AMG GT3 Evo	2	(France) Jim Pla	PA	3–5
(Germany) Schnabl Engineering	Porsche 911 GT3 R	3	(Denmark) Michael Christensen	P	3
(Germany) Schnabl Engineering	Porsche 911 GT3 R	3	(France) Frédéric Makowiecki	P	3
(Germany) Schnabl Engineering	Porsche 911 GT3 R	3	(Norway) Dennis Olsen	P	3
(Germany) BWT Haupt Racing Team	Mercedes-AMG GT3 Evo	4	(Germany) Maro Engel	P	All
(Germany) BWT Haupt Racing Team	Mercedes-AMG GT3 Evo	4	(Germany) Luca Stolz	P	All
(Germany) BWT Haupt Racing Team	Mercedes-AMG GT3 Evo	4	(France) Vincent Abril	P	1–3
(Germany) BWT Haupt Racing Team	Mercedes-AMG GT3 Evo	4	(Germany) Nico Bastian	P	4–5
(Germany) Haupt Racing Team	Mercedes-AMG GT3 Evo	5	(Germany) Patrick Assenheimer	S	All
(Germany) Haupt Racing Team	Mercedes-AMG GT3 Evo	5	(Germany) Hubert Haupt	S	All
(Germany) Haupt Racing Team	Mercedes-AMG GT3 Evo	5	(Mexico) Ricardo Sanchez	S	1
(Germany) Haupt Racing Team	Mercedes-AMG GT3 Evo	5	(Italy) Gabriele Piana	S	2
(Germany) Haupt Racing Team	Mercedes-AMG GT3 Evo	5	(Italy) Michele Beretta	S	3–4
(Germany) Haupt Racing Team	Mercedes-AMG GT3 Evo	5	(Netherlands) Indy Dontje	S	3, 5
(Germany) Toksport WRT	Mercedes-AMG GT3 Evo	7	(Germany) Marvin Dienst	S	All
(Germany) Toksport WRT	Mercedes-AMG GT3 Evo	7	(Colombia) Óscar Tunjo	S	All
(Germany) Toksport WRT	Mercedes-AMG GT3 Evo	7	(France) Paul Petit	S	1–4
(Germany) Toksport WRT	Mercedes-AMG GT3 Evo	7	(Zimbabwe) Axcil Jefferies	S	3
(Germany) Toksport WRT	Mercedes-AMG GT3 Evo	7	(Turkey) Berkay Besler	S	5
(Belgium) Boutsen Ginion Racing	BMW M6 GT3	10	(Germany) Jens Klingmann	PA	All
(Belgium) Boutsen Ginion Racing	BMW M6 GT3	10	(Germany) Jens Liebhauser	PA	All
(Belgium) Boutsen Ginion Racing	BMW M6 GT3	10	(Saudi Arabia) Karim Ojjeh	PA	All
(Belgium) Boutsen Ginion Racing	BMW M6 GT3	10	(France) Yann Zimmer	PA	3
(Switzerland) Kessel Racing	Ferrari 488 GT3 Evo 2020	11	(Germany) Tim Kohmann	PA	All
(Switzerland) Kessel Racing	Ferrari 488 GT3 Evo 2020	11	(Italy) Giorgio Roda	PA	All
(Switzerland) Kessel Racing	Ferrari 488 GT3 Evo 2020	11	(Italy) Francesco Zollo	PA	All
(Switzerland) Kessel Racing	Ferrari 488 GT3 Evo 2020	11	(Italy) David Fumanelli	PA	3
(Switzerland) Emil Frey Racing	Lamborghini Huracán GT3 Evo	14	(Switzerland) Alex Fontana	S	All
(Switzerland) Emil Frey Racing	Lamborghini Huracán GT3 Evo	14	(Switzerland) Ricardo Feller	S	All
(Switzerland) Emil Frey Racing	Lamborghini Huracán GT3 Evo	14	(Switzerland) Rolf Ineichen	S	All
(Switzerland) Emil Frey Racing	Lamborghini Huracán GT3 Evo	114	(Finland) Konsta Lappalainen	P	All
(Switzerland) Emil Frey Racing	Lamborghini Huracán GT3 Evo	114	(France) Arthur Rougier	P	All
(Switzerland) Emil Frey Racing	Lamborghini Huracán GT3 Evo	114	(United Kingdom) Jack Aitken	P	1–3, 5
(Switzerland) Emil Frey Racing	Lamborghini Huracán GT3 Evo	114	(Italy) Luca Ghiotto	P	4
(Switzerland) Emil Frey Racing	Lamborghini Huracán GT3 Evo	163	(Italy) Giacomo Altoè	P	All
(Switzerland) Emil Frey Racing	Lamborghini Huracán GT3 Evo	163	(Spain) Albert Costa	P	All
(Switzerland) Emil Frey Racing	Lamborghini Huracán GT3 Evo	163	(Austria) Norbert Siedler	P	1–2, 4–5
(Switzerland) Emil Frey Racing	Lamborghini Huracán GT3 Evo	163	(France) Franck Perera	P	3
(Austria) GRT Grasser Racing Team	Lamborghini Huracán GT3 Evo	16	(Italy) Kikko Galbiati	S	All
(Austria) GRT Grasser Racing Team	Lamborghini Huracán GT3 Evo	16	(Austria) Clemens Schmid	S	All
(Austria) GRT Grasser Racing Team	Lamborghini Huracán GT3 Evo	16	(Germany) Tim Zimmermann	S	All
(Austria) GRT Grasser Racing Team	Lamborghini Huracán GT3 Evo	16	(Italy) Alberto Di Folco	S	3
(Hong Kong) KCMG	Porsche 911 GT3 R	18	(Australia) Josh Burdon	P	3
(Hong Kong) KCMG	Porsche 911 GT3 R	18	(Switzerland) Alexandre Imperatori	P	3
(Hong Kong) KCMG	Porsche 911 GT3 R	18	(Italy) Edoardo Liberati	P	3
(Hong Kong) KCMG	Porsche 911 GT3 R	47	(Belgium) Maxime Martin	P	3
(Hong Kong) KCMG	Porsche 911 GT3 R	47	(United Kingdom) Nick Tandy	P	3
(Hong Kong) KCMG	Porsche 911 GT3 R	47	(Belgium) Laurens Vanthoor	P	3
(China) Orange 1 FFF Racing Team	Lamborghini Huracán GT3 Evo	19	(Japan) Hiroshi Hamaguchi	PA	All
(China) Orange 1 FFF Racing Team	Lamborghini Huracán GT3 Evo	19	(United Kingdom) Phil Keen	PA	All
(China) Orange 1 FFF Racing Team	Lamborghini Huracán GT3 Evo	19	(Italy) Stefano Costantini	PA	3–5
(China) Orange 1 FFF Racing Team	Lamborghini Huracán GT3 Evo	19	(Belgium) Bertrand Baguette	PA	3
(China) Orange 1 FFF Racing Team	Lamborghini Huracán GT3 Evo	63	(Italy) Mirko Bortolotti	P	All
(China) Orange 1 FFF Racing Team	Lamborghini Huracán GT3 Evo	63	(Italy) Andrea Caldarelli	P	All
(China) Orange 1 FFF Racing Team	Lamborghini Huracán GT3 Evo	63	(Italy) Marco Mapelli	P	All
(Germany) SPS Automotive Performance	Mercedes-AMG GT3 Evo	20	(Austria) Dominik Baumann	PA	All
(Germany) SPS Automotive Performance	Mercedes-AMG GT3 Evo	20	(Germany) Valentin Pierburg	PA	All
(Germany) SPS Automotive Performance	Mercedes-AMG GT3 Evo	20	(Austria) Martin Konrad	PA	2, 4–5
(Germany) SPS Automotive Performance	Mercedes-AMG GT3 Evo	20	(United States) Colin Braun	PA	3
(Germany) SPS Automotive Performance	Mercedes-AMG GT3 Evo	20	(United States) George Kurtz	PA	3
(Germany) SPS Automotive Performance	Mercedes-AMG GT3 Evo	40	(Switzerland) Miklas Born	S	All
(Germany) SPS Automotive Performance	Mercedes-AMG GT3 Evo	40	(Australia) Jordan Love	S	All
(Germany) SPS Automotive Performance	Mercedes-AMG GT3 Evo	40	(Switzerland) Yannick Mettler	S	All
(Germany) SPS Automotive Performance	Mercedes-AMG GT3 Evo	40	(Germany) Lance David Arnold	S	3
(Germany) Rutronik Racing	Porsche 911 GT3 R	21	(France) Kévin Estre	P	3
(Germany) Rutronik Racing	Porsche 911 GT3 R	21	(Austria) Richard Lietz	P	3
(Germany) Rutronik Racing	Porsche 911 GT3 R	21	(Germany) Sven Müller	P	3
(United Arab Emirates) GPX Martini Racing	Porsche 911 GT3 R	22	(New Zealand) Earl Bamber	P	All
(United Arab Emirates) GPX Martini Racing	Porsche 911 GT3 R	22	(Australia) Matt Campbell	P	All
(United Arab Emirates) GPX Martini Racing	Porsche 911 GT3 R	22	(France) Mathieu Jaminet	P	All
(Germany) Huber Motorsport	Porsche 911 GT3 R	23	(Switzerland) Ivan Jacoma	Am	3
(Germany) Huber Motorsport	Porsche 911 GT3 R	23	(Switzerland) Nicolas Leutwiler	Am	3
(Germany) Huber Motorsport	Porsche 911 GT3 R	23	(Germany) Nico Menzel	Am	3
(Germany) Huber Motorsport	Porsche 911 GT3 R	23	(Germany) Jacob Schell	Am	3
(Germany) Car Collection Motorsport	Audi R8 LMS Evo	24	(Netherlands) Milan Dontje	S	2
(Germany) Car Collection Motorsport	Audi R8 LMS Evo	24	(Germany) Patrick Kolb	S	2
(Germany) Car Collection Motorsport	Audi R8 LMS Evo	24	(Austria) Simon Reicher	S	2
(France) / Audi Sport Team Saintéloc (Note: Car No. 25 entered as Saintéloc Racing from Rounds 1 to 2 and as Audi Sport Team Saintéloc at Round 3, car No. 26 and No. 27 entered as Saintéloc Racing.); (France) / Saintéloc Racing	Audi R8 LMS Evo	25	(France) Alexandre Cougnaud	P	1–2, 4–5
(France) / Audi Sport Team Saintéloc; (France) / Saintéloc Racing	Audi R8 LMS Evo	25	(France) Adrien Tambay	P	1–2, 4–5
(France) / Audi Sport Team Saintéloc; (France) / Saintéloc Racing	Audi R8 LMS Evo	25	(Germany) Christopher Haase	P	3–5
(France) / Audi Sport Team Saintéloc; (France) / Saintéloc Racing	Audi R8 LMS Evo	25	(Switzerland) Patric Niederhauser	P	3
(France) / Audi Sport Team Saintéloc; (France) / Saintéloc Racing	Audi R8 LMS Evo	25	(Germany) Markus Winkelhock	P	3
(France) / Audi Sport Team Saintéloc; (France) / Saintéloc Racing	Audi R8 LMS Evo	26	(United Kingdom) Finlay Hutchison	P	1–4
(France) / Audi Sport Team Saintéloc; (France) / Saintéloc Racing	Audi R8 LMS Evo	26	(Belgium) Frédéric Vervisch	P	1–2, 4
(France) / Audi Sport Team Saintéloc; (France) / Saintéloc Racing	Audi R8 LMS Evo	26	(Germany) Markus Winkelhock	P	1–2, 4
(France) / Audi Sport Team Saintéloc; (France) / Saintéloc Racing	Audi R8 LMS Evo	26	(United Kingdom) Jamie Green	P	3
(France) / Audi Sport Team Saintéloc; (France) / Saintéloc Racing	Audi R8 LMS Evo	26	(France) Adrien Tambay	P	3
(France) / Audi Sport Team Saintéloc; (France) / Saintéloc Racing	Audi R8 LMS Evo II	26	(United Kingdom) Finlay Hutchison	INV	5
(France) / Audi Sport Team Saintéloc; (France) / Saintéloc Racing	Audi R8 LMS Evo II	26	(Denmark) Dennis Lind	INV	5
(France) / Audi Sport Team Saintéloc; (France) / Saintéloc Racing	Audi R8 LMS Evo II	26	(Germany) Markus Winkelhock	INV	5
(France) / Audi Sport Team Saintéloc; (France) / Saintéloc Racing	Audi R8 LMS Evo	27	(France) Alexandre Cougnaud	S	3
(France) / Audi Sport Team Saintéloc; (France) / Saintéloc Racing	Audi R8 LMS Evo	27	(Switzerland) Lucas Légeret	S	3
(France) / Audi Sport Team Saintéloc; (France) / Saintéloc Racing	Audi R8 LMS Evo	27	(France) Aurélien Panis	S	3
(France) / Audi Sport Team Saintéloc; (France) / Saintéloc Racing	Audi R8 LMS Evo	27	(Monaco) Louis Prette	S	3
(United Kingdom) ROFGO Racing with Team WRT	Audi R8 LMS Evo	30	(Germany) Benjamin Goethe	S	All
(United Kingdom) ROFGO Racing with Team WRT	Audi R8 LMS Evo	30	(United Kingdom) James Pull	S	All
(United Kingdom) ROFGO Racing with Team WRT	Audi R8 LMS Evo	30	(United Kingdom) Stuart Hall	S	1–2, 4–5
(United Kingdom) ROFGO Racing with Team WRT	Audi R8 LMS Evo	30	(Argentina) Franco Colapinto	S	3
(Belgium) / Audi Sport Team WRT (Note: Car No. 31 entered as Belgian Audi Club Team WRT, car No. 32 entered as Belgian Audi Club Team WRT from Rounds 1 to 2 and as Audi Sport Team WRT at Round 3, No. 37 entered as Audi Sport Team WRT.); (Belgium) / Belgian Audi Club Team WRT	Audi R8 LMS Evo	31	(United Kingdom) Frank Bird	S	All
(Belgium) / Audi Sport Team WRT; (Belgium) / Belgian Audi Club Team WRT	Audi R8 LMS Evo	31	(Japan) Ryuichiro Tomita	S	All
(Belgium) / Audi Sport Team WRT; (Belgium) / Belgian Audi Club Team WRT	Audi R8 LMS Evo	31	(Denmark) Valdemar Eriksen	S	2–5
(Belgium) / Audi Sport Team WRT; (Belgium) / Belgian Audi Club Team WRT	Audi R8 LMS Evo	32	(Belgium) Dries Vanthoor	P	All
(Belgium) / Audi Sport Team WRT; (Belgium) / Belgian Audi Club Team WRT	Audi R8 LMS Evo	32	(Belgium) Charles Weerts	P	All
(Belgium) / Audi Sport Team WRT; (Belgium) / Belgian Audi Club Team WRT	Audi R8 LMS Evo	32	(South Africa) Kelvin van der Linde	P	1–3
(Belgium) / Audi Sport Team WRT; (Belgium) / Belgian Audi Club Team WRT	Audi R8 LMS Evo	32	(Netherlands) Robin Frijns	P	4–5
(Belgium) / Audi Sport Team WRT; (Belgium) / Belgian Audi Club Team WRT	Audi R8 LMS Evo	37	(Netherlands) Robin Frijns	P	3
(Belgium) / Audi Sport Team WRT; (Belgium) / Belgian Audi Club Team WRT	Audi R8 LMS Evo	37	(Denmark) Dennis Lind	P	3
(Belgium) / Audi Sport Team WRT; (Belgium) / Belgian Audi Club Team WRT	Audi R8 LMS Evo	37	(Switzerland) Nico Müller	P	3
(Germany) Rinaldi Racing	Ferrari 488 GT3 Evo 2020	33	(Chile) Benjamín Hites	S	All
(Germany) Rinaldi Racing	Ferrari 488 GT3 Evo 2020	33	(Finland) Patrick Kujala	S	1–2, 4
(Germany) Rinaldi Racing	Ferrari 488 GT3 Evo 2020	33	(Argentina) Nicolás Varrone	S	2
(Germany) Rinaldi Racing	Ferrari 488 GT3 Evo 2020	33	(South Africa) David Perel	S	3–5
(Germany) Rinaldi Racing	Ferrari 488 GT3 Evo 2020	33	(Italy) Fabrizio Crestani	S	3, 5
(Germany) Rinaldi Racing	Ferrari 488 GT3 Evo 2020	488	(Netherlands) Jeroen Bleekemolen	PA	5
(Germany) Rinaldi Racing	Ferrari 488 GT3 Evo 2020	488	(Germany) Christian Hook	PA	5
(Germany) Rinaldi Racing	Ferrari 488 GT3 Evo 2020	488	(Germany) Manuel Lauck	PA	5
(Germany) Walkenhorst Motorsport	BMW M6 GT3	34	(United Kingdom) David Pittard	P	All
(Germany) Walkenhorst Motorsport	BMW M6 GT3	34	(South Africa) Sheldon van der Linde	P	1–3
(Germany) Walkenhorst Motorsport	BMW M6 GT3	34	(Germany) Marco Wittmann	P	1–3
(Germany) Walkenhorst Motorsport	BMW M6 GT3	34	(United Kingdom) Jake Dennis	P	4–5
(Germany) Walkenhorst Motorsport	BMW M6 GT3	34	(United Kingdom) Nick Yelloly	P	4–5
(Germany) Walkenhorst Motorsport	BMW M6 GT3	35	(France) Thomas Neubauer	P	All
(Germany) Walkenhorst Motorsport	BMW M6 GT3	35	(Germany) Martin Tomczyk	P	All
(Germany) Walkenhorst Motorsport	BMW M6 GT3	35	(Germany) Timo Glock	P	1–3
(Germany) Walkenhorst Motorsport	BMW M6 GT3	35	(Netherlands) Nicky Catsburg	P	4–5
(Germany) Walkenhorst Motorsport	BMW M6 GT3	36	(Germany) Friedrich von Bohlen	Am	3
(Germany) Walkenhorst Motorsport	BMW M6 GT3	36	(Germany) Mario von Bohlen	Am	3
(Germany) Walkenhorst Motorsport	BMW M6 GT3	36	(Germany) Henry Walkenhorst	Am	3
(Germany) Walkenhorst Motorsport	BMW M6 GT3	36	(United States) Don Yount	Am	3
(United Kingdom) Jota Sport	McLaren 720S GT3	38	(United Kingdom) Ben Barnicoat	P	All
(United Kingdom) Jota Sport	McLaren 720S GT3	38	(United Kingdom) Rob Bell	P	All
(United Kingdom) Jota Sport	McLaren 720S GT3	38	(United Kingdom) Oliver Wilkinson	P	All
(Taiwan) HubAuto Racing	Mercedes-AMG GT3 Evo	50	(Germany) Maximilian Buhk	P	3
(Taiwan) HubAuto Racing	Mercedes-AMG GT3 Evo	50	(Netherlands) Nicky Catsburg	P	3
(Taiwan) HubAuto Racing	Mercedes-AMG GT3 Evo	50	(Germany) Maximilian Götz	P	3
(Italy) Iron Lynx	Ferrari 488 GT3 Evo 2020	51	(Italy) Alessandro Pier Guidi	P	All
(Italy) Iron Lynx	Ferrari 488 GT3 Evo 2020	51	(France) Côme Ledogar	P	All
(Italy) Iron Lynx	Ferrari 488 GT3 Evo 2020	51	(Denmark) Nicklas Nielsen	P	All
(Italy) Iron Lynx	Ferrari 488 GT3 Evo 2020	71	(Italy) Antonio Fuoco	P	All
(Italy) Iron Lynx	Ferrari 488 GT3 Evo 2020	71	(United Kingdom) Callum Ilott	P	All
(Italy) Iron Lynx	Ferrari 488 GT3 Evo 2020	71	(Italy) Davide Rigon	P	1–3
(Italy) Iron Lynx	Ferrari 488 GT3 Evo 2020	71	(Italy) Alessio Rovera	P	4–5
(Italy) Iron Lynx	Ferrari 488 GT3 Evo 2020	83	(Belgium) Sarah Bovy	PA	2, 5
(Italy) Iron Lynx	Ferrari 488 GT3 Evo 2020	83	(France) Doriane Pin	PA	2, 5
(Italy) Iron Lynx	Ferrari 488 GT3 Evo 2020	83	(United Kingdom) Katherine Legge	PA	2
(Italy) Iron Lynx	Ferrari 488 GT3 Evo 2020	83	(Denmark) Michelle Gatting	PA	5
(Italy) AF Corse	Ferrari 488 GT3 Evo 2020	52	(Italy) Andrea Bertolini	PA	All
(Italy) AF Corse	Ferrari 488 GT3 Evo 2020	52	(Belgium) Louis Machiels	PA	All
(Italy) AF Corse	Ferrari 488 GT3 Evo 2020	52	(Italy) Lorenzo Bontempelli	PA	1–2
(Italy) AF Corse	Ferrari 488 GT3 Evo 2020	52	(Italy) Alessio Rovera	PA	3
(Italy) AF Corse	Ferrari 488 GT3 Evo 2020	52	(Belgium) John Wartique	PA	3
(Italy) AF Corse	Ferrari 488 GT3 Evo 2020	53	(United Kingdom) Duncan Cameron	PA	2–4
(Italy) AF Corse	Ferrari 488 GT3 Evo 2020	53	(Republic of Ireland) Matt Griffin	PA	2–4
(Italy) AF Corse	Ferrari 488 GT3 Evo 2020	53	(Italy) Rino Mastronardi	PA	3
(Italy) AF Corse	Ferrari 488 GT3 Evo 2020	53	(Spain) Miguel Molina	PA	3
(United Kingdom) Sky - Tempesta Racing	Ferrari 488 GT3 Evo 2020	93	(United Kingdom) Chris Froggatt	PA	All
(United Kingdom) Sky - Tempesta Racing	Ferrari 488 GT3 Evo 2020	93	(Germany) Steffen Görig	PA	1
(United Kingdom) Sky - Tempesta Racing	Ferrari 488 GT3 Evo 2020	93	(Hong Kong) Jonathan Hui	PA	2–5
(United Kingdom) Sky - Tempesta Racing	Ferrari 488 GT3 Evo 2020	93	(Italy) Eddie Cheever III	PA	1–3
(United Kingdom) Sky - Tempesta Racing	Ferrari 488 GT3 Evo 2020	93	(Italy) Matteo Cressoni	PA	3
(United Kingdom) Sky - Tempesta Racing	Ferrari 488 GT3 Evo 2020	93	(Italy) Rino Mastronardi	PA	4–5
(Italy) Dinamic Motorsport	Porsche 911 GT3 R	54	(Austria) Klaus Bachler	P	All
(Italy) Dinamic Motorsport	Porsche 911 GT3 R	54	(Italy) Matteo Cairoli	P	All
(Italy) Dinamic Motorsport	Porsche 911 GT3 R	54	(Germany) Christian Engelhart	P	All
(Italy) Dinamic Motorsport	Porsche 911 GT3 R	56	(France) Romain Dumas	P	All
(Italy) Dinamic Motorsport	Porsche 911 GT3 R	56	(Denmark) Mikkel O. Pedersen	P	All
(Italy) Dinamic Motorsport	Porsche 911 GT3 R	56	(Italy) Andrea Rizzoli	P	All
(United States) Winward Motorsport	Mercedes-AMG GT3 Evo	57	(United States) Russel Ward	S	All
(United States) Winward Motorsport	Mercedes-AMG GT3 Evo	57	(Canada) Mikaël Grenier	S	All
(United States) Winward Motorsport	Mercedes-AMG GT3 Evo	57	(United Kingdom) Philip Ellis	S	1–3
(New Zealand) EBM Giga Racing	Porsche 911 GT3 R	61	(New Zealand) Will Bamber	PA	3
(New Zealand) EBM Giga Racing	Porsche 911 GT3 R	61	(Malaysia) Adrian D'Silva	PA	3
(New Zealand) EBM Giga Racing	Porsche 911 GT3 R	61	(New Zealand) Reid Harker	PA	3
(New Zealand) EBM Giga Racing	Porsche 911 GT3 R	61	(Luxembourg) Carlos Rivas	PA	3
(Germany) / Audi Sport Team Attempto (Note: Car No. 55 entered as Attempto Racing from Rounds 1 to 2 and as Audi Sport Team Attempto at Round 3, Car No. 99 entered as Attempto Racing.); (Germany) / Attempto Racing	Audi R8 LMS Evo	66	(Italy) Mattia Drudi	P	All
(Germany) / Audi Sport Team Attempto; (Germany) / Attempto Racing	Audi R8 LMS Evo	66	(Germany) Christopher Mies	P	All
(Germany) / Audi Sport Team Attempto; (Germany) / Attempto Racing	Audi R8 LMS Evo	66	(Germany) Kim-Luis Schramm	P	1–3
(Germany) / Audi Sport Team Attempto; (Germany) / Attempto Racing	Audi R8 LMS Evo	66	(Austria) Nicolas Schöll	P	4
(Germany) / Audi Sport Team Attempto; (Germany) / Attempto Racing	Audi R8 LMS Evo	66	(Netherlands) Steijn Schothorst	P	5
(Germany) / Audi Sport Team Attempto; (Germany) / Attempto Racing	Audi R8 LMS Evo	99	(Germany) Alex Aka	S	All
(Germany) / Audi Sport Team Attempto; (Germany) / Attempto Racing	Audi R8 LMS Evo	99	(Italy) Tommaso Mosca	S	1
(Germany) / Audi Sport Team Attempto; (Germany) / Attempto Racing	Audi R8 LMS Evo	99	(Austria) Max Hofer	S	2–5
(Germany) / Audi Sport Team Attempto; (Germany) / Attempto Racing	Audi R8 LMS Evo	99	(Germany) Dennis Marschall	S	2–5
(Germany) / Audi Sport Team Attempto; (Germany) / Attempto Racing	Audi R8 LMS Evo	99	(France) Fabien Lavergne	S	3
(United Kingdom) Ram Racing	Mercedes-AMG GT3 Evo	69	(United Kingdom) Rob Collard	PA	All
(United Kingdom) Ram Racing	Mercedes-AMG GT3 Evo	69	(United Kingdom) Sam De Haan	PA	All
(United Kingdom) Ram Racing	Mercedes-AMG GT3 Evo	69	(United Kingdom) Callum MacLeod	PA	1
(United Kingdom) Ram Racing	Mercedes-AMG GT3 Evo	69	(Germany) Fabian Schiller	PA	2–5
(United Kingdom) Ram Racing	Mercedes-AMG GT3 Evo	69	(United Kingdom) Ricky Collard	PA	3
(United Kingdom) Inception Racing with Optimum Motorsport	McLaren 720S GT3	70	(United States) Brendan Iribe	PA	1–3
(United Kingdom) Inception Racing with Optimum Motorsport	McLaren 720S GT3	70	(United Kingdom) Ollie Millroy	PA	1–3
(United Kingdom) Inception Racing with Optimum Motorsport	McLaren 720S GT3	70	(United Kingdom) Nick Moss	PA	2
(United Kingdom) Inception Racing with Optimum Motorsport	McLaren 720S GT3	70	(United States) Kevin Madsen	PA	3
(United Kingdom) Inception Racing with Optimum Motorsport	McLaren 720S GT3	70	(South Africa) Jordan Pepper	PA	3
(United Kingdom) Barwell Motorsport	Lamborghini Huracán GT3 Evo	77	(Portugal) Henrique Chaves	PA	All
(United Kingdom) Barwell Motorsport	Lamborghini Huracán GT3 Evo	77	(Portugal) Miguel Ramos	PA	All
(United Kingdom) Barwell Motorsport	Lamborghini Huracán GT3 Evo	77	(Switzerland) Adrian Amstutz	PA	1, 4–5
(United Kingdom) Barwell Motorsport	Lamborghini Huracán GT3 Evo	77	(Russia) Leo Machitski	PA	2–3
(United Kingdom) Barwell Motorsport	Lamborghini Huracán GT3 Evo	77	(United Kingdom) Sandy Mitchell	PA	3
(Germany) BMW M Motorsport	BMW M4 GT3	82	(Austria) Philipp Eng	INV	5
(Germany) BMW M Motorsport	BMW M4 GT3	82	(Brazil) Augusto Farfus	INV	5
(Germany) BMW M Motorsport	BMW M4 GT3	82	(Finland) Jesse Krohn	INV	5
(France) / Mercedes-AMG Team AKKA ASP (Note: Car No. 88 entered as AKKA ASP Team from Rounds 1 to 2 and as Mercedes-AMG Team AKKA ASP at Round 3, car No. 87 and No. 89 entered as AKKA ASP Team.); (France) / AKKA ASP Team	Mercedes-AMG GT3 Evo	87	(France) Thomas Drouet	S	All
(France) / Mercedes-AMG Team AKKA ASP; (France) / AKKA ASP Team	Mercedes-AMG GT3 Evo	87	(France) Simon Gachet	S	All
(France) / Mercedes-AMG Team AKKA ASP; (France) / AKKA ASP Team	Mercedes-AMG GT3 Evo	87	(Russia) Konstantin Tereshchenko	S	All
(France) / Mercedes-AMG Team AKKA ASP; (France) / AKKA ASP Team	Mercedes-AMG GT3 Evo	87	(Romania) Petru Umbrărescu	S	3
(France) / Mercedes-AMG Team AKKA ASP; (France) / AKKA ASP Team	Mercedes-AMG GT3 Evo	88	(France) Jules Gounon	P	All
(France) / Mercedes-AMG Team AKKA ASP; (France) / AKKA ASP Team	Mercedes-AMG GT3 Evo	88	(Italy) Raffaele Marciello	P	All
(France) / Mercedes-AMG Team AKKA ASP; (France) / AKKA ASP Team	Mercedes-AMG GT3 Evo	88	(Spain) Daniel Juncadella	P	1–3
(France) / Mercedes-AMG Team AKKA ASP; (France) / AKKA ASP Team	Mercedes-AMG GT3 Evo	88	(Brazil) Felipe Fraga	P	4–5
(France) / Mercedes-AMG Team AKKA ASP; (France) / AKKA ASP Team	Mercedes-AMG GT3 Evo	89	(Austria) Lucas Auer	P	3
(France) / Mercedes-AMG Team AKKA ASP; (France) / AKKA ASP Team	Mercedes-AMG GT3 Evo	89	(Russia) Timur Boguslavskiy	P	3
(France) / Mercedes-AMG Team AKKA ASP; (France) / AKKA ASP Team	Mercedes-AMG GT3 Evo	89	(Brazil) Felipe Fraga	P	3
(Spain) Madpanda Motorsport	Mercedes-AMG GT3 Evo	90	(Netherlands) Rik Breukers	S	All
(Spain) Madpanda Motorsport	Mercedes-AMG GT3 Evo	90	(Argentina) Ezequiel Pérez Companc	S	All
(Spain) Madpanda Motorsport	Mercedes-AMG GT3 Evo	90	(Mexico) Ricardo Sanchez	S	2–3
(Spain) Madpanda Motorsport	Mercedes-AMG GT3 Evo	90	(Finland) Patrick Kujala	S	3
(Spain) Madpanda Motorsport	Mercedes-AMG GT3 Evo	90	(Finland) Juuso Puhakka	S	5
(United Kingdom) Garage 59 AMR	Aston Martin Vantage AMR GT3	95	(United Kingdom) Ross Gunn	P	3
(United Kingdom) Garage 59 AMR	Aston Martin Vantage AMR GT3	95	(Denmark) Marco Sørensen	P	3
(United Kingdom) Garage 59 AMR	Aston Martin Vantage AMR GT3	95	(Denmark) Nicki Thiim	P	3
(United Kingdom) Garage 59	Aston Martin Vantage AMR GT3	159	(France) Valentin Hasse-Clot	S	All
(United Kingdom) Garage 59	Aston Martin Vantage AMR GT3	159	(Denmark) Nicolai Kjærgaard	S	All
(United Kingdom) Garage 59	Aston Martin Vantage AMR GT3	159	(United Kingdom) Alex MacDowall	S	All
(United Kingdom) Garage 59	Aston Martin Vantage AMR GT3	188	(United Kingdom) Chris Goodwin	PA	All
(United Kingdom) Garage 59	Aston Martin Vantage AMR GT3	188	(Sweden) Alexander West	PA	All
(United Kingdom) Garage 59	Aston Martin Vantage AMR GT3	188	(United Kingdom) Jonathan Adam	PA	1–2, 5
(United Kingdom) Garage 59	Aston Martin Vantage AMR GT3	188	(Republic of Ireland) Charlie Eastwood	PA	3
(United Kingdom) Garage 59	Aston Martin Vantage AMR GT3	188	(Germany) Marvin Kirchhöfer	PA	3
Oman Racing Team with TF Sport	Aston Martin Vantage AMR GT3	97	(Oman) Ahmad Al Harthy	PA	4–5
Oman Racing Team with TF Sport	Aston Martin Vantage AMR GT3	97	(Italy) Giacomo Petrobelli	PA	4–5
Oman Racing Team with TF Sport	Aston Martin Vantage AMR GT3	97	(Belgium) Maxime Martin	PA	4
Oman Racing Team with TF Sport	Aston Martin Vantage AMR GT3	97	(Republic of Ireland) Charlie Eastwood	PA	5
(France) CMR	Bentley Continental GT3	107	(France) Nelson Panciatici	PA	1–2
(France) CMR	Bentley Continental GT3	107	(France) Gilles Vannelet	PA	1–2
(France) CMR	Bentley Continental GT3	107	(South Africa) Stuart White	PA	1–2
(France) CMR	Bentley Continental GT3	107	(France) Pierre-Alexandre Jean	S	3–5
(France) CMR	Bentley Continental GT3	107	(France) Stephane Tribaudini	S	3–5
(France) CMR	Bentley Continental GT3	107	(South Africa) Stuart White	S	3–5
(France) CMR	Bentley Continental GT3	107	(Belgium) Ulysse de Pauw	S	3
(Poland) JP Motorsport	McLaren 720S GT3	111	(Poland) Karol Basz	P	2
(Poland) JP Motorsport	McLaren 720S GT3	111	(Austria) Christian Klien	P	2
(Poland) JP Motorsport	McLaren 720S GT3	111	(Poland) Patryk Krupiński	P	2
(Switzerland) Hägeli by T2 Racing	Porsche 911 GT3 R	166	(Germany) Marc Basseng	Am	3
(Switzerland) Hägeli by T2 Racing	Porsche 911 GT3 R	166	(Germany) Dennis Busch	Am	3
(Switzerland) Hägeli by T2 Racing	Porsche 911 GT3 R	166	(Switzerland) Pieder Decurtins	Am	3
(Switzerland) Hägeli by T2 Racing	Porsche 911 GT3 R	166	(Germany) Manuel Lauck	Am	3
(Germany) Allied-Racing	Porsche 911 GT3 R	222	(Switzerland) Julien Apotheloz	PA	1–2
(Germany) Allied-Racing	Porsche 911 GT3 R	222	(Germany) Jan Kasperlik	PA	1–2
(Germany) Allied-Racing	Porsche 911 GT3 R	222	(Austria) Nicolas Schöll	PA	1–2
(Germany) Allied-Racing	Porsche 911 GT3 R	222	(Switzerland) Julien Apotheloz	S	3–5
(Germany) Allied-Racing	Porsche 911 GT3 R	222	(Denmark) Bastian Buus	S	3–5
(Germany) Allied-Racing	Porsche 911 GT3 R	222	(Germany) Lars Kern	S	3
(Germany) Allied-Racing	Porsche 911 GT3 R	222	(France) Arno Santamato	S	3
(Germany) Allied-Racing	Porsche 911 GT3 R	222	(Germany) Joel Sturm	S	4–5
(Italy) Vincenzo Sospiri Racing	Lamborghini Huracán GT3 Evo	666	(Netherlands) Glenn van Berlo	S	3
(Italy) Vincenzo Sospiri Racing	Lamborghini Huracán GT3 Evo	666	(Belgium) Baptiste Moulin	S	3
(Italy) Vincenzo Sospiri Racing	Lamborghini Huracán GT3 Evo	666	(Japan) Yuki Nemoto	S	3
(Italy) Vincenzo Sospiri Racing	Lamborghini Huracán GT3 Evo	666	(Estonia) Martin Rump	S	3
(Germany) Precote Herberth Motorsport	Porsche 911 GT3 R	911	(Hong Kong) Antares Au	PA	3
(Germany) Precote Herberth Motorsport	Porsche 911 GT3 R	911	(Germany) Daniel Allemann	PA	3
(Germany) Precote Herberth Motorsport	Porsche 911 GT3 R	911	(Germany) Alfred Renauer	PA	3
(Germany) Precote Herberth Motorsport	Porsche 911 GT3 R	911	(Germany) Robert Renauer	PA	3

Icon	Class
P	Pro Cup
S	Silver Cup
PA	Pro-Am Cup
Am	Am Cup
INV	Invitational

== Race results ==
Bold indicates the overall winner.

Round	Circuit	Pole position	Overall winners	Silver winners	Pro/Am winners	Am winners	INV winners	Report
1	(Italy) Monza	(China) No. 63 Orange 1 FFF Racing Team	**(Italy) No. 54 Dinamic Motorsport**	(Switzerland) No. 14 Emil Frey Racing	(United Kingdom) No. 188 Garage 59	No Entries	No Entries	report
1	(Italy) Monza	(Italy) Mirko Bortolotti (Italy) Andrea Caldarelli (Italy) Marco Mapelli	**(Austria) Klaus Bachler** **(Italy) Matteo Cairoli** **(Germany) Christian Engelhart**	(Switzerland) Alex Fontana (Switzerland) Ricardo Feller (Switzerland) Rolf Ineichen	(United Kingdom) Jonathan Adam (United Kingdom) Chris Goodwin (Sweden) Alexander West	No Entries	No Entries	report
2	(France) Paul Ricard	(China) No. 63 Orange 1 FFF Racing Team	**(United Arab Emirates) No. 22 GPX Martini Racing**	(France) No. 87 AKKA ASP Team	(United Kingdom) No. 93 Sky - Tempesta Racing	No Entries	No Entries	report
2	(France) Paul Ricard	(Italy) Mirko Bortolotti (Italy) Andrea Caldarelli (Italy) Marco Mapelli	**(New Zealand) Earl Bamber** **(Australia) Matt Campbell** **(France) Mathieu Jaminet**	(France) Thomas Drouet (France) Simon Gachet (Russia) Konstantin Tereshchenko	(Italy) Eddie Cheever III (United Kingdom) Chris Froggatt (Hong Kong) Jonathan Hui	No Entries	No Entries	report
3	(Belgium) Spa-Francorchamps	(France) No. 88 Mercedes-AMG Team AKKA ASP	**(Italy) No. 51 Iron Lynx**	(Spain) No. 90 Madpanda Motorsport	(Italy) No. 53 AF Corse	(Switzerland) No. 166 Haegeli by T2 Racing	No Entries	report
3	(Belgium) Spa-Francorchamps	(Italy) Raffaele Marciello (Spain) Daniel Juncadella (France) Jules Gounon	**(France) Côme Ledogar** **(Denmark) Nicklas Nielsen** **(Italy) Alessandro Pier Guidi**	(Netherlands) Rik Breukers (Finland) Patrick Kujala (Argentina) Ezequiel Pérez Companc (Mexico) Ricardo Sanchez	(United Kingdom) Duncan Cameron (Republic of Ireland) Matt Griffin (Italy) Rino Mastronardi (Spain) Miguel Molina	(Germany) Marc Basseng (Germany) Dennis Busch (Switzerland) Pieder Decurtins (Germany) Manuel Lauck	No Entries	report
4	(Germany) Nürburgring	(China) No. 63 Orange 1 FFF Racing Team	**(China) No. 63 Orange 1 FFF Racing Team**	(Switzerland) No. 14 Emil Frey Racing	(China) No. 19 Orange 1 FFF Racing Team	No Entries	No Entries	report
4	(Germany) Nürburgring	(Italy) Mirko Bortolotti (Italy) Andrea Caldarelli (Italy) Marco Mapelli	**(Italy) Mirko Bortolotti** **(Italy) Andrea Caldarelli** **(Italy) Marco Mapelli**	(Switzerland) Alex Fontana (Switzerland) Ricardo Feller (Switzerland) Rolf Ineichen	(Italy) Stefano Costantini (Japan) Hiroshi Hamaguchi (United Kingdom) Phil Keen	No Entries	No Entries	report
5	(Spain) Barcelona	(France) No. 88 AKKA ASP Team	**(France) No. 88 AKKA ASP Team**	(France) No. 87 AKKA ASP Team	(Germany) No. 20 SPS Automotive Performance	No Entries	(France) No. 26 Saintéloc Racing	report
5	(Spain) Barcelona	(Brazil) Felipe Fraga (France) Jules Gounon (Italy) Raffaele Marciello	**(Brazil) Felipe Fraga** **(France) Jules Gounon** **(Italy) Raffaele Marciello**	(France) Thomas Drouet (France) Simon Gachet (Russia) Konstantin Tereshchenko	(Austria) Dominik Baumann (Austria) Martin Konrad (Germany) Valentin Pierburg	No Entries	(United Kingdom) Finlay Hutchison (Denmark) Dennis Lind (Germany) Markus Winkelhock	report

== Championship standings ==
Scoring system

Championship points are awarded for the first ten positions in each race. The pole-sitter also receives one point and entries are required to complete 75% of the winning car's race distance in order to be classified and earn points. Individual drivers are required to participate for a minimum of 25 minutes in order to earn championship points in any race.

Monza & Barcelona points

Position	1st	2nd	3rd	4th	5th	6th	7th	8th	9th	10th	Pole
Points	25	18	15	12	10	8	6	4	2	1	1

Paul Ricard & Nürburgring points

Position	1st	2nd	3rd	4th	5th	6th	7th	8th	9th	10th	Pole
Points	33	24	19	15	12	9	6	4	2	1	1

24 Hours of Spa points

Points are awarded after six hours, after twelve hours and at the finish.

Position	1st	2nd	3rd	4th	5th	6th	7th	8th	9th	10th	Pole
Points after 6hrs/12hrs	12	9	7	6	5	4	3	2	1	0	1
Points at the finish	25	18	15	12	10	8	6	4	2	1	1

=== Drivers' Championship ===
==== Overall ====
Pos.	Drivers	Team	MNZ (Italy)	LEC (France)	SPA (Belgium)			NÜR (Germany)	BAR (Spain)	Points
Pos.	Drivers	Team	MNZ (Italy)	LEC (France)	6hrs	12hrs	24hrs	NÜR (Germany)	BAR (Spain)	Points
1	(Italy) Alessandro Pier Guidi (France) Côme Ledogar (Denmark) Nicklas Nielsen	(Italy) Iron Lynx	5	5	1	1	1	7	7	83
2	(Italy) Raffaele Marciello (France) Jules Gounon	(France) AKKA ASP Team	2	6	8^{P}	4^{P}	Ret^{P}	2	1	79
3	(Belgium) Charles Weerts (Belgium) Dries Vanthoor	(Belgium) Belgian Audi Club Team WRT	Ret	2	5	2	2	6	3	79
4	(Italy) Marco Mapelli (Italy) Andrea Caldarelli (Italy) Mirko Bortolotti	(China) Orange 1 FFF Racing Team	24^{P}	3^{P}	2	10	8	1^{PF}	4^{PF}	73
5	(South Africa) Kelvin van der Linde	(Belgium) Belgian Audi Club Team WRT	Ret	2	5	2	2			56
6	(Austria) Klaus Bachler (Italy) Matteo Cairoli (Germany) Christian Engelhart	(Italy) Dinamic Motorsport	1	7	18	6	Ret	40	2	53
7	(Brazil) Felipe Fraga	(France) AKKA ASP Team			26	14	10	2	1	44
8	(Netherlands) Robin Frijns	(Belgium) Belgian Club Audi Team WRT (Belgium) Audi Sport Team WRT			7	7	4	6	3	41
9	(Spain) Daniel Juncadella	(France) AKKA ASP Team	2	6	8^{P}	4^{P}	Ret^{P}			36
10	(France) Mathieu Jaminet (Australia) Matt Campbell (New Zealand) Earl Bamber	(United Arab Emirates) GPX Martini Racing	Ret	1	10	46	Ret	37	10	35
11	(United Kingdom) Callum Ilott (Italy) Antonio Fuoco (Italy) Davide Rigon	(Italy) Iron Lynx	4^{F}	4	Ret	Ret	Ret	38	39	27
12	(Germany) Luca Stolz (Germany) Maro Engel	(Germany) Mercedes-AMG Team HRT	13	38	16	15	36	3	5	25
12	(Germany) Nico Bastian	(Germany) Mercedes-AMG Team HRT						3	5	25
13	(United Kingdom) Ross Gunn (Denmark) Marco Sørensen (Denmark) Nicki Thiim	(United Kingdom) Garage 59 AMR			15	3	3			22
14	(Switzerland) Alex Fontana (Switzerland) Rolf Ineichen (Switzerland) Ricardo Feller	(Switzerland) Emil Frey Racing	3	13	14	38	31	8	20	19
15	(Denmark) Dennis Lind (Switzerland) Nico Müller	(Belgium) Belgian Club Audi Team WRT			7	7	4			18
16	(Finland) Konsta Lappalainen (France) Arthur Rougier	(Switzerland) Emil Frey Racing	Ret	37	55†	Ret	Ret	5	6	18
17	(Italy) Giacomo Altoè (Spain) Albert Costa	(Switzerland) Emil Frey Racing	23	36	56†	Ret	Ret	4	8	16
17	(Austria) Norbert Siedler	(Switzerland) Emil Frey Racing	23	36				4	8	16
18	(United Kingdom) Ben Barnicoat (United Kingdom) Rob Bell (United Kingdom) Oliver Wilkinson	(United Kingdom) Jota Sport	Ret	16	4	9	7		13	13
19	(Belgium) Maxime Martin (United Kingdom) Nick Tandy (Belgium) Laurens Vanthoor	(Hong Kong) KCMG			24	8	5			12
20	(Germany) Markus Winkelhock	(France) Saintéloc Racing	9	10	17	11	6	17	9	11
21	(Italy) Luca Ghiotto	(Switzerland) Emil Frey Racing						5		10
22	(France) Thomas Neubauer (Germany) Martin Tomczyk	(Germany) Walkenhorst Motorsport	32	9	3	Ret	Ret	15	Ret	9
22	(Germany) Timo Glock	(Germany) Walkenhorst Motorsport	32	9	3	Ret	Ret			9
23	(Germany) Dennis Marschall	(Germany) Attempto Racing	15	18	29	5	9	9	15	9
24	(Denmark) Benjamin Goethe (United Kingdom) James Pull	(United Kingdom) ROFGO Racing with Team WRT	6	19	47	25	22	13	18	8
24	(United Kingdom) Stuart Hall	(United Kingdom) ROFGO Racing with Team WRT	6	19				13	18	8
=	(United Kingdom) Jack Aitken	(Switzerland) Emil Frey Racing	Ret	37	55†	Ret	Ret		6	8
25	(Italy) Mattia Drudi (Germany) Christopher Mies	(Germany) Attempto Racing	12	14^{F}	29	5	9	11	40†	7
26	(Canada) Mikaël Grenier (United States) Russell Ward	(United States) Winward Racing	7	20	21	51†	Ret	24	29	6
26	(United Kingdom) Philip Ellis	(United States) Winward Racing	7	20	21	51†	Ret			6
27	(Denmark) Michael Christensen (France) Frédéric Makowiecki (Norway) Dennis Olsen	(Germany) Schnabl Engineering			6	43†	Ret			4
28	(United Kingdom) David Pittard	(Germany) Walkenhorst Motorsport	26	8	11	Ret	Ret	12	21	4
28	(South Africa) Sheldon van der Linde (Germany) Marco Wittmann	(Germany) Walkenhorst Motorsport	26	8	11	Ret	Ret			4
=	(United Kingdom) Frank Bird (Denmark) Valdemar Eriksen (Japan) Ryuichiro Tomita	(Belgium) Belgian Audi Club Team WRT	8	Ret	37	16	24	16	12	4
29	(United Kingdom) Finlay Hutchison	(France) Saintéloc Racing	9	10	34	Ret	Ret	17	9	3
29	(Belgium) Frédéric Vervisch	(France) Saintéloc Racing	9	10				17		3
30	(Germany) Alex Aka	(Germany) Attempto Racing	15	18	28	23	15	9	15	2
30	(Austria) Max Hofer	(Germany) Attempto Racing		18	28	23	15	9	15	2
31	(Netherlands) Rik Breukers (Argentina) Ezequiel Pérez Companc	(Spain) Madpanda Motorsport	Ret	24	9	13	11	21	23	1
31	(Finland) Patrick Kujala	(Germany) Rinaldi Racing	17	WD				32		1
31	(Finland) Patrick Kujala	(Spain) Madpanda Motorsport			9	13	11			1
31	(Mexico) Ricardo Sanchez	(Germany) Haupt Racing Team	22							1
31	(Mexico) Ricardo Sanchez	(Spain) Madpanda Motorsport		24	9	13	11	21		1
	(France) Thomas Drouet (France) Simon Gachet (Russia) Konstantin Tereshchenko	(France) AKKA ASP Team	11	11						0
	(Germany) Kim-Luis Schramm	(Germany) Attempto Racing	12	14^{F}						0
	(France) Vincent Abril (Germany) Maro Engel (Germany) Luca Stolz	(Germany) BWT Haupt Racing Team	13	38						0
	(United Kingdom) Jonathan Adam (United Kingdom) Chris Goodwin (Sweden) Alexander West	(United Kingdom) Garage 59	14	25			Ret			0
	(Italy) Tommaso Mosca	(Germany) Attempto Racing	15							0
	(Austria) Max Hofer	(Germany) Attempto Racing		18						0
	(Japan) Hiroshi Hamaguchi (United Kingdom) Phil Keen	(China) Orange 1 FFF Racing Team	16	22						0
	(Chile) Benjamín Hites	(Germany) Rinaldi Racing	17	Ret			Ret			0
	(Argentina) Nicolás Varrone	(Germany) Rinaldi Racing		Ret						0
	(Switzerland) Miklas Born (Australia) Jordan Love (Switzerland) Yannick Mettler	(Germany) SPS Automotive Performance	18	Ret						0
	(France) Valentin Hasse-Clot (Denmark) Nicolai Kjærgaard (United Kingdom) Alex MacDowall	(United Kingdom) Garage 59	19	27						0
	(Germany) Marvin Dienst (France) Paul Petit (Colombia) Óscar Tunjo	(Germany) Toksport WRT	20	Ret						0
	(Portugal) Henrique Chaves (Portugal) Miguel Ramos	(United Kingdom) Barwell Motorsport	21	Ret						0
	(Switzerland) Adrian Amstutz	(United Kingdom) Barwell Motorsport	21							0
	(Russia) Leo Machitski	(United Kingdom) Barwell Motorsport		Ret						0
	(Germany) Patrick Assenheimer (Germany) Hubert Haupt	(Germany) Haupt Racing Team	22	23						0
	(Mexico) Ricardo Sanchez	(Germany) Haupt Racing Team (Spain) Madpanda Motorsport	22	24						0
	(Italy) Gabriele Piana	(Germany) Haupt Racing Team		23						0
	(Germany) Nico Bastian (Luxembourg) Olivier Grotz (Germany) Florian Scholze	(Germany) GetSpeed Performance	25	Ret						0
	(Italy) Kikko Galbiati (Austria) Clemens Schmid (Germany) Tim Zimmermann	(Austria) GRT Grasser Racing Team	27	17						0
	(Austria) Dominik Baumann (Germany) Valentin Pierburg	(Germany) SPS Automotive Performance	28	28						0
	(Austria) Martin Konrad	(Germany) SPS Automotive Performance		28						0
	(Italy) Andrea Bertolini (Italy) Lorenzo Bontempelli (Belgium) Louis Machiels	(Italy) AF Corse	29	Ret						0
	(Italy) Eddie Cheever III (United Kingdom) Chris Froggatt	(United Kingdom) Sky - Tempesta Racing	30	21						0
	(Germany) Steffen Görig	(United Kingdom) Sky - Tempesta Racing	30							0
	(Hong Kong) Jonathan Hui	(United Kingdom) Sky - Tempesta Racing		21						0
	(France) Nelson Panciatici (France) Gilles Vannelet (South Africa) Stuart White	(France) CMR	31	Ret						0
	(Germany) Tim Kohmann (Italy) Giorgio Roda (Italy) Francesco Zollo	(Switzerland) Kessel Racing	Ret	32						0
	(Saudi Arabia) Karim Ojjeh (Germany) Jens Liebhauser (Germany) Jens Klingmann	(Belgium) Boutsen Ginion Racing	Ret	31						0
	(United Kingdom) Rob Collard (United Kingdom) Sam De Haan	(United Kingdom) Ram Racing	Ret	26						0
	(United Kingdom) Callum MacLeod	(United Kingdom) Ram Racing	Ret							0
	(Germany) Fabian Schiller	(United Kingdom) Ram Racing		26						0
	(France) Alexandre Cougnaud (Germany) Christopher Haase (France) Adrien Tambay	(France) Saintéloc Racing	Ret	15						0
	(United States) Brendan Iribe (United Kingdom) Ollie Millroy	(United Kingdom) Inception Racing with Optimum Motorsport	Ret	34						0
	(United Kingdom) Nick Moss	(United Kingdom) Inception Racing with Optimum Motorsport		34						0
	(Poland) Patryk Krupiński (Poland) Karol Basz (Austria) Christian Klien	(Poland) JP Motorsport		29						0
	(Belgium) Sarah Bovy (France) Doriane Pin (United Kingdom) Katherine Legge	(Italy) Iron Lynx		30						0
	(Netherlands) Milan Dontje (Germany) Patrick Kolb (Austria) Simon Reicher	(Germany) Car Collection Motorsport		33						0
	(Italy) Rino Mastronardi (United Kingdom) Duncan Cameron (Republic of Ireland) Matt Griffin	(Italy) AF Corse		Ret						0
	(Switzerland) Julien Apotheloz (Germany) Jan Kasperlik (Austria) Nicolas Schöll	(Germany) Allied-Racing	DNS	35						0
Pos.	Drivers	Team	MNZ (Italy)	LEC (France)	6hrs	12hrs	24hrs	NÜR (Germany)	BAR (Spain)	Points
Pos.	Drivers	Team	MNZ (Italy)	LEC (France)	SPA (Belgium)			NÜR (Germany)	BAR (Spain)	Points

Key
Colour	Result
Gold	Race winner
Silver	2nd place
Bronze	3rd place
Green	Points finish
Blue	Non-points finish
Blue	Non-classified finish (NC)
Purple	Did not finish (Ret)
Black	Disqualified (DSQ)
Black	Excluded (EX)
White	Did not start (DNS)
White	Race cancelled (C)
White	Withdrew (WD)
Blank	Did not participate

^{P} – Pole
^{F} – Fastest Lap

==== Silver Cup ====
Pos.	Drivers	Team	MNZ (Italy)	LEC (France)	SPA (Belgium)			NÜR (Germany)	BAR (Spain)	Points
Pos.	Drivers	Team	MNZ (Italy)	LEC (France)	6hrs	12hrs	24hrs	NÜR (Germany)	BAR (Spain)	Points
1	(Switzerland) Alex Fontana (Switzerland) Ricardo Feller (Switzerland) Rolf Ineichen	(Switzerland) Emil Frey Racing	3^{PF}	13	14^{P}	38	31	8	20	91
2	(France) Thomas Drouet (France) Simon Gachet (Russia) Konstantin Tereshchenko	(France) AKKA ASP Team	11	11	40	34	23	Ret	11	74
3	(Germany) Alex Aka	(Germany) Attempto Racing	15	18	28	23	15	9	15	73
4	(Austria) Max Hofer	(Germany) Attempto Racing		18	28	23	15	9	15	65
5	(Denmark) Benjamin Goethe (United Kingdom) James Pull	(United Kingdom) ROFGO Racing with Team WRT	6	19	47	25	22	13	18	61
6	(Germany) Marvin Dienst (Colombia) Óscar Tunjo	(Germany) Toksport WRT	20	Ret	33	21	13	10	14^{P}	58
7	(Netherlands) Rik Breukers (Argentina) Ezequiel Pérez Companc	(Spain) Madpanda Motorsport	Ret	24	9	13	11	21	23	57
8	(Finland) Patrick Kujala	(Germany) Rinaldi Racing	17	WD				32		55
8	(Finland) Patrick Kujala	(Spain) Madpanda Motorsport			9	13	11			55
9	(Mexico) Ricardo Sanchez	(Germany) Haupt Racing Team	22							55
9	(Mexico) Ricardo Sanchez	(Spain) Madpanda Motorsport		24	9	13	11	21		55
10	(Germany) Dennis Marschall	(Germany) Attempto Racing	15	18				9	15	53
11	(United Kingdom) Frank Bird (Denmark) Valdemar Eriksen (Japan) Ryuichiro Tomita	(Belgium) Belgian Audi Club Team WRT	8	Ret	37	16	24	16	12	51
12	(United Kingdom) Stuart Hall	(United Kingdom) ROFGO Racing with Team WRT	6	19				13	18	50
13	(France) Paul Petit	(Germany) Toksport WRT	20	Ret	33	21	13	10		42
14	(France) Valentin Hasse-Clot (Denmark) Nicolai Kjærgaard (United Kingdom) Alex MacDowall	(United Kingdom) Garage 59	19	27^{P}	31	22	14	19	30	32
15	(Canada) Mikaël Grenier (United States) Russell Ward	(United States) Winward Racing	7	20	21	51†	Ret	24	29	32
16	(United Kingdom) Philip Ellis	(United States) Winward Racing	7	20	21	51†	Ret			30
17	(Chile) Benjamín Hites	(Germany) Rinaldi Racing	17	Ret	22	17	30	32	17	28
18	(Switzerland) Miklas Born (Australia) Jordan Love (Switzerland) Yannick Mettler	(Germany) SPS Automotive Performance	18	Ret	36	27	21	18	22	27
	(Italy) Tommaso Mosca	(Germany) Attempto Racing	15							8
	(Germany) Patrick Assenheimer (Germany) Hubert Haupt (Mexico) Ricardo Sanchez	(Germany) Haupt Racing Team	22							0
	(Italy) Kikko Galbiati (Austria) Clemens Schmid (Germany) Tim Zimmermann	(Austria) GRT Grasser Racing Team	27							0
Pos.	Drivers	Team	MNZ (Italy)	LEC (France)	6hrs	12hrs	24hrs	NÜR (Germany)	BAR (Spain)	Points
Pos.	Drivers	Team	MNZ (Italy)	LEC (France)	SPA (Belgium)			NÜR (Germany)	BAR (Spain)	Points

==== Pro/Am Cup ====
Pos.	Drivers	Team	MNZ (Italy)	LEC (France)	SPA (Belgium)			NÜR (Germany)	BAR (Spain)	Points
Pos.	Drivers	Team	MNZ (Italy)	LEC (France)	6hrs	12hrs	24hrs	NÜR (Germany)	BAR (Spain)	Points
1	(United Kingdom) Chris Froggatt	(United Kingdom) Sky - Tempesta Racing	30	21	27	18	19	22^{P}	28^{P}	95
1	(Hong Kong) Jonathan Hui	(United Kingdom) Sky - Tempesta Racing		21	27	18	19	22^{P}	28^{P}	95
2	(Portugal) Henrique Chaves (Portugal) Miguel Ramos	(United Kingdom) Barwell Motorsport	21	Ret	19	24	18	25	26	78
3	(Japan) Hiroshi Hamaguchi (United Kingdom) Phil Keen	(China) Orange 1 FFF Racing Team	16	22	35	50†	Ret	20	35	74
4	(Italy) Eddie Cheever III	(United Kingdom) Sky - Tempesta Racing	30	21	27	18	19			69
5	(Austria) Dominik Baumann (Germany) Valentin Pierburg	(Germany) SPS Automotive Performance	28	28	41	26	25	27	25	69
	(United Kingdom) Jonathan Adam (United Kingdom) Chris Goodwin (Sweden) Alexander West	(United Kingdom) Garage 59	14							
	(Switzerland) Adrian Amstutz	(United Kingdom) Barwell Motorsport	21							
	(Germany) Nico Bastian (Luxembourg) Olivier Grotz (Germany) Florian Scholze	(Germany) GetSpeed Performance	25^{F}							
	(Italy) Andrea Bertolini (Italy) Lorenzo Bontempelli (Belgium) Louis Machiels	(Italy) AF Corse	29							
	(Italy) Eddie Cheever III (Germany) Steffen Görig	(United Kingdom) Sky - Tempesta Racing	30							
	(France) Nelson Panciatici (France) Gilles Vannelet (South Africa) Stuart White	(France) CMR	31							
	(United States) Brendan Iribe (United Kingdom) Ollie Millroy	(United Kingdom) Inception Racing with Optimum Motorsport	Ret^{P}							
	(Germany) Tim Kohmann (Italy) Giorgio Roda (Italy) Francesco Zollo	(Switzerland) Kessel Racing	Ret							0
	(Saudi Arabia) Karim Ojjeh (Germany) Jens Liebhauser (Germany) Jens Klingmann	(Belgium) Boutsen Ginion Racing	Ret							0
	(United Kingdom) Rob Collard (United Kingdom) Sam De Haan (United Kingdom) Callum MacLeod	(United Kingdom) Ram Racing	Ret							0
	(Switzerland) Julien Apotheloz (Germany) Jan Kasperlik (Austria) Nicolas Schöll	(Germany) Allied-Racing	DNS							
Pos.	Drivers	Team	MNZ (Italy)	LEC (France)	6hrs	12hrs	24hrs	NÜR (Germany)	BAR (Spain)	Points
Pos.	Drivers	Team	MNZ (Italy)	LEC (France)	SPA (Belgium)			NÜR (Germany)	BAR (Spain)	Points

=== Team's Championship ===
==== Overall ====
Pos.	Team	Manufacturer	MNZ (Italy)	LEC (France)	SPA (Belgium)			NÜR (Germany)	BAR (Spain)	Points
Pos.	Team	Manufacturer	MNZ (Italy)	LEC (France)	6hrs	12hrs	24hrs	NÜR (Germany)	BAR (Spain)	Points
1	(Belgium) Belgian Audi Club Team WRT (United Kingdom) ROFGO Racing with Team WRT	Audi	6	2	5	2	2	6	3	91
2	(Italy) Iron Lynx	Ferrari	4^{F 1}	4	1	1	1	7	7	90
3	(France) AKKA ASP Team	Mercedes-AMG	2^{2}	6	6	4	10^{P}	2	1	88
4	(China) Orange 1 FFF Racing Team	Lamborghini	24^{P}	3^{P}	2	8	8	1^{P}	4^{P F}	79
5	(Italy) Dinamic Motorsport	Porsche	1	7		6	Ret	36	2	56
6	(United Arab Emirates) GPX Martini Racing	Porsche	Ret	1	8		Ret	37	10	39
7	(Switzerland) Emil Frey Racing	Lamborghini	3^{3}	13	9		31	4	6	38
8	(Germany) BWT Haupt Racing Team (Germany) Haupt Racing Team	Mercedes-AMG	13	23			36	3	5	27
9	(France) Saintéloc Racing	Audi	9	10		9	6	18	9	24
10	(United Kingdom) Garage 59	Aston Martin	14	25		3	3	20	30	23
11	(Germany) Attempto Racing	Audi	12	14		5	9	9	15	22
12	(United Kingdom) Jota Sport	McLaren	Ret	16	4	7	7		13	21
13	(Germany) Walkenhorst Motorsport	BMW	26	8	3		Ret	12	21	15
14	(United States) Winward Racing	Mercedes-AMG	7	20			Ret	24	29	8
15	(Germany) Toksport WRT	Mercedes-AMG	20	Ret			13	10	14	6
16	(Argentina) Madpanda Motorsport	Mercedes-AMG	Ret	24	7		11	17	23	5
	(Germany) Rinaldi Racing	Ferrari	17	Ret			30	32	17	0
	(Austria) GRT Grasser Racing Team	Lamborghini	27	17			Ret	35	38	0
	(Italy) AF Corse	Ferrari	29	Ret			17	30	31	0
	(Germany) SPS Automotive Performance	Mercedes-AMG	18	28			21	19	22	0
	(United Kingdom) Barwell Motorsport	Lamborghini	21	Ret			18	25	26	0
	(United Kingdom) Sky - Tempesta Racing	Ferrari	30	21			19	22	28	0
	(Germany) GetSpeed Performance	Mercedes-AMG	25	Ret			Ret	29	41	0
	(France) CMR	Bentley	31	Ret			Ret	28	32	0
	(Switzerland) Kessel Racing	Ferrari	Ret	32			32	33	36	0
	(Belgium) Boutsen Ginion Racing	BMW	Ret	31			35	42	37	0
	(United Kingdom) Ram Racing	Mercedes-AMG	Ret	26			34	23	Ret	0
	(United Kingdom) Inception Racing with Optimum Motorsport	McLaren	Ret	34			28			0
	(Germany) Allied-Racing	Porsche	DNS	35			27	39	43	0
	Oman Racing Team	Aston Martin						26	27	0
	(Germany) Car Collection Motorsport	Audi		33						0
	(Poland) JP Motorsport	McLaren		29						0
	(Hong Kong) KCMG	Porsche					5			0
	(Germany) Schnabl Engineering	Porsche					Ret			0
	(Germany) Rutronik Racing	Porsche					Ret			0
	(Taiwan) HubAuto Racing	Mercedes-AMG					37			0
	(Italy) Vincenzo Sospiri Racing	Lamborghini					Ret			0
	(Malaysia) EBM Giga Racing	Porsche					20			0
	(Germany) Precote Herberth Motorsport	Porsche					26			0
	(Germany) Huber Motorsport	Porsche					38			0
	(Switzerland) Hägeli by T2 Racing	Porsche					33			0
	(Germany) BMW M Motorsport	BMW							16	
Pos.	Team	Manufacturer	MNZ (Italy)	LEC (France)	6hrs	12hrs	24hrs	NÜR (Germany)	BAR (Spain)	Points
Pos.	Team	Manufacturer	MNZ (Italy)	LEC (France)	SPA (Belgium)			NÜR (Germany)	BAR (Spain)	Points

Key
Colour	Result
Gold	Race winner
Silver	2nd place
Bronze	3rd place
Green	Points finish
Blue	Non-points finish
Blue	Non-classified finish (NC)
Purple	Did not finish (Ret)
Black	Disqualified (DSQ)
Black	Excluded (EX)
White	Did not start (DNS)
White	Race cancelled (C)
White	Withdrew (WD)
Blank	Did not participate

^{P} – Pole
^{F} – Fastest Lap
^{1 2 3} – Fanatec Points Boost

==== Silver Cup ====
Pos.	Team	Manufacturer	MNZ (Italy)	LEC (France)	SPA (Belgium)			NÜR (Germany)	BAR (Spain)	Points
Pos.	Team	Manufacturer	MNZ (Italy)	LEC (France)	6hrs	12hrs	24hrs	NÜR (Germany)	BAR (Spain)	Points
1	(Switzerland) Emil Frey Racing	Lamborghini	3^{PF}							26
2	(United Kingdom) ROFGO Racing with Team WRT (Belgium) Belgian Audi Club Team WRT	Audi	6^{3}							21
3	(United States) Winward Racing	Mercedes-AMG	7							15
4	(France) AKKA ASP Team	Mercedes-AMG	11							12
5	(Germany) Attempto Racing	Audi	15							10
6	(Germany) Rinaldi Racing	Ferrari	17^{1}							9
7	(Germany) SPS Automotive Performance	Mercedes-AMG	18							6
8	(United Kingdom) Garage 59	Aston Martin	19							4
9	(Germany) Toksport WRT	Mercedes-AMG	20							2
10	(Spain) Madpanda Motorsport	Mercedes-AMG	Ret^{2}							2
11	(Germany) Haupt Racing Team	Mercedes-AMG	22							1
	(Austria) GRT Grasser Racing Team	Lamborghini	27							0
Pos.	Team	Manufacturer	MNZ (Italy)	LEC (France)	6hrs	12hrs	24hrs	NÜR (Germany)	BAR (Spain)	Points
Pos.	Team	Manufacturer	MNZ (Italy)	LEC (France)	SPA (Belgium)			NÜR (Germany)	BAR (Spain)	Points

==== Pro/Am Cup ====
Pos.	Team	Manufacturer	MNZ (Italy)	LEC (France)	SPA (Belgium)			NÜR (Germany)	BAR (Spain)	Points
Pos.	Team	Manufacturer	MNZ (Italy)	LEC (France)	6hrs	12hrs	24hrs	NÜR (Germany)	BAR (Spain)	Points
1	(United Kingdom) Sky - Tempesta Racing	Ferrari	30	21	27	18	19	22^{P}	28^{P}	104
2	(United Kingdom) Barwell Motorsport	Lamborghini	21	Ret	19	24	18	25	26	82
3	(China) Orange 1 FFF Racing Team	Lamborghini	16	22	35	50	Ret	20^{F}	35	76
4	(Germany) SPS Automotive Performance	Mercedes-AMG	28	28	41	26	25	27	25^{F}	76
5	(Italy) AF Corse	Ferrari	29	Ret	25^{F}	19^{F}	16^{F}	30	31	63
6	(United Kingdom) Garage 59	Aston Martin	14	25^{P}	23^{P}	47^{P}	Ret^{P}	31	Ret	57
7	(United Kingdom) Ram Racing	Mercedes-AMG	Ret	26^{F}	42	32	34	23	Ret	42
8	(Germany) GetSpeed Performance	Mercedes-AMG	25^{F}	Ret	39	28	Ret	29	38	27
9	Oman Racing Team with TF Sport	Aston Martin						26	27	25
10	(Italy) Iron Lynx	Ferrari		30					33	17
11	(Switzerland) Kessel Racing	Ferrari	Ret	32	52	40	32	33	36	17
12	(Belgium) Boutsen Ginion Racing	BMW	Ret	31	48	33	35	42	37	15
13	(United Kingdom) Inception Racing with Optimum Motorsport	McLaren	Ret^{P}	34	53	42	28			14
14	(Germany) Rinaldi Racing	Ferrari							34	6
15	(France) CMR	Bentley	31							4
16	(Germany) Allied-Racing	Porsche	DNS	35						1
Pos.	Team	Manufacturer	MNZ (Italy)	LEC (France)	6hrs	12hrs	24hrs	NÜR (Germany)	BAR (Spain)	Points
Pos.	Team	Manufacturer	MNZ (Italy)	LEC (France)	SPA (Belgium)			NÜR (Germany)	BAR (Spain)	Points

== See also ==
- 2021 GT World Challenge Europe
- 2021 GT World Challenge Europe Sprint Cup
- 2021 GT World Challenge Asia
- 2021 GT World Challenge America
- 2021 GT World Challenge Australia
