= Tommaso Mosca =

Italian racing driver (born 2000)

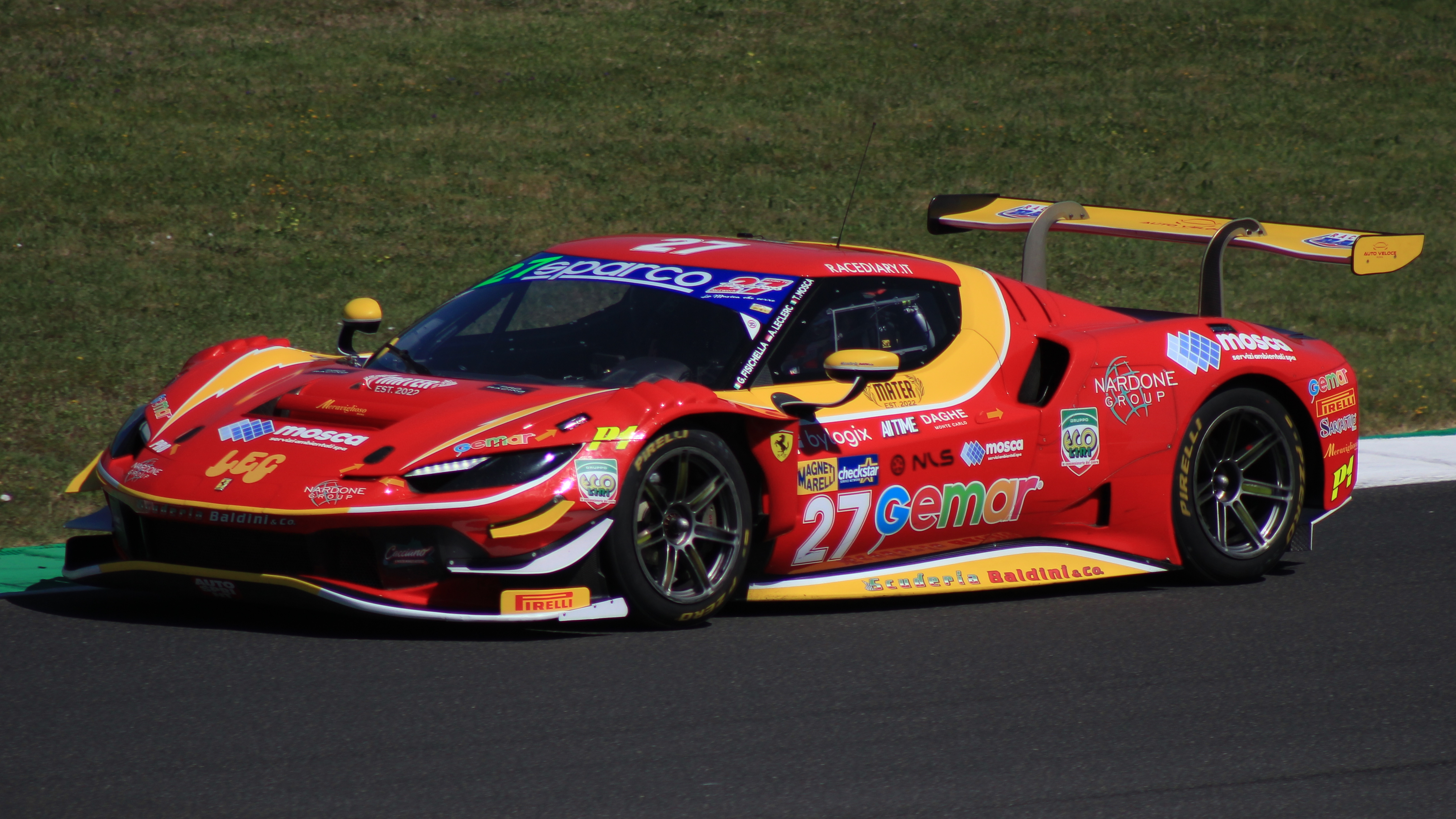
- Mosca in 2024
- Nationality: (Italy) Italian
- Born: 10 April 2000 (age 26) Brescia, Italy
- Categorisation: FIA Silver (until 2024); FIA Gold (2025–)

Championship titles
- 2026 2023–2024: GT World Challenge Europe Sprint Cup – Gold; Italian GT Endurance Championship – GT3

Tommaso Mosca (born 10 April 2000 in Brescia) is an Italian racing driver who last competed in GT World Challenge Europe and the International GT Open for AF Corse. He has been a Ferrari factory driver since 2026.

== Early career ==
Mosca started karting in 2009, mostly competing in Italian-based championships, where he became a race winner in the Italian Karting Championship and also raced as a Maranello Kart factory driver.

Stepping up to car-racing in 2017, Mosca raced in the Audi Sport TT Cup, scoring three podiums and a pole at Zandvoort to finish third in the standings. At the end of 2017, Mosca joined V-Action Racing Team to compete in the final round of that year's TCR Italy Touring Car Championship season at Monza. Despite qualifying sixth in Q1, Mosca finished 16th in the opening race of the weekend and was involved in an accident on the first lap of the second race, leading to an early retirement.

In 2018, Mosca joined Tsunami RT to compete in Porsche Carrera Cup Italy. In his first season in the series, Mosca won at Imola and finished fourth in points. Returning to Porsche Carrera Cup Italy in 2019, Mosca switched to Ombra Racing for his sophomore season. He won again at Imola and ended the season seventh in the standings.

== GT career ==
In 2020, Mosca stepped up to GT3 competition, joining Attempto Racing alongside Mattia Drudi to race in the GT World Challenge Europe Sprint Cup. Scoring a lone podium in the opening round of the season at Misano, Mosca scored points four more times to finish 11th in points. Mosca returned to Attempto Racing for the 2021 GT World Challenge Europe Sprint Cup season, but would only compete in the first two rounds, scoring a best result of sixth in the season-opener at Magny-Cours. In 2022, Mosca joined AKKodis ASP Team to compete in the GT World Challenge Europe Endurance Cup alongside Casper Stevenson and Thomas Drouet. The trio scored a best result of eighth at Le Castellet and finished ninth in the Silver cup standings.

Joining Scuderia Baldini for the 2023 Italian GT Endurance Championship alongside Giancarlo Fisichella, Mosca won at Pergusa and Mugello to clinch the title at the final round of the season at Vallelunga. Returning to Scuderia Baldini for 2024, this time also alongside Arthur Leclerc, Mosca won at Vallelunga and Monza to clinch his second consecutive Endurance title.

Following his second consecutive title in Italian GT, Mosca joined AF Corse to race in the 2025 International GT Open alongside Carl Bennett. In his maiden season in International GT Open, Mosca scored his first win at Le Castellet, and scored further wins at the Red Bull Ring and Barcelona, before ending the year with a win at Monza to secure runner-up honors in the overall standings. During 2025, Mosca also raced in the last three rounds of the GT World Challenge Europe Endurance Cup for the AF Corse in the Bronze Cup. At the end of 2025, Mosca returned to AF Corse to race in the 2025–26 Asian Le Mans Series, scoring a best result of 14th at Abu Dhabi.

Joining the Ferrari factory team for 2026, Mosca returned to AF Corse for a triple campaign in the GT World Challenge Europe Endurance Cup and GT World Challenge Europe Sprint Cups and International GT Open, as well as racing at the 24 Hours of Daytona in GTD. In the Endurance Cup, Mosca finished third overall at the 24 Hours of Spa, whereas in the Sprint Cup, he took class wins at Brands Hatch and Zandvoort to clinch the Gold Cup title. In GT Open, Mosca scored a lone podium at the Hungaroring as he ended the year eighth overall despite missing a round.

== Karting record ==
=== Karting career summary ===
Season	Series	Team	Position
2009	ROK Cup International Final – Mini Rok		3rd
2010	40° Trofeo delle Industrie – 60 Mini	Diego Mosca	9th
2010	Andrea Margutti Trophy – 60 Mini	Diego Mosca	7th
2010	WSK Super Master Series – Mini Kart	AB Motorsport Racing Team	63rd
2010	ROK Cup International Final – Mini Rok		23rd
2011	WSK Super Master Series – 60 Mini	Diego Mosca	??
2011	Andrea Margutti Trophy – 60 Mini	Diego Mosca	33rd
2011	Italian Karting Championship – 60 Mini		22nd
2012	Trofeo di Primavera – KF3		2nd
2013	42° Trofeo delle Industrie – KF3		3rd
2013	18° South Garda Winter Cup – KF3		33rd
2013	Andrea Margutti Trophy – KFJ		24th
2013	WSK Super Master Series – KFJ	Diego Mosca	42nd
2013	Italian Karting Championship – KF3	Diego Mosca	34th
2013	FIA Karting European Championship – KFJ	Diego Mosca	34th
2013	FIA Karting World Championship – KFJ	Diego Mosca	NC
2013	WSK Final Cup – KFJ	Diego Mosca	20th
2013	ROK Cup International Final – Junior Rok		30th
2014	19° South Garda Winter Cup – KF3	SCS Racing	5th
2014	Andrea Margutti Trophy – KFJ	SCS Racing	12th
2014	WSK Champions Cup – KFJ	SCS Racing	9th
2014	WSK Super Master Series – KFJ	SCS Racing	52nd
2014	Italian Karting Championship – KF3		9th
2015	Vega International Winter Trophy – KZ2	SCS	4th
2015	20° South Garda Winter Cup – KZ2	SCS	32nd
2015	Andrea Margutti Trophy – KZ2	Maranello Kart	14th
2015	FIA Karting European Championship – KZ2	Maranello Kart	28th
2015	FIA Karting International Super Cup – KZ2	Maranello Kart	NC
2015	Italian Karting Championship – KZ2		13th
2016	45° Trofeo delle Industrie – KZ2	Maranello Kart	8th
2016	Andrea Margutti Trophy – KZ2	Maranello Kart	25th
2016	German Kart Championship – KZ2	Maranello Kart	56th
2016	FIA Karting European Championship – KZ2	Maranello Kart	13th
2016	FIA Karting International Super Cup – KZ2	Maranello Kart	31st
2016	Italian Karting Championship – KZ2		11th
2017	22° South Garda Winter Cup – KZ2	Maranello Kart	29th

== Racing record ==
=== Racing career summary ===
Season	Series	Team	Races	Wins	Poles	F/Laps	Podiums	Points	Position
2017	Audi Sport TT Cup	N/A	13	0	1	0	3	196	**3rd**
2017	TCR Italy Touring Car Championship	V-Action Racing	1	0	0	0	0	0	35th
2018	Porsche Carrera Cup Italia	Tsunami RT	11	1	0	3	6	107.5	4th
2018	Porsche Carrera Cup France	Tsunami RT	2	0	0	0	0	28	17th
2019	Porsche Carrera Cup Italia	Ombra Racing	7	1	1	2	2	51	7th
2020	GT World Challenge Europe Endurance Cup – Silver	Attempto Racing	1	0	0	0	0	6	27th
2020	GT World Challenge Europe Sprint Cup	Attempto Racing	10	0	0	0	1	25	11th
2021	GT World Challenge Europe Endurance Cup – Silver	Attempto Racing	1	0	0	0	0	8	30th
2021	GT World Challenge Europe Sprint Cup	Attempto Racing	4	0	0	0	0	4.5	28th
2022	GT World Challenge Europe Endurance Cup – Silver	AKKodis ASP Team	5	0	0	1	1	33	9th
2023	Italian GT Endurance Championship – GT3	Scuderia Baldini	4	2	3	1	4	55	**1st**
2024	Italian GT Endurance Championship – GT3	Scuderia Baldini	4	2	3	0	2	79	**1st**
2024	GT World Challenge Europe Endurance Cup – Bronze	AF Corse	1	0	0	1	1	39	7th
2024	Italian GT Sprint Championship – GT3	AF Corse	2	0	0	0	0	12	NC
2025	International GT Open	AF Corse	14	4	1	2	6	136	**2nd**
2025	GT World Challenge Europe Endurance Cup	AF Corse - Francorchamps Motors	3	0	0	0	0	0	NC
2025	GT World Challenge Europe Endurance Cup – Bronze	AF Corse - Francorchamps Motors	3	0	0	0	0	6	35th
2025–26	Asian Le Mans Series – GT	Amerasian Fragrance by AF Racing	6	0	0	0	0	0	34th
2026	IMSA SportsCar Championship – GTD	AF Corse USA	1	0	0	0	0	285	62nd
2026	GT World Challenge Europe Endurance Cup	AF Corse	5	0	1	1	1	16	14th
2026	Intercontinental GT Challenge	AF Corse	1	0	1	0	1	15	22nd
2026	GT World Challenge Europe Sprint Cup	AF Corse	10	0	0	0	0	13	21st
2026	GT World Challenge Europe Sprint Cup – Gold	AF Corse	10	2	0	0	7	106	**1st**
2026	International GT Open	AF Corse	12	0	0	2	1	52	8th
2026	Le Mans Cup – GT3	AF Corse	1	0	0	0	0	0	NC†

=== Complete Porsche Carrera Cup Italy Results ===
(key) (Races in bold indicate pole position) (Races in italics indicate fastest lap)

Year	Entrant	1	2	3	4	5	6	7	8	9	10	11	12	13	14	Pos	Points
2018	Tsunami RT	IMO1; 1; 1	IMO1; 2; 5	LEC; 1; 7	LEC; 2; 3	MNZ; 1; 2	MNZ; 2; 5	MIS; 1; 2	MIS; 2; 6	MUG; 1	MUG; 2	VLL; 1; 15	VLL; 2 WD	IMO2; 1; 2	IMO2; 2; 2	4th	107.5
2019	Ombra Racing	MNZ1; 1 Ret	MNZ1; 2; 5	MIS1; 1; 2	MIS1; 2; 4	IMO; 1; 1	IMO; 2; 5	MUG; 1; 8	MUG; 2 WD	VLL; 1	VLL; 2	MIS2; 1	MIS2; 2	MNZ2; 1	MNZ2; 2	7th	51

=== Complete GT World Challenge Europe results ===
==== GT World Challenge Europe Endurance Cup ====
Year	Team	Car	Class	1	2	3	4	5	6	7	Pos.	Points
2020	Attempto Racing	Audi R8 LMS Evo	Silver	IMO; 28	NÜR	SPA; 6H	SPA; 12H	SPA; 24H	LEC		27th	6
2021	Attempto Racing	Audi R8 LMS Evo	Silver	MNZ; 15	LEC	SPA; 6H	SPA; 12H	SPA; 24H	NÜR	CAT	30th	8
2022	AKKodis ASP Team	Mercedes-AMG GT3 Evo	Silver	IMO; Ret	LEC; 8	SPA; 6H; 54	SPA; 12H; 44	SPA; 24H; Ret	HOC; 16	CAT; 22	9th	33
2024	AF Corse	Ferrari 296 GT3	Bronze	LEC	SPA; 6H; 9	SPA; 12H; 2	SPA; 24H; 13	NÜR	MNZ	JED	7th	39
2025	AF Corse - Francorchamps Motors	Ferrari 296 GT3	Bronze	LEC	MNZ	SPA; 6H; 53	SPA; 12H; 37	SPA; 24H; 33	NÜR; 45	CAT; 40	35th	6
2026	AF Corse	Ferrari 296 GT3 Evo	Pro	LEC; 14	MNZ; Ret	SPA; 6H; 35	SPA; 12H; 23	**SPA**; **24H**; 3	NÜR; 29	ALG; 11	14th	16

==== GT World Challenge Europe Sprint Cup ====
Year	Team	Car	Class	1	2	3	4	5	6	7	8	9	10	Pos.	Points
2020	Attempto Racing	Audi R8 LMS Evo	Pro	MIS; 1; 15	MIS; 2; 6	MIS; 3; 3	MAG; 1; 6	MAG; 2 Ret	ZAN; 1; 8	ZAN; 2 Ret	CAT; 1; 11	CAT; 2 Ret	CAT; 3; 6	11th	25
2021	Attempto Racing	Audi R8 LMS Evo	Pro	MAG; 1; 6	MAG; 2; 12	ZAN; 1; 14	ZAN; 2; 17	MIS; 1	MIS; 2	BRH; 1	BRH; 2	VAL; 1	VAL; 2	28th	4.5
2026	AF Corse	Ferrari 296 GT3 Evo	Gold	BRH; 1; 7	BRH; 2; 19	MIS; 1; 15	MIS; 2; 14	MAG; 1; 10	MAG; 2; 10	ZAN; 1; 7	ZAN; 2; 6	CAT; 1; 30	CAT; 2; 17	1st	106

=== Complete International GT Open results ===
(key) (Races in bold indicate pole position) (Races in italics indicate fastest lap)

Year	Team	Car	Class	1	2	3	4	5	6	7	8	9	10	11	12	13	14	Pos.	Points
2025	AF Corse	Ferrari 296 GT3	Pro	ALG; 1; 7	ALG; 2; 4	SPA; 5	HOC; 1; 7	HOC; 2; 6	HUN; 1; 9	HUN; 2; 2	LEC; 1; 3	**LEC**; **2**; 1	RBR; 1; 1	RBR; 2; 6	CAT; 1; 6	CAT; 2; 1	MNZ; 1	2nd	136
2026	AF Corse	Ferrari 296 GT3 Evo	Pro	ALG; 1; 17	ALG; 2; 5	SPA; 25	MIS; 1; 11	MIS; 2; 4	HUN; 1; 9	HUN; 2; 3	LEC; 1	LEC; 2	HOC; 1; 4	HOC; 2; 14	MNZ; 6	CAT; 1; 9	CAT; 2; 5	8th	52

=== Complete Asian Le Mans Series results ===
(key) (Races in bold indicate pole position) (Races in italics indicate fastest lap)

Year	Team	Class	Car	Engine	1	2	3	4	5	6	Pos.	Points
2025–26	Amerasian Fragrance by AF Racing	GT	Ferrari 296 GT3	Ferrari F163 3.0 L Turbo V6	SEP; 1 Ret	SEP; 2; 17	DUB; 1; 15	DUB; 2; 16	ABU; 1; 14	ABU; 2; 15	34th	0

=== Complete IMSA SportsCar Championship results ===
(key) (Races in bold indicate pole position; results in italics indicate fastest lap)

Year	Team	Class	Make	Engine	1	2	3	4	5	6	7	8	9	10	Rank	Points
2026	AF Corse USA	GTD	Ferrari 296 GT3 Evo	Ferrari F163CE 3.0 L Turbo V6	DAY; 5	SEB	LBH	LGA	WGL	MOS	ELK	VIR	IMS	PET	62nd	285
