= 2021 Paul Ricard 1000km =

(France) 2021 Paul Ricard 1000km
Event Information
- Round 2 of 5 in the 2021 GT World Challenge Europe Endurance Cup
- Date: 28–29 April 2021 GT World Challenge Europe Endurance Cup
- Location: Le Castellet, Provence-Alpes-Côte d'Azur, France
- Venue: Circuit Paul Ricard
- Weather: Fine

Results
Race 1
Distance	182 laps	1050.322 km
Pole position	(Italy) Mirko Bortolotti (Italy) Andrea Caldarelli (Italy) Marco Mapelli; FFF Racing Team	1:53.937
Winner	(New Zealand) Earl Bamber (Australia) Matthew Campbell (France) Mathieu Jaminet; GPX Racing	6:01:51.535

The 2021 GT World Challenge Europe Paul Ricard 1000km was an endurance motor race for the GT World Challenge Europe Endurance Cup, the second race of the 2021 GT World Challenge Europe Endurance Cup, held on 29 May 2021 at the Circuit Paul Ricard in Le Castellet, France.

== Classification ==
=== Qualifying ===
Pos.	#	Drivers	Team	Car	Class	Individual	Combined	Gap
1	63	(Italy) Mirko Bortolotti (Italy) Marco Mapelli (Italy) Andrea Caldarelli	(China) FFF Racing Team	Lamborghini Huracán GT3 Evo	P	1:54.268; 1:53.826; 1:53.719	1:53.937	
2	71	(Italy) Antonio Fuoco (United Kingdom) Callum Ilott (Italy) Davide Rigon	(Italy) Iron Lynx	Ferrari 488 GT3 Evo	P	1:54.336; 1:54.124; 1:53.932	1:54.130	+0.193
3	4	(Germany) Maro Engel (Germany) Luca Stolz (Monaco) Vincent Abril	(Germany) Haupt Racing Team	Mercedes-AMG GT3 Evo	P	1:54.285; 1:54.153; 1:53.969	1:54.135	+0.198
4	88	(Italy) Raffaele Marciello (Spain) Daniel Juncadella (France) Jules Gounon	(France) AKKA ASP	Mercedes-AMG GT3 Evo	P	1:54.103; 1:54.225; 1:54.083	1:54.137	+0.200
5	34	(South Africa) Sheldon van der Linde (Germany) Marco Wittmann (United Kingdom) David Pittard	(Germany) Walkenhorst Motorsport	BMW M6 GT3	P	1:53.872; 1:54.185; 1:54.448	1:54.168	+0.231
6	163	(Italy) Giacomo Altoè (Austria) Norbert Siedler (Spain) Alberto Costa	(Switzerland) Emil Frey Racing	Lamborghini Huracán GT3 Evo	P	1:54.515; 1:54.410; 1:53.831	1:54.252	+0.315
7	114	(Finland) Konsta Lappalainen (United Kingdom) Jack Aitken (France) Arthur Rougier	(Switzerland) Emil Frey Racing	Lamborghini Huracán GT3 Evo	P	1:54.581; 1:54.489; 1:53.755	1:54.275	+0.338
8	54	(Italy) Matteo Cairoli (Austria) Klaus Bachler (Germany) Christian Engelhart	(Italy) Dinamic Motorsport	Porsche 911 GT3 R	P	1:54.233; 1:54.716; 1:54.335	1:54.428	+0.491
9	159	(France) Valentin Hasse-Clot (Denmark) Nicolai Kjærgaard (United Kingdom) Alex MacDowall	(United Kingdom) Garage 59	Aston Martin Vantage AMR GT3	S	1:54.319; 1:54.599; 1:54.609	1:54.509	+0.572
10	22	(Australia) Matthew Campbell (New Zealand) Earl Bamber (France) Mathieu Jaminet	(United Arab Emirates) GPX Martini Racing	Porsche 911 GT3 R	P	1:54.394; 1:54.929; 1:54.226	1:54.516	+0.579
11	51	(Italy) Alessandro Pier Guidi (Denmark) Nicklas Nielsen (France) Côme Ledogar	(Italy) Iron Lynx	Ferrari 488 GT3 Evo	P	1:54.703; 1:54.309; 1:54.592	1:54.534	+0.597
12	26	(Germany) Markus Winkelhock (United Kingdom) Finlay Hutchison (Belgium) Frédéric Vervisch	(France) Saintéloc Racing	Audi R8 LMS Evo	P	1:54.241; 1:55.477; 1:53.949	1:54.555	+0.618
13	35	(Germany) Timo Glock (Germany) Martin Tomczyk (France) Thomas Neubauer	(Germany) Walkenhorst Motorsport	BMW M6 GT3	P	1:54.322; 1:54.790; 1:54.583	1:54.565	+0.628
14	32	(Belgium) Dries Vanthoor (South Africa) Kelvin van der Linde (Belgium) Charles Weerts	(Belgium) Team WRT	Audi R8 LMS Evo	P	1:54.587; 1:54.453; 1:54.722	1:54.587	+0.650
15	25	(France) Adrien Tambay (France) Alexandre Cougnaud (Germany) Christopher Haase	(France) Saintéloc Racing	Audi R8 LMS Evo	P	1:54.575; 1:55.333; 1:53.892	1:54.600	+0.663
16	87	(France) Simon Gachet (France) Thomas Drouet (Russia) Konstantin Tereshchenko	(France) AKKA ASP	Mercedes-AMG GT3 Evo	S	1:54.929; 1:54.576; 1:54.368	1:54.624	+0.687
17	14	(Switzerland) Alex Fontana (Switzerland) Rolf Ineichen (Switzerland) Ricardo Feller	(Switzerland) Emil Frey Racing	Lamborghini Huracán GT3 Evo	S	1:54.720; 1:55.096; 1:54.142	1:54.652	+0.715
18	90	(Argentina) Ezequiel Pérez Companc (Mexico) Ricardo Sánchez (Netherlands) Rik Breukers	(Argentina) MadPanda Motorsport	Mercedes-AMG GT3 Evo	S	1:54.513; 1:55.252; 1:54.279	1:54.681	+0.744
19	38	(United Kingdom) Rob Bell (United Kingdom) Oliver Wilkinson (United Kingdom) Ben Barnicoat	(United Kingdom) Jota Sport	McLaren 720S GT3	P	1:54.839; 1:54.997; 1:54.239	1:54.691	+0.754
20	7	(Colombia) Óscar Tunjo (France) Paul Petit (Germany) Marvin Dienst	(Germany) Toksport	Mercedes-AMG GT3 Evo	S	1:54.872; 1:55.608; 1:53.846	1:54.775	+0.838
21	57	(United States) Russel Ward (Canada) Mikaël Grenier (United Kingdom) Philip Ellis	(United States) Winward Motorsport	Mercedes-AMG GT3 Evo	S	1:55.564; 1:54.584; 1:54.215	1:54.787	+0.850
22	56	(France) Romain Dumas (Italy) Andrea Rizzoli (Denmark) Mikkel Pedersen	(Italy) Dinamic Motorsport	Porsche 911 GT3 R	P	1:54.848; 1:55.032; 1:54.604	1:54.828	+0.891
23	111	(Poland) Patryk Krupińsky (Poland) Karol Basz (Austria) Christian Klien	(Poland) JP Motorsport	McLaren 720S GT3	P	1:55.775; 1:54.728; 1:54.327	1:54.943	+1.006
24	188	(United Kingdom) Chris Goodwin (Sweden) Alexander West (United Kingdom) Jonathan Adam	(United Kingdom) Garage 59	Aston Martin Vantage AMR GT3	PA	1:55.244; 1:55.662; 1:53.931	1:54.945	+1.008
25	30	(United Kingdom) James Pull (United Kingdom) Stuart Hall (Denmark) Benjamin Goethe	(Belgium) Team WRT	Audi R8 LMS Evo	S	1:54.641; 1:55.353; 1:55.211	1:55.068	+1.131
26	31	(Japan) Ryuichiro Tomita (United Kingdom) Frank Bird (Denmark) Valdemar Eriksen	(Belgium) Team WRT	Audi R8 LMS Evo	S	1:54.672; 1:54.873; 1:55.842	1:55.129	+1.192
27	99	(Germany) Dennis Marschall (Germany) Alex Aka (Austria) Max Hofer	(Germany) Attempto Racing	Audi R8 LMS Evo	S	1:55.353; 1:55.200; 1:54.924	1:55.159	+1.222
28	5	(Italy) Gabriele Piana (Germany) Patrick Assenheimer (Germany) Hubert Haupt	(Germany) Haupt Racing Team	Mercedes-AMG GT3 Evo	S	1:55.248; 1:55.345; 1:55.229	1:55.274	+1.337
29	16	(Germany) Tim Zimmermann (Italy) Emilian Galbiati (Austria) Clemens Schmid	(Austria) GRT Grasser Racing Team	Lamborghini Huracán GT3 Evo	S	1:55.715; 1:55.228; 1:55.037	1:55.326	+1.389
30	33	(Finland) Patrick Kujala (Chile) Benjamin Hites (Argentina) Nicolás Varrone	(Germany) Rinaldi Racing	Ferrari 488 GT3 Evo	S	1:55.484; 1:55.380; 1:55.171	1:55.345	+1.408
31	66	(Germany) Christopher Mies (Italy) Mattia Drudi (Germany) Kim-Luis Schramm	(Germany) Attempto Racing	Audi R8 LMS Evo	P	1:55.266; 1:55.293; 1:55.654	1:55.404	+1.467
32	93	(United Kingdom) Chris Froggatt (Hong Kong) Jonathan Hui (Italy) Eddie Cheever III	(United Kingdom) Tempesta Racing	Ferrari 488 GT3 Evo	PA	1:56.154; 1:55.783; 1:54.470	1:55.469	+1.532
33	52	(Switzerland) Lorenzo Bontempelli (Belgium) Louis Machiels (Italy) Andrea Bertolini	(Italy) AF Corse	Ferrari 488 GT3 Evo	PA	1:55.971; 1:55.853; 1:54.649	1:55.491	+1.554
34	40	(Switzerland) Miklas Born (Switzerland) Yannick Mettler (Australia) Jordan Love	(Germany) SPS Automotive Performance	Mercedes-AMG GT3 Evo	S	1:55.731; 1:55.275; 1:55.784	1:55.596	+1.659
35	77	(Portugal) Henrique Chaves (Portugal) Miguel Ramos (Russia) Leo Machitski	(United Kingdom) Barwell Motorsport	Lamborghini Huracán GT3 Evo	PA	1:54.888; 1:55.550; 1:56.463	1:55.633	+1.696
36	107	(France) Gilles Vannelet (South Africa) Stuart White (France) Nelson Panciatici	(France) Classic and Modern Racing	Bentley Continental GT3	S	1:56.487; 1:55.744; 1:54.827	1:55.686	+1.749
37	69	(United Kingdom) Rob Collard (United Kingdom) Sam de Haan (Germany) Fabian Schiller	(United Kingdom) Ram Racing	Mercedes-AMG GT3 Evo	PA	1:56.158; 1:56.049; 1:55.113	1:55.773	+1.836
38	20	(Austria) Martin Konrad (Germany) Valentin Pierburg (Austria) Dominik Baumann	(Germany) SPS Automotive Performance	Mercedes-AMG GT3 Evo	PA	1:56.222; 1:56.299; 1:54.959	1:55.826	+1.889
39	53	(Italy) Rino Mastronardi (United Kingdom) Duncan Cameron (Republic of Ireland) Matt Griffin	(Italy) AF Corse	Ferrari 488 GT3 Evo	PA	1:55.121; 1:57.179; 1:55.247	1:55.849	+1.912
40	19	(United Kingdom) Phil Keen (Japan) Hiroshi Hamaguchi^{1}	(China) FFF Racing Team	Lamborghini Huracán GT3 Evo	PA	1:55.255; 1:56.303; 1:56.000	1:55.852	+1.915
41	2	(Germany) Nico Bastian (Luxembourg) Olivier Grotz (Germany) Florian Scholze	(Germany) GetSpeed Performance	Mercedes-AMG GT3 Evo	PA	1:55.349; 1:55.349; 1:55.788	1:55.908	+1.971
42	70	(United Kingdom) Oliver Millroy (United States) Brendan Iribe (United Kingdom) Nick Moss	(United Kingdom) Inception Racing	McLaren 720S GT3	PA	1:54.941; 1:56.621; 1:56.635	1:56.065	+2.128
43	11	(Germany) Tim Kohmann (Italy) Francesco Zollo (Italy) Giorgio Roda	(Switzerland) Kessel Racing	Ferrari 488 GT3 Evo	PA	1:55.997; 1:56.808; 1:55.474	1:56.093	+2.156
44	222	(Germany) Jan Kasperlik (Switzerland) Julien Apothéloz (Austria) Nicolas Schöll	(Germany) Allied Racing	Porsche 911 GT3 R	PA	1:57.051; 1:56.153; 1:55.424	1:56.209	+2.272
45	10	(Saudi Arabia) Karim Ojjeh (Germany) Jens Liebhauser (Germany) Jens Klingmann	(Belgium) Boutsen Ginion Racing	BMW M6 GT3	PA	1:57.816; 1:57.206; 1:54.943	1:56.655	+2.718
46	83	(Belgium) Sarah Bovy (France) Doriane Pin (United Kingdom) Katherine Legge	(Italy) Iron Lynx	Ferrari 488 GT3 Evo	PA	1:57.656; 1:56.321; 1:56.228	1:56.735	+2.798
47	24	(Netherlands) Milan Dontje (Germany) Patrick Kolb (Austria) Simon Reicher	(Germany) Car Collection Motorsport	Audi R8 LMS Evo	S	1:56.461; 1:56.978; 1:57.252	1:56.897	+2.960
Sources:

- ^1 – Hamaguchi contested Qualifying 2 and 3 for car #19.

=== Race ===
Pos.	#	Drivers	Team	Car	Class	Laps	Time/Gap/Retired	Points
1	22	(Australia) Matthew Campbell (New Zealand) Earl Bamber (France) Mathieu Jaminet	(United Arab Emirates) GPX Martini Racing	Porsche 911 GT3 R	P	182	6:01:51.535	33
2	32	(Belgium) Dries Vanthoor (South Africa) Kelvin van der Linde (Belgium) Charles Weerts	(Belgium) Team WRT	Audi R8 LMS Evo	P	182	+5.971	24
3	63	(Italy) Mirko Bortolotti (Italy) Marco Mapelli (Italy) Andrea Caldarelli	(China) FFF Racing Team	Lamborghini Huracán GT3 Evo	P	182	+6.284	19
4	71	(Italy) Antonio Fuoco (United Kingdom) Callum Ilott (Italy) Davide Rigon	(Italy) Iron Lynx	Ferrari 488 GT3 Evo	P	182	+14.454	15
5	51	(Italy) Alessandro Pier Guidi (Denmark) Nicklas Nielsen (France) Côme Ledogar	(Italy) Iron Lynx	Ferrari 488 GT3 Evo	P	182	+16.540	12
6	88	(Italy) Raffaele Marciello (Spain) Daniel Juncadella (France) Jules Gounon	(France) AKKA ASP	Mercedes-AMG GT3 Evo	P	182	+40.942	9
7	54	(Italy) Matteo Cairoli (Austria) Klaus Bachler (Germany) Christian Engelhart	(Italy) Dinamic Motorsport	Porsche 911 GT3 R	P	182	+47.206	6
8	34	(South Africa) Sheldon van der Linde (Germany) Marco Wittmann (United Kingdom) David Pittard	(Germany) Walkenhorst Motorsport	BMW M6 GT3	P	182	+1:11.874	4
9	35	(Germany) Timo Glock (Germany) Martin Tomczyk (France) Thomas Neubauer	(Germany) Walkenhorst Motorsport	BMW M6 GT3	P	182	+1:23.766	2
10	26	(Germany) Markus Winkelhock (United Kingdom) Finlay Hutchison (Belgium) Frédéric Vervisch	(France) Saintéloc Racing	Audi R8 LMS Evo	P	182	+1:31.922	1
11	87	(France) Simon Gachet (France) Thomas Drouet (Russia) Konstantin Tereshchenko	(France) AKKA ASP	Mercedes-AMG GT3 Evo	S	182	+1:35.288	33
12	56	(France) Romain Dumas (Italy) Andrea Rizzoli (Denmark) Mikkel Pedersen	(Italy) Dinamic Motorsport	Porsche 911 GT3 R	P	181	+1 lap	
13	14	(Switzerland) Alex Fontana (Switzerland) Rolf Ineichen (Switzerland) Ricardo Feller	(Switzerland) Emil Frey Racing	Lamborghini Huracán GT3 Evo	S	181	+1 lap	24
14	66	(Germany) Christopher Mies (Italy) Mattia Drudi (Germany) Kim-Luis Schramm	(Germany) Attempto Racing	Audi R8 LMS Evo	P	181	+1 lap	
15	25	(France) Adrien Tambay (France) Alexandre Cougnaud (Germany) Christopher Haase	(France) Saintéloc Racing	Audi R8 LMS Evo	P	181	+1 lap	
16	38	(United Kingdom) Rob Bell (United Kingdom) Oliver Wilkinson (United Kingdom) Ben Barnicoat	(United Kingdom) Jota Sport	McLaren 720S GT3	P	181	+1 lap	
17	16	(Germany) Tim Zimmermann (Italy) Emilian Galbiati (Austria) Clemens Schmid	(Austria) GRT Grasser Racing Team	Lamborghini Huracán GT3 Evo	S	181	+1 lap	19
18	99	(Germany) Dennis Marschall (Germany) Alex Aka (Austria) Max Hofer	(Germany) Attempto Racing	Audi R8 LMS Evo	S	181	+1 lap	15
19	30	(United Kingdom) James Pull (United Kingdom) Stuart Hall (Denmark) Benjamin Goethe	(Belgium) Team WRT	Audi R8 LMS Evo	S	180	+2 laps	12
20	57	(United States) Russel Ward (Canada) Mikaël Grenier (United Kingdom) Philip Ellis	(United States) Winward Motorsport	Mercedes-AMG GT3 Evo	S	180	+2 laps	9
21	93	(United Kingdom) Chris Froggatt (Hong Kong) Jonathan Hui (Italy) Eddie Cheever III	(United Kingdom) Tempesta Racing	Ferrari 488 GT3 Evo	PA	180	+2 laps	33
22	19	(United Kingdom) Phil Keen (Japan) Hiroshi Hamaguchi	(China) FFF Racing Team	Lamborghini Huracán GT3 Evo	PA	180	+2 laps	24
23	5	(Italy) Gabriele Piana (Germany) Patrick Assenheimer (Germany) Hubert Haupt	(Germany) Haupt Racing Team	Mercedes-AMG GT3 Evo	S	180	+2 laps	6
24	90	(Argentina) Ezequiel Pérez Companc (Mexico) Ricardo Sánchez (Netherlands) Rik Breukers	(Argentina) MadPanda Motorsport	Mercedes-AMG GT3 Evo	S	180	+2 laps	4
25	188	(United Kingdom) Chris Goodwin (Sweden) Alexander West (United Kingdom) Jonathan Adam	(United Kingdom) Garage 59	Aston Martin Vantage AMR GT3	PA	180	+2 laps	19
26	69	(United Kingdom) Rob Collard (United Kingdom) Sam de Haan (Germany) Fabian Schiller	(United Kingdom) Ram Racing	Mercedes-AMG GT3 Evo	PA	179	+3 laps	15
27	159	(France) Valentin Hasse-Clot (Denmark) Nicolai Kjærgaard (United Kingdom) Alex MacDowall	(United Kingdom) Garage 59	Aston Martin Vantage AMR GT3	S	179	+3 laps	2
28	20	(Austria) Martin Konrad (Germany) Valentin Pierburg (Austria) Dominik Baumann	(Germany) SPS Automotive Performance	Mercedes-AMG GT3 Evo	PA	178	+4 laps	12
29	111	(Poland) Patryk Krupińsky (Poland) Karol Basz (Austria) Christian Klien	(Poland) JP Motorsport	McLaren 720S GT3	P	178	+4 laps	
30	83	(Belgium) Sarah Bovy (France) Doriane Pin (United Kingdom) Katherine Legge	(Italy) Iron Lynx	Ferrari 488 GT3 Evo	PA	178	+4 laps	9
31	10	(Saudi Arabia) Karim Ojjeh (Germany) Jens Liebhauser (Germany) Jens Klingmann	(Belgium) Boutsen Ginion Racing	BMW M6 GT3	PA	177	+5 laps	6
32	11	(Germany) Tim Kohmann (Italy) Francesco Zollo (Italy) Giorgio Roda	(Switzerland) Kessel Racing	Ferrari 488 GT3 Evo	PA	177	+5 laps	4
33	24	(Netherlands) Milan Dontje (Germany) Patrick Kolb (Austria) Simon Reicher	(Germany) Car Collection Motorsport	Audi R8 LMS Evo	S	177	+5 laps	1
34	70	(United Kingdom) Oliver Millroy (United States) Brendan Iribe (United Kingdom) Nick Moss	(United Kingdom) Inception Racing	McLaren 720S GT3	PA	174	+8 laps	
35	222	(Germany) Jan Kasperlik (Switzerland) Julien Apothéloz (Austria) Nicolas Schöll	(Germany) Allied Racing	Porsche 911 GT3 R	PA	170	+12 laps	
36	163	(Italy) Giacomo Altoè (Austria) Norbert Siedler (Spain) Alberto Costa	(Switzerland) Emil Frey Racing	Lamborghini Huracán GT3 Evo	P	158	+24 laps	
37	114	(Finland) Konsta Lappalainen (United Kingdom) Jack Aitken (France) Arthur Rougier	(Switzerland) Emil Frey Racing	Lamborghini Huracán GT3 Evo	P	146	+36 laps	
38	4	(Germany) Maro Engel (Germany) Luca Stolz (Monaco) Vincent Abril	(Germany) Haupt Racing Team	Mercedes-AMG GT3 Evo	P	141	+41 laps	
DNF	40	(Switzerland) Miklas Born (Switzerland) Yannick Mettler (Australia) Jordan Love	(Germany) SPS Automotive Performance	Mercedes-AMG GT3 Evo	S	119		
DNF	2	(Germany) Nico Bastian (Luxembourg) Olivier Grotz (Germany) Florian Scholze	(Germany) GetSpeed Performance	Mercedes-AMG GT3 Evo	PA	113		
DNF	7	(Colombia) Óscar Tunjo (France) Paul Petit (Germany) Marvin Dienst	(Germany) Toksport	Mercedes-AMG GT3 Evo	S	93		
DNF	77	(Portugal) Henrique Chaves (Portugal) Miguel Ramos (Russia) Leo Machitski	(United Kingdom) Barwell Motorsport	Lamborghini Huracán GT3 Evo	PA	46		
DNF	53	(Italy) Rino Mastronardi (United Kingdom) Duncan Cameron (Republic of Ireland) Matt Griffin	(Italy) AF Corse	Ferrari 488 GT3 Evo	PA	40		
DNF	107	(France) Gilles Vannelet (South Africa) Stuart White (France) Nelson Panciatici	(France) Classic and Modern Racing	Bentley Continental GT3	S	33		
DNF	52	(Switzerland) Lorenzo Bontempelli (Belgium) Louis Machiels (Italy) Andrea Bertolini	(Italy) AF Corse	Ferrari 488 GT3 Evo	PA	30		
DNF	31	(Japan) Ryuichiro Tomita (United Kingdom) Frank Bird (Denmark) Valdemar Eriksen	(Belgium) Team WRT	Audi R8 LMS Evo	S	15		
DNF	33	(Finland) Patrick Kujala (Chile) Benjamin Hites (Argentina) Nicolás Varrone	(Germany) Rinaldi Racing	Ferrari 488 GT3 Evo	S	1		
Fastest lap: (Germany) Christopher Mies (Attempto Racing) – 1:54.595

== Standings after the event ==
Pro Cup standings

Pos	Pilot	Pts	Gap
1	(New Zealand) Earl Bamber (Australia) Matthew Campbell (France) Mathieu Jaminet	33	
2	(Austria) Klaus Bachler (Italy) Matteo Cairoli (Germany) Christian Engelhart	31	+2
3	(France) Jules Gounon (Spain) Daniel Juncadella (Italy) Raffaele Marciello	27	+6
4	(France) Côme Ledogar (Denmark) Nicklas Nielsen (Italy) Alessandro Pier Guidi	25	+8
5	(South Africa) Kelvin van der Linde (Belgium) Dries Vanthoor (Belgium) Charles Weerts	24	+9
5	(Italy) Antonio Fuoco (United Kingdom) Callum Ilott (Italy) Davide Rigon	24	+9

Silver Cup standings

Pos	Driver	Pts	Gap
1	(Switzerland) Ricardo Feller (Switzerland) Alex Fontana (Switzerland) Rolf Ineichen	39	
2	(France) Thomas Drouet (France) Simon Gachet (Russia) Konstantin Tereshchenko	33	+6
3	(Germany) Alex Aka (Germany) Dennis Marschall	23	+16
4	(Denmark) Benjamin Gøthe (United Kingdom) Stuart Hall (United Kingdom) James Pull	20	+19
5	(Italy) Emilian Galbiati (Austria) Clemens Schmid (Germany) Tim Zimmermann	19	+20

Pro-Am Cup standings

Pos	Driver	Pts	Gap
1	(United Kingdom) Jonathan Adam (United Kingdom) Chris Goodwin (Sweden) Alexander West	45	
2	(Japan) Hiroshi Hamaguchi (United Kingdom) Phil Keen	42	+3
3	(Italy) Eddie Cheever III (United Kingdom) Chris Froggatt	39	+6
4	(Hong Kong) "Jonathan" Hui	33	+12
5	(Austria) Dominik Baumann (Germany) Valentin Pierburg	22	+23

- Note: Only the top five positions are included for both sets of standings.

Previous race: 2021 3 Hours of Monza	GT World Challenge Europe Endurance Cup; 2021 season	Next race: 2021 24 Hours of Spa
