= Ram Racing =

British auto racing team

(United Kingdom) Ram Racing
- Founded: 2012
- Current series: 24H Series, British GT Championship
- Former series: FIA World Endurance Championship, European Le Mans Series
- Noted drivers: (Republic of Ireland) Matt Griffin (Germany) Thomas Jäger (United Kingdom) Tom Onslow-Cole (United Kingdom) Adam Christodoulou (United Kingdom) Lewis Plato (United Kingdom) Alistair MacKinnon
- Teams' Championships: 2013 ELMS GTE; 2015 24H Series
- Drivers' Championships: 2013 ELMS GTE; 2015 24H Series

Ram Racing is a British endurance racing team based in Northamptonshire, England. The team was founded in 2012 by Dan Shufflebottom, whose motorsport background includes working as lead mechanic for Michael Schumacher during his time with Mercedes. Funding for the venture was provided by an anonymous backer located in the Middle East, later revealed to be Cheerag Arya, and the team is located in a 1,200 square meter facility on the edge of Silverstone Circuit.

== History ==
=== 2013 ===
Ram's debut was in the 2013 European Le Mans Series, with two Ferrari 458 Italias fielded in the GTE class. The No. 52 car took victory at Imola, the Red Bull Ring, Circuit Paul Ricard, and second place at Silverstone and the Hungaroring. At the end of the season, the No. 52 and No. 53 cars had earned 114 and 63 points respectively.

=== 2014 ===
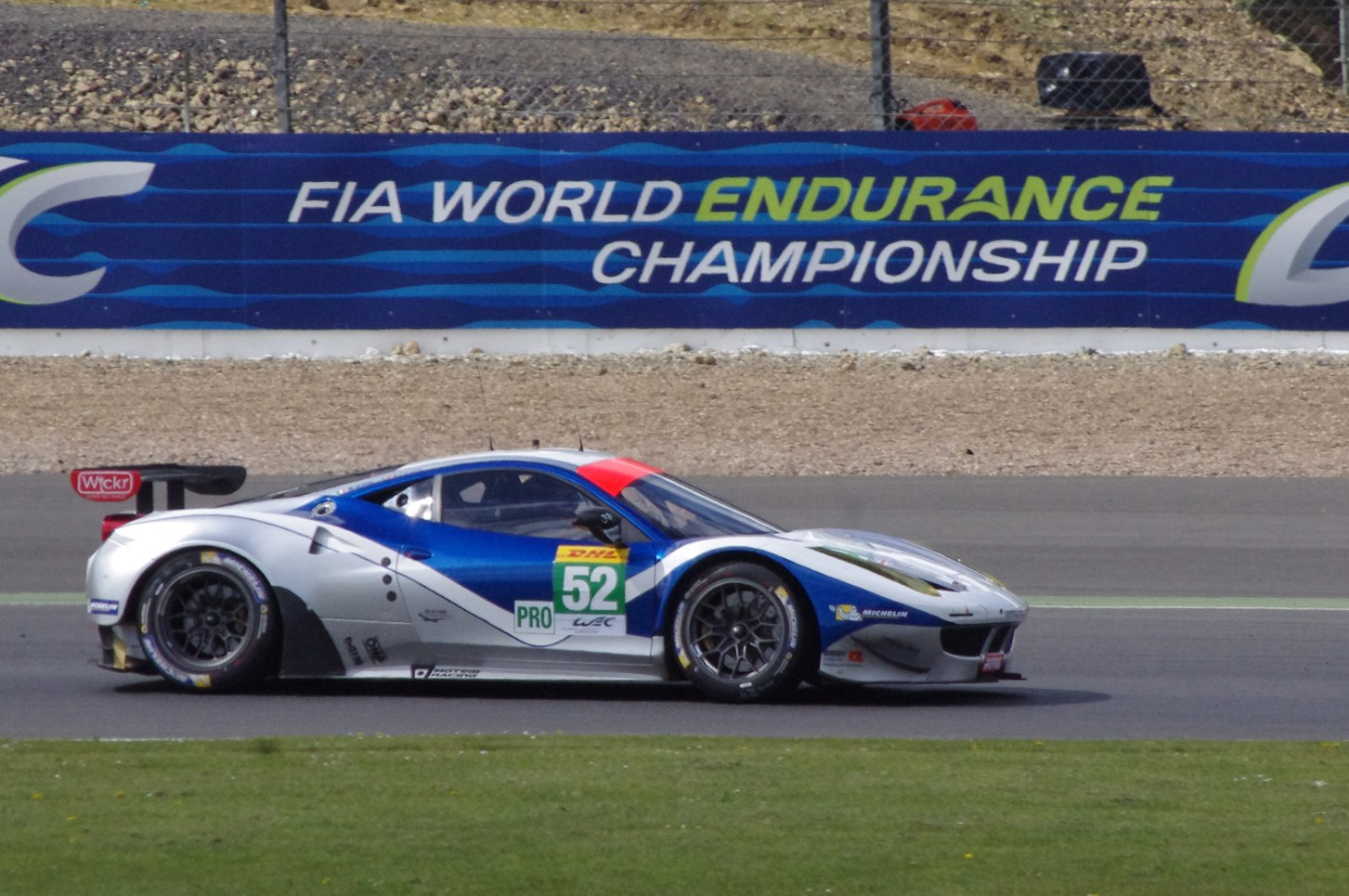
The No. 52 Ferrari 458 Italia GT2 at Silverstone

2014 opened with an 11th-place finish by a Ferrari 458 Italia GT3 at the Dubai 24 Hour. Ram Racing's effort in the 2014 FIA World Endurance Championship season was brief, with their Ferrari 458 Italia GT2s starting only at the 6 Hours of Silverstone and 24 Hours of Le Mans. The No. 52 car earned 8 points with one sixth-place finish and a retirement, and the No. 53 car earned 26 points with fifth and sixth-place finishes. The team announced an official withdrawal from the championship on 11 June, with only a skeleton crew remaining in employment. A six-month hiatus from racing was ended by an announcement in late December that a Mercedes-Benz SLS AMG GT3 would be fielded at the 2015 24H Dubai. The goal of the switch to Mercedes-Benz was to reduce cost and gain a foothold for budgeting. On 9 December, the FIA granted the six-round 24H Series championship status.

=== 2015 ===
Ram Racing began the 2015 season with an announcement of a full foray into the 24H Series, continuing to field the Mercedes-Benz SLS AMG GT3. The opening race in Dubai resulted in a second-place finish 4 laps behind the Black Falcon Mercedes-Benz. This ended a six-month drought started by the team's financial trouble during the 2014 WEC. On 11 March, the team entered the 2015 British GT Championship with the Mercedes-Benz SLS AMG GT3, driven by Lewis Plato and Alistair MacKinnon. During round 2 of the 24H Series, the No. 30 car finished in second place at 12H Italy-Mugello after delays in the pits and multiple Code 60 periods.

== Racing record ==
=== 24 Hours of Le Mans ===
Year	Entrant	No.	Car	Drivers	Class	Laps	Pos.	Class Pos.
2014	(United Kingdom) Ram Racing	52	Ferrari 458 Italia GT2	(Republic of Ireland) Matt Griffin (Italy) Federico Leo (Portugal) Álvaro Parente	LMGTE Pro	140	DNF	DNF
2014	(United Kingdom) Ram Racing	53	Ferrari 458 Italia GT2	(United Kingdom) Archie Hamilton (United Kingdom) Johnny Mowlem (United States) Mark Patterson	LMGTE Am	319	32nd	12th
