= Jordan Love (racing driver) =

Australian racing driver (born 1999)

- Nationality: Australian
- Born: Jordan David Love; 27 April 1999 (age 27) Perth, Western Australia
- Relatives: Aaron Love (brother)

GT World Challenge Europe Endurance Cup
- Categorisation: FIA Silver (until 2025); FIA Gold (2026–)
- Years active: 2021–2023
- Teams: SPS Automotive Performance; Haupt Racing Team
- Starts: 8
- Wins: 0
- Poles: 0
- Fastest laps: 0
- Best finish: NC in 2021, 2022

Previous series
- 2015–2016 2016 2016–17 2017 2017–2019 2018 2020 2021, 2023 2022 2023: Australian Formula 4 Championship; ADAC Formula 4 Formula 4 South East Asia Championship; Porsche GT3 Cup Challenge Australia; Porsche Carrera Cup Australia; Porsche Carrera Cup France; Porsche Supercup; GT World Challenge Europe Sprint Cup; International GT Open; Intercontinental GT Challenge

Championship titles
- 2017 2019: Porsche GT3 Cup Challenge Australia; Porsche Carrera Cup Australia

Jordan David Love (born 27 April 1999) is a racing driver from Australia. He currently competes in a variety of Group GT3 championships for Mercedes-AMG.

== Results ==
=== Career summary ===
Year	Series	Team	Races	Wins	Poles	F/Laps	Podiums	Points	Position
2015	Australian Formula 4 Championship	AGI Sport	12	0	0	0	1	62	11th
2015	CAMS WA AUS F1000 State Championship		6	3	1	4	6	135	**3rd**
2015	Western Australian Formula Ford Championship		3	0	0	0	0	0	NC
2016	ADAC Formula 4 Championship	SMC Schwärzler Motorsport Concepts	3	0	0	0	0	0	42nd
2016	Australian Formula 4 Championship	Team BRM	18	4	2	4	10	246	**3rd**
2016	CAMS WA AUS F1000 State Championship		6	4	2	2	6	140	9th
2016	Cue Sports Car Enduro Interclub Championship		2	0	0	0	0	0	NC†
2016–17	Formula 4 South East Asia Championship	Meritus.GP	12	8	4	10	10	296	6th
2017	Porsche GT3 Cup Challenge Australia	Sonic Motor Racing Services	18	15	4	17	16	496	**1st**
2017	Porsche Carrera Cup Australia	Sonic Motor Racing Services	9	0	0	0	0	187	12th
2017	Cue Sports Car Enduro Interclub Championship		2	0	0	0	2	0	NC†
2018	Porsche Carrera Cup Australia	Sonic Motor Racing Services	23	2	0	1	6	833	4th
2018	Porsche Carrera Cup France	Martinet by Alméras	2	0	0	0	0	0	NC†
2019	Porsche Carrera Cup Australia	Sonic Motor Racing Services	24	11	2	7	16	1047	**1st**
2020	Porsche Supercup	Fach Auto Tech	8	0	0	0	0	44	10th
2021	GT World Challenge Europe Endurance Cup	SPS Automotive Performance	5	0	0	0	0	0	NC
2021	GT World Challenge Europe Sprint Cup	SPS Automotive Performance	2	0	0	0	0	0	NC
2022	GT World Challenge Europe Endurance Cup	Haupt Racing Team	5	0	0	0	0	0	NC
2022	International GT Open	Haupt Racing Team	1	0	0	0	1	24	14th
2022	GT World Challenge Australia	Harrolds Racing							
2023	Intercontinental GT Challenge	Makita Volante Rosso Motorsport	1	0	0	0	0	6	27th
2023	GT World Challenge Europe Sprint Cup	Haupt Racing Team	10	0	0	0	0	9	15th
2023	GT World Challenge Europe Endurance Cup	Haupt Racing Team	1	0	0	0	0	0	NC
2023	GT World Challenge Australia - Pro-Am	Tony Bates Racing	2	0	0	0	0	14	17th
2023	GT World Challenge Australia - Pro-Am	Volante Rosso Motorsport						14	17th
2023	24 Hours of Nürburgring - SP9	Mercedes-AMG Team Bilstein by HRT	1	0	0	0	0	N/A	8th
2023–24	Asian Le Mans Series - GT	Triple Eight JMR	3	2	0	0	2	60	**3rd**
2023–24	Middle East Trophy - GT3 Pro-Am	EBM – Grove Racing	1	0	0	0	0	28	5th
2024	GT World Challenge Europe Endurance Cup	Triple Eight JMR	1	0	0	0	0	0	NC
2024	Intercontinental GT Challenge	Triple Eight JMR	1	0	0	0	0	0	NC
2024	GT World Challenge Asia	Triple Eight JMR	2	0	0	?	0	13	33rd
2024	International GT Open - Pro-Am	Triple Eight JMR	1	0	0	0	0	0	41st
2024	GT World Challenge America - Pro-Am	Triple Eight JMR	1	0	0	0	0	8	19th
2024	IMSA SportsCar Championship - GTD Pro	SunEnergy1 Racing	1	0	0	0	0	263	39th
2025	GT World Challenge Australia - Pro-Am	Arise Racing GT	10	0	0	0	0	58	10th
2025	GT World Challenge Asia Pro-Am	Johor Motorsports Racing JMR	8	0	0	0	1	39	18th
2025	GT World Challenge Europe Endurance Cup	Johor Motorsports JMR	1	0	0	0	0	0	NC
2025–26	Asian Le Mans Series - GT	Johor Motorsports JMR	4	0	0	1	0	2	26th
2026	GT World Challenge Australia - Pro-Am	ARGT							
2026	GT World Challenge Europe Endurance Cup	Johor Motorsports Racing JMR	1	0	0	0	0	0	NC
2026	Intercontinental GT Challenge	Johor Motorsports Racing JMR	2	0	0	0	0	0	NC

*Season in progress.

† As he was a guest driver, Love was ineligible to score points.

=== Complete Australian Formula 4 Championship results ===
(key) (Races in bold indicate pole position) (Races in italics indicate fastest lap)

Year	Team	1	2	3	4	5	6	7	8	9	10	11	12	13	14	15	16	17	18	19	20	21	DC	Points
2015	AGI Sport	TOW; 1 Ret	TOW; 2; 7	TOW; 3; 7	QLD; 1; 8	QLD; 2; 9	QLD; 3; 9	SMP; 1; 9	SMP; 2; 10	SMP; 3; 6	SAN; 1; 4	SAN; 2; 3	SAN; 3; 8	SUR; 1	SUR; 2	SUR; 3	PHI; 1	PHI; 2	PHI; 3	SYD; 1	SYD; 2	SYD; 3	11th	62
2016	Team BRM	SYM; 1 Ret	SYM; 2; 1	SYM; 3; 1	PHI; 1; 1	PHI; 2; 2	PHI; 3; 1	SMP; 1; 10	SMP; 2; 7	SMP; 3 Ret	QLD; 1; 3	QLD; 2; 2	QLD; 3; 4	**SAN**; **1**; 2	SAN; 2; 3	**SAN**; **3**; 3	SUR; 1; 5	SUR; 2; 6	SUR; 3; 5				3rd	246

=== Complete ADAC Formula 4 Championship results ===
(key) (Races in bold indicate pole position) (Races in italics indicate fastest lap)

Year	Team	1	2	3	4	5	6	7	8	9	10	11	12	13	14	15	16	17	18	19	20	21	22	23	24	DC	Points
2016	SMC Schwärzler Motorsport Concepts	OSC1; 1	OSC1; 2	OSC1; 3	SAC; 1	SAC; 2	SAC; 3	LAU; 1	LAU; 2	LAU; 3	OSC2; 1	OSC2; 2	OSC2; 3	RBR; 1	RBR; 2	RBR; 3	NÜR; 1	NÜR; 2	NÜR; 3	ZAN; 1	ZAN; 2	ZAN; 3	HOC; 1 Ret	HOC; 2; 18	HOC; 3; 23	42nd	0

=== Complete Formula 4 South East Asia Championship results ===
(key) (Races in bold indicate pole position) (Races in italics indicate fastest lap)

Year	1	2	3	4	5	6	7	8	9	10	11	12	13	14	15	16	17	18	19	20	21	22	23	24	25	26	27	28	29	30	31	32	33	34	35	36	DC	Points
2016-17	**SEP1**; **1**; 1	SEP1; 2; 1	SEP1; 3 Ret	**SEP1**; **4**; 1	SEP1; 5; 7	SEP1; 6; 2	CLA; 1	CLA; 2	CLA; 3	CLA; 4	CLA; 5	SEN; 1	SEN; 2	SEN; 3	SEN; 4	SEN; 5	SEN; 6	**SEP2**; **1**; 1	SEP2; 2; 1	SEP2; 3; 1	**SEP2**; **4**; 1	SEP2; 5; 1	SEP2; 6; 2	CHA; 1	CHA; 2	CHA; 3	CHA; 4	CHA; 5	CHA; 6	CHA; 7	SEP3; 1	SEP3; 2	SEP3; 3	SEP3; 4	SEP3; 5	SEP3; 6	6th	296

=== Complete Bathurst 12 Hour results ===
Year	Team	Co-drivers	Car	Class	Laps	Pos.	Class Pos.
2018	MARC Cars Australia	(Australia) John Goodacre (Australia) Peter Major	MARC Focus V8	I	—N/a	DNS	
2023	(Australia) Volante Rosso Motorsport	(Australia) Tony Bates (Australia) David Reynolds	Mercedes-AMG GT3 Evo	GT3; Pro-Am	316	11th	4th
2024	(Australia) Triple Eight Race Engineering	(Malaysia) Prince Jeffri Ibrahim (Australia) Jamie Whincup	Mercedes-AMG GT3 Evo	GT3; Pro-Am	274	11th	**3rd**
2026	(Malaysia) Johor Motorsports Racing JMR	(United Kingdom) Ben Green (Malaysia) Prince Abu Bakar Ibrahim (Malaysia) Prince Jeffri Ibrahim	Chevrolet Corvette Z06 GT3.R	GT3; Pro-Am	261	14th	**2nd**

=== Porsche Supercup results ===
Year	Team	Car	1	2	3	4	5	6	7	8	Pos.	Points
2020	Fach Auto Tech	Porsche 911 GT3 Cup (991.2)	SPI1; 12	SPI2; 13	BUD; 8	SIL1; 12	SIL2; Ret	BCN; 11	SPA; 12	MNZ; 7	10th	44

=== Complete GT World Challenge Europe results ===
==== GT World Challenge Europe Endurance Cup ====
Year	Team	Car	Class	1	2	3	4	5	6	7	Pos.	Points
2021	SPS Automotive Performance	Mercedes-AMG GT3 Evo	Silver	MNZ; 18	LEC; Ret	SPA; 6H; 36	SPA; 12H; 27	SPA; 24H; 21	NÜR; 19	CAT; 22	18th	27
2022	Haupt Racing Team	Mercedes-AMG GT3 Evo	Silver	IMO; 37	LEC; 16	SPA; 6H; 20	SPA; 12H; 12	SPA; 24H; Ret	HOC; Ret	CAT; 25	10th	31
2023	Haupt Racing Team	Mercedes-AMG GT3 Evo	Bronze	MNZ	LEC	SPA; 6H; 36	SPA; 12H; 34	SPA; 24H; 24	NÜR	CAT	21st	14
2024	Triple Eight JMR	Mercedes-AMG GT3 Evo	Pro-Am	LEC	SPA; 6H; 52†	SPA; 12H; Ret	SPA; 24H; Ret	NÜR	MNZ	JED	NC	0
2025	Johor Motorsports JMR	Chevrolet Corvette Z06 GT3.R	Bronze	LEC	MNZ	SPA; 6H; 61	SPA; 12H; 51	SPA; 24H; 43	NÜR	CAT	NC	0
2026	Johor Motorsports Racing JMR	Chevrolet Corvette Z06 GT3.R	Pro-Am	LEC	MNZ	SPA; 6H; 51	SPA; 12H; 38	SPA; 24H; 29	NÜR	ALG	NC	0

==== GT World Challenge Europe Sprint Cup ====
Year	Team	Car	Class	1	2	3	4	5	6	7	8	9	10	Pos.	Points
2021	SPS Automotive Performance	Mercedes-AMG GT3 Evo	Silver	MAG; 1	MAG; 2	ZAN; 1	ZAN; 2	MIS; 1; 16	MIS; 2; 21	BRH; 1	BRH; 2	VAL; 1	VAL; 2	18th	5
2023	Haupt Racing Team	Mercedes-AMG GT3 Evo	Silver	BRH; 1; 20	BRH; 2; 16	**MIS**; **1**; 12	MIS; 2; 16	**HOC**; **1**; 12	HOC; 2; 14	**VAL**; **1**; 11	VAL; 2; 13	ZAN; 1; 6	**ZAN**; **2**; 6	1st	135

=== Complete 24 Hours of Nürburgring results ===
Year	Team	Co-Drivers	Car	Class	Laps	Ovr. Pos.	Class Pos.
2023	(Germany) Haupt Racing Team	(Germany) Hubert Haupt (India) Arjun Maini	Mercedes-AMG GT3 Evo	SP9; Pro-Am	161	8th	**2nd**

=== Complete IMSA SportsCar Championship results ===
(key) (Races in bold indicate pole position; races in italics indicate fastest lap)

Year	Team	Make	Engine	Class	1	2	3	4	5	6	7	8	9	10	Pos.	Points
2024	SunEnergy1 Racing	Mercedes-AMG GT3 Evo	Mercedes-AMG M159 6.2 L V8	GTD Pro	DAY	SEB	LGA	DET	WGL	MOS	ELK	VIR	IMS; 7	PET	39th	263
