= David Perel =

South African racing driver (born 1985)

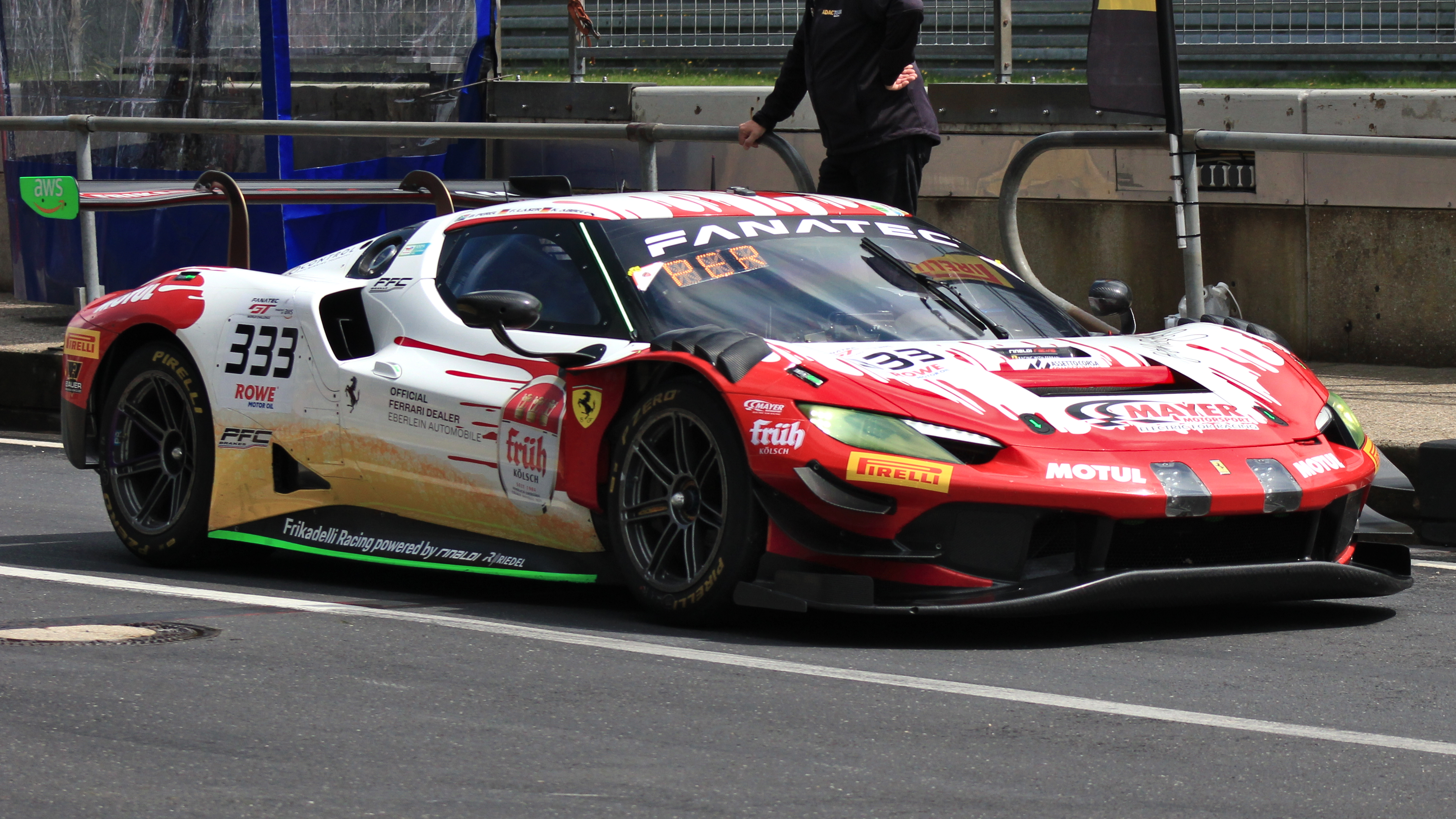
- Perel in 2024
- Nationality: (South Africa) South African
- Born: David Slingsby Perel; 7 May 1985 (age 41) Cape Town, Western Cape, South Africa
- Categorisation: FIA Bronze (2016–2017); FIA Silver (2018–)

Previous series
- 2023 2021–22 2021–22 2020 2019 2016, 2018 2015, 2019, 2021 2014–15 2008, 2010, 2012–14: GT Cup Open Europe; FIA World Endurance Championship; Asian Le Mans Series; Le Mans Cup; 24H Series; International GT Open; Italian GT Championship; Lamborghini Super Trofeo Europe; Formula Volkswagen South Africa

Championship titles
- 2017 2017 2017: Blancpain GT Series – Am Cup; Blancpain GT Series Endurance Cup – Am Cup; Blancpain GT Series Sprint Cup – Am Cup

David Slingsby Perel (born 7 May 1985 in Cape Town) is a South African racing driver competing in the European Le Mans Series for Spirit of Race, the GT World Challenge Europe Endurance Cup for Rinaldi Racing and the Nürburgring Langstrecken-Serie for Realize Kondo Racing with Rinaldi.

A Ferrari specialist, Perel was the champion of the Overall, Endurance and Sprint Am Cup classes in the 2017 Blancpain GT Series. He is an avid simracer, and the founder of SimGrid and Coach Dave Academy.

== Karting record ==
=== Karting career summary ===
Season	Series	Team	Position
2003	RCM South Africa - Senior Max		18th
2004	RCM South Africa - Senior Max		?
2006	RCM South Africa - Senior Max		4th
2007	RMC Grand Finals - Senior Max		6th

== Racing record ==
=== Racing career summary ===
Season	Series	Team	Races	Wins	Poles	F/Laps	Podiums	Points	Position
2008	Formula Volkswagen South Africa	Sam Racing	7	0	0	0	1	26	10th
2010	Formula Volkswagen South Africa		2	0	0	0	0	8	14th
2012	Formula Volkswagen South Africa		2	0	0	0	0	1	20th
2013	Formula Volkswagen South Africa		?	0	0	0	1	11	11th
2014	Formula Volkswagen South Africa		4	0	0	0	1	18	9th
2014	Lamborghini Super Trofeo Europe - Pro/Am		1	0	0	0	0	?	?
2015	Italian GT Championship - Sprint GTC	Bonaldi Motorsport	14	5	4	4	7	143	**2nd**
2015	Lamborghini Super Trofeo Europe - Gallardo Am	Bonaldi Motorsport	2	2	0	1	2	30	10th
2016	Blancpain GT Series	Kessel Racing; Team Parker Racing	6	0	0	0	0	0	NC
2016	Blancpain GT Series - Am	Kessel Racing; Team Parker Racing	6	1	2	2	2	58	10th
2016	Blancpain GT Series Endurance Cup	Kessel Racing; Team Parker Racing	4	0	0	0	0	0	NC
2016	Blancpain GT Series Endurance Cup - Am	Kessel Racing; Team Parker Racing	4	0	2	1	0	29	13th
2016	Blancpain GT Series Sprint Cup	Kessel Racing	2	0	0	0	0	0	NC
2016	Blancpain GT Series Sprint Cup - Am	Kessel Racing	2	1	0	1	2	29	4th
2016	International GT Open - GT3 AM	Kessel Racing	2	1	0	0	1	0	NC
2017	Blancpain GT Series	Kessel Racing	11	0	0	0	0	0	NC
2017	Blancpain GT Series - Am	Kessel Racing	11	7	6	8	9	195	**1st**
2017	Blancpain GT Series Endurance Cup	Kessel Racing	5	0	0	0	0	0	NC
2017	Blancpain GT Series Endurance Cup - Am	Kessel Racing	5	2	3	4	4	118	**1st**
2017	Blancpain GT Series Sprint Cup	Kessel Racing	6	0	0	0	0	0	NC
2017	Blancpain GT Series Sprint Cup - Am	Kessel Racing	6	5	3	6	5	77	**1st**
2017	Intercontinental GT Challenge	Kessel Racing	1	0	0	0	0	0	NC
2018	Blancpain GT Series Endurance Cup	Rinaldi Racing	1	0	0	0	0	0	NC
2018	Blancpain GT Series Endurance Cup - Pro-Am	Rinaldi Racing	1	1	0	0	1	43	8th
2018	Blancpain GT Series Sprint Cup	Rinaldi Racing	2	0	0	0	0	0.5	27th
2018	Blancpain GT Series Sprint Cup - Pro-Am	Rinaldi Racing	2	1	0	0	1	16.5	5th
2019	24H Series - Europe - A6	Wochenspiegel Team Monschau	3	0	0	0	0	34	16th
2019	Blancpain GT Series Endurance Cup	Rinaldi Racing	5	0	0	0	0	4	31st
2019	Blancpain GT Series Endurance Cup - Silver	Rinaldi Racing	5	0	0	0	1	46	7th
2019	Blancpain GT World Challenge Europe	Rinaldi Racing	10	0	0	0	0	0	NC
2019	Blancpain GT World Challenge Europe - Silver	Rinaldi Racing	10	3	3	2	5	102.5	**2nd**
2019	Italian GT Championship - Endurance - GT3 Pro/Am	Rinaldi Racing	1	1	0	0	1	?	?
2019	Intercontinental GT Challenge	Wochenspiegel Team Monschau by Rinaldi	1	0	0	0	0	0	NC
2019	European Le Mans Series - LMGTE	Kessel Racing	2	0	0	0	1	28	11th
2019	VLN Series - Cup 5	Pixum Team Adrenalin Motorsport	1	0	0	0	0	6.9	54th
2019	VLN Series - V6	Pixum Team Adrenalin Motorsport	1	0	0	0	0	?	?
2019	VLN Series - V5		1	0	0	0	0	?	?
2020	European Le Mans Series - LMGTE	Kessel Racing	5	2	1	0	4	99	**2nd**
2020	Le Mans Cup - GT3	Kessel Racing	7	1	2	1	5	92	**2nd**
2020	Intercontinental GT Challenge	Rinaldi Racing	1	0	0	0	0	0	NC
2020	GT World Challenge Europe Endurance Cup	Rinaldi Racing	2	0	0	0	0	0	NC
2020	GT World Challenge Europe Endurance Cup - Pro-Am	Rinaldi Racing	2	0	0	0	0	18	18th
2021	Asian Le Mans Series - GT	Rinaldi Racing	4	0	0	0	2	49	**3rd**
2021	GT World Challenge Europe Endurance Cup - Silver	Rinaldi Racing	3	0	0	0	0	22	21st
2021	GT World Challenge Europe Sprint Cup	Rinaldi Racing	2	0	0	0	0	2	30th
2021	GT World Challenge Europe Sprint Cup - Silver	Rinaldi Racing	2	0	0	0	0	7.5	17th
2021	Intercontinental GT Challenge	Rinaldi Racing	1	0	0	0	0	0	NC
2021	European Le Mans Series - LMGTE	Spirit of Race	6	1	1	1	4	89	**2nd**
2021	24 Hours of Le Mans - LMGTE	Spirit of Race	1	0	0	0	0	N/A	DNF
2021	Italian GT Endurance Championship - GT3	Kessel Racing	3	0	0	0	0	11	12th
2022	Asian Le Mans Series - GT	Rinaldi Racing	4	1	0	0	2	57	**3rd**
2022	European Le Mans Series - LMGTE	Spirit of Race	4	0	0	0	2	39	10th
2022	24 Hours of Le Mans - LMGTE	Spirit of Race	1	0	0	0	0	N/A	43rd
2022	Intercontinental GT Challenge	AF Corse	1	0	0	0	0	0	NC
2022	GT World Challenge Europe Endurance Cup	AF Corse	1	0	0	0	0	0	NC
2022	GT World Challenge Europe Endurance Cup - Gold	AF Corse	1	0	0	0	0	0	NC
2023	European Le Mans Series - LMGTE	Spirit of Race	6	0	0	0	1	55	5th
2023	GT Cup Open Europe - Pro-Am	Kessel Racing	2	0	1	0	0	0	13th
2024	GT World Challenge Europe Endurance Cup	Rinaldi Racing	5	0	0	0	0	0	NC
2024	GT World Challenge Europe Endurance Cup - Bronze	Rinaldi Racing	5	0	0	0	0	10	31st
2024	Gulf 12 Hours	Rinaldi Racing	1	0	0	0	0	N/A	9th
2024	European Le Mans Series - LMGT3	Spirit of Race	6	1	0	0	1	45	9th
2025	European Le Mans Series - LMGT3	Spirit of Race	6	0	0	0	1	52	6th
2025	GT World Challenge Europe Endurance Cup	Rinaldi Racing	4	0	0	0	0	0	NC
2025	GT World Challenge Europe Endurance Cup - Bronze	Rinaldi Racing	3	0	0	0	0	5	36th
2025	GT World Challenge Europe Endurance Cup - Silver	Rinaldi Racing	1	0	0	0	0	0	NC
2025	Nürburgring Langstrecken-Serie - SP9 Pro	Realize Kondo Racing with Rinaldi	3	0	0	0	0	0	NC
2025	Nürburgring Langstrecken-Serie - SP9 Pro-Am	Realize Kondo Racing with Rinaldi	1	0	0	0	0	0	NC
2025	Intercontinental GT Challenge	Realize Kondo Racing with Rinaldi	1	0	0	0	0	4	30th
2025	Intercontinental GT Challenge	Rinaldi Racing	1	0	0	0	0	4	30th
2026	Nürburgring Langstrecken-Serie - SP9	Realize Kondo Racing with Rinaldi							
2026	24 Hours of Nürburgring - SP9	Realize Kondo Racing with Rinaldi	1	0	0	0	0	N/A	DNF
2026	European Le Mans Series - LMGT3	Spirit of Race	6	0	0	0	0	38	9th
2026	Italian GT Championship Endurance Cup - GT3	Spirit of Race	4	0	1	1	1	31	7th
2026	Italian GT Championship Sprint Cup - GT3	Spirit of Race	5	0	0	0	0	6	18th
2026	GT World Challenge Europe Endurance Cup	Rinaldi Racing	5	0	0	0	0	0	NC
2026	International GT Open	AF Corse	2	0	0	0	0	7	36th
2026-27	Asian Le Mans Series - GT3	AF Corse							

^{*} Season still in progress.

=== Complete GT World Challenge Europe results ===
==== GT World Challenge Europe Endurance Cup ====
(key) (Races in bold indicate pole position) (Races in italics indicate fastest lap)

Year	Team	Car	Class	1	2	3	4	5	6	7	Pos.	Points
2016	Kessel Racing	Ferrari 458 Italia GT3	Am	MNZ; Ret	**SIL**; Ret	**LEC**; 28					13th	29
2016	Team Parker Racing	Bentley Continental GT3	Am				SPA; 6H; 61	SPA; 12H; 53	SPA; 24H; 54	NÜR	13th	29
2017	Kessel Racing	Ferrari 488 GT3	Am	MNZ; Ret	**SIL**; 39	LEC; 28	**SPA**; **6H**; 29	SPA; 12H; 26	SPA; 24H; 22	**CAT**; 39	1st	118
2018	Rinaldi Racing	Ferrari 488 GT3	Pro-Am	MNZ	SIL	LEC	SPA; 6H; 18	SPA; 12H; 21	SPA; 24H; 15	CAT	8th	43
2019	Rinaldi Racing	Ferrari 488 GT3	Silver	MNZ; 25	SIL; 13	LEC; 16	SPA; 6H; 57	SPA; 12H; 61	SPA; 24H; Ret	CAT; 8	7th	46
2020	Rinaldi Racing	Ferrari 488 GT3	Pro-Am	IMO	NÜR	SPA; 6H; 40	SPA; 12H; 33	SPA; 24H; 22	LEC; Ret		18th	18
2021	Rinaldi Racing	Ferrari 488 GT3 Evo 2020	Silver	MON	LEC	SPA; 6H; 22	SPA; 12H; 17	SPA; 24H; 30	NÜR; 32	CAT; 17	21st	22
2022	AF Corse	Ferrari 488 GT3 Evo 2020	Gold	IMO	LEC	SPA; 6H; 52	SPA; 12H; 47	SPA; 24H; 33	HOC	CAT	26th	6
2024	Rinaldi Racing	Ferrari 296 GT3	Bronze	LEC; 32	SPA; 6H; Ret	SPA; 12H; Ret	SPA; 24H; Ret	NÜR; 36	MNZ; 25	JED; Ret	31st	10
2025	Rinaldi Racing	Ferrari 296 GT3	Bronze	LEC; 41	MNZ; 38	SPA; 6H; 44	SPA; 12H; 49	SPA; 24H; 41			36th	5
2025	Rinaldi Racing	Ferrari 296 GT3	Silver						NÜR; DNS	CAT; 38	NC	0
2026	Rinaldi Racing	Ferrari 296 GT3 Evo	Silver	LEC; 42	MNZ; 19	SPA; 6H; 42	SPA; 12H; 29	SPA; 24H; 14	NÜR; Ret	ALG; 41	13th	35

==== GT World Challenge Europe Sprint Cup ====
Year	Team	Car	Class	1	2	3	4	5	6	7	8	9	10	Pos.	Points
2016	Kessel Racing	Ferrari 488 GT3	Am	MIS; QR	MIS; CR	BRH; QR	BRH; CR	NÜR; QR	NÜR; CR	HUN; QR; 31	HUN; CR; 25	CAT; QR	CAT; CR	4th	29
2017	Kessel Racing	Ferrari 458 Italia GT3	Am	MIS; QR	MIS; CR	BRH; QR	BRH; CR	**ZOL**; **QR**; 30	ZOL; CR; 4	**HUN**; **QR**; 30	HUN; CR; Ret	**NÜR**; **QR**; 28	NÜR; CR; 27	1st	77
2018	Rinaldi Racing	Ferrari 488 GT3	Pro-Am	ZOL; 1	ZOL; 2	BRH; 1	BRH; 2	MIS; 1	MIS; 2	HUN; 1	HUN; 2	NÜR; 1 Ret	NÜR; 2; 10	5th	16.5
2019	Rinaldi Racing	Ferrari 488 GT3	Pro-Am	BRH; 1; 13	BRH; 2; 16	MIS; 1; 12	MIS; 2; 22	ZAN; 1; 25	ZAN; 2; 15	**NÜR**; **1**; 20	**NÜR**; **2**; 24	**HUN**; **1**; 25	HUN; 2 Ret	2nd	102.5
2021	Rinaldi Racing	Ferrari 488 GT3 Evo 2020	Silver	MAG; 1	MAG; 2	ZAN; 1 Ret	ZAN; 2; 8	MIS; 1	MIS; 2	BRH; 1	BRH; 2	VAL; 1	VAL; 2	17th	7.5

=== Complete Intercontinental GT Challenge results ===
(key) (Races in bold indicate pole position; results in italics indicate fastest lap)

Year	Manufacturer	Car	1	2	3	4	5	Pos.	Points
2017	Ferrari	Ferrari 488 GT3	BAT	SPA; 22	LAG			NC	0
2019	Ferrari	Ferrari 488 GT3	BAT	LAG	SPA	SUZ	KYA; 13	NC	0
2020	Ferrari	Ferrari 488 GT3	BAT	IND	SPA; 19	KYA		NC	0
2021	Ferrari	Ferrari 488 GT3	SPA; 17	IND	KYA			NC	0
2022	Ferrari	Ferrari 488 GT3 Evo 2020	BAT	SPA; 33	IND	GUL		NC	0
2025	Ferrari	Ferrari 296 GT3	BAT	NÜR; 8	SPA; 27	SUZ	IND	30th	4
2026	Ferrari	Ferrari 296 GT3 Evo	BAT	NÜR; Ret	SPA; 13	SUZ	IND	NC	0

^{*} Season still in progress.

=== Complete European Le Mans Series results ===
(key) (Races in bold indicate pole position; results in italics indicate fastest lap)

Year	Entrant	Class	Chassis	Engine	1	2	3	4	5	6	Rank	Points
2019	Kessel Racing	LMGTE	Ferrari 488 GTE Evo	Ferrari F154CB 3.9 L Turbo V8	LEC	MNZ	CAT	SIL	SPA; 5	ALG; 2	11th	28
2020	Kessel Racing	LMGTE	Ferrari 488 GTE Evo	Ferrari F154CB 3.9 L Turbo V8	**LEC**; **2**	SPA; 1	LEC; 4	MNZ; 1	ALG; 2		2nd	99
2021	Spirit of Race	LMGTE	Ferrari 488 GTE Evo	Ferrari F154CB 3.9 L Turbo V8	CAT; 3	RBR; 2	LEC; 2	**MNZ**; **1**	SPA; NC	ALG; 4	2nd	89
2022	Spirit of Race	LMGTE	Ferrari 488 GTE Evo	Ferrari F154CB 3.9 L Turbo V8	LEC; 9	IMO; 3	MNZ; 8	CAT; 2	SPA	ALG	10th	39
2023	Spirit of Race	LMGTE	Ferrari 488 GTE Evo	Ferrari F154CB 3.9 L Turbo V8	CAT; 5	LEC; 5	ARA; 6	SPA; 7	POR; 7	ALG; 3	5th	55
2024	Spirit of Race	LMGT3	Ferrari 296 GT3	Ferrari F163CE 3.0 L Turbo V6	CAT; 5	LEC; 1	IMO; 8	SPA; Ret	MUG; Ret	ALG; 7	9th	45
2025	Spirit of Race	LMGT3	Ferrari 296 GT3	Ferrari F163CE 3.0 L Turbo V6	CAT; 4	LEC; 4	IMO; 3	SPA; 10	SIL; 8	ALG; 6	6th	52
2026	Spirit of Race	LMGT3	Ferrari 296 GT3 Evo	Ferrari F163CE 3.0 L Turbo V6	CAT; 6	LEC; 4	IMO; 9	SPA; 7	SIL; 5	ALG; 12	9th	38

^{*} Season still in progress.

=== Complete Asian Le Mans Series results ===
(key) (Races in bold indicate pole position; results in italics indicate fastest lap)

Year	Entrant	Class	Chassis	Engine	1	2	3	4	5	6	Rank	Points
2021	Rinaldi Racing	GT	Ferrari 488 GT3	Ferrari F154CB 3.9 L Turbo V8	DUB; 1; 8	DUB; 2; 2	ABU; 1; 4	ABU; 2; 3			3rd	49
2022	Rinaldi Racing	GT	Ferrari 488 GT3 Evo 2020	Ferrari F154CB 3.9 L Turbo V8	DUB; 1; 2	DUB; 2; 1	ABU; 1; 7	ABU; 2; 6			3rd	57
2026–27	AF Corse	GT	Ferrari 296 GT3 Evo	Ferrari F163CE 3.0 L Turbo V6	LEC; 1; 5	**LEC**; **2**; 2	JER; 1	JER; 2	ALG; 1	ALG; 2	2nd*	29*

^{*} Season still in progress.

=== Complete 24 Hours of Le Mans results ===
Year	Team	Co-Drivers	Car	Class	Laps	Pos.	Class Pos.
2021	(Switzerland) Spirit of Race	(United Kingdom) Duncan Cameron (Republic of Ireland) Matt Griffin	Ferrari 488 GTE Evo	LMGTE AM	109	DNF	DNF
2022	(Switzerland) Spirit of Race	(United Kingdom) Duncan Cameron (Republic of Ireland) Matt Griffin	Ferrari 488 GTE Evo	LMGTE AM	339	43rd	10th
