= 2021 GT World Challenge Europe Sprint Cup =

9th season of the GT World Challenge Europe Sprint Cup

The 2021 Fanatec GT World Challenge Europe Sprint Cup was the ninth season of the GT World Challenge Europe Sprint Cup following on from the demise of the SRO Motorsports Group's FIA GT1 World Championship (an auto racing series for grand tourer cars) and the second season after title sponsor Blancpain withdrew sponsorship. The season began on 7 May at Circuit de Nevers Magny-Cours in France and ended on 26 September at Circuit Ricardo Tormo in Valencia.

== Calendar ==
Round	Circuit	Date
1	(France) Circuit de Nevers Magny-Cours, Magny-Cours	7–9 May
2	(Netherlands) Circuit Zandvoort, Zandvoort	18–20 June
3	(Italy) Misano World Circuit Marco Simoncelli, Misano Adriatico	2–4 July
4	(United Kingdom) Brands Hatch, Kent	28–29 August
5	(Spain) Circuit Ricardo Tormo, Cheste	25–26 September

== Entry List ==
Team	Car	No.	Drivers	Class	Rounds
(Germany) / Mercedes-AMG Team Toksport (Note: Car No. 6 entered as Mercedes-AMG Team Toksport and car No. 7 entered as Toksport WRT.); (Germany) / Toksport WRT	Mercedes-AMG GT3 Evo	6	(Germany) Maro Engel	P	All
(Germany) / Mercedes-AMG Team Toksport; (Germany) / Toksport WRT	Mercedes-AMG GT3 Evo	6	(Germany) Luca Stolz	P	All
(Germany) / Mercedes-AMG Team Toksport; (Germany) / Toksport WRT	Mercedes-AMG GT3 Evo	7	(Finland) Juuso Puhakka	S	All
(Germany) / Mercedes-AMG Team Toksport; (Germany) / Toksport WRT	Mercedes-AMG GT3 Evo	7	(Colombia) Óscar Tunjo	S	All
(United Kingdom) RAM Racing	Mercedes-AMG GT3 Evo	8	(United Kingdom) Adam Christodoulou	PA	4
(United Kingdom) RAM Racing	Mercedes-AMG GT3 Evo	8	(Macau) Kevin Tse	PA	4
(Switzerland) Emil Frey Racing	Lamborghini Huracán GT3 Evo	14	(Switzerland) Alex Fontana	S	All
(Switzerland) Emil Frey Racing	Lamborghini Huracán GT3 Evo	14	(France) Arthur Rougier	S	1
(Switzerland) Emil Frey Racing	Lamborghini Huracán GT3 Evo	14	(Switzerland) Ricardo Feller	S	2–5
(Switzerland) Emil Frey Racing	Lamborghini Huracán GT3 Evo	114	(United Kingdom) Jack Aitken	P	1–3
(Switzerland) Emil Frey Racing	Lamborghini Huracán GT3 Evo	114	(Finland) Konsta Lappalainen	P	1–3
(Switzerland) Emil Frey Racing	Lamborghini Huracán GT3 Evo	114	(Finland) Konsta Lappalainen	S	4–5
(Switzerland) Emil Frey Racing	Lamborghini Huracán GT3 Evo	114	(France) Arthur Rougier	S	4–5
(Switzerland) Emil Frey Racing	Lamborghini Huracán GT3 Evo	163	(Spain) Albert Costa	P	All
(Switzerland) Emil Frey Racing	Lamborghini Huracán GT3 Evo	163	(Switzerland) Ricardo Feller	P	1
(Switzerland) Emil Frey Racing	Lamborghini Huracán GT3 Evo	163	(Austria) Norbert Siedler	P	2–5
(Germany) SPS Automotive Performance	Mercedes-AMG GT3 Evo	20	(Germany) Valentin Pierburg	PA	All
(Germany) SPS Automotive Performance	Mercedes-AMG GT3 Evo	20	(Austria) Dominik Baumann	PA	All
(Germany) SPS Automotive Performance	Mercedes-AMG GT3 Evo	40	(Australia) Jordan Love	S	3
(Germany) SPS Automotive Performance	Mercedes-AMG GT3 Evo	40	(Germany) Lance David Arnold	S	3
(France) Saintéloc Racing	Audi R8 LMS Evo	25	(France) Léo Roussel	P	All
(France) Saintéloc Racing	Audi R8 LMS Evo	25	(Germany) Christopher Haase	P	All
(France) Saintéloc Racing	Audi R8 LMS Evo	26	(France) Aurélien Panis	P	All
(France) Saintéloc Racing	Audi R8 LMS Evo	26	(Belgium) Frédéric Vervisch	P	All
(France) Saintéloc Racing	Audi R8 LMS Evo	27	(United Kingdom) Finlay Hutchison	P	3
(France) Saintéloc Racing	Audi R8 LMS Evo	27	(Germany) Markus Winkelhock	P	3
(United Kingdom) ROFGO Racing with Team WRT	Audi R8 LMS Evo	30	(Denmark) Benjamin Goethe	P	All
(United Kingdom) ROFGO Racing with Team WRT	Audi R8 LMS Evo	30	(South Africa) Kelvin van der Linde	P	1, 3
(United Kingdom) ROFGO Racing with Team WRT	Audi R8 LMS Evo	30	(Germany) Markus Winkelhock	P	2
(United Kingdom) ROFGO Racing with Team WRT	Audi R8 LMS Evo	30	(Germany) Christopher Mies	P	4
(United Kingdom) ROFGO Racing with Team WRT	Audi R8 LMS Evo	30	(Netherlands) Robin Frijns	P	5
(Belgium) Belgian Audi Club Team WRT	Audi R8 LMS Evo	31	(United Kingdom) Frank Bird	S	All
(Belgium) Belgian Audi Club Team WRT	Audi R8 LMS Evo	31	(Japan) Ryuichiro Tomita	S	All
(Belgium) Belgian Audi Club Team WRT	Audi R8 LMS Evo	32	(Belgium) Charles Weerts	P	All
(Belgium) Belgian Audi Club Team WRT	Audi R8 LMS Evo	32	(Belgium) Dries Vanthoor	P	All
(Germany) Rinaldi Racing	Ferrari 488 GT3 Evo 2020	33	(Chile) Benjamín Hites	S	1–4
(Germany) Rinaldi Racing	Ferrari 488 GT3 Evo 2020	33	(Finland) Patrick Kujala	S	1, 3–4
(Germany) Rinaldi Racing	Ferrari 488 GT3 Evo 2020	33	(South Africa) David Perel	S	2
(United Kingdom) Jota Sport	McLaren 720S GT3	38	(United Kingdom) Oliver Wilkinson	P	1, 3–5
(United Kingdom) Jota Sport	McLaren 720S GT3	38	(United Kingdom) Ben Barnicoat	P	1, 3–5
(Italy) AF Corse	Ferrari 488 GT3 Evo 2020	52	(Belgium) Louis Machiels	PA	All
(Italy) AF Corse	Ferrari 488 GT3 Evo 2020	52	(Italy) Andrea Bertolini	PA	All
(Italy) Dinamic Motorsport	Porsche 911 GT3 R	54	(Belgium) Adrien de Leener	P	1–3, 5
(Italy) Dinamic Motorsport	Porsche 911 GT3 R	54	(Germany) Christian Engelhart	P	1–3, 5
(Germany) Attempto Racing	Audi R8 LMS Evo	55	(Germany) Alex Aka	S	2
(Germany) Attempto Racing	Audi R8 LMS Evo	55	(Germany) Dennis Marschall	S	2
(Germany) Attempto Racing	Audi R8 LMS Evo	66	(Germany) Alex Aka	P	1
(Germany) Attempto Racing	Audi R8 LMS Evo	66	(Germany) Christopher Mies	P	1–3
(Germany) Attempto Racing	Audi R8 LMS Evo	66	(Germany) Jusuf Owega	P	2
(Germany) Attempto Racing	Audi R8 LMS Evo	66	(France) Fabien Lavergne	P	3
(Germany) Attempto Racing	Audi R8 LMS Evo	66	(Italy) Mattia Drudi	P	4–5
(Germany) Attempto Racing	Audi R8 LMS Evo	66	(Austria) Max Hofer	P	4
(Germany) Attempto Racing	Audi R8 LMS Evo	66	(Italy) Kikko Galbiati	P	5
(Germany) Attempto Racing	Audi R8 LMS Evo	99	(Italy) Tommaso Mosca	P	1–2
(Germany) Attempto Racing	Audi R8 LMS Evo	99	(Italy) Mattia Drudi	P	1–2
(Germany) Attempto Racing	Audi R8 LMS Evo	99	(Germany) Alex Aka	S	3–5
(Germany) Attempto Racing	Audi R8 LMS Evo	99	(Germany) Dennis Marschall	S	3–5
(United Kingdom) Barwell Motorsport	Lamborghini Huracán GT3 Evo	77	(Portugal) Henrique Chaves	PA	All
(United Kingdom) Barwell Motorsport	Lamborghini Huracán GT3 Evo	77	(Portugal) Miguel Ramos	PA	All
(France) AKKA ASP Team	Mercedes-AMG GT3 Evo	87	(Russia) Konstantin Tereshchenko	S	All
(France) AKKA ASP Team	Mercedes-AMG GT3 Evo	87	(France) Jim Pla	S	All
(France) AKKA ASP Team	Mercedes-AMG GT3 Evo	88	(Russia) Timur Boguslavskiy	P	All
(France) AKKA ASP Team	Mercedes-AMG GT3 Evo	88	(Italy) Raffaele Marciello	P	All
(France) AKKA ASP Team	Mercedes-AMG GT3 Evo	89	(Romania) Petru Umbrărescu	P	All
(France) AKKA ASP Team	Mercedes-AMG GT3 Evo	89	(France) Jules Gounon	P	All
(Spain) Madpanda Motorsport	Mercedes-AMG GT3 Evo	90	(Argentina) Ezequiel Pérez Companc	S	All
(Spain) Madpanda Motorsport	Mercedes-AMG GT3 Evo	90	(Netherlands) Rik Breukers	S	All
(United Kingdom) Sky - Tempesta Racing	Ferrari 488 GT3 Evo 2020	93	(United Kingdom) Chris Froggatt	S	All
(United Kingdom) Sky - Tempesta Racing	Ferrari 488 GT3 Evo 2020	93	(Italy) Giorgio Roda	S	1–4
(United Kingdom) Sky - Tempesta Racing	Ferrari 488 GT3 Evo 2020	93	(Italy) Eddie Cheever	S	5
(France) CMR	Bentley Continental GT3	107	(Belgium) Ulysse de Pauw	S	All
(France) CMR	Bentley Continental GT3	107	(France) Pierre-Alexandre Jean	S	All
(France) CMR	Bentley Continental GT3	108	(Monaco) Stéphane Richelmi	P	All
(France) CMR	Bentley Continental GT3	108	(Belgium) Benjamin Lessennes	P	1
(France) CMR	Bentley Continental GT3	108	(France) Nelson Panciatici	P	2–5
(United Kingdom) Garage 59	Aston Martin Vantage AMR GT3	159	(Finland) Tuomas Tujula	S	All
(United Kingdom) Garage 59	Aston Martin Vantage AMR GT3	159	(Denmark) Nicolai Kjærgaard	S	All
(United Kingdom) Garage 59	Aston Martin Vantage AMR GT3	188	(Sweden) Alexander West	PA	All
(United Kingdom) Garage 59	Aston Martin Vantage AMR GT3	188	(United Kingdom) Jonathan Adam	PA	All
(Germany) Allied-Racing	Porsche 911 GT3 R	222	(Switzerland) Julien Apothéloz	P	3–5
(Germany) Allied-Racing	Porsche 911 GT3 R	222	(Austria) Klaus Bachler	P	3–5

Icon	Class
P	Pro Cup
S	Silver Cup
PA	Pro-Am Cup
Am	Am Cup

== Race results ==
Bold indicates overall winner.

Round		Circuit	Pole position	Pro winners	Silver winners	Pro/Am winners	Am winners	Report
1	R1	(France) Magny-Cours	(Belgium) No. 32 Team WRT	**(Belgium) No. 32 Team WRT**	(Switzerland) No. 14 Emil Frey Racing	(Italy) No. 52 AF Corse	No Entries	report
1	R1	(France) Magny-Cours	(Belgium) Dries Vanthoor (Belgium) Charles Weerts	**(Belgium) Dries Vanthoor** **(Belgium) Charles Weerts**	(Switzerland) Alex Fontana (France) Arthur Rougier	(Italy) Andrea Bertolini (Belgium) Louis Machiels	No Entries	report
1	R2	(France) Magny-Cours	(Germany) No. 6 Toksport WRT	**(Germany) No. 6 Toksport WRT**	(France) No. 87 AKKA ASP	(United Kingdom) No. 77 Barwell Motorsport	No Entries	report
1	R2	(France) Magny-Cours	(Germany) Maro Engel (Germany) Luca Stolz	**(Germany) Maro Engel** **(Germany) Luca Stolz**	(Russia) Konstantin Tereshchenko (France) Jim Pla	(Portugal) Henrique Chaves (Portugal) Miguel Ramos	No Entries	report
2	R1	(Netherlands) Zandvoort	(Switzerland) No. 14 Emil Frey Racing	(France) No. 88 AKKA ASP	**(Switzerland) No. 14 Emil Frey Racing**	(United Kingdom) No. 77 Barwell Motorsport	No Entries	report
2	R1	(Netherlands) Zandvoort	(Switzerland) Ricardo Feller (Switzerland) Alex Fontana	(Russia) Timur Boguslavskiy (Italy) Raffaele Marciello	**(Switzerland) Ricardo Feller** **(Switzerland) Alex Fontana**	(Portugal) Henrique Chaves (Portugal) Miguel Ramos	No Entries	report
2	R2	(Netherlands) Zandvoort	(France) No. 88 AKKA ASP	**(Switzerland) No. 163 Emil Frey Racing**	(Switzerland) No. 14 Emil Frey Racing	(Germany) No. 20 SPS Automotive Performance	No Entries	report
2	R2	(Netherlands) Zandvoort	(Russia) Timur Boguslavskiy (Italy) Raffaele Marciello	**(Spain) Albert Costa** **(Austria) Norbert Siedler**	(Switzerland) Ricardo Feller (Switzerland) Alex Fontana	(Germany) Valentin Pierburg (Austria) Dominik Baumann	No Entries	report
3	R1	(Italy) Misano	(Belgium) No. 32 Team WRT	**(Belgium) No. 32 Team WRT**	(France) No. 87 AKKA ASP	(United Kingdom) No. 77 Barwell Motorsport	No Entries	report
3	R1	(Italy) Misano	(Belgium) Dries Vanthoor (Belgium) Charles Weerts	**(Belgium) Dries Vanthoor** **(Belgium) Charles Weerts**	(Russia) Konstantin Tereshchenko (France) Jim Pla	(Portugal) Henrique Chaves (Portugal) Miguel Ramos	No Entries	report
3	R2	(Italy) Misano	(United Kingdom) No. 188 Garage 59	**(Belgium) No. 32 Team WRT**	(Belgium) No. 31 Team WRT	(United Kingdom) No. 188 Garage 59	No Entries	report
3	R2	(Italy) Misano	(Sweden) Alexander West (United Kingdom) Jonathan Adam	**(Belgium) Dries Vanthoor** **(Belgium) Charles Weerts**	(United Kingdom) Frank Bird (Japan) Ryuichiro Tomita	(Sweden) Alexander West (United Kingdom) Jonathan Adam	No Entries	report
4	R1	(United Kingdom) Brands Hatch	(United Kingdom) No. 38 Jota Sport	**(Belgium) No. 32 Team WRT**	(Belgium) No. 31 Team WRT	(United Kingdom) No. 77 Barwell Motorsport	No Entries	report
4	R1	(United Kingdom) Brands Hatch	(United Kingdom) Ben Barnicoat (United Kingdom) Oliver Wilkinson	**(Belgium) Dries Vanthoor** **(Belgium) Charles Weerts**	(United Kingdom) Frank Bird (Japan) Ryuichiro Tomita	(Portugal) Henrique Chaves (Portugal) Miguel Ramos	No Entries	report
4	R2	(United Kingdom) Brands Hatch	(France) No. 88 AKKA ASP	**(Germany) No. 6 Toksport WRT**	(Germany) No. 7 Toksport WRT	(United Kingdom) No. 77 Barwell Motorsport	No Entries	report
4	R2	(United Kingdom) Brands Hatch	(Russia) Timur Boguslavskiy (Italy) Raffaele Marciello	**(Germany) Maro Engel** **(Germany) Luca Stolz**	(Finland) Juuso Puhakka (Colombia) Óscar Tunjo	(Portugal) Henrique Chaves (Portugal) Miguel Ramos	No Entries	report
5	R1	(Spain) Valencia	(United Kingdom) No. 38 Jota Sport	**(Germany) No. 6 Toksport WRT**	(Germany) No. 99 Attempto Racing	(Italy) No. 52 AF Corse	No Entries	report
5	R1	(Spain) Valencia	(United Kingdom) Ben Barnicoat (United Kingdom) Oliver Wilkinson	**(Germany) Maro Engel** **(Germany) Luca Stolz**	(Germany) Alex Aka (Germany) Dennis Marschall	(Italy) Andrea Bertolini (Belgium) Louis Machiels	No Entries	report
5	R2	(Spain) Valencia	(Germany) No. 6 Toksport WRT	**(Germany) No. 6 Toksport WRT**	(France) No. 87 AKKA ASP	(Germany) No. 20 SPS Automotive Performance	No Entries	report
5	R2	(Spain) Valencia	(Germany) Maro Engel (Germany) Luca Stolz	**(Germany) Maro Engel** **(Germany) Luca Stolz**	(Russia) Konstantin Tereshchenko (France) Jim Pla	(Germany) Valentin Pierburg (Austria) Dominik Baumann	No Entries	report

== Championship standings ==
Scoring system

Championship points are awarded for the first ten positions in each race. The pole-sitter also receives one point and entries are required to complete 75% of the winning car's race distance in order to be classified and earn points. Individual drivers are required to participate for a minimum of 25 minutes in order to earn championship points in any race.

Position	1st	2nd	3rd	4th	5th	6th	7th	8th	9th	10th	Pole
Points	16.5	12	9.5	7.5	6	4.5	3	2	1	0.5	1

== Drivers' championships ==
=== Overall ===
Pos.	Drivers	Team	MAG (France)		ZAN (Netherlands)		MIS (Italy)		BRH (United Kingdom)		VAL (Spain)		Points
1	(Belgium) Dries Vanthoor (Belgium) Charles Weerts	(Belgium) Belgian Audi Club Team WRT	1^{PF}	2	8	3	1^{P}	1^{F}	1	2	16	Ret	103.5
2	(Germany) Maro Engel (Germany) Luca Stolz	(Germany) Toksport WRT	25	1^{PF}	7	Ret	2	24	2	1^{F}	1	1^{P}	95
3	(Russia) Timur Boguslavskiy (Italy) Raffaele Marciello	(France) AKKA ASP Team	5	3	2	25^{P}	5	2	17^{F}	6^{P}	3^{F}	18	61.5
4	(Switzerland) Ricardo Feller	(Switzerland) Emil Frey Racing	2	26	1^{P}	2^{F}	8	11	11	8	17	12	45.5
5	(Switzerland) Alex Fontana	(Switzerland) Emil Frey Racing	3	8	1^{P}	2^{F}	8	11	11	8	17	12	45
6	(Spain) Albert Costa	(Switzerland) Emil Frey Racing	2	26	Ret^{F}	1	9	12	16	15	6	3	43.5
7	(Romania) Petru Umbrărescu (France) Jules Gounon	(France) AKKA ASP Team	10	24	13	6	12	7	12	3	5	2	35.5
8	(United Kingdom) Frank Bird (Japan) Ryuichiro Tomita	(Belgium) Belgian Audi Club Team WRT	24	11	4	7	26	4	3	5	14	16	33.5
9	(Austria) Norbert Siedler	(Switzerland) Emil Frey Racing			Ret^{F}	1	9	12	16	15	6	3	31.5
10	(Finland) Juuso Puhakka (Colombia) Óscar Tunjo	(Germany) Toksport WRT	7	23	5	10	10	9	6	4	Ret	8	25
11	(Germany) Christopher Haase (France) Léo Roussel	(France) Saintéloc Racing	Ret	10	11	16	3	Ret	10	10	2	10	23.5
12	(Russia) Konstantin Tereshchenko (France) Jim Pla	(France) AKKA ASP Team	17	5	6	19	6	Ret	11	7	10	6	23
13	(Belgium) Ulysse de Pauw (France) Pierre-Alexandre Jean	(France) CMR	9	7	3	5	Ret	16	7	12	Ret	15	22.5
14	(France) Aurélien Panis	(France) Saintéloc Racing	26	6	9	15	4	10	5	11	13	9	20.5
15	(Finland) Konsta Lappalainen	(Switzerland) Emil Frey Racing	12	9	15	4	7^{F}	5	8	20	9	Ret	20.5
16	(Belgium) Frédéric Vervisch	(France) Saintéloc Racing	26	6	9	15	4	10	5	11			19.5
17	(United Kingdom) Oliver Wilkinson (United Kingdom) Ben Barnicoat	(United Kingdom) Jota Sport	13	4			22	8	28^{P}	DNS	22†^{P}	4^{F}	19
18	(Argentina) Ezequiel Pérez Companc (Netherlands) Rik Breukers	(Spain) Madpanda Motorsport	4	13	Ret	9	14	14	4	16	Ret	7	19
19	(United Kingdom) Jack Aitken	(Switzerland) Emil Frey Racing	12	9	15	4	7^{F}	5					17.5
20	(France) Arthur Rougier	(Switzerland) Emil Frey Racing	3	8					8	20	9	Ret	14.5
21	(Denmark) Benjamin Goethe	(United Kingdom) ROFGO Racing with Team WRT	11	Ret	16	18	23	3	18	9	18	13	10.5
22	(South Africa) Kelvin van der Linde	(United Kingdom) ROFGO Racing with Team WRT	11	Ret			23	3					9.5
23	(Chile) Benjamín Hites	(Germany) Rinaldi Racing	8	22	Ret	8	11	6	9	18			9.5
24	(Germany) Alex Aka	(Germany) Attempto Racing	19	18	17	12	13	Ret	13	13	4	24†	7.5
24	(Germany) Dennis Marschall	(Germany) Attempto Racing			17	12	13	Ret	13	13	4	24†	7.5
25	(Finland) Patrick Kujala	(Germany) Rinaldi Racing	8	22			11	6	9	18			7.5
26	(Italy) Mattia Drudi	(Germany) Attempto Racing	6	12	14	17			15	14	8	11	6.5
27	(Germany) Christian Engelhart (Belgium) Adrien de Leener	(Italy) Dinamic Motorsport	16	20	12	24	Ret	DNS			12	5	6
28	(Italy) Tommaso Mosca	(Germany) Attempto Racing	6	12	14	17							4.5
29	(Monaco) Stéphane Richelmi	(France) CMR	14	15	20	14	17	20	20	23	7	Ret	3
29	(France) Nelson Panciatici	(France) CMR			20	14	17	20	20	23	7	Ret	3
30	(Italy) Kikko Galbiati	(Germany) Attempto Racing									8	11	2
30	(South Africa) David Perel	(Germany) Rinaldi Racing			Ret	8							2
31	(Germany) Christopher Mies	(Germany) Attempto Racing (United Kingdom) ROFGO Racing with Team WRT	19	18	10	11	Ret	17	18	9			1.5
32	(United Kingdom) Jonathan Adam (Sweden) Alexander West	(United Kingdom) Garage 59	22	21	23	21	21	18^{P}	23	24	Ret	20	1
34	(Germany) Jusuf Owega	(Germany) Attempto Racing			10	11							0.5
	(France) Fabien Lavergne	(Germany) Attempto Racing					Ret	17					0
	(Denmark) Nicolai Kjærgaard (Finland) Tuomas Tujula	(United Kingdom) Garage 59	15	25	24	13	Ret	13	24	19	Ret	19	0
	(Belgium) Benjamin Lessennes	(France) CMR	14	15									0
	(United Kingdom) Chris Froggatt	(United Kingdom) Sky - Tempesta Racing	20	14	19	23	19	22	26	22	15	17	0
	(Italy) Giorgio Roda	(United Kingdom) Sky - Tempesta Racing	20	14	19	23	19	22	26	22			0
	(Italy) Eddie Cheever III	(United Kingdom) Sky - Tempesta Racing									15	17	0
	(Portugal) Henrique Chaves (Portugal) Miguel Ramos	(United Kingdom) Barwell Motorsport	23	16	18	DNS	18	23	21	21	20	22	0
	(Germany) Markus Winkelhock	(United Kingdom) ROFGO Racing with Team WRT			16	18							0
	(Germany) Markus Winkelhock	(France) Saintéloc Racing					15	15					0
	(United Kingdom) Finlay Hutchison	(France) Saintéloc Racing					15	15					0
	(Germany) Valentin Pierburg (Austria) Dominik Baumann	(Germany) SPS Automotive Performance	21	17	22	20	24	19	25	25	21	14	0
	(Italy) Andrea Bertolini (Belgium) Louis Machiels	(Italy) AF Corse	18	19	21	22	25	25	22	26	19	23	0
	(Australia) Jordan Love (Germany) Lance David Arnold	(Germany) SPS Automotive Performance					16	21					0
	(Switzerland) Julien Apothéloz (Austria) Klaus Bachler	(Germany) Allied-Racing					20	26	19	17	11	21	0
	(Austria) Max Hofer	(Germany) Attempto Racing							15	14			0
	(United Kingdom) Adam Christodoulou (Macau) Kevin Tse	(United Kingdom) Ram Racing							27	Ret			0
Pos.	Drivers	Team	MAG (France)		ZAN (Netherlands)		MIS (Italy)		BRH (United Kingdom)		VAL (Spain)		Points

Key
Colour	Result
Gold	Race winner
Silver	2nd place
Bronze	3rd place
Green	Points finish
Blue	Non-points finish
Blue	Non-classified finish (NC)
Purple	Did not finish (Ret)
Black	Disqualified (DSQ)
Black	Excluded (EX)
White	Did not start (DNS)
White	Race cancelled (C)
White	Withdrew (WD)
Blank	Did not participate

P – Pole
F – Fastest Lap

Notes

- † – Drivers did not finish the race but were classified, as they completed more than 75% of the race distance.

=== Silver Cup ===
Pos.	Drivers	Team	MAG (France)		ZAN (Netherlands)		MIS (Italy)		BRH (United Kingdom)		VAL (Spain)		Points
1	(Switzerland) Alex Fontana	(Switzerland) Emil Frey Racing	3^{PF}	8^{PF}	1^{P}	2^{F}	8^{F}	11^{F}	14^{P}	8	17^{F}	12^{F}	103
2	(United Kingdom) Frank Bird (Japan) Ryuichiro Tomita	(Belgium) Belgian Audi Club Team WRT	24	11	4	7	26	4	3	5	14	16	85.5
3	(France) Jim Pla (Russia) Konstantin Tereshchenko	(France) AKKA ASP Team	17	5	6	19	6	Ret	11^{F}	7^{F}	10	6^{P}	82.5
4	(Finland) Juuso Puhakka (Colombia) Óscar Tunjo	(Germany) Toksport WRT	7	23	5	10	10	9	6	4^{P}	Ret^{P}	8	80
5	(Switzerland) Ricardo Feller	(Switzerland) Emil Frey Racing			1^{P}	2^{F}	8^{F}	11^{F}	14^{P}	8	17^{F}	12^{F}	75
6	(Belgium) Ulysse de Pauw (France) Pierre-Alexandre Jean	(France) CMR	9	7	3^{F}	5^{P}	Ret^{P}	16	7	12	Ret	15	66.5
7	(Netherlands) Rik Breukers (Argentina) Ezequiel Pérez Companc	(Spain) Madpanda Motorsport	4	13	Ret	9	14	14	4	16	Ret	7	60
8	(France) Arthur Rougier	(Switzerland) Emil Frey Racing	3^{PF}	8^{PF}					8	20	9	Ret	46.5
9	(Chile) Benjamín Hites	(Germany) Rinaldi Racing	8	22	Ret	8	11	6^{P}	9	18			45
10	(Finland) Patrick Kujala	(Germany) Rinaldi Racing	8	22			11	6^{P}	9	18			37.5
11	(Germany) Alex Aka (Germany) Dennis Marschall	(Germany) Attempto Racing			17	12	13	Ret	13	13	4	24†	37.5
12	(United Kingdom) Chris Froggatt	(United Kingdom) Sky - Tempesta Racing	20	14	19	23	19	22	26	22	15	17	22
13	(Denmark) Nicolai Kjærgaard (Finland) Tuomas Tujula	(United Kingdom) Garage 59	15	25	24	13	Ret	13	24	19	Ret	19	19
14	(Finland) Konsta Lappalainen	(Switzerland) Emil Frey Racing							8	20	9	Ret	18.5
15	(Italy) Giorgio Roda	(United Kingdom) Sky - Tempesta Racing	20	14	19	23	19	22	26	22			13
16	(Italy) Eddie Cheever III	(United Kingdom) Sky - Tempesta Racing									15	17	9
17	(South Africa) David Perel	(Germany) Rinaldi Racing			Ret	8							7.5
18	(Australia) Jordan Love (Germany) Lance David Arnold	(Germany) SPS Automotive Performance					16	21					5
Pos.	Drivers	Team	MAG (France)		ZAN (Netherlands)		MIS (Italy)		BRH (United Kingdom)		VAL (Spain)		Points

=== Pro/Am Cup ===
Pos.	Drivers	Team	MAG (France)		ZAN (Netherlands)		MIS (Italy)		BRH (United Kingdom)		VAL (Spain)		Points
1	(Portugal) Henrique Chaves (Portugal) Miguel Ramos	(United Kingdom) Barwell Motorsport	23^{F}	16	18^{PF}	DNS^{P}	18	23	21^{PF}	21^{P}	20^{F}	22	125
2	(Austria) Dominik Baumann (Germany) Valentin Pierburg	(Germany) SPS Automotive Performance	21	17	22	20	24^{F}	19	25	25^{F}	21^{P}	14^{PF}	116.5
3	(Italy) Andrea Bertolini (Belgium) Louis Machiels	(Italy) AF Corse	18	19^{F}	21	22	25^{P}	25	22	26	19	23	107
4	(United Kingdom) Jonathan Adam (Sweden) Alexander West	(United Kingdom) Garage 59	22^{P}	21^{P}	23	21^{F}	21	18^{PF}	23	24	Ret	20	101.5
5	(United Kingdom) Adam Christodoulou (Macau) Kevin Tse	(United Kingdom) Ram Racing							27	Ret			6
Pos.	Drivers	Team	MAG (France)		ZAN (Netherlands)		MIS (Italy)		BRH (United Kingdom)		VAL (Spain)		Points

== Team's championships ==
=== Overall ===
Pos.	Team	Manufacturer	MAG (France)		ZAN (Netherlands)		MIS (Italy)		BRH (United Kingdom)		VAL (Spain)		Points
1	(Belgium) Belgian Audi Club Team WRT (United Kingdom) ROFGO Racing with Team WRT	Audi	1^{PF}	2	4	3	1^{P}	1^{F}	1	2	14	13	113.5
2	(Germany) Toksport WRT	Mercedes-AMG	7	1^{PF}	5	10	2	9	2	1^{F}	1	1^{P}	110
3	(Switzerland) Emil Frey Racing	Lamborghini	2	8	1^{P}	1^{F}	7^{F}	5	8	8	6	3	92
4	(France) AKKA ASP Team	Mercedes-AMG	5	3	2	19^{P}	5	2	11^{F}	6^{P}	3^{F}	2	91
5	(France) Saintéloc Racing	Audi	26	6	9	15	3	10	5	10	2	9	52
6	(France) CMR	Bentley	9	7	3	5	17	16	7	12	7	15	41.5
7	(Spain) Madpanda Motorsport	Mercedes-AMG	4	13	Ret	9	14	14	4	16	Ret	7	34
8	(Germany) Attempto Racing	Audi	6	12	10	11	13	17	13	13	4	11	29.5
9	(Germany) Rinaldi Racing	Ferrari	8	22	Ret	8	11	6	9	18			24.5
10	(United Kingdom) Jota Sport	McLaren	17	4			22	8	28^{P}	DNS	22†^{P}	4^{F}	23
11	(Italy) Dinamic Motorsport	Porsche	15	20	12	24	Ret	DNS			12	5	10.5
12	(United Kingdom) Garage 59	Aston Martin	15	21	23	13	21	13^{P}	23	19	Ret	19	5
13	(Germany) Allied-Racing	Porsche					20	26	19	17	11	21	4.5
14	(Germany) SPS Automotive Performance	Mercedes-AMG	21	17	22	20	16	19	25	25	21	14	1.5
15	(United Kingdom) Sky - Tempesta Racing	Ferrari	20	14	19	23	19	22	26	22	15	17	1.5
16	(United Kingdom) Barwell Motorsport	Lamborghini	23	16	18	DNS	18	23	21	21	20	22	1
-	(Italy) AF Corse	Ferrari	18	19	21	22	25	25	22	26	19	23	0
-	(United Kingdom) Ram Racing	Mercedes-AMG							27	Ret			0
Pos.	Team	Manufacturer	MAG (France)		ZAN (Netherlands)		MIS (Italy)		BRH (United Kingdom)		VAL (Spain)		Points

=== Silver Cup ===
Pos.	Team	Manufacturer	MAG (France)		ZAN (Netherlands)		MIS (Italy)		BRH (United Kingdom)		VAL (Spain)		Points
1	(Switzerland) Emil Frey Racing	Lamborghini	3^{PF}	8^{PF}	1^{P}	2^{F}	8^{F}	11^{F}	14^{P}	8	17^{F}	12^{F}	115.5
2	(Belgium) Belgian Audi Club Team WRT	Audi	24	10	4	7	26	4	3	5	14	16	85.5
3	(France) AKKA ASP Team	Mercedes-AMG	17	5	6	19	6	Ret	11^{F}	7^{F}	10	6^{P}	82.5
4	(Germany) Toksport WRT	Mercedes-AMG	7	23	5	10	10	9	6	4^{P}	Ret^{P}	8	80
5	(France) CMR	Bentley	9	7	3^{F}	5^{P}	Ret^{P}	16	7	12	Ret	15	66.5
6	(Spain) Madpanda Motorsport	Mercedes-AMG	4	13	Ret	9	14	14	4	16	Ret	7	60
7	(Germany) Rinaldi Racing	Ferrari	8	22	Ret	8	11	6^{P}	9	18			45
8	(Germany) Attempto Racing	Audi			17	12	13	Ret	13	13	4	24†	37.5
9	(United Kingdom) Sky - Tempesta Racing	Ferrari	20	14	19	23	19	22	26	22	15	17	23
10	(United Kingdom) Garage 59	Aston Martin	15	25	24	13	Ret	13	24	19	Ret	19	5.5
11	(Germany) SPS Automotive Performance	Mercedes-AMG					16	21					5
Pos.	Team	Manufacturer	MAG (France)		ZAN (Netherlands)		MIS (Italy)		BRH (United Kingdom)		VAL (Spain)		Points

=== Pro/Am Cup ===
Pos.	Team	Manufacturer	MAG (France)		ZAN (Netherlands)		MIS (Italy)		BRH (United Kingdom)		VAL (Spain)		Points
1	(United Kingdom) Barwell Motorsport	Lamborghini	23^{F}	16	18^{PF}	DNS^{P}	18	23	21^{PF}	21^{P}	20^{F}	22	125
2	(Germany) SPS Automotive Performance	Mercedes-AMG	21	17	22	20	24^{F}	19	25	25^{F}	21^{P}	14^{PF}	116.5
3	(Italy) AF Corse	Ferrari	18	19^{F}	21	22	25^{P}	25	22	26	19	23	107
4	(United Kingdom) Garage 59	Aston Martin	22^{P}	21^{P}	23	21	21	18^{PF}	23	24	Ret	20	101.5
5	(United Kingdom) Ram Racing	Mercedes-AMG							27	Ret			6
Pos.	Team	Manufacturer	MAG (France)		ZAN (Netherlands)		MIS (Italy)		BRH (United Kingdom)		VAL (Spain)		Points

== See also ==
- 2021 GT World Challenge Europe
- 2021 GT World Challenge Europe Endurance Cup
- 2021 GT World Challenge Asia
- 2021 GT World Challenge America
- 2021 GT World Challenge Australia
