= 2021 GT World Challenge Europe Sprint Cup Zandvoort round =

(Netherlands) 2021 GT World Challenge Europe Sprint Cup Zandvoort round
Event Information
- Round 2 of 5 in the 2021 GT World Challenge Europe Sprint Cup
- Date: 18–20 June 2021 GT World Challenge Europe Sprint Cup
- Location: Zandvoort, North Holland, the Netherlands
- Venue: Circuit Zandvoort

Results
Race 1
Distance	37 laps	157.583 km
Pole position	(Switzerland) Ricardo Feller (Switzerland) Alex Fontana; Emil Frey Racing	1:33.586
Winner	(Switzerland) Ricardo Feller (Switzerland) Alex Fontana; Emil Frey Racing	1:00:48.141
Race 2
Distance	37 laps	157.583 km
Pole position	(Russia) Timur Boguslavskiy (Italy) Raffaele Marciello; AKKA ASP	1:34.304
Winner	(Austria) Norbert Siedler (Spain) Albert Costa; Emil Frey Racing	1:00:34.660

The 2021 GT World Challenge Europe Sprint Cup Zandvoort round was a motor racing event for the GT World Challenge Europe Sprint Cup, held on the weekend of 18 to 20 June 2021. The event was held at Circuit Zandvoort in Zandvoort, North Holland, the Netherlands and consisted of two races, both one hour in length. It was the second event in the 2021 GT World Challenge Europe Sprint Cup and hosted Races 3 and 4 of the season.

== Results ==
=== Race 1 ===
==== Qualifying ====
Pos.	No.	Driver	Team	Car	Class	Time	Gap
1	14	(Switzerland) Ricardo Feller (Switzerland) Alex Fontana	(Switzerland) Emil Frey Racing	Lamborghini Huracán GT3 Evo	S	1:33.586	
2	107	(France) Pierre-Alexandre Jean (Belgium) Ulysse de Pauw	(France) Classic and Modern Racing	Bentley Continental GT3 (2018)	S	1:34.090	+0.504
3	7	(Colombia) Óscar Tunjo (Finland) Juuso Puhakka	(Germany) Toksport	Mercedes-AMG GT3 Evo	S	1:34.108	+0.522
4	163	(Austria) Norbert Siedler (Spain) Albert Costa	(Switzerland) Emil Frey Racing	Lamborghini Huracán GT3 Evo	P	1:34.109	+0.523
5	87	(Russia) Konstantin Tereshchenko (France) Jim Pla	(France) AKKA ASP	Mercedes-AMG GT3 Evo	S	1:34.190	+0.604
6	108	(France) Nelson Panciatici (Monaco) Stéphane Richelmi	(France) Classic and Modern Racing	Bentley Continental GT3 (2018)	P	1:34.195	+0.609
7	88	(Russia) Timur Boguslavskiy (Italy) Raffaele Marciello	(France) AKKA ASP	Mercedes-AMG GT3 Evo	P	1:34.370	+0.784
8	31	(United Kingdom) Frank Bird (Japan) Ryuichiro Tomita	(Belgium) Team WRT	Audi R8 LMS Evo	S	1:34.370	+0.784
9	6	(Germany) Maro Engel (Germany) Luca Stolz	(Germany) Toksport	Mercedes-AMG GT3 Evo	P	1:34.492	+0.906
10	159	(Finland) Tuomas Tujula (Denmark) Nicolai Kjærgaard	(United Kingdom) Garage 59	Aston Martin Vantage AMR GT3	S	1:34.523	+0.937
11	26	(France) Aurélien Panis (Belgium) Frédéric Vervisch	(France) Saintéloc Racing	Audi R8 LMS Evo	P	1:34.600	+1.014
12	90	(Argentina) Ezequiel Pérez Companc (Netherlands) Rik Breukers	(Argentina) MadPanda Motorsport	Mercedes-AMG GT3 Evo	S	1:34.626	+1.040
13	66	(Germany) Christopher Mies (Germany) Jusuf Owega	(Germany) Attempto Racing	Audi R8 LMS Evo	P	1:34.830	+1.244
14	114	(United Kingdom) Jack Aitken (Finland) Konsta Lappalainen	(Switzerland) Emil Frey Racing	Lamborghini Huracán GT3 Evo	P	1:34.847	+1.261
15	32	(Belgium) Dries Vanthoor (Belgium) Charles Weerts	(Belgium) Team WRT	Audi R8 LMS Evo	P	1:34.919	+1.333
16	25	(Germany) Christopher Haase (France) Léo Roussel	(France) Saintéloc Racing	Audi R8 LMS Evo	P	1:35.055	+1.469
17	33	(Chile) Benjamín Hites (South Africa) David Perel	(Germany) Rinaldi Racing	Ferrari 488 GT3 Evo (2020)	S	1:35.086	+1.500
18	54	(Germany) Christian Engelhart (Belgium) Adrien de Leener	(Italy) Dinamic Motorsport	Porsche 911 GT3-R (991.II)	P	1:35.307	+1.721
19	99	(Italy) Tommaso Mosca (Italy) Mattia Drudi	(Germany) Attempto Racing	Audi R8 LMS Evo	P	1:35.461	+1.875
20	89	(France) Jules Gounon (Romania) Răzvan Umbrărescu	(France) AKKA ASP	Mercedes-AMG GT3 Evo	P	1:35.648	+2.062
21	93	(United Kingdom) Chris Froggatt (Italy) Giorgio Roda	(United Kingdom) Tempesta Racing	Ferrari 488 GT3 Evo (2020)	S	1:36.205	+2.619
22	30	(Germany) Markus Winkelhock (Denmark) Benjamin Goethe	(Belgium) Team WRT	Audi R8 LMS Evo	P	1:36.536	+2.950
23	55	(Germany) Dennis Marschall (Germany) Alex Aka	(Germany) Attempto Racing	Audi R8 LMS Evo	S	1:36.548	+2.962
24	77	(Portugal) Henrique Chaves (Portugal) Miguel Ramos	(United Kingdom) Barwell Motorsport	Lamborghini Huracán GT3 Evo	PA	1:36.600	+3.014
25	52	(Belgium) Louis Machiels (Italy) Andrea Bertolini	(Italy) AF Corse	Ferrari 488 GT3 Evo (2020)	PA	1:36.638	+3.052
26	20	(Germany) Valentin Pierburg (Austria) Dominik Baumann	(Germany) SPS Automotive Performance	Mercedes-AMG GT3 Evo	PA	1:37.703	+4.117
27	188	(United Kingdom) Jonathan Adam (Sweden) Alexander West	(United Kingdom) Garage 59	Aston Martin Vantage AMR GT3	PA	1:37.978	+4.392

==== Race ====
Pos.	No.	Driver	Team	Car	Class	Lap	Time/Retired	Points
1	14	(Switzerland) Ricardo Feller (Switzerland) Alex Fontana	(Switzerland) Emil Frey Racing	Lamborghini Huracán GT3 Evo	S	37	1:00:48.141	25
2	88	(Russia) Timur Boguslavskiy (Italy) Raffaele Marciello	(France) AKKA ASP	Mercedes-AMG GT3 Evo	P	37	+9.628	25
3	107	(France) Pierre-Alexandre Jean (Belgium) Ulysse de Pauw	(France) Classic and Modern Racing	Bentley Continental GT3 (2018)	S	37	+13.696	18
4	31	(United Kingdom) Frank Bird (Japan) Ryuichiro Tomita	(Belgium) Team WRT	Audi R8 LMS Evo	S	37	+22.754	15
5	7	(Colombia) Óscar Tunjo (Finland) Juuso Puhakka	(Germany) Toksport	Mercedes-AMG GT3 Evo	S	37	+27.463	12
6	87	(Russia) Konstantin Tereshchenko (France) Jim Pla	(France) AKKA ASP	Mercedes-AMG GT3 Evo	S	37	+31.688	10
7	6	(Germany) Maro Engel (Germany) Luca Stolz	(Germany) Toksport	Mercedes-AMG GT3 Evo	P	37	+32.394	18
8	32	(Belgium) Dries Vanthoor (Belgium) Charles Weerts	(Belgium) Team WRT	Audi R8 LMS Evo	P	37	+32.793	15
9	26	(France) Aurélien Panis (Belgium) Frédéric Vervisch	(France) Saintéloc Racing	Audi R8 LMS Evo	P	37	+33.827	12
10	66	(Germany) Christopher Mies (Germany) Jusuf Owega	(Germany) Attempto Racing	Audi R8 LMS Evo	P	37	+40.976	10
11	25	(Germany) Christopher Haase (France) Léo Roussel	(France) Saintéloc Racing	Audi R8 LMS Evo	P	37	+41.841	8
12	54	(Germany) Christian Engelhart (Belgium) Adrien de Leener	(Italy) Dinamic Motorsport	Porsche 911 GT3-R (991.II)	P	37	+42.071	6
13	89	(France) Jules Gounon (Romania) Răzvan Umbrărescu	(France) AKKA ASP	Mercedes-AMG GT3 Evo	P	37	+42.404	4
14	99	(Italy) Tommaso Mosca (Italy) Mattia Drudi	(Germany) Attempto Racing	Audi R8 LMS Evo	P	37	+56.977	2
15	114	(United Kingdom) Jack Aitken (Finland) Konsta Lappalainen	(Switzerland) Emil Frey Racing	Lamborghini Huracán GT3 Evo	P	37	+57.498	1
16	30	(Germany) Markus Winkelhock (Denmark) Benjamin Goethe	(Belgium) Team WRT	Audi R8 LMS Evo	P	37	+58.063	
17	55	(Germany) Dennis Marschall (Germany) Alex Aka	(Germany) Attempto Racing	Audi R8 LMS Evo	S	37	+1:05.119	8
18	77	(Portugal) Henrique Chaves (Portugal) Miguel Ramos	(United Kingdom) Barwell Motorsport	Lamborghini Huracán GT3 Evo	PA	37	+1:16.522	25
19	93	(United Kingdom) Chris Froggatt (Italy) Giorgio Roda	(United Kingdom) Tempesta Racing	Ferrari 488 GT3 Evo (2020)	S	37	+1:19.109	6
20	108	(France) Nelson Panciatici (Monaco) Stéphane Richelmi	(France) Classic and Modern Racing	Bentley Continental GT3 (2018)	P	37	+1:20.623	
21	52	(Belgium) Louis Machiels (Italy) Andrea Bertolini	(Italy) AF Corse	Ferrari 488 GT3 Evo (2020)	PA	37	+1:32.251	18
22	20	(Germany) Valentin Pierburg (Austria) Dominik Baumann	(Germany) SPS Automotive Performance	Mercedes-AMG GT3 Evo	PA	37	+1:33.067	15
23	188	(United Kingdom) Jonathan Adam (Sweden) Alexander West	(United Kingdom) Garage 59	Aston Martin Vantage AMR GT3	PA	36	+1 lap	12
DNF	159	(Finland) Tuomas Tujula (Denmark) Nicolai Kjærgaard	(United Kingdom) Garage 59	Aston Martin Vantage AMR GT3	S	27		
DNF	163	(Austria) Norbert Siedler (Spain) Albert Costa	(Switzerland) Emil Frey Racing	Lamborghini Huracán GT3 Evo	P	23		
DNF	33	(Chile) Benjamín Hites (South Africa) David Perel	(Germany) Rinaldi Racing	Ferrari 488 GT3 Evo (2020)	S	23		
DNF	90	(Argentina) Ezequiel Pérez Companc (Netherlands) Rik Breukers	(Argentina) MadPanda Motorsport	Mercedes-AMG GT3 Evo	S	19		

=== Race 2 ===
==== Qualifying ====
Pos.	No.	Driver	Team	Car	Class	Time	Gap
1	88	(Russia) Timur Boguslavskiy (Italy) Raffaele Marciello	(France) AKKA ASP	Mercedes-AMG GT3 Evo	P	1:34.304	
2	32	(Belgium) Dries Vanthoor (Belgium) Charles Weerts	(Belgium) Team WRT	Audi R8 LMS Evo	P	1:34.323	+0.019
3	54	(Germany) Christian Engelhart (Belgium) Adrien de Leener	(Italy) Dinamic Motorsport	Porsche 911 GT3-R (991.II)	P	1:34.439	+0.135
4	163	(Austria) Norbert Siedler (Spain) Albert Costa	(Switzerland) Emil Frey Racing	Lamborghini Huracán GT3 Evo	P	1:34.528	+0.224
5	107	(France) Pierre-Alexandre Jean (Belgium) Ulysse de Pauw	(France) Classic and Modern Racing	Bentley Continental GT3 (2018)	S	1:34.821	+0.517
6	6	(Germany) Maro Engel (Germany) Luca Stolz	(Germany) Toksport	Mercedes-AMG GT3 Evo	P	1:34.851	+0.547
7	114	(United Kingdom) Jack Aitken (Finland) Konsta Lappalainen	(Switzerland) Emil Frey Racing	Lamborghini Huracán GT3 Evo	P	1:34.881	+0.577
8	25	(Germany) Christopher Haase (France) Léo Roussel	(France) Saintéloc Racing	Audi R8 LMS Evo	P	1:34.887	+0.583
9	7	(Colombia) Óscar Tunjo (Finland) Juuso Puhakka	(Germany) Toksport	Mercedes-AMG GT3 Evo	S	1:34.908	+0.604
10	87	(Russia) Konstantin Tereshchenko (France) Jim Pla	(France) AKKA ASP	Mercedes-AMG GT3 Evo	S	1:34.966	+0.662
11	26	(France) Aurélien Panis (Belgium) Frédéric Vervisch	(France) Saintéloc Racing	Audi R8 LMS Evo	P	1:34.969	+0.665
12	33	(Chile) Benjamín Hites (South Africa) David Perel	(Germany) Rinaldi Racing	Ferrari 488 GT3 Evo (2020)	S	1:35.015	+0.711
13	77	(Portugal) Henrique Chaves (Portugal) Miguel Ramos	(United Kingdom) Barwell Motorsport	Lamborghini Huracán GT3 Evo	PA	1:35.093	+0.789
14	89	(France) Jules Gounon (Romania) Răzvan Umbrărescu	(France) AKKA ASP	Mercedes-AMG GT3 Evo	P	1:35.106	+0.802
15	99	(Italy) Tommaso Mosca (Italy) Mattia Drudi	(Germany) Attempto Racing	Audi R8 LMS Evo	P	1:35.274	+0.970
16	14	(Switzerland) Ricardo Feller (Switzerland) Alex Fontana	(Switzerland) Emil Frey Racing	Lamborghini Huracán GT3 Evo	S	1:35.314	+1.010
17	90	(Argentina) Ezequiel Pérez Companc (Netherlands) Rik Breukers	(Argentina) MadPanda Motorsport	Mercedes-AMG GT3 Evo	S	1:35.392	+1.088
18	188	(United Kingdom) Jonathan Adam (Sweden) Alexander West	(United Kingdom) Garage 59	Aston Martin Vantage AMR GT3	PA	1:35.595	+1.291
19	30	(Germany) Markus Winkelhock (Denmark) Benjamin Goethe	(Belgium) Team WRT	Audi R8 LMS Evo	P	1:35.630	+1.326
20	108	(France) Nelson Panciatici (Monaco) Stéphane Richelmi	(France) Classic and Modern Racing	Bentley Continental GT3 (2018)	P	1:35.761	+1.457
21	55	(Germany) Dennis Marschall (Germany) Alex Aka	(Germany) Attempto Racing	Audi R8 LMS Evo	S	1:35.776	+1.472
22	93	(United Kingdom) Chris Froggatt (Italy) Giorgio Roda	(United Kingdom) Tempesta Racing	Ferrari 488 GT3 Evo (2020)	S	1:35.823	+1.519
23	52	(Belgium) Louis Machiels (Italy) Andrea Bertolini	(Italy) AF Corse	Ferrari 488 GT3 Evo (2020)	PA	1:35.843	+1.539
24	159	(Finland) Tuomas Tujula (Denmark) Nicolai Kjærgaard	(United Kingdom) Garage 59	Aston Martin Vantage AMR GT3	S	1:35.871	+1.567
25	20	(Germany) Valentin Pierburg (Austria) Dominik Baumann	(Germany) SPS Automotive Performance	Mercedes-AMG GT3 Evo	PA	1:35.871	+1.567
26	31	(United Kingdom) Frank Bird (Japan) Ryuichiro Tomita	(Belgium) Team WRT	Audi R8 LMS Evo	S	1:36.086	+1.782
27	66	(Germany) Christopher Mies (Germany) Jusuf Owega	(Germany) Attempto Racing	Audi R8 LMS Evo	P	1:36.105	+1.801

==== Race ====
Pos.	No.	Driver	Team	Car	Class	Lap	Time/Retired	Points
1	163	(Austria) Norbert Siedler (Spain) Albert Costa	(Switzerland) Emil Frey Racing	Lamborghini Huracán GT3 Evo	P	37	1:00:34.660	25
2	14	(Switzerland) Ricardo Feller (Switzerland) Alex Fontana	(Switzerland) Emil Frey Racing	Lamborghini Huracán GT3 Evo	S	37	+10.954	25
3	32	(Belgium) Dries Vanthoor (Belgium) Charles Weerts	(Belgium) Team WRT	Audi R8 LMS Evo	P	37	+24.121	18
4	114	(United Kingdom) Jack Aitken (Finland) Konsta Lappalainen	(Switzerland) Emil Frey Racing	Lamborghini Huracán GT3 Evo	P	37	+28.799	15
5	107	(France) Pierre-Alexandre Jean (Belgium) Ulysse de Pauw	(France) Classic and Modern Racing	Bentley Continental GT3 (2018)	S	37	+29.358	18
6	89	(France) Jules Gounon (Romania) Răzvan Umbrărescu	(France) AKKA ASP	Mercedes-AMG GT3 Evo	P	37	+30.140	12
7	31	(United Kingdom) Frank Bird (Japan) Ryuichiro Tomita	(Belgium) Team WRT	Audi R8 LMS Evo	S	37	+32.114	15
8	33	(Chile) Benjamín Hites (South Africa) David Perel	(Germany) Rinaldi Racing	Ferrari 488 GT3 Evo (2020)	S	37	+33.927	12
9	90	(Argentina) Ezequiel Pérez Companc (Netherlands) Rik Breukers	(Argentina) MadPanda Motorsport	Mercedes-AMG GT3 Evo	S	37	+34.275	10
10	7	(Colombia) Óscar Tunjo (Finland) Juuso Puhakka	(Germany) Toksport	Mercedes-AMG GT3 Evo	S	37	+38.843	8
11	66	(Germany) Christopher Mies (Germany) Jusuf Owega	(Germany) Attempto Racing	Audi R8 LMS Evo	P	37	+47.320	10
12	55	(Germany) Dennis Marschall (Germany) Alex Aka	(Germany) Attempto Racing	Audi R8 LMS Evo	S	37	+51.548	6
13	159	(Finland) Tuomas Tujula (Denmark) Nicolai Kjærgaard	(United Kingdom) Garage 59	Aston Martin Vantage AMR GT3	S	37	+52.550	4
14	108	(France) Nelson Panciatici (Monaco) Stéphane Richelmi	(France) Classic and Modern Racing	Bentley Continental GT3 (2018)	P	37	+56.876	8
15	26	(France) Aurélien Panis (Belgium) Frédéric Vervisch	(France) Saintéloc Racing	Audi R8 LMS Evo	P	37	+58.152	6
16	25	(Germany) Christopher Haase (France) Léo Roussel	(France) Saintéloc Racing	Audi R8 LMS Evo	P	37	+1:08.609	4
17	99	(Italy) Tommaso Mosca (Italy) Mattia Drudi	(Germany) Attempto Racing	Audi R8 LMS Evo	P	37	+1:11.159	2
18	30	(Germany) Markus Winkelhock (Denmark) Benjamin Goethe	(Belgium) Team WRT	Audi R8 LMS Evo	P	37	+1:13.617	1
19	87	(Russia) Konstantin Tereshchenko (France) Jim Pla	(France) AKKA ASP	Mercedes-AMG GT3 Evo	S	37	+1:19.848	2
20	20	(Germany) Valentin Pierburg (Austria) Dominik Baumann	(Germany) SPS Automotive Performance	Mercedes-AMG GT3 Evo	PA	37	+1:30.040	25
21	188	(United Kingdom) Jonathan Adam (Sweden) Alexander West	(United Kingdom) Garage 59	Aston Martin Vantage AMR GT3	PA	37	+1:41.607	18
22	52	(Belgium) Louis Machiels (Italy) Andrea Bertolini	(Italy) AF Corse	Ferrari 488 GT3 Evo (2020)	PA	36	+1 lap	15
23	93	(United Kingdom) Chris Froggatt (Italy) Giorgio Roda	(United Kingdom) Tempesta Racing	Ferrari 488 GT3 Evo (2020)	S	35	+2 laps	1
DNF	54	(Germany) Christian Engelhart (Belgium) Adrien de Leener	(Italy) Dinamic Motorsport	Porsche 911 GT3-R (991.II)	P	27		
DNF	88	(Russia) Timur Boguslavskiy (Italy) Raffaele Marciello	(France) AKKA ASP	Mercedes-AMG GT3 Evo	P	25		
DNF	6	(Germany) Maro Engel (Germany) Luca Stolz	(Germany) Toksport	Mercedes-AMG GT3 Evo	P	15		
DNS	77	(Portugal) Henrique Chaves (Portugal) Miguel Ramos	(United Kingdom) Barwell Motorsport	Lamborghini Huracán GT3 Evo	PA	0		

Previous race: 2021 GT World Challenge Europe Sprint Cup Magny-Cours round	GT World Challenge Europe Sprint Cup; 2021 season	Next race: 2021 GT World Challenge Europe Sprint Cup Misano round
