= 2021 GT World Challenge Europe Sprint Cup Magny-Cours round =

Motor racing event

(France) 2021 GT World Challenge Europe Sprint Cup Magny-Cours round
Event Information
- Round 1 of 5 in the 2021 GT World Challenge Europe Sprint Cup
- Date: 7–9 May 2021 GT World Challenge Europe Sprint Cup
- Location: Magny-Cours, Bourgogne-Franche-Comté, France
- Venue: Circuit de Nevers Magny-Cours

Results
Race 1
Distance	36 laps	158.832 km
Pole position	(Belgium) Dries Vanthoor (Belgium) Charles Weerts; Team WRT	1:36.133
Winner	(Belgium) Dries Vanthoor (Belgium) Charles Weerts; Team WRT	1:00:53.014
Race 2
Distance	33 laps	145.596 km
Pole position	(Germany) Maro Engel (Germany) Luca Stolz; Toksport	1:35.627
Winner	(Germany) Maro Engel (Germany) Luca Stolz; Toksport	1:01:30.308

The 2021 GT World Challenge Europe Sprint Cup Magny-Cours round was a motor racing event for the GT World Challenge Europe Sprint Cup, held on the weekend of 7 to 9 May 2021. The event was held on the Circuit de Nevers Magny-Cours in Magny-Cours, Bourgogne-Franche-Comté, France and consisted of two races, both one hour in length. It was the first event in the 2021 GT World Challenge Europe Sprint Cup and hosted Races 1 and 2 of the season.

== Results ==
=== Race 1 ===
==== Qualifying ====
Pos.	No.	Driver	Team	Car	Class	Time	Gap
1	32	(Belgium) Dries Vanthoor (Belgium) Charles Weerts	(Belgium) Team WRT	Audi R8 LMS Evo	P	1:36.133	
2	163	(Switzerland) Ricardo Feller (Spain) Albert Costa	(Switzerland) Emil Frey Racing	Lamborghini Huracán GT3 Evo	P	1:36.238	+0.105
3	14	(France) Arthur Rougier (Switzerland) Alex Fontana	(Switzerland) Emil Frey Racing	Lamborghini Huracán GT3 Evo	S	1:36.270	+0.137
4	33	(Finland) Patrick Kujala (Chile) Benjamín Hites	(Germany) Rinaldi Racing	Ferrari 488 GT3 Evo 2020	S	1:36.335	+0.202
5	90	(Argentina) Ezequiel Pérez Companc (Netherlands) Rik Breukers	(Argentina) MadPanda Motorsport	Mercedes-AMG GT3 Evo	S	1:36.368	+0.235
6	6	(Germany) Maro Engel (Germany) Luca Stolz	(Germany) Toksport	Mercedes-AMG GT3 Evo	P	1:36.468	+0.335
7	7	(Colombia) Óscar Tunjo (Finland) Juuso Puhakka	(Germany) Toksport	Mercedes-AMG GT3 Evo	S	1:36.506	+0.373
8	88	(Russia) Timur Boguslavskiy (Italy) Raffaele Marciello	(France) AKKA ASP	Mercedes-AMG GT3 Evo	P	1:36.554	+0.421
9	31	(United Kingdom) Frank Bird (Japan) Ryuichiro Tomita	(Belgium) Team WRT	Audi R8 LMS Evo	S	1:36.595	+0.462
10	99	(Italy) Tommaso Mosca (Italy) Mattia Drudi	(Germany) Attempto Racing	Audi R8 LMS Evo	P	1:36.627	+0.494
11	93	(United Kingdom) Chris Froggatt (Italy) Giorgio Roda	(United Kingdom) Tempesta Racing	Ferrari 488 GT3 Evo 2020	S	1:36.693	+0.560
12	25	(France) Léo Roussel (Germany) Christopher Haase	(France) Saintéloc Racing	Audi R8 LMS Evo	P	1:36.717	+0.584
13	89	(Romania) Răzvan Umbrărescu (France) Jules Gounon	(France) AKKA ASP	Mercedes-AMG GT3 Evo	P	1:36.767	+0.634
14	159	(Finland) Tuomas Tujula (Denmark) Nicolai Kjærgaard	(United Kingdom) Garage 59	Aston Martin Vantage AMR GT3	S	1:36.776	+0.643
15	26	(France) Aurélien Panis (Belgium) Frédéric Vervisch	(France) Saintéloc Racing	Audi R8 LMS Evo	P	1:36.832	+0.699
16	107	(Belgium) Ulysse de Pauw (France) Pierre-Alexandre Jean	(France) Classic and Modern Racing	Bentley Continental GT3 (2018)	S	1:36.965	+0.832
17	87	(Russia) Konstantin Tereshchenko (France) Jim Pla	(France) AKKA ASP	Mercedes-AMG GT3 Evo	S	1:37.067	+0.934
18	108	(Belgium) Benjamin Lessennes (Monaco) Stéphane Richelmi	(France) Classic and Modern Racing	Bentley Continental GT3 (2018)	P	1:37.076	+0.943
19	30	(Denmark) Benjamin Goethe (South Africa) Kelvin van der Linde	(Belgium) Team WRT	Audi R8 LMS Evo	P	1:37.173	+1.040
20	66	(Germany) Alex Aka (Germany) Christopher Mies	(Germany) Attempto Racing	Audi R8 LMS Evo	P	1:37.240	+1.107
21	114	(Finland) Konsta Lappalainen (United Kingdom) Jack Aitken	(Switzerland) Emil Frey Racing	Lamborghini Huracán GT3 Evo	P	1:37.364	+1.231
22	38	(United Kingdom) Ben Barnicoat (United Kingdom) Oliver Wilkinson	(United Kingdom) Jota Sport	McLaren 720S GT3	P	1:37.457	+1.324
23	54	(Belgium) Adrien de Leener (Germany) Christian Engelhart	(Italy) Dinamic Motorsport	Porsche 911 GT3-R (991.II)	P	1:37.495	+1.362
24	188	(Sweden) Alexander West (United Kingdom) Jonathan Adam	(United Kingdom) Garage 59	Aston Martin Vantage AMR GT3	PA	1:38.068	+1.935
25	77	(Portugal) Henrique Chaves (Portugal) Miguel Ramos	(United Kingdom) Barwell Motorsport	Lamborghini Huracán GT3 Evo	PA	1:38.096	+1.963
26	20	(Germany) Valentin Pierburg (Austria) Dominik Baumann	(Germany) SPS Automotive Performance	Mercedes-AMG GT3 Evo	PA	1:38.250	+2.117
27	52	(Belgium) Louis Machiels (Italy) Andrea Bertolini	(Italy) AF Corse	Ferrari 488 GT3 Evo 2020	PA	1:38.805	+2.672

==== Race ====
Pos.	No.	Driver	Team	Car	Class	Lap	Time/Retired	Points
1	32	(Belgium) Dries Vanthoor (Belgium) Charles Weerts	(Belgium) Team WRT	Audi R8 LMS Evo	P	36	1:00:53.014	25
2	163	(Switzerland) Ricardo Feller (Spain) Albert Costa	(Switzerland) Emil Frey Racing	Lamborghini Huracán GT3 Evo	P	36	+6.468	18
3	14	(France) Arthur Rougier (Switzerland) Alex Fontana	(Switzerland) Emil Frey Racing	Lamborghini Huracán GT3 Evo	S	36	+19.229	25
4	90	(Argentina) Ezequiel Pérez Companc (Netherlands) Rik Breukers	(Argentina) MadPanda Motorsport	Mercedes-AMG GT3 Evo	S	36	+28.157	18
5	88	(Russia) Timur Boguslavskiy (Italy) Raffaele Marciello	(France) AKKA ASP	Mercedes-AMG GT3 Evo	P	36	+29.905	15
6	99	(Italy) Tommaso Mosca (Italy) Mattia Drudi	(Germany) Attempto Racing	Audi R8 LMS Evo	P	36	+33.960	12
7	7	(Colombia) Óscar Tunjo (Finland) Juuso Puhakka	(Germany) Toksport	Mercedes-AMG GT3 Evo	S	36	+38.780	15
8	33	(Finland) Patrick Kujala (Chile) Benjamín Hites	(Germany) Rinaldi Racing	Ferrari 488 GT3 Evo 2020	S	36	+40.232	12
9	107	(Belgium) Ulysse de Pauw (France) Pierre-Alexandre Jean	(France) Classic and Modern Racing	Bentley Continental GT3 (2018)	S	36	+40.988	10
10	89	(Romania) Răzvan Umbrărescu (France) Jules Gounon	(France) AKKA ASP	Mercedes-AMG GT3 Evo	P	36	+41.404	10
11	30	(Denmark) Benjamin Goethe (South Africa) Kelvin van der Linde	(Belgium) Team WRT	Audi R8 LMS Evo	P	36	+42.864	8
12	114	(Finland) Konsta Lappalainen (United Kingdom) Jack Aitken	(Switzerland) Emil Frey Racing	Lamborghini Huracán GT3 Evo	P	36	+59.412	6
13	108	(Belgium) Benjamin Lessennes (Monaco) Stéphane Richelmi	(France) Classic and Modern Racing	Bentley Continental GT3 (2018)	P	36	+1:10.660	4
14	159	(Finland) Tuomas Tujula (Denmark) Nicolai Kjærgaard	(United Kingdom) Garage 59	Aston Martin Vantage AMR GT3	S	36	+1:11.923	8
15	54	(Belgium) Adrien de Leener (Germany) Christian Engelhart	(Italy) Dinamic Motorsport	Porsche 911 GT3-R (991.II)	P	36	+1:12.884	2
16	87	(Russia) Konstantin Tereshchenko (France) Jim Pla	(France) AKKA ASP	Mercedes-AMG GT3 Evo	S	36	+1:13.297	6
17	38	(United Kingdom) Ben Barnicoat (United Kingdom) Oliver Wilkinson	(United Kingdom) Jota Sport	McLaren 720S GT3	P	36	+1:22.861	1
18	52	(Belgium) Louis Machiels (Italy) Andrea Bertolini	(Italy) AF Corse	Ferrari 488 GT3 Evo 2020	PA	36	+1:29.033	25
19	66	(Germany) Alex Aka (Germany) Christopher Mies	(Germany) Attempto Racing	Audi R8 LMS Evo	P	36	+1:29.556	
20	93	(United Kingdom) Chris Froggatt (Italy) Giorgio Roda	(United Kingdom) Tempesta Racing	Ferrari 488 GT3 Evo 2020	S	36	+1:33.686	4
21	20	(Germany) Valentin Pierburg (Austria) Dominik Baumann	(Germany) SPS Automotive Performance	Mercedes-AMG GT3 Evo	PA	36	+1:35.104	18
22	188	(Sweden) Alexander West (United Kingdom) Jonathan Adam	(United Kingdom) Garage 59	Aston Martin Vantage AMR GT3	PA	35	+1 lap	15
23	77	(Portugal) Henrique Chaves (Portugal) Miguel Ramos	(United Kingdom) Barwell Motorsport	Lamborghini Huracán GT3 Evo	PA	35	+1 lap	12
24	31	(United Kingdom) Frank Bird (Japan) Ryuichiro Tomita	(Belgium) Team WRT	Audi R8 LMS Evo	S	34	+2 laps	2
DNF	6	(Germany) Maro Engel (Germany) Luca Stolz	(Germany) Toksport	Mercedes-AMG GT3 Evo	P	29	Mechanical	
DNF	26	(France) Aurélien Panis (Belgium) Frédéric Vervisch	(France) Saintéloc Racing	Audi R8 LMS Evo	P	25	Mechanical	
DNF	25	(France) Léo Roussel (Germany) Christopher Haase	(France) Saintéloc Racing	Audi R8 LMS Evo	P	12	Spun out	

=== Race 2 ===
==== Qualifying ====
Pos.	No.	Driver	Team	Car	Class	Time	Gap
1	6	(Germany) Maro Engel (Germany) Luca Stolz	(Germany) Toksport	Mercedes-AMG GT3 Evo	P	1:35.627	
2	163	(Switzerland) Ricardo Feller (Spain) Albert Costa	(Switzerland) Emil Frey Racing	Lamborghini Huracán GT3 Evo	P	1:35.880	+0.253
3	38	(United Kingdom) Ben Barnicoat (United Kingdom) Oliver Wilkinson	(United Kingdom) Jota Sport	McLaren 720S GT3	P	1:35.894	+0.267
4	32	(Belgium) Dries Vanthoor (Belgium) Charles Weerts	(Belgium) Team WRT	Audi R8 LMS Evo	P	1:35.985	+0.358
5	14	(France) Arthur Rougier (Switzerland) Alex Fontana	(Switzerland) Emil Frey Racing	Lamborghini Huracán GT3 Evo	S	1:36.008	+0.381
6	88	(Russia) Timur Boguslavskiy (Italy) Raffaele Marciello	(France) AKKA ASP	Mercedes-AMG GT3 Evo	P	1:36.026	+0.399
7	107	(Belgium) Ulysse de Pauw (France) Pierre-Alexandre Jean	(France) Classic and Modern Racing	Bentley Continental GT3 (2018)	S	1:36.224	+0.597
8	89	(Romania) Răzvan Umbrărescu (France) Jules Gounon	(France) AKKA ASP	Mercedes-AMG GT3 Evo	P	1:36.259	+0.632
9	114	(Finland) Konsta Lappalainen (United Kingdom) Jack Aitken	(Switzerland) Emil Frey Racing	Lamborghini Huracán GT3 Evo	P	1:36.313	+0.686
10	26	(France) Aurélien Panis (Belgium) Frédéric Vervisch	(France) Saintéloc Racing	Audi R8 LMS Evo	P	1:36.333	+0.706
11	25	(France) Léo Roussel (Germany) Christopher Haase	(France) Saintéloc Racing	Audi R8 LMS Evo	P	1:36.336	+0.709
12	188	(Sweden) Alexander West (United Kingdom) Jonathan Adam	(United Kingdom) Garage 59	Aston Martin Vantage AMR GT3	PA	1:36.405	+0.778
13	7	(Colombia) Óscar Tunjo (Finland) Juuso Puhakka	(Germany) Toksport	Mercedes-AMG GT3 Evo	S	1:36.439	+0.812
14	87	(Russia) Konstantin Tereshchenko (France) Jim Pla	(France) AKKA ASP	Mercedes-AMG GT3 Evo	S	1:36.496	+0.869
15	90	(Argentina) Ezequiel Pérez Companc (Netherlands) Rik Breukers	(Argentina) MadPanda Motorsport	Mercedes-AMG GT3 Evo	S	1:36.502	+0.875
16	99	(Italy) Tommaso Mosca (Italy) Mattia Drudi	(Germany) Attempto Racing	Audi R8 LMS Evo	P	1:36.571	+0.944
17	31	(United Kingdom) Frank Bird (Japan) Ryuichiro Tomita	(Belgium) Team WRT	Audi R8 LMS Evo	S	1:36.604	+0.977
18	30	(Denmark) Benjamin Goethe (South Africa) Kelvin van der Linde	(Belgium) Team WRT	Audi R8 LMS Evo	P	1:36.645	+1.018
19	54	(Belgium) Adrien de Leener (Germany) Christian Engelhart	(Italy) Dinamic Motorsport	Porsche 911 GT3-R (991.II)	P	1:36.699	+1.072
20	20	(Germany) Valentin Pierburg (Austria) Dominik Baumann	(Germany) SPS Automotive Performance	Mercedes-AMG GT3 Evo	PA	1:36.830	+1.203
21	52	(Belgium) Louis Machiels (Italy) Andrea Bertolini	(Italy) AF Corse	Ferrari 488 GT3 Evo 2020	PA	1:36.837	+1.210
22	159	(Finland) Tuomas Tujula (Denmark) Nicolai Kjærgaard	(United Kingdom) Garage 59	Aston Martin Vantage AMR GT3	S	1:36.890	+1.263
23	77	(Portugal) Henrique Chaves (Portugal) Miguel Ramos	(United Kingdom) Barwell Motorsport	Lamborghini Huracán GT3 Evo	PA	1:36.935	+1.308
24	108	(Belgium) Benjamin Lessennes (Monaco) Stéphane Richelmi	(France) Classic and Modern Racing	Bentley Continental GT3 (2018)	P	1:37.216	+1.589
25	66	(Germany) Alex Aka (Germany) Christopher Mies	(Germany) Attempto Racing	Audi R8 LMS Evo	P	1:37.229	+1.602
26	33	(Finland) Patrick Kujala (Chile) Benjamín Hites	(Germany) Rinaldi Racing	Ferrari 488 GT3 Evo 2020	S	1:37.274	+1.647
27	93	(United Kingdom) Chris Froggatt (Italy) Giorgio Roda	(United Kingdom) Tempesta Racing	Ferrari 488 GT3 Evo 2020	S	1:37.530	+1.903

==== Race ====
Pos.	No.	Driver	Team	Car	Class	Laps	Time/Retired	Points
1	6	(Germany) Maro Engel (Germany) Luca Stolz	(Germany) Toksport	Mercedes-AMG GT3 Evo	P	33	1:01:30.308	25
2	32	(Belgium) Dries Vanthoor (Belgium) Charles Weerts	(Belgium) Team WRT	Audi R8 LMS Evo	P	33	+3.051	18
3	88	(Russia) Timur Boguslavskiy (Italy) Raffaele Marciello	(France) AKKA ASP	Mercedes-AMG GT3 Evo	P	33	+4.490	15
4	38	(United Kingdom) Ben Barnicoat (United Kingdom) Oliver Wilkinson	(United Kingdom) Jota Sport	McLaren 720S GT3	P	33	+5.267	12
5	87	(Russia) Konstantin Tereshchenko (France) Jim Pla	(France) AKKA ASP	Mercedes-AMG GT3 Evo	S	33	+5.465	25
6	26	(France) Aurélien Panis (Belgium) Frédéric Vervisch	(France) Saintéloc Racing	Audi R8 LMS Evo	P	33	+5.793	10
7	107	(Belgium) Ulysse de Pauw (France) Pierre-Alexandre Jean	(France) Classic and Modern Racing	Bentley Continental GT3 (2018)	S	33	+6.166	18
8	14	(France) Arthur Rougier (Switzerland) Alex Fontana	(Switzerland) Emil Frey Racing	Lamborghini Huracán GT3 Evo	S	33	+6.556	15
9	114	(Finland) Konsta Lappalainen (United Kingdom) Jack Aitken	(Switzerland) Emil Frey Racing	Lamborghini Huracán GT3 Evo	P	33	+7.270	8
10	31	(United Kingdom) Frank Bird (Japan) Ryuichiro Tomita	(Belgium) Team WRT	Audi R8 LMS Evo	S	33	+7.763	12
11	25	(France) Léo Roussel (Germany) Christopher Haase	(France) Saintéloc Racing	Audi R8 LMS Evo	P	33	+7.766	6
12	99	(Italy) Tommaso Mosca (Italy) Mattia Drudi	(Germany) Attempto Racing	Audi R8 LMS Evo	P	33	+8.202	4
13	90	(Argentina) Ezequiel Pérez Companc (Netherlands) Rik Breukers	(Argentina) MadPanda Motorsport	Mercedes-AMG GT3 Evo	S	33	+8.545	10
14	93	(United Kingdom) Chris Froggatt (Italy) Giorgio Roda	(United Kingdom) Tempesta Racing	Ferrari 488 GT3 Evo 2020	S	33	+9.213	8
15	108	(Belgium) Benjamin Lessennes (Monaco) Stéphane Richelmi	(France) Classic and Modern Racing	Bentley Continental GT3 (2018)	P	33	+9.605	2
16	77	(Portugal) Henrique Chaves (Portugal) Miguel Ramos	(United Kingdom) Barwell Motorsport	Lamborghini Huracán GT3 Evo	PA	33	+13.654	25
17	20	(Germany) Valentin Pierburg (Austria) Dominik Baumann	(Germany) SPS Automotive Performance	Mercedes-AMG GT3 Evo	PA	33	+14.024	18
18	66	(Germany) Alex Aka (Germany) Christopher Mies	(Germany) Attempto Racing	Audi R8 LMS Evo	P	33	+14.199	1
19	52	(Belgium) Louis Machiels (Italy) Andrea Bertolini	(Italy) AF Corse	Ferrari 488 GT3 Evo 2020	PA	33	+14.645	15
20	54	(Belgium) Adrien de Leener (Germany) Christian Engelhart	(Italy) Dinamic Motorsport	Porsche 911 GT3-R (991.II)	P	33	+14.894	
21	188	(Sweden) Alexander West (United Kingdom) Jonathan Adam	(United Kingdom) Garage 59	Aston Martin Vantage AMR GT3	PA	33	+21.328	12
22	33	(Finland) Patrick Kujala (Chile) Benjamín Hites	(Germany) Rinaldi Racing	Ferrari 488 GT3 Evo 2020	S	33	+41.626	6
DNF	7	(Colombia) Óscar Tunjo (Finland) Juuso Puhakka	(Germany) Toksport	Mercedes-AMG GT3 Evo	S	30	Mechanical	
DNF	89	(Romania) Răzvan Umbrărescu (France) Jules Gounon	(France) AKKA ASP	Mercedes-AMG GT3 Evo	P	26	Crash damage	
DNF	159	(Finland) Tuomas Tujula (Denmark) Nicolai Kjærgaard	(United Kingdom) Garage 59	Aston Martin Vantage AMR GT3	S	26	Crash	
DNF	163	(Switzerland) Ricardo Feller (Spain) Albert Costa	(Switzerland) Emil Frey Racing	Lamborghini Huracán GT3 Evo	P	23	Mechanical	
DNF	30	(Denmark) Benjamin Goethe (South Africa) Kelvin van der Linde	(Belgium) Team WRT	Audi R8 LMS Evo	P	20	Crash	

Previous race: 2020 GT World Challenge Europe Sprint Cup Barcelona round	GT World Challenge Europe Sprint Cup; 2021 season	Next race: 2021 GT World Challenge Europe Sprint Cup Zandvoort round
