= Henrique Chaves =

Portuguese racing driver

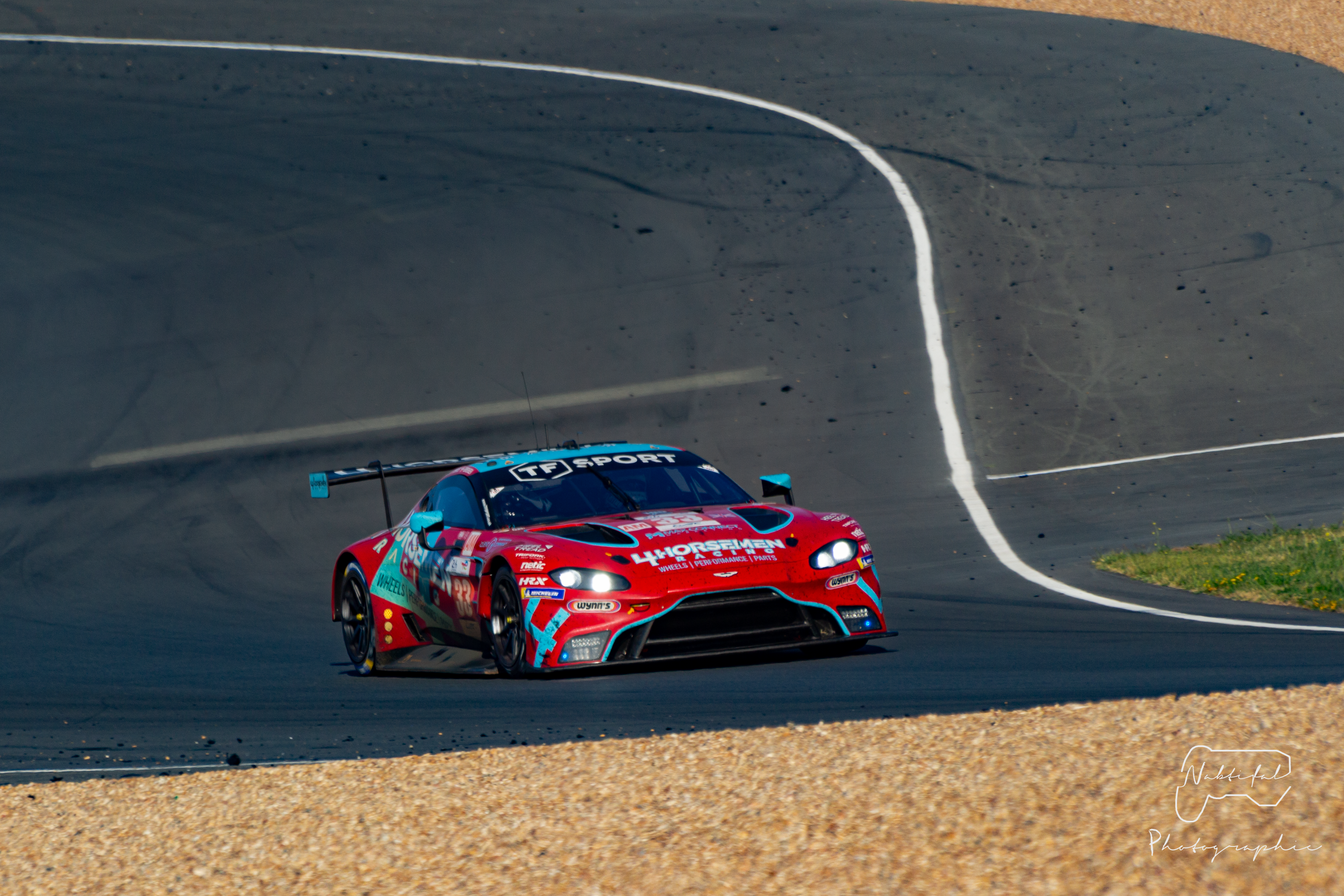
- Chaves at Le Mans in 2022
- Nationality: (Portugal) Portuguese
- Born: Henrique Chaves Jr. 21 March 1997 (age 29) Torres Vedras, Lisbon

International GT Open career
- Debut season: 2019
- Current team: Teo Martín Motorsport
- Categorisation: FIA Silver (until 2022); FIA Gold (2023); FIA Platinum (2024–)
- Car number: 59
- Starts: 26
- Wins: 3
- Poles: 1
- Fastest laps: 8
- Best finish: 1st in 2020

Previous series
- 2018 2017 2015-15 2015-17: European Le Mans Series; World Series Formula V8 3.5; Eurocup Formula Renault 2.0; Formula Renault 2.0 NEC

Championship titles
- 2012 2013 2021 2020: Spanish Karting Championship (X30 Senior); GT World Challenge Europe Sprint Pro-Am Cup; International GT Open

Henrique Chaves Jr. (born 21 March 1997) is a Portuguese racing driver.

== Career ==
=== Karting ===
Born in Torres Vedras, Chaves entered karting in 2006, when he took the title in the Portuguese Championship and Portuguese Cup in the Cadets Class. Chaves raced in karting until the 2015, collecting further titles in the Rotax Mini Class, Kf3, X30 and X30 Shifter classes of the Portuguese Championship, double title in the X30 class of the Spanish Championship, while his most notable karting achievement was the second place in the KZ2 category of the Spanish championship as well as the second place in the Iame X30 Finals in 2015.

=== Formula Renault ===
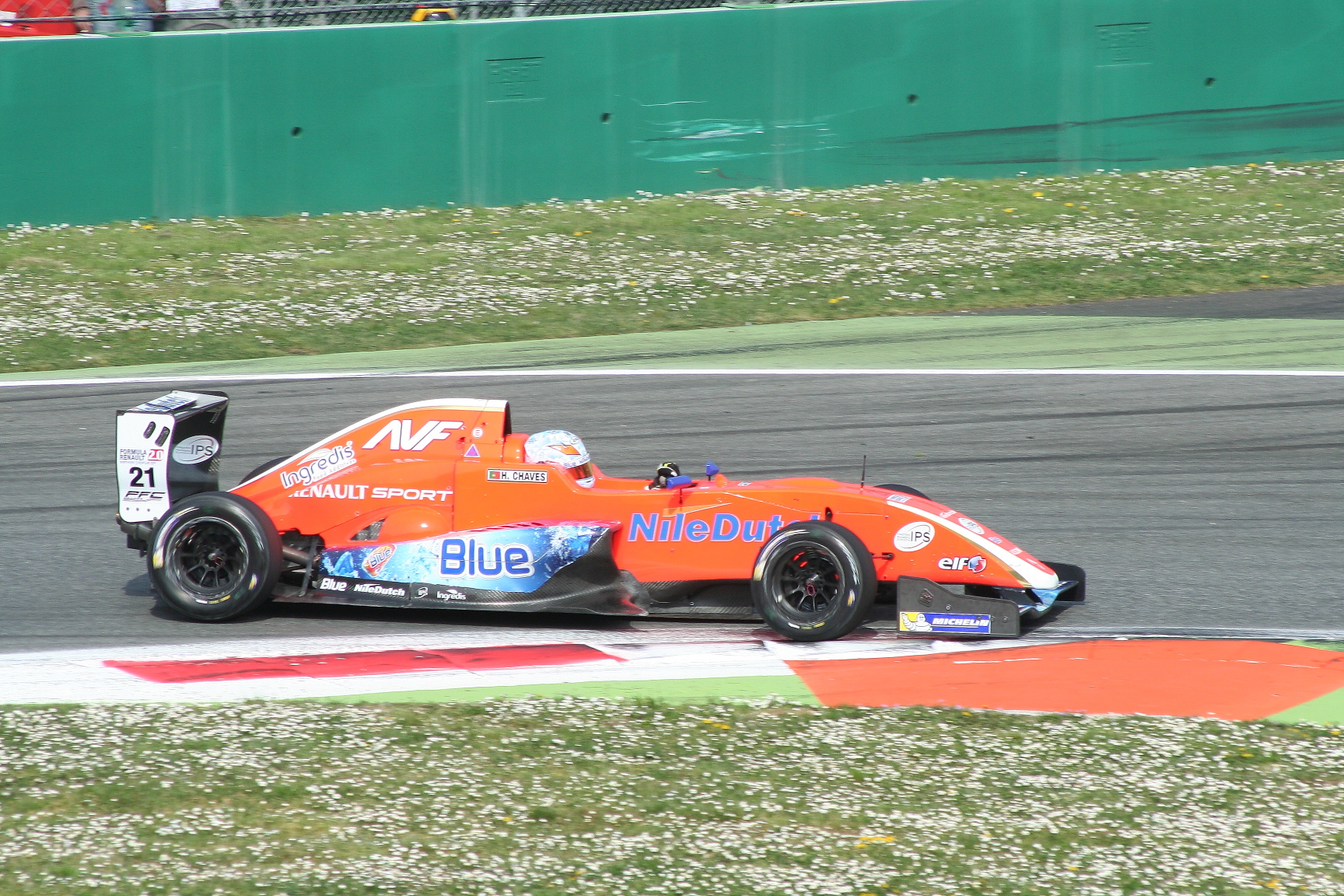
Chaves driving at Monza during the 2015 Formula Renault 2.0 NEC.

Chaves made his single seaters debut on the 2-litre Formula Renault machinery, competing in the Formula Renault 2.0 Northern European Cup full-time with AVF. He had twelve point-scoring finishes, while his highest-finishing position was the final race of the season at Hockenheim, where he finished fifth. He had a thirteenth place in the championship. He also has competed in the three round of the 2015 Eurocup Formula Renault 2.0.

Chaves stayed for another season with AVF for double full-time campaign in both Eurocup and NEC. He had seven point-scoring finishes in Eurocup and finished the season eleventh. While in the NEC, he failed to improve his championship position, having just one finish in the top-five in the first race at Spa.

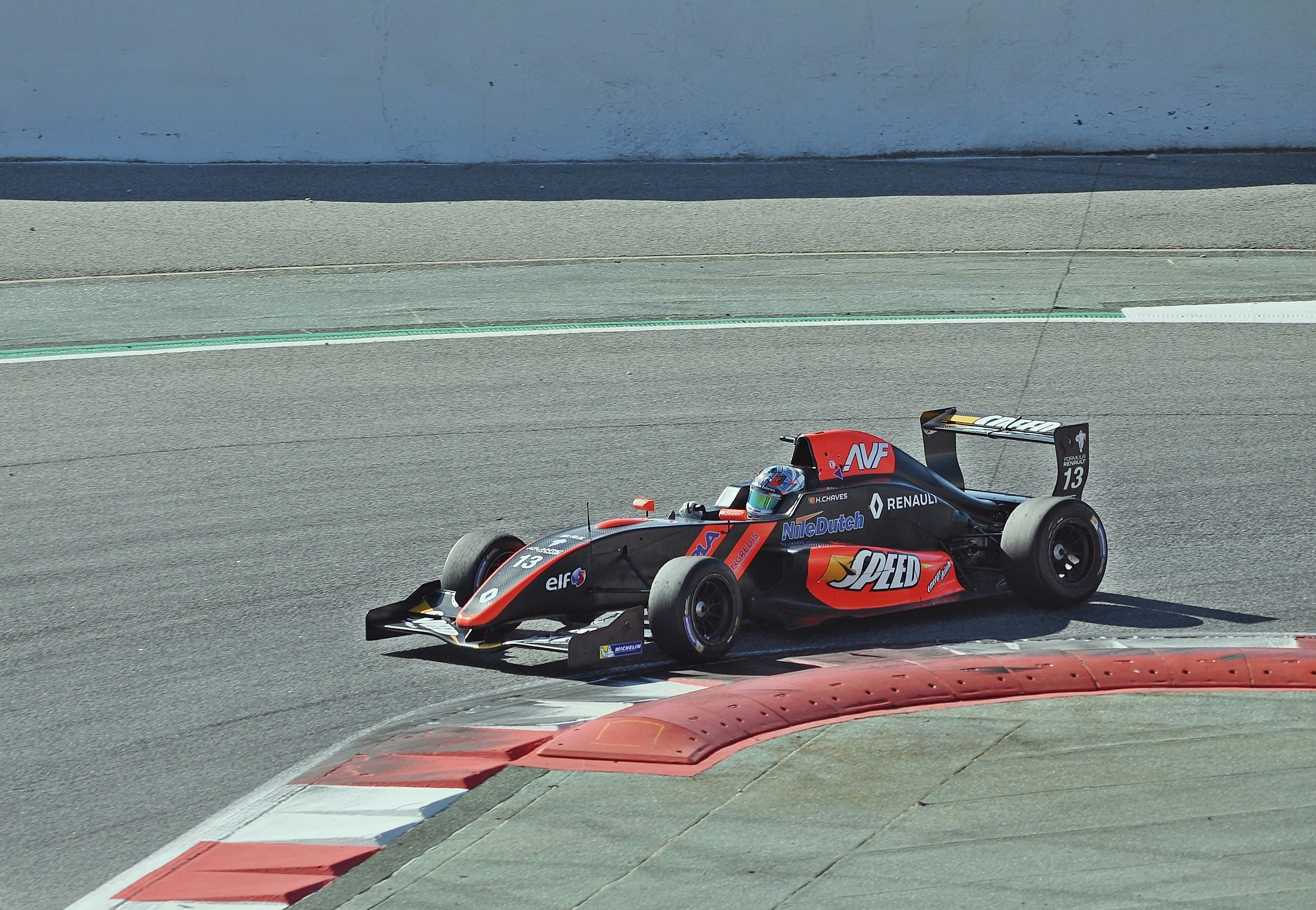
Chaves competing at Barcelona during the 2017 Formula Renault Eurocup finale.

In 2017, Chaves concentrated on Eurocup, continuing with AVF. He managed to score his first podium in the Formula Renault category, when he finished second in the first race at Silverstone. However, he wasn't able to keep the momentum, and after a couple of difficult races in Monaco and Pau he went on to score eight more point-scoring finishes, which led him to the twelfth place in the drivers' standings.

=== World Series Formula V8 3.5 ===
Chaves expanded his collaboration with AVF into the World Series Formula V8 3.5, joining them for the finale at Bahrain International Circuit. He won his debut race, starting from the front row of the grid. He was the seventh driver to achieve a debut win in this series since it started in 1998. In the second race of the weekend he again started from the front row, however this time he got collected by Alfonso Celis Jr. who dived from far beck on his inside, costing Chaves another highly probable podium result.

=== European Le Mans Series ===
Chaves decided to switch to sports car racing, joining the LMP2 class with AVF in the 2018 European Le Mans Series. On his first season in this championship, Chaves showed good race craft and maturity for someone his age, although the results don't demonstrate his true performance on track. Chaves started the season by setting the fastest overall lap during the European Le Mans Series Prologue. He went on to put his LMP2 car in the podium positions for the first half of the race in Monza before the team withdraw with electrical issues. He continued to show his pace in Silverstone with a comeback from tenth on the grid to second place over a triple stint effort and in Portimão he was able to pass the car over in third place, just before his teammate run into LMP3 cars and forced the team to withdraw the car with irreparable damage.

=== International GT Open ===
2019 saw Chaves make the switch into GT racing. He switched to Teo Martín Motorsport, another Spanish team that has been racing GT3 machinery for several years. Chaves teamed up with the Croatian Martin Kodrić in the debutant McLaren 720S GT3 for the season. Chaves started the season well with a second place in Paul Ricard on his first ever race with GT3 cars. The season continued and he managed to score five more podiums, two fastest laps and a win at the season finale where the car number 59 still was in contention for the title. They end up finishing third place overall tied with the second, while registering the best championship result of any McLaren 720s GT3 worldwide in the year 2019.

The partnership with Teo Martin Motorsport carried on while Miguel Ramos joined Chaves in an attempt for the overall championship win in 2020. Chaves left no doubt about his capabilities in 2020 and clinched the title after a dramatic season finale where their most direct competitor has thrown the McLaren number 59 off track, leaving the car stranded on the gravel on the last lap of the last race of the championship. He won two times, stood on the podium six times and was seven times the fastest on track. Once again his car was the best representative of all the McLaren GT3 cars racing around the world by winning the International GT Open Title.

== Racing record ==
=== Career summary ===
Season	Series	Team	Races	Wins	Poles	FLaps	Podiums	Points	Position
2015	Formula Renault 2.0 NEC	AVF	16	0	0	0	0	101	13th
2015	Eurocup Formula Renault 2.0	AVF	7	0	0	0	0	N/A	NC†
2016	Eurocup Formula Renault 2.0	AVF by Adrián Vallés	16	0	0	0	0	39	11th
2016	Formula Renault 2.0 NEC	AVF by Adrián Vallés	14	0	0	0	0	106	15th
2017	Formula Renault Eurocup	AVF	23	0	0	0	1	53	12th
2017	Formula Renault NEC	AVF	3	0	0	0	0	N/A	NC†
2017	World Series Formula V8 3.5	AVF	2	1	0	1	1	35	13th
2018	European Le Mans Series - LMP2	AVF by Adrián Vallés	6	0	0	0	0	6	23rd
2019	International GT Open	Teo Martín Motorsport	14	1	0	2	6	116	**3rd**
2019	FIA Motorsport Games GT Cup	Team Portugal	1	0	0	0	0	N/A	10th
2020	International GT Open	Teo Martín Motorsport	12	2	1	6	6	114	**1st**
2021	GT World Challenge Europe Sprint Cup	Barwell Motorsport	9	0	0	0	0	0	NC
2021	GT World Challenge Europe Sprint Cup - Pro-Am	Barwell Motorsport	9	5	4	4	8	125	**1st**
2021	GT World Challenge Europe Endurance Cup	Barwell Motorsport	5	0	0	0	0	0	NC
2021	GT World Challenge Europe Endurance Cup - Pro-Am	Barwell Motorsport	5	0	0	0	3	78	**2nd**
2021	Intercontinental GT Challenge	Barwell Motorsport	1	0	0	0	0	0	NC
2022	FIA World Endurance Championship - LMGTE Am	TF Sport	5	2	2	0	3	113	**3rd**
2022	Asian Le Mans Series - GT	TF Sport	4	0	2	0	0	12.5	11th
2022	24 Hours of Le Mans - LMGTE Am	TF Sport	1	1	0	0	1	N/A	**1st**
2022	European Le Mans Series - LMGTE	Oman Racing with TF Sport	6	0	0	1	1	37	13th
2022	GT World Challenge Europe Endurance Cup	Garage 59	5	0	0	0	0	0	NC
2023	Asian Le Mans Series - GT	TF Sport	4	0	0	0	0	10	14th
2023	GT World Challenge Europe Endurance Cup	Garage 59	5	0	0	0	0	5	23rd
2023	GT World Challenge Europe Endurance Cup - Bronze	Garage 59	5	1	2	0	1	75	4th
2023	GT World Challenge Europe Sprint Cup	Garage 59	6	0	0	0	0	0	NC
2023	GT World Challenge Europe Sprint Cup - Bronze	Garage 59	6	2	1	0	3	60.5	**2nd**
2024	GT World Challenge Europe Endurance Cup	Walkenhorst Racing	5	0	0	0	0	12	18th
2025	GT World Challenge Europe Endurance Cup	Walkenhorst Motorsport	4	0	0	0	0	5	24th
2025	GT World Challenge Europe Sprint Cup	Walkenhorst Motorsport	10	0	0	0	0	0	NC
2026	GT World Challenge Europe Endurance Cup	natural elements by Walkenhorst Motorsport	4	0	0	0	0	7	28th
2026	International GT Open	Blackthorn	5	0	0	0	0	15	22nd
2026	24H Series - GT3	E2P Racing	1	0	0	0	0	20	34th

^{†} As Chaves was a guest driver, he was ineligible to score points. ^{*} Season still in progress.

=== Complete Formula Renault 2.0 NEC results ===
(key) (Races in bold indicate pole position) (Races in italics indicate fastest lap)

Year	Entrant	1	2	3	4	5	6	7	8	9	10	11	12	13	14	15	16	DC	Points
2015	AVF	MNZ; 1 Ret	MNZ; 2; 15	SIL; 1; 11	SIL; 2; 17	RBR; 1; 14	RBR; 2; 12	RBR; 3; 10	SPA; 1; 23	SPA; 2; 17	ASS; 1; 14	ASS; 2 Ret	NÜR; 1; 15	NÜR; 2 Ret	HOC; 1; 11	HOC; 2; 8	HOC; 3; 5	13th	101
2016	AVF by Adrián Vallés	MNZ; 1; 11	MNZ; 2; 10	SIL; 1; 22	SIL; 2 Ret	HUN; 1; 8	HUN; 2; 10	SPA; 1; 5	SPA; 2; 9	ASS; 1 Ret	ASS; 2; 14	NÜR; 1; 16	NÜR; 2; 17	HOC; 1; 10	HOC; 2; 15	HOC; 3 DNS		15th	106
2017	AVF	MNZ; 1	MNZ; 2	ASS; 1	ASS; 2	NÜR; 1	NÜR; 2	SPA; 1; 12	SPA; 2; 9	SPA; 3; 14	HOC; 1	HOC; 2						NC†	0

† As Chaves was a guest driver, he was ineligible for points

=== Complete Formula Renault Eurocup results ===
(key) (Races in bold indicate pole position) (Races in italics indicate fastest lap)

Year	Team	1	2	3	4	5	6	7	8	9	10	11	12	13	14	15	16	17	18	19	20	21	22	23	Pos	Points
2015	AVF	ALC; 1; 26	ALC; 2; 19	ALC; 3; 16	SPA; 1 Ret	SPA; 2; 24	HUN; 1	HUN; 2	SIL; 1	SIL; 2	SIL; 3	NÜR; 1 Ret	NÜR; 2; 30	LMS; 1	LMS; 2	JER; 1	JER; 2	JER; 3							NC†	0
2016	AVF by Adrián Vallés	ALC; 1; 7	ALC; 2; 9	ALC; 3; 16	MON; 1; 6	MNZ; 1; 16	MNZ; 2 Ret	MNZ; 1; 10	RBR; 1; 15	RBR; 2; 5	LEC; 1; 12	LEC; 2; 18	SPA; 1; 17	SPA; 2; 8	EST; 1; 17	EST; 2; 5									11th	41
2017	AVF by Adrián Vallés	MNZ; 1; 7	MNZ; 2 Ret	SIL; 1; 2	SIL; 2 Ret	PAU; 1 Ret	PAU; 2 Ret	MON; 1; 17	MON; 2 Ret	HUN; 1; 6	HUN; 2; 17	HUN; 3; 16	NÜR; 1; 5	NÜR; 2 Ret	RBR; 1; 7	RBR; 2; 10	LEC; 1 Ret	LEC; 2 Ret	SPA; 1; 12	SPA; 2; 9	SPA; 3; 14	CAT; 1; 11	CAT; 2; 12	CAT; 3; 16	12th	53

^{†} As Chaves was a guest driver, he was ineligible to score points

=== Complete World Series Formula V8 3.5 results ===
(key) (Races in bold indicate pole position) (Races in italics indicate fastest lap) (Small number denotes finishing position)

Year	Entrant	1	2	3	4	5	6	7	8	9	10	11	12	13	14	15	16	17	18	Pos	Points
2017	AVF	SIL; 1	SIL; 2	SPA; 1	SPA; 2	MNZ; 1	MNZ; 2	JER; 1	JER; 2	ALC; 1	ALC; 2	NÜR; 1	NÜR; 2	MEX; 1	MEX; 2	COA; 1	COA; 2	BHR; 1; 1	BHR; 2; 5	13th	35

=== Complete European Le Mans Series results ===
Year	Entrant	Class	Chassis	Engine	1	2	3	4	5	6	Rank	Points
2018	AVF by Adrián Vallés	LMP2	Dallara P217	Gibson GK428 4.2 L V8	LEC; 11	MNZ; Ret	RBR; 14	SIL; 8	SPA; 9‡	ALG; Ret	23rd	6
2022	Oman Racing with TF Sport	LMGTE	Aston Martin Vantage AMR	Aston Martin 4.0 L Turbo V8	LEC; 6	IMO; 2	MNZ; 11	CAT; 7	SPA; 8	ALG; 10	13th	37

^{‡} Half points awarded as less than 75% of race distance was completed.

=== Complete International GT Open results ===
(key) (Races in bold indicate pole position) (Races in italics indicate fastest lap)

Year	Team	Car	Class	1	2	3	4	5	6	7	8	9	10	11	12	13	14	Pos.	Points
2019	Teo Martín Motorsport	McLaren 720S GT3	Pro	LEC; 1; 2	LEC; 2; 7	HOC; 1; 4	HOC; 2; 5	SPA; 1; 3	SPA; 2; 2	RBR; 1; 3	RBR; 2; 4	SIL; 1; 4	SIL; 2; 6	CAT; 1; 3	CAT; 2; 4	MNZ; 1 Ret	MNZ; 2; 1	3rd	116
2020	Teo Martín Motorsport	McLaren 720S GT3	Pro	HUN; 1; 2	HUN; 2; 4	LEC; 1; 3	LEC; 2; 2	RBR; 1; 1	RBR; 2; 4	MNZ; 1; 4	**MNZ**; **2**; 2	SPA; 1; 4	SPA; 2; 1	CAT; 1; 6	CAT; 2; 10			1st	114
2026	Blackthorn	Aston Martin Vantage AMR GT3 Evo	Pro-Am	ALG; 1; 4	ALG; 2; 1	SPA	MIS; 1	MIS; 2	HUN; 1	HUN; 2	LEC; 1	LEC; 2	HOC; 1	HOC; 2	**MNZ**; 1	CAT; 1; 2	CAT; 2; 6	8th	46

=== Complete GT World Challenge Europe results ===
==== GT World Challenge Europe Endurance Cup ====
(key) (Races in bold indicate pole position) (Races in italics indicate fastest lap)

Year	Team	Car	Class	1	2	3	4	5	6	7	Pos.	Points
2021	Barwell Motorsport	Lamborghini Huracán GT3 Evo	Pro-Am	MNZ; 21	LEC; Ret	SPA; 6H; 19	SPA; 12H; 24	SPA; 24H; 18	NÜR; 24	CAT; 26	3rd	78
2022	Garage 59	McLaren 720S GT3	Pro-Am	IMO; 34	**LEC**; 25	SPA; 6H; 29	SPA; 12H; 24	SPA; 24H; 41†	**HOC**; 35	**CAT**; 40	3rd	99
2023	Garage 59	McLaren 720S GT3 Evo	Bronze	**MNZ**; 20	**LEC**; 33†	SPA; 6H; 11	SPA; 12H; 5	SPA; 24H; 34	NÜR; 25	CAT; 18	4th	75
2024	Walkenhorst Racing	Aston Martin Vantage AMR GT3 Evo	Pro	LEC; Ret	SPA; 6H; 16	SPA; 12H; 15	SPA; 24H; 4	NÜR; 13	MNZ; 23	JED; 11	18th	12
2025	Walkenhorst Motorsport	Aston Martin Vantage AMR GT3 Evo	Pro	LEC; 8	MNZ; 12	SPA; 6H; WD	SPA; 12H; WD	SPA; 24H; WD	NÜR; 14	CAT; 10	24th	5
2026	natural elements by Walkenhorst Motorsport	Aston Martin Vantage AMR GT3 Evo	Pro	LEC; WD	MNZ; 28	SPA; 6H; 32	SPA; 12H; 9	SPA; 24H; 7	NÜR; 16	ALG; 12	28th	7

==== GT World Challenge Europe Sprint Cup ====
(key) (Races in bold indicate pole position) (Races in italics indicate fastest lap)

Year	Team	Car	Class	1	2	3	4	5	6	7	8	9	10	Pos.	Points
2021	Barwell Motorsport	Lamborghini Huracán GT3 Evo	Pro-Am	MAG; 1; 23	MAG; 2; 16	**ZAN**; **1**; 18	**ZAN**; **2** DNS	MIS; 1; 18	MIS; 2; 23	**BRH**; **1**; 21	**BRH**; **2**; 21	VAL; 1; 20	VAL; 2; 22	1st	125
2023	Garage 59	McLaren 720S GT3 Evo	Bronze	**MIS**; **1**; 13	MIS; 2; 20	HOC; 1; 29	HOC; 2; 23	VAL; 1; 22	VAL; 2; 25					2nd	60.5
2025	Walkenhorst Motorsport	Aston Martin Vantage AMR GT3 Evo	Pro	BRH; 1; 25	BRH; 2; 18	ZAN; 1 Ret	ZAN; 2; 27	MIS; 1; 13	MIS; 2; 13	MAG; 1; 23	MAG; 2; 16	VAL; 1; 29	VAL; 2; 27	NC	0

=== Complete FIA World Endurance Championship results ===
(key) (Races in bold indicate pole position; races in italics indicate fastest lap)

Year	Entrant	Class	Car	Engine	1	2	3	4	5	6	Rank	Points
2022	TF Sport	LMGTE Am	Aston Martin Vantage AMR	Aston Martin 4.0 L Turbo V8	SEB	**SPA**; 2	LMS; 1	MNZ; Ret	**FUJ**; 1	BHR; 4	3rd	113

=== 24 Hours of Le Mans results ===
Year	Team	Co-Drivers	Car	Class	Laps	Pos.	Class Pos.
2022	(United Kingdom) TF Sport	(United States) Ben Keating (Denmark) Marco Sørensen	Aston Martin Vantage AMR	GTE; Am	343	34th	**1st**

Sporting positions
Preceded by Giacomo Altoè; Albert Costa	International GT Open; Champion; 2020; With: Miguel Ramos	Succeeded by Incumbent
Preceded by Eddie Cheever III; Chris Froggatt	GT World Challenge Europe Sprint Cup; Pro-Am Champion; 2021; With: Miguel Ramos	Succeeded by Miguel Ramos; Dean MacDonald
