= Ferrari Challenge =

Single-Marque Motorsport Championship

- Category: One-make racing
- Country: Italy (Formerly); Europe; North America; Asia-Pacific (Formerly); Japan; United Kingdom; Australasia; Middle East
- Inaugural season: 1993
- Constructors: Ferrari
- Tyre suppliers: Pirelli
- Official website: Official website

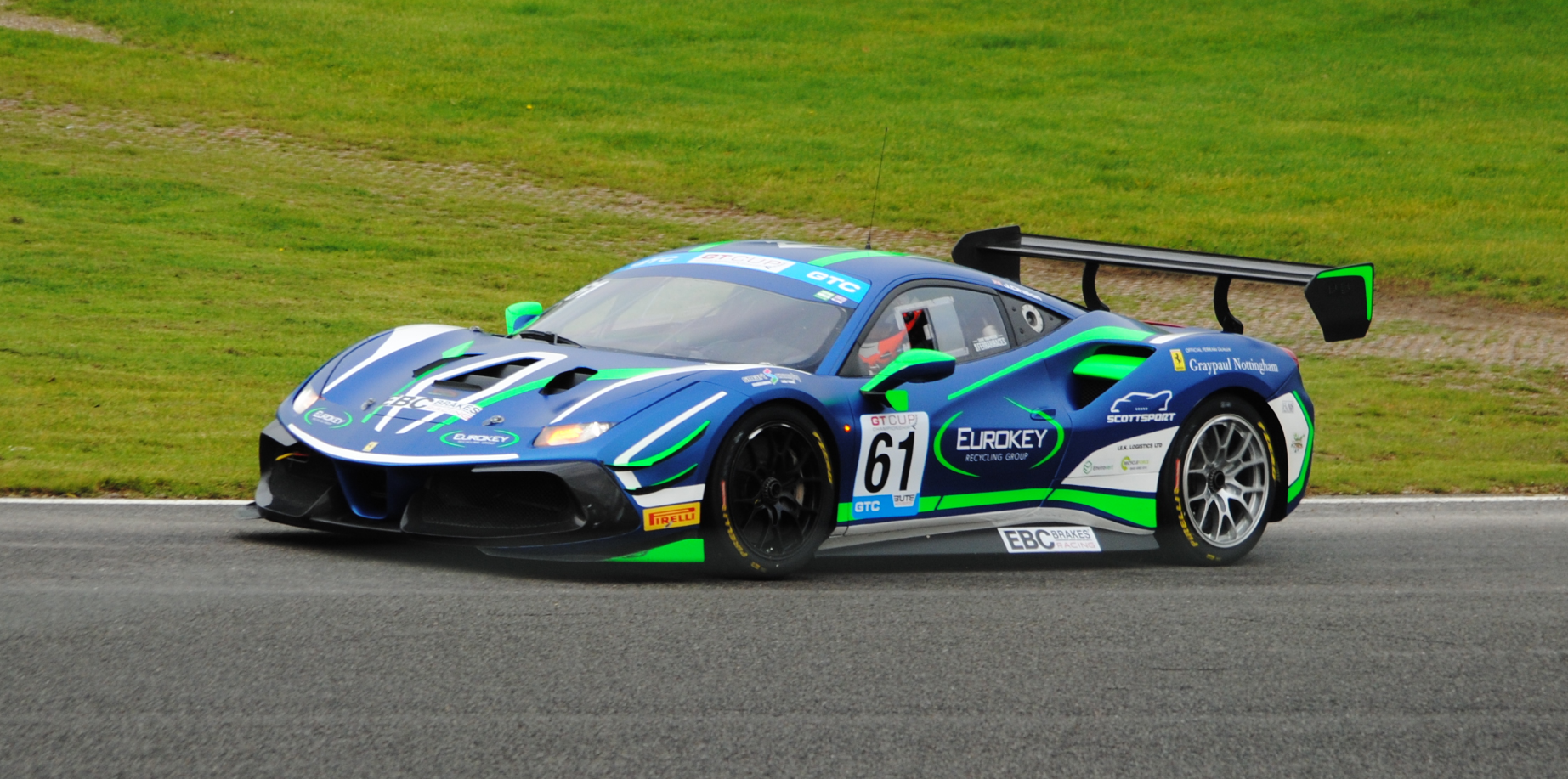
Ferrari 488 Challenge Evo

The Ferrari Challenge is a single-marque motorsport championship that was created in 1993, initially catering to owners of the 348 Challenge who wanted to race their cars. The first European season took place in 1993, with a North American series added in 1994. It now encompasses five official series in Europe, North America, Japan, The United Kingdom & Australasia. Competitors from each series are brought together at the annual World Finals (Finali Mondiali) event.

In the course of more than 30 years of history, the one-make championship has featured nine cars from the Maranello marque: the 348 Challenge, F355 Challenge, 360 Challenge, F430 Challenge, 458 Challenge, 458 Challenge Evo, 488 Challenge, 488 Challenge Evo and currently the 296 Challenge.

== Series ==
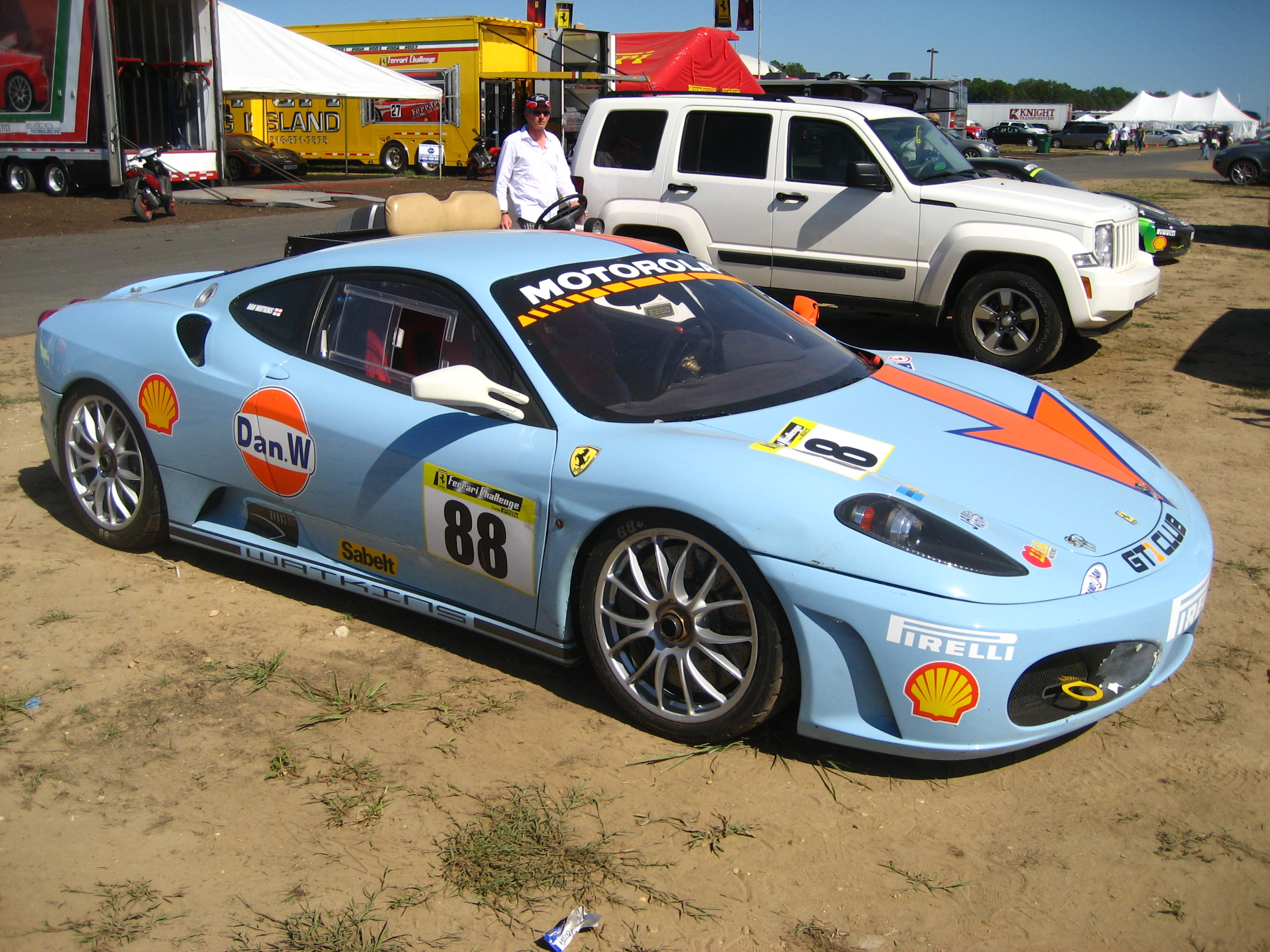
A Ferrari F430 Challenge car used in the North American series.

Currently there are five distinct series: in Europe, in North America, in the UK, in Australia and in Japan. The Ferrari Challenge is managed by Ferrari's Corse Clienti department.

=== Ferrari Challenge Italy ===
The now defunct Ferrari Challenge Italy used a two-class format in which distinguished between professional competition drivers in the Trofeo Pirelli (lit. "Pirelli Trophy") and amateur "gentleman drivers" in the Coppa Shell (lit. "Shell Cup"). This format has now been transferred to the Europe Challenge series. It was originally launched in 1993, with backing from Pirelli.

=== Ferrari Challenge Europe ===
The European series is a four-class championship, the classes are:

- Trofeo Pirelli
- Trofeo Pirelli Am
- Coppa Shell
- Coppa Shell Am

=== Ferrari Challenge North America ===
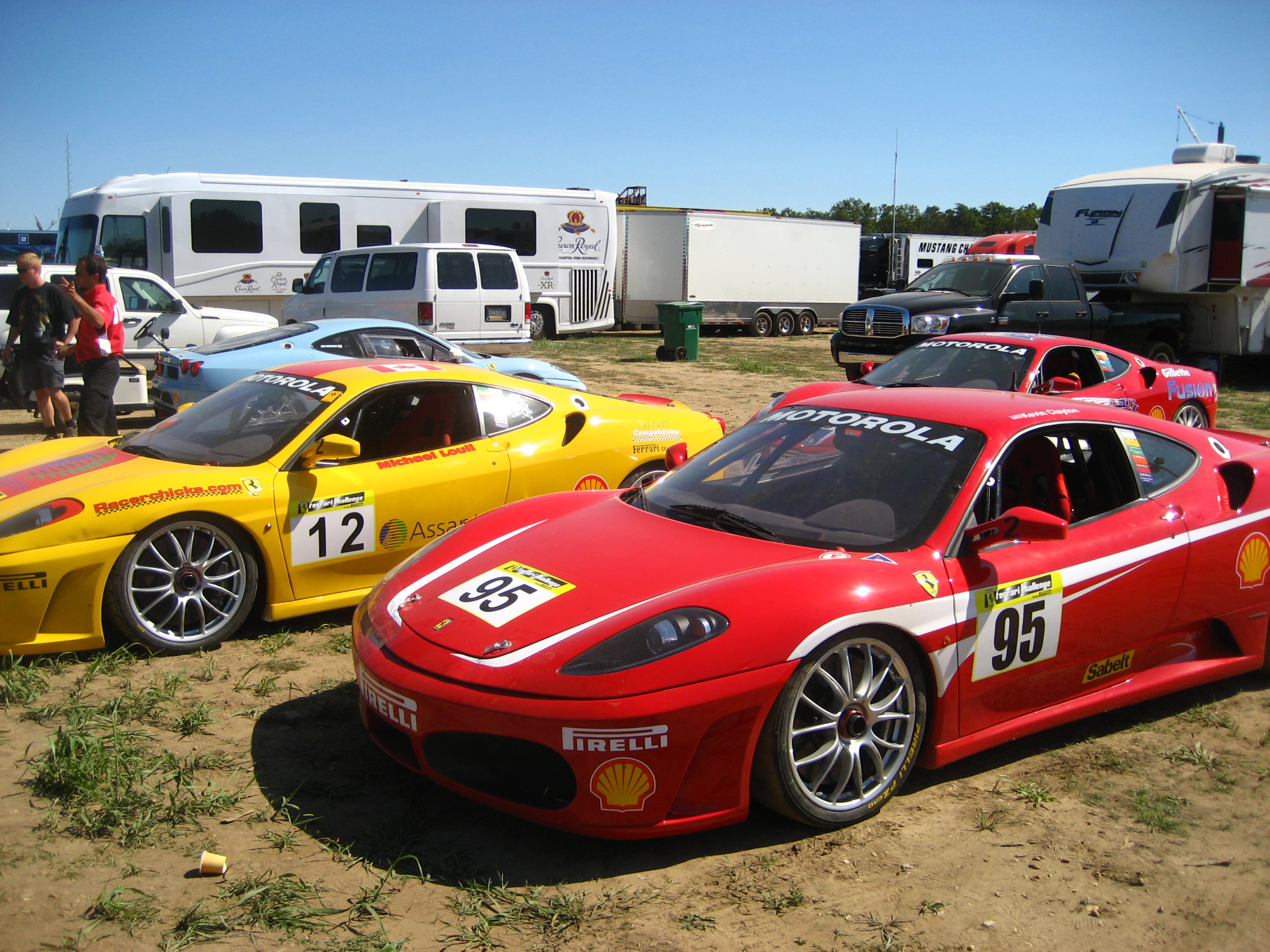
Ferrari F430 Challenge racer at New Jersey Motorsports Park, North American series (2008 season).

The North American series also features the Trofeo Pirelli and Coppa Shell class system. This championship was inaugurated in 1994. It is organized by Ferrari North America and sanctioned by IMSA. In 2024, it was run at the Las Vegas Strip Circuit track as a support race to the Las Vegas Grand Prix F1 series.

=== Ferrari Challenge Asia-Pacific ===
The Ferrari Challenge Asia-Pacific series was organized from 2011 to 2022 as the fourth created Ferrari Challenge Series after the original Italian, European & North American Series, inaugurated in combination with the growing interest and sales for Ferrari in Asia. The seasons included events in Japan, China, Malaysia, Australia, New Zealand and Singapore. The Asia-Pacific also featured the Trofeo Pirelli and Coppa Shell class system.

=== Ferrari Challenge UK ===
Starting with the 2019 season, the regional Ferrari Challenge UK series has been launched, contested at some of the UK's most iconic tracks, from Silverstone to Brands Hatch, Oulton Park to Snetterton.

=== Ferrari Challenge Japan ===
Starting with the 2023 season, the calendar of the Prancing Horse single-make series has been enriched with the second regional series & sixth overall series, the Ferrari Challenge Japan, which includes five rounds taking place at the tracks of Fuji (two rounds), Autopolis, Suzuka and Sugo.

=== Ferrari Challenge Australasia ===
2025 saw the launch of an Australian-based series with five rounds held at Australia's four largest motorsport venues including the Mount Panorama Circuit, The Bend Motorsport Park, Phillip Island Grand Prix Circuit & Sydney Motorsport Park. The series launched with a mix of 296 Challenge and 488 Challenge EVO equipped teams.

=== Ferrari Challenge Middle East ===
Announced at the 2025 Finali Mondiali, Ferrari Challenge is launching a new regional series for the 2026–27 season in the Middle East, running at Bahrain International Circuit, Lusail International Circuit, Jeddah Corniche Circuit and Yas Marina Circuit.

=== Ferrari Finalissima ===
The Ferrari Challenge Series has held a finals event since the official inception in 1993 and was always held at the Autodromo del Mugello until 1997 when the event was held in Enna Pergusa at the Autodromo di Pergusa, before being established as a World Finals Event, the Ferrari Finali Mondiali in 1998.

=== Finali Mondiali ===
In 1998 the Ferrari Finali Mondiali (Ferrari World Finals) were established and first held in Imola and has been a mainstay to crown the Marquee World Champions at the seasons end to bring together the continental champions on an even playfield. It often was mixed with Ferrari Racing Days and historic racing from Ferrari and Maserati and played host to ceremonies of Formula 1 and the FIA World Endurance Championship cars from Ferrari. From 2013, the major Ferrari Challenge series have combined to host a World Final common event for all championships. This event culminates in a race containing as many of the competitors across all series in both Trofeo Pirelli and Coppa Shell as can fit, with Ferrari declaring the winners to be "world champions". The following table has the winners of each event:

Year	Circuit	Trofeo Pirelli	Coppa Shell	Source
1998	(Italy) Autodromo Enzo e Dino Ferrari			
1999	(Italy) Autodromo di Vallelunga			
2000	(Italy) Mugello Circuit			
2001	(Italy) Autodromo Nazionale di Monza			
2002	(Italy) Circuito Internazionale Santa Monica Misano			
2003	(Italy) Mugello Circuit			
2004	(Italy) Autodromo Nazionale di Monza			
2005	(Italy) Mugello Circuit			
2006	(Italy) Autodromo Nazionale di Monza			
2007	(Italy) Mugello Circuit			
2008	(Italy) Mugello Circuit			
2009	(Spain) Circuit Ricardo Tormo			
2010	(Spain) Circuit Ricardo Tormo			
2011	(Italy) Mugello Circuit			
2012	(Spain) Circuit Ricardo Tormo			
2013	(Italy) Mugello Circuit	Pro: (Austria) Philipp Baron	Am: (Italy) Giosue Rizzuto	
2014	(United Arab Emirates) Yas Marina Circuit	Pro: (Italy) Max Blancardi; Pro-Am: (Mexico) Ricardo Pérez de Lara	Am: (Italy) Massimiliano Bianchi	
2015	(Italy) Mugello Circuit	Pro: (Italy) Matteo Santoponte; Pro-Am: (Italy) Alessandro Vezzoni	Am: (Italy) Erich Prinoth	
2016	(United States) Daytona International Speedway	Pro: (Venezuela) Carlos Kauffman; Pro-Am: (United Kingdom) Sam Smeeth	Am: (Germany) Thomas Löfflad	
2017	(Italy) Mugello Circuit	Pro: (Switzerland) Fabio Leimer; Pro-Am: (Germany) Jens Liebhauser	Am: (Denmark) Johnny Laursen	
2018	(Italy) Autodromo Nazionale Monza	Pro: (Denmark) Nicklas Nielsen; Pro-Am: (Liechtenstein) Fabienne Wohlwend	Pro-Am: (Switzerland) Christophe Hurni; Am: (Sweden) Ingvar Mattsson	
2019	(Italy) Mugello Circuit	Pro: (United Kingdom) Adam Carroll; Pro-Am: (Italy) Emanuele-Maria Tabacchi	Pro-Am: (United States) James Weiland; Am: (Sweden) Ingvar Mattsson	
2020	(Italy) Misano World Circuit	Pro: (Belgium) Florian Merckx; Pro-Am: (Netherlands) Han Sikkens	Pro-Am: (Netherlands) Roger Grouwels; Am: (Austria) Michael Simoncić	
2021	(Italy) Mugello Circuit	Pro: (Finland) Luka Nurmi; Pro-Am: (Denmark) Christian Brunsborg	Pro-Am: (Austria) Ernst Kirchmayr; Am: (Denmark) Peter Christensen	
2022	(Italy) Autodromo Enzo e Dino Ferrari	Pro: (France) Thomas Neubauer; Pro-Am: (Italy) Marco Pulcini	Pro-Am: (Germany) Franz Engstler; Am: (Sweden) Joakim Olander	
2023	(Italy) Mugello Circuit	Pro: (United Kingdom) Tom Fleming; Pro-Am: (Germany) Franz Engstler	Pro-Am: (Germany) Axel Sartingen; Am: (Germany) Martinus Richter	
2024	(Italy) Autodromo Enzo e Dino Ferrari	Pro: (Hungary) Bence Válint; Pro-Am: (United Kingdom) James Owen	Pro-Am: (France) Henry Hassid; Am: (Canada) Eric Cheung	
2025	(Italy) Mugello Circuit	Pro: (Italy) Vincenzo Scarpetta; Pro-Am: (Netherlands) Michael Verhagen	Pro-Am: (United States) Ray Acosta; Am: (Germany) Jan Sandmann	
2026	(Spain) Circuit de Barcelona-Catalunya	Pro: Pro-Am:	Pro-Am: Am:	

== Champions ==
Year	Italy		Europe		North America		Asia-Pacific		UK		Japan		Australasia		Middle East	
Year	Trofeo Pirelli	Coppa Shell	Trofeo Pirelli	Coppa Shell	Trofeo Pirelli	Coppa Shell	Trofeo Pirelli	Coppa Shell	Trofeo Pirelli	Coppa Shell	Trofeo Pirelli	Coppa Shell	Trofeo Pirelli	Coppa Shell	Trofeo Pirelli	Coppa Shell
1993	(Italy) Roberto Ragazzi		(Germany) Bernd Hahne		Not Held		Not Held		Not Held		Not Held		Not Held		Not Held	
1993	report		report		Not Held		Not Held		Not Held		Not Held		Not Held		Not Held	
1994	(Italy) Roberto Ragazzi		(Germany) Harald Brutschin		(United States) John Marconi		Not Held		Not Held		Not Held		Not Held		Not Held	
1994	report		report		report		Not Held		Not Held		Not Held		Not Held		Not Held	
1995	(Italy) Gianluca Giraudi		Central: (Germany) Harald Brutschin; West: (France) Lucien Guitteny		(United States) Peter Sachs	(United States) George Robinson	Not Held		Not Held		Not Held		Not Held		Not Held	
1995	report		report		report		Not Held		Not Held		Not Held		Not Held		Not Held	
1996	(Italy) Luca Drudi		Central: (Germany) Bernd Hahne; West: (France) Lucien Guitteny		(United States) Steve Earle	(United States) Jim Kenton	Not Held		Not Held		Not Held		Not Held		Not Held	
1996	report		report		report		Not Held		Not Held		Not Held		Not Held		Not Held	
1997	(Italy) Fabrizio De Simone		Central: (Switzerland) Bruno Staub; West:		(United States) Tom Papadopoulos		Not Held		Not Held		Not Held		Not Held		Not Held	
1997	report		report		report		Not Held		Not Held		Not Held		Not Held		Not Held	
1998	(Italy) Angelo Zadra		Central: (Switzerland) Bruno Staub; West:		(United States) Tom Papadopoulos	(United States) Steve Earle	Not Held		Not Held		Not Held		Not Held		Not Held	
1998	report		report		report		Not Held		Not Held		Not Held		Not Held		Not Held	
1999	(Italy) Stefano Livio		Central: (Switzerland) Daniel Künzli; West: (Belgium) Edward van der Pluijm		(United States) Steve Earle		Not Held		Not Held		Not Held		Not Held		Not Held	
1999	report		report		report		Not Held		Not Held		Not Held		Not Held		Not Held	
2000	(Italy) Fabio Santaniello				(United States) Steve Earle	(United States) Christian Briggs	Not Held		Not Held		Not Held		Not Held		Not Held	
2000	report		report		report		Not Held		Not Held		Not Held		Not Held		Not Held	
2001	(Italy) Giacomo Piccini		Pro: (France) Ange Barde		(United States) Lucio Nicolodi	(United States) Philip Shearer	Not Held		Not Held		Not Held		Not Held		Not Held	
2001	report		report		report		Not Held		Not Held		Not Held		Not Held		Not Held	
2002	(Italy) Vito Postiglione	(Italy) Vincenzo Zanini			(United States) Darius Grala		Not Held		Not Held		Not Held		Not Held		Not Held	
2002	report		report		report		Not Held		Not Held		Not Held		Not Held		Not Held	
2003	(Italy) Adriano De Micheli	(Italy) Piergiuseppe Perazzini	Pro: (France) Ange Barde		(United States) Jim Kenton		Not Held		Not Held		Not Held		Not Held		Not Held	
2003	report		report		report		Not Held		Not Held		Not Held		Not Held		Not Held	
2004	(Italy) Nicola Cadei	(Italy) "Babato" Renato di Amato	Pro: (France) Ange Barde		(Canada) Emmanuel Anassis		Not Held		Not Held		Not Held		Not Held		Not Held	
2004	report		report		report		Not Held		Not Held		Not Held		Not Held		Not Held	
2005	(Italy) Nicola Cadei	(Italy) Ivano Rossi	Pro: (Republic of Ireland) Michael Cullen		(Canada) Emmanuel Anassis		Not Held		Not Held		Not Held		Not Held		Not Held	
2005	report		report		report		Not Held		Not Held		Not Held		Not Held		Not Held	
2006	(Italy) Max Blancardi	(Italy) Giuseppe Fascicolo	Pro: (France) Ange Barde	Am: ??	(Canada) Emmanuel Anassis		Not Held		Not Held		Not Held		Not Held		Not Held	
2006	report		report		report		Not Held		Not Held		Not Held		Not Held		Not Held	
2007	(Italy) Vito Postiglione	(Italy) Fillipo Zanier	Pro: (Republic of Ireland) Michael Cullen	Am: (Switzerland) Loyd La Marca	Pro: (United States) Mike Zoi		Not Held		Not Held		Not Held		Not Held		Not Held	
2007	report		report		report		Not Held		Not Held		Not Held		Not Held		Not Held	
2008	(Italy) Maurizio Mediani	(Italy) Giorgio Massazza	Pro: (Italy) Max Blancardi	Am: (United Kingdom) Michael Cantillon	Pro: (United States) Roberto Fata		Not Held		Not Held		Not Held		Not Held		Not Held	
2008	report		report		report		Not Held		Not Held		Not Held		Not Held		Not Held	
2009	(Italy) Stefano Gai	(Italy) Giuseppe Presti	Pro: (France) Nicolas Misslin	Am: (France) Jean-Marc Bachelier	(United States) Mark McKenzie		Not Held		Not Held		Not Held		Not Held		Not Held	
2009	report		report		report		Not Held		Not Held		Not Held		Not Held		Not Held	
2010	(Italy) Stefano Gai	(Italy) Vincenzo Sauto	Pro: (Austria) Philipp Baron	Am: (Germany) Wido Rößler	(Venezuela) Enzo Potolicchio		Not Held		Not Held		Not Held		Not Held		Not Held	
2010	report		report		report		Not Held		Not Held		Not Held		Not Held		Not Held	
2011	(Italy) Stefano Gai	(Italy) Benedetto Marti	Pro: (Italy) Max Blancardi	Am: (France) Jean-Marc Bachelier	(Venezuela) Enzo Potolicchio			Am: (Hong Kong) Alex Au	Not Held		Not Held		Not Held		Not Held	
2011	report		report		report		report		Not Held		Not Held		Not Held		Not Held	
2012	Not Held		Pro: (Italy) Alessandro Balzan	Am: (Russia) Aleksey Basov	(United States) Onofrio Triarsi	Am: (Canada) Damon Ockey		Am: (Hong Kong) Alex Au	Not Held		Not Held		Not Held		Not Held	
2012	Not Held		report		report		report		Not Held		Not Held		Not Held		Not Held	
2013	Not Held		Pro: (Ukraine) Sergiy Chukanov	Am: (Germany) Dirk Adamski	(United States) Onofrio Triarsi	Am: (Brazil) João Adibe	Pro: (Thailand) Pasin Lathouras	Am: (Hong Kong) Eric Cheung	Not Held		Not Held		Not Held		Not Held	
2013	Not Held		report		report		report		Not Held		Not Held		Not Held		Not Held	
2014	Not Held		Pro: (Italy) Daniele di Amato; Pro-Am: (Argentina) Ezequiel Pérez Companc	Am: (Italy) Massimiliano Bianchi	(Mexico) Ricardo Pérez de Lara	Am: (United States) Christopher Ruud	Pro: (Hong Kong) Eric Cheung	Am: (Indonesia) David Tjiptobiantoro	Not Held		Not Held		Not Held		Not Held	
2014	Not Held		report		report		report		Not Held		Not Held		Not Held		Not Held	
2015	Not Held		Pro: (Germany) Björn Grossmann; Pro-Am: (Sweden) Martin Nelson	Am: (Belgium) Jacques Duyver	Pro: (Canada) Emmanuel Anassis; Pro-Am: (United States) Mike Zoi	Am: (United States) Jean-Claude Saada	Pro: (Australia) Stephen Wyatt; Pro-Am: (China) Wei Xu	Pro-Am: (China) Xin Jin	Not Held		Not Held		Not Held		Not Held	
2015	Not Held		report		report		report		Not Held		Not Held		Not Held		Not Held	
2016	Not Held		Pro: (Germany) Björn Grossmann; Pro-Am: (United Kingdom) Sam Smeeth	Am: (Germany) Thomas Löfflad	Pro: (Venezuela) Carlos Kauffman; Pro-Am: (United States) James Weiland	Am: (United States) Joe Courtney	Pro: (Belgium) Florian Merckx; Pro-Am: (China) Xin Jin	Am: (China) Liang Wang	Not Held		Not Held		Not Held		Not Held	
2016	Not Held		report		report		report		Not Held		Not Held		Not Held		Not Held	
2017	Not Held		Pro: (Italy) Daniele di Amato; Pro-Am: (Germany) Jens Liebhauser	Am: (Denmark) Johnny Laursen	Pro: (United States) Brett Curtis; Pro-Am: (United States) Chris Cagnazzi	Am: (United States) Richard Baek	Pro: (Italy) Philippe Prette; Pro-Am: (Japan) Ken Seto	Pro-Am: (Japan) Makoto Fujiwara	Not Held		Not Held		Not Held		Not Held	
2017	Not Held		report		report		report		Not Held		Not Held		Not Held		Not Held	
2018	Not Held		Pro: (Denmark) Nicklas Nielsen; Pro-Am: (United Kingdom) Chris Froggatt	Pro-Am: (Switzerland) Christophe Hurni; Am: (Turkey) Murat Cuhadaroğlu	Pro: (United States) Cooper MacNeil; Pro-Am: (United States) Ross Chouest	Pro-Am: (United States) Thomas Tippl; Am: (United States) John Megrue	Pro: (Italy) Philippe Prette	Pro-Am: (Lebanon) Tani Hanna; Am: (New Zealand) David Dicker	Not Held		Not Held		Not Held		Not Held	
2018	Not Held		report		report		report		Not Held		Not Held		Not Held		Not Held	
2019	Not Held		Pro: (Monaco) Louis Prette; Pro-Am: (Italy) Emanuele-Maria Tabacchi	Pro-Am: (Lebanon) Tani Hanna; Am: (Denmark) Henrik Jansen	Pro: (United States) Cooper MacNeil; Pro-Am: (United States) Neil Gehani	Pro-Am: (United States) Mark Issa; Am: (United States) Bradley Horstmann	Pro-Am: (Italy) Philippe Prette	Pro-Am: (Japan) Makoto Fujiwara; Am: (South Korea) "Andrew" Moon	(United Kingdom) Jamie Clarke	(United Kingdom) Toby Flannagan	Not Held		Not Held		Not Held	
2019	Not Held		report		report		report		report		Not Held		Not Held		Not Held	
2020	Not Held		Pro: (Italy) Emanuele-Maria Tabacchi; Pro-Am: (Denmark) Frederik Paulsen	Pro-Am: (Netherlands) Roger Grouwels; Am: (France) "Alex Fox"	Pro: (United States) Cooper MacNeil; Pro-Am: (United States) David Musial	Pro-Am: (United States) Bradley Horstmann; Am: (United States) Justin Wetherill	Not Held		(United Kingdom) Lucky Khera	(United Kingdom) Jamie Thwaites	Not Held		Not Held		Not Held	
2020	Not Held		report		report		Not Held		report		Not Held		Not Held		Not Held	
2021	Not Held		Pro: (Denmark) Michelle Gatting; Pro-Am: (Spain) Sergio Paulet	Pro-Am: (Austria) Ernst Kirchmayr; Am: (Netherlands) Willem van der Vorm	Pro: (United States) Cooper MacNeil; Pro-Am: (United States) Jason McCarthy	Pro-Am: (United States) Dave Musial Jr. Am: (Canada) John Cervini			(United Kingdom) James Swift	(United Kingdom) Graham de Zille	Not Held		Not Held		Not Held	
2021	Not Held		report		report		report		report		Not Held		Not Held		Not Held	
2022	Not Held		Pro: (France) Doriane Pin; Pro-Am: (France) Ange Barde	Pro-Am: (Germany) Franz Engstler; Am: (Austria) Alexander Nussbaumer	Pro: (United States) Jeremy Clarke; Pro-Am: (United States) David Musial, Jr.	Pro-Am: (United States) Michael Petramalo; Am: (United States) Tony Davis	Am: (Japan) Yudai Uchida	Pro-Am: (Japan) Kazuyuki Yamaguchi; Am: (Japan) Shigeru Kamiue	(United Kingdom) Lucky Khera	(United Kingdom) Jason Ambrose	Not Held		Not Held		Not Held	
2022	Not Held		report		report		report		report		Not Held		Not Held		Not Held	
2023	Not Held		Pro: (Italy) Eliseo Donno; Pro-Am: (Germany) Franz Engstler	Pro-Am: (Germany) Axel Sartingen; Am: (Japan) Motohiko Isozaki	Pro: (United States) Matthew Kurzejewski; Pro-Am: (United States) Justin Rothenberg	Pro-Am: (United States) Cameron Root; Am: (United States) Lisa Clark			(United Kingdom) Andrew Morrow	(United Kingdom) Paul Hogarth	Pro: (Japan) Yudai Uchida; Am: (Hong Kong) "Eric Lo"	Pro-Am: (Japan) Kazuyuki Yamaguchi; Am: (Japan) "Masato"	Not Held		Not Held	
2023	Not Held		report		report		report		report		report		Not Held		Not Held	
2024	Not Held		Pro: (Italy) Giacomo Altoè; Pro-Am: (Denmark) Claus Zibrandtsen	Pro-Am: (France) Henry Hassid; Am: (Greece) Zois Skrimpias	Pro: (United States) Dylan Medler; Pro-Am: (United States) Brian Cook; 488 Challenge Pirelli: (United States) Massimo Perrina	Pro-Am: (United States) Eric Marston; Am: (United States) Roger Monteforte; 488 Challenge Shell: (United States) Matt Dalton			(United Kingdom) Gilbert Yates	(United Kingdom) Robert Rees	Pro: (Japan) Yudai Uchida; Am: (Japan) "Cold Max"	Pro-Am: (Japan) Tsutomu Shimoyama; Am: (China) "Liang Cheng Yu"	Not Held		Not Held	
2024	Not Held		report		report		report		report		report		Not Held		Not Held	
2025	Not Held		Pro: (Switzerland) Felix Hirsiger; Pro-Am: (Czech Republic) Hendrik Viol	Pro-Am: (Italy) Manuela Gostner; Am: (Germany) Sven Schömer	Pro: (United States) Massimo Perrina; Pro-Am: (United States) Brad Fauvre	Pro-Am: (United States) Mitchell Green; Am: (Canada) Michael Owens	Not Held		(United Kingdom) Gilbert Yates	(United Kingdom) Mike Dewhirst	Pro: (Japan) Sota Muto; Am: Motohiko Isozaki	Pro-Am: (South Korea) Phil Kim; Am: (France) Alex Fox	Pro: (Australia) Antoine Gittany; 488 Challenge: (Australia) Michel Stephan	Pro-Am: (Australia) Enzo Cheng	Not Held	
2025	Not Held		report		report		Not Held		report		report		report		Not Held	
2026	Not Held		Pro: (Spain) Sergio Paulet; Pro-Am: (Netherlands) Michael Verhagen	Pro-Am: Am: (South Korea) Jean Ryu	Pro: (United States) Johnny Kaminskey; Pro-Am:	Pro-Am: Am:	Not Held		(United Kingdom) Gilbert Yates	(United Kingdom) Christopher Beighton	Pro: (Japan) "Yamatatsu"; Am: "Kenbow"	Pro-Am: (Japan) "Tan"; Am: (Japan) Kento Inami	Pro: (Australia) Enzo Cheng; 488 Challenge: (Australia) Ross Tomain	Pro-Am: (Australia) David Trewern		
2026	Not Held		report		report		Not Held		report		report		report		report	

== One-make racing ==
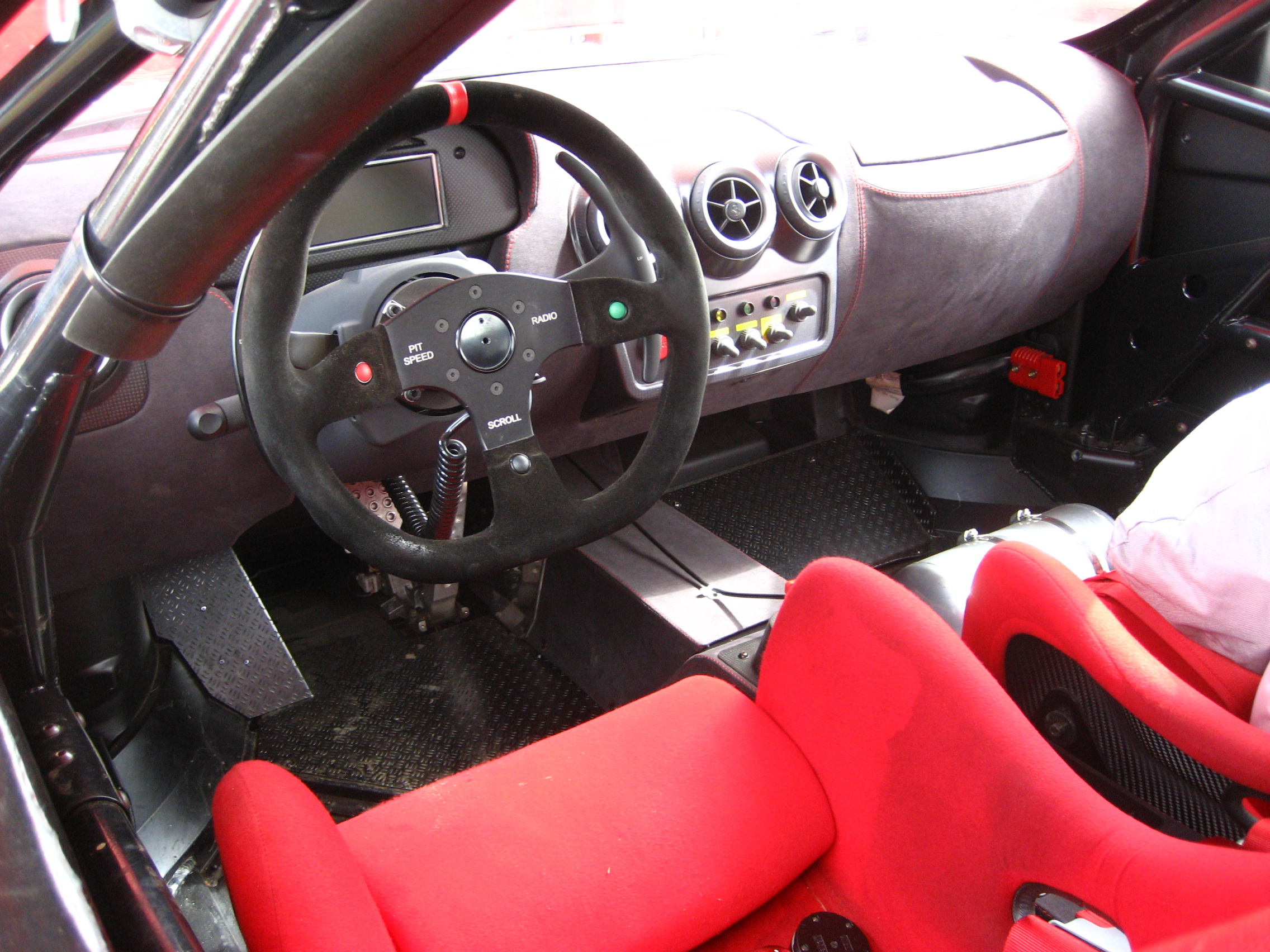
The cockpit of a F430 Challenge carries only basic racing necessities.

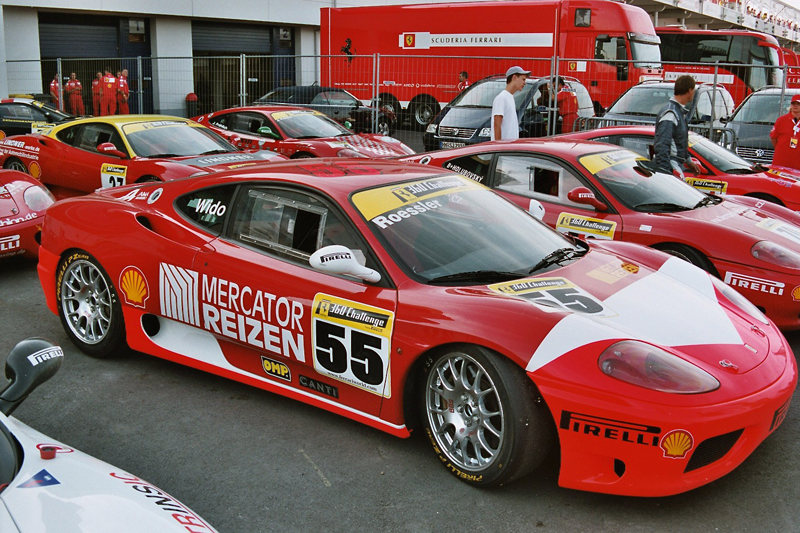
The Ferrari 360 Modena Challenge was the Ferrari Challenge racer replacing the F355 Challenge.

The Ferrari Challenge uses a single model from the manufacturer's road car range, suitably modified to make them safe for competition use. The lineage began with the 348 Challenge in 1993, followed by its successor, the F355 Challenge, and the 360 Modena was introduced in 2000. The F355 remained eligible during 2000 and 2001. The 360 Challenge version was the first competition-orientated version to be marketed to the public. The F430 Challenge was phased in during a transitional year in 2006, with the same being the case for the 458 Challenge in 2011. The F430 introduced carbon-ceramic brake discs for the first time and gained 80 hp (60 kW) over the 360CS, which has reduced lap times to approximately three seconds shy of the F430 GT2. The 458 Challenge is the first to have driver controlled aids such as traction control, stability management and adjustable ABS brakes.

=== Ferrari Challenge racing cars ===
The 296 Challenge is the most recent in a line of Ferraris used in the Ferrari Challenge series. The lineage is as follows:

- Ferrari 348 Challenge (1993–1995)
- Ferrari F355 Challenge (1995–2000)
- Ferrari 360 Modena Challenge (2000–2006)
- Ferrari F430 Challenge (2006–2011)
- Ferrari 458 Challenge (2011–2013)
- Ferrari 458 Challenge Evo (2014–2016)
- Ferrari 488 Challenge (2017–2020)
- Ferrari 488 Challenge Evo (2020–present)
- Ferrari 296 Challenge (2024-present)

All the cars used in the series are track only, although some 360 Challenges have been made road legal in Australia, with extensive modifications. However, due to new legislation, this is not possible anymore. The 360 Modena Challenge used in the series should not be confused with the 360 Challenge Stradale, which was a road-legal, track day oriented version of the 360, similar to the 430 Scuderia.

== Racing simulators based on the series ==
In 1999, Sega's producer Yu Suzuki created Ferrari F355 Challenge: Passione Rossa, a video game based on the Ferrari F355 Challenge series.

In 2008, System 3's Mark Cale created Ferrari Challenge: Trofeo Pirelli, the official game of the Ferrari Challenge featuring the licensed Ferrari F430 Challenge Italian, European and North American 2007 series.

In 2012, Ferrari Challenge appeared in Test Drive: Ferrari Racing Legends.

In 2024, iRacing added the Ferrari 296 Challenge car to replace the Ferrari 296 GT3 in the iRacing Ferrari Challenge Series

== See also ==
- Lamborghini Super Trofeo
- Mazda MX-5 Cup
- Mustang Challenge
- Porsche Carrera Cup
- Audi R8 LMS Cup
- Trofeo Maserati
