= 2026 Ferrari Challenge Australasia =

Motor racing championship

The 2026 Ferrari Challenge Australasia was the second season of Ferrari Challenge Australasia. The season consisted of five rounds, starting at Mount Panorama Circuit on 1 February and concluded at Sydney Motorsport Park on 20 September. It was open for Ferrari 296 Challenge and Ferrari 488 Challenge cars with the competition being divided between three classes – Trofeo Pirelli, Coppa Shell and the 488 Challenge.

== Calendar ==
Rd	Circuit	City	Date	Supporting
1	(New South Wales) Mount Panorama Circuit	Bathurst, New South Wales	1–2 February	Bathurst 12 Hour
2	(Victoria (state)) Phillip Island Grand Prix Circuit	Phillip Island, Victoria	27–28 March	GT World Challenge Australia; GT4 Australia Series
3	(South Australia) The Bend Motorsport Park	Tailem Bend, South Australia	8–10 May	GT World Challenge Australia; GT4 Australia Series
4	Queensland Raceway	Ipswich, Queensland	20–21 June	Stand-alone event
5	(New South Wales) Sydney Motorsport Park	Eastern Creek, New South Wales	18–20 September	GT World Challenge Australia; GT4 Australia Series

== Entries ==
Car	Entrant	No.	Driver Name	Class	Rounds
296 Challenge	Ferrari Sydney	1	(Australia) Antoine Gittany	P	1–2
296 Challenge	Ferrari Sydney	2	(Australia) Robert Scott	PA	3
296 Challenge	Ferrari Sydney	7	(Australia) Jim Pollicina	P	All
296 Challenge	Ferrari Sydney	17	(Australia) Enzo Cheng	P	All
296 Challenge	Ferrari Sydney	88	(Australia) Adnan Sibai	P	1–4
296 Challenge	Ferrari Sydney	131	(Australia) Mark Hudders	PA	4
296 Challenge	Ferrari Sydney	170	(Australia) David Frish	PA	4
296 Challenge	Continental Cars Ferrari	2	(New Zealand) Rick Armstrong	P	1–2
296 Challenge	Continental Cars Ferrari	164	(New Zealand) Michael Walker	PA	1–3, 5
296 Challenge	Ferrari Melbourne	9	(Austria) Ernst Kirchmayr	P	2
296 Challenge	Ferrari Melbourne	14	(Australia) Damien Hamilton	P	2–5
296 Challenge	Ferrari Melbourne	144	(Australia) Andrew Cogan	PA	3, 5
296 Challenge	Ferrari Melbourne	144	(Australia) Jason Yu	PA	4
296 Challenge	Ferrari Richmond	44	(Australia) Rod Wilson	P	1
296 Challenge	Barbagallo Ferrari	77	(Australia) Steve Wyatt	P	3–5
296 Challenge	Ferrari Adelaide	100	(Australia) Aemel Nordin	PA	All
296 Challenge	Ferrari Brisbane	105	(Japan) Masahiro Taguchi	PA	All
296 Challenge	Ferrari Brisbane	111	(Australia) Tony Baildon	PA	2–5
296 Challenge	Ferrari Gold Coast	127	(Australia) David Trewern	PA	All
296 Challenge	Cornes Osaka	193	(Japan) Baby Kei	PA	2–3, 5
488 Challenge Evo	Ferrari Adelaide	222	(South Africa) Greg Symons	488	5
488 Challenge Evo	Barbagallo Ferrari	224	(Australia) Frank Italiano	488	1, 5
488 Challenge Evo	Ferrari Gold Coast	233	(Australia) Ross Tomain	488	All
488 Challenge Evo	Ferrari Gold Coast	256	(Australia) Stephen Coe	488	1, 3–4
488 Challenge Evo	Ferrari Melbourne	256	(Australia) Jason Yu	488	2, 5
488 Challenge Evo	Ferrari Sydney	271	(Australia) Tim Howes	488	5
488 Challenge Evo	Ferrari Sydney	288	(Australia) Andrei Cheng	488	5
488 Challenge Evo	Continental Cars Ferrari	275	(New Zealand) Richard Moore	488	1
488 Challenge Evo	Continental Cars Ferrari	275	(New Zealand) Rob Steele	488	2

Class	Description
P	Trofeo Pirelli
PA	Coppa Shell
488	Trofeo Pirelli 488

== Results and standings ==
Rd	Race	Circuit	Pole Position	Trofeo Pirelli Winners	Coppa Shell Winners	Trofeo Pirelli 488 Winners	Results
1	1	(New South Wales) Mount Panorama Circuit	(Australia) Enzo Cheng	(Australia) Enzo Cheng	(Australia) David Trewern	(New Zealand) Richard Moore	
1	2	(New South Wales) Mount Panorama Circuit	(Australia) Enzo Cheng	(New Zealand) Rick Armstrong	(Australia) David Trewern	(New Zealand) Richard Moore	
2	3	(Victoria (state)) Phillip Island Grand Prix Circuit	(Austria) Ernst Kirchmayr	(New Zealand) Rick Armstrong	(Australia) Aemel Nordin	(Australia) Ross Tomain	
2	4	(Victoria (state)) Phillip Island Grand Prix Circuit	(Australia) Enzo Cheng	(Australia) Jim Pollicina	(Japan) Masahiro Taguchi	(Australia) Ross Tomain	
3	5	(South Australia) The Bend Motorsport Park	(Australia) Damian Hamilton	(Australia) Damian Hamilton	(Australia) David Trewan	(Australia) Ross Tomain	
3	6	(South Australia) The Bend Motorsport Park	(Australia) Damian Hamilton	(Australia) Steve Wyatt	(Australia) Andrew Cogan	(Australia) Ross Tomain	
4	7	Queensland Raceway	(Australia) Damian Hamilton	(Australia) Damian Hamilton	(Australia) David Trewan	(Australia) Ross Tomain	
4	8	Queensland Raceway	(Australia) Damian Hamilton	(Australia) Damian Hamilton	(Australia) David Trewan	(Australia) Ross Tomain	
5	9	(New South Wales) Sydney Motorsport Park	(Australia) Enzo Cheng	(Australia) Enzo Cheng	(Australia) David Trewan	(Australia) Ross Tomain	
5	10	(New South Wales) Sydney Motorsport Park	(Australia) Enzo Cheng	(Australia) Steve Wyatt	(Japan) Masahiro Taguchi	(Australia) Andrei Cheng	

=== Championship standings ===
==== Trofeo Pirelli ====
Pos.	Driver	(New South Wales) BAT		(Victoria (state)) PHI		(South Australia) BEN		(Queensland) QUE		(New South Wales) SYD		Points
Pos.	Driver	R1	R2	R1	R2	R1	R2	R1	R2	R1	R2	Points
1	(Australia) Jim Pollicina	3	2	5	1	12	3	3	2			82
2	(Australia) Enzo Cheng	1	11	4	Ret	4	2	2	4			72
3	(Australia) Damian Hamilton			6	7	1	5	1	1			72
4	(New Zealand) Rick Armstrong	4	1	1	Ret							41
5	(Australia) Adnan Sibai	Ret	9	8	3	Ret	7	8	9			40
6	(Australia) Steve Wyatt					2	1	Ret	3			38
7	(Australia) Antoine Gittany	2	Ret	2	Ret							28
8	(Australia) Robert Scott					3	4					18
9	(Australia) Rod Wilson	5	3									16
10	(Austria) Ernst Kirchmayer			3	Ret							11
Pos.	Driver	R1	R2	R1	R2	R1	R2	R1	R2	R1	R2	Points
Pos.	Driver	(New South Wales) BAT		(Victoria (state)) PHI		(South Australia) BEN		(Queensland) QUE		(New South Wales) SYD		Points

==== Coppa Shell ====
Pos.	Driver	(New South Wales) BAT		(Victoria (state)) PHI		(South Australia) BEN		(Queensland) QUE		(New South Wales) SYD		Points
Pos.	Driver	R1	R2	R1	R2	R1	R2	R1	R2	R1	R2	Points
1	(Australia) David Trewern	7	4	9	Ret	5	10	4	5			101
2	(Japan) Masahiro Taguchi	8	5	11	2	7	8	6	6			98
3	(Australia) Aemel Nordin	12	6	7	Ret	Ret	9	7	8			62
4	(Japan) Baby Kei			12	5	8	11					34
5	(Australia) Tony Baildon			15	9	9	12	10	11			34
6	(Australia) Andrew Cogan					6	6					28
7	(Australia) Mark Hudders							5	7			23
8	(New Zealand) Michael Walker	9	DNS	16	DNS	10	DNS					18
9	(Australia) Jason Yu							9	10			12
10	(Australia) David Frish							12	12			4
Pos.	Driver	R1	R2	R1	R2	R1	R2	R1	R2	R1	R2	Points
Pos.	Driver	(New South Wales) BAT		(Victoria (state)) PHI		(South Australia) BEN		(Queensland) QUE		(New South Wales) SYD		Points

==== Trofeo Pirelli 488 ====
Pos.	Driver	(New South Wales) BAT		(Victoria (state)) PHI		(South Australia) BEN		(Queensland) QUE		(New South Wales) SYD		Points
Pos.	Driver	R1	R2	R1	R2	R1	R2	R1	R2	R1	R2	Points
1	(Australia) Ross Tomain	10	8	10	4	11	13	11	13			126
2	(Australia) Stephen Coe	11	10			13	14	13	14			68
3	(New Zealand) Richard Moore	6	7									34
4	(New Zealand) Rob Steele			13	8							22
5	(Australia) Jason Yu			14	7							22
6	(Australia) Frank Italiano	13	12									16
Pos.	Driver	R1	R2	R1	R2	R1	R2	R1	R2	R1	R2	Points
Pos.	Driver	(New South Wales) BAT		(Victoria (state)) PHI		(South Australia) BEN		(Queensland) QUE		(New South Wales) SYD		Points
