= 2020 Ferrari Challenge North America =

Ferrari Challenge

The 2020 Ferrari Challenge North America was the 27th season of the Ferrari Challenge competition in North America. The season was 7 rounds, starting at the Daytona International Speedway on 23 January 2020 and concluding at the Misano World Circuit on 6 March 2021.

== Calendar ==
| Rnd. | Circuit | Dates |
|---|---|---|
| 1 | (United States) Daytona International Speedway | 23–24 January 2020 |
| 2 | (United States) Road Atlanta | 7–8 March 2020 |
| 3 | (United States) Indianapolis Motor Speedway | 26–27 July 2020 |
| 4 | (United States) Circuit of the Americas | 29–30 August 2020 |
| 5 | (United States) WeatherTech Raceway Laguna Seca | 26–27 September 2020 |
| 6 | (United States) Sebring International Raceway | 10–11 October 2020 |
| 7 | (Italy) Misano World Circuit | 5–6 March 2021 |
Cancelled due to the COVID-19 pandemic
| | (Canada) Circuit Gilles Villeneuve | 12–14 June 2020 |
| | (United Arab Emirates) Yas Marina Circuit | 4–7 November 2020 |

== Entry list ==
All teams and drivers used the Ferrari 488 Challenge Evo fitted with Pirelli tyres.

=== Trofeo Pirelli ===
| Team | No. | Driver | Class | Rounds |
|---|---|---|---|---|
| (United States) Ferrari of Palm Beach | 8 | (United States) Brian Davis | Pro-Am | 1–3 |
| (United States) Ferrari of Long Island | 9 | (United States) Alfred Caiola | Pro-Am | 1–3 |
| (United States) Ferrari of Long Island | 19 | (United States) Christopher Cagnazzi | Pro | 1–4 |
| (United States) Ferrari of Long Island | 22 | (Venezuela) Vicente Potolicchio | Pro | 6 |
| (United States) Ferrari of Long Island | 23 | (United States) John Megrue | Pro-Am | 1–2, 5 |
| (United States) Ferrari of Long Island | 28 | (United States) Joseph Rubbo | Pro | 1–5 |
| (United States) Ferrari of Long Island | 71 | (United States) Brian Kamineskey | Pro-Am | 3 |
| (Canada) Ferrari of Ontario | 13 | (Canada) Marc Muzzo | Pro-Am | 1 |
| (Canada) Ferrari of Ontario | 99 | (Canada) Barry Zekelman | Pro-Am | 1–2 |
| (United States) Ferrari of Newport Beach | 14 | (United States) Brent Holden | Pro-Am | 1–6 |
| (United States) Ferrari of Newport Beach | 67 | (United States) John Horejsi | Pro-Am | 1, 3 |
| (United States) Wide World Ferrari | 15 | (United States) Jason McCarthy | Pro-Am | 3–6 |
| (United States) Ferrari of Central Florida | 16 | (United States) Frank Selldorff | Pro-Am | 1–2 |
| (United States) Ferrari of Central Florida | 21 | (United States) Jordan Workman | Pro | 1–6 |
| (United States) Ferrari of Fort Lauderdale | 17 | (United States) Amir Kermani | Pro | 6 |
| (United States) Ferrari of Fort Lauderdale | 46 | (United States) Martin Burrowes | Pro | 2 |
| (United States) Ferrari of Fort Lauderdale | 51 | (Brazil) Claude Senhoreti | Pro-Am | 1, 6–7 |
| (United States) Boardwalk Ferrari | 25 | (United States) Ross Chouest | Pro | 1–6 |
| (United States) Boardwalk Ferrari | 61 | (United States) Jean-Claude Saada | Pro-Am | 1–6 |
| (United States) Ferrari Lake Forest | 30 | (United States) David Musial | Pro-Am | 1–6 |
| (United States) Continental AutoSports | 36 | (United States) Neil Gehani | Pro | 1 |
| (United States) Continental AutoSports | 72 | (United States) Aaron Weiss | Pro-Am | 2–4 |
| (United States) Ferrari Westlake | 63 | (United States) Cooper MacNeil | Pro | All |

=== Coppa Shell ===
| Team | No. | Driver | Class | Rounds |
|---|---|---|---|---|
| (United States) Wide World Ferrari | 100 | (United States) Anthony DeCarlo | Am | 2–6 |
| (United States) Wide World Ferrari | 108 | (United Kingdom) Mark Davies | Pro-Am | 2 |
| (United States) Wide World Ferrari | 115 | (United States) Jason McCarthy | Pro-Am | 1–2 |
| (United States) Ferrari of Fort Lauderdale | 103 | (United States) Travis Smith | Pro-Am | 2 |
| (United States) Foreign Cars Italia | 104 | (United States) Bubba Roof | Am | 3–4 |
| (United States) Foreign Cars Italia | 105 | (United States) Bradley Horstmann | Pro-Am | All |
| (United States) Foreign Cars Italia | 121 | (United States) Roy Carroll | Am | 2–6 |
| (United States) Ferrari of San Francisco | 107 | (United States) John Lennon | Am | 2–6 |
| (United States) Ferrari of San Francisco | 111 | (United States) Aaron Heck | Am | 1 |
| (United States) Ferrari of San Francisco | 157 | (United States) Jesus Mendoza | Am | 3–6 |
| (United States) Ferrari of Beverly Hills | 109 | (United Kingdom) Franck Ruimy | Am | 6 |
| (United States) Ferrari of Beverly Hills | 113 | (United States) Kirk Baerwaldt | Am | 3–6 |
| (United States) Ferrari of Beverly Hills | 127 | (United States) Lisa Clark | Am | 3–7 |
| (United States) Ferrari of Beverly Hills | 182 | (United States) Joe Sposato | Pro-Am | 5 |
| (United States) Ferrari of Beverly Hills | 188 | (United States) Michael Krekel | Am | 1–4 |
| (United States) Ferrari of Atlanta | 111 | (United States) Ronald Vogel | Pro-Am | 6 |
| (United States) Ferrari of Atlanta | 144 | (United States) Jim Booth | Pro-Am | 1–6 |
| (United States) Ferrari of Atlanta | 150 | (United States) Michael Watt | Am | 1–6 |
| (United States) Ferrari of Atlanta | 176 | (United States) Lance Cawley | Am | 1–4, 6 |
| (Canada) Ferrari of Ontario | 112 | (Canada) Mike Louli | Pro-Am | 2 |
| (Canada) Ferrari of Ontario | 139 | (Canada) John Cervini | Am | 1–2 |
| (United States) Ferrari of Seattle | 114 | (United States) Stephen Lawler | Am | 1 |
| (United States) Ferrari of Seattle | 132 | (United States) Yahn Bernier | Am | 1–6 |
| (United States) Ferrari of Seattle | 133 | (United States) Frank Chang | Am | 2 |
| (United States) Ferrari South Bay | 116 | (Germany) Lars Dahmann | Pro-Am | 4 |
| (United States) Ferrari South Bay | 153 | (United States) Neil Langberg | Am | 2–6 |
| (United States) Ferrari of Silicon Valley | 118 | (United States) George Zachary | Am | 3–6 |
| (United States) Ferrari of Houston | 119 | (United States) Christopher Aitken | Am | All |
| (United States) Ferrari of Houston | 162 | (United States) Michael Quattlebaum | Am | 1–2 |
| (United States) Ferrari of Detroit | 122 | (United States) Paul Keibler | Pro-Am | 4, 6 |
| (United States) Ferrari of Detroit | 128 | (United States) Robert Hertzberg | Am | 2–3, 5–6 |
| (United States) Ferrari of Detroit | 163 | (United States) Jay Schreibmann | Pro-Am | 1–6 |
| (United States) Ferrari Westlake | 126 | (United States) Eric Marston | Pro-Am | 5 |
| (United States) Ferrari Lake Forest | 130 | (United States) David Musial, Jr. | Am | 1–6 |
| (United States) Ferrari of Tampa Bay | 131 | (Mexico) Luis Perusquia | Am | 1–3, 5–6 |
| (United States) Ferrari of Palm Beach | 134 | (Puerto Rico) David Schmitt | Am | 4, 6 |
| (United States) Ferrari of San Diego | 138 | (United States) Kevin Millstein | Pro-Am | 2–7 |
| (United States) Ferrari of New England | 155 | (United States) Ian Campbell | Pro-Am | 2, 6 |
| (United States) Ferrari of Central Florida | 166 | (United States) Charles Whittall | Am | 2–6 |
| (United States) Ferrari of Central Florida | 199 | (United States) Justin Wetherill | Am | 1–6 |
| (United States) Ferrari of Denver | 169 | (United States) Todd Coleman | Am | 1–6 |
| (United States) Ferrari of Denver | 173 | (United States) Sureel Choksi | Am | 2–6 |
| (United States) Ferrari of Newport Beach | 178 | (United States) Alan Hegyi | Am | 1–2 |
| (United States) Ferrari of Long Island | 179 | (United States) Eileen Bildman | Am | All |
| (United States) Ron Tonkin Gran Turismo | 187 | (United States) Richard Baek | Pro-Am | 1, 5 |
| (United States) Boardwalk Ferrari | 189 | (United States) John Viskup, Jr. | Am | 4–6 |
| (United States) Miller Motor Cars | 193 | (Chile) Osvaldo Gaio | Pro-Am | 1–2 |

== Results and standings ==
=== Race results ===
| Round | Race | Circuit | Pole position | Fastest lap | Trofeo Pirelli Winners | Coppa Shell Winners |
|---|---|---|---|---|---|---|
| 1 | 1 | (United States) Daytona International Speedway | TP Pro: (United States) Cooper MacNeil; TP Pro-Am: (United States) John Megrue; CS Pro-Am: (United States) Jason McCarthy; CS Am: (United States) Aaron Heck | TP Pro: (United States) Cooper MacNeil; TP Pro-Am: (United States) David Musial; CS Pro-Am: (Chile) Osvaldo Gaio; CS Am: (United States) Michael Krekel | Pro: (United States) Cooper MacNeil; Ferrari Westlake; Pro-Am: (United States) John Megrue; Ferrari of Long Island | Pro-Am: (United States) Jason McCarthy; Wide World Ferrari; Am: (United States) Justin Wetherill; Ferrari of Central Florida |
| 1 | 2 | (United States) Daytona International Speedway | TP Pro: (United States) Cooper MacNeil; TP Pro-Am: (United States) John Megrue; CS Pro-Am: (United States) Jason McCarthy; CS Am: (Canada) John Cervini | TP Pro: (United States) Cooper MacNeil; TP Pro-Am: (United States) Jean-Claude Saada; CS Pro-Am: (United States) Jason McCarthy; CS Am: (United States) Michael Kerkel | Pro: (United States) Cooper MacNeil; Ferrari Westlake; Pro-Am: (United States) John Megrue; Ferrari of Long Island | Pro-Am: (United States) Richard Baek; Ron Tonkin Gran Turismo; Am: (United States) Justin Wetherill; Ferrari of Central Florida |
| 2 | 1 | (United States) Road Atlanta | TP Pro: (United States) Cooper MacNeil; TP Pro-Am: (United States) Jean-Claude Saada; CS Pro-Am: (United States) Jason McCarthy; CS Am: (United States) Justin Wetherill | TP Pro: (United States) Cooper MacNeil; TP Pro-Am: (Canada) Barry Zekelman; CS Pro-Am: (United States) Jason McCarthy; CS Am: (United States) John Lennon | Pro: (United States) Cooper MacNeil; Ferrari Westlake; Pro-Am: (United States) Jean-Claude Saada; Boardwalk Ferrari | Pro-Am: (United States) Jason McCarthy; Wide World Ferrari; Am: (United States) Justin Wetherill; Ferrari of Central Florida |
| 2 | 2 | (United States) Road Atlanta | TP Pro: (United States) Cooper MacNeil; TP Pro-Am: (United States) Brian Davis; CS Pro-Am: (United States) Jim Booth; CS Am: (United States) Michael Quattlebaum | TP Pro: (United States) Cooper MacNeil; TP Pro-Am: (United States) John Megrue; CS Pro-Am: (United States) Jason McCarthy; CS Am: (United States) David Musial, Jr. | Pro: (United States) Cooper MacNeil; Ferrari Westlake; Pro-Am: (United States) David Musial; Ferrari Lake Forest | Pro-Am: (United States) Jason McCarthy; Wide World Ferrari; Am: (United States) Michael Quattlebaum; Ferrari of Houston |
| 3 | 1 | (United States) Indianapolis Motor Speedway | TP Pro: (United States) Cooper MacNeil; TP Pro-Am: (United States) David Musial; CS Pro-Am: (United States) Kevin Millstein; CS Am: (United States) Todd Coleman | TP Pro: (United States) Cooper MacNeil; TP Pro-Am: (United States) David Musial; CS Pro-Am: (United States) Jim Booth; CS Am: (United States) Justin Wetherill | Pro: (United States) Cooper MacNeil; Ferrari Westlake; Pro-Am: (United States) David Musial; Ferrari Lake Forest | Pro-Am: (United States) Kevin Millstein; Ferrari of San Diego; Am: (United States) Justin Wetherill; Ferrari of Central Florida |
| 3 | 2 | (United States) Indianapolis Motor Speedway | TP Pro: (United States) Cooper MacNeil; TP Pro-Am: (United States) Jean-Claude Saada; CS Pro-Am: (United States) Jay Schreibmann; CS Am: (United States) Christopher Aitken | TP Pro: (United States) Cooper MacNeil; TP Pro-Am: (United States) Brian Davis; CS Pro-Am: (United States) Kevin Millstein; CS Am: (United States) Justin Wetherill | Pro: (United States) Cooper MacNeil; Ferrari Westlake; Pro-Am: (United States) Jean-Claude Saada; Boardwalk Ferrari | Pro-Am: (United States) Kevin Millstein; Ferrari of San Diego; Am: (United States) Sureel Choksi; Ferrari of Denver |
| 4 | 1 | (United States) Circuit of the Americas | TP Pro: (United States) Cooper MacNeil; TP Pro-Am: (United States) Jean-Claude Saada; CS Pro-Am: (United States) Bradley Horstmann; CS Am: (United States) Michael Watt | TP Pro: (United States) Cooper MacNeil; TP Pro-Am: (United States) Jean-Claude Saada; CS Pro-Am: (United States) Kevin Millstein; CS Am: (United States) Michael Watt | Pro: (United States) Cooper MacNeil; Ferrari Westlake; Pro-Am: (United States) Jean-Claude Saada; Boardwalk Ferrari | Pro-Am: (United States) Kevin Millstein; Ferrari of San Diego; Am: (United States) Michael Watt; Ferrari of Atlanta |
| 4 | 2 | (United States) Circuit of the Americas | TP Pro: (United States) Cooper MacNeil; TP Pro-Am: (United States) Jason McCarthy; CS Pro-Am: (United States) Kevin Millstein; CS Am: (United States) Sureel Choksi | TP Pro: (United States) Cooper MacNeil; TP Pro-Am: (United States) Jason McCarthy; CS Pro-Am: (United States) Kevin Millstein; CS Am: (United States) Sureel Choksi | Pro: (United States) Cooper MacNeil; Ferrari Westlake; Pro-Am: (United States) Jason McCarthy; Wide World Ferrari | Pro-Am: (United States) Kevin Millstein; Ferrari of San Diego; Am: (United States) Justin Wetherill; Ferrari of Central Florida |
| 5 | 1 | (United States) WeatherTech Raceway Laguna Seca | TP Pro: (United States) Cooper MacNeil; TP Pro-Am: (United States) Brent Holden; CS Pro-Am: (United States) Jim Booth; CS Am: (United States) David Musial, Jr. | TP Pro: (United States) Cooper MacNeil; TP Pro-Am: (United States) Brent Holden; CS Pro-Am: (United States) Jim Booth; CS Am: (United States) David Musial, Jr. | Pro: (United States) Ross Chouest; Boardwalk Ferrari; Pro-Am: (United States) Brent Holden; Ferrari of Newport Beach | Pro-Am: (United States) Jim Booth; Ferrari of Atlanta; Am: (United States) David Musial, Jr. Ferrari Lake Forest |
| 5 | 2 | (United States) WeatherTech Raceway Laguna Seca | TP Pro: (United States) Cooper MacNeil; TP Pro-Am: (United States) David Musial; CS Pro-Am: (United States) Bradley Horstmann; CS Am: (United States) David Musial, Jr. | TP Pro: (United States) Cooper MacNeil; TP Pro-Am: (United States) David Musial; CS Pro-Am: (United States) Bradley Horstmann; CS Am: (United States) David Musial, Jr. | Pro: (United States) Cooper MacNeil; Ferrari Westlake; Pro-Am: (United States) David Musial; Ferrari Lake Forest | Pro-Am: (United States) Bradley Horstmann; Foreign Cars Italia; Am: (United States) Michael Watt; Ferrari of Atlanta |
| 6 | 1 | (United States) Sebring International Raceway | TP Pro: (United States) Cooper MacNeil; TP Pro-Am: (United States) Brent Holden; CS Pro-Am: (United States) Jim Booth; CS Am: (United States) Christopher Aitken | TP Pro: (Venezuela) Vicente Potolicchio; TP Pro-Am: (Brazil) Claude Senhoreti; CS Pro-Am: (United States) Bradley Horstmann; CS Am: (United States) Justin Wetherill | Pro: (Venezuela) Vicente Potolicchio; Ferrari of Long Island; Pro-Am: (United States) Jason McCarthy; Wide World Ferrari | Pro-Am: (United States) Bradley Horstmann; Foreign Cars Italia; Am: (United States) Christopher Aitken; Ferrari of Houston |
| 6 | 2 | (United States) Sebring International Raceway | TP Pro: (United States) Cooper MacNeil; TP Pro-Am: (United States) Brent Holden; CS Pro-Am: (United States) Jay Schreibmann; CS Am: (United States) Justin Wetherill | TP Pro: (United States) Cooper MacNeil; TP Pro-Am: (United States) Jason McCarthy; CS Pro-Am: (United States) Jim Booth; CS Am: (United States) Michael Watt | Pro: (United States) Cooper MacNeil; Ferrari Westlake; Pro-Am: (United States) Jason McCarthy; Wide World Ferrari | Pro-Am: (United States) Bradley Horstmann; Foreign Cars Italia; Am: (United States) Justin Wetherill; Ferrari of Central Florida |
| 7 | 1 | (Italy) Misano World Circuit | TP Pro: (United States) Cooper MacNeil; TP Pro-Am: (Brazil) Claude Senhoreti; CS Pro-Am: (United States) Bradley Horstmann; CS Am: (United States) Christopher Aitken | TP Pro: (United States) Cooper MacNeil; TP Pro-Am: (Brazil) Claude Senhoreti; CS Pro-Am: (United States) Bradley Horstmann; CS Am: (United States) Christopher Aitken | Pro: (United States) Cooper MacNeil; Ferrari Westlake; Pro-Am: (Brazil) Claude Senhoreti; Ferrari of Fort Lauderdale | Pro-Am: (United States) Bradley Horstmann; Foreign Cars Italia; Am: (United States) Lisa Clark; Ferrari of Beverly Hills |
| 7 | 2 | (Italy) Misano World Circuit | TP Pro: (United States) Cooper MacNeil; TP Pro-Am: (Brazil) Claude Senhoreti; CS Pro-Am: (United States) Bradley Horstmann; CS Am: (United States) Lisa Clark | TP Pro: (United States) Cooper MacNeil; TP Pro-Am: (Brazil) Claude Senhoreti; CS Pro-Am: (United States) Bradley Horstmann; CS Am: (United States) Lisa Clark | Pro: (United States) Cooper MacNeil; Ferrari Westlake; Pro-Am: no winner | Pro-Am: (United States) Bradley Horstmann; Foreign Cars Italia; Am: (United States) Lisa Clark; Ferrari of Beverly Hills |

=== Championship standings ===
Points were awarded to the top ten classified finishers as follows:

| Race Position | 1st | 2nd | 3rd | 4th | 5th | 6th | 7th | 8th or lower | Pole | FLap |
| Points | 15 | 12 | 10 | 8 | 6 | 4 | 2 | 1 | 1 | 1 |

Trofeo Pirelli

| Pos. | Driver | (United States) DAY | | (United States) ATL | | (United States) IMS | | (United States) AUS | | (United States) LGS | | (United States) SEB | | (Italy) MIS | | Points |
| Pos. | Driver | R1 | R2 | R1 | R2 | R1 | R2 | R1 | R2 | R1 | R2 | R1 | R2 | R1 | R2 | Points |
|---|---|---|---|---|---|---|---|---|---|---|---|---|---|---|---|---|
Pro Class
| 1 | (United States) Cooper MacNeil | 1 | 1 | 1 | 1 | 1 | 1 | 1 | 1 | 4 | 1 | 2 | 1 | 1 | 1 | 227 |
| 2 | (United States) Ross Chouest | 3 | 3 | 4 | 3 | 2 | Ret | 2 | 2 | 1 | 3 | 3 | 3 | | | 125 |
| 3 | (United States) Jordan Workman | Ret | 4 | 5 | 5 | 3 | 2 | 4 | 4 | 2 | 2 | 5 | 4 | | | 102 |
| 4 | (United States) Joseph Rubbo | 2 | 2 | 3 | Ret | Ret | 4 | 3 | 3 | 3 | 4 | | | | | 92 |
| 5 | (United States) Christopher Cagnazzi | 4 | Ret | 6 | 4 | Ret | 3 | DNS | DNS | | | | | | | 40 |
| 6 | (Venezuela) Vicente Potolicchio | | | | | | | | | | | 1 | 2 | | | 28 |
| 7 | (United States) Martin Burrowes | | | 2 | 2 | | | | | | | | | | | 24 |
| 8 | (United States) Amir Kermani | | | | | | | | | | | 4 | 5 | | | 14 |
| 9 | (United States) Neil Gehani | Ret | 5 | | | | | | | | | | | | | 10 |
Pro-Am Class
| 1 | (United States) David Musial | 2 | 3 | 5 | 1 | 1 | 3 | 4 | 4 | 2 | 1 | 4 | 3 | | | 134 |
| 2 | (United States) Jean-Claude Saada | Ret | 2 | 1 | 4 | 2 | 1 | 1 | 2 | 3 | Ret | 3 | Ret | | | 127 |
| 3 | (United States) Jason McCarthy | | | | | Ret | Ret | 3 | 1 | 4 | 4 | 1 | 1 | | | 118 |
| 4 | (United States) Brent Holden | Ret | 4 | 6 | 7 | 4 | 6 | 2 | 3 | 1 | 2 | 5 | 2 | | | 98 |
| 5 | (Brazil) Claude Senhoreti | 6 | Ret | | | | | | | | | 2 | 4 | 1 | Ret | 60 |
| = | (United States) John Megrue | 1 | 1 | Ret | 3 | | | | | Ret | 3 | | | | | 60 |
| 7 | (United States) Aaron Weiss | | | 4 | 6 | 3 | 2 | Ret | 5 | | | | | | | 46 |
| 8 | (United States) Brian Davis | Ret | 9 | 2 | 2 | 6 | 5 | | | | | | | | | 39 |
| 9 | (Canada) Barry Zekelman | 3 | Ret | 3 | 5 | | | | | | | | | | | 28 |
| 10 | (United States) John Horejsi | 4 | 6 | | | 5 | 7 | | | | | | | | | 20 |
| 11 | (United States) Alfred Caiola | Ret | 5 | 7 | Ret | Ret | 4 | | | | | | | | | 19 |
| 12 | (United States) Frank Selldorff | 5 | 8 | 8 | 8 | | | | | | | | | | | 9 |
| 13 | (Canada) Marc Muzzo | Ret | 7 | | | | | | | | | | | | | 3 |
| 14 | (United States) Brian Kaminskey | | | | | Ret | DNS | | | | | | | | | 2 |

Coppa Shell

| Pos. | Driver | (United States) DAY | | (United States) ATL | | (United States) IMS | | (United States) AUS | | (United States) LGS | | (United States) SEB | | (Italy) MIS | | Points |
| Pos. | Driver | R1 | R2 | R1 | R2 | R1 | R2 | R1 | R2 | R1 | R2 | R1 | R2 | R1 | R2 | Points |
|---|---|---|---|---|---|---|---|---|---|---|---|---|---|---|---|---|
Pro-Am Class
| 1 | (United States) Bradley Horstmann | Ret | 2 | 5 | Ret | 2 | 4 | 2 | 3 | 3 | 1 | 1 | 1 | 1 | 1 | 158 |
| 2 | (United States) Kevin Millstein | | | 7 | 3 | 1 | 1 | 1 | 1 | 2 | 4 | 4 | 3 | Ret | 2 | 139 |
| 3 | (United States) Jim Booth | 3 | 6 | Ret | 2 | Ret | 2 | 3 | 2 | 1 | 3 | 2 | 5 | | | 118 |
| 4 | (United States) Jay Schreibmann | 5 | 3 | 2 | 8 | 3 | 3 | 5 | 5 | 4 | 6 | 5 | 2 | | | 93 |
| 5 | (Chile) Osvaldo Gaio | 2 | 4 | 3 | 4 | | | | | | | | | | | 39 |
| 6 | (United States) Richard Baek | 4 | 1 | | | | | | | 6 | Ret | | | | | 29 |
| 7 | (United States) Ian Campbell | | | 6 | 5 | | | | | | | 3 | 4 | | | 28 |
| 8 | (United States) Eric Marston | | | | | | | | | 5 | 2 | | | | | 18 |
| 9 | (Germany) Lars Dahmann | | | | | | | 4 | 4 | | | | | | | 16 |
| = | (United States) Paul Keibler | | | | | | | 6 | 6 | | | 6 | 6 | | | 16 |
| 11 | (Canada) Mike Louli | | | 4 | 6 | | | | | | | | | | | 12 |
| 12 | (United States) Joe Sposato | | | | | | | | | 7 | 5 | | | | | 8 |
| 13 | (United Kingdom) Mark Davies | | | Ret | 7 | | | | | | | | | | | 3 |
| NC | (United States) Ronald Vogel | | | | | | | | | | | DNS | DNS | | | 0 |
| = | (United States) Travis Smith | | | DNS | DNS | | | | | | | | | | | 0 |
| = | (United States) Jason McCarthy‡ | 1 | 5 | 1 | 1 | | | | | | | | | | | 0 |
Am Class
| 1 | (United States) Justin Wetherill | 1 | 1 | 1 | 6 | 1 | Ret | 2 | 1 | 2 | 3 | 2 | 1 | | | 146 |
| 2 | (United States) Christopher Aitken | 2 | 6 | 12 | 4 | 5 | 6 | 3 | 4 | 15 | 4 | 1 | 2 | 3 | DNS | 105 |
| 3 | (United States) David Musial, Jr. | 5 | 3 | 4 | 20 | 3 | 3 | Ret | 6 | 1 | 2 | 4 | 7 | | | 97 |
| 4 | (United States) Michael Watt | 9 | 4 | 3 | 5 | DNS | Ret | 1 | 2 | 4 | 1 | 3 | 5 | | | 95 |
| 5 | (United States) Todd Coleman | Ret | 8 | 9 | 2 | 13 | 4 | 5 | 5 | 3 | 9 | 6 | 3 | | | 65 |
| 6 | (United States) Lisa Clark | | | | | Ret | 9 | 15 | 8 | 7 | 6 | 12 | 13 | 1 | 1 | 44 |
| 7 | (United States) John Lennon | | | 2 | 12 | 15 | 2 | 6 | 10 | 6 | 5 | DNS | DNS | | | 42 |
| 8 | (United States) Eileen Bildman | 12 | 12 | 21 | 19 | 8 | 13 | 17 | 19 | DNS | DNS | DNS | Ret | 2 | 2 | 35 |
| 9 | (United States) Sureel Choksi | | | 10 | 9 | 9 | 1 | 7 | 3 | 19 | 7 | 7 | 4 | | | 34 |
| 10 | (United States) Kirk Baerwaldt | | | | | 16 | 7 | 4 | 7 | 5 | 8 | 5 | 6 | | | 30 |
| 11 | (United States) Michael Quattlebaum | 6 | 5 | 7 | 1 | | | | | | | | | | | 28 |
| = | (United States) Yahn Bernier | 10 | 13 | 5 | 8 | 2 | Ret | 14 | 13 | 12 | 11 | 16 | 9 | | | 28 |
| 13 | (Canada) John Cervini | 8 | 2 | 11 | 3 | | | | | | | | | | | 25 |
| 14 | (United States) Charles Whittall | | | 13 | Ret | 4 | Ret | Ret | 9 | 8 | 14 | 8 | Ret | | | 17 |
| 15 | (United States) Roy Carroll | | | 18 | 11 | 14 | 5 | DNS | DNS | 11 | 15 | 10 | 10 | | | 15 |
| 16 | (Mexico) Luis Perusquia | 13 | 14 | 17 | 15 | 6 | Ret | | | 9 | 13 | 15 | 12 | | | 13 |
| 17 | (United States) Stephen Lawler | 3 | 7 | | | | | | | | | | | | | 12 |
| = | (United States) Michael Krekel | 7 | 15 | 8 | 7 | Ret | 8 | 8 | 14 | | | | | | | 12 |
| 19 | (United States) Anthony DeCarlo | | | 14 | 14 | 7 | 12 | 10 | 12 | 16 | 12 | 13 | 11 | | | 11 |
| 20 | (United States) Lance Cawley | 11 | 10 | 15 | 13 | Ret | 11 | 9 | 15 | | | 11 | 14 | | | 10 |
| = | (United States) Neil Langberg | | | 20 | 17 | 17 | Ret | 16 | 17 | 13 | 18 | Ret | 15 | | | 10 |
| 22 | (United States) Aaron Heck | 4 | 9 | | | | | | | | | | | | | 9 |
| 23 | (United States) George Zachary | | | | | 18 | 15 | Ret | 18 | 18 | 16 | 17 | 16 | | | 8 |
| 24 | (United States) Robert Hertzberg | | | 19 | 18 | 10 | 14 | | | 17 | 19 | Ret | DNS | | | 7 |
| = | (United States) Jesus Mendoza | | | | | 11 | Ret | 18 | 20 | 14 | 17 | 14 | DNS | | | 7 |
| 26 | (United States) John Viskup, Jr. | | | | | | | 12 | 11 | 10 | 10 | 9 | 8 | | | 6 |
| 27 | (United States) Frank Chang | | | 6 | 10 | | | | | | | | | | | 5 |
| 28 | (United States) Bubba Roof | | | | | 12 | 10 | 13 | 16 | | | | | | | 4 |
| = | (United States) Alan Hegyi | 14 | 11 | 16 | 16 | | | | | | | | | | | 4 |
| 30 | (Puerto Rico) David Schmitt | | | | | | | 11 | Ret | | | DNS | DNS | | | 2 |
| NC | (United Kingdom) Franck Ruimy | | | | | | | | | | | DNS | DNS | | | 0 |

‡ Driver ineligible for championship points.
