= 2020 Ferrari Challenge UK =

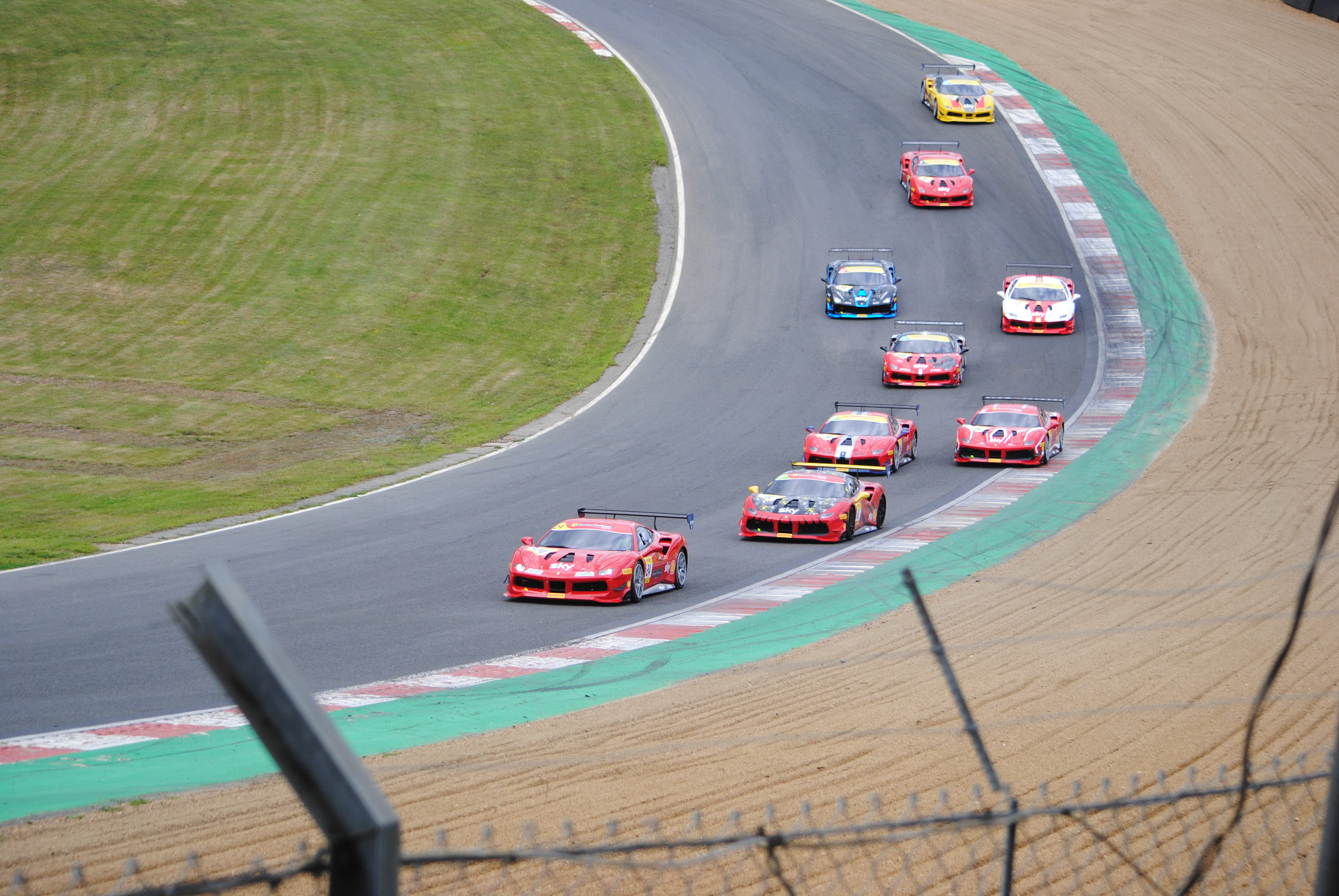
The start of the second race at Brands Hatch.

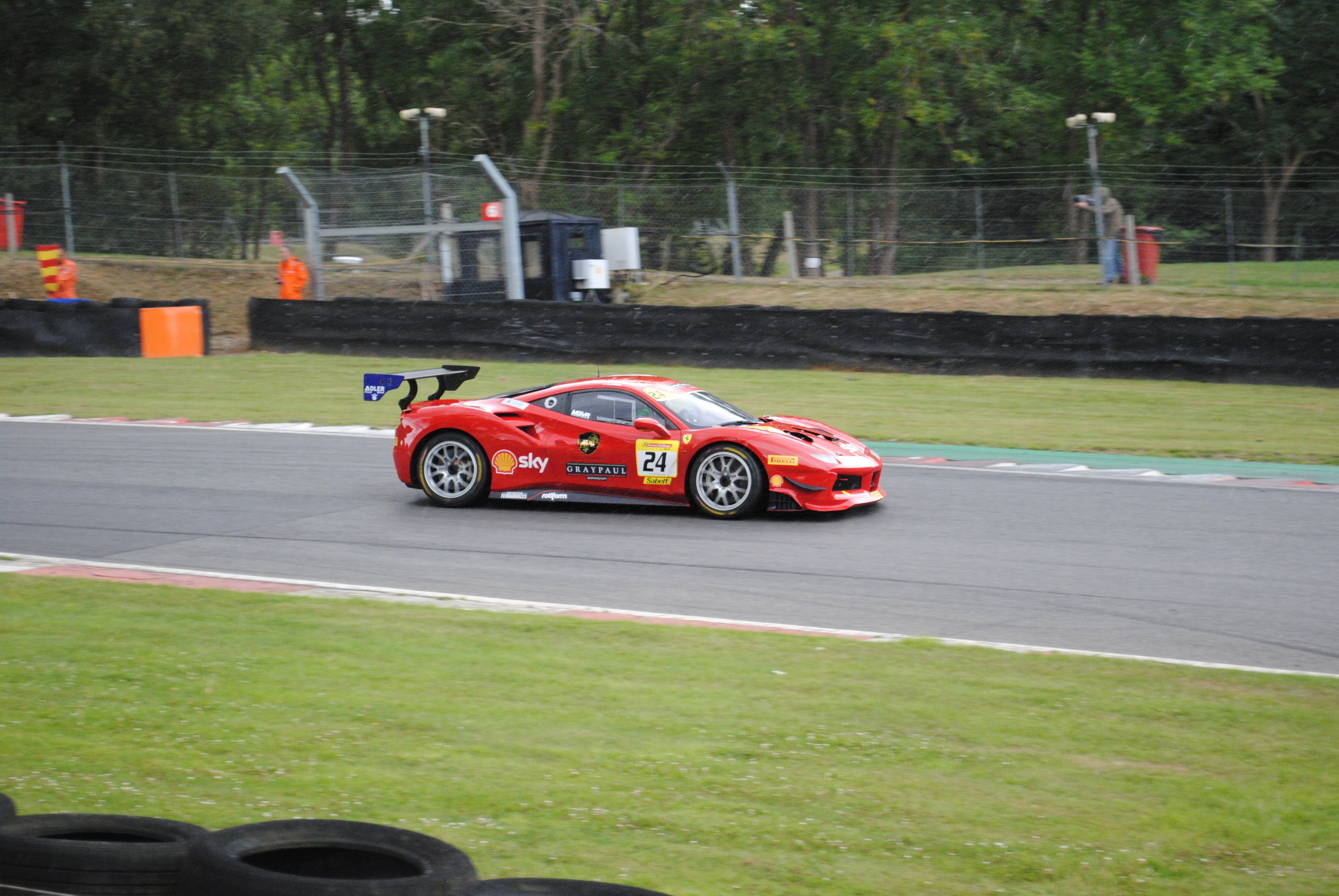
Lucky Khera, the Trofeo Pirelli champion.

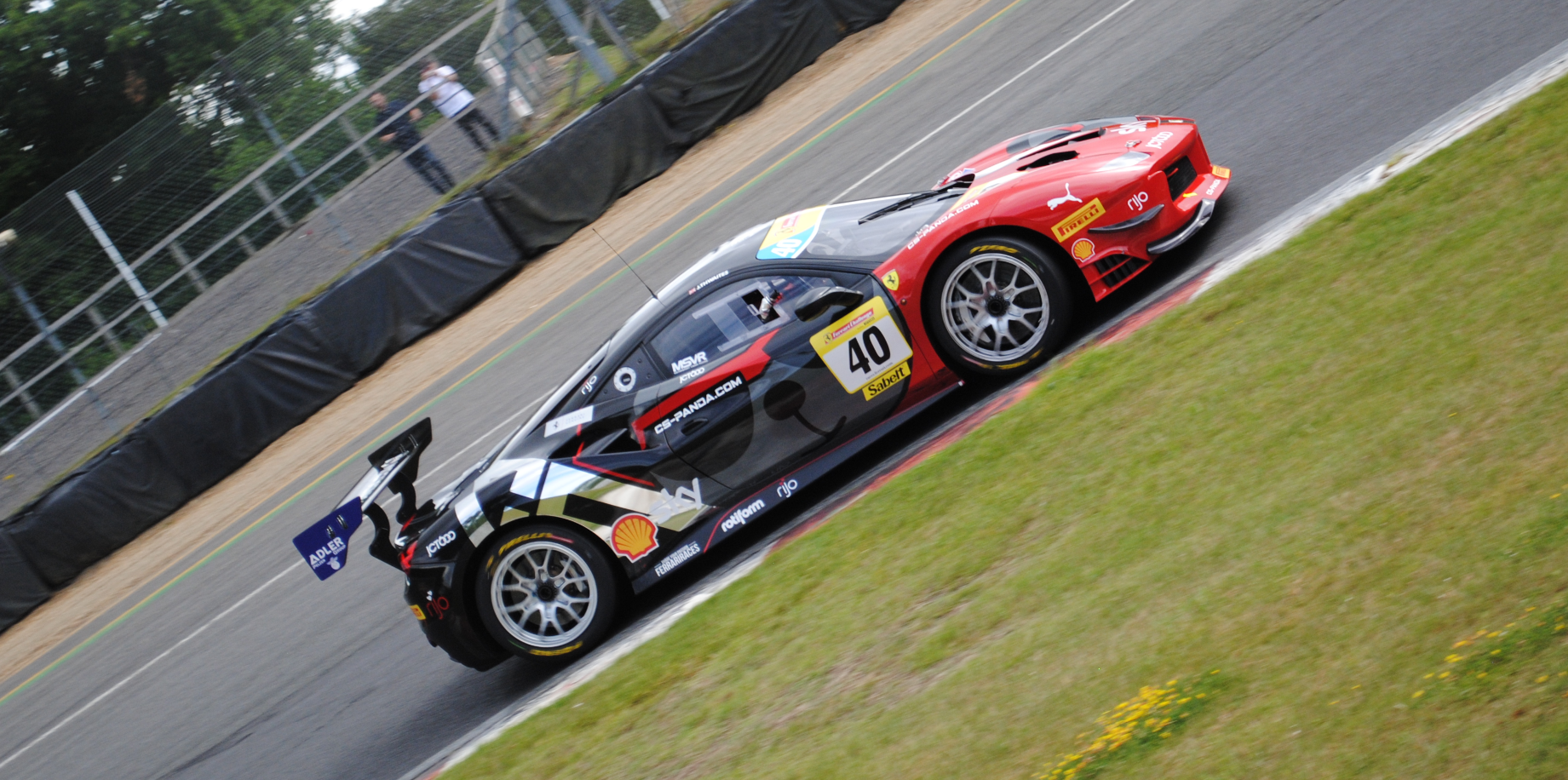
Jamie Thwaites, the Coppa Shell champion.

The 2020 Ferrari Challenge UK was the second season of Ferrari Challenge UK. The season started at Brands Hatch on 25 July and ended on 10 October at Snetterton. Lucky Khera won the Trofeo Pirelli title and Jamie Thwaites was the Coppa Shell champion.

== Calendar ==
Rnd.	Circuit	Dates
1	Brands Hatch Indy (R1); Grand Prix (R2)	25–26 July 2020
2	Donington Park National	29–30 August 2020
3	Silverstone Circuit	19–20 September 2020
4	Snetterton 300	9–10 October 2020
NC	Misano World Circuit	5–6 March 2021

== Entry list ==
All teams and drivers used the Ferrari 488 Challenge fitted with Pirelli tyres.

Team	No.	Driver	Class	Rounds
Graypaul Birmingham	1	(United Kingdom) Alex Moss	Shell	All
Graypaul Birmingham	24	(United Kingdom) Lucky Khera	Pirelli	All, NC
Graypaul Birmingham	27	(United Kingdom) Martin Smith	Pirelli	4
Graypaul Birmingham	77	(United Kingdom) Paul Simmerson	Shell	All
Stratstone Manchester	6	(United Kingdom) Paul Hogarth	Pirelli	All
Dick Lovett Swindon	9	(United Kingdom) Paul Stevens	Shell	1–2
H.R. Owen London	16	(Netherlands) Hans Sikkens	Pirelli	All, NC
Meridien Modena	19	(United Kingdom) Graham de Zille	Shell	1–2
JCT600 Brooklands Leeds	20	(United Kingdom) Paul Rogers	Shell	All, NC
JCT600 Brooklands Leeds	40	(United Kingdom) Jamie Thwaites	Shell	All
Graypaul Nottingham	22	(United Kingdom) Gary Redman	Shell	3

== Results and standings ==
=== Race results ===
Round	Race	Circuit	Pole position	Fastest lap	Trofeo Pirelli Winners	Coppa Shell Winners
1	1	Brands Hatch	TP: (United Kingdom) Lucky Khera; CS: (United Kingdom) Graham de Zille	TP: (United Kingdom) Lucky Khera; CS: (United Kingdom) Graham de Zille	(United Kingdom) Lucky Khera	(United Kingdom) Graham de Zille
1	2	Brands Hatch	TP: (United Kingdom) Lucky Khera; CS: (United Kingdom) Graham de Zille	TP: (United Kingdom) Paul Hogarth; CS: (United Kingdom) Graham de Zille	(United Kingdom) Lucky Khera	(United Kingdom) Graham de Zille
2	3	Donington Park National	TP: (United Kingdom) Lucky Khera; CS: (United Kingdom) Graham de Zille	TP: (United Kingdom) Lucky Khera; CS: (United Kingdom) Graham de Zille	(United Kingdom) Lucky Khera	(United Kingdom) Graham de Zille
2	4	Donington Park National	TP: (United Kingdom) Lucky Khera; CS: (United Kingdom) Graham de Zille	TP: (United Kingdom) Lucky Khera; CS: (United Kingdom) Graham de Zille	(United Kingdom) Lucky Khera	(United Kingdom) Graham de Zille
3	5	Silverstone Circuit	TP: (United Kingdom) Lucky Khera; CS: (United Kingdom) Jamie Thwaites	TP: (United Kingdom) Lucky Khera; CS: (United Kingdom) Jamie Thwaites	(United Kingdom) Lucky Khera	(United Kingdom) Jamie Thwaites
3	6	Silverstone Circuit	TP: (Netherlands) Hans Sikkens; CS: (United Kingdom) Jamie Thwaites	TP: (United Kingdom) Lucky Khera; CS: (United Kingdom) Jamie Thwaites	(United Kingdom) Lucky Khera	(United Kingdom) Jamie Thwaites
4	7	Snetterton 300	TP: (United Kingdom) Lucky Khera; CS: (United Kingdom) Paul Rogers	TP: (United Kingdom) Lucky Khera; CS: (United Kingdom) Jamie Thwaites	(United Kingdom) Lucky Khera	(United Kingdom) Jamie Thwaites
4	8	Snetterton 300	TP: (United Kingdom) Paul Hogarth; CS: (United Kingdom) Alex Moss	TP: (United Kingdom) Lucky Khera; CS: (United Kingdom) Alex Moss	(United Kingdom) Lucky Khera	(United Kingdom) Jamie Thwaites

=== Championship standings ===
Points were awarded to the top ten classified finishers as follows:

Race Position	1st	2nd	3rd	4th	5th	6th	7th	8th or lower	Pole	FLap	Entry
Points	15	12	10	8	6	4	2	1	1	1	1

Pos.	Driver	BRH		DON		SIL		SNE		Points
Pos.	Driver	R1	R2	R1	R2	R1	R2	R1	R2	Points
Trofeo Pirelli
1	(United Kingdom) Lucky Khera	1	1	1	1	1	1	1	1	137
2	(Netherlands) Hans Sikkens	3	5	4	Ret	2	2	4	2	81
3	(United Kingdom) Paul Hogarth	Ret	2	2	Ret	3	3	2	3	72
4	(United Kingdom) Martin Smith							3	8	19
Coppa Shell
1	(United Kingdom) Jamie Thwaites	4	4	5	Ret	4	4	5	4	105
2	(United Kingdom) Alex Moss	5	7	Ret	4	5	5	6	5	81
3	(United Kingdom) Paul Simmerson	6	6	7	3	6	6	7	7	80
4	(United Kingdom) Graham de Zille	2	3	3	2					70
5	(United Kingdom) Paul Rogers	7	8	6	5	7	7	8	6	70
6	(United Kingdom) Paul Stevens	8	Ret	8	6					18
7	(United Kingdom) Gary Redman					8	8			13
