= 2021 Ferrari Challenge Asia-Pacific =

The 2021 Ferrari Challenge Asia-Pacific was the 10th season of Ferrari Challenge competition in the Asia-Pacific region. The season consists of three rounds, starting at the Mugello Circuit on November 16 and concluded at the Dubai Autodrome on January 14 2022.

== Calendar ==
Rnd.	Circuit	Dates	Supporting
1	(Italy) Mugello Circuit	20–21 November 2021	Finali Mondiali
2	(United Arab Emirates) Yas Marina Circuit	6–8 January 2022	Gulf 12 Hours
3	(United Arab Emirates) Dubai Autodrome	12–14 January 2022	2022 Dubai 24 Hour

== Entry list ==
All teams and drivers used the Ferrari 488 Challenge Evo fitted with Pirelli tyres.

Team	No.	Driver	Class	Rounds
(France) SF Côte D'Azur Cannes - IB Fast	2	(France) Ange Barde	PAM	All
(Denmark) Formula Racing	4	(Denmark) Christian Brunsborg	PAM	All
(Denmark) Formula Racing	60	(Denmark) Johnny Laursen	PAM	2
(Denmark) Formula Racing	89	(Denmark) Claus Zibrandsten	PAM	2–3
(Denmark) Formula Racing	121	(Denmark) Peter Christensen	SAM	1–2
(United Kingdom) HR Owen	16	(Netherlands) Han Sikkens	PAM	1, 3
(United Arab Emirates) Al Tayer Motors	104	(United Arab Emirates) Andrew Gilbert	SAM	2–3
(United Arab Emirates) Al Tayer Motors	107	(United Arab Emirates) Mohamed Al Qamzi	SAM	2–3
(United Arab Emirates) Al Tayer Motors	156	(Saudi Arabia) Abdulrahman Addas	SAM	2
(United Arab Emirates) Al Tayer Motors	157	(Lebanon) Tani Hanna	S	3
(United Arab Emirates) Al Tayer Motors	173	(Poland) Roman Ziemian	S	2–3
(South Korea) Forza Motor Korea	111	(South Korea) Andrew Moon	S	2–3
(South Korea) Forza Motor Korea	125	(South Korea) Jae Sung Park	S	All
(Hong Kong) Blackbird Concessionaries	113	(Singapore) Kirk Baerwaldt	SAM	All
(United States) Ferrari of Houston	123	(United States) Brett Jacobson	SAM	All
(United States) Ferrari of Beverly Hills	127	(United States) Lisa Clark	SAM	All
(Czech Republic) Scuderia Praha	163	(Czech Republic) Renè Matera	SAM	All
(Austria) Baron Motorsport	188	(Austria) Ernst Kirchmayr	S	1, 3

Icon	Class
P	Trofeo Pirelli
PAM	Trofeo Pirelli Am
S	Coppa Shell
SAM	Copa Shell Am

== Results and standings ==
=== Race results ===
Round	Race	Circuit	Pole position Trofeo Pirelli	Pole position Coppa Shell	Trofeo Pirelli Winners	Trofeo Pirreli Am Winners	Coppa Shell Winners	Coppa Shell Am Winners
1	1	(Italy) Mugello Circuit	(Denmark) Formula Racing	(Austria) Baron Motorsport	No Entries	(Denmark) Formula Racing	(Austria) Baron Motorsport	(United States) Ferrari of Houston
1	1	(Italy) Mugello Circuit	(Denmark) Christian Brunsborg	(Austria) Enrst Kirchmayr	No Entries	(Denmark) Christian Brunsborg	(Austria) Enrst Kirchmayr	(United States) Brett Jacobson
1	2	(Italy) Mugello Circuit	(Denmark) Formula Racing	(Austria) Baron Motorsport	No Entries	(France) SF Côte D'Azur Cannes - IB Fast	(Austria) Baron Motorsport	(United States) Ferrari of Houston
1	2	(Italy) Mugello Circuit	(Denmark) Christian Brunsborg	(Austria) Enrst Kirchmayr	No Entries	(France) Ange Barde	(Austria) Enrst Kirchmayr	(United States) Brett Jacobson
2	1	(United Arab Emirates) Yas Marina Circuit	(Denmark) Formula Racing	(United Arab Emirates) Al Tayer Motors	No Entries	(Denmark) Formula Racing	(United Arab Emirates) Al Tayer Motors	(Czech Republic) Scuderia Praha
2	1	(United Arab Emirates) Yas Marina Circuit	(Denmark) Christian Brunsborg	(Poland) Roman Ziemian	No Entries	(Denmark) Christian Brunsborg	(Poland) Roman Ziemian	(Czech Republic) Renè Matera
2	2	(United Arab Emirates) Yas Marina Circuit	(France) SF Côte D'Azur Cannes - IB Fast	(South Korea) Forza Motor Korea	No Entries	(Denmark) Formula Racing	(United Arab Emirates) Al Tayer Motors	(Hong Kong) Blackbird Concessionaries
2	2	(United Arab Emirates) Yas Marina Circuit	(France) Ange Barde	(South Korea) Jae Sung Park	No Entries	(Denmark) Christian Brunsborg	(Poland) Roman Ziemian	(Singapore) Kirk Baerwaldt
2	3	(United Arab Emirates) Yas Marina Circuit	(Denmark) Formula Racing	(South Korea) Forza Motor Korea	No Entries	(Denmark) Formula Racing	(United Arab Emirates) Al Tayer Motors	(Czech Republic) Scuderia Praha
2	3	(United Arab Emirates) Yas Marina Circuit	(Denmark) Christian Brunsborg	(South Korea) Jae Sung Park	No Entries	(Denmark) Christian Brunsborg	(Poland) Roman Ziemian	(Czech Republic) Renè Matera
3	1	(United Arab Emirates) Dubai Autodrome	(Denmark) Formula Racing	(United Arab Emirates) Al Tayer Motors	No Entries	(France) SF Côte D'Azur Cannes - IB Fast	(United Arab Emirates) Al Tayer Motors	(Hong Kong) Blackbird Concessionaries
3	1	(United Arab Emirates) Dubai Autodrome	(Denmark) Claus Zibrandsten	(Lebanon) Tani Hanna	No Entries	(France) Ange Barde	(Poland) Roman Ziemian	(Singapore) Kirk Baerwaldt
3	2	(United Arab Emirates) Dubai Autodrome	(Denmark) Formula Racing	(United Arab Emirates) Al Tayer Motors	No Entries			
3	2	(United Arab Emirates) Dubai Autodrome	(Denmark) Christian Brunsborg	(Poland) Roman Ziemian	No Entries			
3	3	(United Arab Emirates) Dubai Autodrome			No Entries			
Results:
