= 2025 Ferrari Challenge Australasia =

Motor racing championship

The 2025 Ferrari Challenge Australasia was the first season of Ferrari Challenge Australasia. The season consisted of five rounds, starting at Mount Panorama Circuit on 31 January and ending at The Bend Motorsport Park on 7 September. It was open for Ferrari 296 Challenge and Ferrari 488 Challenge cars with the competition being divided between three classes - Trofeo Pirelli, Coppa Shell and the 488 Challenge.

The Trofeo Pirelli and Copa Shell championships were won by Antoine Gittany and Enzo Cheng respectively in dominant fashion. Michel Stephan meanwhile emerged victorious in the 488 Challenge.

== Calendar ==
Rd	Circuit	City	Date	Supporting
1	(New South Wales) Mount Panorama Circuit	Bathurst, New South Wales	31 Jan–1 Feb	Bathurst 12 Hour
2	(Victoria (state)) Phillip Island Grand Prix Circuit	Phillip Island, Victoria	4–6 April	GT World Challenge Australia; GT4 Australia Series; Porsche Sprint Challenge Australia; Radical Cup Australia
3	(New South Wales) Sydney Motorsport Park	Eastern Creek, New South Wales	2–4 May	GT World Challenge Australia; GT4 Australia Series; Porsche Sprint Challenge Australia; Radical Cup Australia
4	(New South Wales) Sydney Motorsport Park	Eastern Creek, New South Wales	28–29 June	Stand-alone round
5	(South Australia) The Bend Motorsport Park	Tailem Bend, South Australia	5–7 September	GT World Challenge Australia; GT4 Australia Series; Porsche Sprint Challenge Australia; Radical Cup Australia

== Entries ==
Car	Entrant	No.	Driver Name	Class	Rounds
296 Challenge	MC Corsa	1	(Australia) Mark Hudders	P	All
296 Challenge	MC Corsa	7	(Australia) Jim Pollicina	P	All
296 Challenge	MC Corsa	13	(Australia) Paul Van Loenhout	P	4
296 Challenge	MC Corsa	22	(Australia) Antoine Gittany	P	1–3, 5
296 Challenge	MC Corsa	105	(Japan) Masahiro Taguchi	PA	All
296 Challenge	MC Corsa	111	(Australia) Tony Baildon	PA	All
296 Challenge	MC Corsa	117	(Australia) Enzo Cheng	PA	All
296 Challenge	MC Corsa	127	(Australia) David Trewern	PA	All
296 Challenge	MC Corsa	170	(Australia) David Frish	PA	All
296 Challenge	MC Corsa	181	(Japan) Norikazu Shibata	PA	3
296 Challenge	Zagame Autosport	23	(Australia) Cameron Campbell	P	All
296 Challenge	Zagame Autosport	44	(Australia) Rod Wilson	P	1, 5
296 Challenge	Zagame Autosport	99	(Austria) Ernst Kirchmayr	P	1
296 Challenge	Zagame Autosport	100	(Australia) Aemel Nordin	PA	4–5
296 Challenge	Zagame Autosport	109	(Australia) Nigel Hunt	PA	2
296 Challenge	Zagame Autosport	164	(New Zealand) Michael Walker	PA	4
488 Challenge Evo	MC Corsa	212	(Australia) Michel Stephan	488	All
488 Challenge Evo	MC Corsa	233	(Australia) Manu Nithianathra	488	1
488 Challenge Evo	MC Corsa	275	(Japan) "Baby Kei"	488	1, 3–5
488 Challenge Evo	MC Corsa	277	(Australia) Jarrod Ferrari	488	1–2, 4
488 Challenge Evo	MC Corsa	277	(Australia) Paul Brockbank	488	5
488 Challenge Evo	Zagame Autosport	215	(China) Chris Huang	488	1

Class	Description
P	Pirelli Pro
PA	Shell Pro-Am
488	488 Challenge

== Results and standings ==
=== Results ===
==== Pro ====
Rd	Race	Circuit	Pole position	Fastest lap	Race winner	Winning team	Results
1	1	(New South Wales) Mount Panorama Circuit	(Australia) Antoine Gittany	(Austria) Ernst Kirchmayr	(Australia) Antoine Gittany	MC Corsa	Report
1	2	(New South Wales) Mount Panorama Circuit	(Australia) Antoine Gittany	(Australia) Antoine Gittany	(Australia) Antoine Gittany	MC Corsa	Report
2	3	(Victoria (state)) Phillip Island Grand Prix Circuit	(Australia) Antoine Gittany	(Australia) Antoine Gittany	(Australia) Antoine Gittany	MC Corsa	Report
2	4	(Victoria (state)) Phillip Island Grand Prix Circuit	(Australia) Antoine Gittany	(Australia) Antoine Gittany	(Australia) Antoine Gittany	MC Corsa	Report
3	5	(New South Wales) Sydney Motorsport Park	(Australia) Antoine Gittany	(Australia) Antoine Gittany	(Australia) Antoine Gittany	MC Corsa	Report
3	6	(New South Wales) Sydney Motorsport Park	(Australia) Antoine Gittany	(Australia) Antoine Gittany	(Australia) Antoine Gittany	MC Corsa	Report
4	7	(New South Wales) Sydney Motorsport Park	(Australia) Cameron Campbell	(Australia) Jim Pollicina	(Australia) Jim Pollicina	MC Corsa	
4	8	(New South Wales) Sydney Motorsport Park	(Australia) Cameron Campbell	(Australia) Jim Pollicina	(Australia) Jim Pollicina	MC Corsa	
5	9	(South Australia) The Bend Motorsport Park	(Australia) Antoine Gittany	(Australia) Antoine Gittany	(Australia) Antoine Gittany	MC Corsa	
5	10	(South Australia) The Bend Motorsport Park	(Australia) Antoine Gittany	(Australia) Antoine Gittany	(Australia) Antoine Gittany	MC Corsa	

==== Pro-Am ====
Rd	Race	Circuit	Pole position	Fastest lap	Race winner	Winning team	Results
1	1	(New South Wales) Mount Panorama Circuit	(Australia) David Trewern	(Australia) David Trewern	(Australia) David Trewern	MC Corsa	Report
1	2	(New South Wales) Mount Panorama Circuit	(Australia) Enzo Cheng	(Australia) Enzo Cheng	(Australia) Enzo Cheng	MC Corsa	Report
2	3	(Victoria (state)) Phillip Island Grand Prix Circuit	(Australia) Enzo Cheng	(Australia) David Trewern	(Australia) Enzo Cheng	MC Corsa	Report
2	4	(Victoria (state)) Phillip Island Grand Prix Circuit	(Australia) Enzo Cheng	(Australia) Enzo Cheng	(Australia) Enzo Cheng	MC Corsa	Report
3	5	(New South Wales) Sydney Motorsport Park	(Australia) Enzo Cheng	(Australia) Enzo Cheng	(Australia) Enzo Cheng	MC Corsa	Report
3	6	(New South Wales) Sydney Motorsport Park	(Australia) Enzo Cheng	(Australia) Enzo Cheng	(Australia) Enzo Cheng	MC Corsa	Report
4	7	(New South Wales) Sydney Motorsport Park	(Australia) Enzo Cheng	(Australia) Enzo Cheng	(Australia) Enzo Cheng	MC Corsa	
4	8	(New South Wales) Sydney Motorsport Park	(Australia) Enzo Cheng	(Australia) Enzo Cheng	(Australia) Enzo Cheng	MC Corsa	
5	9	(South Australia) The Bend Motorsport Park	(Australia) Enzo Cheng	(Australia) Enzo Cheng	(Australia) Enzo Cheng	MC Corsa	
5	10	(South Australia) The Bend Motorsport Park	(Australia) Enzo Cheng	(Australia) Enzo Cheng	(Australia) Enzo Cheng	MC Corsa	

==== 488 ====
Rd	Race	Circuit	Pole position	Fastest lap	Race winner	Winning team	Results
1	1	(New South Wales) Mount Panorama Circuit	(Australia) Jarrod Ferrari	(Australia) Michel Stephan	(Australia) Jarrod Ferrari	MC Corsa	Report
1	2	(New South Wales) Mount Panorama Circuit	(Australia) Jarrod Ferrari	(Australia) Jarrod Ferrari	(Australia) Jarrod Ferrari	MC Corsa	Report
2	3	(Victoria (state)) Phillip Island Grand Prix Circuit	(Australia) Jarrod Ferrari	(Australia) Michel Stephan	(Australia) Michel Stephan	MC Corsa	Report
2	4	(Victoria (state)) Phillip Island Grand Prix Circuit	(Australia) Jarrod Ferrari	(Australia) Jarrod Ferrari	(Australia) Jarrod Ferrari	MC Corsa	Report
3	5	(New South Wales) Sydney Motorsport Park	(Australia) Michel Stephan	(Australia) Michel Stephan	(Australia) Michel Stephan	MC Corsa	Report
3	6	(New South Wales) Sydney Motorsport Park	(Australia) Michel Stephan	(Australia) Michel Stephan	(Australia) Michel Stephan	MC Corsa	Report
4	7	(New South Wales) Sydney Motorsport Park	(Australia) Jarrod Ferrari	(Australia) Jarrod Ferrari	(Australia) Jarrod Ferrari	MC Corsa	
4	8	(New South Wales) Sydney Motorsport Park	(Australia) Jarrod Ferrari	(Australia) Michel Stephan	(Australia) Jarrod Ferrari	MC Corsa	
5	9	(South Australia) The Bend Motorsport Park	(Australia) Paul Brockbank	(Australia) Paul Brockbank	(Australia) Michel Stephan	MC Corsa	
5	10	(South Australia) The Bend Motorsport Park	(Australia) Paul Brockbank	(Australia) Paul Brockbank	(Australia) Paul Brockbank	MC Corsa	

=== Points System ===
Position
1st	2nd	3rd	4th	5th	6th	7th	8th	PP	FL
15	12	10	8	6	4	2	1	1	1

=== Standings ===
==== Trofeo Pirelli ====
Pos.	Driver	(New South Wales) BAT		(Victoria (state)) PHI		(New South Wales) SYD1		(New South Wales) SYD2		(South Australia) BEN		Points
Pos.	Driver	R1	R2	R1	R2	R1	R2	R1	R2	R1	R2	Points
1	(Australia) Antoine Gittany	1	1	1	1	1	1			1	1	135
2	(Australia) Jim Pollicina	3	2	3	2	2	2	1	1	3	2	123
3	(Australia) Cameron Campbell	5	3	2	3	3	4	2	DNS	2	3	91
4	(Australia) Mark Hudders	4	5	5	4	4	3	3	2	5	5	82
5	(Australia) Rod Wilson	2	DNS							4	4	28
6	(Australia) Paul van Leonhout							4	3			18
7	(Austria) Ernst Kirchmayr	Ret	4									8
Pos.	Driver	(New South Wales) BAT		(Victoria (state)) PHI		(New South Wales) SYD1		(New South Wales) SYD2		(South Australia) BEN		Points
Pos.	Driver	R1	R2	R1	R2	R1	R2	R1	R2	R1	R2	Points

==== Coppa Shell ====
Pos.	Driver	(New South Wales) BAT		(Victoria (state)) PHI		(New South Wales) SYD1		(New South Wales) SYD2		(South Australia) BEN		Points
Pos.	Driver	R1	R2	R1	R2	R1	R2	R1	R2	R1	R2	Points
1	(Australia) Enzo Cheng	2	1	1	1	1	1	1	1	1	1	164
2	(Australia) David Trewern	1	2	2	2	3	3	2	2	4	2	118
3	(Japan) Masahiro Taguchi	3	4	3	3	4	4	5	4	3	4	86
4	(Australia) David Frish	5	3	Ret	DNS	6	5	3	3	5	6	56
5	(Australia) Tony Balidon	4	5	Ret	5	5	6	6	5	6	5	50
6	(Japan) Norikazu Shibata					2	2					24
7	(Australia) Aemel Nordin							Ret	DNS	2	3	22
8	(Australia) Nigel Hunt			4	4							16
9	(New Zealand) Michael Walker							4	DNS			16
Pos.	Driver	(New South Wales) BAT		(Victoria (state)) PHI		(New South Wales) SYD1		(New South Wales) SYD2		(South Australia) BEN		Points
Pos.	Driver	R1	R2	R1	R2	R1	R2	R1	R2	R1	R2	Points

==== Trofeo Pirelli 488 ====
Pos.	Driver	(New South Wales) BAT		(Victoria (state)) PHI		(New South Wales) SYD1		(New South Wales) SYD2		(South Australia) BEN		Points
Pos.	Driver	R1	R2	R1	R2	R1	R2	R1	R2	R1	R2	Points
1	(Australia) Michel Stephan	2	2	1	2	1	1	2	2	1	2	139
2	(Australia) Jarrod Ferrari	1	1	2	1			1	1			96
3	(Japan) "Baby Kei"	4	4			2	2	3	3	3	3	70
4	(Australia) Paul Brockbank									2	1	31
5	(China) Chris Huang	3	3									20
6	(Japan) Hiroyuki Katayama					3	3					20
7	(Australia) Manu Nithianathra	Ret	DNS									0
Pos.	Driver	(New South Wales) BAT		(Victoria (state)) PHI		(New South Wales) SYD1		(New South Wales) SYD2		(South Australia) BEN		Points
Pos.	Driver	R1	R2	R1	R2	R1	R2	R1	R2	R1	R2	Points
