= 2019 Ferrari Challenge North America =

The 2019 Ferrari Challenge North America was the 26th season of the Ferrari Challenge North America. The season was 7 rounds, starting at the Circuit of the Americas on March 9 and ending at the Mugello Circuit on October 26.

== Calendar ==
Rnd.	Circuit	Dates
1	(United States) Circuit of the Americas	March 9–10
2	(United States) Sebring International Raceway	April 6–7
3	(United States) WeatherTech Raceway Laguna Seca	May 11–12
4	(Canada) Circuit Gilles Villeneuve	June 8–9
5	(United States) Indianapolis Motor Speedway	July 27–28
6	(United States) Homestead-Miami Speedway	September 7–8
7	(Italy) Mugello Circuit	October 25–26

== Entry list ==
All teams and drivers used the Ferrari 488 Challenge fitted with Pirelli tyres.

=== Trofeo Pirelli ===
Team	No.	Driver	Class	Rounds
(United States) Ferrari of Beverly Hills	1	(United States) Thomas Tippl	Pro	1–4
(United States) Continental AutoSports	6	(United States) Joel Weinberger	Pro	2, 5
(United States) Continental AutoSports	36	(United States) Neil Gehani	Pro-Am	All
(United States) Ferrari of Silicon Valley	7	(France) Chris Carel	Pro-Am	2, 5
(United States) Ferrari of Silicon Valley	42	(United States) Mark Fuller	Pro-Am	1, 3, 5
(United States) Ron Tonkin Gran Turismo	8	(United States) Trevor Baek	Pro	5
(Canada) Ferrari of Vancouver	10	(Canada) Murray Rothlander	Pro	1
(United States) Boardwalk Ferrari	10	(United States) Karl Williams	Pro-Am	3
(United States) Boardwalk Ferrari	24	(Lebanon) Ziad Ghandour	Pro-Am	All
(United States) Ferrari of Atlanta	10	(United States) Sandro Espinosa	Pro-Am	5
(Canada) Ferrari of Ontario	13	(Canada) Marc Muzzo	Pro	All
(Canada) Ferrari of Ontario	99	(Canada) Barry Zekelman	Pro-Am	1–2, 4–6
(United States) Ferrari of Newport Beach	14	(United States) Brent Holden	Pro-Am	1–2, 4–7
(United States) The Collection	17	(United States) Amir Kermani	Pro	2, 6
(United States) The Collection	33	(Chile) Benjamín Hites	Pro	All
(United States) Ferrari of San Francisco	18	(United States) James Weiland	Pro	1, 4–6
(United States) Ferrari of Long Island	19	(United States) Brian Kaminskey	Pro-Am	1, 7
(United States) Ferrari of Long Island	23	(United States) John Megrue	Pro-Am	All
(United States) Ferrari of Long Island	28	(United States) Joseph Rubbo	Pro	1–3, 6
(United States) New County Competizione	21	(United States) Danny Baker	Pro-Am	3, 5
(United States) Ferrari of Palm Beach	25	(United States) Ross Chouest	Pro	1–5, 7
(United States) Ferrari of Lake Forest	30	(United States) David Musial	Pro-Am	All
(United States) Ferrari of Fort Lauderdale	46	(Canada) Martin Burrowes	Pro	1–6
(United States) Ferrari of Fort Lauderdale	56	(Venezuela) José Valera	Pro-Am	4
(United States) Ferrari Westlake	63	(United States) Cooper MacNeil	Pro	All
(United States) Ferrari of San Diego	64	(United States) Naveen Rao	Pro	3
(United States) Wide World Ferrari	72	(United States) Todd Morici	Pro-Am	1–4

=== Coppa Shell ===
Team	No.	Driver	Class	Rounds
(United States) Ferrari of Atlanta	100	(United States) Armin Oskouei	Am	1–4, 6–7
(United States) Ferrari of Atlanta	107	(United States) Mark Issa	Pro-Am	All
(United States) Ferrari of Atlanta	150	(United States) Michael Watt	Pro-Am	1–3, 5–6
(United States) Ferrari of Atlanta	176	(United States) Lance Cawley	Pro-Am	All
(United States) Ferrari of Washington	104	(United States) Theodore Giovanis	Am	1–3, 5–6
(United States) Foreign Cars Italia	105	(United States) Bradley Horstmann	Am	All
(United States) Wide World Ferrari	108	(United Kingdom) Mark Davies	Am	All
(United States) Ferrari of Central Florida	109	(United States) Robert Picerne	Am	2, 5–7
(United States) Ferrari of Central Florida	158	(United States) David Lo	Am	2
(United States) Ferrari of Central Florida	199	(United States) Justin Wetherill	Am	6
(United States) The Collection	111	(United States) Kam Habibi	Am	1–2, 4
(Canada) Ferrari of Ontario	112	(Canada) Mike Louli	Pro-Am	1, 3–5
(Canada) Ferrari of Ontario	139	(Canada) John Cervini	Am	6
(United States) Ferrari of San Francisco	113	(United States) Geoff Palermo	Pro-Am	1–5
(United States) Ferrari of San Francisco	124	(United States) Debra Palermo	Am	1–6
(United States) Ron Tonkin Gran Turismo	120	(United States) Keith Larson	Pro-Am	1–3, 5
(United States) Ferrari of Palm Beach	121	(United States) Danny Baker	Pro-Am	1–2
(United States) Ferrari of Palm Beach	126	(United States) Bill Kemp	Am	5
(United States) Ferrari of Palm Beach	128	(United States) Brian Davis	Pro-Am	All
(United States) Ferrari of Detroit	122	(United States) Brian Simon	Pro-Am	2
(United States) Ferrari of Detroit	163	(United States) Jay Schreibman	Am	All
(United States) Ferrari of Beverly Hills	127	(United States) Lisa Clark	Am	All
(United States) Ferrari of Beverly Hills	182	(United States) Joe Sposato	Am	1, 3, 5
(United States) Ferrari of Long Island	130	(Mexico) Luis Perusquia	Pro-Am	2, 5–6
(United States) Ferrari of Long Island	169	(United States) Kresimir Penavić	Pro-Am	1–3, 5–6
(United States) Ferrari of Long Island	179	(United States) Eileen Bildman	Am	1–3, 5–7
(United States) Ferrari of Fort Lauderdale	133	(Brazil) Rodolfo Lenci	Am	1–6
(United States) Ferrari of Fort Lauderdale	151	(Brazil) Claude Senhoreti	Pro-Am	All
(United States) Ferrari of Fort Lauderdale	183	(Poland) Kris Perszan	Am	1, 3, 5–6
(United States) Ferrari of Fort Lauderdale	190	(Mexico) Oscar Paredes-Arroyo	Pro-Am	1–6
(United States) Ferrari of San Diego	138	(United States) Kevin Millstein	Pro-Am	1–3, 5–6
(United States) Ferrari of Seattle	140	(United States) Roberto Perrina	Pro-Am	6
(United States) Miller Motor Cars	143	(United States) Dale Katechis	Pro-Am	1–6
(United States) Miller Motor Cars	193	(Chile) Osvaldo Gaio	Pro-Am	3, 6
(United States) Ferrari Westlake	148	(United States) Eric Marston	Am	All
(United States) Ferrari Southbay	153	(United States) Neil Langberg	Am	1–5
(United States) Ferrari of New England	155	(United States) Ian Campbell	Am	1–2, 5–6
(Canada) Ferrari of Quebec	165	(Canada) Gianni Grilli	Am	All
(United States) Ferrari of Denver	173	(United States) Sureel Choksi	Am	5–6
(United States) Ferrari of Newport Beach	178	(United States) Alan Hegyi	Am	1, 3–5, 7
(United States) Continental AutoSports	188	(United States) David Varwig	Pro-Am	2, 5

== Results and standings ==
=== Race results ===
Round	Race	Circuit	Pole position	Fastest lap	Trofeo Pirelli Winners	Coppa Shell Winners
1	1	(United States) Circuit of the Americas	TP Pro: (United States) Cooper MacNeil; TP Pro-Am: (United States) Mark Fuller; CS Pro-Am: (United States) Mark Issa; CS Am: (United States) Jay Schreibman	TP Pro: (United States) Cooper MacNeil; TP Pro-Am: (United States) Todd Morici; CS Pro-Am: (United States) Mark Issa; CS Am: (Poland) Kris Perszan	Pro: (Chile) Benjamín Hites; The Collection; Pro-Am: (United States) Mark Fuller; Ferrari of Silicon Valley	Pro-Am: (United States) Danny Baker; Ferrari of Palm Beach; Am: (United States) Ian Campbell; Ferrari of New England
1	2	(United States) Circuit of the Americas	TP Pro: (United States) Cooper MacNeil; TP Pro-Am: (Lebanon) Ziad Ghandour; CS Pro-Am: (United States) Danny Baker; CS Am: (United States) Eric Marston	TP Pro: (United States) Cooper MacNeil; TP Pro-Am: (Lebanon) Ziad Ghandour; CS Pro-Am: (United States) Mark Issa; CS Am: (United States) Lisa Clark	Pro: (United States) Cooper MacNeil; Ferrari Westlake; Pro-Am: (Lebanon) Ziad Ghandour; Boardwalk Ferrari	Pro-Am: (United States) Danny Baker; Ferrari of Palm Beach; Am: (United States) Eric Marston; Ferrari Westlake
2	1	(United States) Sebring International Raceway	TP Pro: (Chile) Benjamín Hites; TP Pro-Am: (United States) Neil Gehani; CS Pro-Am: (United States) Danny Baker; CS Am: (United States) Jay Schreibman	TP Pro: (Chile) Benjamín Hites; TP Pro-Am: (United States) Neil Gehani; CS Pro-Am: (United States) Mark Issa; CS Am: (United States) Jay Schreibman	Pro: (Chile) Benjamín Hites; The Collection; Pro-Am: (United States) Neil Gehani; Continental AutoSports	Pro-Am: (United States) Danny Baker; Ferrari of Palm Beach; Am: (United States) Lisa Clark; Ferrari of Beverly Hills
2	2	(United States) Sebring International Raceway	TP Pro: (United States) Cooper MacNeil; TP Pro-Am: (Lebanon) Ziad Ghandour; CS Pro-Am: (United States) Mark Issa; CS Am: (United States) Jay Schreibman	TP Pro: (United States) Cooper MacNeil; TP Pro-Am: (Lebanon) Ziad Ghandour; CS Pro-Am: (United States) Dale Katechis; CS Am: (United States) Bradley Horstmann	Pro: (United States) Cooper MacNeil; Ferrari Westlake; Pro-Am: (Lebanon) Ziad Ghandour; Boardwalk Ferrari	Pro-Am: (United States) Mark Issa; Ferrari of Atlanta; Am: (United States) Jay Schreibman; Ferrari of Detroit
3	1	(United States) WeatherTech Raceway Laguna Seca	TP Pro: (United States) Cooper MacNeil; TP Pro-Am: (United States) Karl Williams; CS Pro-Am: (United States) Mark Issa; CS Am: (United States) Jay Schreibman	TP Pro: (United States) Cooper MacNeil; TP Pro-Am: (United States) Neil Gehani; CS Pro-Am: (United States) Mark Issa; CS Am: (United States) Jay Schreibman	Pro: (United States) Cooper MacNeil; Ferrari Westlake; Pro-Am: (United States) Neil Gehani; Continental AutoSports	Pro-Am: (United States) Mark Issa; Ferrari of Atlanta; Am: (United States) Jay Schreibman; Ferrari of Detroit
3	2	(United States) WeatherTech Raceway Laguna Seca	TP Pro: (Chile) Benjamín Hites; TP Pro-Am: (United States) Karl Williams; CS Pro-Am: (United States) Mark Issa; CS Am: (United States) Jay Schreibman	TP Pro: (United States) Cooper MacNeil; TP Pro-Am: (United States) Karl Williams; CS Pro-Am: (United States) Mark Issa; CS Am: (United States) Jay Schreibman	Pro: (Canada) Martin Burrowes; Ferrari of Fort Lauderdale; Pro-Am: (United States) Karl Williams; Boardwalk Ferrari	Pro-Am: (United States) Mark Issa; Ferrari of Atlanta; Am: (United States) Joe Sposato; Ferrari of Beverly Hills
4	1	(Canada) Circuit Gilles Villeneuve	TP Pro: (United States) Cooper MacNeil; TP Pro-Am: (Canada) Barry Zekelman; CS Pro-Am: (United States) Mark Issa; CS Am: (United States) Jay Schreibman	TP Pro: (United States) Cooper MacNeil; TP Pro-Am: (Canada) Barry Zekelman; CS Pro-Am: (United States) Mark Issa; CS Am: (United States) Eric Marston	Pro: (United States) Cooper MacNeil; Ferrari Westlake; Pro-Am: (Lebanon) Ziad Ghandour; Boardwalk Ferrari	Pro-Am: (United States) Mark Issa; Ferrari of Atlanta; Am: (United States) Eric Marston; Ferrari Westlake
4	2	(Canada) Circuit Gilles Villeneuve	TP Pro: (United States) Cooper MacNeil; TP Pro-Am: (United States) Brent Holden; CS Pro-Am: (United States) Mark Issa; CS Am: (United States) Jay Schreibman	TP Pro: (United States) Cooper MacNeil; TP Pro-Am: (United States) Neil Gehani; CS Pro-Am: (Brazil) Claude Senhoreti; CS Am: (United States) Jay Schreibman	Pro: (United States) Cooper MacNeil; Ferrari Westlake; Pro-Am: (United States) Brent Holden; Ferrari of Newport Beach	Pro-Am: (Brazil) Claude Senhoreti; Ferrari of Fort Lauderdale; Am: (United States) Jay Schreibman; Ferrari of Detroit
5	1	(United States) Indianapolis Motor Speedway	TP Pro: (Chile) Benjamín Hites; TP Pro-Am: (United States) John Megrue; CS Pro-Am: (United States) Mark Issa; CS Am: (United States) Bradley Horstmann	TP Pro: (United States) Joel Weinberger; TP Pro-Am: (United States) John Megrue; CS Pro-Am: (United States) Mark Issa; CS Am: (United States) Bill Kemp	Pro: (Chile) Benjamín Hites; The Collection; Pro-Am: (United States) Neil Gehani; Continental AutoSports	Pro-Am: (United States) Dale Katechis; Miller Motor Cars; Am: (United States) Bradley Horstmann; Foreign Cars Italia
5	2	(United States) Indianapolis Motor Speedway	TP Pro: (United States) Cooper MacNeil; TP Pro-Am: (United States) Mark Fuller; CS Pro-Am: (United States) Mark Issa; CS Am: (United States) Bradley Horstmann	TP Pro: (Chile) Benjamín Hites; TP Pro-Am: (United States) Danny Baker; CS Pro-Am: (United States) Brian Davis; CS Am: (United States) Bill Kemp	Pro: (Chile) Benjamín Hites; The Collection; Pro-Am: (United States) Neil Gehani; Continental AutoSports	Pro-Am: (United States) Mark Issa; Ferrari of Atlanta; Am: (United States) Bradley Horstmann; Foreign Cars Italia
6	1	(United States) Homestead-Miami Speedway	TP Pro: (United States) Cooper MacNeil; TP Pro-Am: (United States) David Musial; CS Pro-Am: (United States) Mark Issa; CS Am: (United States) Jay Schreibman	TP Pro: (Canada) Martin Burrowes; TP Pro-Am: (United States) David Musial; CS Pro-Am: (United States) Roberto Perrina; CS Am: (United States) Jay Schreibman	Pro: (Chile) Benjamín Hites; The Collection; Pro-Am: (United States) David Musial; Ferrari of Lake Forest	Pro-Am: (United States) Mark Issa; Ferrari of Atlanta; Am: (United States) Jay Schreibman; Ferrari of Detroit
6	2	(United States) Homestead-Miami Speedway	TP Pro: (United States) Cooper MacNeil; TP Pro-Am: (United States) David Musial; CS Pro-Am: (United States) Roberto Perrina; CS Am: (United States) Ian Campbell	TP Pro: (Chile) Benjamín Hites; TP Pro-Am: (United States) David Musial; CS Pro-Am: (United States) Mark Issa; CS Am: (United States) Ian Campbell	Pro: (Chile) Benjamín Hites; The Collection; Pro-Am: (United States) David Musial; Ferrari of Lake Forest	Pro-Am: (United States) Roberto Perrina; Ferrari of Seattle; Am: (United States) Ian Campbell; Ferrari of New England
7	1	(Italy) Mugello Circuit	TP Pro: (Chile) Benjamín Hites; TP Pro-Am: (Lebanon) Ziad Ghandour; CS Pro-Am: (United States) Mark Issa; CS Am: (United Kingdom) Mark Davies	TP Pro: (Chile) Benjamín Hites; TP Pro-Am: (United States) David Musial; CS Pro-Am: (United States) Mark Issa; CS Am: (United States) Jay Schreibman	Pro: (United States) Cooper MacNeil; Ferrari Westlake; Pro-Am: (Lebanon) Ziad Ghandour; Boardwalk Ferrari	Pro-Am: (United States) Brian Davis; Ferrari of Palm Beach; Am: (United States) Jay Schreibman; Ferrari of Detroit
7	2	(Italy) Mugello Circuit	TP Pro: (United States) Cooper MacNeil; TP Pro-Am: (Lebanon) Ziad Ghandour; CS Pro-Am: (United States) Mark Issa; CS Am: (United States) Bradley Horstmann	TP Pro: (Chile) Benjamín Hites; TP Pro-Am: (Lebanon) Ziad Ghandour; CS Pro-Am: (United States) Brian Davis; CS Am: (United States) Bradley Horstmann	Pro: (Chile) Benjamín Hites; The Collection; Pro-Am: (United States) John Megrue; Ferrari of Long Island	Pro-Am: (United States) Brian Davis; Ferrari of Palm Beach; Am: (United States) Bradley Horstmann; Foreign Cars Italia

=== Championship standings ===
Points were awarded to the top ten classified finishers as follows:

Race Position	1st	2nd	3rd	4th	5th	6th	7th	8th	9th or lower	Pole	FLap	Entry
Points	20	15	12	10	8	6	4	2	1	1	1	1

Trofeo Pirelli

Pos.	Driver	(United States) AUS		(United States) SEB		(United States) MTY		(Canada) MTL		(United States) IND		(United States) MIA		(Italy) MUG		Points
Pos.	Driver	R1	R2	R1	R2	R1	R2	R1	R2	R1	R2	R1	R2	R1	R2	Points
Pro Class
1	(United States) Cooper MacNeil	2	1	2	1	1	4	1	1	2	2	4	4	1	2	250
2	(Chile) Benjamín Hites	1	2	1	3	2	Ret	3	2	1	1	1	1	2	1	243
3	(Canada) Marc Muzzo	6	5	6	5	6	5	4	3	6	5	2	2	3	4	139
4	(Canada) Martin Burrowes	3	3	9	8	3	1	Ret	Ret	3	3	3	3			128
5	(United States) Thomas Tippl	5	4	3	2	4	3	Ret	DNS							81
6	(United States) Ross Chouest	7	9	5	DNS	5	7	Ret	5	Ret	DNS			4	3	68
7	(United States) James Weiland	4	8					2	4	5	7	DNS	DNS			56
8	(United States) Joseph Rubbo	9	6	7	7	7	2					DNS	DNS			41
9	(United States) Joel Weinberger			4	6					4	4					38
10	(United States) Amir Kermani			8	4							DNS	DNS			19
11	(United States) Trevor Baek									7	6					11
12	(United States) Naveen Rao					8	6									10
=	(Canada) Murray Rothlander	8	7													10
Pro-Am Class
1	(United States) Neil Gehani	DNS	DNS	1	4	1	2	Ret	3	1	1	3	5	2	4	176
2	(Lebanon) Ziad Ghandour	3	1	3	1	6	4	1	Ret	DNS	DNS	2	2	1	5	175
3	(United States) David Musial	7	3	7	7	4	3	2	2	6	6	1	1	6	3	158
4	(United States) Brent Holden	5	5	2	3			6	1	4	4	4	3	4	2	144
5	(United States) John Megrue	8	6	Ret	8	3	5	5	6	2	7	5	4	3	1	127
6	(United States) Danny Baker					5	6			Ret	2					103
7	(Canada) Barry Zekelman	2	4	5	2			Ret	DNS	3	5	DNS	DNS			80
8	(United States) Todd Morici	4	2	6	5	Ret	DNS	4	5							67
9	(United States) Mark Fuller	1	DNS			Ret	DNS			5	3					52
10	(United States) Karl Williams					2	1									39
11	(France) Chris Carel			4	6					Ret	8					24
12	(Venezuela) José Valera							3	4							23
13	(United States) Brian Kaminskey	6	DNS											5	DNS	21
14	(United States) Sandro Espinosa									DNS	DNS					1

Coppa Shell

Pos.	Driver	(United States) AUS		(United States) SEB		(United States) MTY		(Canada) MTL		(United States) IND		(United States) MIA		(Italy) MUG		Points
Pos.	Driver	R1	R2	R1	R2	R1	R2	R1	R2	R1	R2	R1	R2	R1	R2	Points
Pro-Am Class
1	(United States) Mark Issa	2	2	Ret	1	1	1	1	Ret	2	1	1	2	3	4	236
2	(United States) Brian Davis	5	3	4	3	Ret	9	3	5	3	3	3	4	1	1	207
3	(Brazil) Claude Senhoreti	7	4	3	11	6	2	2	1	Ret	DNS	4	5	2	3	143
4	(United States) Dale Katechis	3	11	2	2	3	3	5	2	1	2	10	DNS			134
5	(Mexico) Oscar Paredes-Arroyo	10	7	6	9	2	4	4	3	4	4	6	6			106
6	(United States) Kevin Millstein	4	6	9	7	5	5			5	5	DNS	DNS			65
7	(United States) Lance Cawley	12	Ret	12	15	8	12	6	Ret	Ret	10	8	8	4	2	61
8	(United States) Geoff Palermo	6	5	10	4	4	11	DNS	DNS	DNS	DNS					49
9	(United States) Roberto Perrina											2	1			44
10	(United States) Keith Larson	8	8	7	5	Ret	7			7	7					41
11	(United States) Michael Watt	9	9	8	8	Ret	10			6	6	Ret	7			39
12	(Canada) Mike Louli	Ret	10			7	6	Ret	4	DNS	DNS					33
13	(Chile) Osvaldo Gaio					Ret	8					5	3			28
14	(United States) Kresimir Panević	11	12	11	13	9	13			8	8	9	DNS			22
15	(United States) Brian Simon			5	6											19
16	(Mexico) Luis Perusquia			13	14					9	11	7	9			16
17	(United States) David Varwig			Ret	10					Ret	9					8
–	(United States) Danny Baker‡	1	1	1	12											0
Am Class
1	(United States) Bradley Horstmann	8	DNS	5	2	6	4	2	2	1	1	2	7	2	1	168
2	(United States) Jay Schreibman	Ret	3	8	1	1	14	4	1	7	Ret	1	2	1	9	152
3	(United States) Eric Marston	5	1	3	3	Ret	9	1	5	9	6	7	8	3	4	117
4	(Canada) Gianni Grilli	4	2	4	6	4	6	3	3	2	Ret	Ret	DNS	10	6	103
5	(United Kingdom) Mark Davies	11	11	9	4	12	7	5	4	6	3	3	9	4	2	97
6	(United States) Lisa Clark	3	5	1	Ret	3	3	Ret	DNS	8	Ret	6	10	5	3	94
7	(United States) Ian Campbell	1	4	6	7					5	4	4	1			82
8	(United States) Theodore Giovanis	Ret	9	2	8	5	5			4	5	5	5			70
9	(Brazil) Rodolfo Lenci	6	8	10	5	2	2	DNS	DNS	Ret	10	11	6			58
10	(United States) Alan Hegyi	10	13			7	11	6	6	12	8			7	8	37
11	(United States) Joe Sposato	7	6			Ret	1			DNS	DNS					32
12	(United States) Bill Kemp									3	2					30
13	(United States) Robert Picerne			7	10					DNS	DNS	DNS	14	6	5	27
14	(United States) Eileen Bildman	14	16	14	13	11	15			11	7	12	13	9	7	26
15	(United States) Neil Langberg	15	12	11	12	8	13	8	7	13	11					23
=	(Poland) Kris Perszan	2	7			Ret	10			DNS	DNS	DNS	DNS			23
17	(United States) Armin Oskouei	9	14	Ret	9	10	8	DNS	DNS			10	12	8	DNS	20
18	(United States) Sureel Choksi									10	9	9	3			18
19	(United States) Kam Habibi	13	10	Ret	14			7	Ret							17
20	(United States) Debra Palermo	12	15	12	11	9	12	DNS	DNS	DNS	DNS	DNS	DNS			13
=	(United States) Justin Wetherill											8	4			13
22	(Canada) John Cervini											Ret	11			3
23	(United States) David Lo			13	DNS											2

‡ Driver ineligible for championship points.

== See also ==
- 2019 Finali Mondiali
