= 2018 Ferrari Challenge North America =

The 2018 Ferrari Challenge North America was the 25th season of Ferrari Challenge North America. The season consisted of 7 rounds, starting at the Daytona International Speedway on January 27 and ending at the Autodromo Nazionale Monza on November 3.

== Calendar ==
Rnd.	Circuit	Dates
1	(United States) Daytona International Speedway	January 27–28
2	(United States) Circuit of the Americas	March 10–11
3	(United States) WeatherTech Raceway Laguna Seca	May 6–7
4	(Canada) Circuit Gilles Villeneuve	June 9–10
5	(United States) Watkins Glen International	July 28–29
6	(United States) Road Atlanta	September 15–16
7	(Italy) Autodromo Nazionale Monza	November 2–3

== Entry list ==
All teams and drivers used the Ferrari 488 Challenge fitted with Pirelli tyres.

=== Trofeo Pirelli ===
Team	No.	Driver	Class	Rounds
(United States) Continental AutoSports	6	(United States) Joel Weinberger	Pro	1–5, 7
(United States) Continental AutoSports	36	(United States) Neil Gehani	Pro-Am	3–4
(United States) Ferrari of Long Island	9	(United States) Alfred Caiola	Pro-Am	1–6
(United States) Ferrari of Long Island	19	(United States) Chris Cagnazzi	Pro	All
(United States) Ferrari of Long Island	28	(United States) Joseph Rubbo	Pro	1–5
(Canada) Ferrari of Vancouver	10	(Canada) Murray Rothlander	Pro-Am	All
(United States) Wide World Ferrari	11	(United States) Peter Ludwig	Pro	All
(United States) Ferrari of Denver	12	(United Kingdom) John Boyd	Pro-Am	All
(Canada) Ferrari of Ontario	13	(Canada) Marc Muzzo	Pro	All
(Canada) Ferrari of Ontario	99	(Canada) Barry Zekelman	Pro-Am	1–4
(United States) Ferrari of Newport Beach	14	(United States) Brent Holden	Pro	1–4
(United States) Ferrari of Fort Lauderdale	16	(United States) Frank Selldorff	Pro-Am	4–7
(United States) Ferrari of Fort Lauderdale	56	(Venezuela) José Valera	Pro-Am	4
(United States) The Collection	17	(United States) Amir Kermani	Pro	1–2, 6
(United States) The Collection	33	(Chile) Benjamín Hites	Pro	All
(United States) Boardwalk Ferrari	18	(United States) James Weiland	Pro	1–2, 4, 7
(United States) Boardwalk Ferrari	61	(United States) Jean-Claude Saada	Pro	1–2, 4–7
(United States) Ferrari of San Francisco	24	(Lebanon) Ziad Ghandour	Pro-Am	2
(United States) Ferrari of Palm Beach	25	(United States) Ross Chouest	Pro-Am	All
(United States) Lake Forest Sportscars	27	(United States) Cort Wagner	Pro	1
(United States) Lake Forest Sportscars	30	(United States) David Musial	Pro-Am	1–6
(United States) Ferrari of Washington	51	(United States) Robert Hodes	Pro-Am	All
(United States) Ferrari of Silicon Valley	63	(United States) Cooper MacNeil	Pro	All
(United States) Ferrari of San Diego	64	(United States) Naveen Rao	Pro	1–6
(United States) Ferrari of Beverly Hills	77	(Philippines) Angie King	Pro	3–5, 7
(United States) Miller Motor Cars	93	(Chile) Osvaldo Gaio	Pro-Am	1–3, 5

=== Coppa Shell ===
Team	No.	Driver	Class	Rounds
(United States) Ferrari of Atlanta	100	(United States) Armin Oskouei	Am	6
(United States) Ferrari of Atlanta	134	(United States) Michael Watt	Pro-Am	3, 5–6
(United States) Ferrari of Atlanta	176	(United States) Lance Cawley	Pro-Am	1–3, 5–6
(United States) Ferrari of Washington	104	(United States) Theodore Giovanis	Am	5–7
(United States) Ferrari of Fort Lauderdale	106	(United States) Tomas Cabrerizo	Am	5
(United States) Ferrari Westlake	107	(France) Chris Carel	Pro-Am	1, 3–7
(United States) Ferrari Westlake	142	(United States) Mark Fuller	Pro-Am	All
(United States) Ferrari of Central Florida	108	(United States) David Lo	Am	1
(United States) Ferrari of Central Florida	126	(United States) Robert Picerne	Pro-Am	1–3
(United States) Ferrari of San Antonio	110	(United States) Sam Vick	Am	2–3, 5
(United States) Ferrari of South Bay	111	(United States) Bradley Smith	Am	All
(United States) Ferrari of South Bay	129	(United States) James Camp	Am	All
(United States) Ferrari of San Francisco	113	(United States) Geoff Palermo	Pro-Am	1–3, 5–7
(United States) Wide World Ferrari	115	(United States) Jason McCarthy	Pro-Am	1–2, 5–6
(United States) Wide World Ferrari	172	(United States) Chris O'Donnell	Pro-Am	5–6
(Canada) Ferrari of Vancouver	118	(Canada) Colin Liu	Am	1, 3
(United States) Ron Tonkin Gran Turismo	120	(United States) Keith Larson	Am	6
(United States) Ron Tonkin Gran Turismo	187	(United States) Richard Baek	Pro-Am	2–3, 5–6
(United States) Ferrari of Beverly Hills	121	(United States) Thomas Tippl	Pro-Am	All
(United States) Ferrari of Beverly Hills	153	(United States) Neil Langberg	Am	2–5
(United States) Ferrari of Detroit	122	(United States) Brian Simon	Am	1–3, 5–7
(United States) Ferrari of Detroit	163	(United States) Jay Schreibmann	Am	6
(United States) Ferrari of Long Island	123	(United States) John Megrue	Am	1–3, 5–7
(United States) Ferrari of Long Island	169	(United States) Kresimir Penavić	Am	5–6
(United States) Ferrari of Long Island	171	(United States) Brian Kaminskey	Pro-Am	1–2, 4–5, 7
(United States) Ferrari of Long Island	199	(United States) Alfredo di Scipio	Am	2
(United States) Lake Forest Sportscars	127	(United States) Rick Mancuso	Am	2
(United States) Ferrari of Tampa Bay	130	(Mexico) Luis Perusquia	Pro-Am	1–3, 5, 7
(United States) Ferrari of Tampa Bay	183	(United States) Charles Bruck	Am	3–5, 7
(United States) Ferrari North America	133	(Republic of Ireland) Michael Fassbender	Pro-Am	1–4
(United States) Ferrari of San Diego	138	(United States) Kevin Millstein	Am	2–7
(United States) Ferrari of Silicon Valley	148	(United States) Edward Baalbaki	Am	2
(United States) Ferrari of Silicon Valley	179	(United States) David MacNeil	Am	1
(United States) Ferrari of Silicon Valley	190	(Mexico) Oscar Paredes-Arroyo	Pro-Am	1–6
(United States) The Collection	151	(United States) Kam Habibi	Am	1, 3
(United States) The Collection	197	(Ecuador) Roberto Cava	Am	2, 4–5, 7
(United States) Miller Motor Cars	155	(United States) Dale Katechis	Am	1–4, 6–7
(Canada) Ferrari of Ontario	177	(Canada) Aldo Gottardo	Am	2–6
(United States) Ferrari of Newport Beach	178	(United States) Alan Hegyi	Am	3–4, 7
(United States) Continental AutoSports	188	(United States) David Varwig	Pro-Am	2–5, 7

== Results and standings ==
=== Race results ===
Round	Race	Circuit	Pole position	Fastest lap	Trofeo Pirelli Winners	Coppa Shell Winners
1	1	(United States) Daytona International Speedway	TP Pro: (United States) Cooper MacNeil; TP Pro-Am: (United States) David Musial; CS Pro-Am: (United States) Thomas Tippl; CS Am: (United States) Dale Katechis	TP Pro: (United States) Peter Ludwig; TP Pro-Am: (United States) Alfred Caiola; CS Pro-Am: (France) Chris Carel; CS Am: (United States) Dale Katechis	Pro: (United States) Cooper MacNeil; Ferrari of Silicon Valley; Pro-Am: (United States) Alfred Caiola; Ferrari of Long Island	Pro-Am: (Republic of Ireland) Michael Fassbender; Ferrari North America; Am: (United States) John Megrue; Ferrari of Long Island
1	2	(United States) Daytona International Speedway	TP Pro: (United States) Cooper MacNeil; TP Pro-Am: (United States) Robert Hodes; CS Pro-Am: (United States) Brian Kaminskey; CS Am: (United States) John Megrue	TP Pro: (United States) Cooper MacNeil; TP Pro-Am: (United States) Alfred Caiola; CS Pro-Am: (France) Chris Carel; CS Am: (United States) Dale Katechis	Pro: (United States) Peter Ludwig; Wide World Ferrari; Pro-Am: (United States) Robert Hodes; Ferrari of Washington	Pro-Am: (United States) Brian Kaminskey; Ferrari of Long Island; Am: (United States) Dale Katechis; Miller Motor Cars
2	1	(United States) Circuit of the Americas	TP Pro: (United States) Cooper MacNeil; TP Pro-Am: (United Kingdom) John Boyd; CS Pro-Am: (United States) Thomas Tippl; CS Am: (United States) Brian Simon	TP Pro: (United States) Peter Ludwig; TP Pro-Am: (United States) Ross Chouest; CS Pro-Am: (United States) Thomas Tippl; CS Am: (United States) Dale Katechis	Pro: (United States) Cooper MacNeil; Ferrari of Silicon Valley; Pro-Am: (United States) Robert Hodes; Ferrari of Washington	Pro-Am: (United States) Thomas Tippl; Ferrari of Beverly Hills; Am: (United States) Brian Simon; Ferrari of Detroit
2	2	(United States) Circuit of the Americas	TP Pro: (United States) Cooper MacNeil; TP Pro-Am: (United States) Robert Hodes; CS Pro-Am: (United States) Thomas Tippl; CS Am: (United States) Brian Simon	TP Pro: (Chile) Benjamín Hites; TP Pro-Am: (Canada) Murray Rothlander; CS Pro-Am: (United States) Thomas Tippl; CS Am: (United States) Kevin Millstein	Pro: (Chile) Benjamín Hites; The Collection; Pro-Am: (Canada) Murray Rothlander; Ferrari of Vancouver	Pro-Am: (United States) Thomas Tippl; Ferrari of Beverly Hills; Am: (United States) John Megrue; Ferrari of Long Island
3	1	(United States) WeatherTech Raceway Laguna Seca	TP Pro: (Canada) Marc Muzzo; TP Pro-Am: (United Kingdom) John Boyd; CS Pro-Am: (United States) Thomas Tippl; CS Am: (United States) John Megrue	TP Pro: (United States) Peter Ludwig; TP Pro-Am: (Canada) Barry Zekelman; CS Pro-Am: (United States) Thomas Tippl; CS Am: (United States) Kevin Millstein	Pro: (United States) Cooper MacNeil; Ferrari of Silicon Valley; Pro-Am: (United Kingdom) John Boyd; Ferrari of Denver	Pro-Am: (United States) Thomas Tippl; Ferrari of Beverly Hills; Am: (United States) John Megrue; Ferrari of Long Island
3	2	(United States) WeatherTech Raceway Laguna Seca	TP Pro: (United States) Peter Ludwig; TP Pro-Am: (United States) Ross Chouest; CS Pro-Am: (United States) Thomas Tippl; CS Am: (United States) John Megrue	TP Pro: (United States) Peter Ludwig; TP Pro-Am: (United States) Ross Chouest; CS Pro-Am: (United States) Thomas Tippl; CS Am: (United States) Dale Katechis	Pro: (United States) Peter Ludwig; Wide World Ferrari; Pro-Am: (United Kingdom) John Boyd; Ferrari of Denver	Pro-Am: (United States) Thomas Tippl; Ferrari of Beverly Hills; Am: (United States) John Megrue; Ferrari of Long Island
4	1	(Canada) Circuit Gilles Villeneuve	TP Pro: (United States) Cooper MacNeil; TP Pro-Am: (United States) David Musial; CS Pro-Am: (United States) Thomas Tippl; CS Am: (United States) Dale Katechis	TP Pro: (United States) Cooper MacNeil; TP Pro-Am: (United States) Alfred Caiola; CS Pro-Am: (United States) Thomas Tippl; CS Am: (Ecuador) Roberto Cava	Pro: (United States) Cooper MacNeil; Ferrari of Silicon Valley; Pro-Am: (United States) David Musial; Lake Forest Sportscars	Pro-Am: (United States) Thomas Tippl; Ferrari of Beverly Hills; Am: (Ecuador) Roberto Cava; The Collection
4	2	(Canada) Circuit Gilles Villeneuve	TP Pro: (United States) Cooper MacNeil; TP Pro-Am: (United States) David Musial; CS Pro-Am: (United States) Thomas Tippl; CS Am: (Ecuador) Roberto Cava	TP Pro: (United States) Cooper MacNeil; TP Pro-Am: (United States) David Musial; CS Pro-Am: (United States) Thomas Tippl; CS Am: (Ecuador) Roberto Cava	Pro: (United States) Cooper MacNeil; Ferrari of Silicon Valley; Pro-Am: (United States) Alfred Caiola; Ferrari of Long Island	Pro-Am: (United States) Thomas Tippl; Ferrari of Beverly Hills; Am: (United States) James Camp; Ferrari of South Bay
5	1	(United States) Watkins Glen International	TP Pro: (United States) Cooper MacNeil; TP Pro-Am: (Canada) Murray Rothlander; CS Pro-Am: (United States) Thomas Tippl; CS Am: (United States) John Megrue	TP Pro: (United States) Cooper MacNeil; TP Pro-Am: (United States) Robert Hodes; CS Pro-Am: (United States) Thomas Tippl; CS Am: (United States) Bradley Smith	Pro: (United States) Cooper MacNeil; Ferrari of Silicon Valley; Pro-Am: (United States) Ross Chouest; Ferrari of Palm Beach	Pro-Am: (United States) Thomas Tippl; Ferrari of Beverly Hills; Am: (United States) Kevin Millstein; Ferrari of San Diego
5	2	(United States) Watkins Glen International	TP Pro: (United States) Cooper MacNeil; TP Pro-Am: (Canada) Murray Rothlander; CS Pro-Am: (United States) Thomas Tippl; CS Am: (United States) Brian Simon	TP Pro: (United States) Cooper MacNeil; TP Pro-Am: (United States) Robert Hodes; CS Pro-Am: (United States) Thomas Tippl; CS Am: (United States) John Megrue	Pro: (United States) Cooper MacNeil; Ferrari of Silicon Valley; Pro-Am: (Canada) Murray Rothlander; Ferrari of Vancouver	Pro-Am: (United States) Thomas Tippl; Ferrari of Beverly Hills; Am: (United States) Brian Simon; Ferrari of Detroit
6	1	(United States) Road Atlanta	TP Pro: (United States) Cooper MacNeil; TP Pro-Am: (United States) Ross Chouest; CS Pro-Am: (United States) Thomas Tippl; CS Am: (United States) John Megrue	TP Pro: (United States) Cooper MacNeil; TP Pro-Am: (United States) Robert Hodes; CS Pro-Am: (United States) Thomas Tippl; CS Am: (United States) John Megrue	Pro: (United States) Cooper MacNeil; Ferrari of Silicon valley Pro-Am: (United States) Ross Chouest; Ferrari of Palm Beach	Pro-Am: (United States) Thomas Tippl; Ferrari of Beverly Hills; Am: (United States) John Megrue; Ferrari of Long Island
6	2	(United States) Road Atlanta	TP Pro: (United States) Peter Ludwig; TP Pro-Am: (Canada) Murray Rothlander; CS Pro-Am: (United States) Geoff Palermo; CS Am: (United States) John Megrue	TP Pro: (United States) Peter Ludwig; TP Pro-Am: (Canada) Murray Rothlander; CS Pro-Am: (United States) Geoff Palermo; CS Am: (United States) John Megrue	Pro: (United States) Peter Ludwig; Wide World Ferrari; Pro-Am: (United States) Ross Chouest; Ferrari of Palm Beach	Pro-Am: (United States) Geoff Palermo; Ferrari of San Francisco; Am: (United States) John Megrue; Ferrari of Long Island
7	1	(Italy) Autodromo Nazionale Monza	TP Pro: (United States) Cooper MacNeil; TP Pro-Am: (Canada) Murray Rothlander; CS Pro-Am: (United States) Thomas Tippl; CS Am: (United States) Dale Katechis	TP Pro: (United States) Cooper MacNeil; TP Pro-Am: (United States) Ross Chouest; CS Pro-Am: (United States) Thomas Tippl; CS Am: (United States) Brian Simon	Pro: (United States) Cooper MacNeil; Ferrari of Silicon Valley; Pro-Am: (United States) Ross Chouest; Ferrari of Palm Beach	Pro-Am: (United States) Thomas Tippl; Ferrari of Beverly Hills; Am: (United States) John Megrue; Ferrari of Long Island
7	2	(Italy) Autodromo Nazionale Monza	TP Pro: (United States) Peter Ludwig; TP Pro-Am: (Canada) Murray Rothlander; CS Pro-Am: (United States) Thomas Tippl; CS Am: (United States) John Megrue	TP Pro: (United States) Peter Ludwig; TP Pro-Am: (Canada) Murray Rothlander; CS Pro-Am: (United States) Thomas Tippl; CS Am: (United States) John Megrue	Pro: (Chile) Benjamín Hites; The Collection; Pro-Am: (Canada) Murray Rothlander; Ferrari of Vancouver	Pro-Am: (United States) Mark Fuller; Ferrari Westlake; Am: (United States) Brian Simon; Ferrari of Detroit

=== Championship standings ===
Points were awarded to the top ten classified finishers as follows:

Race Position	1st	2nd	3rd	4th	5th	6th	7th	8th	9th or lower	Pole	FLap	Entry
Points	20	15	12	10	8	6	4	2	1	1	1	1

Trofeo Pirelli

Pos.	Driver	(United States) DAY		(United States) AUS		(United States) MTY		(Canada) MTL		(United States) WKG		(United States) ATL		(Italy) MNZ		Points
Pos.	Driver	R1	R2	R1	R2	R1	R2	R1	R2	R1	R2	R1	R2	R1	R2	Points
Pro Class
1	(United States) Cooper MacNeil	1	2	1	Ret	1	DNS	1	1	1	1	1	4	1	DNS	230
2	(United States) Peter Ludwig	2	1	2	Ret	9	1	2	2	2	2	3	1	2	5	204
3	(Chile) Benjamín Hites	9	10	3	1	5	4	Ret	Ret	6	8	2	2	5	1	130
4	(Canada) Marc Muzzo	5	9	7	3	2	7	3	4	4	6	DNS	DNS	4	4	111
5	(United States) Chris Cagnazzi	6	11	8	Ret	4	3	8	7	5	5	5	3	7	DNS	89
6	(United States) Naveen Rao	11	6	4	2	6	6	5	9	10	3	6	5			88
7	(United States) James Weiland	3	3	9	4			4	3					6	2	86
8	(United States) Jean-Claude Saada	7	7	5	7			6	6	3	Ret	DNS	DNS	3	3	77
9	(United States) Joseph Rubbo	4	4	10	Ret	3	2	9	8	7	4					75
10	(United States) Joel Weinberger	8	5	6	5	Ret	8	7	5	9	Ret			DNS	DNS	51
11	(Philippines) Angie King					8	5	Ret	10	8	7			Ret	Ret	22
12	(United States) Amir Kermani	10	Ret	Ret	6							4	6			18
13	(United States) Brent Holden	12	12	DNS	DNS	7	9	Ret	DNS							14
14	(United States) Cort Wagner	Ret	8													5
Pro-Am Class
1	(United States) Ross Chouest	Ret	Ret	4	2	7	4	4	3	1	2	1	1	1	3	188
2	(United States) Robert Hodes	3	1	1	3	2	3	5	6	4	3	4	4	3	4	182
3	(Canada) Murray Rothlander	7	6	3	1	4	7	7	4	3	1	2	2	Ret	1	177
4	(United Kingdom) John Boyd	4	Ret	Ret	5	1	1	DNS	DNS	2	Ret	3	3	2	2	153
5	(United States) Alfred Caiola	1	5	Ret	DNS	3	2	2	1	5	4	Ret	6			130
6	(United States) David Musial	2	4	2	4	6	8	1	2	Ret	DNS	Ret	DNS			117
7	(United States) Frank Selldorff							3	7	Ret	5	Ret	5	4	DNS	44
8	(Chile) Osvaldo Gaio	6	3	Ret	6	8	6			DNS	DNS					43
9	(Canada) Barry Zekelman	5	2	Ret	DNS	9	9	DNS	DNS							41
10	(United States) Neil Gehani					5	5	6	5							34
11	(Venezuela) José Valera							8	8							9
12	(Lebanon) Ziad Ghandour			Ret	DNS											5

Coppa Shell

Pos.	Driver	(United States) DAY		(United States) AUS		(United States) MTY		(Canada) MTL		(United States) WKG		(United States) ATL		(Italy) MNZ		Points
Pos.	Driver	R1	R2	R1	R2	R1	R2	R1	R2	R1	R2	R1	R2	R1	R2	Points
Pro-Am Class
1	(United States) Thomas Tippl	9	4	1	1	1	1	1	1	1	1	1	5	1	2	284
2	(United States) Mark Fuller	4	2	4	4	2	4	2	2	2	2	2	2	Ret	1	192
3	(France) Chris Carel	2	3			4	2	4	Ret	3	3	3	3	3	3	147
4	(United States) Brian Kaminskey	3	1	6	DNS			3	Ret	5	5			2	4	105
5	(Republic of Ireland) Michael Fassbender	1	Ret	2	2	5	3	6	3							94
6	(United States) Geoff Palermo	5	Ret	3	3	Ret	DNS			Ret	11	4	1	4	Ret	91
7	(United States) David Varwig			8	7	8	8	5	Ret	6	7			5	5	53
8	(United States) Richard Baek			5	5	3	5			7	6	Ret	DNS			52
9	(United States) Jason McCarthy	7	Ret	Ret	Ret					4	9	DNS	DNS			43
10	(Mexico) Oscar Paredes-Arroyo	6	DNS	11	6	DNS	DNS	7	4	Ret	Ret	6	DNS			41
=	(United States) Lance Cawley	11	6	10	10	7	6			Ret	8	7	6			41
12	(United States) Robert Picerne	8	5	7	8	6	7									37
13	(Mexico) Luis Perusquia	10	Ret	9	9	Ret	9			9	Ret			6	6	33
14	(United States) Michael Watt					DNS	DNS			8	4	5	7			27
15	(United States) Chris O'Donnell									10	10	8	4			17
Am Class
1	(United States) John Megrue	1	6	Ret	1	1	1			Ret	4	1	1	1	3	187
2	(United States) Kevin Millstein			3	2	3	3	Ret	2	1	2	2	Ret	5	5	146
3	(United States) Dale Katechis	2	1	2	10	2	2	Ret	8			4	2	4	Ret	134
4	(United States) Brian Simon	3	2	1	4	5	7			11	1	DNS	DNS	2	1	130
5	(United States) Bradley Smith	6	3	Ret	8	4	4	6	Ret	2	Ret	7	3	8	DNS	102
6	(United States) James Camp	7	7	4	5	8	12	2	1	8	11	8	DNS	6	6	81
7	(United States) Theodore Giovanis									7	7	5	4	3	2	56
=	(Canada) Aldo Gottardo			9	7	7	9	5	5	9	8	9	DNS			56
9	(Ecuador) Roberto Cava			5	3			1	7	4	6			7	4	54
10	(United States) Alan Hegyi					10	5	3	3					9	7	50
11	(United States) Charles Bruck					6	13	7	4	5	5			DNS	Ret	46
12	(United States) Neil Langberg			7	6	9	6	4	6	10	10					38
13	(United States) Tomas Cabrerizo									3	3					25
=	(Canada) Colin Liu	4	4			11	8									25
15	(United States) Keith Larson											3	5			21
16	(United States) David MacNeil	5	5													17
17	(United States) Kresimir Penavić									6	9	Ret	7			15
18	(United States) Armin Oskouei											6	6			13
=	(United States) Sam Vick			8	9	13	11			Ret	Ret					13
20	(United States) Rick Mancuso			6	DNS											11
21	(United States) Kam Habibi	DNS	DNS			12	10									9
22	(United States) David Lo	Ret	Ret													6
23	(United States) Jay Schreibmann											Ret	DNS			2
24	(United States) Edward Baalbaki			DNS	DNS											1
=	(United States) Alfredo di Scipio			DNS	DNS											1

== See also ==
- 2018 Finali Mondiali
