= 2021 3 Hours of Nürburgring =

(Germany) 2021 3 Hours of Nürburgring
Event Information
- Round 4 of 5 in the [[ ]]
- Date: 3–5 September
- Location: Nürburg, Rhineland-Palatinate, Germany
- Venue: Nürburgring

Results
Race 1
Distance	87 laps	447.876 km
Pole position	(Italy) Mirko Bortolotti (Italy) Marco Mapelli (Italy) Andrea Caldarelli; FFF Racing Team	1:54.633
Winner	(Italy) Mirko Bortolotti (Italy) Marco Mapelli (Italy) Andrea Caldarelli; FFF Racing Team	3:00:53.243

The 2021 3 Hours of Nürburgring was a motor racing event for the GT World Challenge Europe Endurance Cup, held on the weekend of 3 to 5 September 2021. The event was held on the Nürburgring in Nürburg, Rhineland-Palatinate, Germany and consisted of a single race, three hours in length. It was the fourth event in the 2021 GT World Challenge Europe Endurance Cup.

== Results ==
=== Qualifying ===
Pos.	No.	Driver	Team	Car	Class	Individual	Combined	Gap
1	63	(Italy) Mirko Bortolotti (Italy) Marco Mapelli (Italy) Andrea Caldarelli	(China) FFF Racing Team	Lamborghini Huracán GT3 Evo	P	1:54.806; 1:54.637; 1:54.456	1:54.633	
2	88	(Italy) Raffaele Marciello (Brazil) Felipe Fraga (France) Jules Gounon	(France) AKKA ASP	Mercedes-AMG GT3 Evo	P	1:54.686; 1:54.763; 1:54.585	1:54.678	+0.045
3	22	(Australia) Matthew Campbell (New Zealand) Earl Bamber (France) Mathieu Jaminet	(United Arab Emirates) GPX Martini Racing	Porsche 911 GT3 R	P	1:54.943; 1:55.297; 1:54.284	1:54.841	+0.208
4	4	(Germany) Maro Engel (Germany) Luca Stolz (Germany) Nico Bastian	(Germany) Haupt Racing Team	Mercedes-AMG GT3 Evo	P	1:54.778; 1:54.637; 1:55.168	1:54.861	+0.228
5	114	(Finland) Konsta Lappalainen (Italy) Luca Ghiotto (France) Arthur Rougier	(Switzerland) Emil Frey Racing	Lamborghini Huracán GT3 Evo	P	1:55.561; 1:55.120; 1:54.654	1:55.111	+0.478
6	163	(Austria) Norbert Siedler (Italy) Giacomo Altoè (Spain) Alberto Costa	(Switzerland) Emil Frey Racing	Lamborghini Huracán GT3 Evo	P	1:55.754; 1:55.309; 1:54.392	1:55.151	+0.518
7	54	(Italy) Matteo Cairoli (Austria) Klaus Bachler (Germany) Christian Engelhart	(Italy) Dinamic Motorsport	Porsche 911 GT3 R	P	1:55.331; 1:55.074; 1:55.073	1:55.159	+0.526
8	71	(United Kingdom) Callum Ilott (Italy) Alessio Rovera (Italy) Antonio Fuoco	(Italy) Iron Lynx Motorsport Lab	Ferrari 488 GT3 Evo 2020	P	1:55.592; 1:55.493; 1:54.550	1:55.211	+0.578
9	51	(Italy) Alessandro Pier Guidi (France) Côme Ledogar (Denmark) Nicklas Nielsen	(Italy) Iron Lynx Motorsport Lab	Ferrari 488 GT3 Evo 2020	P	1:55.533; 1:55.386; 1:54.985	1:55.301	+0.668
10	16	(Austria) Clemens Schmid (Italy) Emilian Galbiati (Germany) Tim Zimmermann	(Austria) Grasser Racing Team	Lamborghini Huracán GT3 Evo	S	1:55.524; 1:55.550; 1:54.894	1:55.322	+0.689
11	159	(United Kingdom) Alex MacDowall (Denmark) Nicolai Kjærgaard (France) Valentin Hasse-Clot	(United Kingdom) Garage 59	Aston Martin Vantage AMR GT3	S	1:56.145; 1:54.994; 1:55.045	1:55.394	+0.761
12	32	(Belgium) Dries Vanthoor (Belgium) Charles Weerts (Netherlands) Robin Frijns	(Belgium) Team WRT	Audi R8 LMS Evo	P	1:55.381; 1:55.376; 1:55.472	1:55.409	+0.776
13	34	(United Kingdom) Nick Yelloly (United Kingdom) David Pittard (United Kingdom) Jake Dennis	(Germany) Walkenhorst Motorsport	BMW M6 GT3	P	1:55.451; 1:55.519; 1:55.295	1:55.421	+0.788
14	14	(Switzerland) Alex Fontana (Switzerland) Rolf Ineichen (Switzerland) Ricardo Feller	(Switzerland) Emil Frey Racing	Lamborghini Huracán GT3 Evo	S	1:55.579; 1:56.091; 1:54.669	1:55.446	+0.813
15	7	(Colombia) Óscar Tunjo (France) Paul Petit (Germany) Marvin Dienst	(Germany) Toksport	Mercedes-AMG GT3 Evo	S	1:55.316; 1:56.198; 1:54.848	1:55.454	+0.821
16	99	(Germany) Dennis Marschall (Austria) Max Hofer (Germany) Alex Aka	(Germany) Attempto Racing	Audi R8 LMS Evo	S	1:55.985; 1:55.090; 1:55.488	1:55.521	+0.888
17	35	(Netherlands) Nick Catsburg (Germany) Martin Tomczyk (France) Thomas Neubauer	(Germany) Walkenhorst Motorsport	BMW M6 GT3	P	1:55.634; 1:55.440; 1:55.596	1:55.556	+0.923
18	222	(Denmark) Bastian Buus (Germany) Joel Sturm (Switzerland) Julian Apothéloz	(Germany) Allied Racing	Porsche 911 GT3 R	S	1:55.408; 1:55.838; 1:55.528	1:55.591	+0.958
19	90	(Argentina) Ezequiel Pérez Companc (Mexico) Ricardo Sánchez (Netherlands) Rik Breukers	(Argentina) Madpanda Motorsport	Mercedes-AMG GT3 Evo	S	1:55.418; 1:56.554; 1:55.030	1:55.667	+1.034
20	5	(Italy) Michele Beretta (Germany) Patrick Assenheimer (Germany) Hubert Haupt	(Germany) Haupt Racing Team	Mercedes-AMG GT3 Evo	S	1:55.675; 1:55.214; 1:56.129	1:55.672	+1.039
21	87	(France) Thomas Drouet (France) Simon Gachet (Russia) Konstantin Tereshchenko	(France) AKKA ASP	Mercedes-AMG GT3 Evo	S	1:55.816; 1:55.419; 1:55.833	1:55.689	+1.056
22	66	(Italy) Mattia Drudi (Austria) Nicolas Schöll (Germany) Christopher Mies	(Germany) Attempto Racing	Audi R8 LMS Evo	P	1:56.136; 1:56.078; 1:55.295	1:55.836	+1.203
23	26	(Germany) Markus Winkelhock (United Kingdom) Finlay Hutchison (Belgium) Frédéric Vervisch	(France) Saintéloc Racing	Audi R8 LMS Evo	P	1:55.990; 1:56.438; 1:55.125	1:55.851	+1.218
24	40	(Switzerland) Yannick Mettler (Australia) Jordan Love (Switzerland) Niklas Born	(Germany) SPS Automotive Performance	Mercedes-AMG GT3 Evo	S	1:56.065; 1:56.132; 1:55.451	1:55.882	+1.249
25	25	(France) Adrien Tambay (France) Alexandre Cougnaud (Germany) Christopher Haase	(France) Saintéloc Racing	Audi R8 LMS Evo	P	1:55.840; 1:56.423; 1:55.412	1:55.891	+1.258
26	93	(Italy) Rino Mastronardi (Hong Kong) Jonathan Hui (United Kingdom) Chris Froggatt	(United Kingdom) Tempesta Racing	Ferrari 488 GT3 Evo 2020	PA	1:56.072; 1:56.194; 1:55.461	1:55.909	+1.276
27	33	(South Africa) David Perel (Chile) Benjamín Hites (Finland) Patrick Kujala	(Germany) Rinaldi Racing	Ferrari 488 GT3 Evo 2020	S	1:55.880; 1:56.332; 1:55.346	1:56.012	+1.379
28	56	(Italy) Andrea Rizzoli (Denmark) Mikkel Pedersen (France) Romain Dumas	(Italy) Dinamic Motorsport	Porsche 911 GT3 R	P	1:56.562; 1:55.770; 1:55.890	1:56.074	+1.441
29	30	(United Kingdom) James Pull (United Kingdom) Stuart Hall (Denmark) Benjamin Goethe	(Belgium) Team WRT	Audi R8 LMS Evo	S	1:56.103; 1:56.280; 1:56.004	1:56.129	+1.496
30	31	(Japan) Ryuichiro Tomita (Denmark) Valdemar Eriksen (United Kingdom) Frank Bird	(Belgium) Team WRT	Audi R8 LMS Evo	S	1:55.880; 1:57.004; 1:55.564	1:56.149	+1.516
31	69	(United Kingdom) Rob Collard (United Kingdom) Sam de Haan (Germany) Fabian Schiller	(United Kingdom) Ram Racing	Mercedes-AMG GT3 Evo	PA	1:57.198; 1:56.382; 1:55.035	1:56.205	+1.572
32	97	(Oman) Ahmad Al Harthy (Italy) Giacomo Petrobelli (Belgium) Maxime Martin	Oman Racing Team	Aston Martin Vantage AMR GT3	PA	1:57.021; 1:57.006; 1:54.800	1:56.275	+1.642
33	19	(United Kingdom) Phil Keen (Italy) Stefano Costantini (Japan) Hiroshi Hamaguchi	(China) FFF Racing Team	Lamborghini Huracán GT3 Evo	PA	1:55.756; 1:56.916; 1:56.181	1:56.284	+1.651
34	2	(France) Jim Pla (Luxembourg) Olivier Grotz (Germany) Florian Scholze	(Germany) GetSpeed Performance	Mercedes-AMG GT3 Evo	PA	1:55.757; 1:56.589; 1:56.812	1:56.386	+1.753
35	52	(Belgium) Louis Machiels (Switzerland) Lorenzo Bontempelli (Italy) Andrea Bertolini	(Italy) AF Corse	Ferrari 488 GT3 Evo 2020	PA	1:57.287; 1:56.892; 1:55.216	1:56.465	+1.832
36	20	(Austria) Dominik Baumann (Germany) Valentin Pierburg (Austria) Martin Konrad	(Germany) SPS Automotive Performance	Mercedes-AMG GT3 Evo	PA	1:55.311; 1:57.247; 1:56.894	1:56.484	+1.851
37	107	(France) Stéphane Tribaudini (South Africa) Stuart White (France) Pierre-Alexandre Jean	(France) Classic and Modern Racing	Bentley Continental GT3 (2018)	S	1:57.660; 1:56.573; 1:55.445	1:56.559	+1.926
38	188	(United Kingdom) Chris Goodwin (Sweden) Alexander West (United Kingdom) Jonathan Adam	(United Kingdom) Garage 59	Aston Martin Vantage AMR GT3	PA	1:57.051; 1:57.788; 1:55.025	1:56.621	+1.988
39	77	(Portugal) Henrique Chaves, Jr. (Switzerland) Adrian Amstutz (Portugal) Miguel Ramos	(United Kingdom) Barwell Motorsport	Lamborghini Huracán GT3 Evo	PA	1:55.528; 1:58.326; 1:56.906	1:56.920	+2.287
40	11	(Germany) Tim Kohmann (Italy) Francesco Zollo (Italy) Giorgio Roda	(Switzerland) Kessel Racing	Ferrari 488 GT3 Evo 2020	PA	1:56.421; 1:58.595; 1:56.382	1:57.132	+2.499
41	10	(Germany) Jens Liebhauser (Saudi Arabia) Karim Ojjeh (Germany) Jens Klingmann	(Belgium) Boutsen Ginion Racing	BMW M6 GT3	PA	1:58.770; 1:57.943; 1:56.573	1:57.762	+3.129
42	53	(United Kingdom) Duncan Cameron^{1} (Republic of Ireland) Matt Griffin	(Italy) AF Corse	Ferrari 488 GT3 Evo 2020	PA	1:59.779; 1:58.140; 1:55.991	1:57.969	+3.336
43	57	(United States) Russell Ward (Canada) Mikaël Grenier	(United States) Winward Motorsport	Mercedes-AMG GT3 Evo	S	No time No time No time	No time	
Sources:

- ^1 – Cameron contested Qualifying 1 and 2 for Car No. 53.

=== Race ===
Pos.	No.	Driver	Team	Car	Class	Lap	Time/Retired	Points
1	63	(Italy) Mirko Bortolotti (Italy) Marco Mapelli (Italy) Andrea Caldarelli	(China) FFF Racing Team	Lamborghini Huracán GT3 Evo	P	87	3:00:53.243	25
2	88	(Italy) Raffaele Marciello (Brazil) Felipe Fraga (France) Jules Gounon	(France) AKKA ASP	Mercedes-AMG GT3 Evo	P	87	+1.228	18
3	4	(Germany) Maro Engel (Germany) Luca Stolz (Germany) Nico Bastian	(Germany) Haupt Racing Team	Mercedes-AMG GT3 Evo	P	87	+7.847	15
4	163	(Austria) Norbert Siedler (Italy) Giacomo Altoè (Spain) Alberto Costa	(Switzerland) Emil Frey Racing	Lamborghini Huracán GT3 Evo	P	87	+13.240	12
5	114	(Finland) Konsta Lappalainen (Italy) Luca Ghiotto (France) Arthur Rougier	(Switzerland) Emil Frey Racing	Lamborghini Huracán GT3 Evo	P	87	+13.472	10
6	32	(Belgium) Dries Vanthoor (Belgium) Charles Weerts (Netherlands) Robin Frijns	(Belgium) Team WRT	Audi R8 LMS Evo	P	87	+18.939	8
7	51	(Italy) Alessandro Pier Guidi (France) Côme Ledogar (Denmark) Nicklas Nielsen	(Italy) Iron Lynx Motorsport Lab	Ferrari 488 GT3 Evo 2020	P	87	+20.827	6
8	14	(Switzerland) Alex Fontana (Switzerland) Rolf Ineichen (Switzerland) Ricardo Feller	(Switzerland) Emil Frey Racing	Lamborghini Huracán GT3 Evo	S	87	+21.371	25
9	99	(Germany) Dennis Marschall (Austria) Max Hofer (Germany) Alex Aka	(Germany) Attempto Racing	Audi R8 LMS Evo	S	87	+31.142	18
10	7	(Colombia) Óscar Tunjo (France) Paul Petit (Germany) Marvin Dienst	(Germany) Toksport	Mercedes-AMG GT3 Evo	S	87	+32.683	15
11	66	(Italy) Mattia Drudi (Austria) Nicolas Schöll (Germany) Christopher Mies	(Germany) Attempto Racing	Audi R8 LMS Evo	P	87	+34.412	4
12	34	(United Kingdom) Nick Yelloly (United Kingdom) David Pittard (United Kingdom) Jake Dennis	(Germany) Walkenhorst Motorsport	BMW M6 GT3	P	87	+35.743	2
13	30	(United Kingdom) James Pull (United Kingdom) Stuart Hall (Denmark) Benjamin Goethe	(Belgium) Team WRT	Audi R8 LMS Evo	S	87	+36.000	12
14	5	(Italy) Michele Beretta (Germany) Patrick Assenheimer (Germany) Hubert Haupt	(Germany) Haupt Racing Team	Mercedes-AMG GT3 Evo	S	87	+39.748	10
15	35	(Netherlands) Nick Catsburg (Germany) Martin Tomczyk (France) Thomas Neubauer	(Germany) Walkenhorst Motorsport	BMW M6 GT3	P	87	+40.520	1
16	31	(Japan) Ryuichiro Tomita (Denmark) Valdemar Eriksen (United Kingdom) Frank Bird	(Belgium) Team WRT	Audi R8 LMS Evo	S	86	+1 lap	8
17	90	(Argentina) Ezequiel Pérez Companc (Mexico) Ricardo Sánchez (Netherlands) Rik Breukers	(Argentina) Madpanda Motorsport	Mercedes-AMG GT3 Evo	S	86	+1 lap	6
18	26	(Germany) Markus Winkelhock (United Kingdom) Finlay Hutchison (Belgium) Frédéric Vervisch	(France) Saintéloc Racing	Audi R8 LMS Evo	P	86	+1 lap	
19	40	(Switzerland) Yannick Mettler (Australia) Jordan Love (Switzerland) Niklas Born	(Germany) SPS Automotive Performance	Mercedes-AMG GT3 Evo	S	86	+1 lap	4
20	159	(United Kingdom) Alex MacDowall (Denmark) Nicolai Kjærgaard (France) Valentin Hasse-Clot	(United Kingdom) Garage 59	Aston Martin Vantage AMR GT3	S	86	+1 lap	2
21	19	(United Kingdom) Phil Keen (Italy) Stefano Costantini (Japan) Hiroshi Hamaguchi	(China) FFF Racing Team	Lamborghini Huracán GT3 Evo	PA	86	+1 lap	25
22	93	(Italy) Rino Mastronardi (Hong Kong) Jonathan Hui (United Kingdom) Chris Froggatt	(United Kingdom) Tempesta Racing	Ferrari 488 GT3 Evo 2020	PA	86	+1 lap	18
23	69	(United Kingdom) Rob Collard (United Kingdom) Sam de Haan (Germany) Fabian Schiller	(United Kingdom) Ram Racing	Mercedes-AMG GT3 Evo	PA	86	+1 lap	15
24	57	(United States) Russell Ward (Canada) Mikaël Grenier	(United States) Winward Motorsport	Mercedes-AMG GT3 Evo	S	86	+1 lap	1
25	77	(Portugal) Henrique Chaves, Jr. (Switzerland) Adrian Amstutz (Portugal) Miguel Ramos	(United Kingdom) Barwell Motorsport	Lamborghini Huracán GT3 Evo	PA	86	+1 lap	12
26	97	(Oman) Ahmad Al Harthy (Italy) Giacomo Petrobelli (Belgium) Maxime Martin	Oman Racing Team	Aston Martin Vantage AMR GT3	PA	86	+1 lap	10
27	20	(Austria) Dominik Baumann (Germany) Valentin Pierburg (Austria) Martin Konrad	(Germany) SPS Automotive Performance	Mercedes-AMG GT3 Evo	PA	86	+1 lap	8
28	107	(France) Stéphane Tribaudini (South Africa) Stuart White (France) Pierre-Alexandre Jean	(France) Classic and Modern Racing	Bentley Continental GT3 (2018)	S	86	+1 lap	
29	2	(France) Jim Pla (Luxembourg) Olivier Grotz (Germany) Florian Scholze	(Germany) GetSpeed Performance	Mercedes-AMG GT3 Evo	PA	86	+1 lap	6
30	52	(Belgium) Louis Machiels (Switzerland) Lorenzo Bontempelli (Italy) Andrea Bertolini	(Italy) AF Corse	Ferrari 488 GT3 Evo 2020	PA	86	+1 lap	4
31	188	(United Kingdom) Chris Goodwin (Sweden) Alexander West (United Kingdom) Jonathan Adam	(United Kingdom) Garage 59	Aston Martin Vantage AMR GT3	PA	86	+1 lap	2
32	33	(South Africa) David Perel (Chile) Benjamín Hites (Finland) Patrick Kujala	(Germany) Rinaldi Racing	Ferrari 488 GT3 Evo 2020	S	85	+2 laps	
33	11	(Germany) Tim Kohmann (Italy) Francesco Zollo (Italy) Giorgio Roda	(Switzerland) Kessel Racing	Ferrari 488 GT3 Evo 2020	PA	85	+2 laps	1
34	53	(United Kingdom) Duncan Cameron (Republic of Ireland) Matt Griffin	(Italy) AF Corse	Ferrari 488 GT3 Evo 2020	PA	85	+2 laps	
35	16	(Austria) Clemens Schmid (Italy) Emilian Galbiati (Germany) Tim Zimmermann	(Austria) Grasser Racing Team	Lamborghini Huracán GT3 Evo	S	84	+3 laps	
36	56	(Italy) Andrea Rizzoli (Denmark) Mikkel Pedersen (France) Romain Dumas	(Italy) Dinamic Motorsport	Porsche 911 GT3 R	P	83	+4 laps	
37	22	(Australia) Matthew Campbell (New Zealand) Earl Bamber (France) Mathieu Jaminet	(United Arab Emirates) GPX Martini Racing	Porsche 911 GT3 R	P	76	+11 laps	
38	71	(United Kingdom) Callum Ilott (Italy) Alessio Rovera (Italy) Antonio Fuoco	(Italy) Iron Lynx Motorsport Lab	Ferrari 488 GT3 Evo 2020	P	75	+12 laps	
39	222	(Denmark) Bastian Buus (Germany) Joel Sturm (Switzerland) Julian Apothéloz	(Germany) Allied Racing	Porsche 911 GT3 R	S	73	+14 laps	
40	54	(Italy) Matteo Cairoli (Austria) Klaus Bachler (Germany) Christian Engelhart	(Italy) Dinamic Motorsport	Porsche 911 GT3 R	P	72	+15 laps	
41	25	(France) Adrien Tambay (France) Alexandre Cougnaud (Germany) Christopher Haase	(France) Saintéloc Racing	Audi R8 LMS Evo	P	71	+16 laps	
42	10	(Germany) Jens Liebhauser (Saudi Arabia) Karim Ojjeh (Germany) Jens Klingmann	(Belgium) Boutsen Ginion Racing	BMW M6 GT3	PA	65	+22 laps	
DNF	87	(France) Thomas Drouet (France) Simon Gachet (Russia) Konstantin Tereshchenko	(France) AKKA ASP	Mercedes-AMG GT3 Evo	S	23		

Previous race: 2021 24 Hours of Spa	GT World Challenge Europe Endurance Cup; 2021 season	Next race: 2021 3 Hours of Barcelona
