= 2019 Ferrari Challenge Asia-Pacific =

The 2019 Ferrari Challenge Asia-Pacific was the 9th season of Ferrari Challenge Asia-Pacific. The season consisted of 7 rounds, starting at the Melbourne Grand Prix Circuit on March 15 and ending at the Mugello Circuit on October 27.

== Calendar ==
Rnd.	Circuit	Dates
1	(Australia) Melbourne Grand Prix Circuit	March 15–17
2	(Malaysia) Sepang International Circuit	April 19–21
3	(China) Shanghai International Circuit	May 24–27
4	(Japan) Twin Ring Motegi	July 5–7
5	(Japan) Fuji Speedway	August 30 – September 1
6	(Singapore) Marina Bay Street Circuit	September 20–22
7	(Italy) Mugello Circuit	October 24–27

== Entry list ==
All teams and drivers used the Ferrari 488 Challenge fitted with Pirelli tyres.

=== Trofeo Pirelli ===
Team	Driver	Class	Rounds
(Austria) Baron Motorsport	(Austria) Ernst Kirchmayr	Pro-Am	5–6
Blackbird Concessionaries Hong Kong	(Italy) Philippe Prette	Pro-Am	All
(United States) Ferrari of Cincinnati	(United States) James Weiland	Pro-Am	1–2
(United Kingdom) Graypaul Birmingham	(United Kingdom) Alex Moss	Pro-Am	7
(Switzerland) Kessel Racing	(China) Liu-Jin Xiao	Pro-Am	7
(China) Kunming Zhongzhuyuan DiLi Automotive	(Singapore) Leng-Hong Chong	Pro-Am	3
(Japan) M Auto Hiroshima	(Japan) "Go Max"	Pro-Am	All
(Japan) Rosso Scuderia	(Japan) Nobuhiro Imada	Pro-Am	2, 4–7
(Japan) Rosso Scuderia	(Japan) Yudai Uchida	Pro-Am	5
(Australia) Zagame Motorsport	(Republic of Ireland) Hector Lester	Pro-Am	1

=== Coppa Shell ===
Team	Driver	Class	Rounds
(United Arab Emirates) Al-Tayer Dubai	(Saudi Arabia) Abdulrahman Addas	Am	4, 6–7
(Japan) Auto Speciale	(Japan) Takehiro Takahashi	Am	5
Blackbird Concessionaries Hong Kong	(Hong Kong) Michael Choi	Pro-Am	All
Blackbird Concessionaries Hong Kong	(Hong Kong) Alex Fong	Am	3
Blackbird Concessionaries Hong Kong	(Hong Kong) Yui-Sum Fung	Am	3
Blackbird Concessionaries Hong Kong	(Hong Kong) Kenneth Lau	Am	2–4, 6–7
Blackbird Concessionaries Hong Kong	(Hong Kong) Kwan-Lum Pun	Pro-Am	1–2, 5–6
Blackbird Concessionaries Hong Kong	(Hong Kong) Vincent Wong	Pro-Am	1, 3–4, 6–7
Blackbird Concessionaries Hong Kong	(China) Ray Wu	Am	All
(Thailand) Cavallino Motors Bangkok	(Thailand) Kanthicha Chimsiri	Am	1–2, 4–7
(New Zealand) Continental Cars Auckland	(New Zealand) David Dicker	Pro-Am	All
(Japan) Cornes Osaka	(Japan) Atsushi Iritani	Am	1–2, 5, 7
(Japan) Cornes Osaka	(Japan) "Baby Kei"	Am	1, 3–4, 6
(Japan) Cornes Osaka	(Japan) Kazuyuki Yamaguchi	Pro-Am	All
(Japan) Cornes Shiba	(Japan) Hidekiho Hagiwara	Pro-Am	4
(Japan) Cornes Shiba	(Japan) Hiroyuki Kishimoto	Pro-Am	5
(Japan) Cornes Tokyo	(Japan) Makoto Fujiwara	Pro-Am	All
(China) CTF Beijing	(China) Bo-Yao Liang	Am	3
(China) CTF Beijing	(China) Yan-Sheng Liang	Am	1–6
(China) CTF Beijing	(China) Xiao Min	Am	All
(China) CTF Beijing	(China) Yan-Bin Xing	Pro-Am	All
(China) CTF Beijing	(China) Jing Zhang	Am	3
(China) Denker Guangzhou	(Hong Kong) Evan Mak	Am	3
(China) Denker Guangzhou	(China) Eric Zhang	Pro-Am	3
(Indonesia) Ferrari Jakarta	(Indonesia) Ahmad Sahroni	Am	1–4, 6
(Indonesia) Ferrari Jakarta	(Indonesia) Achmad Taufik	Am	2–4
(South Korea) Forza Motors Korea	(South Korea) Andrew Moon	Am	All
(South Korea) Forza Motors Korea	(South Korea) Jay Park	Pro-Am	All
(Japan) M Auto Hiroshima	(Japan) Ryuichi Kunihiro	Am	5
Modena Motori Taiwan	(Taiwan) Kent Chen	Am	1–2, 4–7
Modena Motori Taiwan	(Taiwan) Tsao-San Chuang	Am	2–3

== Results and standings ==
=== Race results ===
Round	Race	Circuit	Pole position	Fastest lap	Trofeo Pirelli Winners	Coppa Shell Winners
1	1	(Australia) Melbourne Grand Prix Circuit	TP Pro-Am: (Italy) Philippe Prette; CS Pro-Am: (Japan) Kazuyuki Yamaguchi; CS Am: (Taiwan) Kent Chen	TP Pro-Am: (Republic of Ireland) Hector Lester; CS Pro-Am: (Hong Kong) David Pun; CS Am: (Taiwan) Kent Chen	Pro-Am: (Japan) "Go Max"; M Auto Hiroshima	Pro-Am: (Japan) Kazuyuki Yamaguchi; Cornes Osaka; Am: Kent Chen; Modena Motori Taiwan
1	2	(Australia) Melbourne Grand Prix Circuit	TP Pro-Am: (Italy) Philippe Prette; CS Pro-Am: (China) Yan-Bin Xing; CS Am: (Japan) Atsushi Iritani	TP Pro-Am: (Italy) Philippe Prette; CS Pro-Am: (Japan) Kazuyuki Yamaguchi; CS Am: (South Korea) Andrew Moon	Pro-Am: (Italy) Philippe Prette; Blackbird Concessionaries Hong Kong	Pro-Am: (China) Yan-Bin Xing; CTF Beijing; Am: (South Korea) Andrew Moon; Forza Motors Korea
2	1	(Malaysia) Sepang International Circuit	TP Pro-Am: (Italy) Philippe Prette; CS Pro-Am: (China) Yan-Bin Xing; CS Am: (South Korea) Andrew Moon	TP Pro-Am: (Italy) Philippe Prette; CS Pro-Am: (China) Yan-Bin Xing; CS Am: (Hong Kong) Kenneth Lau	Pro-Am: (Italy) Philippe Prette; Blackbird Concessionaries Hong Kong	Pro-Am: (China) Yan-Bin Xing; CTF Beijing; Am: (South Korea) Andrew Moon; Forza Motors Korea
2	2	(Malaysia) Sepang International Circuit	TP Pro-Am: (Italy) Philippe Prette; CS Pro-Am: (Japan) Makoto Fujiwara; CS Am: (South Korea) Andrew Moon	TP Pro-Am: (Italy) Philippe Prette; CS Pro-Am: (Japan) Makoto Fujiwara; CS Am: (Hong Kong) Kenneth Lau	Pro-Am: (Italy) Philippe Prette; Blackbird Concessionaries Hong Kong	Pro-Am: (Japan) Makoto Fujiwara; Cornes Tokyo; Am: (South Korea) Andrew Moon; Forza Motors Korea
3	1	(China) Shanghai International Circuit	TP Pro-Am: (Italy) Philippe Prette; CS Pro-Am: (China) Eric Zhang; CS Am: (South Korea) Andrew Moon	TP Pro-Am: (Italy) Philippe Prette; CS Pro-Am: (China) Eric Zhang; CS Am: (South Korea) Andrew Moon	Pro-Am: (Italy) Philippe Prette; Blackbird Concessionaries Hong Kong	Pro-Am: (China) Eric Zhang; Denker Guangzhou; Am: (South Korea) Andrew Moon; Forza Motors Korea
3	2	(China) Shanghai International Circuit	TP Pro-Am: (Italy) Philippe Prette; CS Pro-Am: (China) Eric Zhang; CS Am: (South Korea) Andrew Moon	TP Pro-Am: (Japan) "Go Max"; CS Pro-Am: (China) Eric Zhang; CS Am: (Japan) "Baby Kei"	Pro-Am: (Italy) Philippe Prette; Blackbird Concessionaries Hong Kong	Pro-Am: (China) Eric Zhang; Denker Guangzhou; Am: (South Korea) Andrew Moon; Forza Motors Korea
4	1	(Japan) Twin Ring Motegi	TP Pro-Am: (Japan) Nobuhiro Imada; CS Pro-Am: (Hong Kong) Michael Choi; CS Am: (Taiwan) Kent Chen	TP Pro-Am: (Japan) Nobuhiro Imada; CS Pro-Am: (Japan) Makoto Fujiwara; CS Am: (Hong Kong) Kenneth Lau	Pro-Am: (Japan) Nobuhiro Imada; Rosso Scuderia	Pro-Am: (Japan) Makoto Fujiwara; Cornes Tokyo; Am: Kenneth Lau; Blackbird Concessionaries Hong Kong
4	2	(Japan) Twin Ring Motegi	TP Pro-Am: (Japan) "Go Max"; CS Pro-Am: (South Korea) Jay Park; CS Am: (Taiwan) Kent Chen	TP Pro-Am: (Italy) Philippe Prette; CS Pro-Am: (Japan) Makoto Fujiwara; CS Am: (Hong Kong) Kenneth Lau	Pro-Am: (Italy) Philippe Prette; Blackbird Concessionaries Hong Kong	Pro-Am: Michael Choi; Blackbird Concessionaries Hong Kong; Am: Kenneth Lau; Blackbird Concessionaires Hong Kong
5	1	(Japan) Fuji Speedway	TP Pro-Am: (Japan) Yudai Uchida; CS Pro-Am: (Japan) Makoto Fujiwara; CS Am: (South Korea) Andrew Moon	TP Pro-Am: (Japan) "Go Max"; CS Pro-Am: (Japan) Makoto Fujiwara; CS Am: (South Korea) Andrew Moon	Pro-Am: (Japan) "Go Max"; M Auto Hiroshima	Pro-Am: (Japan) Makoto Fujiwara; Cornes Tokyo; Am: (South Korea) Andrew Moon; Forza Motors Korea
5	2	(Japan) Fuji Speedway	TP Pro-Am: (Japan) Yudai Uchida; CS Pro-Am: (Japan) Makoto Fujiwara; CS Am: (South Korea) Andrew Moon	TP Pro-Am: (Japan) Yudai Uchida; CS Pro-Am: (Japan) Makoto Fujiwara; CS Am: (Japan) "Baby Kei"	Pro-Am: (Japan) Yudai Uchida; Rosso Scuderia	Pro-Am: (Japan) Makoto Fujiwara; Cornes Tokyo; Am: (South Korea) Andrew Moon; Forza Motors Korea
6	1	(Singapore) Marina Bay Street Circuit	TP Pro-Am: (Italy) Philippe Prette; CS Pro-Am: (Hong Kong) David Pun; CS Am: (South Korea) Andrew Moon	TP Pro-Am: (Italy) Philippe Prette; CS Pro-Am: (Japan) Kazuyuki Yamaguchi; CS Am: (Japan) "Baby Kei"	Pro-Am: (Italy) Philippe Prette; Blackbird Concessionaries Hong Kong	Pro-Am: (Japan) Kazuyuki Yamaguchi; Cornes Osaka; Am: (South Korea) Andrew Moon; Forza Motors Korea
6	2	(Singapore) Marina Bay Street Circuit	TP Pro-Am: (Italy) Philippe Prette; CS Pro-Am: (Hong Kong) David Pun; CS Am: (South Korea) Andrew Moon	TP Pro-Am: (Italy) Philippe Prette; CS Pro-Am: (Hong Kong) Vincent Wong; CS Am: (Hong Kong) Kenneth Lau	Pro-Am: (Italy) Philippe Prette; Blackbird Concessionaries Hong Kong	Pro-Am: (Japan) Kazuyuki Yamaguchi; Cornes Osaka; Am: (China) Ray Wu; Blackbird Concessionaries Hong Kong
7	1	(Italy) Mugello Circuit	TP Pro-Am: (Italy) Philippe Prette; CS Pro-Am: (China) Yan-Bin Xing; CS Am: (China) Ray Wu	TP Pro-Am: (Italy) Philippe Prette; CS Pro-Am: (Japan) Makoto Fujiwara; CS Am: (South Korea) Andrew Moon	Pro-Am: (Japan) "Go Max"; M Auto Hiroshima	Pro-Am: (Japan) Makoto Fujiwara; Cornes Tokyo; Am: Kent Chen; Modena Motori Taiwan
7	2	(Italy) Mugello Circuit	TP Pro-Am: (Italy) Philippe Prette; CS Pro-Am: (Japan) Makoto Fujiwara; CS Am: (China) Ray Wu	TP Pro-Am: (Italy) Philippe Prette; CS Pro-Am: (South Korea) Jay Park; CS Am: (China) Ray Wu	Pro-Am: (Italy) Philippe Prette; Blackbird Concessionaries Hong Kong	Pro-Am: (Japan) Makoto Fujiwara; Cornes Tokyo; Am: (China) Ray Wu; Blackbird Concessionaries Hong Kong

=== Championship standings ===
Points were awarded to the top ten classified finishers as follows:

Race Position	1st	2nd	3rd	4th	5th	6th	7th	8th	9th or lower	Pole	FLap	Entry
Points	20	15	12	10	8	6	4	2	1	1	1	1

Trofeo Pirelli

Pos.	Driver	(Australia) MEL		(Malaysia) SEP		(China) SHA		(Japan) MOT		(Japan) FUJ		(Singapore) SGP		(Italy) MUG		Points
Pos.	Driver	R1	R2	R1	R2	R1	R2	R1	R2	R1	R2	R1	R2	R1	R2	Points
Pro-Am Class
1	(Italy) Philippe Prette	3	1	1	1	1	1	2	1	4	4	1	1	2	1	267
2	(Japan) "Go Max"	1	3	2	Ret	2	3	3	2	1	2	2	2	1	2	211
3	(Japan) Nobuhiro Imada			4	3			1	Ret	3	3	4	3	3	3	119
4	(United States) James Weiland	4	2	3	2											55
5	(Austria) Ernst Kirchmayr									5	5	3	4			40
6	(Japan) Yudai Uchida									2	1					39
7	(Singapore) Leng-Hong Chong					3	2									28
8	(Republic of Ireland) Hector Lester	2	4													27
9	(China) Liu-Jin Xiao													4	4	21
10	(United Kingdom) Alex Moss													5	5	17

Coppa Shell

Pos.	Driver	(Australia) MEL		(Malaysia) SEP		(China) SHA		(Japan) MOT		(Japan) FUJ		(Singapore) SGP		(Italy) MUG		Points
Pos.	Driver	R1	R2	R1	R2	R1	R2	R1	R2	R1	R2	R1	R2	R1	R2	Points
Pro-Am Class
1	(Japan) Makoto Fujiwara	Ret	5	DNS	1	2	6	1	6	1	1	5	3	1	1	196
2	(Japan) Kazuyuki Yamaguchi	1	4	3	4	4	4	5	3	Ret	4	1	1	2	2	189
3	(China) Yan-Bin Xing	4	1	1	3	6	5	3	4	2	2	3	Ret	3	DSQ	163
4	(Hong Kong) Michael Choi	3	2	2	7	3	2	2	1	3	7	6	4	5	Ret	156
5	(South Korea) Jay Park	5	DNS	4	5	5	3	7	2	5	6	4	5	4	3	151
6	(New Zealand) David Dicker	6	6	5	6	7	Ret	4	5	4	5	8	Ret	6	Ret	84
7	(Hong Kong) Kwan-Lum Pun	2	3	Ret	2					Ret	Ret	2	2			79
8	(China) Eric Zhang					1	1									45
9	(Hong Kong) Vincent Wong	Ret	7			8	DNS	8	DNS			7	6	7	DNS	29
10	(Japan) Hiroyuki Kishimoto									Ret	3					17
11	(Japan) Hidekiho Hagiwara							6	7							11
Am Class
1	(South Korea) Andrew Moon	4	1	1	1	1	1	Ret	3	1	1	1	Ret	2	Ret	209
2	(Taiwan) Kent Chen	1	Ret	2	4			2	2	Ret	4	3	2	1	3	154
3	(China) Xiao Min	3	3	5	6	3	3	4	4	4	7	6	5	5	7	127
4	(China) Ray Wu	6	5	7	3	5	6	7	10	Ret	5	5	1	6	1	118
5	(Hong Kong) Kenneth Lau			4	2	DNS	13	1	1			4	3	4	4	117
6	(Japan) "Baby Kei"	2	2			4	7	3	5			2	Ret			82
7	(Japan) Atsushi Iritani	Ret	Ret	3	7					2	2			3	2	77
8	(Indonesia) Ahmad Sahroni	5	4	DNS	5	7	DNS	6	DNS			7	4			51
9	(Thailand) Kanthicha Chimsiri	8	6	9	8			9	8	7	8	10	8	7	6	43
10	(China) Yan-Sheng Liang	7	7	8	DNS	10	10	8	6	6	9	9	7			40
11	(Saudi Arabia) Abdulrahman Addas							5	7			8	6	Ret	5	32
12	(Hong Kong) Evan Mak					2	2									31
13	(Japan) Ryuichi Kunihiro									5	3					21
=	(Indonesia) Achmad Taufik			6	DNS	DNS	4	DNS	9							21
15	(Japan) Takehiro Takahashi									3	6					19
16	(China) Bo-Yao Liang					6	5									15
17	(Hong Kong) Yui-Sum Fung					8	8									7
18	(Taiwan) Tsao-San Chuang			10	9	11	11									5
=	(Hong Kong) Alex Fong					9	9									5
20	(China) Jing Zhang					12	12									1

== See also ==
- 2019 Finali Mondiali
