= Benjamín Hites =

Chilean racing driver

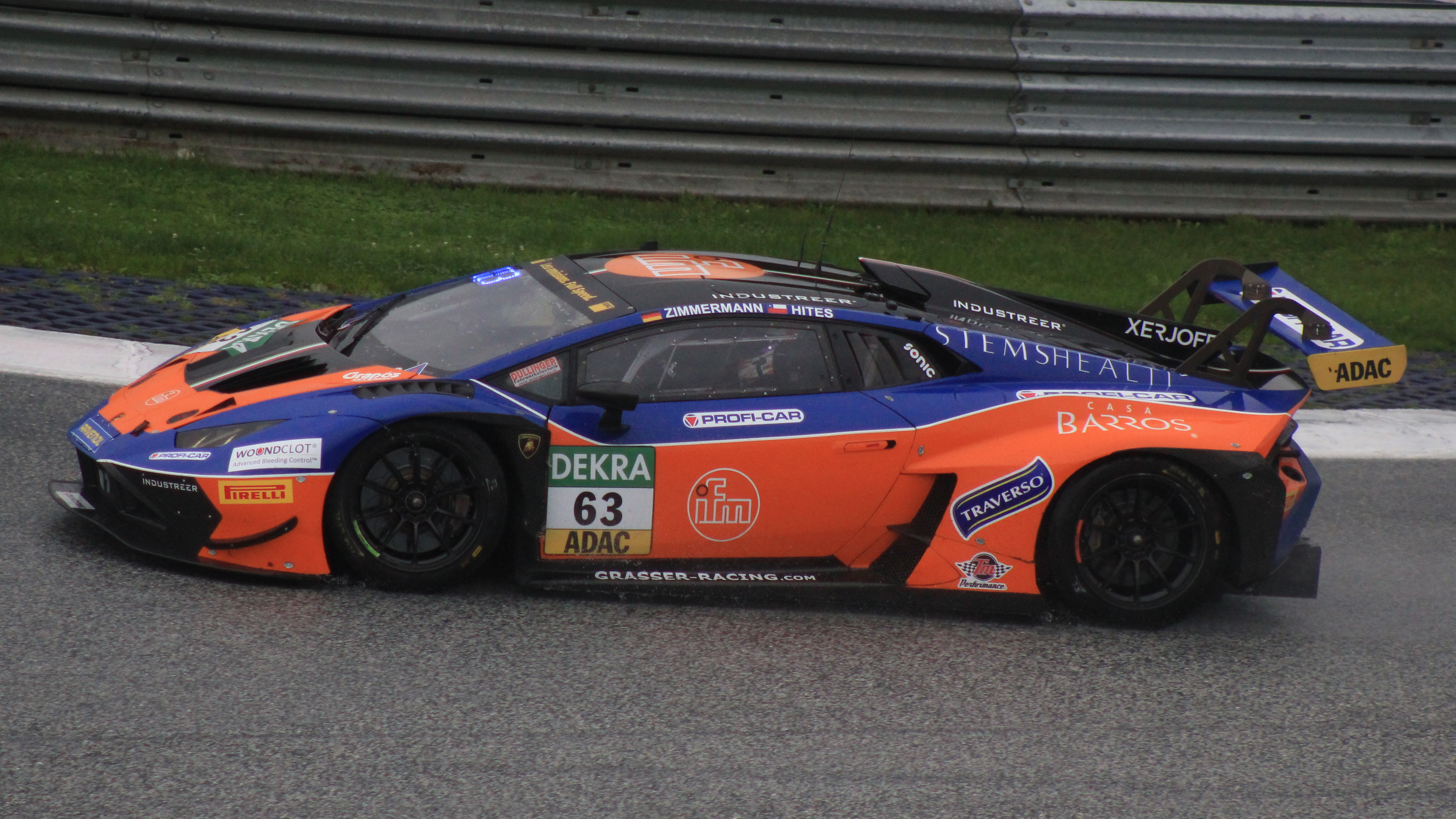
- Nationality: (Chile) Chilean
- Born: Benjamin Hites Michelson; 3 May 1999 (age 27) Santiago, Chile

ADAC GT Masters career
- Debut season: 2023
- Current team: Grasser Racing Team
- Categorisation: FIA Silver
- Starts: 24 (24 entries)
- Wins: 2
- Podiums: 4
- Poles: 6
- Fastest laps: 1

Benjamín Hites Michelson (born 3 May 1999) is a Chilean racing driver who competes in the Nürburgring Langstrecken-Serie for PROsport Racing in the SP10 class, and in the TC2000 Championship for Corsi Sport. Hites won the 24 Hours of Spa-Francorchamps in 2023, in the Silver category.

== Career ==
=== Top Race Argentina ===
Hites began his racing career in 2017, competing in Top Race Argentina for RV Competición. The only amassed two points finishes during the season, a ninth place at the first round in San Juan, and a tenth place at the third round in Rosario. He finished the championship in 23rd position with three points.

Hites switched to Fiat Octanos for the 2018 season and only got one point finish at the fourth round in San Juan, finishing his sophomore campaign with a lone points and 25th in the drivers' championship.

Hites' final season in 2019 would be his best, competing for Fiat Racing Team TopRace, the Chilean achieved his first podium at Salta then a maiden win at Olavarría. After two second places at Concordia, and a podium at the first race of the final round in Buenos Aires, he won the final race of the season. Hites finished the championship in fourth position with 142 points, two wins, four podiums and one fastest lap.

=== Ferrari Challenge ===
For 2018, Hites made his debut in the Ferrari Challenge North America - Trofeo Pirelli for The Collection. He achieved his first podium in the first race of the second round at Circuit of the Americas. Hites followed this momentum by capturing his maiden car racing win in the second race.

At the fourth round, Hites suffered a double retirement at Montreal, two rounds later he picked up a double podium at Road Atlanta, and at the final race of the season at Monza Circuit, Hites got his second win in the series. He finished his maiden year in third place with 130 points, two wins and five podiums.

For the 2019 season, Hites competed with The Collection for a second season and fought for the title with 2018 champion Cooper MacNeil, Hites won the first race at the Circuit of the Americas and won at Sebring after starting from pole position, his only retirement and non podium finish of the season was at Laguna Seca. He won four straight races from Indianapolis to Homestead–Miami, entering the final round at Mugello Circuit he broke his win streak by finishing in second place in the first race, but won the final race.

Hites came runner-up to the championship, with 243 points compared to MacNeil's 250 points. The Chilean acclimated, seven wins, thirteen podiums and four pole position during his title fight.

At the end of the season, Hites competed in the Ferrari Challenge Finali Mondiali - Trofeo Pirelli but was unable to start the race.

=== GT World Challenge Europe ===
Hites was announced to be competing in the Silver category of the 2020 GT World Challenge Europe Endurance Cup and 2020 GT World Challenge Europe Sprint Cup for AKKA ASP Team.

In the Sprint Cup, which Hites contested alongside Jim Pla, after a different second and third race in the first round at Misano, they claimed a third place in the next race in their class at Magny-Cours. A round later, they got their first pole in the series in the first race at Zandvoort, but failed to capitalise on it. For the final round at Barcelona, they got a second podium and a win a race later. The duo finished fifth in their class with 66.5 points.

Meanwhile, in the Endurance Cup, where joined Swiss drivers Lucas Légeret and Alex Fontana, the trio had a successful season despite not claiming any podiums, but got pole position in the 2020 24 Hours of Spa. They finished 11th in the Silver category with 32 points to their name.

For 2021, Hites switched to Rinaldi Racing in both the 2021 GT World Challenge Europe Endurance Cup and 2021 GT World Challenge Europe Sprint Cup but remained in the Silver category.

Hites came 17th in the Endurance Cup in his category and amassed only 28 points, he retired at Paul Ricard and failed to score points at the Nürburgring.

Hites had a more successful campaign in the Sprint Cup, only having one race out of the points, which was a retirement at Zandvoort. The highlight of his season was a pole position and second place at Misano. Hites finished ninth in the Silver category with 45 points to his name.

Hites only competed in the Endurance Cup for 2021, where he switched to Vincenzo Sospiri Racing and competed in the Silver category with Michele Beretta and Yuki Nemoto. The trio had a consistent year and finished every race in the points, barring the second round at Paul Ricard, where they retired from the race. Hites, Beretta and Nemoto finished 12th in their class with 28 points.

For his 2023 campaign, Hites swapped to GRT Grasser Racing Team and remained in the Silver category. After retiring from the first race at Monza, he and his teammates didn't drop out of the top two for every race and also claimed pole position in the rest of the races they competed in except for the 24 Hours Spa, which they won in their class. The trio picked up a second win a round later at the Nürburgring. They undoubtedly won the title with 116 points.

=== International GT Open ===
Alongside Fabrizio Crestani, Hites made a cameo in the sixth round of the 2021 International GT Open with Rinaldi Racing at Monza Circuit. After a fourth place in their debut race, they stormed to an unexpected victory in a wet weather race in the second race. They finished 15th in the drivers championship with 23 points.

Hites signed with Oregon Team for the 2022 International GT Open and competed in the championship full-time with Leonardo Pulcini. They won the first two races at Estoril and converted their maiden pole to a race win at the third round in Spa-Francorchamps. Hites and Pulcini got four more podiums in the second half of the season, amassing a podium and a win at the Red Bull Ring, and two more second-place finishes at Barcelona and Monza. The duo won the championship with 128 points, four wins, seven podiums and two pole positions.

=== IMSA SportsCar Championship ===
Hites made his IMSA SportsCar debut in the GTD class with NTE Sport in the final round of the season at the 2021 Petit Le Mans, partnering Jaden Conwright and Don Yount. The trio finished the race in a respectable ninth, with Hites finishing the drivers championship in 56th with 245 points.

Hites drove in the first round of 2022 IMSA SportsCar Championship at the 24 Hours of Daytona in the GTD class with NTE Sport/SSR, partnering Don Yount, Jaden Conwright and Markus Palttala. They retired from the race and Hites ended the championship in 66th with 163 points.

Hites started his 2023 campaign by competing in the first two races of the 2023 IMSA SportsCar Championship in the GTD class with Forte Racing powered by US RaceTronics. He came seventh in the 2023 24 Hours of Daytona and retired from the 2023 12 Hours of Sebring. Hites finished 43rd in the drivers championship with 421 points.

=== ADAC GT Masters ===
Hites made his debut in the 2023 ADAC GT Masters with GRT Grasser Racing Team, partnering Marco Mapelli. He and Mapelli had a successful campaign, finishing fourth in the championship after picking up four pole positions, three podiums and two wins in the second half of the season, whereas in the first half they got only one pole position in the first race at the Hockenheimring and no podiums. They were also disqualified from the first race at the Red Bull Ring and retired from the final race of the season at the Hockenheimring, which kept them from finishing top three in the drivers championship.

Hites continued with GRT Grasser Racing Team for the 2024 season where he partnered up with Tim Zimmermann for the season. The duo had a slightly unremarkable season compared to Hites' successful first year in the series. They managed to score only one podium – a second place – at the first race of the second round at Circuit Zandvoort and one pole position at the third race of the third round at the Nürburgring. Hites and Zimmermann inherited podium points at second race of the fourth round at Circuit de Spa-Francorchamps, due to the previous third-place finishers being ineligible for points. Zimmermann also wasn't available during the fifth round, so he was replaced with experienced driver Pierre Kaffer.

== Racing record ==
=== Racing career summary ===
Season	Series	Team	Races	Wins	Poles	F/Laps	Podiums	Points	Position
2017	Top Race Series Argentina	RV Competición	8	0	0	0	0	3	23rd
2018	Top Race Series Argentina	Fiat Octanos	9	0	0	0	0	1	25th
2018	Ferrari Challenge North America - Trofeo Pirelli	The Collection	14	2	0	1	5	130	**3rd**
2019	Top Race Series Argentina	Fiat Racing Team TopRace	14	2	0	1	6	142	4th
2019	Ferrari Challenge North America - Trofeo Pirelli	The Collection	14	7	4	5	13	243	**2nd**
2019	Ferrari Challenge Finali Mondiali - Trofeo Pirelli	The Collection	0	0	0	0	0	N/A	DNS
2020	Italian GT Endurance Championship - GT3	AKM Motorsport	1	0	0	0	0	0	NC
2020	GT World Challenge Europe Sprint Cup	AKKA ASP Team	9	0	0	0	0	14	17th
2020	GT World Challenge Europe Sprint Cup - Silver	AKKA ASP Team	9	1	1	0	3	66.5	5th
2020	GT World Challenge Europe Endurance Cup	AKKA ASP Team	4	0	0	0	0	0	NC
2020	GT World Challenge Europe Endurance Cup - Silver	AKKA ASP Team	4	0	1	1	0	32	11th
2020	Intercontinental GT Challenge	AKKA ASP Team	1	0	0	0	0	0	NC
2021	International GT Open	Rinaldi Racing	2	1	0	0	1	23	15th
2021	GT World Challenge Europe Sprint Cup	Rinaldi Racing	8	0	0	0	0	9.5	23rd
2021	GT World Challenge Europe Sprint Cup - Silver	Rinaldi Racing	8	0	1	0	1	45	9th
2021	GT World Challenge Europe Endurance Cup	Rinaldi Racing	5	0	0	0	0	0	NC
2021	GT World Challenge Europe Endurance Cup - Silver	Rinaldi Racing	5	0	0	0	0	28	17th
2021	Intercontinental GT Challenge	Rinaldi Racing	1	0	0	0	0	0	NC
2021	IMSA SportsCar Championship - GTD	NTE Sport	1	0	0	0	0	245	56th
2022	IMSA SportsCar Championship - GTD	NTE Sport/SSR	1	0	0	0	0	163	66th
2022	International GT Open	Oregon Team	13	4	2	1	7	128	**1st**
2022	GT World Challenge Europe Endurance Cup	Vincenzo Sospiri Racing	5	0	0	0	0	0	NC
2022	GT World Challenge Europe Endurance Cup - Silver	Vincenzo Sospiri Racing	5	0	0	0	0	28	12th
2022	Italian GT Endurance Championship - GT3 Pro	Vincenzo Sospiri Racing	3	1	1	0	2	41	4th
2022	Intercontinental GT Challenge	Vincenzo Sospiri Racing	1	0	0	0	0	0	NC
2022	Le Mans Cup - LMP3	TS Corse	2	0	0	0	0	0	NC
2023	IMSA SportsCar Championship - GTD	Forte Racing powered by US RaceTronics	2	0	0	0	0	421	43rd
2023	ADAC GT Masters	GRT Grasser Racing Team	12	2	5	1	3	157	4th
2023	GT World Challenge Europe Endurance Cup	GRT Grasser Racing Team	5	0	0	0	0	0	NC
2023	GT World Challenge Europe Endurance Cup - Silver	GRT Grasser Racing Team	5	2	3	3	4	116	**1st**
2024	ADAC GT Masters	GRT Grasser Racing Team	12	0	0	1	1	128	6th
2024	Nürburgring Langstrecken-Serie - BMW M240i	Adrenalin Motorsport Team Mainhatten Wheels	2	0	0	0	0	0	NC
2024	Nürburgring Langstrecken-Serie - SP8T	PROsport Racing	1	0	1	0	0	0	NC
2024	24 Hours of Nürburgring - SP10	PROsport Racing	1	0	0	0	0	0	4th
2025	Nürburgring Langstrecken-Serie - SP10	PROsport-Racing	3	0	0	0	2	0	NC
2025	Nürburgring Langstrecken-Serie - SP8T	PROsport-Racing	1	0	0	0	0	0	NC
2025	TCR South America Touring Car Championship	PMO Racing	2	0	0	0	1	38	18th
2026	Nürburgring Langstrecken-Serie - Cup2	Black Falcon Team Zimmermann	2	0	0	0	1	*	*

* Season still in progress.

=== Ferrari Challenge Finali Mondiali results ===
Year	Class	Team	Car	Circuit	Pos.
2019	**Trofeo Pirelli Pro**	(United States) The Collection	Ferrari 488 Challenge	(Italy) Mugello Circuit	DNS

=== Complete GT World Challenge Europe results ===
==== GT World Challenge Europe Endurance Cup ====
Year	Team	Car	Class	1	2	3	4	5	6	7	Pos.	Points
2020	AKKA ASP Team	Mercedes-AMG GT3	Silver	IMO; 38	NÜR; 38	SPA; 6H; 27	SPA; 12H; 39	**SPA**; **24H**; 29	LEC; 21		11th	32
2021	Rinaldi Racing	Ferrari 488 GT3 Evo 2020	Silver	MNZ; 17	LEC; Ret	SPA; 6H; 22	SPA; 12H; 17	SPA; 24H; 30	NÜR; 32	BAR; 17	17th	28
2022	Vincenzo Sospiri Racing	Lamborghini Huracán GT3 Evo	Silver	IMO; 24	LEC; Ret	SPA; 6H; 34	SPA; 12H; 25	SPA; 24H; 35	HOC; 25	CAT; 18	12th	28
2023	GRT Grasser Racing Team	Lamborghini Huracán GT3 Evo 2	Silver	MNZ; Ret	**LEC**; 17	SPA; 6H; 24	SPA; 12H; 20	SPA; 24H; 17	**NÜR**; 17	**CAT**; 17	1st	116

==== GT World Challenge Europe Sprint Cup ====
(key) (Races in bold indicate pole position) (Races in italics indicate fastest lap)

Year	Team	Car	Class	1	2	3	4	5	6	7	8	9	10	Pos.	Points
2020	AKKA ASP Team	Mercedes-AMG GT3 Evo	Silver	MIS; 1; 19	MIS; 2 Ret	MIS; 3 DNS	MAG; 1; 12	MAG; 2; 20	**ZAN**; **1**; 18	ZAN; 2; 9	CAT; 1; 4	CAT; 2; 6	CAT; 3; 9	5th	66.5
2021	Rinaldi Racing	Ferrari 488 GT3 Evo 2020	Silver	MAG; 1; 8	MAG; 2; 22	ZAN; 1 Ret	ZAN; 2; 8	MIS; 1; 11	**MIS**; **2**; 6	BRH; 1; 9	BRH; 2; 18	VAL; 1	VAL; 2	9th	45

=== Complete IMSA SportsCar Championship results ===
(key) (Races in bold indicate pole position; races in italics indicate fastest lap)

Year	Entrant	Class	Make	Engine	1	2	3	4	5	6	7	8	9	10	11	12	Rank	Points
2021	NTE Sport	GTD	Audi R8 LMS Evo	Audi 5.2 L V10	DAY	SEB	MDO	DET	WGL	WGL	LIM	ELK	LGA	LBH	VIR	PET; 9	56th	245
2022	NTE Sport/SSR	GTD	Lamborghini Huracán GT3 Evo	Lamborghini 5.2 L V10	DAY; 16	SEB	LBH	LGA	MDO	DET	WGL	MOS	LIM	ELK	VIR	PET	66th	163
2023	Forte Racing powered by US RaceTronics	GTD	Lamborghini Huracán GT3 Evo 2	Lamborghini DGF 5.2 L V10	DAY; 7	SEB; 17	LBH	LGA	WGL	MOS	LIM	ELK	VIR	IMS	ATL		43rd	421

=== Complete International GT Open results ===
(key) (Races in bold indicate pole position; results in italics indicate fastest lap)

Year	Entrant	Class	Chassis	1	2	3	4	5	6	7	8	9	10	11	12	13	14	Rank	Points
2021	Rinaldi Racing	Pro	Ferrari 488 GT3 Evo 2020	LEC; 1	LEC; 2	SPA; 1	SPA; 2	HUN; 1	HUN; 2	IMO; 1	IMO; 2	RBR; 1	RBR; 2	MNZ; 1; 4	MNZ; 2; 1	CAT; 1	CAT; 2	15th	23
2022	Oregon Team	Pro	Lamborghini Huracán GT3 Evo	EST; 1; 1	EST; 2; 1	LEC; 1; 8	LEC; 2; 6	**SPA**; 1	**HUN**; **1**; 8	HUN; 2; 13	RBR; 1; 2	RBR; 2; 1	MNZ; 1; 8	MNZ; 2; 2	CAT; 1; 2	CAT; 2; 5		1st	128

=== Complete ADAC GT Masters results ===
(key) (Races in bold indicate pole position) (Races in italics indicate fastest lap)

Year	Team	Car	1	2	3	4	5	6	7	8	9	10	11	12	DC	Points
2023	GRT Grasser Racing Team	Lamborghini Huracán GT3 Evo 2	**HOC1**; **1**; 8^{1}	HOC1; 2; 7	NOR; 1; 5^{3}	NOR; 2; 6	NÜR; 1; 6	**NÜR**; **2**; 1^{1}	SAC; 1; 7^{2}†	**SAC**; **2**; 2^{1}	**RBR**; **1** DSQ^{1}	RBR; 2; 8^{2}	**HOC2**; **1**; 1^{1}	HOC2; 2 Ret^{2}	4th	157
2024	GRT Grasser Racing Team	Lamborghini Huracán GT3 Evo 2	OSC; 1; 11^{2}	OSC; 2; 5	ZAN; 1; 2^{3}	ZAN; 2; 10	**NÜR**; **1**; 5^{1}	NÜR; 2; 14	SPA; 1; 8^{3}	SPA; 2; 4	RBR; 1; 14	RBR; 2; 9	HOC; 1; 9	HOC; 2; 5	6th	128
