= 2019 Finali Mondiali =

(Italy) 2019 Finali Mondiali
Event Information
- Date: 24–27 October
- Location: Scarperia e San Piero, Tuscany, Italy
- Venue: Mugello Circuit
- Weather: Sunny

Results
Race 1
| Distance | 13 laps | 68.185 km |
| Winner | (United Kingdom) Adam Carroll; Ferrari Budapest | 26:16.991 |
Race 2
| Distance | 13 laps | 68.185 km |
| Winner | (Italy) Emanuele-Maria Tabacchi; Rossocorsa | 26:38.139 |
Race 3
| Distance | 12 laps | 62.940 km |
| Winner | (United States) James Weiland; Rossocorsa | 26:25.078 |
Race 4
| Distance | 12 laps | 62.940 km |
| Winner | (Sweden) Ingvar Mattsson; Scuderia Autoropa | 26:19.683 |

The 2019 Finali Mondiali was the 2019 edition of the season-ending event for all Ferrari Challenge championships. Held at the Mugello Circuit in Italy for the first time since 2017, the event saw drivers from the Asia-Pacific, European and North American championships take part.

Two of the four reigning champions returned – with Trofeo Pirelli Pro and Coppa Shell Pro-Am champions Nicklas Nielsen and Christophe Hurni moved onto other championships. 2018 Trofeo Pirelli Pro-Am champion Fabienne Wohlwend moved into the Pro class, leaving just Coppa Shell Am champion Ingvar Mattsson to defend his title.

== Classification ==
=== Trofeo Pirelli ===
| Pos | Class | No. | Driver | Team | Laps | Time/Retired | Grid |
|---|---|---|---|---|---|---|---|
| 1 | Pro | 47 | (United Kingdom) Adam Carroll | (Hungary) Ferrari Budapest | 13 | 26:16.991 | 1 |
| 2 | Pro | 84 | (Germany) Björn Grossmann | (Switzerland) Octane126 | 13 | +0.421 | 5 |
| 3 | Pro | 3 | (Italy) Niccolò Schirò | (Italy) Rossocorsa | 13 | +6.558 | 3 |
| 4 | Pro | 5 | (Liechtenstein) Fabienne Wohlwend | (Switzerland) Octane126 | 13 | +12.011 | 8 |
| 5 | Pro | 6 | (France) Thomas Neubauer | (France) Charles Pozzi | 13 | +13.316 | 6 |
| 6 | Pro | 17 | (Italy) Louis Prette | (Denmark) Formula Racing | 13 | +14.998 | 2 |
| 7 | Pro | 93 | (United Kingdom) Chris Froggatt | (United Kingdom) HR Owen | 13 | +15.467 | 4 |
| 8 | Pro-Am | 33 | (Italy) Emanuele-Maria Tabacchi | (Italy) Rossocorsa | 13 | +21.148 | 9 |
| 9 | Pro-Am | 56 | (Slovakia) Matúš Vyboh | (Czech Republic) Scuderia Praha | 13 | +22.145 | 11 |
| 10 | Pro-Am | 97 | (Italy) Tommasco Rocca | (Italy) Rossocorsa | 13 | +26.695 | 15 |
| 11 | Pro-Am | 452 | (Japan) Nobuhiro Imada | (Japan) Rosso Scuderia | 13 | +28.696 | 18 |
| 12 | Pro | 213 | (Canada) Marc Muzzo | (Canada) Ferrari of Ontario | 13 | +38.494 | 19 |
| 13 | Pro-Am | 65 | (Denmark) Frederik Espersen | (Denmark) Forza Racing | 13 | +43.310 | 14 |
| 14 | Pro-Am | 45 | (Denmark) Christian Overgaard | (Denmark) Forza Racing | 13 | +44.855 | 22 |
| 15 | Pro-Am | 401 | (Italy) Philippe Prette | Blackbird Concessionaries Hong Kong | 13 | +48.450 | 12 |
| 16 | Pro-Am | 230 | (United States) David Musial | (United States) Ferrari Lake Forest | 13 | +48.675 | 21 |
| 17 | Pro-Am | 224 | (Lebanon) Ziad Ghandour | (United States) Boardwalk Ferrari | 13 | +1:18.027 | 16 |
| 18 | Pro-Am | 424 | (Japan) "Go Max" | (Japan) M Auto Hiroshima | 10 | +3 Laps | 13 |
| 19 | Pro | 225 | (United States) Ross Chouest | (United States) Ferrari of Palm Beach | 10 | +3 Laps | 17 |
| 20 | Pro-Am | 236 | (United States) Neil Gehani | (United States) Continental AutoSports | 9 | +4 Laps | 20 |
| DNF | Pro-Am | 223 | (United States) John Megrue | (United States) Ferrari of Long Island | 2 | | 24 |
| DNF | Pro | 92 | (United Kingdom) Sam Smeeth | (Austria) Baron Motorsport | 1 | | 7 |
| DNS | Pro | 233 | (Chile) Benjamín Hites | (United States) The Collection | 0 | | |
| DNS | Pro-Am | 26 | (United Kingdom) Franck Ruimy | (United Kingdom) HR Owen | 0 | | |
Fastest lap set by Björn Grossmann: 1:52.969

=== Coppa Shell Pro-Am ===
| Pos | Class | No. | Driver | Team | Laps | Time/Retired | Grid |
|---|---|---|---|---|---|---|---|
| 1 | Pro-Am | 118 | (United States) James Weiland | (Italy) Rossocorsa | 12 | 26:25.078 | 3 |
| 2 | Pro-Am | 157 | (Lebanon) Tani Hanna | (Denmark) Formula Racing | 12 | +3.831 | 1 |
| 3 | Pro-Am | 513 | (Japan) Makoto Fujiwara | (Japan) Cornes Shiba | 12 | +7.257 | 10 |
| 4 | Pro-Am | 351 | (Brazil) Claude Senhoreti | (United States) Ferrari of Fort Lauderdale | 12 | +9.275 | 7 |
| 5 | Pro-Am | 107 | (Japan) Ken Abe | (Denmark) Formula Racing | 12 | +17.694 | 9 |
| 6 | Pro-Am | 177 | (Netherlands) Fons Scheltema | (Switzerland) Kessel Racing | 12 | +23.582 | 11 |
| 7 | Pro-Am | 525 | (South Korea) Jae Park | (South Korea) Forza Motors Korea | 12 | +24.430 | 15 |
| 8 | Pro-Am | 328 | (United States) Brian Davis | (United States) Ferrari of Palm Beach | 12 | +24.950 | 17 |
| 9 | Pro-Am | 127 | (Sweden) Thomas Lindroth | (Austria) Baron Motorsport | 12 | +34.544 | 19 |
| 10 | Pro-Am | 568 | (China) Yan-Bin Xing | (China) CTF Beijing | 12 | +51.818 | 14 |
| 11 | Pro-Am | 128 | (Sweden) Christian Kinch | (Germany) Gohm Motorsport | 12 | +52.984 | 8 |
| 12 | Pro-Am | 550 | (Japan) Kazuyuki Yamaguchi | (Japan) Cornes Osaka | 9 | +3 Laps | 16 |
| DNF | Pro-Am | 120 | (Belgium) Guy Fawe | (Belgium) Scuderia FMA | 8 | | 18 |
| DNF | Pro-Am | 109 | (Austria) Ernst Kirchmayr | (Austria) Baron Motorsport | 1 | | 2 |
| DNF | Pro-Am | 133 | (Turkey) Murat Cuhadaroğlu | (Switzerland) Kessel Racing | 1 | | 6 |
| DNF | Pro-Am | 161 | (Italy) Thomas Gostner | (Italy) Ineco - MP Racing | 1 | | 4 |
| DNF | Pro-Am | 173 | (Italy) Corinna Gostner | (Italy) Ineco - MP Racing | 1 | | 13 |
| DNS | Pro-Am | 307 | (United States) Mark Issa | (United States) Ferrari of Atlanta | 0 | | |
| DNS | Pro-Am | 563 | (Hong Kong) Vincent Wong | Blackbird Concessionaries Hong Kong | 0 | | |
Fastest lap set by Tani Hanna: 1:54.138

=== Coppa Shell Am ===
| Pos | Class | No. | Driver | Team | Laps | Time/Retired | Grid |
|---|---|---|---|---|---|---|---|
| 1 | Am | 199 | (Sweden) Ingvar Mattsson | (Sweden) Scuderia Autoropa | 12 | 26:19.683 | 2 |
| 2 | Am | 132 | (Denmark) Henrik Jansen | (Denmark) Formula Racing | 12 | +1.034 | 1 |
| 3 | Am | 186 | (Poland) Agata Smolka | (Italy) Rossocorsa | 12 | +11.794 | 5 |
| 4 | Am | 196 | (Austria) Michael Simoncić | (Austria) Baron Motorsport | 12 | +13.312 | 7 |
| 5 | Am | 117 | (Czech Republic) Dušan Palcr | (Czech Republic) Scuderia Praha | 12 | +20.829 | 13 |
| 6 | Am | 581 | (Japan) Atsushi Iritani | (Japan) Cornes Osaka | 12 | +22.142 | 17 |
| 7 | Am | 134 | (France) "Alex Fox" | (France) Modena Motors - SLR | 12 | +25.623 | 11 |
| 8 | Am | 348 | (United States) Eric Marston | (United States) Ferrari Westlake | 12 | +25.837 | 14 |
| 9 | Am | 159 | (Germany) Matthias Moser | (Austria) Baron Motorsport | 12 | +28.509 | 12 |
| 10 | Am | 327 | (United States) Lisa Clark | (United States) Ferrari of Beverly Hills | 12 | +33.899 | 19 |
| 11 | Am | 112 | (Slovakia) Miroslav Vyboh | (Czech Republic) Scuderia Praha | 12 | +36.266 | 16 |
| 12 | Am | 318 | (United States) Robert Picerne | (United States) Ferrari of Central Florida | 12 | +41.182 | 21 |
| 13 | Am | 508 | (Hong Kong) Kenneth Lau | Blackbird Concessionaries Hong Kong | 12 | +41.556 | 18 |
| 14 | Am | 556 | (Saudi Arabia) Abdulrahman Addas | (United Arab Emirates) Al-Tayer Dubai | 12 | +42.236 | 20 |
| 15 | Am | 365 | (Canada) Gianni Grilli | (Canada) Ferrari of Quebec | 12 | +42.781 | 24 |
| 16 | Am | 172 | (Italy) Giuseppe Ramelli | (Italy) Rossocorsa | 12 | +43.809 | 9 |
| 17 | Am | 305 | (United States) Brad Horstmann | (United States) Foreign Cars Italia | 12 | +52.261 | 4 |
| 18 | Am | 555 | (China) Ray Wu | Blackbird Concessionaries Hong Kong | 12 | +58.913 | 10 |
| 19 | Am | 586 | (China) Min Xiao | (China) CTF Beijing | 12 | +59.791 | 23 |
| 20 | Am | 378 | (United States) Alan Hegyi | (United States) Ferrari of Newport Beach | 12 | +1:00.586 | 22 |
| 21 | Am | 599 | (Thailand) Kanthicha Chimsiri | (Thailand) Cavallino Motors Bangkok | 12 | +1:09.967 | 25 |
| 22 | Am | 308 | (United Kingdom) Mark Davies | (United States) Wide World Ferrari | 9 | +3 Laps | 15 |
| DNF | Am | 145 | (Belgium) Laurent de Meeus | (United Kingdom) HR Owen | 7 | | 6 |
| DNF | Am | 136 | (Austria) Alexander Nußbaumer | (Germany) Gohm Motorsport | 6 | | 3 |
| DNF | Am | 363 | (United States) Jay Schreibman | (United States) Ferrari of Detroit | 1 | | 8 |
| DNS | Am | 300 | (United States) Armin Oskouei | (United States) Ferrari of Atlanta | 0 | | |
Fastest lap set by Henrik Jansen: 1:54.617

== See also ==
- 2019 Ferrari Challenge Europe
- 2019 Ferrari Challenge North America
- 2019 Ferrari Challenge Asia-Pacific
