= Zekelman Industries =

Canadian company

Zekelman Industries is a Canadian industrial company owned by the Zekelman family, including billionaires Barry, Clayton, and Alan Zekelman. Zelelman owns several tube companies including Atlas Tube, a steel tubing manufacturer in Canada and the US.

== History ==
Zekelman Industries was founded as Atlas Tube in 1984 by Harry Zekelman. A majority stake was sold to the Carlyle Group in 2006 for $1.5 billion CND.

In 2006–2008, the Carlyle Group purchased John Maneely Co (founded in 1877) for $550 million, then purchased Atlas Tube, and Sharon Tube (founded in 1929), forming them into JMC Steel Group under DBO Holdings. Carlyle and Zekelman nearly sold them to Novolipetsk Steel (NLMK) for $3.5 billion in 2008, but the deal fell through in late 2008, with DBO/Carlyle suing NLMK for breach of contract. DBO/Carlyle and NLMK settled their lawsuit in 2009, with NLMK paying $234 million.

Picoma became part of JMC in 2009. Carlyle sold a majority stake to the Zekelman family in 2011. The company name was changed to Zekelman Industries in 2016.

In addition to Zekelman industries, co-owner Barry Zekelman is known for owning a series of super yachts and cigarette boats all named Man of Steel.

== Subsidiaries ==
Zekelman subsidiaries and locations include:

- Atlas Tube, Chicago, Illinois; Plymouth, Michigan; Blytheville, Arkansas; Harrow, Ontario; and Oak Bluff, Manitoba; naming of the Atlas Tube Centre
- Hayes Modular, Austin, Texas
- Picoma, Cambridge, Ohio
- Sharon Tube, Farrell, Pennsylvania and Niles, Ohio
- Western Tube, Long Beach, California, acquired in 2017
- Wheatland Tube (created as a subsidiary of John Maneely Co in 1931), Sharon, Pennsylvania and Wheatland, Pennsylvania
- Z Modular, based in Chicago; also Birmingham, Alabama; Killeen, Texas; Chandler, Arizona; and Kitchener, Ontario, created in 2016

== Political involvement ==
Zekelman Industries provides steel tubing to the US-Mexico border wall. A Zekelman Industries subsidiary, Wheatland Tube, donated $1.75 million to the America First Action super-PAC to elect Donald Trump, a financial maneuver considered questionable for a foreign citizen. Barry Zekelman dined with Donald Trump at a private Trump Hotel DC dinner by America First Action. Zekelman lobbied Trump regarding steel tariffs, the border wall, and trucking regulations.

As a foreign business executive trying to buy influence through spending on American elections, the Campaign Legal Center (CLC) filed a complaint against Zekelman with the Federal Election Commission in 2019. In April 2022, the F. E C. fined Zekelman $975,000 in the case, one of the biggest penalties it has ever assessed.

== See also ==
- Franklin Center (Chicago)
- List of wealthiest families
