= 2022 Global Touring Car Championship =

Motorsport season

The 2022 Global Touring Car Championship (commercially known as the 2022 Sasol GTC Championship) was the seventh season of the South African Global Touring Car Championship. The season was contested over seven rounds, starting at the Killarney Motor Racing Complex on March 4 and ending at the Zwartkops Raceway on October 15.

Robert Wolk claimed his second successive GTC championship and Leyton Fourie took the honours in the GTC Supacup class for the first time.

== Calendar ==
No.	Circuit	Dates	Map
1	Killarney Motor Racing Complex, Cape Town	March 5	2022 Global Touring Car Championship is located in South Africa
2	Zwartkops Raceway, Pretoria	April 23	2022 Global Touring Car Championship is located in South Africa
3	Aldo Scribante Circuit, Gqeberha	May 28	2022 Global Touring Car Championship is located in South Africa
4	Red Star Raceway, Delmas	July 2	2022 Global Touring Car Championship is located in South Africa
5	Prince George Circuit, East London	August 6	2022 Global Touring Car Championship is located in South Africa
6	Killarney Motor Racing Complex, Cape Town	September 17	2022 Global Touring Car Championship is located in South Africa
7	Zwartkops Raceway, Pretoria	October 15	2022 Global Touring Car Championship is located in South Africa

== Entry list ==
Drivers were split into two classes; GTC for silhouette racing cars and GTC Supacup for one-make Volkswagen Polos.

=== GTC ===
Team	Car	No.	Driver	Events
Chemical Logistics Racing	Toyota Corolla (E210)	1	(South Africa) Robert Wolk	All
Chemical Logistics Racing	Ford Focus Mk.4	33	(South Africa) Julian van der Watt	All
Toyota Gazoo Racing South Africa	Toyota Corolla (E210)	3	(South Africa) Saood Variawa	All
Toyota Gazoo Racing South Africa	Toyota Corolla (E210)	21	(South Africa) Mandla Mdakane	1-6
Toyota Gazoo Racing South Africa	Toyota Corolla (E210)	32	(South Africa) Ashley Oldfield	7
Toyota Gazoo Racing South Africa	Toyota Corolla (E210)	95	(South Africa) Michael van Rooyen	All
Universal Motorsport	Audi S3 Mk.4	12	(South Africa) Bradley Liebenberg	1-5, 7
Volkswagen Motorsport South Africa	Volkswagen Golf Mk.8	14	(South Africa) Jonathan Mogotsi	1-3
Volkswagen Motorsport South Africa	Volkswagen Golf Mk.8	43	(South Africa) Daniel Rowe	1-3
WCT Engineering	Audi S3 Mk.4	40	(South Africa) Andrew Rackstraw	All

=== GTC Supacup ===
Team	No.	Driver	Events
Campos Motorsport	2	(South Africa) Keegan Campos	1-4, 6-7
Campos Motorsport	29	(South Africa) Rui Campos	1-3, 6-7
Campos Motorsport	92	(South Africa) Jason Campos	1-4, 7
Perfect Circle Racing	4	(South Africa) Keagan Masters	1-5
Perfect Circle Racing	22	(South Africa) André Bezuidenhout	1-3
Perfect Circle Racing	41	(South Africa) Reghard Roets	6
Van Niekerk Racing	6	(Scotland) Paul Luti	1-2, 4-6
Van Niekerk Racing	9	(South Africa) Danie van Niekerk	All
Carello Auto/Dias Group	7	(South Africa) Calvin Dias	7
Carello Auto/Dias Group	100	(South Africa) Calvin Dias	1, 3
Carello Auto/Dias Group	100	(South Africa) Tato Carello	2, 4, 6-7
Carello Auto/Dias Group	146	(South Africa) Dominic Dias	7
Nathan Hammond Racing	10	(South Africa) Sam Hammond	1-2, 7
Nathan Hammond Racing	10	(South Africa) Damian Hammond	4-5
Nathan Hammond Racing	11	(South Africa) Nathan Hammond	1, 3-5, 7
Volkswagen Motorsport South Africa	14	(South Africa) Jonathan Mogotsi	4-7
Volkswagen Motorsport South Africa	33	(South Africa) Daniel Rowe	5-7
Rembrandt Racing	18	(South Africa) Dawie Joubert	1
Universal Motorsport	20	(South Africa) Jeffrey Kruger	All
Platinum Wheels	27	(South Africa) Jean-Pierre van der Walt	All
Pepper Racing	29	(South Africa) Iain Pepper	4, 6
Express Hire Pty Ltd	46	(South Africa) Leyton Fourie	All
Stradale Motorsport	54	(South Africa) Arnold Neveling	2-5, 7
Graphix Supply World	69	(South Africa) Roberto Franco	6
Graphix Supply World	96	(South Africa) David Franco	1, 6
Telerex	101	(South Africa) Stefan Snyders	1, 4, 6-7
Stu Davidson and Sons	522	(South Africa) Nick Davidson	All

== Results and standings ==
=== Race results ===
No.	Circuit	Date	Pole position	Fastest lap	Winning driver	Winning team
1	(South Africa) Killarney Motor Racing Complex	March 5	GTC: (South Africa) Robert Wolk; GTC SC: (South Africa) Keagan Masters	GTC: (South Africa) Robert Wolk; GTC SC: (South Africa) Keagan Masters	GTC: (South Africa) Robert Wolk; GTC SC: (South Africa) Keagan Masters	GTC: Chemical Logistics; GTC SC: Perfect Circle Racing
1	(South Africa) Killarney Motor Racing Complex	March 5		GTC: (South Africa) Robert Wolk; GTC SC: (South Africa) Keegan Campos	GTC: (South Africa) Julian van der Watt; GTC SC: (South Africa) Jeffrey Kruger	GTC: Auto Zone South Africa; GTC SC: Universal Motorsport
2	(South Africa) Zwartkops Raceway	April 23	GTC: (South Africa) Saood Variawa; GTC SC: (South Africa) Jeffrey Kruger	GTC: (South Africa) Robert Wolk; GTC SC: (South Africa) Jeffrey Kruger	GTC: (South Africa) Robert Wolk; GTC SC: (South Africa) Keagan Masters	GTC: Chemical Logistics; GTC SC: Perfect Circle Racing
2	(South Africa) Zwartkops Raceway	April 23		GTC: (South Africa) Julian van der Watt; GTC SC: (South Africa) Arnold Neveling	GTC: (South Africa) Julian van der Watt; GTC SC: (South Africa) Leyton Fourie	GTC: Auto Zone South Africa; GTC SC: Express Hire Pty Ltd
3	(South Africa) Aldo Scribante Circuit	May 28	GTC: (South Africa) Robert Wolk; GTC SC: (South Africa) Jeffrey Kruger	GTC: (South Africa) Bradley Liebenberg; GTC SC: (South Africa) Jeffrey Kruger	GTC: (South Africa) Robert Wolk; GTC SC: (South Africa) Jeffrey Kruger	GTC: Chemical Logistics; GTC SC: Universal Motorsport
3	(South Africa) Aldo Scribante Circuit	May 28		GTC: (South Africa) Daniel Rowe; GTC SC: (South Africa) Leyton Fourie	GTC: (South Africa) Michael van Rooyen; GTC SC: (South Africa) Leyton Fourie	GTC: Toyota Gazoo Racing South Africa; GTC SC: Express Hire Pty Ltd
4	(South Africa) Red Star Raceway	July 2	GTC: (South Africa) Bradley Liebenberg; GTC SC: (South Africa) Leyton Fourie	GTC: (South Africa) Bradley Liebenberg; GTC SC: (South Africa) Leyton Fourie	GTC: (South Africa) Bradley Liebenberg; GTC SC: (South Africa) Leyton Fourie	GTC: Universal Motorsport; GTC SC: Express Hire Pty Ltd
4	(South Africa) Red Star Raceway	July 2		GTC: (South Africa) Bradley Liebenberg; GTC SC: (South Africa) Leyton Fourie	GTC: (South Africa) Bradley Liebenberg; GTC SC: (South Africa) Jeffrey Kruger	GTC: Universal Motorsport; GTC SC: Universal Motorsport
5	(South Africa) Prince George Circuit	August 6	GTC: (South Africa) Bradley Liebenberg; GTC SC: (South Africa) Leyton Fourie	GTC: (South Africa) Saood Variawa; GTC SC: (South Africa) Jeffrey Kruger	GTC: (South Africa) Robert Wolk; GTC SC: (South Africa) Leyton Fourie	GTC: Chemical Logistics; GTC SC: Express Hire Pty Ltd
5	(South Africa) Prince George Circuit	August 6		GTC: (South Africa) Robert Wolk; GTC SC: (South Africa) Leyton Fourie	GTC: (South Africa) Michael van Rooyen; GTC SC: (South Africa) Jeffrey Kruger	GTC: Toyota Gazoo Racing South Africa; GTC SC: Universal Motorsport
6	(South Africa) Killarney Motor Racing Complex	September 17	GTC: (South Africa) Robert Wolk; GTC SC: (South Africa) Leyton Fourie	GTC: (South Africa) Saood Variawa; GTC SC: (South Africa) Jeffrey Kruger	GTC: (South Africa) Robert Wolk; GTC SC: (South Africa) Keegan Campos	GTC: Chemical Logistics; GTC SC: Campos Motorsport
6	(South Africa) Killarney Motor Racing Complex	September 17		unknown	GTC: (South Africa) Saood Variawa; GTC SC: (South Africa) Leyton Fourie	GTC: Toyota Gazoo Racing South Africa; GTC SC: Express Hire Pty Ltd
7	(South Africa) Zwartkops Raceway	October 15	GTC: (South Africa) Michael van Rooyen; GTC SC: (South Africa) Leyton Fourie	GTC: (South Africa) Robert Wolk; GTC SC: (South Africa) Leyton Fourie	GTC: (South Africa) Michael van Rooyen; GTC SC: (South Africa) Leyton Fourie	GTC: Toyota Gazoo Racing South Africa; GTC SC: Express Hire Pty Ltd
7	(South Africa) Zwartkops Raceway	October 15		GTC: (South Africa) Bradley Liebenberg; GTC SC: (South Africa) Jason Campos	GTC: (South Africa) Bradley Liebenberg; GTC SC: (South Africa) Jason Campos	GTC: Universal Motorsport; GTC SC: Campos Motorsport

=== Championship standings ===
Points system

Race Position	1st	2nd	3rd	4th	5th	6th	7th	8th	9th	10th	Pole	FL
Points	20	17	14	12	10	8	6	4	2	1	1	1

Drivers

Pos.	Driver	(South Africa) KIL1		(South Africa) ZWA1		(South Africa) ASC		(South Africa) RSR		(South Africa) PGC		(South Africa) KIL2		(South Africa) ZWA2		Points
Pos.	Driver	RD1	RD2	RD1	RD2	RD1	RD2	RD1	RD2	RD1	RD2	RD1	RD2	RD1	RD2	Points
GTC
1	(South Africa) Robert Wolk	1	2	1	7	1	4	2	3	1	2	1	2	3	4	239
2	(South Africa) Saood Variawa	8	5	2	2	2	2	4	2	2	7	2	1	2	2	208
3	(South Africa) Michael van Rooyen	4	7	4	3	6	1	DNF	7	4	1	3	5	1	7	161
4	(South Africa) Bradley Liebenberg	3	DNS	DNF	DNS	4	3	1	1	3	5	DNS	6	DNF	1	138
5	(South Africa) Julian van der Watt	6	1	8	1	9	8	3	5	6	4	4	DNF	DNF	3	129
6	(South Africa) Andrew Rackstraw	9	4	5	8	5	9	6	6	7	6	5	4	4	5	114
7	(South Africa) Mandla Mdakane	5	DNS	6	6	7	7	5	4	5	3	6	3			104
8	(South Africa) Daniel Rowe	2	3	7	5	3	5									70
9	(South Africa) Jonathan Mogotsi	7	6	3	4	8	6									52
10	(South Africa) Ashley Oldfield													5	6	10
GTC Supacup
1	(South Africa) Leyton Fourie	3	2	6	1	6	1	1	2	1	2	3	1	1	7	231
2	(South Africa) Jeffrey Kruger	2	1	DNF	3	1	5	2	1	2	1	6	3	4	3	209
3	(South Africa) Keegan Campos	4	4	4	10	3	3	5	3	DNS	DNS	1	2	7	6	141
4	(South Africa) Arnold Neveling			2	2	5	2	3	4	5	11	DNS	DNS	2	5	125
5	(South Africa) Keagan Masters	1	3	1	DNF	4	6	DNF	6	3	DNF					98
6	(South Africa) Jason Campos	6	5	DNF	4	2	4	DNF	DNF					5	1	90
7	(South Africa) Jonathan Mogotsi							7	DNF	4	3	2	DNF	3	2	80
8	(South Africa) Jean-Pierre van der Walt	7	7	5	5	7	7	4	8	8	6	10	13	8	13	77
9	(South Africa) Danie van Niekerk	5	6	7	7	8	9	9	5	7	5	4	DNF	13	11	76
10	(South Africa) Daniel Rowe									6	4	7	4	6	4	58
11	(South Africa) Tato Carello			3	6			6	7			9	13	9	10	41
12	(Scotland) Paul Luti	8	9	8	12			11	11	9	10	8	5			27
13	(South Africa) Nathan Hammond	DNS	DNS			9	8	12	9	12	7			12	8	18
14	(South Africa) Nick Davidson	10	8	9	8	12	11	10	13	11	9	12	10	17	15	15
15	(South Africa) Damian Hammond							8	10	10	8					11
16	(South Africa) Reghard Roets											5	11			10
17	(South Africa) Iain Pepper							13	14			DNF	6			8
18	(South Africa) Rui Campos			11	DNF	10	DNF					DNF	8	14	9	7
19	(South Africa) David Franco	11	DNF									13	7			6
20	(South Africa) André Bezuidenhout	DNS	DNF	10	9	13	DNF									3
=	(South Africa) Calvin Dias	9	10			15	12							11	12	3
22	(South Africa) Roberto Franco											11	9			2
23	(South Africa) Dominic Dias													10	17	1
NC	(South Africa) Sam Hammond	DNS	DNS	12	11									15	14	0
=	(South Africa) Stefan Snyders	12	DNS					14	12			DNF	DNF	16	16	0
=	(South Africa) Dawie Joubert	DNS	DNF													0
