= 2026 GT World Challenge Europe Endurance Cup =

Motorsports event

The 2026 GT World Challenge Europe Endurance Cup was the sixteenth season of the GT World Challenge Europe Endurance Cup since its inception in 2011 as the Blancpain Endurance Series. The season began on 11 April at Circuit Paul Ricard and finished on 17 October at the Algarve International Circuit.

== Calendar ==
The provisional calendar was released on 27 June 2025, featuring five rounds.

Round	Race	Circuit	Date	Map
1	6 Hours of Paul Ricard	Circuit Paul Ricard, Le Castellet, France	11–12 April	2026 GT World Challenge Europe Endurance Cup is located in Europe
2	3 Hours of Monza	Autodromo Nazionale Monza, Monza, Italy	30–31 May	2026 GT World Challenge Europe Endurance Cup is located in Europe
3	CrowdStrike 24 Hours of Spa	Circuit de Spa-Francorchamps, Stavelot, Belgium	25–28 June	2026 GT World Challenge Europe Endurance Cup is located in Europe
4	3 Hours of Nürburgring	Nürburgring, Nürburg, Germany	29–30 August	2026 GT World Challenge Europe Endurance Cup is located in Europe
5	3 Hours of Portimão	Algarve International Circuit, Portimão, Portugal	16–17 October	2026 GT World Challenge Europe Endurance Cup is located in Europe

== Entry list ==
Team	Car	No.	Drivers	Class	Rounds
(Malaysia) Johor Motorsports Racing JMR	Chevrolet Corvette Z06 GT3.R	0	(United Kingdom) Ben Green	PA	3
(Malaysia) Johor Motorsports Racing JMR	Chevrolet Corvette Z06 GT3.R	0	(Malaysia) Prince Abu Bakar Ibrahim	PA	3
(Malaysia) Johor Motorsports Racing JMR	Chevrolet Corvette Z06 GT3.R	0	(Malaysia) Prince Jefri Ibrahim	PA	3
(Malaysia) Johor Motorsports Racing JMR	Chevrolet Corvette Z06 GT3.R	0	(Australia) Jordan Love	PA	3
(Belgium) Boutsen VDS	Porsche 911 GT3 R (992.2)	2	(France) Dorian Boccolacci	P	All
(Belgium) Boutsen VDS	Porsche 911 GT3 R (992.2)	2	(Belgium) Alessio Picariello	P	All
(Belgium) Boutsen VDS	Porsche 911 GT3 R (992.2)	2	(Netherlands) Morris Schuring	P	All
(Belgium) Boutsen VDS	Porsche 911 GT3 R (992.2)	10	(Sweden) Robin Knutsson	G	All
(Belgium) Boutsen VDS	Porsche 911 GT3 R (992.2)	10	(Belgium) Gilles Magnus	G	All
(Belgium) Boutsen VDS	Porsche 911 GT3 R (992.2)	10	(France) Alessandro Ghiretti	G	1–3, 5
(Belgium) Boutsen VDS	Porsche 911 GT3 R (992.2)	10	(Germany) Nico Menzel	G	4
(Netherlands) Mercedes-AMG Team Verstappen Racing	Mercedes-AMG GT3 Evo	3	(United Kingdom) Chris Lulham	P	All
(Netherlands) Mercedes-AMG Team Verstappen Racing	Mercedes-AMG GT3 Evo	3	(Andorra) Jules Gounon	P	1–4
(Netherlands) Mercedes-AMG Team Verstappen Racing	Mercedes-AMG GT3 Evo	3	(Spain) Daniel Juncadella	P	1–4
(Netherlands) Mercedes-AMG Team Verstappen Racing	Mercedes-AMG GT3 Evo	3	(United Kingdom) Ben Barnicoat	P	5
(Netherlands) Mercedes-AMG Team Verstappen Racing	Mercedes-AMG GT3 Evo	3	(Netherlands) Max Verstappen	P	5
(Bahrain) 2 Seas Motorsport	Mercedes-AMG GT3 Evo	33	(United States) Jason Hart	B	3
(Bahrain) 2 Seas Motorsport	Mercedes-AMG GT3 Evo	33	(United States) Scott Noble	B	3
(Bahrain) 2 Seas Motorsport	Mercedes-AMG GT3 Evo	33	(United Kingdom) Aaron Walker	B	3
(Bahrain) 2 Seas Motorsport	Mercedes-AMG GT3 Evo	33	(United Kingdom) Lewis Williamson	B	3
(Bahrain) 2 Seas Motorsport	Mercedes-AMG GT3 Evo	222	(Republic of Ireland) Reece Barr	B	All
(Bahrain) 2 Seas Motorsport	Mercedes-AMG GT3 Evo	222	(United Kingdom) Charles Dawson	B	All
(Bahrain) 2 Seas Motorsport	Mercedes-AMG GT3 Evo	222	(United Kingdom) Kiern Jewiss	B	All
(Bahrain) 2 Seas Motorsport	Mercedes-AMG GT3 Evo	222	(Australia) Garnet Patterson	B	3
(United Kingdom) Optimum Motorsport	McLaren 720S GT3 Evo	4	(United Kingdom) Harry George	G	All
(United Kingdom) Optimum Motorsport	McLaren 720S GT3 Evo	4	(United Kingdom) Adam Smalley	G	All
(United Kingdom) Optimum Motorsport	McLaren 720S GT3 Evo	4	(United Kingdom) Freddie Tomlinson	G	All
(United Kingdom) Optimum Motorsport	McLaren 720S GT3 Evo	4	(Netherlands) Ruben del Sarte	G	3
(United Kingdom) Optimum Motorsport	McLaren 720S GT3 Evo	5	(Portugal) Guilherme Oliveira	S	All
(United Kingdom) Optimum Motorsport	McLaren 720S GT3 Evo	5	(United Kingdom) Mikey Porter	S	All
(United Kingdom) Optimum Motorsport	McLaren 720S GT3 Evo	5	(Netherlands) Dante Rappange	S	All
(United Kingdom) Optimum Motorsport	McLaren 720S GT3 Evo	5	(Germany) Salman Owega	S	3
(United States) GetSpeed Team Bartone Bros	Mercedes-AMG GT3 Evo	6	(United States) Anthony Bartone	S	All
(United States) GetSpeed Team Bartone Bros	Mercedes-AMG GT3 Evo	6	(France) César Gazeau	S	All
(United States) GetSpeed Team Bartone Bros	Mercedes-AMG GT3 Evo	6	(France) Aurélien Panis	S	All
(United States) GetSpeed Team Bartone Bros	Mercedes-AMG GT3 Evo	6	(Poland) Karol Basz	S	3
(United Arab Emirates) GetSpeed Team Dubai	Mercedes-AMG GT3 Evo	12	(Germany) Tom Kalender	B	All
(United Arab Emirates) GetSpeed Team Dubai	Mercedes-AMG GT3 Evo	12	(Luxembourg) Gabriel Rindone	B	All
(United Arab Emirates) GetSpeed Team Dubai	Mercedes-AMG GT3 Evo	12	(Canada) Mikaël Grenier	B	1–3, 5
(United Arab Emirates) GetSpeed Team Dubai	Mercedes-AMG GT3 Evo	12	(South Africa) Jarrod Waberski	B	3
(United Arab Emirates) GetSpeed Team Dubai	Mercedes-AMG GT3 Evo	12	(Australia) Jayden Ojeda	B	4
(Germany) Mercedes-AMG Team GetSpeed	Mercedes-AMG GT3 Evo	17	(Germany) Maximilian Götz	P	All
(Germany) Mercedes-AMG Team GetSpeed	Mercedes-AMG GT3 Evo	17	(Germany) Fabian Schiller	P	All
(Germany) Mercedes-AMG Team GetSpeed	Mercedes-AMG GT3 Evo	17	(Belgium) Maxime Martin	P	1–4
(Germany) Mercedes-AMG Team GetSpeed	Mercedes-AMG GT3 Evo	17	(Estonia) Ralf Aron	P	5
(United States) GetSpeed Team Noble Racing	Mercedes-AMG GT3 Evo	67	(Switzerland) Philip Ellis	B	1
(United States) GetSpeed Team Noble Racing	Mercedes-AMG GT3 Evo	67	(United States) Jason Hart	B	1
(United States) GetSpeed Team Noble Racing	Mercedes-AMG GT3 Evo	67	(United States) Scott Noble	B	1
(Germany) GetSpeed Team PCX Racing	Mercedes-AMG GT3 Evo	999	(France) Jordan Boisson	PA	3
(Germany) GetSpeed Team PCX Racing	Mercedes-AMG GT3 Evo	999	(France) Patrick Charlaix	PA	3
(Germany) GetSpeed Team PCX Racing	Mercedes-AMG GT3 Evo	999	(France) Marvin Klein	PA	3
(Germany) GetSpeed Team PCX Racing	Mercedes-AMG GT3 Evo	999	(Belgium) Benjamin Paque	PA	3
(Germany) GetSpeed Team PCX Racing	Mercedes-AMG GT3 Evo	999	(France) Jordan Boisson	B	5
(Germany) GetSpeed Team PCX Racing	Mercedes-AMG GT3 Evo	999	(France) Patrick Charlaix	B	5
(Germany) GetSpeed Team PCX Racing	Mercedes-AMG GT3 Evo	999	(France) Marvin Klein	B	5
(Belgium) Comtoyou Racing	Aston Martin Vantage AMR GT3 Evo	7	(Italy) Mattia Drudi	P	All
(Belgium) Comtoyou Racing	Aston Martin Vantage AMR GT3 Evo	7	(Denmark) Nicki Thiim	P	All
(Belgium) Comtoyou Racing	Aston Martin Vantage AMR GT3 Evo	7	(Denmark) Marco Sørensen	P	1–4
(Belgium) Comtoyou Racing	Aston Martin Vantage AMR GT3 Evo	7	(United Kingdom) Ross Gunn	P	5
(Belgium) Comtoyou Racing	Aston Martin Vantage AMR GT3 Evo	11	(United States) AJ Muss	B	All
(Belgium) Comtoyou Racing	Aston Martin Vantage AMR GT3 Evo	11	(Brazil) Marcelo Tomasoni	B	All
(Belgium) Comtoyou Racing	Aston Martin Vantage AMR GT3 Evo	11	(Canada) Kyle Marcelli	B	1–3
(Belgium) Comtoyou Racing	Aston Martin Vantage AMR GT3 Evo	11	(Italy) Felice Jelmini	B	3
(Belgium) Comtoyou Racing	Aston Martin Vantage AMR GT3 Evo	11	(Brazil) Sérgio Sette Câmara	B	4
(Belgium) Comtoyou Racing	Aston Martin Vantage AMR GT3 Evo	11	(France) Valentin Hasse-Clot	B	5
(Belgium) Comtoyou Racing	Aston Martin Vantage AMR GT3 Evo	18	(Spain) Mari Boya	P	1
(Belgium) Comtoyou Racing	Aston Martin Vantage AMR GT3 Evo	18	(Spain) Roberto Merhi	P	1
(Belgium) Comtoyou Racing	Aston Martin Vantage AMR GT3 Evo	18	(Canada) Lance Stroll	P	1
(Belgium) Comtoyou Racing	Aston Martin Vantage AMR GT3 Evo	21	(France) Sébastien Baud	S	All
(Belgium) Comtoyou Racing	Aston Martin Vantage AMR GT3 Evo	21	(Belgium) Kobe Pauwels	S	All
(Belgium) Comtoyou Racing	Aston Martin Vantage AMR GT3 Evo	21	(Sweden) Oliver Söderström	S	All
(Belgium) Comtoyou Racing	Aston Martin Vantage AMR GT3 Evo	21	(France) Arthur Dorison	S	3
(Belgium) Comtoyou Racing	Aston Martin Vantage AMR GT3 Evo	700	(Belgium) Nicolas Baert	PA	3
(Belgium) Comtoyou Racing	Aston Martin Vantage AMR GT3 Evo	700	(Belgium) Sarah Bovy	PA	3
(Belgium) Comtoyou Racing	Aston Martin Vantage AMR GT3 Evo	700	(Belgium) Xavier Knauf	PA	3
(Belgium) Comtoyou Racing	Aston Martin Vantage AMR GT3 Evo	700	(Belgium) Grégory Servais	PA	3
(Germany) Car Collection Motorsport	Porsche 911 GT3 R (992.2)	8	(Canada) Reinhold Krahn	PA	3
(Germany) Car Collection Motorsport	Porsche 911 GT3 R (992.2)	8	(Switzerland) Nicolò Rosi	PA	3
(Germany) Car Collection Motorsport	Porsche 911 GT3 R (992.2)	8	(Italy) Niccolò Schirò	PA	3
(Germany) Car Collection Motorsport	Porsche 911 GT3 R (992.2)	8	(Germany) Joel Sturm	PA	3
(Germany) Car Collection Motorsport	Porsche 911 GT3 R (992.2)	8	(Italy) Pietro Armanni	B	5
(Germany) Car Collection Motorsport	Porsche 911 GT3 R (992.2)	8	(Canada) Reinhold Krahn	B	5
(Germany) Car Collection Motorsport	Porsche 911 GT3 R (992.2)	8	(Germany) Joel Sturm	B	5
(Lithuania) Pure Rxcing	Porsche 911 GT3 R (992.2)	9	(Austria) Max Hofer	S	All
(Lithuania) Pure Rxcing	Porsche 911 GT3 R (992.2)	9	(United Kingdom) Alex Malykhin (Note: Malykhin is Belarusian, but he competed under a British licence as Belarusian national emblems were banned by the FIA following the Russian invasion of Ukraine. Although the ban was lifted on 13 August 2026, Malykhin retained his British licence.)	S	All
(Lithuania) Pure Rxcing	Porsche 911 GT3 R (992.2)	9	(Slovenia) Alexey Nesov (Note: Salikhov is Russian, but he competed as a neutral competitor at rounds 1–3 as Russian national emblems were banned by the FIA following the Russian invasion of Ukraine. Nesov, also a Russian, competed under a Slovene licence for the same reason. Although the ban was lifted on 13 August 2026, Nesov retained his Slovene licence.)	S	1–3
(Lithuania) Pure Rxcing	Porsche 911 GT3 R (992.2)	9	(Italy) Enzo Trulli	S	3
(Lithuania) Pure Rxcing	Porsche 911 GT3 R (992.2)	9	(Denmark) Mikkel O. Pedersen	S	4–5
(Austria) Team Motopark	Mercedes-AMG GT3 Evo	19	(Australia) Christian Mansell	S	5
(Austria) Team Motopark	Mercedes-AMG GT3 Evo	19	(Argentina) Marcos Siebert	S	5
(Austria) Team Motopark	Mercedes-AMG GT3 Evo	19	(United Kingdom) Aaron Walker	S	5
(Austria) Team Motopark	Mercedes-AMG GT3 Evo	20	(Angola) Rui Andrade	S	3
(Austria) Team Motopark	Mercedes-AMG GT3 Evo	20	(Australia) Christian Mansell	S	3
(Austria) Team Motopark	Mercedes-AMG GT3 Evo	20	(Switzerland) Yannick Mettler	S	3
(Austria) Team Motopark	Mercedes-AMG GT3 Evo	20	(Hungary) Levente Révész	S	3
(Austria) Team Motopark	Mercedes-AMG GT3 Evo	20	(Austria) Dominik Baumann	P	5
(Austria) Team Motopark	Mercedes-AMG GT3 Evo	20	(Switzerland) Philip Ellis	P	5
(Austria) Team Motopark	Mercedes-AMG GT3 Evo	20	(Russia) Nikita Mazepin	P	5
(France) Schumacher CLRT	Porsche 911 GT3 R (992.2)	22	(Australia) Matt Campbell	P	3
(France) Schumacher CLRT	Porsche 911 GT3 R (992.2)	22	(Turkey) Ayhancan Güven	P	3
(France) Schumacher CLRT	Porsche 911 GT3 R (992.2)	22	(France) Frédéric Makowiecki	P	3
(United Kingdom) Team RJN	McLaren 720S GT3 Evo	23	(Germany) Ben Dörr	S	All
(United Kingdom) Team RJN	McLaren 720S GT3 Evo	23	(United Kingdom) Horatio Fitz-Simon	S	All
(United Kingdom) Team RJN	McLaren 720S GT3 Evo	23	(United Kingdom) Max Lynn	S	All
(United Kingdom) Team RJN	McLaren 720S GT3 Evo	23	(United States) Wyatt Brichacek	S	3
(United Kingdom) Steller Motorsport	Chevrolet Corvette Z06 GT3.R	24	(Denmark) Dennis Lind	G	All
(United Kingdom) Steller Motorsport	Chevrolet Corvette Z06 GT3.R	24	(France) Antoine Doquin	G	1–4
(United Kingdom) Steller Motorsport	Chevrolet Corvette Z06 GT3.R	24	(Spain) Lorenzo Fluxá	G	1
(United Kingdom) Steller Motorsport	Chevrolet Corvette Z06 GT3.R	24	(Denmark) Mikkel Mac	G	2, 4–5
(United Kingdom) Steller Motorsport	Chevrolet Corvette Z06 GT3.R	24	(Denmark) Mikkel Gaarde Pedersen	G	3
(United Kingdom) Steller Motorsport	Chevrolet Corvette Z06 GT3.R	24	(Germany) Lenny Ried	G	3
(United Kingdom) Steller Motorsport	Chevrolet Corvette Z06 GT3.R	24	(Denmark) Kasper H. Jensen	G	5
(France) Saintéloc Racing	Audi R8 LMS Evo II	25	(France) Étienne Cheli	S	All
(France) Saintéloc Racing	Audi R8 LMS Evo II	25	(Argentina) Ezequiel Pérez Companc	S	All
(France) Saintéloc Racing	Audi R8 LMS Evo II	25	(Ukraine) Ivan Klymenko	S	1–3, 5
(France) Saintéloc Racing	Audi R8 LMS Evo II	25	(Switzerland) Lucas Légeret	S	3
(France) Saintéloc Racing	Audi R8 LMS Evo II	25	(Belgium) Lorens Lecertua	S	4
(Belgium) HAAS RT	Audi R8 LMS Evo II	28	(Belgium) Simon Balcaen	PA	3
(Belgium) HAAS RT	Audi R8 LMS Evo II	28	(Belgium) Mathieu Castelein	PA	3
(Belgium) HAAS RT	Audi R8 LMS Evo II	28	(Belgium) Pierre Castelein	PA	3
(Belgium) HAAS RT	Audi R8 LMS Evo II	28	(France) Steven Palette	PA	3
(Belgium) Team WRT	BMW M4 GT3 Evo	30	(Belgium) Amaury Cordeel	S	All
(Belgium) Team WRT	BMW M4 GT3 Evo	30	(Belgium) Matisse Lismont	S	All
(Belgium) Team WRT	BMW M4 GT3 Evo	30	(Argentina) Ignacio Montenegro	S	All
(Belgium) Team WRT	BMW M4 GT3 Evo	30	(Belgium) Mathieu Detry	S	3
(Belgium) Team WRT	BMW M4 GT3 Evo	32	(South Africa) Jordan Pepper	P	All
(Belgium) Team WRT	BMW M4 GT3 Evo	32	(South Africa) Kelvin van der Linde	P	All
(Belgium) Team WRT	BMW M4 GT3 Evo	32	(Belgium) Charles Weerts	P	All
(Belgium) Team WRT	BMW M4 GT3 Evo	46	(Germany) Max Hesse	P	All
(Belgium) Team WRT	BMW M4 GT3 Evo	46	(Italy) Valentino Rossi	P	All
(Belgium) Team WRT	BMW M4 GT3 Evo	46	(United Kingdom) Dan Harper	P	1–4
(Belgium) Team WRT	BMW M4 GT3 Evo	46	(United States) Neil Verhagen	P	5
(Germany) natural elements by Walkenhorst Motorsport	Aston Martin Vantage AMR GT3 Evo	34	(Portugal) Henrique Chaves	P	All
(Germany) natural elements by Walkenhorst Motorsport	Aston Martin Vantage AMR GT3 Evo	34	(United Arab Emirates) Jamie Day	P	All
(Germany) natural elements by Walkenhorst Motorsport	Aston Martin Vantage AMR GT3 Evo	34	(Norway) Christian Krognes	P	All
(Germany) Walkenhorst Motorsport	Aston Martin Vantage AMR GT3 Evo	35	(Ecuador) Mateo Villagómez	S	All
(Germany) Walkenhorst Motorsport	Aston Martin Vantage AMR GT3 Evo	35	(Switzerland) Ethan Ischer	S	1–4
(Germany) Walkenhorst Motorsport	Aston Martin Vantage AMR GT3 Evo	35	(France) Gaspard Simon	S	1–4
(Germany) Walkenhorst Motorsport	Aston Martin Vantage AMR GT3 Evo	35	(France) Maxime Robin	S	3
(Germany) Walkenhorst Motorsport	Aston Martin Vantage AMR GT3 Evo	35	(Slovenia) Mark Kastelic	S	5
(Germany) Walkenhorst Motorsport	Aston Martin Vantage AMR GT3 Evo	35	(Switzerland) Lucas Légeret	S	5
(Austria) Razoon – more than racing	Porsche 911 GT3 R (992.2)	41	(Brazil) Marcos Gomes	B	5
(Austria) Razoon – more than racing	Porsche 911 GT3 R (992.2)	41	(Brazil) Alan Hellmeister	B	5
(Austria) Razoon – more than racing	Porsche 911 GT3 R (992.2)	41	(Brazil) Sebá Malucelli	B	5
(Austria) Razoon – more than racing	Porsche 911 GT3 R (992.2)	914	(Austria) Dominik Olbert	B	1
(Austria) Razoon – more than racing	Porsche 911 GT3 R (992.2)	914	(Belgium) Benjamin Paque	B	1
(Austria) Razoon – more than racing	Porsche 911 GT3 R (992.2)	914	(Austria) Gerhard Tweraser	B	1
(Austria) Razoon – more than racing	Porsche 911 GT3 R (992.2)	914	(Greece) Georgios Kolovos	B	2
(Austria) Razoon – more than racing	Porsche 911 GT3 R (992.2)	914	(Greece) Stylianos Kolovos	B	2
(Austria) Razoon – more than racing	Porsche 911 GT3 R (992.2)	914	(Germany) Lenny Ried	B	2
(Austria) Razoon – more than racing	Porsche 911 GT3 R (992.2)	914	(Italy) Max Mutschlechner	B	5
(Austria) Razoon – more than racing	Porsche 911 GT3 R (992.2)	914	(Austria) Leo Pichler	B	5
(Austria) Razoon – more than racing	Porsche 911 GT3 R (992.2)	914	(Austria) "Richard Wolf"	B	5
(Austria) Razoon – more than racing	Porsche 911 GT3 R (992.2)	914	(United Kingdom) Kenzie Beecroft	PA	3
(Austria) Razoon – more than racing	Porsche 911 GT3 R (992.2)	914	(Thailand) Carl Bennett	PA	3
(Austria) Razoon – more than racing	Porsche 911 GT3 R (992.2)	914	(Australia) Bryce Fullwood	PA	3
(Austria) Razoon – more than racing	Porsche 911 GT3 R (992.2)	914	(United Kingdom) Ed McDermott	PA	3
Oman Racing by Century Motorsport	BMW M4 GT3 Evo	42	(Oman) Ahmad Al Harthy	B	All
Oman Racing by Century Motorsport	BMW M4 GT3 Evo	42	(Spain) Javier Sagrera	B	All
Oman Racing by Century Motorsport	BMW M4 GT3 Evo	42	(Australia) Calan Williams	B	All
Oman Racing by Century Motorsport	BMW M4 GT3 Evo	42	(Brazil) Pedro Ebrahim	B	3
(United Kingdom) Greystone GT	McLaren 720S GT3 Evo	44	(Australia) Jayden Kelly	S	All
(United Kingdom) Greystone GT	McLaren 720S GT3 Evo	44	(Spain) Tommy Pintos	S	All
(United Kingdom) Greystone GT	McLaren 720S GT3 Evo	44	(United Kingdom) Josh Rattican	S	All
(United Kingdom) Greystone GT	McLaren 720S GT3 Evo	44	(United Kingdom) Zac Meakin	S	3
(Germany) Rinaldi Racing	Ferrari 296 GT3 Evo	45	(United States) Dylan Medler	S	All
(Germany) Rinaldi Racing	Ferrari 296 GT3 Evo	45	(South Africa) David Perel	S	All
(Germany) Rinaldi Racing	Ferrari 296 GT3 Evo	45	(Spain) Rafael Durán	S	1–4
(Germany) Rinaldi Racing	Ferrari 296 GT3 Evo	45	(Italy) Alessandro Balzan	S	3
(Germany) Rinaldi Racing	Ferrari 296 GT3 Evo	45	(Zimbabwe) Axcil Jefferies	S	5
(United States) Mercedes-AMG Team Mann-Filter	Mercedes-AMG GT3 Evo	48	(Austria) Lucas Auer	P	All
(United States) Mercedes-AMG Team Mann-Filter	Mercedes-AMG GT3 Evo	48	(Germany) Maro Engel	P	All
(United States) Mercedes-AMG Team Mann-Filter	Mercedes-AMG GT3 Evo	48	(Germany) Luca Stolz	P	All
(United States) Winward Racing	Mercedes-AMG GT3 Evo	87	(Germany) Marvin Dienst	B	All
(United States) Winward Racing	Mercedes-AMG GT3 Evo	87	(Italy) Gabriele Piana	B	All
(United States) Winward Racing	Mercedes-AMG GT3 Evo	87	(Russia) Rinat Salikhov	B	All
(United States) Winward Racing	Mercedes-AMG GT3 Evo	87	(Netherlands) "Daan Arrow"	B	3
(Italy) AF Corse	Ferrari 296 GT3 Evo	50	(Monaco) Arthur Leclerc	P	All
(Italy) AF Corse	Ferrari 296 GT3 Evo	50	(France) Lilou Wadoux	P	All
(Italy) AF Corse	Ferrari 296 GT3 Evo	50	(Indonesia) Sean Gelael	P	1–4
(Italy) AF Corse	Ferrari 296 GT3 Evo	50	(Spain) Albert Costa	P	5
(Italy) AF Corse	Ferrari 296 GT3 Evo	51	(Italy) Tommaso Mosca	P	All
(Italy) AF Corse	Ferrari 296 GT3 Evo	51	(Denmark) Nicklas Nielsen	P	1–4
(Italy) AF Corse	Ferrari 296 GT3 Evo	51	(Italy) Alessio Rovera	P	1–4
(Italy) AF Corse	Ferrari 296 GT3 Evo	51	(Italy) Lorenzo Ferrari	P	5
(Italy) AF Corse	Ferrari 296 GT3 Evo	51	(Italy) Nicola Lacorte	P	5
(Italy) AF Corse	Ferrari 296 GT3 Evo	52	(Belgium) Jef Machiels	S	All
(Italy) AF Corse	Ferrari 296 GT3 Evo	52	(Belgium) Gilles Stadsbader	S	All
(Italy) AF Corse	Ferrari 296 GT3 Evo	52	(Peru) Matías Zagazeta	S	All
(Italy) AF Corse	Ferrari 296 GT3 Evo	52	(Italy) Francesco Braschi	S	3
(Italy) AF Corse	Ferrari 296 GT3 Evo	70	(Republic of Ireland) Peter Dempsey	PA	3
(Italy) AF Corse	Ferrari 296 GT3 Evo	70	(Spain) Miguel Molina	PA	3
(Italy) AF Corse	Ferrari 296 GT3 Evo	70	(Brazil) Custodio Toledo	PA	3
(Italy) AF Corse	Ferrari 296 GT3 Evo	70	(France) Matthieu Vaxivière	PA	3
(Denmark) Selected Car Racing	Ferrari 296 GT3 Evo	71	(Denmark) Simon Birch	G	All
(Denmark) Selected Car Racing	Ferrari 296 GT3 Evo	71	(Denmark) Malte Ebdrup	G	All
(Denmark) Selected Car Racing	Ferrari 296 GT3 Evo	71	(Denmark) Frederik Schandorff	G	All
(Denmark) Selected Car Racing	Ferrari 296 GT3 Evo	71	(Denmark) Conrad Laursen	G	3
(Italy) Dinamic GT	Porsche 911 GT3 R (992.2)	54	(Thailand) Tanart Sathienthirakul	S	All
(Italy) Dinamic GT	Porsche 911 GT3 R (992.2)	54	(Italy) Francesco Simonazzi	S	All
(Italy) Dinamic GT	Porsche 911 GT3 R (992.2)	54	(United Kingdom) Angus Whiteside	S	All
(Italy) Dinamic GT	Porsche 911 GT3 R (992.2)	54	(France) Loris Cabirou	S	3
(United Kingdom) Ecurie Ecosse Blackthorn	Aston Martin Vantage AMR GT3 Evo	56	(United Kingdom) Jonny Adam	B	1–3
(United Kingdom) Ecurie Ecosse Blackthorn	Aston Martin Vantage AMR GT3 Evo	56	(Italy) Giacomo Petrobelli	B	1–3
(United Kingdom) Ecurie Ecosse Blackthorn	Aston Martin Vantage AMR GT3 Evo	56	(United Kingdom) Tom Wood	B	1
(United Kingdom) Ecurie Ecosse Blackthorn	Aston Martin Vantage AMR GT3 Evo	56	(United Kingdom) Lorcan Hanafin	B	2–3
(United Kingdom) Ecurie Ecosse Blackthorn	Aston Martin Vantage AMR GT3 Evo	56	(France) Romain Leroux	B	3
(United Kingdom) Garage 59	McLaren 720S GT3 Evo	58	(United Kingdom) Tom Fleming	G	All
(United Kingdom) Garage 59	McLaren 720S GT3 Evo	58	(Germany) Benjamin Goethe	G	All
(United Kingdom) Garage 59	McLaren 720S GT3 Evo	58	(Monaco) Louis Prette	G	All
(United Kingdom) Garage 59	McLaren 720S GT3 Evo	59	(United Kingdom) Joseph Loake	P	All
(United Kingdom) Garage 59	McLaren 720S GT3 Evo	59	(United Kingdom) Dean MacDonald	P	All
(United Kingdom) Garage 59	McLaren 720S GT3 Evo	59	(Germany) Marvin Kirchhöfer	P	1–4
(United Kingdom) Garage 59	McLaren 720S GT3 Evo	59	(United Kingdom) Jack Hawksworth	P	5
(United Kingdom) JMW Motorsport	Ferrari 296 GT3 Evo	60	(Germany) Tim Heinemann	B	1–3
(United Kingdom) JMW Motorsport	Ferrari 296 GT3 Evo	60	(Switzerland) Rolf Ineichen	B	1–3
(United Kingdom) JMW Motorsport	Ferrari 296 GT3 Evo	60	(United States) Chandler Hull	B	1
(United Kingdom) JMW Motorsport	Ferrari 296 GT3 Evo	60	(Germany) Thomas Kiefer	B	2–3
(United Kingdom) JMW Motorsport	Ferrari 296 GT3 Evo	60	(France) Pierre-Louis Chovet	B	3
(United Kingdom) JMW Motorsport	Ferrari 296 GT3 Evo	60	(Germany) Tim Heinemann	P	4
(United Kingdom) JMW Motorsport	Ferrari 296 GT3 Evo	60	(Finland) Konsta Lappalainen	P	4
(United Kingdom) JMW Motorsport	Ferrari 296 GT3 Evo	60	(Netherlands) Thierry Vermeulen	P	4
(United Kingdom) JMW Motorsport	Ferrari 296 GT3 Evo	60	(Italy) Giacomo Altoè	G	5
(United Kingdom) JMW Motorsport	Ferrari 296 GT3 Evo	60	(Finland) Konsta Lappalainen	G	5
(United Kingdom) JMW Motorsport	Ferrari 296 GT3 Evo	60	(United Kingdom) Casper Stevenson	G	5
(Austria) TGI Team by GRT	Lamborghini Temerario GT3	63	(Italy) Mirko Bortolotti	P	All
(Austria) TGI Team by GRT	Lamborghini Temerario GT3	63	(France) Franck Perera	P	All
(Austria) TGI Team by GRT	Lamborghini Temerario GT3	63	(Germany) Maximilian Paul	P	1–3, 5
(Austria) TGI Team by GRT	Lamborghini Temerario GT3	63	(United Kingdom) Sandy Mitchell	P	4
(Germany) HRT Ford Racing (Note: Cars No. 64 and No. 65 entered as HRT Ford Racing. Car No. 177 entered as Grupo Prom Racing Team.) (Belgium) Grupo Prom Racing Team	Ford Mustang GT3 Evo	64	(France) Thomas Drouet	P	All
(Germany) HRT Ford Racing (Belgium) Grupo Prom Racing Team	Ford Mustang GT3 Evo	64	(India) Arjun Maini	P	All
(Germany) HRT Ford Racing (Belgium) Grupo Prom Racing Team	Ford Mustang GT3 Evo	64	(Switzerland) Fabio Scherer	P	All
(Germany) HRT Ford Racing (Belgium) Grupo Prom Racing Team	Ford Mustang GT3 Evo	65	(Philippines) Eduardo Coseteng	S	All
(Germany) HRT Ford Racing (Belgium) Grupo Prom Racing Team	Ford Mustang GT3 Evo	65	(Netherlands) Maxime Oosten	S	1–3, 5
(Germany) HRT Ford Racing (Belgium) Grupo Prom Racing Team	Ford Mustang GT3 Evo	65	(Germany) Finn Wiebelhaus	S	1–3
(Germany) HRT Ford Racing (Belgium) Grupo Prom Racing Team	Ford Mustang GT3 Evo	65	(Germany) Max Reis	S	3
(Germany) HRT Ford Racing (Belgium) Grupo Prom Racing Team	Ford Mustang GT3 Evo	65	(Belgium) Nicolas Baert	S	4–5
(Germany) HRT Ford Racing (Belgium) Grupo Prom Racing Team	Ford Mustang GT3 Evo	65	(Germany) Niklas Kalus	S	4
(Germany) HRT Ford Racing (Belgium) Grupo Prom Racing Team	Mercedes-AMG GT3 Evo	177	(Netherlands) Colin Caresani	B	1–2, 4
(Germany) HRT Ford Racing (Belgium) Grupo Prom Racing Team	Mercedes-AMG GT3 Evo	177	(Mexico) Alfredo Hernández	B	1–2, 4
(Germany) HRT Ford Racing (Belgium) Grupo Prom Racing Team	Mercedes-AMG GT3 Evo	177	(France) Stéphane Tribaudini	B	1–2, 4
(Germany) HRT Ford Racing (Belgium) Grupo Prom Racing Team	Mercedes-AMG GT3 Evo	177	(Netherlands) Colin Caresani	PA	3
(Germany) HRT Ford Racing (Belgium) Grupo Prom Racing Team	Mercedes-AMG GT3 Evo	177	(United Kingdom) Adam Christodoulou	PA	3
(Germany) HRT Ford Racing (Belgium) Grupo Prom Racing Team	Mercedes-AMG GT3 Evo	177	(Mexico) Alfredo Hernández	PA	3
(Germany) HRT Ford Racing (Belgium) Grupo Prom Racing Team	Mercedes-AMG GT3 Evo	177	(France) Stéphane Tribaudini	PA	3
(Germany) Tresor Attempto Racing	Audi R8 LMS Evo II	66	(Israel) Ariel Levi	S	All
(Germany) Tresor Attempto Racing	Audi R8 LMS Evo II	66	(Italy) Rocco Mazzola	S	All
(Germany) Tresor Attempto Racing	Audi R8 LMS Evo II	66	(Denmark) Sebastian Øgaard	S	All
(Germany) Tresor Attempto Racing	Audi R8 LMS Evo II	66	(Slovenia) Mark Kastelic	S	3
(Germany) Tresor Attempto Racing	Audi R8 LMS Evo II	88	(Italy) Daniele Di Amato	B	All
(Germany) Tresor Attempto Racing	Audi R8 LMS Evo II	88	(Germany) Carrie Schreiner	B	All
(Germany) Tresor Attempto Racing	Audi R8 LMS Evo II	88	(Italy) Alberto Di Folco	B	1
(Germany) Tresor Attempto Racing	Audi R8 LMS Evo II	88	(Austria) Gerhard Tweraser	B	2, 4
(Germany) Tresor Attempto Racing	Audi R8 LMS Evo II	88	(Greece) Georgios Kolovos	B	3
(Germany) Tresor Attempto Racing	Audi R8 LMS Evo II	88	(Brazil) Sérgio Sette Câmara	B	3
(Germany) Tresor Attempto Racing	Audi R8 LMS Evo II	88	(Slovenia) Alexey Nesov	B	5
(Germany) Tresor Attempto Racing	Audi R8 LMS Evo II	99	(Italy) Andrea Frassineti	G	All
(Germany) Tresor Attempto Racing	Audi R8 LMS Evo II	99	(Luxembourg) Dylan Pereira	G	All
(Germany) Tresor Attempto Racing	Audi R8 LMS Evo II	99	(Germany) Alex Aka	G	1, 3–5
(Germany) Tresor Attempto Racing	Audi R8 LMS Evo II	99	(Italy) Lorenzo Ferrari	G	2
(Switzerland) Kessel Racing	Ferrari 296 GT3 Evo	74	(Germany) Dennis Marschall	B	All
(Switzerland) Kessel Racing	Ferrari 296 GT3 Evo	74	(United States) Dustin Blattner	B	1–3, 5
(Switzerland) Kessel Racing	Ferrari 296 GT3 Evo	74	(Italy) Lorenzo Patrese	B	1–2, 4–5
(Switzerland) Kessel Racing	Ferrari 296 GT3 Evo	74	(France) Mathys Jaubert	B	3
(Switzerland) Kessel Racing	Ferrari 296 GT3 Evo	74	(United Kingdom) Ben Tuck	B	3
(Switzerland) Kessel Racing	Ferrari 296 GT3 Evo	74	(Germany) Constantin Dressler	B	4
(Netherlands) KPX Motorsport	BMW M4 GT3 Evo	77	(Netherlands) Yelmer Buurman	B	5
(Netherlands) KPX Motorsport	BMW M4 GT3 Evo	77	(Netherlands) Jop Rappange	B	5
(Netherlands) KPX Motorsport	BMW M4 GT3 Evo	77	(Netherlands) Nigel Schoonderwoerd	B	5
(San Marino) Tsunami RT	Porsche 911 GT3 R (992.2)	79	(Italy) Fabio Babini	PA	3
(San Marino) Tsunami RT	Porsche 911 GT3 R (992.2)	79	(Japan) Hiroshi Hamaguchi	PA	3
(San Marino) Tsunami RT	Porsche 911 GT3 R (992.2)	79	(Germany) Nico Menzel	PA	3
(San Marino) Tsunami RT	Porsche 911 GT3 R (992.2)	79	(Italy) Johannes Zelger	PA	3
(Germany) Lionspeed GP	Porsche 911 GT3 R (992.2)	80	(Denmark) Bastian Buus	P	All
(Germany) Lionspeed GP	Porsche 911 GT3 R (992.2)	80	(Switzerland) Ricardo Feller	P	All
(Germany) Lionspeed GP	Porsche 911 GT3 R (992.2)	80	(Austria) Thomas Preining	P	All
(Germany) Lionspeed GP	Porsche 911 GT3 R (992.2)	89	(Switzerland) Alex Fontana	B	All
(Germany) Lionspeed GP	Porsche 911 GT3 R (992.2)	89	(Germany) Patrick Kolb	B	All
(Germany) Lionspeed GP	Porsche 911 GT3 R (992.2)	89	(Canada) Bashar Mardini	B	All
(Germany) Lionspeed GP	Porsche 911 GT3 R (992.2)	89	(Zimbabwe) Axcil Jefferies	B	3
(Austria) Eastalent Racing	Audi R8 LMS Evo II	84	(Germany) Christopher Haase	P	All
(Austria) Eastalent Racing	Audi R8 LMS Evo II	84	(Austria) Simon Reicher	P	All
(Austria) Eastalent Racing	Audi R8 LMS Evo II	84	(Germany) Markus Winkelhock	P	All
(Denmark) High Class Racing	Porsche 911 GT3 R (992.2)	86	(Denmark) Anders Fjordbach	PA	3
(Denmark) High Class Racing	Porsche 911 GT3 R (992.2)	86	(China) Kerong Li	PA	3
(Denmark) High Class Racing	Porsche 911 GT3 R (992.2)	86	(China) Leo Ye Hongli	PA	3
(Denmark) High Class Racing	Porsche 911 GT3 R (992.2)	86	(China) Bo Yuan	PA	3
(Denmark) High Class Racing	Porsche 911 GT3 R (992.2)	269	(Austria) Klaus Bachler	B	5
(Denmark) High Class Racing	Porsche 911 GT3 R (992.2)	269	(Germany) Max Moritz	B	5
(Denmark) High Class Racing	Porsche 911 GT3 R (992.2)	269	(Austria) Raphael Rennhofer	B	5
(Germany) Herberth Motorsport	Porsche 911 GT3 R (992.2)	91	(Germany) Ralf Bohn	B	All
(Germany) Herberth Motorsport	Porsche 911 GT3 R (992.2)	91	(Netherlands) Huub van Eijndhoven	B	All
(Germany) Herberth Motorsport	Porsche 911 GT3 R (992.2)	91	(Germany) Robert Renauer	B	1–2, 4–5
(Germany) Herberth Motorsport	Porsche 911 GT3 R (992.2)	91	(France) Mathieu Jaminet	B	3
(Germany) Herberth Motorsport	Porsche 911 GT3 R (992.2)	91	(Germany) Alfred Renauer	B	3
(United Kingdom) Ziggo Sport – Tempesta Racing	Porsche 911 GT3 R (992.2)	93	(Italy) Eddie Cheever III	B	All
(United Kingdom) Ziggo Sport – Tempesta Racing	Porsche 911 GT3 R (992.2)	93	(United Kingdom) Chris Froggatt	B	All
(United Kingdom) Ziggo Sport – Tempesta Racing	Porsche 911 GT3 R (992.2)	93	(Italy) Stefano Costantini	B	1
(United Kingdom) Ziggo Sport – Tempesta Racing	Porsche 911 GT3 R (992.2)	93	(Hong Kong) Jonathan Hui	B	2–3
(United Kingdom) Ziggo Sport – Tempesta Racing	Porsche 911 GT3 R (992.2)	93	(Netherlands) Mex Jansen	B	3
(United Kingdom) Ziggo Sport – Tempesta Racing	Porsche 911 GT3 R (992.2)	93	(Republic of Ireland) Peter Dempsey	B	4
(United Kingdom) Ziggo Sport – Tempesta Racing	Porsche 911 GT3 R (992.2)	93	(Germany) Lucas Wolf	B	5
(Germany) Rutronik Racing	Lamborghini Temerario GT3	96	(Germany) Luca Engstler	P	All
(Germany) Rutronik Racing	Lamborghini Temerario GT3	96	(Italy) Marco Mapelli	P	All
(Germany) Rutronik Racing	Lamborghini Temerario GT3	96	(Switzerland) Patric Niederhauser	P	All
(Germany) Rutronik Racing	Porsche 911 GT3 R (992.2)	97	(Hong Kong) Antares Au	B	1–4
(Germany) Rutronik Racing	Porsche 911 GT3 R (992.2)	97	(Italy) Riccardo Pera	B	1–2, 4
(Germany) Rutronik Racing	Porsche 911 GT3 R (992.2)	97	(Netherlands) Loek Hartog	B	1
(Germany) Rutronik Racing	Porsche 911 GT3 R (992.2)	97	(Germany) Sven Müller	B	2–4
(Germany) Rutronik Racing	Porsche 911 GT3 R (992.2)	97	(Denmark) Michelle Gatting	B	3
(Germany) Rutronik Racing	Porsche 911 GT3 R (992.2)	97	(Estonia) Martin Rump	B	3
(Germany) ROWE Racing	BMW M4 GT3 Evo	98	(United Kingdom) Jake Dennis	P	All
(Germany) ROWE Racing	BMW M4 GT3 Evo	98	(Brazil) Augusto Farfus	P	1–4
(Germany) ROWE Racing	BMW M4 GT3 Evo	98	(Switzerland) Raffaele Marciello	P	1–4
(Germany) ROWE Racing	BMW M4 GT3 Evo	98	(Austria) Philipp Eng	P	5
(Germany) ROWE Racing	BMW M4 GT3 Evo	98	(Germany) Marco Wittmann	P	5
(Germany) ROWE Racing	BMW M4 GT3 Evo	998	(Belgium) Ugo de Wilde	G	All
(Germany) ROWE Racing	BMW M4 GT3 Evo	998	(Germany) Jens Klingmann	G	All
(Germany) ROWE Racing	BMW M4 GT3 Evo	998	(Germany) Tim Tramnitz	G	All
(France) CSA Racing	McLaren 720S GT3 Evo	111	(France) Simon Gachet	G	All
(France) CSA Racing	McLaren 720S GT3 Evo	111	(United Kingdom) James Kell	G	All
(France) CSA Racing	McLaren 720S GT3 Evo	111	(France) Arthur Rougier	G	1–4
(France) CSA Racing	McLaren 720S GT3 Evo	111	(France) Jim Pla	G	3, 5
(France) CSA Racing	McLaren 720S GT3 Evo	555	(France) Romain Andriolo	S	1–4
(France) CSA Racing	McLaren 720S GT3 Evo	555	(Belgium) Baptiste Moulin	S	1–3
(France) CSA Racing	McLaren 720S GT3 Evo	555	(Belgium) Lorens Lecertua	S	1–3
(France) CSA Racing	McLaren 720S GT3 Evo	555	(India) Sai Sanjay	S	3
(France) CSA Racing	McLaren 720S GT3 Evo	555	(United Kingdom) James Higgins	S	4–5
(France) CSA Racing	McLaren 720S GT3 Evo	555	(France) Jean-Baptiste Simmenauer	S	4–5
(France) CSA Racing	McLaren 720S GT3 Evo	555	(France) Loris Cabirou	S	5
(Belgium) Mühlner Motorsport	Porsche 911 GT3 R (992.2)	123	(Belgium) Armand Fumal	B	3
(Belgium) Mühlner Motorsport	Porsche 911 GT3 R (992.2)	123	(Australia) Bayley Hall	B	3
(Belgium) Mühlner Motorsport	Porsche 911 GT3 R (992.2)	123	(Australia) Andres Latorre Canon	B	3
(Belgium) Mühlner Motorsport	Porsche 911 GT3 R (992.2)	123	(Germany) Tobias Müller	B	3
(United Kingdom) Paradine Competition	BMW M4 GT3 Evo	991	(United Kingdom) James Kellett	B	All
(United Kingdom) Paradine Competition	BMW M4 GT3 Evo	991	(United Kingdom) Darren Leung	B	All
(United Kingdom) Paradine Competition	BMW M4 GT3 Evo	991	(Belgium) Dries Vanthoor	B	1, 4
(United Kingdom) Paradine Competition	BMW M4 GT3 Evo	991	(Netherlands) Robert de Haan	B	2, 5
(United Kingdom) Paradine Competition	BMW M4 GT3 Evo	991	(South Africa) Leyton Fourie	B	3
(United Kingdom) Paradine Competition	BMW M4 GT3 Evo	991	(United Kingdom) David Pittard	B	3
(United Kingdom) Paradine Competition	BMW M4 GT3 Evo	992	(Netherlands) Robert de Haan	G	1
(United Kingdom) Paradine Competition	BMW M4 GT3 Evo	992	(Brazil) Christian Hahn	G	1
(United Kingdom) Paradine Competition	BMW M4 GT3 Evo	992	(United Kingdom) Ashley Sutton	G	1
(United Kingdom) Paradine Competition	BMW M4 GT3 Evo	992	(Brazil) Christian Hahn	S	2–5
(United Kingdom) Paradine Competition	BMW M4 GT3 Evo	992	(United Kingdom) Josh Rowledge	S	2–5
(United Kingdom) Paradine Competition	BMW M4 GT3 Evo	992	(United Kingdom) Bobby Thompson	S	2, 4
(United Kingdom) Paradine Competition	BMW M4 GT3 Evo	992	(Mexico) Ian Aguilera	S	3
(United Kingdom) Paradine Competition	BMW M4 GT3 Evo	992	(Netherlands) Jop Rappange	S	3
(United Kingdom) Paradine Competition	BMW M4 GT3 Evo	992	(Philippines) Daryl De Leon	S	5

Icon	Class
P	Pro Cup
G	Gold Cup
S	Silver Cup
B	Bronze Cup
PA	Pro-Am Cup

- 75 Express entered the No. 75 Mercedes-AMG GT3 Evo in Bronze Cup for Dominik Baumann, Hadrien David and team owner Kenny Habul, but did not appear at any rounds. Additionally, Kessel Racing was scheduled to field a second Ferrari 296 GT3 Evo, No. 76, in Bronze Cup for Alessandro Cutrera, Marco Frezza and David Fumanelli.
- Didier André and Grégory Guilvert were scheduled to share Saintéloc Racing's lone Audi, but the team reshuffled its lineup prior to the start of the season. Saintéloc also held talks with Lamborghini about a possible Temerario GT3 programme.
- Denny Berndt, Leo Pichler and Luca Rettenbacher were scheduled to share Razoon's lone Porsche, but the team reshuffled its lineup and moved from Silver to Bronze Cup prior to the start of the season.
- Will Martin, Hunter Abbott and Daniil Move were scheduled to compete for GetSpeed Team Dubai, JMW Motorsport and Ziggo Sport – Tempesta Racing respectively, but were replaced prior to the start of the season. Ralf Aron signed for Grupo Prom's No. 177 car, but sustained a back injury at the Bathurst 12 Hour and was replaced by Colin Caresani. Aron later joined the No. 17 GetSpeed Mercedes at Portimão.
- Afiq Yazid, Luciano Morano and Daniel Gaunt entered the 24 Hours of Spa for JMR, Team RJN and Tsunami RT respectively, but were replaced before the event. Laurin Heinrich, who had joined Schumacher CLRT for the race, later opted to contest IMSA's 6 Hours of Watkins Glen instead, and was replaced by Frédéric Makowiecki. Kenzie Beecroft switched cars from the No. 8 Car Collection to the No. 914 Razoon entry, with the former drafting in Reinhold Krahn instead. Vanina Ickx and Paul Meijer, who were listed in the No. 123 Mühlner Porsche, stepped down after the Prologue.
- Era Motorsport was a late withdrawal from the 24 Hours of Spa. Jake Hill and team owner Kyle Tilley had been confirmed in the No. 81 Porsche 911 GT3 R (992.2) in Bronze Cup.

== Race results ==
Round	Circuit	Pole Position	Overall Winners	Gold Winners	Silver Winners	Bronze Winners	Pro/Am Winners	Report
1	(France) Paul Ricard	(United States) No. 48 Mercedes-AMG Team Mann-Filter	(Belgium) No. 7 Comtoyou Racing	(United Kingdom) No. 58 Garage 59	(Lithuania) No. 9 Pure Rxcing	(Germany) No. 97 Rutronik Racing	No Entries	Report
1	(France) Paul Ricard	(Austria) Lucas Auer (Germany) Maro Engel (Germany) Luca Stolz	(Italy) Mattia Drudi (Denmark) Marco Sørensen (Denmark) Nicki Thiim	(United Kingdom) Tom Fleming (Germany) Benjamin Goethe (Monaco) Louis Prette	(Austria) Max Hofer (United Kingdom) Alex Malykhin (Slovenia) Alexey Nesov	(Hong Kong) Antares Au (Netherlands) Loek Hartog (Italy) Riccardo Pera	No Entries	Report
2	(Italy) Monza	(Germany) No. 64 HRT Ford Racing	(Germany) No. 66 Tresor Attempto Racing	(Denmark) No. 71 Selected Car Racing	(Germany) No. 66 Tresor Attempto Racing	(Switzerland) No. 74 Kessel Racing	No Entries	Report
2	(Italy) Monza	(France) Thomas Drouet (India) Arjun Maini (Switzerland) Fabio Scherer	(Israel) Ariel Levi (Italy) Rocco Mazzola (Denmark) Sebastian Øgaard	(Denmark) Simon Birch (Denmark) Malte Ebdrup (Denmark) Frederik Schandorff	(Israel) Ariel Levi (Italy) Rocco Mazzola (Denmark) Sebastian Øgaard	(United States) Dustin Blattner (Germany) Dennis Marschall (Italy) Lorenzo Patrese	No Entries	Report
3	(Belgium) Spa-Francorchamps	(Italy) No. 51 AF Corse	(Germany) No. 80 Lionspeed GP	(Germany) No. 998 ROWE Racing	(Germany) No. 45 Rinaldi Racing	(Switzerland) No. 74 Kessel Racing	(Malaysia) No. 0 Johor Motorsports Racing JMR	Report
3	(Belgium) Spa-Francorchamps	(Italy) Tommaso Mosca (Denmark) Nicklas Nielsen (Italy) Alessio Rovera	(Denmark) Bastian Buus (Switzerland) Ricardo Feller (Austria) Thomas Preining	(Belgium) Ugo de Wilde (Germany) Jens Klingmann (Germany) Tim Tramnitz	(Italy) Alessandro Balzan (Spain) Rafael Durán (United States) Dylan Medler (South Africa) David Perel	(United States) Dustin Blattner (France) Mathys Jaubert (Germany) Dennis Marschall (United Kingdom) Ben Tuck	(United Kingdom) Ben Green (Malaysia) Prince Abu Bakar Ibrahim (Malaysia) Prince Jefri Ibrahim (Australia) Jordan Love	Report
4	(Germany) Nürburgring	(Belgium) No. 7 Comtoyou Racing	(Belgium) No. 7 Comtoyou Racing	(Germany) No. 99 Tresor Attempto Racing	(Germany) No. 65 HRT Ford Racing	(Bahrain) No. 222 2 Seas Motorsport	No Entries	Report
4	(Germany) Nürburgring	(Italy) Mattia Drudi (Denmark) Marco Sørensen (Denmark) Nicki Thiim	(Italy) Mattia Drudi (Denmark) Marco Sørensen (Denmark) Nicki Thiim	(Germany) Alex Aka (Italy) Andrea Frassineti (Luxembourg) Dylan Pereira	(Belgium) Nicolas Baert (Philippines) Eduardo Coseteng (Germany) Niklas Kalus	(Republic of Ireland) Reece Barr (United Kingdom) Charles Dawson (United Kingdom) Kiern Jewiss	No Entries	Report
5	(Portugal) Portimão	(Belgium) No. 2 Boutsen VDS	(Germany) No. 17 Mercedes-AMG Team GetSpeed	(Denmark) No. 71 Selected Car Racing	(Belgium) No. 30 Team WRT	(Bahrain) No. 222 2 Seas Motorsport	No Entries	Report
5	(Portugal) Portimão	(France) Dorian Boccolacci (Belgium) Alessio Picariello (Netherlands) Morris Schuring	(Estonia) Ralf Aron (Germany) Maximilian Götz (Germany) Fabian Schiller	(Denmark) Simon Birch (Denmark) Malte Ebdrup (Denmark) Frederik Schandorff	(Belgium) Amaury Cordeel (Belgium) Matisse Lismont (Argentina) Ignacio Montenegro	(Republic of Ireland) Reece Barr (United Kingdom) Charles Dawson (United Kingdom) Kiern Jewiss	No Entries	Report

== Championship standings ==
Scoring system

Championship points are awarded for the first ten positions in each race. The pole-sitter also receives one point and entries are required to complete 75% of the winning car's race distance in order to be classified and earn points. Individual drivers are required to participate for a minimum of 25 minutes in order to earn championship points in any race.

Monza, Nürburgring & Portimão points

Position	1st	2nd	3rd	4th	5th	6th	7th	8th	9th	10th	Pole
Points	25	18	15	12	10	8	6	4	2	1	1

Paul Ricard points

Position	1st	2nd	3rd	4th	5th	6th	7th	8th	9th	10th	Pole
Points	33	24	19	15	12	9	6	4	2	1	1

24 Hours of Spa points

Points are awarded after six hours, after twelve hours and at the finish.

Position	1st	2nd	3rd	4th	5th	6th	7th	8th	9th	10th
Points after 6hrs/12hrs	12	9	7	6	5	4	3	2	1	0
Points at the finish	25	18	15	12	10	8	6	4	2	1

Additionally, points are awarded to the top 3 in Super Pole.

Position	1st	2nd	3rd
Points	3	2	1

=== Drivers' Championship ===
==== Overall ====
Pos.	Drivers	Team	LEC (France)	MNZ (Italy)	SPA (Belgium)			NÜR (Germany)	ALG (Portugal)	Points
Pos.	Drivers	Team	LEC (France)	MNZ (Italy)	6hrs	12hrs	24hrs	NÜR (Germany)	ALG (Portugal)	Points
1	(Austria) Lucas Auer (Germany) Maro Engel (Germany) Luca Stolz	(United States) Mercedes-AMG Team Mann-Filter	2^{P}	2	3	4	2	4	14	86
2	(Italy) Mattia Drudi (Denmark) Nicki Thiim	(Belgium) Comtoyou Racing	1^{F}	Ret	11	22	Ret	1^{PF}	Ret	59
2	(Denmark) Marco Sørensen	(Belgium) Comtoyou Racing	1^{F}	Ret	11	22	Ret	1^{PF}		59
3	(Denmark) Bastian Buus (Switzerland) Ricardo Feller (Austria) Thomas Preining	(Germany) Lionspeed GP	Ret	Ret	15	5	1	15	2	48
4	(South Africa) Jordan Pepper (South Africa) Kelvin van der Linde (Belgium) Charles Weerts	(Belgium) Team WRT	4	30	2	24	12	2	29	42
5	(Germany) Maximilian Götz (Germany) Fabian Schiller	(Germany) Mercedes-AMG Team GetSpeed	7	Ret	62†	62†	Ret	5	1	41
6	(France) Dorian Boccolacci (Belgium) Alessio Picariello (Netherlands) Morris Schuring	(Belgium) Boutsen VDS	11	4	7	15	8	12	3^{P}	35
7	(United Kingdom) Tom Fleming (Germany) Benjamin Goethe (Monaco) Louis Prette	(United Kingdom) Garage 59	3	18	4	3	36	Ret	DSQ	32
8	(United Kingdom) Jake Dennis	(Germany) ROWE Racing	6	5	5	21	9	17	21	26
8	(Brazil) Augusto Farfus (Switzerland) Raffaele Marciello	(Germany) ROWE Racing	6	5	5	21	9	17		26
9	(Israel) Ariel Levi (Italy) Rocco Mazzola (Denmark) Sebastian Øgaard	(Germany) Tresor Attempto Racing	21	1	67†	67†	Ret	37	15	25
10	(United Kingdom) Chris Lulham	(Netherlands) Mercedes-AMG Team Verstappen Racing	9	Ret	10	6	Ret	3	9	23
11	(Andorra) Jules Gounon (Spain) Daniel Juncadella	(Netherlands) Mercedes-AMG Team Verstappen Racing	9	Ret	10	6	Ret	3		21
12	(United Kingdom) Joseph Loake (United Kingdom) Dean MacDonald	(United Kingdom) Garage 59	5	Ret	13	61†	Ret	10	6^{F}	21
13	(Germany) Dennis Marschall	(Switzerland) Kessel Racing	28	8^{F}	14	1	10	26	33	17
13	(United States) Dustin Blattner	(Switzerland) Kessel Racing	28	8^{F}	14	1	10		33	17
14	(Italy) Tommaso Mosca	(Italy) AF Corse	14	Ret	35	23	3^{PF}	29	11	16
14	(Denmark) Nicklas Nielsen (Italy) Alessio Rovera	(Italy) AF Corse	14	Ret	35	23	3^{PF}	29		16
15	(Belgium) Maxime Martin	(Germany) Mercedes-AMG Team GetSpeed	7	Ret	62†	62†	Ret	5		16
16	(France) Thomas Drouet (India) Arjun Maini (Switzerland) Fabio Scherer	(Germany) HRT Ford Racing	25	Ret^{P}	6	7	Ret	6	16	16
17	(France) Romain Andriolo	(France) CSA Racing	Ret	3	45	33	40	Ret		15
17	(Belgium) Lorens Lecertua	(France) CSA Racing	Ret	3	45	33	40			15
17	(Belgium) Lorens Lecertua	(France) Saintéloc Racing						Ret		15
17	(Belgium) Baptiste Moulin	(France) CSA Racing	Ret	3	45	33	40			15
18	(Germany) Marvin Kirchhöfer	(United Kingdom) Garage 59	5	Ret	13	61†	Ret	10		13
19	(Germany) Max Hesse (Italy) Valentino Rossi	(Belgium) Team WRT	12	Ret	9	8	6	9	49	13
19	(United Kingdom) Dan Harper	(Belgium) Team WRT	12	Ret	9	8	6	9		13
20	(France) Mathys Jaubert (United Kingdom) Ben Tuck	(Switzerland) Kessel Racing			14	1	10			13
21	(Denmark) Simon Birch (Denmark) Malte Ebdrup (Denmark) Frederik Schandorff	(Denmark) Selected Car Racing	16	14	16	42	26	11	4	12
21	(Australia) Matt Campbell (Turkey) Ayhancan Güven (France) Frederic Makowiecki	(France) Schumacher CLRT			12	17	4			12
22	(Germany) Christopher Haase (Austria) Simon Reicher (Germany) Markus Winkelhock	(Austria) Eastalent Racing	15	20	1	51	Ret	Ret	Ret	12
23	(Monaco) Arthur Leclerc (France) Lilou Wadoux	(Italy) AF Corse	19	11	22	12	5	40	10	11
24	(Indonesia) Sean Gelael	(Italy) AF Corse	19	11	22	12	5	40		10
24	(Belgium) Amaury Cordeel (Belgium) Matisse Lismont (Argentina) Ignacio Montenegro	(Belgium) Team WRT	18	17	24	20	15	14	5	10
25	(Belgium) Ugo de Wilde (Germany) Jens Klingmann (Germany) Tim Tramnitz	(Germany) ROWE Racing	10	23	8	10	11	17	7	9
26	(United Kingdom) James Kellett (United Kingdom) Darren Leung	(United Kingdom) Paradine Competition	23	16	19	2	13	36	31	9
26	(South Africa) Leyton Fourie (United Kingdom) David Pittard	(United Kingdom) Paradine Competition			19	2	13			9
27	(Germany) Ben Dörr (United Kingdom) Horatio Fitz-Simon (United Kingdom) Max Lynn	(United Kingdom) Team RJN	32	6	59	50	35	39	23	8
28	(Portugal) Henrique Chaves (United Arab Emirates) Jamie Day (Norway) Christian Krognes	(Germany) natural elements by Walkenhorst Motorsport	WD	28	32	9	7	16	12	7
29	(Germany) Luca Engstler (Italy) Marco Mapelli (Switzerland) Patric Niederhauser	(Germany) Rutronik Racing	Ret	7	18	18	19	19	50	6
29	(Italy) Andrea Frassineti (Luxembourg) Dylan Pereira	(Germany) Tresor Attempto Racing	Ret	Ret	65†	65†	Ret	7	30	6
29	(Germany) Alex Aka	(Germany) Tresor Attempto Racing	Ret		65†	65†	Ret	7	30	6
30	(United States) Anthony Bartone (France) César Gazeau (France) Aurélien Panis	(United States) GetSpeed Team Bartone Bros	33	13	33	26	28	20	8	4
30	(France) Simon Gachet (United Kingdom) James Kell	(France) CSA Racing	8	33	21	14	34	27	39	4
30	(France) Arthur Rougier	(France) CSA Racing	8	33	21	14	34	27		4
30	(Sweden) Robin Knutsson (Belgium) Gilles Magnus	(Belgium) Boutsen VDS	Ret	Ret	17	16	22	8	Ret	4
30	(Germany) Nico Menzel	(San Marino) Tsunami RT			53	47	38			4
30	(Germany) Nico Menzel	(Belgium) Boutsen VDS						8		4
30	(Italy) Lorenzo Patrese	(Switzerland) Kessel Racing	28	8^{F}				26	33	4
31	(United Kingdom) Jonny Adam (Italy) Giacomo Petrobelli	(United Kingdom) Ecurie Ecosse Blackthorn	41	9	27	41	31			2
31	(United Kingdom) Lorcan Hanafin	(United Kingdom) Ecurie Ecosse Blackthorn		9	27	41	31			2
32	(Thailand) Tanart Sathienthirakul (Italy) Francesco Simonazzi (United Kingdom) Angus Whiteside	(Italy) Dinamic GT	37	10	48	35	25	43	Ret	1
—	(Portugal) Guilherme Oliveira (United Kingdom) Mikey Porter (Netherlands) Dante Rappange	(United Kingdom) Optimum Motorsport	Ret	Ret	30	11	17	Ret	27	0
—	(Germany) Salman Owega	(United Kingdom) Optimum Motorsport			30	11	17			0
—	(Italy) Lorenzo Ferrari	(Germany) Tresor Attempto Racing		Ret						0
—	(Italy) Lorenzo Ferrari	(Italy) AF Corse							11	0
—	(Oman) Ahmad Al Harthy (Spain) Javier Sagrera (Australia) Calan Williams	Oman Racing by Century Motorsport	29	12	55	48	Ret	33	26	0
—	(Belgium) Jef Machiels (Belgium) Gilles Stadsbader (Peru) Matías Zagazeta	(Italy) AF Corse	31	Ret	26	13	16	32	28	0
—	(Italy) Francesco Braschi	(Italy) AF Corse			26	13	16			0
—	(Philippines) Eduardo Coseteng	(Germany) HRT Ford Racing	26	Ret	37	19	18	13	20	0
—	(Belgium) Nicolas Baert	(Belgium) Comtoyou Racing			43	43	Ret			0
—	(Belgium) Nicolas Baert	(Germany) HRT Ford Racing						13	20	0
—	(Republic of Ireland) Reece Barr (United Kingdom) Charles Dawson (United Kingdom) Kiern Jewiss	(Bahrain) 2 Seas Motorsport	27	41†	38	30	27	23	13	0
—	(Hong Kong) Antares Au	(Germany) Rutronik Racing	13	38†	29	25	43	Ret		0
—	(Italy) Riccardo Pera	(Germany) Rutronik Racing	13	38†				Ret		0
—	(Netherlands) Loek Hartog	(Germany) Rutronik Racing	13							0
—	(Germany) Niklas Kalus	(Germany) HRT Ford Racing						13		0
—	(United States) Dylan Medler (South Africa) David Perel	(Germany) Rinaldi Racing	42	19	42	29	14	Ret	41	0
—	(Spain) Rafael Durán	(Germany) Rinaldi Racing	42	19	42	29	14	Ret		0
—	(France) Jim Pla	(France) CSA Racing			21	14	34		39	0
—	(Italy) Alessandro Balzan	(Germany) Rinaldi Racing			42	29	14			0
—	(Belgium) Mathieu Detry	(Belgium) Team WRT			24	20	15			0
—	(Italy) Eddie Cheever III (United Kingdom) Chris Froggatt	(United Kingdom) Ziggo Sport – Tempesta Racing	49†	15	20	57†	Ret	31	Ret	0
—	(Hong Kong) Jonathan Hui	(United Kingdom) Ziggo Sport – Tempesta Racing		15	20	57†	Ret			0
—	(France) Alessandro Ghiretti	(Belgium) Boutsen VDS	Ret	Ret	17	16	22		Ret	0
—	(Netherlands) Robert de Haan	(United Kingdom) Paradine Competition	24	16					31	0
—	(Denmark) Conrad Laursen	(Denmark) Selected Car Racing			16	42	26			0
—	(Austria) Max Hofer (United Kingdom) Alex Malykhin	(Lithuania) Pure Rxcing	17	37†	31	58†	Ret	22	Ret	0
—	(Finland) Konsta Lappalainen	(United Kingdom) JMW Motorsport						30	17	0
—	(Slovenia) Alexey Nesov	(Lithuania) Pure Rxcing	17	37†	31	58†	Ret			0
—	(Slovenia) Alexey Nesov	(Germany) Tresor Attempto Racing							36	0
—	(Netherlands) Maxime Oosten	(Germany) HRT Ford Racing	26	Ret	37	19	18		20	0
—	(Germany) Finn Wiebelhaus	(Germany) HRT Ford Racing	26	Ret	37	19	18			0
—	(Germany) Max Reis	(Germany) HRT Ford Racing			37	19	18			0
—	(Germany) Marvin Dienst (Italy) Gabriele Piana (Russia) Rinat Salikhov	(United States) Winward Racing	22	35†	40	31	21	25	18	0
—	(Italy) Mirko Bortolotti (France) Franck Perera	(Austria) TGI Team by GRT	39	Ret	60	60†	Ret	18	51	0
—	(United Kingdom) Sandy Mitchell	(Austria) TGI Team by GRT						18		0
—	(Switzerland) Alex Fontana (Germany) Patrick Kolb (Canada) Bashar Mardini	(Germany) Lionspeed GP	Ret	21	41	27	20	44	46	0
—	(France) Sébastien Baud (Belgium) Kobe Pauwels (Sweden) Oliver Söderström	(Belgium) Comtoyou Racing	20	27	28	59†	Ret	24	32	0
—	(Zimbabwe) Axcil Jefferies	(Germany) Lionspeed GP			41	27	20			0
—	(Zimbabwe) Axcil Jefferies	(Germany) Rinaldi Racing							41	0
—	(Netherlands) Mex Jansen	(United Kingdom) Ziggo Sport – Tempesta Racing			20	57†	Ret			0
—	(Denmark) Dennis Lind	(United Kingdom) Steller Motorsport	38	26	58	45	41	21	48	0
—	(France) Antoine Doquin	(United Kingdom) Steller Motorsport	38	26	58	45	41	21		0
—	(Denmark) Mikkel Mac	(United Kingdom) Steller Motorsport		26				21	48	0
—	(Netherlands) "Daan Arrow"	(United States) Winward Racing			40	31	21			0
—	(Germany) Tim Heinemann	(United Kingdom) JMW Motorsport	Ret	22	36	55†	Ret	30		0
—	(Switzerland) Rolf Ineichen	(United Kingdom) JMW Motorsport	Ret	22	36	55†	Ret			0
—	(Germany) Thomas Kiefer	(United Kingdom) JMW Motorsport		22	36	55†	Ret			0
—	(Denmark) Mikkel O. Pedersen	(Lithuania) Pure Rxcing						22	Ret	0
—	(Australia) Christian Mansell	(Germany) Team Motopark			44	36	23		22	0
—	(Germany) Tom Kalender (Luxembourg) Gabriel Rindone	(United Arab Emirates) GetSpeed Team Dubai	36	31	23	28	47	Ret	40	0
—	(Canada) Mikaël Grenier	(United Arab Emirates) GetSpeed Team Dubai	36	31	23	28	47		40	0
—	(South Africa) Jarrod Waberski	(United Arab Emirates) GetSpeed Team Dubai			23	28	47			0
—	(Angola) Rui Andrade (Switzerland) Yannick Mettler (Hungary) Levente Révész	(Germany) Team Motopark			44	36	23			0
—	(Belgium) Dries Vanthoor	(United Kingdom) Paradine Competition	23					36		0
—	(United Kingdom) Aaron Walker	(Bahrain) 2 Seas Motorsport			61	53	44			0
—	(United Kingdom) Aaron Walker	(Germany) Team Motopark							22	0
—	(France) Étienne Cheli (Argentina) Ezequiel Pérez Companc	(France) Saintéloc Racing	30	36†	25	40	30	Ret	24	0
—	(Ukraine) Ivan Klymenko	(France) Saintéloc Racing	30	36†	25	40	30		24	0
—	(Brazil) Christian Hahn	(United Kingdom) Paradine Competition	24	34	69†	69†	Ret	34	25	0
—	(United Kingdom) Harry George (United Kingdom) Adam Smalley (United Kingdom) Freddie Tomlinson	(United Kingdom) Optimum Motorsport	45	Ret	47	37	24	28	27	0
—	(Ecuador) Mateo Villagómez	(Germany) Walkenhorst Motorsport	34	24	68†	68†	Ret	41	45	0
—	(Switzerland) Ethan Ischer (France) Gaspard Simon	(Germany) Walkenhorst Motorsport	34	24	68†	68†	Ret	41		0
—	(Netherlands) Ruben del Sarte	(United Kingdom) Optimum Motorsport			47	37	24			0
—	(United Kingdom) Ashley Sutton	(United Kingdom) Paradine Competition	24							0
—	(Germany) Sven Müller	(Germany) Rutronik Racing		38†	29	25	43	Ret		0
—	(Denmark) Michelle Gatting (Estonia) Martin Rump	(Germany) Rutronik Racing			29	25	43			0
—	(Switzerland) Lucas Légeret	(France) Saintéloc Racing			25	40	30			0
—	(Switzerland) Lucas Légeret	(Germany) Walkenhorst Motorsport							45	0
—	(Germany) Ralf Bohn (Netherlands) Huub van Eijndhoven	(Germany) Herberth Motorsport	35	25	39	32	46	35	37	0
—	(United Kingdom) Josh Rowledge	(United Kingdom) Paradine Competition		34	69†	69†	Ret	34	25	0
—	(Germany) Robert Renauer	(Germany) Herberth Motorsport	35	25				35	37	0
—	(France) Loris Cabirou	(Italy) Dinamic GT			48	35	25			0
—	(France) Loris Cabirou	(France) CSA Racing							34	0
—	(Poland) Karol Basz	(United States) GetSpeed Team Bartone Bros			33	26	28			0
—	(Germany) Constantin Dressler	(Switzerland) Kessel Racing						26		0
—	(Australia) Garnet Patterson	(Bahrain) 2 Seas Motorsport			38	30	27			0
—	(France) Romain Leroux	(United Kingdom) Ecurie Ecosse Blackthorn			27	41	31			0
—	(France) Arthur Dorison	(Belgium) Comtoyou Racing			28	59†	Ret			0
—	(Italy) Daniele Di Amato (Germany) Carrie Schreiner	(Germany) Tresor Attempto Racing	43	29	54	56†	Ret	42	36	0
—	(United Kingdom) Ben Green (Malaysia) Prince Abu Bakar Ibrahim (Malaysia) Prince Jefri Ibrahim (Australia) Jordan Love	(Malaysia) Johor Motorsports Racing JMR			51	38	29			0
—	(Austria) Gerhard Tweraser	(Austria) Razoon - more than racing	40							0
—	(Austria) Gerhard Tweraser	(Germany) Tresor Attempto Racing		29				42		0
—	(Netherlands) Thierry Vermeulen	(United Kingdom) JMW Motorsport						30		0
—	(Italy) Enzo Trulli	(Lithuania) Pure Rxcing			31	58†	Ret			0
—	(Republic of Ireland) Peter Dempsey	(Italy) AF Corse			66†	66†	Ret			0
—	(Republic of Ireland) Peter Dempsey	(United Kingdom) Ziggo Sport – Tempesta Racing						31		0
—	(France) Mathieu Jaminet (Germany) Alfred Renauer	(Germany) Herberth Motorsport			39	32	46			0
—	(Denmark) Anders Fjordbach (China) Kerong Li (China) Leo Ye Hongli (China) Yuan Bo	(Denmark) High Class Racing			46	39	32			0
—	(Netherlands) Colin Caresani (Mexico) Alfredo Hernández (France) Stéphane Tribaudini	(Belgium) Grupo Prom Racing Team	47	32	63†	63†	Ret	46		0
—	(Belgium) Benjamin Paque	(Austria) Razoon - more than racing	40							0
—	(Belgium) Benjamin Paque	(Germany) GetSpeed Team PCX			50	34	33			0
—	(France) Jordan Boisson (France) Patrick Charlaix (France) Marvin Klein	(Germany) GetSpeed Team PCX			50	34	33		42	0
—	(India) Sai Sanjay	(France) CSA Racing			45	33	40			0
—	(United Kingdom) Bobby Thompson	(United Kingdom) Paradine Competition		34				34		0
—	(Australia) Jayden Kelly (Spain) Tommy Pintos (United Kingdom) Josh Rattican	(United Kingdom) Greystone GT	Ret	42†	34	52	37	Ret	Ret	0
—	(United Kingdom) Zac Meakin	(United Kingdom) Greystone GT			34	52	37			0
—	(United Kingdom) James Higgins (France) Jean-Baptiste Simmenauer	(France) CSA Racing						Ret	34	0
—	(United States) Wyatt Brichacek	(United Kingdom) Team RJN			59	50	35			0
—	(Netherlands) Jop Rappange	(United Kingdom) Paradine Competition			69†	69†	Ret			0
—	(Netherlands) Jop Rappange	(Netherlands) KPX Motorsport							35	0
—	(France) Pierre-Louis Chovet	(United Kingdom) JMW Motorsport			36	55†	Ret			0
—	(United States) AJ Muss (Brazil) Marcelo Tomasoni	(Belgium) Comtoyou Racing	44	39†	52	44	Ret	45	38	0
—	(Italy) Fabio Babini (Japan) Hiroshi Hamaguchi (Italy) Johannes Zelger	(San Marino) Tsunami RT			53	47	38			0
—	(Spain) Lorenzo Fluxá	(United Kingdom) Steller Motorsport	38							0
—	(Canada) Kyle Marcelli	(Belgium) Comtoyou Racing	44	39†	52	44	Ret			0
—	(Canada) Reinhold Krahn (Germany) Joel Sturm	(Germany) Car Collection Motorsport			49	46	39		44	0
—	(Switzerland) Nicolò Rosi (Italy) Niccolò Schirò	(Germany) Car Collection Motorsport			49	46	39			0
—	(Germany) Maximilian Paul	(Austria) TGI Team by GRT	39	Ret	60	60†	Ret		51	0
—	(Germany) Lenny Ried	(Austria) Razoon - more than racing		40†						0
—	(Germany) Lenny Ried	(United Kingdom) Steller Motorsport			58	45	41			0
—	(Greece) Georgios Kolovos	(Austria) Razoon - more than racing		40†						0
—	(Greece) Georgios Kolovos	(Germany) Tresor Attempto Racing			54	56†	Ret			0
—	(Austria) Dominik Olbert	(Austria) Razoon - more than racing	40							0
—	(Greece) Stylianos Kolovos	(Austria) Razoon - more than racing		40†						0
—	(Denmark) Mikkel Gaarde Pedersen	(United Kingdom) Steller Motorsport			58	45	41			0
—	(United Kingdom) Tom Wood	(United Kingdom) Ecurie Ecosse Blackthorn	41							0
—	(United Kingdom) Kenzie Beecroft (Thailand) Carl Bennett (Australia) Bryce Fullwood (United Kingdom) Ed McDermott	(Austria) Razoon - more than racing			56	54	42			0
—	(Belgium) Sarah Bovy (Belgium) Xavier Knauf (Belgium) Grégory Servais	(Belgium) Comtoyou Racing			43	43	Ret			0
—	(Italy) Alberto Di Folco	(Germany) Tresor Attempto Racing	43							0
—	(Italy) Felice Jelmini	(Belgium) Comtoyou Racing			52	44	Ret			0
—	(United States) Jason Hart (United States) Scott Noble	(United States) GetSpeed Team Noble Racing	46							0
—	(United States) Jason Hart (United States) Scott Noble	(Bahrain) 2 Seas Motorsport			61	53	44			0
—	(United Kingdom) Lewis Williamson	(Bahrain) 2 Seas Motorsport			61	53	44			0
—	(Belgium) Armand Fumal (Australia) Bayley Hall (Australia) Andres Latorre Canon (Germany) Tobias Müller	(Belgium) Mühlner Motorsport			57	49	45			0
—	(Brazil) Sérgio Sette Câmara	(Germany) Tresor Attempto Racing			54	56†	Ret			0
—	(Brazil) Sérgio Sette Câmara	(Belgium) Comtoyou Racing						45		0
—	(Slovenia) Mark Kastelic	(Germany) Tresor Attempto Racing			67†	67†	Ret			0
—	(Slovenia) Mark Kastelic	(Germany) Walkenhorst Motorsport							45	0
—	(Switzerland) Philip Ellis	(United States) GetSpeed Team Noble Racing	46							0
—	(Switzerland) Philip Ellis	(Germany) Team Motopark							Ret	0
—	(Brazil) Pedro Ebrahim	Oman Racing by Century Motorsport			55	48	Ret			0
—	(Spain) Mari Boya (Spain) Roberto Merhi (Canada) Lance Stroll	(Belgium) Comtoyou Racing	48†							0
—	(Italy) Stefano Costantini	(United Kingdom) Ziggo Sport – Tempesta Racing	49†							0
—	(United Kingdom) Adam Christodoulou	(Belgium) Grupo Prom Racing Team			63†	63†	Ret			0
—	(Belgium) Simon Balcaen (Belgium) Mathieu Castelein (Belgium) Pierre Castelein (France) Steven Palette	(Belgium) HAAS RT			64†	64†	Ret			0
—	(Spain) Miguel Molina (Brazil) Custodio Toledo (France) Matthieu Vaxivière	(Italy) AF Corse			66†	66†	Ret			0
—	(France) Maxime Robin	(Germany) Walkenhorst Motorsport			68†	68†	Ret			0
—	(Mexico) Ian Aguilera	(United Kingdom) Paradine Competition			69†	69†	Ret			0
—	(United States) Chandler Hull	(United Kingdom) JMW Motorsport	Ret							0
—	(Australia) Jayden Ojeda	(United Arab Emirates) GetSpeed Team Dubai						Ret		0
Guest drivers ineligible to score points
—	(Estonia) Ralf Aron	(Germany) Mercedes-AMG Team GetSpeed							1	0
—	(United Kingdom) Jack Hawksworth	(United Kingdom) Garage 59							6^{F}	0
—	(United Kingdom) Ben Barnicoat (Netherlands) Max Verstappen	(Netherlands) Mercedes-AMG Team Verstappen Racing							9	0
—	(Spain) Albert Costa	(Italy) AF Corse							10	0
—	(Italy) Nicola Lacorte	(Italy) AF Corse							11	0
—	(Italy) Giacomo Altoè (United Kingdom) Casper Stevenson	(United Kingdom) JMW Motorsport							17	0
—	(Austria) Philipp Eng (Germany) Marco Wittmann	(Germany) ROWE Racing							21	0
—	(Argentina) Marcos Siebert	(Germany) Team Motopark							22	0
—	(Philippines) Daryl De Leon	(United Kingdom) Paradine Competition							25	0
—	(Netherlands) Yelmer Buurman (Netherlands) Nigel Schoonderwoerd	(Netherlands) KPX Motorsport							35	0
—	(France) Valentin Hasse-Clot	(Belgium) Comtoyou Racing							38	0
—	(Italy) Max Mutschlechner (Austria) Leo Pichler (Austria) "Richard Wolf"	(Austria) Razoon – more than racing							43	0
—	(Italy) Pietro Armanni	(Germany) Car Collection Motorsport							44	0
—	(Brazil) Marcos Gomes (Brazil) Alan Hellmeister (Brazil) Sebá Malucelli	(Austria) Razoon – more than racing							47	0
—	(Denmark) Kasper H. Jensen	(United Kingdom) Steller Motorsport							48	0
—	(United States) Neil Verhagen	(Belgium) Team WRT							49	0
—	(Austria) Klaus Bachler (Germany) Max Moritz (Austria) Raphael Rennhofer	(Denmark) High Class Racing							Ret	0
—	(Austria) Dominik Baumann (Russia) Nikita Mazepin	(Germany) Team Motopark							Ret	0
—	(United Kingdom) Ross Gunn	(Belgium) Comtoyou Racing							Ret	0
—	(Germany) Lucas Wolf	(United Kingdom) Ziggo Sport – Tempesta Racing							Ret	0
Pos.	Drivers	Team	LEC (France)	MNZ (Italy)	SPA (Belgium)			NÜR (Germany)	ALG (Portugal)	Points
Pos.	Drivers	Team	LEC (France)	MNZ (Italy)	6hrs	12hrs	24hrs	NÜR (Germany)	ALG (Portugal)	Points

Key
Colour	Result
Gold	Race winner
Silver	2nd place
Bronze	3rd place
Green	Points finish
Blue	Non-points finish
Blue	Non-classified finish (NC)
Purple	Did not finish (Ret)
Black	Disqualified (DSQ)
Black	Excluded (EX)
White	Did not start (DNS)
White	Race cancelled (C)
White	Withdrew (WD)
Blank	Did not participate

^{P} – Pole
^{F} – Fastest Lap
^{2, 3} – Top 3 Super Pole positions at the 24 Hours of Spa

Notes:

- † – Entry did not finish the race but was classified, as it completed more than 75% of the race distance.

==== Gold Cup ====
Pos.	Drivers	Team	LEC (France)	MNZ (Italy)	SPA (Belgium)			NÜR (Germany)	ALG (Portugal)	Points
Pos.	Drivers	Team	LEC (France)	MNZ (Italy)	6hrs	12hrs	24hrs	NÜR (Germany)	ALG (Portugal)	Points
1	(Belgium) Ugo de Wilde (Germany) Jens Klingmann (Germany) Tim Tramnitz	(Germany) ROWE Racing	10	23	8	10	11	17	7	107
2	(Denmark) Simon Birch (Denmark) Malte Ebdrup (Denmark) Frederik Schandorff	(Denmark) Selected Car Racing	16	14	16	42	26	11	4^{P}	104
3	(United Kingdom) Tom Fleming (Germany) Benjamin Goethe (Monaco) Louis Prette	(United Kingdom) Garage 59	3^{PF}	18	4	3	36^{PF}	Ret^{P}	DSQ	86
4	(France) Simon Gachet (United Kingdom) James Kell	(France) CSA Racing	8	33	21	14	34	27	39	72
5	(France) Arthur Rougier	(France) CSA Racing	8	33	21	14	34	27		64
6	(Denmark) Dennis Lind	(United Kingdom) Steller Motorsport	38	26^{F}	58	45	41	21	48	49
7	(Sweden) Robin Knutsson (Belgium) Gilles Magnus	(Belgium) Boutsen VDS	Ret	Ret	17	16	22	8	Ret	48
8	(United Kingdom) Harry George (United Kingdom) Adam Smalley (United Kingdom) Freddie Tomlinson	(United Kingdom) Optimum Motorsport	45	Ret	47	37	24	28	27	48
9	(France) Antoine Doquin	(United Kingdom) Steller Motorsport	38	26^{F}	58	45	41	21		43
10	(Italy) Andrea Frassineti (Luxembourg) Dylan Pereira	(Germany) Tresor Attempto Racing	Ret	Ret^{P}	65†	65†	Ret	7^{F}	30^{F}	40
11	(Germany) Alex Aka	(Germany) Tresor Attempto Racing	Ret		65†	65†	Ret	7^{F}	30^{F}	39
12	(France) Alessandro Ghiretti	(Belgium) Boutsen VDS	Ret	Ret	17	16	22		Ret	30
13	(France) Jim Pla	(France) CSA Racing			21	14	34		39	30
14	(Denmark) Mikkel Mac	(United Kingdom) Steller Motorsport		26^{F}				21	48	28
15	(Netherlands) Ruben del Sarte	(United Kingdom) Optimum Motorsport			47	37	24			24
16	(Denmark) Conrad Laursen	(Denmark) Selected Car Racing			16	42	26			23
17	(Germany) Nico Menzel	(Belgium) Boutsen VDS						8		18
18	(Finland) Konsta Lappalainen	(United Kingdom) JMW Motorsport							17	15
19	(Netherlands) Robert de Haan (Brazil) Christian Hahn (United Kingdom) Ashley Sutton	(United Kingdom) Paradine Competition	24							12
20	(Denmark) Mikkel Gaarde Pedersen (Germany) Lenny Ried	(United Kingdom) Steller Motorsport			58	45	41			12
21	(Spain) Lorenzo Fluxá	(United Kingdom) Steller Motorsport	38							9
22	(Italy) Lorenzo Ferrari	(Germany) Tresor Attempto Racing		Ret^{P}						1
Guest drivers ineligible to score points
—	(Italy) Giacomo Altoè (United Kingdom) Casper Stevenson	(United Kingdom) JMW Motorsport							17	0
—	(Denmark) Kasper H. Jensen	(United Kingdom) Steller Motorsport							48	0
Pos.	Drivers	Team	LEC (France)	MNZ (Italy)	SPA (Belgium)			NÜR (Germany)	ALG (Portugal)	Points
Pos.	Drivers	Team	LEC (France)	MNZ (Italy)	6hrs	12hrs	24hrs	NÜR (Germany)	ALG (Portugal)	Points

==== Silver Cup ====
Pos.	Drivers	Team	LEC (France)	MNZ (Italy)	SPA (Belgium)			NÜR (Germany)	ALG (Portugal)	Points
Pos.	Drivers	Team	LEC (France)	MNZ (Italy)	6hrs	12hrs	24hrs	NÜR (Germany)	ALG (Portugal)	Points
1	(Belgium) Amaury Cordeel (Belgium) Matisse Lismont (Argentina) Ignacio Montenegro	(Belgium) Team WRT	18	17	24	20	15	14^{P}	5^{P}	113
2	(Philippines) Eduardo Coseteng	(Germany) HRT Ford Racing	26	Ret^{P}	37	19	18^{F}	13	20	66
3	(Israel) Ariel Levi (Italy) Rocco Mazzola (Denmark) Sebastian Øgaard	(Germany) Tresor Attempto Racing	21	1	67†	67†	Ret	37	15	59
4	(United States) Anthony Bartone (France) César Gazeau (France) Aurélien Panis	(United States) GetSpeed Team Bartone Bros	33	13	33	26	28^{P}	20	8^{F}	58
5	(Austria) Max Hofer (United Kingdom) Alex Malykhin	(Lithuania) Pure Rxcing	17	37†	31	58†	Ret	22	Ret	49
6	(Belgium) Jef Machiels (Belgium) Gilles Stadsbader (Peru) Matías Zagazeta	(Italy) AF Corse	31	Ret	26	13	16	32	28	47
7	(Portugal) Guilherme Oliveira (United Kingdom) Mikey Porter (Netherlands) Dante Rappange	(United Kingdom) Optimum Motorsport	Ret	Ret	30	11	17	Ret	19	41
8	(Netherlands) Maxime Oosten	(Germany) HRT Ford Racing	26	Ret^{P}	37	19	18^{F}		20	41
9	(France) Sébastien Baud (Belgium) Kobe Pauwels (Sweden) Oliver Söderström	(Belgium) Comtoyou Racing	20^{PF}	27	28	59†	Ret	24	32	39
10	(Slovenia) Alexey Nesov	(Lithuania) Pure Rxcing	17	37†	31	58†	Ret			37
11	(Belgium) Mathieu Detry	(Belgium) Team WRT			24	20	15			36
12	(Belgium) Nicolas Baert	(Germany) HRT Ford Racing						13	20	35
13	(United States) Dylan Medler (South Africa) David Perel	(Germany) Rinaldi Racing	42	19^{F}	42	29	14	Ret	41	35
13	(Spain) Rafael Durán	(Germany) Rinaldi Racing	42	19^{F}	42	29	14	Ret		35
14	(Italy) Francesco Braschi	(Italy) AF Corse			26	13	16			31
15	(Germany) Finn Wiebelhaus	(Germany) HRT Ford Racing	26	Ret^{P}	37	19	18^{F}			31
16	(Germany) Ben Dörr (United Kingdom) Horatio Fitz-Simon (United Kingdom) Max Lynn	(United Kingdom) Team RJN	32	6	59	50	35	39^{F}	23	30
17	(Italy) Alessandro Balzan	(Germany) Rinaldi Racing			42	29	14			29
18	(Germany) Salman Owega	(United Kingdom) Optimum Motorsport			30	11	17			29
19	(France) Étienne Cheli (Argentina) Ezequiel Pérez Companc	(France) Saintéloc Racing	30	36†	25	40	30	Ret	24	26
19	(Ukraine) Ivan Klymenko	(France) Saintéloc Racing	30	36†	25	40	30		24	26
20	(Germany) Niklas Kalus	(Germany) HRT Ford Racing						13		25
21	(France) Romain Andriolo	(France) CSA Racing	Ret	3	45	33	40	Ret	34	21
21	(Belgium) Lorens Lecertua	(France) CSA Racing	Ret	3	45	33	40			21
21	(Belgium) Lorens Lecertua	(France) Saintéloc Racing						Ret		21
21	(Belgium) Baptiste Moulin	(France) CSA Racing	Ret	3	45	33	40			21
22	(Thailand) Tanart Sathienthirakul (Italy) Francesco Simonazzi (United Kingdom) Angus Whiteside	(Italy) Dinamic GT	37	10	48	35	25	43	Ret	20
23	(Germany) Max Reis	(Germany) HRT Ford Racing			37	19	18^{F}			18
24	(Poland) Karol Basz	(United States) GetSpeed Team Bartone Bros			33	26	28^{P}			13
25	(Denmark) Mikkel O. Pedersen	(Lithuania) Pure Rxcing						22	Ret	12
26	(Brazil) Christian Hahn (United Kingdom) Josh Rowledge	(United Kingdom) Paradine Competition		34	69†	69†	Ret	34	25	11
27	(Switzerland) Lucas Légeret	(France) Saintéloc Racing			25	40	30			11
27	(Switzerland) Lucas Légeret	(Germany) Walkenhorst Motorsport							45	11
28	(Australia) Christian Mansell	(Germany) Team Motopark			44	36	23		22 (Note: Team Motopark #19 was a guest entrant ineligible for championship points.)	9
28	(Angola) Rui Andrade (Switzerland) Yannick Mettler (Hungary) Levente Révész	(Germany) Team Motopark			44	36	23			9
29	(France) Loris Cabirou	(Italy) Dinamic GT			48	35	25			8
29	(France) Loris Cabirou	(France) CSA Racing							34	8
30	(United Kingdom) Bobby Thompson	(United Kingdom) Paradine Competition		34				34		7
31	(Ecuador) Mateo Villagómez	(Germany) Walkenhorst Motorsport	34	24	68†	68†	Ret	41	45	6
31	(Switzerland) Ethan Ischer (France) Gaspard Simon	(Germany) Walkenhorst Motorsport	34	24	68†	68†	Ret	41		6
32	(France) Arthur Dorison	(Belgium) Comtoyou Racing			28	59†	Ret			6
33	(Italy) Enzo Trulli	(Lithuania) Pure Rxcing			31	58†	Ret			4
34	(India) Sai Sanjay	(France) CSA Racing			45	33	40			3
35	(Australia) Jayden Kelly (Spain) Tommy Pintos (United Kingdom) Josh Rattican	(United Kingdom) Greystone GT	Ret	42†	34	52	37	Ret	Ret	2
35	(United Kingdom) Zac Meakin	(United Kingdom) Greystone GT			34	52	37			2
36	(United States) Wyatt Brichacek	(United Kingdom) Team RJN			59	50	35			1
—	(United Kingdom) James Higgins (France) Jean-Baptiste Simmenauer	(France) CSA Racing						Ret	34	0
—	(Zimbabwe) Axcil Jefferies	(Germany) Rinaldi Racing							41	0
—	(Slovenia) Mark Kastelic	(Germany) Tresor Attempto Racing			67†	67†	Ret			0
—	(Slovenia) Mark Kastelic	(Germany) Walkenhorst Motorsport							45	0
—	(France) Maxime Robin	(Germany) Walkenhorst Motorsport			68†	68†	Ret			0
—	(Mexico) Ian Aguilera (Netherlands) Jop Rappange	(United Kingdom) Paradine Competition			69†	69†	Ret			0
Guest drivers ineligible to score points
—	(Argentina) Marcos Siebert (United Kingdom) Aaron Walker	(Germany) Team Motopark							22	0
—	(Philippines) Daryl De Leon	(United Kingdom) Paradine Competition							25	0
Pos.	Drivers	Team	LEC (France)	MNZ (Italy)	SPA (Belgium)			NÜR (Germany)	ALG (Portugal)	Points
Pos.	Drivers	Team	LEC (France)	MNZ (Italy)	6hrs	12hrs	24hrs	NÜR (Germany)	ALG (Portugal)	Points

==== Bronze Cup ====
Pos.	Drivers	Team	LEC (France)	MNZ (Italy)	SPA (Belgium)			NÜR (Germany)	ALG (Portugal)	Points
Pos.	Drivers	Team	LEC (France)	MNZ (Italy)	6hrs	12hrs	24hrs	NÜR (Germany)	ALG (Portugal)	Points
1	(United States) Dustin Blattner	(Switzerland) Kessel Racing	28	8^{F}	14	1	10^{P}		33	97
2	(United Kingdom) James Kellett (United Kingdom) Darren Leung	(United Kingdom) Paradine Competition	23	26	19	2	13	36^{F}	31^{P}	84
3	(Republic of Ireland) Reece Barr (United Kingdom) Charles Dawson (United Kingdom) Kiern Jewiss	(Bahrain) 2 Seas Motorsport	27	41†	38	30	27	23^{P}	13	82
4	(Germany) Marvin Dienst (Italy) Gabriele Piana (Russia) Rinat Salikhov	(United States) Winward Racing	22	35†^{P}	40	31	21	25	18	76
5	(Italy) Lorenzo Patrese	(Switzerland) Kessel Racing	28	8^{F}				26	33	62
6	(Hong Kong) Antares Au	(Germany) Rutronik Racing	13^{F}	38†	29	25	43^{F}	Ret		50
7	(France) Mathys Jaubert (United Kingdom) Ben Tuck	(Switzerland) Kessel Racing			14	1	10^{P}			50
8	(Oman) Ahmad Al Harthy (Spain) Javier Sagrera (Australia) Calan Williams	Oman Racing by Century Motorsport	29	12	55	48	Ret	33	26	49
9	(South Africa) Leyton Fourie (United Kingdom) David Pittard	(United Kingdom) Paradine Competition			19	2	13			36
10	(Italy) Riccardo Pera	(Germany) Rutronik Racing	13^{F}	38†				Ret		33
10	(Netherlands) Loek Hartog	(Germany) Rutronik Racing	13^{F}							33
11	(United Kingdom) Jonny Adam (Italy) Giacomo Petrobelli	(United Kingdom) Ecurie Ecosse Blackthorn	41	9	27	41	31			33
12	(United Kingdom) Lorcan Hanafin	(United Kingdom) Ecurie Ecosse Blackthorn		9	27	41	31			32
13	(Switzerland) Alex Fontana (Germany) Patrick Kolb (Canada) Bashar Mardini	(Germany) Lionspeed GP	Ret	21	41	27	20	44	46	31
14	(Italy) Eddie Cheever III (United Kingdom) Chris Froggatt	(United Kingdom) Ziggo Sport – Tempesta Racing	49†	15	20	57†	Ret	31	Ret	31
15	(Germany) Ralf Bohn (Netherlands) Huub van Eijndhoven	(Germany) Herberth Motorsport	35^{P}	25	39	32	46	35	37	27
16	(Belgium) Dries Vanthoor	(United Kingdom) Paradine Competition	23					36^{F}		25
17	(Netherlands) Robert de Haan	(United Kingdom) Paradine Competition		26					31^{P}	23
18	(Germany) Robert Renauer	(Germany) Herberth Motorsport	35^{P}	25				35	37	23
19	(Zimbabwe) Axcil Jefferies	(Germany) Lionspeed GP			41	27	20			21
20	(Hong Kong) Jonathan Hui	(United Kingdom) Ziggo Sport – Tempesta Racing		15	20	57†	Ret			19
21	(Germany) Sven Müller	(Germany) Rutronik Racing		38†	29	25	43^{F}	Ret		17
21	(Denmark) Michelle Gatting (Estonia) Martin Rump	(Germany) Rutronik Racing			29	25	43^{F}			17
22	(Germany) Tom Kalender (Luxembourg) Gabriel Rindone	(United Arab Emirates) GetSpeed Team Dubai	36	31	23	28	47	Ret	40	17
22	(Canada) Mikaël Grenier	(United Arab Emirates) GetSpeed Team Dubai	36	31	23	28	47		40	17
23	(Australia) Garnet Patterson	(Bahrain) 2 Seas Motorsport			38	30	27			16
24	(Germany) Constantin Dressler	(Switzerland) Kessel Racing						26		15
25	(Netherlands) "Daan Arrow"	(United States) Winward Racing			40	31	21			15
26	(France) Romain Leroux	(United Kingdom) Ecurie Ecosse Blackthorn			27	41	31			14
27	(Republic of Ireland) Peter Dempsey	(United Kingdom) Ziggo Sport – Tempesta Racing						31		12
28	(Italy) Daniele Di Amato (Germany) Carrie Schreiner	(Germany) Tresor Attempto Racing	43	29	54	56†	Ret	42	36	12
29	(South Africa) Jarrod Waberski	(United Arab Emirates) GetSpeed Team Dubai			23	28	47			11
30	(Germany) Tim Heinemann (Switzerland) Rolf Ineichen	(United Kingdom) JMW Motorsport	Ret	22	36	55†	Ret			9
30	(Germany) Thomas Kiefer	(United Kingdom) JMW Motorsport		22	36	55†	Ret			9
31	(Netherlands) Jop Rappange	(Netherlands) KPX Motorsport							35	8
32	(Austria) Gerhard Tweraser	(Austria) Razoon - more than racing	40							8
32	(Austria) Gerhard Tweraser	(Germany) Tresor Attempto Racing		29				42		8
33	(Netherlands) Mex Jansen	(United Kingdom) Ziggo Sport – Tempesta Racing			20	57†	Ret			7
34	(Slovenia) Alexey Nesov	(Germany) Tresor Attempto Racing							36	6
35	(United States) Jason Hart (United States) Scott Noble	(United States) GetSpeed Team Noble Racing	46							4
35	(United States) Jason Hart (United States) Scott Noble	(Bahrain) 2 Seas Motorsport			61	53	44			4
35	(United Kingdom) Aaron Walker (United Kingdom) Lewis Williamson	(Bahrain) 2 Seas Motorsport			61	53	44			4
36	(France) Mathieu Jaminet (Germany) Alfred Renauer	(Germany) Herberth Motorsport			39	32	46			4
37	(United States) AJ Muss (Brazil) Marcelo Tomasoni	(Belgium) Comtoyou Racing	44	39†	52	44	Ret	45	38	3
38	(France) Pierre-Louis Chovet	(United Kingdom) JMW Motorsport			36	55†	Ret			3
39	(Belgium) Armand Fumal (Australia) Bayley Hall (Australia) Andres Latorre Canon (Germany) Tobias Müller	(Belgium) Mühlner Motorsport			57	49	45			2
39	(Austria) Dominik Olbert (Belgium) Benjamin Paque	(Austria) Razoon - more than racing	40							2
40	(United Kingdom) Tom Wood	(United Kingdom) Ecurie Ecosse Blackthorn	41							1
40	(Brazil) Sérgio Sette Câmara	(Germany) Tresor Attempto Racing			54	56†	Ret			1
40	(Brazil) Sérgio Sette Câmara	(Belgium) Comtoyou Racing						45		1
—	(Canada) Kyle Marcelli	(Belgium) Comtoyou Racing	44	39†	52	44	Ret			0
—	(Italy) Felice Jelmini	(Belgium) Comtoyou Racing			52	44	Ret			0
—	(Netherlands) Colin Caresani (Mexico) Alfredo Hernández (France) Stéphane Tribaudini	(Belgium) Grupo Prom Racing Team	47	32				46		0
—	(Italy) Alberto Di Folco	(Germany) Tresor Attempto Racing	43							0
—	(Greece) Georgios Kolovos	(Austria) Razoon - more than racing		40†						0
—	(Greece) Georgios Kolovos	(Germany) Tresor Attempto Racing			54	56†	Ret			0
—	(Switzerland) Philip Ellis	(United States) GetSpeed Team Noble Racing	46							0
—	(Brazil) Pedro Ebrahim	Oman Racing by Century Motorsport			55	48	Ret			0
—	(Greece) Stylianos Kolovos (Germany) Lenny Ried	(Austria) Razoon - more than racing		40†						0
—	(Italy) Stefano Costantini	(United Kingdom) Ziggo Sport – Tempesta Racing	49†							0
—	(United States) Chandler Hull	(United Kingdom) JMW Motorsport	Ret							0
—	(Australia) Jayden Ojeda	(United Arab Emirates) GetSpeed Team Dubai						Ret		0
Ineligible to win the championship as a solo Platinum-rated driver
–	(Germany) Dennis Marschall	(Switzerland) Kessel Racing	28	8^{F}	14	1	10^{P}	26	33	112
Guest drivers ineligible to score points
—	(Netherlands) Yelmer Buurman (Netherlands) Nigel Schoonderwoerd	(Netherlands) KPX Motorsport							35	0
—	(France) Valentin Hasse-Clot	(Belgium) Comtoyou Racing							38	0
—	(France) Jordan Boisson (France) Patrick Charlaix (France) Marvin Klein	(Germany) GetSpeed Team PCX							42^{F}	0
—	(Italy) Max Mutschlechner (Austria) Leo Pichler (Austria) "Richard Wolf"	(Austria) Razoon – more than racing							43	0
—	(Italy) Pietro Armanni (Canada) Reinhold Krahn (Germany) Joel Sturm	(Germany) Car Collection Motorsport							44	0
—	(Brazil) Marcos Gomes (Brazil) Alan Hellmeister (Brazil) Sebá Malucelli	(Austria) Razoon – more than racing							47	0
—	(Austria) Klaus Bachler (Germany) Max Moritz (Austria) Raphael Rennhofer	(Denmark) High Class Racing							Ret	0
—	(Germany) Lucas Wolf	(United Kingdom) Ziggo Sport – Tempesta Racing							Ret	0
Pos.	Drivers	Team	LEC (France)	MNZ (Italy)	SPA (Belgium)			NÜR (Germany)	ALG (Portugal)	Points
Pos.	Drivers	Team	LEC (France)	MNZ (Italy)	6hrs	12hrs	24hrs	NÜR (Germany)	ALG (Portugal)	Points

=== Team' Championship ===
Only the best finisher scored points for their team, with 1 car.

Pos.	Team	LEC (France)	MNZ (Italy)	SPA (Belgium)			NÜR (Germany)	ALG (Portugal)	Points
Pos.	Team	LEC (France)	MNZ (Italy)	6hrs	12hrs	24hrs	NÜR (Germany)	ALG (Portugal)	Points
1	(United States) Winward Racing (Note: Winward Racing & Mercedes AMG Team Mann-Filter)	2^{P}	2	3	4	2	4		86
2	(Belgium) Comtoyou Racing	1	27	11	22	Ret	1		58
3	(Belgium) Team WRT	4	17	2	8	6	2		56
4	(United Kingdom) Garage 59	3	18	4	3	36	10		34
5	(Germany) ROWE Racing	6	5	5	10	9	17		33
6	(Germany) Tresor Attempto Racing	21	1	54	56	Ret	7		31
7	(Germany) Lionspeed GP	Ret	21	15	5	1	15		30
8	(Bahrain) 2 Seas Motorsport (Note: Mercedes-AMG Team Verstappen Racing & 2 Seas Motorsport)	9	41	10	6	27	3		25
9	(Belgium) Boutsen VDS	11	4	7	15	8	8		23
10	(Switzerland) Kessel Racing	28	8	14	1	10	26		17
11	(Italy) AF Corse (Note: AF Corse & Selected Car Racing)	14	11	22	12	3^{P}	11		17
12	(Germany) HRT Ford Racing	25	Ret^{P}	6	7	18	6		16
13	(Germany) GetSpeed	7	13	33	26	28	5		16
14	(France) CSA Racing	8	3	21	14	34	27		19
15	(Austria) Eastalent Racing	15	20	1	51	Ret	Ret		12
16	(United Kingdom) Paradine Competition	23	16	19	2	13	34		9
17	(Germany) Walkenhorst Motorsport	34	24	32	9	7	16		7
18	(United Kingdom) Team RJN	32	6	59	50	35	39		8
19	(Germany) Rutronik Racing	13	7	18	18	19	19		6
20	(United Kingdom) Ecurie Ecosse Blackthorn	41	9	27	41	31			2
21	(Italy) Dinamic GT	37	10	48	35	25	43		1
22	(Germany) Rinaldi Racing	42	19	42	29	14	Ret		1
—	(France) Schumacher CLRT			12	17	4			0
—	(United Kingdom) Optimum Motorsport	45	Ret	30	11	17	28		0
—	Oman Racing by Century Motorsport	29	12	55	48	Ret	33		0
—	(Germany) Herberth Motorsport (Note: Ziggo Sport Tempesta Raacig & Herberth Motorsport)	35	15	20	32	46	31		0
—	(Lithuania) Pure Rxcing	17	37†	31	58†	Ret	22		0
—	(Austria) TGI Team by GRT	39	Ret	60	60	Ret	18		0
—	(United Kingdom) Steller Motorsport	38	26	58	45	41	21		0
—	(United Kingdom) JMW Motorsport	Ret	22	36	55†	Ret	30		0
—	(Germany) Team Motopark			44	36	23			0
—	(France) Saintéloc Racing	30	36†	25	40	30	Ret		0
—	(Malaysia) Johor Motorsports Racing JMR			51	38	29			0
—	(Denmark) High Class Racing			46	39	32			0
—	(Belgium) Grupo Prom Racing Team	47	32	63†	63†	Ret	46		0
—	(United Kingdom) Greystone GT	Ret	42†	34	52	37	Ret		0
—	(San Marino) Tsunami RT			53	47	38			0
—	(Germany) Car Collection Motorsport			49	46	39			0
—	(Austria) Razoon - more than racing	40	40	56	54	42			0
—	(Belgium) HAAS RT			64	64	Ret			0
Pos.	Team	LEC (France)	MNZ (Italy)	SPA (Belgium)			NÜR (Germany)	ALG (Portugal)	Points
Pos.	Team	LEC (France)	MNZ (Italy)	6hrs	12hrs	24hrs	NÜR (Germany)	ALG (Portugal)	Points

== See also ==
- 2026 British GT Championship
- 2026 GT World Challenge Europe
- 2026 GT World Challenge Europe Sprint Cup
- 2026 GT World Challenge Asia
- 2026 GT World Challenge America
- 2026 GT World Challenge Australia
- 2026 Intercontinental GT Challenge
- 2026 GT3 Revival Series
