= Leyton Fourie =

South African racing driver (born 2005)

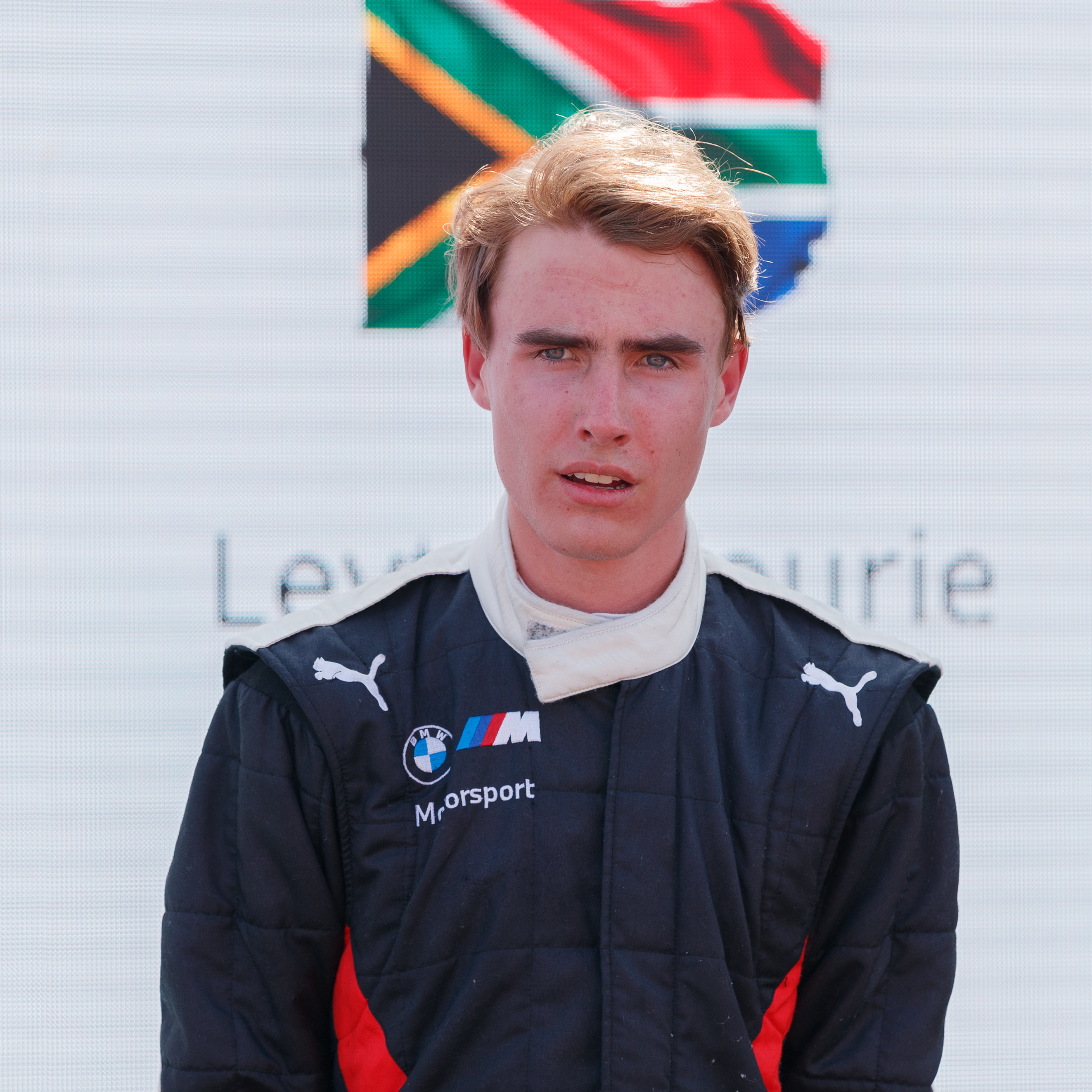
- Fourie in 2023
- Nationality: (South Africa) South African
- Born: Leyton Daniel Fourie; 23 September 2005 (age 21) Alberton, South Africa
- Categorisation: FIA Silver

Championship titles
- 2023 2022 2021 2021: BMW M2 Cup Germany; Global Touring Car Championship – GTC Supacup; Pozidrive VW Challenge – Class B Volkswagen Polo Cup South Africa

Leyton Daniel Fourie (born 23 September 2005) is a South African racing driver who last competed in ADAC GT Masters for FK Performance Motorsport. A product of the BMW Motorsport ladder, he was ADAC GT Masters runner-up in 2025.

== Career ==
Fourie began karting in 2012, competing until 2019. Racing in his native South Africa, Fourie won the 2016 SA Vortex Mini ROK Cup title, before winning the African Open Championship and the Rotax Mini Max Gauteng Regional Championships in Mini Max the following year.

Moving up to car racing in 2020, Fourie made his debut in Volkswagen Polo Cup South Africa, scoring a lone win at Red Star Raceway. Remaining in the series for 2021, Fourie clinched the title with five wins to his name, in a year in which he also secured the Class B title of the Pozidrive VW Challenge. Switching to the Global Touring Car Championship in 2022, Fourie won six times and took five other podiums to clinch the GTC Supacup title. That year, Fourie also made his debut in the Project 1 Motorsport centrally-run BMW M2 Cup Germany finale at the Hockenheimring, taking a best result of third in race two.

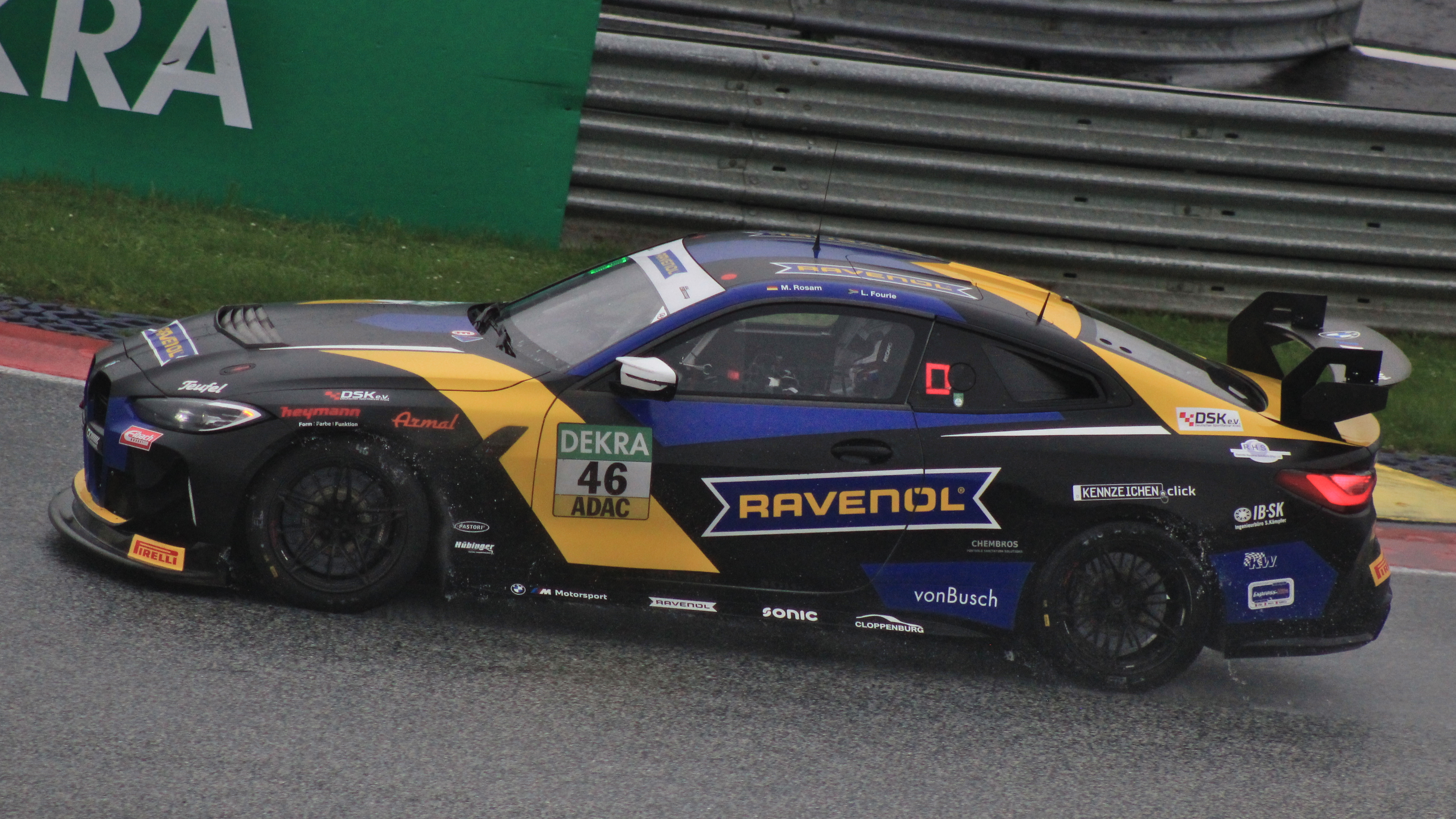
Fourie's FK Performance BMW M4 GT4 in ADAC GT4 Germany at the Red Bull Ring in 2024.

Moving to Europe full-time for 2023, Fourie won the BMW M2 Cup Germany title with six wins and five other podiums to his name. He also won in all four of his starts in BMW M2 Cup Benelux for Bas Koeten Racing, as well as making his ADAC GT4 Germany debut for Project 1 and winning the Kyalami 9 Hours in a Nova NP02 for Rico Barlow Racing. Remaining with Project 1 for 2024, Fourie entered ADAC GT4 Germany full-time, sharing a BMW M4 GT4 with Max Rosam. In his only season in the series, Fourie took a best result of second at both the Lausitzring and Norisring en route to a fourth-place points finish.

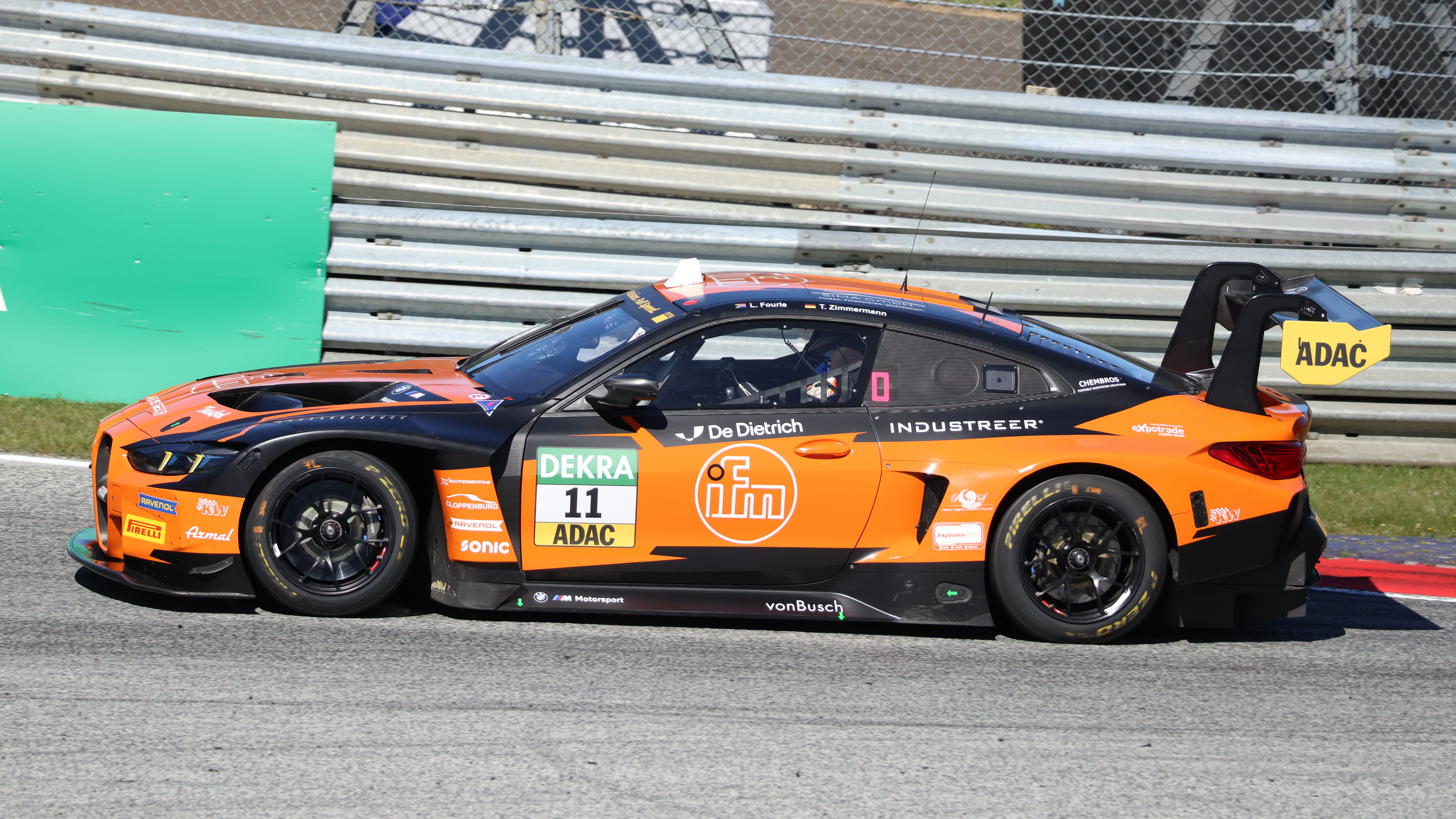
Fourie's FK Performance BMW M4 GT3 Evo in ADAC GT Masters at the Red Bull Ring in 2026.

In 2025, Fourie joined FK Performance Motorsport to step up to ADAC GT Masters, sharing a BMW M4 GT3 Evo with Tim Zimmermann. In his rookie season, Fourie won at Zandvoort and the Salzburgring, where he set pole position, and strung together two further podiums to end the season runner-up in points. In 2026, Fourie continued with FK Performance for his sophomore season in ADAC GT Masters alongside Zimmermann. Fourie won at Zandvoort and the Lausitzring to lead the standings at the halfway mark of the season, before winning at the Salzburgring and scoring two other podiums to end the year runner-up. That year, Fourie also finished second in the Bronze Cup on his 24 Hours of Spa debut for Paradine Competition, as well as taking an SP9 Pro podium at NLS7 with FK Performance.

== Karting record ==
=== Karting career summary ===
Season	Series	Team	Position
2017	RMC Grand Finals – Mini Max	KMS Europe	6th
2019	RMC Euro Trophy – Junior Max		12th
2019	ROK Cup Superfinal – Junior ROK		NC

== Racing record ==
=== Racing career summary ===
Season	Series	Team	Races	Wins	Poles	F/Laps	Podiums	Points	Position
2020	Volkswagen Polo Cup South Africa		3	1	1	0	2	98	7th
2021	Volkswagen Polo Cup South Africa		16	5	6	4	13	278	**1st**
2021	Pozidrive VW Challenge – Class B		14	6	5	11	12	120	**1st**
2022	Global Touring Car Championship – GTC Supacup	Express Hire Pty Ltd	14	6	4	5	11	231	**1st**
2022	BMW M2 Cup Germany	Project 1							
2023	BMW M2 Cup Germany	Project 1	12	6	4	0	11	206	**1st**
2023	BMW M2 Cup Benelux	Bas Koeten Racing	4	4	4	4	4	189	**3rd**
2023	ADAC GT4 Germany	Project 1	2	0	0	0	0	0	NC
2023	Kyalami 9 Hours	Adjust4Sleep / Rico Barlow Racing	1	1	0	0	1	—N/a	**1st**
2024	ADAC GT4 Germany	FK Performance Motorsport	12	0	0	1	2	117	4th
2024	Nürburgring Langstrecken-Serie – BMW M240i	Adrenalin Motorsport Team Mainhatten Wheels	2	0	0	0	2	0	NC
2024	24 Hours of Nürburgring – SP10	FK Performance Motorsport	1	0	0	0	1	—N/a	**2nd**
2024	Nürburgring Langstrecken-Serie – SP10	FK Performance Motorsport	1	1	0	0	1	0	NC
2025	ADAC GT Masters	FK Performance Motorsport	12	2	1	3	4	165	**2nd**
2026	ADAC GT Masters	FK Performance Motorsport	12	3	0	0	7	214	**2nd**
2026	24 Hours of Nürburgring – SP10	FK Performance Motorsport	1	0	0	0	0	—N/a	DNF
2026	Nürburgring Langstrecken-Serie – SP9 Pro	FK Performance Motorsport	1	0	0	0	1	5	NC
2026	GT World Challenge Europe Endurance Cup	Paradine Competition	1	0	0	0	0	9	26th
2026	GT World Challenge Europe Endurance Cup – Bronze	Paradine Competition	1	0	0	0	1	36	9th
2026	Intercontinental GT Challenge	Paradine Competition	1	0	0	0	0	0	NC

* Season still in progress.
^{†} As Fourie was a guest driver, he was ineligible for points.

=== Complete ADAC GT4 Germany results ===
(key) (Races in bold indicate pole position) (Races in italics indicate fastest lap)

Year	Team	Car	1	2	3	4	5	6	7	8	9	10	11	12	DC	Points
2023	Project 1	BMW M4 GT4	OSC; 1	OSC; 2	ZAN; 1	ZAN; 2	NÜR; 1	NÜR; 2	LAU; 1	LAU; 2	SAC; 1	SAC; 2	HOC; 1 DSQ	HOC; 2 Ret	NC	0
2024	FK Performance Motorsport	BMW M4 GT4	OSC; 1 Ret	OSC; 2; 5	LAU; 1; 2	LAU; 2; 6	NOR; 1; 2	NOR; 2; 12	NÜR; 1; 4	NÜR; 2 Ret	RBR; 1 Ret	RBR; 2; 4	HOC; 1; 4	HOC; 2; 7	4th	117

=== Complete 24 Hours of Nürburgring results ===
Year	Team	Co-Drivers	Car	Class	Laps	Pos.	Class Pos.
2024	(Germany) FK Performance Motorsport	(Germany) Yannick Fübrich (Germany) Christian Konnerth (United Kingdom) Joseph Warhurst	BMW M4 GT4 Gen II	SP10	45	35th	**2nd**
2026	(Germany) FK Performance Motorsport	(Germany) Luca Link (Germany) Moritz Wiskirchen (Germany) Nick Wüstenhagen	BMW M4 GT4 (G82)	SP10	56	DNF	DNF

=== Complete ADAC GT Masters results ===
(key) (Races in bold indicate pole position) (Races in italics indicate fastest lap)

Year	Team	Car	1	2	3	4	5	6	7	8	9	10	11	12	DC	Points
2025	FK Performance Motorsport	BMW M4 GT3 Evo	LAU; 1; 6	LAU; 2; 8	ZAN; 1; 2	ZAN; 2; 1	NÜR; 1; 7	NÜR; 2; 4	SAL; 1; 6	**SAL**; **2**; 1^{1}	RBR; 1; 11^{3}	RBR; 2; 8	HOC; 1; 13	HOC; 2; 2^{2}	2nd	165
2026	FK Performance Motorsport	BMW M4 GT3 Evo	RBR; 1; 10	RBR; 2; 4	ZAN; 1; 1^{3}	ZAN; 2; 2^{3}	LAU; 1; 2^{3}	LAU; 2; 1^{2}	NÜR; 1; 3^{2}	NÜR; 2; 5	SAL; 1; 1	SAL; 2; 4	HOC; 1; 6	HOC; 2; 2	2nd	214

=== Complete GT World Challenge Europe results ===
==== GT World Challenge Europe Endurance Cup ====
(Races in bold indicate pole position) (Races in italics indicate fastest lap)

Year	Team	Car	Class	1	2	3	4	5	6	7	Pos.	Points
2026	Paradine Competition	BMW M4 GT3 Evo	Bronze	LEC	MNZ	SPA; 6H; 19	SPA; 12H; 2	SPA; 24H; 13	NÜR	ALG	9th	36
