= Aldo Scribante Circuit =

Racecourse in Gqeberha, South Africa

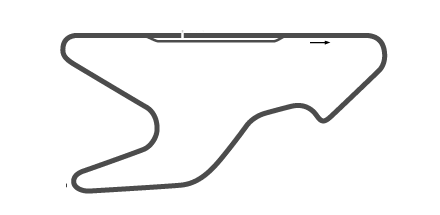
- Full Circuit (1975–present)
- Location: Gqeberha, South Africa
- Coordinates: 33°48′20″S 25°38′49″E
- Operator: Algoa Motorsport Club
- Broke ground: 1970s
- Opened: 30 November 1975; 50 years ago

Full Circuit (1975–present)
- Length: 2.480 km (1.541 mi)
- Turns: 8

The Aldo Scribante Race Circuit is a permanent racecourse near the city of Gqeberha in South Africa.

The 2.480 km (1.541 mi) paved circuit with eight curves and pit system was built in the 1970s. In 1975, the Algoa Motor Sport Club (AMSC) organized the first national race on the track. In addition to the national competitions, the track is also used by companies based in South Africa such as General Motors, Ford, Volkswagen, Bridgestone, Firestone, Goodyear and Continental as a test track.

The region around Port Elizabeth is the focus of the South African auto and supply industry and is also called the "Detroit of South Africa". The Aldo Scribante Circuit also serves to present new vehicle models in South Africa, with appropriate events from the companies.

Since 11 October 2014, the South African championship of Formula Vee South Africa has been held there.
