= Christian Krognes =

Norwegian racing driver (born 1990)

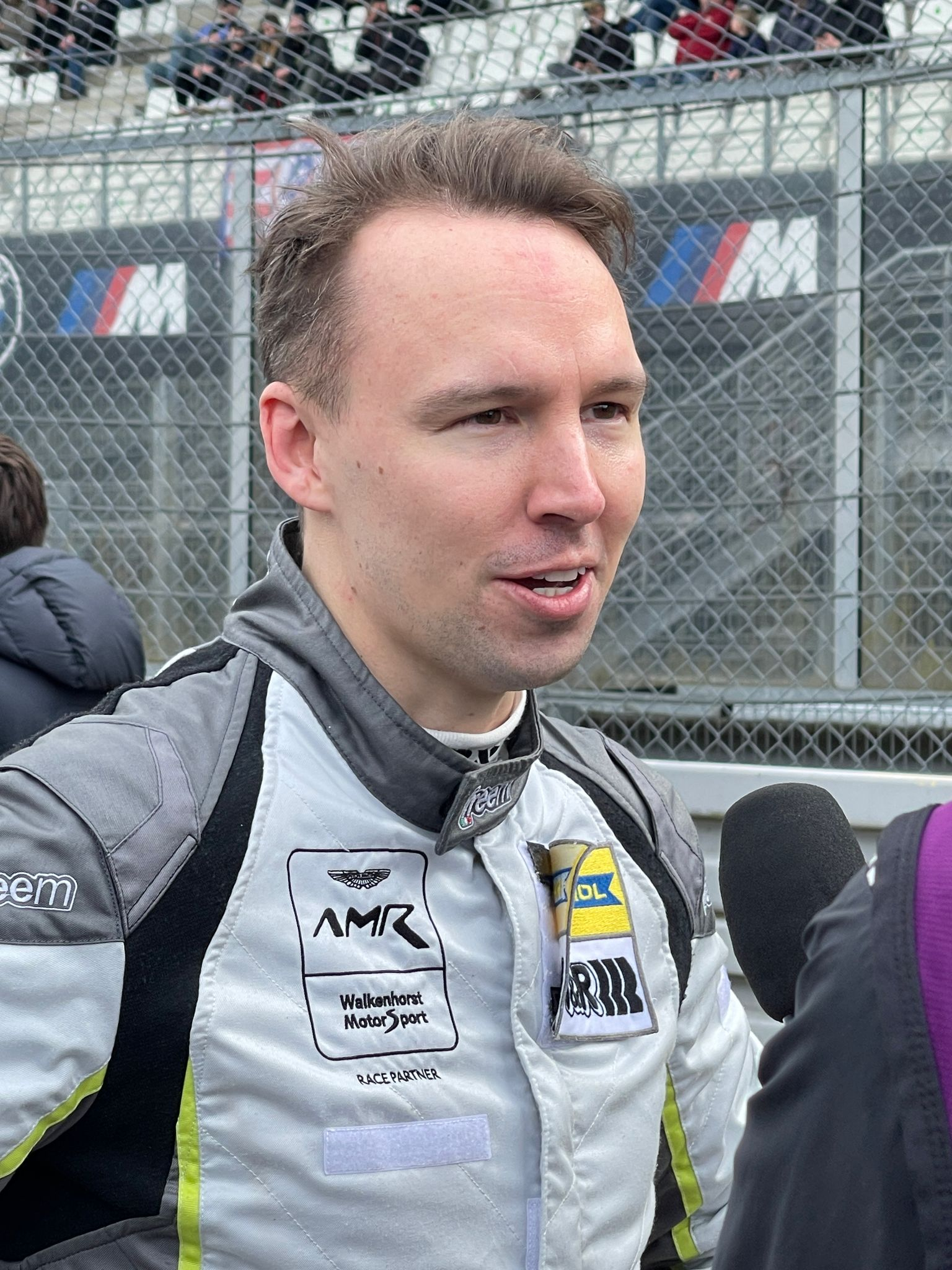
- Nationality: (Norway) Norwegian
- Born: 11 May 1990 (age 36) Hamar, Norway

GT World Challenge Europe Endurance Cup career
- Debut season: 2017
- Current team: Walkenhorst Motorsport
- Categorisation: FIA Silver (until 2018); FIA Gold (2019–)
- Car number: 34
- Starts: 6
- Wins: 1
- Podiums: 1
- Poles: 0
- Fastest laps: 0

Championship titles
- 2012: VLN Series – Overall

Christian Krognes (born 11 May 1990 in Hamar) is a Norwegian racing driver who currently competes for Walkenhorst Motorsport in the GT World Challenge Europe Endurance Cup. He was part of the BMW squad which won the 2018 24 Hours of Spa for Walkenhorst, and also holds the lap record at the Nürburgring's short combined layout used in NLS. As of 2025 he is an Aston Martin factory driver.

== Karting record ==
=== Karting career summary ===
Season	Series	Team	Position
2005	Swedish Championship - ICA Junior		14th
2005	Norwegian Championship ICA Junior		3rd
2005	Nordic Championship - ICA Junior		21st
2006	Tom Trana Trophy ICA		12th
2006	Norwegian Championship - ICA		6th
2006	Viking Trophy - ICA	Ward Racing	18th
2006	NEZ Championship ICA		27th
2007	CIK-FIA Viking Trophy KZ2	Ward Racing	2nd
2007	NEZ Championship KZ2		3rd
2007	Göteborgs Stora Pris - KZ2	Ward Racing	34th
2007	Norwegian Championship - KZ2		1st
2008	FIA Karting European Championship - KZ2	Energy Corse	13th
2008	Viking Trophy - KZ2	Energy Corse	5th
2008	Norwegian Championship - KZ2		1st
2009	Norwegian Championship - KZ2		3rd
2010	Norwegian Championship - KZ2		1st

== Racing record ==
=== Racing career summary ===
Season	Series	Team	Races	Wins	Poles	F/Laps	Podiums	Points	Position
2011	24 Hours of Nürburgring - SP3T	Møller Bil Motorsport	1	0	0	0	0	N/A	DNF
2012	VLN Series - SP3T	LMS Engineering	10	?	?	?	?	67.87	1st
2012	24 Hours of Nürburgring - SP3T	LMS Engineering	1	0	1	1	0	N/A	DNF
2015	24 Hours of Nürburgring - SP9	Team Premio	1	0	0	0	0	N/A	10th
2016	VLN Langstrecken Serie - SP9	Walkenhorst Motorsport	6	0	2	1	3	?	?
2016	24 Hours of Nürburgring - SP9	Walkenhorst Motorsport	1	0	0	0	0	N/A	12th
2016	International GT Open	Attempto Racing							
2017	VLN Langstrecken Serie - SP9	Walkenhorst Motorsport	8	0	0	1	2	?	?
2017	Blancpain GT Series Endurance - Pro Cup	Walkenhorst Motorsport	3	0	0	0	0	0	NC
2017	24 Hours of Nürburgring - SP9	Walkenhorst Motorsport	0	0	0	0	0	N/A	DNS
2017	Blancpain GT Series Endurance - Pro/Am Cup	Walkenhorst Motorsport	1	0	0	0	0	21	21st
2017	Intercontinental GT Challenge	Walkenhorst Motorsport	1	0	0	0	0	0	NC
2018	VLN Langstrecken Serie - SP9 Pro	Walkenhorst Motorsport	2	0	1	0	0	7.73	49th
2018	24 Hours of Nürburgring - SP9	BMW Team Schnitzer	1	0	0	0	0	N/A	12th
2018	Blancpain GT Series Endurance Cup - Pro	Walkenhorst Motorsport	1	1	0	0	1	43	6th
2019	VLN Langstrecken Serie - SP9 Pro	Walkenhorst Motorsport	6	0	2	2	2	22.02	13th
2019	Intercontinental GT Challenge	Walkenhorst Motorsport	5	0	0	0	1	24	21st
2019	24 Hours of Nürburgring - SP9 Pro	Walkenhorst Motorsport	1	0	0	0	0	N/A	DNF
2019	Blancpain GT Series Endurance Cup - Pro	Walkenhorst Motorsport	1	0	0	0	0	7	28th
2020	Nürburgring Langstrecken-Serie - SP9 Pro	Walkenhorst Motorsport	3	0	0	0	3	26.26	6th
2020	24 Hours of Nürburgring - SP9 Pro	Walkenhorst Motorsport	1	0	0	0	0	N/A	12th
2021	Nürburgring Langstrecken-Serie - SP9 Pro/Am	Walkenhorst Motorsport	6	1	1	0	1	?	?
2021	24 Hours of Nürburgring - SP9 Pro	Walkenhorst Motorsport	1	0	0	0	0	N/A	15th
2022	Nürburgring Langstrecken-Serie - SP9 Pro	Walkenhorst Motorsport	6	0	2	0	4	?	?
2022	24 Hours of Nürburgring - SP9 Pro	Walkenhorst Motorsport	1	0	0	0	0	N/A	DNF
2023	Nürburgring Langstrecken-Serie - SP9 Pro	Walkenhorst Motorsport	6	4	0	2	4	0	NC
2023	24 Hours of Nürburgring - SP9 Pro	Walkenhorst Motorsport	1	0	0	0	0	N/A	DNF
2024	Nürburgring Langstrecken-Serie - SP9 Pro	Walkenhorst Motorsport	2	0	0	0	0	?	?
2024	24 Hours of Nürburgring - SP9 Pro	Walkenhorst Motorsport	1	0	0	0	0	N/A	DNF
2025	Nürburgring Langstrecken-Serie - SP9	Walkenhorst Motorsport	8	0	1	0	1	0	NC
2025	24 Hours of Nürburgring - SP9 Pro	Walkenhorst Motorsport	1	0	0	0	0	N/A	DNF
2025	GT World Challenge Europe Endurance Cup	Walkenhorst Motorsport	4	0	0	0	0	5	24th
2026	Nürburgring Langstrecken-Serie - SP9	Walkenhorst Motorsport							
2026	GT World Challenge Europe Endurance Cup	natural elements by Walkenhorst Motorsport	4	0	0	0	0	7	28th
2026	24 Hours of Nürburgring - SP9	natural elements by Walkenhorst Motorsport	1	0	0	0	1	N/A	2nd

^{*} Season still in progress.

=== Complete 24 Hours of Nürburgring results ===
Year	Team	Co-Drivers	Car	Class	Laps	Pos.	Class Pos.
2011	(Norway) Møller Bil Motorsport	(Norway) Hakon Schjaerin (Norway) Atle Gulbrandsen (Norway) Kenneth Jensen Ostwold	Audi TT	SP3T	27	DNF	DNF
2012	(Finland) LMS Engineering	(Germany) Maik Rosenberg (Sweden) Lars Stugemo (Germany) Dominik Brinkmann	Volkswagen Scirocco GT24	SP3T	88	NC	NC
2015	(Germany) Team Premio	(Germany) Kenneth Heyer (Switzerland) Philipp Frommenwiler (United Kingdom) Robert Huff	Mercedes-Benz SLS AMG GT3	SP9 GT3	151	10th	10th
2016	(Germany) Walkenhorst Motorsport	(United Kingdom) Tom Blomqvist (Sweden) Victor Bouveng (Germany) Michele Di Martino	BMW M6 GT3	SP9	129	12th	12th
2017	(Germany) Walkenhorst Motorsport	(Germany) Michele Di Martino (Finland) Mathias Henkola (Germany) Nico Menzel	BMW M6 GT3	SP9	0	DNS	DNS
2018	(Germany) BMW Team Schnitzer	(Brazil) Augusto Farfus (Finland) Markus Palttala (Germany) Fabian Schiller	BMW M6 GT3	SP9	131	13th	12th
2019	(Germany) Walkenhorst Motorsport	(United Kingdom) David Pittard (Spain) Lucas Ordóñez (United Kingdom) Nick Yelloly	BMW M6 GT3	SP9 Pro	10	DNF	DNF
2020	(Germany) Walkenhorst Motorsport	(Denmark) Mikkel Jensen (South Africa) Jordan Pepper (United Kingdom) David Pittard	BMW M6 GT3	SP9 Pro	83	12th	12th
2021	(Germany) Walkenhorst Motorsport	(Germany) Jörg Müller (United Kingdom) David Pittard (United Kingdom) Ben Tuck	BMW M6 GT3	SP9 Pro	57	15th	15th
2022	(Germany) Walkenhorst Motorsport	(Germany) Jörg Müller (Spain) Andy Soucek (Finland) Sami-Matti Trogen	BMW M4 GT3	SP9 Pro	64	DNF	DNF
2023	(Germany) Walkenhorst Motorsport	(Poland) Kuba Giermaziak (Finland) Jesse Krohn (Spain) Andy Soucek	BMW M4 GT3	SP9 Pro	39	DNF	DNF
2023	(Germany) Walkenhorst Motorsport	(United Kingdom) Jake Dennis (Germany) Jens Klingmann (France) Thomas Neubauer	BMW M4 GT3	SP9 Pro	89	DNF	DNF
2024	(Germany) Walkenhorst Motorsport	(Poland) Kuba Giermaziak (United Kingdom) David Pittard (Denmark) Nicki Thiim	Aston Martin Vantage AMR GT3 Evo	SP9 Pro	26	DNF	DNF
2025	(Germany) Walkenhorst Motorsport	(Italy) Mattia Drudi (United Kingdom) David Pittard (Denmark) Nicki Thiim	Aston Martin Vantage AMR GT3 Evo	SP9 Pro	72	DNF	DNF
2026	(Germany) natural elements by Walkenhorst Motorsport	(Italy) Mattia Drudi (Denmark) Nicki Thiim	Aston Martin Vantage AMR GT3 Evo	SP9 Pro	156	2nd	2nd

=== Complete GT World Challenge Europe results ===
==== GT World Challenge Europe Endurance Cup ====
Year	Team	Car	Class	1	2	3	4	5	6	7	Pos.	Points
2017	Walkenhorst Motorsport	BMW M6 GT3	Pro	MNZ	SIL; 18	LEC; 26				CAT; Ret	NC	0
2017	Walkenhorst Motorsport	BMW M6 GT3	Pro-Am				SPA; 6H; 21	SPA; 12H; 23	SPA; 24H; 21		21st	21
2018	Walkenhorst Motorsport	BMW M6 GT3	Pro	MNZ	SIL	LEC	SPA; 6H; 4	SPA; 12H; 1	SPA; 24H; 1	CAT	6th	43
2019	Walkenhorst Motorsport	BMW M6 GT3	Pro	MNZ	SIL	LEC	SPA; 6H; 8	SPA; 12H; 5	SPA; 24H; 11	CAT	28th	7
2025	Walkenhorst Motorsport	Aston Martin Vantage AMR GT3 Evo	Pro	LEC; 8	MNZ; 12	SPA; 6H; WD	SPA; 12H; WD	SPA; 24H; WD	NÜR; 14	CAT; 10	24th	5
2026	natural elements by Walkenhorst Motorsport	Aston Martin Vantage AMR GT3 Evo	Pro	LEC; WD	MNZ; 28	SPA; 6H; 32	SPA; 12H; 9	SPA; 24H; 7	NÜR; 16	ALG; 12	28th	7

=== Complete Intercontinental GT Challenge results ===
Year	Manufacturer	Car	1	2	3	4	5	Pos.	Points
2017	BMW	BMW M6 GT3	BAT	SPA; 20	LAG			NC	0
2019	BMW	BMW M6 GT3	BAT; Ret	LAG; 8	SPA; 9	SUZ; Ret	KYA; 2	21st	24

=== Complete 24 Hours of Spa results ===
Year	Team	Co-Drivers	Car	Class	Laps	Pos.	Class Pos.
2017	(Germany) Walkenhorst Motorsport	(Finland) Markus Palttala (Germany) Nico Menzel (Finland) Matias Henkola	BMW M6 GT3	Pro-Am Cup	536	20th	5th
2018	(Germany) Walkenhorst Motorsport	(United Kingdom) Tom Blomqvist (Austria) Philipp Eng	BMW M6 GT3	Pro Cup	511	1st	1st
2019	(Germany) Walkenhorst Motorsport	(Denmark) Mikkel Jensen (Netherlands) Nick Catsburg	BMW M6 GT3	Pro Cup	362	11th	11th
