= 2019 California 8 Hours =

Race details
Date	March 30, 2019
Location	Monterey, United States
Course	3.602 km (2.238 mi)
- Race
Drivers	(Germany) Mario Farnbacher (Belgium) Bertrand Baguette (Netherlands) Renger van der Zande	(Italy) Honda Team Motul
Time	1:23.156

Podium
First	(Spain) Miguel Molina (Australia) Nick Foster (Australia) Tim Slade	(Taiwan) HubAuto Corsa
Second	(Germany) Maximilian Buhk (Germany) Maximilian Götz (Italy) Raffaele Marciello	(Hong Kong) Mercedes-AMG Team GruppeM Racing
Third	(France) Mathieu Jaminet (Germany) Sven Müller (France) Romain Dumas	(United States) Park Place Motorsports

The 2019 California 8 Hours was the third edition of the California 8 Hours race held on WeatherTech Raceway Laguna Seca on March 30, 2019. The race was contested with GT3-spec cars, "GT Cup" for one-make spec cars, and GT4-spec cars. The race was organized by the Stéphane Ratel Organisation (SRO).

The third and final California 8 Hours was the second round of the 2019 Intercontinental GT Challenge. The event was replaced on the Intercontinental GT Challenge calendar by the Indianapolis 8 Hour.

The race was won by Taiwanese Ferrari team HubAuto Corsa. The Ferrari 488 GT3 completed 327 laps in the allotted eight hours, making a race distance of over 730 miles. Miguel Molina, Nick Foster and Tim Slade beat Hong Kong Mercedes-AMG Team GruppeM Racing by twelve seconds. American Porsche team Park Place Motorsports was third.

Lamborghini team ARC Bratislava won the GT Cup class, finishing 24 laps behind the HubAuto Corsa Ferrari and completed 678 miles. Winning the GT4 class was the PF Racing Ford Mustang, a further seven laps down, completing 662 miles.

== Entries ==
No.	Entrant	Car	Driver 1	Driver 2	Driver 3
GT3 Entries
10	(Belgium) Audi Sport Team WRT	Audi R8 LMS GT3 Evo	(Germany) Christopher Haase	(Belgium) Dries Vanthoor	(Belgium) Frédéric Vervisch
18	(Hong Kong) KCMG	Nissan GT-R Nismo GT3	(Switzerland) Alexandre Imperatori	(United Kingdom) Oliver Jarvis	(Italy) Edoardo Liberati
27	(Taiwan) HubAuto Corsa	Ferrari 488 GT3	(Australia) Nick Foster	(Spain) Miguel Molina	(Australia) Tim Slade
29	(Germany) Audi Sport Team Land	Audi R8 LMS GT3 Evo	(Germany) Christopher Mies	(South Africa) Kelvin van der Linde	(Germany) Markus Winkelhock
30	(Italy) Honda Team Motul	Honda NSX GT3	(Belgium) Bertrand Baguette	(Germany) Mario Farnbacher	(Netherlands) Renger van der Zande
34	(Germany) Walkenhorst Motorsport	BMW M6 GT3	(Netherlands) Nicky Catsburg	(Denmark) Mikkel Jensen	(Norway) Christian Krognes
35	(Hong Kong) KCMG	Nissan GT-R Nismo GT3	(United Kingdom) Alex Buncombe	(Australia) Josh Burdon	(Japan) Katsumasa Chiyo
42	(Germany) BMW Team Schnitzer	BMW M6 GT3	(Brazil) Augusto Farfus	(Australia) Chaz Mostert	(Germany) Martin Tomczyk
43	(United Kingdom) Mercedes-AMG Team Strakka Racing	Mercedes-AMG GT3	(Austria) Dominik Baumann	(United Kingdom) Adam Christodoulou	(Denmark) Christina Nielsen
44	(United Kingdom) Mercedes-AMG Team Strakka Racing	Mercedes-AMG GT3	(United Kingdom) Gary Paffett	(France) Tristan Vautier	(United Kingdom) Lewis Williamson
107	(United Kingdom) Bentley Team M-Sport	Bentley Continental GT3	(France) Jules Gounon	(United Kingdom) Steven Kane	(South Africa) Jordan Pepper
108	(United Kingdom) Bentley Team M-Sport	Bentley Continental GT3	(Spain) Lucas Ordóñez	(Finland) Markus Paltalla	(Belgium) Maxime Soulet
888	(Hong Kong) Mercedes-AMG Team GruppeM Racing	Mercedes-AMG GT3	(Netherlands) Yelmur Buurman	(Germany) Maro Engel	(Germany) Luca Stolz
911	(United States) Park Place Motorsports	Porsche 911 GT3 R	(France) Romain Dumas	(France) Mathieu Jaminet	(Germany) Sven Müller
912	(United States) Wright Motorsports	Porsche 911 GT3 R	(Australia) Matt Campbell	(Norway) Dennis Olsen	(Germany) Dirk Werner
999	(Hong Kong) Mercedes-AMG Team GruppeM Racing	Mercedes-AMG GT3	(Germany) Maximilian Buhk	(Germany) Maximilian Götz	(Italy) Raffaele Marciello
GT Cup Entries
88	(Slovakia) ARC Bratislava	Lamborghini Huracan Super Trofeo	(Slovakia) Miro Konopka	(Poland) Andrzej Lewandowski	(Slovakia) Zdeno Mikulasko
GT4 Entries
41	(United States) PF Racing	Ford Mustang GT4	(United States) Jade Buford	(United States) Chad McCumbee	(United States) James Pesek
67	(United States) TRG	Porsche Cayman GT4 Clubsport MR	(United States) Jason Alexandridis	(United States) Chris Bellomo	(United States) Spencer Pumpelly
113	(United States) RHC-Lawrence/Strom by Storm Motorsport	Porsche Cayman GT4 Clubsport MR	(United States) Daren Jorgensen	(United States) Jon Miller	(United States) Brett Strom

Icon	Class
P	Pro Cup
PA	Pro-Am Cup

== Qualifying ==
=== Pole Shootout ===
These were the 10 fastest cars in qualifying

Pos	N°	Driver	Team	Car	Time	Dif
1	30	(Germany) Mario Farnbacher	(Italy) Honda Team Motul	Acura NSX GT3	1:23.156	
2	35	(United Kingdom) Alex Buncombe	(Hong Kong) KCMG	Nissan GT-R Nismo GT3	1:23.342	+0.186
3	10	(Belgium) Dries Vanthoor	(Belgium) Audi Sport Team WRT	Audi R8 LMS Evo	1:23.420	+0.264
4	27	(Australia) Nick Foster	(Taiwan) HubAuto Corsa	Ferrari 488 GT3	1:23.459	+0.303
5	912	(Australia) Matt Campbell	(United States) Wright Motorsports	Porsche 911 GT3 R	1:23.528	+0.372
6	34	(Denmark) Mikkel Jensen	(Germany) Walkenhorst Motorsport	BMW M6 GT3	1:23.533	+0.377
7	42	(Brazil) Augusto Farfus	(Germany) BMW Team Schnitzer	BMW M6 GT3	1:23.544	+0.388
8	911	(Germany) Mathieu Jaminet	(United States) Park Place Motorsports	Porsche 911 GT3 R	1:23.627	+0.471
9	18	(Switzerland) Alexandre Imperatori	(Hong Kong) KCMG	Nissan GT-R Nismo GT3	1:23.673	+0.517
10	999	(Italy) Raffaele Marciello	(Hong Kong) Mercedes-AMG Team GruppeM Racing	Mercedes-AMG GT3	1:29.714	+0.558

== Official results ==
Bold denotes category winner.

Pos.	Class	No.	Team / Entrant	Drivers	Car	Laps
Pos.	Class	No.	Team / Entrant	Drivers	Engine	Laps
1	GT3	**27**	**(Taiwan) HubAuto Corsa**	**(Australia) Nick Foster (Spain) Miguel Molina (Australia) Tim Slade**	**Ferrari 488 GT3**	**327**
1	GT3	**27**	**(Taiwan) HubAuto Corsa**	**(Australia) Nick Foster (Spain) Miguel Molina (Australia) Tim Slade**	**3.9 L Ferrari F154 twin-turbo V8**	**327**
2	GT3	999	(Hong Kong) Mercedes-AMG Team GruppeM Racing	(Germany) Maximilian Buhk (Germany) Maximilian Götz (Italy) Raffaele Marciello	Mercedes-AMG GT3	327
2	GT3	999	(Hong Kong) Mercedes-AMG Team GruppeM Racing	(Germany) Maximilian Buhk (Germany) Maximilian Götz (Italy) Raffaele Marciello	6.2 L Mercedes-Benz M159 V8	327
3	GT3	911	(United States) Park Place Motorsports	(France) Romain Dumas (France) Mathieu Jaminet (Germany) Sven Müller	Porsche 911 GT3 R	327
3	GT3	911	(United States) Park Place Motorsports	(France) Romain Dumas (France) Mathieu Jaminet (Germany) Sven Müller	4.0 L Porsche H6	327
4	GT3	10	(Belgium) Audi Sport Team WRT	(Germany) Christopher Haase (Belgium) Dries Vanthoor (Belgium) Frédéric Vervisch	Audi R8 LMS GT3 Evo	327
4	GT3	10	(Belgium) Audi Sport Team WRT	(Germany) Christopher Haase (Belgium) Dries Vanthoor (Belgium) Frédéric Vervisch	5.2 L FSI 2×DOHC Audi V10	327
5	GT3	42	(Germany) BMW Team Schnitzer	(Brazil) Augusto Farfus (Australia) Chaz Mostert (Germany) Martin Tomczyk	BMW M6 GT3	326
5	GT3	42	(Germany) BMW Team Schnitzer	(Brazil) Augusto Farfus (Australia) Chaz Mostert (Germany) Martin Tomczyk	4.4 L S63 BMW twin-turbo V8	326
6	GT3	888	(Hong Kong) Mercedes-AMG Team GruppeM Racing	(Netherlands) Yelmur Buurman (Germany) Maro Engel (Germany) Luca Stolz	Mercedes-AMG GT3	326
6	GT3	888	(Hong Kong) Mercedes-AMG Team GruppeM Racing	(Netherlands) Yelmur Buurman (Germany) Maro Engel (Germany) Luca Stolz	6.2 L Mercedes-Benz M159 V8	326
7	GT3	29	(Germany) Audi Sport Team Land	(Germany) Christopher Mies (South Africa) Kelvin van der Linde (Germany) Markus Winkelhock	Audi R8 LMS GT3 Evo	326
7	GT3	29	(Germany) Audi Sport Team Land	(Germany) Christopher Mies (South Africa) Kelvin van der Linde (Germany) Markus Winkelhock	5.2 L FSI 2×DOHC Audi V10	326
8	GT3	34	(Germany) Walkenhorst Motorsport	(Netherlands) Nick Catsburg (Denmark) Mikkel Jensen (Norway) Christian Krognes	BMW M6 GT3	326
8	GT3	34	(Germany) Walkenhorst Motorsport	(Netherlands) Nick Catsburg (Denmark) Mikkel Jensen (Norway) Christian Krognes	4.4 L S63 BMW twin-turbo V8	326
9	GT3	18	(Hong Kong) KCMG	(Switzerland) Alexandre Imperatori (United Kingdom) Oliver Jarvis (Italy) Edoardo Liberati	Nissan GT-R Nismo GT3	326
9	GT3	18	(Hong Kong) KCMG	(Switzerland) Alexandre Imperatori (United Kingdom) Oliver Jarvis (Italy) Edoardo Liberati	3.8 L Nissan VR38DETT twin-turbo V6	326
10	GT3	43	(United Kingdom) Strakka Racing	(Austria) Dominik Baumann (United Kingdom) Adam Christodoulou (Denmark) Christina Nielsen	Mercedes-AMG GT3	325
10	GT3	43	(United Kingdom) Strakka Racing	(Austria) Dominik Baumann (United Kingdom) Adam Christodoulou (Denmark) Christina Nielsen	6.2 L Mercedes-Benz M159 V8	325
11	GT3	108	(United Kingdom) Bentley Team M-Sport	(Spain) Lucas Ordóñez (Finland) Markus Paltalla (Belgium) Maxime Soulet	Bentley Continental GT3 (2018)	325
11	GT3	108	(United Kingdom) Bentley Team M-Sport	(Spain) Lucas Ordóñez (Finland) Markus Paltalla (Belgium) Maxime Soulet	4.0 L Volkswagen twin-turbo V8	325
12	GT3	35	(Hong Kong) KCMG	(United Kingdom) Alex Buncombe (Australia) Josh Burdon (Japan) Katsumasa Chiyo	Nissan GT-R Nismo GT3	315
12	GT3	35	(Hong Kong) KCMG	(United Kingdom) Alex Buncombe (Australia) Josh Burdon (Japan) Katsumasa Chiyo	3.8 L Nissan VR38DETT twin-turbo V6	315
13	GT3	30	(Italy) Honda Team Motul	(Belgium) Bertrand Baguette (Germany) Mario Farnbacher (Netherlands) Renger van der Zande	Acura NSX GT3 Evo	308
13	GT3	30	(Italy) Honda Team Motul	(Belgium) Bertrand Baguette (Germany) Mario Farnbacher (Netherlands) Renger van der Zande	3.5 L Honda JNC1 twin-turbocharged V6	308
14	GTC	**88**	**(Slovakia) ARC Bratislava**	**(Slovakia) Miro Konopka (Poland) Andrzej Lewandowski (Slovakia) Zdeno Mikulasko**	**Lamborghini Huracán Super Trofeo**	**303**
14	GTC	**88**	**(Slovakia) ARC Bratislava**	**(Slovakia) Miro Konopka (Poland) Andrzej Lewandowski (Slovakia) Zdeno Mikulasko**	**5.2 L Lamborghini V10**	**303**
15	GT4	**41**	**(United States) PF Racing**	**(United States) Jade Buford (United States) Chad McCumbee (United States) James Pesek**	**Ford Mustang GT4**	**296**
15	GT4	**41**	**(United States) PF Racing**	**(United States) Jade Buford (United States) Chad McCumbee (United States) James Pesek**	**5.2 L Ford Voodoo V8**	**296**
16	GT4	113	(United States) RHC Jorgensen/Strom by Strom Motorsport	(United States) Daren Jorgensen (United States) Jonathan Miller (United States) Brett Strom	BMW M4 GT4	289
16	GT4	113	(United States) RHC Jorgensen/Strom by Strom Motorsport	(United States) Daren Jorgensen (United States) Jonathan Miller (United States) Brett Strom	3.0 L BMW N55 twin-turbo I6	289
17	GT4	67	(United States) TRG	(United States) Jason Alexandridis (United States) Chris Bellomo (United States) Spencer Pumpelly	Porsche Cayman GT4 Clubsport MR	289
17	GT4	67	(United States) TRG	(United States) Jason Alexandridis (United States) Chris Bellomo (United States) Spencer Pumpelly	3.8 L Porsche H6	289
DNF	GT3	912	(United States) Wright Motorsports	(Australia) Matt Campbell (Norway) Dennis Olsen (Germany) Dirk Werner	Porsche 911 GT3 R	168
DNF	GT3	912	(United States) Wright Motorsports	(Australia) Matt Campbell (Norway) Dennis Olsen (Germany) Dirk Werner	4.0 L Porsche H6	168
DNF	GT3	44	(United Kingdom) Strakka Racing	(United Kingdom) Gary Paffett (France) Tristan Vautier (United Kingdom) Lewis Williamson	Mercedes-AMG GT3	148
DNF	GT3	44	(United Kingdom) Strakka Racing	(United Kingdom) Gary Paffett (France) Tristan Vautier (United Kingdom) Lewis Williamson	6.2 L Mercedes-Benz M159 V8	148
DNF	GT3	107	(United Kingdom) Bentley Team M-Sport	(France) Jules Gounon (United Kingdom) Steven Kane (South Africa) Jordan Pepper	Bentley Continental GT3 (2018)	137
DNF	GT3	107	(United Kingdom) Bentley Team M-Sport	(France) Jules Gounon (United Kingdom) Steven Kane (South Africa) Jordan Pepper	4.0 L Volkswagen twin-turbo V8	137

Icon	Class
**GT3**	GT3
**GTC**	GT Cup
**GT4**	GT4

== Statistics ==
- Race time of winning car: 8:01:11.484
- Race distance of cars on the leaders lap: 731.826 mi (1,177.760 km)
- Fastest race lap: 1:24.287 – Alex Buncombe on lap 5

Intercontinental GT Challenge
Previous race: Bathurst 12 Hour	2019 season	Next race: 24 Hours of Spa
