= 2019 Suzuka 10 Hours =

Endurance event held in Suzuka City

Layout of the Suzuka Circuit

The 2019 Suzuka 10 Hours was an endurance event that took place on August 25, 2019, at the Suzuka Circuit in Suzuka City, Japan. It was the 48th edition of the Summer Endurance Classic at Suzuka, and the third round of the 2019 Intercontinental GT Challenge.

Due to the effects of the COVID-19 pandemic, this was the last Suzuka Summer Endurance Race to take place for five years, until the 2025 Suzuka 1000 km.

== Entry list ==
Icon	Class
P	Pro Cup
S	Silver Cup
PA	Pro-Am Cup
Am	Am Cup
^{A}	Cars eligible for Asia awards
^{SGT}	Cars eligible for Super GT awards

Team	Vehicle	No	Driver	Class
(Japan) Mercedes-AMG Team GOOD SMILE	Mercedes-AMG GT3	00	(Japan) Kamui Kobayashi	P^{A} ^{SGT}
(Japan) Mercedes-AMG Team GOOD SMILE	Mercedes-AMG GT3	00	(Japan) Nobuteru Taniguchi	P^{A} ^{SGT}
(Japan) Mercedes-AMG Team GOOD SMILE	Mercedes-AMG GT3	00	(Japan) Tatsuya Kataoka	P^{A} ^{SGT}
(Hong Kong) KCMG	Nissan GT-R Nismo GT3 (2018)	018	(Switzerland) Alexandre Imperatori	P
(Hong Kong) KCMG	Nissan GT-R Nismo GT3 (2018)	018	(United Kingdom) Oliver Jarvis	P
(Hong Kong) KCMG	Nissan GT-R Nismo GT3 (2018)	018	(Italy) Edoardo Liberati	P
(Hong Kong) KCMG	Nissan GT-R Nismo GT3 (2018)	35	(Australia) Josh Burdon	P^{A}
(Hong Kong) KCMG	Nissan GT-R Nismo GT3 (2018)	35	(Japan) Katsumasa Chiyo	P^{A}
(Hong Kong) KCMG	Nissan GT-R Nismo GT3 (2018)	35	(Japan) Tsugio Matsuda	P^{A}
(Japan) Modulo Drago Corse	Honda NSX GT3	034	(Japan) Ryo Michigami	P^{A} ^{SGT}
(Japan) Modulo Drago Corse	Honda NSX GT3	034	(Japan) Daisuke Nakajima	P^{A} ^{SGT}
(Japan) Modulo Drago Corse	Honda NSX GT3	034	(Japan) Hiroki Otsu	P^{A} ^{SGT}
(Japan) Cars Tokai Dream28	Lotus Evora MC GT300	2	(Japan) Hiroshi Hamaguchi	PA^{A} ^{SGT}
(Japan) Cars Tokai Dream28	Lotus Evora MC GT300	2	(Japan) Hiroki Katoh	PA^{A} ^{SGT}
(Japan) Cars Tokai Dream28	Lotus Evora MC GT300	2	(Japan) Kazuho Takahashi	PA^{A} ^{SGT}
(Japan) GTNET Motor Sports	Nissan GT-R Nismo GT3 (2015)	5	(Japan) Teruhiko Hamano	PA^{A}
(Japan) GTNET Motor Sports	Nissan GT-R Nismo GT3 (2015)	5	(Japan) Kazuki Hoshino	PA^{A}
(Japan) GTNET Motor Sports	Nissan GT-R Nismo GT3 (2015)	5	(Japan) Eiji Yamada	PA^{A}
(Australia) Wall Racing	Lamborghini Huracán GT3 (2017)	6	(Australia) Tony D'Alberto	S
(Australia) Wall Racing	Lamborghini Huracán GT3 (2017)	6	(Australia) Adrian Dietz	S
(Australia) Wall Racing	Lamborghini Huracán GT3 (2017)	6	(Australia) Cameron McConville	S
(Japan) apr with ARN Racing	Ferrari 488 GT3	8	(Japan) Yuta Kamimura	S^{A} ^{SGT}
(Japan) apr with ARN Racing	Ferrari 488 GT3	8	(Japan) Hiroaki Nagai	S^{A} ^{SGT}
(Japan) apr with ARN Racing	Ferrari 488 GT3	8	(Japan) Manabu Orido	S^{A} ^{SGT}
(Japan) MP Racing	Nissan GT-R Nismo GT3 (2015)	9	(Japan) Yusaku Shibata	Am^{A}
(Japan) MP Racing	Nissan GT-R Nismo GT3 (2015)	9	(Japan) Joe Shindo	Am^{A}
(Japan) MP Racing	Nissan GT-R Nismo GT3 (2015)	9	(Japan) Takumi Takata	Am^{A}
(Japan) Planex SmaCam Racing	McLaren 720S GT3	11	(Finland) Mika Häkkinen	P^{A} ^{SGT}
(Japan) Planex SmaCam Racing	McLaren 720S GT3	11	(Japan) Hiroaki Ishiura	P^{A} ^{SGT}
(Japan) Planex SmaCam Racing	McLaren 720S GT3	11	(Japan) Katsuaki Kubota	P^{A} ^{SGT}
(Japan) Team UpGarage	Honda NSX GT3 Evo	18	(Japan) Takashi Kobayashi	P^{A} ^{SGT}
(Japan) Team UpGarage	Honda NSX GT3 Evo	18	(Japan) Tadasuke Makino	P^{A} ^{SGT}
(Japan) Team UpGarage	Honda NSX GT3 Evo	18	(Japan) Kosuke Matsuura	P^{A} ^{SGT}
(Japan) Audi Team Hitotsuyama	Audi R8 LMS Evo	21	(United Kingdom) Richard Lyons	P^{SGT}
(Japan) Audi Team Hitotsuyama	Audi R8 LMS Evo	21	(Belgium) Alessio Picariello	P^{SGT}
(Japan) Audi Team Hitotsuyama	Audi R8 LMS Evo	21	(Japan) Ryuichiro Tomita	P^{SGT}
(Belgium) Audi Sport Team WRT	Audi R8 LMS Evo	25	(South Africa) Kelvin van der Linde	P
(Belgium) Audi Sport Team WRT	Audi R8 LMS Evo	25	(Belgium) Dries Vanthoor	P
(Belgium) Audi Sport Team WRT	Audi R8 LMS Evo	25	(Belgium) Frédéric Vervisch	P
(Chinese Taipei) HubAuto Corsa	Ferrari 488 GT3	27	(New Zealand) Nick Cassidy	P
(Chinese Taipei) HubAuto Corsa	Ferrari 488 GT3	27	(Australia) Nick Foster	P
(Chinese Taipei) HubAuto Corsa	Ferrari 488 GT3	27	(Finland) Heikki Kovalainen	P
(Italy) Motul Honda Team JAS	Honda NSX GT3 Evo	30	(Belgium) Bertrand Baguette	P
(Italy) Motul Honda Team JAS	Honda NSX GT3 Evo	30	(Italy) Marco Bonanomi	P
(Italy) Motul Honda Team JAS	Honda NSX GT3 Evo	30	(Japan) Hideki Mutoh	P
(Germany) Walkenhorst Motorsport	BMW M6 GT3	34	(Netherlands) Nick Catsburg	P
(Germany) Walkenhorst Motorsport	BMW M6 GT3	34	(Denmark) Mikkel Jensen	P
(Germany) Walkenhorst Motorsport	BMW M6 GT3	34	(Norway) Christian Krognes	P
(Germany) Callaway Competition with Bingo Racing	Callaway Corvette C7 GT3-R	37	(Japan) Ryo Ogawa	S^{A}
(Germany) Callaway Competition with Bingo Racing	Callaway Corvette C7 GT3-R	37	(Germany) Markus Pommer	S^{A}
(Germany) Callaway Competition with Bingo Racing	Callaway Corvette C7 GT3-R	37	(Japan) Shinji Takei	S^{A}
(Germany) BMW Team Schnitzer	BMW M6 GT3	42	(Brazil) Augusto Farfus	P
(Germany) BMW Team Schnitzer	BMW M6 GT3	42	(United Kingdom) Nick Yelloly	P
(Germany) BMW Team Schnitzer	BMW M6 GT3	42	(Germany) Martin Tomczyk	P
(United Kingdom) Strakka Racing	Mercedes-AMG GT3	43	(Austria) Dominik Baumann	PA
(United Kingdom) Strakka Racing	Mercedes-AMG GT3	43	(Malaysia) Adrian Henry D'Silva	PA
(United Kingdom) Strakka Racing	Mercedes-AMG GT3	43	(Denmark) Christina Nielsen	PA
(United Kingdom) Mercedes-AMG Team Strakka Racing	Mercedes-AMG GT3	44	(United Kingdom) Gary Paffett	P
(United Kingdom) Mercedes-AMG Team Strakka Racing	Mercedes-AMG GT3	44	(France) Tristan Vautier	P
(United Kingdom) Mercedes-AMG Team Strakka Racing	Mercedes-AMG GT3	44	(United Kingdom) Lewis Williamson	P
(Australia) AMAC Motorsport	Porsche 997 GT3 R	51	(Australia) Andrew MacPherson	S
(Australia) AMAC Motorsport	Porsche 997 GT3 R	51	(Australia) Ben Porter	S
(Australia) AMAC Motorsport	Porsche 997 GT3 R	51	(Australia) Brad Shiels	S
(Japan) LM corsa	Porsche 911 GT3 R	60	(Japan) Kei Nakanishi	PA^{A} ^{SGT}
(Japan) LM corsa	Porsche 911 GT3 R	60	(Japan) Juichi Wakisaka	PA^{A} ^{SGT}
(Japan) LM corsa	Porsche 911 GT3 R	60	(Japan) Shigekazu Wakisaka	PA^{A} ^{SGT}
(Australia) SunEnergy1 Racing	Mercedes-AMG GT3	75	(Germany) Nico Bastian	S
(Australia) SunEnergy1 Racing	Mercedes-AMG GT3	75	(Australia) Kenny Habul	S
(Australia) SunEnergy1 Racing	Mercedes-AMG GT3	75	(Canada) Mikaël Grenier	S
(Hong Kong) Mercedes-AMG Team Craft-Bamboo	Mercedes-AMG GT3	77	(Netherlands) Yelmer Buurman	P
(Hong Kong) Mercedes-AMG Team Craft-Bamboo	Mercedes-AMG GT3	77	(Germany) Maximilian Götz	P
(Hong Kong) Mercedes-AMG Team Craft-Bamboo	Mercedes-AMG GT3	77	(Germany) Luca Stolz	P
(Japan) JLOC	Lamborghini Huracán GT3 Evo	87	(Japan) Takashi Kogure	P^{A} ^{SGT}
(Japan) JLOC	Lamborghini Huracán GT3 Evo	87	(Japan) Yuya Motojima	P^{A} ^{SGT}
(Japan) JLOC	Lamborghini Huracán GT3 Evo	87	(Japan) Yuhi Sekiguchi	P^{A} ^{SGT}
(Japan) JLOC	Lamborghini Huracán GT3 Evo	88	(Italy) Andrea Caldarelli	P^{SGT}
(Japan) JLOC	Lamborghini Huracán GT3 Evo	88	(Denmark) Dennis Lind	P^{SGT}
(Japan) JLOC	Lamborghini Huracán GT3 Evo	88	(Italy) Marco Mapelli	P^{SGT}
(Malaysia) Arrows Racing	Honda NSX GT3 Evo	98	(Macau) Lic Ka Liu	Am^{A}
(Malaysia) Arrows Racing	Honda NSX GT3 Evo	98	(Hong Kong) Philip Ma	Am^{A}
(Malaysia) Arrows Racing	Honda NSX GT3 Evo	98	(Hong Kong) Jacky Yeung	Am^{A}
(United Kingdom) Bentley Team M-Sport	Bentley Continental GT3	107	(France) Jules Gounon	P
(United Kingdom) Bentley Team M-Sport	Bentley Continental GT3	107	(United Kingdom) Steven Kane	P
(United Kingdom) Bentley Team M-Sport	Bentley Continental GT3	107	(South Africa) Jordan Pepper	P
(United Kingdom) Bentley Team M-Sport	Bentley Continental GT3	108	(United Kingdom) Alex Buncombe	P
(United Kingdom) Bentley Team M-Sport	Bentley Continental GT3	108	(Spain) Andy Soucek	P
(United Kingdom) Bentley Team M-Sport	Bentley Continental GT3	108	(United Kingdom) Seb Morris	P
(Japan) Sato-SS Sports	Mercedes-AMG GT3	112	(Japan) Norio Kubo	Am^{A}
(Japan) Sato-SS Sports	Mercedes-AMG GT3	112	(Japan) Atsushi Sato	Am^{A}
(Japan) Sato-SS Sports	Mercedes-AMG GT3	112	(Japan) Ryosei Yamashita	Am^{A}
(China) / Audi Sport Team Absolute Racing (Note: Car No. 125 entered as Audi Sport Team Absolute Racing and car No. 912 entered as Absolute Racing.); (China) / Absolute Racing	Audi R8 LMS Evo	125	(Germany) Christopher Haase	P
(China) / Audi Sport Team Absolute Racing; (China) / Absolute Racing	Audi R8 LMS Evo	125	(Germany) Christopher Mies	P
(China) / Audi Sport Team Absolute Racing; (China) / Absolute Racing	Audi R8 LMS Evo	125	(Germany) Markus Winkelhock	P
(China) / Audi Sport Team Absolute Racing; (China) / Absolute Racing	Porsche 911 GT3 R	912	(Australia) Matt Campbell	P
(China) / Audi Sport Team Absolute Racing; (China) / Absolute Racing	Porsche 911 GT3 R	912	(Norway) Dennis Olsen	P
(China) / Audi Sport Team Absolute Racing; (China) / Absolute Racing	Porsche 911 GT3 R	912	(Germany) Dirk Werner	P
(United Kingdom) Garage 59	Aston Martin Vantage AMR GT3	188	(United Kingdom) Chris Goodwin	PA
(United Kingdom) Garage 59	Aston Martin Vantage AMR GT3	188	(France) Côme Ledogar	PA
(United Kingdom) Garage 59	Aston Martin Vantage AMR GT3	188	(Sweden) Alexander West	PA
(Japan) CarGuy Racing	Ferrari 488 GT3	777	(Spain) Miguel Molina	P
(Japan) CarGuy Racing	Ferrari 488 GT3	777	(Japan) Kei Cozzolino	P
(Japan) CarGuy Racing	Ferrari 488 GT3	777	(United Kingdom) James Calado	P
(New Zealand) EBM	Porsche 911 GT3 R	911	(France) Romain Dumas	P
(New Zealand) EBM	Porsche 911 GT3 R	911	(France) Mathieu Jaminet	P
(New Zealand) EBM	Porsche 911 GT3 R	911	(Germany) Sven Müller	P
(Hong Kong) Mercedes-AMG Team GruppeM Racing	Mercedes-AMG GT3	999	(Germany) Maximilian Buhk	P
(Hong Kong) Mercedes-AMG Team GruppeM Racing	Mercedes-AMG GT3	999	(Germany) Maro Engel	P
(Hong Kong) Mercedes-AMG Team GruppeM Racing	Mercedes-AMG GT3	999	(Italy) Raffaele Marciello	P

== Qualifying ==
=== Super Pole ===
These were the 20 fastest cars in qualifying

Pos	N°	Driver	Team	Car	Time	Dif
1	42	(Brazil) Augusto Farfus	BMW Team Schnitzer	BMW M6 GT3	2:00.455	
2	25	(Belgium) Dries Vanthoor	Audi Sport Team WRT	Audi R8 LMS Evo	2:00.531	+0,076
3	34	(Netherlands) Nick Catsburg	Walkenhorst Motorsport	BMW M6 GT3	2:00.729	+0,274
4	777	(Spain) Miguel Molina	CarGuy Racing	Ferrari 488 GT3	2:00.868	+0,413
5	107	(France) Jules Gounon	Bentley Team M-Sport	Bentley Continental GT3	2:01.002	+0,547
6	00	(Japan) Kamui Kobayashi	Mercedes-AMG Team GOOD SMILE	Mercedes-AMG GT3	2:01.024	+0,569
7	125	(Germany) Christopher Haase	Audi Sport Team Absolute Racing	Audi R8 LMS Evo	2:01.045	+0,590
8	77	(Germany) Maximilian Götz	Mercedes-AMG Team Craft Bamboo	Mercedes-AMG GT3	2:01.071	+0,616
9	999	(Germany) Maro Engel	Mercedes-AMG Team GruppeM Racing	Mercedes-AMG GT3	2:01.177	+0,722
10	107	(Spain) Andy Soucek	Bentley Team M-Soort	Bentley Continental GT3	2:01.292	+0,837
11	912	(Germany) Dirk Werner	Absolute Racing	Porsche 911 GT3 R	2:01.306	+0,851
12	75	(Germany) Nico Bastian	SunEnergy1 Racing	Mercedes-AMG GT3	2:01.348	+0,893
13	35	(Japan) Tsugio Matsuda	KCMG	Nissan GT-R Nismo GT3 (2018)	2:01.448	+0,998
14	44	(United Kingdom) Gary Paffett	Mercedes-AMG Team Strakka Racing	Mercedes-AMG GT3	2:01.479	+1,024
15	30	(Belgium) Bertrand Baguette	Honda Team Motul	Honda NSX GT3	2:01.525	+1,070
16	88	(Italy) Marco Mapelli	JLOC	Lamborghini Huracán GT3 Evo	2:01.537	+1,082
17	018	(United Kingdom) Oliver Jarvis	KCMG	Nissan GT-R Nismo GT3 (2018)	2:01.563	+1,108
18	21	(United Kingdom) Richard Lyons	Audi Team Hitotsuyama	Audi R8 LMS Evo	2:01.579	+1,124
19	87	(Japan) Takashi Kogure	JLOC	Lamborghini Huracán GT3 Evo	2:01.614	+1,158
20	27	(Finland) Heikki Kovalainen	HubAuto Corsa	Ferrari 488 GT3	2:01.727	+1,272

== Race ==
=== Race results ===
Pos	Class	No	Team	Drivers	Car	Laps	Time/Reason
1	P	25	(Belgium) Audi Sport Team WRT	(South Africa) Kelvin van der Linde (Belgium) Dries Vanthoor (Belgium) Frédéric Vervisch	Audi R8 LMS Evo	275	10:01:51.048
2	P	999	(Hong Kong) Mercedes-AMG Team GruppeM Racing	(Germany) Maximilian Buhk (Germany) Maro Engel (Italy) Raffaele Marciello	Mercedes-AMG GT3	275	+40.367
3	P	912	(China) Absolute Racing	(Australia) Matt Campbell (Norway) Dennis Olsen (Germany) Dirk Werner	Porsche 911 GT3 R	275	+43.797
4	P	77	(Hong Kong) Mercedes-AMG Team Craft-Bamboo	(Netherlands) Yelmer Buurman (Germany) Maximilian Götz (Germany) Luca Stolz	Mercedes-AMG GT3	275	+47.038
5	P	42	(Germany) BMW Team Schnitzer	(Brazil) Augusto Farfus (United Kingdom) Nick Yelloly (Germany) Martin Tomczyk	BMW M6 GT3	275	+48.666
6	P	35	(Hong Kong) KCMG	(Australia) Josh Burdon (Japan) Katsumasa Chiyo (Japan) Tsugio Matsuda	Nissan GT-R NISMO GT3 (2018)	275	+56.921
7	P	125	(China) Audi Sport Team Absolute Racing	(Germany) Christopher Haase (Germany) Christopher Mies (Germany) Markus Winkelhock	Audi R8 LMS Evo	275	+57.199
8	P	107	(United Kingdom) Bentley Team M-Sport	(France) Jules Gounon (United Kingdom) Steven Kane (South Africa) Jordan Pepper	Bentley Continental GT3	275	+1:11.098
9	P	44	(United Kingdom) Mercedes-AMG Team Strakka Racing	(United Kingdom) Gary Paffett (France) Tristan Vautier (United Kingdom) Lewis Williamson	Mercedes-AMG GT3	275	+1:27.891
10	P	00	(Japan) Mercedes-AMG Team GOOD SMILE	(Japan) Kamui Kobayashi (Japan) Nobuteru Taniguchi (Japan) Tatsuya Kataoka	Mercedes-AMG GT3	274	+1 Lap
11	P	777	(Japan) CarGuy Racing	(Spain) Miguel Molina (Japan) Kei Cozzolino (United Kingdom) James Calado	Ferrari 488 GT3	274	+1 Lap
12	S	75	(Australia) SunEnergy1 Racing	(Germany) Nico Bastian (Australia) Kenny Habul (Canada) Mikaël Grenier	Mercedes-AMG GT3	274	+1 Lap
13	P	911	(New Zealand) EBM	(France) Romain Dumas (France) Mathieu Jaminet (Germany) Sven Müller	Porsche 911 GT3 R	273	+2 Laps
14	P	18	(Japan) Team UpGarage	(Japan) Takashi Kobayashi (Japan) Tadasuke Makino (Japan) Kosuke Matsuura	Honda NSX GT3 Evo	273	+2 Laps
15	P	30	(Italy) Honda Team Motul	(Belgium) Bertrand Baguette (Italy) Marco Bonanomi (Japan) Hideki Mutoh	Honda NSX GT3 Evo	273	+2 Laps
16	P	87	(Japan) JLOC	(Japan) Takashi Kogure (Japan) Yuya Motojima (Japan) Yuhi Sekiguchi	Lamborghini Huracán GT3 Evo	272	+3 Laps
17	P	21	(Japan) Audi Team Hitotsuyama	(United Kingdom) Richard Lyons (Belgium) Alessio Picariello (Japan) Ryuichiro Tomita	Audi R8 LMS Evo	272	+3 Laps
18	P	034	(Japan) Modulo Drago Corse	(Japan) Ryo Michigami (Japan) Daisuke Nakajima (Japan) Hiroki Otsu	Honda NSX GT3 Evo	272	+3 Laps
19	S	37	(Germany) Callaway Competition with Bingo Racing	(Japan) Ryo Ogawa (Germany) Markus Pommer (Japan) Shinji Takei	Callaway Corvette C7 GT3-R	271	+4 Laps
20	PA	43	(United Kingdom) Strakka Racing	(Austria) Dominik Baumann (Malaysia) Adrian Henry D'Silva (Denmark) Christina Nielsen	Mercedes-AMG GT3	269	+6 Laps
21	PA	188	(United Kingdom) Garage 59	(United Kingdom) Chris Goodwin (France) Côme Ledogar (Sweden) Alexander West	Aston Martin AMR Vantage GT3	269	+6 Laps
22	P	11	(Japan) Planex SmaCam Racing	(Finland) Mika Häkkinen (Japan) Hiroaki Ishiura (Japan) Katsuaki Kubota	McLaren 720S GT3	268	+7 Laps
23	P	018	(Hong Kong) KCMG	(Switzerland) Alexandre Imperatori (United Kingdom) Oliver Jarvis (Italy) Edoardo Liberati	Nissan GT-R NISMO GT3 (2018)	266	+9 Laps
24	PA	60	(Japan) LM corsa	(Japan) Kei Nakanishi (Japan) Juichi Wakisaka (Japan) Shigekazu Wakisaka	Porsche 911 GT3 R	263	+12 Laps
25	Am	112	(Japan) Sato-SS Sports	(Japan) Norio Kubo (Japan) Atsushi Sato (Japan) Ryosei Yamashita	Mercedes-AMG GT3	263	+12 Laps
26	Am	9	(Japan) MP Racing	(Japan) Yusaku Shibata (Japan) Joe Shindo (Japan) Takumi Takata	Nissan GT-R NISMO GT3 (2015)	261	+14 Laps
27	PA	2	(Japan) Cars Tokai Dream28	(Japan) Hiroshi Hamaguchi (Japan) Hiroki Katoh (Japan) Kazuho Takahashi	Lotus Evora MC	260	+15 Laps
28	P	108	(United Kingdom) Bentley Team M-Sport	(United Kingdom) Alex Buncombe (Spain) Andy Soucek (United Kingdom) Seb Morris	Bentley Continental GT3	259	+16 Laps
29	PA	5	(Japan) GTNET Motor Sports	(Japan) Teruhiko Hamano (Japan) Kazuki Hoshino (Japan) Eiji Yamada	Nissan GT-R NISMO GT3 (2015)	245	+30 Laps
30	S	6	(Australia) Wall Racing	(Australia) Tony D'Alberto (Australia) Adrian Dietz (Australia) Cameron McConville	Lamborghini Huracán GT3	244	+31 Laps
31	S	51	(Australia) AMAC Motorsport	(Australia) Andrew MacPherson (Australia) Ben Porter (Australia) Brad Shiels	Porsche 997 GT3 R	227	+48 Laps
32	P	27	(Chinese Taipei) HubAuto Corsa	(New Zealand) Nick Cassidy (Australia) Nick Foster (Finland) Heikki Kovalainen	Ferrari 488 GT3	197	+78 Laps
NC	S	8	(Japan) apr with ARN Racing	(Japan) Yuta Kamimura (Japan) Hiroaki Nagai (Japan) Manabu Orido	Ferrari 488 GT3	186	
NC	Am	98	(Malaysia) Arrows Racing	(Macau) Lic Ka Liu (Hong Kong) Philip Ma (Hong Kong) Jacky Yeung	Honda NSX GT3 Evo	59	
NC	P	88	(Japan) JLOC	(Italy) Andrea Caldarelli (Denmark) Dennis Lind (Switzerland) Marco Mapelli	Lamborghini Huracán GT3 Evo	49	
NC	P	34	(Germany) Walkenhorst Motorsport	(Netherlands) Nick Catsburg (Denmark) Mikkel Jensen (Norway) Christian Krognes	BMW M6 GT3	43	

== Notes ==
Intercontinental GT Challenge
Previous race: 24 Hours of Spa	2019 season	Next race: Kyalami 9 Hours
