= 2019 Kyalami 9 Hours =

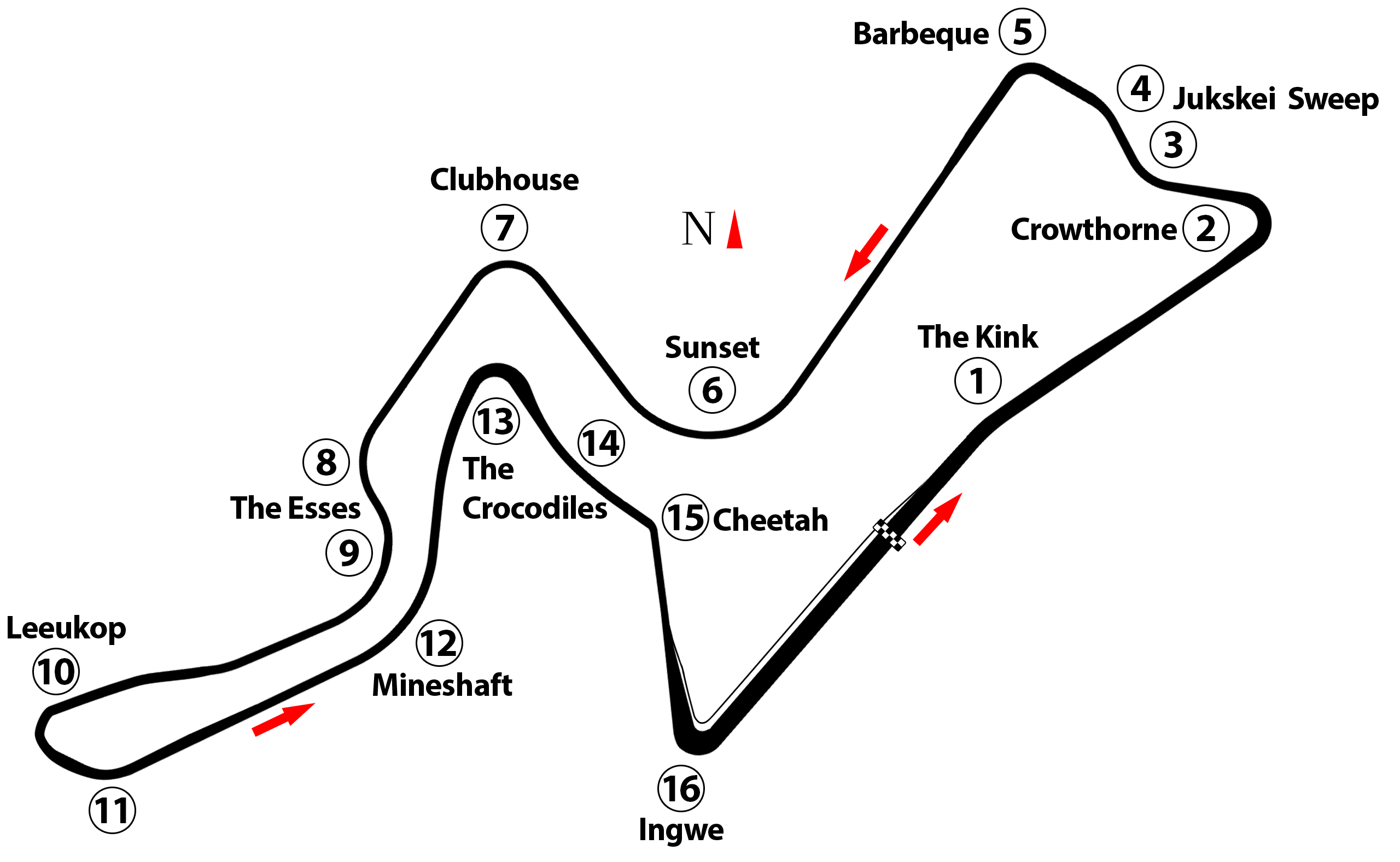
Layout of the Kyalami

The 2019 Kyalami 9 Hours was an endurance event that took place on 23 November 2019 at the Kyalami Grand Prix Circuit in Midrand, South Africa. This event served as a revival to the Kyalami 9 Hours event which was last held in 2000, and also served as the final round of the 2019 Intercontinental GT Challenge.

The race was won from pole by Frikadelli Racing Team and drivers Nick Tandy, Dennis Olsen and Mathieu Jaminet. Frikadelli's #31 Porsche 911 GT3 R finished 6.745 seconds ahead of Walkenhorst Motorsport and their #34 BMW M6 GT3 shared by Mikkel Jensen, Nicky Catsburg and Christian Krognes. GPX Racing secured third place a further 2.290 seconds down, in their #20 Porsche 911 GT3 R driven by Kevin Estre, Richard Lietz and Michael Christensen.

== Entry list ==
| Team | Vehicle | No | Driver | Class |
|---|---|---|---|---|
| (South Africa) Team Perfect Circle | Porsche 997 GT3 R | 09 | (South Africa) Andre Bezuidenhout | Nat |
| (South Africa) Team Perfect Circle | Porsche 997 GT3 R | 09 | (South Africa) Franco Scribante | Nat |
| (South Africa) Team Perfect Circle | Porsche 997 GT3 R | 09 | (South Africa) Silvio Scribante | Nat |
| (Germany) Mercedes-AMG Team Black Falcon | Mercedes-AMG GT3 | 6 | (Russia) Sergei Afanasiev | S |
| (Germany) Mercedes-AMG Team Black Falcon | Mercedes-AMG GT3 | 6 | (Germany) Patrick Assenheimer | S |
| (Germany) Mercedes-AMG Team Black Falcon | Mercedes-AMG GT3 | 6 | (Germany) Hubert Haupt | S |
| (Austria) Lechner Racing | Porsche 911 GT3 R | 9 | (South Africa) Saul Hack | S |
| (Austria) Lechner Racing | Porsche 911 GT3 R | 9 | (Germany) Lars Kern | S |
| (Austria) Lechner Racing | Porsche 911 GT3 R | 9 | (Luxembourg) Dylan Pereira | S |
| (Germany) Mercedes-AMG Team SPS Automotive Performance | Mercedes-AMG GT3 | 10 | (Netherlands) Yelmer Buurman | P |
| (Germany) Mercedes-AMG Team SPS Automotive Performance | Mercedes-AMG GT3 | 10 | (Germany) Maximilian Götz | P |
| (Germany) Mercedes-AMG Team SPS Automotive Performance | Mercedes-AMG GT3 | 10 | (Germany) Luca Stolz | P |
| (Germany) Mercedes-AMG Team SPS Automotive Performance | Mercedes-AMG GT3 | 40 | (Germany) Tim Müller | Am |
| (Germany) Mercedes-AMG Team SPS Automotive Performance | Mercedes-AMG GT3 | 40 | (Germany) Valentin Pierburg | Am |
| (Germany) Mercedes-AMG Team SPS Automotive Performance | Mercedes-AMG GT3 | 40 | (Portugal) Miguel Ramos | Am |
| (Italy) Dinamic Motorsport | Porsche 911 GT3 R | 12 | (New Zealand) Earl Bamber | P |
| (Italy) Dinamic Motorsport | Porsche 911 GT3 R | 12 | (Australia) Matt Campbell | P |
| (Italy) Dinamic Motorsport | Porsche 911 GT3 R | 12 | (Belgium) Laurens Vanthoor | P |
| (South Africa) Stradale Motorsport | Lamborghini Huracán GT3 | 13 | (South Africa) Charl Arangies | Nat |
| (South Africa) Stradale Motorsport | Lamborghini Huracán GT3 | 13 | (South Africa) Craig Jarvis | Nat |
| (South Africa) Stradale Motorsport | Lamborghini Huracán GT3 | 13 | (South Africa) Dawie Joubert | Nat |
| (South Africa) Pablo Clark Racing | Ferrari 458 Italia GT3 | 17 | (South Africa) Kishoor Pitamber | Nat |
| (South Africa) Pablo Clark Racing | Ferrari 458 Italia GT3 | 17 | (South Africa) Michael Stephen | Nat |
| (South Africa) Pablo Clark Racing | Ferrari 458 Italia GT3 | 17 | (South Africa) Leonard Charles Thompson | Nat |
| (Hong Kong) KCMG | Nissan GT-R Nismo GT3 | 18 | (Switzerland) Alexandre Imperatori | P |
| (Hong Kong) KCMG | Nissan GT-R Nismo GT3 | 18 | (United Kingdom) Oliver Jarvis | P |
| (Hong Kong) KCMG | Nissan GT-R Nismo GT3 | 18 | (Italy) Edoardo Liberati | P |
| (Hong Kong) KCMG | Nissan GT-R Nismo GT3 | 35 | (Australia) Josh Burdon | P |
| (Hong Kong) KCMG | Nissan GT-R Nismo GT3 | 35 | (Japan) Katsumasa Chiyo | P |
| (Hong Kong) KCMG | Nissan GT-R Nismo GT3 | 35 | (Brazil) João Paulo de Oliveira | P |
| (United Arab Emirates) GPX Racing | Porsche 911 GT3 R | 20 | (Denmark) Michael Christensen | P |
| (United Arab Emirates) GPX Racing | Porsche 911 GT3 R | 20 | (France) Kévin Estre | P |
| (United Arab Emirates) GPX Racing | Porsche 911 GT3 R | 20 | (Austria) Richard Lietz | P |
| (Germany) Rinaldi Racing | Ferrari 488 GT3 | 22 | (Germany) Jochen Krumbach | S |
| (Germany) Rinaldi Racing | Ferrari 488 GT3 | 22 | (South Africa) David Perel | S |
| (Germany) Rinaldi Racing | Ferrari 488 GT3 | 22 | (Germany) Leonard Weiss | S |
| (Belgium) Audi Sport Team WRT | Audi R8 LMS | 25 | (South Africa) Kelvin van der Linde | P |
| (Belgium) Audi Sport Team WRT | Audi R8 LMS | 25 | (Belgium) Dries Vanthoor | P |
| (Belgium) Audi Sport Team WRT | Audi R8 LMS | 25 | (Belgium) Frédéric Vervisch | P |
| (Germany) Audi Sport Team Land | Audi R8 LMS | 29 | (Germany) Christopher Haase | P |
| (Germany) Audi Sport Team Land | Audi R8 LMS | 29 | (Germany) Christopher Mies | P |
| (Germany) Audi Sport Team Land | Audi R8 LMS | 29 | (Germany) Markus Winkelhock | P |
| (Italy) Honda Team Motul | Honda NSX GT3 | 30 | (Belgium) Bertrand Baguette | P |
| (Italy) Honda Team Motul | Honda NSX GT3 | 30 | (Italy) Marco Bonanomi | P |
| (Italy) Honda Team Motul | Honda NSX GT3 | 30 | (United States) Dane Cameron | P |
| (Germany) Frikadelli Racing Team | Porsche 911 GT3 R | 31 | (France) Mathieu Jaminet | P |
| (Germany) Frikadelli Racing Team | Porsche 911 GT3 R | 31 | (Norway) Dennis Olsen | P |
| (Germany) Frikadelli Racing Team | Porsche 911 GT3 R | 31 | (United Kingdom) Nick Tandy | P |
| (Germany) Walkenhorst Motorsport | BMW M6 GT3 | 34 | (Netherlands) Nicky Catsburg | P |
| (Germany) Walkenhorst Motorsport | BMW M6 GT3 | 34 | (Denmark) Mikkel Jensen | P |
| (Germany) Walkenhorst Motorsport | BMW M6 GT3 | 34 | (Norway) Christian Krognes | P |
| (Germany) Walkenhorst Motorsport | BMW M6 GT3 | 36 | (South Africa) Gennaro Bonafede | Am |
| (Germany) Walkenhorst Motorsport | BMW M6 GT3 | 36 | (South Africa) Michael Von Rooyen | Am |
| (Germany) Walkenhorst Motorsport | BMW M6 GT3 | 36 | (Germany) Henry Walkenhorst | Am |
| (Germany) BMW Team Schnitzer | BMW M6 GT3 | 42 | (Brazil) Augusto Farfus | P |
| (Germany) BMW Team Schnitzer | BMW M6 GT3 | 42 | (South Africa) Sheldon van der Linde | P |
| (Germany) BMW Team Schnitzer | BMW M6 GT3 | 42 | (Germany) Martin Tomczyk | P |
| (United Kingdom) Mercedes-AMG Team Strakka Racing | Mercedes-AMG GT3 | 43 | (Austria) Dominik Baumann | PA |
| (United Kingdom) Mercedes-AMG Team Strakka Racing | Mercedes-AMG GT3 | 43 | (Denmark) Christina Nielsen | PA |
| (United Kingdom) Mercedes-AMG Team Strakka Racing | Mercedes-AMG GT3 | 43 | (Malaysia) Adrian Henry D'Sliva | PA |
| (United Kingdom) Mercedes-AMG Team Strakka Racing | Mercedes-AMG GT3 | 44 | (United Kingdom) Gary Paffett | P |
| (United Kingdom) Mercedes-AMG Team Strakka Racing | Mercedes-AMG GT3 | 44 | (France) Tristan Vautier | P |
| (United Kingdom) Mercedes-AMG Team Strakka Racing | Mercedes-AMG GT3 | 44 | (United Kingdom) Lewis Williamson | P |
| (Switzerland) R-Motorsport | Aston Martin Vantage AMR GT3 | 62 | (United Kingdom) Ricky Collard | P |
| (Switzerland) R-Motorsport | Aston Martin Vantage AMR GT3 | 62 | (Germany) Marvin Kirchhöfer | P |
| (Switzerland) R-Motorsport | Aston Martin Vantage AMR GT3 | 62 | (Switzerland) Hugo de Sadeleer | P |
| (Switzerland) R-Motorsport | Aston Martin Vantage AMR GT3 | 76 | (Pakistan) Enaam Ahmed | P |
| (Switzerland) R-Motorsport | Aston Martin Vantage AMR GT3 | 76 | (United Kingdom) Jake Dennis | P |
| (Switzerland) R-Motorsport | Aston Martin Vantage AMR GT3 | 76 | (Belgium) Maxime Martin | P |
| (United Kingdom) Bentley Team M-Sport | Bentley Continental GT3 | 107 | (France) Jules Gounon | P |
| (United Kingdom) Bentley Team M-Sport | Bentley Continental GT3 | 107 | (South Africa) Jordan Pepper | P |
| (United Kingdom) Bentley Team M-Sport | Bentley Continental GT3 | 107 | (Belgium) Maxime Soulet | P |
| (United Kingdom) Bentley Team M-Sport | Bentley Continental GT3 | 108 | (Brazil) Rodrigo Baptista | P |
| (United Kingdom) Bentley Team M-Sport | Bentley Continental GT3 | 108 | (United Kingdom) Steven Kane | P |
| (United Kingdom) Bentley Team M-Sport | Bentley Continental GT3 | 108 | (Spain) Andy Soucek | P |
| (United Kingdom) Garage 59 | Aston Martin Vantage AMR GT3 | 188 | (United Kingdom) Chris Goodwin | PA |
| (United Kingdom) Garage 59 | Aston Martin Vantage AMR GT3 | 188 | (France) Côme Ledogar | PA |
| (United Kingdom) Garage 59 | Aston Martin Vantage AMR GT3 | 188 | (Sweden) Alexander West | PA |
| (Germany) KÜS Team75 Bernhard | Porsche 911 GT3 R | 911 | (France) Romain Dumas | P |
| (Germany) KÜS Team75 Bernhard | Porsche 911 GT3 R | 911 | (Germany) Sven Müller | P |
| (Germany) KÜS Team75 Bernhard | Porsche 911 GT3 R | 911 | (Germany) Dirk Werner | P |
| (Hong Kong) Mercedes-AMG Team GruppeM Racing | Mercedes-AMG GT3 | 999 | (Germany) Maximilian Buhk | P |
| (Hong Kong) Mercedes-AMG Team GruppeM Racing | Mercedes-AMG GT3 | 999 | (Germany) Maro Engel | P |
| (Hong Kong) Mercedes-AMG Team GruppeM Racing | Mercedes-AMG GT3 | 999 | (Italy) Raffaele Marciello | P |

| Icon | Class |
|---|---|
| P | Pro Cup |
| S | Silver Cup |
| PA | Pro-Am Cup |
| Am | Am Cup |
| Nat | National Cup |

== Qualifying ==
=== Pole Shootout ===
These were the 10 fastest cars in qualifying

| Pos | N° | Driver | Team | Car | Time | Dif |
|---|---|---|---|---|---|---|
| 1 | 31 | (United Kingdom) Nick Tandy | Frikadelli Racing Team | Porsche 911 GT3 R | 1:52.825 | |
| 2 | 29 | (Germany) Christopher Haase | Audi Sport Team Land | Audi R8 LMS Evo | 1:52.870 | +0.045 |
| 3 | 999 | (Italy) Raffaele Marciello | Mercedes-AMG Team GruppeM Racing | Mercedes-AMG GT3 | 1:53.086 | +0.261 |
| 4 | 20 | (Austria) Richard Lietz | GPX Racing | Porsche 911 GT3 R | 1:53.569 | +0.744 |
| 5 | 12 | (Australia) Matt Campbell | Dinamic Motorsport | Porsche 911 GT3 R | 1:53.787 | +0.962 |
| 6 | 42 | (South Africa) Sheldon van der Linde | BMW Team Schnitzer | BMW M6 GT3 | 1:53.833 | +1.008 |
| 7 | 76 | (United Kingdom) Jake Dennis | R-Motorsport | Aston Martin Vantage AMR GT3 | 1:53.942 | +1.117 |
| 8 | 30 | (Belgium) Bertrand Baguette | Honda Team Motul | Honda NSX GT3 | 1:54.034 | +1.209 |
| 9 | 10 | (Germany) Maximilian Götz | Mercedes-AMG Team SPS Automotive Performance | Mercedes-AMG GT3 | 1:54.174 | +1.349 |
| 10 | 35 | (Australia) Josh Burdon | KCMG | Nissan GT-R Nismo GT3 | 1:54.303 | +1.478 |

== Race ==
=== Race results ===
| Pos | Class | No | Team | Drivers | Car | Laps | Time/Reason |
|---|---|---|---|---|---|---|---|
| 1 | P | 31 | (Germany) Frikadelli Racing Team | (United Kingdom) Nick Tandy (Norway) Dennis Olsen (France) Mathieu Jaminet | Porsche 911 GT3 R | 259 | 9:00:06.106 |
| 2 | P | 34 | (Germany) Walkenhorst Motorsport | (Denmark) Mikkel Jensen (Netherlands) Nicky Catsburg (Norway) Christian Krognes | BMW M6 GT3 | 259 | +6.745 |
| 3 | P | 20 | (United Arab Emirates) GPX Racing | (France) Kevin Estre (Austria) Richard Lietz (Denmark) Michael Christensen | Porsche 911 GT3 R | 259 | +9.035 |
| 4 | P | 29 | (Germany) Audi Sport Team Land | (Germany) Christopher Haase (Belgium) Christopher Mies (Germany) Markus Winkelhock | Audi R8 LMS | 259 | +15.325 |
| 5 | P | 10 | (Germany) Mercedes-AMG Team SPS Automotive Performance | (Germany) Maximilian Götz (Netherlands) Yelmer Buurman (Germany) Luca Stolz | Mercedes-AMG GT3 | 259 | +17.162 |
| 6 | P | 18 | (Hong Kong) KCMG | (Italy) Edoardo Liberati (United Kingdom) Oliver Jarvis (Switzerland) Alexandre Imperatori | Nissan GT-R Nismo GT3 | 259 | +30.731 |
| 7 | P | 42 | (Germany) BMW Team Schnitzer | (South Africa) Sheldon van der Linde (Brazil) Augusto Farfus (Germany) Martin Tomczyk | BMW M6 GT3 | 259 | +40.556 |
| 8 | P | 12 | (Italy) Dinamic Motorsport | (Belgium) Laurens Vanthoor (New Zealand) Earl Bamber (Australia) Matt Campbell | Porsche 911 GT3 R | 259 | +41.165^{1} |
| 9 | P | 911 | (Germany) KÜS Team75 Bernhard | (Germany) Sven Müller (France) Romain Dumas (Germany) Dirk Werner | Porsche 911 GT3 R | 259 | +44.188 |
| 10 | P | 62 | (Switzerland) R-Motorsport | (United Kingdom) Ricky Collard (Switzerland) Hugo de Sadeleer (Germany) Marvin Kirchhöfer | Aston Martin Vantage AMR GT3 | 259 | +44.729 |
| 11 | P | 25 | (Belgium) Audi Sport Team WRT | (South Africa) Kelvin van der Linde (Belgium) Frederic Vervisch (Belgium) Dries Vanthoor | Audi R8 LMS | 258 | +1 Lap |
| 12 | P | 107 | (United Kingdom) Bentley Team M-Sport | (South Africa) Jordan Pepper (France) Jules Gounon (Belgium) Maxime Soulet | Bentley Continental GT3 | 258 | +1 Lap |
| 13 | S | 9 | (Austria) Lechner Racing | (South Africa) Saul Hack (Germany) Lars Kern (Luxembourg) Dylan Pereira | Porsche 911 GT3 R | 257 | +2 Laps |
| 14 | P | 76 | (Switzerland) R-Motorsport | (Pakistan) Enaam Ahmed (United Kingdom) Jake Dennis (Belgium) Maxime Martin | Aston Martin Vantage AMR GT3 | 256 | +3 Laps |
| 15 | S | 6 | (Germany) Mercedes-AMG Team Black Falcon | (Germany) Patrick Assenheimer (Russia) Sergei Afanasiev (Germany) Hubert Haupt | Mercedes-AMG GT3 | 256 | +3 Laps |
| 16 | S | 22 | (Germany) Rinaldi Racing | (Germany) Jochen Krumbach (South Africa) David Perel (Germany) Leonard Weiss | Ferrari 488 GT3 | 256 | +3 Laps |
| 17 | Am | 36 | (Germany) Walkenhorst Motorsport | (South Africa) Gennaro Bonafede (South Africa) Michael Von Rooyen (Germany) Henry Walkenhorst | BMW M6 GT3 | 253 | +6 Laps |
| 18 | Am | 40 | (Germany) Mercedes-AMG Team SPS Automotive Performance | (Germany) Tim Müller (Germany) Valentin Pierburg (Portugal) Miguel Ramos | Mercedes-AMG GT3 | 253 | +6 Laps |
| 19 | P | 35 | (Hong Kong) KCMG | (Japan) Katsumasa Chiyo (Brazil) João Paulo de Oliveira (Australia) Josh Burdon | Nissan GT-R Nismo GT3 | 251 | +8 Laps |
| 20 | PA | 43 | (United Kingdom) Mercedes-AMG Team Strakka Racing | (Denmark) Christina Nielsen (Malaysia) Adrian Henry D'Sliva (Austria) Dominik Baumann | Mercedes-AMG GT3 | 251 | +8 Laps |
| 21 | Nat | 17 | (South Africa) Pablo Clark Racing | (South Africa) Leonard Charles Thompson (South Africa) Michael Stephen (South Africa) Kishoor Pitamber | Ferrari 458 Italia GT3 | 246 | +13 Laps |
| 22 | P | 108 | (United Kingdom) Bentley Team M-Sport | (Brazil) Rodrigo Baptista (Spain) Andy Soucek (United Kingdom) Steven Kane | Bentley Continental GT3 | 206 | Accident |
| DNF | PA | 188 | (United Kingdom) Garage 59 | (United Kingdom) Chris Goodwin (France) Côme Ledogar (Sweden) Alexander West | Aston Martin Vantage AMR GT3 | 130 | Mechanical |
| DNF | P | 44 | (United Kingdom) Mercedes-AMG Team Strakka Racing | (United Kingdom) Gary Paffett (United Kingdom) Lewis Williamson (France) Tristan Vautier | Mercedes-AMG GT3 | 98 | Accident |
| DNF | Nat | 09 | (South Africa) Team Perfect Circle | (South Africa) André Bezuidenhout (South Africa) Franco Scribante (South Africa) Silvio Scribante | Porsche 997 GT3 R | 85 | Mechanical |
| DNF | Nat | 13 | (South Africa) Stradale Motorsport | (South Africa) Charl Arangies (South Africa) Craig Jarvis (South Africa) Dawie Joubert | Lamborghini Huracán GT3 | 81 | Accident |
| DNF | P | 30 | (Italy) Honda Team Motul | (United States) Dane Cameron (Belgium) Bertrand Baguette (Italy) Marco Bonanomi | Honda NSX GT3 | 55 | Mechanical |
| DNF | P | 999 | (Hong Kong) Mercedes-AMG Team GruppeM Racing | (Germany) Maximilian Buhk (Italy) Raffaele Marciello (Germany) Maro Engel | Mercedes-AMG GT3 | 0 | Broken Cylinder Coil |

Notes

- ^1 - The #12 Dinamic Motorsport car was awarded a 10-second time penalty after the race.

Intercontinental GT Challenge
| Previous race: Suzuka 10 Hours | 2019 season | Next race: 2020 Bathurst 12 Hour; 2020 season |
