= 2019 Intercontinental GT Challenge =

4th season of sports car racing series

The 2019 Intercontinental GT Challenge was the fourth season of the Intercontinental GT Challenge. The season featured five rounds, starting with the Liqui Moly Bathurst 12 Hour on 3 February and concluding with the Kyalami 9 Hours on 23 November. Tristan Vautier was the defending Drivers' champion and Audi was the defending Manufacturers' champion.

== Calendar ==
At the annual press conference during the 2018 24 Hours of Spa on 27 July, the Stéphane Ratel Organisation announced the first draft of the 2019 calendar. Kyalami was added to the schedule. On 3 December, it was announced the nine-hour race in South Africa would be moved from 3 to 23 November to avoid a clash with the Rugby World Cup. The date of the California 8 Hours was confirmed on 18 January. The race was moved from Sunday to the Saturday the day before in order to better accommodate live TV.

Round	Race	Circuit	Date	Report
1	Liqui Moly Bathurst 12 Hour	Mount Panorama Circuit, Bathurst, Australia	3 February	Report
2	California 8 Hours	WeatherTech Raceway Laguna Seca, Monterey, United States	30 March	Report
3	24 Hours of Spa	Circuit de Spa-Francorchamps, Stavelot, Belgium	27–28 July	Report
4	Suzuka 10 Hours	Suzuka Circuit, Suzuka, Japan	25 August	Report
5	Kyalami 9 Hours	Kyalami Grand Prix Circuit, Midrand, South Africa	23 November	Report

Also part of the Blancpain GT Series Endurance Cup

== Entry list ==
Manufacturer	Team	Car	No.	Drivers	Class	Rounds
Audi	(Australia) Audi Sport Team Valvoline	R8 LMS (2018)	2	(Germany) Christopher Haase	P	1
Audi	(Australia) Audi Sport Team Valvoline	R8 LMS (2018)	2	(Germany) Christopher Mies	P	1
Audi	(Australia) Audi Sport Team Valvoline	R8 LMS (2018)	2	(Germany) Markus Winkelhock	P	1
Audi	(Australia) Audi Sport Team Valvoline	R8 LMS (2018)	22	(South Africa) Kelvin van der Linde	P	1
Audi	(Australia) Audi Sport Team Valvoline	R8 LMS (2018)	22	(Australia) Garth Tander	P	1
Audi	(Australia) Audi Sport Team Valvoline	R8 LMS (2018)	22	(Belgium) Frédéric Vervisch	P	1
Audi	(Australia) Melbourne Performance Centre	R8 LMS (2018)	3	(United Kingdom) Matt Neal	PA	1
Audi	(Australia) Melbourne Performance Centre	R8 LMS (2018)	3	(United Kingdom) Gordon Shedden	PA	1
Audi	(Australia) Melbourne Performance Centre	R8 LMS (2018)	3	(United Kingdom) Pete Storey	PA	1
Audi	(Australia) Melbourne Performance Centre	R8 LMS (2018)	9	(Australia) Marc Cini	PA	1
Audi	(Australia) Melbourne Performance Centre	R8 LMS (2018)	9	(Australia) Dean Fiore	PA	1
Audi	(Australia) Melbourne Performance Centre	R8 LMS (2018)	9	(Australia) Lee Holdsworth	PA	1
Audi	(Belgium) Audi Sport Team WRT	R8 LMS (2019)	1	(Netherlands) Robin Frijns	P	3
Audi	(Belgium) Audi Sport Team WRT	R8 LMS (2019)	1	(Switzerland) Nico Müller	P	3
Audi	(Belgium) Audi Sport Team WRT	R8 LMS (2019)	1	(Germany) René Rast	P	3
Audi	(Belgium) Audi Sport Team WRT	R8 LMS (2019)	2	(Spain) Alex Riberas	P	3
Audi	(Belgium) Audi Sport Team WRT	R8 LMS (2019)	2	(Germany) Frank Stippler	P	3
Audi	(Belgium) Audi Sport Team WRT	R8 LMS (2019)	2	(Belgium) Dries Vanthoor	P	3
Audi	(Belgium) Audi Sport Team WRT	R8 LMS (2019)	10	(Germany) Christopher Haase	P	2
Audi	(Belgium) Audi Sport Team WRT	R8 LMS (2019)	10	(Belgium) Dries Vanthoor	P	2
Audi	(Belgium) Audi Sport Team WRT	R8 LMS (2019)	10	(Belgium) Frédéric Vervisch	P	2
Audi	(Belgium) Audi Sport Team WRT	R8 LMS (2019)	25	(South Africa) Kelvin van der Linde	P	4–5
Audi	(Belgium) Audi Sport Team WRT	R8 LMS (2019)	25	(Belgium) Dries Vanthoor	P	4–5
Audi	(Belgium) Audi Sport Team WRT	R8 LMS (2019)	25	(Belgium) Frédéric Vervisch	P	4–5
Audi	(Japan) Audi Team Hitotsuyama	R8 LMS (2019)	21	(United Kingdom) Richard Lyons	P	4
Audi	(Japan) Audi Team Hitotsuyama	R8 LMS (2019)	21	(Belgium) Alessio Picariello	P	4
Audi	(Japan) Audi Team Hitotsuyama	R8 LMS (2019)	21	(Japan) Ryuichiro Tomita	P	4
Audi	(France) Audi Sport Team Saintéloc	R8 LMS (2019)	25	(Germany) Christopher Haase	P	3
Audi	(France) Audi Sport Team Saintéloc	R8 LMS (2019)	25	(Belgium) Frédéric Vervisch	P	3
Audi	(France) Audi Sport Team Saintéloc	R8 LMS (2019)	25	(Germany) Markus Winkelhock	P	3
Audi	(Germany) / Audi Sport Team Land (Note: Car No. 29 entered as Audi Sport Team Land and car No. 129 as Montaplast by Land Motorsport.); (Germany) / Montaplast by Land Motorsport	R8 LMS (2019)	29	(Germany) Christopher Mies	P	2, 5
Audi	(Germany) / Audi Sport Team Land; (Germany) / Montaplast by Land Motorsport	R8 LMS (2019)	29	(Germany) Markus Winkelhock	P	2, 5
Audi	(Germany) / Audi Sport Team Land; (Germany) / Montaplast by Land Motorsport	R8 LMS (2019)	29	(South Africa) Kelvin van der Linde	P	2
Audi	(Germany) / Audi Sport Team Land; (Germany) / Montaplast by Land Motorsport	R8 LMS (2019)	29	(Germany) Christopher Haase	P	5
Audi	(Germany) / Audi Sport Team Land; (Germany) / Montaplast by Land Motorsport	R8 LMS (2019)	129	(Switzerland) Ricardo Feller	P	3
Audi	(Germany) / Audi Sport Team Land; (Germany) / Montaplast by Land Motorsport	R8 LMS (2019)	129	(United Kingdom) Jamie Green	P	3
Audi	(Germany) / Audi Sport Team Land; (Germany) / Montaplast by Land Motorsport	R8 LMS (2019)	129	(Germany) Christopher Mies	P	3
Audi	(China) Audi Sport Team Absolute Racing	R8 LMS (2019)	125	(Germany) Christopher Haase	P	4
Audi	(China) Audi Sport Team Absolute Racing	R8 LMS (2019)	125	(Germany) Christopher Mies	P	4
Audi	(China) Audi Sport Team Absolute Racing	R8 LMS (2019)	125	(Germany) Markus Winkelhock	P	4
Bentley	(United Kingdom) / Bentley Team M-Sport (Note: Car Nos. 107 and 108 entered as Bentley Team M-Sport and car Nos. 109 and 110 entered as M-Sport Team Bentley.); (United Kingdom) / M-Sport Team Bentley	Continental GT3	107	(France) Jules Gounon	P	All
Bentley	(United Kingdom) / Bentley Team M-Sport; (United Kingdom) / M-Sport Team Bentley	Continental GT3	107	(South Africa) Jordan Pepper	P	All
Bentley	(United Kingdom) / Bentley Team M-Sport; (United Kingdom) / M-Sport Team Bentley	Continental GT3	107	(United Kingdom) Steven Kane	P	1–4
Bentley	(United Kingdom) / Bentley Team M-Sport; (United Kingdom) / M-Sport Team Bentley	Continental GT3	107	(Belgium) Maxime Soulet	P	5
Bentley	(United Kingdom) / Bentley Team M-Sport; (United Kingdom) / M-Sport Team Bentley	Continental GT3	108	(Belgium) Maxime Soulet	P	1–3
Bentley	(United Kingdom) / Bentley Team M-Sport; (United Kingdom) / M-Sport Team Bentley	Continental GT3	108	(Spain) Andy Soucek	P	1, 4–5
Bentley	(United Kingdom) / Bentley Team M-Sport; (United Kingdom) / M-Sport Team Bentley	Continental GT3	108	(Monaco) Vincent Abril	P	1
Bentley	(United Kingdom) / Bentley Team M-Sport; (United Kingdom) / M-Sport Team Bentley	Continental GT3	108	(Finland) Markus Palttala	P	2–3
Bentley	(United Kingdom) / Bentley Team M-Sport; (United Kingdom) / M-Sport Team Bentley	Continental GT3	108	(Spain) Lucas Ordóñez	P	2
Bentley	(United Kingdom) / Bentley Team M-Sport; (United Kingdom) / M-Sport Team Bentley	Continental GT3	108	(United Kingdom) Alex Buncombe	P	3–4
Bentley	(United Kingdom) / Bentley Team M-Sport; (United Kingdom) / M-Sport Team Bentley	Continental GT3	108	(United Kingdom) Seb Morris	P	4
Bentley	(United Kingdom) / Bentley Team M-Sport; (United Kingdom) / M-Sport Team Bentley	Continental GT3	108	(Brazil) Rodrigo Baptista	P	5
Bentley	(United Kingdom) / Bentley Team M-Sport; (United Kingdom) / M-Sport Team Bentley	Continental GT3	108	(United Kingdom) Steven Kane	P	5
Bentley	(United Kingdom) / Bentley Team M-Sport; (United Kingdom) / M-Sport Team Bentley	Continental GT3	109	(Brazil) Rodrigo Baptista	P	3
Bentley	(United Kingdom) / Bentley Team M-Sport; (United Kingdom) / M-Sport Team Bentley	Continental GT3	109	(United Kingdom) Callum MacLeod	P	3
Bentley	(United Kingdom) / Bentley Team M-Sport; (United Kingdom) / M-Sport Team Bentley	Continental GT3	109	(United Kingdom) Seb Morris	P	3
Bentley	(United Kingdom) / Bentley Team M-Sport; (United Kingdom) / M-Sport Team Bentley	Continental GT3	110	(Brazil) Pipo Derani	P	3
Bentley	(United Kingdom) / Bentley Team M-Sport; (United Kingdom) / M-Sport Team Bentley	Continental GT3	110	(Spain) Lucas Ordóñez	P	3
Bentley	(United Kingdom) / Bentley Team M-Sport; (United Kingdom) / M-Sport Team Bentley	Continental GT3	110	(Spain) Andy Soucek	P	3
BMW	(Belgium) Boutsen Ginion	M6 GT3	9	(South Africa) Gennaro Bonafede	Am	3
BMW	(Belgium) Boutsen Ginion	M6 GT3	9	(France) Erik Maris	Am	3
BMW	(Belgium) Boutsen Ginion	M6 GT3	9	(Saudi Arabia) Karim Ojjeh	Am	3
BMW	(Belgium) Boutsen Ginion	M6 GT3	9	(France) Marc Rostan	Am	3
BMW	(Germany) Walkenhorst Motorsport	M6 GT3	34	(Netherlands) Nick Catsburg	P	All
BMW	(Germany) Walkenhorst Motorsport	M6 GT3	34	(Denmark) Mikkel Jensen	P	All
BMW	(Germany) Walkenhorst Motorsport	M6 GT3	34	(Norway) Christian Krognes	P	All
BMW	(Germany) Walkenhorst Motorsport	M6 GT3	36	(Germany) Henry Walkenhorst	Am	3, 5
BMW	(Germany) Walkenhorst Motorsport	M6 GT3	36	(Norway) Anders Buchardt	Am	3
BMW	(Germany) Walkenhorst Motorsport	M6 GT3	36	(United Kingdom) David Pittard	Am	3
BMW	(Germany) Walkenhorst Motorsport	M6 GT3	36	(United States) Don Yount	Am	3
BMW	(Germany) Walkenhorst Motorsport	M6 GT3	36	(South Africa) Gennaro Bonafede	Am	5
BMW	(Germany) Walkenhorst Motorsport	M6 GT3	36	(South Africa) Michael Von Rooyen	Am	5
BMW	(Germany) BMW Team Schnitzer	M6 GT3	42	(Brazil) Augusto Farfus	P	All
BMW	(Germany) BMW Team Schnitzer	M6 GT3	42	(Germany) Martin Tomczyk	P	All
BMW	(Germany) BMW Team Schnitzer	M6 GT3	42	(Australia) Chaz Mostert	P	1–2
BMW	(Germany) BMW Team Schnitzer	M6 GT3	42	(United States) John Edwards	P	3
BMW	(Germany) BMW Team Schnitzer	M6 GT3	42	(United Kingdom) Nick Yelloly	P	4
BMW	(Germany) BMW Team Schnitzer	M6 GT3	42	(South Africa) Sheldon van der Linde	P	5
Ferrari	(Japan) apr with ARN Racing	488 GT3	8	(Japan) Yuta Kamimura	S	4
Ferrari	(Japan) apr with ARN Racing	488 GT3	8	(Japan) Hiroaki Nagai	S	4
Ferrari	(Japan) apr with ARN Racing	488 GT3	8	(Japan) Manabu Orido	S	4
Ferrari	(Germany) Wochenspiegel Team Monschau by Rinaldi	488 GT3	22	(Germany) Jochen Krumbach	S	5
Ferrari	(Germany) Wochenspiegel Team Monschau by Rinaldi	488 GT3	22	(South Africa) David Perel	S	5
Ferrari	(Germany) Wochenspiegel Team Monschau by Rinaldi	488 GT3	22	(Germany) Leonard Weiss	S	5
Ferrari	(Chinese Taipei) HubAuto Corsa	488 GT3	27	(Australia) Nick Foster	P	1–2, 4
Ferrari	(Chinese Taipei) HubAuto Corsa	488 GT3	27	(Australia) Tim Slade	P	1–2
Ferrari	(Chinese Taipei) HubAuto Corsa	488 GT3	27	(Australia) Nick Percat	P	1
Ferrari	(Chinese Taipei) HubAuto Corsa	488 GT3	27	(Spain) Miguel Molina	P	2
Ferrari	(Chinese Taipei) HubAuto Corsa	488 GT3	27	(New Zealand) Nick Cassidy	P	4
Ferrari	(Chinese Taipei) HubAuto Corsa	488 GT3	27	(Finland) Heikki Kovalainen	P	4
Ferrari	(Chinese Taipei) HubAuto Corsa	488 GT3	227	(New Zealand) Nick Cassidy	P	3
Ferrari	(Chinese Taipei) HubAuto Corsa	488 GT3	227	(Australia) Nick Foster	P	3
Ferrari	(Chinese Taipei) HubAuto Corsa	488 GT3	227	(Brazil) Daniel Serra	P	3
Ferrari	(Italy) AF Corse (Note: Car No. 51 entered as Spirit of Race under a Swiss license at Round 1 and as AF Corse under an Italian license at Round 3, car No. 52 entered as AF Corse under an Italian License and car No. 72 entered as SMP Racing under a Russian license.) (Switzerland) Spirit of Race (Russia) SMP Racing	488 GT3	51	(Canada) Paul Dalla Lana	PA	1
Ferrari	(Italy) AF Corse (Switzerland) Spirit of Race (Russia) SMP Racing	488 GT3	51	(Portugal) Pedro Lamy	PA	1
Ferrari	(Italy) AF Corse (Switzerland) Spirit of Race (Russia) SMP Racing	488 GT3	51	(Austria) Mathias Lauda	PA	1
Ferrari	(Italy) AF Corse (Switzerland) Spirit of Race (Russia) SMP Racing	488 GT3	51	(United Kingdom) Sam Bird	P	3
Ferrari	(Italy) AF Corse (Switzerland) Spirit of Race (Russia) SMP Racing	488 GT3	51	(United Kingdom) James Calado	P	3
Ferrari	(Italy) AF Corse (Switzerland) Spirit of Race (Russia) SMP Racing	488 GT3	51	(Italy) Alessandro Pier Guidi	P	3
Ferrari	(Italy) AF Corse (Switzerland) Spirit of Race (Russia) SMP Racing	488 GT3	52	(Italy) Andrea Bertolini	PA	3
Ferrari	(Italy) AF Corse (Switzerland) Spirit of Race (Russia) SMP Racing	488 GT3	52	(Netherlands) Niek Hommerson	PA	3
Ferrari	(Italy) AF Corse (Switzerland) Spirit of Race (Russia) SMP Racing	488 GT3	52	(Belgium) Louis Machiels	PA	3
Ferrari	(Italy) AF Corse (Switzerland) Spirit of Race (Russia) SMP Racing	488 GT3	52	(Finland) Toni Vilander	PA	3
Ferrari	(Italy) AF Corse (Switzerland) Spirit of Race (Russia) SMP Racing	488 GT3	72	(Russia) Mikhail Aleshin	P	3
Ferrari	(Italy) AF Corse (Switzerland) Spirit of Race (Russia) SMP Racing	488 GT3	72	(Spain) Miguel Molina	P	3
Ferrari	(Italy) AF Corse (Switzerland) Spirit of Race (Russia) SMP Racing	488 GT3	72	(Italy) Davide Rigon	P	3
Ferrari	(Japan) CarGuy Racing	488 GT3	777	(United Kingdom) James Calado	P	4
Ferrari	(Japan) CarGuy Racing	488 GT3	777	(Japan) Kei Cozzolino	P	4
Ferrari	(Japan) CarGuy Racing	488 GT3	777	(Spain) Miguel Molina	P	4
Honda	(Japan) Modulo Drago Corse	NSX GT3	034	(Japan) Ryo Michigami	P	4
Honda	(Japan) Modulo Drago Corse	NSX GT3	034	(Japan) Hiroki Otsu	P	4
Honda	(Japan) Modulo Drago Corse	NSX GT3	034	(Japan) Daisuke Nakajima	P	4
Honda	(Japan) Team UpGarage	NSX GT3	18	(Japan) Takashi Kobayashi	P	4
Honda	(Japan) Team UpGarage	NSX GT3	18	(Japan) Kosuke Matsuura	P	4
Honda	(Japan) Team UpGarage	NSX GT3	18	(Japan) Tadasuke Makino	P	4
Honda	(United Kingdom) Jenson Team Rocket RJN	NSX GT3	22	(Switzerland) Philipp Frommenwiler	S	3
Honda	(United Kingdom) Jenson Team Rocket RJN	NSX GT3	22	(United States) Matt McMurry	S	3
Honda	(United Kingdom) Jenson Team Rocket RJN	NSX GT3	22	(United Kingdom) Struan Moore	S	3
Honda	(United Kingdom) Jenson Team Rocket RJN	NSX GT3	22	(Mexico) Ricardo Sánchez	S	3
Honda	(Italy) Honda Team Motul	NSX GT3	30	(Belgium) Bertrand Baguette	P	2–5
Honda	(Italy) Honda Team Motul	NSX GT3	30	(Germany) Mario Farnbacher	P	2–3
Honda	(Italy) Honda Team Motul	NSX GT3	30	(Netherlands) Renger van der Zande	P	2–3
Honda	(Italy) Honda Team Motul	NSX GT3	30	(Italy) Marco Bonanomi	P	4–5
Honda	(Italy) Honda Team Motul	NSX GT3	30	(Japan) Hideki Mutoh	P	4
Honda	(Italy) Honda Team Motul	NSX GT3	30	(United States) Dane Cameron	P	5
Honda	(Malaysia) Arrows Racing	NSX GT3	98	(Macau) Lic Ka Liu	Am	4
Honda	(Malaysia) Arrows Racing	NSX GT3	98	(Hong Kong) Philip Ma	Am	4
Honda	(Malaysia) Arrows Racing	NSX GT3	98	(Hong Kong) Jacky Yeung	Am	4
Mercedes-AMG	(Japan) Mercedes-AMG Team GOOD SMILE	AMG GT3	00	(Japan) Tatsuya Kataoka	P	4
Mercedes-AMG	(Japan) Mercedes-AMG Team GOOD SMILE	AMG GT3	00	(Japan) Kamui Kobayashi	P	4
Mercedes-AMG	(Japan) Mercedes-AMG Team GOOD SMILE	AMG GT3	00	(Japan) Nobuteru Taniguchi	P	4
Mercedes-AMG	(Germany) / Mercedes-AMG Team Black Flacon (Note: Car No. 4 entered as Mercedes-AMG Team Black Falcon and car No. 6 entered as Black Falcon.); (Germany) / Black Falcon	AMG GT3	4	(Netherlands) Yelmer Buurman	P	3
Mercedes-AMG	(Germany) / Mercedes-AMG Team Black Flacon; (Germany) / Black Falcon	AMG GT3	4	(Germany) Maro Engel	P	3
Mercedes-AMG	(Germany) / Mercedes-AMG Team Black Flacon; (Germany) / Black Falcon	AMG GT3	4	(Germany) Luca Stolz	P	3
Mercedes-AMG	(Germany) / Mercedes-AMG Team Black Flacon; (Germany) / Black Falcon	AMG GT3	6	(Germany) Patrick Assenheimer	S	3, 5
Mercedes-AMG	(Germany) / Mercedes-AMG Team Black Flacon; (Germany) / Black Falcon	AMG GT3	6	(Germany) Hubert Haupt	S	3, 5
Mercedes-AMG	(Germany) / Mercedes-AMG Team Black Flacon; (Germany) / Black Falcon	AMG GT3	6	(Italy) Gabriele Piana	S	3
Mercedes-AMG	(Germany) / Mercedes-AMG Team Black Flacon; (Germany) / Black Falcon	AMG GT3	6	(Saudi Arabia) Abdulaziz Al Faisal	S	3
Mercedes-AMG	(Germany) / Mercedes-AMG Team Black Flacon; (Germany) / Black Falcon	AMG GT3	6	(Russia) Sergei Afanasiev	S	5
Mercedes-AMG	(Germany) Mercedes-AMG Team SPS Automotive Performance	AMG GT3	10	(Netherlands) Yelmer Buurman	P	5
Mercedes-AMG	(Germany) Mercedes-AMG Team SPS Automotive Performance	AMG GT3	10	(Germany) Maximilian Götz	P	5
Mercedes-AMG	(Germany) Mercedes-AMG Team SPS Automotive Performance	AMG GT3	10	(Germany) Luca Stolz	P	5
Mercedes-AMG	(United Kingdom) / Strakka Racing (Note: Car No. 43 entered as Strakka Racing and car No. 44 entered as Mercedes-AMG Team Strakka Racing.); (United Kingdom) / Mercedes-AMG Team Strakka Racing	AMG GT3	43	(Austria) Dominik Baumann	P	2
Mercedes-AMG	(United Kingdom) / Strakka Racing; (United Kingdom) / Mercedes-AMG Team Strakka Racing	AMG GT3	43	(United Kingdom) Adam Christodoulou	P	2
Mercedes-AMG	(United Kingdom) / Strakka Racing; (United Kingdom) / Mercedes-AMG Team Strakka Racing	AMG GT3	43	(Denmark) Christina Nielsen	P	2
Mercedes-AMG	(United Kingdom) / Strakka Racing; (United Kingdom) / Mercedes-AMG Team Strakka Racing	AMG GT3	44	(United Kingdom) Gary Paffett	P	2–5
Mercedes-AMG	(United Kingdom) / Strakka Racing; (United Kingdom) / Mercedes-AMG Team Strakka Racing	AMG GT3	44	(France) Tristan Vautier	P	2–5
Mercedes-AMG	(United Kingdom) / Strakka Racing; (United Kingdom) / Mercedes-AMG Team Strakka Racing	AMG GT3	44	(United Kingdom) Lewis Williamson	P	2–5
Mercedes-AMG	(Australia) SunEnergy1 Racing	AMG GT3	75^{1}	(Australia) Kenny Habul	PA	1, 4
Mercedes-AMG	(Australia) SunEnergy1 Racing	AMG GT3	75^{1}	(Austria) Dominik Baumann	PA	1
Mercedes-AMG	(Australia) SunEnergy1 Racing	AMG GT3	75^{1}	(Germany) Thomas Jäger	PA	1
Mercedes-AMG	(Australia) SunEnergy1 Racing	AMG GT3	75^{1}	(Germany) Nico Bastian	PA	4
Mercedes-AMG	(Australia) SunEnergy1 Racing	AMG GT3	75^{1}	(Canada) Mikaël Grenier	PA	4
Mercedes-AMG	(Hong Kong) / Mercedes-AMG Team Craft Bamboo Black Falcon (Note: Car No. 77 entered as Mercedes-AMG Team Craft Bamboo Black Falcon at Round 1 and as Mercedes-AMG Team Craft-Bamboo Racing at Round 4.); (Hong Kong) / Mercedes-AMG Team Craft-Bamboo Racing	AMG GT3	77	(Germany) Luca Stolz	P	1, 4
Mercedes-AMG	(Hong Kong) / Mercedes-AMG Team Craft Bamboo Black Falcon; (Hong Kong) / Mercedes-AMG Team Craft-Bamboo Racing	AMG GT3	77	(United Kingdom) Gary Paffett	P	1
Mercedes-AMG	(Hong Kong) / Mercedes-AMG Team Craft Bamboo Black Falcon; (Hong Kong) / Mercedes-AMG Team Craft-Bamboo Racing	AMG GT3	77	(Germany) Maro Engel	P	1
Mercedes-AMG	(Hong Kong) / Mercedes-AMG Team Craft Bamboo Black Falcon; (Hong Kong) / Mercedes-AMG Team Craft-Bamboo Racing	AMG GT3	77	(Netherlands) Yelmer Buurman	P	4
Mercedes-AMG	(Hong Kong) / Mercedes-AMG Team Craft Bamboo Black Falcon; (Hong Kong) / Mercedes-AMG Team Craft-Bamboo Racing	AMG GT3	77	(Germany) Maximilian Götz	P	4
Mercedes-AMG	(France) Mercedes-AMG Team AKKA ASP	AMG GT3	88	(Monaco) Vincent Abril	P	3
Mercedes-AMG	(France) Mercedes-AMG Team AKKA ASP	AMG GT3	88	(Italy) Raffaele Marciello	P	3
Mercedes-AMG	(France) Mercedes-AMG Team AKKA ASP	AMG GT3	88	(Germany) Fabian Schiller	P	3
Mercedes-AMG	(Australia) Mercedes-AMG Team Vodafone	AMG GT3	888	(New Zealand) Shane van Gisbergen	P	1
Mercedes-AMG	(Australia) Mercedes-AMG Team Vodafone	AMG GT3	888	(Australia) Craig Lowndes	P	1
Mercedes-AMG	(Australia) Mercedes-AMG Team Vodafone	AMG GT3	888	(Australia) Jamie Whincup	P	1
Mercedes-AMG	(Hong Kong) Mercedes-AMG Team GruppeM Racing	AMG GT3	888	(Netherlands) Yelmer Buurman	P	2
Mercedes-AMG	(Hong Kong) Mercedes-AMG Team GruppeM Racing	AMG GT3	888	(Germany) Maro Engel	P	2
Mercedes-AMG	(Hong Kong) Mercedes-AMG Team GruppeM Racing	AMG GT3	888	(Germany) Luca Stolz	P	2
Mercedes-AMG	(Hong Kong) Mercedes-AMG Team GruppeM Racing	AMG GT3	999	(Germany) Maximilian Buhk	P	All
Mercedes-AMG	(Hong Kong) Mercedes-AMG Team GruppeM Racing	AMG GT3	999	(Germany) Maximilian Götz	P	1–3
Mercedes-AMG	(Hong Kong) Mercedes-AMG Team GruppeM Racing	AMG GT3	999	(Italy) Raffaele Marciello	P	1–2, 4–5
Mercedes-AMG	(Hong Kong) Mercedes-AMG Team GruppeM Racing	AMG GT3	999	(Austria) Lucas Auer	P	3
Mercedes-AMG	(Hong Kong) Mercedes-AMG Team GruppeM Racing	AMG GT3	999	(Germany) Maro Engel	P	4–5
Nissan	(Japan) GTNET Motor Sports	GT-R Nismo GT3 (2015)	5	(Japan) Teruhiko Hamano	PA	4
Nissan	(Japan) GTNET Motor Sports	GT-R Nismo GT3 (2015)	5	(Japan) Kazuki Hoshino	PA	4
Nissan	(Japan) GTNET Motor Sports	GT-R Nismo GT3 (2015)	5	(Japan) Eiji Yamada	PA	4
Nissan	(Japan) MP Racing	GT-R Nismo GT3 (2015)	9	(Japan) Joe Shindo	Am	4
Nissan	(Japan) MP Racing	GT-R Nismo GT3 (2015)	9	(Japan) Yusaku Shibata	Am	4
Nissan	(Japan) MP Racing	GT-R Nismo GT3 (2015)	9	(Japan) Takumi Takata	Am	4
Nissan	(Hong Kong) KCMG	GT-R Nismo GT3 (2018)	(0)18	(Hong Kong) Alexandre Imperatori	P	All
Nissan	(Hong Kong) KCMG	GT-R Nismo GT3 (2018)	(0)18	(United Kingdom) Oliver Jarvis	P	All
Nissan	(Hong Kong) KCMG	GT-R Nismo GT3 (2018)	(0)18	(Italy) Edoardo Liberati	P	All
Nissan	(Hong Kong) KCMG	GT-R Nismo GT3 (2018)	35	(Australia) Josh Burdon	P	All
Nissan	(Hong Kong) KCMG	GT-R Nismo GT3 (2018)	35	(Japan) Katsumasa Chiyo	P	All
Nissan	(Hong Kong) KCMG	GT-R Nismo GT3 (2018)	35	(Japan) Tsugio Matsuda	P	1, 3–4
Nissan	(Hong Kong) KCMG	GT-R Nismo GT3 (2018)	35	(United Kingdom) Alex Buncombe	P	2
Nissan	(Hong Kong) KCMG	GT-R Nismo GT3 (2018)	35	(Brazil) Joao Paulo de Oliveira	P	5
Porsche	(United States) Competition Motorsports / McElrea Racing	911 GT3 R (2018)	12	(Australia) David Calvert-Jones	PA	1
Porsche	(United States) Competition Motorsports / McElrea Racing	911 GT3 R (2018)	12	(France) Kévin Estre	PA	1
Porsche	(United States) Competition Motorsports / McElrea Racing	911 GT3 R (2018)	12	(New Zealand) Jaxon Evans	PA	1
Porsche	(United States) Black Swan Racing	911 GT3 R (2018)	540	(Netherlands) Jeroen Bleekemolen	PA	1
Porsche	(United States) Black Swan Racing	911 GT3 R (2018)	540	(Germany) Marc Lieb	PA	1
Porsche	(United States) Black Swan Racing	911 GT3 R (2018)	540	(United States) Tim Pappas	PA	1
Porsche	(New Zealand) EBM	911 GT3 R (2018)	911	(France) Romain Dumas	P	1
Porsche	(New Zealand) EBM	911 GT3 R (2018)	911	(France) Mathieu Jaminet	P	1
Porsche	(New Zealand) EBM	911 GT3 R (2018)	911	(Germany) Sven Müller	P	1
Porsche	(New Zealand) EBM	911 GT3 R (2018)	912	(Australia) Matt Campbell	P	1
Porsche	(New Zealand) EBM	911 GT3 R (2018)	912	(Norway) Dennis Olsen	P	1
Porsche	(New Zealand) EBM	911 GT3 R (2018)	912	(Germany) Dirk Werner	P	1
Porsche	(Italy) Dinamic Motorsport	911 GT3 R (2019)	12	(New Zealand) Earl Bamber	P	5
Porsche	(Italy) Dinamic Motorsport	911 GT3 R (2019)	12	(Australia) Matt Campbell	P	5
Porsche	(Italy) Dinamic Motorsport	911 GT3 R (2019)	12	(Belgium) Laurens Vanthoor	P	5
Porsche	(United Arab Emirates) GPX Racing	911 GT3 R (2019)	20	(Denmark) Michael Christensen	P	3, 5
Porsche	(United Arab Emirates) GPX Racing	911 GT3 R (2019)	20	(France) Kévin Estre	P	3, 5
Porsche	(United Arab Emirates) GPX Racing	911 GT3 R (2019)	20	(Austria) Richard Lietz	P	3, 5
Porsche	(Germany) Frikadelli Racing Team	911 GT3 R (2019)	31	(France) Mathieu Jaminet	P	5
Porsche	(Germany) Frikadelli Racing Team	911 GT3 R (2019)	31	(Norway) Dennis Olsen	P	5
Porsche	(Germany) Frikadelli Racing Team	911 GT3 R (2019)	31	(United Kingdom) Nick Tandy	P	5
Porsche	(Japan) LM corsa	911 GT3 R (2019)	60	(Japan) Juichi Wakisaka	PA	4
Porsche	(Japan) LM corsa	911 GT3 R (2019)	60	(Japan) Shigekazu Wakisaka	PA	4
Porsche	(Japan) LM corsa	911 GT3 R (2019)	60	(Japan) Kei Nakanishi	PA	4
Porsche	(Germany) Rowe Racing	911 GT3 R (2019)	98	(France) Romain Dumas	P	3
Porsche	(Germany) Rowe Racing	911 GT3 R (2019)	98	(France) Mathieu Jaminet	P	3
Porsche	(Germany) Rowe Racing	911 GT3 R (2019)	98	(Germany) Sven Müller	P	3
Porsche	(Germany) Rowe Racing	911 GT3 R (2019)	99	(Australia) Matt Campbell	P	3
Porsche	(Germany) Rowe Racing	911 GT3 R (2019)	99	(Norway) Dennis Olsen	P	3
Porsche	(Germany) Rowe Racing	911 GT3 R (2019)	99	(Germany) Dirk Werner	P	3
Porsche	(Germany) KÜS Team75 Bernhard	911 GT3 R (2019)	117	(New Zealand) Earl Bamber	P	3
Porsche	(Germany) KÜS Team75 Bernhard	911 GT3 R (2019)	117	(Germany) Timo Bernhard	P	3
Porsche	(Germany) KÜS Team75 Bernhard	911 GT3 R (2019)	117	(Belgium) Laurens Vanthoor	P	3
Porsche	(Germany) KÜS Team75 Bernhard	911 GT3 R (2019)	911	(France) Romain Dumas	P	5
Porsche	(Germany) KÜS Team75 Bernhard	911 GT3 R (2019)	911	(Germany) Sven Müller	P	5
Porsche	(Germany) KÜS Team75 Bernhard	911 GT3 R (2019)	911	(Germany) Dirk Werner	P	5
Porsche	(United States) Park Place Motorsports (Note: Car entered as Park Place Motorsports at Round 2 and as Earl Bamber Motorsport (EBM) at Round 4.) (New Zealand) EBM	911 GT3 R (2019)	911	(France) Romain Dumas	P	2, 4
Porsche	(United States) Park Place Motorsports (New Zealand) EBM	911 GT3 R (2019)	911	(France) Mathieu Jaminet	P	2, 4
Porsche	(United States) Park Place Motorsports (New Zealand) EBM	911 GT3 R (2019)	911	(Germany) Sven Müller	P	2, 4
Porsche	(United States) Wright Motorsports (Note: Car entered as Wright Motorsports at Round 2 and as Absolute Racing at Round 4.) (China) Absolute Racing	911 GT3 R (2019)	912	(Australia) Matt Campbell	P	2, 4
Porsche	(United States) Wright Motorsports (China) Absolute Racing	911 GT3 R (2019)	912	(Norway) Dennis Olsen	P	2, 4
Porsche	(United States) Wright Motorsports (China) Absolute Racing	911 GT3 R (2019)	912	(Germany) Dirk Werner	P	2, 4
Porsche	(Australia) AMAC Motorsport	997 GT3 R	51	(Australia) Andrew Macpherson	S	4
Porsche	(Australia) AMAC Motorsport	997 GT3 R	51	(Australia) Ben Porter	S	4
Porsche	(Australia) AMAC Motorsport	997 GT3 R	51	(Australia) Brad Shiels	S	4

Icon	Class
P	Pro Cup
S	Silver Cup
PA	Pro-Am Cup
Am	Am Cup

Cars not nominated by a manufacturer and therefore not eligible for manufacturer or overall driver points
Drivers participating in championship for Bronze-rated drivers

^{1} – Car No. 75 was nominated for manufacturer points at Round 1, but was not nominated for manufacturer points at Round 4.

== Race results ==
Rnd.	Circuit	Pole position	IGTC Winners	Bronze Winners	Winning Manufacturer
1	(Australia) Bathurst	(Hong Kong) No. 999 Mercedes-AMG Team GruppeM Racing (Note: Jake Dennis took Pole position in the No. 62 R-Motorsport car, but Raffaele Marciello was the highest qualified Intercontinental GT Challenge driver. The R-Motorsport team was later excluded from the results due to a technical breach related to the mandated rev limit threshold of the Aston Martin Vantage GT3's V12 engine.)	(New Zealand) No. 912 EBM	No finishers	Mercedes-AMG
1	(Australia) Bathurst	(Germany) Maximilian Buhk (Germany) Maximilian Götz (Italy) Raffaele Marciello	(Australia) Matt Campbell (Norway) Dennis Olsen (Germany) Dirk Werner	No finishers	Mercedes-AMG
2	(United States) Laguna Seca	(Italy) No. 30 Honda Team Motul	(Chinese Taipei) No. 27 HubAuto Corsa	No entries	Mercedes-AMG
2	(United States) Laguna Seca	(Belgium) Bertrand Baguette (Germany) Mario Farnbacher (Netherlands) Renger van der Zande	(Australia) Nick Foster (Spain) Miguel Molina (Australia) Tim Slade	No entries	Mercedes-AMG
3	(Belgium) Spa-Francorchamps	(Germany) No. 4 Mercedes-AMG Team Black Falcon	(United Arab Emirates) No. 20 GPX Racing	No entries	Porsche
3	(Belgium) Spa-Francorchamps	(Netherlands) Yelmer Buurman (Germany) Maro Engel (Germany) Luca Stolz	(Denmark) Michael Christensen (France) Kévin Estre (Austria) Richard Lietz	No entries	Porsche
4	(Japan) Suzuka	(Germany) No. 42 BMW Team Schnitzer	(Belgium) No. 25 Audi Sport Team WRT	(Australia) No. 75 SunEnergy1 Racing	Audi
4	(Japan) Suzuka	(Brazil) Augusto Farfus (Germany) Martin Tomczyk (United Kingdom) Nick Yelloly	(South Africa) Kelvin van der Linde (Belgium) Dries Vanthoor (Belgium) Frédéric Vervisch	(Australia) Kenny Habul	Audi
5	(South Africa) Kyalami	(Germany) No. 31 Frikadelli Racing	(Germany) No. 31 Frikadelli Racing	No entries	Porsche
5	(South Africa) Kyalami	(France) Mathieu Jaminet (Norway) Dennis Olsen (United Kingdom) Nick Tandy	(France) Mathieu Jaminet (Norway) Dennis Olsen (United Kingdom) Nick Tandy	No entries	Porsche

== Championship standings ==
Scoring system

Championship points were awarded for the first ten positions in each race. Entries were required to complete 75% of the winning car's race distance in order to be classified and earn points, with the exception of Bathurst where a car simply had to cross the finish line to be classified. Individual drivers were required to participate for a minimum of 25 minutes in order to earn championship points in any race. A manufacturer only received points for its two highest placed cars in each round.

Position	**1st**	**2nd**	**3rd**	**4th**	**5th**	**6th**	**7th**	**8th**	**9th**	**10th**
Points	25	18	15	12	10	8	6	4	2	1

=== Drivers' championships ===
The results indicate the classification relative to other drivers in the series, not the classification in the race.

Pos.	Driver	Manufacturer	BAT (Australia)	LGA (United States)	SPA (Belgium)	SUZ (Japan)	KYA (South Africa)	Points
1	(Norway) Dennis Olsen	Porsche	1	Ret	6	3	**1**	73
2	(Germany) Maximilian Götz	Mercedes-AMG	**2**	2	8	4	5	62
3	(Germany) Maximilian Buhk	Mercedes-AMG	**2**	2	8	2	Ret	58
4	(Italy) Raffaele Marciello	Mercedes-AMG	**2**	2	10	2	Ret	55
5	(Belgium) Frédéric Vervisch	Audi	Ret	4	3	1	10	53
6	(France) Mathieu Jaminet	Porsche	Ret	3	4	13	**1**	52
6	(Australia) Matt Campbell	Porsche	1	Ret	6	3	8	52
8	(Germany) Dirk Werner	Porsche	1	Ret	6	3	9	50
9	(Germany) Luca Stolz	Mercedes-AMG	Ret	6	**2**	4	5	48
9	(Netherlands) Yelmer Buurman	Mercedes-AMG		6	**2**	4	5	48
10	(Germany) Christopher Haase	Audi	10	4	3	7	4	46
11	(Germany) Maro Engel	Mercedes-AMG	Ret	6	**2**	2	Ret	44
12	(France) Kévin Estre	Porsche	Ret		1		3	40
12	(Denmark) Michael Christensen (Austria) Richard Lietz	Porsche			1		3	40
12	(Germany) Markus Winkelhock	Audi	10	7	3	7	4	40
14	(Belgium) Dries Vanthoor	Audi		4	15	1	10	38
14	(Brazil) Augusto Farfus (Germany) Martin Tomczyk	BMW	4	5	Ret	**5**	7	38
16	(South Africa) Kelvin van der Linde	Audi	Ret	7		1	10	32
17	(France) Romain Dumas (Germany) Sven Müller	Porsche	Ret	3	4	13	9	29
18	(Spain) Miguel Molina	Ferrari		1	Ret	11		25
18	(Australia) Nick Foster	Ferrari	12	1	Ret	24		25
18	(Australia) Tim Slade	Ferrari	12	1				25
18	(United Kingdom) Nick Tandy	Porsche					**1**	25
18	(Germany) Christopher Mies	Audi	10	7	11	7	4	25
21	(Netherlands) Nick Catsburg (Denmark) Mikkel Jensen (Norway) Christian Krognes	BMW	Ret	8	9	Ret	2	24
22	(Australia) Chaz Mostert	BMW	4	5				22
23	(Hong Kong) Alexandre Imperatori (United Kingdom) Oliver Jarvis (Italy) Edoardo Liberati	Nissan	6	9	12	18	6	18
24	(New Zealand) Shane van Gisbergen (Australia) Craig Lowndes (Australia) Jamie Whincup	Mercedes-AMG	3					15
25	(Belgium) Maxime Soulet	Bentley	5	11	Ret		11	10
25	(Spain) Andy Soucek	Bentley	5		16	21	16	10
25	(Monaco) Vincent Abril	Bentley	5					10
25	(Monaco) Vincent Abril	Mercedes-AMG			10			10
25	(Belgium) Bertrand Baguette	Honda		**13**	5	15	Ret	10
25	(Germany) Mario Farnbacher (Netherlands) Renger van der Zande	Honda		**13**	5			10
25	(United Kingdom) Nick Yelloly	BMW				**5**		10
25	(France) Jules Gounon (South Africa) Jordan Pepper	Bentley	7	Ret	20	8	11	10
25	(United Kingdom) Steven Kane	Bentley	7	Ret	20	8	16	10
25	(New Zealand) Earl Bamber (Belgium) Laurens Vanthoor	Porsche			7		8	10
31	(Australia) Josh Burdon (Japan) Katsumasa Chiyo	Nissan	11	12	18	6	15	8
31	(Japan) Tsugio Matsuda	Nissan	11		18	6		8
32	(Germany) Timo Bernhard	Porsche			7			6
32	(South Africa) Sheldon van der Linde	BMW					7	6
34	(Canada) Paul Dalla Lana (Portugal) Pedro Lamy (Austria) Mathias Lauda	Ferrari	8					4
34	(Austria) Lucas Auer	Mercedes-AMG			8			4
35	(Australia) Marc Cini (Australia) Dean Fiore (Australia) Lee Holdsworth	Audi	9					2
35	(United Kingdom) Gary Paffett	Mercedes-AMG	Ret	Ret	13	9	Ret	2
35	(France) Tristan Vautier (United Kingdom) Lewis Williamson	Mercedes-AMG		Ret	13	9	Ret	2
37	(Austria) Dominik Baumann	Mercedes-AMG	Ret	10				1
37	(United Kingdom) Adam Christodoulou	Mercedes-AMG		10				1
37	(Denmark) Christina Nielsen	Mercedes-AMG		10				1
37	(Germany) Fabian Schiller	Mercedes-AMG			10			1
37	(Japan) Tatsuya Kataoka (Japan) Kamui Kobayashi (Japan) Nobuteru Taniguchi	Mercedes-AMG				10		1
	(Spain) Lucas Ordóñez	Bentley		11	16			0
	(Finland) Markus Palttala	Bentley		11	Ret			0
	(Switzerland) Ricardo Feller (United Kingdom) Jamie Green	Audi			11			0
	(United Kingdom) James Calado	Ferrari			Ret	11		0
	(Japan) Kei Cozzolino	Ferrari				11		0
	(Australia) Nick Percat	Ferrari	12					0
	(United Kingdom) Alex Buncombe	Nissan		12				0
	(United Kingdom) Alex Buncombe	Bentley			Ret	21		0
	(Russia) Sergei Afanasiev (Germany) Patrick Assenheimer (Germany) Hubert Haupt	Mercedes-AMG					12	0
	(Germany) Jochen Krumbach (South Africa) David Perel (Germany) Leonard Weiss	Ferrari					13	0
	(South Africa) Gennaro Bonafede	BMW			19		14	0
	(Netherlands) Robin Frijns (Switzerland) Nico Müller (Germany) René Rast	Audi			14			0
	(Japan) Takashi Kobayashi (Japan) Kosuke Matsuura (Japan) Tadasuke Makino	Honda				14		0
	(South Africa) Michael Van Rooyen (Germany) Henry Walkenhorst	BMW					14	0
	(Spain) Alex Riberas (Germany) Frank Stippler	Audi			15			0
	(Italy) Marco Bonanomi	Honda				15	Ret	0
	(Japan) Hideki Mutoh	Honda				15		0
	(Brazil) Joao Paulo de Oliveira	Nissan					15	0
	(Brazil) Rodrigo Baptista	Bentley			Ret		16	0
	(Brazil) Pipo Derani	Bentley			16			0
	(United Kingdom) Richard Lyons (Belgium) Alessio Picariello (Japan) Ryuichiro Tomita	Audi				16		0
	(Switzerland) Philipp Frommenwiler (United States) Matt McMurry (United Kingdom) Struan Moore (Mexico) Ricardo Sánchez	Honda			17			0
	(Japan) Ryo Michigami (Japan) Hiroki Otsu (Japan) Daisuke Nakajima	Honda				17		0
	(France) Erik Maris (Saudi Arabia) Karim Ojjeh (France) Marc Rostan	BMW			19			0
	(Japan) Juichi Wakisaka (Japan) Shigekazu Wakisaka (Japan) Kei Nakanishi	Porsche				19		0
	(Japan) Joe Shindo (Japan) Yusaku Shibata (Japan) Takumi Takata	Nissan				20		0
	(Russia) Mikhail Aleshin (Italy) Davide Rigon	Ferrari			21			0
	(United Kingdom) Seb Morris	Bentley			Ret	21		0
	(Japan) Teruhiko Hamano (Japan) Kazuki Hoshino (Japan) Eiji Yamada	Nissan				22		0
	(Australia) Andrea Macpherson (Australia) Ben Porter (Australia) Brad Shiels	Porsche				23		0
	(New Zealand) Nick Cassidy	Ferrari			Ret	24		0
	(Finland) Heikki Kovalainen	Ferrari				24		0
	(Australia) Kenny Habul	Mercedes-AMG	Ret			12		0
	(Germany) Thomas Jäger	Mercedes-AMG	Ret					0
	(Australia) Garth Tander	Audi	Ret					0
	(United States) David Calvert-Jones (New Zealand) Jaxon Evans	Porsche	Ret					0
	(United States) John Edwards	BMW			Ret			0
	(United Kingdom) Sam Bird (Italy) Alessandro Pier Guidi	Ferrari			Ret			0
	(Italy) Andrea Bertolini (Netherlands) Niek Hommerson (Belgium) Louis Machiels (Finland) Toni Vilander	Ferrari			Ret			0
	(Brazil) Daniel Serra	Ferrari			Ret			0
	(Norway) Anders Buchardt (United Kingdom) David Pittard (Germany) Henry Walkenhorst (United States) Don Yount	BMW			Ret			0
	(United Kingdom) Callum MacLeod	Bentley			Ret			0
	(Japan) Yuta Kamimura (Japan) Hiroaki Nagai (Japan) Manabu Orido	Ferrari				Ret		0
	(Macau) Lic Ka Liu (Hong Kong) Philip Ma (Hong Kong) Jacky Yeung	Honda				Ret		0
	(United States) Dane Cameron	Honda					Ret	0
	(Netherlands) Jeroen Bleekemolen (Germany) Marc Lieb (United States) Tim Pappas	Porsche	WD					
	(United Kingdom) Matt Neal (United Kingdom) Gordon Shedden (United Kingdom) Pete Storey	Audi	WD					
Drivers ineligible to score points
	(Germany) Nico Bastian (Canada) Mikaël Grenier	Mercedes-AMG				12		
Pos.	Driver	Manufacturer	BAT (Australia)	LGA (United States)	SPA (Belgium)	SUZ (Japan)	KYA (South Africa)	Points

Colour	Result
Gold	Winner
Silver	Second place
Bronze	Third place
Green	Points classification
Blue	Non-points classification
Blue	Non-classified finish (NC)
Purple	Retired, not classified (Ret)
Red	Did not qualify (DNQ)
Red	Did not pre-qualify (DNPQ)
Black	Disqualified (DSQ)
White	Did not start (DNS)
White	Withdrew (WD)
White	Race cancelled (C)
Blank	Did not practice (DNP)
Blank	Did not arrive (DNA)
Blank	Excluded (EX)

**Bold** – Pole
Italics – Fastest Lap

==== Bronze Drivers ====
Pos.	Driver	Manufacturer	BAT (Australia)	LGA (United States)	SPA (Belgium)	SUZ (Japan)	KYA (South Africa)	Points
1	(Australia) Kenny Habul	Mercedes-AMG	Ret			12		25
	(United States) Tim Pappas	Porsche	WD					
Pos.	Driver	Manufacturer	BAT (Australia)	LGA (United States)	SPA (Belgium)	SUZ (Japan)	KYA (South Africa)	Points

=== Manufacturers' championship ===
Only the top two cars of each specific manufacturer is eligible for points.

Pos.	Manufacturer	Car	BAT (Australia)	LGA (United States)	SPA (Belgium)	SUZ (Japan)	KYA (South Africa)	Points
1	Porsche	911 GT3 R (2018); 911 GT3 R (2019)	1	3	1	3	**1**	133
1	Porsche	911 GT3 R (2018); 911 GT3 R (2019)	Ret	Ret	4	13	3	133
2	Mercedes-AMG	AMG GT3	**2**	2	**2**	2	5	126
2	Mercedes-AMG	AMG GT3	3	6	8	4	12	126
3	Audi	R8 LMS (2018); R8 LMS (2019)	9	4	3	1	4	85
3	Audi	R8 LMS (2018); R8 LMS (2019)	10	7	14	7	10	85
4	BMW	M6 GT3	4	5	9	**5**	2	66
4	BMW	M6 GT3	Ret	8	17	Ret	7	66
5	Ferrari	488 GT3	8	1	19	11	13	31
5	Ferrari	488 GT3	12		Ret	23		31
6	Nissan	GT-R Nismo GT3	6	9	12	6	6	30
6	Nissan	GT-R Nismo GT3	11	12	16	17	15	30
7	Bentley	Continental GT3	5	11	16	8	11	24
7	Bentley	Continental GT3	7	Ret	18	20	16	24
8	Honda	NSX GT3		**13**	5	14	Ret	10
8	Honda	NSX GT3			15	15		10
Pos.	Manufacturer	Car	BAT (Australia)	LGA (United States)	SPA (Belgium)	SUZ (Japan)	KYA (South Africa)	Points

== See also ==
- Intercontinental GT Challenge
