= 2016 Global Touring Car Championship =

Motor racing season

Seasons
- ← None 2017 →

The 2016 Global Touring Car Championship (commercially known as the 2016 Sasol GTC Championship) was the inaugural season of the Global Touring Car Championship, a South African touring car racing series. The series was scheduled for six rounds, consisting of a total of fourteen races from 9 August until 3 December.

Michael Stephen became the series's first champion, taking seven race wins from the first eight races behind the wheel of an Audi A3 GTC. Daniel Rowe took the title in GTC Production, the second class of the series consisting of production racing cars, driving a Volkswagen Golf GTi. BMW took the manufacturer's title in the GTC Class, while Volkswagen secured the GTC Production title.

== Teams and drivers ==
=== GTC ===
| Manufacturer | Car | Team | No. | Drivers | Rounds |
|---|---|---|---|---|---|
| (Germany) Audi | Audi A3 GTC | Engen Xtreme Team | 12 | (South Africa) Michael Stephen | All |
| (Germany) Audi | Audi A3 GTC | Engen Xtreme Team | 38 | (South Africa) Simon Moss | All |
| (Germany) BMW | BMW M2 GTC | Sasol GTC Racing Team | 08 | (South Africa) Hennie Groenewald | All |
| (Germany) BMW | BMW M2 GTC | Sasol GTC Racing Team | 32 | (South Africa) Gennaro Bonafede | All |
| (Germany) BMW | BMW M2 GTC | EPS Couriers BMW | 14 | (South Africa) Johan Fourie | 2-5 |
| (Germany) BMW | BMW M2 GTC | Rustenburg Steel Construction BMW | 95 | (South Africa) Michael van Rooyen | 4-5 |
| (Germany) Volkswagen | Volkswagen Jetta GTC | Volkswagen Motorsport | 21 | (South Africa) Graeme Nathan | All |
| (Germany) Volkswagen | Volkswagen Jetta GTC | Volkswagen Motorsport | 57 | (South Africa) Matthew Hodges | All |

=== GTC Production ===
| Manufacturer | Car | Team | No. | Drivers | Rounds |
|---|---|---|---|---|---|
| (Germany) Volkswagen | Volkswagen Golf GTi | Volkswagen Motorsport | 11 | (South Africa) Daniel Rowe | All |
| (Germany) Volkswagen | Volkswagen Golf GTi | Volkswagen Motorsport | 44 | (South Africa) Mandla Mdakane | All |
| (Germany) Volkswagen | Volkswagen Golf GTi | VW Genuine Parts | 15 | (South Africa) Charl Smalberger | All |
| (Germany) Volkswagen | Volkswagen Golf GTi | Kalex VW | 35 | (South Africa) Devon Piazza Musso | 5-6 |
| (United States) Ford | Ford Focus ST | N/A | 42 | (South Africa) Shaun Duminy | 1-5 |
| (Germany) BMW | BMW Z4 | GTCX Zambezi Auto | 74 | (South Africa) Mark du Toit | 3 |

== Calendar ==
| Round | | Circuit | Date | Pole position | Overall winner | GTC-P Winner |
|---|---|---|---|---|---|---|
| 1 | R1 | (South Africa) Zwartkops Raceway, Centurion | 9 August | (South Africa) Michael Stephen | (South Africa) Michael Stephen | (South Africa) Shaun Duminy |
| 1 | R2 | (South Africa) Zwartkops Raceway, Centurion | 9 August | (South Africa) Michael Stephen | (South Africa) Michael Stephen | (South Africa) Daniel Rowe |
| 2 | R1 | (South Africa) Aldo Scribante Circuit, Port Elizabeth | 10 September | (South Africa) Michael Stephen | (South Africa) Michael Stephen | (South Africa) Daniel Rowe |
| 2 | R2 | (South Africa) Aldo Scribante Circuit, Port Elizabeth | 10 September | (South Africa) Michael Stephen | (South Africa) Michael Stephen | (South Africa) Charl Smalberger |
| 2 | R3 | (South Africa) Aldo Scribante Circuit, Port Elizabeth | 10 September | (South Africa) Michael Stephen | (South Africa) Michael Stephen | (South Africa) Daniel Rowe |
| 3 | R1 | (South Africa) Killarney Race Track, Cape Town | 24 September | (South Africa) Michael Stephen | (South Africa) Michael Stephen | (South Africa) Daniel Rowe |
| 3 | R2 | (South Africa) Killarney Race Track, Cape Town | 24 September | (South Africa) Gennaro Bonafede | (South Africa) Gennaro Bonafede | (South Africa) Daniel Rowe |
| 3 | R3 | (South Africa) Killarney Race Track, Cape Town | 24 September | (South Africa) Michael Stephen | (South Africa) Michael Stephen | (South Africa) Daniel Rowe |
| 4 | R1 | (South Africa) Kyalami Grand Prix Circuit, Midrand | 23 October | (South Africa) Gennaro Bonafede | (South Africa) Gennaro Bonafede | (South Africa) Daniel Rowe |
| 4 | R2 | (South Africa) Kyalami Grand Prix Circuit, Midrand | 23 October | (South Africa) Gennaro Bonafede | (South Africa) Gennaro Bonafede | (South Africa) Daniel Rowe |
| 5 | R1 | (South Africa) Zwartkops Raceway, Centurion | 26 November | (South Africa) Michael Stephen | (South Africa) Michael Stephen | (South Africa) Daniel Rowe |
| 5 | R2 | (South Africa) Zwartkops Raceway, Centurion | 26 November | (South Africa) Michael Stephen | (South Africa) Gennaro Bonafede | (South Africa) Daniel Rowe |
| 6 | R1 | (South Africa) Prince George Circuit, East London | 3 December | (South Africa) Michael Stephen | (South Africa) Matthew Hodges | (South Africa) Charl Smalberger |
| 6 | R2 | (South Africa) Prince George Circuit, East London | 3 December | (South Africa) Michael Stephen | (South Africa) Gennaro Bonafede | (South Africa) Daniel Rowe |

== Championship standings ==
Points were awarded to the top ten classified finishers as follows:

| Race Position | **1st** | **2nd** | **3rd** | **4th** | **5th** | **6th** | **7th** | **8th** | **9th** | **10th** | **FL** |
| Points | 50 | 38 | 28 | 20 | 14 | 9 | 6 | 4 | 2 | 1 | 3 |

Additionally, the top three placed drivers in qualifying will also receive points.

| Qualifying Position | **1st** | **2nd** | **3rd** |
| Points | 5 | 3 | 1 |

=== Drivers' standings ===
| Pos. | Driver | ZWA1 (South Africa) | | ALD (South Africa) | | | KIL (South Africa) | | | KYA (South Africa) | | ZWA2 (South Africa) | | PRI (South Africa) | | Points |
GTC Class
| 1 | (South Africa) Michael Stephen | **1**^{1} | **1**^{1} | **1**^{1} | **1**^{1} | **1**^{1} | **1**^{1} | 2^{2} | **1** ^{1} | 2^{3} | 2 | **1**^{1} | **Ret**^{1} | **5**^{1} | **5** ^{1} | 619 |
| 2 | (South Africa) Gennaro Bonafede | 3^{3} | 3^{3} | 3 | 4 | 5 | 3^{3} | **1**^{1} | 3^{3} | **1**^{1} | **1**^{1} | 3 | 1^{3} | 4^{3} | 1 | 508 |
| 3 | (South Africa) Matthew Hodges | 2 | 4 | 6 | 3 | 6 | Ret | 6 | 5 | 4^{2} | 5 | 4 | 4 | 1 | 4^{3} | 296 |
| 4 | (South Africa) Hennie Groenewald | 5 | DNS | 4 | 5 | 3 | 4 | 5 | Ret | Ret | Ret | 2 | 2 | 2 | 2 | 262 |
| 5 | (South Africa) Simon Moss | 6 | 5 | 5^{3} | 2^{3} | Ret^{2} | 2^{2} | 3^{3} | 2^{2} | 3 | Ret | 7 | Ret | Ret^{2} | DNS^{2} | 219 |
| 6 | (South Africa) Graeme Nathan | 4 | 2 | 7 | 6 | 4 | Ret | 7 | Ret | 5 | 3 | 6 | 6 | 3 | 3 | 215 |
| 7 | (South Africa) Johan Fourie | | | 2^{2} | Ret^{2} | 2^{2} | 5 | 4 | 4 | Ret | Ret | 5 | 3^{2} | | | 198 |
| 8 | (South Africa) Michael van Rooyen | | | | | | | | | Ret | 4 | Ret | 5 | | | 34 |

| Colour | Result |
|---|---|
| Gold | Winner |
| Silver | Second place |
| Bronze | Third place |
| Green | Points classification |
| Blue | Non-points classification |
| Blue | Non-classified finish (NC) |
| Purple | Retired, not classified (Ret) |
| Red | Did not qualify (DNQ) |
| Red | Did not pre-qualify (DNPQ) |
| Black | Disqualified (DSQ) |
| White | Did not start (DNS) |
| White | Withdrew (WD) |
| White | Race cancelled (C) |
| Blank | Did not practice (DNP) |
| Blank | Did not arrive (DNA) |
| Blank | Excluded (EX) |

**Bold** – Pole
Italics – Fastest Lap
1 – 5 Points for Pole
2 – 3 Points for P2
3 – 1 Point for P3
