= Jayde Kruger =

South African racer (born 1988)

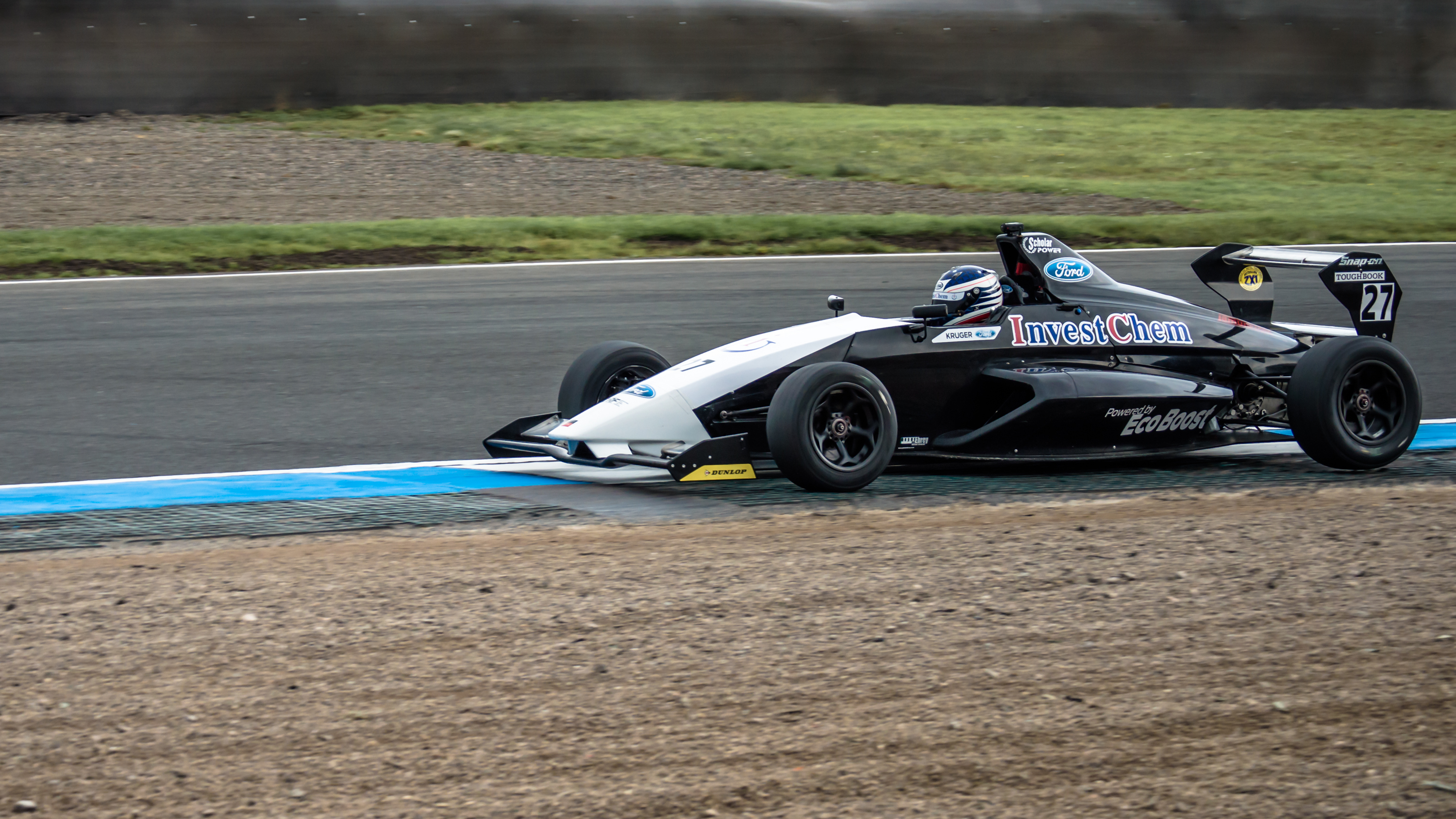
- Jayde Kruger driving in the 2013 British Formula Ford Championship
- Nationality: (South Africa) South African
- Born: 24 February 1988 (age 38) Edenvale, South Africa

Previous series
- 2018 2013–2014 2011–2012 2010 2008–2009 2003–2007: Britcar; British Formula Ford; Formula Volkswagen RSA; Formula Ford Duratec RSA; Formula Volkswagen RSA; Formula Ford Zetec RSA

Championship titles
- 2014 2009, 2011, 2012 2010 2007: British Formula Ford; Formula Volkswagen RSA; Formula Ford Duratec; Formula Ford Zetec RSA

Jayde Kruger (born 24 February 1988 in Edenvale, Gauteng) is a racing driver from South Africa. He won the 2014 British Formula Ford championship and also numerous titles in South Africa.

== Racing career ==
Kruger started his auto racing career in the South African Formula Ford Zetec in 2003. In his Mygale, the 17-year-old won one race in 2005. He finished second in the season behind Robert Wolk who dominated the series. The South African also entered the prestigious Formula Ford Festival but failed to qualify for the final. He returned to his native Formula Ford championship in 2006 and 2007. After again finishing second in the championship in 2006, he won the championship in 2007. In 2007, Kruger dominated the series scoring nine race wins in sixteen races.

The following year, Kruger stepped up to South Africa's fastest formula racing class, the Formula Volkswagen South Africa, in its inaugural season in 2008. While Gavin Cronje won the title Kruger secured the fifth place in the championship. The following year was highly successful for the South African driver. At Aldo Scribante Circuit, Kruger won the opening races. He scored another two race wins at Zwartkops Raceway. As he scored an additional eight podium finishes Kruger won the title. Kruger also races a partial schedule in Formula Ford. At the 2009 A1 Grand Prix of South Africa, the Formula Ford ran two support races. Kruger won both races at the Kyalami Grand Prix Circuit.

In 2010, Kruger returned full-time in his native Formula Ford Duratec championship. After a poor start of the season with three DNF's Kruger won six races and won the championship. Kruger also returned to the Formula Ford Festival at Brands Hatch. He was entered by Jamun Racing in a Mygale SJ10. After finishing in the top-ten in the heat races and in the top-five in the quarter final and semi final, Kruger qualified for the final. Kruger started the final in ninth place. After a difficult race around the Indy circuit, Kruger finished in fifteenth position.

For 2011 and 2012, Kruger competed in the Formula Volkswagen South Africa. Kruger won both titles now being the most successful driver in the series. He only missed the podium twice during the two seasons. After his success he was picked up by Jamun Racing to compete in the new British Formula Ford. For the first time the Formula Ford made use of aerodynamic aids. Kruger joined the series as of the fourth round at Oulton Park. In his first race weekend, Kruger achieved two podium finishes. His first win in the championship came in the penultimate round of the championship. At Silverstone the South African beat Juan Angel Rosso and Sam Brabham. Kruger eventually finished sixth in the championship point standings. For 2014, Kruger joined JTR for a championship title assault. The championship was won by South African driver Jayde Kruger, finishing six points clear of Falcon Motorsport's Harrison Scott. Kruger won the most races during the season with 13 (to Scott's five), but Scott's greater consistency – 24 podiums from 30 races – compared to Kruger (17 podiums) allowed him to remain in contention entering the final round at Brands Hatch, as both drivers entered the weekend with 651 points apiece. Scott won the first race to take the championship lead, before the two drivers collided on the second lap of race two. Kruger went on to win the race, while Scott failed to finish. Falcon Motorsport protested the result, before a JTR counter-appeal allowed the race result to stand as it was. Thus, Kruger's eighth-place finish in the final race was enough for the championship, despite Scott winning.

As a prize for winning the British Formula Ford title, Kruger tested a Motorbase Performance Ford Focus BTCC at Snetterton.

Sporting positions
Preceded by Brett Mayberry	Formula Ford Zetec South Africa; 2007	Succeeded by Robert Wolk
Preceded by Gavin Cronje	Formula Volkswagen South Africa; 2009	Succeeded by Simon Moss
Preceded by none	Formula Ford Duratec South Africa; 2010	Succeeded by Matthew Merton
Preceded by Simon Moss	Formula Volkswagen South Africa; 2011–2012	Succeeded by Robert Wolk
Preceded by Dan Cammish	British Formula Ford; 2014	Succeeded by None (Series ended)
