= 2023 Global Touring Car Championship =

Motorsport season

The 2023 Global Touring Car Championship (commercially titled 2023 Sasol GTC Championship) was the eighth season of the South African Global Touring Car Championship. The season was contested over seven rounds, starting at the Kyalami Grand Prix Circuit on 24 February and ending at the Zwartkops Raceway on October 14.

== Calendar ==
No.	Circuit	Dates	Map
1	(South Africa) Kyalami Grand Prix Circuit, Midrand	February 23–25	2023 Global Touring Car Championship is located in South Africa
2	(South Africa) Killarney Motor Racing Complex, Cape Town	March 17–18	2023 Global Touring Car Championship is located in South Africa
3	(South Africa) Zwartkops Raceway, Pretoria	May 19–20	2023 Global Touring Car Championship is located in South Africa
4	(South Africa) Aldo Scribante Circuit, Gqeberha	June 16–17	2023 Global Touring Car Championship is located in South Africa
5	(South Africa) Prince George Circuit, East London	July 21–22	2023 Global Touring Car Championship is located in South Africa
6	(South Africa) Killarney Motor Racing Complex, Cape Town	September 8–9	2023 Global Touring Car Championship is located in South Africa
7	(South Africa) Zwartkops Raceway, Pretoria	October 13–15	2023 Global Touring Car Championship is located in South Africa

== Entry list ==
Manufacturer	Car	Team	No.	Driver	Events
GTC
Audi	S3 Mk.4	WCT Engineering	89	(South Africa) Joshua Le Roux	1–5
Ford	Focus Mk.4	Chemical Logistics Racing	42	(South Africa) Julian van der Watt	4–5
Toyota	Corolla E210	Chemical Logistics Racing	1	(South Africa) Robert Wolk	1–5
Toyota	Corolla E210	Toyota Gazoo Racing South Africa	3	(South Africa) Saood Variawa	1–5
Toyota	Corolla E210	Toyota Gazoo Racing South Africa	28	(South Africa) Nathi Msimanga	1–3, 5
Toyota	Corolla E210	Toyota Gazoo Racing South Africa	95	(South Africa) Michael van Rooyen	1–5
Volkswagen	Golf Mk.8	Chemical Logistics Racing	40	(South Africa) Andrew Rackstraw	1–3, 5
GTC Supacup
Volkswagen	Polo Mk.6	Van Niekerk Racing	6	(Scotland) Paul Luti	3–5
Volkswagen	Polo Mk.6	Van Niekerk Racing	9	(South Africa) Danie van Niekerk	3–5
Volkswagen	Polo Mk.6	Dias Group	7	(South Africa) Calvin Dias	1–3
Volkswagen	Polo Mk.6	Dias Group	46	(South Africa) Dominic Dias	1–3
Volkswagen	Polo Mk.6	Nathan Hammond Racing	10	(South Africa) Keagan Masters	1
Volkswagen	Polo Mk.6	Nathan Hammond Racing	11	(South Africa) Nathan Hammond	1
Volkswagen	Polo Mk.6	Hype Energy Drinks	12	(South Africa) Bradley Liebenberg	1–5
Volkswagen	Polo Mk.6	Volkswagen Motorsport South Africa	14	(South Africa) Jonathan Mogotsi	1–5
Volkswagen	Polo Mk.6	Platinum Wheels	30	(South Africa) Jean-Pierre van der Walt	1–4
Volkswagen	Polo Mk.6	Kalex	41	(South Africa) Karah Hill	3–5
Volkswagen	Polo Mk.6	Carello Auto	53	(South Africa) Keegan Campos	1–5
Volkswagen	Polo Mk.6	Carello Auto	100	(South Africa) Tato Carello	1–3
Volkswagen	Polo Mk.6	Stradale Motorsport	54	(South Africa) Arnold Neveling	2–5
Volkswagen	Polo Mk.6	Angri Racing	94	(South Africa) Tate Bishop	1–5
Volkswagen	Polo Mk.6	Telerex	101	(South Africa) Stefan Snyders	1

== Results and standings ==
=== Summary ===
Round		Circuit	Date	Pole position	Fastest lap	Winning driver	Winning team	Source
1	R1	(South Africa) Kyalami	February 24	GTC: (South Africa) Robert Wolk; GTC SC: (South Africa) Keegan Campos	GTC: (South Africa) Saood Variawa; GTC SC: (South Africa) Jonathan Mogotsi	GTC: (South Africa) Saood Variawa; GTC SC: (South Africa) Keegan Campos	GTC: Toyota Gazoo Racing South Africa; GTC SC: Carello Auto	
1	R2	(South Africa) Kyalami	February 25		GTC: (South Africa) Saood Variawa; GTC SC: (South Africa) Keegan Campos	GTC: (South Africa) Michael van Rooyen; GTC SC: (South Africa) Keegan Campos	GTC: Toyota Gazoo Racing South Africa; GTC SC: Carello Auto	
2	R1	(South Africa) Cape Town	March 18	GTC: (South Africa) Saood Variawa; GTC SC: (South Africa) Bradley Liebenberg	GTC: (South Africa) Saood Variawa; GTC SC: (South Africa) Keegan Campos	GTC: (South Africa) Saood Variawa; GTC SC: (South Africa) Bradley Liebenberg	GTC: Toyota Gazoo Racing South Africa; GTC SC: Hype Energy Drinks	
2	R2	(South Africa) Cape Town	March 18		GTC: (South Africa) Saood Variawa; GTC SC: (South Africa) Bradley Liebenberg	GTC: (South Africa) Andrew Rackstraw; GTC SC: (South Africa) Bradley Liebenberg	GTC: Chemical Logistics Racing; GTC SC: Hype Energy Drinks	
3	R1	(South Africa) Pretoria	May 20	GTC: (South Africa) Saood Variawa; GTC SC: (South Africa) Bradley Liebenberg	GTC: (South Africa) Saood Variawa; GTC SC: (South Africa) Bradley Liebenberg	GTC: (South Africa) Saood Variawa; GTC SC: (South Africa) Bradley Liebenberg	GTC: Toyota Gazoo Racing South Africa; GTC SC: Hype Energy Drinks	
3	R2	(South Africa) Pretoria	May 20		GTC: (South Africa) Michael van Rooyen; GTC SC: (South Africa) Bradley Liebenberg	GTC: (South Africa) Michael van Rooyen; GTC SC: (South Africa) Bradley Liebenberg	GTC: Toyota Gazoo Racing South Africa; GTC SC: Hype Energy Drinks	
4	R1	(South Africa) Gqeberha	June 17	GTC: (South Africa) Saood Variawa; GTC SC: (South Africa) Keegan Campos	GTC: (South Africa) Saood Variawa; GTC SC: (South Africa) Keegan Campos	GTC: (South Africa) Saood Variawa; GTC SC: (South Africa) Keegan Campos	GTC: Toyota Gazoo Racing South Africa; GTC SC: Carello Auto	
4	R2	(South Africa) Gqeberha	June 17		GTC: (South Africa) Saood Variawa; GTC SC: (South Africa) Keegan Campos	GTC: (South Africa) Robert Wolk; GTC SC: (South Africa) Keegan Campos	GTC: Chemical Logistics Racing; GTC SC: Carello Auto	
5	R1	(South Africa) East London	July 22	GTC: (South Africa) Robert Wolk; GTC SC: (South Africa) Bradley Liebenberg	GTC: (South Africa) Saood Variawa; GTC SC: (South Africa) Jonathan Mogotsi	GTC: (South Africa) Robert Wolk; GTC SC: (South Africa) Bradley Liebenberg	GTC: Chemical Logistics Racing; GTC SC: Hype Energy Drinks	
5	R2	(South Africa) East London	July 22		GTC: (South Africa) Robert Wolk; GTC SC: (South Africa) Jonathan Mogotsti	GTC: (South Africa) Robert Wolk; GTC SC: (South Africa) Jonathan Mogotsti	GTC: Chemical Logistics Racing; GTC SC: Volkswagen Motorsport South Africa	
6	R1	(South Africa) Cape Town	September 8–9					
6	R2	(South Africa) Cape Town	September 8–9					
7	R1	(South Africa) Pretoria	October 14–15					
7	R2	(South Africa) Pretoria	October 14–15					

=== Championship standings ===
Points system

Race Position	1st	2nd	3rd	4th	5th	6th	7th	8th	9th	10th	Pole	FL
Points	20	17	14	12	10	8	6	4	2	1	1	1

Drivers

Pos.	Driver	(South Africa) KYA		(South Africa) KIL1		(South Africa) ZWA1		(South Africa) ASC		(South Africa) PGC		(South Africa) KIL2		(South Africa) ZWA2		Points
Pos.	Driver	RD1	RD2	RD1	RD2	RD1	RD2	RD1	RD2	RD1	RD2	RD1	RD2	RD1	RD2	Points
GTC
1	(South Africa) Saood Variawa	1	4	1	2	1	3	1	2	2	2					137
2	(South Africa) Robert Wolk	2	5	2	4	4	2	2	1	1	1					130
3	(South Africa) Nathi Msimanga	3	6	3	3	2	4	7	5	7	DNF					82
4	(South Africa) Michael van Rooyen	6	1	DNF	5	3	1	4	3	6	5					80
5	(South Africa) Andrew Rackstraw	4	3	4	1	DNS	WD	5	DNF	4	3					70
6	(South Africa) Joshua Le Roux	5	2	DNF	6	DNF	5	6	6	5	DNF					55
7	(South Africa) Julian van der Watt							3	4	3	4					40
GTC Supacup
1	(South Africa) Keegan Campos	1	1	2	2	4	4	1	1	4	4					168
2	(South Africa) Bradley Liebenberg	3	DNF	1	1	1	1	2	2	1	2					167
3	(South Africa) Jonathan Mogotsi	2	2	3	4	2	3	4	3	2	1					159
4	(South Africa) Arnold Neveling			4	3	3	2	3	4	5	3					105
5	(South Africa) Tate Bishop	5	5	5	7	11	7	6	5	3	5					92
6	(South Africa) Tato Carello	6	3	6	5	8	DNF									48
7	(South Africa) Danie van Niekerk					7	8	7	7	6	6					44
8	(South Africa) Dominic Dias	4	DNF	7	6	5	5									42
9	(South Africa) Calvin Dias	7	DNF	8	9	6	DNF									20
10	(South Africa) Jean-Pierre van der Walt	11	7	DNF	8	12	6	5	7							19
11	(South Africa) Keagan Masters	8	4													16
12	(Scotland) Paul Luti					9	9	8	8	DNF	DNF					16
13	(South Africa) Karah Hill					10	10	9	DNS	7	DSQ					10
14	(South Africa) Stefan Snyders	10	6													8
15	(South Africa) Nathan Hammond	9	DNF													2
