= 2009 Formula Le Mans Cup =

The 2009 Formula Le Mans Cup season was the only season of the Formula Le Mans Cup, a support series for the Le Mans Series and the 24 Hours of Le Mans. All competitors utilized the Oreca FLM09 spec prototype. The season featured ten races held over six events from 10 May to 20 September 2009. Nico Verdonck claimed the title ahead of Gavin Cronje, despite the drivers sharing a car all season. Verdonck benefitted from points awarded for pole positions and fastest laps, giving him a four-point advantage of Cronje. Their team, DAMS, also won the teams championship.

== Race calendar and results ==
The Formula Le Mans Cup schedule consisted of several types of events. Four events, held in support for the Le Mans Series, featured two races of 60 minutes each. A fifth event at the 24 Hours of Le Mans utilized only a single 60 minute race. The final event of the season at Magny-Cours featured three 60 minute races in succession with a winner determined only at the end of the third race.

Round	Circuit	Date	Winning drivers	Winning team
1	(Belgium) Circuit de Spa-Francorchamps	May 9	(Belgium) Nico Verdonck (South Africa) Gavin Cronje	(France) DAMS
2	(Belgium) Circuit de Spa-Francorchamps	May 10	(Belgium) Nico Verdonck (South Africa) Gavin Cronje	(France) DAMS
3	(France) Circuit de la Sarthe	June 13	(Belgium) Nico Verdonck (South Africa) Gavin Cronje	(France) DAMS
4	(Portugal) Autódromo Internacional do Algarve	July 31	(France) David Zollinger (France) Damien Toulemonde	(France) Applewood-LD Autosport
5	(Portugal) Autódromo Internacional do Algarve	August 1	(Belgium) Nico Verdonck (South Africa) Gavin Cronje	(France) DAMS
6	(Germany) Nürburgring	August 22	(Belgium) Nico Verdonck (South Africa) Gavin Cronje	(France) DAMS
7	(Germany) Nürburgring	August 23	(Belgium) Nico Verdonck (South Africa) Gavin Cronje	(France) DAMS
8	(United Kingdom) Silverstone Circuit	September 11	(Belgium) Nico Verdonck (South Africa) Gavin Cronje	(France) DAMS
9	(United Kingdom) Silverstone Circuit	September 13	(Switzerland) Mathias Beche (Finland) Valle Mäkelä	(Switzerland) Hope Polevision Racing
10	(France) Circuit de Nevers Magny-Cours	September 20	(Switzerland) Mathias Beche (Finland) Valle Mäkelä	(Switzerland) Hope Polevision Racing

== Championship standings ==
Points are awarded to the top ten finishers in the order 20-15-12-10-8-6-4-3-2-1.

=== Drivers' standings ===
An additional bonus point was available for individual drivers at each race; these could be earned by winning pole position or by setting the fastest lap of the race. A championship was also awarded to the best amateur driver over the season.

Pos	Driver	Team	Rd 1	Rd 2	Rd 3	Rd 4	Rd 5	Rd 6	Rd 7	Rd 8	Rd 9	Rd 10	Total
1	(Belgium) Nico Verdonck	(France) DAMS	(21)	20	20	**13**	20	20	(21)	**21**	15	0	171
2	(South Africa) Gavin Cronje	(France) DAMS	20	20	20	12	20	20	20	20	15	0	167
3	(Switzerland) Mathias Beche	(Switzerland) Hope Polevision Racing	12	15	**16**	10	15	(16)	3	(16)	**(22)**	**21**	146
4	(Finland) Valle Mäkelä	(Switzerland) Hope Polevision Racing	12	15	15	10	15	15	3	15	20	20	140
5	(France) David Zollinger	(France) Applewood-LD Autosport	2	**13**	0	(21)	12	6	15	12	10	15	106
6	(France) Damien Toulemonde	(France) Applewood-LD Autosport	2	12	0	20	12	6	15	12	10	15	104
7	(France) Gary Chalandon	(Belgium) Boutsen Energy Racing	15	2	6	15	10	12	10	8	3	8	89
8	(Switzerland) Christophe Pillon	(Switzerland) Hope Polevision Racing	8	8	12	4	6	8	12	3	6	20	87
9	(France) Dimitri Enjalbert	(Belgium) Boutsen Energy Racing	**16**	2		15	(11)	**13**	10				67
10	(Switzerland) Natacha Gachnang	(Switzerland) Hope Polevision Racing			12	4	6	8	**13**	3	6		52
11=	(Italy) Luca Moro	(France) DAMS	4	0	0	2	8	4	8	6	4	12	48
11=	(Germany) Wolfgang Kaufmann	(France) DAMS	4	0	0	2	8	4	8	6	4	12	48
13	(Austria) Dominik Kraihamer	(Belgium) Boutsen Energy Racing			6	8	1	10	0	8	3	10	46
14	(United Kingdom) Lionel Robert	(Belgium) Boutsen Energy Racing								10	12	10	32
15	(France) Richard Mori	(France) Ibañez Racing Service	0	3		3	0	3	6	2	2	6	25
16	(United Kingdom) Luke Hines	(Belgium) Boutsen Energy Racing								10	12		22
17=	(France) Johan-Boris Scheier	(Belgium) Boutsen Energy Racing	1	1	0	8	**2**					8	20
17=	(France) William Cavailhès	(France) Ibañez Racing Service			4	3	0	3	6	2	2		20
19	(France) Philippe Haezebrouck	(France) Applewood-LD Autosport			3	6	4	2	4				19
20	(Norway) Thor-Christian Ebbesvik	(Switzerland) Hope Polevision Racing	8	8									16
21=	(France) Jean-Michel Martin	(Belgium) Boutsen Energy Racing	10	4									14
21=	(France) Maxime Martin	(Belgium) Boutsen Energy Racing	10	4									14
23=	(France) Michaël Rossi	(France) Exagon Engineering	3	10									13
23=	(Morocco) Mehdi Bennani	(France) Exagon Engineering	3	10									13
23=	(Monaco) Marc Faggionato	(France) Applewood-LD Autosport			3	6	4						13
26=	(France) Damien Charveriat	(France) DAMS								4	8		12
26=	(United Kingdom) Charles Hollings	(France) DAMS								4	8		12
26=	(Belgium) Stéphane Lémeret	(France) DAMS	6	6									12
26=	(Belgium) Vincent Vosse	(France) DAMS	6	6									12
30	(France) Fabien Rosier	(France) DAMS			(11)								11
31=	(France) Vincent Capillaire	(France) DAMS			10								10
31=	(France) Mathieu Cheruy	(Belgium) Boutsen Energy Racing						10	0				10
33	(France) François Desprez	(France) Ibañez Racing Service	0	3								6	9
34=	(France) Julien Canal	(France) Graff Racing			8								8
34=	(France) Ludovic Badey	(France) Graff Racing			8								8
36=	(France) José Ibañez	(France) Ibañez Racing Service										6	6
36=	(Sweden) Linus Ohlsson	(France) Applewood-LD Autosport						2	4				6
38	(France) Thomas Duchene	(France) Exagon Engineering	0	0	1	1	2			0	1		5
39=	(France) Frédéric da Rocha	(France) Ibañez Racing Service			4								4
39=	(Belgium) Tom Cloet	(France) Applewood-LD Autosport										4	4
39=	(France) Jean-Philippe Belloc	(France) Applewood-LD Autosport										4	4
39=	(France) Raymond Narac	(France) Applewood-LD Autosport										4	4
43=	(Greece) Kosta Kanaroglou	(Spain) Escuela Española de Pilotos				0	3						3
43=	(Spain) Oliver Campos-Hull	(Spain) Escuela Española de Pilotos				0	3						3
43=	(France) Damien Chanard	(Belgium) Boutsen Energy Racing				1	2						3
46=	(France) Anthony Beltoise	(Belgium) Boutsen Energy Racing			2								2
46=	(France) Gabriël Abergel	(Belgium) Boutsen Energy Racing			2								2
46=	(France) Pascal Ballay	(Belgium) Boutsen Energy Racing	1	1	0								2
49=	(France) Franck Lagorce	(France) Exagon Engineering	0	(1)									1
49=	(Japan) Keiko Ihara	(France) Exagon Engineering			1								1

Key
	Rookie
**Bold**	Pole position
(Brackets)	Fastest Lap

=== Teams' standings ===
Pos	Team	Rd 1	Rd 2	Rd 3	Rd 4	Rd 5	Rd 6	Rd 7	Rd 8	Rd 9	Rd 10	Total
1	(France) DAMS	26	26	30	14	28	24	28	26	23	12	237
2	(Switzerland) Hope Polevision Racing	20	23	27	14	21	23	15	18	26	21	208
3	(Belgium) Boutsen Energy Racing	25	6	8	23	12	22	10	18	15	19	158
4	(France) Applewood-LD Autosport	2	12	3	26	16	8	19	12	10	19	127
5	(France) Ibañez Racing Service	0	3	4	3	0	3	6	2	2	6	29
6	(France) Exagon Engineering	3	10	1								14
7	(France) Graff Racing			8								8
8	(Spain) Escuela Española de Pilotos				0	3						3
