= 2014 British Formula Ford Championship =

The 2014 Dunlop MSA Formula Ford Championship of Great Britain was a multi-event, open-wheel single seater motor racing championship held across England and Scotland. The championship featured a mix of professional motor racing teams and privately funded drivers, competing in Formula Ford cars that conformed to the technical regulations for the championship. This, the 38th British Formula Ford season, was the second year of the single class format, with all drivers using the latest cars built to the Formula Ford EcoBoost specification. There was also an award for the highest placed Rookie. Part of the TOCA tour, it formed part of the extensive program of support categories built up around the BTCC centrepiece. The season commenced on 30 March at Brands Hatch – on the circuit's Indy configuration – and concluded on 12 October at the same venue, utilising the Grand Prix circuit, after 30 races held at 10 meetings, all in support of the 2014 British Touring Car Championship season.

The championship was won by South African driver Jayde Kruger of the JTR team, finishing six points clear of Falcon Motorsport's Harrison Scott. Kruger won the most races during the season with 13 (to Scott's 5), but Scott's greater consistency – 24 podiums from 30 races – compared to Kruger (17 podiums) allowed him to remain in contention entering the final round at Brands Hatch, as both drivers entered the weekend with 651 points apiece. Scott won the first race to take the championship lead, before the two drivers collided on the second lap of race two. Kruger went on to win the race, while Scott failed to finish. Falcon Motorsport protested the result, before a JTR counter-appeal allowed the race result to stand as it was. Thus, Kruger's eighth place finish in the final race was enough for the championship, despite Scott winning. Falcon Motorsport again contested the result, with the case being heard at the court of appeal, for the Motor Sports Association. Kruger was confirmed champion in November after Falcon's protest was rejected.

The battle for third place in the championship was equally fraught, with a quartet of drivers being split by 11 points at season's end. Top Scholarship class runner Ashley Sutton, a five-time race winner for MBM Motorsport, was the victor in the battle; he finished six points clear of Radical Motorsport's Juan Rosso, who took his only win during the season at Thruxton. Rosso himself finished a point clear of Kruger's team-mate Max Marshall, who won a pair of races at Snetterton and Rockingham respectively. James Abbott, another Radical Motorsport driver, was also a two-time winner, and he finished sixth in the drivers' championship, taking wins at the opening Brands Hatch meeting and Croft. The only other winner, with two wins, was Sam Brabham for JTR, before his season was cut short due to budgetary issues; he had won two of the three races to be held at Thruxton. Sutton was a comfortable winner of the Scholarship class along with his third place overall finish, finishing almost 200 points clear of his next best class rival, Ricky Collard, Scott's team-mate at Falcon Motorsport. The Teams' Cup was won by JTR, despite Falcon Motorsport closing in at the final round; JTR were still able to finish clear by 33 points, while the Nations' Cup was won by South Africa, on the basis of Kruger's results.

== Championship changes ==
To bring the championship into line with many other junior single seater championships, series organisers announced that the second race of each meeting would be held with a partially reversed grid.

== Teams and drivers ==
Team	No.	Drivers	Chassis/Engine	Class	Rounds
JTR	1	(Australia) Sam Brabham	Mygale M12-SJ/Mountune		1–4
JTR	2	(South Africa) Jayde Kruger	Mygale M12-SJ/Mountune		All
JTR	18	(United Kingdom) Max Marshall	Mygale M12-SJ/Mountune		All
JTR	20	(United Kingdom) Clay Mitchell	Mygale M12-SJ/Mountune	S	8–10
Jamun Racing	4	(United Kingdom) Jack Barlow	Mygale M12-SJ/Scholar		1
Jamun Racing	16	(United Kingdom) Ashley Sutton	Mygale M12-SJ/Scholar	S	3–5
MBM Motorsport	4	(United Kingdom) Jack Barlow	Mygale M12-SJ/Scholar		10
MBM Motorsport	16	(United Kingdom) Ashley Sutton	Mygale M12-SJ/Scholar	S	6–10
MBM Motorsport	79	(United Kingdom) Jessica Hawkins	Mygale M12-SJ/Scholar	S	9
MBM Motorsport	94	(United Kingdom) Michael O'Brien	Mygale M12-SJ/Scholar	S	6, 8–10
Falcon Motorsport	6	(United Kingdom) Harrison Scott	Mygale M13-SJ/Swindon		All
Falcon Motorsport	11	(United Kingdom) Ricky Collard	Mygale M12-SJ/Swindon	S	All
Falcon Motorsport	23	(United Kingdom) Chris Mealin	Mygale M12-SJ/Swindon	S	All
Meridian Motorsport	16	(United Kingdom) Ashley Sutton	Mygale M12-SJ/Scholar	S	1
Meridian Motorsport	35	(United Kingdom) Connor Jupp	Mygale M12-SJ/Scholar	S	4–5
Meridian Motorsport	75	(United Kingdom) Bobby Thompson	Mygale M12-SJ/Scholar	S G	2–3
Meridian Motorsport	82	(United Kingdom) Connor Mills	Mygale M12-SJ/Scholar	S	1–5
SWB	17	(United Kingdom) James Webb	Sinter LA12/Scholar	S	1–2
SWB	88	(Australia) Greg Holloway	Sinter LA12/Scholar		All
Richardson Racing	24	(Nigeria) Ovie Iroro	Mygale M12-SJ/Scholar	S	2–3, 9–10
Richardson Racing	25	(United Kingdom) Louise Richardson	Mygale M12-SJ/Scholar	S	5–10
Richardson Racing	72	(United Kingdom) Louise Richardson	Mygale M12-SJ/Scholar	G	1
Richardson Racing	71	(United Kingdom) Ben Constanduros	Mygale M12-SJ/Scholar	S G	1
Richardson Racing	76	(United Kingdom) Andy Richardson	Mygale M12-SJ/Scholar		4
Radical Motorsport	26	(Argentina) Juan Rosso	Mygale M13-SJ/Mountune		All
Radical Motorsport	74	(United Kingdom) James Abbott	Mygale M13-SJ/Mountune		All

Icon	Class
G	Guest
S	Scholarship

== Race calendar and results ==
The provisional calendar was announced on 14 September 2013, with no major changes from 2013. All races were held in the United Kingdom.

Round		Circuit	Date	Pole position	Fastest lap	Winning driver	Winning team	Scholarship winner
1	R1	Brands Hatch (Indy Circuit, Kent)	29 March	(United Kingdom) Harrison Scott	(South Africa) Jayde Kruger	(South Africa) Jayde Kruger	JTR	(United Kingdom) Ricky Collard
1	R2	Brands Hatch (Indy Circuit, Kent)	29 March		(United Kingdom) Max Marshall	(United Kingdom) James Abbott	Radical Motorsport	(United Kingdom) Ricky Collard
1	R3	Brands Hatch (Indy Circuit, Kent)	30 March	(United Kingdom) Harrison Scott	(United Kingdom) Harrison Scott	(South Africa) Jayde Kruger	JTR	(United Kingdom) Chris Mealin
2	R4	Donington Park (National Circuit, Leicestershire)	19 April	(South Africa) Jayde Kruger	(South Africa) Jayde Kruger	(South Africa) Jayde Kruger	JTR	(United Kingdom) Connor Mills
2	R5	Donington Park (National Circuit, Leicestershire)	20 April		(United Kingdom) Harrison Scott	(United Kingdom) Harrison Scott	Falcon Motorsport	(United Kingdom) Connor Mills
2	R6	Donington Park (National Circuit, Leicestershire)	20 April	(United Kingdom) Harrison Scott	(United Kingdom) Harrison Scott	(South Africa) Jayde Kruger	JTR	(United Kingdom) Connor Mills
3	R7	Thruxton Circuit (Hampshire)	3 May	(Australia) Sam Brabham	(United Kingdom) Max Marshall	(Australia) Sam Brabham	JTR	(United Kingdom) Ashley Sutton
3	R8	Thruxton Circuit (Hampshire)	3 May		(Australia) Sam Brabham	(Argentina) Juan Rosso	Radical Motorsport	(United Kingdom) Ashley Sutton
3	R9	Thruxton Circuit (Hampshire)	4 May	(Australia) Sam Brabham	(United Kingdom) Ashley Sutton	(Australia) Sam Brabham	JTR	(United Kingdom) Ashley Sutton
4	R10	Oulton Park (Island Circuit, Cheshire)	7 June	(United Kingdom) Harrison Scott	(South Africa) Jayde Kruger	(United Kingdom) Harrison Scott	Falcon Motorsport	(United Kingdom) Ricky Collard
4	R11	Oulton Park (Island Circuit, Cheshire)	7 June		(South Africa) Jayde Kruger	(South Africa) Jayde Kruger	JTR	(United Kingdom) Chris Mealin
4	R12	Oulton Park (Island Circuit, Cheshire)	8 June	(South Africa) Jayde Kruger	(South Africa) Jayde Kruger	(South Africa) Jayde Kruger	JTR	(United Kingdom) Connor Mills
5	R13	Croft Circuit (North Yorkshire)	28 June	(United Kingdom) Harrison Scott	(South Africa) Jayde Kruger	(United Kingdom) Harrison Scott	Falcon Motorsport	(United Kingdom) Ashley Sutton
5	R14	Croft Circuit (North Yorkshire)	28 June		(United Kingdom) Ashley Sutton	(United Kingdom) Ashley Sutton	Jamun Racing	(United Kingdom) Ashley Sutton
5	R15	Croft Circuit (North Yorkshire)	29 June	(United Kingdom) Harrison Scott	(South Africa) Jayde Kruger	(United Kingdom) James Abbott	Radical Motorsport	(United Kingdom) Ashley Sutton
6	R16	Snetterton Motor Racing Circuit (300 Circuit, Norfolk)	2 August	(South Africa) Jayde Kruger	(United Kingdom) Ashley Sutton	(United Kingdom) Max Marshall	JTR	(United Kingdom) Ashley Sutton
6	R17	Snetterton Motor Racing Circuit (300 Circuit, Norfolk)	3 August		(United Kingdom) Ashley Sutton	(United Kingdom) Ashley Sutton	MBM Motorsport	(United Kingdom) Ashley Sutton
6	R18	Snetterton Motor Racing Circuit (300 Circuit, Norfolk)	3 August	(United Kingdom) Ashley Sutton	(South Africa) Jayde Kruger	(United Kingdom) Ashley Sutton	MBM Motorsport	(United Kingdom) Ashley Sutton
7	R19	Knockhill Racing Circuit (Fife)	23 August	(United Kingdom) Ashley Sutton	(United Kingdom) Ashley Sutton	(United Kingdom) Ashley Sutton	MBM Motorsport	(United Kingdom) Ashley Sutton
7	R20	Knockhill Racing Circuit (Fife)	24 August		(United Kingdom) Ashley Sutton	(South Africa) Jayde Kruger	JTR	(United Kingdom) Ricky Collard
7	R21	Knockhill Racing Circuit (Fife)	24 August	(South Africa) Jayde Kruger	(South Africa) Jayde Kruger	(South Africa) Jayde Kruger	JTR	(United Kingdom) Ashley Sutton
8	R22	Rockingham Motor Speedway (International Super Sports Car Circuit, Northamptonshire)	6 September	(South Africa) Jayde Kruger	(United Kingdom) Ashley Sutton	(South Africa) Jayde Kruger	JTR	(United Kingdom) Ashley Sutton
8	R23	Rockingham Motor Speedway (International Super Sports Car Circuit, Northamptonshire)	7 September		(United Kingdom) Max Marshall	(United Kingdom) Max Marshall	JTR	(United Kingdom) Ashley Sutton
8	R24	Rockingham Motor Speedway (International Super Sports Car Circuit, Northamptonshire)	7 September	(South Africa) Jayde Kruger	(South Africa) Jayde Kruger	(South Africa) Jayde Kruger	JTR	(United Kingdom) Louise Richardson
9	R25	Silverstone Circuit (National Circuit, Northamptonshire)	27 September	(South Africa) Jayde Kruger	(South Africa) Jayde Kruger	(South Africa) Jayde Kruger	JTR	(United Kingdom) Ashley Sutton
9	R26	Silverstone Circuit (National Circuit, Northamptonshire)	28 September		(South Africa) Jayde Kruger	(United Kingdom) Ashley Sutton	MBM Motorsport	(United Kingdom) Ashley Sutton
9	R27	Silverstone Circuit (National Circuit, Northamptonshire)	28 September	(South Africa) Jayde Kruger	(United Kingdom) Harrison Scott	(South Africa) Jayde Kruger	JTR	(United Kingdom) Ashley Sutton
10	R28	Brands Hatch (Grand Prix Circuit, Kent)	11 October	(United Kingdom) Ashley Sutton	(United Kingdom) Ashley Sutton	(United Kingdom) Harrison Scott	Falcon Motorsport	(United Kingdom) Ricky Collard
10	R29	Brands Hatch (Grand Prix Circuit, Kent)	12 October		(United Kingdom) Ashley Sutton	(South Africa) Jayde Kruger	JTR	(United Kingdom) Ashley Sutton
10	R30	Brands Hatch (Grand Prix Circuit, Kent)	12 October	(United Kingdom) Ashley Sutton	(United Kingdom) Ashley Sutton	(United Kingdom) Harrison Scott	Falcon Motorsport	(United Kingdom) Ashley Sutton

== Championship standings ==
=== Drivers' Championship ===
Pos	Driver	BHI			DON			THR			OUL			CRO			SNE			KNO			ROC			SIL			BHGP			Points
1	(South Africa) Jayde Kruger	1	6	1	1	6	1	Ret	6	2	2	1	1	6	5	5	6	4	2	4	1	1	1	Ret	1	1	3	1	4	1	8	717
2	(United Kingdom) Harrison Scott	2	2	4	3	1	Ret	2	3	7	1	2	2	1	3	3	2	3	4	2	3	3	3	3	3	2	8	2	1	Ret	1	711
3	(United Kingdom) Ashley Sutton	9	8	10				3	4	3	8	4	10	2	1	2	3	1	1	1	Ret	5	2	2	DNS	3	1	3	Ret	3	2	567
4	(Argentina) Juan Angel Rosso	8	7	2	5	3	3	5	1	5	3	Ret	3	3	4	4	7	7	6	6	5	4	10	9	7	5	5	Ret	3	7	4	561
5	(United Kingdom) Max Marshall	5	4	7	6	7	2	4	2	4	6	Ret	4	5	6	6	1	5	3	5	2	2	4	1	2	Ret	Ret	4	Ret	2	5	560
6	(United Kingdom) James Abbott	6	1	6	4	4	8	6	7	6	11	6	5	4	2	1	5	6	Ret	7	6	8	7	7	8	4	2	5	6	8	6	556
7	(United Kingdom) Ricky Collard	4	3	Ret	Ret	9	Ret	9	8	8	7	8	7	Ret	9	8	4	2	9	3	4	6	5	4	Ret	6	4	DNS	2	5	3	436
8	(United Kingdom) Chris Mealin	7	10	8	8	10	6	Ret	DNS	DNS	9	3	8	7	7	9	9	8	8	9	Ret	Ret	8	8	9	9	Ret	9	7	11	9	314
9	(United Kingdom) Louise Richardson	10	11	11										8	8	Ret	10	9	7	8	7	7	6	5	4	8	7	6	5	10	7	292
10	(Australia) Greg Holloway	11	13	14	12	13	9	11	12	12	12	10	Ret	9	10	11	11	10	10	10	8	9	9	10	10	12	10	12	9	12	12	268
11	(Australia) Sam Brabham	Ret	9	3	2	5	Ret	1	5	1	4	Ret	DNS																			186
12	(United Kingdom) Connor Mills	Ret	Ret	9	7	2	4	7	9	9	10	5	6	Ret	Ret	7																183
13	(United Kingdom) Michael O'Brien																8	Ret	5				Ret	Ret	5	7	6	8	8	4	8	146
14	(United Kingdom) Jack Barlow	3	5	5																									Ret	9	10	86
15	(United Kingdom) Clay Mitchell																						Ret	6	6	11	Ret	7	Ret	6	13	84
16	(Nigeria) Ovie Iroro				11	12	Ret	10	11	11																Ret	9	11	Ret	DNS	DNS	72
17	(United Kingdom) James Webb	13	14	13	10	11	7																									56
18	(United Kingdom) Connor Jupp										Ret	9	Ret	Ret	DNS	10																24
Guest drivers ineligible for points
	(United Kingdom) Andy Richardson										5	7	9																			0
	(United Kingdom) Bobby Thompson				9	8	5	8	10	10																						0
	(United Kingdom) Jessica Hawkins																									10	11	10				0
	(United Kingdom) Ben Constanduros	12	12	12																												0
Pos	Driver	BHI			DON			THR			OUL			CRO			SNE			KNO			ROC			SIL			BHGP			Points
