= 2019 24 Hours of Spa =

Automotive endurance race

Layout of the Circuit de Spa-Francorchamps

The 2019 Total Spa 24 Hours was the 72nd running of the Spa 24 Hours endurance race. It was also the fourth round of the 2019 Blancpain GT Series Endurance Cup and was held on 27 and 28 July at the Circuit de Spa-Francorchamps, Belgium.

The race was won by GPX Racing and drivers Kevin Estre, Michael Christensen and Richard Lietz. The trio's No. 20 Porsche 911 GT3 R finished ahead of Rowe Racing and their No. 998 Porsche 911 GT3 R driven by Nick Tandy, Frédéric Makowiecki and Patrick Pilet by only 3.347 seconds. Third place went to the #4 Mercedes-AMG Team Black Falcon Mercedes-AMG GT3 shared by Maro Engel, Yelmer Buurman and Luca Stolz.

== Entry list ==
The following drivers attended the 2019 24 Hours of Spa:

Team	Car	N°	Drivers	Class
(Japan) Good Smile Racing & Type-Moon Racing	Mercedes-AMG GT3	00	(Japan) Nobuteru Taniguchi	P
(Japan) Good Smile Racing & Type-Moon Racing	Mercedes-AMG GT3	00	(Japan) Tatsuya Kataoka	P
(Japan) Good Smile Racing & Type-Moon Racing	Mercedes-AMG GT3	00	(United Kingdom) Adam Christodoulou	P
(Belgium) Audi Sport Team WRT	Audi R8 LMS	1	(Netherlands) Robin Frijns	P
(Belgium) Audi Sport Team WRT	Audi R8 LMS	1	(Switzerland) Nico Müller	P
(Belgium) Audi Sport Team WRT	Audi R8 LMS	1	(Germany) Rene Rast	P
(Belgium) Audi Sport Team WRT	Audi R8 LMS	2	(Spain) Alex Riberas	P
(Belgium) Audi Sport Team WRT	Audi R8 LMS	2	(Germany) Frank Stippler	P
(Belgium) Audi Sport Team WRT	Audi R8 LMS	2	(Belgium) Dries Vanthoor	P
(Germany) Mercedes-AMG Team Black Falcon	Mercedes-AMG GT3	4	(Germany) Maro Engel	P
(Germany) Mercedes-AMG Team Black Falcon	Mercedes-AMG GT3	4	(Germany) Luca Stolz	P
(Germany) Mercedes-AMG Team Black Falcon	Mercedes-AMG GT3	4	(Netherlands) Yelmer Buurman	P
(Germany) Phoenix Racing	Audi R8 LMS	5	(United Kingdom) Finlay Hutchison	S
(Germany) Phoenix Racing	Audi R8 LMS	5	(Spain) Iván Pareras	S
(Germany) Phoenix Racing	Audi R8 LMS	5	(Germany) Kim-Luis Schramm	S
(Germany) Black Falcon	Mercedes-AMG GT3	6	(Germany) Patrick Assenheimer	S
(Germany) Black Falcon	Mercedes-AMG GT3	6	(Germany) Hubert Haupt	S
(Germany) Black Falcon	Mercedes-AMG GT3	6	(Italy) Gabriele Piana	S
(Germany) Black Falcon	Mercedes-AMG GT3	6	(Saudi Arabia) Abdulaziz Al Faisal	S
(Belgium) Boutsen Ginion	BMW M6 GT3	9	(Saudi Arabia) Karim Ojjeh	Am
(Belgium) Boutsen Ginion	BMW M6 GT3	9	(France) Marc Rostan	Am
(Belgium) Boutsen Ginion	BMW M6 GT3	9	(South Africa) Gennaro Bonafede	Am
(Belgium) Boutsen Ginion	BMW M6 GT3	9	(France) Erik Maris	Am
(Belgium) Belgian Audi Club Team WRT	Audi R8 LMS	10	(Netherlands) Rik Breukers	P
(Belgium) Belgian Audi Club Team WRT	Audi R8 LMS	10	(France) Norman Nato	P
(Belgium) Belgian Audi Club Team WRT	Audi R8 LMS	10	(Belgium) Charles Weerts	P
(Italy) Ombra Racing	Lamborghini Huracán GT3 (2019)	12	(Italy) Fabrizio Crestani	S
(Italy) Ombra Racing	Lamborghini Huracán GT3 (2019)	12	(Germany) Nicolas Pohler	S
(Italy) Ombra Racing	Lamborghini Huracán GT3 (2019)	12	(Belgium) Denis Dupont	S
(Italy) Ombra Racing	Lamborghini Huracán GT3 (2019)	12	(United States) Corey Lewis	S
(Czech Republic) Bohemia Energy racing with Scuderia Praha	Ferrari 488 GT3	14	(Czech Republic) Josef Král	PA
(Czech Republic) Bohemia Energy racing with Scuderia Praha	Ferrari 488 GT3	14	(Italy) Gabriele Lancieri	PA
(Czech Republic) Bohemia Energy racing with Scuderia Praha	Ferrari 488 GT3	14	(Italy) Matteo Malucelli	PA
(Czech Republic) Bohemia Energy racing with Scuderia Praha	Ferrari 488 GT3	14	(Czech Republic) Jiří Písařík	PA
(Hong Kong) Modena Motorsport	Porsche 911 GT3 R	16	(Switzerland) Mathias Beche	PA
(Hong Kong) Modena Motorsport	Porsche 911 GT3 R	16	(Hong Kong) Philippe Descombes	PA
(Hong Kong) Modena Motorsport	Porsche 911 GT3 R	16	(Hong Kong) John Shen	PA
(Hong Kong) Modena Motorsport	Porsche 911 GT3 R	16	(Denmark) Benny Simonsen	PA
(Belgium) Team WRT	Audi R8 LMS	17	(Australia) Shae Davies	S
(Belgium) Team WRT	Audi R8 LMS	17	(United Kingdom) Alex MacDowall	S
(Belgium) Team WRT	Audi R8 LMS	17	(France) Paul Petit	S
(Hong Kong) KCMG	Nissan GT-R Nismo GT3	18	(Switzerland) Alexandre Imperatori	P
(Hong Kong) KCMG	Nissan GT-R Nismo GT3	18	(United Kingdom) Oliver Jarvis	P
(Hong Kong) KCMG	Nissan GT-R Nismo GT3	18	(Italy) Edoardo Liberati	P
(Austria) GRT Grasser Racing Team	Lamborghini Huracán GT3 (2019)	19	(Switzerland) Lucas Mauron	S
(Austria) GRT Grasser Racing Team	Lamborghini Huracán GT3 (2019)	19	(France) Arno Santamato	S
(Austria) GRT Grasser Racing Team	Lamborghini Huracán GT3 (2019)	19	(Austria) Gerhard Tweraser	S
(Austria) GRT Grasser Racing Team	Lamborghini Huracán GT3 (2019)	19	(Italy) Andrea Amici	S
(United Arab Emirates) GPX Racing	Porsche 911 GT3 R	20	(France) Kévin Estre	P
(United Arab Emirates) GPX Racing	Porsche 911 GT3 R	20	(Denmark) Michael Christensen	P
(United Arab Emirates) GPX Racing	Porsche 911 GT3 R	20	(Austria) Richard Lietz	P
(Hong Kong) OpenRoad Racing	Porsche 911 GT3 R	21	(Hong Kong) Antares Au	Am
(Hong Kong) OpenRoad Racing	Porsche 911 GT3 R	21	(Canada) Remo Ruscitti	Am
(Hong Kong) OpenRoad Racing	Porsche 911 GT3 R	21	(Indonesia) Michael Soeryadjaya	Am
(Hong Kong) OpenRoad Racing	Porsche 911 GT3 R	21	(Hong Kong) Francis Tjia	Am
(United Kingdom) Jenson Team Rocket RJN	Honda NSX GT3	22	(Switzerland) Philipp Frommenwiler	S
(United Kingdom) Jenson Team Rocket RJN	Honda NSX GT3	22	(United States) Matt McMurry	S
(United Kingdom) Jenson Team Rocket RJN	Honda NSX GT3	22	(United Kingdom) Struan Moore	S
(United Kingdom) Jenson Team Rocket RJN	Honda NSX GT3	22	(Mexico) Ricárdo Sanchez	S
(France) Tech 1 Racing	Lexus RC F GT3	23	(France) Fabien Barthez	Am
(France) Tech 1 Racing	Lexus RC F GT3	23	(Belgium) Bernard Delhez	Am
(France) Tech 1 Racing	Lexus RC F GT3	23	(France) Éric Cayrolle	Am
(France) Tech 1 Racing	Lexus RC F GT3	23	(France) Timothé Buret	Am
(France) Audi Sport Team Saintéloc	Audi R8 LMS	25	(Germany) Christopher Haase	P
(France) Audi Sport Team Saintéloc	Audi R8 LMS	25	(Belgium) Frédéric Vervisch	P
(France) Audi Sport Team Saintéloc	Audi R8 LMS	25	(Germany) Markus Winkelhock	P
(France) Saintéloc Racing	Audi R8 LMS	26	(Belgium) Pierre-Yves Paque	S
(France) Saintéloc Racing	Audi R8 LMS	26	(France) Michael Blanchemain	S
(France) Saintéloc Racing	Audi R8 LMS	26	(France) Simon Gachet	S
(France) Saintéloc Racing	Audi R8 LMS	26	(France) Steven Palette	S
(Italy) Daiko Lazarus Racing	Lamborghini Huracán GT3 (2019)	27	(United Kingdom) Graham Davidso	Am
(Italy) Daiko Lazarus Racing	Lamborghini Huracán GT3 (2019)	27	(France) Sylvain Debs	Am
(Italy) Daiko Lazarus Racing	Lamborghini Huracán GT3 (2019)	27	(Spain) Fernando Navarrete	Am
(Italy) Daiko Lazarus Racing	Lamborghini Huracán GT3 (2019)	27	(United Kingdom) Immanuel Vinke	Am
(Italy) Raton Racing by Target	Lamborghini Huracán GT3 (2019)	29	(Italy) Stefano Costantini	Am
(Italy) Raton Racing by Target	Lamborghini Huracán GT3 (2019)	29	(Spain) Toni Forné	Am
(Italy) Raton Racing by Target	Lamborghini Huracán GT3 (2019)	29	(Switzerland) Christoph Lenz	Am
(Italy) Raton Racing by Target	Lamborghini Huracán GT3 (2019)	29	(Italy) Alberto Di Folco	Am
(Italy) Honda Team Motul	Honda NSX GT3	30	(Belgium) Bertrand Baguette	P
(Italy) Honda Team Motul	Honda NSX GT3	30	(Germany) Mario Farnbacher	P
(Italy) Honda Team Motul	Honda NSX GT3	30	(Netherlands) Renger van der Zande	P
(United Kingdom) Team Parker Racing	Bentley Continental GT3	31	(United Kingdom) Derek Pierce	PA
(United Kingdom) Team Parker Racing	Bentley Continental GT3	31	(United Kingdom) Glynn Geddie	PA
(United Kingdom) Team Parker Racing	Bentley Continental GT3	31	(United Kingdom) Andy Meyrick	PA
(United Kingdom) Team Parker Racing	Bentley Continental GT3	31	(United Kingdom) Ryan Ratcliffe	PA
(Germany) Rinaldi Racing	Ferrari 488 GT3	33	(Germany) Christian Hook	Am
(Germany) Rinaldi Racing	Ferrari 488 GT3	33	(Germany) Manuel Lauck	Am
(Germany) Rinaldi Racing	Ferrari 488 GT3	33	(Germany) Alexander Mattschull	Am
(Germany) Rinaldi Racing	Ferrari 488 GT3	33	(Germany) Hendrik Still	Am
(Germany) Walkenhorst Motorsport	BMW M6 GT3	34	(Netherlands) Nick Catsburg	P
(Germany) Walkenhorst Motorsport	BMW M6 GT3	34	(Denmark) Mikkel Jensen	P
(Germany) Walkenhorst Motorsport	BMW M6 GT3	34	(Norway) Christian Krognes	P
(Hong Kong) KCMG	Nissan GT-R Nismo GT3	35	(Japan) Katsumasa Chiyo	P
(Hong Kong) KCMG	Nissan GT-R Nismo GT3	35	(Japan) Tsugio Matsuda	P
(Hong Kong) KCMG	Nissan GT-R Nismo GT3	35	(Australia) Josh Burdon	P
(Germany) Walkenhorst Motorsport	BMW M6 GT3	36	(Norway) Anders Buchardt	Am
(Germany) Walkenhorst Motorsport	BMW M6 GT3	36	(United Kingdom) David Pittard	Am
(Germany) Walkenhorst Motorsport	BMW M6 GT3	36	(Germany) Henry Walkenhorst	Am
(Germany) Walkenhorst Motorsport	BMW M6 GT3	36	(United States) Don Yount	Am
(France) 3Y Technology	BMW M6 GT3	37	(France) Philippe Bourgeois	Am
(France) 3Y Technology	BMW M6 GT3	37	(France) Jean-Paul Buffin	Am
(France) 3Y Technology	BMW M6 GT3	37	(France) Philippe Haezebrouck	Am
(France) 3Y Technology	BMW M6 GT3	37	(France) Gilles Vannelet	Am
(Germany) BMW Team Schnitzer	BMW M6 GT3	42	(Brazil) Augusto Farfus	P
(Germany) BMW Team Schnitzer	BMW M6 GT3	42	(United States) John Edwards	P
(Germany) BMW Team Schnitzer	BMW M6 GT3	42	(Germany) Martin Tomczyk	P
(United Kingdom) Strakka Racing	Mercedes-AMG GT3	43	(Italy) David Fumanelli	PA
(United Kingdom) Strakka Racing	Mercedes-AMG GT3	43	(United Kingdom) Jack Hawksworth	PA
(United Kingdom) Strakka Racing	Mercedes-AMG GT3	43	(United States) Richard Heistand	PA
(United Kingdom) Strakka Racing	Mercedes-AMG GT3	43	(Denmark) Christina Nielsen	PA
(United Kingdom) Mercedes-AMG Team Strakka Racing	Mercedes-AMG GT3	44	(United Kingdom) Gary Paffett	P
(United Kingdom) Mercedes-AMG Team Strakka Racing	Mercedes-AMG GT3	44	(France) Tristan Vautier	P
(United Kingdom) Mercedes-AMG Team Strakka Racing	Mercedes-AMG GT3	44	(United Kingdom) Lewis Williamson	P
(Belgium) 1969 Tribute	Porsche 911 GT3 Cup MR	50	(Belgium) Loïc Deman	INV
(Belgium) 1969 Tribute	Porsche 911 GT3 Cup MR	50	(Belgium) Angélique Detavernier	INV
(Belgium) 1969 Tribute	Porsche 911 GT3 Cup MR	50	(Belgium) Marc Duez	INV
(Belgium) 1969 Tribute	Porsche 911 GT3 Cup MR	50	(Belgium) Stéphane Lémeret	INV
(Belgium) AF Corse	Ferrari 488 GT3	51	(United Kingdom) Sam Bird	P
(Belgium) AF Corse	Ferrari 488 GT3	51	(United Kingdom) James Calado	P
(Belgium) AF Corse	Ferrari 488 GT3	51	(Italy) Alessandro Pier Guidi	P
(Belgium) AF Corse	Ferrari 488 GT3	52	(Italy) Andrea Bertolini	PA
(Belgium) AF Corse	Ferrari 488 GT3	52	(Netherlands) Niek Hommerson	PA
(Belgium) AF Corse	Ferrari 488 GT3	52	(Belgium) Louis Machiels	PA
(Belgium) AF Corse	Ferrari 488 GT3	52	(Finland) Toni Vilander	PA
(Italy) Dinamic Motorsport	Porsche 911 GT3 R	54	(Kuwait) Zaid Ashkanani	P
(Italy) Dinamic Motorsport	Porsche 911 GT3 R	54	(Austria) Klaus Bachler	P
(Italy) Dinamic Motorsport	Porsche 911 GT3 R	54	(Italy) Andrea Rizzoli	P
(Germany) Attempto Racing	Audi R8 LMS	55	(Italy) Mattia Drudi	S
(Germany) Attempto Racing	Audi R8 LMS	55	(Netherlands) Pieter Schothorst	S
(Germany) Attempto Racing	Audi R8 LMS	55	(Netherlands) Steijn Schothorst	S
(United Kingdom) Garage 59	Aston Martin Vantage AMR GT3	59	(United Kingdom) Jonny Adam	P
(United Kingdom) Garage 59	Aston Martin Vantage AMR GT3	59	(France) Côme Ledogar	P
(United Kingdom) Garage 59	Aston Martin Vantage AMR GT3	59	(United Kingdom) Andrew Watson	P
(Switzerland) R-Motorsport	Aston Martin Vantage AMR GT3	62	(Belgium) Maxime Martin	P
(Switzerland) R-Motorsport	Aston Martin Vantage AMR GT3	62	(United Kingdom) Matt Parry	P
(Switzerland) R-Motorsport	Aston Martin Vantage AMR GT3	62	(France) Matthieu Vaxivière	P
(Switzerland) R-Motorsport	Aston Martin Vantage AMR GT3	76	(United Kingdom) Jake Dennis	P
(Switzerland) R-Motorsport	Aston Martin Vantage AMR GT3	76	(United Kingdom) Alex Lynn	P
(Switzerland) R-Motorsport	Aston Martin Vantage AMR GT3	76	(Germany) Marvin Kirchhöfer	P
(Switzerland) R-Motorsport	Aston Martin Vantage AMR GT3	762	(United Kingdom) Ricky Collard	S
(Switzerland) R-Motorsport	Aston Martin Vantage AMR GT3	762	(Austria) Ferdinand Habsburg	S
(Switzerland) R-Motorsport	Aston Martin Vantage AMR GT3	762	(Switzerland) Hugo de Sadeleer	S
(Switzerland) R-Motorsport	Aston Martin Vantage AMR GT3	762	(Finland) Aaro Vainio	S
(Austria) GRT Grasser Racing Team	Lamborghini Huracán GT3 (2019)	63	(Italy) Mirko Bortolotti	P
(Austria) GRT Grasser Racing Team	Lamborghini Huracán GT3 (2019)	63	(Germany) Christian Engelhart	P
(Austria) GRT Grasser Racing Team	Lamborghini Huracán GT3 (2019)	63	(Switzerland) Rolf Ineichen	P
(Germany) Attempto Racing	Audi R8 LMS	66	(South Africa) Kelvin van der Linde	P
(Germany) Attempto Racing	Audi R8 LMS	66	(Austria) Clemens Schmid	P
(Germany) Attempto Racing	Audi R8 LMS	66	(Netherlands) Milan Dontje	P
(Russia) SMP Racing	Ferrari 488 GT3	72	(Italy) Davide Rigon	P
(Russia) SMP Racing	Ferrari 488 GT3	72	(Russia) Mikhail Aleshin	P
(Russia) SMP Racing	Ferrari 488 GT3	72	(Spain) Miguel Molina	P
(United Kingdom) Ram Racing	Mercedes-AMG GT3	74	(United Kingdom) Tom Onslow-Cole	PA
(United Kingdom) Ram Racing	Mercedes-AMG GT3	74	(Netherlands) Remon Vos	PA
(United Kingdom) Ram Racing	Mercedes-AMG GT3	74	(United Kingdom) Darren Burke	PA
(United Kingdom) Ram Racing	Mercedes-AMG GT3	74	(Netherlands) Christiaan Frankenhout	PA
(United Kingdom) Barwell Motorsport	Lamborghini Huracán GT3 (2019)	77	(Switzerland) Adrian Amstutz	Am
(United Kingdom) Barwell Motorsport	Lamborghini Huracán GT3 (2019)	77	(Russia) Leo Machitski	Am
(United Kingdom) Barwell Motorsport	Lamborghini Huracán GT3 (2019)	77	(United Kingdom) Richard Abra	Am
(United Kingdom) Barwell Motorsport	Lamborghini Huracán GT3 (2019)	77	(Finland) Patrick Kujala	Am
(United Kingdom) Barwell Motorsport	Lamborghini Huracán GT3 (2019)	78	(United Kingdom) Sandy Mitchell	S
(United Kingdom) Barwell Motorsport	Lamborghini Huracán GT3 (2019)	78	(United Kingdom) James Pull	S
(United Kingdom) Barwell Motorsport	Lamborghini Huracán GT3 (2019)	78	(United Kingdom) Jordan Witt	S
Audi Sport R8 LMS Cup	Audi R8 LMS	80	(Indonesia) Andrew Haryanto	Am
Audi Sport R8 LMS Cup	Audi R8 LMS	80	(Chinese Taipei) Jeffrey Lee	Am
Audi Sport R8 LMS Cup	Audi R8 LMS	80	(Australia) Yasser Shahin	Am
Audi Sport R8 LMS Cup	Audi R8 LMS	80	(China) Jingzu Sun	Am
(France) Mercedes-AMG Team AKKA ASP	Mercedes-AMG GT3	88	(Monaco) Vincent Abril	P
(France) Mercedes-AMG Team AKKA ASP	Mercedes-AMG GT3	88	(Italy) Raffaele Marciello	P
(France) Mercedes-AMG Team AKKA ASP	Mercedes-AMG GT3	88	(Germany) Fabian Schiller	P
(France) AKKA ASP Team	Mercedes-AMG GT3	90	(Germany) Nico Bastian	S
(France) AKKA ASP Team	Mercedes-AMG GT3	90	(Russia) Timur Boguslavskiy	S
(France) AKKA ASP Team	Mercedes-AMG GT3	90	(Brazil) Felipe Fraga	S
(Germany) Herberth Motorsport	Porsche 911 GT3 R	91	(Switzerland) Daniel Allemann	PA
(Germany) Herberth Motorsport	Porsche 911 GT3 R	91	(Germany) Ralf Bohn	PA
(Germany) Herberth Motorsport	Porsche 911 GT3 R	91	(Germany) Alfred Renauer	PA
(Germany) Herberth Motorsport	Porsche 911 GT3 R	91	(Germany) Robert Renauer	PA
(United Kingdom) Tempesta Racing	Ferrari 488 GT3	93	(United Kingdom) Chris Froggatt	PA
(United Kingdom) Tempesta Racing	Ferrari 488 GT3	93	(Hong Kong) Jonathan Hui	PA
(United Kingdom) Tempesta Racing	Ferrari 488 GT3	93	(Italy) Edward Cheever	PA
(United Kingdom) Tempesta Racing	Ferrari 488 GT3	93	(Italy) Giancarlo Fisichella	PA
Oman Racing with TF Sport	Aston Martin Vantage AMR GT3	97	(Republic of Ireland) Charlie Eastwood	PA
Oman Racing with TF Sport	Aston Martin Vantage AMR GT3	97	(Oman) Ahmad Al Harthy	PA
Oman Racing with TF Sport	Aston Martin Vantage AMR GT3	97	(Turkey) Salih Yoluç	PA
Oman Racing with TF Sport	Aston Martin Vantage AMR GT3	97	(Denmark) Nicki Thiim	PA
(Germany) Rowe Racing	Porsche 911 GT3 R	98	(France) Romain Dumas	P
(Germany) Rowe Racing	Porsche 911 GT3 R	98	(France) Mathieu Jaminet	P
(Germany) Rowe Racing	Porsche 911 GT3 R	98	(Germany) Sven Müller	P
(Germany) Rowe Racing	Porsche 911 GT3 R	99	(Australia) Matt Campbell	P
(Germany) Rowe Racing	Porsche 911 GT3 R	99	(Norway) Dennis Olsen	P
(Germany) Rowe Racing	Porsche 911 GT3 R	99	(Germany) Dirk Werner	P
(United Kingdom) Bentley Team M-Sport	Bentley Continental GT3	107	(France) Jules Gounon	P
(United Kingdom) Bentley Team M-Sport	Bentley Continental GT3	107	(United Kingdom) Steven Kane	P
(United Kingdom) Bentley Team M-Sport	Bentley Continental GT3	107	(South Africa) Jordan Pepper	P
(United Kingdom) Bentley Team M-Sport	Bentley Continental GT3	108	(Belgium) Maxime Soulet	P
(United Kingdom) Bentley Team M-Sport	Bentley Continental GT3	108	(United Kingdom) Alex Buncombe	P
(United Kingdom) Bentley Team M-Sport	Bentley Continental GT3	108	(Finland) Markus Palttala	P
(United Kingdom) M-Sport Team Bentley	Bentley Continental GT3	109	(Brazil) Rodrigo Baptista	P
(United Kingdom) M-Sport Team Bentley	Bentley Continental GT3	109	(United Kingdom) Callum MacLeod	P
(United Kingdom) M-Sport Team Bentley	Bentley Continental GT3	109	(United Kingdom) Seb Morris	P
(United Kingdom) M-Sport Team Bentley	Bentley Continental GT3	110	(Brazil) Pipo Derani	P
(United Kingdom) M-Sport Team Bentley	Bentley Continental GT3	110	(Spain) Lucas Ordóñez	P
(United Kingdom) M-Sport Team Bentley	Bentley Continental GT3	110	(Spain) Andy Soucek	P
(Germany) KÜS Team75 Bernhard	Porsche 911 GT3 R	117	(Belgium) Laurens Vanthoor	P
(Germany) KÜS Team75 Bernhard	Porsche 911 GT3 R	117	(Germany) Timo Bernhard	P
(Germany) KÜS Team75 Bernhard	Porsche 911 GT3 R	117	(New Zealand) Earl Bamber	P
(Germany) Montaplast by Land-Motorsport	Audi R8 LMS	129	(United Kingdom) Jamie Green	P
(Germany) Montaplast by Land-Motorsport	Audi R8 LMS	129	(Germany) Christopher Mies	P
(Germany) Montaplast by Land-Motorsport	Audi R8 LMS	129	(Switzerland) Ricardo Feller	P
(Italy) Scuderia Villorba Corse	Mercedes-AMG GT3	133	(Switzerland) Mauro Calamia	PA
(Italy) Scuderia Villorba Corse	Mercedes-AMG GT3	133	(Switzerland) Ivan Jacoma	PA
(Italy) Scuderia Villorba Corse	Mercedes-AMG GT3	133	(Switzerland) Stefano Monaco	PA
(Italy) Scuderia Villorba Corse	Mercedes-AMG GT3	133	(Switzerland) Roberto Pampanini	PA
(United Kingdom) Garage 59	Aston Martin Vantage AMR GT3	188	(United Kingdom) Chris Goodwin	Am
(United Kingdom) Garage 59	Aston Martin Vantage AMR GT3	188	(Sweden) Alexander West	Am
(United Kingdom) Garage 59	Aston Martin Vantage AMR GT3	188	(United Kingdom) Chris Harris	Am
(United Kingdom) Garage 59	Aston Martin Vantage AMR GT3	188	(United Kingdom) Ross Gunn	Am
(Chinese Taipei) HubAuto Corsa	Ferrari 488 GT3	227	(New Zealand) Nick Cassidy	P
(Chinese Taipei) HubAuto Corsa	Ferrari 488 GT3	227	(Australia) Nick Foster	P
(Chinese Taipei) HubAuto Corsa	Ferrari 488 GT3	227	(Brazil) Daniel Serra	P
(Germany) Rinaldi Racing	Ferrari 488 GT3	333	(Russia) Denis Bulatov	S
(Germany) Rinaldi Racing	Ferrari 488 GT3	333	(South Africa) David Perel	S
(Germany) Rinaldi Racing	Ferrari 488 GT3	333	(Russia) Rinat Salikhov	S
(Germany) Rinaldi Racing	Ferrari 488 GT3	333	(Netherlands) Indy Dontje	S
(Austria) HB Racing	Ferrari 488 GT3	444	(Austria) Jens Liebhauser	Am
(Austria) HB Racing	Ferrari 488 GT3	444	(Germany) Florian Scholze	Am
(Austria) HB Racing	Ferrari 488 GT3	444	(France) Thomas Neubauer	Am
(Austria) HB Racing	Ferrari 488 GT3	444	(Germany) Philipp Wlazik	Am
(Germany) Rinaldi Racing	Ferrari 488 GT3	488	(Argentina) José Manuel Balbiani	Am
(Germany) Rinaldi Racing	Ferrari 488 GT3	488	(Australia) Martin Berry	Am
(Germany) Rinaldi Racing	Ferrari 488 GT3	488	(Germany) Pierre Ehret	Am
(Germany) Rinaldi Racing	Ferrari 488 GT3	488	(Finland) Rory Penttinen	Am
(China) Orange 1 FFF Racing Team	Lamborghini Huracán GT3 (2019)	519	(United Kingdom) Phil Keen	P
(China) Orange 1 FFF Racing Team	Lamborghini Huracán GT3 (2019)	519	(France) Franck Perera	P
(China) Orange 1 FFF Racing Team	Lamborghini Huracán GT3 (2019)	519	(Italy) Giovanni Venturini	P
(China) Orange 1 FFF Racing Team	Lamborghini Huracán GT3 (2019)	555	(Italy) Michele Beretta	S
(China) Orange 1 FFF Racing Team	Lamborghini Huracán GT3 (2019)	555	(Mexico) Diego Menchaca	S
(China) Orange 1 FFF Racing Team	Lamborghini Huracán GT3 (2019)	555	(United States) Taylor Proto	S
(China) Orange 1 FFF Racing Team	Lamborghini Huracán GT3 (2019)	555	(Italy) Giacomo Altoè	S
(China) Orange 1 FFF Racing Team	Lamborghini Huracán GT3 (2019)	563	(Italy) Andrea Caldarelli	P
(China) Orange 1 FFF Racing Team	Lamborghini Huracán GT3 (2019)	563	(Denmark) Dennis Lind	P
(China) Orange 1 FFF Racing Team	Lamborghini Huracán GT3 (2019)	563	(Switzerland) Marco Mapelli	P
(Germany) Rowe Racing	Porsche 911 GT3 R	998	(France) Frédéric Makowiecki	P
(Germany) Rowe Racing	Porsche 911 GT3 R	998	(France) Patrick Pilet	P
(Germany) Rowe Racing	Porsche 911 GT3 R	998	(United Kingdom) Nick Tandy	P
(Hong Kong) Mercedes-AMG Team GruppeM	Mercedes-AMG GT3	999	(Austria) Lucas Auer	P
(Hong Kong) Mercedes-AMG Team GruppeM	Mercedes-AMG GT3	999	(Germany) Maximilian Buhk	P
(Hong Kong) Mercedes-AMG Team GruppeM	Mercedes-AMG GT3	999	(Germany) Maximilian Götz	P

Icon	Class
P	Pro Cup
S	Silver Cup
PA	Pro-Am Cup
Am	Am Cup
INV	Invitational

== Qualifying ==
=== Super Pole ===
These were the 20 fastest cars in qualifying:

Pos	N°	Driver	Team	Car	Time	Dif
1	4	(Germany) Maro Engel	Mercedes-AMG Team Black Falcon	Mercedes-AMG GT3	2:18.588	
2	117	(Belgium) Laurens Vanthoor	KÜS Team75 Benhard	Porsche 911 GT3 R	2:18.605	+0.017
3	72	(Italy) Davide Rigon	SMP Racing	Ferrari 488 GT3	2:18.806	+0.218
4	998	(United Kingdom) Nick Tandy	Rowe Racing	Porsche 911 GT3 R	2:18.822	+0.234
5	227	(Brazil) Daniel Serra	HubAuto Corsa	Ferrari 488 GT3	2:18.854	+0.266
6	2	(Belgium) Dries Vanthoor	Audi Sport Team WRT	Audi R8 LMS	2:18.923	+0.335
7	1	(Switzerland) Nico Müller	Audi Sport Team WRT	Audi R8 LMS	2:18.994	+0.406
8	55	(Italy) Mattia Drudi	Attempto Racing	Audi R8 LMS	2:19.007	+0.419
9	999	(Germany) Maximilian Buhk	Mercedes-AMG Team GruppeM Racing	Mercedes-AMG GT3	2:19.013	+0.425
10	98	(France) Mathieu Jaminet	Rowe Racing	Porsche 911 GT3 R	2:19.027	+0.439
11	20	(France) Kevin Estre	GPX Racing	Porsche 911 GT3 R	2:19.067	+0.479
12	99	(Norway) Dennis Olsen	Rowe Racing	Porsche 911 GT3 R	2:19.259	+0.671
13	76	(United Kingdom) Jake Dennis	R-Motorsport	Aston Martin Vantage AMR GT3	2:19.326	+0.738
14	62	(Belgium) Maxime Martin	R-Motorsport	Aston Martin Vantage AMR GT3	2:19.341	+0.753
15	44	(United Kingdom) Gary Paffett	Mercedes-AMG Team Strakka Racing	Mercedes-AMG GT3	2:19.501	+0.913
16	54	(Germany) Klaus Bachler	Dinamic Motorsport	Porsche 911 GT3 R	2:19.881	+1.293
17	129	(United Kingdom) Jamie Green	Montaplast by Land-Motorsport	Audi R8 LMS	2:19.894	+1.306
18	59	(United Kingdom) Andrew Watson	Garage 59	Aston Martin Vantage AMR GT3	2:20.470	+1.882
19	563	(Denmark) Dennis Lind	Orange 1 FFF Racing Team	Lamborghini Huracán GT3 (2019)	2:21.397^{1}	+2.809
20	35	(Japan) Katsumasa Chiyo	KCMG	Nissan GT-R Nismo GT3	2:26.921^{1}	+8.333

Notes

- ^1 - Penalised for not leaving pits at the correct time.

== Race ==
=== Race result ===
Pos	Class	No	Team	Drivers	Car	Laps	Time/Reason
1	P	20	(United Arab Emirates) GPX Racing	(Denmark) Michael Christensen (Austria) Richard Lietz (France) Kévin Estre	Porsche 911 GT3 R	363	24:00:17.511
2	P	998	(Germany) Rowe Racing	(France) Frédéric Makowiecki (France) Patrick Pilet (United Kingdom) Nick Tandy	Porsche 911 GT3 R	363	+3.347
3	P	4	(Germany) Mercedes-AMG Team Black Falcon	(Germany) Maro Engel (Netherlands) Yelmer Buurman (Germany) Luca Stolz	Mercedes-AMG GT3	363	+17.945
4	P	25	(France) Audi Sport Team Saintéloc	(Germany) Christopher Haase (Belgium) Frédéric Vervisch (Germany) Markus Winkelhock	Audi R8 LMS	363	+22.425
5	P	98	(Germany) Rowe Racing	(France) Romain Dumas (Germany) Sven Müller (France) Mathieu Jaminet	Porsche 911 GT3 R	362	+1 Lap
6	P	30	(Italy) Honda Team Motul	(Belgium) Bertrand Baguette (Netherlands) Renger van der Zande (Germany) Mario Farnbacher	Honda NSX GT3	362	+1 Lap
7	P	99	(Germany) Rowe Racing	(Australia) Matt Campbell (Norway) Dennis Olsen (Germany) Dirk Werner	Porsche 911 GT3 R	362	+1 Lap
8	P	563	(China) Orange 1 FFF Racing Team	(Italy) Andrea Caldarelli (Switzerland) Marco Mapelli (Denmark) Dennis Lind	Lamborghini Huracán GT3 (2019)	362	+1 Lap
9	P	117	(Germany) KÜS Team75 Bernhard	(New Zealand) Earl Bamber (Belgium) Laurens Vanthoor (Germany) Timo Bernhard	Porsche 911 GT3 R	362	+1 Lap
10	P	999	(Hong Kong) Mercedes-AMG Team GruppeM Racing	(Austria) Lucas Auer (Germany) Maximilian Buhk (Germany) Maximilian Götz	Mercedes-AMG GT3	362	+1 Lap
11	P	34	(Germany) Walkenhorst Motorsport	(Denmark) Mikkel Jensen (Netherlands) Nick Catsburg (Norway) Christian Krognes	BMW M6 GT3	362	+1 Lap
12	P	10	(Belgium) Belgian Audi Club Team WRT	(France) Norman Nato (Netherlands) Rik Breukers (Belgium) Charles Weerts	Audi R8 LMS	362	+1 Lap
13	P	88	(France) Mercedes-AMG Team AKKA ASP	(Italy) Raffaele Marciello (Germany) Fabian Schiller (Monaco) Vincent Abril	Mercedes-AMG GT3	361	+2 Laps
14	P	129	(Germany) Montaplast by Land-Motorsport	(Germany) Christopher Mies (United Kingdom) Jamie Green (Switzerland) Ricardo Feller	Audi R8 LMS	361	+2 Laps
15	S	78	(United Kingdom) Barwell Motorsport	(United Kingdom) Sandy Mitchell (United Kingdom) James Pull (United Kingdom) Jordan Witt	Lamborghini Huracán GT3 (2019)	361	+2 Lap
16	P	63	(Austria) GRT Grasser Racing Team	(Italy) Mirko Bortolotti (Germany) Christian Engelhart (Switzerland) Rolf Ineichen	Lamborghini Huracán GT3 (2019)	361	+2 Lap
17	S	90	(France) AKKA ASP Team	(Brazil) Felipe Fraga (Russia) Timur Boguslavskiy (Germany) Nico Bastian	Mercedes-AMG GT3	361	+2 Lap
18	P	18	(Hong Kong) KCMG	(United Kingdom) Oliver Jarvis (Switzerland) Alexandre Imperatori (Italy) Edoardo Liberati	Nissan GT-R Nismo GT3	360	+3 Lap
19	P	76	(Switzerland) R-Motorsport	(Germany) Marvin Kirchhöfer (United Kingdom) Alex Lynn (United Kingdom) Jake Dennis	Aston Martin Vantage AMR GT3	360	+3 Lap
20	P	44	(United Kingdom) Mercedes-AMG Team Strakka Racing	(United Kingdom) Gary Paffett (France) Tristan Vautier (United Kingdom) Lewis Williamson	Mercedes-AMG GT3	360	+3 Lap
21	P	519	(China) Orange 1 FFF Racing Team	(United Kingdom) Phil Keen (France) Franck Perera (Italy) Giovanni Venturini	Lamborghini Huracán GT3 (2019)	360	+3 Lap
22	PA	97	Oman Racing With TF Sport	(Republic of Ireland) Charlie Eastwood (Oman) Ahmad Al Harthy (Turkey) Salih Yoluç (Denmark) Nicki Thiim	Aston Martin Vantage AMR GT3	359	+4 Lap
23	P	1	(Belgium) Audi Sport Team WRT	(Netherlands) Robin Frijns (Switzerland) Nico Müller (Germany) Rene Rast	Audi R8 LMS	358	+5 Laps
24	S	6	(Germany) Black Falcon	(Germany) Patrick Assenheimer (Germany) Hubert Haupt (Italy) Gabriele Piana (Saudi Arabia) Abdulaziz Al Faisal	Mercedes-AMG GT3	358	+5 Laps
25	P	2	(Belgium) Audi Sport Team WRT	(Belgium) Dries Vanthoor (Germany) Frank Stippler (Spain) Alex Riberas	Audi R8 LMS	358	+5 Lap
26	PA	74	(United Kingdom) Ram Racing	(United Kingdom) Tom Onslow-Cole (Netherlands) Remon Vos (United Kingdom) Darren Burke (Netherlands) Christiaan Frankenhout	Mercedes-AMG GT3	358	+5 Lap
27	P	54	(Italy) Dinamic Motorsport	(Austria) Klaus Bachler (Kuwait) Zaid Ashkanani (Italy) Andrea Rizzoli	Porsche 911 GT3 R	357	+6 Lap
28	Am	33	(Germany) Rinaldi Racing	(Germany) Christian Hook (Germany) Manuel Lauck (Germany) Alexander Mattschull (Germany) Hendrik Still	Ferrari 488 GT3	357	+6 Lap
29	P	110	(United Kingdom) M-Sport Team Bentley	(Brazil) Pipo Derani (United Kingdom) Andy Soucek (Spain) Lucas Ordóñez	Bentley Continental GT3	357	+6 Lap
30	P	66	(Germany) Attempto Racing	(Austria) Clemens Schmid (South Africa) Kelvin van der Linde (Netherlands) Milan Dontje	Audi R8 LMS	357	+6 Lap
31	S	22	(United Kingdom) Jenson Team Rocket RJN	(Switzerland) Philipp Frommenwiler (United States) Matt McMurry (United Kingdom) Struan Moore (Mexico) Ricárdo Sanchez	Honda NSX GT3	357	+6 Lap
32	PA	43	(United Kingdom) Strakka Racing	(Italy) David Fumanelli (United Kingdom) Jack Hawksworth (United States) Richard Heistand (Denmark) Christina Nielsen	Mercedes-AMG GT3	357	+6 Laps
33	S	19	(Austria) GRT Grasser Racing Team	(Switzerland) Lucas Mauron (France) Arno Santamato (Austria) Gerhard Tweraser (Italy) Andrea Amici	Lamborghini Huracán GT3 (2019)	356	+7 Laps
34	S	17	(Belgium) Team WRT	(Australia) Shae Davies (United Kingdom) Alex MacDowall (France) Paul Petit	Audi R8 LMS	356	+7 Laps
35	Am	77	(United Kingdom) Barwell Motorsport	(Switzerland) Adrian Amstutz (Russia) Leo Machitski (United Kingdom) Richard Abra (Finland) Patrick Kujala	Lamborghini Huracán GT3 (2019)	356	+7 Lap
36	Am	29	(Italy) Raton Racing by Target	(Italy) Stefano Costantini (Spain) Toni Forné (Switzerland) Christoph Lenz (Italy) Alberto Di Folco	Lamborghini Huracán GT3 (2019)	355	+8 Lap
37	S	12	(Italy) Ombra Racing	(Italy) Fabrizio Crestani (Germany) Nicolas Pohler (Belgium) Denis Dupont (United States) Corey Lewis	Lamborghini Huracán GT3 (2019)	353	+10 Lap
38	Am	444	(Germany) HB Racing	(Germany) Jens Liebhauser (France) Thomas Neubauer (Germany) Florian Scholze (Germany) Philipp Wlazik	Ferrari 488 GT3	353	+10 Laps
39	P	35	(Hong Kong) KCMG	(Japan) Katsumasa Chiyo (Japan) Tsugio Matsuda (Australia) Josh Burdon	Nissan GT-R Nismo GT3	352	+11 Lap
40	PA	93	(United Kingdom) Tempesta Racing	(United Kingdom) Chris Froggatt (Hong Kong) Jonathan Hui (Italy) Edward Cheever (Italy) Giancarlo Fisichella	Ferrari 488 GT3	351	+12 Lap
41	Am	488	(Germany) Rinaldi Racing	(Argentina) José Manuel Balbiani (Singapore) Martin Berry (Germany) Pierre Ehret (Finland) Rory Penttinen	Ferrari 488 GT3	350	+13 Lap
42	PA	16	(Hong Kong) Modena Motorsport	(Switzerland) Mathias Beche (Hong Kong) Philippe Descombes (Hong Kong) John Shen (Denmark) Benny Simonsen	Porsche 911 GT3 R	348	+15 Laps
43	PA	133	(Italy) Scuderia Villorba Corse	(Switzerland) Mauro Calamia (Switzerland) Ivan Jacoma (Switzerland) Stefano Monaco (Switzerland) Roberto Pampanini	Mercedes-AMG GT3	347	+16 Laps
44	Am	23	(France) Tech 1 Racing	(France) Fabien Barthez (Belgium) Bernard Delhez (France) Éric Cayrolle (France) Timothé Buret	Lexus RC F GT3	345	+18 Laps
45	Am	21	(Hong Kong) OpenRoad Racing	(Hong Kong) Antares Au (Canada) Remo Ruscitti (Indonesia) Michael Soeryadjaya (Hong Kong) Francis Tjia	Porsche 911 GT3 R	343	+20 Lap
46	Am	9	(Belgium) Boutsen Ginion	(Saudi Arabia) Karim Ojjeh (France) Marc Rostan (South Africa) Gennaro Bonafede (France) Erik Maris	BMW M6 GT3	339	+24 Lap
47	Am	188	(United Kingdom) Garage 59	(United Kingdom) Chris Goodwin (Sweden) Alexander West (United Kingdom) Chris Harris (United Kingdom) Ross Gunn	Aston Martin Vantage AMR GT3	339	+24 Lap
48	PA	26	(France) Saintéloc Racing	(Belgium) Pierre Yves-Paque (France) Michael Blanchemain (France) Simon Gachet (France) Steven Palette	Audi R8 LMS	338	+25 Laps
49	P	107	(United Kingdom) Bentley Team M-Sport	(South Africa) Jordan Pepper (United Kingdom) Steven Kane (France) Jules Gounon	Bentley Continental GT3	321	+42 Lap
50	Am	80	(China) Audi Sport R8 LMS CUP	(Indonesia) Andrew Haryanto (Chinese Taipei) Jeffrey Lee (Australia) Yasser Shahin (China) Jingzu Sun	Audi R8 LMS	303	+60 Lap
51	P	72	(Russia) SMP Racing	(Spain) Miguel Molina (Russia) Mikhail Aleshin (Italy) Davide Rigon	Ferrari 488 GT3	294	+69 Lap
NC	Am	27	(Italy) Daiko Lazarus Racing	(United Kingdom) Graham Davidson (France) Sylvain Debs (Spain) Fernando Navarrete (United Kingdom) Immanuel Vinke	Lamborghini Huracán GT3 (2019)	252	
NC	PA	14	(Czech Republic) Scuderia Praha	(Czech Republic) Josef Král (Italy) Gabriele Lancieri (Italy) Matteo Malucelli (Czech Republic) Jiří Písařík	Ferrari 488 GT3	240	
NC	P	42	(Germany) BMW Team Schnitzer	(Brazil) Augusto Farfus (United States) John Edwards (Germany) Martin Tomczyk	BMW M6 GT3	237	
NC	S	5	(Germany) Phoenix Racing	(United Kingdom) Finlay Hutchison (Spain) Iván Pareras (Germany) Kim-Luis Schramm	Audi R8 LMS	229	
NC	S	555	(China) Orange 1 FFF Racing Team	(Italy) Michele Beretta (Mexico) Diego Menchaca (United States) Taylor Proto (Italy) Giacomo Altoè	Lamborghini Huracán GT3 (2019)	224	
NC	P	00	(Japan) Good Smile Racing & Type-Moon Racing	(Japan) Nobuteru Taniguchi (Japan) Tatsuya Kataoka (United Kingdom) Adam Christodoulou	Mercedes-AMG GT3	217	
NC	P	51	(Italy) AF Corse	(United Kingdom) Sam Bird (United Kingdom) James Calado (Italy) Alessandro Pier Guidi	Ferrari 488 GT3	199	
NC	PA	52	(Italy) AF Corse	(Italy) Andrea Bertolini (Netherlands) Niek Hommerson (Belgium) Louis Machiels (Finland) Toni Vilander	Ferrari 488 GT3	186	
NC	PA	91	(Germany) Herberth Motorsport	(Switzerland) Daniel Allemann (Germany) Ralf Bohn (Germany) Alfred Renauer (Germany) Robert Renauer	Porsche 911 GT3 R	179	
NC	S	333	(Germany) Rinaldi Racing	(Russia) Denis Bulatov (South Africa) David Perel (Russia) Rinat Salikhov (Netherlands) Indy Dontje	Ferrari 488 GT3	168	
NC	S	55	(Germany) Attempto Racing	(Italy) Mattia Drudi (Netherlands) Pieter Schothorst (Netherlands) Steijn Schothorst	Audi R8 LMS	147	
NC	P	108	(United Kingdom) Bentley Team M-Sport	(Belgium) Maxime Soulet (United Kingdom) Alex Buncombe (Finland) Markus Palttala	Bentley Continental GT3	118	
NC	INV	50	(Belgium) 1969 Tribute	(Belgium) Loïc Deman (Belgium) Angélique Detavernier (Belgium) Marc Duez (Belgium) Stéphane Lémeret	Porsche 911 GT3 Cup MR	94	
NC	P	62	(Switzerland) R-Motorsport	(Belgium) Maxime Martin (United Kingdom) Matt Parry (France) Matthieu Vaxivière	Aston Martin Vantage AMR GT3	84	
NC	PA	31	(United Kingdom) Team Parker Racing	(United Kingdom) Derek Pierce (United Kingdom) Glynn Geddie (United Kingdom) Andy Meyrick (United Kingdom) Ryan Ratcliffe	Bentley Continental GT3	51	
NC	Am	37	(France) 3Y Technology	(France) Philippe Bourgeois (France) Jean-Paul Buffin (France) Philippe Haezebrouck (France) Gilles Vannelet	BMW M6 GT3	33	
NC	S	762	(Switzerland) R-Motorsport	(United Kingdom) Ricky Collard (Austria) Ferdinand Habsburg (Switzerland) Hugo de Sadeleer (Finland) Aaro Vainio	Aston Martin Vantage AMR GT3	30	
NC	P	227	(Chinese Taipei) HubAuto Corsa	(New Zealand) Nick Cassidy (Australia) Nick Foster (Brazil) Daniel Serra	Ferrari 488 GT3	25	
NC	Am	36	(Germany) Walkenhorst Motorsport	(Norway) Anders Buchardt (United Kingdom) David Pittard (Germany) Henry Walkenhorst (United States) Don Yount	BMW M6 GT3	21	
NC	P	59	(United Kingdom) Garage 59	(United Kingdom) Jonathan Adam (France) Côme Ledogar (United Kingdom) Andrew Watson	Aston Martin Vantage AMR GT3	10	
NC	P	109	(United Kingdom) M-Sport Team Bentley	(Brazil) Rodrigo Baptista (United Kingdom) Callum MacLeod (United Kingdom) Seb Morris	Bentley Continental GT3	6	

Intercontinental GT Challenge
Previous race: California 8 Hours	2019 season	Next race: Suzuka 10 Hours
