= South African Touring Cars =

South African motorsport championship

- Category: Touring Cars
- Country: South Africa
- Inaugural season: 2016
- Constructors: Audi; Ford; Toyota; Volkswagen
- Tyre suppliers: Dunlop
- Drivers' champion: GTC: (South Africa) Robert Wolk; Supacup: (South Africa) Leyton Fourie
- Constructors' champion: GTC: Toyota; Supacup: Volkswagen
- Official website: satc.co.za

South African Touring Cars (formerly the Global Touring Car Championship) is a South African touring car series co-founded by Gary Formato and Vic Maharaj in 2016 and sanctioned by Motorsport South Africa. The series, which was renamed in 2024, has dubbed itself South Africa's "premier motorsport championship". Sasol has been the series' title sponsor and sole fuel supplier since its inaugural season.

The series is divided into two classes, namely GTC (which runs silhouette racing cars) and GTC Supacup.

== History ==
Following the folding of the National Production Car Championship in late 2015, South Africa lacked a premier touring car racing series. The Sasol GTC Championship (which had been in development for nearly four years), spearheaded by Vic Maharaj and Gary Formato, was given the green light by Motorsport South Africa in March 2015.

The new series was set to be attractive due to its lower costs (reportedly ZAR200,000 less for a season than the NPCC). All the cars would run identical six-speed Albins sequential gearboxes (identical to those used in the Supercars Championship), shock absorbers, suspension and brakes in order to aid cost-saving. The car regulations would be frozen for the series's first five seasons, and car development was banned. Originally slated to consist of four manufacturers (Audi, Ford, Nissan and Jaguar) fielding 12 cars between them, there were only 10 cars fielded in the inaugural race at Zwartkops Raceway. With Nissan and Jaguar completely pulling out before the championship even began, the series attracted Volkswagen and BMW to also enter two and four cars respectively.

The inaugural season calendar consisted of seven rounds with two races each, except for the rounds at Killarney Race Track and Aldo Scribante Circuit, of which each had three races. It kicked off at Zwartkops Raceway on the 9th of August, seeing South African racing veteran Michael Stephen take the series' first ever victory. The season finale was staged at Prince George Circuit in East London, with Stephen being crowned the first Sasol GTC champion. Gennaro Bonafede finished as championship runner-up with five victories to his name.

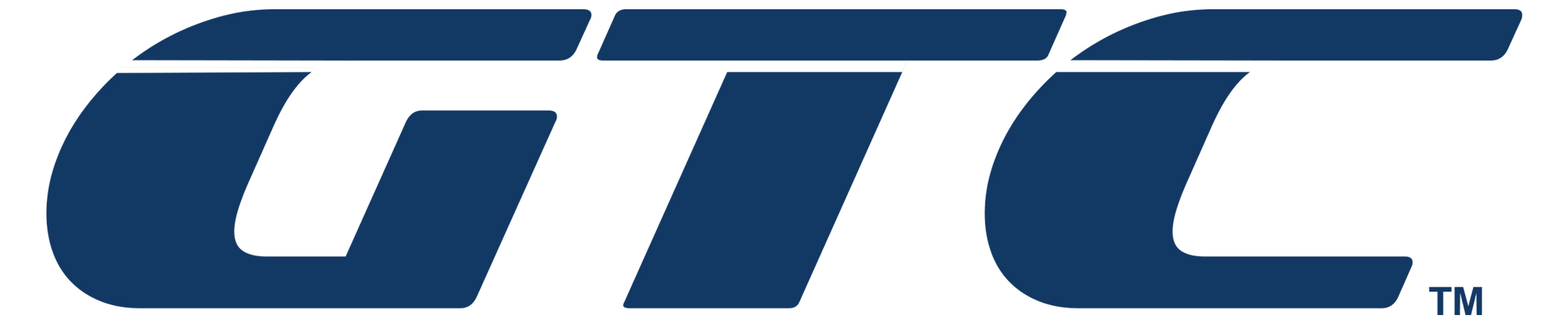
The former logo of the GTC Championship, 2016-2023

== Cars ==
=== GTC ===
The cars consist of a single-specification tubular chassis with metal bodywork, supplied by the manufacturer. Each manufacturer also provides a turbocharged 2-litre petrol engine which produces a maximum of 436 bhp and 600 nm of torque. All cars are rear-wheel drive. The gearboxes are standardised Albins six-speed sequential gearboxes, the same gearboxes used in the Australian Supercars Championship. Suspension parts, dampers and brakes are also standard across all cars, and all cars run slick tyres provided by Dunlop. Traction control and Anti-lock braking systems are banned. Sasol provides fuel to all cars. The cars were anticipated to reach up to 280 km/h prior to the first season.

Following a series of engine issues during the first round of the 2017 season, changes had to be introduced to lessen stress on the engines. This included setting an RPM-limit of 7200, as well as decreasing the absolute boost pressure of the turbochargers to 2100 millibar.

=== GTC2/GTC Supacup ===
The GTC2 class allows for production racing cars only, also with 2-litre turbocharged petrol engines, but instead capped to 281 bhp. The cars have to be front-wheel drive and must keep their factory engines, gearboxes and dashboards. Limited-slip differentials are permitted in order to aid traction. They use steel tube roll cages built by South African ex-racing driver Etienne van der Linde. Unlike in the GTC Class, aftermarket shock absorbers are permitted, but are cost-capped at R50 000 per set. Each car is given one set of Dunlop slick tyres at the beginning of a season, and then two fresh tyres at each race.

== Champions ==
=== Drivers ===
Year	GTC	GTC2
2016	(South Africa) Michael Stephen	(South Africa) Daniel Rowe
2017	(South Africa) Michael Stephen	(South Africa) Keagan Masters
2018	(South Africa) Michael Stephen	(South Africa) Keagan Masters
2019	(South Africa) Keagan Masters	(South Africa) Brad Liebenberg
Year	GTC	GTC Supacup
2020	(South Africa) Daniel Rowe	(South Africa) Brad Liebenberg
2021	(South Africa) Robert Wolk	(South Africa) Brad Liebenberg
2022	(South Africa) Robert Wolk	(South Africa) Leyton Fourie
2023	(South Africa) Robert Wolk	(South Africa) Brad Liebenberg
Year	SATC	SATC Supacup
2024	(South Africa) Robert Wolk	(South Africa) Keegan Campos
2025	(South Africa) Michael van Rooyen	(South Africa) Tate Bishop
2026	(South Africa) Julian van der Watt	(South Africa) Jason Loosemore

=== Manufacturers ===
Season	GTC	GTC2
2016	BMW	spec class
2017	Audi	spec class
2018	Audi	spec class
2019	Volkswagen	spec class
Year	GTC	GTC Supacup
2020	Volkswagen	spec class
2021	Toyota	spec class
2022	Toyota	spec class
2023	Toyota	spec class
Year	SATC	SATC Supacup
2024	Toyota	spec class
2025	Toyota	spec class
2026	Volkswagen	spec class
