= Hype Energy Drinks =

Energy drinks range

- Type: Energy drink
- Manufacturer: Hype Energy Drinks Company
- Introduced: 1994; 31 years ago
- Ingredients: Caffeine, Taurine, B vitamins, Carbonated Water, Sucrose
- Website: www.hype.com

Hype Energy Drinks is a range of energy drinks sold in Europe, the Middle East, Africa, and Latin America. First launched in 1994 by Hard Rock Cafe founders, the company has been headed since May 2000 by former Formula One racing driver, Bertrand Gachot; Hype Energy Drinks was an official sponsor of Formula One racing team Force India between 2015 and 2018.

In 2016, Hype Energy Drinks started their involvement within the video game industry by sponsoring European leading eSports organisation, Epsilon eSports. Now, in 2018, following the rise of Formula One eSports Series Hype Energy Drinks became the official title sponsor of Sahara Force India's F1 eSports Organisation, Hype Energy eForce India.

== History ==
Hype Energy was first developed in 1993 by Ashley Roy, Nigel Spiro, and Andrew Barshall and backed by Hard Rock Cafe founder, Barry Cox. Under Spiro and Managing Director David Harris, Hype Energy became heavily involved in motorsport by first sponsoring the Arrows Formula One team and subsequently Benetton, Williams, a NASCAR and several motorbike teams.

In 1997, former racing driver Bertrand Gachot signed a distribution agreement with Hype Energy in order to introduce the product to France. Gachot was one of a handful of distributors who remained committed to the brand in 1998, he approached the Swiss licensor to buy the company holding the Hype Energy trademarks. After two years of negotiation, May 2000, Gachot came to an agreement and restructured the company. The improved Hype Energy product gave the company a substantial boost. It was first launched in France and the Persian Gulf, then the US and Canada, and by 2001, it had achieved significant global growth. The brand is now present in more than 40 countries across the globe from the US, Canada, Honduras and Panama to Africa and the Middle East. Hype Energy is manufactured in the US, Canada and the Netherlands.

== Ingredients ==
Hype Energy MFP contains ingredients including taurine, carbonated water, sugar, caffeine and five B vitamins: Vit B2, Vit B3 (niacin), Vit B5, Vit B6 and Vit B12. Hype Energy MFP is free from artificial colours and preservatives. Other variations contain a mixture of vitamins and natural flavorings.

== Partnerships ==
Hype Energy have historically been involved in Formula One sponsorship, owing to Gachot's former career as a Formula One driver from 1989 to 1995. Hype Energy initially sponsored Larrousse—for whom Gachot was driving—in 1992. They were also an official partner of Force India from 2015 until 2018, having previously sponsored Arrows (1995), Benetton (1996) and Williams (1997).
