= Formula Volkswagen South Africa Championship =

- Category: Single seaters
- Country: South Africa
- Inaugural season: 2008
- Folded: 2013
- Last Drivers' champion: (South Africa) Robert Wolk
- Last Teams' champion: (South Africa) Racing Factors

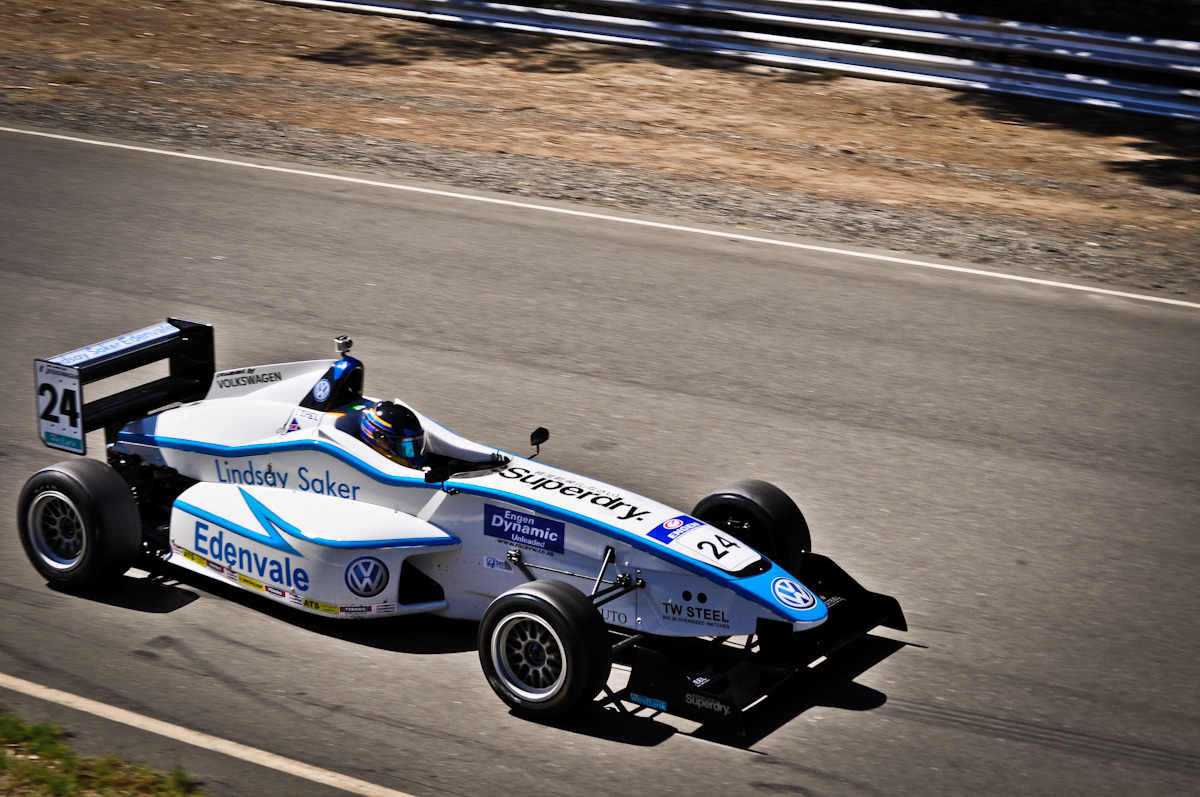
Formula Volkswagen car driven by David Perel

The Formula Volkswagen South Africa Championship was an open wheel racing series run by Volkswagen and based in South Africa. The cars are the fastest race series in the country. The inaugural season was in 2008. The most famous drivers to have competed in this series include Gavin Cronje, Maxime Soulet, Wesleigh Orr, Cristiano Morgado and Simon Moss. Tasmin Pepper, a leading South African female driver has been a regular competitor in 2009 and 2010.

In 2010, the series has suffered from reduced numbers of competitors, with grids often totaling less than 15 drivers. New 6 speed gearboxes are anticipated for the 2011 season.

== Champions ==
Season	Champion	Team Champion
2008	(South Africa) Gavin Cronje	(South Africa) Morgado Racing
2009	(South Africa) Jayde Kruger	(South Africa) Racing Factors
2010	(South Africa) Simon Moss	(South Africa) Bravo Racing
2011	(South Africa) Jayde Kruger	(South Africa) Racing Factors
2012	(South Africa) Jayde Kruger	
2013	(South Africa) Robert Wolk	

== See also ==
- Formula Vee
