= Zwartkops Raceway =

Racing venue in Centurion, South Africa

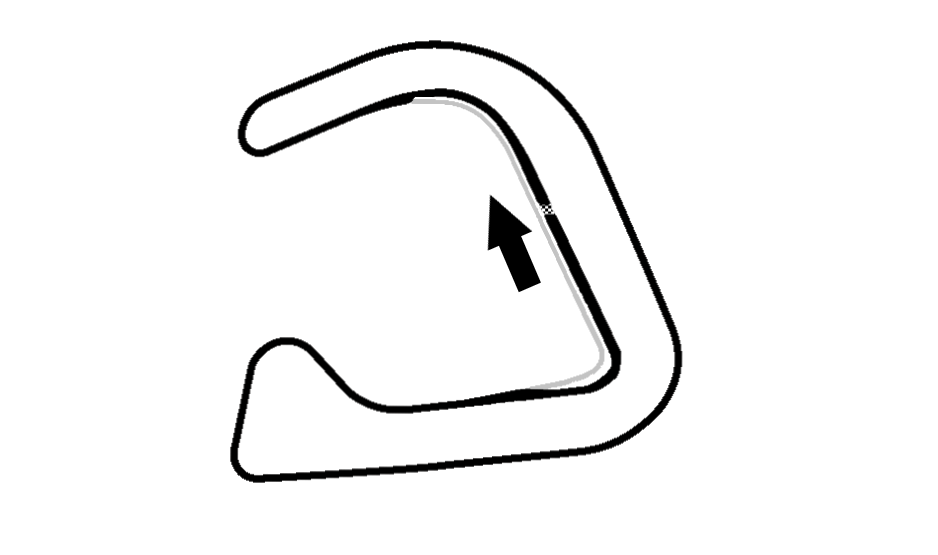
- Full Circuit (2001–present)
- Location: Centurion, Gauteng, South Africa
- Coordinates: 25°48′36.4″S 28°06′34.9″E
- Owner: Peter du Toit
- Operator: Zwartkops Owners Club
- Opened: 18 November 1961; 64 years ago Re-opened: 24 March 2001; 25 years ago
- Closed: 1998
- Major events: Current: Global Touring Car Championship (2016–present); Former: Formula Volkswagen South Africa Championship

Full Circuit (2001–present)
- Length: 2.400 km (1.491 mi)
- Turns: 8
- Race lap record: 0:58.839 ( (South Africa) André Bezuidenhout, Dallara F189, 2008, F1)

Full Circuit (1986–1998)
- Length: 2.000 km (1.243 mi)
- Turns: 6

Original Circuit (1961–1985)
- Length: 3.228 km (2.006 mi)
- Turns: 8

Zwartkops Raceway is a 2.400 km (1.491 mi) circuit located in Centurion, South Africa. The circuit was inaugurally opened in November 1961, was closed in 1998, but re-opened in March 2001.

== Lap records ==
As of May 2023, the fastest official race lap records at the Zwartkops Raceway are listed as:

Category	Time	Driver	Vehicle	Event
Full Circuit (2001–present): 2.400 km (1.491 mi)
Formula One	0:58.839	André Bezuidenhout	Dallara F189	2008 Zwartkops South African Monoposto round
Formula Volkswagen	0:59.278	Robert Wolk	Reynard Formula Volkswagen	2012 Zwartkops Formula Volkswagen South Africa Championship round
GT3	0:59.625	Michael Stephen	Audi R8 LMS GT3	2023 Zwartkops South Africa GT round
GTC	1:03.120	Saood Variawa	Toyota Corolla (E210)	2023 1st Zwartkops Global Touring Car Championship round
SupaCup	1:05.466	Bradley Liebenberg	Volkswagen Polo VI	2023 1st Zwartkops Global Touring Car Championship round
