= Gennaro Bonafede =

South African racing driver

- Nationality: South African
- Born: 18 September 1990 (age 36) Johannesburg, South Africa

Intercontinental GT Challenge career
- Debut season: 2019
- Current team: Walkenhorst Motorsport
- Categorisation: FIA Silver
- Car number: 36
- Starts: 2
- Wins: 0
- Poles: 0
- Fastest laps: 0

Previous series
- 2016–2018 2010–2015 2007–2009: Sasol GTC Championship; Bridgestone Production Car Championship; Volkswagen Polo Cup South Africa

Gennaro Bonafede (born 18 September 1990) is a South African racing driver who competed in the Intercontinental GT Challenge.

== Racing career ==
=== 1995-2015: Early years and local success ===
Bonafede began racing karts aged 5. He achieved early success, winning the 1997 Cadet Class Championship at only 7 years old. He took a one-year hiatus from racing in 1998, but returned in 1999 to achieve a 4th-place finish in the WTP South African Championship. He moved to the United Kingdom after this, competing in British karting events for the following two years. During the 2006 ROK World Karting Championships, Bonafede was the youngest competitor to take part. He was set to win the 2007 SA Karting Championship, but suffered a broken chain during the final round of the season.

2007 saw Bonafede move to saloon racing, joining the South African Volkswagen Polo Cup, achieving mild success with a podium finish and a pole position in his first season. He was also invited to partake in a round of the European Polo Cup and achieved a 9th-place finish. Focusing on his matric examinations in 2008, he had to settle for a second-place finish in the Polo Cup season that year, with 4 wins and 2 pole positions. He achieved another second-place finish in the 2009 championship, with 3 wins and 4 pole positions.

Bonafede joined the Bridgestone Production Car Championship in 2010, and raced in the series until it folded in 2015. He achieved relative success, with a third-place finish in the 2012 and 2014 championships being the highlights of his stay.

=== 2016-present: Sasol GTC and European debut ===
After the Production Car Championship folded in 2015, Bonafede joined BMW for the inaugural season of the Sasol GTC Championship in 2016. He ended the season second in the championship, 111 points behind champion Michael Stephen. The 2017 season saw Bonafede start off strongly, leading the championship for over half the season, before falling short at the final round at Zwartkops Raceway, once again to Stephen. He ended the 2018 championship in third place, crashing out in the season finale and losing second in the standings to Simon Moss.

2019 would see Bonafede move on from Sasol GTC, finally pursuing a European career. He joined Boutsen Ginion Racing for two rounds of the 2019 Blancpain GT Series Endurance Cup, finishing 46th overall and 8th in the Am-class at the 24 Hours of Spa. He finished 5th in the Pro Am-class (32nd overall) at the 3 Hours of Barcelona, ending the season 21st in the Pro Am-standings and 28th in the Am-standings. He also took part in two rounds of the 2019 Intercontinental GT Challenge, with the 24 Hours of Spa overlapping between the two championships. He secured a win in the Am-class at his home race at the 2019 Kyalami 9 Hours.
