= Gavin Cronje =

South African racing driver

- Nationality: (South Africa) South African
- Born: 21 August 1979 (age 47) Johannesburg (South Africa)

Formula Le Mans Cup career
- Current team: DAMS

Championship titles
- 2008: Formula Volkswagen South Africa Championship

Gavin Cronje (born 21 April 1979 in Johannesburg) is a South African former racing driver. He has competed in such series as Euroseries 3000 and the Formula Renault 3.5 Series. He won the inaugural Formula Volkswagen South Africa Championship in 2008 with Morgado Racing. He was runner-up in the 2009 Formula Le Mans Cup season to DAMS teammate Nico Verdonck.
