= Johan Fourie =

South African middle-distance runner

Personal information
- Nationality: South African
- Born: December 2, 1959 (age 66) Springs, Gauteng, South Africa

Sport
- Sport: Athletics
- Event: Middle-distance running
- Coached by: Pierre Délèze

Achievements and titles
- Personal best: 1500m: 3:33.87 (1987)
Medal record
Men's athletics
Representing South Africa
African Championships
Bronze medal – third place	1993 Durban	1500 m

Johan Fourie (born December 2, 1959) is a South African middle-distance athlete who was one of the world's leading 1500m/mile exponents in the 1980s but was prevented from competing internationally in his prime due to the sporting sanctions imposed on South Africa in condemnation of the policy of apartheid.

Fourie's best 1500m performance was 3:33.87, a time recorded at the SA Championships in Stellenbosch in 1987 without significant opposition or pacemakers and his best mile time was 3:50.82 also recorded in 1987. During the mid-1980s he trained with Swiss Pierre Délèze in Europe. Délèze, who defeated Sebastian Coe over 1500m in Zurich in 1985, believed that Fourie was capable of running a sub 3:30 1500m, given the appropriate race conditions

He was born in Springs and raised in Vereeniging in Gauteng Province, where he attended school and won his first national 1500m in 1977 while still a junior.

Prevented from competing on international stage, he nevertheless managed to entertain athletics followers in the 1980s which has been characterised as a golden age of South African middle and long distance running. Apart from running more than 50 sub-four miles, he also ran two sub-four miles in one hour and in 1984 was awarded the Beinart award by the South African Athletics Statisticians for being the top ranked South African athlete in the world in 1983.

== Personal life ==
Johan married 400m distance Springbok athlete Marinda Fourie in 1989. They have two children, Rico Fourie and Shan Fourie. Johan and his family currently live in Stellenbosch, South Africa. He and his wife coach "The Dogsquad" athletics group.
