= Malte Ebdrup =

Danish racing driver (born 2006)

- Nationality: (Denmark) Danish
- Born: 24 August 2006 (age 20) Farsø, Denmark
- Categorisation: FIA Silver

Championship titles
- 2025: TCR Denmark Touring Car Series

Malte Ebdrup (born 24 August 2006) is a Danish racing driver who last competed in the GT World Challenge Europe Endurance Cup for Selected Car Racing.

== Career ==
Ebdrup began karting in 2018, competing until 2022. During his career, Ebdrup most notably won the 2021 RMC Denmark E20 Senior title, which earned him an invite to the end-of-year RMC Grand Finals, in which he finished fifth. During 2021, Ebdrup also made his car racing debut, competing in select rounds of the Yokohama 1600 Challenge Denmark.

The following year, Ebdrup joined GMB Motorsport for his first full year in car racing, as he continued in the Yokohama 1600 Challenge Denmark. In the six-round season, Ebdrup took wins at Ring Djursland, Jyllands-Ringen and Padborg Park en route to a fifth-place points finish. In 2023, Ebdrup continued with GMB as he switched to the Danish Super 2L Championship, a season in which he took five wins and six other podiums, missing out on the title by one point to Jakob Steffensen.

Remaining in Denmark for 2024, Ebdrup stayed with GMB to step up to Super GT Danmark, but those plans fell through when the team folded in February. Following that, Ebdrup joined RaceGroup, which acquired GMB's TCR assets, as part of their expanded three-car programme in TCR Denmark under the Mascot Motorsport banner. In his rookie season in the series, Ebdrup won twice across the first two Jyllands-Ringen rounds, but his season was cut short with three rounds to go after a warm-up crash at Ring Djursland. Continuing with Mascot for 2025, Ebdrup began the season with a lone win at Jyllands-Ringen, before taking four wins between the Copenhagen and the Padborg Park finale, as well as missing the podium only once, to secure the overall and U25 titles.

In 2026, Ebdrup switched to GT3 racing, joining AF Corse–run Selected Car Racing to compete in the Gold Cup class of the GT World Challenge Europe Endurance Cup, sharing the No. 71 Ferrari 296 GT3 Evo with Simon Birch and Frederik Schandorff. In his rookie season in the series, Ebdrup scored Gold Cup wins at Monza and Algarve to secure runner-up honours in class.

== Karting record ==
=== Karting career summary ===
Season	Series	Team	Position
2021	RMC Grand Finals – E20 Senior	Mads Rathcke Thomsen	5th
2022	Rotax Max Challenge Denmark – Senior		26th

== Racing record ==
=== Racing career summary ===
Season	Series	Team	Races	Wins	Poles	F/Laps	Podiums	Points	Position
2021	Yokohama 1600 Challenge Denmark		4	0	0	0	0		18th
2022	Yokohama 1600 Challenge Denmark	GMB Motorsport	12	3	1	1	5	230	5th
2023	Danish Super 2L Championship	GMB Motorsport	15	5	0	4	11		**2nd**
2024	TCR Denmark Touring Car Series	Mascot Motorsport	12	2	0	0	5	230	8th
2025	TCR Denmark Touring Car Series	Mascot Motorsport	18	5	4	6	17	499	**1st**
2026	GT World Challenge Europe Endurance Cup	Selected Car Racing	5	0	0	0	0	12	21st
2026	GT World Challenge Europe Endurance Cup – Gold	Selected Car Racing	5	2	1	0	3	104	**2nd**
2026	Intercontinental GT Challenge	Selected Car Racing	1	0	0	0	0	0	NC

* Season still in progress.

=== Complete GT World Challenge Europe results ===
==== GT World Challenge Europe Endurance Cup ====
(key) (Races in bold indicate pole position) (Races in italics indicate fastest lap)

Year	Team	Car	Class	1	2	3	4	5	6	7	Pos.	Points
2026	Selected Car Racing	Ferrari 296 GT3 Evo	Gold	LEC; 16	MNZ; 14	SPA; 6H; 16	SPA; 12H; 42	SPA; 24H; 26	NÜR; 11	**ALG**; 4	2nd	104
