= 2024 TCR Denmark Touring Car Series =

Car racing competition

The 2024 TCR Denmark Touring Car Series was the fifth season of the TCR Denmark Touring Car Series. The season began at Padborg Park on 27 April and ended at Jyllandsringen on 28 September.

Kasper Jensen won the Drivers' Championship at the penultimate race, while the Teams' Championship was won by Mascot Motorsport.

== Teams and drivers ==
Team	Car	No.	Drivers	Class	Rounds
(Denmark) Mascot Motorsport	Honda Civic Type R TCR (FL5)	6	(Denmark) Kasper Jensen		All
(Denmark) Mascot Motorsport	Honda Civic Type R TCR (FK7)	24	(Denmark) Malte Ebdrup	U	1–5
(Denmark) Mascot Motorsport	Honda Civic Type R TCR (FL5)	44	(Denmark) Gustav Birch	U	All
(Denmark) Insight Racing DK	Hyundai i30 N TCR	9	(Denmark) Jacob Mathiassen		1–2
(Denmark) Insight Racing DK	Hyundai i30 N TCR	11	(Denmark) Martin Andersen		4
(Denmark) Insight Racing DK	Hyundai i30 N TCR	21	(Sweden) Anton Bergström	U	6–7
(Denmark) Insight Racing DK	Hyundai i30 N TCR	33	(Denmark) Lars Højris Nielsen	T	4, 7
(Denmark) Insight Racing DK	Hyundai i30 N TCR	444	(Denmark) Silas Rytter	U	1–3
(Sweden) TPR Motorsport	Honda Civic Type R TCR (FK7)	17	(Sweden) Jonathan Engstrom	U	6–7
(Sweden) TPR Motorsport	Honda Civic Type R TCR (FL5)	41	(Denmark) René Junker Povlsen	T	All
(Sweden) TPR Motorsport	Honda Civic Type R TCR (FK7)	60	(Denmark) Dennis Lind		4
(Sweden) TPR Motorsport	Honda Civic Type R TCR (FL5)	77	(Germany) Mike Halder		All
(Denmark) Markussen Racing	Cupra León VZ TCR	18	(Denmark) Michael Markussen		All
(Denmark) PL Racing	Honda Civic Type R TCR (FL5)	22	(Denmark) Philip Lindberg		All
(Norway) Esbjug Motorsport	Honda Civic Type R TCR (FK7)	23	(Norway) Didrik Esbjug	U	3
(Denmark) Wunderov Motortsport	Honda Civic Type R TCR (FK7)	50	(Denmark) Jacob Wunderov		All
(Denmark) Team Bundgas	Honda Civic Type R TCR (FK7)	169	(Denmark) Kim König	T	1–2, 4, 6–7
(Denmark) Dan Agro Racing	Peugeot 308 TCR	312	(Denmark) Marco Dahl	U	1, 7

Icon	Class
U	U25/Drivers below 25
T	Trophy

== Calendar and results ==
Rnd.		Circuit	Date	Pole position	Fastest lap	Winning driver	Winning team	U25 winner	Trophy winner
1	R1	(Denmark) Padborg Park	27–28 April	(Denmark) Kasper Jensen	(Denmark) Kasper Jensen	(Germany) Mike Halder	(Sweden) TPR Motorsport	(Denmark) Silas Rytter	(Denmark) Kim König
1	R2	(Denmark) Padborg Park	27–28 April		(Denmark) Kasper Jensen	(Denmark) Kasper Jensen	(Denmark) Mascot Motorsport	(Denmark) Gustav Birch	(Denmark) René Junker Povlsen
1	R3	(Denmark) Padborg Park	27–28 April		(Denmark) Kasper Jensen	(Germany) Mike Halder	(Sweden) TPR Motorsport	(Denmark) Malte Ebdrup	(Denmark) René Junker Povlsen
2	R4	(Denmark) Jyllandsringen	11–12 May	(Denmark) Kasper Jensen	(Germany) Mike Halder	(Denmark) Kasper Jensen	(Denmark) Mascot Motorsport	(Denmark) Malte Ebdrup	(Denmark) René Junker Povlsen
2	R5	(Denmark) Jyllandsringen	11–12 May		(Germany) Mike Halder	(Germany) Mike Halder	(Sweden) TPR Motorsport	(Denmark) Silas Rytter	(Denmark) René Junker Povlsen
2	R6	(Denmark) Jyllandsringen	11–12 May		(Germany) Mike Halder	(Denmark) Malte Ebdrup	(Denmark) Mascot Motorsport	(Denmark) Malte Ebdrup	(Denmark) René Junker Povlsen
3	R7	(Norway) Rudskogen	8–9 June	(Denmark) Kasper Jensen	(Denmark) Kasper Jensen	(Denmark) Kasper Jensen	(Denmark) Mascot Motorsport	(Denmark) Malte Ebdrup	(Denmark) René Junker Povlsen
3	R8	(Norway) Rudskogen	8–9 June		(Germany) Mike Halder	(Denmark) Kasper Jensen	(Denmark) Mascot Motorsport	(Denmark) Malte Ebdrup	(Denmark) René Junker Povlsen
3	R9	(Norway) Rudskogen	8–9 June		(Germany) Mike Halder	(Denmark) Kasper Jensen	(Denmark) Mascot Motorsport	(Denmark) Gustav Birch	(Denmark) René Junker Povlsen
4	R10	(Denmark) Jyllandsringen	17–18 August	(Denmark) Dennis Lind	(Germany) Mike Halder	(Germany) Mike Halder	(Sweden) TPR Motorsport	(Denmark) Malte Ebdrup	(Denmark) René Junker Povlsen
4	R11	(Denmark) Jyllandsringen	17–18 August		(Germany) Mike Halder	(Denmark) Malte Ebdrup	(Denmark) Mascot Motorsport	(Denmark) Malte Ebdrup	(Denmark) René Junker Povlsen
4	R12	(Denmark) Jyllandsringen	17–18 August		(Germany) Mike Halder	(Germany) Mike Halder	(Sweden) TPR Motorsport	(Denmark) Malte Ebdrup	(Denmark) René Junker Povlsen
5	R13	(Denmark) Ring Djursland	31 August – 1 September	(Germany) Mike Halder	Cancelled due to extensive barrier damage after warm up session crash.				
5	R14	(Denmark) Ring Djursland	31 August – 1 September		Cancelled due to extensive barrier damage after warm up session crash.				
5	R15	(Denmark) Ring Djursland	31 August – 1 September		Cancelled due to extensive barrier damage after warm up session crash.				
6	R16	(Denmark) Padborg Park	13–14 September	(Germany) Mike Halder	(Denmark) Kasper Jensen	(Denmark) Kasper Jensen	(Denmark) Mascot Motorsport	(Denmark) Gustav Birch	(Denmark) René Junker Povlsen
6	R17	(Denmark) Padborg Park	13–14 September		(Denmark) Kasper Jensen	(Denmark) Kasper Jensen	(Denmark) Mascot Motorsport	(Denmark) Gustav Birch	(Denmark) René Junker Povlsen
6	R18	(Denmark) Padborg Park	13–14 September		(Germany) Mike Halder	(Denmark) Michael Markussen	(Denmark) Markussen Racing	(Denmark) Gustav Birch	(Denmark) René Junker Povlsen
7	R19	(Denmark) Jyllandsringen	28–29 September	(Denmark) Kasper Jensen	(Denmark) Kasper Jensen	(Denmark) Kasper Jensen	(Denmark) Mascot Motorsport	(Denmark) Gustav Birch	(Denmark) René Junker Povlsen
7	R20	(Denmark) Jyllandsringen	28–29 September		(Denmark) Kasper Jensen	(Denmark) René Junker Povlsen	(Sweden) TPR Motorsport	(Denmark) Gustav Birch	(Denmark) René Junker Povlsen
7	R21	(Denmark) Jyllandsringen	28–29 September		(Germany) Mike Halder	(Denmark) Kasper Jensen	(Denmark) Mascot Motorsport	(Denmark) Gustav Birch	(Denmark) René Junker Povlsen

== Championship Standings ==
Scoring system

Points are awarded to the top 16 finishers or those who complete more than 75% of the race will earn points. Points are also awarded based on qualifying position in this order; 6-5-4-3-2-1.

Overall

Position	1st	2nd	3rd	4th	5th	6th	7th	8th	9th	10th	11th	12th	13th	14th	15th	Fastest lap
Race	30	26	23	21	19	17	15	13	11	9	7	5	3	2	1	2

=== Drivers' Championship ===
==== Overall ====
Pos.	Driver	PDB1			JYL1			RUD			JYL2			DJU			PDB2			JYL3			Pts.
Pos.	Driver	RD1	RD2	RD3	RD1	RD2	RD3	RD1	RD2	RD3	RD1	RD2	RD3	RD1	RD2	RD3	RD1	RD2	RD3	RD1	RD2	RD3	Pts.
1	(Denmark) Kasper Jensen	2	1	2	1	2	3	1	1	1	2	4	3	C	C	C	1	1	10	1	2	1	492
2	(Germany) Mike Halder	1	2	1	2	1	2	2	3	2	1	2	1	C	C	C	DSQ	2	4	2	11	2	455
3	(Denmark) Gustav Birch	8	4	7	6	5	6	9	5	4	5	5	4	C	C	C	3	6	5	4	3	3	338
4	(Denmark) Michael Markussen	3	6	4	DSQ	7	7	4	2	3	7	6	Ret	C	C	C	2	3	1	3	4	4	337
5	(Denmark) Jacob Wunderov	5	5	10	8	10	10	6	6	9	8	3	10	C	C	C	4	4	2	7	5	6	287
6	(Denmark) René Junker Povlsen	Ret	9	8	5	8	5	5	7	10	6	9	7	C	C	C	5	5	3	8	1	5	284
7	(Denmark) Philip Lindberg	7	3	3	7	6	9	8	10	6	9	DSQ	DNS	C	C	C	6	9	8	5	9	9	236
8	(Denmark) Malte Ebdrup	DSQ	10	9	3	4	1	3	4	7	4	1	2	C	C	C							230
9	(Denmark) Silas Rytter	4	7	5	4	3	4	7	8	5													167
10	(Denmark) Kim König	9	12	12	DSQ	Ret	DNS				11	11	9				8	8	9	10	6	8	122
11	(Denmark) Jacob Mathiassen	6	8	6	9	9	8																82
12	(Sweden) Anton Bergström																7	7	7	6	7	Ret	77
13	(Denmark) Lars Højris Nielsen										10	10	8							12	10	7	60
14	(Denmark) Dennis Lind										3	8	5										55
15	(Denmark) Marco Dahl	10	11	11																11	8	10	52
16	(Sweden) Jonathan Engstrom																DNS	10	6	9	Ret	DNS	37
17	(Norway) Didrik Esbjug							10	9	8													33
18	(Denmark) Martin Andersen										DSQ	7	6										32
Pos.	Driver	PDB1			JYL1			RUD			JYL2			DJU			PDB2			JYL3			Pts.

Colour	Result
Gold	Winner
Silver	Second place
Bronze	Third place
Green	Points classification
Blue	Non-points classification
Blue	Non-classified finish (NC)
Purple	Retired, not classified (Ret)
Red	Did not qualify (DNQ)
Red	Did not pre-qualify (DNPQ)
Black	Disqualified (DSQ)
White	Did not start (DNS)
White	Withdrew (WD)
White	Race cancelled (C)
Blank	Did not practice (DNP)
Blank	Did not arrive (DNA)
Blank	Excluded (EX)

==== U25 ====
Pos.	Driver	Pts.
1	(Denmark) Gustav Birch	196
2	(Denmark) Malte Ebdrup	125
3	(Denmark) Silas Rytter	97
4	(Sweden) Anton Bergström	48
5	(Denmark) Marco Dahl	44
6	(Sweden) Jonathan Engstrom	26
7	(Norway) Didrik Esbjug	18

==== Trophy ====
Pos.	Driver	Pts.
1	(Denmark) René Junker Povlsen	221
2	(Denmark) Kim König	115
3	(Denmark) Lars Højris Nielsen	56
