= 2025 TCR Denmark Touring Car Series =

Car racing competition

The 2025 TCR Denmark Touring Car Series was the sixth and final season of the TCR Denmark Touring Car Series. The season began at Padborg Park on 27 April and ended at the same track on 13 September.

Malte Ebdrup won the Drivers' Championship at the final race, ahead of Kasper Jensen and Mike Halder, while the Teams' Championship was won by Mascot Motorsport.

== Teams and drivers ==
Team	Car	No.	Drivers	Class	Rounds	Ref.
(Denmark) Mascot Motorsport	Honda Civic Type R TCR (FL5)	6	(Denmark) Kasper Jensen		All	
(Denmark) Mascot Motorsport	Honda Civic Type R TCR (FL5)	24	(Denmark) Malte Ebdrup	U	All	
(Denmark) Dall Racing	Honda Civic Type R TCR (FK7)	11	(Denmark) Mathias Dall	U	All	
(Denmark) Dall Racing	Honda Civic Type R TCR (FK7)	12	(Denmark) Magnus Dall	Am	All	
(Denmark) Insight Racing	Hyundai i30 N TCR	22	(Denmark) Marco Dahl	U	All	
(Denmark) DM Racing	Honda Civic Type R TCR (FK7)	23	(Denmark) Jan Magnussen		2–4, 6	
(Denmark) DM Racing	Hyundai i30 N TCR	33	(Denmark) Lars Højris Nielsen	Am	1	
(Denmark) DM Racing	Honda Civic Type R TCR (FK7)	33	(Denmark) Lars Højris Nielsen	Am	2–5	
(Sweden) TPR Motorsport	Honda Civic Type R TCR (FL5)	41	(Denmark) René Junker Povlsen	Am	1–5	
(Sweden) TPR Motorsport	Honda Civic Type R TCR (FL5)	77	(Germany) Mike Halder		1–5	
(Denmark) Wunderov Motortsport	Honda Civic Type R TCR (FK7)	50	(Denmark) Jacob Wunderov	Am	1	
(Denmark) Team Low Budget	Cupra León Competición TCR	428	(Denmark) Oliver Larsen	U	6	

Icon	Class
U	U25/Drivers below 25
Am	Amateur

== Calendar and results ==
Rnd.		Circuit	Date	Pole position	Fastest lap	Winning driver	Winning team	U25 winner	Am winner
1	R1	Padborg Park	26–27 April	(Denmark) Malte Ebdrup	(Denmark) Kasper Jensen	(Germany) Mike Halder	(Sweden) TPR Motorsport	(Denmark) Malte Ebdrup	(Denmark) Jacob Wunderov
1	R2	Padborg Park	26–27 April		(Denmark) Kasper Jensen	(Denmark) Kasper Jensen	(Denmark) Mascot Motorsport	(Denmark) Malte Ebdrup	(Denmark) Jacob Wunderov
1	R3	Padborg Park	26–27 April		(Denmark) Kasper Jensen	(Denmark) Kasper Jensen	(Denmark) Mascot Motorsport	(Denmark) Malte Ebdrup	(Denmark) René Junker Povlsen
2	R4	Jyllandsringen	10–11 May	(Denmark) Malte Ebdrup	(Denmark) Malte Ebdrup	(Denmark) Malte Ebdrup	(Denmark) Mascot Motorsport	(Denmark) Malte Ebdrup	(Denmark) Lars Højris Nielsen
2	R5	Jyllandsringen	10–11 May		(Denmark) Malte Ebdrup	(Germany) Mike Halder	(Sweden) TPR Motorsport	(Denmark) Malte Ebdrup	(Denmark) René Junker Povlsen
2	R6	Jyllandsringen	10–11 May		(Denmark) Malte Ebdrup	(Germany) Mike Halder	(Sweden) TPR Motorsport	(Denmark) Malte Ebdrup	(Denmark) René Junker Povlsen
3	R7	Ring Djursland	21–22 June	(Germany) Mike Halder	(Denmark) Malte Ebdrup	(Germany) Mike Halder	(Sweden) TPR Motorsport	(Denmark) Malte Ebdrup	(Denmark) René Junker Povlsen
3	R8	Ring Djursland	21–22 June		(Germany) Mike Halder	(Denmark) Jan Magnussen	(Denmark) DM Racing	(Denmark) Malte Ebdrup	(Denmark) Lars Højris Nielsen
3	R9	Ring Djursland	21–22 June		(Germany) Mike Halder	(Germany) Mike Halder	(Sweden) TPR Motorsport	(Denmark) Malte Ebdrup	(Denmark) René Junker Povlsen
4	R10	Copenhagen	8–10 August	(Denmark) Malte Ebdrup	(Denmark) Kasper Jensen	(Germany) Mike Halder	(Sweden) TPR Motorsport	(Denmark) Malte Ebdrup	(Denmark) Lars Højris Nielsen
4	R11	Copenhagen	8–10 August		(Germany) Mike Halder	(Denmark) Malte Ebdrup	(Denmark) Mascot Motorsport	(Denmark) Malte Ebdrup	(Denmark) René Junker Povlsen
4	R12	Copenhagen	8–10 August		(Denmark) Kasper Jensen	(Denmark) Malte Ebdrup	(Denmark) Mascot Motorsport	(Denmark) Malte Ebdrup	(Denmark) Magnus Dall
5	R13	Jyllandsringen	23–24 August	(Denmark) Malte Ebdrup	(Denmark) Kasper Jensen	(Denmark) Kasper Jensen	(Denmark) Mascot Motorsport	(Denmark) Malte Ebdrup	(Denmark) René Junker Povlsen
5	R14	Jyllandsringen	23–24 August		(Denmark) Kasper Jensen	(Denmark) Kasper Jensen	(Denmark) Mascot Motorsport	(Denmark) Malte Ebdrup	(Denmark) René Junker Povlsen
5	R15	Jyllandsringen	23–24 August		(Denmark) Kasper Jensen	(Denmark) Kasper Jensen	(Denmark) Mascot Motorsport	(Denmark) Malte Ebdrup	(Denmark) Magnus Dall
6	R16	Padborg Park	12–13 September	(Denmark) Kasper Jensen	(Denmark) Malte Ebdrup	(Denmark) Malte Ebdrup	(Denmark) Mascot Motorsport	(Denmark) Malte Ebdrup	(Denmark) Magnus Dall
6	R17	Padborg Park	12–13 September		(Denmark) Malte Ebdrup	(Denmark) Malte Ebdrup	(Denmark) Mascot Motorsport	(Denmark) Malte Ebdrup	(Denmark) Magnus Dall
6	R18	Padborg Park	12–13 September		(Denmark) Kasper Jensen	(Denmark) Kasper Jensen	(Denmark) Mascot Motorsport	(Denmark) Malte Ebdrup	(Denmark) Magnus Dall

== Championship Standings ==
Scoring system

Points are awarded to the top 16 finishers or those who complete more than 75% of the race will earn points. Points are also awarded based on qualifying position in this order; 6-5-4-3-2-1.

Overall

Position	**1st**	**2nd**	**3rd**	**4th**	**5th**	**6th**	**7th**	**8th**	**9th**	**10th**	**11th**	**12th**	**13th**	**14th**	**15th**	Fastest lap
Race	30	26	23	21	19	17	15	13	11	9	7	5	3	2	1	2

Am & U25

Position	**1st**	**2nd**	**3rd**	**4th**	**5th**	**6th**	**7th**
Race	13	10	8	6	4	2	1

=== Drivers' Championship ===
==== Overall ====
Pos.	Driver	PDB1			JYL1			DJU			COP			JYL2			PDB2			Pts.
Pos.	Driver	RD1	RD2	RD3	RD1	RD2	RD3	RD1	RD2	RD3	RD1	RD2	RD3	RD1	RD2	RD3	RD1	RD2	RD3	Pts.
1	(Denmark) Malte Ebdrup	**3**	2	3	**1**	2	2	2	4	2	**3**	1	1	**2**	2	3	1	1	2	499
2	(Denmark) Kasper Jensen	2	1	1	4	3	3	3	2	3	2	3	2	1	1	1	**2**	Ret	1	469
3	(Germany) Mike Halder	1	3	2	2	1	1	**1**	3	1	1	2	8	DNS	3	2				383.5
4	(Denmark) Mathias Dall	6	6	6	7	5	5	5	5	6	7	7	4	3	5	4	4	3	4	331.5
5	(Denmark) René Junker Povlsen	5	5	4	6	4	4	4	8	5	6	5	7	4	4	7				271.5
6	(Denmark) Marco Dahl	8	7	7	DNS	7	7	6	6	8	9	DNS	6	5	7	6	5	4	6	250.5
7	(Denmark) Jan Magnussen				3	Ret	Ret	7	1	4	4	4	3				3	2	3	237
8	(Denmark) Magnus Dall	7	8	Ret	8	DNS	DNS	8	9	9	8	6	5	6	6	5	7	6	5	221.5
9	(Denmark) Lars Højris Nielsen	DNS	DNS	DNS	5	6	6	Ret	7	7	5	8	DNS	7	8	DNS				131
10	(Denmark) Jacob Wunderov	4	4	5																63
11	(Denmark) Oliver Larsen																6	5	7	51
Pos.	Driver	PDB1			JYL1			DJU			COP			JYL2			PDB2			Pts.

Colour	Result
Gold	Winner
Silver	Second place
Bronze	Third place
Green	Points classification
Blue	Non-points classification
Blue	Non-classified finish (NC)
Purple	Retired, not classified (Ret)
Red	Did not qualify (DNQ)
Red	Did not pre-qualify (DNPQ)
Black	Disqualified (DSQ)
White	Did not start (DNS)
White	Withdrew (WD)
White	Race cancelled (C)
Blank	Did not practice (DNP)
Blank	Did not arrive (DNA)
Blank	Excluded (EX)

**Bold** – Pole
Italics – Fastest Lap

==== Am ====
Pos.	Driver	PDB1			JYL1			DJU			COP			JYL2			PDB2			Pts.
Pos.	Driver	RD1	RD2	RD3	RD1	RD2	RD3	RD1	RD2	RD3	RD1	RD2	RD3	RD1	RD2	RD3	RD1	RD2	RD3	Pts.
1	(Denmark) René Junker Povlsen	5	5	4	6	4	4	4	8	5	6	5	7	4	4	7				174
2	(Denmark) Magnus Dall	7	8	Ret	8	DNS	DNS	8	9	9	8	6	5	6	6	5	7	6	5	143
3	(Denmark) Lars Højris Nielsen	DNS	DNS	DNS	5	6	6	Ret	7	7	5	8	DNS	7	8	DNS				85
4	(Denmark) Jacob Wunderov	4	4	5																36
Pos.	Driver	PDB1			JYL1			DJU			COP			JYL2			PDB2			Pts.

Colour	Result
Gold	Winner
Silver	Second place
Bronze	Third place
Green	Points classification
Blue	Non-points classification
Blue	Non-classified finish (NC)
Purple	Retired, not classified (Ret)
Red	Did not qualify (DNQ)
Red	Did not pre-qualify (DNPQ)
Black	Disqualified (DSQ)
White	Did not start (DNS)
White	Withdrew (WD)
White	Race cancelled (C)
Blank	Did not practice (DNP)
Blank	Did not arrive (DNA)
Blank	Excluded (EX)

==== U25 ====
Pos.	Driver	PDB1			JYL1			DJU			COP			JYL2			PDB2			Pts.
Pos.	Driver	RD1	RD2	RD3	RD1	RD2	RD3	RD1	RD2	RD3	RD1	RD2	RD3	RD1	RD2	RD3	RD1	RD2	RD3	Pts.
1	(Denmark) Malte Ebdrup	3	2	3	1	2	2	2	4	2	3	1	1	2	2	3	1	1	2	234
2	(Denmark) Mathias Dall	6	6	6	7	5	5	5	5	6	7	7	4	3	5	4	4	3	4	180
3	(Denmark) Marco Dahl	8	7	7	DNS	7	7	6	6	8	9	DNS	6	5	7	6	5	4	6	128
4	(Denmark) Oliver Larsen																6	5	7	181
Pos.	Driver	PDB1			JYL1			DJU			COP			JYL2			PDB2			Pts.

Colour	Result
Gold	Winner
Silver	Second place
Bronze	Third place
Green	Points classification
Blue	Non-points classification
Blue	Non-classified finish (NC)
Purple	Retired, not classified (Ret)
Red	Did not qualify (DNQ)
Red	Did not pre-qualify (DNPQ)
Black	Disqualified (DSQ)
White	Did not start (DNS)
White	Withdrew (WD)
White	Race cancelled (C)
Blank	Did not practice (DNP)
Blank	Did not arrive (DNA)
Blank	Excluded (EX)
