= 2026 24 Hours of Spa =

79th 24 Hours of Spa endurance race

(Belgium) 2026 24 Hours of Spa
Event information
- Round 3 of 5 in the 2026 Intercontinental GT Challenge; Round 3 of 5 in the 2026 GT World Challenge Europe Endurance Cup
- Date: 25–28 June 2026
- Location: Spa-Francorchamps, Wallonia, Belgium
- Venue: Circuit de Spa-Francorchamps
- Duration: 24 Hours

Results
- Laps completed: 541
- Distance: 3,789.16 km (2,354.47 mi)

Pole position
- Time: 2:18.330
- Team: (Italy) AF Corse
- Drivers: (Italy) Alessio Rovera

Winners
- Time: 24:00:51.689
- Team: (Germany) Lionspeed GP
- Drivers: (Switzerland) Ricardo Feller (Austria) Thomas Preining (Denmark) Bastian Buus

The 2026 24 Hours of Spa (also known as the CrowdStrike 24 Hours of Spa due to sponsorship reasons) was the 79th running of the 24 Hours of Spa. The race took place from 27 to 28 June 2026. The race was part of both the 2026 GT World Challenge Europe Endurance Cup and the 2026 Intercontinental GT Challenge.

== Background ==
Supporting the race weekend will be the GT4 European Series, GT3 Legends, McLaren Trophy Europe, as well as Lamborghini Super Trofeo Europe.

== Entry list ==
A 69-car field is listed for the race — 18 in Pro class, 8 in Gold Cup, 17 in Silver Cup, 16 in Bronze Cup and 10 in Pro-Am Cup. 10 manufacturers will be represented, with 15 Porsche cars, 11 Mercedes cars, 8 BMW cars, 8 Ferrari cars, 8 McLaren cars, 7 Aston Martin cars, 6 Audi cars, 2 Corvette cars, 2 Ford cars, and the debut for the Lamborghini Temerario with 2 cars listed.

Afiq Ikhwan Yazid, Kenzie Beecroft, Luciano Morano and Daniel Gaunt provisionally entered the 24 Hours of Spa for Johor Motorsports Racing JMR, Car Collection Motorsport, Team RJN and Tsunami RT respectively, but were later replaced by Jordan Love, Reinhold Krahn, Wyatt Brichacek and Hiroshi Hamaguchi. Laurin Heinrich, who had joined Schumacher CLRT for the race, later opted to contest IMSA's 6 Hours of Watkins Glen instead, and was replaced by Frédéric Makowiecki. Vanina Ickx and Paul Meijer, who were listed in the No. 123 Mühlner Porsche, stepped down after the Prologue. Era Motorsport was a late withdrawal from the 24 Hours of Spa. Jake Hill and team owner Kyle Tilley had been confirmed in the No. 81 Porsche 911 GT3 R (992.2) in Bronze Cup.

No.	Entrant	Car	Driver 1	Driver 2	Driver 3	Driver 4
Pro (18 entries)
2	(Belgium) Boutsen VDS	Porsche 911 GT3 R (992.2)	(France) Dorian Boccolacci	(Belgium) Alessio Picariello	(Netherlands) Morris Schuring	
3	(Netherlands) Mercedes-AMG Team Verstappen Racing	Mercedes-AMG GT3 Evo	(Andorra) Jules Gounon	(Spain) Daniel Juncadella	(United Kingdom) Chris Lulham	
7	(Belgium) Comtoyou Racing	Aston Martin Vantage AMR GT3 Evo	(Italy) Mattia Drudi	(Denmark) Marco Sørensen	(Denmark) Nicki Thiim	
17	(Germany) Mercedes-AMG Team GetSpeed	Mercedes-AMG GT3 Evo	(Germany) Maximilian Götz	(Belgium) Maxime Martin	(Germany) Fabian Schiller	
22	(France) Schumacher CLRT	Porsche 911 GT3 R (992.2)	(Australia) Matt Campbell	(Turkey) Ayhancan Güven	(France) Frédéric Makowiecki	
32	(Belgium) Team WRT	BMW M4 GT3 Evo	(South Africa) Jordan Pepper	(South Africa) Kelvin van der Linde	(Belgium) Charles Weerts	
34	(Germany) natural elements by Walkenhorst Motorsport	Aston Martin Vantage AMR GT3 Evo	(Portugal) Henrique Chaves	(United Arab Emirates) Jamie Day	(Norway) Christian Krognes	
46	(Belgium) Team WRT	BMW M4 GT3 Evo	(United Kingdom) Dan Harper	(Germany) Max Hesse	(Italy) Valentino Rossi	
48	(United States) Mercedes-AMG Team Mann-Filter	Mercedes-AMG GT3 Evo	(Austria) Lucas Auer	(Germany) Maro Engel	(Germany) Luca Stolz	
50	(Italy) AF Corse	Ferrari 296 GT3 Evo	(Indonesia) Sean Gelael	(Monaco) Arthur Leclerc	(France) Lilou Wadoux	
51	(Italy) AF Corse	Ferrari 296 GT3 Evo	(Italy) Tommaso Mosca	(Denmark) Nicklas Nielsen	(Italy) Alessio Rovera	
59	(United Kingdom) Garage 59	McLaren 720S GT3 Evo	(Germany) Marvin Kirchhöfer	(United Kingdom) Joseph Loake	(United Kingdom) Dean Macdonald	
63	(Austria) TGI Team by GRT	Lamborghini Temerario GT3	(Italy) Mirko Bortolotti	(Germany) Maximilian Paul	(France) Franck Perera	
64	(Germany) HRT Ford Racing	Ford Mustang GT3 Evo	(France) Thomas Drouet	(India) Arjun Maini	(Switzerland) Fabio Scherer	
80	(Germany) Lionspeed GP	Porsche 911 GT3 R (992.2)	(Denmark) Bastian Buus	(Switzerland) Ricardo Feller	(Austria) Thomas Preining	
84	(Austria) Eastalent Racing	Audi R8 LMS Evo II	(Germany) Christopher Haase	(Austria) Simon Reicher	(Germany) Markus Winkelhock	
96	(Germany) Rutronik Racing	Lamborghini Temerario GT3	(Germany) Luca Engstler	(Italy) Marco Mapelli	(Switzerland) Patric Niederhauser	
98	(Germany) ROWE Racing	BMW M4 GT3 Evo	(United Kingdom) Jake Dennis	(Brazil) Augusto Farfus	(Switzerland) Raffaele Marciello	
Gold (8 entries)
4	(United Kingdom) Optimum Motorsport	McLaren 720S GT3 Evo	(United Kingdom) Harry George	(Netherlands) Ruben del Sarte	(United Kingdom) Adam Smalley	(United Kingdom) Freddie Tomlinson
10	(Belgium) Boutsen VDS	Porsche 911 GT3 R (992.2)	(France) Alessandro Ghiretti	(Sweden) Robin Knutsson	(Belgium) Gilles Magnus	
24	(United Kingdom) Steller Motorsport	Chevrolet Corvette Z06 GT3.R	(France) Antoine Doquin	(Denmark) Dennis Lind	(Denmark) Mikkel Gaarde Pedersen	(Germany) Lenny Ried
58	(United Kingdom) Garage 59	McLaren 720S GT3 Evo	(United Kingdom) Tom Fleming	(Germany) Benjamin Goethe	(Monaco) Louis Prette	
71	(Denmark) Selected Car Racing	Ferrari 296 GT3 Evo	(Denmark) Simon Birch	(Denmark) Malte Ebdrup	(Denmark) Conrad Laursen	(Denmark) Frederik Schandorff
99	(Germany) Tresor Attempto Racing	Audi R8 LMS Evo II	(Germany) Alex Aka	(Italy) Andrea Frassineti	(Luxembourg) Dylan Pereira	
111	(France) CSA Racing	McLaren 720S GT3 Evo	(France) Simon Gachet	(United Kingdom) James Kell	(France) Jim Pla	(France) Arthur Rougier
998	(Germany) ROWE Racing	BMW M4 GT3 Evo	(Belgium) Ugo de Wilde	(Germany) Jens Klingmann	(Germany) Tim Tramnitz	
Silver (17 entries)
5	(United Kingdom) Optimum Motorsport	McLaren 720S GT3 Evo	(Portugal) Guilherme Oliveira	(Germany) Salman Owega	(United Kingdom) Mikey Porter	(Netherlands) Dante Rappange
6	(United States) GetSpeed Team Bartone Bros	Mercedes-AMG GT3 Evo	(United States) Anthony Bartone	(Poland) Karol Basz	(France) César Gazeau	(France) Aurélien Panis
9	(Lithuania) Pure Rxcing	Porsche 911 GT3 R (992.2)	(Austria) Max Hofer	(United Kingdom) Alex Malykhin (Note: Malykhin is Belarusian, but he competes under a British licence as Belarusian national emblems were banned by the FIA following the Russian invasion of Ukraine.)	(Slovenia) Alexey Nesov (Note: Salikhov is Russian, but he competes as a neutral competitor as Russian national emblems were banned by the FIA following the Russian invasion of Ukraine. Nesov, also Russian, compete under Slovene licence for the same reason.)	(Italy) Enzo Trulli
20	(Austria) Team Motopark	Mercedes-AMG GT3 Evo	(Angola) Rui Andrade	(Australia) Christian Mansell	(Switzerland) Yannick Mettler	(Hungary) Levente Révész
21	(Belgium) Comtoyou Racing	Aston Martin Vantage AMR GT3 Evo	(France) Sébastien Baud	(France) Arthur Dorison	(Belgium) Kobe Pauwels	(Sweden) Oliver Söderström
23	(United Kingdom) Team RJN	McLaren 720S GT3 Evo	(United States) Wyatt Brichacek	(Germany) Ben Dörr	(United Kingdom) Horatio Fitz-Simon	(United Kingdom) Max Lynn
25	(France) Saintéloc Racing	Audi R8 LMS Evo II	(France) Étienne Cheli	(Ukraine) Ivan Klymenko	(France) Lucas Légeret	(Argentina) Ezequiel Pérez Companc
30	(Belgium) Team WRT	BMW M4 GT3 Evo	(Belgium) Amaury Cordeel	(Belgium) Mathieu Detry	(Belgium) Matisse Lismont	(Argentina) Ignacio Montenegro
35	(Germany) Walkenhorst Motorsport	Aston Martin Vantage AMR GT3 Evo	(Switzerland) Ethan Ischer	(France) Maxime Robin	(France) Gaspard Simon	(Ecuador) Mateo Villagómez
44	(United Kingdom) Greystone GT	McLaren 720S GT3 Evo	(Australia) Jayden Kelly	(United Kingdom) Zac Meakin	(Spain) Tommy Pintos	(United Kingdom) Josh Rattican
45	(Germany) Rinaldi Racing	Ferrari 296 GT3 Evo	(Italy) Alessandro Balzan	(Spain) Rafael Durán	(United States) Dylan Medler	(South Africa) David Perel
52	(Italy) AF Corse	Ferrari 296 GT3 Evo	(Italy) Francesco Braschi	(Belgium) Jef Machiels	(Belgium) Gilles Stadsbader	(Peru) Matías Zagazeta
54	(Italy) Dinamic GT	Porsche 911 GT3 R (992.2)	(France) Loris Cabirou	(Thailand) Tanart Sathienthirakul	(Italy) Francesco Simonazzi	(United Kingdom) Angus Whiteside
65	(Germany) HRT Ford Racing	Ford Mustang GT3 Evo	(Philippines) Eduardo Coseteng	(Germany) Max Reis	(Netherlands) Maxime Oosten	(Germany) Finn Wiebelhaus
66	(Germany) Tresor Attempto Racing	Audi R8 LMS Evo II	(Slovenia) Mark Kastelic	(Israel) Ariel Levi	(Italy) Rocco Mazzola	(Denmark) Sebastian Øgaard
555	(France) CSA Racing	McLaren 720S GT3 Evo	(France) Romain Andriolo	(Belgium) Lorens Lecertua	(Belgium) Baptiste Moulin	(India) Sai Sanjay
992	(United Kingdom) Paradine Competition	BMW M4 GT3 Evo	(Mexico) Ian Aguilera	(Brazil) Christian Hahn	(Netherlands) Jop Rappange	(United Kingdom) Josh Rowledge
Bronze (16 entries)
11	(Belgium) Comtoyou Racing	Aston Martin Vantage AMR GT3 Evo	(Italy) Felice Jelmini	(Canada) Kyle Marcelli	(United States) AJ Muss	(Brazil) Marcelo Tomasoni
12	(United Arab Emirates) GetSpeed Team Dubai	Mercedes-AMG GT3 Evo	(Canada) Mikaël Grenier	(Germany) Tom Kalender	(Luxembourg) Gabriel Rindone	(South Africa) Jarrod Waberski
33	(Bahrain) 2 Seas Motorsport	Mercedes-AMG GT3 Evo	(United States) Jason Hart	(United States) Scott Noble	(United Kingdom) Aaron Walker	(United Kingdom) Lewis Williamson
42	Oman Racing by Century Motorsport	BMW M4 GT3 Evo	(Oman) Ahmad Al Harthy	(Brazil) Pedro Ebrahim	(Spain) Javier Sagrera	(Australia) Calan Williams
56	(United Kingdom) Ecurie Ecosse Blackthorn	Aston Martin Vantage AMR GT3 Evo	(United Kingdom) Jonny Adam	(United Kingdom) Lorcan Hanafin	(France) Romain Leroux	(Italy) Giacomo Petrobelli
60	(United Kingdom) JMW Motorsport	Ferrari 296 GT3 Evo	(Germany) Tim Heinemann	(Switzerland) Rolf Ineichen	(Germany) Thomas Kiefer	(France) Pierre-Louis Chovet
74	(Switzerland) Kessel Racing	Ferrari 296 GT3 Evo	(United States) Dustin Blattner	(France) Mathys Jaubert	(Germany) Dennis Marschall	(United Kingdom) Ben Tuck
87	(United States) Winward Racing	Mercedes-AMG GT3 Evo	(Germany) Marvin Dienst	(Italy) Gabriele Piana	(Netherlands) "Daan Arrow"	Rinat Salikhov
88	(Germany) Tresor Attempto Racing	Audi R8 LMS Evo II	(Italy) Daniele Di Amato	(Greece) Georgios Kolovos	(Germany) Carrie Schreiner	(Brazil) Sérgio Sette Câmara
89	(Germany) Lionspeed GP	Porsche 911 GT3 R (992.2)	(Switzerland) Alex Fontana	(Zimbabwe) Axcil Jefferies	(Germany) Patrick Kolb	(Canada) Bashar Mardini
91	(Germany) Herberth Motorsport	Porsche 911 GT3 R (992.2)	(Germany) Ralf Bohn	(Netherlands) Huub van Eijndhoven	(France) Mathieu Jaminet	(Germany) Robert Renauer
93	(United Kingdom) Ziggo Sport – Tempesta Racing	Porsche 911 GT3 R (992.2)	(Italy) Eddie Cheever III	(United Kingdom) Chris Froggatt	(Hong Kong) Jonathan Hui	(Netherlands) Mex Jansen
97	(Germany) Rutronik Racing	Porsche 911 GT3 R (992.2)	(Hong Kong) Antares Au	(Denmark) Michelle Gatting	(Germany) Sven Müller	(Estonia) Martin Rump
123	(Belgium) Mühlner Motorsport	Porsche 911 GT3 R (992.2)	(Belgium) Armand Fumal	(Australia) Bayley Hall	(Australia) Andres Latorre Canon	(Germany) Tobias Müller
222	(Bahrain) 2 Seas Motorsport	Mercedes-AMG GT3 Evo	(Republic of Ireland) Reece Barr	(United Kingdom) Charles Dawson	(United Kingdom) Kiern Jewiss	(Australia) Garnet Patterson
991	(United Kingdom) Paradine Competition	BMW M4 GT3 Evo	(South Africa) Leyton Fourie	(United Kingdom) James Kellett	(United Kingdom) Darren Leung	(United Kingdom) David Pittard
Pro-Am (10 entries)
0	(Malaysia) Johor Motorsports Racing JMR	Chevrolet Corvette Z06 GT3.R	(United Kingdom) Ben Green	(Australia) Jordan Love	(Malaysia) Prince Abu Bakar Ibrahim	(Malaysia) Prince Jefri Ibrahim
8	(Germany) Car Collection Motorsport	Porsche 911 GT3 R (992.2)	(Canada) Reinhold Krahn	(Switzerland) Nicolò Rosi	(Italy) Niccolò Schirò	(Germany) Joel Sturm
28	(Antigua and Barbuda) HAAS RT	Audi R8 LMS Evo II	(Belgium) Simon Balcaen	(Belgium) Mathieu Castelein	(Belgium) Pierre Castelein	(France) Steven Palette
70	(Italy) AF Corse	Ferrari 296 GT3 Evo	(Republic of Ireland) Peter Dempsey	(Spain) Miguel Molina	(Brazil) Custodio Toledo	(France) Matthieu Vaxivière
79	(San Marino) Tsunami RT	Porsche 911 GT3 R (992.2)	(Italy) Fabio Babini	(Japan) Hiroshi Hamaguchi	(Germany) Nico Menzel	(Italy) Johannes Zelger
86	(Denmark) High Class Racing	Porsche 911 GT3 R (992.2)	(Denmark) Anders Fjordbach	(China) Kerong Li	(China) Leo Ye Hongli	(China) Yuan Bo
177	(Belgium) Grupo Prom Racing Team	Mercedes-AMG GT3 Evo	(Netherlands) Colin Caresani	(United Kingdom) Adam Christodoulou	(Mexico) Alfredo Hernández	(France) Stéphane Tribaudini
700	(Belgium) Comtoyou Racing	Aston Martin Vantage AMR GT3 Evo	(Belgium) Nicolas Baert	(Belgium) Sarah Bovy	(Belgium) Xavier Knauf	(Belgium) Grégory Servais
914	(Austria) Razoon – more than racing	Porsche 911 GT3 R (992.2)	(United Kingdom) Kenzie Beecroft	(Thailand) Carl Bennett	(Australia) Bryce Fullwood	(United Kingdom) Edward McDermott
999	(Germany) GetSpeed Team PCX	Mercedes-AMG GT3 Evo	(France) Jordan Boisson	(France) Patrick Charlaix	(France) Marvin Klein	(Belgium) Benjamin Paque

== Qualifying ==
Qualifying sessions was held on Thursday, 25 June at 19:45 CEST. Qualifying is divided into four sessions, where entries must nominate each of their drivers to each session (three-drivers entries skipped Q1). Top 32 in average of session best times advanced to Superpole.

Pos.	Class	No.	Team	Car	Q1	Q2	Q3	Q4	Average	Grid
1	Pro	51	(Italy) AF Corse	Ferrari 296 GT3 Evo		**2:17.012**	2:17.156	2:17.038	2:17.068	SP
2	Pro	80	(Germany) Lionspeed GP	Porsche 911 GT3 R (992.2)		2:17.307	2:16.933	2:17.084	2:17.108	SP
3	Pro	2	(Belgium) Boutsen VDS	Porsche 911 GT3 R (992.2)		2:17.269	2:17.237	2:16.989	2:17.164	SP
4	Pro	50	(Italy) AF Corse	Ferrari 296 GT3 Evo		2:17.110	2:17.180	2:17.297	2:17.195	SP
5	Pro	48	(United States) Mercedes-AMG Team Mann-Filter	Mercedes-AMG GT3 Evo		2:17.175	2:17.147	2:17.409	2:17.243	SP
6	Pro	59	(United Kingdom) Garage 59	McLaren 720S GT3 Evo		2:17.142	2:17.142	2:17.532	2:17.272	SP
7	Pro	3	(Netherlands) Mercedes-AMG Team Verstappen Racing	Mercedes-AMG GT3 Evo		2:17.478	2:17.344	2:17.057	2:17.293	SP
8	Pro	7	(Belgium) Comtoyou Racing	Aston Martin Vantage AMR GT3 Evo		2:17.134	2:17.497	2:17.293	2:17.308	SP
9	Gold	58	(United Kingdom) Garage 59	McLaren 720S GT3 Evo		2:17.196	2:17.540	2:17.357	2:17.364	SP
10	Gold	99	(Germany) Tresor Attempto Racing	Audi R8 LMS Evo II		2:17.908	2:17.459	**2:16.969**	2:17.445	SP
11	Pro	64	(Germany) HRT Ford Racing	Ford Mustang GT3 Evo		2:17.425	2:17.415	2:17.582	2:17.474	SP
12	Gold	71	(Denmark) Selected Car Racing	Ferrari 296 GT3 Evo	2:18.366	2:17.418	2:17.002	2:17.190	2:17.494	SP
13	Pro	22	(France) Schumacher CLRT	Porsche 911 GT3 R (992.2)		2:17.546	2:17.396	2:17.629	2:17.523	SP
14	Silver	5	(United Kingdom) Optimum Motorsport	McLaren 720S GT3 Evo	**2:17.867**	2:18.177	2:16.886	2:17.452	2:17.595	SP
15	Pro	32	(Belgium) Team WRT	BMW M4 GT3 Evo		2:17.698	2:17.565	2:17.551	2:17.604	SP
16	Silver	25	(France) Saintéloc Racing	Audi R8 LMS Evo II	2:18.462	2:17.951	2:17.239	2:17.255	2:17.724	SP
17	Pro	98	(Germany) ROWE Racing	BMW M4 GT3 Evo		2:17.841	2:17.914	2:17.605	2:17.786	SP
18	Gold	10	(Belgium) Boutsen VDS	Porsche 911 GT3 R (992.2)		2:17.676	2:18.542	2:17.275	2:17.831	SP
19	Pro	34	(Germany) natural elements by Walkenhorst Motorsport	Aston Martin Vantage AMR GT3 Evo		2:18.209	2:17.584	2:17.711	2:17.834	SP
20	Silver	6	(United States) GetSpeed Team Bartone Bros	Mercedes-AMG GT3 Evo	2:19.310	2:17.628	**2:16.855**	2:17.612	2:17.851	SP
21	Pro	46	(Belgium) Team WRT	BMW M4 GT3 Evo		2:18.067	2:17.840	2:17.923	2:17.943	SP
22	Gold	998	(Germany) ROWE Racing	BMW M4 GT3 Evo		2:17.975	2:18.225	2:17.761	2:17.987	SP
23	Pro	63	(Austria) TGI Team by GRT	Lamborghini Temerario GT3		2:18.542	2:17.976	2:17.624	2:18.047	SP
24	Silver	66	(Germany) Tresor Attempto Racing	Audi R8 LMS Evo II	2:19.845	2:17.757	2:17.406	2:17.281	2:18.072	SP
25	Gold	4	(United Kingdom) Optimum Motorsport	McLaren 720S GT3 Evo	2:18.552	2:18.280	2:17.935	2:17.789	2:18.139	SP
26	Pro	96	(Germany) Rutronik Racing	Lamborghini Temerario GT3		2:18.703	2:18.100	2:17.912	2:18.238	SP
27	Bronze	74	(Switzerland) Kessel Racing	Ferrari 296 GT3 Evo	2:20.332	2:18.834	2:17.257	2:17.370	2:18.448	SP
28	Silver	44	(United Kingdom) Greystone GT	McLaren 720S GT3 Evo	2:19.031	2:18.977	2:17.844	2:18.167	2:18.504	SP
29	Silver	52	(Italy) AF Corse	Ferrari 296 GT3 Evo	2:19.643	2:18.486	2:17.997	2:17.943	2:18.517	SP
30	Silver	20	(Austria) Team Motopark	Mercedes-AMG GT3 Evo	2:19.314	2:18.256	2:17.939	2:18.599	2:18.527	SP
31	Silver	45	(Germany) Rinaldi Racing	Ferrari 296 GT3 Evo	2:19.745	2:19.078	2:17.712	2:17.611	2:18.536	SP
32	Silver	23	(United Kingdom) Team RJN	McLaren 720S GT3 Evo	2:19.333	2:18.813	2:18.604	2:17.546	2:18.574	SP
33	Bronze	87	(United States) Winward Racing	Mercedes-AMG GT3 Evo	2:19.663	2:19.218	2:18.182	2:17.333	2:18.599	32
34	Silver	21	(Belgium) Comtoyou Racing	Aston Martin Vantage AMR GT3 Evo	2:19.485	2:18.745	2:17.967	2:18.247	2:18.611	33
35	Silver	54	(Italy) Dinamic GT	Porsche 911 GT3 R (992.2)	2:18.600	2:18.410	2:19.080	2:18.364	2:18.613	34
36	Silver	35	(Germany) Walkenhorst Motorsport	Aston Martin Vantage AMR GT3 Evo	2:19.629	2:18.733	2:18.105	2:18.399	2:18.716	35
37	Silver	555	(France) CSA Racing	McLaren 720S GT3 Evo	2:20.180	2:18.898	2:18.425	2:17.764	2:18.816	36
38	Gold	24	(United Kingdom) Steller Motorsport	Chevrolet Corvette Z06 GT3.R	2:19.265	2:18.825	2:19.300	2:18.021	2:18.852	37
39	Silver	30	(Belgium) Team WRT	BMW M4 GT3 Evo	2:19.550	2:19.068	2:18.632	2:18.324	2:18.893	38
40	Silver	992	(United Kingdom) Paradine Competition	BMW M4 GT3 Evo	2:20.372	2:19.251	2:18.536	2:18.252	2:19.102	39
41	Bronze	222	(Bahrain) 2 Seas Motorsport	Mercedes-AMG GT3 Evo	2:19.849	2:19.873	2:18.936	2:17.783	2:19.110	40
42	Silver	9	(Lithuania) Pure Rxcing	Porsche 911 GT3 R (992.2)	2:20.160	2:19.184	2:19.262	2:18.670	2:19.319	PL
43	Bronze	42	Oman Racing by Century Motorsport	BMW M4 GT3 Evo	2:19.736	2:21.126	2:18.789	2:18.780	2:19.607	41
44	Bronze	91	(Germany) Herberth Motorsport	Porsche 911 GT3 R (992.2)	2:22.547	2:20.387	2:18.566	2:17.212	2:19.678	42
45	Pro-Am	86	(Denmark) High Class Racing	Porsche 911 GT3 R (992.2)	2:22.229	2:21.133	2:19.190	2:18.024	2:20.144	48 (Note: 5-place grid position penalty)
46	Bronze	88	(Germany) Tresor Attempto Racing	Audi R8 LMS Evo II	2:22.281	2:22.590	2:18.641	2:17.801	2:20.328	43
47	Bronze	93	(United Kingdom) Ziggo Sport – Tempesta Racing	Porsche 911 GT3 R (992.2)	2:19.151	2:25.605	2:18.621	2:18.005	2:20.345	50
48	Pro-Am	70	(Italy) AF Corse	Ferrari 296 GT3 Evo	2:21.574	2:23.301	2:18.726	2:18.307	2:20.477	44
49	Pro-Am	177	(Belgium) Grupo Prom Racing Team	Mercedes-AMG GT3 Evo	2:26.806	2:20.184	2:18.382	2:18.941	2:21.078	45
50	Pro-Am	28	(Antigua and Barbuda) HAAS RT	Audi R8 LMS Evo II	2:22.238	2:25.279	2:20.003	2:18.338	2:21.464	46
51	Pro-Am	999	(Germany) GetSpeed Team PCX	Mercedes-AMG GT3 Evo	2:32.561	2:22.477	2:18.032	2:17.409	2:22.619	47
52	Pro-Am	0	(Malaysia) Johor Motorsports Racing JMR	Chevrolet Corvette Z06 GT3.R	2:23.014	2:25.866	2:18.238	2:24.631	2:22.937	49
53	Pro-Am	8	(Germany) Car Collection Motorsport	Porsche 911 GT3 R (992.2)	2:32.003	2:25.582	2:17.614	2:17.502	2:23.175	65 (Note: 15-place grid position penalty)
54	Bronze	123	(Belgium) Mühlner Motorsport	Porsche 911 GT3 R (992.2)	2:20.329	2:20.363	2:29.280	2:31.372	2:25.336	51
55	Pro	17	(Germany) Mercedes-AMG Team GetSpeed	Mercedes-AMG GT3 Evo		2:17.122	No time (Note: No. 17 Mercedes-AMG Team GetSpeed had all of their Q3 times deleted due to unauthorized works on their car.)	2:16.817	2:16.969	52
56	Bronze	89	(Germany) Lionspeed GP	Porsche 911 GT3 R (992.2)	2:18.661	No time	2:17.925	2:18.198	2:18.261	53
57	Bronze	991	(United Kingdom) Paradine Competition	BMW M4 GT3 Evo	2:19.196	2:45.324	2:18.362	2:17.500	2:18.352	54
58	Bronze	97	(Germany) Rutronik Racing	Porsche 911 GT3 R (992.2)	2:20.227	No time	2:18.323	2:17.946	2:18.832	55
59	Bronze	60	(United Kingdom) JMW Motorsport	Ferrari 296 GT3 Evo	2:20.090	No time	2:18.249	2:18.313	2:18.884	56
60	Bronze	33	(Bahrain) 2 Seas Motorsport	Mercedes-AMG GT3 Evo	2:20.728	No time	2:18.922	2:18.281	2:19.310	62
61	Pro-Am	700	(Belgium) Comtoyou Racing	Aston Martin Vantage AMR GT3 Evo	2:22.117	2:19.962	No time (Note: No. 700 Comtoyou Racing had all of their Q3 times deleted due to pit lane infringement.)	2:18.816	2:20.298	57
62	Bronze	11	(Belgium) Comtoyou Racing	Aston Martin Vantage AMR GT3 Evo	2:30.265	No time	2:19.003	2:18.431	2:22.566	58
63	Pro-Am	914	(Austria) Razoon – more than racing	Porsche 911 GT3 R (992.2)	2:30.707	No time	2:21.137	2:23.441	2:25.095	59
64	Bronze	56	(United Kingdom) Ecurie Ecosse Blackthorn	Aston Martin Vantage AMR GT3 Evo	2:20.365	2:19.743	No time	No time	2:20.054	60
65	Pro-Am	79	(San Marino) Tsunami RT	Porsche 911 GT3 R (992.2)	2:24.486	No time	No time	No time	2:24.486	PL
NC	Pro	84	(Austria) Eastalent Racing	Audi R8 LMS Evo II	No time (Note: No. 84 Eastalent Racing had all of their Qualifying times deleted due to running with disconnected data logger.)				–	61
NC	Gold	111	(France) CSA Racing	McLaren 720S GT3 Evo	No time (Note: No. 111 CSA Racing had all of their Qualifying times deleted due to BoP non-compliance.)				–	63
DNS	Silver	65	(Germany) HRT Ford Racing	Ford Mustang GT3 Evo	Did not start				–	64
DNS	Bronze	12	(United Arab Emirates) GetSpeed Team Dubai	Mercedes-AMG GT3 Evo	Did not start				–	PL

=== Superpole ===
Superpole was held on Friday, 26 June at 15:05 CEST. Superpole was divided into 4 sessions: Top 32 cars from Qualifying sessions entered SP1, then top 16 advanced to SP2, then top 8 advanced to SP3, and finally top 4 advanced to SP4 to decide overall pole position.

Pole position entries in each class are denoted in bold.

Pos.	Class	No.	Team	Driver	Car	SP1	SP2	SP3	SP4	Grid
1	**Pro**	**51**	**(Italy) AF Corse**	**(Italy) Alessio Rovera**	**Ferrari 296 GT3 Evo**	**2:18.330**	**2:18.775**	**2:18.971**	**2:18.613**	1
2	**Gold**	**58**	**(United Kingdom) Garage 59**	**(United Kingdom) Tom Fleming**	**McLaren 720S GT3 Evo**	2:18.815	2:19.220	2:19.179	2:19.041	2
3	Pro	3	(Netherlands) Mercedes-AMG Team Verstappen Racing	(Andorra) Jules Gounon	Mercedes-AMG GT3 Evo	2:19.433	2:19.460	2:19.218	2:19.735	3
4	Gold	71	(Denmark) Selected Car Racing	(Denmark) Frederik Schandorff	Ferrari 296 GT3 Evo	2:19.338	2:19.411	2:19.257		4
5	**Bronze**	**74**	**(Switzerland) Kessel Racing**	**(Germany) Dennis Marschall**	**Ferrari 296 GT3 Evo**	2:19.437	2:19.468	2:19.307		5
6	Pro	48	(United States) Mercedes-AMG Team Mann-Filter	(Austria) Lucas Auer	Mercedes-AMG GT3 Evo	2:19.478	2:19.409	2:19.478		6
7	Pro	59	(United Kingdom) Garage 59	(Germany) Marvin Kirchhöfer	McLaren 720S GT3 Evo	2:19.617	2:19.567			7
8	Gold	99	(Germany) Tresor Attempto Racing	(Germany) Alex Aka	Audi R8 LMS Evo II	2:19.523	2:19.613			13 (Note: No. 99 Tresor Attempto Racing had a 5-place grid position penalty carried from the Monza round.)
9	**Silver**	**6**	**(United States) GetSpeed Team Bartone Bros**	**(France) César Gazeau**	**Mercedes-AMG GT3 Evo**	2:19.368	2:19.627			8
10	Pro	64	(Germany) HRT Ford Racing	(India) Arjun Maini	Ford Mustang GT3 Evo	2:19.428	2:19.644			9
11	Silver	45	(Germany) Rinaldi Racing	(South Africa) David Perel	Ferrari 296 GT3 Evo	2:19.614	2:19.852			10
12	Silver	23	(United Kingdom) Team RJN	(Germany) Ben Dörr	McLaren 720S GT3 Evo	2:19.552	2:19.893			11
13	Silver	5	(United Kingdom) Optimum Motorsport	(Portugal) Guilherme Oliveira	McLaren 720S GT3 Evo	2:19.558	2:19.920			12
14	Pro	80	(Germany) Lionspeed GP	(Switzerland) Ricardo Feller	Porsche 911 GT3 R (992.2)	2:19.601	2:20.304			PL
15	Pro	2	(Belgium) Boutsen VDS	(Netherlands) Morris Schuring	Porsche 911 GT3 R (992.2)	2:19.706				14
16	Pro	32	(Belgium) Team WRT	(South Africa) Jordan Pepper	BMW M4 GT3 Evo	2:19.743				15
17	Pro	22	(France) Schumacher CLRT	(Turkey) Ayhancan Güven	Porsche 911 GT3 R (992.2)	2:19.828				16
18	Pro	63	(Austria) TGI Team by GRT	(Italy) Mirko Bortolotti	Lamborghini Temerario GT3	2:19.830				17
19	Pro	98	(Germany) ROWE Racing	(Switzerland) Raffaele Marciello	BMW M4 GT3 Evo	2:19.841				18
20	Silver	44	(United Kingdom) Greystone GT	(United Kingdom) Josh Rattican	McLaren 720S GT3 Evo	2:19.850				19
21	Pro	46	(Belgium) Team WRT	(Germany) Max Hesse	BMW M4 GT3 Evo	2:19.921				20
22	Gold	4	(United Kingdom) Optimum Motorsport	(United Kingdom) Freddie Tomlinson	McLaren 720S GT3 Evo	2:20.017				21
23	Silver	20	(Austria) Team Motopark	(Switzerland) Yannick Mettler	Mercedes-AMG GT3 Evo	2:20.072				22
24	Gold	10	(Belgium) Boutsen VDS	(Belgium) Gilles Magnus	Porsche 911 GT3 R (992.2)	2:20.079				23
25	Gold	998	(Germany) ROWE Racing	(Belgium) Ugo de Wilde	BMW M4 GT3 Evo	2:20.119				24
26	Silver	25	(France) Saintéloc Racing	(Ukraine) Ivan Klymenko	Audi R8 LMS Evo II	2:20.138				25
27	Silver	52	(Italy) AF Corse	(Belgium) Jef Machiels	Ferrari 296 GT3 Evo	2:20.253				26
28	Pro	96	(Germany) Rutronik Racing	(Switzerland) Patric Niederhauser	Lamborghini Temerario GT3	2:20.436				27
–	Pro	50	(Italy) AF Corse	(Monaco) Arthur Leclerc	Ferrari 296 GT3 Evo	~~2:18.880~~	~~2:19.301~~	~~2:19.159~~	~~2:19.261~~	28 (Note: No. 50 AF Corse had all their Superpole times deleted due to running with disconnected data logger.)
–	Pro	7	(Belgium) Comtoyou Racing	(Italy) Mattia Drudi	Aston Martin Vantage AMR GT3 Evo	~~2:19.926~~				29 (Note: No. 7 Comtoyou Racing, No. 34 natural elements by Walkenhorst Motorsport, and No. 66 Tresor Attempto Racing had all their Superpole times deleted due to BoP non-compliance.)
–	Pro	34	(Germany) natural elements by Walkenhorst Motorsport	(Norway) Christian Krognes	Aston Martin Vantage AMR GT3 Evo	~~2:20.011~~				30
–	Silver	66	(Germany) Tresor Attempto Racing	(Israel) Ariel Levi	Audi R8 LMS Evo II	~~2:19.461~~	~~2:19.205~~	~~2:19.272~~		31

== Race ==
Class winners denoted in bold and with ‡

Pos	Class	No.	Team	Drivers	Car	Laps	Time/Retired
Pos	Class	No.	Team	Drivers	Engine	Laps	Time/Retired
**1**	P	**80**	**(Germany) Lionspeed GP**	**(Denmark) Bastian Buus** **(Switzerland) Ricardo Feller** **(Austria) Thomas Preining**	**Porsche 911 GT3 R (992.2)**	**541**	**24:00:51.689‡**
**1**	P	**80**	**(Germany) Lionspeed GP**	**(Denmark) Bastian Buus** **(Switzerland) Ricardo Feller** **(Austria) Thomas Preining**	**Porsche M97/80 4.2 L Flat-6**	**541**	**24:00:51.689‡**
2	P	48	(United States) Mercedes-AMG Team Mann-Filter	(Austria) Lucas Auer (Germany) Maro Engel (Germany) Luca Stolz	Mercedes-AMG GT3 Evo	541	+12.288
2	P	48	(United States) Mercedes-AMG Team Mann-Filter	(Austria) Lucas Auer (Germany) Maro Engel (Germany) Luca Stolz	Mercedes-Benz M159 6.2 L V8	541	+12.288
3	P	51	(Italy) AF Corse	(Italy) Tommaso Mosca (Denmark) Nicklas Nielsen (Italy) Alessio Rovera	Ferrari 296 GT3 Evo	541	+12.938
3	P	51	(Italy) AF Corse	(Italy) Tommaso Mosca (Denmark) Nicklas Nielsen (Italy) Alessio Rovera	Ferrari F163CE 3.0 L Turbo V6	541	+12.938
4	P	22	(France) Schumacher CLRT	(Australia) Matt Campbell (Turkey) Ayhancan Güven (France) Frédéric Makowiecki	Porsche 911 GT3 R (992.2)	541	+13.721
4	P	22	(France) Schumacher CLRT	(Australia) Matt Campbell (Turkey) Ayhancan Güven (France) Frédéric Makowiecki	Porsche M97/80 4.2 L Flat-6	541	+13.721
5	P	50	(Italy) AF Corse	(Indonesia) Sean Gelael (Monaco) Arthur Leclerc (France) Lilou Wadoux	Ferrari 296 GT3 Evo	541	+31.899
5	P	50	(Italy) AF Corse	(Indonesia) Sean Gelael (Monaco) Arthur Leclerc (France) Lilou Wadoux	Ferrari F163CE 3.0 L Turbo V6	541	+31.899
6	P	46	(Belgium) Team WRT	(United Kingdom) Dan Harper (Germany) Max Hesse (Italy) Valentino Rossi	BMW M4 GT3 Evo	541	+1:17.484
6	P	46	(Belgium) Team WRT	(United Kingdom) Dan Harper (Germany) Max Hesse (Italy) Valentino Rossi	BMW P58 3.0 L Turbo I6	541	+1:17.484
7	P	34	(Germany) natural elements by Walkenhorst Motorsport	(Portugal) Henrique Chaves (United Arab Emirates) Jamie Day (Norway) Christian Krognes	Aston Martin Vantage AMR GT3 Evo	541	+1:29.169
7	P	34	(Germany) natural elements by Walkenhorst Motorsport	(Portugal) Henrique Chaves (United Arab Emirates) Jamie Day (Norway) Christian Krognes	Aston Martin AMR16A 4.0 L Turbo V8	541	+1:29.169
8	P	2	(Belgium) Boutsen VDS	(France) Dorian Boccolacci (Belgium) Alessio Picariello (Netherlands) Morris Schuring	Porsche 911 GT3 R (992.2)	541	+2:01.813
8	P	2	(Belgium) Boutsen VDS	(France) Dorian Boccolacci (Belgium) Alessio Picariello (Netherlands) Morris Schuring	Porsche M97/80 4.2 L Flat-6	541	+2:01.813
9	P	98	(Germany) ROWE Racing	(United Kingdom) Jake Dennis (Brazil) Augusto Farfus (Switzerland) Raffaele Marciello	BMW M4 GT3 Evo	540	+1 Lap
9	P	98	(Germany) ROWE Racing	(United Kingdom) Jake Dennis (Brazil) Augusto Farfus (Switzerland) Raffaele Marciello	BMW P58 3.0 L Turbo I6	540	+1 Lap
**10**	B	**74**	**(Switzerland) Kessel Racing**	**(United States) Dustin Blattner** **(France) Mathys Jaubert** **(Germany) Dennis Marschall** **(United Kingdom) Ben Tuck**	Ferrari 296 GT3 Evo	**540**	**+1 Lap‡**
**10**	B	**74**	**(Switzerland) Kessel Racing**	**(United States) Dustin Blattner** **(France) Mathys Jaubert** **(Germany) Dennis Marschall** **(United Kingdom) Ben Tuck**	Ferrari F163CE 3.0 L Turbo V6	**540**	**+1 Lap‡**
**11**	G	**998**	**(Germany) ROWE Racing**	**(Belgium) Ugo de Wilde** **(Germany) Jens Klingmann** **(Germany) Tim Tramnitz**	BMW M4 GT3 Evo	**540**	**+1 Lap‡**
**11**	G	**998**	**(Germany) ROWE Racing**	**(Belgium) Ugo de Wilde** **(Germany) Jens Klingmann** **(Germany) Tim Tramnitz**	BMW P58 3.0 L Turbo I6	**540**	**+1 Lap‡**
12	P	32	(Belgium) Team WRT	(South Africa) Jordan Pepper (South Africa) Kelvin van der Linde (Belgium) Charles Weerts	BMW M4 GT3 Evo	539	+2 Laps
12	P	32	(Belgium) Team WRT	(South Africa) Jordan Pepper (South Africa) Kelvin van der Linde (Belgium) Charles Weerts	BMW P58 3.0 L Turbo I6	539	+2 Laps
13	B	991	(United Kingdom) Paradine Competition	(South Africa) Leyton Fourie (United Kingdom) James Kellet (United Kingdom) Darren Leung (United Kingdom) David Pittard	BMW M4 GT3 Evo	539	+2 Laps
13	B	991	(United Kingdom) Paradine Competition	(South Africa) Leyton Fourie (United Kingdom) James Kellet (United Kingdom) Darren Leung (United Kingdom) David Pittard	BMW P58 3.0 L Turbo I6	539	+2 Laps
**14**	S	**45**	**(Germany) Rinaldi Racing**	**(Italy) Alessandro Balzan** **(Spain) Rafael Durán** **(United States) Dylan Medler** **(South Africa) David Perel**	Ferrari 296 GT3 Evo	**539**	**+2 Laps‡**
**14**	S	**45**	**(Germany) Rinaldi Racing**	**(Italy) Alessandro Balzan** **(Spain) Rafael Durán** **(United States) Dylan Medler** **(South Africa) David Perel**	Ferrari F163CE 3.0 L Turbo V6	**539**	**+2 Laps‡**
15	S	30	(Belgium) Team WRT	(Belgium) Amaury Cordeel (Belgium) Mathieu Detry (Belgium) Matisse Lismont (Argentina) Ignacio Montenegro	BMW M4 GT3 Evo	539	+2 Laps
15	S	30	(Belgium) Team WRT	(Belgium) Amaury Cordeel (Belgium) Mathieu Detry (Belgium) Matisse Lismont (Argentina) Ignacio Montenegro	BMW P58 3.0 L Turbo I6	539	+2 Laps
16	S	52	(Italy) AF Corse	(Italy) Francesco Braschi (Belgium) Jef Machiels (Belgium) Gilles Stadsbader (Peru) Matías Zagazeta	Ferrari 296 GT3 Evo	538	+3 Laps
16	S	52	(Italy) AF Corse	(Italy) Francesco Braschi (Belgium) Jef Machiels (Belgium) Gilles Stadsbader (Peru) Matías Zagazeta	Ferrari F163CE 3.0 L Turbo V6	538	+3 Laps
17	S	5	(United Kingdom) Optimum Motorsport	(Portugal) Guilherme Oliveira (Germany) Salman Owega (United Kingdom) Mikey Porter (Netherlands) Dante Rappange	McLaren 720S GT3 Evo	538	+3 Laps
17	S	5	(United Kingdom) Optimum Motorsport	(Portugal) Guilherme Oliveira (Germany) Salman Owega (United Kingdom) Mikey Porter (Netherlands) Dante Rappange	McLaren M840T 4.0 L Turbo V8	538	+3 Laps
18	S	65	(Germany) HRT Ford Racing	(Philippines) Eduardo Coseteng (Germany) Max Reis (Netherlands) Maxime Oosten (Germany) Finn Wiebelhaus	Ford Mustang GT3 Evo	537	+4 Laps
18	S	65	(Germany) HRT Ford Racing	(Philippines) Eduardo Coseteng (Germany) Max Reis (Netherlands) Maxime Oosten (Germany) Finn Wiebelhaus	Ford Coyote 5.4 L V8	537	+4 Laps
19	P	96	(Germany) Rutronik Racing	(Germany) Luca Engstler (Italy) Marco Mapelli (Switzerland) Patric Niederhauser	Lamborghini Temerario GT3	537	+4 Laps
19	P	96	(Germany) Rutronik Racing	(Germany) Luca Engstler (Italy) Marco Mapelli (Switzerland) Patric Niederhauser	Lamborghini L411 4.0 L Turbo V8	537	+4 Laps
20	B	89	(Germany) Lionspeed GP	(Switzerland) Alex Fontana (Zimbabwe) Axcil Jefferies (Germany) Patrick Kolb (Canada) Bashar Mardini	Porsche 911 GT3 R (992.2)	537	+4 Laps
20	B	89	(Germany) Lionspeed GP	(Switzerland) Alex Fontana (Zimbabwe) Axcil Jefferies (Germany) Patrick Kolb (Canada) Bashar Mardini	Porsche M97/80 4.2 L Flat-6	537	+4 Laps
21	B	87	(United States) Winward Racing	(Germany) Marvin Dienst (Italy) Gabriele Piana (Netherlands) "Daan Arrow"; Rinat Salikhov	Mercedes-AMG GT3 Evo	536	+5 Laps
21	B	87	(United States) Winward Racing	(Germany) Marvin Dienst (Italy) Gabriele Piana (Netherlands) "Daan Arrow"; Rinat Salikhov	Mercedes-Benz M159 6.2 L V8	536	+5 Laps
22	G	10	(Belgium) Boutsen VDS	(France) Alessandro Ghiretti (Sweden) Robin Knutsson (Belgium) Gilles Magnus	Porsche 911 GT3 R (992.2)	534	+7 Laps
22	G	10	(Belgium) Boutsen VDS	(France) Alessandro Ghiretti (Sweden) Robin Knutsson (Belgium) Gilles Magnus	Porsche M97/80 4.2 L Flat-6	534	+7 Laps
23	S	20	(Austria) Team Motopark	(Angola) Rui Andrade (Australia) Christian Mansell (Switzerland) Yannick Mettler (Hungary) Levente Révész	Mercedes-AMG GT3 Evo	534	+7 Laps
23	S	20	(Austria) Team Motopark	(Angola) Rui Andrade (Australia) Christian Mansell (Switzerland) Yannick Mettler (Hungary) Levente Révész	Mercedes-Benz M159 6.2 L V8	534	+7 Laps
24	G	4	(United Kingdom) Optimum Motorsport	(United Kingdom) Harry George (Netherlands) Ruben del Sarte (United Kingdom) Adam Smalley (United Kingdom) Freddie Tomlinson	McLaren 720S GT3 Evo	534	+7 Laps
24	G	4	(United Kingdom) Optimum Motorsport	(United Kingdom) Harry George (Netherlands) Ruben del Sarte (United Kingdom) Adam Smalley (United Kingdom) Freddie Tomlinson	McLaren M840T 4.0 L Turbo V8	534	+7 Laps
25	S	54	(Italy) Dinamic GT	(France) Loris Cabirou (Thailand) Tanart Sathienthirakul (Italy) Francesco Simonazzi (United Kingdom) Angus Whiteside	Porsche 911 GT3 R (992.2)	532	+9 Laps
25	S	54	(Italy) Dinamic GT	(France) Loris Cabirou (Thailand) Tanart Sathienthirakul (Italy) Francesco Simonazzi (United Kingdom) Angus Whiteside	Porsche M97/80 4.2 L Flat-6	532	+9 Laps
26	G	71	(Denmark) Selected Car Racing	(Denmark) Simon Birch (Denmark) Malte Ebdrup (Denmark) Conrad Laursen (Denmark) Frederik Schandorff	Ferrari 296 GT3 Evo	532	+9 Laps
26	G	71	(Denmark) Selected Car Racing	(Denmark) Simon Birch (Denmark) Malte Ebdrup (Denmark) Conrad Laursen (Denmark) Frederik Schandorff	Ferrari F163CE 3.0 L Turbo V6	532	+9 Laps
27	B	222	(Bahrain) 2 Seas Motorsport	(Republic of Ireland) Reece Barr (United Kingdom) Charles Dawson (United Kingdom) Kiern Jewiss (Australia) Garnet Patterson	Mercedes-AMG GT3 Evo	532	+9 Laps
27	B	222	(Bahrain) 2 Seas Motorsport	(Republic of Ireland) Reece Barr (United Kingdom) Charles Dawson (United Kingdom) Kiern Jewiss (Australia) Garnet Patterson	Mercedes-Benz M159 6.2 L V8	532	+9 Laps
28	S	6	(United States) GetSpeed Team Bartone Bros	(United States) Anthony Bartone (Poland) Karol Basz (France) César Gazeau (France) Aurélien Panis	Mercedes-AMG GT3 Evo	532	+9 Laps
28	S	6	(United States) GetSpeed Team Bartone Bros	(United States) Anthony Bartone (Poland) Karol Basz (France) César Gazeau (France) Aurélien Panis	Mercedes-Benz M159 6.2 L V8	532	+9 Laps
**29**	PA	**0**	**(Malaysia) Johor Motorsports Racing JMR**	**(United Kingdom) Ben Green** **(Australia) Jordan Love** **(Malaysia) Prince Abu Bakar Ibrahim** **(Malaysia) Prince Jefri Ibrahim**	Chevrolet Corvette Z06 GT3.R	**531**	**+10 Laps**
**29**	PA	**0**	**(Malaysia) Johor Motorsports Racing JMR**	**(United Kingdom) Ben Green** **(Australia) Jordan Love** **(Malaysia) Prince Abu Bakar Ibrahim** **(Malaysia) Prince Jefri Ibrahim**	Chevrolet LT6.R 5.5 L V8	**531**	**+10 Laps**
30	S	25	(France) Saintéloc Racing	(France) Étienne Cheli (Ukraine) Ivan Klymenko (France) Lucas Légeret (Argentina) Ezequiel Pérez Companc	Audi R8 LMS Evo II	531	+10 Laps
30	S	25	(France) Saintéloc Racing	(France) Étienne Cheli (Ukraine) Ivan Klymenko (France) Lucas Légeret (Argentina) Ezequiel Pérez Companc	Audi DAR 5.2 L V10	531	+10 Laps
31	B	56	(United Kingdom) Ecurie Ecosse Blackthorn	(United Kingdom) Jonny Adam (United Kingdom) Lorcan Hanafin (France) Romain Leroux (Italy) Giacomo Petrobelli	Aston Martin Vantage AMR GT3 Evo	529	+12 Laps
31	B	56	(United Kingdom) Ecurie Ecosse Blackthorn	(United Kingdom) Jonny Adam (United Kingdom) Lorcan Hanafin (France) Romain Leroux (Italy) Giacomo Petrobelli	Aston Martin AMR16A 4.0 L Turbo V8	529	+12 Laps
32	PA	86	(Denmark) High Class Racing	(Denmark) Anders Fjordbach (China) Kerong Li (China) Leo Ye Hongli (China) Yuan Bo	Porsche 911 GT3 R (992.2)	528	+13 Laps
32	PA	86	(Denmark) High Class Racing	(Denmark) Anders Fjordbach (China) Kerong Li (China) Leo Ye Hongli (China) Yuan Bo	Porsche M97/80 4.2 L Flat-6	528	+13 Laps
33	PA	999	(Germany) GetSpeed Team PCX	(France) Jordan Boisson (France) Patrick Charlaix (France) Marvin Klein (Belgium) Benjamin Paque	Mercedes-AMG GT3 Evo	527	+14 Laps
33	PA	999	(Germany) GetSpeed Team PCX	(France) Jordan Boisson (France) Patrick Charlaix (France) Marvin Klein (Belgium) Benjamin Paque	Mercedes-Benz M159 6.2 L V8	527	+14 Laps
34	G	111	(France) CSA Racing	(France) Simon Gachet (United Kingdom) James Kell (France) Jim Pla (France) Arthur Rougier	McLaren 720S GT3 Evo	519	+22 Laps
34	G	111	(France) CSA Racing	(France) Simon Gachet (United Kingdom) James Kell (France) Jim Pla (France) Arthur Rougier	McLaren M840T 4.0 L Turbo V8	519	+22 Laps
35	S	23	(United Kingdom) Team RJN	(United States) Wyatt Brichacek (Germany) Ben Dörr (United Kingdom) Horatio Fitz-Simon (United Kingdom) Max Lynn	McLaren 720S GT3 Evo	516	+25 Laps
35	S	23	(United Kingdom) Team RJN	(United States) Wyatt Brichacek (Germany) Ben Dörr (United Kingdom) Horatio Fitz-Simon (United Kingdom) Max Lynn	McLaren M840T 4.0 L Turbo V8	516	+25 Laps
36	G	58	(United Kingdom) Garage 59	(United Kingdom) Tom Fleming (Germany) Benjamin Goethe (Monaco) Louis Prette	McLaren 720S GT3 Evo	513	+28 Laps
36	G	58	(United Kingdom) Garage 59	(United Kingdom) Tom Fleming (Germany) Benjamin Goethe (Monaco) Louis Prette	McLaren M840T 4.0 L Turbo V8	513	+28 Laps
37	S	44	(United Kingdom) Greystone GT	(Australia) Jayden Kelly (United Kingdom) Zac Meakin (Spain) Tommy Pintos (United Kingdom) Josh Rattican	McLaren 720S GT3 Evo	508	+33 Laps
37	S	44	(United Kingdom) Greystone GT	(Australia) Jayden Kelly (United Kingdom) Zac Meakin (Spain) Tommy Pintos (United Kingdom) Josh Rattican	McLaren M840T 4.0 L Turbo V8	508	+33 Laps
38	PA	79	(San Marino) Tsunami RT	(Italy) Fabio Babini (Japan) Hiroshi Hamaguchi (Germany) Nico Menzel (Italy) Johannes Zelger	Porsche 911 GT3 R (992.2)	507	+34 Laps
38	PA	79	(San Marino) Tsunami RT	(Italy) Fabio Babini (Japan) Hiroshi Hamaguchi (Germany) Nico Menzel (Italy) Johannes Zelger	Porsche M97/80 4.2 L Flat-6	507	+34 Laps
39	PA	8	(Germany) Car Collection Motorsport	(Canada) Reinhold Krahn (Switzerland) Nicolò Rosi (Italy) Niccolò Schirò (Germany) Joel Sturm	Porsche 911 GT3 R (992.2)	497	+44 Laps
39	PA	8	(Germany) Car Collection Motorsport	(Canada) Reinhold Krahn (Switzerland) Nicolò Rosi (Italy) Niccolò Schirò (Germany) Joel Sturm	Porsche M97/80 4.2 L Flat-6	497	+44 Laps
40	S	555	(France) CSA Racing	(France) Romain Andriolo (Belgium) Lorens Lecertua (Belgium) Baptiste Moulin (India) Sai Sanjay	McLaren 720S GT3 Evo	488	+53 Laps
40	S	555	(France) CSA Racing	(France) Romain Andriolo (Belgium) Lorens Lecertua (Belgium) Baptiste Moulin (India) Sai Sanjay	McLaren M840T 4.0 L Turbo V8	488	+53 Laps
41	G	24	(United Kingdom) Steller Motorsport	(France) Antoine Doquin (Denmark) Dennis Lind (Denmark) Mikkel Gaarde Pedersen (Germany) Lenny Ried	Chevrolet Corvette Z06 GT3.R	485	+56 Laps
41	G	24	(United Kingdom) Steller Motorsport	(France) Antoine Doquin (Denmark) Dennis Lind (Denmark) Mikkel Gaarde Pedersen (Germany) Lenny Ried	Chevrolet LT6.R 5.5 L V8	485	+56 Laps
42	PA	914	(Austria) Razoon - more than racing	(United Kingdom) Kenzie Beecroft (Thailand) Carl Bennett (Australia) Bryce Fullwood (United Kingdom) Edward McDermott	Porsche 911 GT3 R (992.2)	460	+81 Laps
42	PA	914	(Austria) Razoon - more than racing	(United Kingdom) Kenzie Beecroft (Thailand) Carl Bennett (Australia) Bryce Fullwood (United Kingdom) Edward McDermott	Porsche M97/80 4.2 L Flat-6	460	+81 Laps
43	B	97	(Germany) Rutronik Racing	(Hong Kong) Antares Au (Denmark) Michelle Gatting (Germany) Sven Müller (Estonia) Martin Rump	Porsche 911 GT3 R (992.2)	457	+84 Laps
43	B	97	(Germany) Rutronik Racing	(Hong Kong) Antares Au (Denmark) Michelle Gatting (Germany) Sven Müller (Estonia) Martin Rump	Porsche M97/80 4.2 L Flat-6	457	+84 Laps
44	B	33	(Bahrain) 2 Seas Motorsport	(United States) Jason Hart (United States) Scott Noble (United Kingdom) Aaron Walker (United Kingdom) Lewis Williamson	Mercedes-AMG GT3 Evo	453	+88 Laps
44	B	33	(Bahrain) 2 Seas Motorsport	(United States) Jason Hart (United States) Scott Noble (United Kingdom) Aaron Walker (United Kingdom) Lewis Williamson	Mercedes-Benz M159 6.2 L V8	453	+88 Laps
45	B	123	(Belgium) Mühlner Motorsport	(Belgium) Armand Fumal (Australia) Bayley Hall (Australia) Andres Latorre Canon (Germany) Tobias Müller	Porsche 911 GT3 R (992.2)	427	+114 Laps
45	B	123	(Belgium) Mühlner Motorsport	(Belgium) Armand Fumal (Australia) Bayley Hall (Australia) Andres Latorre Canon (Germany) Tobias Müller	Porsche M97/80 4.2 L Flat-6	427	+114 Laps
46	B	91	(Germany) Herberth Motorsport	(Germany) Ralf Bohn (Netherlands) Huub van Ejindhoven (France) Mathieu Jaminet (Germany) Robert Renauer	Porsche 911 GT3 R (992.2)	384	+157 Laps
46	B	91	(Germany) Herberth Motorsport	(Germany) Ralf Bohn (Netherlands) Huub van Ejindhoven (France) Mathieu Jaminet (Germany) Robert Renauer	Porsche M97/80 4.2 L Flat-6	384	+157 Laps
47	B	12	(United Arab Emirates) GetSpeed Team Dubai	(Canada) Mikaël Grenier (Germany) Tom Kalender (Luxembourg) Gabriel Rindone (South Africa) Jarrod Waberski	Mercedes-AMG GT3 Evo	379	+162 Laps
47	B	12	(United Arab Emirates) GetSpeed Team Dubai	(Canada) Mikaël Grenier (Germany) Tom Kalender (Luxembourg) Gabriel Rindone (South Africa) Jarrod Waberski	Mercedes-Benz M159 6.2 L V8	379	+162 Laps
DNF	P	3	(Netherlands) Mercedes-AMG Team Verstappen Racing	(Andorra) Jules Gounon (Spain) Daniel Juncadella (United Kingdom) Chris Lulham	Mercedes-AMG GT3 Evo	373	Overheating
DNF	P	3	(Netherlands) Mercedes-AMG Team Verstappen Racing	(Andorra) Jules Gounon (Spain) Daniel Juncadella (United Kingdom) Chris Lulham	Mercedes-Benz M159 6.2 L V8	373	Overheating
DNF	P	64	(Germany) HRT Ford Racing	(France) Thomas Drouet (India) Arjun Maini (Switzerland) Fabio Scherer	Ford Mustang GT3 Evo	348	Gearbox
DNF	P	64	(Germany) HRT Ford Racing	(France) Thomas Drouet (India) Arjun Maini (Switzerland) Fabio Scherer	Ford Coyote 5.4 L V8	348	Gearbox
DNF	P	7	(Belgium) Comtoyou Racing	(Italy) Mattia Drudi (Denmark) Marco Sørensen (Denmark) Nicki Thiim	Aston Martin Vantage AMR GT3 Evo	320	Suspension
DNF	P	7	(Belgium) Comtoyou Racing	(Italy) Mattia Drudi (Denmark) Marco Sørensen (Denmark) Nicki Thiim	Aston Martin AMR16A 4.0 L Turbo V8	320	Suspension
DNF	PA	700	(Belgium) Comtoyou Racing	(Belgium) Nicolas Baert (Belgium) Sarah Bovy (Belgium) Xavier Knauf (Belgium) Grégory Servais	Aston Martin Vantage AMR GT3 Evo	243	Accident
DNF	PA	700	(Belgium) Comtoyou Racing	(Belgium) Nicolas Baert (Belgium) Sarah Bovy (Belgium) Xavier Knauf (Belgium) Grégory Servais	Aston Martin AMR16A 4.0 L Turbo V8	243	Accident
DNF	B	11	(Belgium) Comtoyou Racing	(Italy) Felice Jelmini (Canada) Kyle Marcelli (United States) AJ Muss (Brazil) Marcelo Tomasoni	Aston Martin Vantage AMR GT3 Evo	243	Mechanical
DNF	B	11	(Belgium) Comtoyou Racing	(Italy) Felice Jelmini (Canada) Kyle Marcelli (United States) AJ Muss (Brazil) Marcelo Tomasoni	Aston Martin AMR16A 4.0 L Turbo V8	243	Mechanical
DNF	B	42	Oman Racing by Century Motorsport	(Oman) Ahmad Al Harthy (Brazil) Pedro Ebrahim (Spain) Javier Sagrera (Australia) Calan Williams	BMW M4 GT3 Evo	238	Mechanical
DNF	B	42	Oman Racing by Century Motorsport	(Oman) Ahmad Al Harthy (Brazil) Pedro Ebrahim (Spain) Javier Sagrera (Australia) Calan Williams	BMW P58 3.0 L Turbo I6	238	Mechanical
DNF	P	84	(Austria) Eastalent Racing	(Germany) Christopher Haase (Austria) Simon Reicher (Germany) Markus Winkelhock	Audi R8 LMS Evo II	233	Accident
DNF	P	84	(Austria) Eastalent Racing	(Germany) Christopher Haase (Austria) Simon Reicher (Germany) Markus Winkelhock	Audi DAR 5.2 L V10	233	Accident
DNF	B	60	(United Kingdom) JMW Motorsport	(Germany) Tim Heinemann (Switzerland) Rolf Ineichen (Germany) Thomas Kiefer (France) Pierre-Louis Chovet	Ferrari 296 GT3 Evo	196	Fire
DNF	B	60	(United Kingdom) JMW Motorsport	(Germany) Tim Heinemann (Switzerland) Rolf Ineichen (Germany) Thomas Kiefer (France) Pierre-Louis Chovet	Ferrari F163CE 3.0 L Turbo V6	196	Fire
DNF	B	88	(Germany) Tresor Attempto Racing	(Italy) Daniele Di Amato (Greece) Georgios Kolovos (Germany) Carrie Schreiner (Brazil) Sérgio Sette Câmara	Audi R8 LMS Evo II	179	Engine
DNF	B	88	(Germany) Tresor Attempto Racing	(Italy) Daniele Di Amato (Greece) Georgios Kolovos (Germany) Carrie Schreiner (Brazil) Sérgio Sette Câmara	Audi DAR 5.2 L V10	179	Engine
DNF	B	93	(United Kingdom) Ziggo Sport – Tempesta Racing	(Italy) Eddie Cheever III (United Kingdom) Chris Froggatt (Hong Kong) Jonathan Hui (Netherlands) Mex Jansen	Porsche 911 GT3 R (992.2)	163	Collision damage
DNF	B	93	(United Kingdom) Ziggo Sport – Tempesta Racing	(Italy) Eddie Cheever III (United Kingdom) Chris Froggatt (Hong Kong) Jonathan Hui (Netherlands) Mex Jansen	Porsche M97/80 4.2 L Flat-6	163	Collision damage
DNF	S	9	(Lithuania) Pure Rxcing	(Austria) Max Hofer (United Kingdom) Alex Malykhin (Slovenia) Alexey Nesov (Italy) Enzo Trulli	Porsche 911 GT3 R (992.2)	159	Collision
DNF	S	9	(Lithuania) Pure Rxcing	(Austria) Max Hofer (United Kingdom) Alex Malykhin (Slovenia) Alexey Nesov (Italy) Enzo Trulli	Porsche M97/80 4.2 L Flat-6	159	Collision
DNF	S	21	(Belgium) Comtoyou Racing	(France) Sébastien Baud (France) Arthur Dorison (Belgium) Kobe Pauwels (Sweden) Oliver Söderström	Aston Martin Vantage AMR GT3 Evo	150	Accident
DNF	S	21	(Belgium) Comtoyou Racing	(France) Sébastien Baud (France) Arthur Dorison (Belgium) Kobe Pauwels (Sweden) Oliver Söderström	Aston Martin AMR16A 4.0 L Turbo V8	150	Accident
DNF	P	63	(Austria) TGI Team by GRT	(Italy) Mirko Bortolotti (Germany) Maximilian Paul (France) Franck Perera	Lamborghini Temerario GT3	144	Engine
DNF	P	63	(Austria) TGI Team by GRT	(Italy) Mirko Bortolotti (Germany) Maximilian Paul (France) Franck Perera	Lamborghini L411 4.0 L Turbo V8	144	Engine
DNF	P	59	(United Kingdom) Garage 59	(Germany) Marvin Kirchhöfer (United Kingdom) Joseph Loake (United Kingdom) Dean MacDonald	McLaren 720S GT3 Evo	140	Brakes
DNF	P	59	(United Kingdom) Garage 59	(Germany) Marvin Kirchhöfer (United Kingdom) Joseph Loake (United Kingdom) Dean MacDonald	McLaren M840T 4.0 L Turbo V8	140	Brakes
DNF	P	17	(Germany) Mercedes-AMG Team GetSpeed	(Germany) Maximilian Götz (Belgium) Maxime Martin (Germany) Fabian Schiller	Mercedes-AMG GT3 Evo	70	Collision damage
DNF	P	17	(Germany) Mercedes-AMG Team GetSpeed	(Germany) Maximilian Götz (Belgium) Maxime Martin (Germany) Fabian Schiller	Mercedes-Benz M159 6.2 L V8	70	Collision damage
DNF	PA	177	(Belgium) Grupo Prom Racing Team	(Netherlands) Colin Caresani (United Kingdom) Adam Christodoulou (Mexico) Alfredo Hernández (France) Stéphane Tribaudini	Mercedes-AMG GT3 Evo	69	Beached
DNF	PA	177	(Belgium) Grupo Prom Racing Team	(Netherlands) Colin Caresani (United Kingdom) Adam Christodoulou (Mexico) Alfredo Hernández (France) Stéphane Tribaudini	Mercedes-Benz M159 6.2 L V8	69	Beached
DNF	PA	28	(Antigua and Barbuda) HAAS RT	(Belgium) Simon Balcaen (Belgium) Mathieu Castelein (Belgium) Pierre Castelein (France) Steven Palette	Audi R8 LMS Evo II	69	Suspension
DNF	PA	28	(Antigua and Barbuda) HAAS RT	(Belgium) Simon Balcaen (Belgium) Mathieu Castelein (Belgium) Pierre Castelein (France) Steven Palette	Audi DAR 5.2 L V10	69	Suspension
DNF	G	99	(Germany) Tresor Attempto Racing	(Germany) Alex Aka (Italy) Andrea Frassineti (Luxembourg) Dylan Pereira	Audi R8 LMS Evo II	22	Wheel
DNF	G	99	(Germany) Tresor Attempto Racing	(Germany) Alex Aka (Italy) Andrea Frassineti (Luxembourg) Dylan Pereira	Audi DAR 5.2 L V10	22	Wheel
DNF	PA	70	(Italy) AF Corse	(Republic of Ireland) Peter Dempsey (Spain) Miguel Molina (Brazil) Custodio Toledo (France) Matthieu Vaxivière	Ferrari 296 GT3 Evo	3	Collision damage
DNF	PA	70	(Italy) AF Corse	(Republic of Ireland) Peter Dempsey (Spain) Miguel Molina (Brazil) Custodio Toledo (France) Matthieu Vaxivière	Ferrari F163CE 3.0 L Turbo V6	3	Collision damage
DNF	S	66	(Germany) Tresor Attempto Racing	(Slovenia) Mark Kastelic (Israel) Ariel Levi (Italy) Rocco Mazzola (Denmark) Sebastian Øgaard	Audi R8 LMS Evo II	1	Collision
DNF	S	66	(Germany) Tresor Attempto Racing	(Slovenia) Mark Kastelic (Israel) Ariel Levi (Italy) Rocco Mazzola (Denmark) Sebastian Øgaard	Audi DAR 5.2 L V10	1	Collision
DNF	S	35	(Germany) Walkenhorst Motorsport	(Switzerland) Ethan Ischer (France) Maxime Robin (France) Gaspard Simon (Ecuador) Mateo Villagómez	Aston Martin Vantage AMR GT3 Evo	1	Collision
DNF	S	35	(Germany) Walkenhorst Motorsport	(Switzerland) Ethan Ischer (France) Maxime Robin (France) Gaspard Simon (Ecuador) Mateo Villagómez	Aston Martin AMR16A 4.0 L Turbo V8	1	Collision
DNF	S	992	(United Kingdom) Paradine Competition	(Mexico) Ian Aguilera (Brazil) Christian Hahn (Netherlands) Jop Rappange (United Kingdom) Josh Rowledge	BMW M4 GT3 Evo	1	Collision
DNF	S	992	(United Kingdom) Paradine Competition	(Mexico) Ian Aguilera (Brazil) Christian Hahn (Netherlands) Jop Rappange (United Kingdom) Josh Rowledge	BMW P58 3.0 L Turbo I6	1	Collision

Icon	Class
**P**	Pro Cup
**G**	Gold Cup
**S**	Silver Cup
**PA**	Pro-Am Cup
**B**	Bronze Cup

== Notes ==
Intercontinental GT Challenge
Previous race: 2026 24 Hours of Nürburgring	2026 season	Next race: 2026 Suzuka 1000 km

GT World Challenge Europe Endurance Cup
Previous race: 2026 3 Hours of Monza	2026 season	Next race: 2025 3 Hours of Nürburgring
