= Dennis Lind =

Danish racing driver

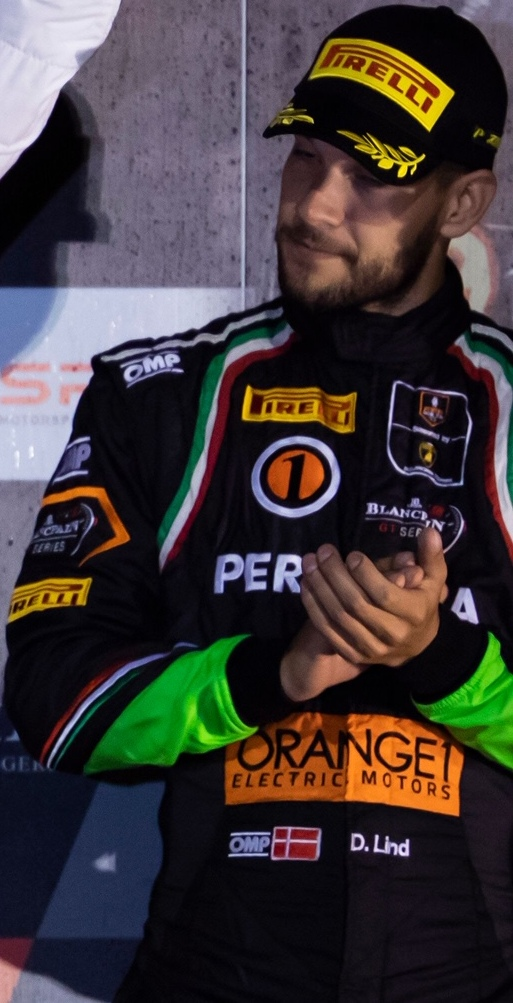
- Lind in 2019
- Nationality: (Denmark) Danish
- Born: Dennis Marcel Galindo Lind; February 3, 1993 (age 33) Roskilde, Denmark
- Relatives: Jan Magnussen (uncle); Kevin Magnussen (cousin)

British GT Championship career
- Debut season: 2020-present
- Current team: Barwell Motorsport
- Categorisation: FIA Silver (until 2018); FIA Gold (2019–2022, 2026–); FIA Platinum (2023–2025)
- Car number: 63

Dennis Marcel Galindo Lind (born 3 February 1993 in Roskilde) is a Danish racing driver of Colombian descent who is currently participating in GT World Challenge Europe Endurance Cup and the Lamborghini Super Trofeo North America. He is the nephew and cousin of Formula One drivers Jan and Kevin Magnussen, respectively. He is both European and World Champion of Lamborghini Super Trofeo.

== Career ==
Lind started his racing career by karting, driving in Italy but mainly in Scandinavia, throughout 2006 and 2007. In 2008, he competed in various Formula Ford events; he won the single-round North European Championship, he finished second behind his cousin Kevin Magnussen in the Danish Championship and entered the Benelux Formula Ford Championship. This got him invited to two 2008 British Formula Ford races at Circuit de Spa-Francorchamps. He finished 15th and 21st.

Lind's 2009 season looked much alike the year before; he was first in the Danish, seventh in the North European and sixteenth in the Benelux Championship. This got him invited to the annual Formula Ford Festival. He finished fourteenth. In 2010, Lind entered the full season of British Formula Ford and finished fifteenth. He won the Formula Ford Festival.

In 2011, Lind entered only half the races of the 2011 ADAC Formel Masters season, but still finished tenth. He also finished sixth and eighth in the last weekend of the German F3 during the same year. He then competed in the Auto-G Danish Thundersport Championship (which is essentially Danish Touring Cars), coming second just behind his uncle Jan Magnussen in 2012 and then became DTC Champion of 2013. 2014 saw Lind's return to formula racing where he took part in the Formula Acceleration 1. He also drove for AF Corse during the first weekend of the ELMS at Silverstone.

In 2015, Lind competed in the Danish Thundersport Championship finishing second in the standings after mechanical issues spoiled his season finale. In 2016, Lind attempted to drive in both DTC and Lamborghini Super Trofeo, but after a few rounds, it became nonviable and his sole focus was on the Super Trofeo season due to its international reputation and appeal. During the season, Lind became part of the Lamborghini Squadra Corse Young Driver Program, and on December 4, 2016, became double champion of Super Trofeo in both European and World championships at the final round in Valencia.

In 2017, Lind contested occasional races in Lamborghini Super Trofeo as well as a 3 race-long debut in the Blancpain GT Europe Endurance series.

2018 saw Lind take part in the Blancpain GT Asia series, with Martin Kodrić sharing driving duties. They finished as champions.

hn 2019, Lind played a major part in FFF Orange1 Racing Team's and Lamborghini's successful factory effort at securing the Blancpain GT Europe Endurance championship. However, due to serious illness, Lind had to sit out the final round of the season and therefore couldn't be scored as a champion.

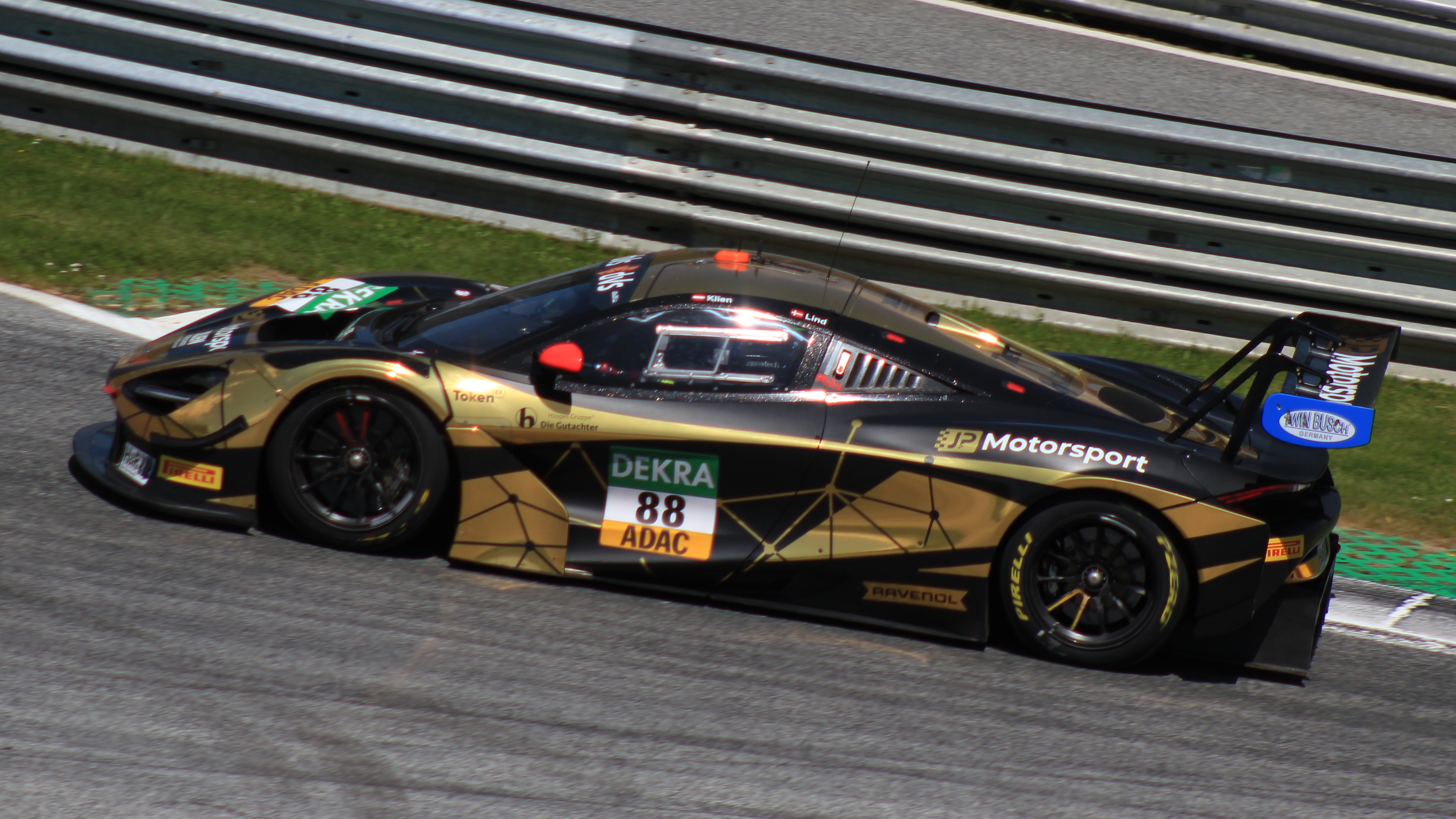
Lind racing in the ADAC GT Masters in 2022

In 2022, Lind continued racing GT3 machineries, signing a contract with JP Motorsport and driving in GT World Challenge Europe Endurance Cup.

== Lamborghini Super Trofeo ==
In 2016, Lind had the opportunity to drive for Italian team Raton Racing in the 2016 Lamborghini Super Trofeo season. Pre-Season testing went very well, and his drive for the entire championship as a solo driver in the PRO category was confirmed. The season started very well with Lind taking the win at the first round in Monza but was hampered by a brake issue in the second race which removed all chance of a good result. The second round at Silverstone looked to be an improvement on the first round at Monza, with Lind taking the first race convincingly controlling his lead from start to finish but in race two lapped traffic caused an incident and caused Linf to spin losing the lead and subsequent positions to finish eighth in class.

The third round at Paul Ricard was arguably Lind's best performance during the European championship. He endured a strong challenge in both races from closest rival Vito Postiglione but went on to win both races despite the pressure. Round 4 at Spa proved to be relatively difficult with Lind only managing to find a seventh and second place. Round 5 was even worse with tenth place in the first race and only third in the second race. Lind's championship hopes hung in the balance amidst the consistent challenge of Postiglione and late bloomer in the championship, the Latvian driver Haralds Schlegelmilch.

The final round at Valencia which was also host to the World Finals had four races installed. Two for the European, Asian and North American championships respectively and the latter two races for the main event, the world final. The first race of the weekend Dennis won with a fairly small margin to Postiglione. The second race was less convincing from Lind, but nevertheless sealed the European Championship with a fifth position.

The first race of the world finals didn't go in his favour and he was set to finish third but with a few laps remaining Loris Spinelli had a spectacular engine failure thus promoting Lind to second place and Postiglione to 1st. The battle was on for the final round of the season in race two of the world finals when the rain came down, and it came down hard. Lind started fourth but made his way to second within the first few running laps after the race started under safety car. During the first few laps under green flag conditions, Postiglione lost touch from the lead pair of Lind and Spinelli and then subsequently dropped further back to sixth place and then had a spin, Lind knew that the second place he currently would be good enough to take the world title but it would not prove so easy. The race went on and the rain got even harder, with standing water all around the track. During the majority of the race Vito Postiglione had a storming drive after his mistake and fought his way back to second behind Haralds Schlegelmilch.

Due to the amount of standing water at Turn 9, both Schlegelmilch and Postiglione were caught out. However, it was Vito Postiglione that capitalized on it and got himself back into third place and therefore was in the driving seat for the world title. The Raton Racing team notified Lind of the championship situation via pit-to-car radio and as such, Dennis realized he had to attack for first place in these treacherous conditions to take his destiny into his own hands. In what would be the final few moments of the race, Lind skillfully passed Spinelli for the race lead and the win, thereby sealing a fantastic season off with both World and European Lamborghini Super Trofeo championships.

== Racing record ==
=== Career summary ===
| Season | Series | Team | Races | Wins | Poles | F/Laps | Podiums | Points | Position |
|---|---|---|---|---|---|---|---|---|---|
| 2008 | Formula Ford NEZ | Fluid Motorsport | 2 | 1 | 1 | 1 | 2 | 43 | **1st** |
| 2009 | Formula Ford Denmark | Fluid Motorsport | 16 | 10 | 3 | 10 | 14 | 284 | **1st** |
| 2010 | British Formula Ford Championship | Fluid Motorsport | 6 | 1 | 0 | 1 | 1 | 129 | 15th |
| 2010 | Formula Ford Festival | Fluid Motorsport | 4 | 4 | 0 | 0 | 4 | N/A | **1st** |
| 2011 | ADAC Formel Masters | ma-con Motorsport | 12 | 0 | 0 | 0 | 2 | 83 | 10th |
| 2011 | Peugeot Spider Cup Denmark | | 4 | 2 | 0 | 2 | 2 | 66 | 8th |
| 2012 | Danish Thundersport Championship | Memphis Racing | 12 | 2 | 8 | 0 | 1 | 162 | **2nd** |
| 2013 | Danish Thundersport Championship | Danish Motorsport Development | 14 | 6 | 5 | 7 | 9 | 210 | **1st** |
| 2014 | European Le Mans Series - GTC | AF Corse | 1 | 0 | 0 | 0 | 0 | 1 | 28th |
| 2014 | Formula Acceleration 1 | Acceleration Team Sweden | 2 | 0 | 0 | 0 | 0 | 24 | 11th |
| 2014 | Formula Acceleration 1 | Acceleration Team Venezuela | 4 | 0 | 0 | 0 | 0 | 24 | 11th |
| 2015 | Danish Thundersport Championship | Massive Motorsport | 24 | 7 | 1 | 5 | 14 | 367 | **2nd** |
| 2016 | Lamborghini Super Trofeo Europe | Raton Racing | 12 | 6 | 5 | 5 | 7 | 123 | **1st** |
| 2016 | Lamborghini Super Trofeo World Finals | Raton Racing | 2 | 1 | 0 | 1 | 2 | 27 | **1st** |
| 2017 | Blancpain GT Series Endurance Cup | Raton Racing | 3 | 0 | 0 | 0 | 0 | 0 | NC |
| 2017 | Lamborghini Super Trofeo Asia - Pro | Emperor Racing | 2 | 0 | 0 | 0 | 1 | 12 | 14th |
| 2018 | Blancpain GT Series Asia - GT3 | FFF Racing Team by ACM | 12 | 3 | 2 | 2 | 6 | 170 | **1st** |
| 2019 | Blancpain GT Series Endurance Cup | Orange1 FFF Racing Team | 4 | 0 | 0 | 0 | 2 | 49 | 5th |
| 2019 | British GT Championship - GT3 | WPI Motorsport | 5 | 0 | 0 | 0 | 1 | 70.5 | 9th |
| 2019 | 24H GT Series - A6 | Target Racing | | | | | | | |
| 2019 | 24H GT Series - A6 | Barwell Motorsport | | | | | | | |
| 2020 | British GT Championship - GT3 | WPI Motorsport | 2 | 0 | 0 | 0 | 0 | 2 | 18th |
| 2020 | 24H GT Series - GT3 | Barwell Motorsport | | | | | | | |
| 2021 | British GT Championship - GT3 | Barwell Motorsport | 9 | 1 | 2 | 7 | 5 | 172 | **1st** |
| 2021 | GT World Challenge America - Pro | TR3 Racing | 2 | 0 | 0 | 1 | 1 | 30 | 7th |
| 2021 | ADAC GT Masters | Team WRT | 2 | 0 | 0 | 0 | 0 | 13 | 36th |
| 2021 | GT World Challenge Europe Endurance Cup | Audi Sport Team WRT | 1 | 0 | 0 | 0 | 0 | 18 | 15th |
| 2021 | GT World Challenge Europe Endurance Cup | Saintéloc Racing | 1 | 0 | 0 | 0 | 0 | 18 | 15th |
| 2021 | Intercontinental GT Challenge | Audi Sport Team WRT | 1 | 0 | 0 | 0 | 0 | 15 | 13th |
| 2022 | GT World Challenge Europe Endurance Cup | JP Motorsport | 4 | 0 | 0 | 0 | 0 | 10 | 26th |
| 2022 | GT World Challenge Europe Sprint Cup | JP Motorsport | 6 | 0 | 0 | 0 | 0 | 9 | 14th |
| 2022 | ADAC GT Masters | JP Motorsport | 2 | 0 | 0 | 0 | 0 | 0 | NC† |
| 2023 | GT World Challenge Europe Endurance Cup | Barwell Motorsport | 5 | 0 | 0 | 0 | 0 | 0 | NC |
| 2023 | GT World Challenge Europe Endurance Cup - Pro-Am | Barwell Motorsport | 5 | 2 | 3 | 2 | 3 | 72 | **2nd** |
| 2023 | GT World Challenge Asia - GT3 | Climax Racing | 12 | 0 | 0 | 1 | 0 | 48 | 15th |
| 2023 | 24 Hours of Nürburgring - SP9 | Audi Sport Team Scherer PHX | 1 | 0 | 0 | 0 | 0 | N/A | DNF |
| 2024 | GT World Challenge Europe Endurance Cup | HAAS RT | 1 | 0 | 0 | 0 | 0 | 0 | NC |
| 2024 | GT World Challenge Europe Endurance Cup | Imperiale Racing | 1 | 0 | 0 | 0 | 0 | 0 | NC |
| 2024 | TCR Denmark Touring Car Series | TPR Racing | 3 | 0 | 1 | 0 | 1 | 55 | 14th |
| 2026 | GT World Challenge Europe Endurance Cup | Steller Motorsport | 5 | 0 | 0 | 0 | 0 | 0 | NC |
| 2026 | Lamborghini Super Trofeo North America - Pro | TR3 Racing | 8 | 2 | 4 | 3 | 6 | 79 | 5th |

=== Complete ADAC Formel Masters results ===
(key) (Races in bold indicate pole position) (Races in italics indicate fastest lap)

| Year | Team | 1 | 2 | 3 | 4 | 5 | 6 | 7 | 8 | 9 | 10 | 11 | 12 | 13 | 14 | 15 | 16 | 17 | 18 | 19 | 20 | 21 | 22 | 23 | 24 | Pos. | Points |
|---|---|---|---|---|---|---|---|---|---|---|---|---|---|---|---|---|---|---|---|---|---|---|---|---|---|---|---|
| 2011 | ma-con Motorsport | OSC; 1; 12 | OSC; 2; 22 | OSC; 3 DNS | SAC; 1; 4 | SAC; 2; 5 | SAC; 3; 2 | ZOL; 1; 3 | ZOL; 2; 20 | ZOL; 3 DNS | NÜR; 1; 4 | NÜR; 2; 6 | NÜR; 3; 6 | RBR; 1 | RBR; 2 | RBR; 3 | LAU; 1 | LAU; 2 | LAU; 3 | ASS; 1 | ASS; 2 | ASS; 3 | HOC; 1 | HOC; 2 | HOC; 3 | 10th | 83 |

=== Complete Formula Acceleration 1 results ===
(key) (Races in bold indicate pole position) (Races in italics indicate fastest lap)

| Year | Team | 1 | 2 | 3 | 4 | 5 | 6 | 7 | 8 | 9 | 10 | Pos. | Points |
|---|---|---|---|---|---|---|---|---|---|---|---|---|---|
| 2014 | Sweden \ Venezuela | ALG; 1 | ALG; 2 | NAV; 1; 4 | NAV; 2; 7 | NÜR; 1; 9 | NÜR; 2; 10 | MNZ; 1; 7 | MNZ; 2; 10 | ASS; 1 | ASS; 2 | 11th | 24 |

=== Complete European Le Mans Series results ===
(key) (Races in bold indicate pole position) (Races in italics indicate fastest lap)

| Year | Entrant | Class | Chassis | Engine | 1 | 2 | 3 | 4 | 5 | Pos. | Points |
|---|---|---|---|---|---|---|---|---|---|---|---|
| 2014 | AF Corse | GTC | Ferrari 458 Italia GT3 | Ferrari F136 4.5 L V8 | SIL; 10 | IMO | RBR | LEC | EST | 28th | 1 |

=== Complete GT World Challenge Europe results ===
==== GT World Challenge Europe Endurance Cup ====
(key) (Races in bold indicate pole position) (Races in italics indicate fastest lap)

| Year | Team | Car | Class | 1 | 2 | 3 | 4 | 5 | 6 | 7 | Pos. | Points |
|---|---|---|---|---|---|---|---|---|---|---|---|---|
| 2017 | Raton Racing | Lamborghini Huracán GT3 | Pro-Am | MNZ; 20 | SIL; 27 | LEC; 37 | SPA; 6H | SPA; 12H | SPA; 24H | CAT | 33rd | 12 |
| 2019 | Orange 1 FFF Racing Team | Lamborghini Huracán GT3 Evo | Pro | MNZ; 2 | SIL; 6 | LEC; 3 | SPA; 6H; 33 | SPA; 12H; 21 | SPA; 24H; 8 | CAT | 5th | 49 |
| 2021 | Audi Sport Team WRT | Audi R8 LMS Evo | Pro | MON | LEC | SPA; 6H; 7 | SPA; 12H; 7 | SPA; 24H; 4 | NÜR | | 15th | 18 |
| 2021 | Saintéloc Racing | Audi R8 LMS Evo II | INV | | | | | | | CAT; 9 | NC | 0 |
| 2022 | JP Motorsport | McLaren 720S GT3 | Pro | IMO; 5 | LEC; Ret | SPA; 6H | SPA; 12H | SPA; 24H | HOC; 39† | CAT; 38 | 26th | 10 |
| 2023 | Barwell Motorsport | Lamborghini Huracán GT3 Evo 2 | Pro-Am | MNZ; 30 | LEC; Ret | SPA; 6H; 64 | SPA; 12H; Ret | **SPA**; **24H**; Ret | **NÜR**; 32 | CAT; 37 | 2nd | 72 |
| 2024 | HAAS RT | Audi R8 LMS Evo II | Pro | LEC | SPA; 6H; 31 | SPA; 12H; 26 | SPA; 24H; Ret | NÜR | MNZ | | 15th | 18 |
| 2024 | Imperiale Racing | Lamborghini Huracán GT3 Evo 2 | Gold | | | | | | | JED; 33 | NC | 0 |
| 2026 | Steller Motorsport | Chevrolet Corvette Z06 GT3.R | Gold | LEC; 38 | MNZ; 26 | SPA; 6H; 58 | SPA; 12H; 45 | SPA; 24H; 41 | NÜR; 21 | ALG; 48 | 6th | 49 |

==== GT World Challenge Europe Sprint Cup ====
(key) (Races in bold indicate pole position) (Races in italics indicate fastest lap)

| Year | Team | Car | Class | 1 | 2 | 3 | 4 | 5 | 6 | 7 | 8 | 9 | 10 | Pos. | Points |
|---|---|---|---|---|---|---|---|---|---|---|---|---|---|---|---|
| 2022 | JP Motorsport | McLaren 720S GT3 | Pro | BRH; 1 | BRH; 2 | MAG; 1 | MAG; 2 | ZAN; 1 Ret | ZAN; 2; 5 | MIS; 1; 14 | MIS; 2; 12 | VAL; 1; 17 | VAL; 2; 7 | 14th | 9 |

=== Complete British GT Championship results ===
(key) (Races in bold indicate pole position) (Races in italics indicate fastest lap)

| Year | Team | Car | Class | 1 | 2 | 3 | 4 | 5 | 6 | 7 | 8 | 9 | Pos. | Points |
|---|---|---|---|---|---|---|---|---|---|---|---|---|---|---|
| 2019 | WPI Motorsport | Lamborghini Huracán GT3 | GT3 | OUL; 1 | OUL; 2 | SNE; 1 | SNE; 2 | SIL; 1; 3 | DON; 1; 4 | SPA; 1; 9 | BRH; 1; 5 | DON; 1; 6 | 9th | 70.5 |
| 2020 | WPI Motorsport | Lamborghini Huracán GT3 Evo | GT3 | OUL; 1; 11 | OUL; 2; 9 | DON; 1 | DON; 2 | BRH; 1 | DON; 1 | SNE; 1 | SNE; 2 | SIL; 1 | 18th | 2 |
| 2021 | Barwell Motorsport | Lamborghini Huracán GT3 Evo | GT3 | BRH; 1; 3 | SIL; 1; 3 | DON; 1; 5 | SPA; 1; 1 | SNE; 1; 3 | SNE; 2; 5 | OUL; 1; 2 | OUL; 2; 4 | DON; 2; 4 | 1st | 172 |

=== Complete ADAC GT Masters results ===
(key) (Races in bold indicate pole position) (Races in italics indicate fastest lap)

| Year | Team | Car | 1 | 2 | 3 | 4 | 5 | 6 | 7 | 8 | 9 | 10 | 11 | 12 | 13 | 14 | Pos. | Points |
|---|---|---|---|---|---|---|---|---|---|---|---|---|---|---|---|---|---|---|
| 2021 | Team WRT | Audi R8 LMS Evo | OSC; 1 | OSC; 2 | RBR; 1; 5 | RBR; 2; 15 | ZAN; 1 | ZAN; 2 | LAU; 1 | LAU; 2 | SAC; 1 | SAC; 2 | HOC; 1 | HOC; 2 | NÜR; 1 | NÜR; 2 | 36th | 13 |
| 2022 | JP Motorsport | McLaren 720S GT3 | OSC; 1 | OSC; 2 | RBR; 1; 11 | RBR; 2; 9 | ZAN; 1 | ZAN; 2 | NÜR; 1 | NÜR; 2 | LAU; 1 | LAU; 2 | SAC; 1 | SAC; 2 | HOC; 1 | HOC; 2 | NC‡ | 0‡ |

‡ As Lind was a guest driver, he was ineligible to score points.

Sporting positions
| Preceded by Kevin Magnussen | Danish Formula Ford Championship; Champion; 2009 | Succeeded by Jesper Klistrup Egebart |
| Preceded by Chrissy Palmer | Formula Ford Festival; Winner; 2010 | Succeeded by Scott Malvern |
